= Wildflowers: The New York Loft Jazz Sessions =

1977 series of five album by various artists

Live album by Various
- Released: 1977
- Recorded: May 14–23, 1976
- Studios: Studio Rivbea, SoHo, Manhattan, New York
- Genre: Free jazz
- Label: Douglas / Casablanca
- Producer: Michael Cuscuna

Wildflowers: The New York Loft Jazz Sessions is a series of five albums recorded May 14–23, 1976 at Studio Rivbea, a loft jazz space in New York City, run by Sam Rivers and his wife Bea. The albums include performances by groups led by musicians such as Hamiet Bluiett, Anthony Braxton, Marion Brown, Dave Burrell, Andrew Cyrille, Oliver Lake, Jimmy Lyons, Ken McIntyre, Kalaparusha Maurice McIntyre, Roscoe Mitchell, David Murray, Sunny Murray, Sam Rivers, Leo Smith, Henry Threadgill, and Randy Weston. The recordings were originally released in 1977 on the Douglas and Casablanca labels as five separate LPs, and were reissued in 1999 by Knit Classics as a 3-CD set.

== Critical reception ==
Professional ratings
Review scores
Source	Rating
Allmusic	5/5 stars

The albums have historical significance in that they document the New York loft jazz scene of the mid-1970s. Reviewer Scott Yanow stated: "This historic series is primarily for open-eared listeners who are interested in explorative music." He wrote that it "gives one a good idea as to the strength and diversity of the scene of the period" and "is recommended to listeners with open ears." Writing in the Village Voice, Michael Agovino called the recordings "as riveting a document of the time as any that exists."

Author Phil Freeman wrote: "this set... contains an overwhelming amount of truly beautiful jazz performances, by names recognizable to almost anyone with a serious interest in the music... This music is composed, thoughtful, and artistic in every sense. The cliche of avant-garde jazz, that it is mere inchoate bleating, is repeatedly disproved here... This is an astonishing document, sonically wide-open to anyone with an ear for music of the spirit. The performances are varied enough, and sequenced in such a manner, that the most palatable, groove-oriented works will draw the listener in that he or she may appreciate the more abstract, experimental works as well. This music's vitality is timeless; these recordings should be heard by anyone with anything more than a glancing interest in jazz." David Keenan described the series as "essential": "As an aural snapshot of a once in a lifetime moment in jazz, it's unbeatable".

In a 1976 article for the New York Times, Robert Palmer called the albums "the most remarkable documents to emerge from the lofts so far." In a later review for the same publication, Adam Shatz wrote: "There is, to be sure, some unruly, even ugly stuff, but for the most part these sessions undercut the idea that loft jazz exalted energy for its own sake. What's astonishing is the range of expressive styles, from the languid chamber jazz of the saxophonists Julius Hemphill and Oliver Lake to the percussive Africanisms of the pianist Randy Weston and the drummer Sunny Murray to the garrulous New Orleans-inspired blues of the baritone saxophonist Hamiet Bluiett. It was the credo of the musicians gathered at Sam and Bea Rivers's Bond Street greenhouse to let a thousand flowers bloom, and wildflowers they were."

A review on Jazz Music Archives states: "Wildflowers aren't just compilation - it's very precise historical document from short-lived loft jazz era, recorded at its best time in its best place. Each of five series' albums is unique and excellent on its own way... Everyone interested in first meeting with loft jazz must start here".

== Track listings ==
=== Original LP 1 (Casablanca/Douglas NBLP 7045) ===
Side one

1. "Jays" - 6:00 - Kalaparusha Maurice McIntyre, tenor saxophone with Chris White, bass, electric bass and Jumma Santos, drums
2. "New Times" - 7:25 - Ken McIntyre, alto saxophone with Richard Harper, piano, Andy Vega, congas, and Andrei Strobert, percussion
3. "Over The Rainbow" - 5:30 - Sunny Murray & The Untouchable Factor with Byard Lancaster, alto saxophone, David Murray, tenor saxophone, Khan Jamal, vibraphone, Fred Hopkins, bass, and Sunny Murray, drums

Side two

1. "Rainbows" - 10:00 - Sam Rivers, soprano saxophone with Jerome Hunter, bass, and Jerry Griffin, drums
2. "Uso Dance" - 7:45 - Air with Henry Threadgill, alto saxophone, Fred Hopkins, bass, and Steve McCall, drums, percussion

=== Original LP 2 (Casablanca/Douglas NBLP 7046) ===
Side one

1. "The Need To Smile" - 10:47 - Flight To Sanity with Art Bennett, soprano saxophone, Byard Lancaster, tenor saxophone, Olu Dara, trumpet, Sonelius Smith, piano, Benny Wilson, bass, Harold Smith, drums, and Don Moye, congas
2. "Naomi" - 6:00 - Ken McIntyre, flute with Richard Harper, piano, Andy Vega, congas, percussion, and Andrei Strobert, percussion

Side two

1. "73°-S Kelvin" - 6:30 - Anthony Braxton, alto saxophone, clarinet, contrabass saxophone with George Lewis, trombone, Michael Gregory Jackson, guitar, Fred Hopkins, bass, Barry Altschul, drums, and Phillip Wilson, percussion
2. "And Then They Danced" - 7:00 - Marion Brown, alto saxophone with Jack Greg, bass, and Jumma Santos, drums
3. "Locomotif N°6" - 6:00 - Leo Smith & The New Delta Ahkri with Leo Smith, trumpet, Oliver Lake, alto saxophone, Anthony Davis, piano, Wes Brown, bass, Paul Maddox, drums, and Stanley Crouch, drums

=== Original LP 3 (Casablanca/Douglas NBLP 7047) ===
Side one

1. "Portrait Of Frank Edward Weston" - 8:50 - Randy Weston, piano with Alex Blake, bass, and Azzedin Weston, congas
2. "Clarity" - 5:15 - Michael Gregory Jackson, acoustic guitar with Oliver Lake, soprano saxophone, flute, Fred Hopkins, bass, and Phillip Wilson, drums
3. "Black Robert" - 6:30 - Dave Burrell, piano with Stafford James, bass, and Harold White, drums

Side two

1. "Blue Phase" - 12:37 - Ahmed Abdullah, trumpet with Charles Brackeen, tenor saxophone, soprano saxophone, Mashujaa, guitar, Leroy Seals, electric bass, Rickie Evans, double bass, and Rashied Sinan, drums
2. "Short Short" - 7:30 - Andrew Cyrille & Maono with David Ware, tenor saxophone, Ted Daniel, trumpet, Lyle Atkinson, bass, and Andrew Cyrille, drums

=== Original LP 4 (Casablanca/Douglas NBLP 7048) ===
Side one

1. "Tranquil Beauty" - 6:30 - Hamiet Bluiett, baritone saxophone, clarinet with Olu Dara, trumpet, Billy Patterson, guitar, Butch Campbell, guitar, Juney Booth, bass, Charles "Bobo" Shaw, drums, and Don Moye, drums
2. "Pensive" - 10:00 - Julius Hemphill, alto saxophone with Bern Nix, guitar, Abdul Wadud, cello, Phillip Wilson, drums, and Don Moye, percussion

Side two

1. "Push Pull" - 5:20 - Jimmy Lyons, alto saxophone with Karen Borca, bassoon, Hayes Burnett, bass, and Henry Maxwell Letcher, drums
2. "Zaki" - 9:30 - Oliver Lake, alto saxophone with Michael Gregory Jackson, guitar, Fred Hopkins, bass, and Phillip Wilson, drums
3. "Shout Song" - 2:30 - David Murray, tenor saxophone with Olu Dara, trumpet, flugelhorn, Fred Hopkins, bass, and Stanley Crouch, drums

=== Original LP 5 (Casablanca/Douglas NBLP 7049) ===
Side one

1. "Somethings Cookin" - 17:00 - Sunny Murray & The Untouchable Factor with Byard Lancaster, alto saxophone, flute, David Murray, tenor saxophone, Khan Jamal, vibraphone, Fred Hopkins, bass, and Sunny Murray, drums

Side two

1. "Chant" - 25:22 - Roscoe Mitchell, alto saxophone with Don Moye, drums, and Jerome Cooper, percussion, drums, saw
