= Rag, Bush and All =

Studio album by Henry Threadgill
- Released: 1989
- Recorded: December 1988
- Genre: Jazz
- Length: 38:28
- Label: RCA Novus
- Producer: David Stone

Henry Threadgill chronology
Easily Slip Into Another World (1987)	Rag, Bush and All (1989)	Spirit of Nuff...Nuff (1990)

Rag, Bush and All is an album by Henry Threadgill released on the RCA Novus label in 1989. The album and features four of Threadgill's compositions performed by Threadgill's Sextett with Bill Lowe, Ted Daniel, Fred Hopkins, Diedre Murray, Newman Baker and Reggie Nicholson.

== Reception ==
The Allmusic review by Scott Yanow awarded the album 4½ stars, stating, "This CD from altoist Henry Threadgill is a perfect mixture of improvisation and composition, hanging onto devices of the past while creating new music... Highly recommended to open-eared listeners". The Penguin Guide to Jazz on CD, LP & Cassette gave it 3½ stars, calling it "one of the finest albums of the later 1980s."

Professional ratings
Review scores
Source	Rating
Allmusic	4.5/5 stars
The Penguin Guide to Jazz	3.5/4 stars

== Track listing ==
All compositions by Henry Threadgill

1. "Off the Rag" - 12:40
2. "The Devil is on the Loose and Dancin' with a Monkey" - 6:44
3. "Gift" - 5:44
4. "Sweet Holy Rag" - 13:20

Recorded at Clinton Recording Studios, New York City in December 1988

== Personnel ==
- Henry Threadgill - alto saxophone, bass flute
- Ted Daniel - trumpet, flugelhorn
- Bill Lowe - bass trombone
- Diedre Murray - cello
- Fred Hopkins - bass
- Reggie Nicholson - percussion
- Newman Baker - percussion
