= Fred Hopkins =

American jazz double bassist (1947-1999)

Fred Hopkins (October 11, 1947 – January 7, 1999) was an American double bassist who played a major role in the development of the avant-garde jazz movement. He was best known for his association with the trio Air with Henry Threadgill and Steve McCall, and for his numerous performances and extensive recordings with major jazz musicians such as Muhal Richard Abrams, Arthur Blythe, Oliver Lake, and David Murray. He was a member of the AACM, and a frequent participant in the loft jazz scene of the 1970s. He also co-led a number of albums with the composer and cellist Diedre Murray. Gary Giddins wrote that Hopkins' playing "fused audacious power with mercuric reflexes." Howard Reich, writing in the Chicago Tribune, stated that "many connoisseurs considered [Hopkins] the most accomplished jazz bassist of his generation" and praised him for "the extraordinarily fluid technique, sumptuous tone and innovative methods he brought to his instrument."

== Biography and career ==
Hopkins was born in Chicago, Illinois, United States, and grew up in a musical family, listening to a wide variety of music from an early age. He attended DuSable High School, where he studied music under "Captain" Walter Dyett, who became well known for mentoring and training musicians. He was originally inspired to learn the cello after seeing a performance by Pablo Casals on television, but was told by Dyett that because the school didn't have a cello, he would have to play bass. After graduating from high school, he worked at a grocery store, but was encouraged by Dyett and other friends to pursue music more seriously. He soon began playing with the Civic Orchestra of Chicago, where he was the first recipient of the Charles Clark Memorial Scholarship, and studying with Joseph Gustafeste, principal bassist for the Chicago Symphony Orchestra at the time, as well as picking up piano duo gigs.

In the mid-1960s, Hopkins attended a concert by AACM members at Hyde Park and was intrigued. He began playing with Kalaparusha Maurice McIntyre, with whom he would make his first recording in 1970 (Forces and Feelings), and started becoming more serious about improvisation, playing with Muhal Richard Abrams's Experimental Band and other related groups. Hopkins stated that a major inspiration at that time was hearing John Coltrane's Coltrane's Sound: "it really changed my whole outlook on music. I knew then that I could do anything I wanted to do... And from that point on, I just got more involved, and started meeting more people over the years."

In the early 1970s, he formed a trio called Reflection with saxophonist Henry Threadgill and drummer Steve McCall. In 1975, he, like many other Chicago free-jazz musicians, left and moved to New York, where he soon regrouped with Threadgill and McCall, who also moved there at around the same time. They renamed their trio Air, and went on to tour and record extensively. He also joined the AACM, immersed himself in New York's loft scene, and, over the following decades, increasingly gained recognition, gigging with Roy Haynes and performing and recording with artists such as Muhal Richard Abrams, Hamiet Bluiett, Anthony Braxton, Marion Brown, Arthur Blythe, Oliver Lake, David Murray, Diedre Murray, and Don Pullen, as well as with various groups led by Threadgill.

In 1997, he moved back to Chicago, stating that he "got tired of the stress" of living in New York, and reuniting with "ten brothers and sisters and 35 nieces and nephews". He continued to perform, tour, and record with a wide variety of musicians. He died in 1999 at age 51 of heart disease at the University of Chicago Hospital.

== Discography ==
=== As co-leader with Diedre Murray ===
- Firestorm (Les Disques Victo, 1992)
- Stringology (Black Saint, 1994)
- Prophecy (About Time, 1998)

With Air

- Air Song (Why Not, 1975)
- Live Air (Black Saint, 1976)
- Air Raid (Why Not, 1976)
- Air Time (Nessa, 1977)
- Open Air Suit (Arista Novus, 1978)
- Montreux Suisse (Arista Novus, 1978)
- Air Lore (Arista Novus, 1979)
- Air Mail (Black Saint, 1980)
- 80° Below '82 (Antilles, 1982)
- Live at Montreal International Jazz Festival (as New Air; Black Saint, 1983)
- Air Show No. 1 (as New Air with Cassandra Wilson; Black Saint, 1986)

=== As sideman ===
With Ahmed Abdullah

- Ahmed Abdullah and the Solomonic Quintet (Silkheart, 1988)

With Muhal Richard Abrams

- Colors in Thirty-Third (Soul Note, 1987)
- The Hearinga Suite (Soul Note, 1989)

With Hamiet Bluiett

- Resolution (Black Saint, 1977)
- Ebu (Soul Note, 1984)
- The Clarinet Family (Black Saint, 1987)
- ...If You Have to Ask... You Don't Need to Know (Tutu Records, 1991)
- Im/possible To Keep (India Navigation, 1996)

With Arthur Blythe

- In the Tradition (Columbia, 1979)
- Illusions (Columbia, 1980)
- Blythe Spirit (Columbia, 1981)

With Charles Brackeen

- Attainment (Silkheart, 1987)
- Worshippers Come Nigh (Silkheart, 1987)

With Peter Brötzmann and Rashied Ali

- Songlines (FMP, 1994)

With Peter Brötzmann and Hamid Drake

- The Atlanta Concert (Okka Disk, 2001)

With Marion Brown

- Awofofora (Discomate, 1976)

With John Carter

- Dance of the Love Ghosts (Gramavision, 1987)
- Fields (Gramavision, 1988)
- Shadows on a Wall (Gramavision, 1989)

With Andrew Cyrille

- Ode to the Living Tree (Venus, 1995)

With Marc Edwards

- Black Queen (Alpha Phonics, 1991)

With Kahil El'Zabar

- Love Outside of Dreams (Delmark, 2002)

With The Group (Ahmed Abdullah, Marion Brown, Billy Bang, Sirone, Hopkins, Andrew Cyrille)

- Live (NoBusiness Records, 2012)

With Craig Harris

- Black Bone (Soul Note, 1983)

With Tyrone Henderson

- Not So Unusual Blues (Konnex Records, 2000)

With Michael Gregory Jackson

- Gifts (Arista Novus, 1979)

With Frank Lacy

- Tonal Weights and Blue Fire (Tutu, 1990)

With Oliver Lake

- Holding Together (Black Saint, 1976)
- Expandable Language (Black Saint, 1984)
- Otherside (Gramavision, 1988)
- Gallery (Gramavision, 1989)

Performing music of Anne LeBaron

- The Musical Railism of Anne LeBaron (Mode, 1995)

With Michael Marcus

- Here At! (Soul Note, 1993)

With Kalaparusha Maurice McIntyre

- Forces and Feelings (Delmark, 1970)

With Marcello Melis

- Free to Dance (Black Saint, 1978)

With Jemeel Moondoc

- Judy's Bounce (Soul Note, 1982)

With Butch Morris

- Testament: A Conduction Collection - Conduction 38, In Freud's Garden / Conduction 39, Thread Waxing Space / Conduction 40, Thread Waxing Space (New World Records, 1995)

With David Murray

- Low Class Conspiracy (Adelphi, 1976)
- Flowers for Albert: The Complete Concert (India Navigation, 1976)
- Vol. 1:Penthouse Jazz (Circle, 1977)
- Vol. 2:Holy Siege On Intrigue (Circle, 1977)
- Live at the Lower Manhattan Ocean Club (India Navigation, 1978)
- Sweet Lovely (Black Saint, 1979)
- Live at Sweet Basil Volume 1 (Black Saint, 1985)
- Live at Sweet Basil Volume 2 (Black Saint, 1985)
- In Our Style (DIW, 1986)
- Recording N.Y.C. 1986 (DIW, 1986)
- The People's Choice (Cecma, 1987)
- Ballads (DIW, 1988)
- Deep River (DIW, 1988)
- Spirituals (DIW, 1988)
- Lovers (DIW, 1988)
- Tenors (DIW, 1988)
- Special Quartet (DIW/Columbia, 1990)
- David Murray Big Band (DIW/Columbia, 1991)
- David Murray/James Newton Quintet (DIW, 1991)
- Death of a Sideman (DIW, 1992)
- South of the Border (DIW, 1993)
- For Aunt Louise (DIW, 1993)
- Love and Sorrow (DIW, 1993)
- MX (Red Baron, 1993)
- Live '93 Acoustic Octfunk (Sound Hills Records, 1994)
- Dark Star: The Music of the Grateful Dead (Astor, 1996)

With Sunny Murray's Untouchable Factor

- Apple Cores (Philly Jazz, 1980)

With Bern Nix

- Alarms and Excursions (New World, 1993)

With Ivo Perelman

- Children Of Ibeji (Enja, 1992)

With Don Pullen

- Warriors (Black Saint, 1979)
- The Sixth Sense (Black Saint, 1985)

With Horace Tapscott

- Dissent or Descent (Nimbus West, 1984 [1998])

With Malachi Thompson

- Rising Daystar (Delmark, 1997 [1999])

With Henry Threadgill

- X-75 Volume 1 (Arista/Novus, 1979)
- When Was That? (About Time, 1981)
- Just the Facts and Pass the Bucket (About Time, 1983)
- Subject to Change (About Time, 1984)
- You Know the Number (RCA/Novus, 1986)
- Easily Slip Into Another World (RCA/Novus, 1987)
- Rag, Bush and All (RCA/Novus, 1988)

With Tom Varner

- Tom Varner Quartet (Soul Note, 1980)

With the World Bass Violin Ensemble

- Bassically Yours (Black Saint, 1984)

With the World Saxophone Quartet

- Breath of Life (Elektra/Nonesuch, 1992)

With Various artists

- Wildflowers 1: The New York Loft Jazz Sessions (performing with Sunny Murray and The Untouchable Factor and Air; Douglas, 1977)
- Wildflowers 2: The New York Loft Jazz Sessions (performing with Anthony Braxton; Douglas, 1977)
- Wildflowers 3: The New York Loft Jazz Sessions (performing with Michael Gregory Jackson; Douglas, 1977)
- Wildflowers 4: The New York Loft Jazz Sessions (performing with Oliver Lake and David Murray; Douglas, 1977)
- Wildflowers 5: The New York Loft Jazz Sessions (performing with Sunny Murray and The Untouchable Factor; Douglas, 1977)
- Wildflowers: The New York Loft Jazz Sessions - Complete (reissue of the 5 discs above on 3 CDs; Knit Classics, 1999)
- The Young Lions - A Concert Of New Music Played By Seventeen Exceptional Young Musicians - The Kool Jazz Festival June 30, 1982 (Elektra, 1983)
