= Recording N.Y.C. 1986 =

Studio album by David Murray
- Released: 1986
- Recorded: May 10, 1986; Sound Ideas, NYC
- Genre: Jazz
- Length: 52:20
- Label: DIW; DIW 802
- Producer: Kazunori Sugiyama

David Murray chronology
I Want to Talk About You (1986)	Recording N.Y.C. 1986 (1986)	In Our Style (1986)

Recording N.Y.C. 1986 is an album by David Murray (also known by the eponymous title David Murray) released on the Japanese DIW label in 1986. It features six quartet performances by Murray with Fred Hopkins, James Blood Ulmer and Sunny Murray.

== Reception ==
The Allmusic review awarded the album 3 stars.

Professional ratings
Review scores
Source	Rating
Allmusic	3/5 stars

== Track listing ==
All compositions by David Murray except as indicated

1. "Red Car" (Butch Morris) - 4:00
2. "Long Goodbye" (Morris) 4:35
3. "Kareem" - 8:30
4. "According To Webster" - 11:15
5. "Patricia" - 9:35
6. "Light Years" - 14:15

== Personnel ==
- David Murray - tenor saxophone
- James Blood Ulmer - guitar
- Fred Hopkins - bass
- Sunny Murray - drums
