= Live at Montreal International Jazz Festival =

Live album by New Air
- Released: 1984
- Recorded: July 1983
- Genre: Jazz
- Length: 46:32
- Label: Black Saint
- Producer: Giovanni Bonandrini

New Air chronology
80° Below '82 (1982)	Live at Montreal International Jazz Festival (1984)	Air Show No. 1 (1986)

Live at Montreal International Jazz Festival is a live album recorded for the Italian Black Saint label by the improvisational collective New Air, featuring Henry Threadgill, Fred Hopkins, and Pheeroan akLaff. They performed at the Montreal International Jazz Festival in 1983. The album was the first release to feature akLaff, who replaced original Air drummer Steve McCall.

== Reception ==
The AllMusic review by Ron Wynn stated, "Hopkins didn't mesh as smoothly with akLaff on this date, although they found a comfortable meeting place by mid-album. Henry Threadgill, as always, was a compelling soloist, especially on alto sax".

Professional ratings
Review scores
Source	Rating
AllMusic	2.5/5 stars
The Penguin Guide to Jazz	2/4 stars

== Track listing ==
All compositions by Henry Threadgill

1. "Sir Simpleton" - 11:02
2. "Difda Dance" - 12:53
3. "Roll On" - 4:56
4. "Tragedy on a Thursday Afternoon" - 8:32
5. "No. 1" - 9:09

- Recorded live July, 1983, at Montreal International Jazz Festival

== Personnel ==
- Henry Threadgill - alto saxophone, flute, baritone saxophone
- Fred Hopkins - bass
- Pheeroan akLaff - percussion
