= You Know the Number =

Studio album by Henry Threadgill
- Released: 1986
- Recorded: October 12 7 13, 1986
- Genre: Jazz
- Label: RCA Novus

Henry Threadgill chronology
Subject to Change (1985)	You Know the Number (1986)	Easily Slip Into Another World (1987)

You Know the Number is an album by Henry Threadgill released on the RCA Novus label in 1986. The album features six of Threadgill's compositions performed by Threadgill's Sextett with Frank Lacy, Rasul Siddik, Fred Hopkins, Diedre Murray, Pheeroan akLaff and Reggie Nicholson.

== Reception ==
The Allmusic review by Stephen Cook awarded the album 4½ stars, stating, "This title is a must for Threadgill fans and also worthwhile for those interested in the experimental side of jazz". The Penguin Guide to Jazz gave it three stars, calling it "slightly chaotic."

Professional ratings
Review scores
Source	Rating
Allmusic	4.5/5 stars
Philadelphia Inquirer	4/4 stars
The Penguin Guide to Jazz	3/4 stars

== Track listing ==
All compositions by Henry Threadgill

1. "Bermuda Blues" - 9:26
2. "Silver and Gold, Baby Silver and Gold" - 5:45
3. "Theme from Thomas Cole" - 6:39
4. "Good Times" - 6:33
5. "To Be Announced" - 6:27
6. "Paille Street" - 4:26 Bonus track on CD
7. "Those Who Eat Cookies" - 6:16

Recorded at Uptown Chelsea Sound, New York City on October 12 & 13, 1986

== Personnel ==
- Henry Threadgill - alto saxophone, tenor saxophone, bass flute
- Rasul Siddik - trumpet
- Frank Lacy - trombone
- Diedre Murray - cello
- Fred Hopkins - bass
- Reggie Nicholson - percussion
- Pheeroan akLaff - percussion
- Ed Michel - producer
