= X-75 Volume 1 =

Studio album by Henry Threadgill
- Released: 1979
- Recorded: January 13, 1979
- Genre: Jazz
- Label: Arista/Novus

Henry Threadgill chronology
| X-75 Volume 1 (1979) | When Was That? (1981) |

Professional ratings
Review scores
| Source | Rating |
|---|---|
| AllMusic | 4/5 stars |
| DownBeat | 4/5 stars |
| Tom Hull | C+ |

X-75 Volume 1 is the debut album by American musician Henry Threadgill released on the Arista Novus label in 1979. The album and features four of Threadgill's compositions performed by an unusual nine-piece ensemble of Threadgill himself and three other saxophonists/flutists, four bassists, and a vocalist.

== Reception ==
The Allmusic review by Brian Olewnick states, "Henry Threadgill's first album as a leader immediately plunged into experimental waters. He utilized a nonet the likes of which had certainly never been heard before and probably not since... Threadgill's massive talent for mid-size band arrangements is immediately apparent... As of 2002, X-75, Vol. 1 was unreleased on disc and, even more disappointingly, there was never a "Vol. 2." But Threadgill fans looking for a link between Air and his Sextett owe it to themselves to search this one out".

In his 4 star review for DownBeat, Neil Tesser wrote, "The four pieces on X-75 show an impressive variety, yet Threadgill’s melodies have a shamanistic air, a residue of folk magic, that helps tie them together".

== Track listing ==
All compositions by Henry Threadgill

1. "Sir Simpleton" – 6:26
2. "Celebration" – 13:2
3. "Air Song" – 10:21
4. "Fe Fi Fo Fum" – 13:00

Recorded at CI Recording Studios, New York City on January 13, 1979

== Personnel ==
- Henry Threadgill – alto saxophone, flute, bass flute
- Douglas Ewart – bass clarinet, piccolo, flute
- Joseph Jarman – soprano saxophone, flute
- Wallace McMillan – piccolo, alto flute, tenor saxophone
- Leonard Jones – bass
- Brian Smith – piccolo bass, bass
- Rufus Reid – bass
- Fred Hopkins – bass
- Amina Claudine Myers – vocals
