= Spiral Live at Montreux 1978 =

Live album by Muhal Richard Abrams
- Released: 1978
- Recorded: July 22, 1978
- Genre: Jazz
- Length: 42:28
- Label: Arista/Novus

Muhal Richard Abrams chronology
Lifea Blinec (1978)	Spiral Live at Montreux 1978 (1978)	Spihumonesty (1979)

Professional ratings
Review scores
Source	Rating
AllMusic	4/5 stars
DownBeat	5/5 stars

Spiral Live at Montreux 1978 is a live album by Muhal Richard Abrams recorded at the Montreux Jazz Festival and released on the Arista Novus label in 1978.

== Reception ==
The AllMusic review by Scott Yanow states "Abrams' occasional use of devices from earlier styles (including a bit of dissonant stride and basslines à la Lennie Tristano) makes this music a bit more accessible than one might expect at times, but in general, this set is for listeners who enjoy hearing new approaches to musical freedom".

DownBeat gave the album 5 stars. Reviewer Bradley Parker-Sparrow wrote, "Ruthless clarity and a quality of raw unrestrained energy make this solo record a masterpiece."

== Track listing ==
All compositions by Muhal Richard Abrams

1. "B Song" - 13:50
2. "String Song" - 5:05
3. "Voice Song" - 23:33
- Recorded at the Montreux Jazz Festival, Switzerland on July 22, 1978

== Personnel ==
- Muhal Richard Abrams – piano
