= 80° Below '82 =

Studio album by Air
- Released: 1982
- Recorded: January 23–24, 1982
- Studio: Right Track Recording Studio, New York City
- Genre: Jazz
- Length: 35:18
- Label: Antilles
- Producer: Air Productions

Air chronology
Air Mail (1980)	80° Below '82 (1982)	Live at Montreal International Jazz Festival (1983)

80° Below '82 is an album by the improvisational collective Air featuring Henry Threadgill, Steve McCall and Fred Hopkins, recorded in 1982 for the Antilles label.

== Reception ==
The AllMusic review by Scott Yanow stated: "This blues-oriented set is more accessible than many of Air's previous recordings without watering down the explorative nature of this always-interesting group". The Rolling Stone Jazz Record Guide said it "captures the telepathic agreement of Air's members in full glory".

Professional ratings
Review scores
Source	Rating
AllMusic	3/5 stars
The Rolling Stone Jazz Record Guide	4/5 stars

== Track listing ==
All compositions by Henry Threadgill except where noted.

1. "Chicago Breakdown" (Jelly Roll Morton) – 7:58
2. "The Traveller" – 9:28
3. "80° Below '82" – 8:02
4. "Do Tell" – 9:50

== Personnel ==
- Henry Threadgill – alto saxophone
- Fred Hopkins – bass
- Steve McCall – trap drums
