= Steve McCall (drummer) =

American jazz drummer (1933–1989)

- Born: September 30, 1933; Chicago, Illinois, United States
- Died: May 24, 1989 (aged 55)
- Genres: Jazz
- Occupation: Drummer
- Formerly of: Air, Fred Anderson, Creative Construction Company

Steve McCall (September 30, 1933 – May 24, 1989) was an American jazz drummer.

== Biography ==
McCall was born in Chicago, Illinois, United States. As a young child, he "experienced a musical epiphany" when he was given an opportunity to play a drum in Chicago's annual Bud Billiken Parade. As a teenager, he attended Englewood High School in Chicago and studied music theory, Latin percussion, and classical percussion. After high school, he left to join the U. S. Air Force, then, in 1954, returned to Chicago, where he took a job in the airline industry. He soon bought his first drum set and began using free air travel passes to study with drummer Charles "Specs" Wright in Philadelphia. He also began freelancing, playing with Lucky Carmichael, Booker Ervin, Charles Stepney, Gene Shaw, and Ramsey Lewis.

In 1961, McCall befriended pianist Muhal Richard Abrams, and began playing with Abrams' Experimental Band, which brought him into contact with like-minded Chicago-based musicians. Over the coming years the two also played in a trio format with multi-instrumentalist Donald Rafael Garrett, and well as in a quintet which included Garrett plus saxophonists Gene Dinwiddie and Roscoe Mitchell. McCall went on to become one of the founders of the AACM, established in 1965, initially serving as treasurer. During the mid-1960s, he continued to freelance with musicians and groups in a wide range of styles, from blues to bop to free jazz. In 1966, he participated in the recording of Joseph Jarman's debut album Song For.

In 1967, McCall moved to Amsterdam, the first AACM member to visit Europe, and was soon playing with expatriates such as Don Byas and Dexter Gordon. In 1968, he began playing in a group led by Marion Brown, featuring Gunter Hampel, Ambrose Jackson, and Barre Phillips. McCall would go on to record five albums with Brown. That year, McCall moved to Paris and joined an existing group whose members were Anthony Braxton, Leo Smith, and Leroy Jenkins. (The Braxton/Smith/Jenkins trio had recently completed work on the album 3 Compositions of New Jazz). Together, the four recorded the albums Anthony Braxton and This Time... for BYG Actuel. During his stay in Paris, McCall served as a link between the first generation of European free jazz musicians and members of the AACM, playing and recording with Willem Breuker, the Instant Composers Pool, John Surman, Tony Oxley, and Gunter Hampel. Notable albums recorded during this time included Hampel's The 8th Of July 1969, which also featured Braxton and Jeanne Lee, as well as Gittin' to Know Y'All, recorded during the 1969 Baden-Baden Free Jazz Meeting.

In 1970, McCall returned to Chicago. In May of that year, he reunited with Braxton, Smith and Jenkins, forming a group which also included Muhal Richard Abrams and Richard Davis, and which became known as the Creative Construction Company. The group performed a concert at the Peace Church in New York City, a recording of which was released in two volumes. That summer, McCall also recorded the album The Chase! with Dexter Gordon and Gene Ammons. The following year, he played with Henry Threadgill and Fred Hopkins in a short-lived trio called Reflection. The group would later reunite under the name Air. In 1972, McCall played with both the Fred Anderson quartet and the Muhal Richard Abrams Sextet.

In 1974, McCall moved back to Europe. He then returned to the United States in 1975, moving to New York City and reuniting with Threadgill and Hopkins. The trio, now called Air, would go on to record eleven albums, with McCall participating in all but the last two. During the mid to late 1970s, McCall also performed and recorded with Abrams, Billy Bang, Arthur Blythe, Ted Curson, Chico Freeman, Cecil McBee, and Butch Morris. During the early 1980s, he recorded a number of albums with David Murray, and in the mid-1980s, he joined Cecil Taylor's group, recording Olu Iwa, and worked with Roscoe Mitchell again, recording The Flow of Things.

McCall passed away in 1989 at South Shore Hospital in Chicago. Despite his lengthy career, he never recorded a session as a leader. However, McCall received equal billing with tenor sax player Fred Anderson on the posthumously released Vintage Duets album, recorded in 1980 and issued in 1994.

== Legacy and tributes ==
Writer Gary Giddins called McCall "an immensely likable man whose work with Air was a benchmark of the '70s", and praised his drumming as "ingeniously volatile". The authors of The Penguin Guide to Jazz noted McCall's "ability to combine forward drive with outbreaks of complete rhythmic anarchy". John Litweiler wrote that McCall's "sensitivity to subtle gradations of sound textures... put him in wide demand as an accompanist; uniquely in jazz, he was a drummer who conveyed emotional subtlety."

Henry Threadgill recalled: "Steve plays so unorthodox, the way he used to handle space, he would free me so I'd have a number of levels to play on." Sunny Murray called McCall "the best surprise with the left hand I ever heard".

David Murray recorded a tribute composed by Butch Morris entitled "Calling Steve McCall" on his 1991 album David Murray Big Band. In 1992, Roscoe Mitchell recorded an album titled This Dance Is for Steve McCall as a tribute. In 2015, the Artifacts Trio (Nicole Mitchell, Tomeka Reid, and Mike Reed) included two of McCall's compositions on their album Artifacts as part of a celebration of the AACM's legacy.

== Discography ==
With Air

- 1975: Air Song
- 1976: Live Air
- 1976: Air Raid
- 1977: Air Time
- 1977: Wildflowers: The New York Loft Jazz Sessions (one track)
- 1978: Open Air Suit
- 1978: Montreux Suisse
- 1979: Air Lore
- 1980: Air Mail
- 1982: 80° Below '82

With Fred Anderson

- 1980: Vintage Duets: Chicago, January 11, 1980 (Okka Disk)

With Creative Construction Company

- Creative Construction Company (Muse, 1970 [1975])
- Creative Construction Company Vol. II (Muse, 1970 [1976])

=== As sideman ===
With Muhal Richard Abrams

- Things to Come from Those Now Gone (Delmark, 1975)
- 1-OQA+19 (Black Saint, 1979)

With Billy Bang

- Sweet Space (Anima, 1979)

With Amiri Baraka

- New Music - New Poetry (India Navigation, 1982) with David Murray

With Arthur Blythe

- In the Tradition (Columbia, 1979)
- Illusions (Columbia, 1980)
- Blythe Spirit (Columbia, 1981)

With Lester Bowie

- Gittin' to Know Y'All (MPS, 1970) with the Baden-Baden Free Jazz Orchestra

With Anthony Braxton

- Anthony Braxton (BYG Actuel, 1969)
- This Time... (BYG Actuel, 1970)

With Marion Brown

- Gesprächsfetzen (Calig, 1968) with Gunter Hampel
- Le Temps Fou (Polydor, 1968)
- Marion Brown in Sommerhausen (Calig, 1969)
- Geechee Recollections (Impulse!, 1973)
- Sweet Earth Flying (Impulse!, 1974)

With Ted Curson

- Blue Piccolo (Whynot, 1976)
- Jubilant Power (Inner City, 1976)
- Snake Johnson (Chiaroscuro, 1981)

With Chico Freeman

- Morning Prayer (Whynot, 1976)
- Chico (India Navigation, 1977)

With Claudina y Alberto Gambino

- Canción del amor armado (Explosión, 1975)

With Dexter Gordon and Gene Ammons

- The Chase! (Prestige, 1970)

With Gunter Hampel

- The 8th Of July 1969 (Birth, 1969)
- Cosmic Dancer (Birth, 1975)
- Jubilation (Birth, 1985)

With Instant Composers Pool

- Instant Composers Pool (ICP, 1971)

With Joseph Jarman

- Song For (Delmark, 1967)

With Siegfried Kessler and Barre Phillips

- Live at the Gill's Club 1970 (Futura, 1970)

With Byard Lancaster

- Us (Palm, 1974)

With Jeanne Lee

- Conspiracy (Earthforms, 1974)

With Ramsey Lewis

- More Sounds of Christmas (Argo, 1964)

With Cecil McBee

- Music from the Source (Enja, 1977)
- Compassion (Enja, 1977)

With E. Parker McDougal and Chicago Hard-Core Jazz

- Initial Visit (Grits, 1975)

With Roscoe Mitchell

- The Flow of Things (Black Saint, 1986)

With Butch Morris

- In Touch... But Out Of Reach (Kharma, 1978)

With David Murray

- Sweet Lovely (Black Saint, 1980)
- Ming (Black Saint, 1980)
- Home (Black Saint, 1981)
- Murray's Steps (Black Saint, 1982)

With Cecil Taylor

- Olu Iwa (Black Saint, 1986)
