= Sweet Lovely =

Studio album by David Murray
- Released: 1980
- Recorded: December 4–5, 1979
- Genre: Jazz
- Length: 38:25
- Label: Black Saint

David Murray chronology
3D Family (1980)	Sweet Lovely (1980)	Solo Live (1980)

Sweet Lovely is an album by David Murray, released on the Italian Black Saint label in 1980. It features performances by Murray, Fred Hopkins and Steve McCall.

== Reception ==
The AllMusic review by Scott Yanow states, "Murray stretches out on four of his originals (which clock in between eight and twelve-and-a-half minutes) and shows plenty of fire but also a healthy dose of lyricism. This is exciting music very much in the avant-garde".

Professional ratings
Review scores
Source	Rating
AllMusic	4/5 stars
The Penguin Guide to Jazz Recordings	4/4 stars
The Rolling Stone Jazz Record Guide	3/5 stars

== Track listing ==
1. "Coney Island" – 9:27
2. "Corazón" – 8:29
3. "The Hill" – 12:29
4. "Hope Scope" – 8:00

All compositions by David Murray
- Recorded at Barigozzi Studios, Milano, December 4 & 5, 1979

== Personnel ==
- David Murray: tenor saxophone
- Fred Hopkins: bass
- Steve McCall: drums
