= Solo Live (David Murray album) =

Live album by David Murray
- Released: 1980
- Recorded: May 30, 1980
- Genre: Jazz
- Length: 66:48
- Label: Cecma
- Producer: Francesco Maino

David Murray chronology
Sweet Lovely (1980)	Solo Live (1980)	Ming (1980)

Solo Live is an album of unaccompanied saxophone and clarinet solos by David Murray, recorded live on May 30, 1980, in Nyon, Switzerland. Originally released on the Cecma label as two separate LPs it was re-released as a single CD in 1997.

== Reception ==
The AllMusic review by Scott Yanow stated, "Murray, who doubles here on bass clarinet, tears into five of his originals (best known are 'Sweet Lovely' and 'Flowers for Albert'). The improvising is quite free, exploratory, and sometimes violent, although there are a few strong melodies".

Professional ratings
Review scores
Source	Rating
AllMusic	3/5 stars
The Penguin Guide to Jazz Recordings	3/4 stars

== Track listing ==
1. "B.C." – 9:05
2. "Both Feet on the Ground" – 6:27
3. "Rag Tag" – 7:18
4. "Solo #2" – 6:30
5. "Untitled" – 5:05
6. "Body and Soul" (Eyton, Green, Heyman, Sour) – 8:07
7. "Flowers for Albert" – 5:00
8. "Solo #1" – 7:04
9. "Sweet Lovely" – 7:13
10. "We See" (Monk) – 4:59

All compositions by David Murray except as indicated
- Recorded live on May 30, 1980, in Nyon, Switzerland.

== Personnel ==
- David Murray – tenor saxophone, bass clarinet
