= Montreux Suisse =

Live album by Air
- Released: 1978
- Recorded: July 22, 1978
- Genre: Jazz
- Length: 39:09
- Label: Arista Novus
- Producer: Michael Cuscuna

Air chronology
Open Air Suit (1978)	Montreux Suisse (1978)	Air Lore (1979)

Montreux Suisse is a live album by the improvisational collective Air featuring Henry Threadgill, Steve McCall and Fred Hopkins. It was recorded at the 1978 Montreux Jazz Festival in Switzerland. It has never been reissued on Compact Disc by itself, but it was included in the 8CD Complete Novus and Columbia Recordings of Henry Threadgill and Air set on Mosaic Records.

== Reception ==
The Allmusic review by Scott Yanow awarded the album 3 stars, stating, "Air's music frequently takes several listens to appreciate, and that is true of this passionate yet thoughtful outing".

DownBeat gave the album 5 stars. Reviewer Larry Birnbaum wrote, "Montreux Suisse is fresh Air indeed, from three of the most significant innovators of the day".

Professional ratings
Review scores
Source	Rating
Allmusic	3/5 stars
DownBeat	5/5 stars

== Track listing ==
All compositions by Henry Threadgill except as indicated

1. "Let's All Go Down to the Footwash" - 11:12
2. "Abra" - 12:50
3. "Suisse Air" (Henry Threadgill, Fred Hopkins, Steve McCall) - 15:07

- Recorded at the Montreux Jazz Festival on July 22, 1978

== Personnel ==
- Henry Threadgill - alto saxophone, tenor saxophone, baritone saxophone, hubkaphone
- Fred Hopkins - bass
- Steve McCall - drums, percussion
