= Murray's Steps =

Studio album by David Murray Octet
- Released: 1982
- Recorded: July 14, 15 & 19 1982
- Genre: Jazz
- Length: 39:45
- Label: Black Saint
- Producer: Giancarlo Barigozzi

David Murray Octet chronology
Home (1982)	Murray's Steps (1982)	Morning Song (1982)

Murray's Steps is an album by David Murray, released on the Italian Black Saint label in 1982. It feature his Octet consisting of Murray, Henry Threadgill, Bobby Bradford, Lawrence "Butch" Morris, Craig Harris, Curtis Clark, Wilber Morris and Steve McCall.

== Reception ==
The AllMusic review by Scott Yanow stated: "The octet is perfect for David Murray as an outlet for his writing, a showcase for his compositions, and an inspiring vehicle for his tenor and bass clarinet solos. For the third octet album (all are highly recommended), Murray meets up with quite a talented group of individuals: altoist Henry Threadgill, trumpeter Bobby Bradford, cornetist Butch Morris, trombonist Craig Harris, pianist Curtis Clark, bassist Wilber Morris, and drummer Steve McCall. Their interpretations of four of Murray's originals – 'Murray's Steps', 'Sweet Lovely', 'Sing Song', and 'Flowers for Albert'—are emotional, adventurous, and exquisite (sometimes all three at the same time)."

Professional ratings
Review scores
Source	Rating
AllMusic	5/5 stars
The Penguin Guide to Jazz Recordings	3/4 stars
The Rolling Stone Jazz Record Guide	4/5 stars

== Track listing ==
1. "Murray's Steps" – 12:25
2. "Sweet Lovely" – 8:00
3. "Sing Song" – 9:40
4. "Flowers for Albert" – 9:40

All compositions by David Murray
- Recorded at Barigozzi Studios, Milano, July 14, 15 & 19,1982

== Personnel ==
- David Murray – tenor saxophone, bass clarinet
- Henry Threadgill – alto saxophone
- Bobby Bradford – trumpet
- Lawrence "Butch" Morris – cornet
- Craig Harris – trombone
- Curtis Clark – piano
- Wilber Morris – bass
- Steve McCall – drums
