= Air Song =

Studio album by Air
- Released: 1975
- Recorded: September 10, 1975
- Genre: Jazz
- Length: 48:57
- Label: Why Not
- Producer: Bob Cummins

Air chronology
Air Song (1975)	Air Raid (1976)

Air Song is the debut album by the improvisational collective Air featuring Henry Threadgill, Steve McCall, and Fred Hopkins performing four of Threadgill's compositions. The album was originally released on the Japanese Why Not label in 1975 and later released in the U.S. on India Navigation in 1982.

== Reception ==
The Penguin Guide to Jazz selected this album as part of its suggested Core Collection, stating: "Air Song was the first release and still stands up well, four longish compositions by Threadgill whose quirky deployment of minimal themes and areas of activity gave the trio plenty to work with".

The AllMusic review by Thom Jurek commented: "The interplay between the three members is almost always inventive, engaging, and full of warmth and humor. There is little excessive indulgence to be found on these improvisations, and the degree of musicianship with these men is off the chart... A lovely and auspicious debut".

Professional ratings
Review scores
Source	Rating
AllMusic	4/5 stars
The Penguin Guide to Jazz	3/4 stars
The Rolling Stone Jazz Record Guide	4/5 stars

== Track listing ==
All compositions by Henry Threadgill

1. "Untitled Tango" – 12:08
2. "Great Body of the Riddle or Where Were the Dodge Boys When My Clay Started to Slide" – 13:29
3. "Dance of the Beast" – 11:03
4. "Air Song" – 12:17
  - Recorded at P.S. Recording Studios, Chicago, on September 10, 1975

== Personnel ==
- Henry Threadgill – tenor saxophone (track 1), baritone saxophone (track 2), alto saxophone (track 3), flute (track 4)
- Fred Hopkins – bass
- Steve McCall – drums
