= Opafire =

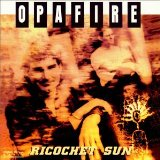
- Photo by Shaun Caster

Background information
- Origin: San Francisco, California
- Genres: Jazz fusion, smooth jazz, world fusion
- Years active: 1990–1998
- Labels: RCA/Novus, Higher Octave/EMI
- Past members: Zachary Norman E.; Robert Powell; Dallas Smith; Bryan Mantia; Michael Pluznick; Tom Corwin; Christopher Hedge; Joe Prisco; David Bomberg

Opafire was a jazz fusion group from San Francisco, California. Their debut album Opafire (RCA, 1991) sold close to half a million units worldwide.

Opafire was created in 1990 by composer, multi-instrumentalist, and record producer Zachary Norman E. In 1990, Opafire signed a contract with RCA Records after Steve Feinstein, a program director in San Francisco began playing the group's music. When RCA/BMG released the debut album Opafire, it gained international success and heavy rotation radio airplay. The Opafire songs, "Wajumbe", "Kalimbahari", and "Walk Like Rain" reached the No. 2, No. 11, and No. 26 spots on the Gavin Report "New Adult Contemporary Most Radio Plays" chart and Top Ten spots in R&R magazine, as well as reaching charts in Germany, Italy, Japan, France, Canada, the United Kingdom, Sweden, Denmark, Finland, the Netherlands, and Taiwan.

In 1991 Opafire toured with Miles Davis, Spyro Gyra, and the Yellow Jackets as part of the JVC Jazz Festival Tour, performing in venues with audiences of up to 12,000 people.

Opafire headlined many music festivals, theaters, and clubs, such as the Oxfam International Festival Tour, the Whole Life Expo Tour, the Stern Grove Festival, the Great American Music Hall and Yoshi's Night Club in San Francisco and Oakland California, The Baked Potato in Los Angeles, as well as large "Listener Appreciation Concert" performances for various radio stations.

In 1998, the musical group Opafire was put on sabbatical by Zachary Norman E. While healing from a hang gliding accident, he cited his apathy for Clear Channel Communications newer nationally syndicated smooth jazz radio format and his desire to compose music for film and television in his recording studio in Hawaii on the island of Maui.

== Members ==
- Zachary Norman E. - guitar, synthesizers, percussion, composer, producer, engineer
- Robert Powell - guitar, various stringed instruments
- Dallas Smith - sax, wind synthesizer, bamboo flutes
- Bryan Mantia - drums
- Michael Pluznick - percussion
- Tom Corwin - fretted bass
- Michael Manring - fretless bass, (studio sessions only)
- Christopher Hedge - production, engineer, (studio sessions only)
- Lygia Ferra - vocals - (stage)

== Discography ==
- 1991 - Opafire (RCA/BMG)
- 1991 - KKSF 103.7FM Sampler Volume 2 (JVC)
- 1991 - RCA Novus Sampler '90 (RCA/BMG)
- 1993 - Without a Trace (RCA/BMG)
- 1994 - Ricochet Sun (Higher Octave/EMI)
- 1996 - Panorama: A Collection of Music from Around the World (Higher Octave/EMI)
