= Songlines (Peter Brötzmann, Fred Hopkins, and Rashied Ali album) =

Studio album by Peter Brötzmann, Fred Hopkins, and Rashied Ali
- Released: 1994
- Recorded: October 30 and 31, 1991
- Studio: Berlin
- Genre: Free jazz
- Length: 1:10:49
- Label: FMP; CD 53
- Producer: Jost Gebers

Peter Brötzmann chronology
No Nothing (1991)	Songlines (1994)	The Chicago Octet/Tentet (1998)

Songlines (subtitled "Music is a memory bank for finding one's way about the world") is an album by saxophonist Peter Brötzmann, bassist Fred Hopkins, and drummer Rashied Ali. It was recorded on October 30 and 31, 1991, in Berlin, and was released in 1994 by FMP.

In his liner notes, Steve Lake wrote: "Peter has been muttering for years about his image as The Loudest, The Heaviest Free Jazz Player Of Them All hanging over him like a curse - without, it must be said, doing much to rectify the picture. Fred Hopkins and Rashied Ali, employing subtle persuasion of their own, guide him to other areas. Though this set will probably be assessed as a saxophone trio album, it really is the bassist and the drummer who establish the direction, and Brötzmann follows as best he can."

== Reception ==
Professional ratings
Review scores
Source	Rating
AllMusic	4.5/5 stars
The Penguin Guide to Jazz	4/4 stars
The Free Jazz Collective	4.5/5 stars

In a review for AllMusic, Thom Jurek called the album "the most understated performance of [Brötzmann's] entire career," and wrote: "Brötzmann appears to have been in awe on this date so great is his restraint. There are literally no passages in the entire concert where he attempts to push his way through the rhythm section to get to the other side... it comes off as a very intense, extremely quiet kind of blowing gig, where this trio were looking to discover things about each other and the music they were making... a landmark in Brötzmann's career."

The authors of The Penguin Guide to Jazz Recordings described the album as "a 'traditional' free trio, the American team playing with flair and swing, which Brötzmann uses for shape and context with his own severe lyricism."

Mark Corroto of All About Jazz commented: "Songlines is a fantastic introduction to those new to the music of Peter Brotzmann. It is the free jazz equivalent of Coltrane's Ballads... recording. It acts as an easing into the heavy ideology the German created in the late 1960s."

The Free Jazz Collective's Colin Green remarked: "One senses both Brötzmann and Ali reining themselves in to acclimatise Hopkins, who's very much centre-stage, physically and musically... Hopkins' deeply melodic style would be out of place with his partners' more Sturm und Drang and 'multidirectional' excursions."

Author Todd S. Jenkins called the album "fabulous," and wrote: "American free jazz has so often been about group democracy, while European improvisers have been more inclined toward shows of individual strength, leading to battles royal. On both sides, of course, exceptions abound. At any rate, the democratization of roles on Songlines results in an exciting set that does not completely drain the listener of energy."

Writer Mike Heffley stated: "Ali's pitched drums recall both Günter Sommer and Art Blakey; Hopkins's deeply pulse-rooted bass work, and traditional root-toning, timekeeping role partners up with those drums to give Brötzmann the kind of ground Ornette Coleman and Coltrane preferred to play against."

== Track listing ==
1. "No Messages" – 12:38
2. "Old Man Kangaroo" – 10:22
3. "Man in a Vacuum" – 9:19
4. "...It Is Solved by Walking" – 8:29
5. "Songlines" – 25:17
6. "Two Birds in a Feather" – 4:44

== Personnel ==
- Peter Brötzmann – tenor saxophone, alto saxophone, tárogató
- Fred Hopkins – bass
- Rashied Ali – drums
