= Anthony Braxton (album) =

Studio album by Anthony Braxton
- Released: 1969
- Recorded: September 10, 1969
- Studio: Saravah, Paris, France
- Genre: Jazz
- Length: 43:31
- Label: BYG Actuel

Anthony Braxton chronology
Silence (1969)	Anthony Braxton (1969)	This Time... (1970)

Anthony Braxton (also referred to as B-Xo/N-0-1-47a or Composition 6g) is an album by Anthony Braxton, released in 1969 on the BYG Actuel label. It features performances by Braxton, violinist Leroy Jenkins, trumpeter Leo Smith and percussionist Steve McCall.

== Reception ==
Professional ratings
Review scores
Source	Rating
AllMusic	3/5 stars
The Penguin Guide to Jazz Recordings	3/4 stars

The AllMusic review by Scott Yanow states: "The music performed... is very freely improvised, includes 'little instruments' for their variety in sound, and contrasts high-energy playing with space... and is far from accessible but is generally worth the struggle".

== Track listing ==
All compositions by Anthony Braxton except where noted.

1. "The Light on the Dalta" (Leo Smith) - 10:02
2. "Simple Like" (Leroy Jenkins) - 9:23
3. "B-Xo/N-O-1-47a" - 19:36*

*This track is graphically titled. This is an attempt to translate the title to text.

- Recorded at Saravah Studios, Paris, France, on September 10, 1969

== Personnel ==
- Anthony Braxton - alto saxophone, soprano saxophone, clarinet, contrabass clarinet, flute, chimes, sound machine
- Leroy Jenkins - violin, viola, flute, mouth organ, Hohner organ, harmonica
- Leo Smith - trumpet, flugelhorn, horns, log drum, siren
- Steve McCall - drums, darbouka, percussion
