= Spihumonesty =

Studio album by Muhal Richard Abrams
- Released: 1979
- Recorded: February 1978
- Genre: Jazz
- Length: 29:32
- Label: Black Saint

Muhal Richard Abrams chronology
Spiral Live at Montreux 1978 (1978)	Spihumonesty (1979)	Mama and Daddy (1980)

Spihumonesty is an album by Muhal Richard Abrams, released on the Italian Black Saint label in 1979. It features performances by Abrams, George Lewis, Roscoe Mitchell, Amina Claudine Myers, Youseff Yancy, Leonard Jones, and Jay Clayton.

== Reception ==
Professional ratings
Review scores
Source	Rating
AllMusic	2.5/5 stars
The Penguin Guide to Jazz	3/4 stars
The Rolling Stone Jazz Record Guide	2/5 stars

The Penguin Guide to Jazz awarded the album 3 stars, stating: "This drummerless band moves through the charts like information through a printed circuit, and there is an impressive simultaneity to some of the cues which suggests that at least that some of this music was predetermined and meticulously rehearsed". The Rolling Stone Jazz Record Guide said that "what should be a good band doesn't come up with much".

== Track listing ==
All compositions by Muhal Richard Abrams

1. "Triverse" - 6:01
2. "Inneroutersight" - 4:51
3. "Unichange" - 8:44
4. "Spihumonesty" - 6:23

== Personnel ==
- Muhal Richard Abrams: piano, synthesizer
- Roscoe Mitchell: alto saxophone, flute
- George Lewis: trombone, synthesizer, sousaphone
- Leonard Jones: bass
- Amina Claudine Myers: piano, organ, electric piano
- Youseff Yancy: theremin
- Jay Clayton: vocals
