= This Time... =

Studio album by Anthony Braxton
- Released: 1970
- Recorded: January 1970
- Genre: Jazz
- Length: 35:25
- Label: BYG Actuel
- Producer: Jean Georgakarakos, Jean-Luc Young

Anthony Braxton chronology
Anthony Braxton (1969)	This Time... (1970)	Recital Paris 71 (1971)

This Time... is an album by the American jazz saxophonist and composer Anthony Braxton, recorded in 1970 and released on the BYG Actuel label. As on his previous album, Braxton performs with trumpeter Wadada Leo Smith, violinist Leroy Jenkins and drummer Steve McCall.

== Reception ==
The AllMusic review by Dan Warburton called the album "wild, wonderful, insanely creative, and absolutely timeless".

Professional ratings
Review scores
Source	Rating
AllMusic	4.5/5 stars
The Penguin Guide to Jazz Recordings	3/4 stars

== Track listing ==
All compositions by Anthony Braxton

1. "Composition No 1" – 13:06
2. "Solo" – 5:42
3. "Small Composition No 1" – 2:23
4. "Small Composition No 2" – 3:07
5. "Small Composition No 3" – 1:05
6. "Small Composition No 4" – 1:59
7. "Small Composition No 5" – 4:19
8. "In the Street" – 3:58
9. "This Time" – 1:46

- Recorded in Paris in January 1970

== Personnel ==
- Anthony Braxton – alto saxophone, soprano saxophone, clarinet, contrabass clarinet, flute, sound machine, chimes, vocals
- Leo Smith – trumpet, flugelhorn, horns, wood block, siren
- Leroy Jenkins – violin, viola, flute, harmonica, accordion
- Steve McCall – drums, goblet drum, percussion
