= Neighborhoods (Olu Dara album) =

Studio album by Olu Dara
- Released: February 20, 2001
- Recorded: 2000–2001
- Genre: Blues
- Length: 43:42
- Label: Atlantic
- Producer: Yves Beauvais

Olu Dara chronology
| In the World: From Natchez to New York (1998) | Neighborhoods (2001) |

Neighborhoods is the second solo album by the jazz cornetist Olu Dara.

== Reception ==
Professional ratings
Review scores
| Source | Rating |
|---|---|
| AllMusic | 2.5/5 stars |
| Robert Christgau | B+ |
| (The New) Rolling Stone Album Guide | 3/5 stars |

A writer for Time stated that Dara "makes music that doesn't just grow on you; it grows around you, locking you in an inescapable embrace, like an oak tree that's knotted around a fence. Once his magical blend of jazz and blues gets hold of the listener, there's no escape — and no wanting to leave."

Geoffrey Himes of The Washington Post wrote: "The spontaneity of [Dara's] approach applies not only to his vocals and guitar work but also to his songwriting, which starts with a simple lyric theme and then improvises riff after riff on that idea. Observers who criticize the looseness of Dara's songwriting are missing the point; that very looseness is what allows the impulsive gestures that make his music sound so unpremeditated, so in the moment."

The A.V. Club's Stephen Thompson called the album "an agreeable trifle, with no narrative momentum and only the most tenuous unifying thread," and commented: "In the World was strong enough to earn Dara a certain amount of slack, but Neighborhoods suggests that he spent decades preparing for that album, using up virtually everything he had to say in the process."

A reviewer for the Orlando Weekly remarked: "Full of quirky narratives, mellow, semijagged riffs and an overall bucolic vibe, Olu Dara's Neighborhoods seems like a slice of life from his Natchez, Miss., roots filtered through New York's East Village... This recording is Olu Dara up front and natural."

Writing for Tinnitist, Darryl Sterdan stated: "With a sound that borders blues, jazz, pop, reggae and just about any other African-based music you can name, Neighborhoods may be world music in its truest form."

In a review for AllMusic, Scott Yanow wrote: "The music is mostly outside of jazz, more in the areas of pop, funk, reggae, and folk music. Unfortunately, the 11 performances... are not at all memorable, his singing is a bit mundane, and a guest spot for Cassandra Wilson... is rather forgettable. The results are disappointing overall."

Jay Hardwig of The Austin Chronicle called the album "a satisfying return to the groove-filled fields of Dara's musical mind," noting that it "serv[es] up Dara's trademark mix of rural groove and lyrical come-what-may, songs about love, cinema, and fruit trees building over a gentle blend of riverine funk and artful improvisation."

Critic Robert Christgau commented: "where 1998's In the World proceeded directly to limbo on the rough-hewn cobblestones of its noble intentions, here he gets somewhere. More direct rhythmically, more considerate melodically, discerningly observed and recalled until it gets all poetic on our ass, this is at least as educational as Maya Angelou, and much more fun."

A writer for Billboard remarked: "Dara inhabits many a milieu here, from the juke joints of the Mississippi Delta and the back alleys of New Orleans' rambunctious French Quarter to the farther-flung ritual of a Congolese tribal dance... Dara revels in a spontaneously joyous musical atmosphere - as if the global village had its own folklore."

== Track listing ==
1. "Massamba" (Olu Dara) – 3:58
2. "Neighborhoods" (Olu Dara) – 4:54
3. "Herbman" (Olu Dara) – 4:45
4. "Strange Things Happen Everyday" (Olu Dara) – 3:26
5. "Bell & Ponce (At the Movie Show)" (Olu Dara) – 3:50
6. "I See the Light" (Olu Dara) – 4:09
7. "Out on the Rolling Sea" (Traditional) – 3:57
8. "Bluebird" (Olu Dara) – 4:30
9. "Used to Be" (Ah-Keisha McCants, Olu Dara) – 3:18
10. "Red Ant (Nature)" (Olu Dara) – 4:10
11. "Tree Blues" (Olu Dara) – 2:35

== Personnel ==
- Olu Dara – vocals, cornet, woodwinds, guitar, handclaps, harmonica
- John Abrams – tenor saxophone
- Kwatei Jones-Quartey – guitar
- Ivan Ramirez – guitar
- Dr. John – organ, electric piano
- Rod Williams – organ, piano
- Fredger "Saïd" Dupree – electric piano
- Alonzo "Skip" Gardner – bass
- Larry Johnson – drums
- Greg Bandy – drums
- Coster Massamba – percussion, vocals
- Cantrese Alloway, Rucyl Mills, Terrill Joyner – backing vocals
- Cassandra Wilson – vocals (track 9)
