= When Was That? =

Studio album by Henry Threadgill
- Released: 1982
- Recorded: September 30 & October 1, 1981
- Genre: Jazz
- Label: About Time

Henry Threadgill chronology
X-75 Volume 1 (1979)	When Was That? (1982)	Just the Facts and Pass the Bucket (1983)

Professional ratings
Review scores
Source	Rating
AllMusic	4.5/5 stars
The Rolling Stone Jazz Record Guide	3/5 stars

When Was That? is an album by Henry Threadgill released on the About Time label in 1982. The album and features five of Threadgill's compositions performed by Threadgill with Craig Harris, Olu Dara, Fred Hopkins, Brian Smith, Pheeroan akLaff and John Betsch.

== Reception ==
The AllMusic review by Thom Jurek states, "Threadgill's main thrust was to create a series of modal environments whereby all instrumentalists would engage with one another in the framework of a particular tune, yet play different roles as the ensemble went on its way through the record... Ultimately, however, this band swung together, no matter how far out the proceedings got. They always returned to Threadgill's magically inherent lyricism and humor in the end, and each and every track here bears that out. This is a nearly mystical album in the life of this band".

In The Boston Phoenix, Bob Blumenthal felt that "For all the talent collected here, When Was That? is a frustrating record. Threadgill extracts thick, varnished gloss from the ensemble, and then dissipates the effect by giving three of the five pieces over to somber, almost furtive collective meditations. [...] In fixed tempo, Threadgill's "sextet" is something else. The bass and drum teams lock together and play around each other, and the atmosphere turns celebratory."

== Track listing ==
All compositions by Henry Threadgill

1. "Melin" - 3:40
2. "10 to 1" - 11:29
3. "Just B" - 4:25
4. "When Was That?" - 10:22
5. "Soft Suicide at the Baths" - 11:07

Recorded at Sound Ideas, New York City on September 30 and October 1, 1981

== Personnel ==
- Henry Threadgill - alto saxophone, tenor saxophone, clarinet, flute, bass flute
- Craig Harris - trombone
- Olu Dara - cornet
- Brian Smith - piccolo bass
- Fred Hopkins - bass
- John Betsch - drums
- Pheeroan akLaff - drums
