= Holding Together =

Studio album by Oliver Lake
- Released: 1976
- Recorded: March 1976
- Genre: Jazz
- Length: 40:31
- Label: Black Saint
- Producer: Giacomo Pellicciotti

Oliver Lake chronology
Heavy Spirits (1975)	Holding Together (1976)	Ntu: Point from Which Creation Begins (1976)

Holding Together is an album by American jazz saxophonist Oliver Lake, recorded in 1975 for the Italian Black Saint label.

== Reception ==
Professional ratings
Review scores
Source	Rating
AllMusic	4/5 stars
The Penguin Guide to Jazz Recordings	3/4 stars
The Rolling Stone Jazz Record Guide	5/5 stars

The AllMusic review awarded the album 4 stars.

== Track listing ==
All compositions by Oliver Lake except as indicated

1. "Trailway Shake/Sad Lo-Uis" – 10:04
2. "Hasan" – 4:12
3. "USTA B" – 6:25
4. "Holding Together" – 10:30
5. "Machine Wing" – 7:39
6. "Ballad" (Michael Gregory Jackson) – 1:41

- Recorded at Generation Sound Studios in New York City in March, 1976

== Personnel ==
- Oliver Lake – alto saxophone, soprano saxophone, flute, percussion
- Michael Gregory Jackson – guitar, mandolin, bamboo flute, percussion, vocals
- Fred Hopkins – bass
- Paul Maddox – drums, percussion
