= In the World: From Natchez to New York =

Studio album by Olu Dara
- Released: February 17, 1998
- Recorded: 1997
- Genre: Jazz
- Length: 46:49
- Label: Atlantic
- Producer: Yves Beauvais, Olu Dara

Olu Dara chronology
| In the World: From Natchez to New York (1998) | Neighborhoods (2001) |

In the World: From Natchez to New York is the solo debut album by the jazz cornetist Olu Dara, released in 1998. Dara also sings and plays guitar on the album.

The album peaked at No. 19 on the Billboard Traditional Jazz Albums chart.

== Critical reception ==
Professional ratings
Review scores
| Source | Rating |
|---|---|
| AllMusic | 4/5 stars |
| Robert Christgau | (dud) |
| (The New) Rolling Stone Album Guide | 3.5/5 stars |

The Washington Post's Geoffrey Himes wrote: "Mixing up sly humor and evocative description, Dara's singing slips and slides around the steady guitar rhythms, which borrow equally from Delta blues, Caribbean calypso and West African high-life."

In a review for AllMusic, Scott Yanow called the album a "fascinating and successful effort," and stated: "Dara emerges here as an effective country-blues singer and guitarist. Fortunately, Dara does not neglect his cornet but the music is definitely much different than one might expect."

Derk Richardson of SFGate commented: "Performing songs about daily life in the 'hood back in the day of okra-selling street peddlers, intoning blues that refuse to separate desire from its cultural context, and collaborating with his rap star son Nas, Dara manifests an aesthetic co-inhabited by Robert Johnson, Tampa Red, Charles Mingus, Dizzy Gillespie and Arrested Development's Speech as if they were all members of the same band."

Writing for JazzTimes, Bret Primack described the album as "a cohesive creation that seamlessly weaves diverse elements in new and intriguing ways," and noted: "Flying below the radar of commercial media, Dara has managed to chart a course for his creativity by 'having my hand in many ways of expressing myself'."

A reviewer for CMJ New Music Report remarked: "As warm and as gentle as a summer day in Mississippi, the appropriately named album is a perfect blend of Southern blues, New York jazz and African rhythms... [its] seductive groove, cool melodies and spare lyrics result in pure enchantment."

== Track listing ==
1. "Okra" – 4:48
2. "Rain Shower" – 4:34
3. "Natchez Shopping Blues" – 3:34
4. "Your Lips" – 3:58
5. "Harlem Country Girl" – 5:47
6. "Zora" – 3:14
7. "Young Mama" – 4:44
8. "Bubber (If Only)" – 3:04
9. "Father Blues" – 3:32
10. "Jungle Jay" featuring Nas – 5:02
11. "Kiane" – 4:32

== Personnel ==
- Olu Dara – lead vocals, cornet, trumpet, guitar, bass drum, percussion, backing vocals
- Nas – vocals (track 10)
- Kwatei Jones-Quartey – acoustic guitar, electric guitar, percussion
- Ivan Ramirez – electric guitar
- Rudy "Obadeli" Herbert – organ
- Alonzo Gardner – bass
- Greg Bandy – drums
- Richard James – congas
- Cantrese Alloway, Darada David, Joyce Malone, Melba Joyce – backing vocals
