= Air Mail (album) =

Studio album by Air
- Released: 1981
- Recorded: 28 December 1980
- Genre: Jazz
- Length: 35:41
- Label: Black Saint
- Producer: Giovanni Bonandrini

Air chronology
Air Lore (1979)	Air Mail (1981)	80° Below '82 (1982)

Air Mail is an album by the improvisational collective Air featuring Henry Threadgill, Steve McCall, and Fred Hopkins, recorded for the Italian Black Saint label. The album consists of three compositions dedicated to the photographer Bobbie Kingsley, Ronnie Boykins, and Cecil Taylor & Jimmy Lyons.

== Reception ==
The Penguin Guide to Jazz selected this album as part of its suggested Core Collection.

The AllMusic review by Ron Wynn stated: "The Chicago trio Air was at a high point on this 1980 date".

Professional ratings
Review scores
Source	Rating
AllMusic	4/5 stars
The Penguin Guide to Jazz	3/4 stars
The Rolling Stone Jazz Record Guide	4/5 stars

== Track listing ==
1. "B. K." (Steve McCall) – 8:55
2. "R. B." (Fred Hopkins) – 8:19
3. "C. T., J. L." (Henry Threadgill) – 18:27
  - Recorded at Right Track Studio, New York City on December 28, 1980

== Personnel ==
- Henry Threadgill – tenor saxophone, alto saxophone, flute, bass flute, hubkaphone
- Fred Hopkins – bass
- Steve McCall – drums, bells
