= Heavy Spirits =

Studio album by Oliver Lake
- Released: 1975
- Recorded: January 31 & February 3, 1975
- Genre: Jazz
- Length: 40:06
- Label: Arista Freedom
- Producer: Michael Cuscuna

Oliver Lake chronology
Passin' Thru (1974)	Heavy Spirits (1975)	Holding Together (1976)

Heavy Spirits is an album by American jazz saxophonist Oliver Lake, recorded in 1975 and released on the Arista Freedom label. The album features Lake playing in different settings: three quintet tracks with Olu Dara on trumpet, Donald Smith on piano, Stafford James on bass, and Victor Lewis on drums, three more tracks with Lake backed by three violinists, a trio piece with trombonist Joseph Bowie and drummer Charles "Bobo" Shaw, and a solo sax piece.

== Reception ==
Professional ratings
Review scores
Source	Rating
AllMusic	4.5/5 stars
The Penguin Guide to Jazz	3/4 stars

In his review for AllMusic, Scott Yanow states, "This will be one of the least accessible of altoist Oliver Lake's recordings for most people but repeated listenings reveal a great deal of beauty."

The Penguin Guide to Jazz says, "Heavy Spirits seems, at this distance, like a relic of an exciting period in the American avant-garde.. Hit and miss, but untempered and often intriguing."

== Track listing ==
All compositions by Oliver Lake except as indicated

1. "While Pushing Down Turn" – 11:50
2. "Owshet" – 5:43
3. "Heavy Spirits" – 2:55
4. "Movements Equals Creation" – 1:33
5. "Altoviolin" – 2:32
6. "Intensity" – 2:23
7. "Lonely Blacks" (Julius Hemphill) – 3:45
8. "Rocket" – 9:25

- Recorded at C.I. Recording Studio, New York City, on January 31, 1975 (tracks 1–3, 8), and Music Designer Studios, Boston, on February 3, 1975 (track 4–7)

== Personnel ==
- Oliver Lake – alto sax
- Olu Dara – trumpet on 1, 2, 3
- Donald Smith – piano on 1, 2, 3
- Stafford James – bass on 1, 2, 3
- Victor Lewis – drums on 1, 2, 3
- Al Philemon Jones – violin on 4, 5, 6
- Steve Peisch – violin on 4, 5, 6
- C. Panton – violin on 4, 5, 6
- Joseph Bowie – trombone on 8
- Charles "Bobo" Shaw – drums on 8
