= 1-OQA+19 =

Studio album by Muhal Richard Abrams
- Released: 1978
- Recorded: November–December 1977
- Genre: Jazz
- Length: 41:52
- Label: Black Saint
- Producer: Giacomo Pellicciotti

Muhal Richard Abrams chronology
Sightsong (1976)	1-OQA+19 (1978)	Lifea Blinec (1979)

1-OQA+19 is an album by Muhal Richard Abrams, released on the Italian Black Saint label in 1977. It features performances by Abrams, Anthony Braxton, Henry Threadgill, Steve McCall and Leonard Jones.

== Reception ==
The AllMusic review states: "The unit made demanding, harmonically dense and rhythmically unpredictable material, with Braxton's scurrying solos ably matched by Threadgill's bluesier lines and Abrams' leadership and inventive blend of jazz, blues, and other sources holding things together". The Penguin Guide to Jazz awarded the album 3 stars, stating: "Anthony Braxton is one of the certain masters modern jazz and perhaps Abrams's most gifted pupil. The music they make together is complex, scurryingly allusive and seldom directly appealing". The Rolling Stone Jazz Record Guide said that "Abrams the small group leader has never sounded better".

Professional ratings
Review scores
Source	Rating
AllMusic	2.5/5 stars
The Penguin Guide to Jazz	3/4 stars
The Rolling Stone Jazz Record Guide	4/5 stars

== Track listing ==
All tracks are written by Muhal Richard Abrams.

No.	Title	Length
1.	"Charlie in the Parker"	9:05
2.	"Balladi"	9:07
3.	"Arhythm Songy"	8:53
4.	"Oqa"	6:58
5.	"Ritob"	7:49

- Recorded in November–December 1977 at Generation Sound Studios, New York City

== Personnel ==
- Muhal Richard Abrams: piano, synthesizer, voice
- Henry Threadgill: alto saxophone, tenor saxophone, flute, voice
- Anthony Braxton: soprano saxophone, alto saxophone, flute, clarinet, voice
- Leonard Jones: bass, voice
- Steve McCall: drums, percussion, voice
