= Gittin' to Know Y'All =

1970 studio album by various artists

Studio album by Lester Bowie
- Released: 1970
- Recorded: December 12–14, 1969
- Genre: Jazz
- Length: 44:33
- Label: MPS
- Producer: Joachim Berendt

Lester Bowie chronology
Numbers 1 & 2 (1967)	Gittin' to Know Y'All (1970)	Fast Last! (1974)

Gittin' to Know Y'All is a various artists album recorded during the annual Baden-Baden Free Jazz Meeting in 1969 and released on the MPS label in 1970. It features one track by the Baden-Baden Free Jazz Orchestra conducted by trumpeter Lester Bowie, one by the Terje Rypdal Group, one by Karin Krog, and one by The Willem Breuker-John Surman Duo. This session was the first time that many of these European and American jazz musicians performed together in a large group setting.

== Reception ==
The Allmusic review awarded the album 3 stars.

Professional ratings
Review scores
Source	Rating
Allmusic	3/5 stars

== Track listing ==
1. "Gittin' to Know Y'All" (Bowie) - 32:00
2. "Ved Soerevatn" (Rypdal) - 5:00
3. "For My Two J.B.'s" (Krog) - 1:06
4. "May Hunting Song" (Breuker) - 4:47

- Recorded live during the annual Baden-Baden Free Jazz Meeting at Südwestfunk UKO Studio I on December 12 to 14, 1969.

== Personnel ==
Track 1 - The Baden-Baden Free Jazz Orchestra conducted by Lester Bowie

- Lester Bowie: trumpet and conductor
- Hugh Steinmetz: trumpet
- Kenny Wheeler: trumpet
- Albert Mangelsdorff: trombone
- Eje Thelin: trombone
- Joseph Jarman: soprano saxophone
- Roscoe Mitchell: alto saxophone
- Alan Skidmore: tenor saxophone
- Heinz Sauer: tenor saxophone
- Gerd Dudek: tenor saxophone
- Bernt Rosengren: tenor saxophone
- John Surman: baritone saxophone
- Willem Breuker: bass clarinet
- Terje Rypdal: guitar
- Dave Burrell: piano
- Leo Cuypers: prepared piano
- Barre Phillips: bass
- Palle Danielsson: bass
- Steve McCall: drums
- Tony Oxley: drums
- Claude Delcloo: drums

Track 2 - The Terje Rypdal Group

- Terje Rypdal: guitar
- Claude Delcloo: bells
- Joseph Jarman: flute
- Bernt Rosengren: flute, oboe
- Karin Krog: vocals
- Barre Phillips: bass
- Palle Danielsson: bass
- Steve McCall: drums

Track 3 - Karin Krog

- Karin Krog: vocals

Track 4 - The Willem Breuker-John Surman Duo

- John Surman: bass clarinet
- Willem Breuker: bass clarinet
