= Flowers for Albert: The Complete Concert =

Live album by David Murray
- Released: 1976
- Recorded: June 26, 1976
- Genre: Jazz
- Length: 93:24
- Label: India Navigation
- Producer: Bob Cummins

David Murray chronology
Low Class Conspiracy (1976)	Flowers for Albert: The Complete Concert (1976)	Interboogieology (1980)

Flowers for Albert is a jazz album by David Murray, released on the India Navigation label in 1976 and re-released in 1996 with three additional tracks (tracks 2, 4 & 6). It features a live performance by Murray, trumpeter Olu Dara, bassist Fred Hopkins and drummer Phillip Wilson recorded in concert at the Ladies' Fort, NYC.

== Reception ==
The AllMusic review by Scott Yanow stated, "The music is often quite free but it also takes its time, showing high energy in well-chosen spots. Since this period David Murray has lived up to his great potential".

Professional ratings
Review scores
Source	Rating
AllMusic	4/5 stars
The Rolling Stone Jazz Record Guide	3/5 stars

== Track listing ==
All compositions by David Murray except as indicated

1. "Flowers for Albert" - 14:18
2. "Santa Barbara and Crenshaw Follies" - 15:53
3. "Joanne's Green Satin Dress" (Morris) - 12:56
4. "After All This" - 13:59
5. "Roscoe" - 9:05
6. "The Hill" - 17:55
7. "Ballad for a Decomposed Beauty" - 9:18
- Recorded in concert at the Ladies' Fort, NYC, June 26, 1976

== Personnel ==
- David Murray - tenor saxophone
- Olu Dara - trumpet
- Fred Hopkins - bass
- Phillip Wilson - drums
