= In the Tradition (Arthur Blythe album) =

Studio album by Arthur Blythe
- Released: 1979
- Recorded: October 1978
- Genre: Jazz
- Label: Columbia

Arthur Blythe chronology
Bush Baby (1977)	In the Tradition (1979)	Lenox Avenue Breakdown (1979)

In the Tradition is an album by the American jazz saxophonist Arthur Blythe. His first album for the Columbia label, it was recorded in New York City in 1978.

== Critical reception ==
Professional ratings
Review scores
Source	Rating
AllMusic	4.5/5 stars
DownBeat	4/5 stars
The Rolling Stone Jazz Record Guide	3/5 stars

The Globe and Mail wrote: "Everyone plays well in showcasing the leader's alto sax, so richly cheesy that it's almost an exaggeration of the instrument. But the leader himself doesn't bring anything particularly distinctive to this music."

The AllMusic review by Scott Yanow states: "The instrumentation of his quartet is conventional but the musicianship is exceptionally high".

== Track listing ==
All compositions by Arthur Blythe except as indicated

1. "Jitterbug Waltz" (Fats Waller) - 4:34
2. "In a Sentimental Mood" (Duke Ellington) - 7:45
3. "Break Tune" - 3:03
4. "Caravan" (Juan Tizol) - 5:22
5. "Hip Dripper" - 4:35
6. "Naima" (John Coltrane) - 6:44

- Recorded at the Brook in New York City on February 26, 1977.

== Personnel ==
- Arthur Blythe – alto saxophone
- Stanley Cowell – piano
- Fred Hopkins – bass
- Steve McCall – drums
