= Morning Prayer (album) =

1976 Chico Freeman album

Morning Prayer is a 1976 album by Chico Freeman, released on India Navigation and the Japanese Whynot Records.

== Track listing ==
All selections composed and arranged by Chico Freeman

1. "Like the Kind of Peace It is"
2. "The In Between"
3. "Conversations"
4. "Morning Prayer"
5. "Pepe's Samba"
6. "Pepe's Samba" (long version)

== Personnel ==
- Chico Freeman - ts, ss, fl, pan-pipe, perc
- Henry Threadgill - a, bs, fl, perc
- Muhal Richard Abrams - p
- Cecil McBee - b, cello
- Steve McCall - perc
- Ben Montgomery - ds, perc
- Douglas Ewart - b-fl, bamboo-fl, perc

== Notes ==
- Composed and arranged by Chico Freeman
- Produced by Masahiko Yuh
- Recorded by Paul Serrano, September 8, 1976 at P.S. Studios, Chicago
