= Air Time =

Studio album by Air
- Released: 1978
- Recorded: November 17 & 18, 1977
- Studio: Streeterville, Chicago
- Genre: Jazz
- Length: 43:38
- Label: Nessa

Air chronology
Live Air (1977)	Air Time (1978)	Open Air Suit (1978)

Air Time is an album by the improvisational collective Air, released in 1978. Henry Threadgill, Steve McCall, and Fred Hopkins perform three of Threadgill's compositions and one each by Hopkins and McCall.

== Reception ==
The Penguin Guide to Jazz selected this album as part of its suggested Core Collection, stating: "Listening in detail to its five tracks ...helps illuminate much of the group's language, its vivid exploitation of splintered tempi, deliberately awkward and raucous phrasing, devices from other musical traditions ...and most particularly the use of percussion as another voiced and pitched instrument".

In his AllMusic review, Scott Yanow comments: "The trio Air aimed to have close interplay between three musical equals. This Nessa release (their first recording for an American label) has plenty of explorative solos". The Rolling Stone Jazz Record Guide said: "Air Time is probably the best single album indication of the band's range".

Professional ratings
Review scores
Source	Rating
AllMusic	4/5 stars
The Penguin Guide to Jazz	4/4 stars
The Rolling Stone Jazz Record Guide	5/5 stars

== Track listing ==
All compositions by Henry Threadgill except as indicated

1. "I'll Be Right Here Waiting..." (Steve McCall) – 2:29
2. "No. 2" – 11:46
3. "G.v.E." (Fred Hopkins) – 6:59
4. "Subtraction" – 13:20
5. "Keep Right on Playing Thru the Mirror Over the Water" – 9:04
- Recorded at Streeterville Studios, Chicago, IL, on November 17 (tracks 2 & 3) & November 18 (tracks 1, 4 & 5), 1977

== Personnel ==
- Henry Threadgill – alto saxophone, tenor saxophone, flute, bass flute, hubkaphone
- Fred Hopkins – bass
- Steve McCall – drums, percussion
