= Lifea Blinec =

Studio album by Muhal Richard Abrams
- Released: 1978
- Recorded: February 1978
- Genre: Jazz
- Length: 39:32
- Label: Arista/Novus

Muhal Richard Abrams chronology
1-OQA+19 (1978)	Lifea Blinec (1978)	Spiral Live at Montreux 1978 (1978)

Lifea Blinec is an album by the American musician Muhal Richard Abrams, released on the Arista Novus label in 1978. It features performances by Abrams, Joseph Jarman, Douglas Ewart, Amina Claudine Myers and Thurman Barker.

== Reception ==
Professional ratings
Review scores
Source	Rating
AllMusic	3.5/5 stars

The New York Times wrote that "the instrumentation ... is provocative but often ungainly; the thicker textures tend to become muddy."

The AllMusic review stated: "Muhal Richard Abrams headed one of his finest small combos on this intense quintet session from 1978."

== Track listing ==
All compositions by Muhal Richard Abrams

1. "Bud P. (Dedicated to Bud Powell)" - 7:52
2. "Lifea Blinec" - 10:02
3. "Ja Do Thu (Dedicated to Jarman, Douglas & Thurman)" - 8:19
4. "Duo 1" - 8:18
5. "Duo 2" - 5:01
- Recorded at Gravado Streeterville Recording Studio in Chicago, February 1978

== Personnel ==
- Muhal Richard Abrams: piano, percussion, conductor
- Joseph Jarman: bass saxophone, bassoon, alto clarinet, flute, soprano saxophone, percussion, vocals
- Douglas Ewart: bass clarinet, soprano clarinet, bassoon, alto saxophone, tenor saxophone, percussion
- Amina Claudine Myers: piano
- Thurman Barker: drums, percussion
