= Makin' a Move =

Studio album by Henry Threadgill
- Released: 1995
- Recorded: June 1995
- Studio: Electric Lady Studios, N.Y.C.
- Genre: Jazz
- Length: 64:15
- Label: Columbia
- Producer: Bill Laswell, Henry Threadgill

Henry Threadgill chronology
Carry the Day (1995)	Makin' a Move (1995)	Where's Your Cup? (1996)

Makin' a Move is an album by Henry Threadgill released on the Columbia label in 1996. The album features four songs by the Very Very Circus group and three compositions scored mainly for guitars and cellos.

== Reception ==
The Allmusic review by Glenn Astarita awarded the album 4 stars, stating, "Makin' a Move signifies yet another fascinating glimpse of Threadgill's exclusive artistry".

Professional ratings
Review scores
Source	Rating
Allmusic	4/5 stars

== Track listing ==
All compositions by Henry Threadgill

1. "Noisy Flowers" - 6:42
2. "Like It Feels" - 11:16
3. "Official Silence" - 8:54
4. "Refined Poverty" - 9:04
5. "Make Hot and Give" - 7:56
6. "The Mockingbird Sin" - 12:13
7. "Dirty in the Right Places" - 8:10

== Personnel ==
On 2, 3, 5 and 7:

- Henry Threadgill - alto saxophone
- Mark Taylor - french horn
- Brandon Ross, Ed Cherry - electric guitar
- Edwin Rodriguez, Marcus Rojas - tuba
- Pheeroan akLaff - drums

On 1, 4 and 6:

- Henry Threadgill - alto saxophone (track 4)
- Myra Melford - piano (track 1)
- Brandon Ross, James Emery - nylon string soprano guitar (tracks 1 & 6)
- Ed Cherry - steel-string acoustic guitar (tracks 1 & 6)
- Ayodele Aubert - classical guitar (tracks 1 & 6)
- Michelle Kinney, Diedre Murray, Akua Dixon Turre - cello (tracks 4 & 6)
