= Air Lore =

Studio album by Air
- Released: 1979
- Recorded: May 11 & 12, 1979
- Studio: C.I. Recording Studios, New York City
- Genre: Jazz, free jazz
- Length: 36:33
- Label: Arista Novus
- Producer: Michael Cuscuna

Air chronology
Montreux Suisse (1978)	Air Lore (1979)	Air Mail (1981)

Air Lore is an album by the improvisational trio Air featuring Henry Threadgill, Steve McCall, and Fred Hopkins performing compositions by Jelly Roll Morton and Scott Joplin. It was reissued on compact disc by Bluebird/RCA in 1987 and included in the eight-CD box set, Complete Novus and Columbia Recordings of Henry Threadgill and Air on Mosaic Records.

== Reception ==
Professional ratings
Review scores
Source	Rating
AllMusic	4.5/5 stars
Christgau's Record Guide	A
The Penguin Guide to Jazz	3.5/4 stars
The Rolling Stone Jazz Record Guide	5/5 stars
DownBeat	5/5 stars

The AllMusic review by Thom Jurek stated: "Through it all, this remains the album most Air fans love most, precisely because of all the joy and irreverence in the proceedings, which didn't update the old music, but brought it into focus for the revolutionary improvisational template that it is". Bob Blumenthal in The Rolling Stone Jazz Record Guide said, "if one Air album belongs in every collection it is Air Lore, a 1979 performance of Scott Joplin rags and Jelly Roll Morton tunes that is currently unsurpassed as a statement of historical homage from the perspective of the frontiers". Gary Giddins considers Air Lore "Air's most remarkable achievement" and "a torrid and funny inquiry into ragtime and blues," calling it "Threadgill's key statement on the repertory mania and tradition-mongering that gripped jazz in the '70s and '80s and a forceful refutation of the academicism that too often sucks the life's blood out of classic jazz."

DownBeat assigned the album 5 stars. Reviewer Douglas Clark wrote, "Jazz of the absurd is what this is. It’s a kind of avant garde vaudeville, infused with wackiness whereby contradictions are commonplace. Old and new run together; the lines between melancholy, rage and cornball comedy disappear. Air has cultivated naivete to make this music; it has courted ambiguity. Air Lore is an oddball masterpiece".

== Track listing ==
1. "The Ragtime Dance" (Scott Joplin) – 9:20
2. "Buddy Bolden's Blues (Jelly Roll Morton) – 9:30
3. "King Porter Stomp" (Jelly Roll Morton) – 3:52
4. "Paille Street" (Henry Threadgill) – 2:20
5. "Weeping Willow Rag" (Scott Joplin) – 11:31

== Personnel ==
- Henry Threadgill – alto saxophone, tenor saxophone, flute
- Fred Hopkins – double bass
- Steve McCall – drums, percussion
