= Morning Song (David Murray album) =

Studio album by David Murray Quartet
- Released: 1983
- Recorded: September 25, 26 & 30, 1983
- Genre: Jazz
- Length: 41:58
- Label: Black Saint
- Producer: Giovanni Bonandrini

David Murray Quartet chronology
Murray's Steps (1982)	Morning Song (1983)	Live at Sweet Basil Volume 1 (1984)

Morning Song is an album by David Murray, released on the Italian Black Saint label in 1983. It features performances by Murray, John Hicks, Reggie Workman and Ed Blackwell.

== Reception ==
The Rolling Stone Jazz Record Guide called it "an inspired mixture of originals and standards", giving it five stars.

The AllMusic review by Scott Yanow stated:

"For David Murray, this is a fairly straightforward quartet date. Joined by pianist John Hicks, bassist Reggie Workman and drummer Ed Blackwell, Murray performs three of his lesser-known originals, Butch Morris' 'Light Blue Frolic,' 'Body and Soul' and 'Jitterbug Waltz.' Doubling on tenor and bass clarinet, Murray as usual has a tendency to jump into the extreme upper register a bit too much at unexpected times, disrupting a relatively mellow mood on a few occasions. But one cannot deny his musicianship, and there are some exciting moments to be heard during this program."

Professional ratings
Review scores
Source	Rating
AllMusic	4/5 stars
The Penguin Guide to Jazz Recordings	3.5/4 stars
The Rolling Stone Jazz Record Guide	5/5 stars

== Track listing ==
1. "Morning Song" – 8:05
2. "Body and Soul" (Eyton, Green, Heyman, Sour) – 6:50
3. "Light Blue Frolic" (Morris) – 7:27
4. "Jitterbug Waltz" (Maltby, Waller) – 6:26
5. "The Off Season" – 10:56
6. "Duet" – 2:14

All compositions by David Murray except as indicated
- Recorded at Vanguard Studios, NYC, September 25, 26 & 30,1983

== Personnel ==
- David Murray–tenor saxophone, bass clarinet
- John Hicks–piano
- Reggie Workman–bass
- Ed Blackwell–drums
