= Home (David Murray album) =

Studio album by David Murray Octet
- Released: 1982
- Recorded: October 31 & November 1, 1981
- Genre: Jazz
- Length: 38:35
- Label: Black Saint
- Producer: Giovanni Bonandrini, David Murray

David Murray Octet chronology
| Ming (1980) | Home (1982) | Murray's Steps (1982) |

Home is an album by David Murray, released in 1982 on the Italian Black Saint label and the second to feature his Octet. It features performances by Murray, Henry Threadgill, Olu Dara, Lawrence "Butch" Morris, George E. Lewis, Anthony Davis, Wilbur Morris and Steve McCall.

== Reception ==
Professional ratings
Review scores
| Source | Rating |
|---|---|
| AllMusic | 4.5/5 stars |
| The Penguin Guide to Jazz | 3.5/4 stars |
| The Rolling Stone Jazz Record Guide | 5/5 stars |

Robert Palmer reviewed the album for The New York Times, writing that Ming "was an arresting record when it first appeared in 1980, but it seems to have been a dress rehearsal for the new album, Home...an apt title, for on this record David Murray stakes out a territory he can call his own, but a territory that nevertheless offers considerable room for growth. His writing and arranging for the five horns, piano, bass and drums he works with here is as idiomatic as his saxophone playing. There are references to Duke Ellington and Charles Mingus and Eric Dolphy, and two ensemble styles from Dixieland to rhythm-and-blues. Whiplash horn unisons and brassy shouts give way to dense but buoyant welters of independent melody lines, collective improvisations, and barreling solos."

The Penguin Guide to Jazz selected this album, along with its predecessor Ming, as part of its suggested Core Collection, writing that "Home is very nearly the better album. The slow opening title-piece is a delicately layered ballad with gorgeous horn voicing. 'Last of the Hipmen' is one of his best pieces, and the Anthony Davis vamp that leads out of Steve McCall's intelligent and exuberant solo is a reminder of how close to Ellington's bandleading philosophy Murray has come by instinct rather than design."

The Rolling Stone Jazz Record Guide said, "both Ming and Home display an excellent balance between written material and solos by a distinguished group of sidemen". The AllMusic review by Scott Yanow stated: "All of the brilliant players have their opportunities to make strong contributions to Murray's five originals (best known of which is '3-D Family'), and the leader's writing is consistently colorful and unpredictable. Recommended."

== Track listing ==
1. "Home" – 5:58
2. "Santa Barbara and Crenshaw Follies" – 7:30
3. "Choctaw Blues" – 7:20
4. "Last of the Hipmen" – 9:12
5. "3-D Family" – 8:35

All compositions by David Murray

- Recorded at Right Track Recording Studios, NYC, October 31 & November 1, 1981

== Personnel ==
- David Murray – tenor saxophone, bass clarinet
- Henry Threadgill – alto saxophone, flute, alto flute
- Olu Dara – trumpet
- Lawrence "Butch" Morris – cornet
- George E. Lewis – trombone
- Anthony Davis – piano
- Wilber Morris – bass
- Steve McCall – drums
