= Silence (Anthony Braxton album) =

Studio album by Anthony Braxton, Leo Smith and Leroy Jenkins
- Released: 1975
- Recorded: June 1969; Chicago, IL
- Genre: Jazz
- Length: 31:25
- Label: Freedom; FLP 40123
- Producer: Alan Bates

Anthony Braxton chronology
For Alto (1969)	Silence (1975)	Anthony Braxton (1969)

Silence is an album by saxophonist Anthony Braxton, trumpeter Leo Smith and violinist Leroy Jenkins, recorded in 1969 and originally released on the Freedom label in 1975.

== Reception ==
Professional ratings
Review scores
Source	Rating
AllMusic	4/5 stars

The AllMusic review by Brian Olewnick stated, "They're wonderful works, exploring a terrain similar to that being investigated by the Art Ensemble of Chicago around the same time: barebones themes allowing for substantial free improvisation that dealt as much with sonic space and the generation of unusual textures as anything else. 'Silence,' as the title implies, is largely concerned with the disposition of sounds in space and shows the strong influence that the contemporary classical world, particularly John Cage, had on these musicians in their early years". In JazzTimes, Bill Shoemaker wrote, "Silence is the only album Braxton recorded featuring the ostensibly co-op trio with violinist Leroy Jenkins and trumpeter Leo Smith that did not feature Braxton's compositions. Jenkins' 'Off The Top Of My Head' is thematically well-grounded, allowing the trio to peel off layers of the lyrical materials in a loose counterpoint, and to propel the piece with the shifting timbres afforded by their arsenal of 'little instruments.' Smith's title piece juxtaposes short sound events and long periods of silence to create a remarkably coherent fabric".

== Track listing ==
1. "Off the Top of My Head" (Leroy Jenkins) - 16:43
2. "Silence" (Leo Smith) - 14:42

== Personnel ==
- Anthony Braxton - reeds, miscellaneous instruments
- Leo Smith - trumpet, miscellaneous instruments
- Leroy Jenkins - violin, miscellaneous instruments
