= Air Show No. 1 =

Studio album by New Air
- Released: 1986
- Recorded: June 2 & 3, 1986
- Genre: Jazz
- Length: 41:30
- Label: Black Saint
- Producer: Giovanni Bonandrini

New Air chronology
| Live at Montreal International Jazz Festival (1984) | Air Show No. 1 (1986) |

Air Show No. 1 is an album recorded for the Italian Black Saint label by the improvisational collective New Air, featuring Henry Threadgill, Fred Hopkins and Pheeroan akLaff, with Cassandra Wilson providing vocals on three selections.

== Reception ==
The AllMusic review by Scott Yanow stated, "[Wilson] does an expert job of fitting into this complex music, giving a strong blues feeling to some of altoist Henry Threadgill's originals".

Professional ratings
Review scores
| Source | Rating |
|---|---|
| AllMusic | 4/5 stars |
| The Penguin Guide to Jazz Recordings | 3/4 stars |

== Track listing ==
All compositions by Henry Threadgill

1. "Achtud El Buod (Children's Song)" – 6:28
2. "Don't Drink That Corner My Life Is in the Bush" (lyrics by Cassandra Wilson) – 9:13
3. "Air Show" – 5:20
4. "Apricots on Their Wings" – 6:03
5. "Salute to the Enema Bandit" – 7:20
6. "Side Step" – 7:06
  - Recorded at Barigozzi Studio, Milano, Italy, on June 2 & 3, 1986

== Personnel ==
- Henry Threadgill – alto saxophone, tenor saxophone, flute, eastern banjo
- Fred Hopkins – bass
- Pheeroan akLaff – percussion
- Cassandra Wilson – vocals
