= Just the Facts and Pass the Bucket =

Studio album by Henry Threadgill
- Released: 1983
- Recorded: March 22 & 23, 1983
- Genre: Jazz
- Label: About Time

Henry Threadgill chronology
When Was That? (1982)	Just the Facts and Pass the Bucket (1983)	Subject to Change (1985)

Professional ratings
Review scores
Source	Rating
AllMusic	4/5 stars
The Rolling Stone Jazz Record Guide	4/5 stars

Just the Facts and Pass the Bucket is an album by Henry Threadgill released on the About Time label in 1983. The album features six of Threadgill's compositions performed by Threadgill with Craig Harris, Olu Dara, Fred Hopkins, Diedre Murray, Pheeroan akLaff and John Betsch.

== Reception ==
The AllMusic review by Arwulf Arwulf states, "Musically, this album is a marvel of collective creativity. Threadgill's approach to his art is comparable to that of Muhal Richard Abrams and other cardinal members of the Association for the Advancement of Creative Musicians".

== Track listing ==
All compositions by Henry Threadgill

1. "Gateway" - 9:08
2. "Cover" - 7:09
3. "Black Blues" - 4:32
4. "Just the Facts and Pass the Bucket" - 4:25
5. "Cremation" - 6:04
6. "A Man Called Trinity Deliverance" - 8:34

Recorded at Right Track Studios, New York City on March 22 & 23, 1983

== Personnel ==
- Henry Threadgill - alto saxophone, baritone saxophone, clarinet, flute
- Olu Dara - cornet
- Craig Harris - trombone
- Diedre Murray - cello
- Fred Hopkins - bass
- John Betsch - percussion
- Pheeroan akLaff - percussion
