= Open Air Suit =

Studio album by Air
- Released: 1978
- Recorded: February 21 & 22, 1978
- Genre: Jazz
- Length: 39:32
- Label: Arista Novus
- Producer: Michael Cuscuna

Air chronology
Air Time (1977)	Open Air Suit (1978)	Montreux Suisse (1979)

Open Air Suit is an album by the improvisational collective Air, featuring Henry Threadgill, Steve McCall, and Fred Hopkins. It was recorded in New York in 1978 and contains four of Threadgill's compositions. It has not been reissued as an individual CD, but it was included in the 8-CD Complete Novus and Columbia Recordings of Henry Threadgill and Air issued by Mosaic Records.

== Reception ==
The AllMusic review by Scott Yanow states: "The music played by this talented trio is complex yet ultimately logical. The talented musicians seem to communicate instantly with each other and they consistently develop their music in the same direction on this stimulating set".

Professional ratings
Review scores
Source	Rating
AllMusic	2.5/5 stars

== Track listing ==
All compositions by Henry Threadgill

1. "Card Two: The Jick or Mandrill's Cosmic Ass" - 7:25
2. "Card Five: Open Air Suit" - 10:22
3. "Card Four: Strait White Royal Flush...78" - 6:15
4. "Card One: Cutten {2 Knuckles + 2 Widows + 2 Tricks}/3 X1" - 15:30

- Recorded at C.I. Recording Studios, New York City, on February 21 & 22, 1978

== Personnel ==
- Henry Threadgill - alto saxophone, tenor saxophone, baritone saxophone, flute
- Fred Hopkins - bass, maracas
- Steve McCall - drums, percussion
