= Ming (album) =

Studio album by David Murray Octet
- Released: 1980
- Recorded: July 25,28, 1980
- Genre: Jazz
- Length: 39:32
- Label: Black Saint

David Murray Octet chronology
Solo Live (1980)	Ming (1980)	Home (1981)

Ming is an album by David Murray, released in 1980 on the Italian Black Saint label and the first to feature his Octet. It features performances by Murray, Henry Threadgill, Olu Dara, Lawrence "Butch" Morris, George E. Lewis, Anthony Davis, Wilber Morris and Steve McCall.

== Reception ==
Professional ratings
Review scores
Source	Rating
AllMusic	5/5 stars
Robert Christgau	A
The Penguin Guide to Jazz	4/4 stars
The Rolling Stone Jazz Record Guide	5/5 stars
Tom Hull	A

The Penguin Guide to Jazz selected this album as part of its suggested Core Collection, writing that "for many fans, the jazz album of the 1980s was recorded before the decade was properly under way. Ming is an astonishing record, a virtual compression of three generations of improvised music into 40 minutes of entirely original jazz."

The Rolling Stone Jazz Record Guide said that "both Ming and Home display an excellent balance between written material and solos by a distinguished group of sidemen." Tom Hull said that Ming was "a startling album when it appeared, recalling Mingus both in its complex layering and its sheer energy, but pushing further as it gave vent to some of the most singular musicians of the '80s."

The AllMusic review by Scott Yanow stated: "His octet was always the perfect setting for tenor saxophonist David Murray, large enough to generate power but not as out of control as many of his big-band performances. Murray contributed all five originals (including 'Ming' and 'Dewey's Circle') and arrangements, and is in superior form on both tenor and bass clarinet. The 'backup crew' is also quite notable: altoist Henry Threadgill, trumpeter Olu Dara, cornetist Butch Morris, trombonist George Lewis, pianist Anthony Davis, bassist Wilbur Morris, and drummer Steve McCall. These avant-garde performances (reissued on CD) are often rhythmic enough to reach a slightly larger audience than usual, and the individuality shown by each of these major players is quite impressive. Recommended."

== Track listing ==
All compositions by David Murray

1. "The Fast Life" – 8:54
2. "The Hill" – 10:39
3. "Ming" – 4:28
4. "Jasvan" – 8:51
5. "Dewey's Circle" – 6:36
- Recorded at Right Track Recording Studios, NYC, July 25 & 28,1980

== Personnel ==
- David Murray – tenor saxophone, bass clarinet
- Henry Threadgill – alto saxophone
- Olu Dara – trumpet
- Lawrence "Butch" Morris – cornet
- George E. Lewis – trombone
- Anthony Davis – piano
- Wilber Morris – bass
- Steve McCall – drums
