= Air Raid (album) =

Studio album by Air
- Released: 1976
- Recorded: July 15, 1976
- Genre: Jazz
- Length: 42:51
- Label: Why Not
- Producer: Bob Cummins

Air chronology
Air Song (1975)	Air Raid (1976)	Live Air (1977)

Air Raid is the second album by the improvisational collective Air featuring Henry Threadgill, Steve McCall, and Fred Hopkins performing four of Threadgill's compositions. The album was originally released on the Japanese Why Not label in 1976 and later released in the U.S. on India Navigation in 1984.

== Reception ==
The Allmusic review by Thom Jurek stated: "The critical success of Air's debut album, Air Song, dictated both more of the same and a difference in approach over Air Raid... The concept of group improvisation was the same, but Henry Threadgill's compositional notions began to come through in his solos... Another fine effort".

Professional ratings
Review scores
Source	Rating
Allmusic	4/5 stars

== Track listing ==
All compositions by Henry Threadgill

1. "Air Raid" – 11:55
2. "Midnight Sun" – 7:05
3. "Release" – 16:31
4. "Through a Keyhole Darkly" – 7:20
- Recorded at Basement Studio, New York City on July 15, 1976

== Personnel ==
- Henry Threadgill – Chinese musette (track 1), alto saxophone (tracks 1 & 2), flute (track 3), hubkaphone (track 3), tenor saxophone (track 4)
- Fred Hopkins – bass
- Steve McCall – drums
