= Henry Threadgill =

American composer, saxophonist and flautist

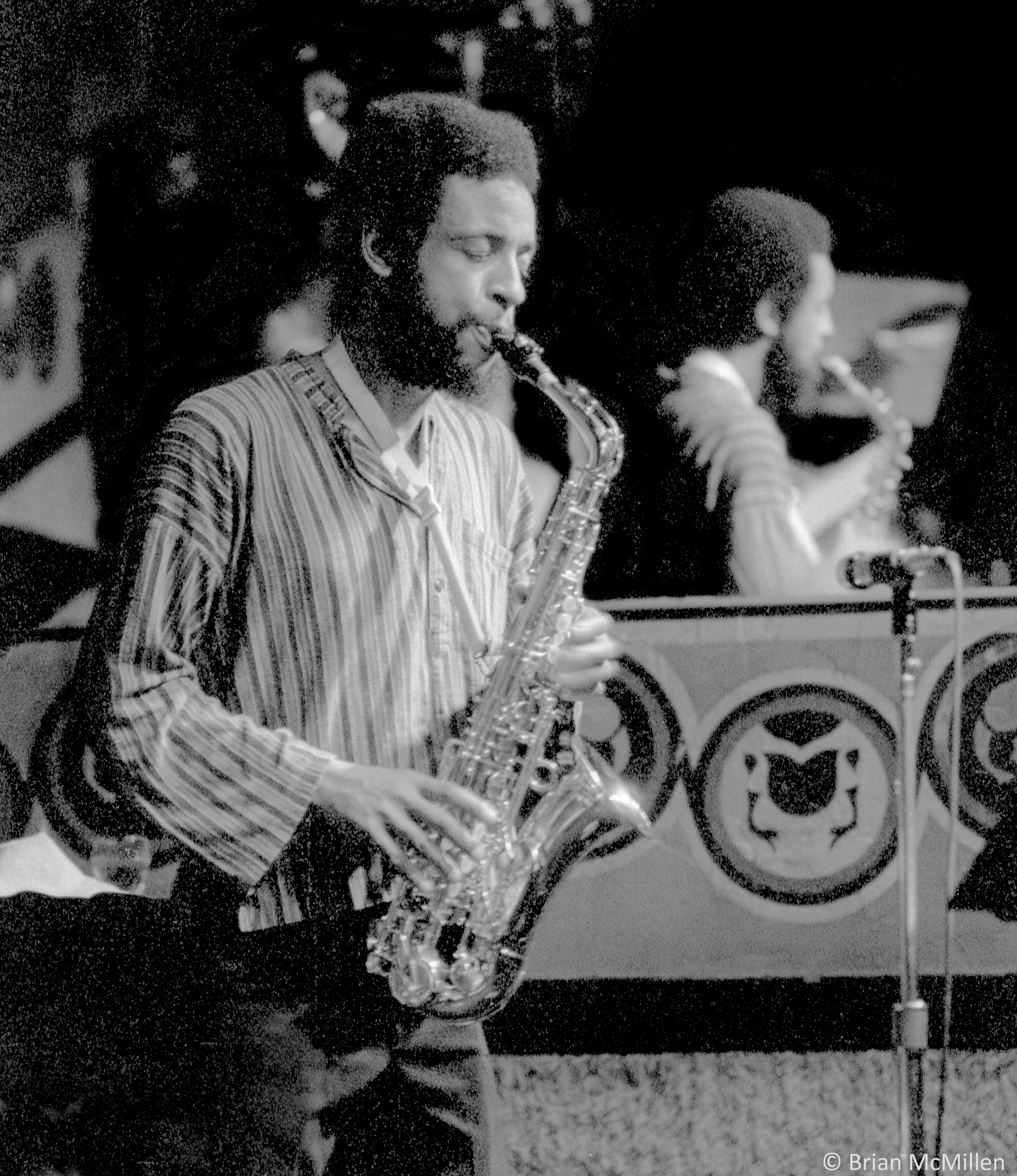
- Henry Threadgill at Keystone Korner, San Francisco, California, April 1979; with Air including Fred Hopkins and Steve McCall

Background information
- Born: Henry Luther Threadgill; February 15, 1944 (age 82); Chicago, Illinois, U.S.
- Genres: Jazz, avant-garde jazz, free jazz
- Occupations: Musician, composer
- Instruments: Saxophone, flute
- Years active: 1960s–present
- Labels: Arista/Novus, About Time, Black Saint, Columbia, Pi
- Website: www.henrythreadgill.com

Henry Threadgill (born February 15, 1944) is an American composer, saxophonist and flautist. He came to prominence in the 1970s leading ensembles rooted in jazz but with unusual instrumentation and often incorporating other genres of music. He has performed and recorded with several ensembles: Air, Aggregation Orb, Make a Move, the seven-piece Henry Threadgill Sextett, the twenty-piece Society Situation Dance Band, Very Very Circus, X-75, and Zooid.

He was awarded the 2016 Pulitzer Prize for Music for his album In for a Penny, In for a Pound, which premiered at Roulette Intermedium on December 4, 2014.

In 2023, he published his autobiography, written with Brent Hayes Edwards: Easily Slip into Another World: A Life in Music. The book was a New York Times Notable Book of the Year, along with being a Best Book of the Year: The New York Times, NPR, The New Yorker.

== Career ==
Threadgill performed as a percussionist in his high-school marching band before taking up baritone saxophone, alto saxophone, and flute. He studied at the American Conservatory of Music in Chicago, majoring in piano, flute, and composition. He studied piano with Gail Quillman and composition with Stella Roberts. He was an original member of the Experimental Band, a precursor to the Association for the Advancement of Creative Musicians (AACM) in his hometown of Chicago, and worked under the guidance of Muhal Richard Abrams, before leaving to tour with a gospel band. In 1967, he enlisted in the U.S. Army, playing with a rock band in Vietnam during the Vietnam War in 1967 and 1968. He was discharged in 1969.

After returning to Chicago, Threadgill joined AACM members bassist Fred Hopkins and drummer Steve McCall in a trio which would eventually become the group Air. He moved to New York City, where he formed his first group, X-75, a nonet consisting of four reed players, four bass players, and a vocalist.

In the early 1980s, Threadgill created his first critically acclaimed ensemble as a leader, the Henry Threadgill Sextet (actually a septet; he counted the two drummers as a single percussion unit), which released three albums on About Time Records. After a hiatus, he formed New Air with Pheeroan akLaff, replacing Steve McCall on drums, and reformed the Henry Threadgill Sextett (with two t's at the end). The six albums the group recorded feature some of his most accessible work, notably on the album You Know the Number. The group's unorthodox instrumentation included two drummers, double bass, cello, trumpet, and trombone, in addition to Threadgill's alto saxophone and flute. Among the players were drummers akLaff, John Betsch, Reggie Nicholson and Newman Baker; bassist Fred Hopkins; cellist Diedre Murray; trumpeters Rasul Siddik and Ted Daniels; cornetist Olu Dara; and trombonists Ray Anderson, Frank Lacy, Bill Lowe, and Craig Harris.

During the 1990s, Threadgill pushed the musical boundaries even further with his ensemble Very Very Circus. The group consisted of two tubas, two electric guitars, a trombone or French horn, and drums. With this group he explored more complex and highly structured forms of composition, augmenting the group with Latin percussion, French horn, violin, accordion, vocalists, and exotic instruments. He composed and recorded with other unusual instruments, such as a flute quartet (Flute Force Four, a one-time project from 1990); and combinations of four cellos and four acoustic guitars (on Makin' a Move).

He was signed by Columbia Records for three albums. Since the dissolution of Very Very Circus, Threadgill has continued in his iconoclastic ways with ensembles such as Make a Move and Zooid. Zooid, currently a sextet with tuba (Jose Davila), acoustic guitar (Liberty Ellman), cello (Christopher Hoffman), drums (Elliot Kavee) and bass guitar (Stomu Takeishi), has been the primary vehicle for Threadgill's compositions in the 2000s.

In 2018, Threadgill composed the string quartet "Sixfivetwo" for the Kronos Quartet, which they recorded as part of their "Fifty for the Future" project.

== Awards and honors ==
In 2016, Threadgill's composition In for a Penny, In for a Pound was awarded the Pulitzer Prize for Music.

In July 2016, he received the Vietnam Veterans of America Excellence in the Arts Award, at the VVA National Leadership Conference in Tucson.

"Run Silent, Run Deep, Run Loud, Run High" (conducted by Hale Smith) and "Mix for Orchestra" (conducted by Dennis Russell Davies), were both premiered at the Brooklyn Academy of Music in 1987 and 1993 respectively. He has had commissions from Mordine & Company in 1971 and 1989, from Carnegie Hall for "Quintet for Strings and Woodwinds" in 1983 and 1985, the New York Shakespeare Festival in 1985, Bang on a Can All-Stars in 1995, "Peroxide" commissioned by the Miller Theatre Columbia University in 2003 for "Aggregation Orb", a commission from the Talujon Percussion Ensemble in 2008, a piece "Fly Fliegen Volar" commissioned and premiered at the Saalfelden Jazz Festival with the Junge Philharmonie Salzburg Orchestra in 2007, a premier of the piece "Mc Guffins" with Zooid at the Biennale Festival in Italy in 2004.

In May 2020 he was presented with an honorary doctor of music by the University of Pennsylvania.

In October 2020, the National Endowment for the Arts (NEA) announced Threadgill as one of four recipients of the NEA Jazz Masters Fellowships, celebrated in an online concert and show on April 22, 2021. Awarded in recognition of lifetime achievement, the honor is bestowed on individuals who have made significant contributions to the art form. The other 2021 recipients were Terri Lyne Carrington, Albert "Tootie" Heath, and Phil Schaap.

In 2024 he received a PEN Oakland – Josephine Miles Award and an American Book Award for Easily Slip Into Another World: A Life in Music, coauthored with Brent Hayes Edwards.

== Personal life ==
Threadgill was born in Chicago. He studied piano, flute, and composition at the American Conservatory of Music in Chicago, and Governors State University, in University Park, Illinois. He was a member of the US Army Concert Band, and served in Vietnam. He is married to recording artist and ethnomusicologist Senti Toy, also known as Sentienla Toy Threadgill.

== Discography ==
=== As leader/co-leader ===
Air

- 1975: Air Song (Why Not)
- 1976: Air Raid (Why Not)
- 1977: Live Air (Black Saint)
- 1977: Air Time (Nessa)
- 1978: Open Air Suit (Arista/Novus)
- 1978: Montreux Suisse (Arista/Novus)
- 1979: Air Lore (Arista/Novus)
- 1980: Air Mail (Black Saint)
- 1982: 80° Below '82 (Antilles)
- 1983: Live at Montreal International Jazz Festival (as New Air) (Black Saint)
- 1986: Air Show No. 1 (as New Air with Cassandra Wilson) (Black Saint)

Other Bands

- 1979.01 – X-75 Volume 1 – Arista/Novus (1979) (Henry Threadgill: Douglas Ewart, Joseph Jarman, Wallace McMillan, Ken Whitehead, Donald Cooke, Fred Hopkins, Jeanne Lee) (nd – nd)
- 1981.11 – When Was That? – About Time (1982) (Henry Threadgill Sextet: Olu Dara, Craig Harris, Ken McIntyre, Fred Hopkins, Brian Smith, Pheeroan akLaff) (nd – nd)
- 1983.03 – Just the Facts and Pass the Bucket – About Time (1983) (Henry Threadgill Sextet: Olu Dara, Craig Harris, Ken McIntyre, Fred Hopkins, Brian Smith, Pheeroan akLaff) (nd – nd)
- 1984.12 – Subject to Change – About Time (1985) (Henry Threadgill Sextet: Olu Dara, Craig Harris, Ken McIntyre, Diedre Murray, Fred Hopkins, John Betsch, Pheeroan akLaff) (nd – nd)
- 1986.10 – You Know the Number – Arista/Novus (1987) (Henry Threadgill Sextet: Rasul Siddik, Frank Lacy, Diedre Murray, Fred Hopkins, Reggie Nicholson, Pheeroan akLaff) (nd – nd)
- 1987.09 – Easily Slip Into Another World– Arista/Novus (1988) (Henry Threadgill Sextet: Rasul Siddik, Frank Lacy, Diedre Murray, Fred Hopkins, Reggie Nicholson, Pheeroan akLaff, Aisha Putli) (nd – nd)
- 1988.03 – Live in Hamburg – Shanghai Records (1991) (Society Situation Dance Band: Ted Daniel, Kamau Adilifu, Olu Dara, Franck Lacy, Ray Anderson, Clifton Anderson, Graham Haynes, Arthur Blythe, Oliver Lake, Byard Lancaster, Charles Brackeen, Frank Wright, Cheryl Byron) (nd – nd)
- 1988.12 – Rag, Bush and All – Arista/Novus (1989) (Henry Threadgill Sextet: Ted Daniel, Frank Lacy, Diedre Murray, Fred Hopkins, Reggie Nicholson, Newman Baker) (nd – nd)
- 1990.11 – Spirit of Nuff...Nuff – Black Saint (1991) (Very Very Circus: Curtis Fowlkes, Brandon Ross, Masujaa, Marcus Rojas, Edwin Rodriguez, Gene Lake) (nd – nd)
- 1991.05 – Live at Koncepts – Taylor Made (1992) (Very Very Circus: Mark Taylor, Brandon Ross, Masujaa, Marcus Rojas, Edwin Rodriguez, Gene Lake) (nd – nd)
- 1993.01 – Too Much Sugar for a Dime - Axiom (1993) (Very Very Circus: Mark Taylor, Brandon Ross, Masujaa, Marcus Rojas, Edwin Rodriguez, Gene Lake) (nd – nd)
- 1993.08 – Song Out of My Trees – Black Saint (1994) ( Ted Daniel, Brandon Ross, Ed Cherry, Myra Melford, Diedre Murray, Fred Hopkins, Jerome Harris) (nd – nd)
- 1994.03 – Carry the Day - Columbia (1995) (Very Very Circus: Mark Taylor, Brandon Ross, Ed Cherry, Marcus Rojas, Edwin Rodriguez, Gene Lake, Sentwali Sadiata) (nd – nd)
- 1995.03 – Makin' a Move – Columbia (1995) (Very Very Circus: Brandon Ross, Ed Cherry, Marcus Rojas, Edwin Rodriguez, Pheeroan akLaff, Amina Claudine Myers) (nd – nd)
- 1997.11 – Where's Your Cup? – Columbia (1998) (Make a Move: Brandon Ross, Tony Cedras, Stomu Takeishi, J.T. Lewis) (nd – nd)
- 2001.01 – Everybodys Mouth's a Book – Pi Recordings (2001) (Make a Move: Brandon Ross, Tony Cedras, Stomu Takeishi, Dafnis Prieto) (nd – nd)
- 2001.01 – Up Popped the Two Lips – Pi Recordings (2001) (Zooid: Liberty Ellman, Tarik Benbrahim, José Davila, Dana Leong, Dafnis Prieto) (nd – nd)
- 2004.12 – Pop Start the Tape, StoP – Hardedge (2005) (Zooid: Liberty Ellman, José Davila, Dana Leong, Elliot Humberto Kavee) (nd – nd)
- 2008.09 – This Brings Us to Volume 1 – Pi Recordings (2009) (Zooid: Liberty Ellman, José Davila, Stomu Takeishi, Elliot Humberto Kavee) (nd – nd)
- 2008.09 – This Brings Us to Volume 2 – Pi Recordings (2010) (Zooid: Liberty Ellman, José Davila, Stomu Takeishi, Elliot Humberto Kavee) (nd – nd)
- 2011.09 – Tomorrow Sunny / The Revelry, Spp – Pi Recordings (2012) (Zooid: Liberty Ellman, José Davila, Stomu Takeishi, Elliot Humberto Kavee, Christopher Hoffman) (nd – nd)
- 2014.12 – In for a Penny, In for a Pound – Pi Recordings (2015) (Zooid: Liberty Ellman, José Davila, Christopher Hoffman, Elliot Humberto Kavee) (nd – nd)
- 2015.01 – Old Locks and Irregular Verbs – Pi Recordings (2016) (Ensemble Double Up: Jason Moran, David Virelles, Curtis Macdonald, Roman Filiu, Christopher Hoffman, Jose Davila, Craig Weinrib) (nd – nd)
- 2017.05 – Dirt… And More Dirt t– Pi Recordings (2018) (14 or 15 Kestra: Agg: Curtis Macdonald, Roman Filiu, Christopher Hoffman, José Davila, Ben Gerstein, Jacob Garchik, Thomas Morgan, Craig Weinrib, Liberty Ellman, David Virelles) (nd – nd)
- 2017.05 – Double Up, Plays Double Up Plus– Pi Recordings (2018) (Ensemble Double Up: Curtis Macdonald, Roman Filiu, Christopher Hoffman, José Davila, David Virelles, Luis Perdomo, Craig Weinrib, Thomas Morgan) (nd – nd)
- 2019.12 – Poof – Pi Recordings (2021) (Zooid: Liberty Ellman, José Davila, Christopher Hoffman, Elliot Humberto Kavee) (nd – nd)
- 2022.05 – The Other One – Pi Recordings (2023) (Henry Threadgill Ensemble: Alfredo Colon, Noah Becker, Peyton Pleninger, Craig Weinrib, Sara Caswell, Stephanie Griffin, Christopher Hoffman, Jose Davila) (nd – nd)

=== As sideman ===
With Muhal Richard Abrams

- Young at Heart/Wise in Time (1969)
- 1-OQA+19 (1977)

With Anthony Braxton

- For Trio (Arista, 1978)

With Chico Freeman

- Morning Prayer (Whynot, 1976)

With Roscoe Mitchell

- Nonaah (Nessa, 1977)
- L-R-G / The Maze / S II Examples (Nessa, 1978)

With Frank Walton

- Reality (1978)

With David Murray

- Ming (1980)
- Home (1981)
- Murray's Steps (1982)

With Material / Bill Laswell

- Memory Serves (1981)
- The Third Power (1991)

With Sly & Robbie / Bill Laswell

- Rhythm Killers (1987)

With Carlinhos Brown / Bill Laswell

- Bahia Black: Ritual Beating System (1991)

With Leroy Jenkins

- Themes & Improvisations on the Blues (1992)

With Kip Hanrahan

- Darn It! (1992) with Paul Haines
- A Thousand Nights and a Night (Shadow Night – 1) (1996)

With Billy Bang

- Hip Hop Be Bop (1993) with Craig Harris
- Vietnam: Reflections (2005)

With Sola

- Blues in the East (1994)

With Abiodun Oyewole

- 25 Years (1996)

With Flute Force Four (Threadgill, Pedro Eustache, Melecio Magdaluyo, James Newton)

- Flutistry (1990, released 1997)

With Douglas Ewart

- Angles of Entrance (1998)

With Jean-Paul Bourelly

- Boom Bop (2000)
- Trance Atlantic – Boom Bop II (2001)

With Ejigayehu "Gigi" Shibabaw

- Gigi (2001)

With Lucky Peterson

- Black Midnight Sun (2002)

With Dafnis Prieto

- Absolute Quintet (2006)

With Wadada Leo Smith

- The Great Lakes Suites (2012, released 2014)
- The Chicago Symphonies (2021)

With Jack DeJohnette

- Made in Chicago (ECM, 2013 [2015]) with Muhal Richard Abrams, Larry Gray and Roscoe Mitchell
