= Expandable Language =

Studio album by Oliver Lake
- Released: 1984
- Recorded: September 17 & 20, 1984
- Genre: Jazz
- Length: 37:10
- Label: Black Saint
- Producer: Giovanni Bonandrini

Oliver Lake chronology
Plug It (1982)	Expandable Language (1984)	Dancevision (1986)

Expandable Language is an album by American jazz saxophonist Oliver Lake, recorded in 1984 for the Italian Black Saint label.

== Reception ==
The AllMusic review by Scott Yanow stated, "This free bop session (which is often quite free but often has a strong pulse) is one of altoist Oliver Lake's more rewarding sessions".

Professional ratings
Review scores
Source	Rating
AllMusic	4.5/5 stars
The Penguin Guide to Jazz Recordings	3.5/4 stars

== Track listing ==
All compositions by Oliver Lake

1. "Expandable Language" – 7:48
2. "Comous" – 5:20
3. "N.S." – 5:50
4. "Page Four" – 5:20
5. "Soons" – 7:23
6. "Everybody Knows That" – 5:29

Recorded at Vanguard Studios in New York City on September 17 and 20, 1984.

== Personnel ==
- Oliver Lake – alto saxophone, soprano saxophone, flute
- Kevin Eubanks – guitar
- Geri Allen – piano
- Fred Hopkins – bass
- Pheeroan akLaff – drums
