= Subject to Change (Henry Threadgill album) =

Studio album by Henry Threadgill
- Released: 1985
- Recorded: December 7–9, 1984
- Genre: Jazz
- Label: About Time

Henry Threadgill chronology
Just the Facts and Pass the Bucket (1983)	Subject to Change (1985)	You Know the Number (1986)

Professional ratings
Review scores
Source	Rating
AllMusic	4/5 stars

Subject to Change is an album by Henry Threadgill released on the About Time label in 1985. The album features six of Threadgill's compositions performed by Threadgill with Ray Anderson, Rasul Siddik, Fred Hopkins, Diedre Murray, Pheeroan akLaff and John Betsch with Amina Claudine Myers contributing vocals to one track.

The AllMusic review by Brian Olewnick states, "Subject to Change continued to display the leader's extraordinary compositional gifts in a series of pieces ranging from the episodic to the melancholy to the purely grooving... meaty, imaginative, solidly and even inspiringly played, and rich in evocations of past musics while looking straight into the future".

== Track listing ==
All compositions by Henry Threadgill

1. "Just Trinity the Man" - 7:01
2. "Homeostasis" (words by Emilio Cruz) - 4:32
3. "Higher Places - 7:34
4. "Subject to Change" - 10:53
5. "This" - 5:29
6. "A Piece of Software" (lyrics by Cassandra Wilson) - 5:29

Recorded at Right Track Studios, New York City on December 7–9, 1984

== Personnel ==
- Henry Threadgill - alto saxophone, tenor saxophone, clarinet, flute
- Ray Anderson - trombone
- Rasul Siddik - cornet
- Diedre Murray - cello
- Fred Hopkins - bass
- John Betsch - percussion
- Pheeroan akLaff - percussion, recitation (track 2)
- Amina Claudine Myers - vocal (track 6)
