= Live Air =

Live album by Air
- Released: 1980
- Recorded: July 1, 1976 & October 28, 1977
- Genre: Jazz
- Length: 39:53
- Label: Black Saint
- Producer: Giovanni Bonandrini

Air chronology
Air Raid (1976)	Live Air (1980)	Air Time (1977)

Live Air is a live album by the improvisational collective Air featuring Henry Threadgill, Steve McCall, and Fred Hopkins recorded at Studio Rivbea, in New York and the University of Michigan in Ann Arbor, first released by Black Saint Records in 1980.

== Reception ==
The Penguin Guide to Jazz selected this album as part of its suggested Core Collection.

According to the Allmusic review by Brian Olewnick, "Live Air is a must for any fan of this wonderful trio".

Professional ratings
Review scores
Source	Rating
Penguin Guide to Jazz	3/4 stars
Allmusic	4/5 stars
The Rolling Stone Jazz Record Guide	4/5 stars

== Track listing ==
All compositions by Henry Threadgill

1. "Eulogy for Charles Clarke" - 10:37
2. "Portrait of Leo Smith" - 8:06
3. "Keep Right on Playing Thru the Mirror over the Water" - 15:30
4. "Be Ever Out" - 5:40

- Recorded at Studio Rivbea, New York on July 1, 1976 (tracks 1 & 2) and University of Michigan, Ann Arbor, Michigan on October 28, 1977 (tracks 3 & 4)

== Personnel ==
- Henry Threadgill - alto saxophone, flute, percussion
- Fred Hopkins - bass
- Steve McCall - drums, percussion
