= Pheeroan akLaff =

American jazz drummer (born 1955)

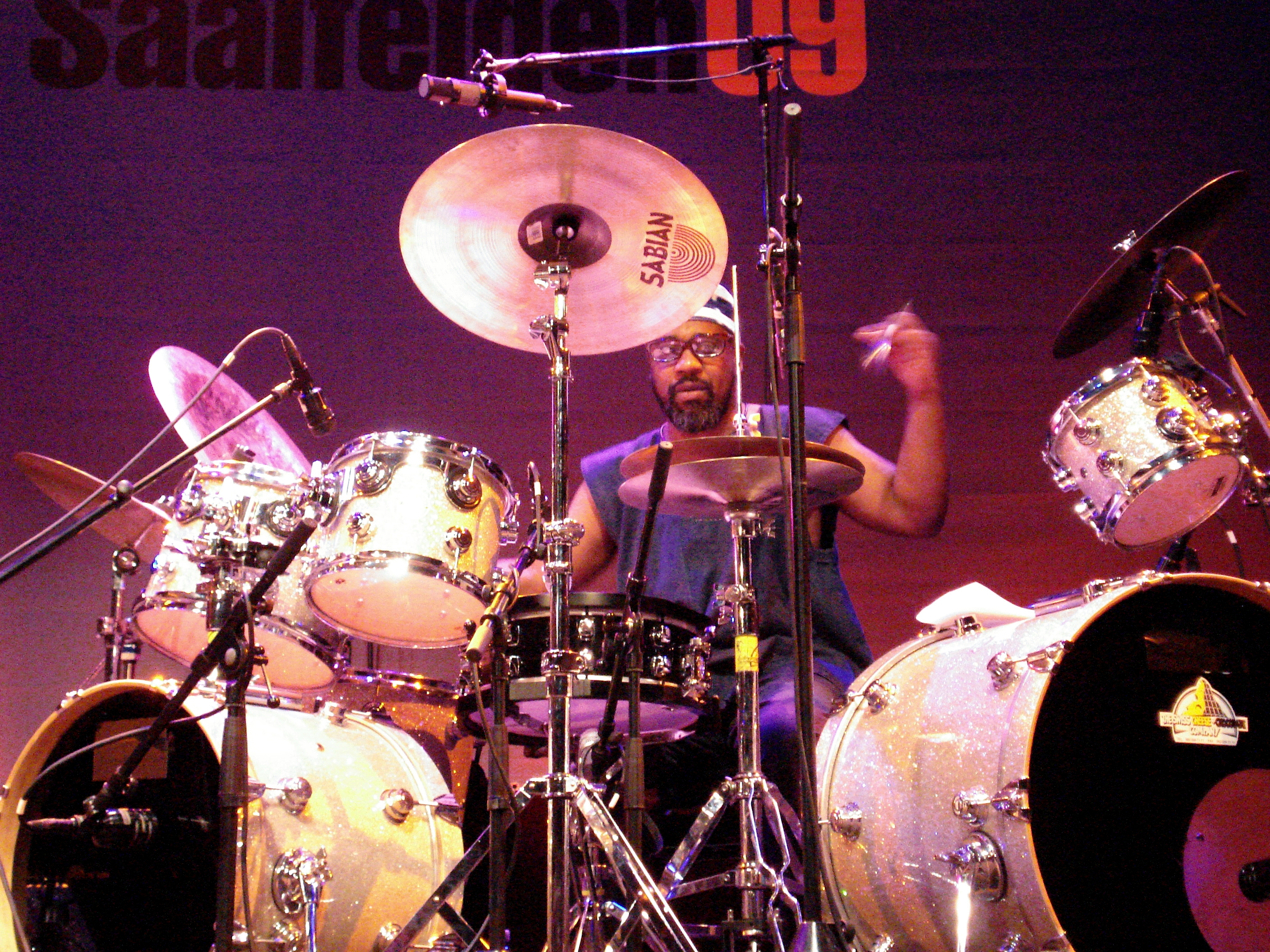
- Pheeroan akLaff with the Oliver Lake Trio, Saalfelden, Austria, 2009

Background information
- Born: January 27, 1955 (age 71)
- Genres: Jazz
- Occupation: Musician
- Instruments: Drums, percussion
- Website: www.pheeroanaklaff.com

Pheeroan akLaff (born Paul Maddox; January 27, 1955) is an American jazz drummer and percussionist. He began playing in his hometown of Detroit, Michigan and Ann Arbor, with R & B keyboardist Travis Biggs, funk keyboardist Nimrod “The Grinder” Lumpkin, The Ebony Set and The Last Days. He moved to New Haven, Connecticut, and formed a group with saxophonist/flautist/percussionist Dwight Andrews. He debuted with saxophonist Bill Barron in 1975, followed by a tenure in Leo Smith's ‘New Dalta Ahkri’ (1977–1979).

akLaff developed a longstanding association with saxophonist and poet Oliver Lake starting in 1975, which included writing for their fusion ensemble, ‘Jump Up’. He recorded with Lake on and off from 1980–1992. His extensive work as a session musician includes collaborations with prominent jazz musicians Geri Allen, Andrew Hill, Cecil Taylor, Anthony Braxton, Don Byron, Julius Hemphill, Henry Threadgill, Mal Waldron, Sonny Sharrock, Anthony Davis and Reggie Workman. In 2006 he co-founded Seed Artists in Brooklyn. In 2009, he reestablished his creative partnership with Wadada Leo Smith after thirty years, and has recorded with him since, including Ten Freedom Summers, a finalist for the Pulitzer Prize for Music in 2013. akLaff currently teaches music at Wesleyan University.

== Discography ==
=== As leader ===
- 1980: House of Spirit: Mirth (Passin’ Thru Records)
- 1983: Fits Like a Glove (Gramavision)
- 1989: Sonogram (Mu Works)
- 1998: Global Mantras (Modern Masters)

=== As sideman ===
With Geri Allen

- Maroons (Blue Note, 1992)

With Anthony Braxton

- Anthony Braxton's Charlie Parker Project 1993 (HatART, 1993, [1995])
- Knitting Factory (Piano/Quartet) 1994, Vol. 1 (Leo, 1994)
- Knitting Factory (Piano/Quartet) 1994, Vol. 2 (Leo, 1994)
- Seven Standards 1995 (Knitting Factory Works, 1995)

With Oliver Lake

- Holding Together (Black Saint, 1975) [as Paul Maddox]
- Prophet (Black Saint, 1980)
- Clevont Fitzhubert (Black Saint, 1981)
- Expandable Language (Black Saint, 1984)
- Again and Again (Gramavision, 1991)
- Zaki (hat ART, 1992)
- Virtual Reality (Total Escapism) (Gazell, 1992)

With Henry Threadgill

- When Was That? (1982)
- Just the Facts and Pass the Bucket (1983)
- New Air: Live at Montreal International Jazz Festival (1984)
- Subject to Change (1985)
- New Air: Air Show No. 1 (1986) with Cassandra Wilson
- You Know the Number (1986)
- Easily Slip Into Another World (1987)
- Makin' a Move (1995)

With Jay Hoggard

- The Right Place (JHVM, 2003)
- Something 'Bout Believing (Twinz Records, 1999)
- Love Is the Answer (Muse, 1994)
- Riverside Dance (India Navigation), 1985
- Love Survives (Gramavision, 1983)

With Craig Harris

- Shelter (JMT 1987)
- Blackout in the Square Root of Soul (JMT, 1988)

With Ray Anderson

- What Because (Gramavision, 1989)

With Don Byron

- Tuskegee Experiments (1992)
- Bug Music (1996)

With Baikida Carroll

- Shadows and Reflections (Soul Note, 1982)
- Door of the Cage (Soul Note, 1995)
- Marionettes on a High Wire (OmniTone, 2001)

With Anthony Davis

- Hidden Voices (India Navigation, 1979) – with James Newton
- Variations in Dream-time (India Navigation, 1980)
- Episteme (Gramavision, 1981)
- Hemispheres (Gramavision, 1983)

With Julius Hemphill

- One Atmosphere (2003)

With Uwe Kropinski

- First Time in Manhattan (ITM, 1993)

With Roscoe Mitchell

- Sketches from Bamboo (Moers Music, 1979)

With Amina Claudine Myers

- Song for Mother E (Leo Records, 1979)

With Sonny Sharrock

- Seize the Rainbow (Enemy, 1987)
- Live in New York (Enemy, 1989)

With Wadada Leo Smith

- Song of Humanity (Kabell, 1977) also released on Kabell Years: 1971–1979 (Tzadik, 2004)
- Budding of a Rose (Moers Music, 1979)
- Spirit Catcher (Nessa, 1979)
- Spiritual Dimensions (Cuneiform, 2009)
- Dark Lady of the Sonnets (TUM, 2011)
- Heart's Reflections (Cuneiform, 2011)
- Ten Freedom Summers (Cuneiform, 2012)
- America's National Parks (Cuneiform, 2016)
- Najwa (TUM, 2017)

With Mal Waldron

- My Dear Family (Evidence, 1993)

With Reggie Workman

- Summit Conference (Postcards, 1993)

With Yōsuke Yamashita

- Kurdish Dance (Verve, 1993)
- Dazzling Days (Verve, 1993)
- Fragments 1999 (Verve, 1999)
- Spider (Verve, 1996)
