= Whynot Records =

Japanese jazz record label

Whynot Records was a Japanese jazz record label. Several albums of their discography were also released on India Navigation.

== Discography ==
Catalog #	Leader	Album	Year
001 / 7118	Walt Dickerson	Tell Us Only the Beautiful Things	1975
002 / 7119	George Cables	Why Not	1975
003 / 7120	Air	Air Song	1975
004 / 7121	Muhal Richard Abrams	Afrisong	1975
005 / 7122	Joe Bonner, Clint Houston, Billy Hart	Triangle	1975
006 / 7123	Monty Waters	The Black Cat	1975
007 / 7150	Fumio Karashima	Piranha	1975
008 / 7151	Joe Lee Wilson	Shout For Trane	1976
009 / 7152	Charles Sullivan	Re-Entry	1976
010 / 7153	Ted Curson	Blue Piccolo	1976
011 / 7154	Donald Smith, Cecil McBee, Jack DeJohnette	LUV	1976
012 / 7155	Chico Freeman	Morning Prayer	1976
013 / 7156	Air	Air Raid	1976
014 / 7157	Andrew Cyrille	Junction	1976
015 / 7158	Teruhiko Kataoka	Love Walking	1977
016 / 7159	Fumio Karashima	Landscape	1977
MTCJ 2009	Walt Dickerson	Walt Dickerson 1976	1976
PAP 25032	Kenny Barron	Imo Live	1982
