= Olu Dara =

American cornetist, guitarist, and singer (born 1941)

- Born: Charles Jones III; January 12, 1941 (age 85); Natchez, Mississippi, U.S.
- Origin: Natchez, Mississippi, U.S.
- Genre: Jazz
- Occupations: Musician; songwriter
- Instruments: Vocals, guitar, cornet, trumpet, harmonica, drums, percussion
- Years active: 1964–present
- Label: Atlantic Records

Olu Dara Jones (born Charles Jones III; January 12, 1941) is an American cornetist, guitarist, and singer. He is the father of rapper Nas.

== Early life ==
Olu Dara was born Charles Jones III on January 12, 1941, in Natchez, Mississippi. His mother, Ella Mae Jones, was born in Canton, Mississippi. His father, Charlie R. Jones, born in Natchez, was a traveling musician, and sang with The Melodiers, a vocal quartet with a guitarist.

As a child, Dara took piano and clarinet lessons. He studied at Tennessee State University, initially a pre-med major, switching to music theory and composition.

== Career ==
From 1959 to 1964 he was a musician in the Navy, which he described as a priceless educational experience.

In 1964, he moved to New York City and changed his name to Olu Dara, which means "The Lord is good" in the Yoruba language. In the 1970s and 1980s he played alongside David Murray, Henry Threadgill, Hamiet Bluiett, Don Pullen, Charles Brackeen, James Blood Ulmer, and Cassandra Wilson. He formed two bands, the Okra Orchestra and the Natchezsippi Dance Band.

His first album, In the World: From Natchez to New York (1998), revealed another aspect of his musical personality: the leader and singer of a band immersed in African-American tradition, playing an eclectic mix of blues, jazz, and storytelling, with tinges of funk, African popular music, and reggae. His second album Neighborhoods, with guest appearances by Dr. John and Cassandra Wilson, followed in a similar vein.

Dara played on the album Illmatic (1994) by his son, rapper Nas, and on the song "Dance" (2002), also by Nas, and he sang on Nas's songs "Bridging the Gap" and "Street's Disciple" (2004).

== Discography ==
=== As leader ===
- In the World: From Natchez to New York (Atlantic, 1998)
- Neighborhoods (Atlantic, 2001)

With Material

- Memory Serves (1981)
- The Third Power (1991)

=== As sideman ===
With Charles Brackeen

- 1987 Attainment (Silkheart)
- 1987 Worshippers Come Nigh (Silkheart)

With Rhys Chatham

- 1984 Factor X
- 1987 Die Donnergötter (The Thundergods)

With Carlos Garnett

- 1975 Let This Melody Ring On (Muse)
- 1977 Fire

With Corey Harris

- 2002 Downhome Sophisticate
- 2005 Daily Bread

With Craig Harris

- 1985 Tributes (OTC)
- 1999 Cold Sweat Plays J. B. (JMT)

With David Murray

- Flowers for Albert: The Complete Concert (India Navigation, 1976)
- Ming (Black Saint, 1980)
- Home (Black Saint, 1981)
- Live at Sweet Basil Volume 1 (Black Saint, 1984)
- Live at Sweet Basil Volume 2 (Black Saint, 1984)
- The Tip (DIW, 1995)
- Jug-A-Lug (DIW, 1995)

With Nas

- 1994 Illmatic
- 2002 God's Son
- 2004 Bridging the Gap
- 2004 Street's Disciple

With Jamaaladeen Tacuma

- 1983 Show Stopper
- 1984 Renaissance Man

With Henry Threadgill

- 1982 When Was That?
- 1983 Just the Facts and Pass the Bucket

With James Blood Ulmer

- Are You Glad to Be in America? (1980)
- Free Lancing (1981)
- No Escape from the Blues: The Electric Lady Sessions (2003)

With Cassandra Wilson

- 1987 Days Aweigh (JMT)
- 1993 Blue Light 'Til Dawn
- 1999 Traveling Miles
- 2002 Belly of the Sun

With others

- 1970 Journey to Air, Terumasa Hino
- 1970 Who Knows What Tomorrow's Gonna Bring?, Jack McDuff
- 1973 Ethnic Expressions, Roy Brooks
- 1973 Revelation, Doug Carn
- 1975 Heavy Spirits, Oliver Lake
- 1977 Endangered Species, Hamiet Bluiett
- 1978 Live at Moers Festival, Phillip Wilson
- 1980 Flat-Out Jump Suite, Julius Hemphill
- 1982 Flying Out, Cecil McBee
- 1982 Nots, Elliott Sharp
- 1983 Nona, Nona Hendryx
- 1984 "Conjure - Music For The Texts Of Ishmael Reed", Conjure
- 1985 The African Flower, James Newton
- 1985 The Sixth Sense, Don Pullen
- 1993 Deconstruction: The Celluloid Recordings, Bill Laswell
- 1997 KC After Dark, Kansas City Band
- 1998 Empire Box, Tim Berne
- 1998 You Don't Know My Mind, Guy Davis
- 2002 Medicated Magic, Dirty Dozen Brass Band
- 2002 Trance Atlantic (Boom Bop II), Jean-Paul Bourelly
- 2003 Chinatown, The Be Good Tanyas
- 2007 The Harlem Experiment, The Harlem Experiment
- 2007 This Is Where You Wanna Be, The Brawner Brothers
- 2021 The Boyé Multi-National Crusade for Harmony, Julius Hemphill
