= Michael Gregory (guitarist) =

American jazz musician (born 1953)

- Born: Michael Gregory Jackson; August 28, 1953 (age 73); New Haven, Connecticut, U.S.
- Genres: Jazz; R&B; avant-garde; rock; blues; free jazz
- Occupations: Musician; composer
- Instrument: Guitar
- Years active: 1970s–present
- Labels: Bija; Improvising Artists; Arista Novus; Enja; Island; Tiptoe; Golden; Ethnicity Against the Error
- Member of: Clarity Quartet; Clarity TRiO
- Website: www.michaelgregoryjackson.com

Michael Gregory Jackson (born August 28, 1953, in New Haven, Connecticut) is an American guitarist and composer working in jazz, R&B, avant-garde, rock, blues, and free jazz. Early in his career, he used his given name, Michael Gregory Jackson. In 1983, when he signed with Island Records, he dropped Jackson and recorded under Michael Gregory to prevent mix-ups with the name of pop singer Michael Jackson. In 2013, he returned to using his full name Michael Gregory Jackson.

Jackson spent the 1970s in western Massachusetts, earning praise from critics and free-jazz followers for his first two solo albums. During the 1970s and '80s, he worked with avant-garde jazz musicians Oliver Lake, Marion Brown and Baikida Carroll.

He worked with playwright Ntozake Shange, poet Jessica Hagedorn, and poet Thulani Davis at the Public Theater, New York City. Following this, he began working more in rock, jazz fusion, and R&B. He worked with Walter Becker of Steely Dan. In 1983, Nile Rodgers produced his album Situation-X for Island Records.

In 2013, he formed Michael Gregory Jackson's Clarity Quartet and Michael Gregory Jackson's Clarity TRiO. His groups have included Anthony Davis, Bob Moses, David Murray, Jerome Harris, Julius Hemphill, Mark Helias, Mark Trayle, Marty Ehrlich, Wadada Leo Smith, and Will Calhoun.

== Discography ==
=== As leader ===
- Clarity (Bija, 1977)
- Karmonic Suite (Improvising Artists, 1978)
- Gifts (Arista Novus, 1979)
- Heart & Center (Arista Novus, 1979)
- Cowboys, Cartoons & Assorted Candy (Enja, 1982)
- Situation X (Island, 1983)
- What to Where (RCA Novus, 1988)
- The Way We Used to Do (Tiptoe, 1990)
- Red (Golden, 1998)
- Towards the Sun (Golden, 2002)
- After Before (Golden, 2015)
- Endogeny & Exogamy (Ethnicity Against the Error, 2015)
- Spirit Signal Strata (Golden, 2017)
- Whenufindituwillknow (Golden, 2019)

=== As sideman ===
With Oliver Lake

- Holding Together (Black Saint, 1976)
- Life Dance of Is (Arista Novus, 1978)
- Shine! (Arista Novus, 1979)
- Plug It (Gramavision, 1983)
- Zaki (hat ART, 1992)

With Wadada Leo Smith

- Spiritual Dimensions (Cuneiform, 2009)
- Heart's Reflections (Cuneiform, 2011)
- Najwa (TUM, 2017)

With others

- Pheeroan akLaff, Fits Like a Glove (Gramavision, 1983)
- Deanna Bogart, New Address (Viceroots, 1996)
- Matthew Shipp, Matthew Shipp Plays the Music of Allen Lowe (Constant Sorrow, 2015)
