= In Our Style =

1986 studio album by David Murray & Jack DeJohnette

Studio album by David Murray & Jack DeJohnette
- Released: 1986
- Recorded: September 3–4, 1986
- Genre: Jazz
- Length: 43:36
- Label: DIW
- Producer: Kazunori Sugiyama

David Murray chronology
I Want to Talk About You (1986)	In Our Style (1986)	The Hill (1986)

Jack DeJohnette chronology
The Jack DeJohnette Piano Album (1985)	In Our Style (1986)	Irresistible Forces (1987)

In Our Style is an album by David Murray and Jack DeJohnette, released on the Japanese DIW label in 1986. It features five duo performances by Murray and DeJohnette, with Fred Hopkins joining on two additional numbers.

== Reception ==
Professional ratings
Review scores
Source	Rating
AllMusic	4/5 stars

AllMusic's Scott Yanow wrote that "David Murray, doubling on tenor and bass clarinet, interacts with drummer Jack Dejohnette and (on two of the seven selections) bassist Fred Hopkins for a set of originals by Murray, DeJohnette and Butch Morris. The duo/trio explore a variety of moods with Murray's extroverted and advanced solos generally serving as the lead voice. Although an avant-garde set, this Japanese import has its mellow and melodic moments before the fire takes over again."

== Track listing ==
1. "In Your Style" (Morris) - 6:15
2. "Tin Can Alley" (DeJohnette) - 5:39
3. "Both Feet on the Ground" (Murray) - 5:09
4. "The Dice" (Morris) - 8:17
5. "Pastel Rhapsody" (DeJohnette) - 6:39
6. "Great Peace" (Murray) - 6:49
7. "Kalimba" (DeJohnette) - 5:37

== Personnel ==
- David Murray - tenor saxophone, bass clarinet
- Jack DeJohnette - drums, piano
- Fred Hopkins - bass (tracks 1 & 4)
