= Novus Records =

American record label

- Parent company: Arista Records
- Founded: 1978
- Founder: Clive Davis
- Status: Defunct
- Genre: Jazz
- Country of origin: U.S.

Novus Records (later Arista Novus and RCA Novus) was an American jazz record label run by Steve Backer. Backer worked at Impulse! Records until 1974, when Clive Davis, founder of Arista Records, asked him to oversee the jazz division at Arista.

Backer left Arista in the early 1980s, worked for Windham Hill Records, and then went to RCA to run Novus. Novus's roster included Muhal Richard Abrams, Warren Bernhardt, Steve Coleman, Larry Coryell, Oliver Lake, Steve Lacy, James Moody, Hilton Ruiz, and Henry Threadgill. Beginning in 1989, Backer signed Marcus Roberts, Roy Hargrove, Danilo Pérez, Antonio Hart, and Christopher Hollyday. The label closed in the mid-1990s. The catalogue is now managed by Sony Masterworks through its Masterworks Jazz imprint.

== Discography ==
=== 3000-N (RCA) series ===
- 3000: Muhal Richard Abrams – Lifea Blinec
- 3001: Warren Bernhardt – Solo Piano
- 3002: Air – Open Air Suit
- 3003: Oliver Lake – Life Dance of Is
- 3004: Baird Hersey – Looking for That Groove
- 3005: Larry Coryell – European Impressions
- 3006: Ran Blake – Rapport
- 3007: Muhal Richard Abrams – Spiral Live at Montreux 1978
- 3008: Air – Montreux Suisse
- 3009: Mike Mainieri & Warren Bernhardt – Free Smiles
- 3010: Oliver Lake – Shine
- 3011: Warren Bernhardt – Floating
- 3012: Michael Gregory – Gifts
- 3013: Henry Threadgill – X-75 Volume 1
- 3014: Air – Air Lore
- 3015: Michael Gregory – Heart and Center
- 3016: Baird Hersey – Have You Heard?
- 3017: Larry Coryell – Tributaries
- 3018: John Scofield – Who's Who?
- 3019: Ran Blake – Film Noir
- 3020: Warren Bernhardt – Manhattan Update
- 3021: Pharoah Sanders & Norman Connors – Beyond a Dream
- 3022: John Scofield – Bar Talk
- 3023: Steve Khan – Evidence
- 3024: Larry Coryell – Standing Ovation
- 3025: Henry Threadgill – Easily Slip Into Another World
- 3032: Michael Shrieve & Steve Roach – The Leaving Time
- 3037: Liz Story – Speechless
- 3051: Marcus Roberts – The Truth is Spoken Here
- 3054: Chet Baker – Let's Get Lost
- 3070: Hugh Masekela – Uptownship
- 3084: Opafire – Opafire featuring Zachary Norman E.
- 3115: John Hicks, Cecil McBee & Elvin Jones – Power Trio

=== 63000 (BMG) series ===
- 63119: Steve Coleman and Five Elements – Black Science
- 63125: Steve Coleman – Rhythm in Mind
- 63136: Hugh Masekela – Beatin' Aroun de Bush
- 63141: John Hicks - Friends Old and New
- 63144: Steve Coleman and Five Elements – Drop Kick
- 63153: Mulgrew Miller – Hand in Hand
- 63160: Steve Coleman and Five Elements – The Tao of Mad Phat
- 63171: Mulgrew Miller – With Our Own Eyes
- 63176: Opafire – Without a Trace
- 63188: Mulgrew Miller – Getting to Know You
