= Air (free jazz trio) =

American free jazz trio

- Origin: Chicago, Illinois
- Genres: Jazz, free jazz
- Years active: 1971–1986
- Labels: Novus
- Past members: Henry Threadgill; Fred Hopkins; Steve McCall; Andrew Cyrille; Pheeroan Aklaff

Air was a free jazz trio founded by saxophone player Henry Threadgill, double bassist Fred Hopkins, and drummer Steve McCall in 1971.

== Career ==
Threadgill was asked by Columbia College in Chicago to arrange a number of Scott Joplin songs. Joplin was so strongly associated with piano that the musicians enjoyed the challenge of performing his trademark songs without piano. They opted to play them as rags and as a basis for jazz improvization.

The album Air Lore contains improvizations over songs by Scott Joplin as well as selections by Jelly Roll Morton.

Air broke up and reformed several times, and after McCall's death, Andrew Cyrille performed as part of the trio. They released two albums with drummer Pheeroan Aklaff as New Air on Black Saint Records.

== Discography ==
Album	Label	Year of release	Year Recorded
Air Song	Why Not	1975	1975
Air Raid	Why Not	1976	1976
Wildflowers 1: The New York Loft Jazz Sessions	Douglas	1977	1976
Open Air Suit	Arista Novus	1978	1978
Montreux Suisse	Arista Novus	1978	1978
Air Time	Nessa	1978	1977
Air Lore	Arista Novus	1979	1979
Live Air	Black Saint	1980	1976 & 1977
Air Mail	Black Saint	1981	1980
80° Below '82	Antilles	1982	1982
(As New Air) Live at Montreal International Jazz Festival	Black Saint	1984	1983
(As New Air) Air Show No. 1	Black Saint	1986	1986
