= Reggie Nicholson =

American jazz drummer (born 1957)

Reginald "Reggie" Nicholson (born July 17, 1957) is an American jazz drummer.

Nicholson took a bachelor's degree in percussion performance at Chicago State University and became a member of the Association for the Advancement of Creative Musicians in 1979, working early in his career with Ed Wilkerson. In the 1980s he played with Amina Claudine Myers, Henry Threadgill, and Ernest Dawkins; he relocated to New York City in 1988 but continued his associations with Threadgill and Dawkins there. For much of the 1990s he worked with Myra Melford, and also worked in that decade with Muhal Richard Abrams, Michael Marcus, Roy Campbell, Wilber Morris, Don Pullen, Billy Bang, Charles Gayle, Leroy Jenkins, Thomas Chapin, Reuben Wilson, and Jim Nolet. His work during this period included performances and collaborations across the Chicago and New York improvised-music scenes.

== Discography ==
=== As leader/co-leader ===
- ...You See What We're Sayin'? (CIMP, 1999) BMN Trio: with Thomas Borgmann and Wilber Morris
- Drum String Thing (CIMP, 2000) with Wilber Morris
- Unnecessary Noise Allowed (Abstract, 1997) as The Reggie Nicholson Concept
- Timbre Suite (Abstract Recordings, 2008) with Percussion Concept
- Live at Tunnel (Qbico, 2009) BMN Trio with Thomas Borgmann and Wilber Morris
- Nasty & Sweet (NoBusiness, 2013) with Thomas Borgmann and Wilber Morris

=== As sideman ===
With Muhal Richard Abrams

- Family Talk (Black Saint, 1993)
- Think All, Focus One (Black Saint, 1994 [1995])
- Song for All (Black Saint, 1995 [1997])
- One Line, Two Views (New World, 1995)

With Anthony Braxton

- Trillium R (Braxton House, 1999)

With Roy Campbell

- La Tierra del Fuego (Delmark, 1994)
- Communion (Silkheart, 1995)

With Thomas Chapin

- You Don't Know Me (Arabesque, 1995)
- Never Let Me Go: Quartets '95 & '96 (Playscape, 2012)

With Yuko Fujiyama

- Re-entry (CIMP, 2001)

With Charles Gayle

- Always Born (Silkheart, 1988)

With Lindsey Horner

- Never No More (Open Minds, 1991)

With Leroy Jenkins

- Leroy Jenkins Live! (Black Saint, 1993)

With Myra Melford

- Jump (Enemy, 1990)
- Now & Now (Enemy, 1992)
- Alive in the House of Saints (hat ART, 1993)
- Even the Sounds Shine (hat ART, 1995)

With Butch Morris

- Testament: A Conduction Collection - Conduction 38: In Freud's Garden / Conduction 39: Thread Waxing Space / Conduction 40: Thread Waxing Space (New World, 1995)

With Amina Claudine Myers

- Jumping in the Sugar Bowl (Minor Music, 1984)
- Country Girl (Minor Music, 1986)
- Amina (RCA Novus, 1987)
- In Touch (RCA Novus, 1989)
- Women in (E)Motion (Tradition & Moderne, 1993)

With Ernest Dawkins New Horizons Ensemble

- After the Dawn Has Risen (Open Minds, 1992)
- Chicago Now Vol. 1 (Slikheart, 1994 [1995])
- Chicago Now Vol. 2 (Slikheart, 1994 [1997])

With Shadow Vignettes

- Birth of a Notion (Sessoms, 1986)

With Malachi Thompson

- Talking Horns (Delmark, 2001) with Hamiet Bluiett and Oliver Lake

With Henry Threadgill

- You Know the Number (RCA Novus, 1986)
- Easily Slip Into Another World (RCA Novus, 1987)
- Rag, Bush and All (RCA Novus, 1989)
- Song Out of My Trees (Black Saint, 1994)

With Variable Density Sound Orchestra

- Evolving Strategies (Not Two, 2014)

With Edward Wilkerson

- Light on the Path (Sound Aspects, 1994)

With Stefan Winter

- Die Kleine Trompete / The Little Trumpet (JMT, 1986)
