= Environ =

Environ or environs may refer to:

- Environ (Loft), a New York performance space
- Ramboll Environ, or ENVIRON, a consulting firm in Arlington, Virginia
- Environs (journal), a student-run law review covering environmental subjects

== See also ==
- Environment (disambiguation)
