= View from Within =

Studio album by Muhal Richard Abrams
- Released: 1985
- Recorded: 11 & 27 September 1984
- Genre: Jazz
- Length: 42:32
- Label: Black Saint
- Producer: Giovanni Bonandrini

Muhal Richard Abrams chronology
Rejoicing with the Light (1983)	View from Within (1985)	Roots of Blue (1986)

View from Within is an album by Muhal Richard Abrams released on the Italian Black Saint label in 1985 and featuring performances of six of Abrams' compositions by an octet.

== Reception ==
Professional ratings
Review scores
Source	Rating
AllMusic	3.5/5 stars
The Penguin Guide to Jazz	3/4 stars

The AllMusic review by Ron Wynn states "This '84 date included some intriguing instrumental configurations at times (vibes/flute/percussion, piano/clarinet/bass clarinet) and ranked among his best '80s dates". The Penguin Guide to Jazz awarded the album 3 stars stating "View sounds like a thoroughly personal statement. The multi-instrumental approach lends it a fluid, unsettled quality, but with a huge timbral and textural range".

== Track listing ==
All compositions by Muhal Richard Abrams

1. "Laja" - 6:36
2. "View from Within" - 7:52
3. "Personal Conversations" - 7:45
4. "Down at Peppers" - 12:31
5. "Positrain" - 3:48
6. "Inner Lights" - 4:00

== Personnel ==
- Muhal Richard Abrams: piano, gongs
- Stanton Davis: trumpet, flugelhorn
- John Purcell: soprano saxophone, alto saxophone, tenor saxophone, bass clarinet, flute
- Marty Ehrlich: alto saxophone, flute, piccolo, tenor saxophone, clarinet, bass clarinet
- Warren Smith: vibraphone, marimba, gongs
- Ray Mantilla: bongos, conga, percussion
- Rick Rozie: bass
- Thurman Barker: drums orchestral bells, marimba, gong
