= Charles Clark (musician) =

American jazz musician

Charles E. Clark (March 11, 1945, in Chicago – April 15, 1969, in Chicago) was an American jazz double-bassist.

Before embarking on a professional career in 1963, Clark studied bass with Wilbur Ware. He played with Muhal Richard Abrams in the latter's Experimental Band between 1966 and 1968, recording with the ensemble on the album Levels and Degrees of Light. He was also one of the founders of the Association for the Advancement of Creative Musicians. Clark played live with Joseph Jarman in the late 1960s, sometimes employing percussion, koto, and cello as well as bass, and performed on Jarman's Delmark Records releases, Song For (1966) and As If It Were the Seasons (1968). Jarman later noted that Clark's death, as well as the death of pianist Christopher Gaddy, played a role in his decision to disband his own ensemble and join the Art Ensemble of Chicago.

== Discography ==
With Muhal Richard Abrams

- Levels and Degrees of Light (Delmark, 1968)

With the Art Ensemble of Chicago

- 1967/68 (Nessa, 1993) (compilation)
- Early Combinations (Nessa, 2012)

With Joseph Jarman

- Song For (Delmark, 1967)
- As If It Were the Seasons (Delmark, 1968)
