= Thurman Barker =

American jazz drummer

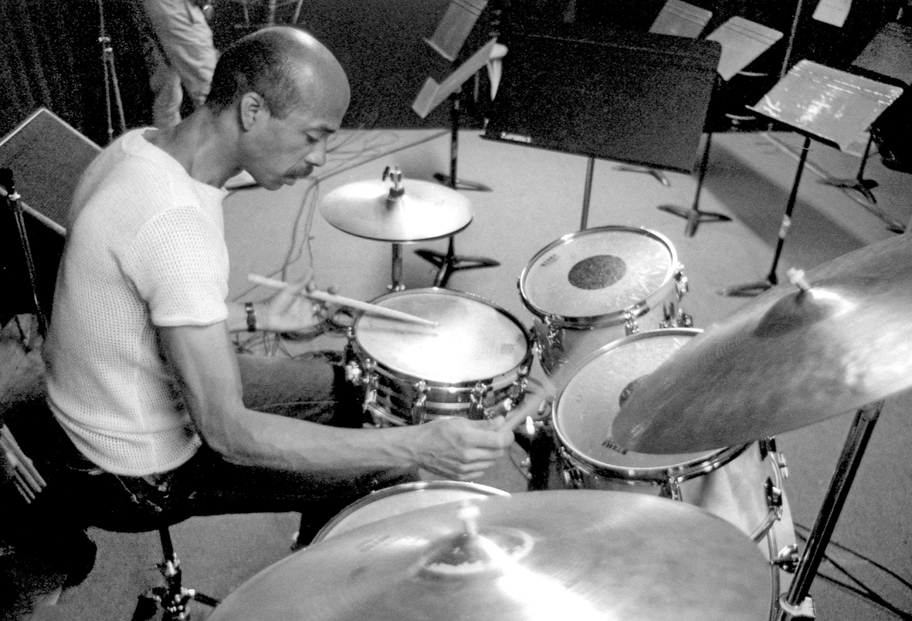
Thuman Barker in 1984

Thurman Barker (born January 8, 1948, Chicago, Illinois, United States) is an American jazz drummer.

Barker's first professional experience was at age sixteen with Mighty Joe Young. Barker took his bachelor's at Empire State College, then studied at the American Conservatory of Music under Harold Jones and at Roosevelt University. He next served as an accompanist for Billy Eckstine, Bette Midler, and Marvin Gaye. He was house percussionist at the Shubert Theater in Chicago for ten years. In 1968, he joined Joseph Jarman's first ensemble, and soon after became a member of the AACM in its early days. Aside from Jarman, he played in the late 1960s and 1970s with Muhal Richard Abrams, Pheeroan akLaff, Anthony Braxton, Billy Bang, Henry Threadgill, and Kalaparusha Maurice McIntyre. He recorded and toured again with Braxton in 1978-80 and with Sam Rivers in 1979–80. In 1985 he played in a trio with Jarman and Rivers, and in 1987 he played marimba with Cecil Taylor.

In the 1990s, Barker concentrated more on composition. His 1994 work Dialogue was premiered at the Merkin Concert Hall in New York City, and he composed Expansions (1999) for the Woodstock Chamber Orchestra. Since 1993 he has taught at Bard College, where he is currently Professor of Music. In 1999, he was guest lecturer at Smolny University in St. Petersburg, Russia.

== Discography ==
=== As leader ===
- The Way I Hear It (Uptee, 1999)
- Voyage (Uptee, 1999)
- Time factor (Uptee, 2001)
- Strike Force (Uptee, 2004)
- Rediscovered (Uptee, 2009)

=== As sideman ===
With Muhal Richard Abrams

- Levels and Degrees of Light (Delmark, 1967)
- Young at Heart/Wise in Time (Delmark, 1969)

With Billy Bang

- The Fire from Within (Soul Note, 1984)
- Live at Carlos 1 (Soul Note, 1986)

With Anthony Braxton

- Seven Compositions 1978 (Moers Music, 1979)
- Creative Orchestra (Köln) 1978 (hatART, 1978, released 1995)
- Performance (Quartet) 1979 (hatART)

With Joseph Jarman

- Song For (Delmark, 1966)
- As If It Were the Seasons (Delmark, 1968)

With Sam Rivers

- Waves (Tomato, 1978)
- Contrasts (ECM, 1979)
- Braids (NoBusiness, 1979 [2020])

With Cecil Taylor

- Live In Bologna (Leo, 1978)
- Live In Vienna (Leo, 1978)
- Olu Iwa (Soul Note, 1986)

other appearances :

- Pheeroan akLaff: Fits Like A Glove (Gramavision, 19839
- Art Ensemble Of Chicago: Art Ensemble 1967-68 (Nessa)
- Jerome Cooper: Outer and Interactions (About Time, 1988)
- Leroy Jenkins : Themes & Improvisations on the Blues (CRI, 1992)
- John Lindberg: Dimension 5 (Black Saint, 1981)
- Maurice McIntyre: Humility in the Light of the Creator (Delmark, 1969)
- Roscoe Mitchell: Roscoe Mitchell (Chief, 1978)
- Butch Morris: Testament - A Conduction Collection (New World, 1988–95)
- Amina Claudine Myers: The Circle of Time (Black Saint, 1983)
- Wadada Leo Smith: Human Rights (Kabell, 1986)
