= Roscoe Mitchell Quartet =

Live album by Roscoe Mitchell
- Released: 1976
- Recorded: October 4 & 5, 1975
- Venue: A Space, Toronto
- Genre: Jazz
- Length: 42:13; 63:45 (Delmark reissue)
- Label: Sackville
- Producer: Onari Productions

Roscoe Mitchell chronology
Solo Saxophone Concerts (1974)	Roscoe Mitchell Quartet (1976)	Nonaah (1977)

Roscoe Mitchell Quartet is an album by American jazz saxophonist Roscoe Mitchell recorded in 1975 and released on the Canadian Sackville label.

== Background ==
The album documents a two nights performance promoted by saxophonist and journalist Bill Smith, co-founder of Sackville Records, at A Space, an artist-run gallery in downtown Toronto. The quartet is a chamber-like ensemble composed of Mitchell, pianist Muhal Richard Abrams, co-founder of the AACM, trombonist George E. Lewis, a 23-year-old in his debut recording, and Detroit-native guitarist Spencer Barefield.

Mitchell is strongly associated with the influence of "classical" avant-garde, both European and American. If the Art Ensemble of Chicago formed a key part of Mitchell's expression, this band and later versions of their Sound Ensemble would permit him to emphasize the purely sonic interest of his earlier work.

== Music ==
Mitchell recorded the piece "Tnoona" previously with the Art Ensemble of Chicago in 1973 for the Fanfare for the Warriors album, where Abrams was also present. "Music For Trombone & B Flat Soprano" is a duo credited to Lewis. "Cards", a piece in which each player is given six cards with musical notation that can be arranged in any order and any tempo, demonstrates Mitchell's interest in chance procedures and the radical dismantling of form in the manner of John Cage. "Olobo" is performed as a trombone solo by Lewis.

In 2013 Delmark Records, which purchased the catalog of the Sackville label, reissued the album under the title Live at "A Space" 1975 augmented with 20 minutes of previously unissued material. The four bonus tracks include a reading of John Coltrane's classic ballad Naima with an extensive prelude, and a short ensemble version of his signature piece "Nonaah", which Mitchell originally wrote as a solo saxophone before the Art Ensemble played it also for Fanfare for the Warriors.

== Reception ==
Professional ratings
Review scores
Source	Rating
AllMusic	4/5 stars
The Rolling Stone Jazz Record Guide	3/5 stars

In his review for AllMusic, Brian Olewnick states about the original album "Roscoe Mitchell Quartet is a long-neglected minor classic and well worth hearing" The All About Jazz review by Hrayr Attarian says about the Delmark reissue that "listening to this exquisite disc is, without a doubt, demanding but it is also a rewarding and thrilling aural and intellectual ride."

== Track listing ==
All compositions by Roscoe Mitchell except as indicated

1. "Tnoona" - 6:46
2. "Music for Trombone & B Flat Soprano" (George E. Lewis) - 14:34
3. "Cards" - 9:58
4. "Olobo" - 9:38

Live at "A Space" 1975 (Delmark CD reissue)

1. "Prelude to Naima" - 9:00
2. "Naima" (John Coltrane)- 2:29
3. "Tnoona" - 6:46
4. "Music for Trombone & B Flat Soprano" (George E. Lewis) - 14:34
5. "Cards" - 9:58
6. "Olobo" - 9:38
7. "Dastura" - 5:55
8. "Nonaah" - 2:12

== Personnel ==
- Roscoe Mitchell - B flat soprano sax, alto sax, tenor sax
- Muhal Richard Abrams - piano
- George E. Lewis - trombone
- Spencer Barefield - guitar
