= Mama and Daddy =

Studio album by Muhal Richard Abrams
- Released: 1980
- Recorded: June 16 & 19 1980
- Genre: Jazz
- Label: Black Saint
- Producer: Muhal Richard Abrams

Muhal Richard Abrams chronology
Spihumonesty (1979)	Mama and Daddy (1980)	Duet (1981)

Mama and Daddy is an album by Muhal Richard Abrams. It was released on the Italian Black Saint label in 1980 and features performances of four of Abrams' compositions by a big band.

== Reception ==
The AllMusic review calls the album "a first-rate big band/large group session from 1980, with Muhal Richard Abrams' compositions being played by a masterful ensemble... adventurous, disciplined, frequently exciting music". The Penguin Guide to Jazz awarded the album 3 stars, stating: "These albums seem even more compelling now than they did when they first came out, because it is clear where the leader's ideas are going". The Rolling Stone Jazz Record Guide said "His finest achievement in any format may be Mama and Daddy; this ambitious set of compositions for a ten piece group, with its masterful blends of brass, strings, and percussion, has a balance in its glowing execution and suggests black chamber music".

Professional ratings
Review scores
Source	Rating
AllMusic	3.5/5 stars
The Penguin Guide to Jazz	3/4 stars
The Rolling Stone Jazz Record Guide	5/5 stars

== Track listing ==
All compositions by Muhal Richard Abrams

1. "Fafca" - 8:03
2. "Balu" - 7:41
3. "Malic" - 8:02
4. "Mama And Daddy" - 7:24
- Recorded June 16 & 19, 1980 at Platinum Factory Recording Studio, Brooklyn, New York

== Personnel ==
- Muhal Richard Abrams: piano, synthesizer, conductor
- Baikida Carroll: trumpet, flugelhorn
- Vincent Chancey: french horn
- George Lewis: trombone
- Wallace McMillan: alto saxophone, tenor saxophone, flute, congas
- Bob Stewart: tuba
- Leroy Jenkins: violin
- Brian Smith: bass
- Andrew Cyrille: percussion
- Thurman Barker: drums, marimba, percussion
