= In Walked Buckner =

Studio album by Roscoe Mitchell
- Released: 1999
- Recorded: July 13 and 14, 1998
- Studio: Riverside Studio, Chicago, IL
- Genre: Jazz
- Length: 64:17
- Label: Delmark; DE-510
- Producer: Robert G. Koester

Roscoe Mitchell chronology
Nine to Get Ready (1999)	In Walked Buckner (1999)	8 O'Clock: Two Improvisations (2001)

In Walked Buckner is an album by American saxophonist Roscoe Mitchell which was recorded in Chicago in 1998 and released on Delmark the following year. The album is dedicated to vocalist Thomas Buckner.

== Reception ==
Professional ratings
Review scores
Source	Rating
AllMusic	4/5 stars
The Penguin Guide to Jazz Recordings	3/4 stars

In his review for AllMusic, Michael G. Nastos states "This recording... captures the singing characteristics of Buckner in a purely instrumental way, and quite beautifully. Timbres are rare and off-kilter, free flowing, static, or flat-out swinging. In the middle is Mitchell, carrying the torch that has kept him a vital, adventurous American musician for three decades. ... They are convincing exhibits of Mitchell's position as perhaps the premier and essential improvised musical voice in the avant-garde of them all. In spirit, execution, and intent, Mitchell succeeds on all levels, except perhaps as a hitmaker. Surely his fans like it that way. Highly recommended to appreciators of this style"

== Track listing ==
All compositions by Roscoe Mitchell

1. "Off Shore" – 11:00
2. "In Walked Buckner" – 5:52
3. "Squeaky" – 7:36
4. "The Le Dreher Suite" – 8:55
5. "Three Sides of a Story" – 7:19
6. "Till Autumn" – 4:00
7. "Fly Over" – 11:11
8. "Opposite Sides" – 8:24

== Personnel ==
- Roscoe Mitchell - piccolo flute, baroque flute, bass recorder, clarinet, soprano saxophone, alto saxophone, small bells, whistles
- Jodie Christian – piano, small bells
- Reggie Workman – bass, percussion, whistles
- Albert "Tootie" Heath – drums, Egyptian flute, didgeridoo, small percussion
