= As If It Were the Seasons =

Studio album by Joseph Jarman
- Released: 1968
- Recorded: July 17, 1968 (track 1); June 19, 1968 (track 2)
- Studio: Ter-Mar Studios, Chicago
- Genre: Jazz
- Length: 44:45
- Label: Delmark
- Producer: Robert G. Koester

Joseph Jarman chronology
Song For (1966)	As If It Were the Seasons (1968)	Together Alone (1971)

As If It Were the Seasons is the second album by American jazz saxophonist Joseph Jarman, recorded in 1968 and released on the Delmark label.

== Background ==
After the death of Christopher Gaddy, who played piano on his debut album, Song For, Jarman played with the rhythm section of bassist Charles Clark and drummer Thurman Barker. For concerts he invited guests as Sherri Scott, who adds her voice to the trio for the first pieces in this record. Jarman composed “Song for Christopher”, based on incomplete notations by the pianist, as a memorial to Gaddy. The piece was recorded by the group augmented by six musicians. When Clark died on April 15, 1969, at twenty-four, he had taken part only in three recordings, Muhal Richard Abrams’s Levels and Degrees of Light, Jarman’s Song For and this album.

== Reception ==
Professional ratings
Review scores
Source	Rating
AllMusic	4/5 stars
The Penguin Guide to Jazz	3/4 stars
The Rolling Stone Jazz Record Guide	4/5 stars

Scott Yanow, in his review for AllMusic claims about the album "Certainly not for everyone's taste, the truly open-eared will find the innovative results quite intriguing." The Penguin Guide to Jazz states "the title-piece exemplifies Jarman's particular blending of lyricism, free space, drifting time and occasional bursts of intensity."

== Track listing ==
All compositions by Joseph Jarman

1. "As If It Were the Seasons / Song to Make the Sun Come Up" - 23:47
2. "Song for Christopher" - 20:58

== Personnel ==
- Joseph Jarman - alto sax, bassoon, fife, recorder, soprano sax
- Charles Clark - bass, cello, koto
- Thurman Barker - drums
- Sherri Scott - voice
- Muhal Richard Abrams - piano, oboe (track 2)
- Joel Brandon - flute (track 2)
- Fred Anderson - tenor sax (track 2)
- John Stubblefield - tenor sax (track 2)
- John Jackson - trumpet (track 2)
- Lester Lashley - trombone (track 2)

Everybody - bells, gong, harps
