= One Line, Two Views =

Studio album by Muhal Richard Abrams
- Released: 1995
- Recorded: June 23 & 24, 1995
- Studio: Electric Lady (Manhattan)
- Genre: Avant-garde jazz
- Label: New World
- Producer: Muhal Richard Abrams

Muhal Richard Abrams chronology
Song for All (1997)	One Line, Two Views (1995)	The Open Air Meeting (1997)

Professional ratings
Review scores
Source	Rating
Allmusic	4.5/5 stars

One Line, Two Views is an album by Muhal Richard Abrams released on New World Records in 1995. It features performances of seven of Abrams' compositions by Abrams, Eddie Allen, Patience Higgins, Marty Ehrlich, Bryan Carrott, Mark Feldman, Tony Cedras, Anne LeBaron, Lindsey Horner, and Reggie Nicholson.

== Reception ==
Scott Yanow of AllMusic deemed the album "certainly Abrams' shining hour — one of many bright moments for a pivotal American icon".

== Track listing ==
All compositions by Muhal Richard Abrams

1. "Textures 95" - 7:10
2. "The Prism 3" - 9:18
3. "Hydepth" - 13:34
4. "Tribute to Julius Hemphill and Don Pullen" - 4:07
5. "One Line, Two Views" - 11:55
6. "11 Over 4" - 12:02
7. "Ensemble Song" - 18:37

== Personnel ==
- Muhal Richard Abrams: piano, synthesizer, percussion, voice
- Eddie Allen: trumpet, percussion, voice
- Patience Higgins: tenor saxophone, bass clarinet, percussion, voice
- Marty Ehrlich: alto saxophone, bass clarinet, percussion, voice
- Bryan Carrott: vibraphone, percussion, voice
- Mark Feldman: violin, percussion, voice
- Tony Cedras: accordion, percussion, voice
- Anne LeBaron: harp, percussion, voice
- Lindsey Horner: double bass, percussion, voice
- Reggie Nicholson: drums, percussion, voice
