= A Magical Approach =

Live album by Jerome Cooper
- Released: 2010
- Recorded: April 17, 1978 and September 7, 2007
- Venues: Environ and an AACM concert in New York City
- Genre: Jazz
- Labels: Mutable Music; 17538-2

Jerome Cooper chronology
| Alone, Together, Apart (2003) | A Magical Approach (2010) | As of Not (2020) |

A Magical Approach is a live solo percussion album by Jerome Cooper. The first track was recorded in April 1978 at Environ in New York City, while the remaining tracks were recorded in September 2007 at an AACM concert in New York City. The album was released by Mutable Music in 2010.

"My Birds" is dedicated to Cooper's former Revolutionary Ensemble bandmates Sirone and Leroy Jenkins. The album as a whole is dedicated to the memory of Captain Walter Dyett of DuSable High School in Chicago.

== Reception ==
Professional ratings
Review scores
| Source | Rating |
|---|---|
| AllMusic | 4/5 stars |

In a review for AllMusic, arwulf arwulf wrote: "A Magical Approach... is recommended as an introduction to the inspired individualism of percussionist Jerome Cooper, who plainly states that his music cannot be categorized.... His primary innovation was to augment the standard American drum kit with the balafon... Placing this instrument securely on top of the snare drum, Cooper weaves rhythmic patterns and generates crosscurrents with a combination of balafon, bass drum, and hi-hat or sock cymbal. That is what was used to generate the remarkable sounds heard on the first track."

Writing for All About Jazz-New York, Francis Lo Kee called the album "a remarkable artistic statement," and commented: "it is extraordinarily absorbing with no dead spots. If we consider Max Roach the progenitor of solo drumset music... Cooper has not only expanded Roach's language by including other instruments, he's expanded on Roach's sense of rhythmic joy and excitement... Embrace the mystery, embrace the magic and do not miss a chance to see Jerome Cooper perform live."

In an article for The Sound Projector, Ed Pinsent stated: "Terrific percussion CD... Fred Brown did the cover painting, and inside you'll find a photo of Cooper's old high school band, where even the way he tilts his snare to the camera is a gesture of righteous attitude."

== Track listing ==
All compositions by Jerome Cooper.

1. "Root Assumptions" – 17:37
2. "A Melody" – 10:07
3. "My Birds" – 7:48
4. "3 is to 1 as 4 is to 2" – 4:41
5. "Munich" – 7:42
6. "For the People - In Fear - In Chaos" – 19:10
- Track 1 recorded at Environ in New York City, on April 17, 1978. Remaining tracks recorded at an AACM concert in New York City on September 7, 2007.

== Personnel ==
- Jerome Cooper – drums, balaphone, chirimia, keyboards
