= Loft jazz =

Music genre

- Other names: Loft scene; Loft era (retroactively)
- Stylistic origins: Jazz; jazz fusion; post-bop; Third stream; jazz-funk; free funk; avant-funk; avant-garde jazz; free jazz; experimental; avant-garde; free improvisation; contemporary classical; new music; downtown music; art music; world music; modernism; minimalism
- Cultural origins: Early-mid 1970s, New York City, United States

Fusion genres
- Punk jazz; jazzcore; No wave; post-rock; math rock

Local scenes
- New York City

Loft jazz (also known as the loft scene or loft era) was a cultural music phenomenon that occurred in New York City during the mid-1970s.

== Description ==
Gary Giddins described it as follows: "[A] new coterie of avant-garde musicians took much of the jazz world by surprise... [T]hey interpreted the idea of freedom as the capacity to choose between all the realms of jazz, mixing and matching them not only with each other, but with old and new pop, R&B and rock, classical music and world music... [S]eemingly overnight new venues - in many instances, apartments or lofts (hence the phrase 'loft jazz') - opened shop to present their wares."

According to Michael Heller, "lofts were not an organization, nor a movement, nor an ideology, nor a genre, nor a neighborhood, nor a lineage of individuals. They were, instead, a meeting point, a locus for interaction." Heller stated that "loft practices came to be defined by a number of key characteristics, including (1) low admission charges or suggested donations, (2) casual atmospheres that blurred the distinction between performer and audience, (3) ownership / administration by musicians, and (4) mixed-use spaces that combined both private living areas and public presentation space."

Regarding the music played in these venues, Michael J. Agovino wrote: "This was community music. Part of the point was that, free of the strictures of clubs, the music could be anything, go anywhere, go on for as long as it wanted." David Such stated that "the cutting contests, personality cults, and vices that characterized the jazz scene of the 1940s and 1950s were mostly missing." The scene was reviewed and documented by Giddins, Peter Occhiogrosso of the SoHo Weekly News, Leroi Jones, Robert Palmer, and Stanley Crouch.

Coinciding with this activity was an influx of musicians from outside New York. Newcomers from Chicago included a group associated with the AACM; these included Muhal Richard Abrams, Anthony Braxton, Kalaparusha Maurice McIntyre, Lester Bowie, Amina Claudine Myers, Henry Threadgill, Steve McCall, Fred Hopkins, Chico Freeman, Malachi Thompson, and George E. Lewis. Various members of the Black Artists Group came from St. Louis, including Charles "Bobo" Shaw, Baikida Carroll, Oliver Lake, Julius Hemphill, Hamiet Bluiett, J. D. Parran, and Joseph Bowie. Members of Horace Tapscott's UGMAA, such as Arthur Blythe, David Murray, and Butch Morris, arrived from California. All of these, plus many local musicians, participated in the loft scene to some degree.

Immediate predecessors to the loft scene were the establishment in the late 1960s of Ornette Coleman's Artist House, where he hosted musicians and dancers, and James DuBoise's Studio We. However, the scene did not begin to flourish until 1972, when, in reaction to the relocation of the Newport Jazz Festival to New York, locally based musicians established a counter-festival called the New York Musicians' Jazz Festival (NYMJF), with music presented in parks, community centers, and lofts. One of the most influential lofts during this time was Studio Rivbea, run by Sam Rivers and his wife Bea. Other lofts included Rashied Ali's Studio 77, which became Ali's Alley, Studio Infinity, run by Stanley Crouch and David Murray, Environ, run by John Fischer, the Ladies' Fort, Studio WIS, Firehouse Theater, and Sunrise Studios.

Musically, loft jazz was in many ways a continuation of the free jazz and avant-garde jazz traditions inaugurated by John Coltrane, Ornette Coleman, Albert Ayler, Pharoah Sanders, Archie Shepp, and Sun Ra. However, it didn't follow any one particular style or idiom. According to Scott Deveaux and Gary Giddins, "A critical byword of the Loft Era was 'eclecticism,' used to signal an enlightened approach to all styles of music." Few loft jazz musicians played continuously atonal or arhythmic music in the style of Coltrane's legendary albums Ascension and Om. They often combined conventional melodic elements with free jazz; used instruments less familiar to jazz, such as the bass saxophone, oboe and cello; and combined instruments in nontraditional formats, like the World Saxophone Quartet, whose changing members used a variety of saxophones and flutes, usually without any rhythm section. Not surprisingly, most of the musicians rejected the term "loft jazz" as too confining and not representative of their diversity.

The loft scene began to decline in the late 1970s and early 1980s, mainly due to a steady rise in rents.

== Recordings ==
A series of five LPs known as Wildflowers: The New York Loft Jazz Sessions was released on Casablanca Records in 1976, documenting sessions hosted by Sam Rivers at Studio Rivbea. The recordings were reissued on CD in 1999.
