= Bryan Carrott =

American jazz musician

Bryan Carrott is an American jazz musician playing vibraphone and marimba.

He has recorded with Butch Morris, Henry Threadgill, Dave Douglas, David "Fathead" Newman, Ralph Peterson, Steven Kroon, Greg Osby, Tom Harrell, John Lurie and The Lounge Lizards, Jay-Z and others.

Carrott is an assistant professor and coordinator of percussion instruction at Five Towns College.

== Discography ==
With Ralph Peterson

- Ralph Peterson presents The Fo'tet (1991) Blue Note
- Ralph Peterson's Fo'tet: Ornettology (1991) Blue Note/Somethin Else
- Ralph Peterson Fo'tet: The Reclamation Project (1991) Evidence
- Ralph Peterson Fo’tet: The Fo'tet Plays Monk (1997)
- Ralph Peterson Jr and The Fo'tet: Back to Stay (1999)

With Muhal Richard Abrams

- Song for All (Black Saint, 1995 [1997])
- One Line, Two Views (New World, 1995)

With Dave Douglas

- Witness (RCA, 2001)

With David "Fathead" Newman

- Under a Woodstock Moon (Kokopelli, 1996)
- Chillin' (HighNote, 1999)
- Davey Blue (HighNote, 2002)
- The Gift (HighNote, 2003)

With Greg Osby

- Art Forum (Blue Note)

With Sam Rivers, Ben Street, and Kresten Osgood

- Purple Violets (Stunt, 2005)

With Henry Threadgill

- Everybodys Mouth's a Book (Pi, 2001)
