= Song for All =

Studio album by Muhal Richard Abrams
- Released: 1997
- Recorded: April 26–29, 1995
- Genre: Jazz
- Label: Black Saint
- Producer: Muhal Richard Abrams

Muhal Richard Abrams chronology
Think All, Focus One (1995)	Song for All (1997)	One Line, Two Views (1995)

Professional ratings
Review scores
Source	Rating
Allmusic	4/5 stars
The Penguin Guide to Jazz	3.5/4 stars

Song for All is an album by Muhal Richard Abrams which was released on the Italian Black Saint label in 1997 and features performances of eight of Abrams' compositions by Abrams, Eddie Allen, Craig Harris, Eugene Ghee, Alfred Patterson, Brad Jones, and Reggie Nicholson.

== Reception ==
The Allmusic review by Scott Yanow calls the album "music that ranges from advanced hard bop (some of the grooves are quite straight-ahead) to some rather spacy explorations... complex yet often surprisingly accessible music... Well worth several listens". The Penguin Guide to Jazz awarded the album 3½ stars stating "the presence of a vibist makes a significant difference to Abrams's own approach. He sounds more concerned with colours and shapes than with the forward momentum of a piece, and it is all to the good".

== Track listing ==
All compositions by Muhal Richard Abrams

1. "Song for All" - 6:37
2. "Dabadubada" - 8:54
3. "Marching With Honor" - 7:35
4. "GMBR" - 13:49
5. "Over the Same Over" - 19:59
6. "Linetime" - 9:10
7. "Steamin' up the Road" - 7:14
8. "Imagine" - 4:02
- Recorded on April 26–29, 1995 at East Side Sound, New York City

== Personnel ==
- Muhal Richard Abrams: piano, synthesizer
- Eddie Allen: trumpet
- Aaron Stewart: tenor saxophone, soprano saxophone
- Craig Harris: trombone
- Bryan Carrott: vibraphone, percussion
- Brad Jones: bass
- Reggie Nicholson: drums
- Richarda Abrams: voice
