= Duet (Muhal Richard Abrams album) =

Studio album by Muhal Richard Abrams
- Released: 1981
- Recorded: 11–12 May 1981
- Genre: Jazz
- Length: 44:10
- Label: Black Saint

Muhal Richard Abrams chronology
Mama and Daddy (1980)	Duet (1981)	Blues Forever (1982)

Duet is an album by Muhal Richard Abrams featuring duet performances with Amina Claudine Myers, released on the Italian Black Saint label in 1981.

== Reception ==
Critical views of the album have been mixed. The AllMusic review by Ron Wynn states: "This was an intense, yet also swinging, enjoyable session, one in which Abrams displayed the mastery of multiple genres that's distinguished his music, and Myers her distinctive mix of secular and spiritual elements". The Penguin Guide to Jazz awarded the album 2 1/2 stars, stating: "Retrospect hasn't changed our view that the two pianists simply get in each other's way". The Rolling Stone Jazz Record Guide called the album "a surprisingly lyrical and diverse encounter".

Professional ratings
Review scores
Source	Rating
AllMusic	3/5 stars
The Penguin Guide to Jazz	2.5/4 stars
The Rolling Stone Jazz Record Guide	4/5 stars

== Track listing ==
All compositions by Muhal Richard Abrams except as indicated

1. "Transparency of Lobo Lubu" - 9:55
2. "Miss Amina" - 7:42
3. "Swang Rag Swang" - 4:30
4. "Down the Street from the Gene Ammons Public School" - 5:05
5. "Journey Home as Seen Through the Fairness of Life" - 6:49
6. "Dance from the East" (Amina Claudine Myers) - 6:00
7. "One for Peggy" (Abrams, Myers) - 4:09
- Recorded May 11 & 12, 1981 at Barigozzi Studio, Milano

== Personnel ==
- Muhal Richard Abrams – piano
- Amina Claudine Myers – piano
