= Song For =

Studio album by Joseph Jarman
- Released: 1967
- Recorded: December 16, 1966; October 20, 1966 (tracks 2,5)
- Studio: Sound Studios, Chicago
- Genre: Jazz
- Length: 40:47 (LP); 51:37 (CD)
- Label: Delmark
- Producer: Robert G. Koester

Joseph Jarman chronology
Song For (1967)	As If It Were the Seasons (1968)

Song For is the debut album by American jazz saxophonist Joseph Jarman, recorded in 1966 and released on the Delmark label.

== Background ==
Jarman's regular quintet with saxophonist Fred Anderson, trumpeter Billy Brimfield, bassist Charles Clark and drummer Thurman Barker was augmented for the record by another drummer, Steve McCall, and a new figure, pianist Christopher Gaddy, who had just returned from army service. Gaddy died on March 12, 1968, at age 24. Song For was his only recorded performance. Before joining Jarman, Anderson and Brimfield co-led a quartet which was one of the seminal AACM group.

== Music ==
"Adam's Rib" is a Brimfield tune, while "Little Fox Run"" is an Anderson composition (the CD edition adds an unissued take of this piece). “Non-Cognitive Aspects of the City” is a work combining music with an extended poem by Jarman himself.

== Reception ==
Professional ratings
Review scores
Source	Rating
AllMusic	5/5 stars
The Penguin Guide to Jazz	3/4 stars
The Rolling Stone Jazz Record Guide	4/5 stars

Scott Yanow, in his review for AllMusic claims "this music was the next step in jazz after the high-energy passions of the earlier wave of the avant-garde started to run out of fresh ideas". The Penguin Guide to Jazz states about the album "Of great documentary and historical significance, though unlikely to effect any dramatic conversions."

== Track listing ==
All compositions by Joseph Jarman except as indicated

1. "Little Fox Run" (Fred Anderson) - 7:05
2. "Non-Cognitive Aspects of the City" - 14:06
3. "Adam's Rib" (Billy Brimfield) - 5:57
4. "Song For" - 13:39

Bonus track on CD

5. "Little Fox Run (Unissued)" (Fred Anderson) - 10:50

== Personnel ==
- Joseph Jarman - alto sax, recitation
- Bill Brimfield - trumpet (does not appear on track 2)
- Fred Anderson - tenor sax (does not appear on track 2)
- Christopher Gaddy - piano, marimba
- Charles Clark - bass
- Thurman Barker - drums
- Steve McCall - drums (does not appear on tracks 2,5)
