= Song Out of My Trees =

Studio album by Henry Threadgill
- Released: 1994
- Recorded: August 17, 18, & 19, 1993
- Genre: Jazz
- Length: 46:01
- Label: Black Saint
- Producer: Giovanni Bonandrini

Henry Threadgill chronology
Too Much Sugar for a Dime (1992)	Song Out of My Trees (1994)	Carry the Day (1995)

Song Out of My Trees is an album by Henry Threadgill released on the Black Saint label in 1994. The album features five of Threadgill's compositions performed by a variety of ensembles that include Threadgill, Ted Daniel, Brandon Ross, Jerome Richardson, James Emery, Ed Cherry, Myra Melford, Tony Cedras, Amina Claudine Myers, Diedre Murray, Michelle Kinney, Gene Lake, and Reggie Nicholson.

== Reception ==
The Allmusic review by Ron Wynn awarded the album 3 stars, stating, "Even a champion of the unorthodox like Threadgill may have some people scratching their heads after they hear this, but it is a signal that he'll never settle for doing what's expected".

Professional ratings
Review scores
Source	Rating
Allmusic	3/5 stars
The Penguin Guide to Jazz Recordings	3.5/4 stars

== Track listing ==
All compositions by Henry Threadgill

1. "Gateway" – 9:24
2. "Over the River Club" – 9:24
3. "Grief" – 10:11
4. "Crea" – 8:47
5. "Song Out of My Trees" – 8:15

Recorded at Sear Sound, New York City on August 17, 18, & 19, 1993

== Personnel ==
- Henry Threadgill – alto saxophone (tracks 1, 3 & 5)
- Ted Daniel – trumpet (track 1), hunting horns (track 4)
- Brandon Ross – guitar (track 1), alto guitar (tracks 2 & 4)
- Jerome Harris (originally miscredited as Jerome Richardson) – acoustic bass guitar (track 1), bass guitar (tracks 2 & 4)
- James Emery – soprano guitar (tracks 2 & 4)
- Ed Cherry – guitar (tracks 2, 4 & 5)
- Myra Melford – piano (track 2)
- Tony Cedras – accordion (track 3)
- Amina Claudine Myers – harpsichord (track 3), organ (track 5)
- Diedre Murray, Michelle Kinney – cello (track 3)
- Gene Lake – drums (track 1)
- Reggie Nicholson – drums (track 5)
- Mossa Bildner – vocals (track 3)
