= Easily Slip Into Another World =

Easily Slip into Another World

Studio album by Henry Threadgill
- Released: 1987
- Recorded: September 20, 1987
- Studio: Mediasound, New York City
- Genre: Jazz
- Label: RCA Novus
- Producer: Steve Backer

Henry Threadgill chronology
You Know the Number (1986)	Easily Slip into Another World (1987)	Rag, Bush and All (1988)

Easily Slip into Another World is an album by saxophonist/composer Henry Threadgill, recorded for the RCA Novus label in 1987.

== Recording and music ==
The album was recorded at Mediasound Studios, New York City, on September 20, 1987.

The album features five of Threadgill's compositions (six on CD) and one by Olu Dara. The musicians are Threadgill with Frank Lacy, Rasul Siddik, Fred Hopkins, Diedre Murray, Pheeroan akLaff and Reggie Nicholson, with guest vocalist Asha Puthli (credited as Aisha Putli) added on "My Rock".

== Reception ==
Professional ratings
Review scores
Source	Rating
AllMusic	4/5 stars
DownBeat	4.5/5 stars
The Penguin Guide to Jazz	3/4 stars
The Philadelphia Inquirer	4/4 stars

The AllMusic review by Stephen Cook stated: "Easily Slip Into Another World and Threadgill's other Novus titles (You Know the Number and Rag, Bush and All) offer a fine introduction to the work of one of jazz's best and most underrated composers and improvisers".

== Track listing ==
All compositions by Henry Threadgill except as indicated

1. "I Can't Wait Till I Get Home" (Olu Dara) – 4:04
2. "Black Hands Bejewelled" – 7:03
3. "Spotted Dick is Pudding" – 8:51
4. "Let Me Look Down Your Throat or Say Ah" – 7:11 Bonus track on CD
5. "My Rock" – 8:09
6. "Hall" – 4:02
7. "Award the Squadtett" – 6:59

== Personnel ==
- Henry Threadgill – alto saxophone, tenor saxophone, bass flute
- Rasul Siddik – trumpet
- Frank Lacy – trombone
- Diedre Murray – cello
- Fred Hopkins – bass
- Reggie Nicholson – percussion
- Pheeroan akLaff – percussion
- Asha Puthli (credited as Aisha Putli) – vocals (track 5)
