= SoundDance =

Live album by Muhal Richard Abrams
- Released: 2011
- Recorded: October 16, 2009 and September 24, 2010
- Venue: AACM concerts, New York City
- Genre: jazz
- Label: Pi Recordings; Pi37

Muhal Richard Abrams chronology
Spectrum (2009)	SoundDance (2011)

SoundDance is a two-disc live album by pianist Muhal Richard Abrams. It was recorded at AACM concerts in New York City in October 2009 and September 2010, and released by Pi Recordings in 2011.

The album was issued in celebration of Abrams's 80th birthday, and features two fully-improvised sets. The first set, recorded in 2009, pairs Abrams with saxophonist Fred Anderson, and is their first recording together despite their having known each other for over fifty years. (Anderson died in 2010; this may be his last recording.) The second set, recorded in 2010, pairs Abrams with George Lewis, who is heard on trombone and laptop.

When asked about his role in the recording, Lewis stated that he spent time preparing sound files, but noted: "of course one cannot and should not attempt to account for every contingency in a performance of improvised music, since to eliminate those would be to destroy a large part of the sound; in other words, the contingencies, thinking, puzzles, blockages, conundrums, paradoxes and breakthroughs are embedded in the sound that audience and performers encounter at about the same moment. As I hear it, notes, timbres, melodies, durations, and the rest are carriers for a more complex symbolic signal that includes these higher-level elements that we all experience each day of our lives. Once musicians, critics, and audiences learn to understand this higher signal, the pleasures that result will allow listening to improvised music to be understood as a most elementally human form of interaction."

== Reception ==
Professional ratings
Review scores
Source	Rating
AllMusic	4.5/5 stars
DownBeat	4/5 stars
All About Jazz	4/5 stars

In a review for AllMusic, Sean Westergaard wrote the following regarding the Abrams/Anderson duos: "The fact that Anderson almost always played with a rhythm section (certainly a drummer at least), and almost never played with piano, makes this a particularly interesting set. Here, Abrams and Anderson are equals: grabbing ideas from each other and transforming them along the way. Their mastery of space and dynamics makes for a brilliant conversation over the course of nearly 40 minutes. Both men were about eighty years old at the time of recording, and both were at the absolute peak of their powers. It's some of the most melodic free improvisation you will ever hear, and a truly breathtaking and amazing piece of music." Concerning the Abrams/Lewis tracks, he commented: "Muhal plays a more dominant role here as there isn't a whole lot of melodic content in the electronics. They play more of a textural role that Abrams reacts to rather than a true conversation as with Anderson.... It's really fascinating to hear how Muhal responds in this setting, proving once again he's one of the finest improvisers on the planet." Westergaard concluded: "This is the Old Guard of Chicago jazz and AACM ideals at their best. SoundDance is unqualified genius."

Regarding the duets with Anderson, Peter Margasak, writing for DownBeat, stated: "The two icons engage in a battle of wills guided by a communal artistic vision; they find ways to make their disparate improvisational approaches work, and in those differences it's easy to notice how attuned to one another they are." Concerning the pairing with Lewis, he wrote: "here there's a much greater use of space, silence and drift... These sounds give Abrams plenty of space to work with, which allows him to grow both meditative and brooding." Margasak concluded: "Age obviously hasn't slowed down Abrams at all."

Writer Gene Seymour stated: "Both Abrams and Anderson seem energized by the task of extending or enhancing each other's thoughts and even listeners resistant to free-form improvisation won't miss a beat." Regarding the disc featuring Lewis, he remarked: "These two masters of orchestration create intricate, spiraling patterns that are at once imposing and puckish. You can wander in and out of their gallery of sound and find something strange, shiny and, in a peculiar way, companionable."

In a review for Jazz Times, Lloyd Sachs commented: "SoundDance is a momentous release... For all they signify, the two live, improvised sets on SoundDance are full of disarming invention and low-key charm."

== Track listing ==
=== Disc 1: Focus, ThruTime… Time→ ===
1. "Part 1" – 8:10
2. "Part 2" – 8:45
3. "Part 3" – 5:59
4. "Part 4" – 15:16
- Recorded October 16, 2009.

=== Disc 2: SoundDance ===
1. "Part 1" – 10:43
2. "Part 2" – 11:17
3. "Part 3" – 5:21
4. "Part 4" – 17:55
- Recorded September 24, 2010.

== Personnel ==
- Muhal Richard Abrams – piano
- Fred Anderson – tenor saxophone (disc 1)
- George Lewis – trombone, laptop (disc 2)
