= Jumping in the Sugar Bowl =

Studio album by Amina Claudine Myers
- Released: 1984
- Recorded: March 1984; Tonstudio Bauer, Ludwigsburg, Germany
- Genre: Jazz
- Length: 47:44
- Label: Minor Music
- Producer: Stephan Meyner

Amina Claudine Myers chronology
The Circle of Time (1983)	Jumping in the Sugar Bowl (1984)	Country Girl (1985)

Jumping in the Sugar Bowl is the fourth album by American pianist Amina Claudine Myers featuring performances recorded in 1984 for the Minor Music label.

== Reception ==
The Allmusic review by Ron Wynn awarded the album 4 stars stating "Intense, provocative mixture of outside and inside sensibilities. Myers at times ranges and attacks the keyboard, then will change direction and display a soulful, gospel-influenced style. The constantly shifting session keeps things interesting, and there are some fine solos as well".

Professional ratings
Review scores
Source	Rating
Allmusic	4/5 stars
The Rolling Stone Jazz Record Guide	4/5 stars

== Track listing ==
All compositions by Amina Claudine Myers except as indicated

1. "Jumping in the Sugar Bowl" - 8:31
2. "Another Day" (Catherine Bowne, Amina Claudine Myers) - 6:03
3. "Cecil B" - 9:24
4. "Guten Morgen" - 9:46
5. "Mind Chambers" - 6:10
6. "Cameloupe" - 7:50

- Recorded at Tonstudio Bauer in Ludwigsburg, Germany in March 1984

== Personnel ==
- Amina Claudine Myers - piano, organ, voice
- Thomas Palmer - bass, electric bass
- Reggie Nicholson - percussion, voice
