= Blues Forever =

1982 studio album by Muhal Richard Abrams

Studio album by Muhal Richard Abrams
- Released: 1982
- Recorded: July 20, 21, 27, 1981
- Studio: Barigozzi Studio, Milan
- Genre: Jazz
- Length: 42:21
- Label: Black Saint
- Producer: Giovanni Bonandrini

Muhal Richard Abrams chronology
Duet (1981)	Blues Forever (1982)	Rejoicing with the Light (1983)

Blues Forever is an album by Muhal Richard Abrams, released by the Italian label Black Saint in 1982 and featuring performances of seven Abrams compositions by an eleven-member big band.

== Critical reception ==
Professional ratings
Review scores
Source	Rating
AllMusic	4/5 stars
The Penguin Guide to Jazz	3.5/4 stars
The Rolling Stone Jazz Record Guide	5/5 stars

The AllMusic review by Ron Wynn stated: "Although every arrangement doesn't click, the band successfully romps and stomps through enough cuts to show that the big band sound doesn't just mean 'ghost' groups recreating dusty numbers from the 1930s and 1940s." The Rolling Stone Jazz Record Guide called the album "Abrams's crowning achievement". The Penguin Guide to Jazz described it as "a sparkling big-band date with some demanding charts and a vivid sub-current of the blues".

== Track listing ==
- All compositions by Muhal Richard Abrams
1. "Ancient and Future Reflections" – 6:46
2. "Du King" (Dedicated to Duke Ellington) – 2:00
3. "Chambea" – 7:30
4. "Duet for One World" – 4:53
5. "Blues Forever" – 9:01
6. "Cluster for Many Worlds" – 5:02
7. "Quartet to Quartet" – 7:09

== Personnel ==
- Muhal Richard Abrams – piano, conductor
- Baikida Carroll – trumpet, flugelhorn
- Craig Harris – trombone
- Wallace Leroy McMillan – baritone saxophone, flute
- Jimmy Vass – alto saxophone, flute
- Eugene Ghee – tenor saxophone, clarinet
- Vincent Chancey – French horn
- Howard Johnson – tuba, baritone saxophone
- Jean-Paul Bourelly – guitar
- Michael Logan – bass
- Andrew Cyrille – drums
