= Too Much Sugar for a Dime =

Studio album by Henry Threadgill
- Released: 1993
- Recorded: 1993
- Genre: Jazz
- Length: 53:43
- Label: Axiom
- Producer: Henry Threadgill, Bill Laswell

Henry Threadgill chronology
Live at Koncepts (1991)	Too Much Sugar for a Dime (1993)	Song Out of My Trees (1993)

Professional ratings
Review scores
Source	Rating
Allmusic	link

Too Much Sugar for a Dime is an album by Henry Threadgill, released in 1993 on the Axiom label. It has been described as: "a mad, glorious romp which explores some very dark timbres and tonalities and yet remains witty, fresh and consistently exciting." (Richard Cook & Brian Morton, The Penguin Guide to Jazz on CD).

== Track listing ==
All compositions written by Henry Threadgill.

1. "Little Pocket Size Demons" – 10:49
2. "In Touch" – 8:49
3. "Paper Toilet" – 5:39
4. "Better Wrapped / Better Unrapped" – 13:05
5. "Too Much Sugar" – 2:58
6. "Try Some Ammonia" – 12:23

== Personnel ==
- Henry Threadgill — alto saxophone
- Mark Taylor — French horn
- Edwin Rodriguez — tuba
- Marcus Rojas — tuba
- Dorian L. Parreott II — tuba (tracks 2, 4, 6)
- Brandon Ross — guitar (electric & acoustic)
- Masujaa — guitar (electric)
- Simon Shaheen — oud and violin (2, 4)
- Jason Hwang — violin (2, 4)
- Leroy Jenkins — violin (2, 4)
- Gene Lake — drums (exc. track 5)
- Larry Bright — drums (2, 4), cymbals (5)
- Miguel Urbina — afrovenezuelan drums, Culo'e puya drums, fulía drums (2, 4, 5)
- Johnny Rudas — afrovenezuelan drums, Culo'e puya drums, fulía drums (2, 4)
- Mossa Bildner — vocals (2)
- Arenae — vocals (2)
