= As of Not =

Studio album by Jerome Cooper and Kresten Osgood
- Released: 2020
- Recorded: 2011
- Studio: Copenhagen
- Genre: Jazz, percussion music
- Label: ILK Music; ILK296LP

Jerome Cooper chronology
A Magical Approach (2010)	As of Not (2020)

As of Not is a double-LP album by American percussionist Jerome Cooper and Danish percussionist and pianist Kresten Osgood. It was recorded in 2011 while Cooper was visiting Copenhagen for symposia, masterclasses, and concerts, and was released by the Danish artist-run label and collective ILK Music in 2020. The album features a seven-part percussion-oriented suite composed by Cooper.

== Reception ==
Professional ratings
Review scores
Source	Rating
The Free Jazz Collective	4.5/5 stars

In a review for The Free Jazz Collective, Nick Ostrum declared "something about this album grabbed me right from the beginning," and wrote: "The percussion is there and sometimes layered but hardly consumes the pieces... it is simultaneously rooted in spiritual jazz (think Sanders, Coltrane, and the more Egyptesque Sun Ra) rhythms and ritualism, the Revolutionary Ensemble's dedication to genre-blending (though in a decidedly different form), and contemporary tendencies toward deconstruction. I am not sure I can put my finger on what exactly is new in all of this. But I can attest that, regardless of novelty, As of Not is some genuinely powerful music."

Robert Iannapollo, writing for The New York City Jazz Record, commented: "The piece begins with a passage of sustained stasis over an electronic drone and carefully placed piano. Midway through Osgood starts playing a motif matched by Cooper on balafon for a minimalist interlude. 'Part 2' extensively features chirimira over wandering piano lines and an electronic rhythm... Cooper clearly was going for something universal and succeeds for the most part. And Osgood is there along with him. The two were a good team to realize this music."

== Track listing ==
All compositions by Jerome Cooper.

=== Disc 1 ===
==== Side A ====
1. "Part 1" – 9:30
2. "Part 2" – 12:16

==== Side B ====
1. "Part 3" – 12:13

=== Disc 2 ===
==== Side A ====
1. "Part 4" – 10:34
2. "Part 5" – 9:25

==== Side B ====
1. "Part 6" – 2:08
2. "Part 7" – 3:10
- Recorded in Copenhagen in 2011.

== Personnel ==
- Jerome Cooper – drums, chirimia, balafon, electronic tonal activator
- Kresten Osgood – drums, piano
