= Vision Towards Essence =

Live album by Muhal Richard Abrams
- Released: 21 August 2007
- Recorded: 11 September 1998
- Genre: Jazz
- Length: 58:45
- Label: Pi Recordings
- Producer: Muhal Richard Abrams & Yulun Wang

Muhal Richard Abrams chronology
Streaming (1990)	Vision Towards Essence (2007)

Vision Towards Essence is a live album of solo piano by Muhal Richard Abrams released on the Pi Recordings label in 2007.

== Reception ==
Professional ratings
Review scores
Source	Rating
AllMusic	4.5/5 stars
The Penguin Guide to Jazz	4/4 stars

The AllMusic review by Thom Jurek states "This is indeed one of the most important records ever released by this great man". The Penguin Guide to Jazz wrote that "Part 1" "has tentative moments, areas of slow transition which are slightly dull on first hearing though their logic becomes clearer over time. The other two parts are flawless".

== Track listing ==
1. "Part 1" - 20:06
2. "Part 2" - 18:23
3. "Part 3" - 20:16

All compositions by Muhal Richard Abrams
- Recorded live at the Guelph Jazz Festival, Guelph, Canada on September 11, 1998.

== Personnel ==
- Muhal Richard Abrams - piano
