= Think All, Focus One =

Studio album by Muhal Richard Abrams
- Released: 1995
- Recorded: 15–16 July 1994
- Genre: Jazz
- Label: Black Saint
- Producer: Muhal Richard Abrams

Muhal Richard Abrams chronology
| Family Talk (1993) | Think All, Focus One (1995) | Song for All (1997) |

Professional ratings
Review scores
| Source | Rating |
|---|---|
| Allmusic | 4/5 stars |
| The Penguin Guide to Jazz | 3.5/4 stars |

Think All, Focus One is an album by Muhal Richard Abrams which was released on the Italian Black Saint label in 1995 and features performances of seven of Abrams' compositions by Abrams, Eddie Allen, David Gilmore, Eugene Ghee, Alfred Patterson, Brad Jones, and Reggie Nicholson.

== Reception ==
The Allmusic review by Scott Yanow states "Due to the frequently dense ensembles of the septet and the complexity of the music, this set will take several listens to fully absorb, but it is well worth the effort". The Penguin Guide to Jazz awarded the album 3½ stars calling it "fine, thoroughly thought jazz".

== Track listing ==
All compositions by Muhal Richard Abrams

1. "Before and After" - 8:37
2. "The Harmonic Veil" - 6:23
3. "Crossbeams" - 8:42
4. "The Junction" - 8:33
5. "Scaledance" - 5:55
6. "Encore" - 12:46
7. "Think All, Focus One" - 5:36
- Recorded on July 15 & 16, 1994 at East Side Sound, NYC

== Personnel ==
- Eddie Allen: trumpet
- Eugene Ghee: tenor saxophone, bass clarinet
- Alfred Patterson: trombone
- David Gilmore: guitar
- Brad Jones: bass
- Reggie Nicholson: drums
- Muhal Richard Abrams: piano, synthesizer
