= Salutes Bessie Smith =

Studio album by Amina Claudine Myers
- Released: 1980
- Recorded: June 19 & 22, 1980
- Genre: Jazz
- Length: 43:38
- Label: Leo
- Producer: Leo Feigin

Amina Claudine Myers chronology
Song for Mother E (1979)	Salutes Bessie Smith (1980)	The Circle of Time (1983)

Salutes Bessie Smith is the second album by American pianist Amina Claudine Myers, recorded in 1980 for the Leo label.

== Reception ==
The AllMusic review by Michael G. Nastos stated: "Vocal perfection and landmark recording for this keyboardist and singer. Desert island music".

Professional ratings
Review scores
Source	Rating
AllMusic	4.5/5 stars
The Penguin Guide to Jazz Recordings	4/4 stars
The Rolling Stone Jazz Record Guide	5/5 stars

== Track listing ==
All compositions by Amina Claudine Myers except as indicated

1. "Wasted Life Blues" (Bessie Smith) - 6:58
2. "Dirty No-Gooder's Blues" (Smith) - 4:13
3. "Jailhouse Blues" (Smith) - 6:43
4. "It Makes My Love Come Down" (Smith) - 3:50
5. "The Blues [Straight to You]" - 7:10
6. "African Blues" - 14:44

- Recorded at Big Apple Recording Studios in New York City on June 19 & 22, 1980

== Personnel ==
- Amina Claudine Myers - piano, organ, voice
- Cecil McBee - bass
- Jimmy Lovelace - drums, bells
