= John Fischer (pianist) =

American jazz musician (1930–2016)

John Fischer (11 August 1930 – 17 August 2016) was an American pianist, composer, and artist. He was a pioneer in the field of computer art. In the 1970s, during the loft jazz era in New York City, Fischer ran a performance loft and gallery known as Environ. He was leader of the group Interface, and he performed with Perry Robinson, Mark Whitecage, Arthur Blythe, Rick Kilburn, and Lester Bowie.

== Discography ==
- 6x1=10 Duos for a New Decade (ReEntry, 1980)
- Jam Session Moscow with Hans Kumpf, Leonid Tchizhik, Alexey Zubov (Fusion, 1981)
- Live in Eastern Europe with Perry Robinson (ReEntry, 1982)
- Deep Blue Lake with Theo Jörgensmann (ReEntry, 1984)
- Piano Solo (ReEntry, 1984)

With INTERface

- INTERface NY (Composers Collective, 1976)
- Live at Environ (ReEntry, 1977)
- This Time (ReEntry, 1978)
- Glimpses (ReEntry, 1979)
- Environ Days (Konnex, 1991)
- The New INTERface TRIO (ReEntry, 1995)
- Live at the BIM (ReEntry, 1997)

With others

- Composers Collective, Poum! (Composers Collective, 1974)
- Theo Jörgensmann, Swiss Radio Days Vol. Three (ReEntry, 1994)

== Exhibitions ==
- Allan Stone Gallery, New York, (1970)
- Palais des Nations, Geneva, (1981)
- Jazz meets Art, Zürich, (1985)
- Galerie Comtemporaine Geneve, (1981)
- Galerie Adriana Stuttgart, (1989)
- Duo Gallery, New York, 1960
- Phoenix Gallery New York, (1963)
- Glay's Gallery New York, (1967)
- MOMA Jewelry by Contemporary Painters and Sculptors, (1967)
- Chelsea Art Museum, New York, (2011)
- NYC Department Cultural Affairs Oversized Drawings and Multiples (1972–73)
- Arbitrage Gallery New York A show of Paper Works ( 1993)
- Galerie OM Art & Musique Interface, France, (1989)
- Lerner Heller Gallery, New York, Drawings, ( 1972
- Gallery Alexandra Monet, Brussels Drawings and Paintings, (1974)
