= Afrisong =

Studio album by Muhal Richard Abrams
- Released: 1975
- Recorded: September 9, 1975
- Genre: Jazz
- Label: India Navigation; Whynot Records
- Producer: Kazuo Harada & Kuniya Inaoka

Muhal Richard Abrams chronology
Things to Come from Those Now Gone (1975)	Afrisong (1975)	Sightsong (1977)

Afrisong is a solo piano album by Muhal Richard Abrams which was released on India Navigation and the Japanese Trio/Whynot label and features seven performances by Abrams recorded in Chicago in September 1975.

== Reception ==
The Allmusic review states: "Muhal Richard Abrams seamlessy blended elements of stride, bebop, blues, and free music on this collection of solo piano pieces.... It was also a chance for Abrams to display his instrumental facility and underrated keyboard skills, which often take a back seat to his arranging, compositions and bandleading."The Rolling Stone Jazz Record Guide said the album "contains the best of his early solo work".

Professional ratings
Review scores
Source	Rating
Allmusic	2.5/5 stars
The Rolling Stone Jazz Record Guide	4/5 stars

== Track listing ==
All compositions by Muhal Richard Abrams

1. "Afrisong" – 5:03
2. "The Infinite Flow" – 5:55
3. "Peace On You" – 7:35
4. "Hymn to the East" – 4:30
5. "Roots" – 3:56
6. "Blues For M." – 3:44
7. "The New People" – 10:11
- Recorded at Universal Recording Studios, Chicago, on September 9, 1975

== Personnel ==
- Muhal Richard Abrams – piano
