= Mossa Bildner =

Brazilian multi-disciplinary artist

Mossa Bildner is a Brazilian multi-disciplinary artist best known for vocal work with Henry Threadgill and for arranging the Colours of Ritual performances in New York City.

== Background ==
Bildner grew up in Rio de Janeiro where she was exposed to a wide variety of music. In her teens she attended Umbanda and Candomble ceremonies and formed a lifelong love of the Afro-Brazilian styles. Bildner studied Opera Performance at the Conservatorio Santa Cecilia in Rome, Italy, graduating in 1983. Her tutors included Yolanda Magnoni, Franco Mannino, and Luigi Ricci. She continued her vocal studies in London with Vera Rózsa and Robert Southerland, in Vienna with Tito Gobbi and Sena Jurinac, and at the Mozarteum in Salzburg. Bildner went on to perform at the English National Opera, Welsh National Opera, Scottish Opera, and elsewhere in Europe, including two years as a member at the Theater Augsburg. After arriving in New York in 1990, Henry Threadgill heard Bildner sing and invited her to record with his ensemble Very Very Circus. She appears on Too Much Sugar for a Dime (Axiom, 1993), Song Out of My Trees (Black Saint, 1993), and Carry the Day (Columbia, 1994) after which, with Threadgill's encouragement, she left the group to embark on her own projects.

== Harvest of my Tongue ==
Harvest of my Tongue is a 26-piece musical work, composed by Bildner, based on a poem Recueil des Mots de ma Langue by French artist Michele Blondel. It was first commissioned & performed in 1994 at the Fine Arts Center (Amherst, Massachusetts) retrospective of Blondel's work. Since then it has been performed at The Living Theatre and at the Brecht Forum, both in New York City.

== After the Storm ==
In 2012 Bildner recorded an improvisational album After The Storm (FMR) with British guitarist Philip Gibbs and vibraphonist/pianist Karl Berger. Bildner included readings of two poems by Dylan Thomas in her performance.

== Film ==
A short film A Vida É Estranha ("Life is Strange") that Bildner co-directed with Glauber Rocha premiered at the Curitiba International Film Festival in 2015. The film documents Rocha and Bildner's 1973 trip to Essaouira, a city in Morocco.

== Discography ==
With Henry Threadgill

- Too much sugar for a Dime (1993)
- Song out of my Trees (1994)
- Carry the Day (1995)

Other works

- After the Storm (FMR Records, 2013) with Karl Berger and Philip Gibbs
