= Creative Orchestra Music 1976 =

Studio album by Anthony Braxton
- Released: 1976
- Recorded: February 1976
- Genre: Jazz
- Length: 40:03
- Label: Arista
- Producer: Michael Cuscuna

Anthony Braxton chronology
Five Pieces 1975 (1975)	Creative Orchestra Music 1976 (1976)	Elements of Surprise (1976)

Creative Orchestra Music 1976 is an album by American jazz saxophonist and composer Anthony Braxton recorded in 1976 and released on the Arista label. The album was subsequently included on The Complete Arista Recordings of Anthony Braxton released by Mosaic Records in 2008.

== Reception ==
The AllMusic review by Scott Yanow awarded the album 4 stars, stating that "this is one of Braxton's most interesting recordings... There are quite a few memorable moments on this program."

Professional ratings
Review scores
Source	Rating
AllMusic	4/5 stars
The Encyclopedia of Popular Music	4/5 stars
The Rolling Stone Album Guide	5/5 stars
The Rolling Stone Jazz Record Guide	5/5 stars

== Track listing ==
All compositions by Anthony Braxton

1. "Piece 1" - 5:12
2. "Piece 2" - 7:37
3. "Piece 3" - 6:45
4. "Piece 4" - 6:28
5. "Piece 5" - 7:21
6. "Piece 6" - 6:40
- Recorded at Generation Sound Studios in New York in February 1976

The original titles of the pieces were cryptic diagrams with letters and numbers.

== Personnel ==
- Anthony Braxton - sopranino saxophone, alto saxophone, contrabass saxophone, clarinet, contrabass clarinet, flute
- Roscoe Mitchell - flute, soprano saxophone, alto saxophone, bass saxophone
- Seldon Powell - alto saxophone, clarinet, flute
- Ronald Bridgewater - clarinet, tenor saxophone
- Bruce Johnstone - bass clarinet, baritone saxophone
- Leo Smith - trumpet (tracks 2–5), conductor (tracks 1, 3 & 5)
- Cecil Bridgewater, Kenny Wheeler - trumpet
- Jon Faddis - trumpet, piccolo trumpet
- Garrett List, George E. Lewis - trombone
- Earl McIntyre, Jack Jeffers - bass trombone
- Jonathan Dorn - tuba
- Muhal Richard Abrams - piano (tracks 1, 2, 4 & 5), conductor (track 6)
- Frederic Rzewski - piano, bass drum
- Richard Teitelbaum - synthesizer
- Karl Berger - glockenspiel, vibraphone, xylophone, chimes
- Dave Holland - bass, cello
- Barry Altschul - snare drum, bells, chimes, gong, percussion
- Philip Wilson - cymbal, percussion
- Warren Smith - drums, tympani
