= Elements of Surprise =

Live album by Anthony Braxton and George Lewis
- Released: 1985
- Recorded: June 7, 1976; Moers Festival, Germany
- Genre: Jazz
- Length: 37:20
- Label: Moers Music momu 01036
- Producer: Burkhard Hennen

Anthony Braxton chronology
Creative Orchestra Music 1976 (1976)	Elements of Surprise (1985)	Duets 1976 (1976)

Elements of Surprise is a live album by saxophonist Anthony Braxton and trombonist George E. Lewis recorded at the Moers Festival in Germany in 1976 and originally released on the Moers Music label.

Professional ratings
Review scores
Source	Rating
Allmusic	3/5 stars

== Track listing ==
1. "Composition 64" (Anthony Braxton) - 9:50
2. "Ornithology" (Braxton/Charlie Parker) - 6:50
3. "Composition 65" (Braxton) - 2:19
4. "Music for Trombone and B♭ Soprano" (George Lewis) - 18:18

== Personnel ==
- Anthony Braxton - alto saxophone, soprano saxophone, clarinet
- George Lewis - trombone
