= The Circle of Time =

Studio album by Amina Claudine Myers
- Released: 1983
- Recorded: February 3 & 4, 1983
- Genre: Jazz
- Length: 44:18
- Label: Black Saint
- Producer: Giovanni Bonandrini

Amina Claudine Myers chronology
Salutes Bessie Smith (1980)	The Circle of Time (1983)	Jumping in the Sugar Bowl (1984)

The Circle of Time is the fourth album by American pianist Amina Claudine Myers, recorded in 1983 for the Italian Black Saint label.

== Reception ==
The AllMusic review by Michael G. Nastos stated: "Myers freely explores jazz, blues, and gospel-tinged creative music in her own inimitable way. All of these six pieces were written by Myers, each showcasing a different side of her joyous persona, making her music deep, listenable, tuneful, and emotional".

Professional ratings
Review scores
Source	Rating
AllMusic	4.5/5 stars
The Penguin Guide to Jazz Recordings	3.5/4 stars
The Rolling Stone Jazz Record Guide	4/5 stars

== Track listing ==
All compositions by Amina Claudine Myers

1. "Louisville" – 6:50
2. "Plowed Fields" – 7:08
3. "Do You Wanna Be Saved" – 8:13
4. "Christine" – 8:58
5. "The Clock" – 6:26
6. "The Circle of Time" – 6:43

- Recorded at Barigozzi Studio in Milano, Italy on February 3 & 4, 1983

== Personnel ==
- Amina Claudine Myers – piano, organ, harmonica, vocals
- Don Pate – bass, electric bass
- Thurman Barker – percussion
