= Solo Saxophone Concerts =

Live album by Roscoe Mitchell
- Released: 1974
- Recorded: October 22, 1973; November 2, 1973; July 12, 1974
- Venue: Kalamazoo, Michigan; Montreal; Pori International Jazz Festival, Finland
- Genre: Jazz
- Length: 40:23
- Label: Sackville
- Producer: Roscoe Mitchell, Onari Productions

Roscoe Mitchell chronology
Congliptious (1968)	Solo Saxophone Concerts (1974)	Roscoe Mitchell Quartet (1976)

Solo Saxophone Concerts is an album by American jazz saxophonist Roscoe Mitchell composed of solo concert performances from 1973 and 1974 and released on the Canadian Sackville label. It was reissued in 2009 by AECO/Katalyst under the title The Solo Concert.

== Reception ==
Professional ratings
Review scores
Source	Rating
AllMusic	4.5/5 stars
The Rolling Stone Jazz Record Guide	4/5 stars

In his review for AllMusic, Michael G. Nastos states "This is the first, greatest, and premier solo recording by Roscoe Mitchell that has to go down as one of his all-time best, and a prime example of how to stand alone, unafraid of any preconceived notions in how modern jazz should sound or be performed."

== Track listing ==
All compositions by Roscoe Mitchell except as indicated

1. "Nonaah" - 1:20
2. "Tutankamen" (Malachi Favors) - 7:00
3. "Enlorfe" - 2:54
4. "Jibbana" - 4:51
5. "Eeltwo (Part One)" - 2:53
6. "Eeltwo (Part Two)" - 6:23
7. "Oobina (Little Big Horn)" - 4:38
8. "Ttum" - 8:56
9. "Nonaah" - 1:28

== Personnel ==
- Roscoe Mitchell - soprano sax, alto sax, tenor sax, bass sax
