= Things to Come from Those Now Gone =

Studio album by Muhal Richard Abrams
- Released: 1975
- Recorded: October 10–11, 1972
- Studio: P.S. Recording Studios, Chicago
- Genre: Jazz
- Length: 34:43
- Label: Delmark; DS-430
- Producer: Robert G. Koester

Muhal Richard Abrams chronology
Young at Heart/Wise in Time (1970)	Things to Come from Those Now Gone (1975)	Afrisong (1975)

Things to Come from Those Now Gone is the third album by Muhal Richard Abrams which was released on the Delmark label in 1975 and features performances of seven of Abrams' compositions by Abrams with varying line-ups that include Wallace McMillan, Edwin Daugherty, Richard Brown, Emanuel Cranshaw, Reggie Willis, Rufus Reid, Steve McCall and Wilbur Campbell with vocals by Ella Jackson.

== Reception ==
The Allmusic review by Brian Olewnick calls the album "a hodgepodge of an album with varying combinations of musicians producing work that ranges from the weirdly bad to the astonishingly beautiful". The Penguin Guide to Jazz awarded the album 3½ stars, stating "Things to Come is a ringing assertion of Abram's lifelong belief that musical advancement can only be achieved by observing the lessons of tradition". The Rolling Stone Jazz Record Guide said "Things to Come from Those Now Gone captures Abrams and the AACM in the middle of this decade running the gamut between chamber ballads, hard bop, electronics, mock opera and high energy".

Professional ratings
Review scores
Source	Rating
Allmusic	3/5 stars
Penguin Guide to Jazz	3.5/4 stars
The Rolling Stone Jazz Record Guide	3/5 stars

== Track listing ==
All compositions by Muhal Richard Abrams

1. "Ballad for New Souls" - 4:39
2. "Things to Come from Those Now Gone" - 4:09
3. "How Are You?" - 4:41
4. "In Retrospect" - 3:49
5. "Ballad for Old Souls" - 5:58
6. "1 and 4 Plus 2 and 7" - 10:06
7. "March of the Transients" - 6:12

== Personnel ==
- Muhal Richard Abrams: piano
- Wallace McMillan: alto saxophone, flute (tracks 1, 2 & 7)
- Edwin Daugherty: alto saxophone, tenor saxophone (tracks 2 & 7)
- Richard Brown: tenor saxophone (track 4)
- Emanuel Cranshaw: vibraphone (tracks 3 & 5)
- Reggie Willis: bass (tracks 2 & 7)
- Rufus Reid: bass (tracks 3, 4 & 5)
- Steve McCall: drums (tracks 2 & 6)
- Wilbur Campbell: drums (tracks 2 & 7)
- Ella Jackson: vocals (track 3)
