= Streaming (album) =

Studio album by Muhal Richard Abrams/George Lewis/Roscoe Mitchell
- Released: October 10, 2006
- Recorded: January 8 & 9, 2005
- Genre: Jazz
- Label: Pi Recordings

Muhal Richard Abrams chronology
The Visibility of Thought (2001)	Streaming (2006)	Vision Towards Essence (2007)

Streaming is an album by Muhal Richard Abrams, George Lewis, and Roscoe Mitchell recorded in 2005 and released on the Pi Recordings label in 2006.

Prior to the session, the musicians had worked together since 1971, and had participated in the recording of albums such as Abrams's Spihumonesty, Mitchell's Nonaah, and Lewis's Shadowgraph. The recording came about as a result of the success of the trio's extended improvisation at the 2003 Venice Biennale.

Abrams described the album as "a vintage collaboration," and commented: "the respect that transpires between us on the stage, the respect for the improvised space that we use, is special. Of course, they're virtuoso musicians, but I'm talking about silence and activity, when to play and when not to play, just from instinct and feeling and respect."

== Reception ==
Professional ratings
Review scores
Source	Rating
AllMusic	3/5 stars
The Penguin Guide to Jazz	3.5/4 stars
All About Jazz	4/5 stars

The AllMusic review by Scott Yanow states that "Decades have passed since the debut of these three musicians, yet they have lost nothing of their musical curiosity and desire to take risks. The enthusiastic interaction between pianist Muhal Richard Abrams and saxophonist Roscoe Mitchell with Lewis is the real reward of this esoteric outing".

The authors of The Penguin Guide to Jazz noted that there were no discussions or preparations before the recording and that, with the exception of "Scrape", the performances showed a high level of interaction and empathy.

In an article for The New York Times, Nate Chinen wrote: "Three masters of structural abstraction at the height of their powers. This studio recording is a study in texture, not only for the percussive elocutions of Mr. Abrams and Mr. Mitchell but also for the improvised electronic commentary of Mr. Lewis, on a laptop computer."

Jason Bivins, writing for Dusted Magazine, commented: "This set of five free improvisations... is wonderfully rich and varied... I'm confident it's one of the best jazz/improv records of 2006. In fact, I would confidently cite it as evidence that jazz – whatever we mean by that maligned term – is alive and thriving. Fantastic music."

Critic and author Howard Mandel wrote: "Streaming... projects a cinematic excursion through improvisations, casting motifs... together so as to excite a reconsideration of the basic ways we organize sounds into music. Their work encourages us to abandon questions of what pitches harmonize and how different rhythms intersect for matters relating to sonic scale, to foreground and field, to the conjunction of non-associative elements and the role listeners play in pulling disparate noise into meaningful music."

== Track listing ==
1. "Scrape" - 10:02
2. "Bound" - 11:02
3. "Dramaturns" - 18:27
4. "Soundhear" - 16:36
5. "Streaming" - 17:34

All compositions by Muhal Richard Abrams, George Lewis and Roscoe Mitchell

== Personnel ==
- Muhal Richard Abrams: piano, percussion
- George Lewis: trombone, laptop
- Roscoe Mitchell: saxophones, percussion
