= Poems for Piano: The Piano Music of Marion Brown =

Studio album by Amina Claudine Myers
- Released: 1979
- Recorded: July 26, 1979
- Genre: Jazz
- Length: 51:31
- Label: Sweet Earth

Amina Claudine Myers chronology
Poems for Piano: The Piano Music of Marion Brown (1979)	Song for Mother E (1980)

Poems for Piano: The Piano Music of Marion Brown is the debut album by American pianist Amina Claudine Myers featuring performances recorded in 1979 for the Sweet Earth label.

== Reception ==
The Allmusic review by Brian Olewnick awarded the album 4 stars, stating: "Poems for Piano is a superb recording, offering abundant evidence of both Marion Brown's deep and sensitive compositional gifts and Amina Claudine Myers' all-too-unrecognized strengths as a player and interpreter. Highly recommended".

Professional ratings
Review scores
Source	Rating
Allmusic	4/5 stars

== Track listing ==
All compositions by Marion Brown except as indicated

1. "Sweet Earth Flying" - 10:00
2. "November Cotton Flower" - 9:08
3. "Evening Song" - 7:57
4. "Sunday Comedown" - 9:18
5. "Golden Lady in the Graham Cracker Window" - 5:00
6. "Sienna Maimoun" - 4:00
7. "Going Home" (Amina Claudine Myers) - 6:08

- Recorded at Vanguard Studios in New York City on July 26, 1979

== Personnel ==
- Amina Claudine Myers - piano
