= Alone, Together, Apart =

Live album by Jerome Cooper and Thomas Buckner
- Released: 2003
- Recorded: April 27, 2002
- Venue: Lotus Music and Dance Studio, New York City
- Genre: Free jazz
- Label: Mutable Music; 17509-2

Jerome Cooper chronology
In Concert: From There to Hear (2001)	Alone, Together, Apart (2003)	A Magical Approach (2010)

Alone, Together, Apart is a live album by percussionist Jerome Cooper and vocalist Thomas Buckner. It was recorded in April 2002 at Lotus Music and Dance Studio in New York City, and was released by Mutable Music in 2003.

== Reception ==
Professional ratings
Review scores
Source	Rating
AllMusic	4/5 stars
The Penguin Guide to Jazz Recordings	2.5/4 stars

In a review for AllMusic, Glenn Astarita wrote: "Buckner's wordless vocals complement Cooper's keenly constructed percussion motifs and EFX based treatments... the musicians paint lucid canvasses, awash with imaginary voyages as they morph lesser-known musical terrains into idealized statements... they sustain a great deal of interest throughout these lengthy pieces... the musicians pursue elusive frameworks along with textural components that often allude to subversive shifts in strategy. No doubt, this is fascinating stuff!"

Ken Waxman, writing for All About Jazz, commented: "Buckner, using his full-spectrum voice, and Cooper, on a variety of percussion instruments, approach the four spontaneous improvisations with the same aplomb as if they were respectively vocalizing an early music motet or playing a straight jazz tune... The duo's work... suggests pygmy chanting, speaking-in-tongues, animal cries and mysterious Indo-European word play on the vocal side, while Cooper flits from sock cymbal to bass drum to electric keyboard used both as electric piano and synthesized strings for more expansion coloration."

In an article for Signal to Noise, Pat Buzby stated: "Cooper's playing here stands out for its uniquely light but driving touch... Buckner's voice... delves into low groans, high cries and semi-operatic stylings, but steers clear of harshness. This is meditative music... Avoiding poking and prodding, Cooper and Buckner work alongside one another patiently, on the same wavelength."

== Track listing ==
All compositions by Jerome Cooper and Thomas Buckner.

1. "Evocation" – 24:48
2. "Journey" – 8:46
3. "Return" – 16:22
4. "All Out" – 4:05

== Personnel ==
- Jerome Cooper – drum set, tonal rhythmic activator, bass drum, dumbek, sock cymbal, cymbals, balaphone, floor tom-tom, keyboard
- Thomas Buckner – voice
