= Duets 1976 =

Studio album by Anthony Braxton with Muhal Richard Abrams
- Released: 1976
- Recorded: August 1–2, 1976
- Studios: Bearsville Sound Studios, Woodstock, NY
- Genre: Jazz
- Length: 41:36
- Label: Arista AL 4101
- Producer: Michael Cuscuna

Anthony Braxton chronology
Elements of Surprise (1976)	Duets 1976 (1976)	Time Zones (1976)

Duets 1976 is an album by saxophonist and composer Anthony Braxton with pianist Muhal Richard Abrams recorded in 1976 and released on the Arista label. The album features three compositions by Braxton, two jazz standards and one improvisation and was subsequently included on The Complete Arista Recordings of Anthony Braxton released by Mosaic Records in 2008.

== Reception ==
Professional ratings
Review scores
Source	Rating
AllMusic	2/5 stars
DownBeat	4/5 stars
The Rolling Stone Jazz Record Guide	4/5 stars

The AllMusic review by Brian Olewnick states "The results are mixed, with a somewhat ragged approach balanced by enthusiastic playing and an intriguing choice of material".

== Track listing ==
All compositions by Anthony Braxton except where noted.

1. "Miss Ann" (Eric Dolphy) - 4:10
2. "Composition 60: 37 78 64" - 10:21
3. "Composition 40P: 327 04M" - 7:02
4. "Maple Leaf Rag" (Scott Joplin) - 3:38
5. "Composition 62: 36 MK-74 128" - 13:13
6. "Nickie" (Muhal Richard Abrams, Anthony Braxton) - 3:12

== Personnel ==
- Anthony Braxton - clarinet, E-flat clarinet, contrabass clarinet, sopranino saxophone, alto saxophone, contrabass saxophone
- Muhal Richard Abrams - piano
