= Carry the Day =

Studio album by Henry Threadgill
- Released: 1995
- Recorded: 1995
- Genre: Jazz
- Length: 33:34
- Label: Columbia
- Producer: Bill Laswell

Henry Threadgill chronology
Song Out of My Trees (1994)	Carry the Day (1995)	Makin' a Move (1995)

Carry the Day is an album by Henry Threadgill released on the Columbia label in 1995. The album features six of Threadgill's compositions performed by Threadgill's Very Very Circus with guest artists.

== Reception ==
Professional ratings
Review scores
Source	Rating
Allmusic	4.5/5 stars
Los Angeles Times	2.5/4 stars
The Penguin Guide to Jazz on CD	4/4 stars

Allmusic awarded the album 4½ stars and the review by Scott Yanow stated "This unique music takes several listens to absorb and even then it still might be somewhat incomprehensible".

In the Los Angeles Times Don Heckman wrote, "if you’d like to sample the work of a composer-saxophonist who has consistently stretched the outer limits of jazz (even if he doesn’t care to have the word applied to his music), here’s a perfect opportunity ... It all sounds very sudden, spontaneous and random, which probably pleases Threadgill greatly. Among his many other accomplishments, the one that is most apparent in this creatively demanding album is the capacity to compose music that possesses the impetuous, unexpected energy of an improvised solo".

People said "Henry Threadgill’s music has always been an anomaly, but over the years, the eclectic composer-saxophonist has produced some beautiful and wildly original music. This is true once again with Carry the Day, Threadgill’s first release on a major label ... this is an impressive album by an innovative, important musician who takes chances but never loses his integrity—or his wit".

In The Penguin Guide to Jazz on CD, Morton and Cook called the album "dizzyingly wonderful. Threadgill throws together disparate elements with a master surrealist's touch...Almost every track sounds as if poised on the brink of entropic noise yet [he] manages to pull it all together and save the day."

== Track listing ==
All compositions by Henry Threadgill.

1. "Come Carry the Day" – 6:06
2. "Growing a Big Banana" – 3:26
3. "Vivjanrondirkski" – 5:55
4. "Between Orchids Lilies Blind Eyes and Cricket" – 7:45
5. "Hyla Crucifer... Silence Of" – 6:09
6. "Jenkins Boys Again, Wish Somebody Die, It's Hot" – 7:39

== Personnel ==
- Henry Threadgill – alto saxophone, flute, baritone flute
- Mark Taylor – french horn
- Brandon Ross – electric guitar, soprano guitar
- Masujaa – electric guitar
- Edwin Rodriguez, Marcus Rojas – tuba
- Gene Lake – drums

On tracks 1, 3 & 5

- Wu Man – pipa
- Tony Cedras – accordion
- Jason Hwang – violin
- Johnny Rudas, Miguel Urbina – percussion, vocals
- Sentienla Toy – vocals (tracks 3 & 5)
- Mossa Bildner – vocals (track 5)
