= Rejoicing with the Light =

Studio album by Muhal Richard Abrams
- Released: 1983
- Recorded: January 8–25, 1983
- Genre: Jazz
- Length: 41:12
- Label: Black Saint
- Producer: Giovanni Bonandrini

Muhal Richard Abrams chronology
Blues Forever (1982)	Rejoicing with the Light (1983)	View from Within (1984)

Rejoicing with the Light is an album by Muhal Richard Abrams. It was released on the Italian Black Saint label in 1983 and features performances of five of Abrams' compositions by a fourteen-member orchestra.

== Reception ==
Professional ratings
Review scores
Source	Rating
AllMusic	4.5/5 stars
The Penguin Guide to Jazz	3/4 stars

The AllMusic review by Ron Wynn states: "He led the orchestra through pieces that were sometimes introspective and other times jubilant and swinging, but never simple or predictable. This session was a challenging, instructive, and entertaining lesson in modern big band writing, arranging and performing". The Penguin Guide to Jazz awarded the album 3 stars stating "These albums seem even more compelling now than they did when they first came out, because it is clear where the leader's ideas are going".

== Track listing ==
All compositions by Muhal Richard Abrams

1. "The Heart Is Love and "I Am"" - 10:25
2. "Blessed Be the Heavens at 12" - 9:33
3. "Bloodline" - 7:54
4. "Rejoicing with the Light" - 8:42
5. "Spiral to Clarity" - 4:38

== Personnel ==
- Muhal Richard Abrams: piano, conductor
- Janette Moody: soprano voice
- Warren Smith: percussion, timbales, vibraphone
- John Purcell: clarinet, bass clarinet, piccolo, alto saxophone, oboe, flute
- Jean-Paul Bourelly: guitar
- Vincent Chancey: french Horn
- Eugene Ghee: clarinet, bass clarinet, tenor saxophone
- Patience Higgins: clarinet, alto clarinet, baritone saxophone
- Marty Ehrlich: clarinet, alto saxophone, bass clarinet, flute
- Craig Harris: trombone
- Baikida Carroll: trumpet, flugelhorn
- Howard Johnson: tuba, baritone saxophone, contrabass clarinet
- Abdul Wadud: cello
- Rick Rozie: bass
- Andrew Cyrille: drums
