= Tony Cedras =

South African musician (died 2024)

- Born: 1952
- Occupation(s): Musician, Television actor

Tony Cedras (c. 1952 – 29 January 2024) was a South African accordion, harmonium, keyboard and guitar player. He was born in Elsie's River, Cape Province, Union of South Africa in circa 1952. He performed or recorded, most often on accordion, with various well-known artists, including Paul Simon, Harry Belafonte, Miriam Makeba, Henry Threadgill, Muhal Richard Abrams, Cassandra Wilson, Hugh Masekela, Tony Bird and Gigi.

Cedras got his first professional break under the tutorship of Pacific Express bass player, Paul Abrahams. He was drafted into the band as a trumpet player and keyboard player. He was in every lineup of Paul Simon's band from 1987 to 2012, despite never featuring on a studio recording with Simon.

Cedras died on 29 January 2024, at the age of 71.

== Discography ==
With Pharoah Sanders

- Save Our Children (Verve, 1998)

With Henry Threadgill

- Song Out of My Trees
- Carry the Day (Columbia, 1995)
- Where's Your Cup?

With Cassandra Wilson

- Blue Light 'til Dawn
- New Moon Daughter
