= Colors in Thirty-Third =

Studio album by Muhal Richard Abrams
- Released: 1987
- Recorded: 19 December 1986
- Genre: Jazz
- Length: 41:05
- Label: Black Saint
- Producer: Giovanni Bonandrini

Muhal Richard Abrams chronology
Roots of Blue (1986)	Colors in Thirty-Third (1987)	The Hearinga Suite (1989)

Colors in Thirty-Third is an album by Muhal Richard Abrams released on the Italian Black Saint label in 1987 and featuring performances of seven of Abrams' compositions by Abrams, John Blake, John Purcell, Dave Holland, Fred Hopkins and Andrew Cyrille.

== Reception ==
The Allmusic review awarded the album 4 stars stating "Muhal Richard Abrams constantly varied the lineups on the seven numbers that comprised this 1986 session, alternating between trio, quartet, quintet and sextet pieces... Abrams as usual was an inspiring force as an instrumentalist and conceptualist". The Penguin Guide to Jazz awarded the album 3 stars stating "This might be thought to be Purcell's finest hour, but everyone contributes. The basic personnel divides into trio, quartet, quintet, and for the title piece and the significantly named "Introspection"; full sextet".

Professional ratings
Review scores
Source	Rating
Allmusic	4/5 stars
The Penguin Guide to Jazz	3/4 stars

== Track listing ==
All compositions by Muhal Richard Abrams

1. "Drumman Cyrille" - 6:03
2. "Miss Richarda" - 5:48
3. "Munktmunk" - 6:25
4. "Soprano Song" - 6:06
5. "Piano-Cello Song" - 8:34
6. "Colors in Thirty-Third" - 6:37
7. "Introspection" - 6:28
- Recorded December 19, 1986 at Sound Ideas Studio, New York City

== Personnel ==
- Muhal Richard Abrams - piano
- John Blake (tracks 4, 6 & 7) - violin
- John Purcell - soprano saxophone, bass clarinet, tenor saxophone
- Dave Holland (tracks 5, 6 & 7) - bass, cello
- Fred Hopkins - bass
- Andrew Cyrille (all except track 2) - drums
