= 8 O'Clock: Two Improvisations =

Studio album by Roscoe Mitchell & Thomas Buckner
- Released: 2001
- Recorded: December 15, 2000
- Studio: Systems 2, Brooklyn NY
- Genre: Jazz
- Length: 65:35
- Label: Mutable Music; 17505-2

Roscoe Mitchell chronology
In Walked Buckner (1999)	8 O'Clock: Two Improvisations (2001)	Song for My Sister (2002)

8 O'Clock: Two Improvisations is an album by American saxophonist Roscoe Mitchell and vocalist Thomas Buckner which was recorded in 2000 and released on Mutable Music the following year.

== Reception ==
Professional ratings
Review scores
Source	Rating
AllMusic	2.5/5 stars
The Penguin Guide to Jazz Recordings	3/4 stars

In his review for AllMusic, François Couture states:

The first improvisation lasts 45 minutes, the second a little over 20 minutes. Both focus on the deep understanding existing between the two improvisers. The music never escalates -- it remains calm, delicate, and almost restrained at times. The second improv follows an even sparser mood. Listeners will be more used to Mitchell's horn playing, but the time he spends on small percussion instruments is welcomed: it brings a change of pace and triggers a new set of inflections from Buckner. The performance lacks some involvement but remains enjoyable throughout

— Couture, François. Thomas Buckner / Roscoe Mitchell – 8 O'Clock: Two Improvisations: Review at AllMusic. Retrieved January 2, 2018.

== Track listing ==
All compositions by Roscoe Mitchell and Thomas Buckner

1. "Improvisation 1: VPF" – 7:41
2. "Improvisation 1: VSP" – 11:10
3. "Improvisation 1: VS" – 8:38
4. "Improvisation 1: VFPSA" – 17:18
5. "Improvisation 2: VAP" – 12:57
6. "Improvisation 2: VPA" – 7:38

== Personnel ==
- Roscoe Mitchell - soprano saxophone, alto saxophone, flute, percussion
- Thomas Buckner – voice
