= Roots of Blue =

Studio album by Muhal Richard Abrams
- Released: 1986
- Recorded: January 7, 1986
- Genre: Jazz
- Label: RPR

Muhal Richard Abrams chronology
View from Within (1984)	Roots of Blue (1986)	Colors in Thirty-Third (1987)

Cecil McBee chronology
Flying Out (1982)	Roots of Blue (1986)	Unspoken (1997)

Professional ratings
Review scores
Source	Rating
Allmusic	2.5/5 stars

Roots of Blue is an album of duets by Muhal Richard Abrams and Cecil McBee released on the RPR label in 1986.

== Reception ==
The Allmusic review by Brian Olewnick states "Abrams' tendency toward light, single-note runs seems to require more of a weighty counterbalance than McBee offers. Only the title track, a relaxed, languid blues, rises to the level that the listener expects given the caliber of the musicians at hand".

== Track listing ==
All compositions by Muhal Richard Abrams except as indicated

1. "Time into Space into Time" (Muhal Richard Abrams, Jason Moran) - 5:47
2. "C.C.'s World" - 7:10
3. "Metamor" - 8:15
4. "Roots of Blue" - 9:00
5. "Direflex" - 9:51

== Personnel ==
- Muhal Richard Abrams: piano
- Cecil McBee: bass
