= The Visibility of Thought =

Studio album by Muhal Richard Abrams
- Released: 2001
- Recorded: August & December 2000
- Genre: Contemporary classical music
- Length: 72:15
- Label: Mutable Music
- Producer: Muhal Richard Abrams

Muhal Richard Abrams chronology
| The Open Air Meeting (1997) | The Visibility of Thought (2001) | Streaming (2002) |

The Visibility of Thought is an album of contemporary classical compositions by Muhal Richard Abrams performed by various ensembles which was released on the Mutable Music label in 2001. The album features performances by Abrams, Jon Deak, Joseph Kubera, Mark Feldman, Thomas Buckner, the string quartet ETHEL and Phillip Bush.

== Reception ==
Professional ratings
Review scores
| Source | Rating |
|---|---|
| AllMusic | 2.5/5 stars |
| The Penguin Guide to Jazz | 3/4 stars |

The AllMusic review by François Couture states "Abrams' writing is not without its moments, but it is unlikely that it will overshadow his recognition as a free jazz pianist". The Penguin Guide to Jazz awarded the album 3 stars stating "This is a curious record, not because it 'isn't jazz' but because it seems to touch too many sylistic dimensions at once".

== Track listing ==
All compositions by Muhal Richard Abrams

1. "Duet for Contrabass and Piano" - 6:01
2. "Duet for Violin and Piano" - 10:01
3. "Baritone Voice and String Quartet" - 10:38
4. "Piano Duet #1" - 10:48
5. "The Visibility of Thought" - 5:14
6. "Piano Improvisation" - 29:05
- Recorded at Systems Two in Brooklyn, New York, in August and December, 2000

== Personnel ==
- Muhal Richard Abrams: piano, synthesizer, computer, sequencer (tracks 5 & 6)
- Jon Deak: contrabass (track 1)
- Joseph Kubera: piano (tracks 1, 2 & 4)
- Mark Feldman: violin (track 2)
- Thomas Buckner: baritone (track 3)
- ETHEL: Ralph Farris, viola; Dorothy Lawson, cello; Todd Reynolds, violin; Mary Rowell, violin (track 3)
- Phillip Bush: piano (track 4)
