= Sightsong =

Studio album by Muhal Richard Abrams & Malachi Favors
- Released: 1976
- Recorded: October 13 & 14 1975
- Genre: Jazz
- Length: 39:47
- Label: Black Saint
- Producer: Giacomo Pellicciotti

Muhal Richard Abrams chronology
Afrisong (1975)	Sightsong (1976)	1-OQA+19 (1978)

Sightsong is an album by Muhal Richard Abrams and Malachi Favors which was released on the Italian Black Saint label in 1976.

== Reception ==
Professional ratings
Review scores
Source	Rating
AllMusic	4.5/5 stars
The Rolling Stone Jazz Record Guide	4/5 stars
The Penguin Guide to Jazz	3/4 stars

The AllMusic review by Brian Olewnick calls the album "one of Abrams's finest recordings and is also perhaps the best showcase for Malachi Favors' talents outside of his seminal work with the Art Ensemble of Chicago".The Rolling Stone Jazz Record Guide called the album "a more successful survey from 1975 with Art Ensemble bassist Malachi Favors along to help Abrams explore the AACM's roots".

The authors of the Penguin Guide to Jazz Recordings called the album "a perfect example of the radical/traditionalist ethos Abrams has done so much to foster."

== Track listing ==
All compositions by Muhal Richard Abrams except as indicated

1. "W.W. (Dedicated to Wilbur Ware)" - 4:57
2. "J.G. (Dedicated to Johnny Griffin)" - 5:35
3. "Sightsong" - 6:18
4. "Two over One" - 6:16
5. "Way Way Way Down Yonder" (Malachi Favors) - 5:28
6. "Panorama" - 5:59
7. "Unitry (Dedicated to the AACM)" - 5:14

== Personnel ==
- Muhal Richard Abrams: piano
- Malachi Favors: bass
