= The Open Air Meeting =

Live album by Muhal Richard Abrams
- Released: 1997
- Recorded: August 11, 1996
- Genre: Jazz
- Length: 57:53
- Label: New World
- Producer: Muhal Richard Abrams

Muhal Richard Abrams chronology
One Line, Two Views (1995)	The Open Air Meeting (1997)	The Visibility of Thought (2001)

Professional ratings
Review scores
Source	Rating
Allmusic	4/5 stars

The Open Air Meeting is a live album by Muhal Richard Abrams and Marty Ehrlich which was released on the New World label in 1997 and features duet performances by Abrams and Erlich recorded in August 1996 at the Brooklyn Museum.

== Reception ==
The Allmusic review by Scott Yanow states "The two musicians listen closely to each other and react quickly to any ideas that the other might have. Abrams' strong technique and knowledge of other styles and Ehrlich's versatile playing prove to be a stimulating match".

== Track listing ==
1. "Marching With Honor" (Muhal Richard Abrams) - 10:55
2. "Dark Sestina" (Marty Ehrlich) - 8:31
3. "Crossbeams" (Abrams) - 7:34
4. "The Price of the Ticket" (Ehrlich) - 13:54
5. "Bright Canto" (Ehrlich) - 12:04
6. "Blues to You" (Abrams, Ehrlich) - 4:55
- Recorded live as part of the concert series "Summer Jazz at The Brooklyn Museum: Double Exposure," August 11, 1996.

== Personnel ==
- Muhal Richard Abrams: piano
- Marty Ehrlich: alto saxophone, clarinet
