= Song for Mother E =

Studio album by Amina Claudine Myers
- Released: 1980
- Recorded: October 9, 1979
- Genre: Jazz
- Length: 46:38
- Label: Leo

Amina Claudine Myers chronology
Poems for Piano: The Piano Music of Marion Brown (1979)	Song for Mother E (1980)	Salutes Bessie Smith (1980)

Song for Mother E is the second album by American pianist Amina Claudine Myers featuring performances recorded in 1979 for the Leo label.

== Reception ==
The Allmusic review by Michael G. Nastos awarded the album 4 1/2 stars stating "Sounds like a bigger group. Excellent".

Professional ratings
Review scores
Source	Rating
Allmusic	4.5/5 stars
The Rolling Stone Jazz Record Guide	4/5 stars

== Track listing ==
All compositions by Amina Claudine Myers

1. "I'm Not Afraid" - 4:42
2. "3/4 Of 4/4" - 5:15
3. "Have Mercy Upon Us / Chant" - 10:50
4. "Song For Mother E" - 3:40
5. "The Real Side" - 5:50
6. "The Immortal" - 5:36
7. "Inner Destruction" - 7:36
8. "I'm Not Afraid, Refrain" - 3:09

- Recorded at Big Apple Recording Studios in New York City on October 9, 1979

== Personnel ==
- Amina Claudine Myers - piano, organ, giggle stick, voice
- Pheeroan akLaff - drums, gong, little instruments, voice
