= Levels and Degrees of Light =

Studio album by Muhal Richard Abrams
- Released: 1968
- Recorded: June 7 and December 21, 1967
- Studio: Sound Studios (Chicago); Ter Mar (Chicago)
- Genre: Jazz
- Length: 43:16
- Label: Delmark; DS-413
- Producer: Robert G. Koester

Muhal Richard Abrams chronology
Levels and Degrees of Light (1968)	Young at Heart/Wise in Time (1974)

Levels and Degrees of Light is the debut album by Muhal Richard Abrams which was released on the Delmark label in 1968 and features performances of three of Abrams' compositions by Abrams, Anthony Braxton, Leroy Jenkins, Charles Clark, Gordon Emmanuel, Maurice McIntyre, Thurman Barker and Leonard Jones with vocals by Penelope Taylor and a poetry recitation by David Moore.

== Reception ==
Professional ratings
Review scores
Source	Rating
Allmusic	4.5/5 stars
The Penguin Guide to Jazz	3/4 stars
The Rolling Stone Jazz Record Guide	3/5 stars

The Allmusic review by Brian Olewnick calling it "a landmark album that launched the first in a long line of beautiful, musical salvos from the AACM toward the mainstream jazz world... This is a milestone recording and belongs in the collection of any modern jazz fan". The Penguin Guide to Jazz awarded the album 3 stars stating "Levels and Degrees of Light would be a slightly difficult record to place in a blindfold test. It is certainly not untypical of the Chicago experimentation of the period, except it seems much less chaotic, much more responsive to European tradition". The Rolling Stone Jazz Record Guide said the album "features an intriguing first side with wordless vocal and several AACM stalwarts...but falls apart in the poorly recorded wall of sound that covers side two".

== Track listing ==
All compositions by Muhal Richard Abrams except as indicated

1. "Levels and Degrees of Light" - 10:33
2. "The Bird Song" (Abrams, David Moore) - 23:00
3. "My Thoughts Are My Future - Now and Forever" - 9:43

== Personnel ==
- Muhal Richard Abrams: piano, clarinet
- Anthony Braxton: alto saxophone
- Maurice McIntyre: tenor saxophone
- Leroy Jenkins: violin
- Gordon Emmanuel: vibraphone
- Charles Clark: bass
- Leonard Jones: bass
- Thurman Barker: drums
- Penelope Taylor: vocals
- David Moore: poet (track 2)
