= Moers Festival =

Annual international music festival in Moers, Germany

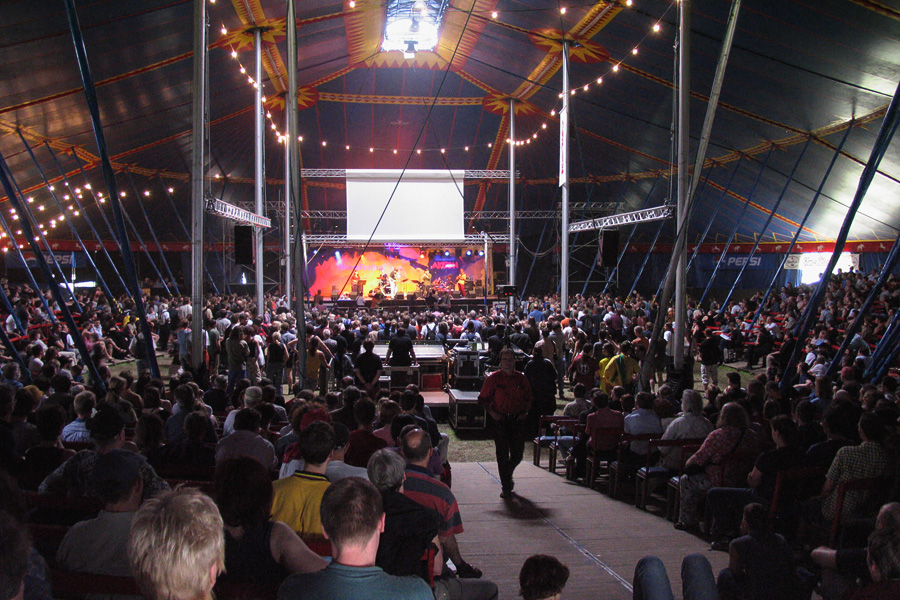
- 2004
- Genre: Jazz
- Dates: Whitsun
- Location: Moers, Germany
- Coordinates: 51°27′33″N 6°37′11″E
- Years active: 1972–present
- Founders: Burkhard Hennen
- Attendance: 40,000
- Website: moers-festival.de/en

The Moers Festival is an annual international music festival in Moers, Germany. The festival has changed from concentrating on free jazz to including world and pop music, though it still invites many avant-garde jazz musicians. Performers at Moers include Lester Bowie, Fred Frith, Jan Garbarek, Herbie Hancock, Abdullah Ibrahim, David Murray, Sun Ra, Archie Shepp, and Cecil Taylor. The festival is officially named "mœrs festival" with lowercase letters.

== History ==
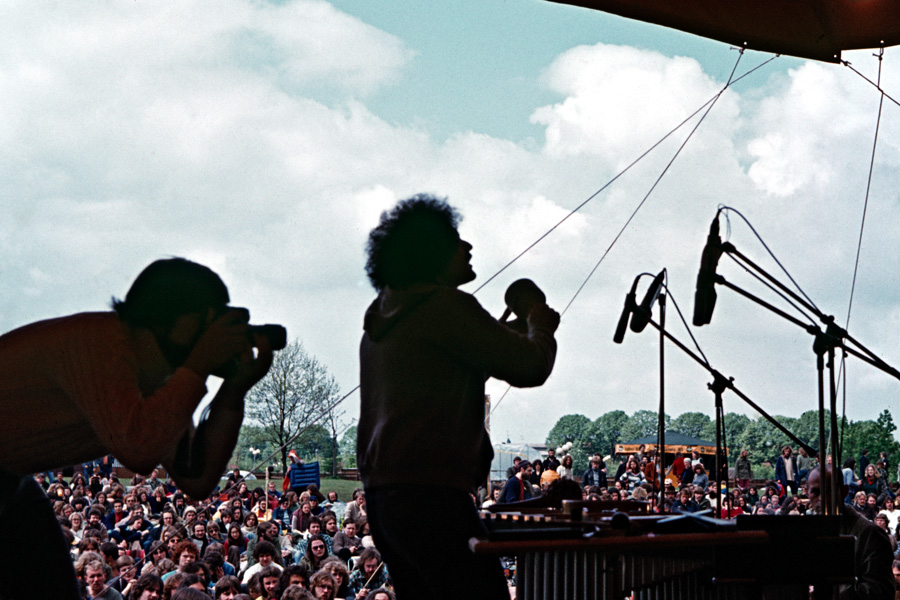
In 1978 the International New Jazz Festival Moers took place outdoors. (picture David Friedman)

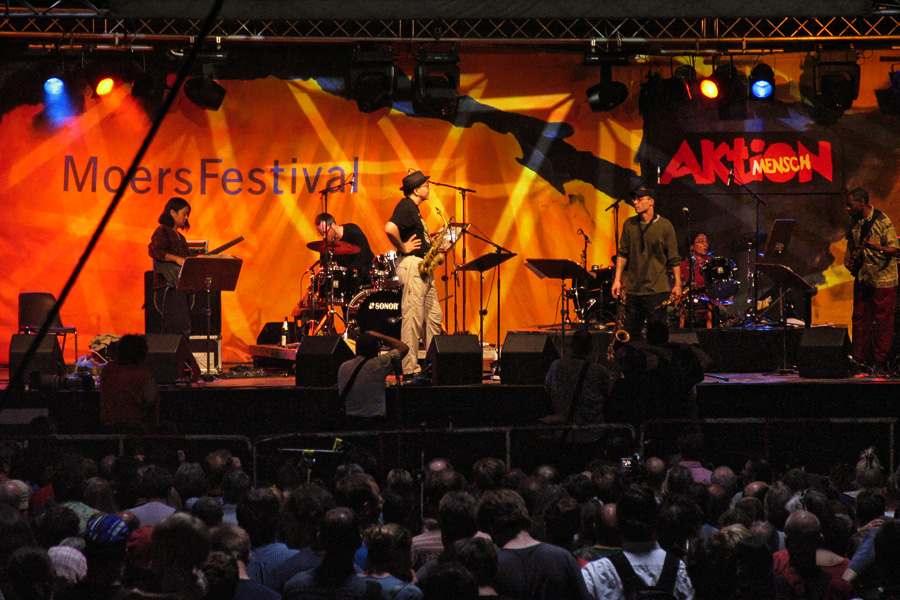
On stage Ned Rothenberg Double Band, 2004

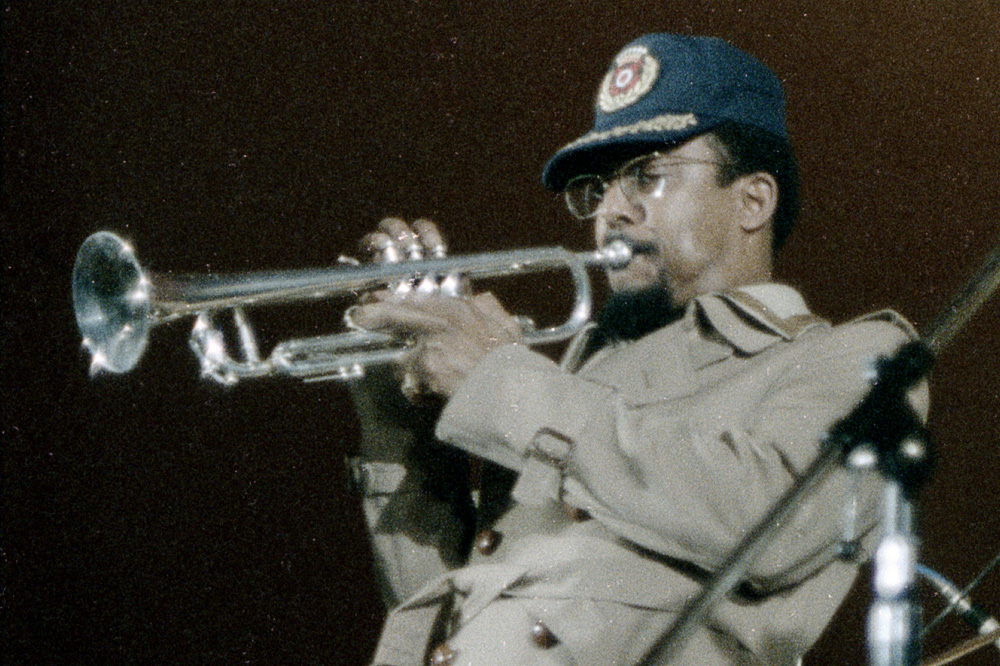
Lester Bowie, New Jazz Festival Moers (Moers Festival), 1978

The festival was founded in 1971 by Burkhard Hennen. Three years later, he formed Moers Music to sell performances recorded at the festival.

In the early years the festival took place in the paved yard of the castle. In 1975 it was moved to a nearby park because of increased attendance. After a few years outdoors, it moved to a large venue. African Dance Night was added in 1985. Musicians such as Mory Kanté, Salif Keita, Cheb Mami, and Youssou N'Dour played there. After the artistic director changed in 2005, the event was discontinued. In 2005, after 34 years as artistic director, Hennen handed the job to Reiner Michalke. After Michalke, the position went to Tim Isfort, a musician who grew up in Moers.

Due to financial problems in the 2000s, the festival was reduced to three days.

== Selected discography ==
- 1974: Anthony Braxton – Solo: Live at Moers Festival
- 1974: Anthony Braxton – Quartet: Live at Moers Festival
- 1974: Frank Wright Quartet - Unity
- 1976: Anthony Braxton and George E. Lewis – Elements of Surprise
- 1976: John Surman – Live at Moers Festival
- 1977: World Saxophone Quartet – Point of No Return
- 1978: Phillip Wilson Quartet – Live at Moers Festival
- 1978: Wadada Leo Smith – The Mass on the World
- 1979: David Murray/Sunny Murray Trio – Live at Moers
- 1987: Reichlich Weiblich – Live at Moers Festival 87
- 1993: Jamaaladeen Tacuma with Basso Nouveau – The Night of Chamber Music
- 1993: Richard Teitelbaum – Cyberband
- 2005: James Choice Orchestra – Live at Moers
- 2018: Sebastian Gramss' States of Play - Live at Moers Festival (vinyl)
