= Thomas Buckner =

American opera singer (born 1941)

Thomas Buckner (born 1941) is an American baritone vocalist specializing in the performance of contemporary classical music and improvised music. In his work, he utilizes a wide range of extended (non-traditional) vocal techniques.

Buckner also works as a concert promoter; in Berkeley, California, he founded the 1750 Arch Concerts, which presented over 100 musical events per year for eight years. He also founded the record label 1750 Arch Records, which released more than 50 LPs. Also in Berkeley, he co-led the 23-member Arch Ensemble with composer Robert Hughes. He operates the record label Mutable Music.

== Life and career ==
Buckner is a grandson of International Business Machines founder Thomas J. Watson, Sr. In the early 1970s, while his uncle John N. Irwin, II served as the U.S. Ambassador to France, Buckner was one of approximately 500 left-leaning Americans on Richard Nixon's so-called "enemies list."

He grew up in Westchester County, New York, and has lived in New York City since 1983. His wife is the bharatanatyam dancer Kamala Cesar, whom he married in 1992. He is the brother of painter Walker Buckner and children's advocate Elizabeth Buckner.

Buckner is an alumnus of the Music Academy of the West, where he attended in 1970.

== Discography ==
With Muhal Richard Abrams

- The Visibility of Thought (Mutable, 2001)

With Jerome Cooper

- Alone, Together, Apart (Mutable, 2003)

With Roscoe Mitchell

- 8 O'Clock: Two Improvisations (Mutable, 2001)
- Numbers (RogueArt, 2011)
