= Environment =

Environment most often refers to:

- Natural environment, all living and non-living things occurring naturally that impact any organism or group of organisms

== Other physical and cultural environments ==
- Ecology, the study of the relations of organisms to one another and to their physical surroundings
- Environment (systems), the surroundings of a physical system that may interact with the system by exchanging mass, energy, or other properties
- Built environment, constructed surroundings that provide the settings for human activity, ranging from the large-scale civic surroundings to the personal places
- Social environment, the culture that an individual lives in, and the people and institutions with whom they interact
- Market environment, business term

== Arts, entertainment and publishing ==
- Environment (magazine), a peer-reviewed, popular environmental science publication founded in 1958
- Environment (1917 film), 1917 American silent film
- Environment (1922 film), 1922 American silent film
- Environment (1927 film), 1927 Australian silent film
- Environments (album series), a series of LPs, cassettes and CDs depicting natural sounds
- Environments (album), 2007, by The Future Sound of London
- "Environment", a song by Dave from Psychodrama.
- Environments (journal), a scientific journal

== In computing ==
- Environment (type theory), the association between variable names and data types in type theory
- Deployment environment, in software deployment, a computer system in which a computer program or software component is deployed and executed
- Runtime environment, a virtual machine state which provides software services for processes or programs while a computer is running
- Environment variable, a variable capable of affecting the way processes behave on a computer

== See also ==
- Environmentalism, a broad philosophy, ideology, and social movement regarding concerns for environmental protection
- Environmental disease
- Environmental health
- Environmental science
- Environmental history of the United States
- Environmental Issues, disruptions in the usual function of ecosystems
