= Environ (Loft) =

Performance space influential during Loft Jazz scene of NYC mid-1970s

Coordinates: 40.7213°N 74.0000°W

Environ was a performance space that was influential during the Loft Jazz scene of the mid-1970s in NYC. It was located on Broadway in SOHO and close to two other noted Loft Jazz venues: RivBea and Ali's Alley. Environ was established by Darius, Danny, and Chris Brubeck, sons and bandmates of noted jazz musician Dave Brubeck; the space was managed and named by John Fischer, with assistance by staff Mark Forman and Brian Olewnick.

Environ offered performance space to many Loft Jazz musicians, dancers, and other performance artists. Dave Holland, Anthony Braxton, Charles Tyler, Hamiet Bluiett, David Murray, Lester Bowie, Joseph Bowie, Chico Freeman were some of the many free jazz artists that performed there. James Siegfried, who was later to become better known as James Chance and the Contortions (part of the No Wave scene in NYC), had his debut there. Environ attracted many of the future avant-garde jazz and No Wave musicians to its stage and audience. Muhal Richard Abrams, one of the founders of the AACM, practiced there regularly on the house piano.
