= Fanfare for the Warriors =

Studio album by Art Ensemble of Chicago
- Released: 1973
- Recorded: September 6–8, 1973
- Studio: Paragon Studios, Chicago, IL
- Genre: Jazz
- Length: 38:53
- Label: Atlantic; SD 1651
- Producer: Michael Cuscuna

Art Ensemble of Chicago chronology
Bap-Tizum (1972)	Fanfare for the Warriors (1973)	Kabalaba (1974)

Fanfare for the Warriors is a 1973 album by the Art Ensemble of Chicago first released on the Atlantic label. It features performances by Lester Bowie, Joseph Jarman, Roscoe Mitchell, Malachi Favors Maghostut and Don Moye along with AACM leader Muhal Richard Abrams.

== Reception ==
The Allmusic review by Scott Yanow states "The Art Ensemble of Chicago's first (and arguably most significant) period concluded with this high-quality studio session... all of the selections have their own musical personality. It's a fine showcase for this important avant-garde unit".

Professional ratings
Review scores
Source	Rating
Allmusic	4/5 stars
The Penguin Guide to Jazz Recordings	3.5/4 stars
DownBeat	5/5 stars

== Track listing ==
1. "Illistrum" (Malachi Favors) - 8:17
2. "Barnyard Scuffel Shuffel" (Lester Bowie) - 5:12
3. "Nonaah" (Roscoe Mitchell) - 5:44
4. "Fanfare for the Warriors" (Joseph Jarman) - 7:58
5. "What's to Say" (Jarman) - 4:02
6. "Tnoona" (Mitchell) - 6:25
7. "The Key" (Mitchell) - 1:15

== Personnel ==
- Lester Bowie: trumpet, percussion instruments
- Malachi Favors Maghostut: bass, percussion instruments, vocals
- Joseph Jarman: saxophones, clarinets, percussion instruments
- Roscoe Mitchell: saxophones, clarinets, flute, percussion instruments
- Don Moye: drums, percussion
- Muhal Richard Abrams: piano
