= Young at Heart/Wise in Time =

Studio album by Muhal Richard Abrams
- Released: 1970
- Recorded: 2 June and 20 August 1969
- Studio: Sound Studios, Chicago
- Genre: Jazz
- Length: 51:12
- Label: Delmark
- Producer: Robert G. Koester

Muhal Richard Abrams chronology
| Levels and Degrees of Light (1968) | Young at Heart/Wise in Time (1970) | Things to Come from Those Now Gone (1975) |

Young at Heart/Wise in Time is an album by pianist/composer Muhal Richard Abrams released by the Delmark label in 1970 that featured an LP side-length solo piano composition and Abrams accompanied by Leo Smith, Henry Threadgill, Lester Lashley and Thurman Barker on the other side.

== Reception ==
Professional ratings
Review scores
| Source | Rating |
|---|---|
| Allmusic | 3/5 stars |
| The Penguin Guide to Jazz | 3.5/4 stars |
| The Rolling Stone Jazz Record Guide | 4/5 stars |

The Allmusic review by Scott Yanow calls the album "Fascinating music, it is recommended strictly for the open-eared listener who does not demand that all jazz swing conventionally". The Penguin Guide to Jazz awarded the album 3½ stars stating "Young/Wise combines the definitive Abrams solo performance of the period with a group of tracks of burning intensity". The Rolling Stone Jazz Record Guide said it has "a long example of Abram's reflective piano and a tighter group performance by an excellent AACM quintet".

== Track listing ==
All compositions by Muhal Richard Abrams

1. "Young at Heart" - 29:20
2. "Wise in Time" - 21:52

== Personnel ==
- Muhal Richard Abrams: piano
- Henry Threadgill: alto saxophone (track 2)
- Leo Smith: trumpet, flugelhorn (track 2)
- Lester Lashley: bass (track 2)
- Thurman Barker: drums (track 2)
