= Amina Claudine Myers =

American jazz musician (born 1942)

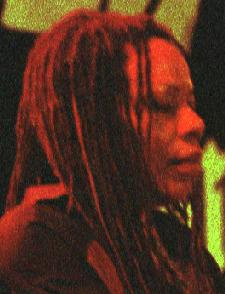

Background information
- Born: March 21, 1942 (age 83); Blackwell, Arkansas, United States
- Genres: Jazz, Gospel
- Occupations: Musician, composer, arranger
- Instruments: Vocals, piano, organ
- Years active: 1969–present

Amina Claudine Myers (born March 21, 1942) is an American jazz pianist, organist, vocalist, composer, and arranger.

== Biography ==
Born in Blackwell, Arkansas, "Myers was brought up largely by her great-aunt, a schoolteacher, and her great-uncle, a carpenter by trade who played the clarinet, piano, and flute". She started taking piano lessons around the age of four, including at Sacred Hearts Catholic School, and when she was seven, her family moved to Roosevelt, a Black community outside of Dallas, Texas. Myers took piano and violin lessons, but eventually, partly for financial reasons, settled on the piano, taking weekly lessons of fifteen minutes each. She began to learn some European classical music at high school, but this was interrupted when she and the family moved back to Blackwell.

Myers majored in music education at Philander Smith College in Little Rock, Arkansas. In her second year, she was invited to play at The Safari Room in Memphis, Tennessee. This engagement, however, was very brief, as her musical repertoire was too limited. After graduation, she moved in 1963 to Chicago, where she taught music at an elementary school. She also attended classes at Roosevelt University and worked with musicians such as Sonny Stitt and Gene Ammons. She was one of the performers at the AACM's second concert. In the late 1960s, Myers added "Amina" to her name.

In 1976 Myers relocated to New York City, where she intensified her compositional work and expanded it into the realm of Off-Broadway productions. She also continued performing and recording as a pianist and organist. Around 1978 she began touring in Europe with the Lester Bowie Quintet and his New York Organ Ensemble.

== Discography ==
=== As leader ===
- Poems for Piano: The Piano Music of Marion Brown (Sweet Earth, 1979)
- Song for Mother E with Pheeroan akLaff (Leo, 1980)
- Salutes Bessie Smith (Leo, 1980)
- The Circle of Time (Black Saint, 1983)
- Jumping in the Sugar Bowl (Minor Music, 1984)
- Country Girl (Minor Music, 1986)
- Amina (RCA Novus, 1987)
- In Touch (RCA Novus, 1989)
- Women In (E)Motion Festival (Tradition & Moderne, recorded 1988 released 2004)
- Augmented Variations (Amina C records, 2004)
- Sama Rou (Amina C records, 2016)
- Solace of the Mind (Red Hook Records, 2025)

=== With others ===
With Muhal Richard Abrams

- Lifea Blinec (Arista Novus, 1978)
- Spihumonesty (Black Saint, 1979)
- Duet (Black Saint, 1981)

With the Art Ensemble of Chicago

- Salutes the Chicago Blues Tradition (AECO, 1993)

With Arthur Blythe

- Blythe Spirit (Columbia, 1981)

With Lester Bowie

- African Children (Horo, 1978)
- The Fifth Power (Black Saint, 1978)
- The Organizer (DIW, 1991)
- Funky T. Cool T. (DIW, 1991)

With Frank Lowe

- Exotic Heartbreak (Soul Note, 1981)

With Maurice McIntyre

- Humility in the Light of the Creator (Delmark, 1969)

With Greg Osby

- Season of Renewal (JMT, 1990)

With Jim Pepper

- Afro Indian Blues (recorded 1991, released 2006)

With Wadada Leo Smith

- Central Park's Mosaics of Reservoir, Lake, Paths and Gardens (Red Hook, 2024)

With Third Rail (James Blood Ulmer & Bill Laswell)

- South Delta Space Age (Antilles, 1995)

With Henry Threadgill

- X-75 Volume 1 (1979)
- Subject to Change (1985)
- Song Out of My Trees (1994)

With James Blood Ulmer

- Blue Blood (Innerythmic, 2000)
