= Muhal Richard Abrams =

American jazz musician and educator (1930–2017)

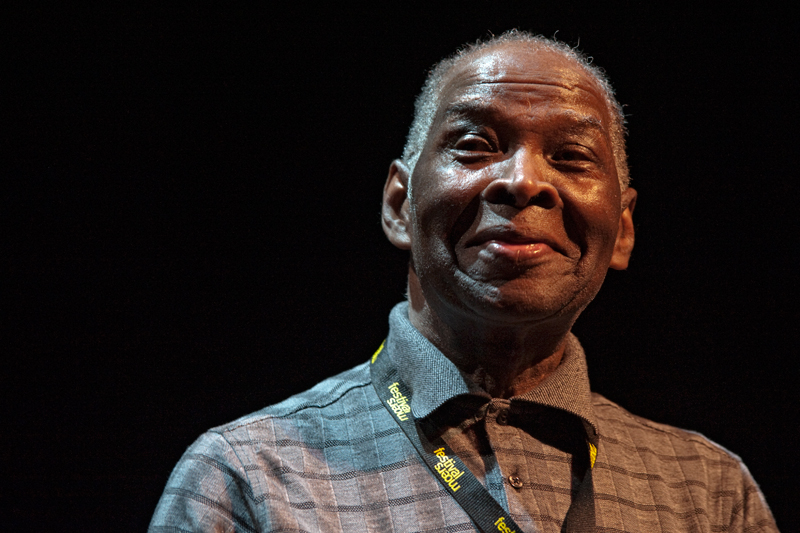
- Abrams at Moers Festival, 2009

Background information
- Born: Richard Lewis Abrams; September 19, 1930; Chicago, Illinois, U.S.
- Died: October 29, 2017 (aged 87) Manhattan, New York, U.S.
- Genres: Free jazz, post-bop
- Occupations: Musician, bandleader, composer
- Instruments: Piano, clarinet, cello
- Years active: 1950s–2017
- Labels: Delmark, Black Saint, Novus, New World, Pi

Muhal Richard Abrams (born Richard Lewis Abrams; September 19, 1930 – October 29, 2017) was an American educator, administrator, composer, arranger, clarinetist, cellist, and jazz pianist in the free jazz medium. He recorded and toured the United States, Canada and Europe with his orchestra, sextet, quartet, duo, and as a solo pianist.

He was a founding member and the first president of the Association for the Advancement of Creative Musicians (AACM).

== Early life ==
Abrams's mother, Edna, was born in Memphis, Tennessee. His father, Milton, was born in Alabama and moved with his parents to Chicago. Richard Lewis Abrams was born there, the second of nine children, on September 19, 1930. His father became a self-employed handyman; his mother was a housewife.

"Abrams's paternal grandfather was 'what you call a junk man', selling the fruits of neighborhood foraging. Abrams and his brother would pull the cart around the neighborhood, eventually arriving at a junk-yard on State Street, where the items would be sold." Abrams first attended Forrestville public school in Chicago. He grew up in a gang area; truancy and fighting meant that he was sent to Moseley School, a reformatory school for boys. There, in addition to strict discipline, he was taught about black histories. He later moved to DuSable High School. Although he was aware of the strong music program there, led by Walter Dyett, Abrams preferred playing sports, so did not participate in Dyett's classes. Among the future musicians Abrams met at the school were Charles Davis, Richard Davis, John Gilmore, Johnny Griffin, Laurdine Patrick, and Julian Priester.

As a child, Abrams was interested in the arts – film, painting, sculpture, and music. He later recounted that, in 1946, he decided to concentrate on the last of these, so left school and started piano lessons with a classically trained church pianist. He went on to study at the Metropolitan School of Music in Chicago, which merged with Roosevelt University. "Supporting his studies in counterpoint, keyboard harmony, theory, and composition with a day job at a downtown printing company, Abrams eventually bought a second-hand piano." He also dropped out of his music school, reporting of his studies: "I didn't get too much out of that, because it wasn't what I was hearing in the street". He then decided to study independently: "I've always had a natural ability to study and analyze things. I used that ability, not even knowing what it was (it was just a feeling) and started to read books." In Abrams' words:

From there, I acquired a small spinet piano and started to teach myself how to play the instrument and read the notes – or, first of all, what key the music was in. It took time and a lot of sweat. But I analyzed it and before long I was playing with the musicians on the scene. I listened to Art Tatum, Charlie Parker, Thelonious Monk, Bud Powell and many others and concentrated on Duke Ellington and Fletcher Henderson for composition. Later I got scores and studied more extensive things that take place in classical composition and started to practice classical pieces on the piano.

== Later life and career ==
=== 1950s and 1960s ===
Abrams started out "playing all kinds of gigs - blues, jazz, stage shows, rhythm and blues, and church socials." His musical abilities earned him jobs working with "everyone from Dexter Gordon and Max Roach to Ruth Brown and Woody Shaw."

In the mid-1950s, Abrams was becoming better known as both a pianist and a composer. A strong influence on his direction as a pianist at that time was King Fleming, for whom Abrams also composed and arranged. Another local man, William E. Jackson, helped Abrams develop his arranging and orchestration skills. Abrams co-founded a quintet named the MJT+3, and recorded with them in 1957, resulting in Daddy-O Presents MJT+3, which contained several of his compositions. Abrams also became more involved in investigating the "occult arts" around 1959 or 1960, and joined the Rosicrucians.

Abrams's son, Richard Jr., was at high school in the early 1960s.

Still eager for self-development, Abrams was introduced to and acquired books on musical composition written by Joseph Schillinger. In the books, Abrams found topics that resonated, including the incorporation of spirituality into music. At a more practical level, the pianist reported that "The Schillinger stuff taught me to break things back down into raw material – where it came from – and then, on to the whole idea of a personal or individual approach to composition."

Abrams was able to apply his learning after organising young musicians in the area into an ensemble that rehearsed at the C&C Lounge in Chicago from 1961. This became known as the Experimental Band, and "became a forum for Abrams to test his new, Schillinger-influenced compositional palette."

Around 1963, Abrams was part of a trio with bassist Donald Rafael Garrett and drummer Steve McCall. The pianist lived with his wife, Peggy, in a small basement apartment on South Evans Avenue. It was the location for nightly gatherings of musicians from the area, who "would explore musical, cultural, political, social, and spiritual ideas." Abrams found that he was in, and wanted to be in, the position that Fleming and Jackson had been with him – helping younger and less experienced musicians to develop. The Experimental Band, led by Abrams, encouraged cooperation, knowledge exchange, and the playing of its members' compositions. In interviews in later years, Abrams tended to downplay his influence on other, younger musicians. They, however, remembered things differently: "Everybody was following him around like little puppies", said saxophonist Gene Dinwiddie, while Roscoe Mitchell summarized that "He would always be turning people on to books, and talking about scores. Maybe he just doesn't realize the effect that he had on people's lives." The Experimental Band had very few, if any, public performances. Although some rehearsal tapes were made, these were for study purposes and were routinely recorded over.

In 1965, four men – Abrams, pianist Jodie Christian, composer Phil Cohran, and drummer Steve McCall – agreed to form a new organization of musicians. They invited mostly other African Americans to the first meeting, on May 8, at which they discussed the principles of the nascent organization, the primary one being that it would be for original, creative music. At the second meeting, Abrams was elected president. Later in the month, an official name was chosen – the Association for the Advancement of Creative Musicians (AACM). When the AACM started a school in 1967, Abrams led the classes in composition.

Further exposure with the AACM helped Abrams get a recording contract with Delmark Records. His first album for them, Levels and Degrees of Light, was recorded in 1967, and featured the recording debuts of saxophonist Anthony Braxton, violinist Leroy Jenkins, and bassist Leonard Jones.

Rather than playing in smoky night clubs, AACM members often rented out theaters and lofts where they could perform for attentive and open-minded audiences.

"Abrams took the name Muhal in 1967. Interviewed by the French magazine Jazz in 1973, he said that the word, its origin unclear, means 'number one'."

Abrams also played with saxophonists Eddie Harris, Gordon, and other more bop-oriented musicians during this era.

=== 1970s and 1980s, Loft jazz era ===
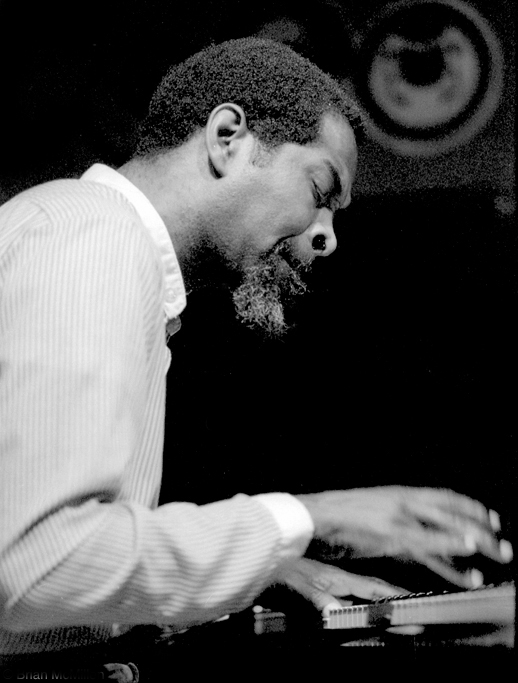
Abrams at Keystone Korner in San Francisco, California, 1979

In the 1970s, Abrams composed for symphony orchestras, string quartets, solo piano, voice, and big bands in addition to making a series of larger ensemble recordings that included harp and accordion. In the early 1970s, his big band had a weekly concert at the Transitions East performance space in Chicago. Abrams formed a sextet from other AACM members in 1972. The other musicians were Reggie Willis on bass, Steve McCall on drums, and Kalaparusha Difda, Wallace McMillan, and Henry Threadgill on various woodwind and saxophone instruments. With this band, Abrams had his first international concerts, playing the Berlin Jazz Festival in 1973. He had a successful solo concert at the Montreaux Jazz Festival the following year, as well as touring Europe with the Art Ensemble of Chicago.

During this time, Abrams recorded extensively under his own name (frequently on the Black Saint label), and as a sideman for musicians such as Marion Brown (Sweet Earth Flying, 1974), Anthony Braxton (Duets 1976, 1976), Roscoe Mitchell (Roscoe Mitchell Quartet, 1976), and Chico Freeman (Morning Prayer, 1976, and Chico, 1977). He served as composer and wrote the theme for the 1970 drama series Bird of the Iron Feather, the first all-Black television soap opera.

Abrams left Chicago for New York in 1976. After initially living with other musicians, he moved his family there the following year. The move of city was partly to be at the center of musical activity, and partly for financial reasons. Initially, there were very few concerts, but he garnered press attention and was able to record annually for the Italian label Black Saint. Experience in writing extended compositions also helped Abrams and other AACM musicians in New York: "The compositions themselves showed that they were outside of the mainstream of jazz, and notice was taken by classical people. You can get access to these [classical music] ensembles, and it started to happen."

In the late 1970s, Abrams was also part of the jazz peer-review panels for the National Endowment for the Arts. "As a Chicagoan who was identified with experimental music, yet who was respected by the ancien regime, Abrams was uniquely positioned to take a leading role in guiding the broad changes in both the demographics and the aesthetic directions of the panels that gradually took place."

His 1-OQA+19 "juxtaposed complex written passages with propulsive rhythms"; and Lifea Blinec "presented multi-instrumentalism, text-sound, and electronic textures."

He was involved in the local "loft jazz" scene in New York. In 1982, he presented an orchestral work at that year's New Music America festival in Chicago. He also helped set up the New York chapter of the AACM, which first presented concerts in the city in 1982.

=== 1990–2017 ===
In 1990 Abrams won the Jazzpar Prize. Abrams received a 1997 Foundation for Contemporary Arts Grants to Artists Award. In 2005, the fortieth anniversary of the founding of the AACM, some of Abrams's solo and ensemble pieces were presented by the organization in New York. In May 2009 the National Endowment for the Arts announced that Abrams would be one of the recipients of the 2010 NEA Jazz Masters Award. In June 2010, Abrams was given the Lifetime Achievement Award by New York City's premier jazz festival, known as the Vision Festival. Abrams died at his home in Manhattan on October 29, 2017, at the age of 87. His daughter, Richarda, became an actress and singer.

== Influence ==
He is a widely influential artist, having played sides for many musicians early in his career, releasing important recordings as a leader, and writing classical works such as his "String Quartet No. 2", which was performed by the Kronos Quartet, on November 22, 1985, at the Carnegie Recital Hall in New York.

== Discography ==
=== As leader ===
Year recorded	Title	Label	Notes
1967	Levels and Degrees of Light	Delmark	With Anthony Braxton (alto sax), Maurice McIntyre (tenor sax), Leroy Jenkins (violin), Gordon Emmanuel (vibraphone), Charles Clark (bass), Leonard Jones (bass), Thurman Barker (drums), Penelope Taylor (vocals), David Moore (vocals)
1969	Young at Heart/Wise in Time	Delmark	One track solo piano; one track quintet, with Henry Threadgill (alto sax), Leo Smith (trumpet, flugelhorn), Lester Lashley (bass), Thurman Baker (drums)
1972	Things to Come from Those Now Gone	Delmark	One track sextet, with Wallace McMillan (alto sax, flute), Edwin Daugherty (alto sax, tenor sax), Reggie Willis (bass), Wilbur Campbell (drums), Steve McCall (drums); one track quintet, without McCall; one track duo, with McMillan (alto sax, flute); one track duo with McCall (drums); one track quartet, with Emanuel Cranshaw (vibraphone), Rufus Reid (bass), Ella Jackson (vocals); one track trio, with Richard Brown (tenor sax), Reid (bass); one track trio with Cranshaw (vibraphone), Reid (bass)
1975	Afrisong	India Navigation/Whynot	Solo piano
1975	Sightsong	Black Saint	Duo, with Malachi Favors (bass)
1977	1-OQA+19	Black Saint	With Henry Threadgill (tenor sax, alto sax, flute, voice), Anthony Braxton (alto sax, soprano sax, flute, clarinet, voice), Leonard Jones (bass, voice), Steve McCall (drums, percussion, voice)
1978	Lifea Blinec	Novus	With Joseph Jarman (bass sax, bassoon, alto clarinet, flute, soprano sax, percussion, vocals), Douglas Ewart (bass clarinet, soprano clarinet, bassoon, alto sax, tenor sax, percussion), Amina Claudine Myers (piano), Thurman Barker (drums, percussion)
1978	Spihumonesty	Black Saint	With Roscoe Mitchell (alto sax, flute), George Lewis (trombone, synthesizer, sousaphone), Leonard Jones (bass), Amina Claudine Myers (piano, organ, electric piano), Youseff Yancy (theremin), Jay Clayton (vocals)
1978	Spiral Live at Montreux 1978	Novus	Solo piano; in concert
1980	Mama and Daddy	Black Saint	With Baikida Carroll (trumpet, flugelhorn), Vincent Chancey (french horn), George Lewis (trombone), Wallace McMillan (alto sax, tenor sax, flute, congas), Bob Stewart (tuba), Leroy Jenkins (violin), Brian Smith: (bass), Andrew Cyrille (percussion), Thurman Barker (drums, marimba, percussion)
1981	Duet	Black Saint	Duo, with Amina Claudine Myers (piano)
1981	Blues Forever	Black Saint	11-piece band, with Baikida Carroll (trumpet, flugelhorn), Craig Harris (trombone), Wallace Laroy McMillan (baritone sax, flute), Jimmy Vass (alto sax, flute), Eugene Ghee (tenor sax, clarinet), Vincent Chancey (French horn), Howard Johnson (tuba, baritone sax), Jean-Paul Bourelly (guitar), Michael Logan (bass), Andrew Cyrille (drums)
1983	Rejoicing with the Light	Black Saint	15-piece band, with Janette Moody (vocals), Warren Smith (percussion, timbales, vibraphone), John Purcell (clarinet, bass clarinet, piccolo, alto sax, oboe, flute), Jean-Paul Bourelly (guitar), Vincent Chancey (French horn), Eugene Ghee (clarinet, bass clarinet, tenor sax), Patience Higgins (clarinet, alto clarinet, baritone sax), Marty Ehrlich (clarinet, alto sax, bass clarinet, flute), Craig Harris (trombone), Baikida Carroll (trumpet, flugelhorn), Howard Johnson (tuba, baritone sax, contrabass clarinet), Abdul Wadud (cello), Rick Rozie (bass), Andrew Cyrille (drums)
1984	View from Within	Black Saint	Octet, with Stanton Davis (trumpet, flugelhorn), John Purcell (soprano sax, alto sax, tenor sax, bass clarinet, flute), Marty Ehrlich (alto sax, flute, piccolo, tenor sax, clarinet, bass clarinet), Warren Smith (vibraphone, marimba, gongs), Ray Mantilla (bongos, conga, percussion), Rick Rozie (bass), Thurman Barker (drums, orchestral bells, marimba, gong)
1986	Roots of Blue	RPR	Duo, with Cecil McBee (bass)
1986	Colors in Thirty-Third	Black Saint	Some tracks trio, with John Purcell (soprano sax, bass clarinet, tenor sax), Fred Hopkins (bass); some tracks quartet, with Andrew Cyrille (drums) added; some tracks sextet, with John Blake (violin) and Dave Holland (bass, cello) added; one track quintet, without Blake; one track quintet without Holland
1989	The Hearinga Suite	Black Saint	18-piece band, with Ron Tooley, Jack Walrath, Cecil Bridgewater and Frank Gordon (trumpet), Clifton Anderson and Dick Griffin (trombone), Jack Jeffers and Bill Lowe (bass trombone), John Purcell (flute, clarinet, tenor sax), Marty Ehrlich (piccolo, flute, clarinet, alto sax), Patience Higgins (bass clarinet, tenor sax), Courtnay Winter (bassoon, bass clarinet, tenor sax), Charles Davis (baritone sax, soprano sax), Diedre Murray (cello), Fred Hopkins (bass), Warren Smith (glockenspiel, vibraphone, percussion), Andrew Cyrille (drums)
1990	Blu Blu Blu	Black Saint	Big band, with Jack Walrath (trumpet), Alfred Patterson (trombone), John Purcell (alto sax, flute, clarinet), Robert De Bellis (alto sax, flute, bass clarinet), Eugene Ghee (tenor sax, clarinet, bass clarinet), Patience Higgins (clarinet, flute, baritone sax), Joe Daley (tuba), Brad Jones (bass), David Fiuczynski (guitar), Warren Smith (vibraphone, timpani), Joel Brandon (whistling), Thurman Barker (drums); with Lindsey Horner (bass) added on three tracks; Mark Taylor (French horn) added on one track
1993	Family Talk	Black Saint	Sextet, with Jack Walrath (trumpet), Patience Higgins (bass clarinet, tenor sax, English horn), Brad Jones (bass), Warren Smith (vibraphone, timpani, marimba, gongs), Reggie Nicholson (drums, marimba, bells)
1994	Think All, Focus One	Black Saint	Septet, with Eddie Allen (trumpet), Eugene Ghee (tenor sax, bass clarinet), Alfred Patterson (trombone), David Gilmore (guitar), Brad Jones (bass), Reggie Nicholson (drums)
1995	Song for All	Black Saint	Octet, with Eddie Allen (trumpet), Aaron Stewart (tenor sax, soprano sax), Craig Harris (trombone), Bryan Carrott (vibraphone, percussion), Brad Jones (bass), Reggie Nicholson (drums), Richarda Abrams (vocals)
1995	One Line, Two Views	New World	10-piece band, with Eddie Allen (trumpet), Patience Higgins (tenor sax, bass clarinet), Marty Ehrlich (alto sax, bass clarinet), Bryan Carrott (vibraphone), Mark Feldman (violin), Tony Cedras (accordion), Anne LeBaron (harp), Lindsey Horner (bass), Reggie Nicholson (drums); all also perform percussion and vocals
1996	The Open Air Meeting	New World	Duo, with Marty Ehrlich; in concert
1998	Vision Towards Essence	Pi	Solo piano; in concert; released 2007
2000	The Visibility of Thought	Chesky	Various formats; with Jon Deak (contrabass), Joseph Kubera (piano), Mark Feldman (violin), Thomas Buckner (baritone), Ralph Farris (viola), Dorothy Lawson (cello), Todd Reynolds and Mary Rowell (violin), Philip Bush (piano)
2005	Streaming	Pi	Trio, with George E. Lewis (trombone, laptop), Roscoe Mitchell (saxes, percussion)
2009 / 2010	SoundDance	Pi	First four tracks with Fred Anderson (tenor sax); remaining four tracks with George E. Lewis (trombone, laptop)
2010 (released)	Spectrum	Mutable	One track duo, with Roscoe Mitchell (alto sax); one track with the Janáček Philharmonic Orchestra, Thomas Buckner (baritone); one track without Buckner

=== As sideman ===
With Art Ensemble of Chicago

- Fanfare for the Warriors (Atlantic, 1974)
- Kabalaba (AECO, 1978)

With Barry Altschul

- You Can't Name Your Own Tune (Muse, 1977)

With Hamiet Bluiett

- Saying Something for All (1998)

With Anthony Braxton

- Three Compositions of New Jazz (Delmark, 1968)
- Creative Orchestra Music 1976 (Arista, 1976)
- Duets 1976 (Arista, 1976)
- Quintet (Basel) 1977 (hatOLOGY, 1977 [2000])
- Live At The Rainbow Gallery '79 (Hi Hat, 2016)

With Marion Brown

- Sweet Earth Flying (Impulse!, 1974)

With Creative Construction Company

- Creative Construction Company (Muse, 1970 [1975])
- Creative Construction Company Vol. II (Muse, 1970 [1976])

With Jack DeJohnette

- Made in Chicago (ECM, 2013 [2015]) with Larry Gray, Roscoe Mitchell and Henry Threadgill

With Kenny Dorham

- Kenny Dorham Sextet (1970)

With Marty Ehrlich

- Emergency Peace (1990)

With Chico Freeman

- Morning Prayer (1976)
- Chico (1977)
- Freeman & Freeman (1981)

With Barry Harris

- Interpretations Of Monk Vol. 1 (Koch Jazz, 1997) with Don Cherry, Steve Lacy, Charlie Rouse, Roswell Rudd, Richard Davis, Ben Riley, Ed Blackwell

With Eddie Harris

- Instant Death (Atlantic, 1971)
- Eddie Harris Sings the Blues (Atlantic, 1972)
- Excursions (Atlantic, 1973)
- That Is Why You're Overweight (Atlantic, 1975)

With Joseph Jarman

- As If It Were the Seasons (1968)

With Leroy Jenkins

- Lifelong Ambitions (Black Saint, 1977)

With Clifford Jordan

- Inward Fire (Muse, 1978)

With Robin Kenyatta

- Beggars and Stealers (1977)

With George E. Lewis

- Shadowgraph (1978, Black Saint)

With Roscoe Mitchell

- Nonaah (1967)
- Roscoe Mitchell Quartet (1975)
- Duets and Solos (1990)
- Live At "A Space" 1975 (Delmark, 2013 DiscogsAllMusic)

With Walter Perkins MJT+3

- Daddy-O Presents MJT+3 (1957)

With Woody Shaw

- The Iron Men with Anthony Braxton (Muse, 1977 [1980])

With Sonny Stitt

- Soul Girl (Paula Records, 1973)

== Gallery ==
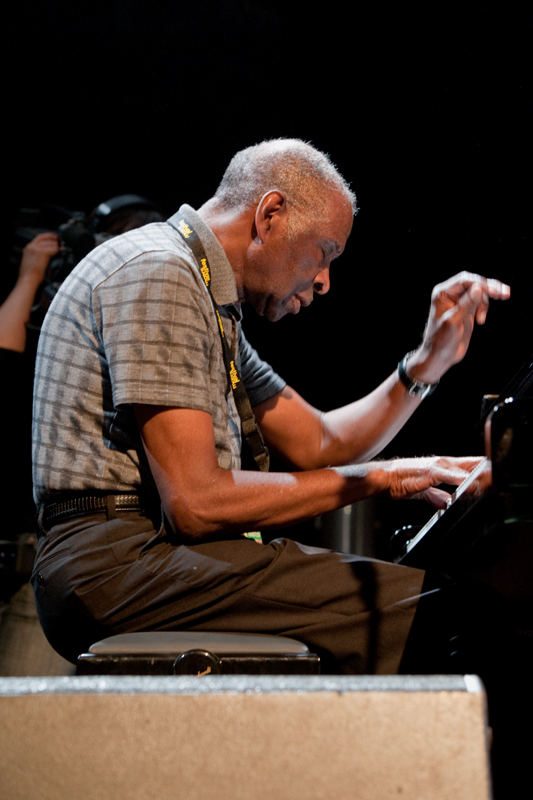
Abrams at Moers Festival, 2009
