= St. Nick's Pub =

Harlem jazz club

Coordinates: 40.826643°N 73.943452°W

St. Nick's Jazz Pub was a jazz club located at 773 St. Nicholas Avenue, in New York City, in the area of Harlem known as Sugar Hill, Manhattan. It was one of the oldest continuous operating jazz clubs in Harlem specializing in jazz and blues. In the 1930s, it was known as Poosepahtuck. In the 1940s, it was known as Lucky's Rendezvous and owned by Luckey Roberts. Roberts was Duke Ellington's and George Gershwin's teacher and mentor. Artists such as Art Tatum, Donald Lambert, Marlowe Morris, Duke Ellington, and Clifton Webb performed at the Rendezvous.

== History ==
In the 1930s, it was called Pooseepahtuck Club, which was named after Poospatuck Native Americans in New York. Joe Jordan was the house pianist and Monette Moore was a featured vocalist.

In the 1940s, the club was owned by Luckey Roberts, a well-known Harlem pianist and composer. He was one of the first ragtime composers. Roberts along with James P. Johnson were developers of the stride piano style in 1919. In his later years, Roberts recorded with Willie "The Lion" Smith and performed honky tonk-style piano solos with clarinetist Garvin Bushell.

In the 1950s, the club was called Pink Angel and owned by Lillian Lampkin. She was the mother of current owner Vincent Lampkin. It became St. Nick's in the 1960s.

For decades, the pub was known for its late night jazz sessions where some of the best musicians in the area would come to jam. An historic jazz spot in Sugar Hill, Manhattan Harlem, it has been legendary for over 50 years. Many notable musicians, artists, and singers have played at St. Nick's Pub over its 50 years, such as Miles Davis, Billie Holiday, and Lena Horne.

Berta Alloway was a music promoter at St. Nick's Pub when it was leased by Earl Spain. In 1993 she started the Monday night jam sessions. Alloway and Spain were known to have brought jazz back to Uptown in Harlem.

The saxophonist Patience Higgins (and late bassist Andy McCloud III) were original St Nick's Pub regulars. They were a part of the house band, along with drummer Dave Gibson, pianists Les Kurtz and Marcus Persiani. The pub was also known for having surprise guests along with regulars; such as Roy Hargrove, Russell Malone, Stanley Turrentine, Tamm E. Hunt, Craig Haynes, Donald Byrd, Frank Lacy, Melvin Vines and the Harlem Jazz Machine (Monday Night Jam Sessions, Atiba Kwabena-Wilson with his band, the Befo’ Quotet, Savion Glover the tap dancer, Vanessa Rubin, David Murray, Stevie Wonder, Dennis Davis, Lawrence Clark, Wycliffe Gordon, George Braith, Olu Dara, T.C. III, James Carter, Buster Brown, Dennis Llewellyn Day aka Dennis Day, Bill Saxton, Rahn Burton, Gregory Porter, Donald Smith, Leopolda Fleming, Sonny Rollins, Bill Saxton, Wayne Escoffery, Hamiet Bluiett, Sophia Loren Coffee (vocalist & Entertainment Promoter for St. Nick's Pub), Lybya Pugh, Sugar Hill Jazz Quartet, Kathryn Farmer, and Grammy award winner pianist Albert "Chip" Crawford. Chip Crawford is 2017 Grammy Award Jazz album vocalist winner Gregory Porter's pianist.

In December 2011, St. Nick's Pub closed due to not having a renewed liquor license. On March 22, 2018, St Nick's Pub was damaged by a fire, which resulted in the death of fireman Michael R. Davidson (NY Fire Department - Engine Company 69). As a result of the fire damage, the building was demolished. At the time of the fire, the pub was being used as a movie set for the film “Motherless Brooklyn", directed by Edward Norton, and starting Norton, Bruce Willis, Willem Dafoe, and Alec Baldwin.
