= Juice (Oran "Juice" Jones album) =

Studio album by Oran "Juice" Jones
- Released: February 12, 1986
- Recorded: 1985–1986
- Studios: Chung King House of Metal; Shakedown Sound; Unique; New Fresh; Rawlston
- Genre: R&B
- Length: 40:59
- Labels: Def Jam; Columbia
- Producers: Kurtis Blow; Russell Simmons; Vincent Bell

Oran "Juice" Jones chronology
Juice (1986)	GTO: Gangsters Takin' Over (1987)

Singles from Juice
- 1. "The Rain" Released: 1986

Professional ratings
Review scores
Source	Rating
AllMusic	4/5 stars
The Village Voice	C+

Juice is the debut studio album by American singer Oran "Juice" Jones. It was released in 1986 through Def Jam Recordings, marking the first R&B album the label ever released. The recording sessions took place at Chung King House of Metal, Shakedown Sound Studios, Unique Recording, New Fresh, and Rawlston Recording Studio, in Brooklyn. The album was produced by Vincent Bell, Russell Simmons, and Kurtis Blow. It peaked at number 44 on the Billboard 200 and number 3 on the Top R&B/Hip-Hop Albums charts. "The Rain" reached number 9 on the Billboard Hot 100 and received gold certification by the Recording Industry Association of America on October 7, 1991.

== Track listing ==
No.	Title	Writer(s)	Producer(s)	Length
1.	"The Rain"	Vincent F. Bell	Vincent Bell; Russell Simmons	5:09
2.	"You Can't Hide From Love"	Bell	Vincent Bell; Russell Simmons	5:14
3.	"Here I Go Again"	Al Cleveland; Terry Johnson; William Robinson; Warren Moore	Vincent Bell; Russell Simmons	4:51
4.	"Curiosity"	Bell	Vincent Bell; Russell Simmons	4:04
5.	"Your Song"	Oran Jones; David Reeves; Larry Smith; Trevor Gale	Vincent Bell; Russell Simmons	4:37
6.	"Love Will Find a Way"	Jones; Izzy Flores	Vincent Bell; Russell Simmons	3:55
7.	"It's Yours"	Jones; Kurtis Walker; Steve Breck; Danny Harris	Kurtis Blow	4:07
8.	"1.2.1."	Bell; Frederick Gordon	Vincent Bell; Russell Simmons	4:16
9.	"Two Faces"	Michael Gabriel	Vincent Bell; Russell Simmons	4:46
Total length:				40:59

== Personnel ==
- Oran "Juice" Jones – vocals, vocal arranger
- Vincent F. Bell – backing vocals, arrangement, vocal arranger, drum programming, producer (tracks: 1–6, 8, 9)
- Frederick Gordon – backing vocals, keyboards, arrangement, drum programming
- Annette Taylor – backing vocals
- Fauns Bell – backing vocals
- Atom – backing vocals
- David Miles – guitar
- Izzy Flores – keyboards
- Michael Gabriel – keyboards, arrangement
- David Boonshoft – bass
- Leon Lewis – bass
- Joe Damone – drums
- Patience Higgins – saxophone
- David Motion – instrumentation (tracks: 2, 3, 5)
- Jimmy Austin – arrangement
- Russell Simmons – producer (tracks: 1–6, 8, 9)
- Kurtis Blow – producer (track 7)
- Akili Walker – engineering
- Andy Wallace – engineering
- Jay Burnett – engineering
- Joe Blaney – engineering
- Howie Weinberg – mastering

== Charts ==
Chart (1986)	Peak position
US Billboard 200	44
US Top R&B/Hip-Hop Albums (Billboard)	3
