= Blu Blu Blu =

Studio album by Muhal Richard Abrams
- Released: 1991
- Recorded: 9–10 November 1990
- Genre: Jazz
- Length: 77:05
- Label: Black Saint
- Producer: Muhal Richard Abrams

Muhal Richard Abrams chronology
The Hearinga Suite (1989)	Blu Blu Blu (1991)	Family Talk (1992)

Professional ratings
Review scores
Source	Rating
Allmusic	4.5/5 stars
The Penguin Guide to Jazz	4/4 stars

Blu Blu Blu is an album by Muhal Richard Abrams released on the Italian Black Saint label in 1991 and features performances of eight of Abrams compositions by a big band. Abrams dedicated the title track on the album to Muddy Waters.

== Reception ==
The Allmusic review by Scott Yanow calls the album "One of pianist/composer Muhal Richard Abrams' strongest big-band dates... The music occasionally glances back at the past but mostly looks forward in its own unique way. Recommended". The music writer Tom Moon includes Blu Blu Blu in his book 1,000 Recordings to Hear Before You Die, commenting that the album succeeds in creating "unpredictable music distinguished by a bustling big-city exuberance." The Penguin Guide to Jazz awarded the album 4 stars calling it "Abram's best album for some time... this is among one of the most important contemporary big band records".

== Track listing ==
All compositions by Muhal Richard Abrams

1. "Plus Equal Minus Balance" - 11:13
2. "Cycles Five" - 7:55
3. "Bloodline" - 15:24
4. "Septone" - 6:32
5. "Blu Blu Blu" - 9:17
6. "Petsrof" - 6:29
7. "One for the Whistler" - 6:51
8. "Stretch Time" - 13:24
- Recorded on 9 & 10 November 1990 at RPM Sound Studios, Inc., New York

== Personnel ==
- Jack Walrath: trumpet
- Alfred Patterson: trombone
- John Purcell: alto saxophone, flute, clarinet
- Robert De Bellis: alto saxophone, flute, bass clarinet
- Eugene Ghee: tenor saxophone, clarinet, bass clarinet
- Patience Higgins: clarinet, flute, baritone saxophone
- Mark Taylor: french horn (track 3)
- Joe Daley: tuba
- Brad Jones: bass
- Lindsey Horner: bass (tracks 2, 4 & 6)
- David Fiuczynski: guitar
- Warren Smith: vibraphone, timpani
- Joel Brandon: whistling
- Thurman Barker: drums
- Muhal Richard Abrams: piano, synthesizer, conductor
