= Oran "Juice" Jones =

American R&B singer

- Born: Oran Edward Jones; March 28, 1957 (age 69); Houston, Texas, United States
- Genres: R&B, soul, electro
- Occupation: Singer
- Instrument: Vocals
- Years active: 1986–1997
- Labels: Def Jam/Columbia; Tommy Boy

Oran "Juice" Jones (born March 28, 1957) is an American retired R&B singer.

== Early life ==
Jones was born in Houston, Texas, but raised in Harlem, New York City, New York.

== Career ==
=== Military career ===
He graduated from the United States Naval Academy in 1981.

Jones served as a sniper officer in the Marine Corps before becoming a musician.

=== Music career ===
Jones was the first musician signed to OBR Records, a subsidiary of Def Jam (which is now part of Universal Music Group).

His song "The Rain" became a hit in 1986, peaking at #9 on the Billboard Hot 100. It ranks him on VH1's top 100 One Hit Wonders of the '80s. He followed it with "How to Love Again," a duet with labelmate Alyson Williams. Jones received a Grammy nomination for "The Rain", with Best R&B Vocal Performance, Male.

Jones released two more albums, but these did not achieve significant success. He collaborated twice with pornographic actress and singer Midori. In 1997 they record a duet of "Let's Stay Together" for his album Player's Call and Jones appeared on Midori's single "5,10,15,20" on the Porn to Rock compilation album released in 1999.

== Discography ==
=== Studio albums ===
Title	Album details	Peak chart positions	
Title	Album details	US 200	US R&B
Juice	Released: 1986; Label: Def Jam/Columbia	44	4
GTO: Gangsters Takin' Over	Released: 1987; Label: Def Jam/Columbia	—	36
To Be Immortal	Released: 1989; Label: Def Jam/Columbia	—	—
Player's Call	Released: 1997; Label: Tommy Boy	—	—
"—" denotes releases that did not chart.

=== Singles ===
Year	Song	Peak chart positions					Certifications	Album
Year	Song	US Hot 100	US R&B	US Dance	AUS	UK	Certifications	Album
1986	"Curiosity"	—	45	—	—	—		Juice
1986	"1.2.1."	—	—	—	—	—		Juice
1986	"The Rain"	9	1	7	85	4	BPI: Silver	Juice
1986	"You Can't Hide from Love"	—	75	—	—	—		Juice
1987	"Here I Go Again"	—	45	—	—	—		Juice
1987	"Cold Spending My Money"	—	41	—	—	—		GTO: Gangsters Takin' Over
1987	"I Just Can't Say Goodbye"	—	—	—	—	—		GTO: Gangsters Takin' Over
1987	"Not on the Outside"	—	—	—	—	—		GTO: Gangsters Takin' Over
1989	"Pipe Dreams"	—	47	—	—	—		To Be Immortal
1990	"Shaniqua"	—	—	—	—	—		To Be Immortal
1997	"Poppin' That Fly"	—	—	—	—	—		Player's Call
1997	"Player's Call"	—	—	—	—	—		Player's Call
"—" denotes releases that did not chart.
