= Midori (actress) =

American pornographic film actress

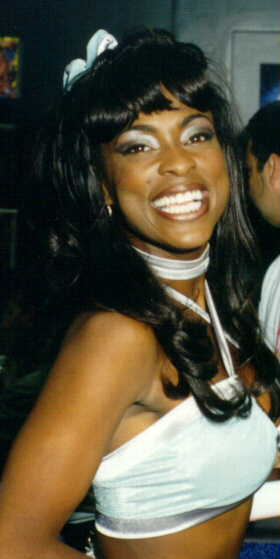
- Midori in 2006
- Other name: Michele Watley
- Occupations: Singer; dancer; model; actress
- Years active: 1989–present
- Known for: First African-American woman to win an AVN Award
- Relatives: Jody Watley (sister)
- Website: midorimusic.net

Michele Watley, known professionally as Midori, is an American singer, dancer, model, actress and former pornographic film actress. She was inducted into the AVN Hall of Fame in 2009 and the Urban X Hall of Fame in 2023. She was named one of the top 10 "hottest black porn stars" of all time by Complex. The Independent named her "the queen of the black hardcore market".

== Early life ==
Watley has a sister, R&B singer Jody Watley, and a brother. Her grandfather and father were ministers.

As a young adult, Watley lived in England for nine months and in 1986, she attended dance school in France.

== Career ==
Whatley appeared briefly in the 1988 movie Coming to America. After the movie was released she changed her stage name to Midori. She worked as an exotic dancer for four years and started performing in hardcore pornography. Watley's rationale for entering the adult film industry was to increase the representation of women of color in the industry, which has historically been white.

In the 1990s, Watley began directing pornographic films. She initially tried to avoid appearing in stereotypical Black themed films, and early in her career was mostly featured in interracial scenes in white-produced films. Watley eventually started working with Black male performers because she "didn't want to have Black guys thinking I didn't do them too". She became a spokesperson for the Free Speech Coalition. She was co-featured, as Michele, in the 1997 stripper documentary The Unveiling, alongside Dixie Evans and Eldad Sahar. Variety described Watley as "a petite African-American single mom who does an athletic pole-climbing act". The Los Angeles Times described Watley as being "loaded with personality, and you hope that she fulfills her dream of moving into mainstream entertainment as a singer or actress".

In 1997, she recorded a duet with Oran "Juice" Jones at Tommy Boy Records and performed on tour with Puff Daddy and Lil' Kim. The next year, Spike Lee offered Watley a role in He Got Game - as a prostitute - a role she declined because she did not want to play a sex worker. Watley was featured in the British documentary Glamour Girlz on Channel 4, which documents Black women in the adult film industry. Watley was featured in the show alongside Charmaine Sinclair, who had relocated to Los Angeles from London to further her career, and porn legend Ron Jeremy. In the series, Watley helps Sinclair expand her career into the adult film industry. Watley also discusses her desire to move into music, and is seen meeting by phone with Luther Campbell of 2 Live Crew to discuss prospects.

In 1999, she had one track entitled 5-10-15-20, which she wrote on the Porn to Rock compilation, which was released on Tommy Boy Records. The single features Oran "Juice" Jones. In an interview with the National Post, Watley said that she was pursuing a career in hip hop by using her fame as a porn star. Then National Post music critic Finbarr O'Reilly called Watley's single on the compilation "one of the better tracks". To support the compilation, Watley toured with fellow porn performers Madison Stone, Johnny Toxic, and Nina Whett, including performing at South by Southwest. That same year, Kid Rock produced the track F.M.A. for the Deep Porn compilation with Midori on vocals. The New York Daily News described the single as "moaning unprintable pillow talk over a backdrop of distorted guitars and hip-hop drums". She also appeared on the cover of the Bad Meets Evil's single "Nuttin' to Do". Watley has a second track, "Zap", produced by Wide. Watley credits Madonna and Lil' Kim as opening the door for sex positive performers, and sex workers, to perform music in mainstream entertainment.

Watley appeared on the cover of Andrew Dice Clay's album Face Down, Ass Up in 2000. She also released her first album, the dance LP Midori (AKA) Michele Watley. In 2001, she released the rap album Miss Judged, which featured rapper AMG. In 2001, she appeared in the video for Coo Coo Cal's "My Projects." She starred in the Polish porn Big Sister and toured Poland. Watley appeared as singer and MC on rapper Warrior's single "Who's Hustlin' Who" in 2003. Watley was described as "decent but uninteresting" on the single by Rap Reviews.

== Personal life ==
In a 1997 interview with Black Video Illustrated, Watley said she was straight; however, in the 1998, documentary The Unveiling, Watley identified as bisexual. She is monogamous. In 1999, Watley was in a relationship with Kid Rock. The relationship ended after three months, with both Rock and Watley citing Rock's busy schedule as the reason for the break up. Watley discovered she was pregnant after her relationship with Rock ended, and she decided not to have the baby.

Watley has a daughter.

Watley does not like watching pornography. It took considerable time for her family to accept that she was an adult film entertainer. She took her mother with her to an adult film award ceremony in an attempt to convince her mother that the adult film industry "also holds formal events where people dress up in black ties and fancy dresses".

== Awards and nominations ==
Year	Ceremony	Result	Category	Film
1998	AVN Award	Nominated	Best New Starlet	—N/a
1998	NightMoves Award	Won	Best Actress (Editor's Choice)	—N/a
1999	AVN Award	Nominated	Female Performer of the Year	—N/a
2001	AVN Award	Won	Best Supporting Actress - Video	American Booty
2001	AVN Award	Nominated	Best Couples Sex Scene - Video (with Dillon Day)	West Side
2001	XRCO Award	Nominated	Actress (Single Performance)	West Side
2009	AVN Award	Won	Hall of Fame	—N/a
2023	Urban X Award	Won	Hall of Fame	—N/a

== Discography ==
=== Albums ===
- Midori (AKA) Michele Watley (2000)
- Miss Judged (2001)

=== Singles ===
- "Who's Hustlin' Who", Warrior featuring Midori (2003)

=== Album appearances ===
- 2002: Perfect Weapon, Warrior, "Who's Hustlin' Who" feat. Midori
- 2000: Deep Porn, Various Artists, "F.M.A." - Kid Rock featuring Midori, "Zap" - Wide featuring Midori
- 1999: Porn to Rock, Various Artists, "5,10,15,20" - Midori featuring Oran "Juice" Jones
- 1997: Player's Call, Oran "Juice" Jones, "Let's Stay Together" (featuring Midori)

=== Cover girl ===
- "Nuttin' To Do," Bad Meets Evil (1999)
- Face Down, Ass Up - Andrew Dice Clay (2000)

=== Music video appearances ===
- 2001: "My Projects," Coo Coo Cal (guest appearance)
