= Porn to Rock =

Compilation album by Various artists
- Released: 1999

Porn to Rock is a various artists album released in 1999, which features songs performed by adult film stars.

== Track listing ==
1. "Harder" (Sabateur featuring Chloe Nichole)
2. "Asshole Man" (Vinnie Spit featuring Mistress Jacqueline)
3. "Man on the Moon" (Madison)
4. "Who's Normal" (David Burrill)
5. "Screw My Head" (Marshall O Boy)
6. "Happy" (Johnny Toxic)
7. "Drink Beer and F***" (Nina Whett)
8. "5, 10, 15, 20" (Midori featuring Oran "Juice" Jones)
9. "The Meat Song" (Candye Kane)
10. "Little Red Riding Hood" (Geoffrey Karen Dior featuring Stacey Q)
11. "Fantasy World" (Ginger Lynn)
12. "Calypso Shower" (Suzi Suzuki)
13. "Strike Back" (Hyapatia Lee)
