= To Be Immortal =

Studio album by Oran "Juice" Jones
- Released: 1989
- Recorded: 1988–1989
- Genre: R&B
- Length: 53:13
- Label: OBR
- Producer: Oran "Juice" Jones, Radcliffe "Rock" Isaacs, Sam Sever, David Sanchez, Guy Vaughn

Oran "Juice" Jones chronology
GTO: Gangsters Takin' Over (1987)	To Be Immortal (1989)	Player's Call (1997)

To Be Immortal is an album by the American musician Oran "Juice" Jones. It was released in 1989. The album proved be an even bigger commercial failure than his previous album, not making it to any Billboard charts.

== Critical reception ==
Professional ratings
Review scores
Source	Rating
AllMusic	3/5 stars
Chicago Tribune	3/4 stars
Robert Christgau	B+

The Chicago Tribune wrote: "In 'Gangster Attitude' and 'Street Style', Jones' delicate tenor is used as an effective counterpoint to the gritty netherworld described and he hints that his insights into gang life come from personal experience."

== Track listing ==
1. "Money, Honey"
2. "Pipe Dreams"
3. "Gangster Attitude"
4. "Never Say Goodbye"
5. "To Be Immortal"
6. "Dollar and a Dream"
7. "Sacrifices"
8. "Shaniqua"
9. "Street Style"
10. "Time"
