= Player's Call =

Studio album by Oran "Juice" Jones
- Released: 1997 (UK); March 12, 2007 (US)
- Recorded: 1997
- Genre: R&B
- Label: Tommy Boy
- Producer: Oran "Juice" Jones, Willie Mitchell

Oran "Juice" Jones chronology
To Be Immortal (1989)	Player's Call (1997)

Professional ratings
Review scores
Source	Rating
Allmusic	3/5 stars

Player's Call is the fourth and final album released by Oran "Juice" Jones. It was originally released by Tommy Boy Records in the United Kingdom in 1997 and was supposed to be a comeback album for Jones after the failure of his previous two albums. However, after the lead single released, "Poppin' that Fly," did not find any success, compounded with the failure of the album in the UK, Tommy Boy shelved the album. On March 12, 2007, Tommy Boy finally released the album in the United States. Most of the album was produced by the legendary Willie Mitchell.

== Track listing ==
1. "So Forth On"
2. "Underworld"
3. "Purse Comes First"
4. "Cold Blooded"
5. "Player's Call"
6. "Poppin' That Fly"
7. "Love Jones for You"
8. "Gigolos Get Lonely Too"
9. "Make Love Your Mind"
10. "Remember the Love"
11. "Sweet Juicy Thang"
12. "Let's Stay Together"
13. "From the Heart"
