= Midtown Manhattan =

- Neighborhood and central business district
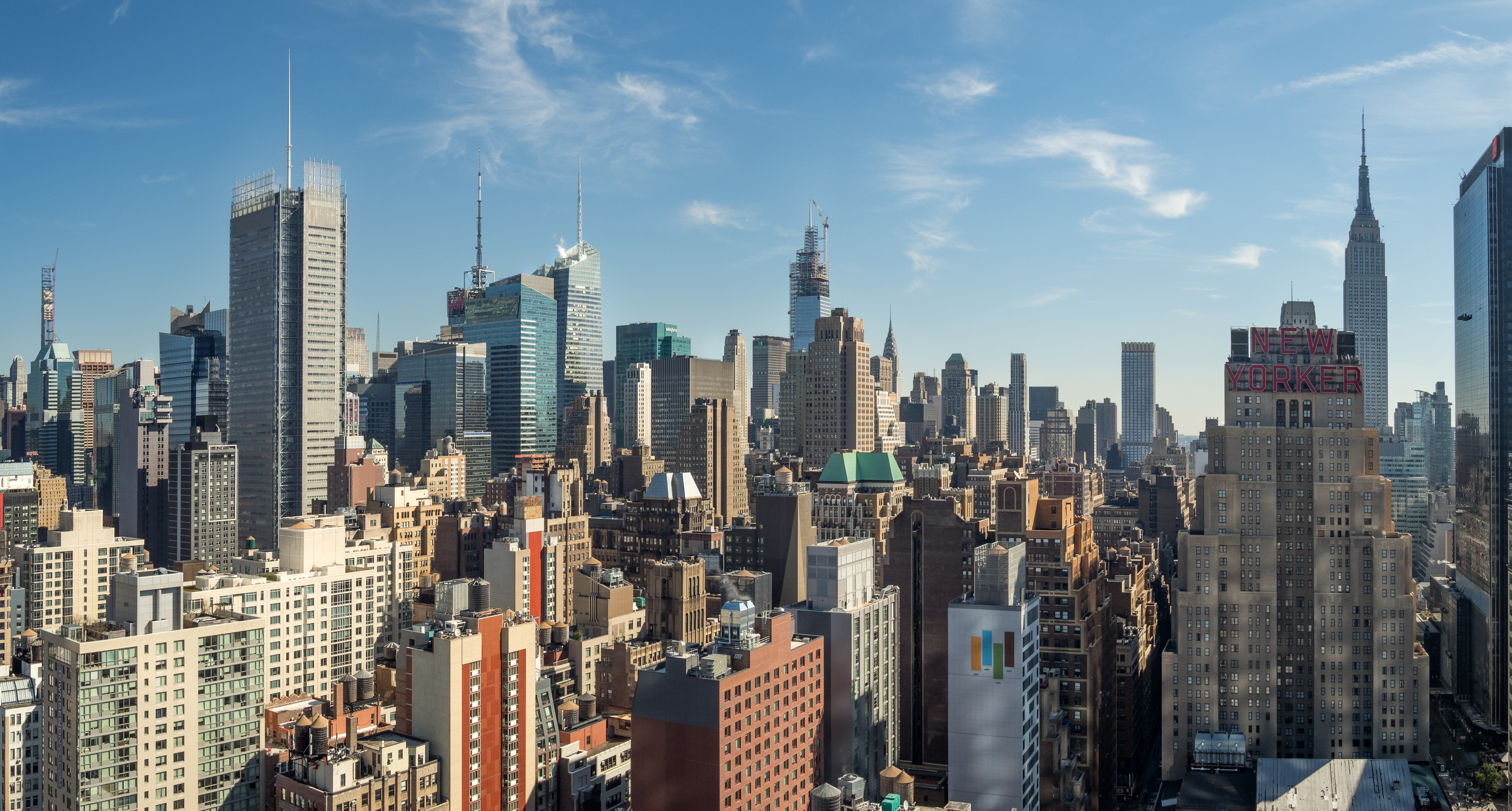
- Midtown Manhattan, October 2019

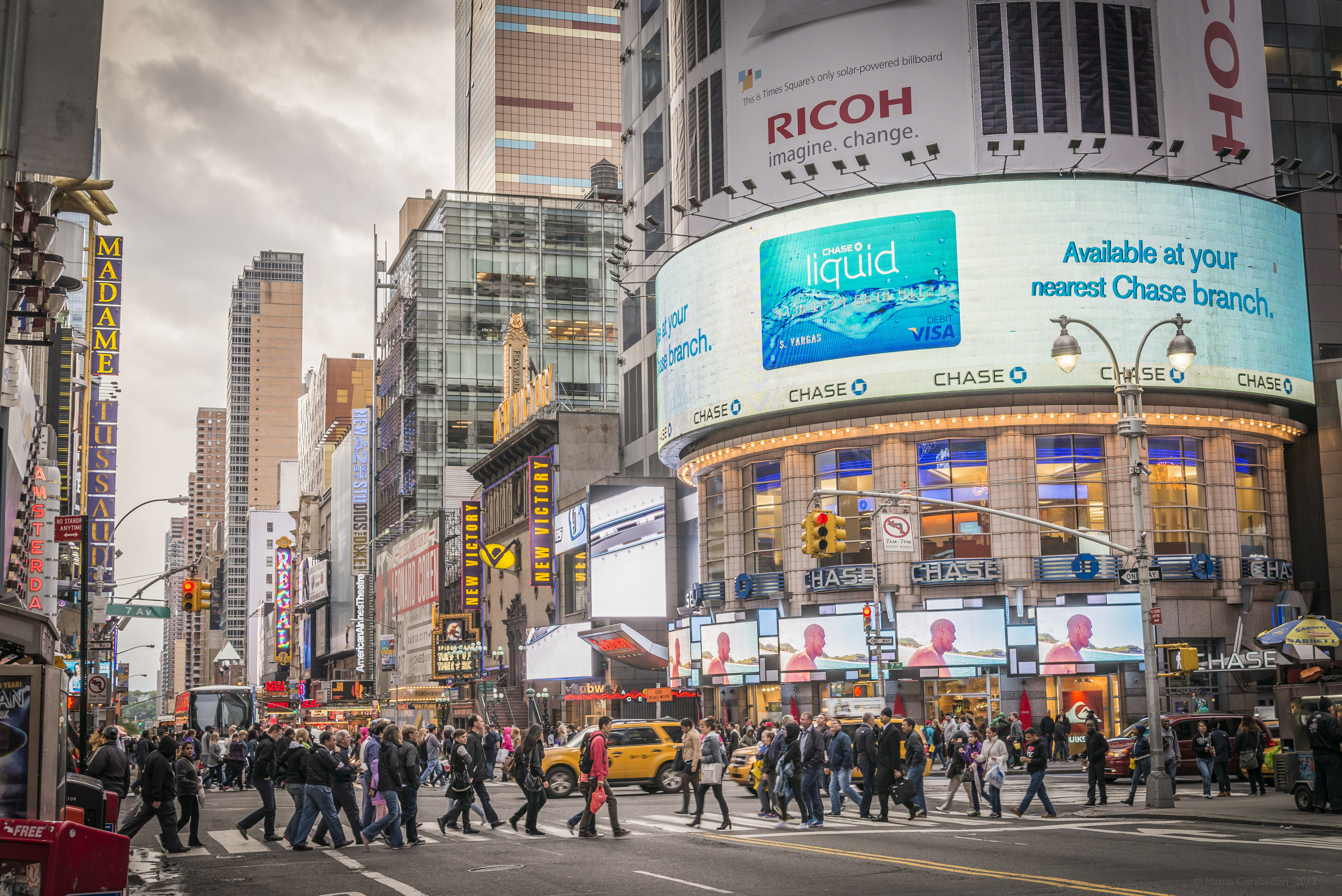
- 42nd Street at 7th Avenue in the Broadway Theater District of Midtown Manhattan
- Interactive map of Midtown Manhattan
- Coordinates: 40°45′17″N 73°59′03″W
- Country: United States
- State: (New York (state)) New York
- City: New York City
- Borough: Manhattan
- Community District: Manhattan 5

Area
  - Total: 2.254 sq mi (5.84 km^{2})

Population (2010)
  - Total: 104,753
  - Density: 46,470/sq mi (17,940/km^{2})

Ethnicity
  - White: 64.1
  - Asian: 20.8
  - Hispanic: 8.1
  - Black: 4.6
  - Others: 2.4

Economics
  - Median income: $120,854
- Time zone: UTC−05:00 (Eastern)
  - Summer (DST): UTC−04:00 (EDT)
- ZIP Codes: 10001, 10016–10019, 10022, 10036, several smaller ZIP Codes
- Area code: 212, 332, 646, and 917

Midtown Manhattan is the central portion of the New York City borough of Manhattan, which serves as the city's and the world's primary central business district. Midtown is home to some of the city's most prominent buildings, including the Empire State Building, the Chrysler Building, the Hudson Yards Redevelopment Project, the headquarters of the United Nations, Grand Central Terminal, and Rockefeller Center, as well as several prominent tourist destinations, including Broadway, Times Square, and Koreatown. Penn Station in Midtown Manhattan is the busiest transportation hub in the Western Hemisphere.

Midtown Manhattan is the largest central business district in the world and ranks among the world's most expensive locations for real estate. Fifth Avenue in Midtown Manhattan commands some of the world's highest retail rents. Midtown Manhattan is the world's largest commercial, entertainment, and media center, and is also a growing financial and fintech center.

Many of New York City's skyscrapers, including its tallest hotels and apartment towers, are located in Midtown Manhattan. The neighborhood hosts commuters and residents working in its offices, hotels, and retail establishments, as well as tourists and students. Times Square, the brightly illuminated hub of the Broadway Theater District, is a major center of the world's entertainment industry. Sixth Avenue also hosts the headquarters of three of the four major U.S. television networks.

Midtown is part of Manhattan Community District 5. It is patrolled by the 14th and 18th precincts of the New York City Police Department.

== Location ==
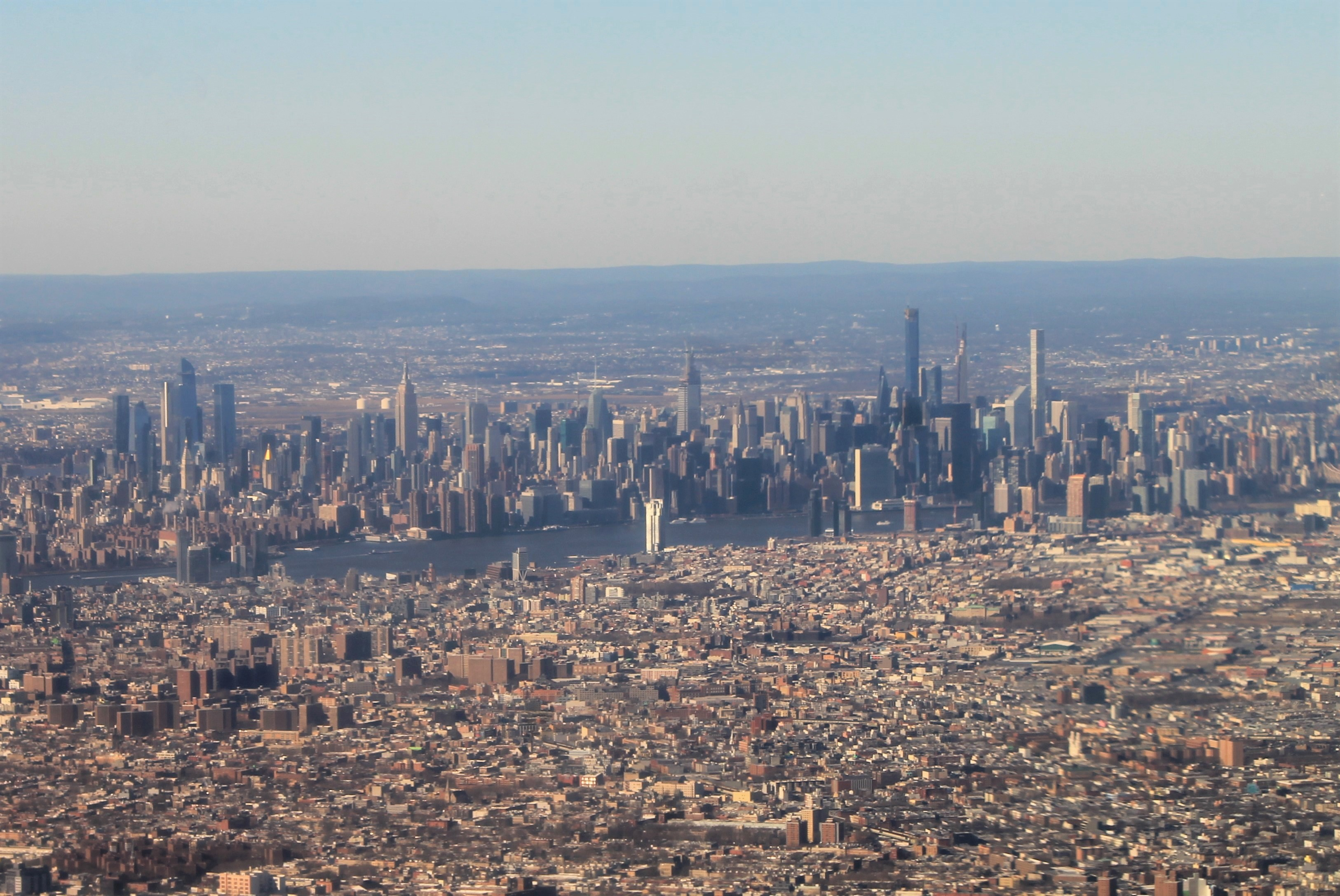
Midtown's skyline seen in January 2020, constituting one of the world's largest central business districts

Geographically, the northern boundary of Midtown Manhattan is commonly defined to be 59th Street; its southern boundary is less clear, and is variously taken to be 34th Street, 23rd Street, or even 14th Street. Midtown spans the entire island of Manhattan along an east–west axis, bounded by the East River on its east and the Hudson River to its west. The Encyclopedia of New York City defines Midtown as extending from 34th Street to 59th Street and from 3rd Avenue to 8th Avenue.

=== Neighborhoods ===
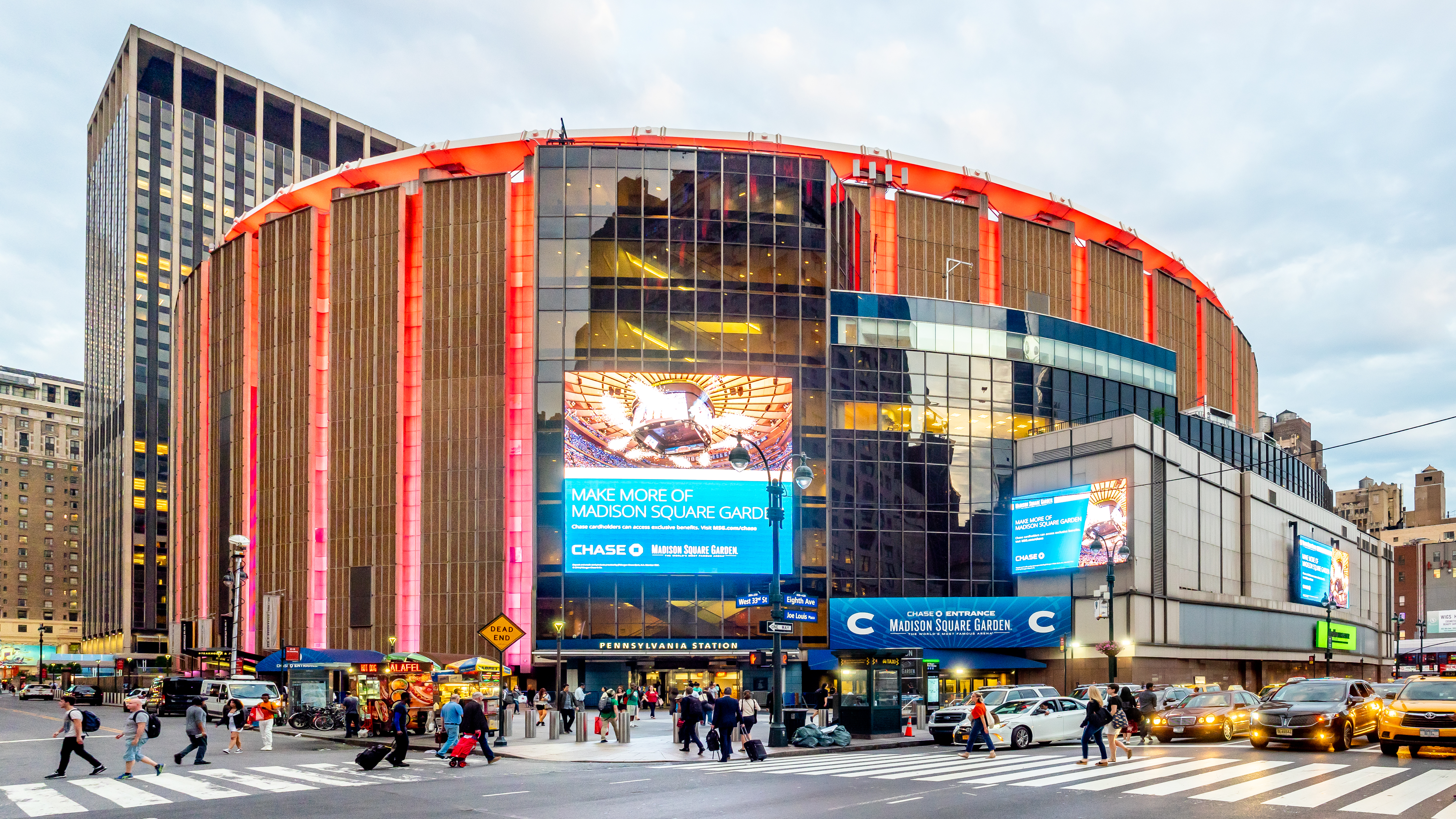
Madison Square Garden

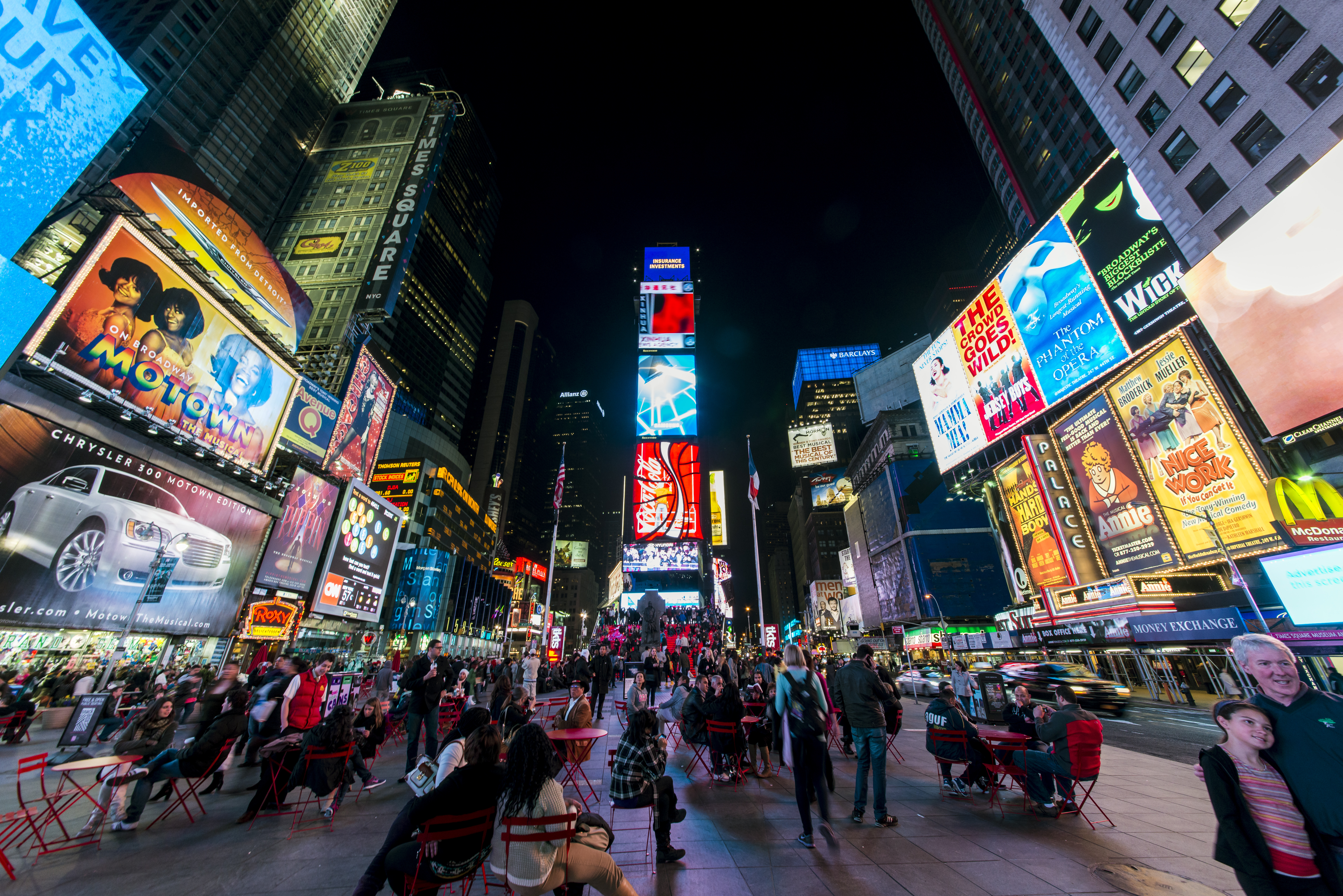
Times Square (2013), one of the world's busiest pedestrian intersections

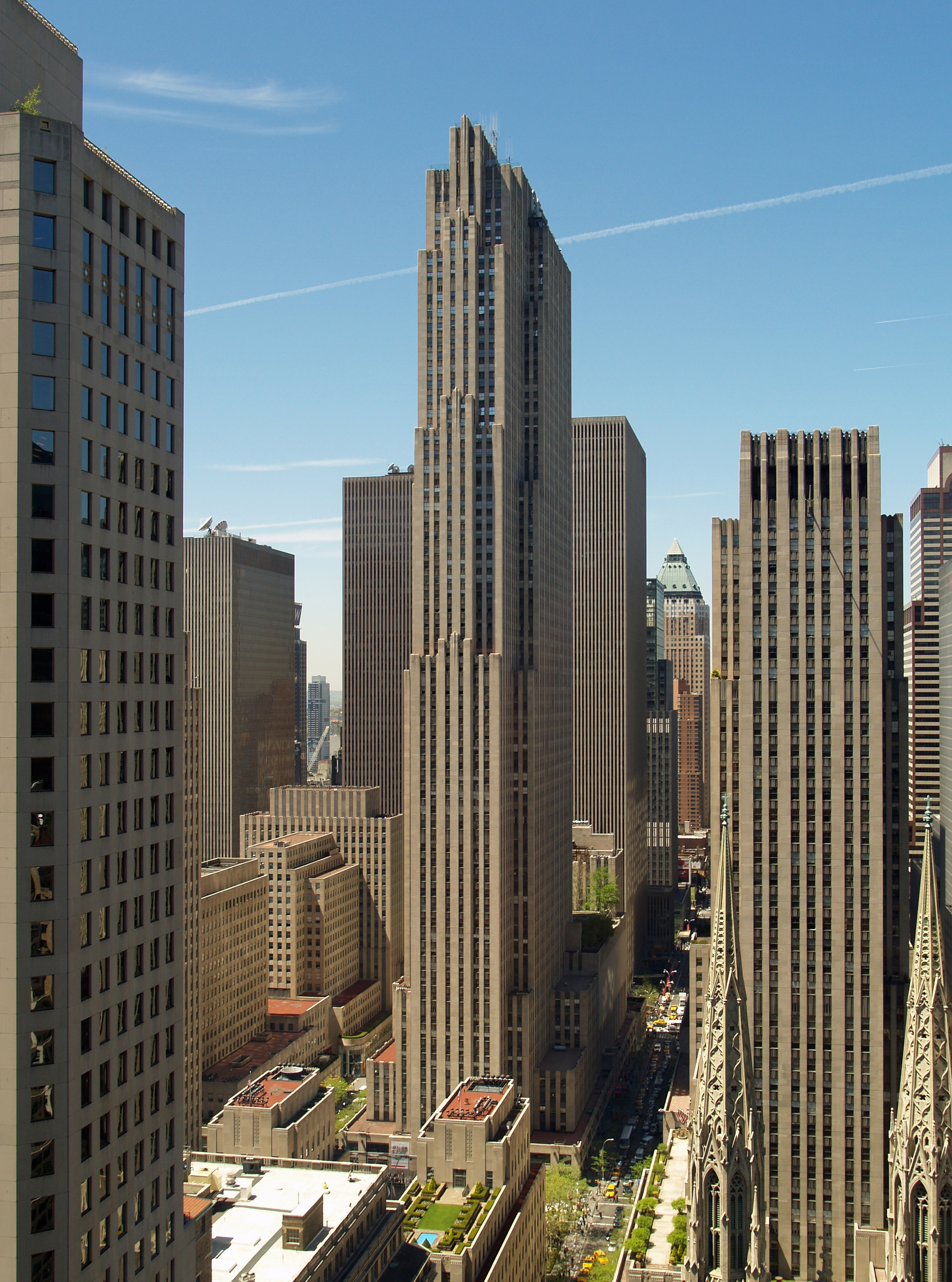
30 Rockefeller Plaza (former GE Building) at Rockefeller Center

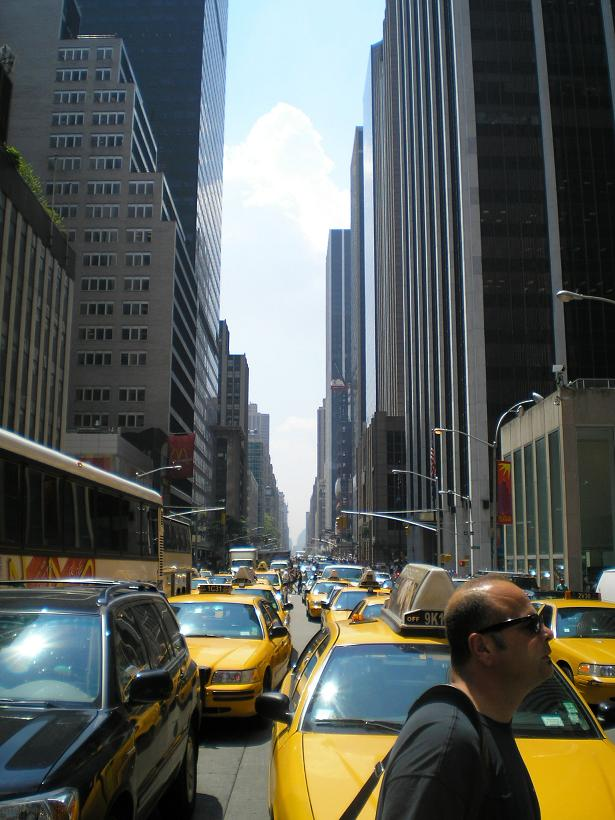
Skyscrapers line Sixth Avenue in the heart of Midtown

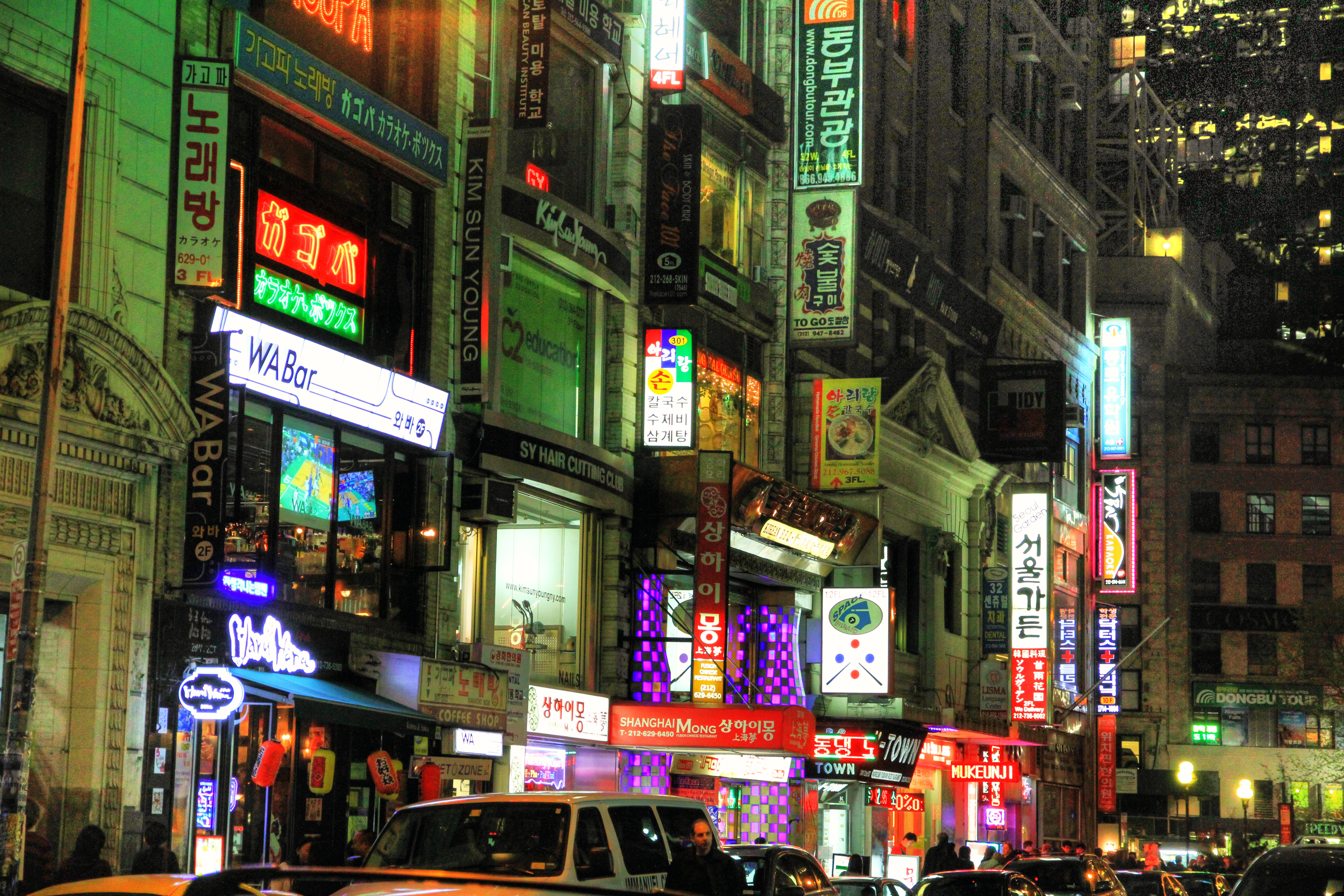
"Korea Way" on 32nd Street in Manhattan's Koreatown

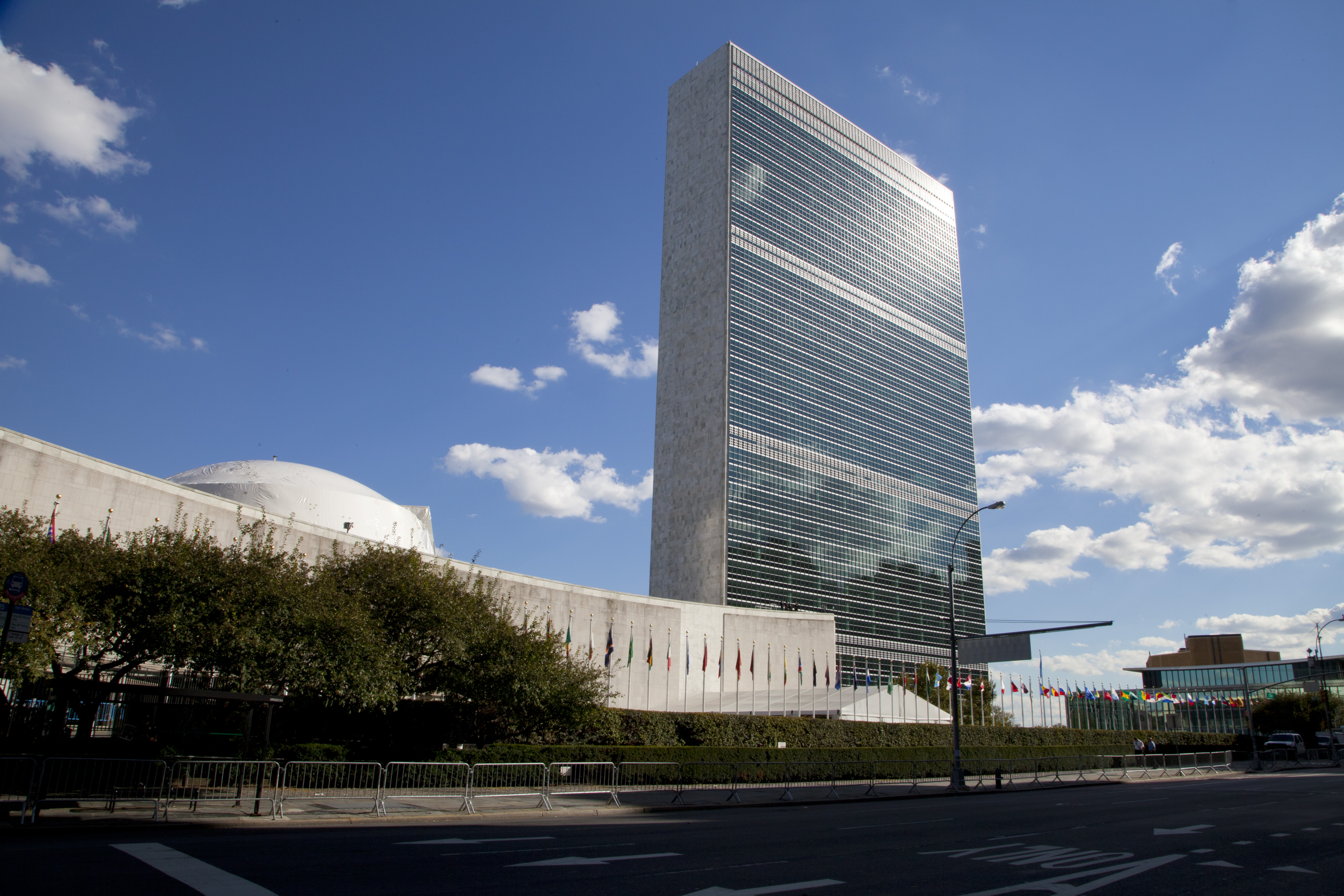
The United Nations General Assembly Building and United Nations Secretariat Building at the United Nations Headquarters

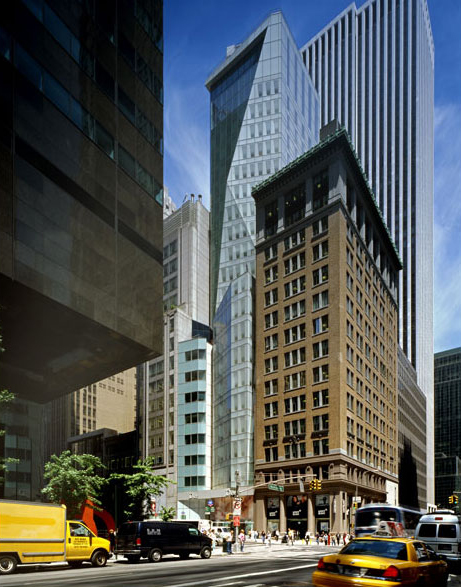
The North American headquarters of LVMH is one of many global luxury retailers clustered in Midtown Manhattan.

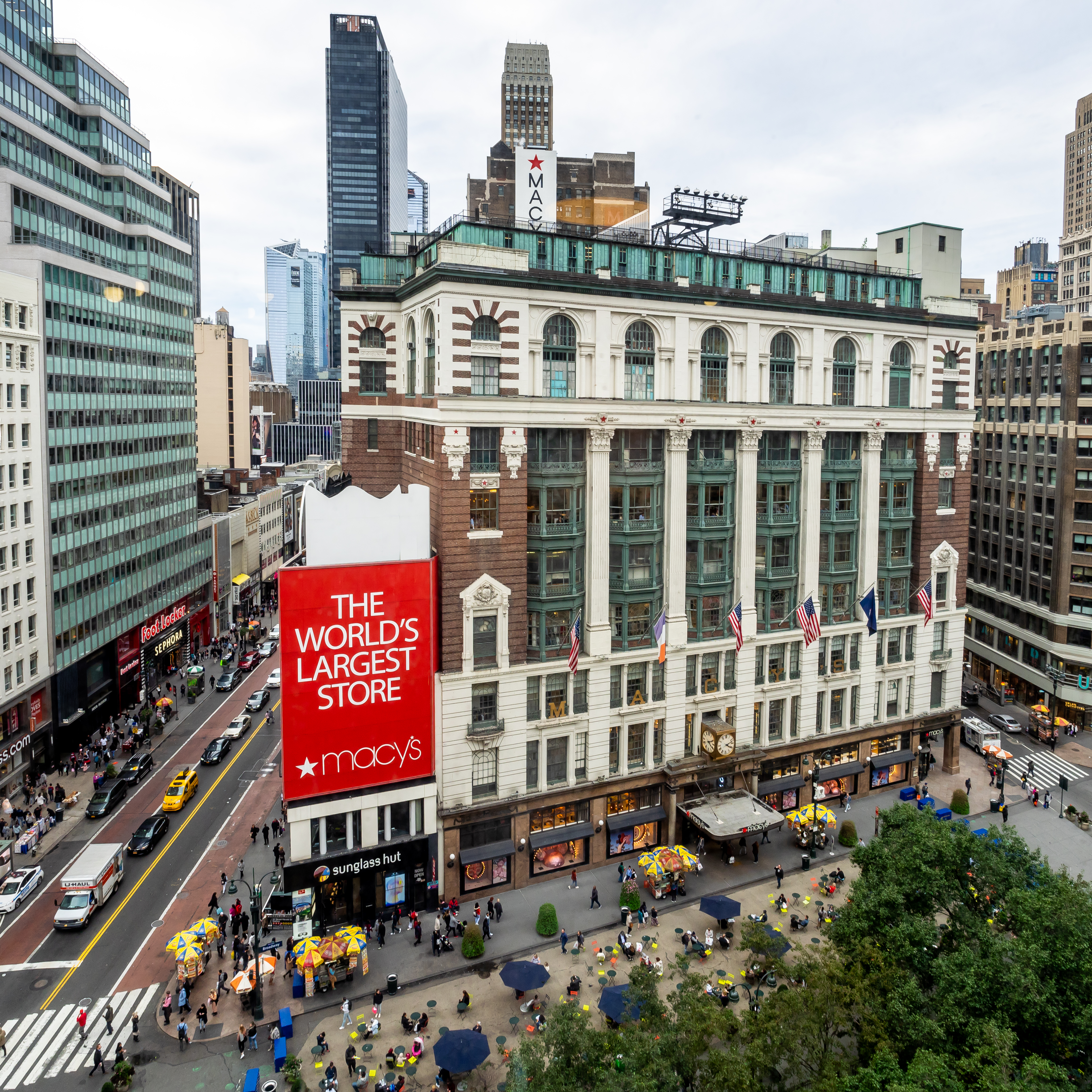
Herald Square with Macy's

In addition to its central business district, Midtown Manhattan encompasses many neighborhoods, including Hell's Kitchen and Chelsea on the West Side, and Murray Hill, Kips Bay, Turtle Bay, and Gramercy Park on the East Side. It is sometimes broken into "Midtown East" and "Midtown West", or north and south as in the New York City Police Department's Midtown North and Midtown South precincts.

Neighborhoods in the Midtown area include the following:

- Between 59th Street to the north and 42nd Street to the south, from west to east:
  - Hell's Kitchen from the Hudson River to 8th Avenue, including
    - Theatre Row on West 42nd Street between 11th Avenue and 9th Avenue,
    - where Hell's Kitchen meets Central Park and the Upper West Side at West 59th Street and 8th Avenue, Columbus Circle
  - Times Square and the Theater District from West 42nd Street to around West 53rd Street (according to some until Central Park at Central Park South/59th Street), and from Eighth Avenue to 6th Avenue
  - The Diamond District on West 47th Street between 6th Avenue and 5th Avenue
  - Midtown East from around 6th Avenue to the East River, including (going from west to east, and north to south):
    - Sutton Place near the East River between East 53rd Street and East 59th Street
    - Turtle Bay from 53rd Street to 42nd Street and from Lexington Avenue to the East River
    - Tudor City from 1st Avenue to 2nd Avenue and East 40th Street to East 43rd Street
- Between 42nd Street north and around 34th Street, from west to east, and north to south:
  - Hell's Kitchen from the Hudson River to 8th Avenue
  - The Garment District from West 42nd Street to West 34th Street and from 9th Avenue to 5th Avenue
  - Herald Square around the intersection of Broadway, Sixth Avenue, and West 34th Street
  - Murray Hill from East 42nd Street to East 34th Street and Fifth Avenue to Second Avenue
- Between 34th Street and 23rd Street, from west to east:
  - Chelsea, between the Hudson River and Sixth Avenue
  - Koreatown from 36th Street to 31st Street, and between Madison Avenue and 6th Avenue, and centered on "Korea Way" on 32nd Street between Madison Avenue and Broadway
  - Rose Hill or Curry Hill between Madison Avenue and 3rd Avenue
  - Kips Bay from 3rd Avenue to the East River
- Between 23rd Street and 14th Street, going west to east and north to south:
  - Chelsea, between the Hudson River and 6th Avenue
  - The Meatpacking District in the southwesternmost corner of Midtown, to the south of West 15th Street
  - Madison Square and the Flatiron District, the area surrounding the intersection of Broadway, 5th Avenue, and 23rd Street.
  - Union Square, to the northeast of the intersection of Broadway, East 14th Street, and Park Avenue South
  - Gramercy from East 23rd Street to East 14th Street and Lexington Avenue to 1st Avenue
  - Peter Cooper Village from East 23rd Street to East 20th Street and 1st Avenue to Avenue C (parallel the East River)
  - Stuyvesant Town from East 20th Street to East 14th Street and 1st Avenue to Avenue C

Midtown is the original district in the United States to bear the name and included historical but now defunct neighborhoods such as the Ladies' Mile, along Fifth Avenue from 14th to 23rd Street; and the Tenderloin, from 23rd to 42nd Street and from Fifth Avenue to Seventh Avenue.

=== Landmarks ===
- Empire State Building
- Museum of Modern Art
- St. Patrick's Cathedral
- Rockefeller Center
- Grand Central Terminal
- New York Public Library
- Chrysler Building
- Deutsche Bank Center
- Bank of America Tower
- United Nations Headquarters
- Carnegie Hall
- Madison Square Garden
- Manhattan Center
- James Farley Post Office
- Pennsylvania Station
- Trump Tower
- Plaza Hotel
- Waldorf-Astoria Hotel
- Bryant Park
- Times Square
- Flagship stores:
  - Bergdorf Goodman (flagship)
  - Lord & Taylor (flagship)
  - Gucci
  - Louis Vuitton
  - Saks Fifth Avenue (flagship)
  - Bloomingdale's
  - Brooks Brothers
  - J. Press
  - Macy's (flagship)
  - Nat Sherman
  - Paul Stuart
  - Tiffany & Co. (flagship)
- Prominent gentlemen's clubs:
  - The Brook
  - Century Association
  - Columbia University Club
  - Cornell Club
  - Harvard Club
  - New York Yacht Club
  - The Penn Club
  - The Princeton Club
  - Racquet and Tennis Club
  - The Union League Club
  - University Club
  - Yale Club

=== Avenues ===
- 12th Avenue
- 11th Avenue
- 10th Avenue
- 9th Avenue
- 8th Avenue
- 7th Avenue
- 6th Avenue (Avenue of the Americas)
- 5th Avenue
- Madison Avenue
- Vanderbilt Avenue
- Park Avenue
- Lexington Avenue
- 3rd Avenue
- 2nd Avenue
- 1st Avenue

Important streets and thoroughfares

- Broadway
- 34th Street
- 42nd Street

=== Differing demarcations ===
The border of Midtown Manhattan is nebulous and further confused by the fact that the term "Midtown Manhattan" can be used to refer either to a district or a group of neighborhoods and districts in Manhattan:

- The area between 14th and 86th Streets includes roughly the center of Manhattan; however, the term Midtown Manhattan can also apply to the area between 31st Street and 59th Streets, although there are still office buildings south of 31st Street.
- Manhattan Community District 5 is located from 14th to 59th Streets, generally between Lexington Avenue and Eighth Avenue. Community District 5 is largely coterminous with Midtown but also includes the Flatiron District, NoMad, Union Square, and parts of Gramercy Park and Rose Hill.
- Midtown proper (within the boundaries of Manhattan Community District 5, and excluding overlapping neighborhoods) is located from 34th to 59th Streets between Third Avenue and Eighth Avenue.
- The "Plaza District", a term used by Manhattan real estate professionals to denote the most expensive area of midtown from a commercial real estate perspective, lies between 42nd Street and 59th Street, from 3rd Avenue to 7th Avenue, about a square kilometer or half a square mile.
- "Midtown South" can refer to the part of Midtown between 23rd Street and around 42nd Street (although its northern boundary is defined differently depending on the source).
- "Midtown West" can refer to the area between 34th and 59th Streets, and between 5th and 12th Avenues.
- "Midtown East" can refer to the area between 42nd and 59th Streets, and between 5th Avenue and the East River.
- In 1982, the City of New York identified the "Manhattan Core" as the area that includes some of the city's most populous neighborhoods, major institutions, parks and transit hubs, and the city's primary Central Business District (CBD), defined as Manhattan below 60th Street. The "Manhattan Core" includes some areas slightly further north of 86th Street in Manhattan, as well as the area below 14th Street. However, this definition is problematic because it ignores the fact that Manhattan has not one but two zones that are job centers, which are separated by a wide swath of low-rise (by New York City standards) residential development: Midtown (which is in Midtown Manhattan) and the Financial District (also known simply as "Downtown" because of its location in southern Manhattan). In other sources, these districts are referred to as separate central business districts.

=== Cityscape ===
Midtown Manhattan viewed from Weehawken, New Jersey, in September 2021, in the afternoon.

Midtown Manhattan viewed from Weehawken, New Jersey, in September 2021, at sunset.

Midtown Manhattan viewed from Weehawken, New Jersey, in September 2021, at night.

== Economy ==
Midtown Manhattan, along with Lower Manhattan, is one of the world's leading financial centers.

=== Corporate headquarters ===
Midtown Manhattan is the world's largest central business district, with 400 million square feet (37.2 million m^{2}) of office space in 2018. Midtown contains the headquarters of major companies, including 4Kids Entertainment (formerly), Barnes & Noble, Bloomberg L.P., Ernst & Young, Calvin Klein, Cantor Fitzgerald, CBS Corporation, Citigroup, Colgate-Palmolive, Cushman & Wakefield, DC Comics, Deloitte, Duane Reade, Estée Lauder Companies, Foot Locker, Frederator Studios, JPMorgan Chase, Hess Corporation, Kroll Inc., L-3 Communications, Marsh & McLennan Companies, Marvel Entertainment, MetLife, MidOcean Partners, Morgan Stanley, Nasdaq, Inc., NBCUniversal, The New York Times Company, NexCen Brands, Paramount Global, Pfizer, Polo Ralph Lauren, Saks Incorporated (Saks Fifth Avenue), The Sharper Image, Simon & Schuster, Six Flags, TBWA Worldwide, Thomson Reuters, Warner Bros. Discovery, Time Warner Cable, The Travelers Companies, and Univision Communications. The New York Institute of Finance is located in Midtown Manhattan.

==== Foreign subsidiary operations ====
Haier operates its United States offices in the Haier Building at 1356 Broadway, formerly the headquarters of the Greenwich Savings Bank. Haier held the opening ceremony on March 4, 2002. Sumitomo Corporation operates its New York office, the headquarters of the corporation's United States operations, at 600 Third Avenue, 10016 in the Murray Hill neighborhood. El Al's North American headquarters are in Midtown. The Air France USA regional headquarters are in 125 West 55th Street in Midtown Manhattan. Hachette Book Group USA has its headquarters in 237 Park Avenue. In 1994 Alitalia considered moving its USA headquarters from Midtown to Lower Manhattan, but decided to keep the offices where they were at the last minute. Global Infrastructure Partners has an office in Midtown Manhattan.

==== Sports leagues ====
Midtown Manhattan is home to the headquarters of Major League Baseball, Major League Soccer, the National Basketball Association, the National Football League, the National Hockey League, the National Women's Soccer League, and the Women's National Basketball Association.

=== Tech and biotech ===
Silicon Alley, the common metonym for New York City's high tech sector, is based in Midtown South, specifically the Flatiron District. Prominent Silicon Alley companies in Midtown include AppNexus, Blue Apron, Gilt, Betterment, Oscar, SoFi, Rent the Runway, Warby Parker, and WeWork. The technology sector has been expanding across Midtown Manhattan since 2010. The biotechnology sector is also growing in Midtown Manhattan based upon the city's strength in academic scientific research and public and commercial financial support. By mid-2014, Accelerator, a biotech investment firm, had raised more than US$30 million from investors, including Eli Lilly and Company, Pfizer, and Johnson & Johnson, for initial funding to create biotechnology startups at the Alexandria Center for Life Science, which encompasses more than 700,000 square feet (65,000 m^{2}) on East 29th Street and promotes collaboration among scientists and entrepreneurs at the center and with nearby academic, medical, and research institutions. The New York City Economic Development Corporation's Early Stage Life Sciences Funding Initiative and venture capital partners, including Celgene, General Electric Ventures, and Eli Lilly, committed a minimum of US$100 million to help launch 15 to 20 ventures in life sciences and biotechnology.

=== Real estate ===
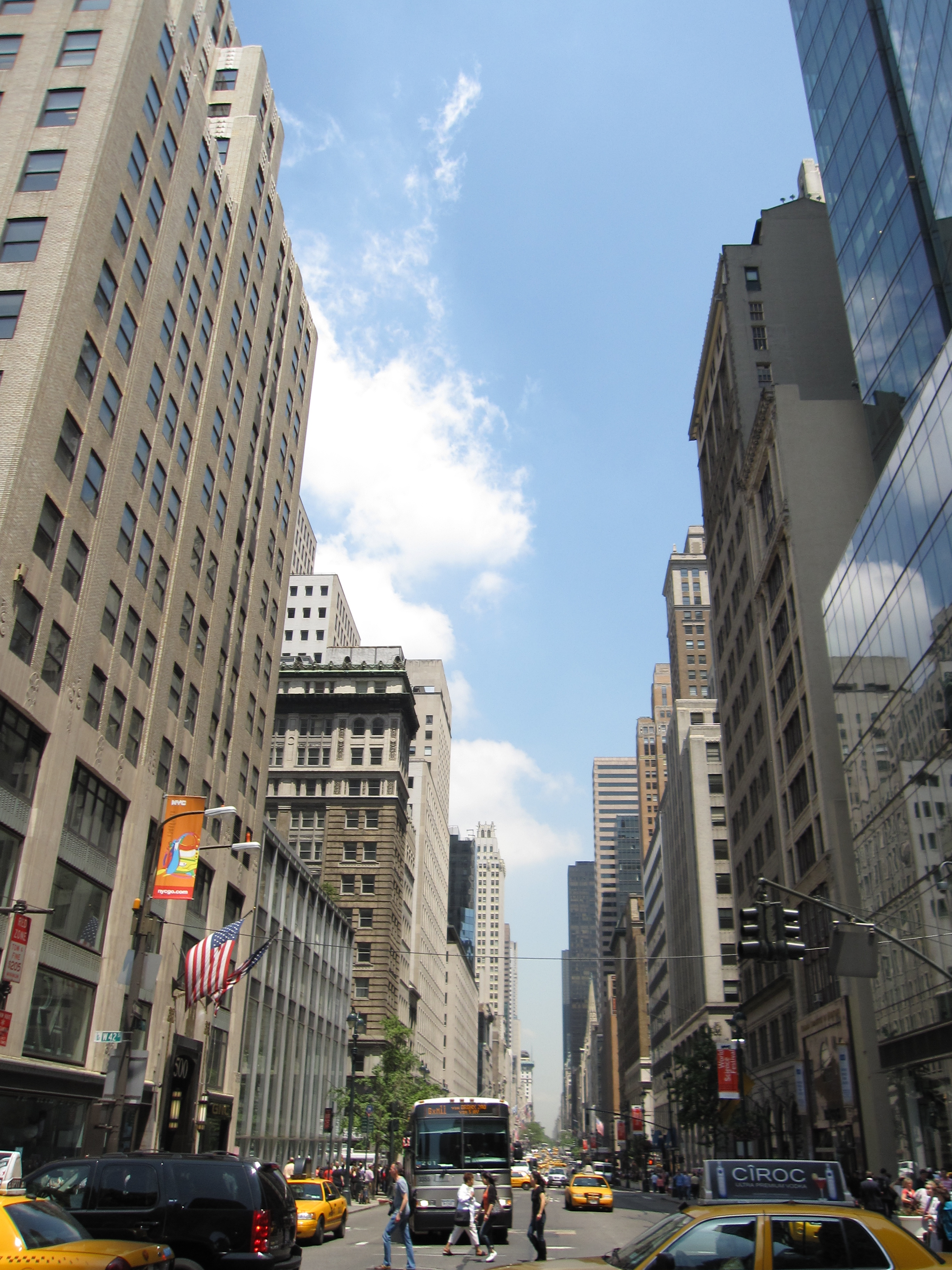
Fifth Avenue in Midtown Manhattan is the most expensive shopping street in the world.

Real estate is a major force in Midtown Manhattan's economy, and indeed the city's, as the total value of all New York City property was estimated at US$914.8 billion for the 2015 fiscal year. Manhattan has perennially been home to some of the nation's, as well as one of the world's, most marketable real estate, including the Time Warner Center, which had the highest-listed market value in the city in 2006 at US$1.1 billion, to be subsequently surpassed in October 2014 by the Waldorf Astoria New York, which became the most expensive hotel ever sold after being purchased by the Anbang Insurance Group, based in China, for US$1.95 billion. In the same year, six of the top ten most expensive zip codes in the United States by median housing price were located in Manhattan, underscoring the borough's dominant position in the real estate market. When 450 Park Avenue was sold on July 2, 2007, for US$510 million, about US$1,589 per square foot (US$17,104/m^{2}), it broke the barely month-old record for an American office building of US$1,476 per square foot (US$15,887/m^{2}) based on the sale of 660 Madison Avenue. In 2014, Manhattan was home to six of the top ten zip codes in the United States by median housing price. In 2019, the most expensive home sale ever in the United States achieved completion in Midtown Manhattan, at a selling price of US$238 million, for a 24,000-square-foot (2,200 m^{2}) penthouse apartment overlooking Central Park at 220 Central Park South.

The COVID-19 pandemic and hybrid work models have prompted consideration of commercial-to-residential conversion within the neighborhood's real estate sector. In August 2023, Mayor Eric Adams announced a program aimed at creating "a 24/7, live-work, mixed-use neighborhood" in Midtown South though the conversion of commercial and office space to residential, as part of an effort to create 20,000 new residences citywide in a decade.

=== Broadway theatre ===
According to The Broadway League, shows on Broadway sold approximately US$1.54 billion worth of tickets in both the 2022–2023 and 2023–2024 seasons. Both seasons featured theater attendance of approximately 12.3 million each.

=== Former economic operations ===
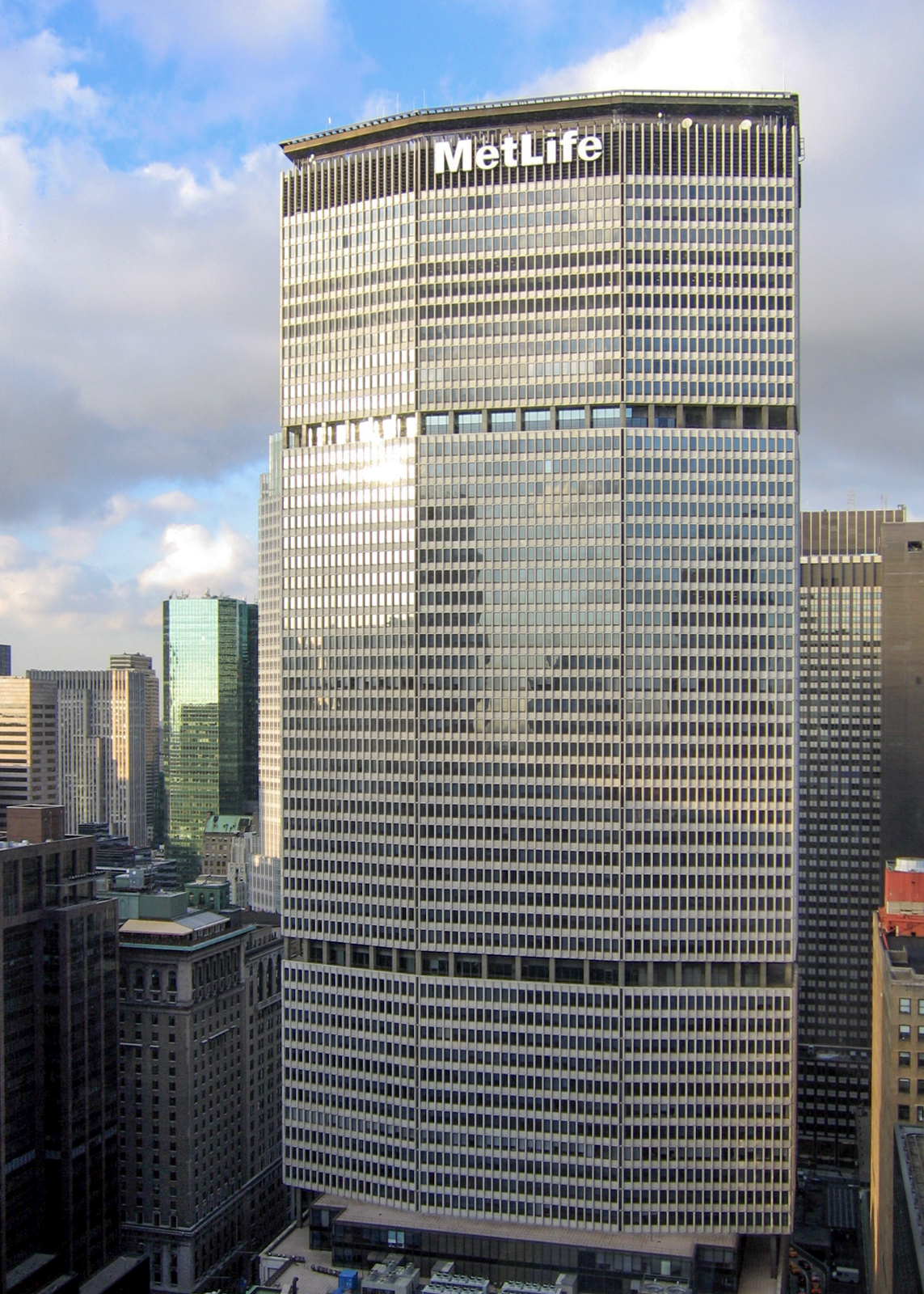
The MetLife Building

Companies that used to have their headquarters in Midtown Manhattan include American Airlines, American Comics Group, American Overseas Airlines, Central Park Media, Eastern Air Lines, GoodTimes Entertainment, LJN, NewKidCo, Pan American World Airways, Philip Morris Companies (now Altria Group), Trans Caribbean Airways, and Trans World Airlines. In 1997, Aer Lingus announced that it was moving its North American headquarters from Midtown to Melville, New York, in Suffolk County on Long Island.

== Demographics ==
Based on data from the 2010 United States census, the population of Midtown Manhattan was 28,630, a change of 2,823 (9.9%) from the 25,807 counted in 2000. Covering an area of 692.81 acres (280.37 ha), the neighborhood had a population density of 41.3 inhabitants per acre (26,400/sq mi; 10,200/km^{2}). The racial makeup of the neighborhood was 64.1% (18,351) White, 4.6% (1,310) African American, 0.1% (34) Native American, 20.8% (5,942) Asian, 0% (8) Pacific Islander, 0.3% (92) from other races, and 2% (569) from two or more races. Hispanic or Latino residents of any race were 8.1% (2,324) of the population.

The entirety of Community District 5, which comprises Midtown Manhattan, had 53,120 inhabitants as of NYC Health's 2018 Community Health Profile, with an average life expectancy of 84.8 years. This is higher than the median life expectancy of 81.2 for all New York City neighborhoods. Most inhabitants are adults: a plurality (45%) are between the ages of 25 and 44, while 22% are between 45 and 64, and 13% are 65 or older. The ratio of youth and college-aged residents was lower, at 7% and 12% respectively.

As of 2017, the median household income in Community Districts 4 and 5 (including Chelsea and Hell's Kitchen) was $101,981, though the median income in Midtown individually was $120,854. In 2018, an estimated 11% of Midtown Manhattan residents lived in poverty, compared to 14% in all of Manhattan and 20% in all of New York City. One in twenty residents (5%) were unemployed, compared to 7% in Manhattan and 9% in New York City. Rent burden, or the percentage of residents who have difficulty paying their rent, is 41% in Midtown Manhattan, compared to the boroughwide and citywide rates of 45% and 51% respectively. Based on this calculation, as of 2018, Midtown Manhattan is considered to be high-income relative to the rest of the city and not gentrifying.

== Police and crime ==
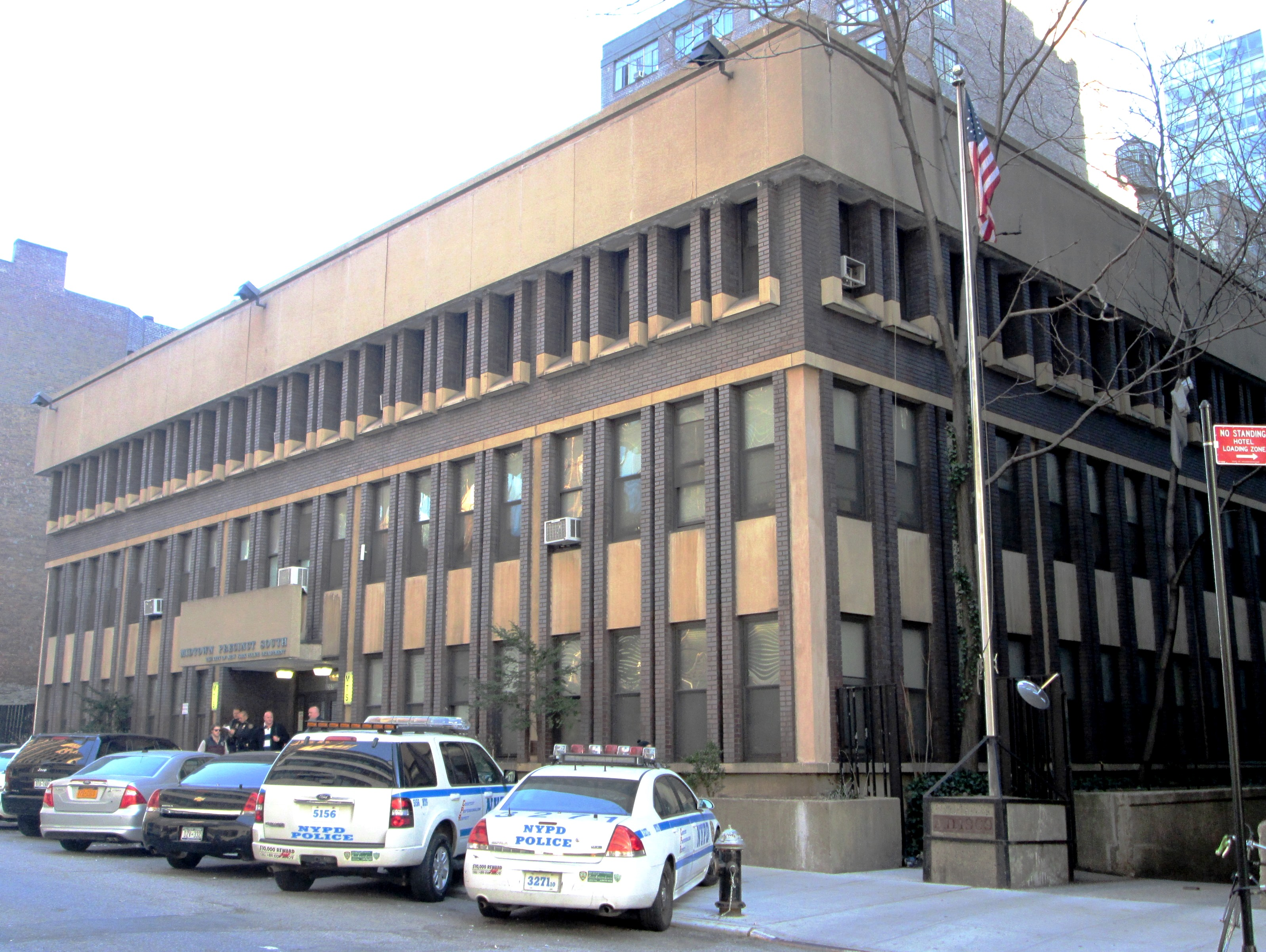
NYPD's 14th (Midtown South) Precinct

Midtown Manhattan is patrolled by two precincts of the NYPD. Midtown North is patrolled by the 18th Precinct, (Note: Officially, the precincts are known as the 14th and 18th Precincts. However, they are respectively publicly referred to as the Midtown South and Midtown North Precincts, making them one of the few unnumbered NYPD precincts in New York City.) located at 306 West 54th Street, while Midtown South is patrolled by the 14th Precinct, located at 357 West 35th Street. The precincts ranked 69th safest out of 69 patrol areas for per-capita crime in 2010. The high per-capita crime rate can be attributed to the low population of the area, as well as the high number of crimes committed against tourists. As of 2018, with a non-fatal assault rate of 25 per 100,000 people, Midtown Manhattan's rate of violent crimes per capita is less than that of the city as a whole. The incarceration rate of 297 per 100,000 people is lower than that of the city as a whole.

The 18th Precinct has a lower crime rate than it did in the 1990s, with crimes across all categories having decreased by 82.1% between 1990 and 2022. The precinct reported 1 murder, 22 rapes, 154 robberies, 185 felony assaults, 205 burglaries, 2,065 grand larcenies, and 116 grand larcenies auto in 2022. The 14th Precinct also has a lower crime rate than in the 1990s, with crimes across all categories having decreased by 81.2% between 1990 and 2022. The precinct reported 8 murders, 23 rapes, 653 robberies, 502 felony assaults, 660 burglaries, 2,375 grand larcenies, and 68 grand larcenies auto in 2022.

== Fire safety ==
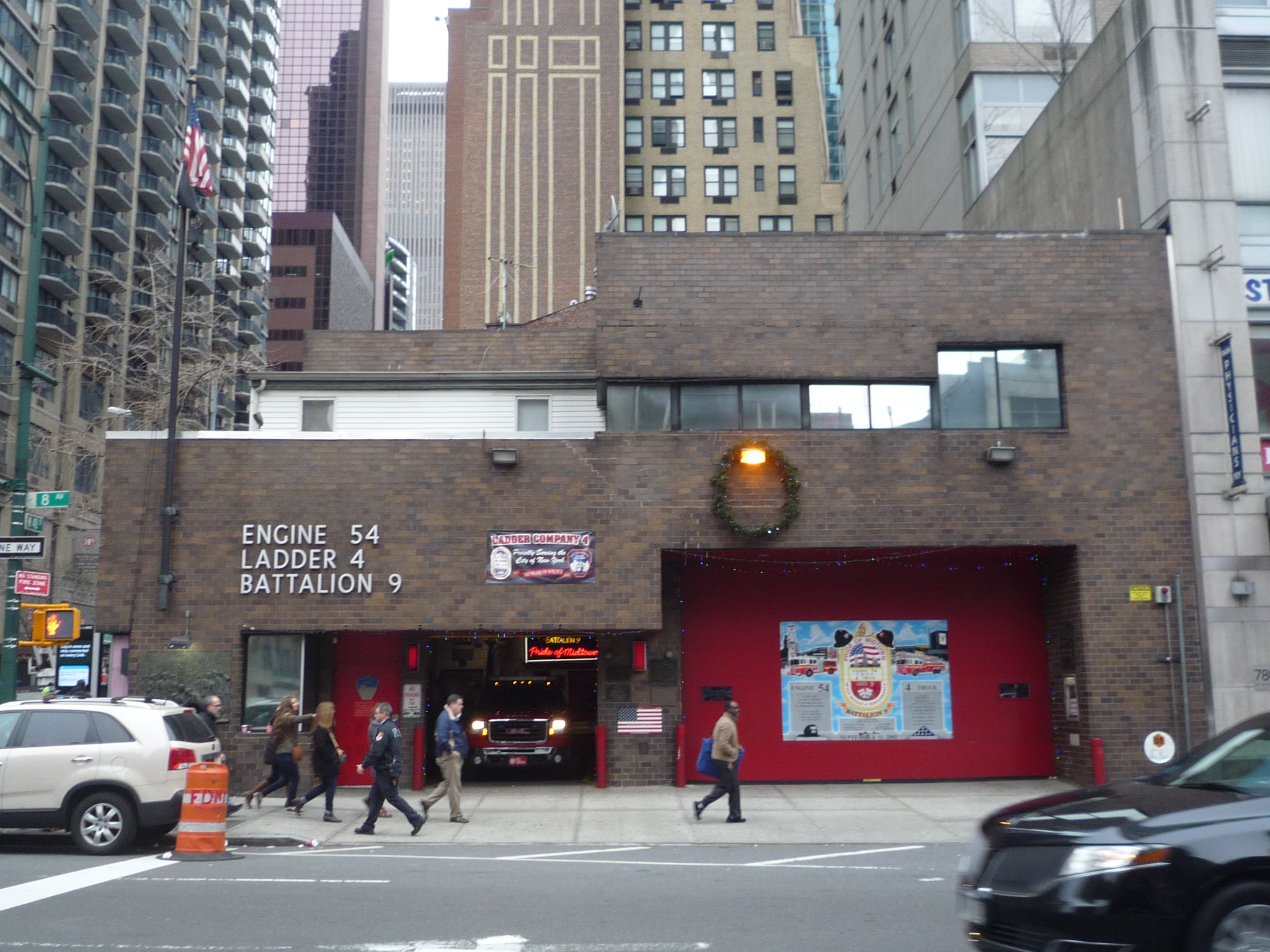
Engine Co. 54/Ladder Co. 4/Battalion 9

The main part of Midtown Manhattan, between 34th and 59th Streets from Lexington Avenue to Eighth Avenue, is served by five fire stations of the New York City Fire Department (FDNY):

- Engine Company 1/Ladder Company 24 – 215 West 38th Street
- Engine Company 23 – 215 West 58th Street
- Engine Company 26 – 222 West 37th Street
- Engine Company 54/Ladder Company 4/Battalion 9 – 782 8th Avenue
- Engine Company 65 – 33 West 43rd Street

The greater Midtown area between 14th Street and 59th Street contains seven additional fire stations.

== Health ==
In 2018, preterm births and births to teenage mothers in Midtown Manhattan were reported as lower than the city average. In Midtown Manhattan, there were 67 preterm births per 1,000 live births (compared to 87 per 1,000 citywide), and 4 births to teenage mothers per 1,000 live births (compared to 19.3 per 1,000 citywide). Midtown Manhattan has a low reported population of residents who are uninsured. In 2018, this population of uninsured residents was estimated to be 11%, slightly less than the citywide rate of 12%.

The concentration of fine particulate matter, the deadliest type of air pollutant, in Midtown Manhattan is 0.0113 milligrams per cubic metre (1.13×10^{−8} oz/ft^{3}), more than the city average. Eleven percent of Midtown Manhattan residents are smokers, which is less than the city average of 14% of residents being smokers. In Midtown Manhattan, 10% of residents are obese, 5% are diabetic, and 18% have high blood pressure—compared to the citywide averages of 24%, 11%, and 28% respectively. In addition, 9% of children are obese, compared to the citywide average of 20%.

Ninety-one percent of residents eat some fruits and vegetables every day, which is higher than the city's average of 87%. In 2018, 86% of residents described their health as "good", "very good", or "excellent", more than the city's average of 78%. For every supermarket in Midtown Manhattan, there are 11 bodegas.

The nearest major hospitals are Mount Sinai West in Hell's Kitchen; the Bellevue Hospital Center and NYU Langone Medical Center in Kips Bay; and NewYork–Presbyterian Hospital on the Upper East Side. In addition, Beth Israel Medical Center in Stuyvesant Town operated until 2025.

== Post offices and ZIP Codes ==
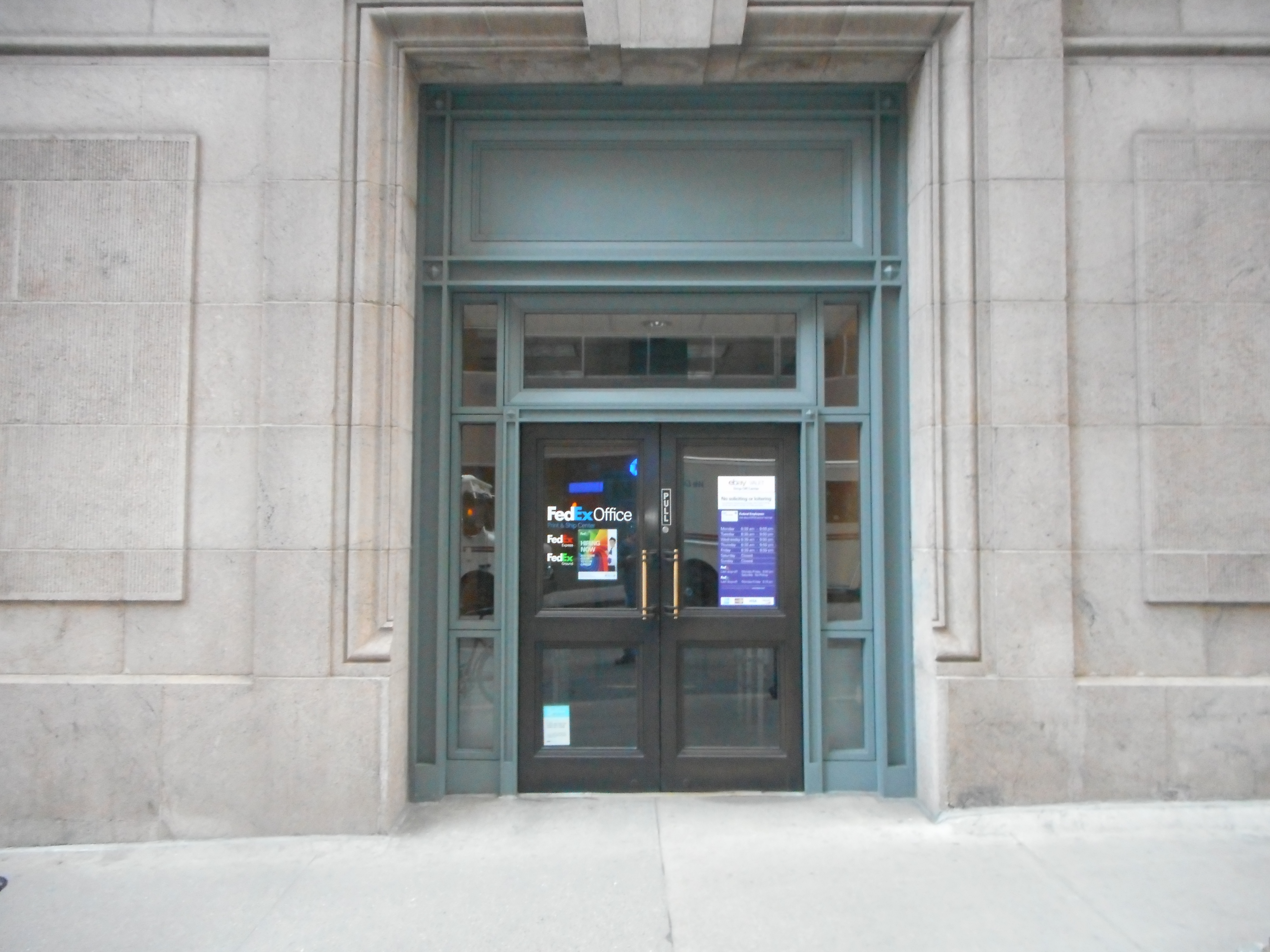
USPS Grand Central Station

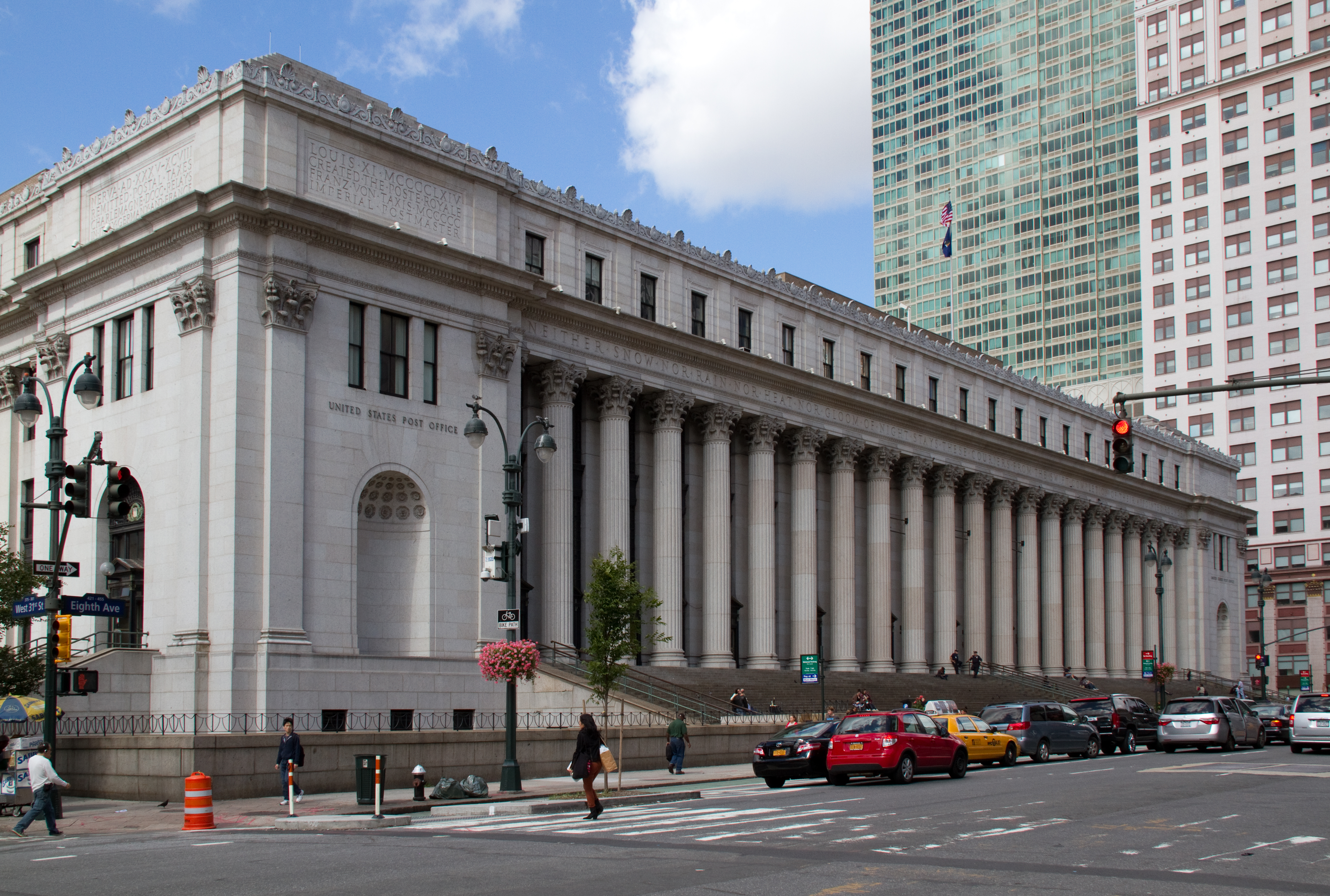
The James A. Farley Building

Midtown Manhattan is located within six primary ZIP Codes. West of Fifth Avenue, Midtown is located in 10018 between 34th and 41st Streets, 10036 between 41st and 48th Streets, and 10019 between 48th and 59th Streets. East of Fifth Avenue, Midtown is located in 10016 between 34th and 40th Streets, 10017 between 40th and 49th Streets, and 10022 between 49th and 59th Streets. The area southwest of Fifth Avenue and 34th Street, sometimes considered to be in Midtown, is part of 10001. Other areas between 14th and 34th Streets are covered by ZIP Codes 10003, 10009, 10010, and 10011, though these are generally not considered to be part of Midtown proper. There are also thirty-three ZIP Codes assigned to individual buildings or building complexes. (Note: These ZIP Codes are: 10020 (Rockefeller Center); 10055 (Park Avenue Plaza); 10103–10107 (respectively 666 Fifth Avenue, 1290 Avenue of the Americas, 1345 Avenue of the Americas, 888 Seventh Avenue, 250 West 57th Street); 10110–10112 (respectively 500 Fifth Avenue, 45 Rockefeller Plaza, 30 Rockefeller Plaza); 10118–10119 (respectively Empire State Building, One Penn Plaza); 10120–10122 (respectively 112 West 34th Street, 2 Penn Plaza, 225 West 34th Street); 10151–10155 (respectively 745 Fifth Avenue, Seagram Building, General Motors Building, 345 Park Avenue, 964 Third Avenue); 10165–10169 (respectively One Grand Central Place, MetLife Building, 245 Park Avenue, Chanin Building, Helmsley Building); 10170–10177 (respectively 420 Lexington Avenue, 299 Park Avenue, 277 Park Avenue, 355 Madison Avenue, Chrysler Building, 521 Fifth Avenue, 551 Fifth Avenue, 250 Park Avenue))

The United States Postal Service operates six post offices in Midtown:

- Appraisers Stores Station – 580 Fifth Avenue
- Bryant Station – 23 West 43rd Street
- Grand Central Station – 450 Lexington Avenue
- Midtown Station – 223 West 38th Street
- Murray Hill Station – 115 East 34th Street
- Rockefeller Center Station – 610 Fifth Avenue

The James A. Farley Station, the city's main post office, is located at 421 8th Avenue. The post office stopped 24-hour service in 2009 due to decreasing mail traffic.

== Education ==
Midtown Manhattan generally has a higher rate of college-educated residents than the rest of the city as of 2018. A majority of residents age 25 and older (78%) have a college education or higher, while 6% have less than a high school education and 17% are high school graduates or have some college education. By contrast, 64% of Manhattan residents and 43% of city residents have a college education or higher. The percentage of Midtown Manhattan students excelling in math rose from 61% in 2000 to 80% in 2011 and reading achievement increased from 66% to 68% during the same time period.

Midtown Manhattan's rate of elementary school student absenteeism is lower than the rest of New York City. In Midtown Manhattan, 19% of elementary school students missed twenty or more days per school year, less than the citywide average of 20%. Additionally, 92% of high school students in Midtown Manhattan graduate on time, more than the citywide average of 75%.

=== Schools ===
There are no public elementary or middle schools in Midtown.

The New York City Department of Education operates the following public high schools in Midtown, serving grades 9–12:

- Jacqueline Kennedy-Onassis High School
- Landmark High School
- Murray Hill Academy
- Repertory Company High School for Theatre Arts
- Satellite Academy High School

Private schools include The Beekman School, Rebecca School, and a number of private languages and music centers (e.g. Berlitz, American Language Communication Center, New York Language Center, Swan Music School, the New York Jazz Workshop, and the New York Youth Symphony). The La Scuola d'Italia Guglielmo Marconi Italian international school moved to West Midtown in 2016.

Community schools include Success Academy Charter School.

=== Libraries ===
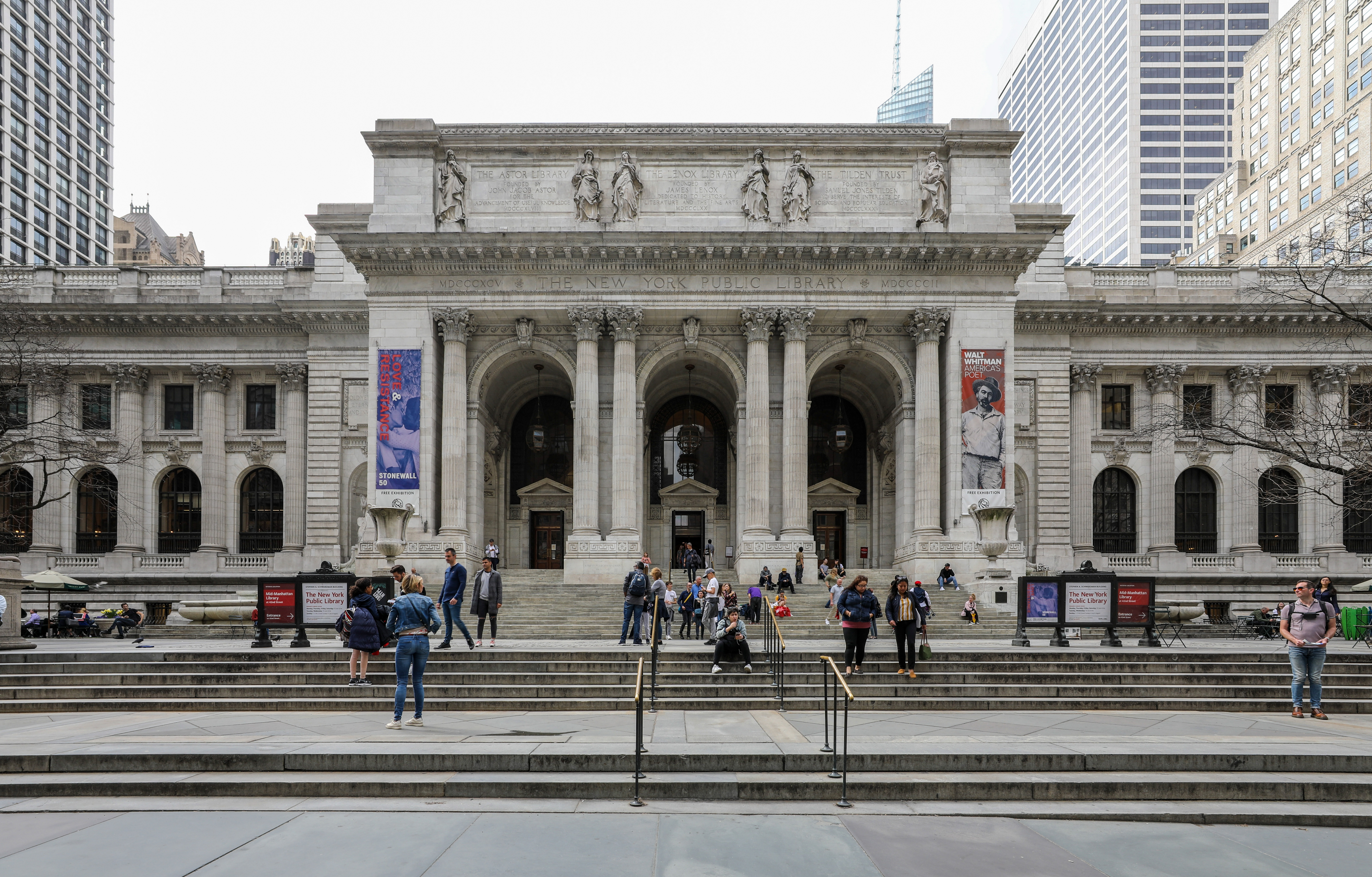
New York Public Library Main Branch

The New York Public Library (NYPL) operates the Stephen A. Schwarzman Building (also the Main Branch), a reference branch at 476 Fifth Avenue. The four-story building, constructed in 1911, is known worldwide for its architecture and has several million items in its collections. There are also five circulating branches in Midtown: (Note: This does not include five additional branches located between 14th and 59th Streets but are not part of Midtown proper. These are the Columbus, Epiphany, Kips Bay, and Muhlenberg branches and the Heiskell Braille and Talking Book Library.)

- The 53rd Street branch is located at 18 West 53rd Street. The three-level branch opened in 2016, replacing the former Donnell Library Center that had been open from 1955 to 2008.
- The 58th Street branch is located at 127 East 58th Street. The branch opened in a Carnegie library building in 1907 and moved to its current two-story space in 1969.
- The Grand Central branch is located at 135 East 46th Street. The two-story library opened in 2008.
- The Stavros Niarchos Foundation Library (or Mid-Manhattan library) at 455 Fifth Avenue re-opened in its current form in 2021 after renovations. Diagonally opposite the Main Branch, it has occupied this site in various forms since 1970.
- The Terence Cardinal Cooke-Cathedral branch is located in the basement of 560 Lexington Avenue, adjacent to the 51st Street subway station. It opened in 1887 and is the second-smallest branch of the NYPL system.

=== Higher education ===
Two campuses of the City University of New York (CUNY)—the doctorate-granting CUNY Graduate Center and the Stella and Charles Guttman Community College—are located in Midtown, while Baruch College, also of the City University of New York, is located in Midtown South. Mercy College is situated at Herald Square.

== Transportation ==
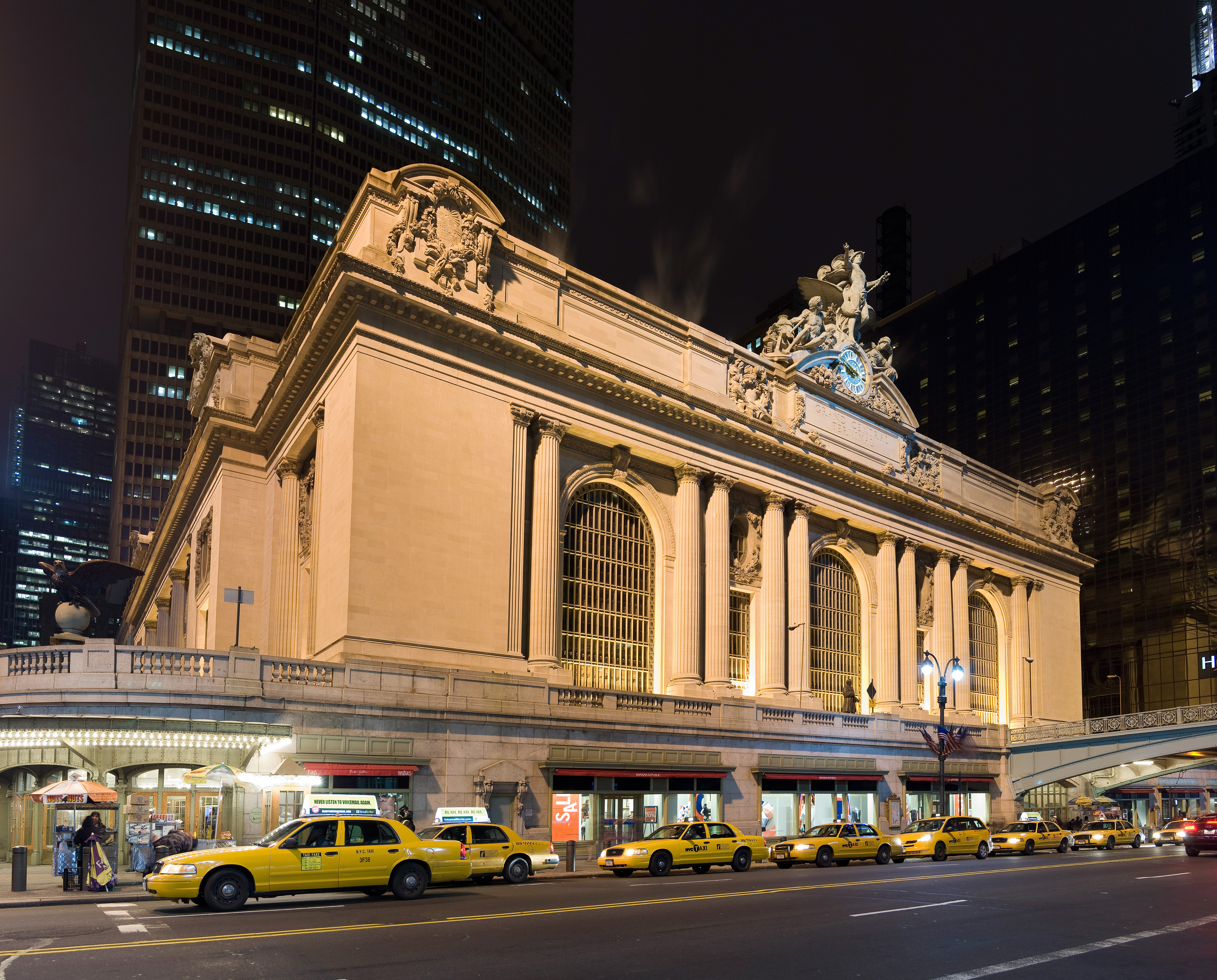
Grand Central Terminal seen from 42nd Street

Pennsylvania Station and Grand Central Terminal are the two major railroad stations located in Midtown Manhattan. Penn Station serves Amtrak, NJ Transit, and the Long Island Rail Road (LIRR), while Grand Central serves the Metro-North Railroad and also serves the LIRR at Grand Central Madison. Penn Station is considered to be the busiest transportation hub in the Western Hemisphere, servicing around 650,000 people per day.

The Port Authority Bus Terminal, located at Eighth Avenue and 41st Street at the western edge of Midtown, is the city's main intercity bus terminal and the world's busiest bus station, serving 250,000 passengers on 7,000 buses each workday. The building opened in 1950 and had been designed to accommodate 60,000 daily passengers. A 2021 plan announced by the Port Authority would spend $10 billion to expand capacity and modernize the facility.

The New York City Subway and MTA Regional Bus Operations each operate several routes that go through Midtown. Additionally, the PATH train to New Jersey terminates at 33rd Street and Sixth Avenue in Midtown.

Traffic congestion is common, especially for crosstown traffic. In 2011, a new system of traffic light control, known as "Midtown in Motion", was announced, with the aim of reducing traffic congestion. Approximately 750,000 vehicles enter Midtown Manhattan on a fall business day. According to the 2011 Traffic Data Report for New York State, 777,527 vehicles a day went through select toll facilities into Manhattan.

== Government infrastructure ==
The New York Supreme Court, Appellate Division, First Department, is located at the Appellate Division Courthouse at 25th Street and Madison Avenue, which was completed in 1900 by architect James Brown Lord, who used a third of the construction budget to decorate the building with statues and murals. The Puerto Rico Federal Affairs Administration operates its New York office on the 22nd floor at 135 West 50th Street.

== Diplomatic missions ==
Several countries, including Algeria, Argentina, The Bahamas, China, Costa Rica, Germany, Ireland, Israel, Jamaica, Japan, Luxembourg, Mexico, Morocco, Saudi Arabia, Singapore, South Africa, South Korea, Ukraine, and the United Kingdom, have permanent missions accredited to the United Nations, and consulates-general accredited to the United States, in Midtown Manhattan. In addition, the Taipei Economic and Cultural Office of the Republic of China (Taiwan) is in Midtown Manhattan.

== See also ==
- East Side (Manhattan)
- History of Manhattan
- History of New York City
- Lower Manhattan
- Manhattanhenge
- Upper Manhattan
- West Side (Manhattan)
