= New York Jazz Workshop =

Music school

- Founded: 2008
- Founders: Marc Mommaas, Marco Chelo
- Type: Music school
- Headquarters: Midtown Manhattan, New York City
- Location: 265 West 37th Street, New York, NY 10018
- Coordinates: 40.7540°N 73.9916°W
- Website: newyorkjazzworkshop.com

The New York Jazz Workshop (NYJW) is a community-based jazz music school in Midtown Manhattan, New York City, founded in 2008 by tenor saxophonist and educator Marc Mommaas and entrepreneur Marco Chelo. The school offers weekly ensemble workshops, private instrumental and vocal lessons, summer intensives, and international music programs. Its faculty includes musicians affiliated with the Manhattan School of Music, The New School, NYU, Columbia University, and Juilliard, as well as Grammy Award winners and nominees.

== History ==
The school began operations in the summer of 2009 with its first "Summer Summit," featuring an improvisation and rhythm workshop led by Mommaas and drummer Tony Moreno, and a guitar workshop led by guitarist Vic Juris. Mommaas, a Dutch-born saxophonist who studied at the Manhattan School of Music on a full scholarship and received the William H. Borden Award, had previously released albums on Sunnyside Records.

The school initially operated on West 46th Street near Times Square before relocating to its current facility at 265 West 37th Street in Midtown Manhattan. NYJW has organized student concerts in collaboration with Smalls Jazz Club, a jazz venue in Greenwich Village.

In 2016, Time Out placed NYJW as one of "The best places to take guitar lessons in NYC."

== Programs ==
=== Weekly workshops and lessons ===
NYJW offers ongoing weekly ensemble classes for adults organized by skill level and musical style, covering genres including bebop, Brazilian music, blues, jazz standards, and Afro-Cuban jazz. The school also provides private lessons in all instruments and voice, as well as courses in music theory, ear training, composition, and counterpoint.

=== Summer intensives ===
The school has run annual summer intensive programs since its founding, covering improvisation, guitar, piano, Brazilian music, bebop, and vocal performance.

=== International programs ===
NYJW operates international music programs in multiple countries. The Jazz Improvisation Camp in Italy, held annually in the hills of Tuscany, combines intensive jazz study with cultural excursions and was featured in DownBeat magazine's guide to international jazz camps. The Italian concerts associated with the program have been covered by La Nazione and Il Tirreno, Italian newspapers reporting on NYJW performances at the Poggio Salamartano venue in Fucecchio. The City of Fucecchio has promoted NYJW concerts as official municipal cultural events.

NYJW has also been represented at the Otsu Jazz Festival in Japan and has been listed by AndVision, a Japanese music study-abroad platform, as a recommended program.

== International collaborations ==
In 2014 and 2015, NYJW partnered with Boğaziçi University in Istanbul, Turkey, to conduct multi-day jazz workshops. The collaboration, organized with the university's Music Club, brought NYJW faculty including Mommaas, Tony Moreno, Kenny Wesse, and vocalist Fay Victor to teach improvisation, rhythm, guitar, and vocal workshops, culminating in a concert at the university's Albert Long Hall.

NYJW also collaborated on the Apollonia Jazz Workshop in North Macedonia, a joint initiative with the Apollonia Foundation, the Skopje Jazz Festival, and conservatories in Skopje.

The school is listed as a member organization of the Europe Jazz Network, the Europe-wide association of jazz presenters and producers.

== Notable faculty ==
- Joe Fonda - Bassist known for his work with Anthony Braxton
- Amina Figarova - Pianist and composer.
- Yvonnick Prené - Harmonicist.
- Patience Higgins - Saxophonist and multi-reed musician who performed with the Duke Ellington Orchestra and was featured on Dee Dee Bridgewater's double Grammy-winning album Dear Ella.
- Jean-Michel Pilc - Pianist.
- Kenny Wessel - Guitarist who toured with Ornette Coleman's Prime Time ensemble for over 12 years.
- Doug Beavers - Grammy Award-winning trombonist known for his work with Spanish Harlem Orchestra.
- Carlos Maldonado - a member of the Grammy Award-winning Arturo O'Farrill's Afro Latin Jazz Orchestra since 2013, who has performed at Birdland, the Blue Note, and the Village Vanguard.
- Vitor Gonçalves - Grammy-nominated pianist and accordionist.
- Jim Ridl - Pianist and a member of the Mingus Big Band.
- Gabriel Vicéns – Guitarist and composer, recipient of a 2023 Chamber Music America New Jazz Works commission.
- Chien Chien Lu – Vibraphonist named one of the Recording Academy's 10 Emerging Jazz Artists of 2023.
