= Patience Higgins =

American musician

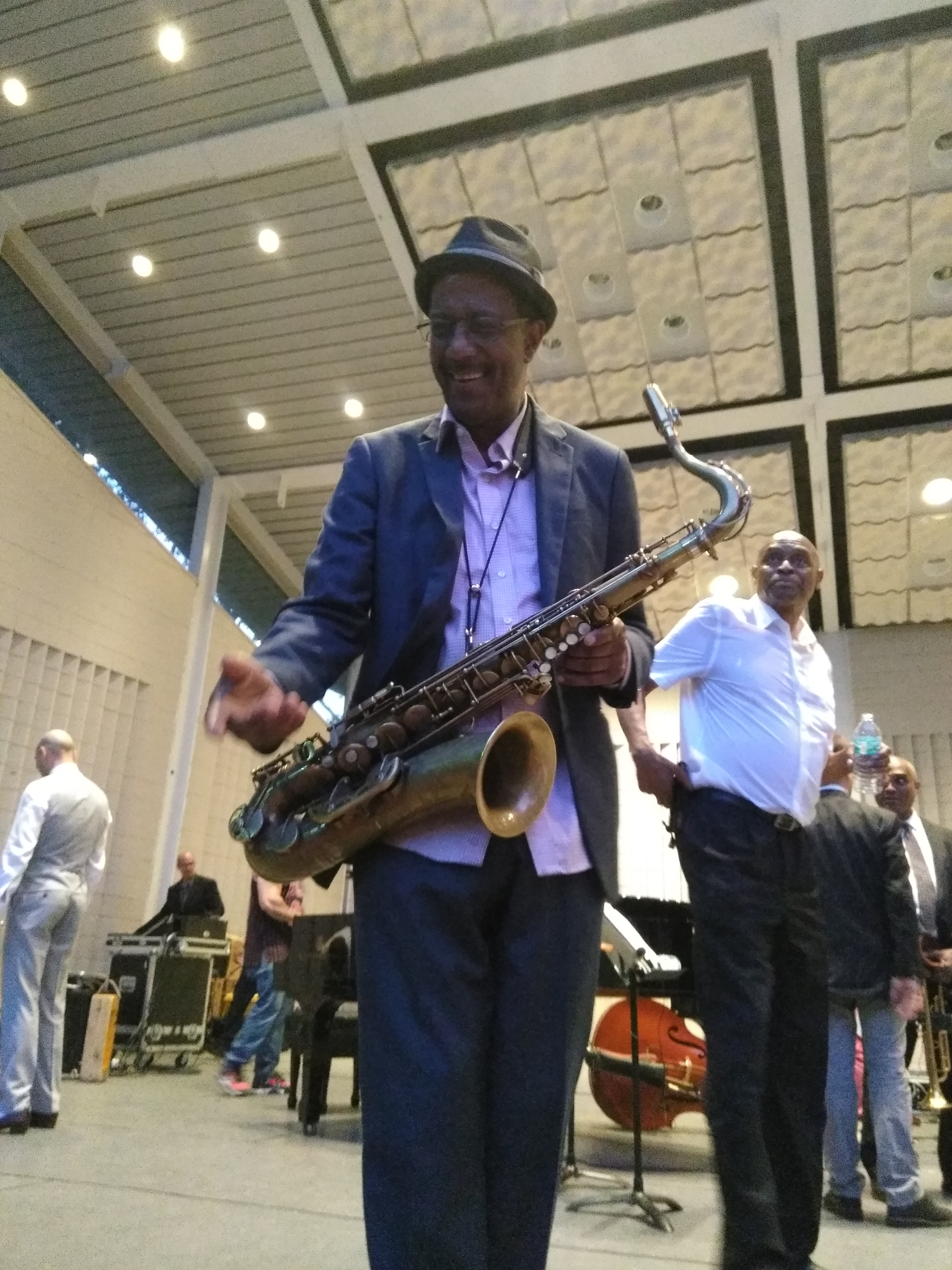

Background information
- Born: Greenville, South Carolina, United States
- Genres: Jazz; swing; bebop; gospel
- Occupations: Instrumentalist, music educator
- Instruments: Saxophone, flute, clarinet, oboe, French horn

Patience Higgins is a New York-based jazz saxophonist, flutist, and multi-reed musician. He also plays clarinet, oboe, and English horn. He has performed with Duke Ellington Orchestra, Barry Harris, Archie Shepp, Jimmy Scott, Stevie Wonder, Ray Charles, Dee Dee Bridgewater, Paquito D’Rivera, Cleo Laine, and The Sugar Hill Jazz Quartet. Higgins has a history as a Broadway musician. He is a music educator and teaches at the New York Jazz Workshop Music School. Higgins has toured with the Duke Ellington and Count Basie Orchestras.

In 1998 he was featured artist playing saxophone and flute for double Grammy Award-winning recording Dee Dee Bridgewater's Dear Ella.

Higgins along with the Sugar Hill Quartet were the house band for the Lenox Lounge, and regular Monday night sessions at St. Nick's Pub in Harlem. His 1998 album 'Live in Harlem' documents Monday night sessions at St. Nick's Pub.

== Career ==
Higgins has also performed with the Duke Ellington Band under the direction of Mercer Ellington, and Paul Ellington. He has been a member of the Duke Ellington Band for over twenty years. He has toured and recorded with Frank Foster, Rodney Kendrick, Yoko Ono, Cleo Laine and The Sugar Hill Jazz Quartet, Vanessa Rubin, Dee Dee Bridgewater, The Pointer Sisters, Don Byron, Hamiett Bluiett, The Boys Choir of Harlem, Nicolas Payton, David Murray, Aretha Franklin, Savion Glover, Ray Charles, Lionel Hampton, Sam Rivers, Charles Tolliver, Sam and Dave, Bobby Watson & Tailor Made, Archie Shepp, Wilson Pickett, Barry Harris, Muhal Richard Abrams, Stevie Wonder, Paquito D’Rivera, James Zollar, Bobby Short, Chip White, Wilson Pickett, Joey DeFrancesco, Kiane Zawadi, Eli Fountain, Leopaldo Fleming.

== Discography ==
=== Album appearances ===
Year	Album	Artist	Instrument(s)
2018	The Atomic Bomb Blues	The Dave Taylor Octet / Dave Taylor	Oboe, Sax (Baritone), Sax (Tenor), Soloist
2017	Splendor in the Grass/The Manchurian Candidate [Original Motion Picture Soundtrack]	David Amram	Saxophone
2017	Run- 'N Fly	Run- 'N Fly	Saxophone
2015	All My Tomorrows	Steve Cromity	Guest Artist, Flute, Sax (Soprano), Sax (Tenor)
2015	Building Up the Kingdom	M. Roger Holland	Clarinet
2013	Golden Age	Mister Fred	Oboe
2012	Thoughts on God	Eric Person	Clarinet, Sax (Tenor), Soloist
2010	A Second Chance	Dorothy Leigh	Clarinet (Bass), Flute, Sax (Baritone)
2010	The Tinderbox Musical		Sax (Baritone)
2010	What Is Love?	Queen Esther	Sax (Tenor)
2009	More Dedications	Chip White	Alto, Flute, Sax (Soprano)
2008	Me, Marsalis & Monk	Whitney Marchelle	Main Personnel, Sax (Soprano)
2007	Down for You	Darby Dizard	Clarinet
2005	Broadway's Greatest Gifts: Carols for a Cure, Vol. 7		Sax (Alto)
2005	Underneath a Brooklyn Moon	J.C. Hopkins Biggish Band	Main Personnel, Sax (Tenor), Soloist
2004	I'm Not a Sometime Thing	Carol Mennie	Main Personnel, Reeds, Saxophone
2004	Vignettes in the Spirit of Ellington	Jabbo Ware	Clarinet (Bass), Sax (Baritone)
2003	Avenue Q		Flute, Clarinet, Sax (Alto)
2003	Organized!	Swingadelic	Sax (Alto), Group Member
2002	Blueblack	Hamiet Bluiett	Clarinet (Bass), Sax (Baritone)
2001	Aftermath	Mike Longo / Mike Longo & the New York State of the Art Jazz Band	Reeds
2001	Lifeline	Suzanne Couch	Sax (Tenor)
2001	A Great Day in C'Ville: Jazz from the Piedmont		Sax (Baritone)
2000	Boogie Boo!	Swingadelic	Sax (Baritone)
1999	I	Theorcolus	Flute, Clarinet (Bass), Sax (Alto)
1998	3 A.M.	Rich Shemaria	Flute (Alto), Sax (Baritone)
1998	Libation for the Baritone Saxophone Nation	Bluiett Baritone Saxophone Group / Hamiet Bluiett	Sax (Baritone), Composer
1998	Live in Harlem	Patience Higgins	Primary Artist, Sax (Tenor)
1998	Potpourri	DMP Big Band	Multi Instruments
1998	Swingin' with Legends	Angela DeNiro	Flute, Clarinet, Clarinet (Bass), Sax (Baritone)
1997	DMP Big Band Salutes Duke Ellington	DMP Big Band	Sax (Tenor), Group Member
1997	Dear Ella	Dee Dee Bridgewater	Sax (Baritone)
1997	He Leadeth Me	Cissy Houston	Sax (Baritone)
1997	Live at the Knitting Factory	Bluiett Baritone Saxophone Group	Sax (Baritone)
1997	No Way to Treat a Lady		Flute, Clarinet, Clarinet (Bass), Oboe, Sax (Tenor)
1997	Waves of Peace	Nancie Banks	Flute, Saxophone
1995	Carved in Stone	DMP Big Band	Flute, Clarinet, Saxophone
1995	Heritage Is	James Jabbo Ware & the Me We & Them Orchestra	Clarinet, Sax (Baritone)
1995	Last Chance for Common Sense	Rodney Kendrick	Clarinet (Bass), Horn (English), Sax (Baritone)
1995	New York Rock [Original Cast]	Yoko Ono	Flute, Saxophone
1995	One Line, Two Views	Muhal Richard Abrams	tenor saxophone, bass clarinet, percussion, voice
1995	South of the Border	David Murray	Saxophone, Sax (Soprano), Sax (Tenor), Soloist
1994	Live at the Village Vanguard	Hamiet Bluiett	Composer
1994	Bert's Blues	Nancie Banks Orchestra	Sax (Tenor)
1994	Remembering Billy Strayhorn	Errol Parker	Sax (Bass)
1994	Solitude	Cleo Laine	Sax (Alto)
1993	Dance, World, Dance	Rodney Kendrick	Clarinet (Bass), Sax (Baritone)
1993	Family Talk	Muhal Richard Abrams	Clarinet, Clarinet (Bass), Horn (English), Sax (Tenor), Horn
1993	Pieces of Woo: The Other Side	Bernie Worrell	Clarinet
1993	Tailor Made	Bobby Watson	Clarinet, Saxophone, Sax (Tenor)
1992	Help Is Coming	Chuck Metcalf Octet Featuring Patience Higgins	Sax (Tenor), Flute
1992	David Murray Big Band	David Murray	Sax (Soprano), Sax (Tenor)
1991	Blu Blu Blu	Muhal Richard Abrams	Flute, Clarinet, Sax (Baritone)
1991	Errol Parker Tentet	Errol Parker	Sax (Baritone)
1990	Where Were You?	Joey DeFrancesco	Sax (Tenor)
1989	Music Is My Mistress	Duke Ellington & His Orchestra	Sax (Tenor)
1989	The Hearinga Suite	Muhal Richard Abrams / The Muhal Richard Abrams Orchestra	Clarinet (Bass), Sax (Tenor)
1989	Music Masters Jazz Sampler		Sax (Tenor)
1986	Country Girl	Amina Claudine Myers	Flute, Sax (Soprano), Sax (Alto)
1983	Rejoicing with the Light	Muhal Richard Abrams / The Muhal Richard Abrams Orchestra	Clarinet, Clarinet (Alto), Sax (Baritone)
1982	Colours	Sam Rivers Winds of Manhattan	Flute, Sax (Baritone)
1979	Attica Blues Big Band	Archie Shepp	Main Personnel, Flute, Saxophone, Wind
1976	The Runaways [Original Soundtrack]	Original Broadway Cast	Flute, Saxophone, Improvisation, Primary Artist

== Movie Soundtracks ==
- The Cotton Club
- School Daze
- Awakenings
- Soul to Soul
- Baby Boy

== Theater Credits ==
- AVE Q, DREAMGIRLS
- THE WIZ
- AIN’T MISBHEVIN’
- BUBBLING BROWN SUGAR
- BLACK & BLUE
- RUNAWAYS
- HAIR
- SOPHISTICATED LADIES
- JELLY’S LAST JAM
- 5 GUYS NAMED MOE
- CHICAGO

== Jazz Festivals ==
- NORTH SEA
- PORI
- MONTREAUX
- JVC
- NANCY
- WILLASAU
- VIENNE
- BERLIN
- PLAY BOY
- MONTEREY
- NEWPORT
- GLASKOW
- COPENHAGEN
- MONTREAL
- JAZZ HERITAGE in New Orleans.
- CHARLIE PARKER JAZZ FESTIVAL (in New York City)
