= Family Talk =

Studio album by Muhal Richard Abrams
- Released: 1993
- Recorded: 26–27 February & 1 March 1993
- Genre: Jazz
- Length: 72:05
- Label: Black Saint
- Producer: Flavio Bonandrini

Muhal Richard Abrams chronology
Blu Blu Blu (1991)	Family Talk (1993)	Think All, Focus One (1994)

Family Talk is an album by Muhal Richard Abrams released on the Italian Black Saint label in 1993 and features performances of six of Abrams compositions by Abrams, Jack Walrath, Patience Higgins, Brad Jones, Warren Smith and Reggie Nicholson.

== Reception ==
The Allmusic review by Scott Yanow awarded the album 4 1/2 stars stating "This CD has such intriguing writing by Muhal Richard Abrams for his sextet that the group sounds like an orchestra at times ... This is one of Muhal Richard Abrams' better-known combo sessions."

The Penguin Guide to Jazz awarded the album 3 1/2 stars calling it "A fine record which transcends individual contributions".

Professional ratings
Review scores
Source	Rating
Allmusic	4.5/5 stars
The Penguin Guide to Jazz	3.5/4 stars

== Track listing ==
All compositions by Muhal Richard Abrams

1. "Meditation 1" - 4:35
2. "Drumbutu" - 17:21
3. "DizBirdMonkBudMax (A Tribute)" - 15:48
4. "FamilyTalk" - 13:47
5. "Illuso" - 15:15
6. "Sound Image of the Past, Present and Future" - 5:19
- Recorded February 26–27 & March 1, 1993, at Sear Sound, New York City

== Personnel ==
- Jack Walrath - trumpet
- Patience Higgins - bass clarinet, tenor saxophone, English horn
- Brad Jones - bass
- Warren Smith - vibes, timpani, marimba, gongs
- Reggie Nicholson - drums, marimba, bells
- Muhal Richard Abrams - piano, synthesizer, conductor
