= The Hearinga Suite =

Studio album by Muhal Richard Abrams
- Released: 1989
- Recorded: 17–18 January 1989
- Genre: Jazz
- Length: 41:05
- Label: Black Saint
- Producer: Muhal Richard Abrams

Muhal Richard Abrams chronology
Colors in Thirty-Third (1988)	The Hearinga Suite (1989)	Blu Blu Blu (1990)

The Hearinga Suite is an album by Muhal Richard Abrams released on the Italian Black Saint label in 1989 and features performances of seven of Abrams compositions by an eighteen-member orchestra. Abrams dedicated the music on the album to Steve McCall and Donald Raphael Garrett.

== Reception ==
The Allmusic review by Scott Yanow awarded the album 4½ stars stating "Pianist Muhal Richard Abrams leads an 18-piece orchestra on his seven originals that make up the Hearinga Suite. Much of the music is quite adventurous, although "Oldfotalk" is fairly conventional. Although the personnel includes such fine players as trumpeters Jack Walrath and Cecil Bridgewater and saxophonists John Purcell and Marty Ehrlich, the emphasis is on group interplay and the colorful arrangements. Throughout this very interesting set, Abrams shows how a big band can logically be utilized in freer forms of jazz. ". The Penguin Guide to Jazz awarded the album 3½ stars stating "This marks something of a quantum shift, a move towards something larger and more cohesive. The spirit of Ellington is not far away here".

Professional ratings
Review scores
Source	Rating
Allmusic	4.5/5 stars
The Penguin Guide to Jazz	3.5/4 stars

== Track listing ==
All compositions by Muhal Richard Abrams

1. "Hearinga" - 5:11
2. "Conversations With the Three of Me" - 5:45
3. "Seesall" - 5:28
4. "Aura of Thought- Things" - 4:36
5. "Oldfotalk" - 6:43
6. "Finditnow" - 6:27
7. "Bermix" - 6:55
- Recorded January 17 & 18, 1989 at A & R Recording Studios, New York City

== Personnel ==
- Ron Tooley - trumpet
- Jack Walrath - trumpet
- Cecil Bridgewater - trumpet
- Frank Gordon - trumpet
- Clifton Anderson - trombone
- Dick Griffin - trombone
- Jack Jeffers - bass trombone
- Bill Lowe - bass trombone
- John Purcell - flute, clarinet, tenor saxophone
- Marty Ehrlich - piccolo, flute, clarinet, alto saxophone
- Patience Higgins - bass clarinet, tenor saxophone
- Courtnay Winter - bassoon, bass clarinet, tenor saxophone
- Charles Davis - baritone saxophone, soprano saxophone
- Diedre Murray - cello
- Fred Hopkins - bass
- Warren Smith - glockenspiel, vibes, percussion
- Andrew Cyrille - drums
- Muhal Richard Abrams - piano, synthesizer, conductor
