= GTO: Gangsters Takin' Over =

Studio album by Oran "Juice" Jones
- Released: October 1987
- Recorded: 1986–1987
- Genre: R&B
- Label: Def Jam/Columbia
- Producers: Russell Simmons, Vincent F. Bell

Oran "Juice" Jones chronology
Juice (1986)	GTO: Gangsters Takin' Over (1987)	To Be Immortal (1989)

Professional ratings
Review scores
Source	Rating
Allmusic	link
New Musical Express	7/10

GTO: Gangsters Takin' Over is the second album released by Oran "Juice" Jones. It was released in 1987 through Def Jam Recordings and was produced entirely by Russell Simmons and Vincent Bell. GTO failed to find the same success as his previous album, only making it to 36 on the Top R&B/Hip-Hop Albums chart, and the album's only charting single, "Cold Spendin' My Money" wasn't much of a success either, only making it to 41 on the Hot R&B/Hip-Hop Singles & Tracks.

== Track listing ==
1. "Cold Spendin' My Money"- 4:24
2. "Not on the Outside"- 4:28
3. "You Don't Miss the Rain"- 4:14
4. "How to Love Again"- 4:42 (Featuring Alyson Williams)
5. "We Were Friends"- 3:53
6. "I Just Can't Say Goodbye"- 3:47
7. "Rock the Night Away"- 4:18
8. "Baby Don't Walk Out on Me"- 4:24
9. "Your Song"- 4:36
10. "U Bring Out"- 4:02
