= The Rain (Oran "Juice" Jones song) =

1986 single by Oran "Juice" Jones

Single by Oran "Juice" Jones

from the album Juice
- B-side: "Your Song"
- Released: September 1986
- Length: 5:07 (7-inch version); 3:14 (radio edit)
- Label: Def Jam
- Songwriter: Vincent Bell
- Producers: Russell Simmons; Vincent Bell

Oran "Juice" Jones singles chronology
"1.2.1." (1986)	"The Rain" (1986)	"You Can't Hide from Love" (1986)

Music video
- "The Rain" on YouTube

"The Rain" is a song by American R&B singer Oran "Juice" Jones, released from his debut album, Juice. The song's lyrics involve a man confronting his lover regarding her infidelity. At the end of the track is a long recitation written by Vincent Bell, who also composed the music. The song's music video features actress Danita Davis as Jones' girlfriend.

== Reception ==
The single was Jones's biggest hit; it reached number one on the US Billboard Hot Black Singles for two weeks, making it the first number-one R&B hit issued by the then newly created Def Jam record label. The single also peaked at number nine on the Billboard Hot 100. Outside the United States, "The Rain" reached number four on the UK Singles Chart, and was nominated for Best R&B Vocal Performance, Male at the 29th Annual Grammy Awards in 1987. Jones never had another Hot 100 hit, and left the music business after his third album failed to chart. "The Rain" is ranked number 63 on VH1's 100 Greatest One-Hit Wonders of the '80s.

== Charts ==
=== Weekly charts ===
Weekly chart performance for "The Rain"
Chart (1986–1987)	Peak position
Australia (Kent Music Report)	85
Austria (Ö3 Austria Top 40)	16
Belgium (Ultratop 50 Flanders)	6
Canada Top Singles (RPM)	8
Europe (European Hot 100 Singles)	11
Greece (IFPI)	2
Ireland (IRMA)	6
Netherlands (Dutch Top 40)	5
Netherlands (Single Top 100)	10
New Zealand (Recorded Music NZ)	22
Switzerland (Schweizer Hitparade)	12
UK Singles (Official Charts)	4
US Billboard Hot 100	9
US 12-inch Singles Sales (Billboard); Remix	5
US Dance/Disco Club Play (Billboard); Remix	7
US Hot Black Singles (Billboard)	1
West Germany (GfK)	3

=== Year-end charts ===
Year-end chart performance for "The Rain"
Chart (1986)	Position
UK Singles (OCC)	73
US 12-inch Singles Sales (Billboard)	36
US Hot Black Singles (Billboard)	16

Chart (1987)	Position
Belgium (Ultratop 50 Flanders)	91
Netherlands (Dutch Top 40)	58
Netherlands (Single Top 100)	50
West Germany (Media Control)	37

== Certifications ==
Certifications for "The Rain"
Region	Certification	Certified units/sales
Canada (Music Canada)	Gold	50,000^{^}
United Kingdom (BPI)	Silver	250,000^{^}
United States (RIAA)	Gold	500,000^{^}
^{^} Shipments figures based on certification alone.

== Answer records ==
Several answer records were recorded after the success of "The Rain". All were released in 1986. “Thunder & Lightning”, performed by Miss Thang, was released by Tommy Boy Records. "Walkin in the Rain, Yes You Saw Me" by Pamala was released by Evejim Records. "The Drain", recorded by Leot Littlepage, was released on Select Records.

== In popular culture ==
- In 2018, Donald Glover parodied the song in a Saturday Night Live sketch written by and co-starring cast member Cecily Strong and also featuring Kenan Thompson. Glover played "Raz P. Berry," singing "The Night (I Watched You)." Instead of ending with the usual string of threats and revenge, the whole song turns out to be a disastrous case of mistaken identity.
- A Vietnamese remake of the song, called Chia tay trong mưa (literally Farewell in the rain), performed by singer Phương Thanh, was later featured in the 2026 Rockstar's video game Grand Theft Auto VI as the song in the fictional Kaleidoscope FM radio station. This remake was very famous when YouTuber IShowSpeed found it while playing the game.
