= Vanessa Rubin =

American jazz vocalist (born 1957)

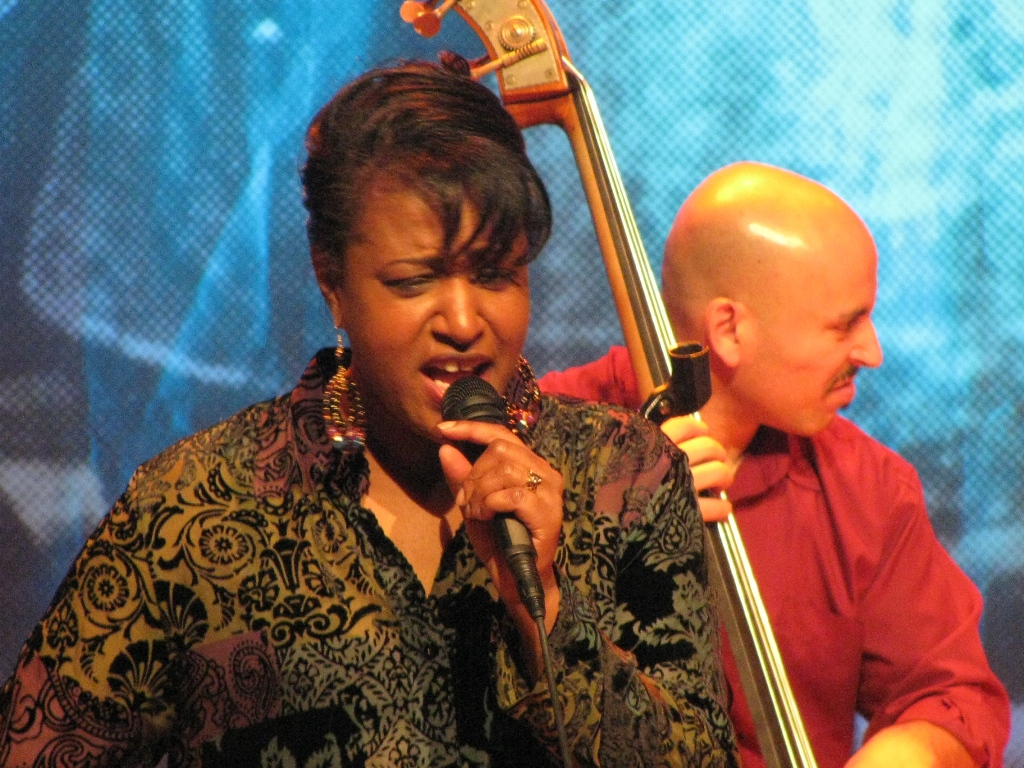

Background information
- Born: March 14, 1957 (age 69); Cleveland, Ohio, U.S.
- Genres: Jazz, R&B
- Occupation: Singer
- Years active: 1980s–present
- Labels: Telarc, RCA, Novus

Vanessa Rubin (born March 14, 1957) is an American jazz vocalist.

== Biography ==
Born in Cleveland, Ohio, Rubin went to Ohio State University for post-secondary education. She wanted to pursue a career as a singer after the Miss Black Central Ohio Contest. Leading up to the 1980s, Rubin was a musician in Cleveland and New York City.

Rubin has been described as "an impressive song stylist with a Midas touch for challenging material", and her 2019 tribute to Tadd Dameron, The Dream Is You: Vanessa Rubin Sings Tadd Dameron, was nominated for the 51st NAACP Image Award for Outstanding Jazz Album.

== Discography ==
| Year | Title | Genre | Label | Billboard |
|---|---|---|---|---|
| 1992 | Soul Eyes | Jazz | Novus/RCA | 9 |
| 1993 | Pastiche | Jazz | Novus/RCA | 10 |
| 1994 | I'm Glad There Is You: A Tribute to Carmen McRae | Jazz | Novus/RCA | 22 |
| 1995 | Vanessa Rubin Sings | Jazz | Novus/RCA | |
| 1997 | New Horizons | R&B, Jazz | RCA | 48 |
| 1999 | Language of Love | Jazz | Telarc | |
| 2001 | Girl Talk | Jazz | Telarc | |
| 2013 | Vanessa Rubin & Don Braden Full Circle | Jazz | Creative Perspective | |
| 2019 | The Dream Is You: Vanessa Rubin Sings Tadd Dameron | Jazz | Nibur | |
