= David Murray discography =

David Murray live in Amsterdam around 1980

David Murray appears on hundreds of recordings as a leader and performer. This discography covers albums released under his name, by groups he was/is a member of and other albums he has contributed to.

== As leader/co-leader ==
Year recorded	Title	Label	Year released	Personnel/Notes
1976	Flowers for Albert	India Navigation	1976	Quartet: Olu Dara, Fred Hopkins, Phillip Wilson
1976	Low Class Conspiracy	Adelphi	1976	Trio: Fred Hopkins, Phillip Wilson
1976	Live at Peace Church	Danola Records	1991	Trio: Fred Hopkins, Stanley Crouch
1977	Solomon's Sons	Circle	1977	Duo with James Newton
1977	Penthouse Jazz	Circle	1977	Quintet: Butch Morris, Don Pullen, Fred Hopkins, Stanley Crouch
1977	Holy Siege on Intrigue	Circle	1977	Quintet: Butch Morris, Don Pullen, Fred Hopkins, Stanley Crouch
1977	Live at the Lower Manhattan Ocean Club	India Navigation	1978	Quartet: Lester Bowie, Fred Hopkins, Phillip Wilson
1978	Let the Music Take You	Marge	1978	Quartet: Butch Morris, Johnny Dyani, George Brown
1978	Last of the Hipman	Red	1978	Quartet: Butch Morris, Johnny Dyani, George Brown
1978	Conceptual Saxophone	Cadillac	1978	Solo saxophone
1978	Sur-real Saxophone	Horo	1978	Solo saxophone
1978	Organic Saxophone	Palm	1978	Solo saxophone
1978	Interboogieology	Black Saint	1978	Quartet: Butch Morris, Johnny Dyani, Oliver Johnson with Marta Contreras
1978	The London Concert	Cadillac	1978	Quintet: Butch Morris, Curtis Clark, Brian Smith, Clifford Jarvis
1978	3D Family	Hat Hut	1978	Trio: Johnny Mbizo Dyani, Andrew Cyrille
1979	Sweet Lovely	Black Saint	1980	Trio: Fred Hopkins, Steve McCall
1980	Solo Live	Cecma	1980	Solo saxophone and bass clarinet
1980	Ming	Black Saint	1980	Octet: Henry Threadgill, Olu Dara, Butch Morris, George E. Lewis, Anthony Davis, Wilber Morris, Steve McCall
1981	Home	Black Saint	1982	Octet: Henry Threadgill, Olu Dara, Butch Morris, George Lewis, Anthony Davis, Wilber Morris, Steve McCall
1982	Murray's Steps	Black Saint	1982	Octet: Henry Threadgill, Bobby Bradford, Butch Morris, Craig Harris, Curtis Clark, Wilber Morris, Steve McCall
1983	Morning Song	Black Saint	1983	Quartet: John Hicks, Reggie Workman, Ed Blackwell
1984	Live at Sweet Basil Volume 1	Black Saint	1984	Big band: Olu Dara, Baikida Carroll, Craig Harris, Bob Stewart, Vincent Chancey, Steve Coleman, John Purcell, Rod Williams, Fred Hopkins, Billy Higgins conducted by Butch Morris
1984	Live at Sweet Basil Volume 2	Black Saint	1984	Big band: Olu Dara, Baikida Carroll, Craig Harris, Bob Stewart, Vincent Chancey, Steve Coleman, John Purcell, Rod Williams, Fred Hopkins, Billy Higgins conducted by Butch Morris
1984	Children	Black Saint	1984	Quintet: James Blood Ulmer, Don Pullen, Lonnie Plaxico, Marvin Smith
1985	Sketches of Tokyo	DIW	1985	Duo with John Hicks
1985	New Life	Black Saint	1985	Octet: Baikida Carroll, Hugh Ragin, Craig Harris, John Purcell, Adegoke Steve Colson, Wilber Morris, Ralph Peterson, Jr.
1986	I Want to Talk About You	Black Saint	1989	Quartet: John Hicks, Ray Drummond, Ralph Peterson, Jr.
1986	Recording N.Y.C. 1986	DIW	1986	Quartet: James Blood Ulmer, Fred Hopkins, Sunny Murray
1986	In Our Style	DIW	1986	Duo with Jack DeJohnette
1986	The Hill	Black Saint	1987	Trio: Richard Davis, Joe Chambers
1987	Hope Scope	Black Saint	1991	Octet: Rasul Siddik, Hugh Ragin, Craig Harris, James Spaulding, Dave Burrell, Wilber Morris, Ralph Peterson, Jr
1987	The Healers	Black Saint	1987	Duo with Randy Weston
1987	The People's Choice	Cecma	1987	Quartet: Hugh Ragin, Abdul Wadud, Fred Hopkins
1988	Lovers	DIW	1988	Quartet: Dave Burrell, Fred Hopkins, Ralph Peterson, Jr.
1988	Deep River	DIW	1988	Quartet: Dave Burrell, Fred Hopkins, Ralph Peterson, Jr.
1988	Ballads	DIW	1988	Quartet: Dave Burrell, Fred Hopkins, Ralph Peterson, Jr.
1988	Spirituals	DIW	1988	Quartet: Dave Burrell, Fred Hopkins, Ralph Peterson, Jr.
1988	Tenors	DIW	1988	Quartet: Dave Burrell, Fred Hopkins, Ralph Peterson, Jr.
1988	Ming's Samba	Portrait	1988	Quartet: John Hicks, Ray Drummond, Ed Blackwell
1988	Lucky Four	Tutu	1989	Quartet: Dave Burrell, Wilbur Morris, Victor Lewis
1989	Daybreak	Gazell	1989	Duo with Dave Burrell
1989	Last of the Hipmen	Jazzline	1989	Sextet: Dave Burrell, Hugh Ragin, Wilber Morris, Bobby Battle, Paul Zauner
1990	Special Quartet	DIW/Columbia	1991	Quartet: McCoy Tyner, Fred Hopkins, Elvin Jones
1990	Remembrances	DIW	1991	Quintet: Hugh Ragin, Dave Burrell, Wilber Morris, Tani Tabbal
1991	Shakill's Warrior	DIW/Columbia	1991	Quartet: Stanley Franks, Don Pullen, Andrew Cyrille
1991	David Murray Big Band	DIW/Columbia	1991	Big band: Hugh Ragin, Graham Haynes, Rasul Siddik, James Zollar, Craig Harris, Frank Lacy, Al Patterson, Bob Stewart, Vincent Chancey, Khalil Henry, James Spaulding, Patience Higgins, Don Byron, John Purcell, Sonelius Smith, Fred Hopkins, Tani Tabbal conducted by Butch Morris
1991	The Jazzpar Prize	Enja	1992	Orchestra (New Jungle Orchestra): Pierre Dørge, Horace Parlan, Harry Beckett, Per Jörgensen, Jörg Huke, Jesper Zeuthen, Jacob Mygind, Irene Becker, Jens Skou Olsen, Audun Kleive
1991	Blue Monk	Enja	1991	Duo with Aki Takase
1991	David Murray/James Newton Quintet	DIW	1996	Quintet: James Newton, John Hicks, Fred Hopkins, Andrew Cyrille, Billy Hart
1991	Black & Black	Red Baron	1991	Quartet: Marcus Belgrave, Kirk Lightsey, Santi Debriano, Roy Haynes
1991	In Concert	Victo	1991	Duo with Dave Burrell
1991	Fast Life	DIW/Columbia	1991	Quartet + 1: John Hicks, Ray Drummond, Idris Muhammad, Branford Marsalis
1991	Ballads for Bass Clarinet	DIW	1993	Quartet: John Hicks, Ray Drummond, Idris Muhammad
1991	Death of a Sideman	DIW	1992	Quintet: Bobby Bradford, Dave Burrell, Fred Hopkins, Ed Blackwell, all music composed by Bobby Bradford
1991	Real Deal	DIW	1994	Duo with Milford Graves
1991	A Sanctuary Within	Black Saint	1992	Quartet: Tony Overwater, Sunny Murray, Kahil El'Zabar
1992	South of the Border	DIW	1993	Big band: Hugh Ragin, Rasul Siddik, James Zollar, Craig Harris, Frank Lacy, Al Patterson, Vincent Chancey, Kahlil Henry, John Purcell, Patience Higgins, Don Byron, Sonelius Smith, Fred Hopkins, Tani Tabbal, Larry McDonald conducted by Butch Morris
1992	Picasso	DIW	1993	Octet: Rasul Siddik, Hugh Ragin, Craig Harris, James Spaulding, Dave Burrell, Wilber Morris, Tani Tabbal
1992	MX	Red Baron	1993	Sextet ("and Friends"): Ravi Coltrane, Bobby Bradford, John Hicks, Fred Hopkins, Victor Lewis
1993	Body and Soul	Black Saint	1993	Quartet: Sonelius Smith, Wilber Morris, Rashied Ali, Taana Running
1993	Brother to Brother	Gazell	1993	Duo with Dave Burrell
1993	Ugly Beauty	Evidence	1995	Duo with Donal Fox
1993	Acoustic Octfunk	Sound Hills	1994	Trio: Fred Hopkins, Andrew Cyrille
1993	Jazzosaurus Rex	Red Baron	1993	Quartet: John Hicks, Ray Drummond, Andrew Cyrille
1993	Saxmen	Red Baron	1993	Quartet: John Hicks, Ray Drummond, Andrew Cyrille
1993	For Aunt Louise	DIW	1995	Quartet: John Hicks, Fred Hopkins, Idris Mohammad
1993	Love and Sorrow	DIW	1996	Quartet: John Hicks, Fred Hopkins, Idris Mohammad
1993	Shakill's II	DIW	1994	Quartet: Bill White, Don Pullen, J.T. Lewis
1993	Windward Passages	Black Saint	1997	Duo with Dave Burrell
1994	David Murray Quintet	DIW	1996	Quintet: Ray Anderson, Anthony Davis, Kenny Davis, Tommy Campbell
1994	The Tip	DIW	1995	Octet: Olu Dara, Robert Irving III, Bobby Broom, Daryl Thompson, Darryl Jones, Toby Williams, Kahil El'Zabar
1994	Jug-A-Lug	DIW	1995	Octet: Olu Dara, Robert Irving III, Bobby Broom, Daryl Thompson, Darryl Jones, Toby Williams, Kahil El'Zabar
1995	Flowers Around Cleveland	Bleu Regard	1995	Quartet: Bobby Few, John Betsch, Jean Jacques Avenel
1995	Live at the Village Vanguard	Sound Hills	2000	Quartet: Hilton Ruiz, Kelly Roberty, Pheeroan akLaff
1996	Dark Star: The Music of the Grateful Dead	Astor Place	1996	Octet: Hugh Ragin, James Zoller, Omar Kabir, Craig Harris, James Spaulding, Robert Irving III, Fred Hopkins, Renzell Meritt, Bob Weir
1996	Long Goodbye: A Tribute to Don Pullen	DIW	1998	Quartet: D.D. Jackson, Santi Debriano, J.T. Lewis
1996	Fo Deuk Revue	Justin Time	1997	Big band: Darryl Burgee, Ousseynou Diop, Assane Diop, Craig Harris, Robert Irving III, Abdou Karim Mané, Oumar Mboup, Hugh Ragin, Doudou N'Diaye Rose, Moussa Séné, El Hadji Gniancou Sembène, Jamaaladeen Tacuma and vocalists
1997	Valencia	Sound Hills	2022	Duo with Aki Takase
1997	Creole	Justin Time	1998	Tentet: Michel Cilla, Max Cilla, Ray Drummond, Billy Jabali Hart, D.D. Jackson, Klod Kiavue, François Landreseau, Gérard Lockel, James Newton
1997	Speaking in Tongues	Justin Time	1999	Octet: Fontella Bass, Hugh Ragin, Stanley Franks, Clarence 'Pookie' Jenkins, Ranzell Merritt, Jimane Nelson, Leopoldo F. Fleming
1998	Seasons	Pow Wow	1999	Quartet: Roland Hanna, Richard Davis, Victor Lewis
1999	Octet Plays Trane	Justin Time	2000	Octet: Rasul Siddick, Hugh Ragin, Craig Harris, James Spaulding, Ravi Best, D. D. Jackson, Mark Johnson, Jaribu Shahid
2000	Like a Kiss that Never Ends	Justin Time	2001	Quartet (Power Quartet): John Hicks, Ray Drummond, Andrew Cyrille
2001	Yonn-Dé	Justin Time	2002	Octet feat. the Gwo ka Masters: Hugh Ragin, Craig Harris, Santi Debriano, Pheeroan akLaff, Klod Kiavue, François Landreseau, Guy Konket
2001	Silence	Justin Time	2008	Duo with Mal Waldron
2001-02	Now Is Another Time	Justin Time	2003	Big band (Latin) featuring Hamiet Bluiett, Hugh Ragin, Craig Harris
2002	Waltz Again	Justin Time	2005	Quartet: Lafayette Gilchrist, Jaribu Shahid, Hamid Drake and string section
2003	Gwotet	Justin Time	2004	Orchestra feat. Pharoah Sanders and the Gwo ka Masters: Carlos Sonduy Dimet, Alexander Brown, Elpidio Chappotin Delgado, Leonardo Alarcon, Angel Ballester Veliz, Moises Marquez Leyva, Klod Kiavue, Christian Laviso, Hervé Sambe, Jaribu Shahid, Hamid Drake
2006	Sacred Ground	Justin Time	2007	Quartet: Lafayette Gilchrist, Ray Drummond, Andrew Cyrille and Cassandra Wilson
2007	Live in Berlin	Jazzwerkstatt	2008	Quartet (Black Saint Quartet): Lafayette Gilchrist, Jaribu Shahid, Hamid Drake
2008	The Devil Tried to Kill Me	Justin Time	2009	Orchestra feat. the Gwo-Ka Masters and Taj Mahal
2009	Rendezvous Suite	Jazzwerkstatt	2011	Quartet: Jamaaladeen Tacuma, Mingus Murray, Ranzell Merrit
2010	Plays Nat King Cole en Español	Motéma	2011	Tentet: Cuban ensemble with Daniel Melingo and strings
2012	Be My Monster Love	Motéma	2013	Quartet (Infinity Quartet): Marc Cary, Jaribu Shahid, Nasheet Waits plus Macy Gray, Gregory Porter, Bobby Bradford
2015	Blues for Memo	Doublemoon	2016	Quartet (Infinity Quartet)
2015	Perfection	Motéma	2016	Trio: Geri Allen and Terri Lyne Carrington
2022	Sun/Moon	J.M.I.	2022	Solo tenor saxophone and bass clarinet
2023	Plumb	J.M.I.	2023	Trio: Questlove and Ray Angry

== As a member ==
Clarinet Summit

- In Concert at the Public Theatre (India Navigation, 1984)
- Southern Bells (Black Saint, 1987)

World Saxophone Quartet

See main article: World Saxophone Quartet

== As sideman ==
With James Blood Ulmer

- Are You Glad to Be in America? (Rough Trade/Artists House, 1980)
- Music Revelation Ensemble – No Wave (Moers Music, 1980)
- Free Lancing (Columbia, 1981)
- Music Revelation Ensemble (DIW, 1988)
- Music Revelation Ensemble – Elec. Jazz (DIW, 1990)
- Music Revelation Ensemble – After Dark (DIW, 1991)

With Jack DeJohnette

- Special Edition (ECM, 1980)
- Album Album (ECM, 1984)

With Kahil El'Zabar

- One World Family (CIMP, 2000)
- Love Outside of Dreams (Delmark, 2002)
- We Is (Delmark, 2004)

With Kip Hanrahan

- Conjure – Music for the Texts of Ishmael Reed (American Clavé, 1984)
- Vertical's Currency (American Clavé, 1985)
- Conjure – Cab Calloway Stands in for the Moon (American Clavé, 1988)
- Days and Nights of Blue Luck Inverted (American Clavé, 1988)

With D.D. Jackson

- Peace Song (Justin Time, 1994)
- Paired Down (Jusin Time, 1996)

With McCoy Tyner

- Blues for Coltrane: A Tribute to John Coltrane (Impulse!, 1987)
- 44th Street Suite (Red Baron, 1991)

With others

- Ted Daniel, In the Beginning (Altura Music, 1975)
- Michael Gregory Jackson, Clarity (Bija, 1976)
- Sunny Murray, Live at Moers Festival (Moers Music, 1979) – live
- Amiri Baraka, New Music New Poetry (India Navigation, 1980)
- Billy Bang, Outline No. 12 (Celluloid, 1982 [1983])
- Craig Harris, Cold Sweat Plays J. B. (JMT, 1989) – featuring Murray on 2 tracks
- Ralph Peterson, Presents the Fo'tet (Blue Note, 1989)
- Bobby Battle Quartet with David Murray, The Offering (Mapleshade, 1990)
- The Bob Thiele Collective, Sunrise Sunset (Red Baron, 1990)
- Teresa Brewer, Softly I Sing (Red Baron, 1991)
- Andrew Cyrille Quintet, Ode to the Living Tree (Venus, 1995) – recorded in 1994
- Steve Coleman and Five Elements, Curves of Life (Live at the Hot Brass) (Novus/BMG, 1995) – live, featuring Murray on 2 tracks
- Jim Nolet, With You (KFW, 1995)
- Kansas City Soundtrack (Verve, 1995)
- Ozay, Antiquated Love (Sagen, 1995)
- Jon Jang Sextet, Two Flowers on a Stem (Soul Note, 1996)
- The Roots, Illadelph Halflife (DGC, Geffen, 1996)
- Hugh Ragin, An Afternoon in Harlem (Justin Time, 1999)
- Balogh Kálmán, David Murray, Gipsy Cimbalom Band, Balogh Kálmán Featuring Kovács Ferenc (Fonó, 2004)
- James Carter, Live at Baker's Keyboard Lounge (Warner Bros., 2004) – live recorded in 2001
- Henry Grimes, Live at the Kerava Jazz Festival with Hamid Drake (Ayler, 2005) – live recorded in 2004
