= Live at Sweet Basil Volume 1 =

Live album by David Murray Big Band
- Released: 1984
- Recorded: August 24–26, 1984
- Genre: Jazz
- Length: 42:30
- Label: Black Saint
- Producer: David Murray

David Murray Big Band chronology
Morning Song (1983)	Live at Sweet Basil Volume 1 (1984)	Live at Sweet Basil Volume 2 (1984)

Live at Sweet Basil Volume 1 is an album by David Murray, released on the Italian Black Saint label in 1984 and the first to feature his Big Band. It features performances by Murray, Olu Dara, Baikida Carroll, Craig Harris, Bob Stewart, Vincent Chancey, Steve Coleman, John Purcell, Rod Williams, Fred Hopkins and Billy Higgins conducted by Lawrence "Butch" Morris. The album was followed by Live at Sweet Basil Volume 2.

== Reception ==
The AllMusic review by Scott Yanow stated, "The David Murray Big Band tends to be a bit undisciplined, with plenty of rambunctious and overcrowded ensembles... The Dixieland-esque structures are better understood by some of the musicians than others, and this performance is quite erratic but certainly memorable".

Professional ratings
Review scores
Source	Rating
AllMusic	3/5 stars
The Penguin Guide to Jazz Recordings	3/4 stars

== Track listing ==
All compositions by David Murray

1. "Lovers" – 8:20
2. "Bechet's Bounce" – 12:05
3. "Silence" – 5:55
4. "Duet for Big Band" – 16:10

- Recorded live in concert at Sweet Basil, NYC, August 24–26, 1984

== Personnel ==
- David Murray: tenor saxophone, bass clarinet
- Olu Dara: cornet
- Baikida Carroll: trumpet
- Craig Harris: trombone
- Bob Stewart: tuba
- Vincent Chancey: flugelhorn
- Steve Coleman: soprano saxophone, alto saxophone
- John Purcell: alto saxophone, clarinet
- Rod Williams: piano
- Fred Hopkins: bass
- Billy Higgins: percussion
- Lawrence "Butch" Morris: conductor
