= Special Quartet =

Studio album by David Murray
- Released: 1991
- Recorded: March 26, 1990
- Genre: Jazz
- Length: 52:20
- Label: DIW/Columbia
- Producer: Bob Thiele

David Murray chronology
Lucky Four (1989)	Special Quartet (1991)	Remembrances (1990)

Special Quartet is an album by the American saxophonist David Murray. It was released on the DIW/Columbia label. It features six quartet performances by Murray with Fred Hopkins, McCoy Tyner, and Elvin Jones. The album was produced by Bob Thiele.

== Critical reception ==
Professional ratings
Review scores
Source	Rating
AllMusic	5/5 stars
The Penguin Guide to Jazz Recordings	4/4 stars

The Edmonton Journal wrote that "the session ... is not a rehash of Coltrane... Each number works as a blowing vehicle for Murray with a blast furnace at his back."

The AllMusic review by Scott Yanow stated: "A successful outing full of mutual inspiration, this CD is easily recommended."

== Track listing ==
1. "Cousin Mary" (Coltrane) – 7:30
2. "Hope/Scope" – 10:48
3. "La Tina Lee" (Morris) – 6:02
4. "Dexter's Dues" – 6:33
5. "In a Sentimental Mood" (Ellington, Kurtz, Mills) – 10:21
6. "3D Family" – 9:28

All compositions by David Murray except as indicated
Recorded March 26, 1990, at Soundtrack, NYC

== Personnel ==
- David Murray – tenor saxophone
- McCoy Tyner – piano
- Fred Hopkins – bass
- Elvin Jones – drums
