= Ballads (David Murray album) =

Studio album by David Murray
- Released: 1988
- Recorded: January 1988
- Genre: Jazz
- Length: 46:31
- Label: DIW
- Producer: Kazunori Sugiyama

David Murray chronology
New Life (1986)	Ballads (1988)	Deep River (1988)

Ballads is a jazz album by David Murray released on the Japanese DIW label in 1988. It features six quartet performances by Murray with Fred Hopkins, Dave Burrell and Ralph Peterson Jr.

== Reception ==
The Allmusic review by Stephen Cook awarded the album 3 stars stating "Ballads is an excellent set on all levels and even the sound is superb. One of the best albums of the '80s. ".

Professional ratings
Review scores
Source	Rating
Allmusic	3/5 stars
The Penguin Guide to Jazz Recordings	4/4 stars
Tom Hull	A

== Track listing ==
1. "Valley Talk" (Burrell) – 7:14
2. "Love in Resort" – 4:44
3. "Ballad for the Black Man" – 11:02
4. "Paradise Five" – 8:19
5. "Lady in Black" (Peterson) – 8:00
6. "Sarah's Lament" (Burrell) – 7:12

All compositions by David Murray except as indicated

== Personnel ==
- David Murray – tenor saxophone
- Dave Burrell – piano
- Fred Hopkins – bass
- Ralph Peterson, Jr. – drums
