= Roots (Cedar Walton album) =

Studio album by Cedar Walton
- Released: 1997
- Recorded: January 3 & 4, 1997
- Studio: Van Gelder Studio, Englewood Cliffs, NJ.
- Genre: Jazz
- Length: 59:10
- Label: Astor Place; TCD-4010
- Producer: Don Sickler & Cedar Walton

Cedar Walton chronology
Composer (1996)	Roots (1997)	The Promise Land (2001)

Roots is an album by pianist Cedar Walton which was recorded in 1997 and released on the Astor Place label.

== Reception ==
Allmusic reviewed the album stating "this is a solid, modern hard bop date that reaches its potential". All About Jazz observed "Cedar Walton is a treasure with an uncanny sense for composition, arrangement, and performance. His most recent recording Roots readily bears this out. His music is layered, as is his band... This is sophisticated and readily consumable mainstream jazz that is well recommended". JazzTimes said "Cedar Walton is an heir to those class acts that have made the piano so often the repository of the orchestral voice of jazz... Here he gets a chance to give voice to his muse through a larger ensemble... the compositions sound fresh-benefitting from these new arrangements and from the range of solo styles that play over them".

Professional ratings
Review scores
Source	Rating
Allmusic	4/5 stars
The Penguin Guide to Jazz Recordings	4/4 stars

== Track listing ==
All compositions by Cedar Walton

1. "Bolivia" - 6:28
2. "Ojos de Rojo" - 7:57
3. "When Love Is New" - 8:05
4. "I'll Let You Know" - 6:24
5. "Mode for Joe" - 6:28
6. "Blue Monterey" - 5:22
7. "Fantasy in D" - 4:52
8. "Fiesta Español" - 6:37
9. "Firm Roots" - 6:57

== Personnel ==
- Cedar Walton - piano
- Terence Blanchard - trumpet
- Don Sickler - trumpet, flugelhorn
- Scott Whitfield - trombone
- Willie Williams - soprano saxophone, tenor saxophone
- Bobby Porcelli - alto saxophone
- Joshua Redman - tenor saxophone
- Gary Smulyan - baritone saxophone
- Mark Whitfield - guitar
- Ron Carter - bass
- Lewis Nash - drums
- Ray Mantilla - percussion

=== Production ===
- Don Sickler - producer
- Rudy Van Gelder - engineer
