= Ming's Samba =

Studio album by David Murray
- Released: 1988
- Recorded: July 20, 1988
- Genre: Jazz
- Length: 33:25
- Label: Portrait
- Producer: Bob Thiele

David Murray chronology
Spirituals (1988)	Ming's Samba (1988)	Lovers (1988)

Ming's Samba is an album by David Murray released on the Portrait label in 1988. It features five quartet performances by Murray with John Hicks, Ray Drummond and Ed Blackwell.

== Reception ==
The Allmusic review by Scott Yanow awarded the album 4 stars stating "Although David Murray had already recorded a countless number of sessions as a leader by the late 1980s, Ming's Samba was his first on a large American label... A recommended release although this set will probably be difficult to find.".

Professional ratings
Review scores
Source	Rating
Allmusic	4/5 stars

== Track listing ==
All compositions by David Murray except as indicated

1. "Ming's Samba" – 10:54
2. "Rememberin' Fats (for Fats Waller)" – 8:44
3. "Nowhere Everafter" (Butch Morris) – 2:52
4. "Spooning" (Morris) – 7:31
5. "Walter's Waltz" – 9:24

== Personnel ==
- David Murray – tenor saxophone, bass clarinet
- John Hicks – piano
- Ray Drummond – bass
- Ed Blackwell – drums
