= Composer (album) =

Studio album by Cedar Walton
- Released: June 25, 1996
- Recorded: January 9–10, 1996
- Studio: Clinton Recording Studios, NYC
- Genre: Jazz
- Length: 61:08
- Label: Astor Place; TCD-4001
- Producer: Don Sickler

Cedar Walton chronology
Manhattan Afternoon (1992)	Composer (1996)	Roots (1997)

Composer is an album by pianist Cedar Walton which was recorded in 1996 and released on the Astor Place label.

== Reception ==
Professional ratings
Review scores
Source	Rating
AllMusic	4.5/5 stars
The Penguin Guide to Jazz Recordings	4/4 stars

Scott Yanow of AllMusic reviewed the album stating, "Walton is not normally thought of as a major composer. However, quite a few of his new pieces could possibly become standards in the future if jazz improvisers explore this disc... Highly recommended".

== Track listing ==
All compositions by Cedar Walton

1. "Martha's Prize" - 6:15
2. "The Vision" - 7:25
3. "Happiness" - 5:51
4. "Minor Controversy" - 7:14
5. "Hindsight" - 8:21
6. "Underground Memoirs" - 7:41
7. "Theme for Jobim" - 6:17
8. "Groove Passage" - 6:12
9. "Ground Work" - 5:52

== Personnel ==
- Cedar Walton - piano
- Roy Hargrove - trumpet
- Ralph Moore - soprano saxophone, tenor saxophone
- Vincent Herring - alto saxophone
- Christian McBride - bass
- Victor Lewis - drums

=== Production ===
- Don Sickler - producer
- Jim Anderson - engineer
