= Deep River (David Murray album) =

Studio album by David Murray
- Released: 1988
- Recorded: January 1988
- Genre: Jazz
- Length: 63:18
- Label: DIW
- Producer: Kazunori Sugiyama

David Murray chronology
Ballads (1988)	Deep River (1988)	Spirituals (1988)

Deep River is an album by David Murray released on the Japanese DIW label in 1988. It features seven quartet performances by Murray with Fred Hopkins, Dave Burrell and Ralph Peterson Jr.

== Reception ==
The Allmusic review by Brian Olewnick awarded the album 3 stars, stating: "Essential? Perhaps not, but of a piece with his generally strong work from the late '80s and a perfectly enjoyable listen."

Tom Hull wrote that "Murray was already famously prolific, but never more so than during the January 1988 quartet sessions he recorded in New York for Japan's DIW label...The first released has a bit of each and two Africa-themed originals that head elsewhere. They're so consistent they should be wrapped up into a magnificent box set. With Dave Burrell, who repays every second of solo time, Fred Hopkins, and Ralph Peterson Jr."

Professional ratings
Review scores
Source	Rating
Allmusic	3/5 stars
The Penguin Guide to Jazz Recordings	3.5/4 stars
Tom Hull	A

== Track listing ==
1. "Jazz (Is Back)" (Morris) - 7:11
2. "Home" - 10:03
3. "M'Bizo" - 10:52
4. "Theme 2A" - 11:14
5. "Dakar Dance" - 5:30
6. "Mr. P.C." (Coltrane) - 12:44
7. "Deep River" (Traditional) - 5:54

All compositions by David Murray except as indicated

== Personnel ==
- David Murray - tenor saxophone
- Dave Burrell - piano
- Fred Hopkins - bass
- Ralph Peterson Jr. - drums
