= Flowers Around Cleveland =

Live album by David Murray
- Released: 1995
- Recorded: May 16–17, 1995
- Genre: Jazz
- Length: 68:34
- Label: Bleu Regard

David Murray chronology
David Murray Quintet (1994)	Flowers Around Cleveland (1995)	Dark Star: The Music of the Grateful Dead (1996)

Flowers Around Cleveland is an album by David Murray released on the French Bleu Regard label. It was released in 1995 and features seven quartet performances by Murray with pianist Bobby Few, bassist Jean Jacques Avenel and drummer John Betsch.

== Reception ==
The Allmusic review by Thom Jurek awarded the album 4 stars stating "This is one of Murray's records to seek out.".

Professional ratings
Review scores
Source	Rating
Allmusic	4/5 stars

== Track listing ==
1. "Fantasy Rainbow" – 8:33
2. "Few's Blues" (Few) – 8:06
3. "The Desagregation of Our Children" – 10:36
4. "Sorrow Song (For W.E.B. Dubois)" – 10:52
5. "Dakar Darkness" – 6:35
6. "When the Monarchs Come to Town" – 9:09
7. "Flowers Around Cleveland" (Avenel, Betsch, Few, Murray) – 8:43

All compositions by David Murray except as indicated
Recorded May 16 & 17, 1995

== Personnel ==
- David Murray – tenor saxophone
- Bobby Few – piano
- John Betsch – drums
- Jean Jacques Avenel – bass
