= The Hill (David Murray album) =

Studio album by David Murray Trio
- Released: 1987
- Recorded: November 29, 1986
- Genre: Jazz
- Length: 48:39
- Label: Black Saint

David Murray Trio chronology
I Want to Talk About You (1986)	The Hill (1987)	The Healers (1987)

The Hill is an album by David Murray, released on the Italian Black Saint label in 1987. It features performances by Murray, Richard Davis and Joe Chambers.

== Reception ==
The Penguin Guide to Jazz hailed the album as "one of the peaks of Murray's career... Murray has significantly toned down his delivery from the immediately previous sessions and sounds altogether more thoughtful...This is an essential modern album."

Gary Giddins also called The Hill "one of [Murray's] best recordings...a consistently provocative trio session with superb work by bassist Richard Davis and drummer Joe Chambers. Nowhere is Murray's disarming authority more forceful than on 'Fling', a Butch Morris infrastructure of melody and rhythm that's coolly lyrical on the surface and tricky at the core. It's an enigmatic double-tiered piece in seven/four, with an ascending seven-measure episode of chromatic whole notes in the middle... Murray sails through the unusual meter and phrase lengths as though they were no more difficult than a waltz."

The AllMusic review by Brian Olewnick stated that "The Hill offers an accurate snapshot of Murray in the mid-'80s, straddling the mainstream and avant-garde and proving himself quite adept in either."

Professional ratings
Review scores
Source	Rating
AllMusic	3/5 stars
The Penguin Guide to Jazz Recordings	4/4 stars

== Track listing ==
1. "Santa Barbara and Crenshaw Follies" - 8:25
2. "The Hill" - 9:00
3. "Fling" (Butch Morris) - 7:09
4. "Take the Coltrane" (Duke Ellington) - 7:42
5. "Herbie Miller" - 5:52
6. "Chelsea Bridge" (Billy Strayhorn) - 10:31

All compositions by David Murray except as indicated
- Recorded at Sound Ideas Studios, NYC, November 29, 1986

== Personnel ==
- David Murray - tenor saxophone, bass clarinet
- Richard Davis - bass
- Joe Chambers - drums, vibes
