= Live at the Lower Manhattan Ocean Club =

Live album by David Murray
- Released: 1978
- Recorded: December 31, 1977
- Genre: Jazz
- Length: 75:03
- Label: India Navigation
- Producer: Bob Cummins

David Murray chronology
Flowers for Albert (1976)	Live at the Lower Manhattan Ocean Club (1978)	Let the Music Take You (1978)

Live at the Lower Manhattan Ocean Club is a live album by David Murray. It was released as two volumes on the India Navigation label in 1978 and re-released in 1989 on a single CD (with a slightly edited final track). It features a live performance by Murray, trumpeter Lester Bowie, bassist Fred Hopkins and drummer Phillip Wilson recorded in concert at the Lower Manhattan Ocean Club, NYC.

== Reception ==
The Rolling Stone Jazz Record Guide called the first volume of Live at the Lower Manhattan Ocean Club "an epoch-stretching quartet set". The AllMusic review by Scott Yanow stated, "This double CD, which packages together the two original LPs, captures David Murray's quartet (trumpeter Lester Bowie, bassist Fred Hopkins and drummer Phillip Wilson) in high spirits. The six selections (four are over ten minutes and 'For Walter Norris' exceeds 21) are full of spirit, looseness, humor, screams and screeches. Some of it rambles on too long (and Murray's soprano on 'Bechet's Bounce' is quite silly) but it generally holds on to one's attention."

Professional ratings
Review scores
Source	Rating
AllMusic	3/5 stars
The Rolling Stone Jazz Record Guide	(Vol. 1)
The Rolling Stone Jazz Record Guide	(Vol. 2)
The Village Voice	A−

== Track listing ==
1. "Nevada's Theme" - 11:15
2. "Bechet's Bounce" - 7:37
3. "Obe" (Morris) - 18:12
4. "Let the Music Take You" - 3:36
5. "For Walter Norris" (Morris) - 21:16
6. "Santa Barbara and Crenshaw Follies" - 12:20

All compositions by David Murray except as indicated
- Recorded in concert at the Lower Manhattan Ocean Club, NYC, December 31, 1977

== Personnel ==
- David Murray - tenor saxophone, bass clarinet on 2
- Lester Bowie - trumpet
- Fred Hopkins - bass
- Phillip Wilson - drums
