= Gwotet =

Studio album by David Murray
- Released: Jun 8, 2004
- Recorded: October 2003
- Genre: Jazz
- Length: 62:31
- Label: Justin Time
- Producer: David Murray

David Murray chronology
Now Is Another Time (2003)	Gwotet (2004)	Waltz Again (2005)

Gwotet is an album by David Murray released on the Justin Time label. Recorded in 2003 and released in 2004 the album features performances by Murray and the Gwo-Ka Masters with Pharoah Sanders. It is Murray's second album with the Gwo-Ka Masters following Yonn-Dé (2002).

== Reception ==
Professional ratings
Review scores
Source	Rating
AllMusic	4/5 stars
The Penguin Guide to Jazz Recordings	3/4 stars
The Village Voice	A

Reviewing for The Village Voice in September 2004, Tom Hull called Gwotet as "a foray into pan-African cosmopolitanism" and "a nonstop riot of rhythm and horns".

The AllMusic review by Scott Yanow stated, "Freed from playing jazz standards or very free improvisations, Murray really thrives in this exotic setting . . . 'Gwotet', 'Ouagadougou', and 'Djolla Feeling' are high points, but there are no slow moments during the infectious set of danceable but somewhat unclassifiable music."

== Track listing ==
1. "Gwotet" (Kiavue, Laviso, Murray) - 12:14
2. "O' Léonso" (Traditional) - 7:57
3. "Ouagadougou" - 12:30
4. "La Jwa" - 10:04
5. "Djolla Feeling" (Sambe) - 9:24
6. "Go to Jazz" (Kiavue, Murray) - 4:26
7. "Ovwa" (Kiavue, Traditional) - 5:34
8. "Gwotet [Radio Edit]" (Kiavue, Laviso, Murray) - 6:22

All compositions by David Murray except as indicated
- Recorded October 2003

== Personnel ==
- David Murray - tenor saxophone
- Leonardo Alarcon - trombone
- Angel Ballester Veliz - alto saxophone and flute
- Alexander Brown - trumpet
- Elpidio Chappotin Delgado - trumpet
- Hamid Drake - drums
- Klod Kiavue - gwo ka drums and voice
- Christian Laviso - guitar and voice
- Moises Marquez Leyva - baritone saxophone
- Hervé Sambe - guitar
- Pharoah Sanders - tenor saxophone
- Jaribu Shahid - bass
- Carlos Sonduy Dimet - trumpet
