= Tommy Campbell (musician) =

American drummer

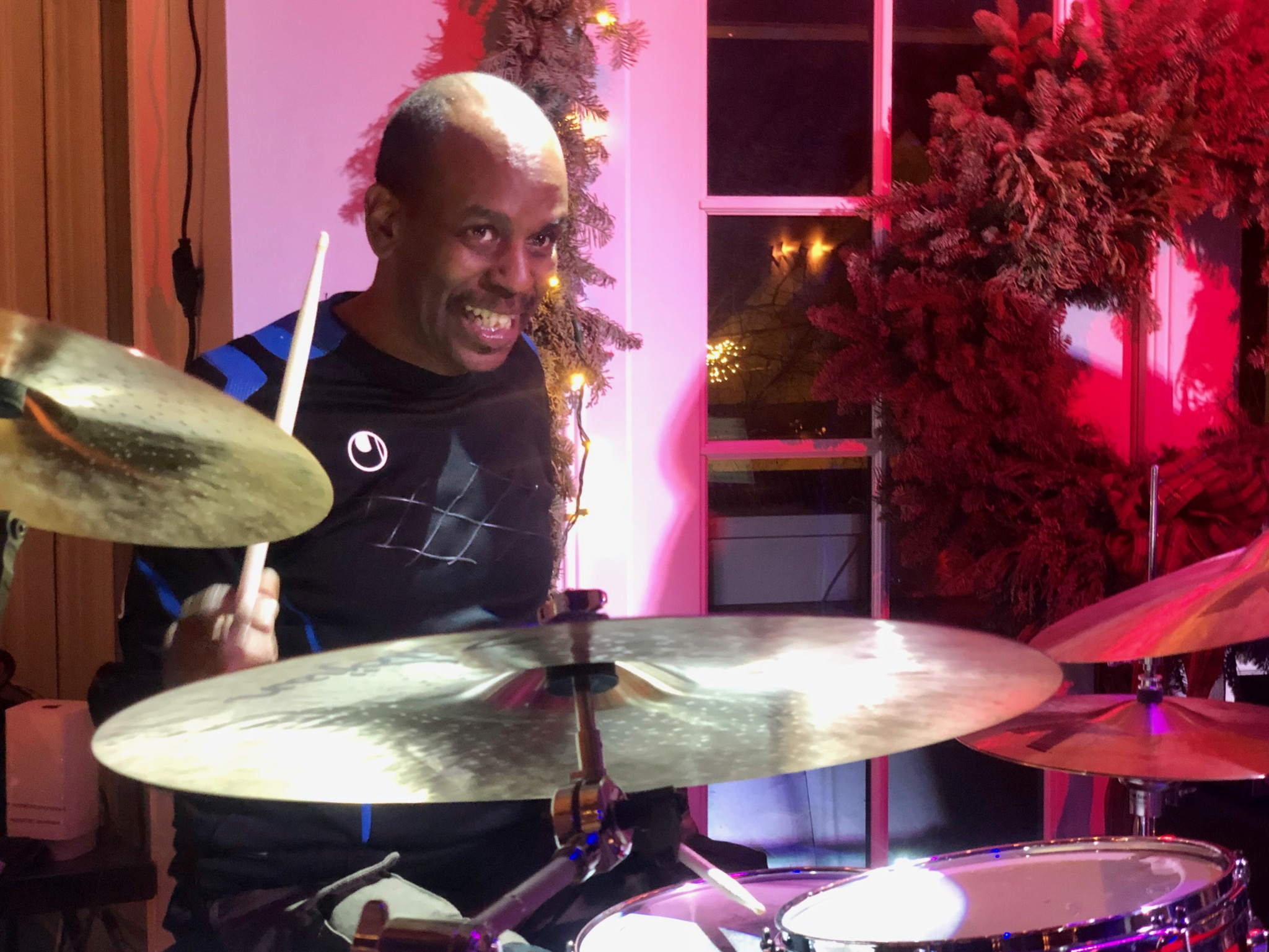
- Campbell at The Green Hill Kitchen in Greenport, NY, December 19, 2018.

Background information
- Born: February 14, 1957 (age 69); Norristown, Pennsylvania, US
- Genres: Jazz
- Instrument: Drums
- Website: tommycampbell.com

Thomas W. Campbell (born February 14, 1957, Norristown, Pennsylvania) is an American jazz drummer.

Campbell's uncle is Jimmy Smith; Campbell played with him as a teenager and subsequently. He was a student at Berklee College of Music from 1975 to 1979, where he played with Tiger Okoshi and Marlena Shaw, and led a band which included Kevin Eubanks. After graduating he became a member of Dizzy Gillespie's big band, where he worked until 1982; he then joined John McLaughlin's group until 1984. He recorded with Eubanks throughout the 1980s and played with Sonny Rollins, Tania Maria, Gary Burton, Igor Butman, and Makoto Ozone in the decade. After relocating to New York City in 1988, he worked with his own group alongside Charnett Moffett, Aydin Esen, and Eubanks. He also worked in a trio setting with David Kikoski and Alex Blake. As a sideman, he worked in the 1990s with Stanley Jordan, the Manhattan Transfer, the Great Saxophone Quartet, David Murray, Ray Anderson, and Mingus Big Band. In early 1998 he moved to Japan and has split his time between the two countries since then.

== Discography ==
=== As leader ===
- My Heart (Jazz City, 1989)

=== As sideman ===
With Ray Anderson

- Don't Mow Your Lawn (Enja, 1994)
- Funkorific (Enja, 1998)
- Being the Point (Intuition, 2015)

With Kevin Eubanks

- Guitarist (Elektra, 1983)
- Sundance (GRP, 1984)
- Opening Night (GRP, 1985)
- Shadow Prophets (GRP, 1988)

With Shanti Snyder

- Sunny and Blue (Savoy, 2011)
- Lotus Flower (Savoy, 2012)
- Born to Sing (Savoy, 2014)

With others

- Gary Burton, Gary Burton and the Berklee Allstars (JVC, 1986)
- Richie Cole, West Side Story (Venus, 1996)
- Santi Debriano, Panamaniacs (Free Lance, 1994)
- Robin Eubanks, Dedication (JMT, 1989)
- Chico Freeman, Sweet Explosion (In+Out, 1990)
- Mac Gollehon, Smokin' Live (McKenzie, 1997)
- Onaje Allan Gumbs, Dare to Dream (Zebra, 1991)
- Clifford Jordan, Play What You Feel (Mapleshade, 1997)
- Attila Laszlo, Once Upon a Time (Budapest Music Center, 2002)
- Loose Ends, So Where Are You? (Virgin, 1985)
- John McLaughlin, Belo Horizonte (Warner Bros., 1981)
- John McLaughlin, Music Spoken Here (Warner Bros., 1982)
- Mingus Big Band, Live in Time (Dreyfus, 1996)
- David Murray, David Murray Quintet (DIW, 1996)
- Makoto Ozone, After (CBS/Sony, 1986)
- Sonny Rollins, Sunny Days, Starry Nights (Milestone 1984)
- Akiko Yano, Simply Blue (Verve, 2005)
