= Interboogieology =

Studio album by David Murray
- Released: 1978
- Recorded: February 1978
- Genre: Jazz
- Length: 38:32
- Label: Black Saint

David Murray chronology
Last of the Hipman (1978)	Interboogieology (1978)	The London Concert (1980)

Interboogieology is an album by the American musician David Murray. It was released on the Italian Black Saint label in 1978. It features performances by Murray, cornetist Butch Morris, bassist Johnny Dyani and drummer Oliver Johnson. Marta Contreras sings on two tracks.

== Reception ==
Professional ratings
Review scores
Source	Rating
AllMusic	3/5 stars
The Penguin Guide to Jazz Recordings	3/4 stars
The Rolling Stone Jazz Record Guide	4/5 stars

The Bay State Banner wrote that "Murray's growth as both a composer and stylist from his first India Navigation works is huge, and though he may suffer from an occasional lapse into overstatement, he now seems a thoroughly rounded improviser, who may soon be the tenor's primary spokesperson."

The AllMusic review by Scott Yanow stated: "For this fairly early recording, avant-garde tenor saxophonist David Murray teams up with cornetist Butch Morris, bassist Johnny Dyani and drummer Oliver Johnson for some fairly free improvisations, with the originals written by either Murray or Morris. Two of the numbers also utilize the adventurous voice of Marta Contreras. The results are stimulating if not essential; a lesser but still interesting effort."

== Track listing ==
All compositions by David Murray except as indicated

1. "Namthini's Shadow" (Butch Morris) - 8:18
2. "Home" - 11:15
3. "Blues for David" (Morris) - 9:45
4. "Interboogieology" - 9:14
- Recorded in February 1978 in Milano (Italy) at Ricordi Studios

== Personnel ==
- David Murray – tenor saxophone
- Butch Morris – cornet
- Johnny Dyani – bass
- Oliver Johnson – drums
- Marta Contreras – vocals
- Carlo Martenet – engineering
