= Live at Sweet Basil Volume 2 =

Live album by David Murray Big Band
- Released: 1984
- Recorded: August 24–26, 1984
- Genre: Jazz
- Length: 49:25
- Label: Black Saint
- Producer: David Murray

David Murray Big Band chronology
| Live at Sweet Basil Volume 1 (1984) | Live at Sweet Basil Volume 2 (1984) | Children (1984) |

Live at Sweet Basil Volume 2 is an album by David Murray, released on the Italian Black Saint label in 1984 and the second to feature his Big Band. It features performances by Murray, Olu Dara, Baikida Carroll, Craig Harris, Bob Stewart, Vincent Chancey, Steve Coleman, John Purcell, Rod Williams, Fred Hopkins and Billy Higgins conducted by Lawrence "Butch" Morris. The album was preceded by Live at Sweet Basil Volume 1.

== Reception ==
The AllMusic review by Scott Yanow stated, "There are some strong moments, plenty of dense ensembles, and a strong group spirit that makes one wish that the group had recorded a little more coherently in the studios during this period".

Professional ratings
Review scores
| Source | Rating |
|---|---|
| AllMusic | 3/5 stars |
| The Penguin Guide to Jazz Recordings | 3/4 stars |

== Track listing ==
All compositions by David Murray

1. "Dewey's Circle" – 13:42
2. "Roses" – 11:04
3. "David Tune" – 12:22
4. "Great Peace" – 9:43
5. "Four Minute Marvin (For Marvin Gaye)" – 2:34

- Recorded live in concert at Sweet Basil, NYC, August 24–26, 1984

== Personnel ==
- David Murray: tenor saxophone, bass clarinet
- Olu Dara: cornet
- Baikida Carroll: trumpet
- Craig Harris: trombone
- Bob Stewart: tuba
- Vincent Chancey: flugelhorn
- Steve Coleman: soprano saxophone, alto saxophone
- John Purcell: alto saxophone, clarinet
- Rod Williams: piano
- Fred Hopkins: bass
- Billy Higgins: percussion
- Lawrence "Butch" Morris: conductor
