= Sacred Ground (David Murray album) =

Studio album by David Murray Black Saint Quartet
- Released: 2007
- Recorded: October 20–21, 2006
- Genre: Jazz
- Length: 65:05
- Label: Justin Time
- Producer: David Murray

David Murray Black Saint Quartet chronology
Waltz Again (2005)	Sacred Ground (2007)	Silence (2008)

Sacred Ground is an album by David Murray, released on the Canadian Justin Time label. Recorded in 2006 and released in 2007 the album features performances by Murray, Lafayette Gilchrist, Ray Drummond, and Andrew Cyrille which were composed for the soundtrack for Marco Williams' film Banished (2007) on American counties in the South and Midwest that expelled blacks between Reconstruction and the Great Depression. The album features Cassandra Wilson on two tracks singing lyrics composed by Ishmael Reed.

== Reception ==
The AllMusic review by Thom Jurek stated, "Sacred Ground is a journey in time, space, and sound, one rooted in all the lineages, and yet it is a further benchmark of Murray's own decidedly marked place within it, even as it points both forward and back -- just like Reed's writing and Wilson's singing."

Professional ratings
Review scores
Source	Rating
AllMusic	4/5 stars
The Penguin Guide to Jazz Recordings	4/4 stars

== Track listing ==
1. "Sacred Ground" (Murray, Reed) - 8:52
2. "Transitions" - 12:04
3. "Pierce City" - 9:05
4. "Banished" - 5:46
5. "Believe in Love" - 10:41
6. "Family Reunion" - 7:17
7. "The Prophet of Doom" (Murray, Reed) - 11:20

All compositions by David Murray except as indicated
- Recorded October 20–21, 2006

== Personnel ==
- David Murray - tenor saxophone, bass clarinet
- Lafayette Gilchrist - piano
- Ray Drummond - bass
- Andrew Cyrille - drums
- Cassandra Wilson - vocals (track 1 & 7)
