= Hope Scope =

Studio album by David Murray Octet
- Released: 1991
- Recorded: May 12, 1987; A & R Recording Studios, New York City
- Genre: Jazz
- Length: 43:28
- Label: Black Saint; 12 0139
- Producer: David Murray

David Murray chronology
The Hill (1986)	Hope Scope (1991)	The Healers (1987)

Hope Scope is an album by David Murray's Octet recorded in 1987 and be released on the Italian Black Saint label in 1991. It features Murray's Octet and includes performances by Murray, Rasul Siddik, Hugh Ragin, Craig Harris, James Spaulding, Dave Burrell, Wilber Morris and Ralph Peterson, Jr.

== Reception ==
The Allmusic review by Scott Yanow awarded the album 4½ stars, stating: "This spirited set has tributes to Ben Webster and Lester Young but is at its best when the full ensemble (trumpeters Hugh Ragin and Rasul Siddik, trombonist Craig Harris, altoist James Spaulding, pianist Dave Burrell, bassist Wilber Morris and drummer Ralph Peterson, Jr., along with the leader on tenor and bass clarinet) get to improvise together. This is one of their strongest all-round recordings with 'Hope Scope' being a particular highpoint."

Professional ratings
Review scores
Source	Rating
Allmusic	4.5/5 stars
The Penguin Guide to Jazz Recordings	3/4 stars

== Track listing ==
All compositions by David Murray except as indicated

1. "Ben" - 7:41
2. "Same Places New Faces" (Craig Harris) - 9:03
3. "Hope Scope" - 8:23
4. "Lester" - 8:27
5. "Thabo" (Ralph Peterson, Jr.) - 9:54

== Personnel ==
- David Murray - tenor saxophone, bass clarinet
- Rasul Siddik - trumpet
- Hugh Ragin - trumpet
- Craig Harris - trombone
- James Spaulding - alto saxophone
- Dave Burrell - piano
- Wilber Morris - bass
- Ralph Peterson, Jr. - drums
