= Seasons (David Murray album) =

Studio album by David Murray
- Released: 1999
- Recorded: August 3, 1998
- Genre: Jazz
- Length: 71:04
- Label: Pow Wow
- Producer: Herbie Miller

David Murray chronology
Creole (1998)	Seasons (1999)	Speaking in Tongues (1999)

Seasons is an album by David Murray, released on the Pow Wow label. It was released in 1999 and contains performances by Murray and a veteran quartet of pianist Roland Hanna, bassist Richard Davis and drummer Victor Lewis.

== Reception ==
The AllMusic review by Scott Yanow stated: "Among the better numbers on this restrained date are 'Spring Will Be a Little Late This Year,' 'The Summer Knows,' 'Autumn in New York,' and 'Snowfall.'"

Professional ratings
Review scores
Source	Rating
AllMusic	3/5 stars
The Penguin Guide to Jazz Recordings	3/4 stars

== Track listing ==
1. "Seasons" (Hanna) – 8:28
2. "Spring Will Be a Little Late This Year" (Loesser) – 5:38
3. "Spring Is Here" (Hart, Rodgers) – 7:58
4. "The Summer Knows" (Bergman, Bergman, Legrand) – 8:55
5. "Indian Summer" (Dubin, Herbert) – 4:51
6. "September Song" (Anderson, Weill) – 8:31
7. "Autumn in New York" (Strouse) – 6:34
8. "September in the Rain" (Dubin, Warren) – 6:49
9. "Snowfall" (Thornhill, Ruth Thornhill) – 7:18
10. "Let It Snow! Let It Snow! Let It Snow!" (Cahn, Styne) – 6:02

- Recorded August 3, 1998

== Personnel ==
- David Murray – tenor saxophone, bass clarinet
- Roland Hanna – piano
- Richard Davis – bass
- Victor Lewis – drums
