= ...So Far =

1999 studio album by D. D. Jackson

Studio album by D. D. Jackson
- Recorded: May 1999
- Genre: Jazz
- Label: RCA

...So Far is a solo piano album by D. D. Jackson recorded in 1999 and released by RCA Records. It won a Juno Award for Contemporary Jazz Album of the Year.

== Recording and music ==
The solo piano album was recorded in May 1999. Most of the twelve tracks were written by Jackson, and are dedicated to influences from jazz and classical music.

== Releases and reception ==
Professional ratings
Review scores
Source	Rating
AllMusic	4/5 stars
The Penguin Guide to Jazz	3.5/4 stars

...So Far was released by RCA Records. The AllMusic reviewer, Michael G. Nastos, wrote: "Jackson is emerging as an original expressionist in his own right, exploring dense harmonies, arpeggiated embellishments, and a fortuitous style of improvising that is nothing less than startling". It won the Best Contemporary (Instrumental) Jazz Album Juno Award in 2000.

== Track listing ==
1. "Suite New York"
2. "Camiliano"
3. "Come Sunday"
4. "Maybe Not"
5. "Playground"
6. "I Mean You"
7. "Sweet Beginnings"
8. "Round and Round"
9. "Waltz for Mr. Hicks"
10. "Goodbye Pork Pie Hat"
11. "Poco-Loco-Moco"
12. "Home"

== Personnel ==
- D. D. Jackson – piano
