= Now Is Another Time =

Studio album by David Murray Latin Big Band
- Released: January 28, 2003
- Recorded: April 2001 – June 2002; Sound On Sound Studio, NYC
- Genre: Jazz
- Length: 72:25
- Label: Justin Time; JUST 161-2
- Producer: Valerie Malot, David Murray

David Murray chronology
Silence (2001)	Now Is Another Time (2003)	Waltz Again (2002)

Now Is Another Time is an album by saxophonist David Murray's Latin Big Band, released on the Canadian Justin Time label.

== Reception ==
Professional ratings
Review scores
Source	Rating
AllMusic	4.5/5 stars
The Penguin Guide to Jazz Recordings	4/4 stars

The AllMusic review by Glenn Astarita stated, "Murray is in top form, evidenced by his climactically driven soloing endeavors -- where he peaks within the upper registers -- via an unrelenting pace. It's all about perpetual motion topped off with a festive sentiment, marked by oscillating Afro-Cuban grooves and a few poignant interludes here and there. But the musicians also utilize space to their advantage, where they often allow any given soloist, ample breathing room to reconfigure previously explored themes. Folks, this is the real deal. An awe-inspiring effort, indeed!" JazzTimes observed, "Murray, unlike most Latin saxophonists, is not what you would consider an in-clave type of player. He often plays on top of the rhythm rather than getting inside. Still, there is much excitement here". All About Jazz said, "When this band is on-target, the results are inspiring. It's too bad they are not consistent in that regard, because the project has enormous potential. Listeners curious about Cuban music, especially its rhythmic element, are likely to find some tasty nuggets here regardless".

== Track listing ==
All compositions by David Murray

1. "Crystal" - 8:32
2. "Aerol's Change" - 7:18
3. "Blue Muse" - 9:11
4. "Break Out" - 11:15
5. "Mambo Dominica" - 9:31
6. "Giovanni's Mission" - 6:34
7. "Sad Kind of Love" - 20:04

== Personnel ==
- David Murray - tenor saxophone
- Cesar Lopez Martinez (tracks 2, 3 & 5–7), Ernesto Varona Rodriguez German (tracks 2, 3 & 5–7), German Fermin (tracks 1 & 4), Roman Feliu O'Reilly (tracks 2, 3 & 5–7), Valazco Urdeliz (tracks 1 & 4), Velasco Urdeliz (tracks 2, 3 & 5–7) - alto saxophone
- Irvin Luichel Acao Sierra, Orlando Sanchez Soto - tenor saxophone (tracks 2, 3 & 5–7)
- Hamiet Bluiett (tracks 2, 3 & 5–7), Moises Marquez Loyva (tracks 1 & 4) - baritone saxophone
- Jose Luis Cortez, Kahil-Ikshr Smith - flute (tracks 2, 3 & 5–7)
- Hugh Ragin (tracks 2, 3 & 5–7), Alexander Brown Cabrera, Bacilio Bernardo Marquez (tracks 1 & 4), Carmelo Andres (tracks 2, 3 & 5–7), Cristobal Ferrer (tracks 2, 3 & 5–7), Elpidio Chappotin Elgado(tracks 2, 3 & 5–7), Rafael Gavilan (tracks 1 & 4) - trumpet
- Craig Harris (tracks 2, 3 & 5–7), Amaury Perez Rodriguez (tracks 2, 3 & 5–7), Boris Sarmiento (tracks 1 & 4), Denis Cuni Rodriguez (tracks 1 & 4), Heikel Fabian Triminio (tracks 1 & 4), Leonardo Alarcon Henville (tracks 2, 3 & 5–7), Sergio Ricardo Luna Longchamp (tracks 2, 3 & 5–7) - trombone
- Carcasses Colon (tracks 1 & 4), Emilio Morales(tracks 2, 3 & 5–7), Luis Manuel Guerra Crespo (tracks 2, 3 & 5–7), Miguel Angel De Armas (tracks 2, 3 & 5–7), Roberto Julio (tracks 1 & 4), Tony Perez (tracks 2, 3 & 5–7) - piano
- Feliciano Arango Noa (tracks 2, 3 & 5–7), Narciso Jorge (tracks 1 & 4), Reyes Hernandez (tracks 1 & 4) - bass
- Giraldo Piloto (tracks 2, 3 & 5–7), Olivier Valdes Rey (tracks 1 & 4) - drums
- Jorge Luis Guerra - guiro (tracks 2, 3 & 5–7)
- Adel Gonzales Gomez (tracks 1 & 4), Evelio Ramos Delfin (tracks 2, 3 & 5–7), Tomas Ramos Ortiz (tracks 2, 3 & 5–7) - congas
- Jose Luis Quintana Fuerte "Changuito" - timbales (track 2)

== Production credits ==
- Dany Gignoux – booklet, photography
