= D. D. Jackson =

Canadian musician and composer (born 1967)

D.D. Jackson
- Born: Robert Cleanth Kai-Nen Jackson; January 25, 1967 (age 59); Ottawa, Ontario, Canada
- Genres: Jazz
- Occupations: Musician, composer
- Instruments: Piano, keyboards
- Years active: Early 1990s–present
- Labels: Justin Time, RCA
- Website: www.ddjackson.com

Robert Cleanth Kai-Nen "D. D." Jackson (born January 25, 1967) is a Canadian–American jazz pianist and composer. His work as a leader or co-leader appears on 13 CDs. He won the Juno Award for Best Contemporary Jazz Album – Instrumental in 2000 for his solo piano disc ...So Far. Jackson has composed operas and has won two Emmy Awards for his work writing for television gaining 5 nominations in all.

== Early life and education ==
Jackson was born on January 25, 1967, in Ottawa, Ontario. "D. D." comes from the word for "little brother" in Mandarin Chinese, which was used by his family. He is a dual citizen of Canada and the United States. He started playing the piano at the age of six. After graduating with a degree in classical music from Indiana University in 1989, Jackson moved to New York, where he took a master's degree in jazz at the Manhattan School of Music. The pianist Don Pullen was his mentor, and Jackson also took private lessons with Jaki Byard.

== Later life and career ==
Jackson first played with David Murray in the early 1990s. He was the music director for Mytholojazz on Broadway in 1999, for which he also played onstage. After some albums for Justin Time Records, Jackson recorded two for RCA Records in 1999. For the first of these, ...So Far, he won the "Best Contemporary (Instrumental) Jazz Album" Juno Award in 2000. He also recorded Gershwin's Rhapsody in Blue for Summit Records in 2002.

Jackson's first opera, Quebecité, premiered in 2003, and was followed three years later by Trudeau: Long March/Shining Path, and a musical comedy, Depressed, Depressed. He was one of the composers for the children's TV show Wonder Pets!, and scored the entire 26-episode season of The Ocean Room, another children's TV show.

For five years, Jackson also wrote a regular column for DownBeat magazine entitled "Living Jazz". He began teaching at Hunter College in 2009, and at the Harlem School of the Arts in 2011.

As of August 2018, Jackson has also been an adjunct associate professor at the Brooklyn College's Conservatory of Music where he acts as professor in Jazz and Media Scoring as well as the Big Band Director.

Jackson has been one of three main composers on the children's TV program Peg + Cat for many years, garnering him a Daytime Emmy Award for Outstanding Music Direction and Composition in 2016 and a second Emmy in 2019 for Outstanding Original Song, "A World Made By Friends" (shared with lyricist, Billy Aronson). He has received a total of five Emmy nominations during his time on the show.

== Playing style ==
"Known for an energetic, even daring, approach to keyboard playing, Jackson routinely pushes his technical limits, using cross-rhythms or different meters in each hand, playing clusters with his palms or arms, and standing to sound thunderous chords at both ends of the piano simultaneously."

== Discography ==
=== As leader ===
Year recorded	Title	Label	Notes
1994	Peace-Song	Justin Time	With David Murray (tenor sax), John Geggie (bass), Jean Martin (drums)
1996?	Rhythm-Dance	Justin Time	Trio, with John Geggie (bass), Jean Martin (drums)
1996	Paired Down, Vol. 1	Justin Time	Duos, with Hugh Ragin (trumpet), James Carter (tenor sax, C-melody sax), David Murray (tenor sax), Hamiet Bluiett (baritone sax), Billy Bang (violin), Santi Debriano (bass)
1997	Paired Down, Vol. 2	Justin Time	Duos, with Ray Anderson (trombone), David Murray (tenor sax), Don Byron (clarinet), Jane Bunnett (flute), Santi Debriano (bass)
1998?	Same Space	Justin Time	Trio, co-led with Hamiett Bluiett (baritone sax, bass clarinet, wood flute), Mor Thiam (percussion, vocals)
1999?	Join Us	Justin Time	Trio, co-led with Hamiett Bluiett (baritone sax, clarinet, wood flute), Mor Thiam (percussion, vocals)
1999	...So Far	RCA Victor	Solo piano
1999	Anthem	RCA Victor	With Christian Howes (violin, guitar), Richard Bona (electric bass, vocals), Jack DeJohnette (drums), Mino Cinelu (percussion); James Carter (sax) added for some tracks
2001	Sigame	Justin Time	With Christian Howes (violin), Ugonna Okegwo (bass)
2001?	The Calling	Justin Time	Trio, co-led with Hamiett Bluiett (baritone sax, wooden flute, clarinet), Kahil El'Zabar (drums, percussion, vocals)
2002	Suite for New York	Justin Time	With Brad Turner (trumpet), Tom Walsh (trombone), James Spaulding (alto sax, flute), David Mott (baritone sax), Christian Howes (violin), Ugonna Okegwo (bass), Dafnis Prieto (drums, percussion)
2005–06	Serenity Song	Justin Time	With Dana Leong (trombone, cello), Sam Newsome (soprano sax), David Mott (baritone sax), Christian Howes (violin), Ugonna Okegwo (bass), Dafnis Prieto (drums, percussion)

=== As sideman ===
With Billy Bang

- Bang On! (Justin Time, 1997)

With James Carter

- Present Tense (EmArcy, 2008)

With David Murray

- Long Goodbye: A Tribute to Don Pullen (DIW, 1996)
- Creole (Justin Time, 1998)
- Octet Plays Trane (Justin Time, 2000)

With ProMusica Chamber Orchestra

- American Jazz Concertos (Summit, 2002)

With the World Saxophone Quartet

- M'Bizo (Justin Time, 1999)
