= Fo Deuk Revue =

Studio album by David Murray
- Released: 1997
- Recorded: June 3–4, 1996
- Genre: Jazz
- Length: 55:58
- Label: Justin Time
- Producer: David Murray

David Murray chronology
| Long Goodbye: A Tribute to Don Pullen (1996) | Fo Deuk Revue (1997) | Creole (1997) |

Fo Deuk Revue is an album by David Murray released on the Canadian Justin Time label. Recorded in 1996 and released in 1997, the album features performances by Murray with Darryl Burgee, Ousseynou Diop, Assane Diop, Craig Harris, Robert Irving III, Abdou Karim Mané, Oumar Mboup, Hugh Ragin, Doudou N'Diaye Rose, Moussa Séné, El Hadji Gniancou Sembène and Jamaaladeen Tacuma. The vocalists included Amiri Baraka, Amiri Baraka Jr., Didier Awadi and Amadou Barry from Positive Black Soul, Tidiane Gaye, Hamet Maal, and Junior Soul.

== Reception ==
The AllMusic review awarded the album 2.5 stars.

Professional ratings
Review scores
| Source | Rating |
|---|---|
| AllMusic | 2.5/5 stars |
| The Penguin Guide to Jazz Recordings | 2.5/4 stars |

== Track listing ==
1. "Blue Muse" (Irving, Murray) - 8:59
2. "Evidence" (Murray) - 5:58
3. "One World Family" (Awadi, Barry, Gaye, Murray) - 8:42
4. "Too Many Hungry People" (Irving) - 5:16
5. "Chant Africain" (Traditional) - 6:59
6. "Abdoul Aziz Sy" (Dieuf Dieul, Gaye) - 6:29
7. "Village Urbana" (Awadi, Barry, Irving) - 7:15
8. "Thilo" (Dieuf Dieul, Gaye) - 6:20
- Recorded on June 3 & 4, 1996, at Studio 2000, Senegal

== Personnel ==
- David Murray - tenor saxophone, bass clarinet
- Didier Awadi (Positive Black Soul) - rap
- Amiri Baraka - poetry recitation
- Amiri Baraka Jr. - voice
- Amadou Barry (Positive Black Soul) - rap
- Darryl Burgee - drums
- Ousseynou Diop - drums
- Assane Diop - guitar and xalam
- Tidiane Gaye - voice
- Craig Harris - trombone
- Robert Irving III - piano
- Hamet Maal - voice
- Abdou Karim Mané - bass
- Oumar M’boup - djembe and percussion
- Hugh Ragin - trumpet
- Doudou N'Diaye Rose - sabar and voice
- El Hadji Gniancou Sembène - keyboard
- Moussa Séné - vocals and percussion
- Junior Soul - voice
- Jamaaladeen Tacuma - bass guitar
