= Spirituals (David Murray album) =

1988 studio album by David Murray

Studio album by David Murray
- Released: 1988
- Recorded: January 1988
- Genre: Jazz
- Length: 48:16
- Label: DIW
- Producer: Kazunori Sugiyama

David Murray chronology
Deep River (1988)	Spirituals (1988)	Ming's Samba (1988)

Spirituals is an album by American saxophonist David Murray released on the Japanese DIW label in 1988. It features seven quartet performances by Murray with Fred Hopkins, Dave Burrell and Ralph Peterson Jr.

== Reception ==
The Allmusic review by Scott Yanow awarded the album 3 stars stating "David Murray mostly sticks to spirituals on this Japanese import, a quartet outing with pianist Dave Burrell, bassist Fred Hopkins and drummer Ralph Peterson, but that does not mean that all of the improvising is mellow and melodic. There are some peaceful moments on tunes such as "Amazing Grace" and a spirited "Down by the Riverside," but Murray's playing is so violent on "Abel's Blissed Out Blues" as to be almost satirical. A mixed success from the masterful tenor.".

Professional ratings
Review scores
Source	Rating
Allmusic	3/5 stars
The Penguin Guide to Jazz Recordings	3.5/4 stars
Tom Hull	A−

== Track listing ==
All compositions by David Murray except as indicated

1. "Amazing Grace" (Newton) – 5:43
2. "Dave Blue" (Burrell) 7:50
3. "Blues for My Sisters (For Barbara and Michelle)" – 8:15
4. "Nobody Knows the Trouble I've Seen/Down by the Riverside" (Traditional) – 4:24
5. "Sunlit on a Dark Afternoon" – 6:30
6. "Crucifixion" (Traditional) – 5:23
7. "Abel's Blissed Out Blues" (Burrell) – 10:27

== Personnel ==
- David Murray – tenor saxophone
- Dave Burrell – piano
- Fred Hopkins – bass
- Ralph Peterson Jr. – drums
