= Let the Music Take You =

Live album by David Murray
- Released: 1978
- Recorded: January 30, 1978
- Genre: Jazz
- Length: 44:56
- Label: Marge Records

David Murray chronology
Live at the Lower Manhattan Ocean Club (1978)	Let the Music Take You (1978)	Last of the Hipman (1978)

Professional ratings
Review scores
Source	Rating
Allmusic	?

Let the Music Take You is a live album by David Murray. It was originally released on Marge Records in 1978 and re-released in 1993 on CD. It features a live performance by Murray, cornetist Butch Morris, bassist Johnny Dyani and drummer George Brown recorded in concert in Rouen, France, on January 30, 1978. The album Last of the Hipman (Red, 1978) was recorded at the same concert.

== Track listing ==
1. "The Fast Life" - 12:22
2. "Monikole" (Morris) - 10:56
3. "Let The Music Take You" - 9:26
4. "The Hill" - 12:12

All compositions by David Murray except as indicated
- Recorded live in Rouen, France, January 30, 1978

== Personnel ==
- David Murray: tenor saxophone
- Lawrence "Butch" Morris: cornet
- Johnny Dyani: bass
- George Brown: drums
