= Lucky Four (album) =

Studio album by David Murray
- Released: 1989
- Recorded: September 25, 1988
- Genre: Jazz
- Length: 60:21
- Label: Tutu
- Producer: Horst Weber

David Murray chronology
Tenors (1988)	Lucky Four (1989)	Special Quartet (1990)

Lucky Four is an album by David Murray released on the Tutu label. It was recorded in 1988, released in 1989, and features eight quartet performances by Murray with Wilber Morris, Dave Burrell and Victor Lewis.

== Reception ==
The Allmusic review by Brian Olewnick awarded the album 4 stars, stating: "The late '80s produced some of Murray's strongest work in the quartet format, and Lucky Four fits in quite comfortably. Recommended."

Professional ratings
Review scores
Source	Rating
Allmusic	4/5 stars

== Track listing ==
1. "Valley Talk" (Burrell) - 5:31
2. "Chazz (For Charles Mingus)" (Morris) - 8:52
3. "As I Woke" (Morris) - 6:41
4. "Strollin' (For Jean Michel Basquiat)" (Mwanga) - 2:51
5. "Abel's Blissed Out Blues" (Burrell) - 10:34
6. "Sharing" (Morris) - 12:23
7. "As I Woke" [2nd Version] (Morris) - 8:01
8. "Valley Talk" [2nd Version] (Burrell) - 5:28

- Recorded September 25, 1988 at Trixi Studio, Munich

== Personnel ==
- David Murray - tenor saxophone
- Dave Burrell - piano
- Wilber Morris - bass
- Victor Lewis - drums
