= Silence (David Murray and Mal Waldron album) =

Studio album by David Murray & Mal Waldron
- Released: 2008
- Recorded: October 5–6, 2001; Brussels, Belgium
- Genre: Jazz
- Length: 66:34
- Label: Justin Time; JUST 186-2
- Producer: David Murray

David Murray & Mal Waldron chronology
Yonn-Dé (2001)	Silence (2008)	Waltz Again (2002)

Silence is an album of duets by saxophonist David Murray and pianist Mal Waldron recorded in Brussels and released on the Canadian Justin Time label. Recorded in 2001, but not released until 2008, six years after Waldron died, the album features some of his last recorded performances.

== Reception ==
The Allmusic review by Michael G. Nastos awarded the album 4 stars stating "these two play as one marvelously, with all the depth and substance you could ever wish for. Listeners should be glad these sessions were unearthed, for they are welcome additions to the legacy of two great creative jazz icons." On All About Jazz, Jerry D'Souza said "The album is sublime, energetic, and, in the final analysis, unforgettable".

Professional ratings
Review scores
Source	Rating
Allmusic	4/5 stars

== Track listing ==
All compositions by Mal Waldron except as indicated

1. "Free for C.T. - 10:47
2. "Silence" (David Murray) - 3:34
3. "Hurray for Herbie" - 7:57
4. "I Should Care" (Sammy Cahn, Axel Stordahl, Paul Weston) - 12:40
5. "Jean-Pierre" (Miles Davis) - 10:07
6. "All Too Soon" (Duke Ellington, Carl Sigman) - 7:12
7. "Soul Eyes" - 14:17

== Personnel ==
- David Murray - tenor saxophone, bass clarinet
- Mal Waldron - piano
