= The Healers (album) =

1987 album by David Murray and Randy Weston

Studio album by David Murray
- Released: 1987
- Recorded: September 26, 1987
- Genre: Jazz
- Length: 43:35
- Label: Black Saint
- Producer: Giovanni Bonandrini

David Murray chronology
Hope Scope (1987)	The Healers (1987)	The People's Choice (1987)

The Healers is an album by David Murray and Randy Weston, released on the Italian Black Saint label in 1987. It features duo performances by Murray and Weston.

== Reception ==
The AllMusic review by Scott Yanow stated: "This set of duets by David Murray (doubling on tenor and bass clarinet) and pianist Randy Weston is a bit of a surprise. Rather than performing standards or some of Weston's 'hits,' the duo stretches out on three obscurities by the two musicians (only Weston's 'Blue Moses' is slightly known) and Butch Morris' 'Clever Beggar.' Weston provides a solid harmonic and rhythmic foundation for Murray's thick-toned but sometimes screeching flights, and the combination works pretty well."

Professional ratings
Review scores
Source	Rating
AllMusic	4/5 stars
The Penguin Guide to Jazz Recordings	3/4 stars

== Track listing ==
1. "Clever Beggar" (Butch Morris) - 8:15
2. "The Healers" (Randy Weston) - 14:19
3. "M'Bizo" (David Murray) - 6:12
4. "Blue Moses" (Randy Weston) - 14:49

- Recorded at Seltzer Sound, New York City, September 26, 1987.

== Personnel ==
- David Murray - tenor saxophone, bass clarinet
- Randy Weston - piano
