= Last of the Hipman =

Live album by David Murray
- Released: 1978
- Recorded: January 30, 1978
- Genre: Jazz
- Length: 45:32
- Label: Red

David Murray chronology
Let the Music Take You (1978)	Last of the Hipman (1978)	Interboogieology (1978)

Professional ratings
Review scores
Source	Rating
The Rolling Stone Jazz Record Guide	3/5 stars

Last of the Hipman is a live album by David Murray released on the Italian Red label. It was recorded in 1978 and features performances by Murray, Butch Morris, Johnny Dyani and George Brown. The album Let the Music Take You (1978) was recorded at the same concert.

== Track listing ==
1. "Monk’s Notice" (James Newton) - 21:41
2. "Patricia" - 13:17
3. "Last Of The Hipmen" - 10:34

All compositions by David Murray except as indicated
- Recorded in concert in Rouen on January 30th 1978

== Personnel ==
- David Murray: tenor saxophone
- Butch Morris: trumpet
- Johnny Dyani: bass
- George Brown: drums
