= Marta Sanchez (pianist) =

Spanish jazz pianist

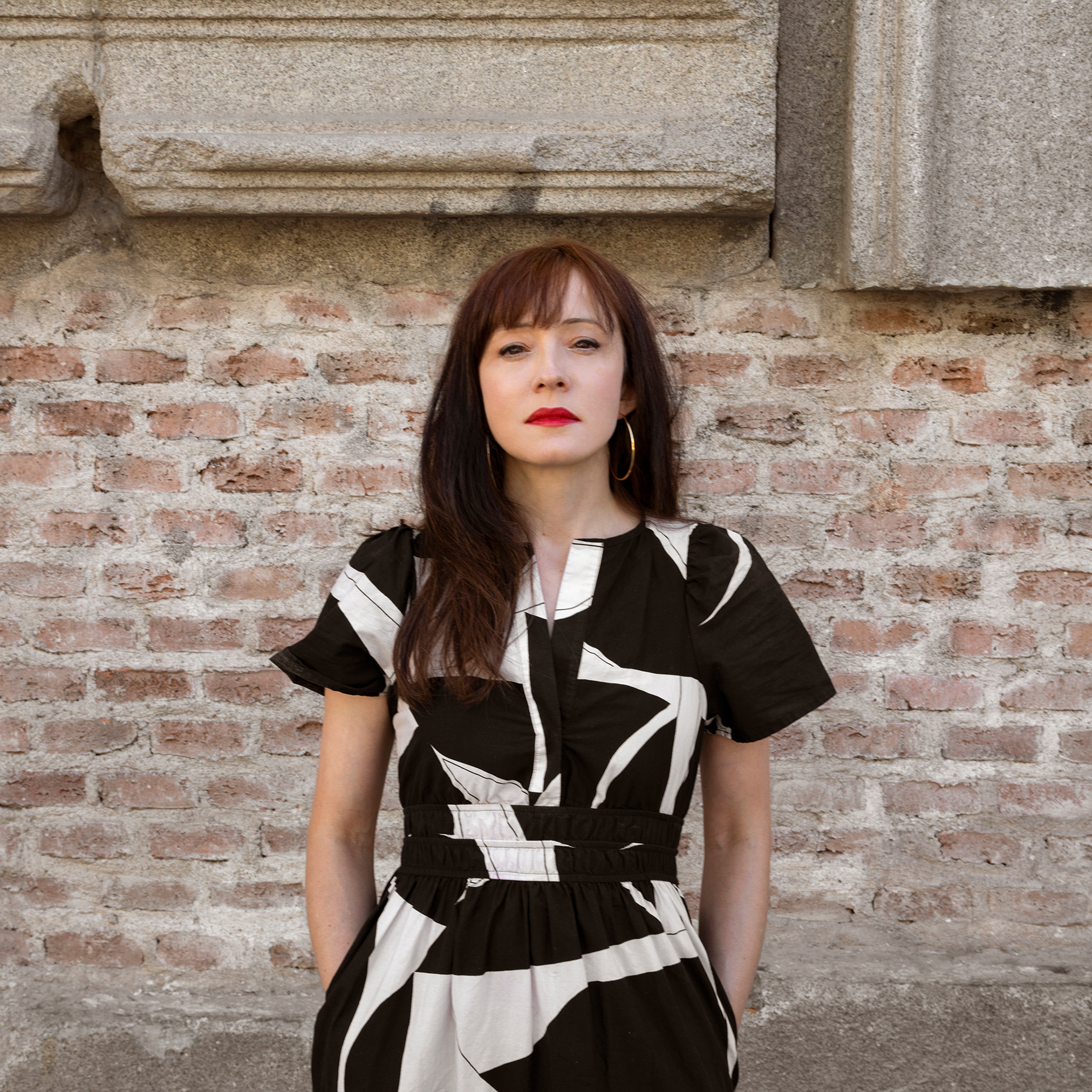
- Born: 1983 (age 42–43); Madrid, Spain
- Occupation: Musician
- Years active: 2006–present
- Website: martasanchezmusic.com

Marta Sanchez is a Spanish jazz pianist and composer.

== Career ==
Sanchez moved to New York City from Madrid, Spain in 2011 after receiving a Fulbright Scholarship to study Jazz Performance at New York University.

Her albums as a leader have been covered by The New York Times, The Wall Street Journal, and NPR. In 2015, Ben Ratliff at The New York Times included Sanchez's album "Partenika" in a list of the 10 best albums of the year. In 2019, Giovanni Russonello at The New York Times included her album "El Rayo de Luz" in a list of the 10 best jazz albums of the year.

In 2022, Sanchez joined David Murray's quartet. In 2023 and 2024 they performed at the Village Vanguard. As part of Murray's quartet, Sanchez recorded on "Francesca" (2024, Intakt Records).

In 2017, and 2021, Sanchez was a composer in residence at MacDowell.

== Discography ==
=== As a leader ===
Release year	Title	Label	Personnel
2026	For the Space You Left	Out of Your Head Records	solo prepared piano
2024	Perpetual Void	Intakt	Christopher Tordini (bass), Savannah Harris (drums)
2022	SAAM (Spanish American Art Museum)	Whirlwind	Ambrose Akinmusire (trumpet, track 5), Charlotte Greve (synths, track 5), Camila Meza (voice and guitar, track 5), Alex LoRe (alto saxophone), Roman Filiu (tenor saxophone), Rashaan Carter (bass), Allan Mednard (drums)
2019	El Rayo de Luz	Fresh Sound	Roman Filiu (alto saxophone), Chris Cheek (tenor saxophone), Rick Rosato (bass), Daniel Dor (drums)
2017	Danza Imposible	Fresh Sound	Roman Filiu (alto saxophone), Jerome Sabbagh (tenor saxophone), Rick Rosato (bass), Daniel Dor (drums)
2015	Partenika	Fresh Sound	Roman Filiu (alto saxophone), Jerome Sabbagh (tenor saxophone), Sam Anning (bass), Jason Burger (drums)
2011	La Espiral Amarilla	Errabal	Ariel Bringuez (tenor saxophone, soprano saxophone), Reinier Elizarde (bass), Andrés Litwin (drums)
2008	Lunas, Soles y Elefantes	Errabal	Carlos Barretto (bass), Andrés Litwin (drums)

=== As a sidewoman ===
Release year	Artist	Title	Label
2024	Maria Grand	Altered Visions	Lilaila
2024	David Murray	Francesca	Intakt
2024	Maria Grand	Anohin	Biophilia
2023	Ludovica Burtone	Sparks	Outside In Music
2023	Alex Weiss	Most Don't Have Enough	ears&eyes
2019	Wing Walker Orchestra	Hazel	ears&eyes
2018	Indra Rios-Moore	Carry My Heart	Impulse!
2018	The Crooked Trio (Oscar Noriega)	Deluxe	Barbès Records
2015	John Blevins	Matterhorn	pfMENTUM
2013	Albert Alabedra	Albert Alabedra Featuring Alba Marbà. Barcelona New York Vol.1	Self Released
