= Lovers (David Murray album) =

Studio album by David Murray
- Released: 1988
- Recorded: January 1988
- Genre: Jazz
- Length: 48:38
- Label: DIW
- Producer: Kazunori Sugiyama

David Murray chronology
Ming's Samba (1988)	Lovers (1988)	Tenors (1988)

Professional ratings
Review scores
Source	Rating
AllMusic	4.5/5 stars
The Penguin Guide to Jazz Recordings	4/4 stars

Lovers is an album by David Murray, released on the Japanese DIW label in 1988. It features six quartet performances by Murray with Fred Hopkins, Dave Burrell and Ralph Peterson Jr.

== Track listing ==
1. "Teardrops for Jimmy (Dedicated to Jimmy Garrison)" (Burrell) - 7:57
2. "Lovers" - 7:40
3. "In a Sentimental Mood" (Ellington, Kurtz, Mills) - 8:49
4. "Ming" - 9:48
5. "Water Colors" (Peterson) - 6:47
6. "Nalungo (For Nalungo Mwanga)" (Kunle Mwanga) - 7:49

All compositions by David Murray except as indicated

== Personnel ==
- David Murray - tenor saxophone
- Dave Burrell - piano
- Fred Hopkins - bass
- Ralph Peterson Jr. - drums
