= Love and Sorrow =

Studio album by David Murray Quartet
- Released: 1996
- Recorded: September 14–17, 1993; Sound On Sound, NYC
- Genre: Jazz
- Length: 55:41
- Label: DIW; DIW 921
- Producer: Kazunori Sugiyama

David Murray chronology
For Aunt Louise (1993)	Love and Sorrow (1996)	Shakill's II (1993)

Love and Sorrow is an album by David Murray which was recorded in 1993 and released on the Japanese DIW label. It features performances by Murray's Quartet which included John Hicks and Fred Hopkins.

== Reception ==
Allmusic awarded the album 3 stars".

Professional ratings
Review scores
Source	Rating
Allmusic	3/5 stars

== Track listing ==
1. "You'd Be So Nice to Come Home To" (Cole Porter) - 9:14
2. "Old Folks" (Dedette Lee Hill, Willard Robison) - 10:47
3. "Forever I Love You" (Tex Allen) - 5:25
4. "Sorrow Song (For W.E.B. Dubois)" (David Murray) - 12:28
5. "A Flower Is a Lovesome Thing" (Billy Strayhorn) - 6:29
6. "You Don't Know What Love Is" (Gene de Paul, Don Raye) - 11:18

== Personnel ==
- David Murray - tenor saxophone, bass clarinet
- John Hicks - piano
- Fred Hopkins - bass
- Idris Muhammad - drums
