= Octet Plays Trane =

Studio album by David Murray Octet
- Released: 2000
- Recorded: April 30–May 1, 1999
- Genre: Jazz
- Length: 69:23
- Label: Justin Time
- Producer: David Murray

David Murray chronology
| Speaking in Tongues (1999) | Octet Plays Trane (2000) | Like a Kiss that Never Ends (2001) |

Professional ratings
Review scores
| Source | Rating |
|---|---|
| AllMusic | 4.5/5 stars |
| The Encyclopedia of Popular Music | 4/5 stars |
| Los Angeles Times | 3.5/4 stars |
| The Penguin Guide to Jazz Recordings | 3.5/4 stars |

Octet Plays Trane is an album by the David Murray Octet, released in 2000 on Justin Time. The musicians include Murray, Rasul Siddik, Hugh Ragin, Craig Harris, James Spaulding, Ravi Best, D. D. Jackson, Mark Johnson and Jaribu Shahid. The album contains Murray's versions of compositions by John Coltrane, and is dedicated to Bob Thiele.

== Critical reception ==
The AllMusic review by Al Campbell stated: "The proceedings wind down with an engaging 15-minute version of 'A Love Supreme: Part 1: Acknowledgment' proving Murray has studied not only the music of John Coltrane, but like him insists on applying his individuality through his horn." Phoenix New Times wrote that Murray "thrashes through Coltrane's ballads and bombastic classics ... supported by trombone/trumpet/sax arrangements so bent they probably scared off the major labels." The Independent declared that "Murray is one of very few contemporary saxophonists able to invoke the hallowed name of Coltrane without inviting sneers, and he does the master proud here with suitably bluesy re-arrangements of six classics."

== Track listing ==
All compositions by John Coltrane except where noted.

1. "Giant Steps" - 14:02
2. "Naima" - 7:34
3. "The Crossing" (Murray) - 10:33
4. "India" - 8:48
5. "Lazy Bird" - 13:06
6. "A Love Supreme, Part 1: Acknowledgement" - 15:20

== Personnel ==
- David Murray – tenor saxophone, bass clarinet
- Rasul Siddik – trumpet
- Hugh Ragin – trumpet
- Ravi Best – trumpet
- Craig Harris – trombone
- James Spaulding – alto saxophone, flute
- D. D. Jackson – piano
- Mark Johnson – drums
- Jaribu Shahid – bass
