= Lafayette Gilchrist =

American jazz pianist and composer (born 1967)

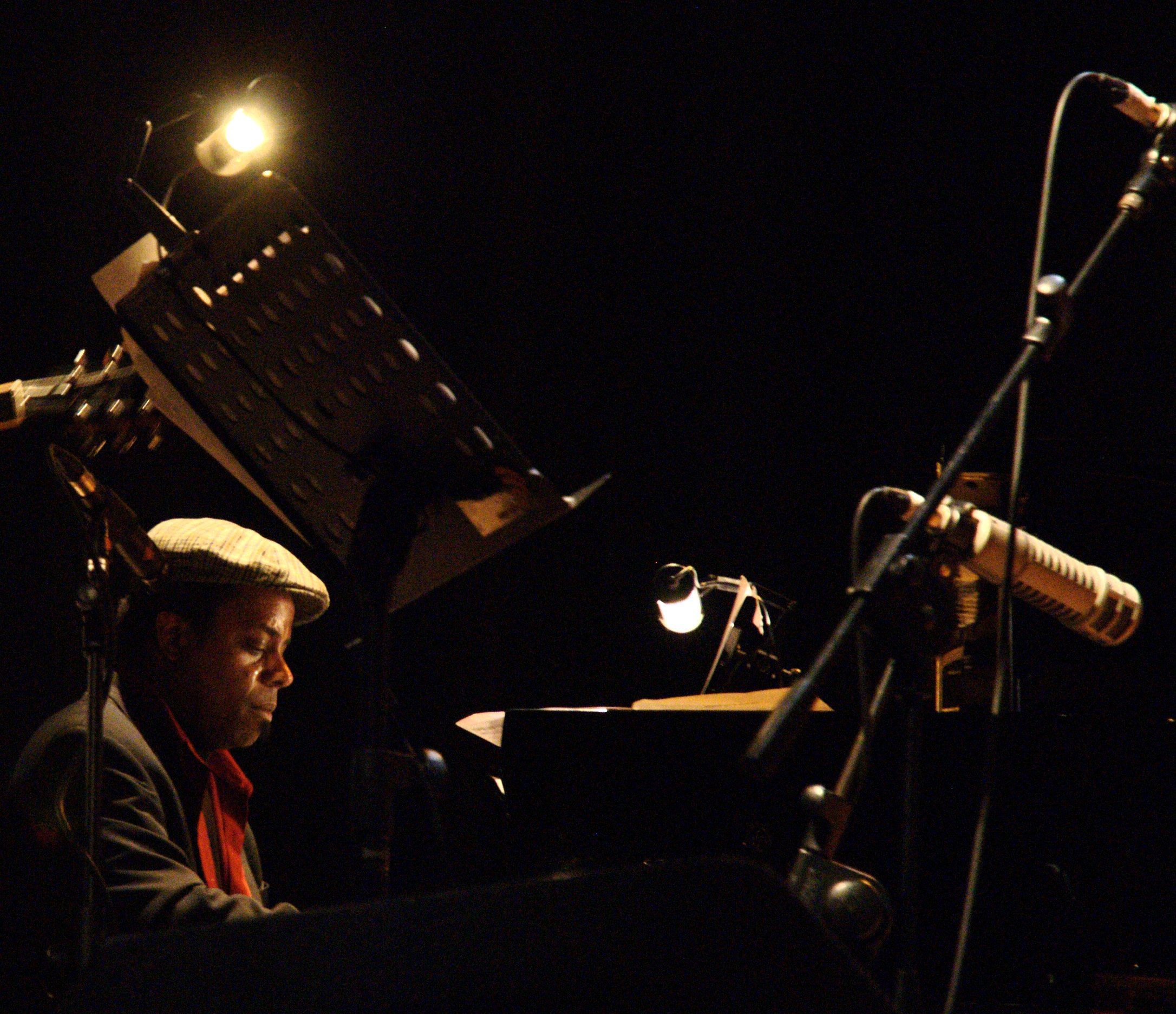
- Lafayette Gilchrist in Milan, Italy, on January 28, 2008

Background information
- Born: August 3, 1967 (age 59); Washington, D.C., United States
- Genres: Jazz
- Occupations: Musician, composer
- Instrument: Piano

Lafayette Gilchrist (born August 3, 1967) is an American jazz pianist and composer. As of January 2014, he lived in Baltimore. He has had a long association with saxophonist David Murray, with whom he has toured internationally.

Gilchrist leads an octet/nonet named the New Volcanoes, and a trio called Inside Out (with bassist Michael Formanek and drummer Eric Kennedy). Gilchrist acknowledges multiple influences on his music: "I come from hip-hop culture, [...] I'm not a rapper. I'm not a DJ. I'm not a dancer. But I feed off of all that. All of that's part of what I grew up in, what I grew up around."

== Early life ==
Gilchrist was born in Washington, D.C., on August 3, 1967; he also grew up there. His mother, Janice Taylor Murdock, worked for the Federal Aviation Administration. As a child, "his musical interests were Stevie Wonder, The Jackson 5 and other soulful greats that flooded the airwaves of Black radio." Gilchrist's mother remarried when he was 14, at which point they moved to Prince George's County. He also enjoyed the local go-go at this time, and listened to Chuck Brown practicing near his aunt's home. Brown played jazz standards in a different style; Gilchrist observed that "it taught me that you can combine funk grooves and jazz".

In his late teens, Gilchrist took up boxing and considered joining the army, but was steered away from both by his stepfather. Gilchrist moved to Baltimore when he was 17, to study economics at the University of Maryland, Baltimore County. He started playing the piano at the same time – he stated that he started practicing in the piano rooms of his university after briefly playing the Steinway grand in its recital hall while a summer school student before beginning his degree. He taught himself to play and compose music, and received feedback on his compositions from music students. He graduated in 1992, with a BA in African-American studies.

== Career ==
In 1993 Gilchrist formed the New Volcanoes, as a quartet that also contained trumpeter Freddie Dunn, bassist Vince Loving, and drummer Nate Reynolds. Trumpeter and sound engineer Mike Cerri was soon added, and Gilchrist recorded his first album, The Art Is Life, as a sextet with James Dephilipo added on euphonium. This was self-released, as was Gilchrist's second album, Asphalt Revolt. He played with the New Volcanoes and gave solo performances on the East Coast for several years after graduating.

He first met Murray in 1999: Gilchrist introduced himself and later sent the saxophonist a recording of his playing. They played together a few weeks later, and the pianist joined Murray's band after a few more weeks had passed. Their first gig together was at the Iridium Jazz Club in New York City in April 2000. Gilchrist subsequently obtained a recording contract with Hyena Records, but decided to remain in Baltimore, based on his belief that New York-based musicians tend to converge on a particular style of playing.

Gilchrist gradually built the sound of the New Volcanoes by adding particular musicians on different instruments, particularly Gabriel Ware on alto saxophone and Greg Thompkins on tenor. The latter commented that the pianist "does look at the horn section as a choir, [...] But it's a choir where anyone can get the spirit and take off". The first release of original material on Hyena was 2005's Towards the Shining Path, which received little attention, as Gilchrist did not have enough money to pay for the whole band to tour. To develop his reputation and capacity to tour, Gilchrist formed a more commercially viable band, a trio, with Anthony "Blue" Jenkins on bass and Reynolds on drums; they created the album Three.

Gilchrist's 2008 New Volcanoes album Soul Progressin' received a four-star review from Down Beat, which commented that "Gilchrist's sanguine melodies, vulnerable and gospelized, distinguish the music from M-Base's cool austerity." A 2012 recording of the same group also contained a mix of styles: one reviewer described one track from It Came from Baltimore: Live at the Windup Space Vol. 1 as containing elements of "Pop and the avant-garde, old and new, free-jazz and funk, hip-hop and rock, modernist dissonance and sentimental grooves". Gilchrist also leads a trio called Inside Out, with Michael Formanek (bass) and Eric Kennedy (drums). Gilchrist's New Urban World Blues was a musical re-telling of the 2015 Baltimore uprising that began with the death of a young African American man and is chronicled in the song "Blues for Freddie Gray". A 4-volume set titled Compendium was released on Manta Ray Records in 2017. Gilchrist became part of The Sun Ra Arkestra in 2025.

His composition "Assume the Position" was used in the score for the HBO drama television series The Wire. His compositions have also been used in the HBO series Treme and The Deuce.

== Playing style and influences ==
An NPR reviewer commented that Gilchrist's "two-handed piano [...] has techno and minimalism behind it. It's not just about the notes; it's also about the waves in which they come, and the troughs in between". Gilchrist himself indicated in 2007 that "I'm always seeking a dialogue between popular rhythms and the improvising process [...] For me to make personal music, I have to come out of the music I grew up with and love, and that's hip-hop and go-go." A JazzTimes writer in 2025 summarised: "The underlying vocabulary comes from Coltranesque classicism for the Murray octet, Washington go-go for the New Volcanoes, Baltimore house music for the Sonic Trip Masters [another Gilchrist band] and what one might call 'Saturn stride' for the Arkestra."

== Composing style ==
Gilchrist has stated that his compositions for the New Volcanoes "build from small things to big things, from settlements to villages to cities; I never start with the whole city. [...] That's what we're all about: breaking the music up in the middle and then re-gathering the pieces". Following the approach of Duke Ellington, Gilchrist prefers to compose pieces for specific members of his band, instead of for particular instruments. In 2007, he commented on the political element of his compositions: "everything I write about, in my music, has a political slant to it. It comes from basically a very, very disturbed young black man. And at times angry, furious. But if that anger doesn't have a spiritual dimension, you're going to be in a lot of trouble".

== Discography ==
An asterisk (*) indicates that the year is that of release.

=== As leader ===
Year recorded	Title	Label	Personnel/Notes
After 1993	The Art Is Life	Lafayette Gilchrist	Sextet, with Freddie Dunn, Mike Cerri (trumpet), James Dephilipo (euphonium), Vince Loving (bass), Nate Reynolds (drums)
2001*	Collagic Dreams	Lafayette Gilchrist	
2002*	Asphalt Revolt	Lafayette Gilchrist	Sextet, with John Dierker (sax), Freddie Dunn, Mike Cerri (trumpet), Vince Loving (bass), Nate Reynolds (drums)
2004*	The Music According to Lafayette Gilchrist	Hyena	Compilation of tracks from Collagic Dreams and Asphalt Revolt
2005*	Towards the Shining Path	Hyena	Septet, with John Dierker, Gregory Thompkins (tenor sax), Gabriel Ware (alto sax), Mike Cerri (trumpet), Anthony "Blue" Jenkins (bass), Nate Reynolds (drums)
2007*	Three	Hyena	Trio, with Anthony "Blue" Jenkins (bass), Nate Reynolds (drums)
2006	Duets: Live at the Vision Festival	Hyena	Duo, with Hamid Drake (drums); in concert
2008*	Soul Progressin'	Hyena	Octet, with John Dierker (tenor sax, bass clarinet), Gregory Thompkins (tenor sax), Gabriel Ware (alto sax), Mike Cerri, Freddie Dunn (trumpet), Anthony Jenkins (bass), Nate Reynolds (drums)
2011	It Came from Baltimore: Live at the Windup Space Vol. 1		Nonet; in concert
2014*	The View from Here		Solo piano
2014*	The Go-Go Suite	Creative Differences	Nonet, with Michael Cerri (trumpet), John Dierker, Tiffany DeFoe, Gregory Thompkins (reeds), Carl Filipiak (guitar), Anthony "Blue" Jenkins (bass), Kevin Pinder (percussion), Nathan Reynolds (drums)
2016	Dark Matter	(Self-release)	Solo piano, in concert
2017*	Compendium	Manta Ray	
2017*	New Urban World Blues	Manta Ray	with Michael Cerri and Camilla Campos-Cerri (trumpet), John Dierker, Tiffany DeFoe and Gregory Thompkins (reeds), Carl Filipiak (guitar), Anthony "Blue" Jenkins (bass), Kevin Pinder (percussion), Nathan Reynolds (drums)
2018*	Deep Dancing Suite	Manta Ray	With Michael Cerri and Camilla Campos-Cerri (trumpet), John Dierker, Tiffany DeFoe and Gregory Thompkins (reeds), Carl Filipiak (guitar), Anthony "Blue" Jenkins (bass), Kevin Pinder (percussion), Nathan Reynolds (drums)
2019	Now	Lafayette Gilchrist	With Herman Burnie (bass), Eric Kennedy (drums)
2023*	Undaunted	Morphius	With Brian Settles (tenor sax), Herman Burney (bass), Christian Hizon (trombone), Eric Kennedy (drums), Kevin Pinder (percussion)
2024	Move with Love	Morphius	Most tracks with Leo Maxey (trumpet), Christian Hizon (trombone), Shaquim Muldrow (tenor sax), Carl Filipiak (guitar), Anthony 'Blue' Jenkins (bass guitar), Kevin Pinder (drums), Bash Rose (percussion); some tracks with Efraim Dorsey (tenor sax) and Ebban Dorsey (alto sax) added; in concert

=== As sideman ===
Year recorded	Leader	Title	Label
2010	Mihály Dresch	Sharing the Shed	BMC
2006*	Mudfoot Jones / The Basement Boys	The Basement Boys Present Mudfoot Jones	Savoy
2002	David Murray	Waltz Again	Justin Time
2006	David Murray	Sacred Ground	Justin Time
2007	David Murray	Live in Berlin	Jazzwerkstatt
2009	Hal Singer	Challenge	Marge

Main sources:
