= Tenors (album) =

Studio album by David Murray
- Released: 1988
- Recorded: January 1988
- Genre: Jazz
- Length: 48:38
- Label: DIW
- Producer: Kazunori Sugiyama

David Murray chronology
Lovers (1988)	Tenors (1988)	Lucky Four (1988)

Tenors is an album by David Murray, released on the Japanese DIW label in 1988. It features six quartet performances by Murray with Fred Hopkins, Dave Burrell and Ralph Peterson Jr. As the title indicates, the album features songs written by or associated with tenor saxophonists.

== Reception ==
The AllMusic review by Al Campbell stated, "As with most of Murray's recordings for DIW, Tenors is worth picking up despite the inflated import price tag."

Professional ratings
Review scores
Source	Rating
AllMusic	3/5 stars
The Penguin Guide to Jazz Recordings	3.5/4 stars

== Track listing ==
1. "Equinox" (John Coltrane) – 6:17
2. "Ghosts" (Albert Ayler) – 6:40
3. "Over Time" (Burrell) – 10:28
4. "Perfection" (Ornette Coleman) – 5:40
5. "Chelsea Bridge" (Billy Strayhorn) – 9:05
6. "St. Thomas" (Sonny Rollins) – 9:33

== Personnel ==
- David Murray – tenor saxophone
- Dave Burrell – piano
- Fred Hopkins – bass
- Ralph Peterson Jr. – drums
