= Like a Kiss that Never Ends =

Studio album by David Murray
- Released: 2001
- Recorded: June 5, 2000
- Genre: Jazz
- Length: 61:02
- Label: Justin Time
- Producer: David Murray

David Murray chronology
Octet Plays Trane (2000)	Like a Kiss that Never Ends (2001)	Yonn-Dé (2002)

Like a Kiss that Never Ends is an album by David Murray, released on the Canadian Justin Time label. Recorded in 2000 and released in 2001, the album contains performances by Murray, Andrew Cyrille, John Hicks and Ray Drummond.

== Reception ==
The AllMusic review by Steve Loewy stated: "While Like a Kiss That Never Ends is not pivotal in Murray's distinguished career, it nonetheless retains the high quality that has marked so much of his work." Critic Gary Giddins described "Blues for Felix" as "one of Murray's best pieces in years", and concluded that the album was "all pleasure, no regrets".

Professional ratings
Review scores
Source	Rating
AllMusic	3/5 stars
The Penguin Guide to Jazz Recordings	3/4 stars

== Track listing ==
1. "Blues for Felix" - 7:21
2. "Like a Kiss That Never Ends" - 12:44
3. "Dedication" (Drummond) - 7:14
4. "Suki, Suki Now" - 9:43
5. "Ruben's Theme Song" - 6:30
6. "Mo' Bass" - 7:40
7. "Let's Cool One' (Monk) - 9:50

All compositions by David Murray except as indicated
- Recorded June 5, 2000

== Personnel ==
- David Murray - tenor saxophone, bass clarinet
- Andrew Cyrille - drums
- John Hicks - piano
- Ray Drummond - bass
