= Saxmen =

Studio album by David Murray
- Released: 1993
- Recorded: August 19, 1993
- Genre: Jazz
- Length: 52:43
- Label: Red Baron Records
- Producer: Bob Thiele

David Murray chronology
Acoustic Octfunk (1993)	Saxmen (1993)	For Aunt Louise (1993)

Saxmen is an album by David Murray on the Red Baron label released in 1993. It features performances by Murray, John Hicks, Ray Drummond and Andrew Cyrille.

== Reception ==
The Allmusic review by Scott Yanow awarded the album 2 stars stating "The rhythm section (pianist John Hicks, bassist Ray Drummond and drummer Andrew Cyrille) largely ignores the tenor's improvisations, making this one of David Murray's more forgettable recordings.".

Professional ratings
Review scores
Source	Rating
Allmusic	2/5 stars

== Track listing ==
1. "Lester Leaps In" (Young) 8:25
2. "St. Thomas" (Rollins) - 9:11
3. "Billie's Bounce" (Parker) 8:45
4. "Bright Mississippi" (Monk) - 7:52
5. "Broadway" (Bird, McRae, Woode) - 6:09
6. "Central Park West" (Coltrane) - 12:21

- Recorded August 19, 1993, in NYC

== Personnel ==
- David Murray - tenor saxophone
- John Hicks - piano
- Ray Drummond - bass
- Andrew Cyrille - drums
