= For Aunt Louise =

Studio album by David Murray Quartet
- Released: 1995
- Recorded: September 14–17, 1993; Sound On Sound, NYC
- Genre: Jazz
- Length: 65:25
- Label: DIW; DIW 901
- Producer: Kazunori Sugiyama

David Murray chronology
| Saxmen (1993) | For Aunt Louise (1995) | Love and Sorrow (1993) |

For Aunt Louise is an album by David Murray which was recorded for the Japanese DIW label in 1993 and released in 1995. It features performances by Murray, John Hicks, Fred Hopkins, and Idris Muhammad.

== Reception ==
The Allmusic review by Al Campbell awarded the album 3 stars stating "While Murray still produces exciting flashes of furious free jazz tenor, he reins in his avant garde leanings, playing in an overall melodic yet bluesy style.".

Professional ratings
Review scores
| Source | Rating |
|---|---|
| Allmusic | 3/5 stars |

== Track listing ==
All compositions by David Murray except as indicated

1. "Fantasy Rainbow" - 10:42
2. "Hicks' Time (Hicks) - 10:04
3. "Asiatic Raes" (Dorham) - 7:38
4. "Fishin' and Missin' You - For Aunt Louise" - 8:11
5. "Boogie Real Slow" (Traditional) - 7:44
6. "Autumn of the Patriarch - For Fred Hackett" - 8:55
7. "Concion de Amour en Espanol" (Brian Smith) - 12:11

== Personnel ==
- David Murray - tenor saxophone, bass clarinet
- John Hicks - piano
- Fred Hopkins - bass
- Idris Muhammad - drums
