= Yonn-Dé =

Studio album by David Murray
- Released: 2002
- Recorded: January 10–February 15, 2001
- Genre: Jazz
- Length: 70:19
- Label: Justin Time
- Producer: David Murray

David Murray chronology
Like a Kiss that Never Ends (2003)	Yonn-Dé (2002)	Now Is Another Time (2003)

Yonn-Dé is an album by David Murray, released on the Canadian Justin Time label. Recorded in 2001 and released in 2003 the album features performances by Murray and the Gwo-Ka Masters. It was Murray's first album with the Gwo-Ka Masters and was followed by Gwotet (2005).

== Reception ==
The AllMusic review by David R. Adler stated, "It is Santi Debriano who proves to be the beating heart of the entire project, lending harmonic shape and direction and making every track a unique journey."

Professional ratings
Review scores
Source	Rating
AllMusic	4/5 stars
The Penguin Guide to Jazz Recordings	3/4 stars

== Track listing ==
1. "TWA Jou San Manjé" - 11:21
2. "Youyou" - 11:02
3. "On Jou Maten" - 10:04
4. "Onomatopée (Boula Djèl)" - 4:47
5. "Nwèl 'O!" - 4:40
6. "Yonn-Dé" - 9:56
7. "La Pli La" - 9:28
8. "Moman Colombo" - 9:01

All compositions by Guy Konket
- Recorded January 10-February 15, 2001

== Personnel ==
- David Murray - tenor saxophone, bass clarinet
- Guy Konket - vocal
- Klod Kiavue - gwo ka drums, vocals
- François Landreseau - gwo ka drums, vocals
- Hugh Ragin - trumpet
- Craig Harris - trombone
- Santi Debriano - bass
- Pheeroan AkLaff - drums
