= Creole (album) =

Studio album by David Murray
- Released: 1998
- Recorded: October 19–20, 1997
- Genre: Jazz
- Length: 64:29
- Label: Justin Time
- Producer: Jim West

David Murray chronology
| Fo Deuk Revue (1997) | Creole (1998) | Seasons (2000) |

Creole is an album by David Murray released on the Canadian Justin Time label. Recorded in 1997 and released in 1998 the album features performances by Murray with Michel Cilla, Max Cilla, Ray Drummond, Billy Hart, D.D. Jackson, Klod Kiavue, François Landreseau, Gérard Lockel and James Newton.

== Reception ==
The Allmusic review by Tim Sheridan awarded the album 3 stars stating "Celebrating the Caribbean spirit through bold rhythms and atonal experiment, this disc is for the most part an intriguing effort. While the "noodling" is not for everyone's taste, there are many beautiful moments throughout.".

Professional ratings
Review scores
| Source | Rating |
|---|---|
| Allmusic | 3/5 stars |

== Track listing ==
1. "Gété" (Kavue) - 6:00
2. "Flor Na Paul" (Teofilo Chantre) - 8:40
3. "Guadeloupe Sunrise" (Murray) - 5:50
4. "Soma Tour" (Max Cilla) - 7:26
5. "Savon de Toilette" (Landresau) - 4:53
6. "Gansavan'n" (Kavue) - 9:15
7. "Mona" (Murray) - 9:59
8. "Guadeloupe After Dark" (Lockel) - 4:59
9. "Tonte Vontarde" (Chantre) - 7:27
- Recorded October 19 & 20, 1997 in Martinique

== Personnel ==
- David Murray - tenor saxophone, bass clarinet
- Michel Cilla - dibass drum, voice
- Max Cilla - alto flute des mornes
- Ray Drummond - bass
- Billy Hart - drums
- D. D. Jackson - piano
- Klod Kiavue - ka drum, percussion and voice
- François Landreseau - ka drum and voice (on track 05)
- Gérard Lockel - guitar
- James Newton - flute
