= Children (David Murray album) =

Studio album by David Murray
- Released: 1984
- Recorded: October 27 & November 15, 1984
- Genre: Jazz
- Length: 42:09
- Label: Black Saint
- Producer: David Murray

David Murray chronology
Live at Sweet Basil Volume 2 (1984)	Children (1984)	New Life (1985)

Children is an album by David Murray, released on the Italian Black Saint label in 1984. It features performances by Murray, guitarist James "Blood" Ulmer, keyboardist Don Pullen, bassist Lonnie Plaxico and drummer Marvin "Smitty" Smith.

According to Chris Kelsey, in his Allmusic essay "Free Jazz: A Subjective History", Children is one of the 20 Essential Free Jazz Albums.

== Reception ==
The AllMusic review by Scott Yanow stated, "The somewhat noisy performances are pretty spontaneous and, thanks to Pullen's rhythmic style, a little more accessible than one might expect, despite being quite adventurous."

Professional ratings
Review scores
Source	Rating
AllMusic	4/5 stars
The Penguin Guide to Jazz Recordings	3/4 stars

== Track listing ==
1. "David's Tune" – 11:43
2. "Death" – 7:15
3. "All the Things You Are" (Oscar Hammerstein II, Jerome Kern) – 14:54
4. "Tension" – 8:17

All compositions by David Murray except as indicated

  - Recorded at Vanguard Studios, NYC, October 27 and November 15, 1984

== Personnel ==
- David Murray – tenor saxophone, bass clarinet
- James Blood Ulmer – guitar
- Don Pullen – piano
- Lonnie Plaxico – bass
- Marvin "Smitty" Smith – percussion
