= Paul Schwartz (composer) =

American classical composer

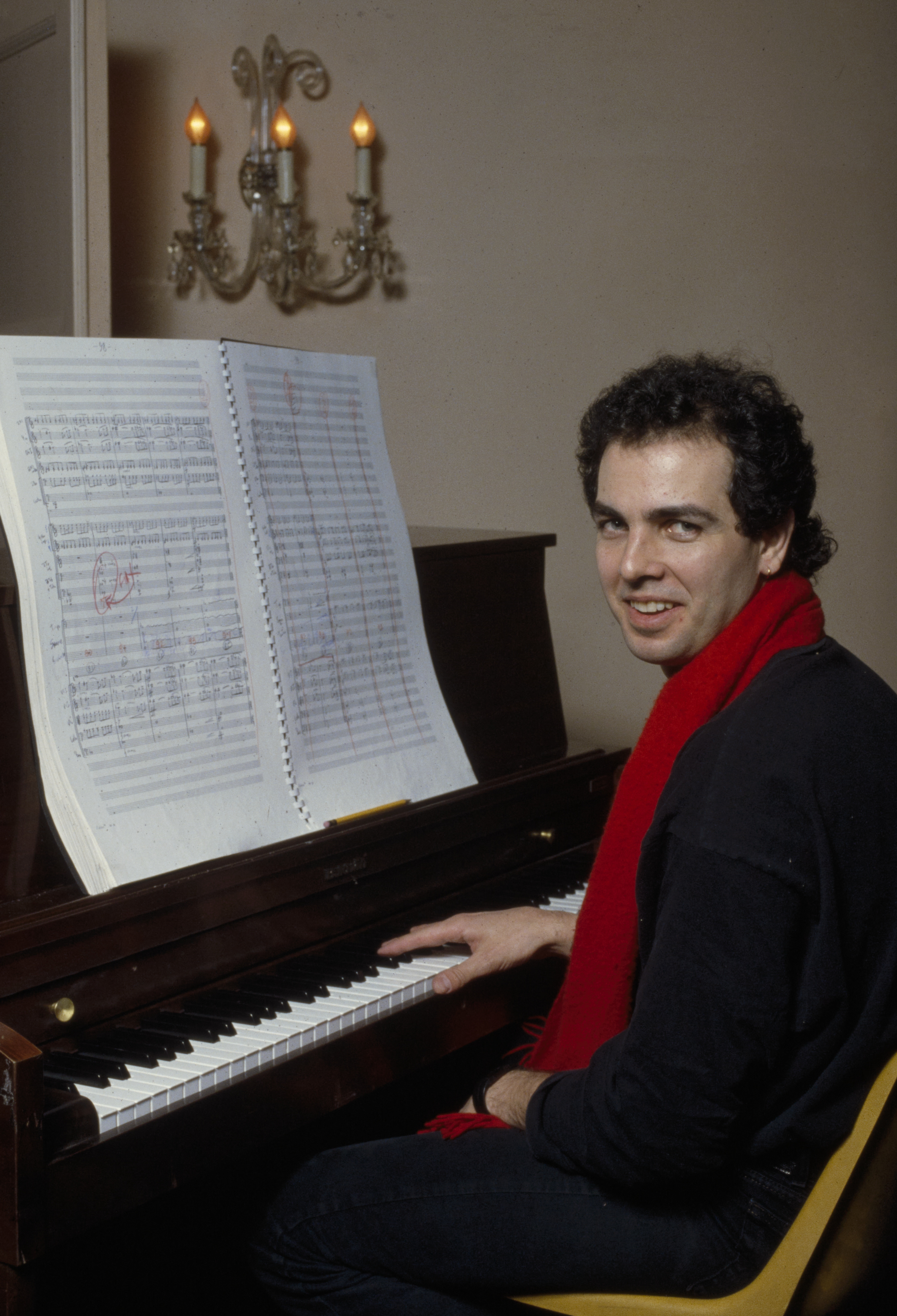
Paul Schwartz in 1988

Paul Schwartz (born 1956) is an American record producer, composer, arranger, conductor, and pianist. the basic elements of which are voice, piano, violin, and electronic samples. He has collaborated with vocalists Lisbeth Scott and Rebecca Luker, performing on many songs.

Schwartz was born in New York City, the son of composer/producer Arthur Schwartz and actress/dancer Mary Schwartz, and he is the half-brother of radio personality/sometime musician Jonathan Schwartz.

Paul studied composition at the Royal College of Music in London. He has conducted the pit orchestras of Broadway shows (such as The Phantom of the Opera). He has worked with André Previn, composed and recorded with Carlos Santana and David Foster, and written for Josh Groban.

== Discography ==
- Aria (Astor Place, 1997)
- Revolution (Astor Place, 1998)
- Aria 2: New Horizon (Astor Place, 1999)
- State of Grace (2000, 2011)
- Earthbound (2002)
- State of Grace II: Turning to Peace (2003)
- Aria 3: Metamorphosis (Astor Place, 2004)
- State of Grace III (2006)
- Glimpses of Sappho (2007)
