= Dark Star: The Music of the Grateful Dead =

Studio album by David Murray Octet
- Released: 1996
- Recorded: January 17–18, 1996
- Genre: Jazz
- Length: 61:05
- Label: Astor Place
- Producer: Herbie Miller

David Murray chronology
Flowers Around Cleveland (1995)	Dark Star: The Music of the Grateful Dead (1996)	Long Goodbye: A Tribute to Don Pullen (1996)

Professional ratings
Review scores
Source	Rating
The Penguin Guide to Jazz Recordings	3.5/4 stars

Dark Star: The Music of the Grateful Dead is an album by the David Murray Octet released on Astor Place.

It was released in 1996 and contains Murray's versions of compositions by the Grateful Dead. Murray was a fan of the Grateful Dead, and joined band and its members as a guest at several live concerts. The Octet plays on the first six tracks, and the last is duo with Murray and Bob Weir of the Grateful Dead on acoustic guitar.

== Track listing ==
1. "Shakedown Street" (Garcia, Hunter) – 8:54
2. "Samson and Delilah" (Traditional) – 11:12
3. "Estimated Prophet" (Barlow, Weir) – 5:55
4. "Dark Star" (Garcia, Hunter, Kreutzmann, Lesh, McKernan, Weir) – 16:15
5. "China Doll" (Garcia, Hunter) – 5:17
6. "One More Saturday Night" (Weir) – 8:29
7. "Shoulda Had Been Me" (Cockburn, Nash, Weir) – 5:06
- Recorded on January 17–18, 1996 at Clinton Recording Studios, New York, NY

== Personnel ==
- David Murray – tenor saxophone, bass clarinet
- Hugh Ragin – trumpet
- James Zoller or Omar Kabir – trumpets
- Craig Harris – trombone
- James Spaulding – alto saxophone, flute
- Robert Irving III – piano, hammond B-3 organ, synthesizer
- Fred Hopkins – bass
- Renzell Meritt – drums
- Bob Weir – guitar (7)
