= David Murray Quintet =

Studio album by David Murray
- Released: 1996
- Recorded: January 2–3, 1994; Clinton Recording Studio, NYC
- Genre: Jazz
- Length: 51:09
- Label: DIW; DIW 908
- Producer: Kazunori Sugiyama

David Murray chronology
Windward Passages (1993)	David Murray Quintet (1996)	The Tip (1994)

David Murray Quintet (subtitled with Ray Anderson & Anthony Davis) is an album by David Murray, recorded in 1994 and released on the Japanese DIW label in 1996. It features performances by Murray, trombonist Ray Anderson, pianist Anthony Davis, bassist Kenny Davis and drummer Tommy Campbell.

== Reception ==
The AllMusic review by Chris Kelsey stated: "This is a first-rate album by as heavy an ad hoc group as you'll find anywhere."

Professional ratings
Review scores
Source	Rating
AllMusic	4.5/5 stars

== Track listing ==
1. "Stompin' at the Savoy" (Sampson, Goodman, Webb) - 7:57
2. "Disguise The Limit" (Anderson) - 6:17
3. "Jaywalking" (Kenny Davis) - 5:42
4. "Andrew" (Anthony Davis) - 10:24
5. "Kiano" (Anthony Davis) - 11:55
6. "Funkalific" (Anderson) - 8:53

== Personnel ==
- David Murray - tenor saxophone, bass clarinet
- Ray Anderson - trombone
- Anthony Davis - piano
- Kenny Davis - bass
- Tommy Campbell - drums
