= Speaking in Tongues (David Murray album) =

Studio album by David Murray
- Released: 1999
- Recorded: December 5, 1997
- Genre: Jazz
- Length: 56:54
- Label: Justin Time
- Producer: David Murray

David Murray chronology
| Seasons (1999) | Speaking in Tongues (1999) | Long Goodbye: A Tribute to Don Pullen (1998) |

Speaking in Tongues is an album by David Murray. It was released on the Canadian Justin Time label. Recorded in 1997 and released in 1999, the album contains performances by Murray with Fontella Bass, Leopoldo F. Fleming, Stanley Franks, Clarence 'Pookie' Jenkins, Ranzell Merritt, Jimane Nelson, and Hugh Ragin.

== Reception ==
The AllMusic review by Heather Phares stated: "Speaking in Tongues features more intuitive, forward-thinking work from this challenging saxophonist and his band." Mother Jones deemed the album "spirituals ... interpreted with a heavy dose of electrified soul."

Professional ratings
Review scores
| Source | Rating |
|---|---|
| AllMusic | 3/5 stars |
| The Penguin Guide to Jazz Recordings | 3.5/4 stars |

== Track listing ==
1. "How I Got Over" (Ward) – 5:39
2. "Nobody Knows the Trouble I've Seen" (Traditional) – 9:33
3. "Jimane's Creation" (Nelson) – 6:29
4. "Missionary" (Murray) – 11:43
5. "Don't Know What I Would Do" (Dorsey-Gregory) – 8:44
6. "Amazing Grace" (Newton) – 5:53
7. "Blessed Assurance" (Crosby-Knapp) – 4:31
8. "A Closer Walk with Thee" (Traditional) – 4:22

- Recorded December 5, 1997

== Personnel ==
- David Murray – tenor saxophone, bass clarinet
- Fontella Bass – vocals
- Leopoldo F. Fleming – percussion
- Stanley Franks – guitar
- Clarence 'Pookie' Jenkins – electric bass
- Ranzell Merritt – drums
- Jimane Nelson – organ, piano, synthesizers
- Hugh Ragin – trumpet
