= New Life (David Murray album) =

Studio album by David Murray Octet
- Released: 1985
- Recorded: October 8, 1985
- Genre: Jazz
- Length: 39:47
- Label: Black Saint
- Producer: David Murray

David Murray Octet chronology
Children (1984)	New Life (1985)	I Want to Talk About You (1986)

New Life is an album by David Murray released on the Italian Black Saint label in 1985 and is a recording of Murray's Octet. It features performances by Murray, Baikida Carroll, Hugh Ragin, Craig Harris, John Purcell, Adegoke Steve Colson, Wilber Morris and Ralph Peterson, Jr.

== Reception ==
The Allmusic review by Scott Yanow awarded the album 4 stars, stating: "The tunes ('Train Whistle,' "'Morning Song,' 'New Life' and 'Blues in the Pocket') are each fairly memorable – the themes are strong than usual – and as usual, the Octet features the right combination of adventurous solos and colorful writing. Recommended."

Professional ratings
Review scores
Source	Rating
Allmusic	4/5 stars

== Track listing ==
1. "Train Whistle" – 11:49
2. "Morning Song" – 10:09
3. "New Life" – 6:35
4. "Blues in the Pocket" – 11:14

All compositions by David Murray
- Recorded at Sorcerer Sound Studio, NYC, October 8, 1985

== Personnel ==
- David Murray – tenor saxophone, bass clarinet
- Baikida Carroll – trumpet
- Hugh Ragin – trumpet
- Craig Harris – trombone
- John Purcell – alto saxophone
- Steve Colson – piano
- Wilber Morris – bass
- Ralph Peterson, Jr. – drums
