= Waltz Again =

Studio album by David Murray Quartet
- Released: 2005
- Recorded: December 2002
- Genre: Jazz
- Length: 63:16
- Label: Justin Time; JUST 193-2
- Producer: Valerie Malot

David Murray Quartet chronology
Gwotet (2004)	Waltz Again (2005)	Sacred Ground (2007)

Waltz Again is an album by David Murray, released on the Canadian Justin Time label. Recorded in 2002 and released in 2005 the album features performances by Murray, Lafayette Gilchrist, Jaribu Shahid, and Hamid Drake along with a 10-person string section.

== Reception ==
The AllMusic review by Alex Henderson stated, "Waltz Again has its share of avant-garde appeal, but some parts of this 63-minute CD are peaceful, tranquil, and downright comforting -- even lush on occasion. And lush is certainly doable when you have ten string players on hand. There are many worthwhile albums in Murray's sizable catalog, and Waltz Again is likely to go down in history as one of his strongest recordings of the 2000s".

Professional ratings
Review scores
Source	Rating
AllMusic	4/5 stars
The Penguin Guide to Jazz Recordings	3.5/4 stars

== Track listing ==
All compositions by David Murray

1. "Pushkin Suite No. 1" - 26:04
2. "Waltz Again" - 8:51
3. "Dark Secrets" - 10:17
4. "Steps" - 11:23
5. "Sparkle" - 6:41
- Recorded December 2002

== Personnel ==
- David Murray - tenor saxophone, bass clarinet
- Lafayette Gilchrist - piano
- Jaribu Shahid - bass
- Hamid Drake - drums
- Unidentified string section
