= Astor Place (label) =

American record label

Astor Place was an American jazz, world music, and electronic music record label.

The label released albums from jazz musicians such as Cedar Walton, David Murray (Dark Star: The Music of the Grateful Dead), Conrad Herwig, and the Ed Palermo Big Band. The label also released world music albums from Alabina, the Paul Schwartz compilation series Café del Mar Aria, and Time and Love: The Music of Laura Nyro.
