= Butch Morris =

American cornetist, composer and conductor

Lawrence Douglas "Butch" Morris
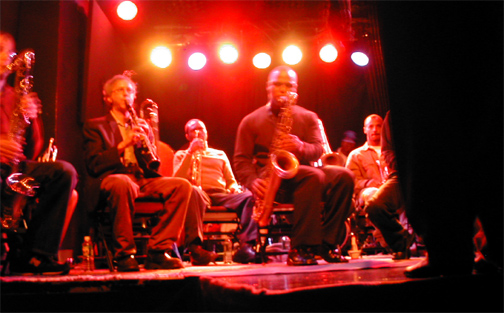
- Butch Morris and Conduction in 2005

Background information
- Born: Lawrence D. Morris; February 10, 1947; Long Beach, California, United States
- Died: January 29, 2013 (aged 65) New York City, New York, United States
- Genres: Jazz; improvisation
- Occupations: Cornetist, composer, conductor
- Instrument: Cornet

Lawrence Douglas "Butch" Morris (February 10, 1947 – January 29, 2013) was an American cornetist, composer and conductor. He was known for pioneering his structural improvisation method, Conduction, which he utilized on many recordings.

== Biography ==
Morris was born in Long Beach, California, United States. Before beginning his musical career, he served in the U.S. Army as a medic in Germany, Japan and Vietnam during the Vietnam War. Morris came to attention with saxophonist David Murray's groups in the late 1970s and early 1980s. Morris's brother, double bassist Wilber Morris, sometimes performed and recorded with Murray during this period. Morris led a group called Orchestra SLANG. The group features Drummer Kenny Wollesen, alto saxophonist Jonathon Haffner, trumpeter Kirk Knuffke and others. He performed and presented regularly as part of the Festival of New Trumpet Music, held annually in New York City. Morris wrote most of the incidental music for the 1989 TV show, A Man Called Hawk, which starred Avery Brooks, with whom he co-wrote the theme music, along with Stanley Clarke. He also played with well-known artist and would-be drummer A.R. Penck in 1990. For AudioBox Matera 1990: International Festival of Sound Experimentation (Pinotto Fava, curator), Morris created Spiriti Materani featuring Wayne Horvitz (keyboards, electronics), J. A. Deane (trombone, electronics), and Butch (cornet). The project took place in Madonna delle Virtù, a 12th-century rupestrian church in Sasso Caveoso, Matera, Italy.

Morris is the originator of Conduction (a term borrowed from physics), a type of structured free improvisation where Morris directs and conducts an improvising ensemble with a series of hand and baton gestures. These conductions have received generally positive reviews, and are often considered quite unique, not quite fitting into any one musical genre. Critic Thom Jurek has written, "There are no records like Butch Morris' conduction sides, nor could there be, though he wishes there were." and Ed Hazell writes, "At his best, Morris can shake players out of their old habits, or place a microscope on one aspect of a musician's artistry and build an orchestral fantasia around it."

Morris died of lung cancer on January 29, 2013, at the age of 65 in a hospital in New York City.

== Discography ==
=== As leader ===
- In Touch But Out Of Reach (Kharma, 1978)
- New York City Artist's Collective: Play Butch Morris (NYCAC, 1984)
- Trios (Dossier, 1986)
- Current Trends in Racism in Modern America (Sound Aspects, 1986)
- Homeing (Sound Aspects, 1988)
- Mass-X-Communication (FMP, 1991)
- Dust To Dust (New World, 1991)
- When the Sun is Out You Don't See Stars (FMP, 1993)
- Testament (New World, 1995)
- Conduction (series) (New World, 1996)
- Burning Cloud (FMP, 1996)
- Berlin Skyscraper (FMP, 1998)
- The Rite (Burnt Sugar, 2003)

=== As sideman ===
With Billy Bang

- Sweet Space (Anima, 1979)
- Outline No. 12 (Celluloid, 1982 [1983])
- Vietnam: The Aftermath (Justin Time, 2001)
- Vietnam: Reflections (Justin Time, 2005)

With Wayne Horvitz

- Some Order, Long Understood (Black Saint, 1982)

With Frank Lowe

- Exotic Heartbreak (Soul Note, 1981)
- Tricks of the Trade (Marge)
- The Other Side (Palm)
- Skizoke
- Live from Soundscape

With Joe Morris

- Graffiti in Two Parts (RogueArt, 2012)

With David Murray

- Vol.1 Penthouse Jazz (1977, Circle)
- Vol.2 Holy Siege on Intrigue (1977, Circle)
- Let the Music Take You (Marge, 1978)
- Last of the Hipman (Red, 1978)
- David Murray Big Band (DIW, 1991)

With Triple Trip Touch (T.T.T.)

- 3+2=XXXX (Dimensional Sound Studio 1, 1983)
