= David Murray (saxophonist) =

American jazz musician (born 1955)

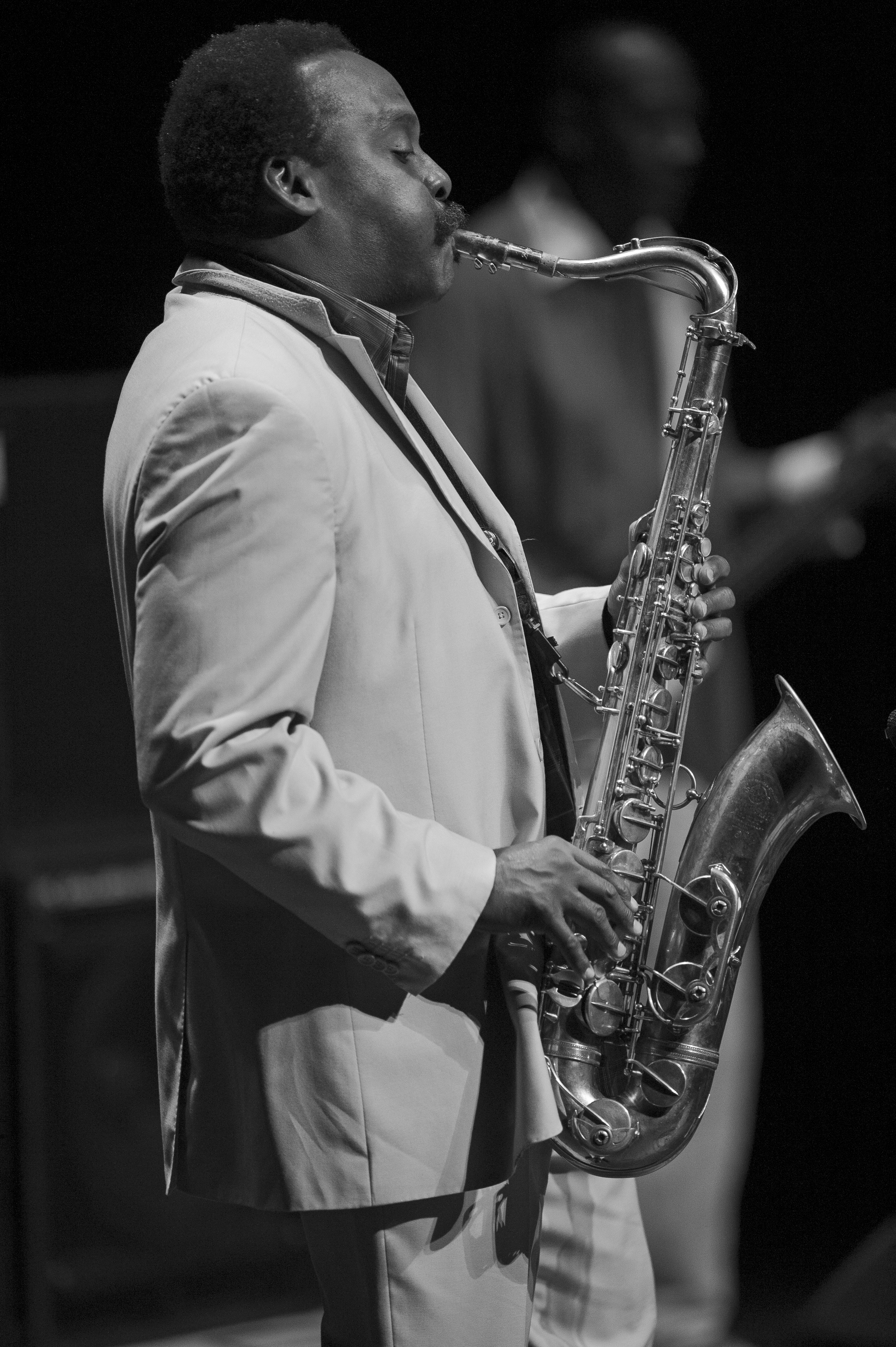
- Murray at the Guelph Jazz Festival in 2009, Canada

Background information
- Born: February 19, 1955 (age 71)
- Origin: Oakland, California, U.S.
- Genres: Contemporary jazz; Post bop
- Instruments: Tenor saxophone; Bass clarinet
- Years active: 1970s–present
- Labels: Motéma Music, Red Baron, Justin Time, Marge, PAO Records, Intakt Records, Black Saint, Columbia Epic, Indian Navigation, Disk Union
- Formerly of: World Saxophone Quartet

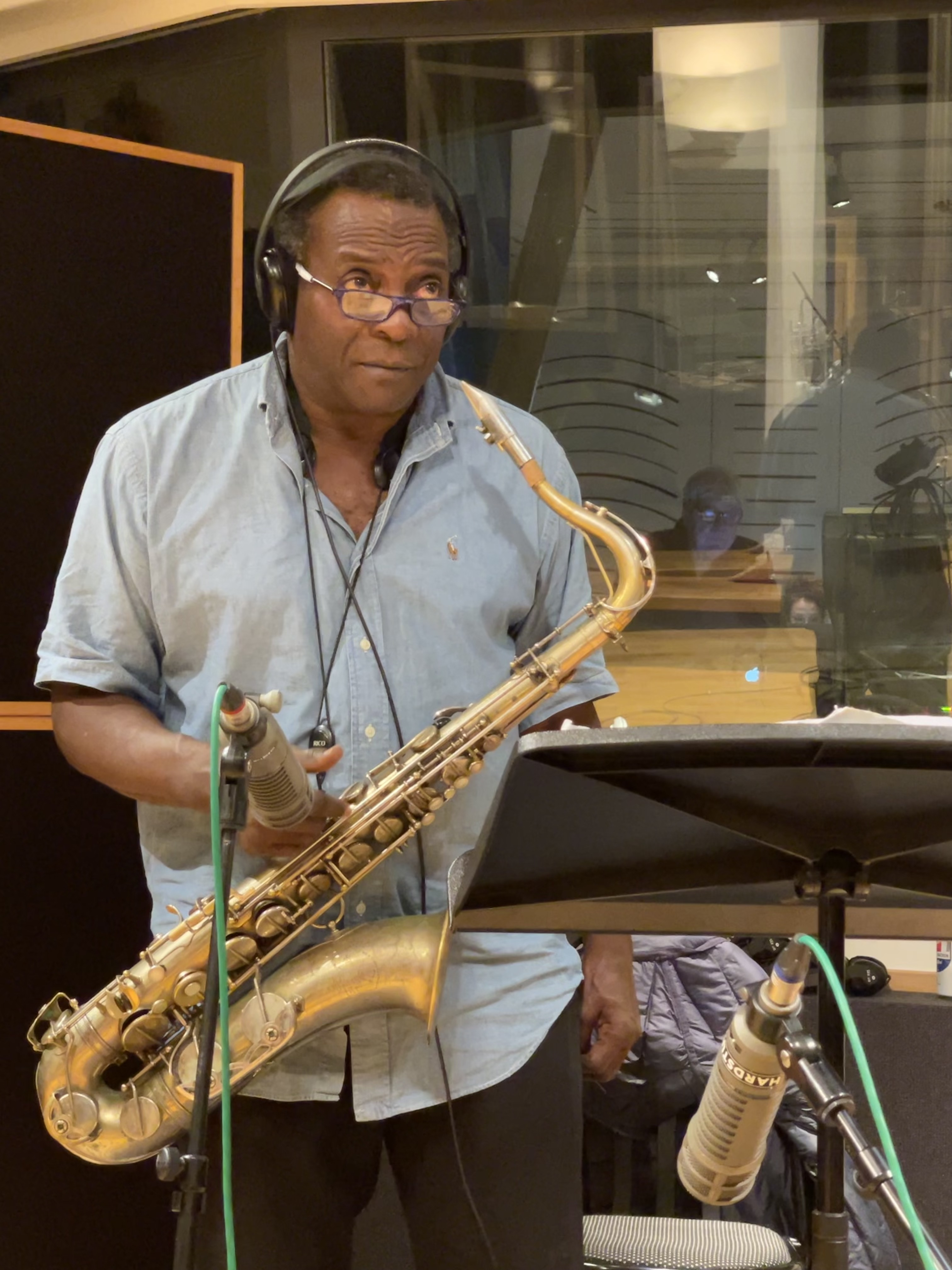
Murray in the studio recording Brave New World Trio's first album Seriana Promethea, November 2021

David Keith Murray (born February 19, 1955) is an American jazz saxophonist and composer who performs mostly on tenor and bass clarinet. He has recorded prolifically for many record labels since the mid-1970s. He lives in New York City.

== Biography ==
Murray was born on February 19, 1955, in Oakland, California, United States. He attended Pomona College for two years as a member of the class of 1977, ultimately receiving an honorary degree in 2012. He was initially influenced by free jazz musicians such as Albert Ayler, Ornette Coleman and Archie Shepp. He gradually evolved a more diverse style in his playing and compositions. Murray set himself apart from most tenor players of his generation by not taking John Coltrane as his model, choosing instead to incorporate elements of mainstream players Coleman Hawkins, Ben Webster and Paul Gonsalves into his mature style. Despite this, he recorded a tribute to Coltrane, Octet Plays Trane, in 1999.

Murray was a founding member of the World Saxophone Quartet with Oliver Lake, Julius Hemphill and Hamiet Bluiett. He has recorded or performed with musicians such as Henry Threadgill, James Blood Ulmer, Olu Dara, Tani Tabbal, Butch Morris, Donal Fox, McCoy Tyner, Elvin Jones, Sunny Murray (no relation), Ed Blackwell, Johnny Dyani, Fred Hopkins, Don Pullen, Randy Weston, Steve McCall and the Grateful Dead. David Murray's use of circular breathing has enabled him to play astonishingly long phrases.

In 2024, Murray released an album with his new quartet: Francesca, with Marta Sanchez (piano), Luke Stewart (bass) and Russell Carter (drums). His wife Francesca Cinelli Murray produced and directed a video animation for the title "Ninno", in collaboration with painter and animator Nancy Ostrovsky.

Francesca was selected #2 2024 Best Jazz Album of the Year by The New York Times and among the best jazz albums of the year by Downbeat.

David Murray's next quartet album, Birdly Serenade, was released in spring 2025 on Impulse! Records.

== Awards ==
- In 1980, David Murray was named Village Voice Musician of the Decade.
- Murray was honored with the Bird Award in 1986.
- He was awarded a Guggenheim Fellowship in 1989.
- David Murray and his band earned a Grammy Award in 1989 in the Best Jazz Instrumental Group Performance category for Blues for Coltrane: A Tribute to John Coltrane.
- In 1991, he was honored with the Danish Jazzpar Prize.
- Newsday named him Musician of the Year in 1993.
- He was the recipient of an honorary doctorate in music from Pomona College in 2012.
- He was awarded a legacy grant by the California Arts Council in 2021.
