= 1970s in jazz =

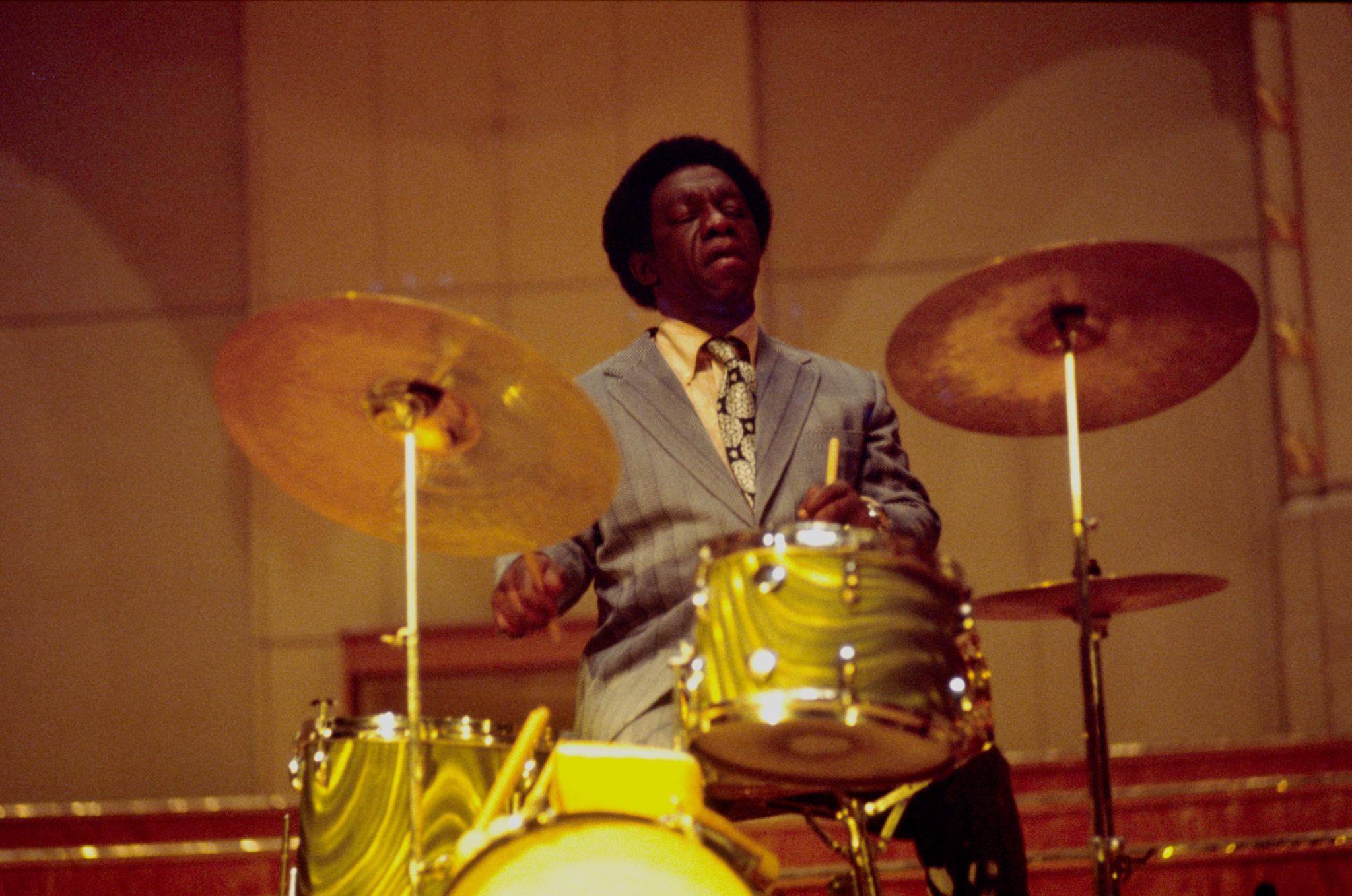
Art Blakey, 1973

In the 1970s, jazz became increasingly influenced by Latin jazz, combining rhythms from African and Latin American countries, often played on instruments such as conga, timbale, güiro, and claves, with jazz and classical harmonies played on typical jazz instruments (piano, double bass, etc.). Artists such as Chick Corea, John McLaughlin, and Al Di Meola increasingly influenced the genre with jazz fusion, a hybrid form of jazz-rock fusion which was developed by combining jazz improvisation with rock rhythms, electric instruments, and the highly amplified stage sound of rock musicians such as Jimi Hendrix. All Music Guide states that "..until around 1967, the worlds of jazz and rock were nearly completely separate." However, "...as rock became more creative and its musicianship improved, and as some in the jazz world became bored with hard bop and did not want to play strictly avant-garde music, the two different idioms began to trade ideas and occasionally combine forces." On June 16, 1972, the New York Jazz Museum opened in New York City at 125 West 55th Street in a one-and-a-half-story building. It became the most important institution for jazz in the world with a 25,000-item archive, free concerts, exhibits, film programs, etc.

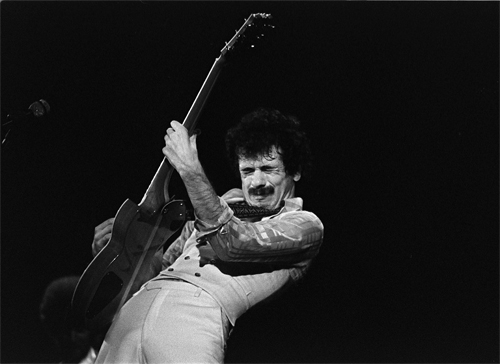
Carlos Santana, one of the pioneers of the Latin jazz-fusion genre

Miles Davis made the breakthrough into fusion in the 1970s with his album Bitches Brew. Musicians who worked with Davis formed the four most influential fusion groups: Weather Report and Mahavishnu Orchestra emerged in 1971 and were soon followed by Return to Forever and The Headhunters. Although jazz purists protested the blend of jazz and rock, some of jazz's significant innovators crossed over from the contemporary hard bop scene into fusion. Jazz fusion music often uses mixed meters, odd time signatures, syncopation, and complex chords and harmonies. In addition to using the electric instruments of rock, such as the electric guitar, electric bass, electric piano, and synthesizer keyboards, fusion also used the powerful amplification, "fuzz" pedals, wah-wah pedals, and other effects used by 1970s-era rock bands. Notable performers of jazz fusion included Miles Davis, keyboardists Joe Zawinul, Chick Corea, Herbie Hancock, vibraphonist Gary Burton, drummer Tony Williams, violinist Jean-Luc Ponty, guitarists Larry Coryell, Al Di Meola, John McLaughlin and Frank Zappa, saxophonist Wayne Shorter, and bassists Jaco Pastorius and Stanley Clarke. Jazz fusion was also popular in Japan where the band Casiopea released over thirty albums praising Jazz Fusion.

In the mid-1970s, jazz funk became popular, characterized by a strong back beat (groove), electrified sounds, and often, the presence of the first electronic analog synthesizers. The integration of funk, soul, and R&B music and styles into jazz resulted in the creation of a genre whose spectrum is indeed quite wide and ranges from strong jazz improvisation to soul, funk or disco with jazz arrangements, jazz riffs, and jazz solos, and sometimes soul vocals.

Reader's Digest measured the most popular forms of jazz from 1910 to the 1970s, and the 1970 to 1975 part of the chart listed modern jazz or bebop as the most popular subgenre, blues as the second-most popular form, ragtime revival and other traditional forms as the third-most, free jazz as fourth-most, jazz rock as the fifth-most popular, and big band as the least popular.

== 1970s jazz standards ==
- 1971 – "Spain". Jazz fusion composition by Chick Corea. First recorded on Return to Forever's Light as a Feather. The famous theme from the second movement of Joaquín Rodrigo's Concierto de Aranjuez is often used as an introduction for the song.
- 1972 – "Little Sunflower". Composed by Freddie Hubbard with lyrics by Al Jarreau.
- 1972 – "Red Clay". Jazz fusion composition by Freddie Hubbard.
- 1972 – "Waters of March" – 1972 bossa nova song by Antonio Carlos Jobim. Known in Portuguese as "Águas de Março".
- 1973 – "Chameleon". Jazz-funk composition by Herbie Hancock, Paul Jackson, Harvey Mason and Bennie Maupin, from Hancock's album Head Hunters.
- 1973 – "Mr. Magic". Written by Ralph MacDonald and William Salter.
- 1973 – "Send in the Clowns". Song by Stephen Sondheim from the musical A Little Night Music.
- 1974 – "Beauty and the Beast". Jazz fusion composition by Wayne Shorter, from the album Native Dancer.
- 1977 – "Birdland". Jazz fusion composition by Joe Zawinul. Originally released on Heavy Weather by Weather Report, it is instantly recognizable by bassist Jaco Pastorius' introduction using artificial harmonics, and notes sung by him by the end of the song. The tune was one of the biggest hits of the jazz fusion movement.

== 1970 ==
=== Events ===
- July: Lee Morgan records Live at the Lighthouse at the Lighthouse Café in Hermosa Beach, California

=== Album releases ===
- Paul Bley: Improvisie
- Miles Davis: Bitches Brew
- Marion Brown: Afternoon of a Georgia Faun
- Alice Coltrane: Ptah, the El Daoud
- McCoy Tyner: Extensions
- Art Ensemble of Chicago: Les Stances a Sophie
- Sonny Sharrock: Monkey-Pockie-Boo
- Freddie Hubbard: Straight Life
- Art Ensemble of Chicago: Art Ensemble of Chicago with Fontella Bass
- Pharoah Sanders: Deaf Dumb Blind (Summun Bukmun Umyun)
- Jan Garbarek: Afric Pepperbird
- Evan Parker: The Topography of the Lungs
- Herbie Hancock: Mwandishi
- Spontaneous Music Ensemble: So What Do You Think
- Alice Coltrane: Journey in Satchidananda
- Stanley Turrentine: Sugar
- Woody Shaw: Blackstone Legacy
- Freddie Hubbard: Red Clay
- McCoy Tyner: Asante
- Leon Thomas: The Leon Thomas Album
- Hubert Laws: Afro-Classic
- John McLaughlin: My Goal's Beyond
- ICP Orchestra: Groupcomposing
- Guenter Hampel: People Symphony
- Keith Tippett: Dedicated To You But You Weren't Listening
- Misha Mengelberg: Instant Composers Pool 005
- Guenter Hampel: Ballet-Symphony
- Chris McGregor: Chris McGregor's Brotherhood of Breath
- Joe McPhee: Nation Time

=== Deaths ===
- Johnny Hodges (July 25, 1906 – May 11)
- Booker Ervin (October 31, 1930 – July 31)
- Albert Ayler (July 13, 1936 – November 25)

=== Births ===
- Harald Johnsen (March 21), Norwegian upright-bassist
- Simone (August 21), Norwegian singer
- Tord Gustavsen (October 5), Norwegian pianist
- Maria Kannegaard (October 6), Norwegian pianist

== 1971 ==
=== Album releases ===
- Carla Bley: Escalator Over The Hill
- Charles Mingus: Let My Children Hear Music
- Paul Bley: Dual Unity
- Art Ensemble of Chicago: Phase One (1971)
- Mahavishnu Orchestra: The Inner Mounting Flame
- Weather Report: Weather Report
- Jean-Luc Ponty: Open Strings
- Pharoah Sanders: Black Unity
- Lol Coxhill: Ear of the Beholder
- Keith Jarrett: Facing You
- Mike Westbrook: Metropolis
- Willem Breuker: Instant Composers Pool 008
- Jan Garbarek: Sart
- Chick Corea: The Gathering
- Keith Tippett: Septober Energy
- George Russell: Listen to the Silence
- Ornette Coleman: Science Fiction
- Spontaneous Music Ensemble: So What Do You Think
- Derek Bailey: Solo Guitar
- Freddie Hubbard: First Light
- Keith Jarrett: Expectations
- Chick Corea: Piano Improvisations Vol. 1 and Vol. 2
- Joe Zawinul: Zawinul
- Joe McPhee: Trinity
- Oliver Nelson: Swiss Suite
- Terje Rypdal: Terje Rypdal
- Alice Coltrane: Universal Consciousness
- Paul Winter: Icarus
- Alice Coltrane: World Galaxy
- Paul Winter: Road
- Donald Byrd: Ethiopian Knights
- Tim Weisberg: Tim Weisberg
- Don Ellis: Tears of Joy

=== Deaths ===
- Louis Armstrong (August 4, 1901 - July 6), singer and trumpeter
- Charlie Shavers (August 3, 1920 – July 8), trumpet player
- Wynton Kelly (December 2, 1931 — April 12), pianist

=== Births ===
- Stian Carstensen (January 5), Norwegian accordionist and multi-instrumentalist
- Øyvind Brandtsegg (February 16), Norwegian percussionist
- Kristin Asbjørnsen (May 12), Norwegian singer
- Erland Dahlen (May 15), Norwegian drummer
- Håvard Fossum (June 7), Norwegian saxophonist
- Ingebrigt Håker Flaten (September 23), Norwegian upright-bassist
- Helén Eriksen (October 19), Norwegian singer and saxophonist
- Frode Berg (October 24), Norwegian upright-bassist

== 1972 ==
=== Events ===
- Grant Green records Live at the Lighthouse at the Lighthouse Café in Hermosa Beach, California

=== Album releases ===
- Anthony Braxton: Saxophone Improvisations Series F
- Dave Holland: Conference of the Birds
- McCoy Tyner: Sahara
- London Jazz Composers Orchestra: Ode
- Weather Report: I Sing the Body Electric
- Jean-Luc Ponty: Sonata Erotica
- Herbie Hancock: Crossings
- John Surman: Westering Home
- Chick Corea: Light as a Feather
- Guenter Hampel: Familie
- Chick Corea: Return to Forever
- Paul Motian: Conception Vessel
- Neil Ardley: Symphony of Amaranths
- David Liebman: Open Sky
- Ornette Coleman: Skies of America
- Gato Barbieri: Bolivia
- Eric Kloss: One, Two, Free
- Gary Burton: Crystal Silence
- Guenter Hampel: Angel
- Albert Mangelsdorff: Trombirds
- Julius Hemphill: Dogon AD
- Randy Weston: Tanjah
- Guenter Hampel: Waltz For 11 Universes In A Corridor
- Joe Henderson: Black Is the Color
- Guenter Hampel: Broadway
- Nucleus: Belladonna
- Miles Davis: On The Corner
- Oregon: Music Of Another Present Era
- Paul Bley: Open, to Love
- George Russell: Living Time
- McCoy Tyner: Echoes of a Friend
- Mahavishnu Orchestra: Birds of Fire
- Stanley Cowell: Illusion Suite
- Stanley Clarke: Children of Forever
- Gary Bartz: Juju Street Songs
- Airto Moreira: Free

=== Deaths ===
- Lee Morgan (July 10, 1938 – February 19)
- Jimmy Rushing (August 26, 1901 - June 8)
- Kenny Dorham (August 30, 1924 - December 5)

=== Births ===
- Siri Gjære (February 1), Norwegian singer
- Christer Fredriksen (April 15), Norwegian guitarist
- Ketil Gutvik (July 4), Norwegian guitarist
- Roger Johansen (July 29), Norwegian drummer

== 1973 ==
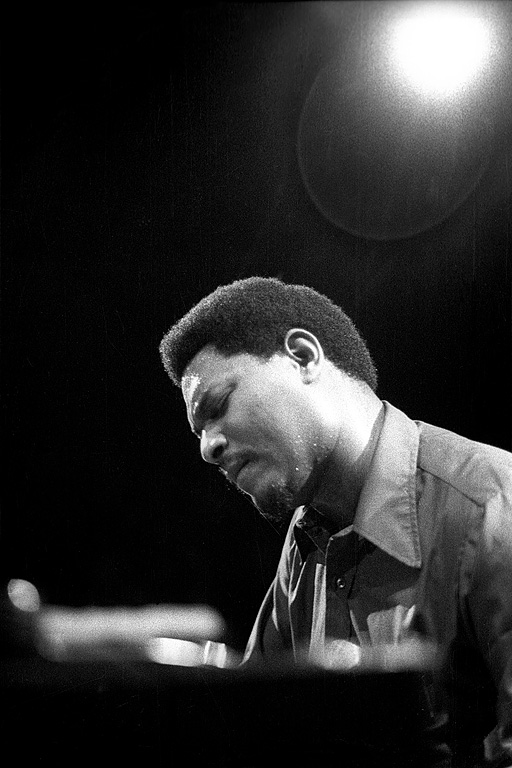
McCoy Tyner in 1973

=== Album releases ===
- Sam Rivers: Streams
- Roland Kirk: Prepare Thyself To Deal With A Miracle
- Dollar Brand: Sangoma
- Art Ensemble of Chicago: Fanfare For The Warriors
- Don Cherry: Relativity Suite
- Cecil Taylor: Spring of Two Blue J's
- Keith Jarrett: Solo Concerts
- McCoy Tyner: Enlightenment
- Carla Bley: Tropic Appetites
- Dollar Brand: African Space Program
- Marion Brown: Geechee Recollections
- Herbie Hancock: Sextant
- Frank Wright: Church Number Nine
- Gato Barbieri: Latin America
- Frank Lowe: Black Beings
- Ralph Towner: Diary
- Dewey Redman: The Ear of the Behearer
- Eberhard Weber: The Colours of Chloë
- Roswell Rudd: Numatik Swing Band
- Oregon: Distant Hills
- Dollar Brand: African Portraits
- Weather Report: Sweetnighter
- David Liebman: Lookout Farm
- Oscar Peterson: The Trio
- Cecil Taylor: Solo
- John Surman: Morning Glory
- Betty Carter: Album
- Mal Waldron: Up Popped the Devil
- Michael Mantler: No Answer
- Billy Cobham: Spectrum
- Herbie Hancock: Head Hunters
- Spontaneous Music Ensemble: Mouthpiece
- Charles Earland: Leaving This Planet
- Flora Purim: Butterfly Dreams
- Herbie Hancock: Thrust
- Billy Cobham: Crosswinds

=== Deaths ===
- Kid Ory (December 25, 1886 – January 23)
- Spanky DeBrest (April 24, 1937 – March 2)
- Willie "The Lion" Smith (November 23, 1893 – April 18)
- Eddie Condon (November 16, 1905 – August 4)
- Bill Harris (October 28, 1916 - August 21)
- Ben Webster (March 27, 1909 – September 20)
- Gene Krupa (January 15, 1909 – October 16)

=== Births ===
- Børre Dalhaug (April 29), Norwegian drummer
- Torbjørn Sletta Jacobsen (August 11), Norwegian saxophonist
- Wetle Holte (September 4), Norwegian drummer
- Thomas T. Dahl (September 7), Norwegian guitarist
- Eirik Hegdal (October 3), Norwegian saxophonist and band leader
- Christian Jaksjø (December 18), Norwegian trombonist

== 1974 ==
=== Album releases ===
- Keith Jarrett: Belonging (ECM)
- Sam Rivers: Crystals
- Cecil Taylor: Silent Tongues
- Steve Lacy: Saxophone Special
- Jeanne Lee: Conspiracy
- Leo Smith: Reflectativity
- Weather Report: Mysterious Traveller
- Randy Weston: Blues To Africa
- Marion Brown: Sweet Earth Flying
- Paul Rutherford: The Gentle Harm of the Bourgeoisie
- Marvin Peterson: Children of the Fire
- John Abercrombie: Timeless
- Roswell Rudd: Flexible Flyer
- McCoy Tyner: Atlantis
- Globe Unity Orchestra: Hamburg '74
- Cecil McBee: Mutima
- Mahavishnu Orchestra: Apocalypse
- Ralph Towner: Solstice
- Terje Rypdal: Whenever I Seem to Be Far Away
- Roscoe Mitchell: Solo Saxophone Concerts
- Steve Kuhn: Ecstasy
- Joe McPhee: Pieces of Light
- Keith Jarrett: Death and the Flower
- Steve Kuhn: Trance
- Steve Lacy: Scraps
- David Liebman: Drum Ode
- Kenny Barron: Peruvian Blue
- Tete Montoliu: Music for Perla
- Bill Watrous: Manhattan Wildlife Refuge
- Lonnie Liston Smith: Expansions
- Mike Gibbs: Only Chrome Waterfall
- McCoy Tyner: Sama Layuca
- Oregon: Winter Light
- Billy Cobham: Total Eclipse

=== Deaths ===
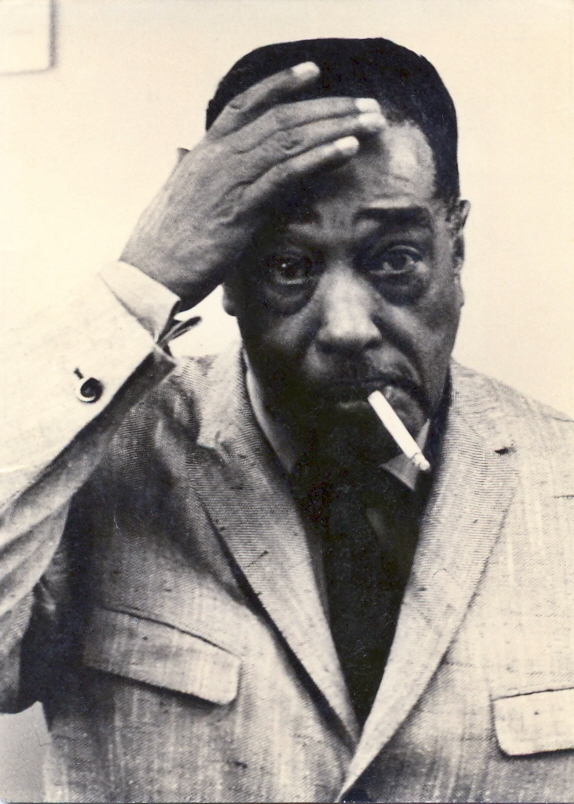
Duke Ellington died on May 24

- Bobby Timmons (December 19, 1935 - March 1)
- Paul Gonsalves (July 12, 1920 - May 15)
- Duke Ellington (April 29, 1899 – May 24)
- Gene Ammons (April 14, 1925 – August 6)
- Tina Brooks (June 7, 1932 – August 13)
- Harry Carney (April 1, 1910 - October 8)

=== Births ===
- Kenneth Ekornes (July 7), Norwegian percussionist
- Line Horntveth (November 26), Norwegian tubist
- Anders Aarum (December 17), Norwegian pianist
- Knut Aalefjær (December 21), Norwegian drummer

== 1975 ==
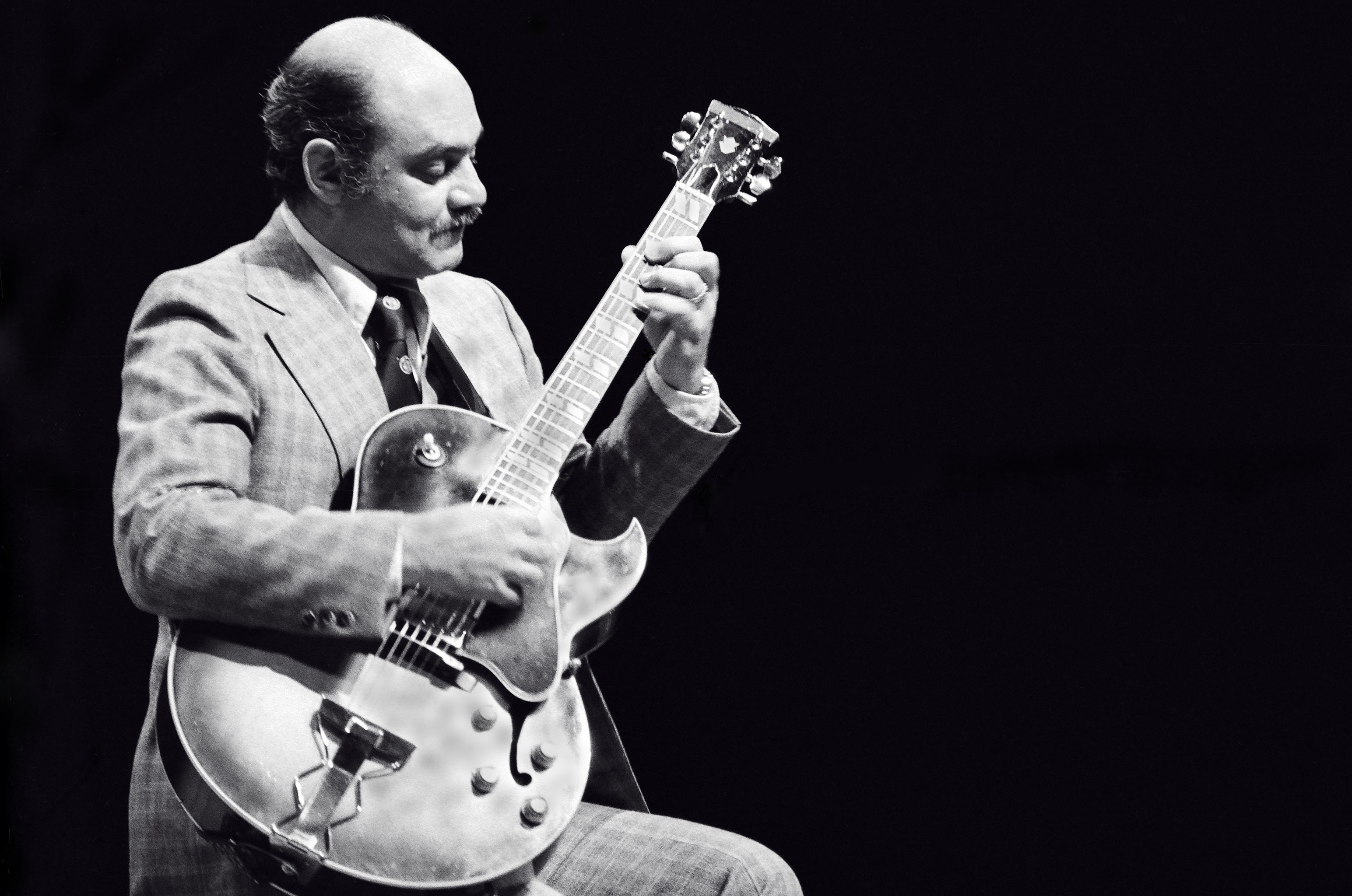
Joe Pass, 1975

=== Album releases ===
- Keith Jarrett: The Köln Concert
- Revolutionary Ensemble: The People's Republic
- Miles Davis: Agharta
- Evan Parker: Saxophone Solos
- Leroy Jenkins: For Players Only
- Air: Air Song
- Oliver Lake: Heavy Spirits
- Kenny Wheeler: Gnu High
- Om: Kirikuki
- Terje Rypdal: Odyssey
- Steve Lacy: Dreams
- Pat Metheny: Bright Size Life
- Anthony Braxton: Five Pieces 1975
- Don Pullen: Solo Piano Album
- Dexter Gordon: Bouncing' with Dex
- Michael Mantler: Michael Mantler - Carla Bley
- Sonny Sharrock: Paradise
- Dudu Pukwana: Diamond Express
- Kenny Barron: Lucifer
- Frank Lowe: The Flam
- John Surman: S.O.S.
- Don Pullen: Healing Force
- Miles Davis: Get Up With It
- Julius Hemphill: Coon Bid'ness
- Gateway Trio: Gateway
- Collin Walcott: Cloud Dance
- Don Moye: Sun Percussion
- Martial Solal: Nothing But Piano
- Eberhard Weber: Yellow Fields
- Don Pullen: Five to Go
- Charles Tolliver: Impact
- Lol Coxhill: Welfare State
- David Liebman: Forgotten Fantasies
- Joe McPhee: The Willisau Concert
- Yosuke Yamashita: Chiasma
- Michael Mantler: The Hapless Child
- Dollar Brand: Soweto
- Don Pullen: Capricorn Rising
- Stanley Clarke: Journey to Love
- Enrico Rava: The Pilgrim and the Stars
- Manhattan Transfer: Manhattan Transfer

=== Deaths ===
- Zutty Singleton (May 14, 1898 -July 14)
- Cannonball Adderley (September 15, 1928 – August 8)
- Oliver Nelson (June 4, 1932 – October 28)

=== Births ===
- Mats Eilertsen (March 4), Norwegian upright-bassist
- Lars Andreas Haug (April 12), Norwegian tubist
- Gunhild Carling (May 7), Swedish multi-instrumentalist
- Frode Haltli (May 15), Norwegian accordionist
- Erik Johannessen (July 22), Norwegian trombonist
- Håkon Mjåset Johansen (August 1), Norwegian drummer
- Espen Aalberg (October 12), Norwegian drummer

== 1976 ==
=== Album releases ===
- Keith Jarrett: The Survivors' Suite
- George E. Lewis: Solo Trombone Record
- Miles Davis: Pangaea
- Air: Air Raid
- David Murray: Flowers for Albert
- Derek Bailey: Company 1
- Jan Garbarek: Dis
- Irene Schweizer: Wilde Señoritas
- Toshiko Akiyoshi: Road Time
- Albert Mangelsdorff: Tromboneliness
- Leo Smith: Song of Humanity
- Tony Coe: Zeitgeist
- Ornette Coleman: Dancing in Your Head
- Jaco Pastorius: Jaco Pastorius
- Martial Solal: Movability
- Hamiet Bluiett: Endangered Species
- Art Lande: Rubisa Patrol
- Chick Corea: Romantic Warrior
- George Adams: Suite for Swingers
- Jean-Luc Ponty: Imaginary Voyage
- David Friesen: Star Dance
- Dexter Gordon: Biting the Apple
- Joachim Kuhn: Springfever
- Eberhard Weber: The Following Morning
- Lew Tabackin: Dual Nature
- Chico Freeman: Morning Prayer
- Weather Report: Black Market
- Charles Tyler: Saga of the Outlaws
- Al Di Meola: Land of the Midnight Sun
- Woody Shaw: Little Red's Fantasy
- Stanley Clarke: School Days
- Yosuke Yamashita: Banslikana
- Ran Blake: Wende
- Guenter Christmann: Solomusiken Fuer Posaune und Kontrabasse
- Egberto Gismondi: Danca Das Cabecas
- Lenny White: Venusian Summer

=== Deaths ===
- Ray Nance (December 10, 1913 - January 28)

=== Births ===
- Erlend Jentoft (March 16), Norwegian saxophonist
- Roger Arntzen (June 3), Norwegian upright-bassist
- Jarle Bernhoft (June 21), Norwegian singer and multiinstrumentalist
- Ivar Grydeland (October 1), Norwegian guitarist
- Jostein Gulbrandsen (October 19), Norwegian guitarist

== 1977 ==
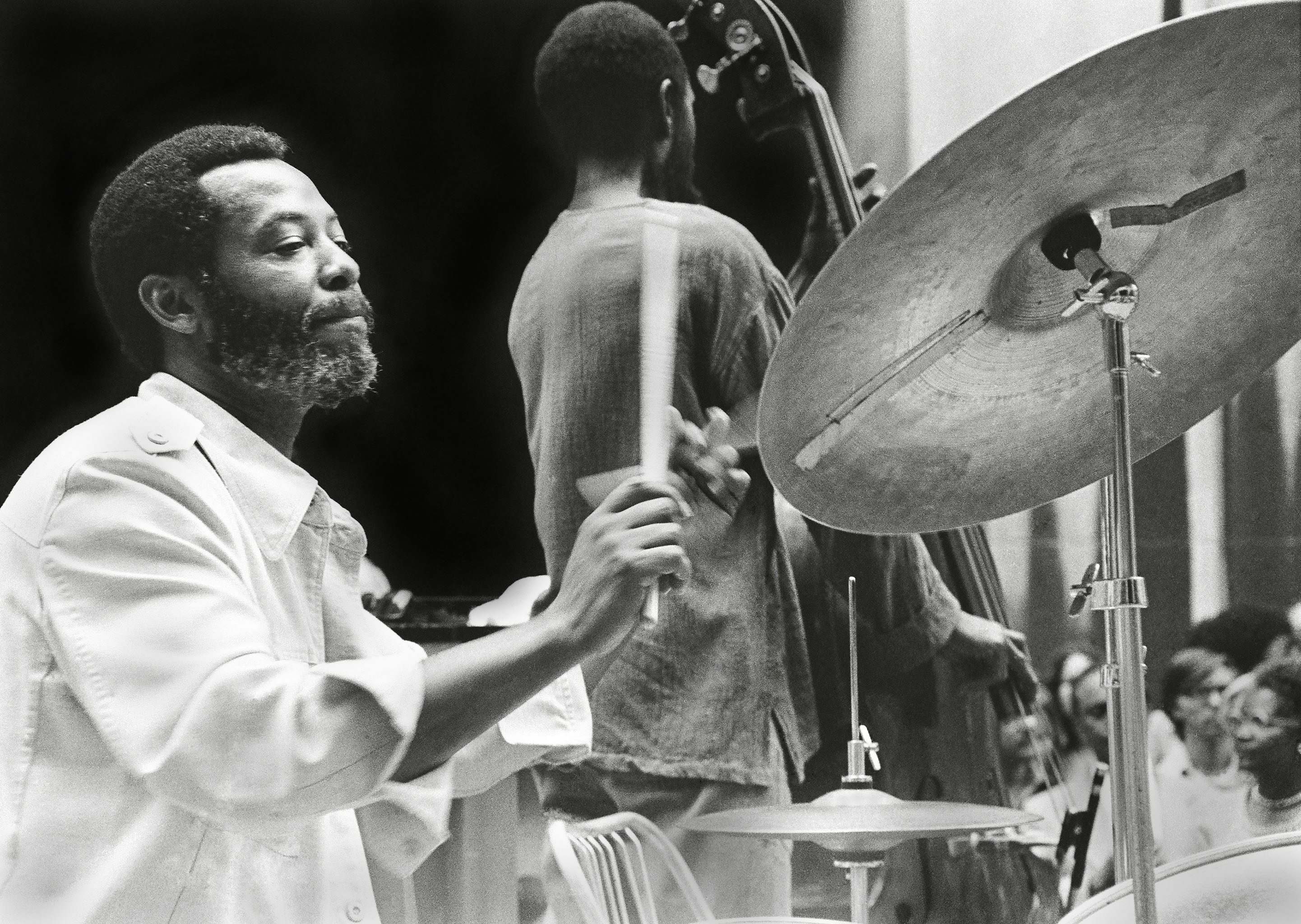
Ben Riley Heath Brothers, 1977

=== Album releases ===
- George E. Lewis: Chicago Slow Dance
- Air: Air Time
- George E. Lewis: Shadowgraph
- Joe McPhee: Graphics
- James Ulmer: Revealing
- Pat Metheny: Watercolors
- John Scofield: East Meets West
- Leroy Jenkins: Solo Concert
- Julius Hemphill: Blue Boyé
- Michael Mantler: Movies
- Abdul Wadud: By Myself
- Roscoe Mitchell: Nonaah
- Joanne Brackeen: Tring A Ling
- Art Lande: Desert Marauders
- Chico Freeman: Kings of Mali
- Art Pepper: No Limit
- Arthur Blythe: Metamorphosis
- Collin Walcott: Grazing Dreams
- David Friesen: Waterfall Rainbow
- Dave Holland: Emerald Tears
- Neil Ardley: Kaleidoscope of Rainbows
- Chico Freeman: Chico
- Frank Lowe: Lowe and Behold
- Vinny Golia: Spirits In Fellowship
- Weather Report: Heavy Weather
- Ernie Krivda: Satanic
- Derek Bailey: Company 5
- Chico Freeman: No Time Left
- Paul Motian: Dance
- Hamiet Bluiett: SOS
- Jan Garbarek: Places
- World Saxophone Quartet: Point Of No Return
- John Tchicai: Real
- Julius Hemphill: Raw Materials and Residuals
- George Russell: Vertical Form 6
- Joanne Brackeen: Aft
- Julius Hemphill: Roi Boyé & the Gotham Minstrels
- Kenny Wheeler: Deer Wan
- Irene Schweizer: Hexensabbat
- Leroy Jenkins: Lifelong Ambitions
- Globe Unity: Pearls
- Ralph Towner: Sound and Shadows
- Hamiet Bluiett: Birthright
- Jean-Luc Ponty: Enigmatic Ocean
- Muhal Richard Abrams: 1-OQA+19
- Cecil McBee: Music From the Source
- Steve Lacy: Raps
- Woody Shaw: Rosewood
- Gateway Trio: 2
- Louis Hayes: The Real Thing
- McCoy Tyner: Supertrios
- Al Di Meola: Elegant Gypsy
- Michael Urbaniak: Urbaniak
- Keith Jarrett: My Song
- Arthur Blythe: Bush Baby
- Sheila Jordan: Sheila

=== Deaths ===
- Erroll Garner (June 15, 1921 – January 2), pianist and composer
- Bennie Green (April 16, 1923 – March 23, 1977)
- Paul Desmond (November 25, 1924 – May 30)
- Rahsaan Roland Kirk (August 7, 1935 – December 5)

=== Births ===
- Torun Eriksen (January 8), Norwegian singer
- Kirsti Huke (March 6), Norwegian singer
- Mads Berven (May 23), Norwegian guitarist
- Frøy Aagre (June 8), Norwegian saxophonist
- Martin Horntveth (September 20), Norwegian drummer
- Tore Johansen (December 23), Norwegian trumpeter

== 1978 ==
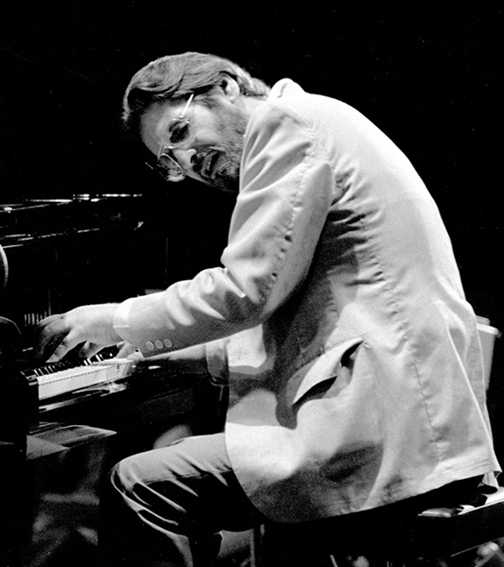
Bill Evans, Montreaux Jazz Festival, 1978

=== Album releases ===
- Leo Smith: The Mass on the World
- Roscoe Mitchell: L-R-G / The Maze / S II Examples
- Leroy Jenkins: The Legend of Ai Glatson
- Rova Saxophone Quartet: Cinema Rovate
- Gerry Hemingway: Kwambe
- Sam Rivers: Waves
- George E. Lewis: Imaginary Suite
- Don Pullen: Warriors
- Guenter Hampel: Oasis
- Cecil Taylor: 3 Phasis
- John Oswald: Improvised
- Andrew Cyrille: Metamusicians' Stomp
- Ralph Towner: Batik
- Art Ensemble of Chicago: Nice Guys
- Carla Bley: Musique Mecanique
- Air: Open Air Suit
- Marvin Peterson: The Light
- Anthony Davis: Of Blues and Dreams
- David Liebman: Pendulum
- Pat Metheny: Pat Metheny Group
- Ernie Krivda: The Alchemist
- Evan Parker: Monoceros
- Anthony Braxton: For Four Orchestras
- Ganelin Trio: Concerto Grosso
- Cecil Taylor: Cecil Taylor Unit
- James Ulmer: Tales of Captain Black
- Oliver Lake: Life Dance Of Is
- Lester Bowie: African Children
- World Saxophone Quartet: Steppin' with
- Arthur Blythe: Lenox Avenue Breakdown
- Paul Winter: Common Ground
- Kenny Barron: Innocence
- Fred Anderson: Another Place
- Guenter Hampel: Freedom of the Universe
- Dewey Redman: Soundsigns
- Misha Mengelberg: Pech Onderweg
- Max Roach & Anthony Braxton: Birth and Rebirth
- Chico Freeman: The Outside Within
- Egberto Gismondi: Solo

=== Deaths ===
- Joe Marsala (January 4, 1907 – March 4)
- Larry Young (October 7, 1940 — March 30)
- Ray Noble (December 17, 1903 – April 3)
- Teddy Hill (December 7, 1909 - May 19)
- Joe Venuti (September 16, 1903 – August 14)
- Don Ellis (July 25, 1934 – December 17)

=== Births ===
- Børge-Are Halvorsen (October 12), Norwegian saxophonist
- Julie Dahle Aagård (December 30), Norwegian singer
- Daniel Heløy Davidsen (December 30), Danish-Norwegian guitarist

== 1979 ==
=== Album releases ===
- Rova Saxophone Quartet: Removal of Secrecy
- Lesli Dalaba: Trumpet Songs And Dances
- Anthony Braxton: Alto Saxophone Improvisations 1979
- Dollar Brand: African Marketplace
- Martial Solal: Four Keys
- Old And New Dreams: Old and New Dreams
- Terje Rypdal: Descendre
- Jack DeJohnette: Special Edition
- Andrew Cyrille: Nuba
- James Newton: Mystery School
- Art Pepper: Straight Life
- Anthony Davis: Hidden Voices
- Errol Parker: Doodles
- Niels-Henning Ørsted Pedersen: Dancing On The Tables
- Amina Claudine Myers: Song For Mother Earth
- George E. Lewis: Homage to Charles Parker
- Paul Motian: Le Voyage
- Bunky Green: Places We've Never Been
- John Surman: Upon Reflection
- Joseph Jarman: The Magic Triangle
- Max Roach & Anthony Braxton: One in Two – Two in One
- Woody Shaw: Woody III
- Max Roach: Pictures in a Frame
- Ralph Towner: Solo Concert
- Kenny Wheeler: Around 6
- Billy Bang: Distinction Without a Difference
- Cecil McBee: Alternate Spaces
- Fred Anderson: Dark Day
- Al Di Meola: Splendido Hotel
- String Trio of New York: First String
- Pat Metheny: American Garage
- Billy Bang: Sweet Space
- Paul Lytton: The Inclined Stick
- Warren Vaché: Polished Brass
- Eberhard Weber: Fluid Rustle
- Guenter Christmann: Weavers
- Michael Franks: Tiger in the Rain

=== Deaths ===
- Grant Green (June 6, 1935 – January 31), American jazz guitarist and composer
- Charles Mingus (April 22, 1922 – January 5)
- Blue Mitchell (March 13, 1930 – May 21)
- Stan Kenton (December 15, 1911 – August 25)
- Wilbur Ware (September 8, 1923 – September 9)

=== Births ===
- Audun Ellingsen (January 4), Norwegian upright-bassist
- Mathias Eick (June 26), Norwegian trumpeter
- Ove Alexander Billington (August 10), Norwegian guitarist
- Jamie Cullum (August 20), British singer/songwriter, pianist, radio personality
- Tora Augestad (December 10), Norwegian singer
