= In Concert: From There to Hear =

Live album by Jerome Cooper
- Released: 2001
- Recorded: 1995–1998
- Venue: Roulette and The Knitting Factory, New York City
- Genre: Jazz
- Label: Mutable Music; 17506-2

Jerome Cooper chronology
Outer and Interactions (1988)	In Concert: From There to Hear (2001)	Alone, Together, Apart (2003)

In Concert: From There to Hear is a live solo percussion album by Jerome Cooper. It was recorded during 1995–1998 at concerts presented at Roulette and The Knitting Factory in New York City, and was released by Mutable Music in 2001.

"Bantul" and "The Indonesian" were composed while Cooper was living in Indonesia, and were influenced by gamelan music and local musicians. According to Cooper, "Monk Funk", previously recorded with a quintet on Outer and Interactions (1988), was inspired by changing his daughter's diapers. "My Funny Valentine" is an improvisation on the well-known jazz standard, with the melody appearing on the chirimia. "My Life", completely improvised, employs two chirimias. Regarding "Goodbye Pork Pie Hat", Cooper wrote: "the melody is so powerful that you can play any chords or rhythm with it".

== Reception ==
Professional ratings
Review scores
Source	Rating
AllMusic	2.5/5 stars
The Penguin Guide to Jazz Recordings	2/4 stars

In a review for AllMusic, François Couture wrote that Cooper's " music is hard to pigeonhole, to say the least. Imagine a drummer who plays this flute with one hand, bass drum and high-hat with his feet, and triggers drum loops, chord sequences, and bass patterns with his other hand. Whether it is written or improvised, the resulting music is closer to world funk than avant-garde jazz... Highly confusing for anyone into avant-garde music and free improv, Cooper's music represents a strange hybrid and a very personal form of expression. Yet, surprisingly, its vocabulary remains somewhat limited."

Glenn Astarita, writing for All About Jazz, stated: "Cooper's remarkable agility and captivating musical spirit is enacted throughout these predominately endearing works... this recording provides listeners with a broad perspective of the artist's irrefutable enthusiasm and glittering musicality."

Author W. C. Bamberger stated that Cooper "approaches the electronic instruments with the same attitude he approaches the acoustic ones... The one-man-band approach, no matter how basic or augmented... always produces very human music."

In an article for One Final Note, Matthew Sumera commented: "Cooper simply tries to do too much at one time, in an almost 'look ma, no hands!' fashion. Clearly, he is a highly competent instrumentalist, capable of extreme independence and even 'multi-dimensionality'... One would like to hear Cooper push some of his explorations further or refine his statements to something more musically engaging."

== Track listing ==
1. "Bantul" (Cooper) – 6:20
2. "Monk Funk" (Cooper) – 15:03
3. "My Funny Valentine" (Richard Rodgers) – 14:53
4. "My Life" (Cooper) – 16:13
5. "Goodbye Pork Pie Hat" (Charles Mingus) – 11:48
6. "The Indonesian" (Cooper) – 4:09
- Track 1 recorded at Roulette on May 28, 1996. Tracks 2 and 3 recorded at Roulette on May 11, 1996. Tracks 4 and 5 recorded at The Knitting Factory on June 3, 1995. Track 6 recorded at Roulette on May 28, 1998.

== Personnel ==
- Jerome Cooper – cymbal, percussion, chirimia, tom tom, bass drum, balaphone, snare drum, talking drum, electronic drums, keyboards, electronics
