= Beyond the Boundary of Time =

Live album by Revolutionary Ensemble
- Released: 2008
- Recorded: May 25, 2005
- Venue: Warsaw, Poland
- Genre: Free Jazz
- Label: Mutable Music; 17532-2

Revolutionary Ensemble chronology
And Now... (2004)	Beyond the Boundary of Time (2008)	Counterparts (2012)

Beyond the Boundary of Time is a live album by the Revolutionary Ensemble, violinist Leroy Jenkins, bassist Sirone and drummer Jerome Cooper. It was recorded in May 2005 in Warsaw, Poland, and was released in 2008 by Mutable Music. The album contains one composition by each group member, along with two collective improvisations. It captures one of the group's last performances, and is dedicated to Jenkins, who died in 2007.

== Reception ==
Professional ratings
Review scores
Source	Rating
Tom Hull – on the Web	B

In a review for All About Jazz, Clifford Allen wrote: "much music happened for the members of the trio between their 1977 Enja swan song and the beginning of the new millennium. While Sirone composed for theater and Jenkins worked in his own numerous ensembles, Jerome Cooper's visibility stateside shrank, though he continued to work on his concept of multi-dimensional drumming... Cooper's composition 'Le-Si-Jer' exemplifies this approach, employing synthesizer as a tonal backing for mostly a capella violin and bass poems. The percussionist's own solo is a multi-layered tone-field employing bass drum, piano, chiramia and bala. In a sense, the music here is imbued with a degree of separateness not found in the Ensemble's early recordings and it's hard to expect a perfect meld after nearly a quarter-century of absence from the international creative music scene. But Cooper's piece allows the three to operate in separate, parallel spheres toward a convergence of grit and ether—a beautiful reprieve, indeed."

Marc Medwin, writing for Dusted Magazine, called the album a "poignant and historically valuable performance," and commented: "The playing is first-rate... It is fascinating to hear the rawly energetic ensemble take on Sirone's 'Configurations,' its modal vamp subsumed by visceral collective improvisation. In contrast, we are treated to a sensually inward reading of Cooper's 'Le-Si-Jer,' a spacious account sporting beautiful contributions... Jenkins is represented by the reflective 'Usami,'... the piece gains in power as it unfolds, building to a powerful climax... The two final tracks, both lengthy improvisations, are full of dynamic contrast and timbral diversity. Grooves are established only to fade seamlessly into the multifarious yet transparent group sound, tiny bursts of electronics lending a touch of modernity to the proceedings."

== Track listing ==
1. "Configuration" (Sirone) – 14:58
2. "Usamiv" (Jenkins) – 8:47
3. "Le-Si-Jer" (Cooper) – 19:11
4. "Improvisation I" (Jenkins, Sirone, Cooper) – 9:54
5. "Improvisation II" (Cooper, Sirone, Jenkins) – 10:13

== Personnel ==
- Leroy Jenkins – violin
- Sirone – bass
- Jerome Cooper – drums, balaphone, chirimia, keyboards
