= Jerome Cooper =

American jazz musician (1946–2015)

- Born: Jerome Douglas Cooper; December 14, 1946; Chicago, Illinois, U.S.
- Died: May 6, 2015 (aged 68) Brooklyn, New York, U.S.
- Genres: Jazz, free jazz
- Instruments: Drums

Jerome Douglas Cooper (December 14, 1946 – May 6, 2015) was an American free jazz musician. In addition to trap drums, Cooper played balafon, chirimia and various electronic instruments, and referred to himself as a "multi-dimensional drummer," meaning that his playing involved "layers of sounds and rhythms". AllMusic reviewer Ron Wynn called him "A sparkling drummer and percussionist... An excellent accompanist". Another Allmusic reviewer stated that "in the truest sense this drummer is a magician, adept at transformation and the creation of sacred space".

== Career ==
Cooper studied with Oliver Coleman and Walter Dyett in the late 1950s and early 1960s, then studied at the American Conservatory of Music and Loop College. In 1968, he worked with Oscar Brown, Jr. and Kalaparusha Maurice McIntyre in the U.S. but moved to Europe before the end of the decade, where he played with Rahsaan Roland Kirk, Steve Lacy, Lou Bennett (with whom he visited Gambia and Senegal), the Art Ensemble of Chicago, Alan Silva, and Noah Howard. After returning to the U.S. in 1971, he joined the Revolutionary Ensemble alongside Leroy Jenkins and Sirone, where he remained for several years, and played piano, flute, and bugle in addition to drums. In the 1970s, he played with Sam Rivers, George Adams, Karl Berger, Andrew Hill, and Anthony Braxton. In the 1980s he worked with McIntyre again, as well as with Cecil Taylor.

== Death ==
Cooper died in Brooklyn on May 6, 2015, aged 68, from complications of multiple myeloma, according to his daughter, Levanah Cummins-Cooper.

== Discography ==
As leader or co-leader

Recording date	Album	Label	Personnel	Release date
1978	Positions 3 6 9	Kharma	With Kalaparusha Maurice McIntyre and Frank Lowe	1978
1978	Root Assumptions	Anima	Solo percussion	1982
1979	For the People	Hat Hut	With Oliver Lake	1980
1979	The Unpredictability of Predictability	About Time	Solo percussion	1979
1987	Outer and Interactions	About Time	With Joseph Jarman, Jason Hwang, William Parker, and Thurman Barker	1988
1995–1998	In Concert: From There to Hear	Mutable Music	Solo percussion	2001
2002	Alone, Together, Apart	Mutable Music	With Thomas Buckner	2003
2007	A Magical Approach	Mutable Music	Solo percussion	2010
2011	As of Not	ILK Music	With Kresten Osgood	2020

With the Revolutionary Ensemble

- 1972: Vietnam (ESP-Disk)
- 1972: Manhattan Cycles (India Navigation)
- 1975: The Psyche (RE Records)
- 1976: The Peoples Republic (A&M/Horizon)
- 1977: Revolutionary Ensemble (Enja)
- 2004: And Now... (Pi Recordings)
- 2008: Beyond the Boundary of Time (Mutable)
- 2012: Counterparts (Mutable)

=== As sideman ===
With Lester Bowie

- Fast Last! (Muse, 1974)

With Anthony Braxton

- New York, Fall 1974 (Arista, 1974)

With Ted Daniel

- Tapestry (Sun Records, 1977)

With Leroy Jenkins and The Jazz Composer's Orchestra

- For Players Only (JCOA, 1975)

With Rahsaan Roland Kirk

- Live in Paris, Vol. 1 (France's Concert Records, 1988)
- Live in Paris, Vol. 2 (France's Concert Records, 1988)
- Dog Years in the Fourth Ring (32 Jazz, 1970 [1997])

With Steve Lacy

- Wordless (Futura, 2009)

With Marcello Melis

- Perdas De Fogu (Vista, 1975)

With Roscoe Mitchell and Don Moye

- Wildflowers 5: The New York Loft Jazz Sessions (one track) (Douglas, 1997); released on CD as Wildflowers: The New York Loft Jazz Sessions - Complete (Knit Classics, 1999)

With Alan Silva

- Seasons (BYG Records, 1971)
- My Country (Leo, 1989)

With Cecil Taylor

- It is in the Brewing Luminous (hat Art, 1980)

With Clifford Thornton

- Communications Network (Third World, 1972)
