= Creative Construction Company (album) =

Live album by Creative Construction Company
- Released: 1975
- Recorded: May 19, 1970 at Washington Square Methodist Church (Peace Church), NYC
- Genre: Jazz
- Length: 36:44
- Label: Muse; MR 5071
- Producer: George Conley

Creative Construction Company chronology
Creative Construction Company (1975)	Creative Construction Company Vol. II (1976)

Creative Construction Company (also referred to as CCC) is a 1975 album by the jazz collective Creative Construction Company, originally released on the Muse label, and later reissued as Muhal on the Italian Vedette label.

== Reception ==
Professional ratings
Review scores
Source	Rating
Allmusic	3/5 stars
The Rolling Stone Jazz Record Guide	3/5 stars

Allmusic awarded the album 3 stars.

== Track listing ==
All compositions by Leroy Jenkins

1. "Muhal (Part I)" - 19:24
2. "Muhal (Part II)" - 14:40
3. "Live Spiral" - 2:40

== Personnel ==
- Anthony Braxton - alto saxophone, soprano saxophone, clarinet, flute, contrabass clarinet, chimes
- Leroy Jenkins - violin, viola, recorder, toy xylophone, harmonica, bicycle horn
- Leo Smith - trumpet, flugelhorn, French horn, seal horn, percussion
- Muhal Richard Abrams - piano, cello, clarinet
- Richard Davis - bass
- Steve McCall - drums, percussion
