= The Unpredictability of Predictability =

Live album by Jerome Cooper
- Released: 1979
- Recorded: July 6, 1979
- Venue: Soundscape, New York City
- Genre: Jazz
- Label: About Time Records; AT-1002
- Producer: Jerome Cooper, Verna Gillis

Jerome Cooper chronology
Positions 3 6 9 (1978)	The Unpredictability of Predictability (1979)	For the People (1980)

The Unpredictability of Predictability is a live solo percussion album by Jerome Cooper. It was recorded in July 1979 at Soundscape in New York City, and was released on LP by About Time Records later that year.

On the album, Cooper plays a variety of instruments, including flute, whistle, balaphone, chirimia, bass drum, cymbal, drums, and tom tom. Writer John Szwed commented: "Cooper added a balafon and horns to his kit... so that he could play like an old-time one-man band (though the results sounded more African than African American)".

In the album liner notes, Cooper wrote: "This is not just an album for drummers... anyone into music can dig this music. Classical music people can dig it because it's structured. People into rock, because of the beat, people into jazz because of the improvisational aspect, and those into ethnic music because of the instruments involved".

== Reception ==
Professional ratings
Review scores
Source	Rating
AllMusic	4/5 stars
MusicHound Jazz	4.5/5 stars
The Rolling Stone Jazz Record Guide	2/5 stars

In a review for AllMusic, Brian Olewnick wrote: "This superb musician... treats his solo performances as free-standing compositions scored for only certain instruments from which he extracts huge volumes of sounds and rhythms... Cooper has no interest in wowing the listener by playing fast or loud, but simply desires to develop lovely rhythms and melodic patterns and allow them to flower. A fine recording and wonderful antidote for those who claim to be bored by drum solos."

Author W. C. Bamberger stated that, in "Movement A, B", a listener "coming to an album billed as solo percussion with expectations of a certain busy-ness" must "let Cooper set his own terms", while in "Movement C", one can "most clearly hear the effects of Cooper's conception of the drum kit as a confederation of separate instruments" as he plays "a kind of lively Q&A session between drums, and between drum and hi-hat". Bamberger described "Bert The Cat" as "skittering, tail-in-the-air fun".

John Corbett called the album a "must-have LP". Drummer Tyshawn Sorey included the recording in a list of "albums featuring live drums that have inspired me over the years".

== Track listing ==
All compositions by Jerome Cooper.

=== Side A ===
1. "The Unpredictability Of Predictability: Movement A, B" – 9:59
2. "The Unpredictability Of Predictability: Movement C" – 4:29
3. "The Unpredictability Of Predictability: Movement C1" – 6:40

=== Side B ===
1. "Bert The Cat" – 20:37

== Personnel ==
- Jerome Cooper – flute, whistle, balafon, chirimia, bass drum, cymbal, drums, tom tom, voice
