= Creative Construction Company Vol. II =

Live album by Creative Construction Company
- Released: 1976
- Recorded: May 19, 1970 at Washington Square Methodist Church (Peace Church), NYC
- Genre: Jazz
- Length: 34:28
- Label: Muse; MR 5097
- Producer: George Conley

Creative Construction Company chronology
Creative Construction Company (1975)	Creative Construction Company Vol. II (1976)

Creative Construction Company Vol. II (also referred to as CCC Vol. II) is a 1976 album by the jazz collective Creative Construction Company, originally released on the Muse label.

== Reception ==
Professional ratings
Review scores
Source	Rating
AllMusic	2/5 stars
The Rolling Stone Jazz Record Guide	3/5 stars

AllMusic awarded the album 2 stars with its review by Eugene Chadbourne stating, "Braxton and company were going somewhere else of great interest by not relying constantly on jazz chops or a standard rhythm section sound, and the guests on this date seem to be blocking the road".

== Track listing ==
All compositions by Leroy Jenkins

1. "No More White Gloves – Part I (With Sand Under Your Shoes Doing a Dance)" - 17:30
2. "No More White Gloves – Part II (With Sand Under Your Shoes Doing a Dance)" - 16:58

== Personnel ==
- Anthony Braxton - alto saxophone, soprano saxophone, clarinet, flute, contrabass clarinet, chimes
- Leroy Jenkins - violin, viola, recorder, toy xylophone, harmonica, bicycle horn
- Leo Smith - trumpet, flugelhorn, French horn, seal horn, percussion
- Muhal Richard Abrams - piano, cello, clarinet
- Richard Davis - bass
- Steve McCall - drums, percussion
