= For the People (Jerome Cooper album) =

Live album by Jerome Cooper
- Released: 1980
- Recorded: May 12, 1979
- Venue: The Kitchen, New York City
- Genre: Jazz
- Length: 40:30
- Label: Hat Hut Records; 1R07
- Producer: Pia Uehlinger and Werner X. Uehlinger

Jerome Cooper chronology
The Unpredictability of Predictability (1979)	For the People (1980)	Root Assumptions (1982)

For the People is a live album by Jerome Cooper. It was recorded in May 1979 at The Kitchen in New York City, and was released on LP by Hat Hut Records in 1980. On the album, Cooper, who plays a variety of instruments, including drums, chirimia, African balaphone, and whistle, is joined by Oliver Lake, who performs on alto saxophone, flute, bells, and vocals.

== Reception ==
Professional ratings
Review scores
Source	Rating
AllMusic	3/5 stars
The Rolling Stone Jazz Record Guide	3/5 stars
The Encyclopedia of Popular Music	3/5 stars

The editors of AllMusic awarded the album 3 stars. A writer for Modern Drummer called the music "compelling duets that never fail to swing." Mats Gustafsson and Björn Thorstensson wrote: "Killer duo album with Cooper and the always-as-amazing Oliver Lake... True interaction with a great sound... Very recommendable music."

== Track listing ==
All compositions by Jerome Cooper.

=== Side A ===
1. "Movement" – 13:50
2. "Movement" – 5:40

=== Side B ===
1. "Movement" – 5:35
2. "Movement" – 4:45
3. "Movement" – 5:00
4. "Movement" – 5:40
- Recorded on May 12, 1979, at The Kitchen in New York City.

== Personnel ==
- Jerome Cooper – drums, chirimia, balafon, whistle
- Oliver Lake – alto saxophone, flute, bells, voice
