= And Now =

And Now may refer to:

- And Now?!, a 2018 album by Klaus Heuser
- And Now!, a 1966 album by Booker T. & the M.G.'s
- And Now..., a 2004 album by the Revolutionary Ensemble
