= Revolutionary Ensemble (album) =

Live album by Revolutionary Ensemble
- Released: 1977
- Recorded: August 18, 1977
- Venue: Moosham Castle, Salzburg, Austria
- Genre: Jazz
- Length: 43:08
- Label: Enja enja 3003
- Producer: Horst Weber, Matthias Wincklemann

Revolutionary Ensemble chronology
The People's Republic (1976)	Revolutionary Ensemble (1977)	And Now... (2004)

Inner City Cover

Revolutionary Ensemble is a live album by the free jazz group consisting of violinist Leroy Jenkins, bassist Sirone and drummer Jerome Cooper, recorded in Austria in 1977 and released on the German Enja label and in the U.S. on Inner City Records the following year.

== Reception ==
Professional ratings
Review scores
Source	Rating
AllMusic	4/5 stars
The Penguin Guide to Jazz Recordings	3/4 stars
The Rolling Stone Jazz Record Guide	5/5 stars

The AllMusic review by Richard Mortifoglio stated, "In retrospect, violinist Leroy Jenkins, bassist Sirone, and drummer Jerome Cooper's free-jazz trio, the Revolutionary Ensemble, stands as a gentler cousin to those original free-jazz collectives, Art Ensemble of Chicago and AACM, the latter of which introduced Jenkins's string playing to the scene. On this live 1977 date, each of the members doubles or triples up on other instruments so there is a variety of textures and timbres to be heard here, including kalimba, flute, and piano. Mostly it's Jenkin's fluent, fugal violin improvisations that predominate, however. At their most successful, these jams sound like a loosely strung Bach "Chaconne" accompanied by bass and drums".

Bob Blumenthal, writing for The Rolling Stone Jazz Record Guide, commented: "Their... instrumentation is perfectly balanced and allows for maximum exploration without unnecessary assault. All three are demonic players, though each... knew the value of restraint, and all three wrote intriguing material...The album captures much of the range, intensity and complementary spirit that made the Revolutionary Ensemble special."

== Track listing ==
1. "Clear Spring" (Sirone) – 10:31
2. "March 4-1" (Jerome Cooper) – 11:48
3. "Chicago" (Leroy Jenkins) – 5:55
4. "Revolutionary Ensemble" (Jenkins, Sirone, Cooper) – 14:56

== Personnel ==
- Leroy Jenkins – violin, kalimba, voice, flute
- Sirone − bass, flute
- Jerome Cooper – drums, piano, balafon, chirimia, flute
