= Solo Concert =

Solo Concert may refer to:

- Solo Concert (Ralph Towner album), 1980
- Solo Concert (Leroy Jenkins album), 1977

== See also ==
- Solo Concerts: Bremen/Lausanne, a 1973 album by Keith Jarrett
