= Counterparts (Revolutionary Ensemble album) =

Live album by Revolutionary Ensemble
- Released: 2012
- Recorded: November 25, 2005
- Venue: Teatro Gustavo Modena, Genoa, Italy
- Genre: Free Jazz
- Label: Mutable Music; 17549-2

Revolutionary Ensemble chronology
Beyond the Boundary of Time (2008)	Counterparts (2012)

Counterparts is a live album by the Revolutionary Ensemble, violinist Leroy Jenkins, bassist Sirone and drummer Jerome Cooper. It was recorded in November 2005 in Genoa, Italy, and was released in 2012 by Mutable Music. It documents the group's last live performance, and is dedicated to the memory of artist Frederick J. Brown.

== Reception ==
Professional ratings
Review scores
Source	Rating
Tom Hull – on the Web	A−

Critic Tom Hull awarded the album a grade of "A−", and commented: "it's more than nostalgia that lifts this release of the group's last live performance."

Writing in 2013, Francis Davis awarded the album a grade of "A", and stated: "it was released only this spring, and I swear it's more vital than almost anything else I've heard in 2013. An apt comparison might be the Modern Jazz Quartet, except that the instrumentation is sparser... and what was permissible in the name of either jazz or classical, or in the name of both, had changed drastically... Though recognizably jazz... this music is post-Webern as well as post-Parker, on the outskirts of microtonality when not forthrightly microtonal." Davis remarked that Jenkins was "in top form," and praised his "masterful display of extended techniques." He described Sirone as "propelling things forward with a low rumble or the barest semblance of a bass walk," and depicted Cooper as a "one-man-band," "not just supplying color on traps but greatly expanding the palette with bell-like balaphone, chirimia... and electric-keyboard washes that are never just backdrops."

The editors of NPR Music included the album in their "Best Music of 2013" feature, and noted: "it's understood that by the time Sirone and Jenkins got together with percussionist Jerome Cooper in 1972, jazz no longer necessarily meant riffs and changes, and modern classical in no way still meant rondos and fugues."

== Track listing ==
1. "Configuration" (Sirone) – 7:00
2. "Rumi Tales" (Jenkins) – 5:41
3. "Usami" (Jenkins) – 6:46
4. "My Birds" (Cooper) – 16:06
5. "Berlin Ertarhung" (Sirone) – 6:32
6. "Fulfillment" (Cooper/Jenkins/Sirone) – 4:38

== Personnel ==
- Leroy Jenkins – violin
- Sirone – bass
- Jerome Cooper – drums, balaphone, chiramia, keyboards
