= Sirone (musician) =

American musician (1940–2009)

- Born: Norris Jones; September 28, 1940; Atlanta, United States
- Died: October 21, 2009 (aged 69) Berlin, Germany
- Genres: Jazz, free jazz, avant-garde jazz.
- Occupations: Musician, songwriter
- Instruments: Bass, trombone

Norris Jones, better known as Sirone (September 28, 1940 – October 21, 2009) was an American jazz bassist, trombonist, and composer.

== Biography ==
Born in Atlanta, Georgia, Sirone worked in Atlanta late in the 1950s and early in the 1960s with "The Group" alongside George Adams; he also recorded with R&B musicians such as Sam Cooke and Smokey Robinson. In 1966, in response to a call from Marion Brown, he moved to New York City, where he co-founded the "Untraditional Jazz Improvisational Team" with Dave Burrell. He also worked with Brown, Gato Barbieri, Pharoah Sanders, Noah Howard, Sonny Sharrock, Sunny Murray, Albert Ayler, Archie Shepp, and Sun Ra, as well as with John Coltrane when he was near the end of his career.

He co-founded the Revolutionary Ensemble with Leroy Jenkins and Frank Clayton in 1971; Jerome Cooper later replaced Clayton in the ensemble, which was active for much of the decade. In the 1970s and early 1980s Sirone recorded with Clifford Thornton, Roswell Rudd, Dewey Redman, Cecil Taylor, and Walt Dickerson.

In the 1980s, he was member of Phalanx, a group with guitarist James "Blood" Ulmer, drummer Rashied Ali, and tenor saxophonist George Adams.

From 1989, he lived in Berlin, Germany, where he was active with his group 'Concord' (with Ben Abarbanel-Wolff and Ulli Bartel.) He was involved in theater, film, and was a practicing Buddhist.

He died on October 21, 2009, at the age of 69.

== Discography ==
=== As leader or co-leader ===
- 1979: Artistry (Of The Cosmos) with James Newton, Don Moye, Muneer Bernard Fennell
- 1982: Life Rays (Soul Note) with Walt Dickerson/Andrew Cyrille
- 2003: Sirone's Concord (Not Two Records)
- 2005: Live (Atavistic Records)
- 2005: Configuration (Silkheart Records) with Billy Bang

With the Revolutionary Ensemble

- 1972: Vietnam (ESP-Disk)
- 1972: Manhattan Cycles (India Navigation)
- 1975: The Psyche (RE Records)
- 1976: The Peoples Republic (A&M/Horizon)
- 1977: Revolutionary Ensemble (Enja)
- 2004: And Now... (Pi Recordings)
- 2008: Beyond the Boundary of Time (Mutable)
- 2012: Counterparts (Mutable)

With Sabir Mateen and Andrew Barker

- 2013: Infinite Flowers (Sagittarius A-Star)

With Oluyemi Thomas and Michael Wimberly

- 2010: Beneath Tones Floor (NoBusiness Records)

=== As sideman ===
With George Adams

- 1989: Nightingale (Blue Note)

With The All Ear Trio (John Tchicai, Thomas Agergaard, and Peter Ole Jorgensen)

- 2008: Boiler (Ninth World Music)

With Albert Ayler

- 2004: Holy Ghost: Rare & Unissued Recordings (1962–70) (Revenant)

With Billy Bang

- 1988: Valve No. 10 (Soul Note)

With Gato Barbieri

- 1967: In Search of the Mystery (ESP-Disk)

With Dane Belany

- 1975: Motivations (Sahara Records)

With Marion Brown

- 1967: Three for Shepp (Impulse!)
- 1968: Why Not? (ESP-Disk)

With Dave Burrell

- 1968: High Won-High Two (Black Lion)

With Zusaan Kali Fasteau

- 2004: Making Waves (Flying Note)

With Charles Gayle

- 1988: Always Born (Silkheart)
- 1988: Homeless (Silkheart)
- 1988: Spirits Before (Silkheart)
- 2003: Shout! (Cleanfeed)

With The Group (Ahmed Abdullah, Marion Brown, Billy Bang, Sirone, Fred Hopkins, Andrew Cyrille)

- 2012: Live (NoBusiness)

With Noah Howard

- 1966: At Judson Hall (ESP-Disk)
- 1969: The Black Ark (Freedom)

With The Jazz Composer's Orchestra

- 1973: Numatik Swing Band (JCOA)
- 1975: For Players Only with Leroy Jenkins (JCOA)

With Guerino Mazzola

- 2009: Liquid Bridges (Springer)

with the William Parker Bass Quartet

- 2006: Requiem (Splasc(H)) – with Charles Gayle

With Phalanx

- 1987: Original Phalanx (DIW Records)
- 1988: In Touch (DIW Records)

With Dewey Redman

- 1973: The Ear of the Behearer (Impulse!)
- 1974: Coincide (Impulse!)

With Pharoah Sanders

- 1969: Izipho Zam (My Gifts) (Strata-East)

With Sonny Sharrock

- 1969: Black Woman (Vortex)

With Cecil Taylor

- 1974: Spring of Two Blue J's (Unit Core)
- 1978: One Too Many Salty Swift and Not Goodbye (hat Hut)
- 1978: Live in the Black Forest (MPS)
- 1978: 3 Phasis (New World)
- 1978: Cecil Taylor Unit (New World)
- 1993: Always a Pleasure (FMP)
- 2022: The Complete, Legendary, Live Return Concert (Oblivion)

With Clifford Thornton

- 1972: Communications Network (Third World)

== Filmography ==
- 2008: Teak Leaves at The Temple by Garin Nugroho
