= Manhattan Cycles =

Live album by Revolutionary Ensemble
- Released: 1973
- Recorded: December 31, 1972
- Venue: St. Marks Theater, New York City
- Genre: Jazz
- Length: 41:00
- Label: India Navigation; IN 1023
- Producer: The Revolutionary Ensemble

Revolutionary Ensemble chronology
Vietnam (1972)	Manhattan Cycles (1973)	The Psyche (1975)

Manhattan Cycles is a live album by the Revolutionary Ensemble, violinist Leroy Jenkins, bassist Sirone and drummer Jerome Cooper, which was recorded on the last day of 1972 and released on the India Navigation label the following year. The album documents a performance of an extended composition by Leo Smith.

Author Bob Gluck referred to the first half of "Manhattan Cycles: Side One" as shifting from foregrounded solos to what he calls "parallel play," a technique at which the group excelled, and "a performance mode in which all three musicians pursued their own direction while contributing to a shared overall construction. The 'glue' for such performance is a combined energy level, density, texture, and sense of shared purpose." He noted that, due to the trio's cooperative orientation, "The Revolutionary Ensemble had no leader looking in from outside the hub of activity, no Miles Davis to limit musical forays from continuing until their logical end, however anarchic the journey."

== Reception ==
Professional ratings
Review scores
Source	Rating
AllMusic	4/5 stars
The Rolling Stone Jazz Record Guide	4/5 stars

The AllMusic review awarded the album 4 out of 5 stars.

A reviewer for Destination Out commented: "Recorded on New Year's Eve, 1972/73, there was doubtless plenty to be bombastic about at that time. But what we get instead is as un-bombastic as it gets. This is perhaps the most revolutionary aspect: no foreground, no background, a cooperative enterprise that enlists every technique at the artists' disposal... The entire performance is a model of interplay."

== Track listing ==
All compositions by Leo Smith.

1. "Manhattan Cycles: Side One" – 23:00
2. "Manhattan Cycles: Side Two" – 18:00

== Personnel ==
- Leroy Jenkins – violin, viola
- Jerome Cooper – drums, bugle, metal hoops, flute, tape recorder
- Sirone − bass
