= Root Assumptions =

Studio album by Jerome Cooper
- Released: 1982
- Recorded: April 14, 1978
- Studio: New York City
- Genre: jazz, percussion music
- Label: Anima Productions; ANIMA 2J11C
- Producer: John Mingione

Jerome Cooper chronology
For the People (1980)	Root Assumptions (1982)	Outer and Interactions (1988)

Root Assumptions is a solo percussion album by Jerome Cooper. It was recorded in April 1978 in New York City, and was released by Anima Productions in 1982. On the album, Cooper performs on a variety of percussion instruments, including African balaphone, bass drum, and sock cymbal.

== Reception ==
Professional ratings
Review scores
Source	Rating
AllMusic	4.5/5 stars
The Encyclopedia of Popular Music	4/5 stars
The Rolling Stone Jazz Record Guide	3/5 stars

In a review for AllMusic, Brian Olewnick wrote: "On Root Assumptions, with a balaphone (an African antecedent to the marimba) featured prominently, Cooper creates an amazing and beautiful variety of percussive sounds, rhythms, and melodies... making the session an unforgettable one. His main source of inspiration appears to have been the West African percussive tradition and, possibly, the minimalism of Steve Reich, himself heavily influenced by Ghanaian drumming. The pure musicality of Cooper's sound is astonishing and the listener quickly forgets that he/she is listening to a 'mere' drummer. Root Assumptions is one of the finest solo efforts by any jazz musician, regardless of instrument, and is very highly recommended to listeners of progressive jazz, minimalism, and traditional African music."

Nate Chinen, writing for The New York Times, described Cooper as "an alert, rigorously precise drummer who drew from a wide palette of textures," and noted that Root Assumptions "evoked both tribal music and minimalism."

A reviewer for New Age magazine wrote: "Using an African balaphone, a bass drum, and a sock cymbal, [Cooper] creates mysterious modern rituals which produce nice psychic effects for the attentive listener."

== Track listing ==
All compositions by Jerome Cooper.

1. "Root Assumption Part I" – 17:55
2. "Root Assumption Part II" – 14:35

== Personnel ==
- Jerome Cooper – balafon, cymbal, drums, percussion, bass drum
