= Trinity Chapel, New York University =

Chapel in Manhattan, New York

Coordinates: 40°43′48″N 73°59′53.1″W

New York University Trinity Chapel

General information
- Architectural style: Brutalist or Modernist
- Location: New York, New York, United States of America
- Construction started: 1961
- Completed: 1964
- Demolished: 2009
- Client: Roman Catholic Archdiocese of New York

Technical details
- Structural system: Reinforced concrete

Design and construction
- Architect: Eggers & Higgins

Holy Trinity Chapel of New York University was NYU's former Generoso Pope Catholic Center and Catholic chapel, located at 58 Washington Square South, West Village, Manhattan, New York. It was built 1961–1964 and was a prominent example of the Brutalist architectural style, executed in reinforced concrete and modernist stained glass. It was designed by the noted American architectural firm of Eggers & Higgins.

The chapel occupied highly desirable land on Washington Square, and a decision was made to close the chapel and redirect Catholic Center services to a nearby parish, the Church of St. Joseph on Sixth Avenue at Washington Place. It was briefly rented to Washington Square Methodist Episcopal Church when that congregation left its 1860 church in 2004 and before the community joined with 2 others elsewhere as The Church of the Village.

The New York Times reported that it was sold in early 2009 for $25 million for redevelopment to the university. "The fate of the chapel has created little stir, perhaps because many residents aren't very fond of its looks. Built in the 1960s, the chapel incorporates elements of Brutalist architecture, known for its liberal use of concrete.... 'It’s not terribly pleasing to the eye,' said Brad Hoylman, chairman of Community Board 2, which includes Washington Square Park. He added, however, that there was at least some anxiety about what may replace it."

The AIA Guide to NYC (2010) described the chapel as "awkward Modernism from a time when the search for form preoccupied American architects." The building was demolished in 2009.
