= Revolutionary Ensemble =

American free jazz trio

- Genres: Free jazz
- Years active: 1970–1977, 2004
- Past members: Leroy Jenkins; Sirone; Jerome Cooper

The Revolutionary Ensemble was a free jazz trio consisting of violinist Leroy Jenkins (1932–2007), bassist Sirone (Norris Jones, 1940–2009) and percussionist/pianist Jerome Cooper (1946–2015). The group was active from 1970–1977, and reunited briefly in 2004. Musician George E. Lewis described the trio as "one of the signal groups of the period." Writer John Fordham stated that the group "was remarkable for its concentration on texture, tone colour and the then unclaimed territory between jazz and contemporary classical music." A DownBeat reviewer, writing in 1972, described them as "a unique, utterly contemporary unit of extraordinarily talented players who possess a world understanding of what 'organized sound' is all about."

== History ==
Prior to the formation of the Revolutionary Ensemble in 1970, Jenkins, recently returned from Europe, had been playing with Anthony Braxton and Leo Smith in a group called Creative Construction Company. Following a May 19, 1970 performance by the group at Greenwich Village's "Peace Church", Braxton left, and joined Chick Corea's group, which became known as Circle. Jenkins began playing with a large group that included Sirone, who had previously played with Pharoah Sanders, Marion Brown, and Gato Barbieri, and to whom Jenkins had been introduced by drummer Sunny Murray. The two began discussing the possibility of forming a new group, and Sirone proposed a leaderless lineup of violin, bass, and drums, to which Jenkins initially responded with shock, before suggesting the name Revolutionary Ensemble. (Sirone later recalled that other musicians told him "You must be crazy. Violin, bass, and drums!") They recruited drummer Frank Clayton, but he was soon replaced by Jerome Cooper, who had been playing in Europe with Steve Lacy, Rahsaan Roland Kirk, the Art Ensemble of Chicago, and others, and who, after leaving Europe and arriving in New York, contacted Jenkins at the recommendation of Roscoe Mitchell.

The trio began rehearsing on a regular basis at Ornette Coleman's Artists House loft, where Jenkins had been living, as well as at the home of artist Fred Brown. Jenkins recalled: "we got together and practiced every day... five days a week, anywhere from 11 to two o'clock. I mean, we just hung out. We just played and played, and my art of improvisation got tremendously better, and the group got beautifully tight." In 1971, the group began rehearsing at the annex to Joseph Papp's Public Theater, then presented a concert there. The following year, they booked a four week engagement at the Mercer Arts Center. According to Jenkins, "first week... nobody was there. Second week, two or three. Third week it was half packed. The fourth week it was jam-packed." By 1972, the group was performing more regularly, with concerts at Artists House, the Jamaica Art Center in Queens, the Five Spot, and the Village Vanguard, as well as various radio interviews. In March of that year, they presented a concert at the Peace Church, a recording of which was released on the ESP-Disk label as their first album Vietnam. On December 31, 1972, they performed at the St. Marks Theater, and released a live recording of the concert as their second album, Manhattan Cycles, issued on India Navigation the following year.

By the mid-1970s, the group was receiving greater recognition, and began appearing at festivals. In 1975, they formed a record company named RE Records for the purpose of releasing their third album, The Psyche. They then left for a European tour, taking boxes of the LPs with them, and selling out the first and only pressing to European record dealers. The group also landed a short-lived recording contract with Horizon Records, a subsidiary of A&M Records, allowing them to record and release their first studio album, The People's Republic. However, according to Sirone, when A&M's cofounder Herb Alpert played an excerpt from the album for musical director Quincy Jones, it elicited a harsh, negative reaction, with Jones claiming that he had "been conned; that it wasn't jazz or music and blah blah blah." (A&M closed Horizon Records in 1979 following a slump in music sales.)

In 1977, the group released their fifth album, Revolutionary Ensemble, recorded live in Austria, on the Enja label. However, work began to dry up, and, at the same time, the musicians were being pulled in different artistic directions. Cooper recalled: "I was going into more of a shamanistic journey. I was hanging out with this Mexican, pre-Columbian drummer, Antonio Zapata. And Sirone was going into theater and moving to Berlin. Leroy was going into a more notated European music." The group disbanded that year. However, in 2004, the Mutable Music label reissued The Psyche on CD, and the trio reunited, performing at the Vision Festival, and recording their second and final studio album, And Now..., for Pi Recordings. In May of the following year, they performed in Warsaw, Poland; the concert was recorded and released by Mutable Music in 2008 as Beyond the Boundary of Time. In November 2005, they played in Genoa, Italy, yielding the album Counterparts, released by Mutable in 2012. Jenkins's death in 2007 precluded any further reunions.

== Legacy and music ==
The Revolutionary Ensemble was unusual in that it was a cooperative group, with all three members contributing compositions. Sirone recalled that, in early discussions with Jenkins, he insisted: "everybody has to hold their own ground. We're not talking about no leaders here." Cooper reflected: "we weren't like a trio. We were three individuals playing." Jenkins enjoyed the absence of a group leader, stating: "It takes a lot of the load off you. A leader has a lot of extra work and the other guys sit back and get all the benefits of his work. The leader also becomes a father complex and a lot of leaders just don't want to be a father." Author Bob Gluck summed up the musical results of this approach: "individual and group configurations were malleable constructs, one giving way to the other without so much as a moment's notice. Collectivity could just as soon feature simultaneous and multiple individual initiatives as it could musical togetherness. Construction of a cohesive whole was constantly subject to instantaneous negotiation. Some might view this approach as anarchic, but the three musicians of the Revolutionary Ensemble functioned like a musical high-wire act, sounding sometimes like one voice and at other times like independent individuals coexisting in the same sound space."

The group's primary instrumentation was also unique, and each of the members doubled on secondary instruments. Although his primary instrument was violin, Jenkins also played viola, alto saxophone, kalimba, recorder, percussion, flute, and harmonica. In addition to playing bass, Sirone played trombone, percussion, and flute, while Cooper played an array of percussion instruments, bugle, flute, piano, electronic keyboards, and saw.

The ensemble's musical style was characterized by three notable traits. The first is "parallel play," "a performance mode in which all three musicians pursued their own direction while contributing to a shared overall construction. The 'glue' for such performance is a combined energy level, density, texture, and sense of shared purpose." The second is the fact that Sirone's bass is rarely heard in a conventional, supportive mode, and instead maintains equal footing with the other instruments. The third is an emphasis on musical texture and the physicality of the instruments as conveyed through sound, what Bob Gluck referred to as "collective sound paintings."

Sirone summed up his experience with the group: "It was very difficult even to be alive for the three of us, and it's a miracle in itself playing this music; the dedication that we put towards this music... having the rare opportunity to write music like that and have musicians to honestly approach it. That just don't happen every day."

== Discography ==
- 1972: Vietnam (ESP-Disk)
- 1972: Manhattan Cycles (India Navigation)
- 1975: The Psyche (RE Records)
- 1976: The People's Republic (A&M/Horizon)
- 1977: Revolutionary Ensemble (Enja)
- 2004: And Now... (Pi)
- 2008: Beyond the Boundary of Time (Mutable) recorded 2005
- 2012: Counterparts (Mutable) recorded 2005
