= Swift Are the Winds of Life =

Studio album by Rashied Ali and Leroy Jenkins
- Released: 1976
- Recorded: September 18, 1975
- Venue: Studio 77, New York City
- Genre: jazz
- Length: 30:24
- Label: Survival Records; SR 112

Leroy Jenkins chronology
For Players Only (1975)	Swift Are the Winds of Life (1976)	Solo Concert (1977)

Rashied Ali chronology
N.Y. Ain't So Bad (1976)	Swift Are the Winds of Life (1976)	Rashied Ali in France (1989)

Swift Are the Winds of Life is an album by drummer Rashied Ali and violinist / composer Leroy Jenkins. It was recorded in September 1975 at Studio 77 in New York City, and was released by Survival Records in 1976. The album was reissued by Knit Classics in 2000.

Regarding the circumstances surrounding the recording, Ali recalled: "It just happened. Le was working with the Revolutionary Ensemble and I was working with my band, and we never played together, and so we decided to get together. We came into the club when it was closed, I turned on the tape recorder and we just started playing. We put it down on tape not even thinking that it was gonna turn out the way that it turned out, and that was the first and the last time we played."

In the album liner notes, Stanley Crouch commented: "The duet has a unique and significant place in Jazz... what the duet has always shown off is the call-and-response as well as the counterpoint so basic to the Jazz ensemble of any size and has made clear the degree of completeness two improvising musicians can achieve. But in the music that has developed within the last two decades, the duet serves another purpose, and that purpose is the same as it served in the days of the collectively improvising New Orleans ensemble: clearing the air."

== Reception ==
Professional ratings
Review scores
Source	Rating
AllMusic	4.5/5 stars
The Penguin Guide to Jazz	4/4 stars
Tom Hull – on the Web	A−

In a review for AllMusic, Brian Olewnick wrote: "Swift Are the Winds of Life represents one of the absolute finest examples of Jenkins' violin playing outside of his Revolutionary Ensemble and arguably one of Rashied Ali's greatest recordings aside from Interstellar Space, his legendary duo session with John Coltrane. A violin/drums duo may strike some as strange and unwieldy, but these musicians pull it off so well one never even considers any 'lack' of depth or richness... The compositions, all by Jenkins, range from torrid and in-your-face... to bluesy to abstract, none of them especially difficult for the new listener. A very fine (if all too short) recording, one of the best to emerge from the New York City 'loft jazz' scene of the '70s."

The authors of the Penguin Guide to Jazz Recordings called the album "a forgotten classic," and stated: "Jenkins is in astonishing form, complex, aery, earthy, ruthlessly direct by turns... the blues are never far away, and on 'The Stomp' the two players go for it in a joyously unfettered way."

Robert Palmer, writing for The New York Times, stated: "The two players are so resourceful, especially in their use of changing textures and densities, that their interactions retain a mesmerizing intensity and purpose from beginning to end, making this one of the essential recordings of the new jazz."

In an article for All About Jazz, Jack Gold-Molina remarked: "Here is an album that... features some blazing drum set playing on the part of Ali. At just over 30 minutes in length, Jenkins composes and plays against Ali beautifully."

Henry Kuntz, writing for Bells, commented: "Historically, Ali's work on Interstellar Space... is his most important; if he doesn't actually go beyond those parameters here, he continues in largely the same vein. More than anyone, he captures for me much of the spirit of Art Blakey, with all of the raw, explosive urgency that that implies. Driven by that, Leroy Jenkins offers some of his finest playing on record. He also contributes the album's four compositions."

== Track listing ==
All compositions by Leroy Jenkins.

1. "Past" – 7:26
2. "It's For You" – 7:40
3. "The Stomp" – 5:00
4. "Swift Are the Winds of Life" – 10:18

== Personnel ==
- Leroy Jenkins – violin
- Rashied Ali – drums
