= Vietnam (Revolutionary Ensemble album) =

Live album by Revolutionary Ensemble
- Released: 1972
- Recorded: March 1972
- Venues: The Peace Church, Manhattan, NY
- Genre: Jazz
- Length: 47:10
- Labels: ESP-Disk; ESP 3007
- Producer: Revolutionary Ensemble

Revolutionary Ensemble chronology
Vietnam (1972)	Manhattan Cycles (1973)

Vietnam, also referred to as Vietnam 1 & 2 (Live at Peace Church) is a live album by the Revolutionary Ensemble, violinist Leroy Jenkins, bassist Sirone and drummer Jerome Cooper, which was recorded in 1972 and released on the ESP-Disk label.

The members of the group had been playing together since 1970, and, according to Sirone, were anxious to release a record. He decided to approach Bernard Stollman, founder of ESP-Disk. Sirone recalled: "it was not a problem. You did not have to go through a whole lot of negotiating. He heard the music, he knew of the group, and he said, 'All right, do it.' We brought him a tape that we had recorded, a live concert in the Peace Church on West 4th Street, near Washington Square Park. It wasn't the best sound, because the church had this echo a lot of times, but if you were into the music, you could hear the instruments. Of course, Leroy wanted the audio to be clearer than it was, but I said, 'Let's go with it,' and it was not a problem for Bernard." In the end, Sirone was pleased with the disc, stating "It was a strong recording, and a good representation of the group."

Author Bob Gluck referred to the opening of Vietnam as an example of what he calls "parallel play," a technique at which the group excelled, and "a performance mode in which all three musicians pursued their own direction while contributing to a shared overall construction. The 'glue' for such performance is a combined energy level, density, texture, and sense of shared purpose." He noted that, due to the trio's cooperative orientation, "The Revolutionary Ensemble had no leader looking in from outside the hub of activity, no Miles Davis to limit musical forays from continuing until their logical end, however anarchic the journey."

== Reception ==
Professional ratings
Review scores
Source	Rating
AllMusic	4/5 stars
The Penguin Guide to Jazz	3/4 stars
All About Jazz #1	4.5/5 stars
All About Jazz #2	4/5 stars
The Rolling Stone Jazz Record Guide	5/5 stars

The AllMusic review by Eugene Chadbourne stated "There is an intense emotional involvement with the playing that comes across through every sound made, but this was always the case with this group. Obviously, anyone with any intelligence had strong feelings about the war in Vietnam during the early '70s, and it could be said with accuracy that any performance of this group would have been about Vietnam just as much as this one was, as well as being about any number of other things. The great thing about the Revolutionary Ensemble was the range of grooves and sound areas the trio would get into, much of which is represented as this piece unfolds. The cooking sound of drums, bass, and the violin of Leroy Jenkins soaring above was sometimes what certain parts of the audience were always waiting for, but, like many of the AACM groups, this trio also loved to explore the worlds of silence and space".

The authors of The Penguin Guide to Jazz awarded the album 3 stars, and wrote: "the music is harsh and demanding, but Jenkins's interest in developing improvisations from small cells or motives is immediately evident, as is Sirone's ability to translate such ideas into a lower register and slower delivery, and Cooper's willingness to add an abstract orchestral quality to the music as well as line and metre. It remains a powerful performance, subtler than its rather two-dimensional register suggests."

On All About Jazz, Raoul D'Gama Rose noted "It is hard to imagine why it was not first greeted with more fanfare upon its original release, but perhaps the world of art was much crueler towards modern musicians. The music on Vietnam rises like a primordial wail and growl from the guts of Jenkins' violin and Sirone's bass. ... Vietnam is a staggering composition; an epic lament of two peoples and the world at war. If it was not recognized as a major contribution in 1971, that fact ought to be reconsidered today". In a separate review for the same publication, Jerry D'Souza commented: "the music moves across a wide expanse. Fluidity and fractured movement are put into a melting pot. What emerges is a document of the way in which the trio circumvented form and gave their music an impressive definition... The trio never settles down into a predictable pattern. The creative fire is constantly burning... Nothing is as it seems, nothing is as it should be. And that makes this CD mesmerizing." In a third All About Jazz article, Clifford Allen wrote: "An auspicious debut, Vietnam is an extremely intense slab of music and unlike anything else in the ESP catalogue."

Writing for NPR Music, Lars Gotrich commented: "it's clear from the outset that Jenkins, Sirone and Cooper were onto something radical. They intersected chamber music, backwoods hoedowns and free improvisation in a way that called out to new thinking... Sirone, in particular, is a wonder even at this early stage in his career. He almost never walks a scale, but when he does, fragments are seared in rapid-fire plucks. Sirone mostly disarmed with his bow. He could be as light as Jenkins' playful violin, mimicking his Appalachian-style explorations. But when drummer Jerome Cooper lit the fire, Sirone equalled him in force, hitting the bow to the strings in a tangible, grab-you-by-the-shirt kind of way. It's thrilling. Despite the LP's intentioned protest against the Vietnam War, the call for musical and political change still resonates through a new era."

In a review for Stereogum, Michael Nelson wrote: "The interaction between Jenkins and Sirone is extremely intense. The bassist's tone is huge, often blowing out into distortion as he strikes the strings with seismic force. Meanwhile, the violin shifts back and forth between high-speed, gypsy-hillbilly sawing and slow, mournful passages. Cooper's drumming is more accent than engine, occasionally intruding on the violin-bass dialogue but mostly letting the other two men do their thing and interjecting a snare roll or quick flicker of the cymbals from the background. It's not until the beginning of the album's second half that he erupts, kicking things off with a five-minute drum solo that wipes away everything that came before."

Writer Graham Reid included the recording in his list of "10 Rare Free Jazz Albums I'm Proud to Own," and remarked: "Just as Jimi Hendrix's treatment of The Star Spangled Banner conjured up horrifying images of Vietnam under the pall of napalm and bombs dropped from invisible planes above, at times this short version of the title piece evokes something just as dark... but more in the nature of a dislocating fire-fight by night experienced in a foxhole or under an oppressive jungle canopy."

== Track listing ==
All compositions by the Revolutionary Ensemble.

1. "Vietnam 1" – 23:00
2. "Vietnam 2" – 24:10

== Personnel ==
- Leroy Jenkins – violin, viola
- Sirone − bass, cello
- Jerome Cooper – percussion
