= Mixed Quintet =

Studio album by Leroy Jenkins
- Released: 1979
- Recorded: March 22–23, 1979
- Genre: Jazz
- Length: 37:26
- Label: Black Saint
- Producer: Leroy Jenkins

Leroy Jenkins chronology
Space Minds, New Worlds, Survival of America (1979)	Mixed Quintet (1979)	Straight Ahead/Free at Last (1979)

Mixed Quintet is an album by American jazz violinist Leroy Jenkins, recorded in 1979 for the Italian label Black Saint.

Regarding the album's title, Jenkins stated: "I called it mixed... because the quintet contains brass, reeds and strings, a mixture of instruments. I wanted to emphasize that this is different than the regular jazz quintet of a rhythm section and two front men." Concerning the music, he commented that it "isn't dependent on changes, it's dependent on direction. Where it came from and where it's going. Some people would call that open-ended, but it's not. We usually don't repeat the same heads, but we often work in a structure of theme / improvisation / theme / improvisation. So you know where you are coming from, and where you've got to go, and you've got a little time to make the ascent, the descent, or whatever is called for."

== Reception ==
Professional ratings
Review scores
Source	Rating
AllMusic	2.5/5 stars
The Penguin Guide to Jazz Recordings	3.5/4 stars
The Rolling Stone Jazz & Blues Album Guide	4/5 stars

The AllMusic review by Dean McFarlane stated: "Exploring the jazz language and improvisation in such an oblique manner, the recording bears many similarities to the work of avant-garde jazz composer Anthony Braxton. An interesting recording yet by no means a representation of the ecstatic peaks Leroy Jenkins was capable of achieving as a free jazz soloist".

The authors of The Penguin Guide to Jazz Recordings awarded the album 3½ stars, calling it "a foretaste of the classical configurations that were to come," and commented: "Some of the titles might sound restrainedly formal... but none... is a merely abstract etude or exercise, and all of them have Jenkins's trademark blend of intense expression and admirable control." They praised the wind players, calling them "masters in their own right," and singled out Ehrlich as "revelatory, a player as strongly rooted in classic jazz as he is in European art music."

== Track listing ==
All compositions by Leroy Jenkins

1. "Shapes, Textures, Rhythms, Moods of Sound" – 19:17
2. "Quintet No. 3" – 18:09

- Recorded at CI Studios in New York City on March 22 & 23, 1979

== Personnel ==
- Leroy Jenkins – violin, viola
- James Newton – flute
- Marty Ehrlich – bass clarinet
- John Clark – French horn
- J. D. Parran – clarinet
