= Space Minds, New Worlds, Survival of America =

Studio album by Leroy Jenkins
- Released: 1979
- Recorded: August and September 1978
- Genre: jazz, electronic music
- Label: Tomato Records; TOM-8001

Leroy Jenkins chronology
The Legend of Ai Glatson (1978)	Space Minds, New Worlds, Survival of America (1979)	Mixed Quintet (1979)

Space Minds, New Worlds, Survival of America is an album by violinist and composer Leroy Jenkins. It was recorded in August and September 1978, and was released on LP by Tomato Records in 1979. On the album, Jenkins is joined by George Lewis on electronics and trombone, Richard Teitelbaum on synthesizer, Anthony Davis on electric piano and piano, and Andrew Cyrille on percussion.

The album consists of two contrasting sides. Side A, marked "Play loud," is a single, long, suite-like composition titled "Space Minds, New Worlds, Survival of America," featuring electronic instruments, while side B, marked "Play soft," features four pieces played on acoustic instruments. Jenkins explained the album title: "Space Minds" concerns "the space age and how that will affect the minds of people in the future." "New Worlds" pertains to "the way certain things — ideas, nations — are going down and others are coming up, with science moving into new worlds... a new consciousness." Regarding "Survival of America," Jenkins stated: "America seems to be the key to the world's relations, so that means survival period."

== Reception ==
Professional ratings
Review scores
Source	Rating
AllMusic	4/5 stars
The Penguin Guide to Jazz	3/4 stars
DownBeat	5/5 stars

In a review for AllMusic, Brian Olewnick wrote: "Space Minds, New Worlds, Survival of America represented Leroy Jenkins' first venture into a field where contemporary classical and jazz were beginning to merge, a more modern Third Stream... The piece uses extensive improvised passages, but both the written material and the rhythms employed are relatively distant from a jazz feel, though with Jenkins a strong blues affinity is never far beneath the surface... Space Minds... is a fine album, one of Jenkins' best outside of the Revolutionary Ensemble, and an excellent introduction to his world."

The authors of the Penguin Guide to Jazz Recordings commented: "Space Minds is... reminiscent of Jenkins's AACM-influenced Revolutionary Ensemble. It has the intensity — one might almost say moral intensity — of the RE's powerful... ESP recording Vietnam. Davis and Cyrille act as a twin centre of gravity to which the others make repeated reference. To that extent Jenkins is a traditionalist rather than a radical."

Writing for All About Jazz in 2003, Rex Butters commented: "That this quarter century old artifact sounds as fresh as it does testifies to the vision of its creators... Jenkins and company work wonders on the collective improvs, gracefully weaving and circling each other..."

DownBeat awarded 5 stars. In his review, Kenneth Terry wrote, "it is Jenkins' unique voice that comes through, summing up the particular mood of the moment".

== Track listing ==
All compositions by Leroy Jenkins.

=== Side A: Play loud. ===
Space Minds, New Worlds, Survival of America – 21:09

1. "Blast Off Day (Love – Tolerance – Understanding)"
2. "Discovery (Knowledge – Doubt – Sensitivity)"
3. "Euphoria (Beauty)"
4. "1984"
5. "Self-Realization"
6. "Return Trip"

=== Side B: Play soft. ===
1. "Dancing On A Melody" – 4:37
2. "The Clowns" – 3:18
3. "Kick Back Stomp" – 6:23
4. "Through The Ages Jehovah" – 3:05

== Personnel ==
- Leroy Jenkins – violin
- George Lewis – electronics (side A), trombone
- Richard Teitelbaum – synthesizer (side A)
- Anthony Davis – electric piano (side A), piano
- Andrew Cyrille – percussion
