= Outer and Interactions =

Studio album by Jerome Cooper
- Released: 1988
- Recorded: February 1987
- Studio: Acoustilog, New York City
- Genre: Jazz
- Label: About Time Records; AT-1008
- Producer: Alan Ringel, Ed Fishman, Larry Shengold

Jerome Cooper chronology
Root Assumptions (1982)	Outer and Interactions (1988)	In Concert: From There to Hear (2001)

Outer and Interactions is an album by Jerome Cooper. It was recorded in February 1987 at Acoustilog in New York City, and was released on LP by About Time Records in 1988. On the album, Cooper is joined by saxophonist Joseph Jarman, violinist Jason Hwang, bassist William Parker, and drummer Thurman Barker.

== Reception ==
Professional ratings
Review scores
Source	Rating
AllMusic	4/5 stars

In a review for AllMusic, Brian Olewnick wrote: "The pieces are episodic, full of incisive details, melodic, and swingingly propulsive for the most part, tightly performed by the intriguing band... Outer and Interactions is one of the finer group recordings to have emerged from the American avant jazz scene of the late '80s, but one that went virtually unrecognized. Highly recommended."

Writing for The Hum, Bradford Bailey commented: "Outer and Interactions is a decidedly avant-garde gesture which can't help being funky. It's challenging, fun, filled with joy, and defies the easy categorization of Jazz... It's an album I find myself going back to time and time again, never quite able to wipe the smile from my face."

== Track listing ==
All compositions by Jerome Cooper.

=== Side A ===
1. "Moments" – 9:48
2. "Outer And Interactions" – 10:35
3. "Monk Funk" – 4:24

=== Side B ===
1. "The Hteb Of Hanavel" – 13:03
2. "The Crouch Opinion" – 6:14
3. "Arcunum II" – 3:38

== Personnel ==
- Jerome Cooper – drums, chirimia, balafon, flute, percussion
- Joseph Jarman – tenor saxophone, flute
- Jason Hwang – violin
- William Parker – bass
- Thurman Barker – drums
