= Leroy Jenkins (musician) =

American composer and violinist (1932–2007)

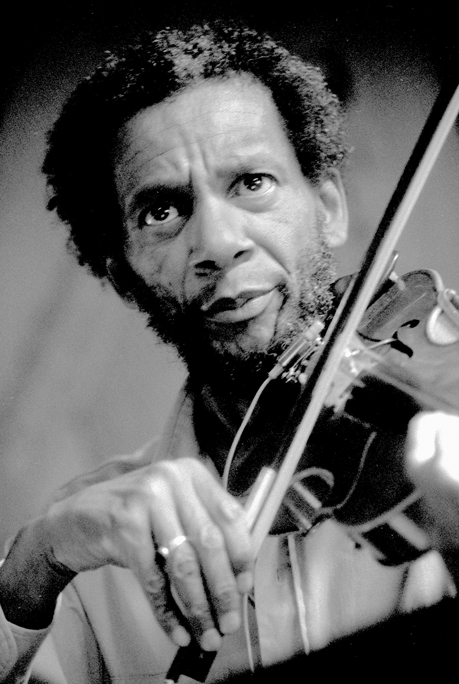
- Jenkins in the 1980s

Background information
- Born: March 11, 1932; Chicago, Illinois, U.S.
- Died: February 24, 2007 (aged 74) New York City, U.S.
- Genres: Contemporary classical music, Avant-garde jazz
- Occupations: Composer, musician
- Instruments: Violin, Viola
- Years active: 1960s–2007
- Labels: India Navigation, Black Saint; Pi Recordings

Leroy Jenkins (March 11, 1932 – February 24, 2007) was an American composer and violinist/violist.

== Early life ==
Jenkins was born in Chicago, Illinois, United States. As a youth, he lived with his sister, his mother, two aunts, his grandmother, and, on occasions, a boarder, in a three-bedroom apartment. Jenkins was immersed in music from an early age, and recalled listening to Charlie Parker, Dizzy Gillespie, and singers such as Billy Eckstine and Louis Jordan. When Jenkins was around eight years old, one of his aunts brought home a boyfriend who played the violin. After hearing him play a difficult Hungarian dance, Jenkins begged his mother for a violin, and was given a red, half-size Montgomery Ward violin that cost twenty-five dollars. He began taking lessons, and was soon heard at St. Luke's Baptist Church, where he was frequently accompanied on piano by Ruth Jones, later known as Dinah Washington. Jenkins eventually joined the church choir and orchestra, and performed on the violin at church banquets, teas, and social events.

As a teenager, Jenkins entered DuSable High School, where he switched to clarinet and alto saxophone due to the fact that the school did not have an orchestra, limiting his opportunities to play the violin. During this time, he came under the influence of bandleader "Captain" Walter Dyett. After graduating, Jenkins attended Florida A&M University, where he resumed study of the violin. In 1961, he graduated with a degree in music education, then moved to Mobile, Alabama, where he taught music in the public school system for four years.

== Career ==
In the mid-1960s, Jenkins moved back to Chicago, and took a job in the public school system. At one point, he attended an AACM event featuring music by Roscoe Mitchell, performed by Maurice McIntyre, Charles Clark, Malachi Favors, Alvin Fielder, and Thurman Barker. Jenkins recalled being both confused and excited, and was thrilled to be included in a collective improvisation after taking out his violin. He began participating in AACM rehearsals led by Muhal Richard Abrams, recalling: "it was something different, something where I could really be violinistic... I discovered that I would be able to play more of my instrument and I wouldn't have to worry about the cliches... I found out that I could really soar, I found out how I could really play." Jenkins would rehearse and perform with the group for roughly four years, and made his recording debut in 1967 on Abrams's Levels and Degrees of Light.

During this time, Jenkins began playing in a trio format with fellow AACM members Anthony Braxton and Leo Smith, recording the album 3 Compositions of New Jazz in 1968. (Abrams also appears on the album.) In 1969, the trio moved to Paris, where they began playing with drummer Steve McCall, who had moved to Europe several years prior, in a group that became known as the Creative Construction Company. While in Paris, Jenkins had to opportunity to perform with a wide range of musicians, including Archie Shepp and Philly Joe Jones, with whom he recorded, Alan Silva, on whose album Luna Surface he appeared, and Ornette Coleman, who at one point organized a joint Paris concert featuring the Creative Construction Company, the Art Ensemble of Chicago, and Coleman's own group. That same year, Jenkins participated in the recording of Braxton's album B-Xo/N-0-1-47a for BYG Actuel.

In 1970, Jenkins left Paris, later stating that he did not feel comfortable with the fact that he did not speak French, and moved to New York City. Upon his arrival, he reconnected with Coleman and moved into Coleman's Artists House loft, where he lived for several months. He recalled: "We stayed downstairs... It was cold down there, where we slept. Ornette gave us a mattress but he didn't realize how cold it was." Coleman served as Jenkins's mentor, introducing him to the many musicians who frequented his loft. Meanwhile, Jenkins continued performing and rehearsing with the Creative Construction Company, culminating in a concert at Greenwich Village's "Peace Church" on May 19, 1970. The concert, which also featured Muhal Richard Abrams and bassist Richard Davis, was recorded thanks to Coleman, who arranged for an engineer to be present, and was released by Muse Records in two volumes.

Following the May concert, Braxton joined Chick Corea's group, which became known as Circle. Jenkins went on to form the Revolutionary Ensemble with bassist Sirone and percussionist Jerome Cooper, a group that would last roughly six years. During the early and mid-1970s, he also performed and recorded with Alice Coltrane, Don Cherry, Carla Bley, Grachan Moncur III, Rahsaan Roland Kirk, Paul Motian, Dewey Redman, and Archie Shepp. In 1974, the Jazz Composer's Orchestra commissioned Jenkins to compose a large-scale work, resulting in the album For Players Only. In 1975, he recorded Swift Are the Winds of Life, an album of duets with drummer Rashied Ali. These albums would be followed by over a dozen releases under his name over the next thirty years.

During the late 1970s, Jenkins performed and recorded with pianist/composer Anthony Davis and drummer Andrew Cyrille, and in the early 1980s, he formed a band called Sting, with two violins, two guitars, electric bass, and drums. During this time, in addition to placing in reader and critic polls in Jazz Magazine and DownBeat, he began receiving greater recognition as a composer, garnering commissions and grants from the New York State Council on the Arts, the New York Foundation for the Arts, and the National Endowment for the Arts, and performances from groups like the Kronos Quartet, the Brooklyn Philharmonic, the New Music Consort, the Pittsburgh New Music Ensemble, and the Cleveland Chamber Symphony, among others. In the late 1980s, Jenkins toured and recorded with Cecil Taylor, and received a commission from Hans Werner Henze, artistic director of the Munich Biennial New Music Theatre Festival, enabling him to compose Mother of Three Sons, a dance-opera based on African mythology, in collaboration with choreographer/director Bill T. Jones and librettist Ann T. Greene. The work was premiered in Munich in 1990, and was also performed by the New York City Opera (US premiere, 1991) and the Houston Grand Opera (1992).

The 1990s and 2000s saw a continuation of Jenkins's success as a composer. New works included Fresh Faust, a jazz-rap opera, written for Boston's Institute of Contemporary Art; The Negro Burial Ground, a cantata presented by The Kitchen and workshopped at UMass Amherst; the opera The Three Willies, presented at the Painted Bride in Philadelphia and at the Kitchen; and Coincidents an opera with librettist Mary Griffin, performed at Roulette in New York. He also participated in a reunion of the Revolutionary Ensemble, and performed and recorded with the group Equal Interest, which featured Jenkins on violin, Joseph Jarman on woodwinds, and Myra Melford on piano. He collaborated and toured with various choreographers, and formed a world-music improvisation ensemble. In 2004, he was awarded a Guggenheim Fellowship. Jenkins also held residencies at a number of American universities, including Duke, Carnegie Mellon, Williams, Brown, Harvard, and Oberlin.

== Death ==
Jenkins died from lung cancer on February 24, 2007, in New York City, at the age of 74. At the time of his death he was working on two new operas: Bronzeville, a history of South Side Chicago, and Minor Triad, a music drama about Paul Robeson, Lena Horne, and Cab Calloway.

== Discography ==
=== As leader/co-leader ===
- For Players Only (JCOA Records, 1975, LP)
- Swift Are the Winds of Life (Survival, 1976, LP)
- Solo Concert (India Navigation, 1977, LP)
- Lifelong Ambitions (Black Saint, 1981, LP; 1993, CD)
- The Legend of Ai Glatson (Black Saint, 1978, LP; 1993, CD)
- Space Minds, New Worlds, Survival of America (Tomato, 1979, LP; 1989, CD)
- Mixed Quintet (Black Saint, 1983, LP; 1997, CD)
- Straight Ahead/Free at Last (Red Record, 1980, LP)
- Urban Blues (Black Saint, 1984, LP; 1997, CD)
- Leroy Jenkins Live! (Black Saint, 1993, CD)
- Themes & Improvisations on the Blues (CRI eXchange, 1994, CD) with Soldier String Quartet, Henry Threadgill, Marty Ehrlich
- Out of the Mist (Ocean, 1997, CD) with Joseph Jarman
- Solo (Lovely Music, 1998, CD)
- Equal Interest (Omnitone Records, 1999, CD) as Equal Interest: with Joseph Jarman and Myra Melford
- The Art of Improvisation (Mutable Music, 2005, CD) with Driftwood

With the Revolutionary Ensemble

- Vietnam (ESP-Disk, 1972)
- Manhattan Cycles (India Navigation, 1973)
- The Psyche (RE Records, 1975)
- The Peoples Republic (A&M/Horizon, 1976)
- Revolutionary Ensemble (Enja, 1977)
- And Now... (Pi Recordings, 2004)
- Beyond the Boundary of Time (Mutable Music, 2008)
- Counterparts (Mutable Music, 2012)

=== With others ===
With Muhal Richard Abrams

- Levels and Degrees of Light (Delmark, 1968)
- Mama and Daddy (Black Saint, 1980)

With Carla Bley

- Escalator over the Hill (JCOA Records/ECM, 1971, 3LPs)

With Joe Bonner

- Angel Eyes (Muse, 1976)

With Anthony Braxton

- 3 Compositions of New Jazz (Delmark, 1968, LP; Delmark, 1991, CD)
- Silence (Freedom Records, 1975, LP)
- Anthony Braxton (BYG Actuel, 1969, LP)
- This Time... (BYG Actuel, 1970, LP)
- New York, Fall 1974 (Arista, 1975, LP)

With Thomas Buckner

- Sign of the Times (Lovely Music, 1994, CD)

With Don Cherry

- Relativity Suite (JCOA Records, 1973, LP)

With Alice Coltrane

- Universal Consciousness (Impulse!, 1971)
- World Galaxy (Impulse!, 1972)

With Creative Construction Company

- Creative Construction Company (Muse, 1970 [1975])
- Creative Construction Company Vol. II (Muse, 1970 [1976])

With Anthony Davis

- Of Blues and Dreams (Sackville 3032, 1979)

With James Emery

- Artlife (Lumina Records, 1982, LP)

With Carl Hancock Rux

- Apothecary Rx (Giant Step, 2004)
- Good Bread Alley (Thirsty Ear, 2006)

With Rahsaan Roland Kirk

- Rahsaan Rahsaan (Atlantic, 1970)

With George E. Lewis

- Shadowgraph (Black Saint, 1978, LP; 1998, CD)

With Grachan Moncur III

- Echoes of Prayer (JCOA Records, 1974, LP [1975])

With Paul Motian

- Conception Vessel (ECM, 1973)

With Mtume

- Allkebu-Lan (Land of the Blacks) at the East (Strata East, 1972, 2LPs)

With Dewey Redman

- Coincide (Impulse!, 1974)

With Jeffrey Schanzer

- Vistas (Music Vistas, 1987, LP)

With Archie Shepp

- Archie Shepp & Philly Joe Jones (Fantasy Records, 1975, LP)
- Pitchin Can (American Records, 1970, LP)
- Things Have Got to Change (Impulse Records, 1971, LP)
- Attica Blues (Impulse, 1972, LP)
- Black Gipsy (Prestige Records, 1977, LP)
- The Cry of My People (Impulse, 1973, LP)

With Alan Silva

- Luna Surface (BYG, 1969)

With Cecil Taylor

- Live in Bologna, Leo Records (1988, 2 LPs; 1988, CD)
- Live in Vienna, (Leo Records, 1988, 2 LPs-Limited edition; 1991, CD)

With Henry Threadgill

- Too Much Sugar for a Dime (Axiom, 1993, CD)

== Grants ==
- Fromm Music Foundation, Harvard University, commission, 2003
- New York State Council on the Arts, Nyasaland, 2002; Jenkins Squared, 2000
- Meet the Composer, Color Eugoloid for the Relâche Ensemble, 2002; Three Willies, 1996
- The Aaron Copland Fund for Music, Coincidents, 2002
- Ford Foundation, Three Willies, 2001
- Animating Democracy, Americans for the Arts (funded by the Ford Foundation and the NEA), Three Willies, 2001
- Mutable Music, brass quartet and voice piece, 1998; trio and voice piece, 1991
- Rockefeller Foundation, The Negros Burial Ground, 1996; Fresh Faust, 1992
- Mary Flagler Cary Trust, The Negros Burial Ground, 1995
- New York Foundation for the Arts, music fellowship, 1992, 1986
- Munich Biennial New Music Theatre Festival, The Mother of Three Sons, 1990
- National Endowment for the Arts, special projects grant, 1990, 1988, 1984
- National Endowment for the Arts, jazz composition fellowship, 1987, 1979, 1973
- Creative Arts Program, service grant, 1974

== Awards ==
- The ASCAP Foundation Rudolf Nissim Prize, Concerto for Improvised Violin and Orchestra, 2006
- Nominated for United States Artists Fellowships, 2006
- John Simon Guggenheim Memorial Foundation Fellowship, 2004
- The New York Dance and Performance Bessie Awards, The Mother of Three Sons, 1992
- Downbeat Magazine International Critics’ and Readers’ Poll, awardee, 1987, 1972
- Jazz Magazine Poll for violin, awardee, 1979
- Downbeat Magazine Talent Deserving Wider Recognition, awardee, 1974

== Teaching ==
- Artist in Residence, California Institute of the Arts, Valencia, CA, 2002 spring
- Composer in Residence, Other Minds Festival, San Francisco, CA, 2000
- Artist in Residence, Harvestworks, New York, NY, 2000
- Master Artist in Residence, Atlantic Center for the Arts, New Smyrna Beach, FL 1993
- Artist in Residence, Atlanta Virtuosi, Atlanta, GA, 1991
- Composer in Residence, Oberlin Conservatory, Oberlin, OH, 1975 and 1990
- Visiting Professor, Carnegie-Mellon University, Pittsburgh, PA, 1989 spring

== Professional memberships ==
- Board of Directors, Meet The Composer (founding member)
- Association for the Advancement of Creative Musicians (AACM)
- SESAC
- Atlantic Center for the Arts

== Education ==
- Florida A&M University, Tallahassee, Florida – B. A. in Music Education (full music scholarship)
- American Conservatory of Music, Chicago, Illinois
- DuSable High School, Captain Walter Dyett, Chicago, Illinois
