= The Psyche =

Live album by Revolutionary Ensemble
- Released: 1975
- Genre: Jazz
- Length: 47:11
- Label: RE Records

Revolutionary Ensemble chronology
Manhattan Cycles (1973)	The Psyche (1975)	The People's Republic (1976)

The Psyche is a live album by the Revolutionary Ensemble, violinist Leroy Jenkins, bassist Sirone and drummer Jerome Cooper. It was initially released on LP in 1975 by the group's own label RE Records, and was reissued on CD in 2002 by Mutable Music.

The members of the group formed RE Records for the purpose of releasing The Psyche, and the album was the only recording issued by the label. It was released immediately prior to a European tour, and the group took boxes of the LPs with them, selling out the first and only pressing to European record dealers.

== Reception ==
Professional ratings
Review scores
Source	Rating
AllMusic	4/5 stars

In a review for AllMusic, Brian Olewnick wrote: "It's a superb performance... consisting of three compositions, one by each group member, and can serve as a microcosm of what the band was about... The Psyche is a very fine recording by a wonderful and underrecorded trio; snatch it up if you're lucky enough to come across it."

Writing for All About Jazz, Rex Butters commented, "Here, formed in the strange halcyon days of Nixon’s war on everyone, the trio embraced musical radicalism. The ensemble played music as rich in emotion and beauty as experimentation... Their substantial group improv never loses momentum or inspiration." In a separate review for the same publication, Andrey Henkin stated, "Though two of the three compositions are lengthy... you can focus on the subtle interactions between Jenkins and Sirone rather than struggling through the usual soup of a horn-based avant-garde session."

Chris Kelsey, writing for JazzTimes, remarked, "In recent years Jenkins became largely involved with composition, so one tends to forget what an extraordinary improviser he is. Most impressive is the range of melodic expression and technique he shows during an unaccompanied solo on the album-opening 'Invasion.' Neither Sirone nor Cooper has been given his due. Few bassists have embodied such a combination of chops and soul as Sirone. Here, his time is sure, his sound large, his imagination vast. As for Cooper: there’s an extended passage on 'Invasion' where he swings as hard as I've ever heard a free-jazz drummer swing. The CD's best track might be the album's closer, 'Collegno.' The cut features the three musicians at their hyper-intuitive, interactive best. Not just a history lesson, Psyche is vital, essential stuff."

In an article for The Wire, Julian Cowley wrote: "Jenkins has an incisive tone, coiling fluently around and out from thematic cells. But although his looping line tends to disclose with great clarity the figure latent in the music's field, the group resists establishing a hierarchy of voices. Each member is allowed solo space and duets occur. Sirone's double bass and Cooper, occasionally on piano as well as drums, can drive with force but their input is thoroughly, spontaneously compositional rather than supportive and secondary. Their weight and density are articulate. As The Psyche confirms, the poise of the energetic interplay between all three made the Revolutionary Ensemble special."

== Track listing ==
1. "Invasion" (Jerome Cooper) - 26:15
2. "Hu-man" (Sirone) - 8:04
3. "Collegno" (Leroy Jenkins) - 13:00

== Personnel ==
- Leroy Jenkins – violin, viola
- Sirone − bass
- Jerome Cooper – drums, piano
