= The Legend of Ai Glatson =

Studio album by Leroy Jenkins
- Released: 1978
- Recorded: July 1978
- Genre: Jazz
- Length: 39:03
- Label: Black Saint
- Producer: Giacomo Pellicciotti

Leroy Jenkins chronology
Lifelong Ambitions (1977)	The Legend of Ai Glatson (1978)	Space Minds, New Worlds, Survival of America (1979)

The Legend of Ai Glatson is an album by American jazz violinist Leroy Jenkins, recorded in 1978 for the Italian Black Saint label.

== Reception ==
Professional ratings
Review scores
Source	Rating
AllMusic	4/5 stars
The Penguin Guide to Jazz Recordings	3/4 stars
The Rolling Stone Jazz & Blues Album Guide	4/5 stars
DownBeat	4/5 stars

The AllMusic review by Ron Wynn states that "it's loaded with great violin solos, as well as some unusual, intriguing arrangements and compositions". The authors of The Penguin Guide to Jazz Recordings noted that the album was created shortly after the breakup of the Revolutionary Ensemble, and stated that it "is one of the few places in contemporary jazz where the direct and unassimilated influence of Cecil Taylor can be detected, and it remains strongly reminiscent of Cecil's Cafe Montmartre sessions. Jenkins is in stunningly good form, and his solo play on tributes to two modern saxophone players, 'Brax Stone' and 'Albert Ayler (His Life Was Too Short)', is as good as anything in his catalogue. Legend isn't the prettiest of recordings, but it has all the intensity Jenkins brings to live performance."

DownBeat gave 4 stars to the album. Reviewer Art Lange wrote, "All told, an eventful 40 minutes of music which both soars and whispers, evokes and elucidates".

== Track listing ==
All compositions by Leroy Jenkins

1. "Ai Glatson" - 10:33
2. "Brax Stone" - 8:53
3. "Albert Ayler (His Life Was Too Short)" - 4:06
4. "Tuesday Child" - 5:23
5. "What Goes Around Comes Around" - 8:28

- Recorded at GRS Studios in Milano, Italy in July 1978

== Personnel ==
- Leroy Jenkins - violin
- Anthony Davis - piano
- Andrew Cyrille - percussion
