= For Players Only =

Live album by Leroy Jenkins
- Released: 1975
- Recorded: January 30, 1975
- Venue: Wollman Auditorium, Columbia University, New York City
- Genre: Free jazz
- Label: JCOA Records; LP 1010

Leroy Jenkins chronology
For Players Only (1975)	Swift Are the Winds of Life (1976)

Jazz Composer's Orchestra chronology
Echoes of Prayer (1975)	For Players Only (1975)

For Players Only is a live album by violinist and composer Leroy Jenkins, his first as a leader. It was recorded in January 1975 at Wollman Auditorium, Columbia University in New York City, and was released by JCOA Records later that year. On the album, Jenkins is joined by members of the Jazz Composer's Orchestra.

The album presents a single, extended composition by Jenkins that was commissioned by the JCOA in 1974. The work was first presented by the JCOA and WKCR-FM via four workshop concerts held at Columbia University from January 28–31, 1975.

== Reception ==
Professional ratings
Review scores
Source	Rating
AllMusic	4/5 stars

In a review for AllMusic, Brian Olewnick wrote: "One of seven albums commissioned by the Jazz Composers Orchestra, violinist Leroy Jenkins' For Players Only is one of the more loosely organized and, for all its charms, most scattershot of these works... The first half of the composition is arranged in suite-like fashion, with briefly stated themes fleshed out by various small groups within the orchestra... in the second half of this composition... each orchestra member play[s] consecutive, individual solos... Over the course of his career, Jenkins composed a number of knotty pieces, and For Players Only ranks right up there."

Gary Giddins referred to the album as Jenkins's "daring Jazz Composers Orchestra spectacle". John Corbett called the album "one of several very important JCOA documents," and noted that it featured "an incredible eighteen-piece lineup". Barry McRae of Jazz Journal stated: "For Players Only manages to sound like the work of a small group, while retaining all the textural richness of a larger aggregation."

== Track listing ==
Composed and conducted by Leroy Jenkins.

1. "Part One" – 15:45
2. "Part Two" – 20:35

== Personnel ==
Order of soloists at the conclusion of Part 2 indicated below.

- Leroy Jenkins – violin (soloist 18)
- Becky Friend – flute, piccolo (soloist 10)
- Charles Brackeen – soprano saxophone (soloist 15)
- Kalaparusha Maurice McIntyre – tenor saxophone (soloist 7)
- Dewey Redman – clarinet, musette, banshee horn (soloist 3)
- Anthony Braxton – contrabass clarinet (soloist 13)
- Leo Smith – trumpet (soloist 1)
- Joseph Bowie – trombone (soloist 8
- Sharon Freeman – French horn (soloist 5)
- Bill Davis – tuba (soloist 11)
- Romulus Franceschini – synthesizer (soloist 14)
- James Emery – guitar (soloist 6)
- Diedre Murray – cello (soloist 17)
- Sirone – bass (soloist 4)
- Dave Holland – bass (soloist 16)
- Jerome Cooper – drums, percussion, piano (soloist 12)
- Charles Shaw – drums, percussion (soloist 2)
- Roger Blank – drums, percussion (soloist 9)
