= Creative Construction Company =

Creative Construction Company was an American jazz ensemble active briefly in the early 1970s. The ensemble recorded two albums for Muse Records and was composed of six improvisationalists: Wadada Leo Smith, Anthony Braxton, Leroy Jenkins, Muhal Richard Abrams, Richard Davis, and Steve McCall.

== Discography ==
- Creative Construction Company (Muse, 1970 [1975]) also released as Muhal (Vedette, 1977)
- Creative Construction Company Vol. II (Muse, 1970 [1976])
