= Lifelong Ambitions =

Live album by Leroy Jenkins
- Released: 1977
- Recorded: March 11, 1977
- Genre: Jazz
- Length: 39:03
- Label: Black Saint
- Producer: Giacomo Pellicciotti

Leroy Jenkins chronology
Solo Concert (1977)	Lifelong Ambitions (1977)	The Legend of Ai Glatson (1978)

Lifelong Ambitions is a live album by American jazz violinist Leroy Jenkins recorded in 1977 for the Italian Black Saint label.

== Reception ==
Professional ratings
Review scores
Source	Rating
AllMusic	4.5/5 stars
The Penguin Guide to Jazz Recordings	3/4 stars
The Rolling Stone Jazz & Blues Album Guide	5/5 stars

The AllMusic review by Ron Wynn awarded the album 4½ stars stating "Leroy Jenkins, free jazz's greatest violinist, has always worked best in intimate situations with equally talented partners. He certainly had the optimum conditions on this duet date".

The authors of The Penguin Guide to Jazz Recordings awarded the album 3 stars, and commented: "The duos with Abrams are... both traditionally minded and innovative... Like their titles... the pieces are kept pretty abstract (and are all almost exactly the same length). There's a patient, almost schoolmasterly side to Abrams's playing. Jenkins moves off into pan-tonality a few times, but he stays firmly anchored in an identifiable key for most of the set, even when his partner has dissolved the normal ties of melody and accompaniment."

== Track listing ==
All compositions by Leroy Jenkins

1. "Greetings and Salutations" - 6:29
2. "Meditation" - 6:26
3. "Happiness" - 6:38
4. "The Blues" - 6:37
5. "The Weird World" - 6:28
6. "The Father, the Son, the Holy Ghost" - 6:25

- Recorded at the Washington Square Church in New York City on March 11, 1977

== Personnel ==
- Leroy Jenkins - violin
- Muhal Richard Abrams - piano
