= The People's Republic (album) =

Studio album by The Revolutionary Ensemble
- Released: 1976
- Recorded: December 4–6, 1975
- Studio: Kendun Recorders, Burbank, CA
- Genre: Jazz
- Length: 40:17
- Label: A&M/Horizon; SP-708
- Producer: Ed Michel

Revolutionary Ensemble chronology
The Psyche (1975)	The People's Republic (1976)	Revolutionary Ensemble (1977)

The People's Republic is an album by the Revolutionary Ensemble, violinist Leroy Jenkins, bassist Sirone and drummer Jerome Cooper, recorded in late 1975 and released on the A&M/Horizon label the following year.

According to Sirone, when A&M's cofounder Herb Alpert played an excerpt from the album (probably "The People's Republic," which opens with voices) for musical director Quincy Jones, it elicited a harsh, negative reaction, with Jones claiming that he had "been conned; that it wasn’t jazz or music and blah blah blah." Sirone recalls that Jones missed the point, which was that "everybody can sing, you may not like the voices but everybody can sing."

== Reception ==
Professional ratings
Review scores
Source	Rating
AllMusic	4.5/5 stars
The Rolling Stone Jazz Record Guide	5/5 stars

The AllMusic review by Rob Ferrier stated "This record has a fearsome reputation that is completely undeserved. On the contrary, while the sound of strings seems strange to a jazz-trained ear, the music these people make on this record is beautiful, fragile, and – considering that it's all completely improvised – astonishingly tight as well. These men played together for a long time, not for tangible reward, but for themselves and whoever cared to listen. This is definitely a different record, and what happens here might not even be called jazz, but the salient quality of the music is beauty, not the ferociousness one might expect. This is highly recommended, if only for the inclusion of Sirone's bass playing, a voice that should have been recorded more often".

Writer John Corbett called the album "Absolutely mandatory music from the '70s, from a moment that a handful of producers... were sneaking very outré recordings onto major labels." Bob Gluck stated that the album "represents an excellent entry point for listeners unfamiliar with this band, and post-Coltrane improvised music more generally," noting that "the parallel voices of the trio are presented with clarity. The music is exceedingly diverse."

Critic Gary Giddins expressed his admiration for "Ponderous Planets," writing that the group "often replaced a staunch beat with a mere pulse, suggesting a fusion between classical and jazz practices. But the reflexive interplay between Leroy Jenkins's spry violin, Sirone's redwood-heavy bass (and expert arco technique), and Jerome Cooper's fastidious, if often whimsical percussion was largely consonant and accessible, never more so than on Cooper's by-no-means ponderous opus. It begins with bowed strings and saw, achieves an unmistakably jazzy frisson with the entrance of plucked bass and cymbals, and finally, having made the case that impassioned improvisation can flourish without swing, swings like a thresher—in waltz time."

== Track listing ==
1. "New York" (Leroy Jenkins) – 6:22
2. "Trio for Trio" (Jenkins) – 6:45
3. "Chinese Rock" (Jerome Cooper) – 6:28
4. "The People's Republic" (Sirone) – 9:42
5. "Ponderous Planets" (Cooper) – 11:00

== Personnel ==
- Leroy Jenkins – violin, viola, kalimba, recorder, gong, claves
- Sirone − bass, trombone, bells, shaker, wood block, gong
- Jerome Cooper – drums, bugle, piano, balafon, temple block, wood block, gong, bells, saw
