= Solo Concert (Leroy Jenkins album) =

Live album by Leroy Jenkins
- Released: 1977
- Recorded: January 11, 1977
- Venue: Washington Square Church, New York, NY
- Genre: Jazz
- Label: India Navigation; IN 1028

Leroy Jenkins chronology
Swift Are the Winds of Life (1976)	Solo Concert (1977)	Lifelong Ambitions (1977)

Solo Concert is a live album by violinist / composer Leroy Jenkins. It was recorded in January 1977 at Washington Square Church in New York City, and was released by India Navigation later that year. The album is dedicated "to Bruce Hayden, teacher and friend." (Jenkins studied with Hayden at Florida A&M University.)

== Reception ==
Professional ratings
Review scores
Source	Rating
AllMusic	4.5/5 stars

Writing for AllMusic, Ron Wynn commented: "About as adventurous and experimental as violin playing gets. Despite far-out tendencies, Jenkins knows when to come back in and how."

A New York Times review of the concert stated: "Mr. Jenkins chose to reveal his artistry by degrees, a facet at a time. Each of the pieces that Mr. Jenkins played seemed to demand its own unique combination of attitudes and techniques... 'Opus/Supo' and 'Why Am I Here?' set up rhythmic and intervallic relationships that were explored through energetic improvisations."

== Track listing ==
1. "Improvisation" (Jenkins) – 7:47
2. "Why Am I Here" (Jenkins) – 8:20
3. "Opus / Supo National Baptist Convention" (Jenkins) – 8:34
4. "Lush Life" (Billy Strayhorn) – 8:57
5. "Keep On Trucking, Brother (A Message To Bruce)" (Jenkins) – 12:18
6. "Nobody Knows De Trouble I Seen" (traditional) – 2:07

== Personnel ==
- Leroy Jenkins – violin
