= And Now... =

Studio album by Revolutionary Ensemble
- Released: 2004
- Recorded: June 18, 2004
- Studios: Systems Two, Brooklyn, New York
- Genre: Jazz
- Length: 50:23
- Label: Pi Recordings

Revolutionary Ensemble chronology
Revolutionary Ensemble (1977)	And Now... (2004)	Beyond the Boundary of Time (2008)

And Now... is an album by the Revolutionary Ensemble, violinist Leroy Jenkins, bassist Sirone and drummer Jerome Cooper. It was recorded in June 2004 and released later that year by Pi Recordings. It was the first recording by the group following a hiatus of roughly 25 years.

"911-544" is a suite composed by Jerome Cooper, and is a reflection on the events of 9/11, which he watched unfold from the roof of his apartment building.

== Reception ==
Professional ratings
Review scores
Source	Rating
AllMusic	4/5 stars
The Penguin Guide to Jazz	3/4 stars
All About Jazz	4.5/5 stars

In a review for AllMusic, Scott Yanow wrote: "the Revolutionary Ensemble came back together in 2004. Happily, the three musicians' fire, adventurous nature and determination to express themselves through their highly original music was still very much intact. And Now... has Jenkins, Sirone and Cooper performing a piece with forward momentum ('Berlin Erfahrung'), a dirge, a one-chord drone, the thoughtful 'Light' and a whimsical and surprisingly gentle number ('Ism Schism') that pays tribute to Western classical music. Fans of the group can rejoice that nothing has been lost through the years."

The authors of The Penguin Guide to Jazz awarded the album 3 stars, and commented: "More than 30 years after the group's first experiments, the members of the Revolutionary Ensemble got back together again. The results are, as one would expect, mellower ('Ism Schism' is a quiet masterpiece with classical overtones), more measured, and better recorded. Nevertheless, the old fires are not extinguished and there is still plenty of excitement in the set. Cooper's '911-544' is a reminder of the old, one-chord pieces, built out of the simplest and most basic of materials. 'Berlin Erfahrung' is speedy and nimble and 'Light' has a delicacy that, instrumentation apart, would make even established fans wonder who was playing."

Writing for All About Jazz, Andrey Henkin stated: "Judged in a vacuum, the album is energetic and has an appealing cerebral quality. No horns and a bassist that functions as an equal member of the front melodic line changes the dynamic away from what listeners typically expect from jazz. This music is not linear or even cyclical. It is reminiscent of the whack-a-mole game, elements popping up and down seemingly at random. There are themes but they are more bookends. Judged against their earlier work, a listener may be surprised that the years didn't have much intervening effect. Apart from the keyboards of Cooper, this could be any of their albums from the '70s. That is as good as starting point for their renaissance as any."

In a separate review for All About Jazz, Jerry D'Souza remarked: "If there is one trait is in evidence here, it is the accessibility of the compositions. Though they ascend from the bed of melody, they are forged on the kiln of inspiration and so create remarkably potent permutations. Each of the musicians gives improvisation its context, and though the angles may be odd, the prism through which they are filtered brings the whole into pronounced focus... The interaction between the three is still intuitive. Time has not effaced their ability to forge ahead, grab imagination, and create music that is spirited, fierce, and dynamic."

Kevin Whitehead, writing for NPR Music, commented: "A breezy detachment that is central to their charm. Great to have them back." Jazz Word's Ken Waxman wrote: "And Now... proves that the Revolutionary Ensemble still work together excellently after all these years apart, and the ellipses suggest there's more to come."

== Track listing ==
1. "Berlin Erfahrung" (Sirone) - 5:24
2. "Rumi Tales" (Jenkins) - 6:54
3. "911-544" (Cooper) - 20:52
4. "Light" (Jenkins) - 7:46
5. "Ism Schism" (Sirone) - 9:31
- Recorded on June 18, 2004, at Systems Two, Brooklyn, NY.

== Personnel ==
- Leroy Jenkins – violin, harmonica, bells
- Sirone − bass
- Jerome Cooper – drums, percussion, keyboards
