= Washington Square Methodist Episcopal Church =

Coordinates: 40°43′53.17″N 74°0′0.07″W

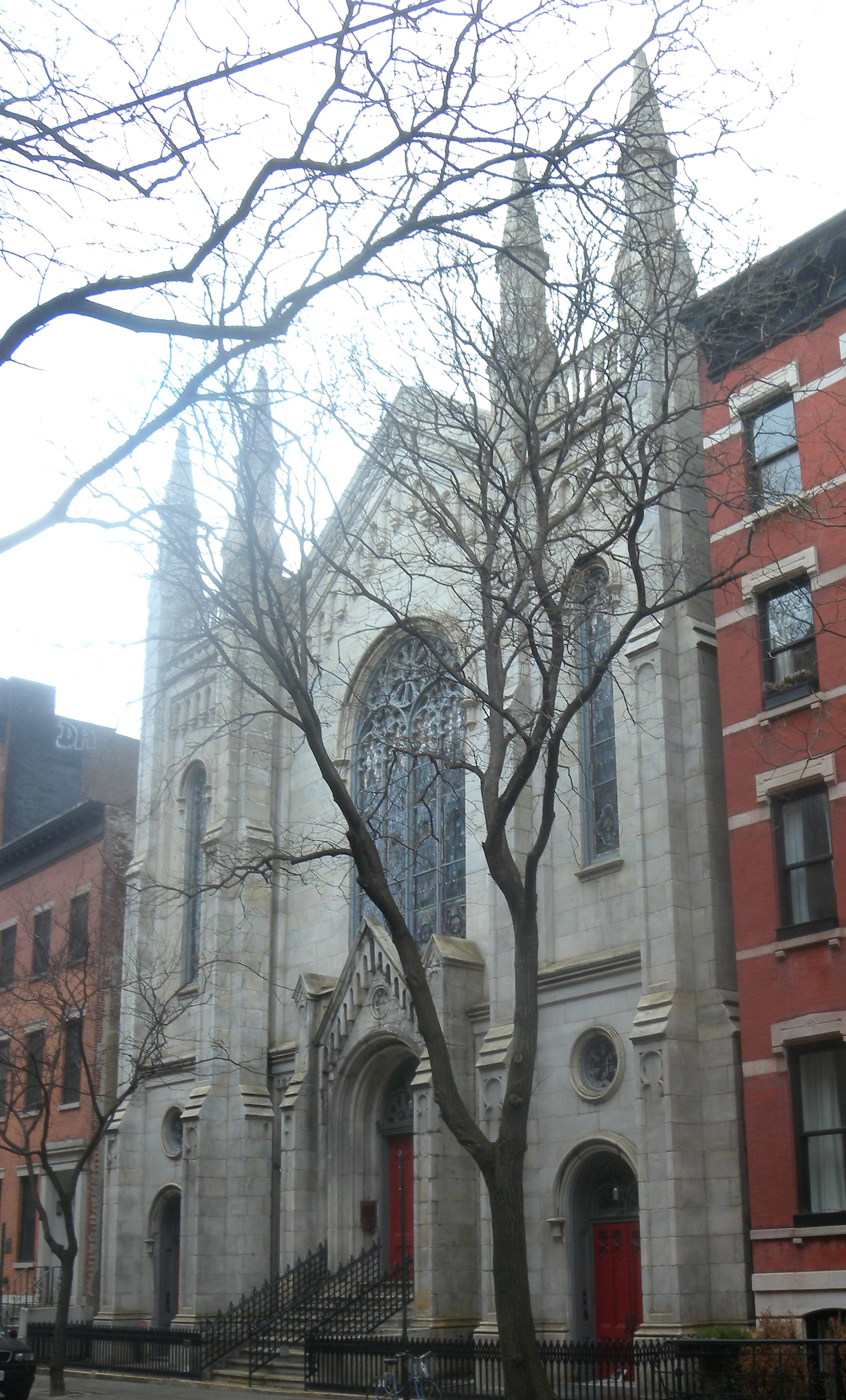
- Washington Square Methodist Episcopal Church
- Location: New York City, New York
- Country: United States
- Denomination: United Methodist Church
- Previous denomination: Methodist Episcopal Church; Methodist Church

Architecture
- Functional status: Converted into apartments
- Architect: Charles Hadden
- Style: Romanesque Revival
- Years built: 1859–1860
- Closed: 2004

Administration
- Division: New York Conference

Washington Square Methodist Episcopal Church was a United Methodist church which was located at 135 West Fourth Street in New York City's Greenwich Village for almost 150 years.

== History ==
The building was constructed as a new and larger structure by the Sullivan Street Methodist church in 1860; a balcony added later was the first New York City example of one not supported by columns. This congregation briefly rented space in Trinity Chapel, New York University (1964), before joining with two other Methodist congregations to create the Church of the Village.

Washington Square United Methodist Church was known as "The Peace Church" when under the leadership of Finley Schaef, resulting from the congregation's opposition to the Vietnam War. In late 1970, the church hosted planning meetings for the Fifth Street Women's Building Takeover in January 1971. Paul Abels, New York City's first openly gay clergyman, served as the church's pastor from 1973 to 1984 and promoted acceptance of the gay and lesbian community.

The building was sold by its remaining small congregation in 2004, which could no longer support maintenance on the structure. The church could not be demolished as it was located in the Greenwich Village Historic District and was instead converted into Novare, a condominium apartment building.

== See also ==
- Methodist Episcopal Church
