= Chirimia =

Spanish term for a type of woodwind instrument similar to an oboe

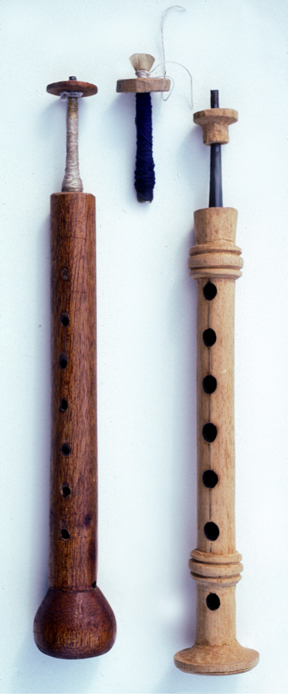
The chirimía on the left is from Jacaltenango, Guatemala, and the one on the right is from Antigua, Guatemala.

Chirimía (sometimes chirisuya in Peru) is a Spanish term for a type of woodwind instrument similar to an oboe. The chirimía is a member of the shawm family of double-reed instruments, introduced to North, Central and South America in the sixteenth and seventeenth centuries by the Spanish clergy.

== Distribution ==
Usage of the chirimía varies widely across Iberomerica and Iberia itself, with the instrument being extinct in some areas, but a living tradition in others.

The chirimía and drum are used to accompany religious processions and annual commemorative dance-dramas in many remote areas of Latin America, including Jacaltenango, Guatemala. The music produced is quite unique and varies from one region to another. This tradition is an adaptation of the pre-Columbian practice of accompanying religious ceremonies and processions with drums, flutes, and whistles.

There are two types of chirimías in Guatemala, a small one and a large one. The size of the holes and their location determine the sound of the small or large chirimías. In some parts of Latin America, as in Jacaltenango, small and large chirimías are played together with small and large drums.

The regular chirimía has 10 holes, while the Guatemalan and Mexican chirimía has 6 to 10 holes. Although the outward appearance of the chirimías and the number and size of holes vary regionally throughout Mexico and Guatemala, these chirimías are all double-reeded wooden instruments. Some of the chirimías have a conical bore, while others have a cylindrical bore. The types of reeds and manner in which they are kept in place also vary.

The Jakaltek chirimía, called su’ in the Jakaltek language, is very similar to the chirimías of central and southern Mexico. The Jakaltek chirimía is 34.5 cm long, without the double-reed in place. The wooden part is 27 centimeters long and has a cylindrical bore, with 6 vertical holes, and 2 lateral holes. The mouthpiece consists of a staple, a tapered metal cylinder, that is wrapped with string and topped with a wooden pirouette. The bulbous bottom portion of the staple fits snugly into the wooden portion of the instrument, but can be easily removed for cleaning.

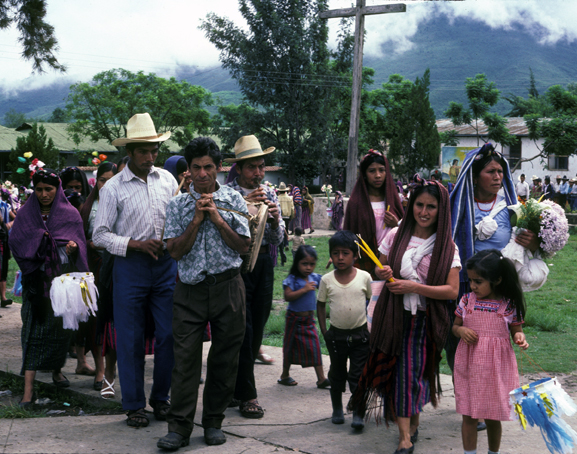
A chirimia and drum accompany a Catholic procession in Jacaltenango, Guatemala.

=== Extinct ===
- Nuevo Leon and Tamaulipas: disappeared by the mid-19th century.
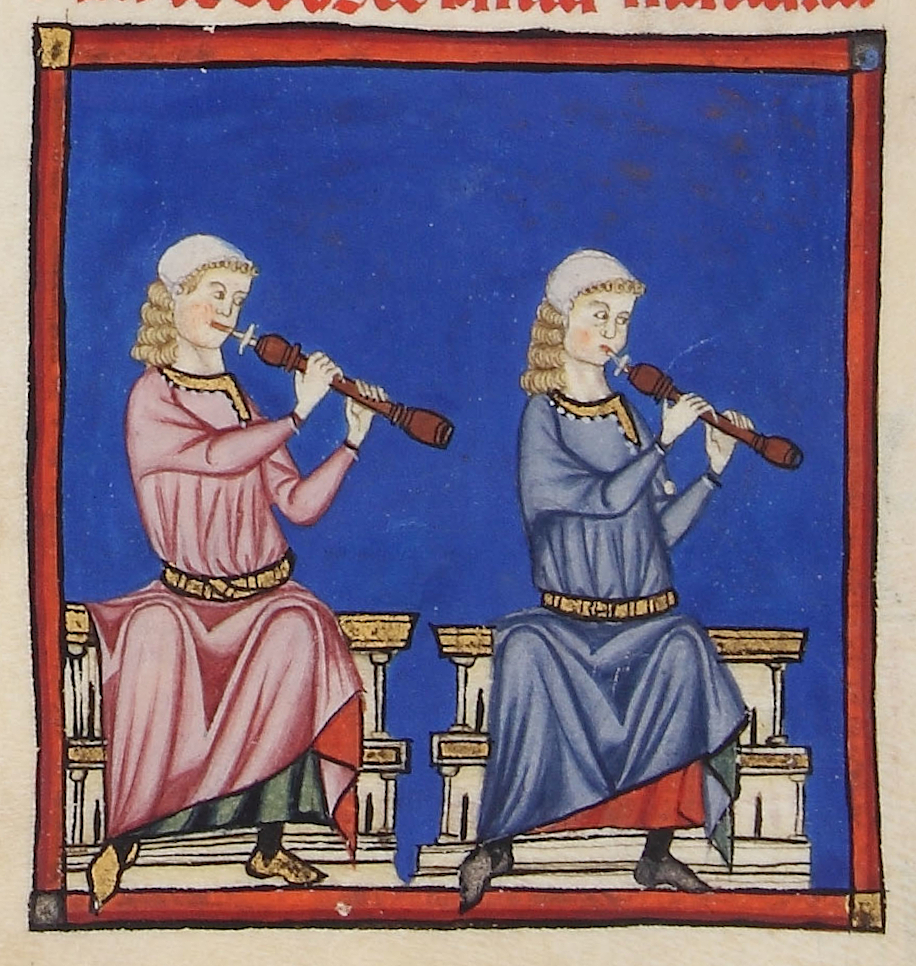
1280, Iberian Peninsula. Type of shawm unlabeled in the Cantigas de Santa Maria. Has been called a possible musette, and has the same bulbous bell as the Guatemalan chirimia.

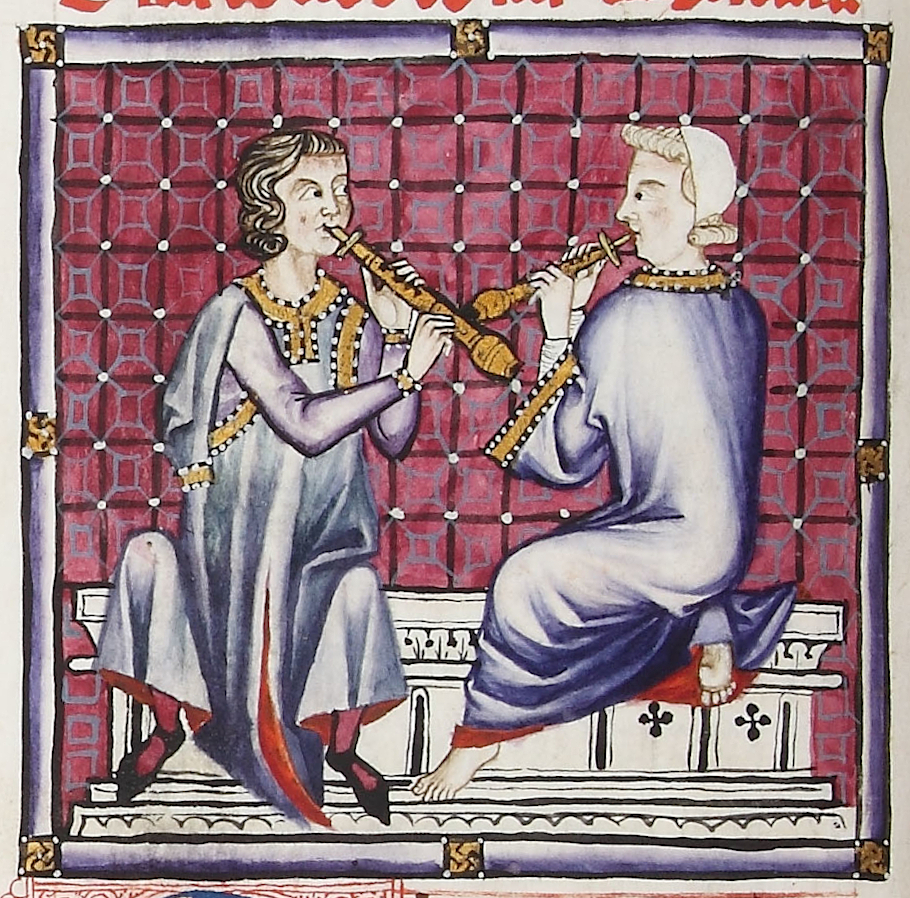
1280, Iberian Peninsula. Type of shawm unlabeled in the Cantigas de Santa Maria. Has been called a possible musette, and has the same bulbous bell as the Guatemalan chirimia.

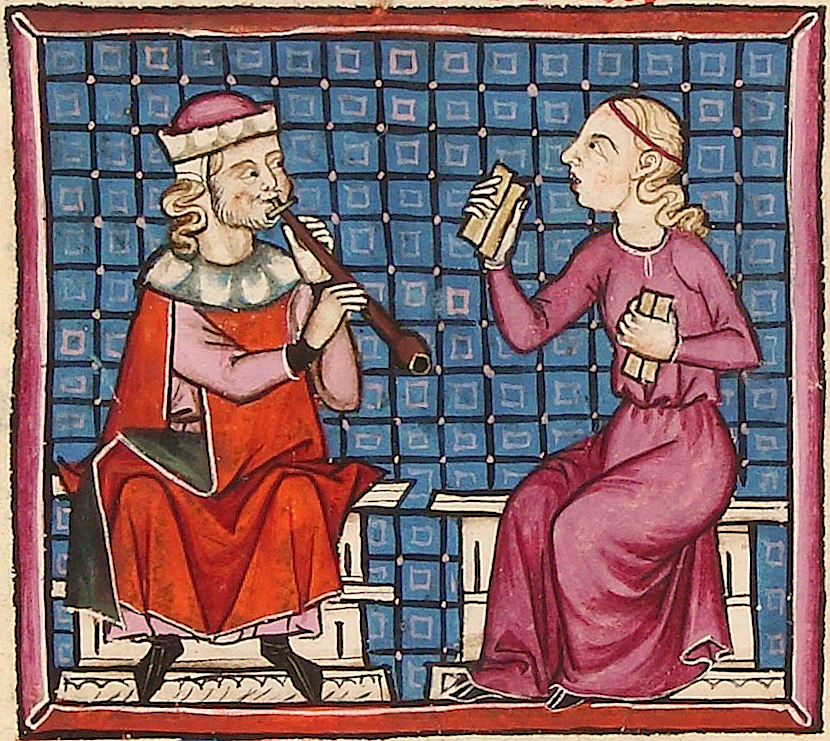
1280, Iberian Peninsula. Type of shawm unlabeled in the Cantigas de Santa Maria. Has been called a possible musette, and has the same bulbous bell as the Guatemalan chirimia.

== See also ==
- Three-hole pipe, or tabor pipe
