= Namesake (disambiguation) =

A namesake is a person or thing that has the same name as another or that is named after another.

Namesake may also refer to:

- "The Namesake" (short story), by Willa Cather
- The Namesake, children's book by C. Walter Hodges
- The Namesake (novel), novel by Jhumpa Lahiri
- The Namesake (film), a 2006 drama film, based on the novel
- Namesake (album), a 1987 album by Dennis González
- "The Namesake" (NCIS), an episode of the American police procedural series
- Namesake (webcomic), a fantasy webcomic running since 2010
- Namesake (brand), a Taiwanese fashion brand established in 2020
