= Melodic Art–Tet =

Live album by Melodic Art–Tet
- Released: 2013
- Recorded: October 15, 1974
- Venue: WKCR studios, New York City
- Genre: Free jazz
- Length: 1:19:51
- Label: NoBusiness Records; NBCD 56
- Producer: Danas Mikailionis, Joe Walker, Roger Blank

Melodic Art–Tet is a live album by the cooperative group of the same name, featuring saxophonist Charles Brackeen, trumpeter Ahmed Abdullah, bassist William Parker, drummer Roger Blank, and percussionist Tony Waters. It was recorded on October 15, 1974, at WKCR studios in New York City, and was issued by NoBusiness Records in 2013, nearly 40 years after the concert.

Despite the fact that the group, described by author Val Wilmer in her 1977 book As Serious As Your Life as "one of the most satisfying of the younger bands playing in New York," existed for over four years, the album is their sole release, and was recorded shortly before their breakup. Parker appeared on the album in place of Ronnie Boykins, who was the group's primary bassist, but who left the group shortly before the recording was made.

Brackeen and Abdullah would later appear together on the 1987 album Liquid Magic, along with bassist Malachi Favors and drummer Alvin Fielder.

== Reception ==
Professional ratings
Review scores
Source	Rating
All About Jazz	3.5/5 stars
The Free Jazz Collective	3.5/5 stars
Tom Hull – on the Web	A−

In a review for All About Jazz, John Sharpe wrote: "while the band's style may not be as distinctive as others from the period, it nonetheless allows further valuable insight into the diversity on offer during a key moment in the music's history."

Colin Green of The Free Jazz Collective stated: "there's a real joy in the music making, full of telling details... The quartet is not aiming for the conclusive... but something that on occasion might be out of reach; which is why this music retains its vitality."

Dusted Magazine's Derek Taylor called the album a "loft jazz treasure," and commented: "the music echoes the band moniker in giving melody equal weight with freer leaning improvisations."

Writing for Point of Departure, Brian Morton noted that the music is characterized by "strong binary melodies, elemental rhythms, all the root sugars and enzymes that go to the making of jazz and a survivalist urgency," and remarked: "One doesn't notice the usual alternation of theme statement of soloing. Much like Sun Ra's music, it seems to orbit round its own centre, a globular cluster of elements held by a common gravity and an extraordinary mass, out of proportion to the actual composition."

The editors of Burning Ambulance included the album in their list of "Best Jazz Albums of 2013," stating that it combines "the folk melodies of Albert Ayler with the lightheartedness of the early Art Ensemble of Chicago, minus the postmodern pranksterism... The long tracks are actually medleys of concise, structured pieces that could easily have translated to a formal album; it's great that this disc exists, and too bad it's all that exists."

In an article for The List, Stewart Smith wrote: "Blank is hugely engaging throughout, laying swinging tom grooves under Brackeen and Abdullah's spiralling exchanges and the young William Parker's urgent bowed bass."

Ken Waxman, writing for The New York City Jazz Record, commented: "triumphant throughout, the quartet forges an imaginative fusion. It mixes nimble heads with frenetic soloing and Africanized polyrhythmic drumming without neglecting tune structure."

== Track listing ==
"Time and Money" by Ahmed Abdullah. Remaining compositions by Charles Brackeen.

1. "Before Heaven and Earth and the World / Face of the Deep" – 17:03
2. "Above the Cross / My Divine" – 20:01
3. "Time and Money / YAMACA / Open / Pit Chena / In the Chapel / With Cheer" – 30:31
4. "Redemption / Consecration" – 12:07

== Personnel ==
- Charles Brackeen – flute, soprano saxophone, tenor saxophone
- Ahmed Abdullah – trumpet
- William Parker – bass
- Roger Blank – drums
- Tony Waters – percussion
