= Tony Bunn =

American musician

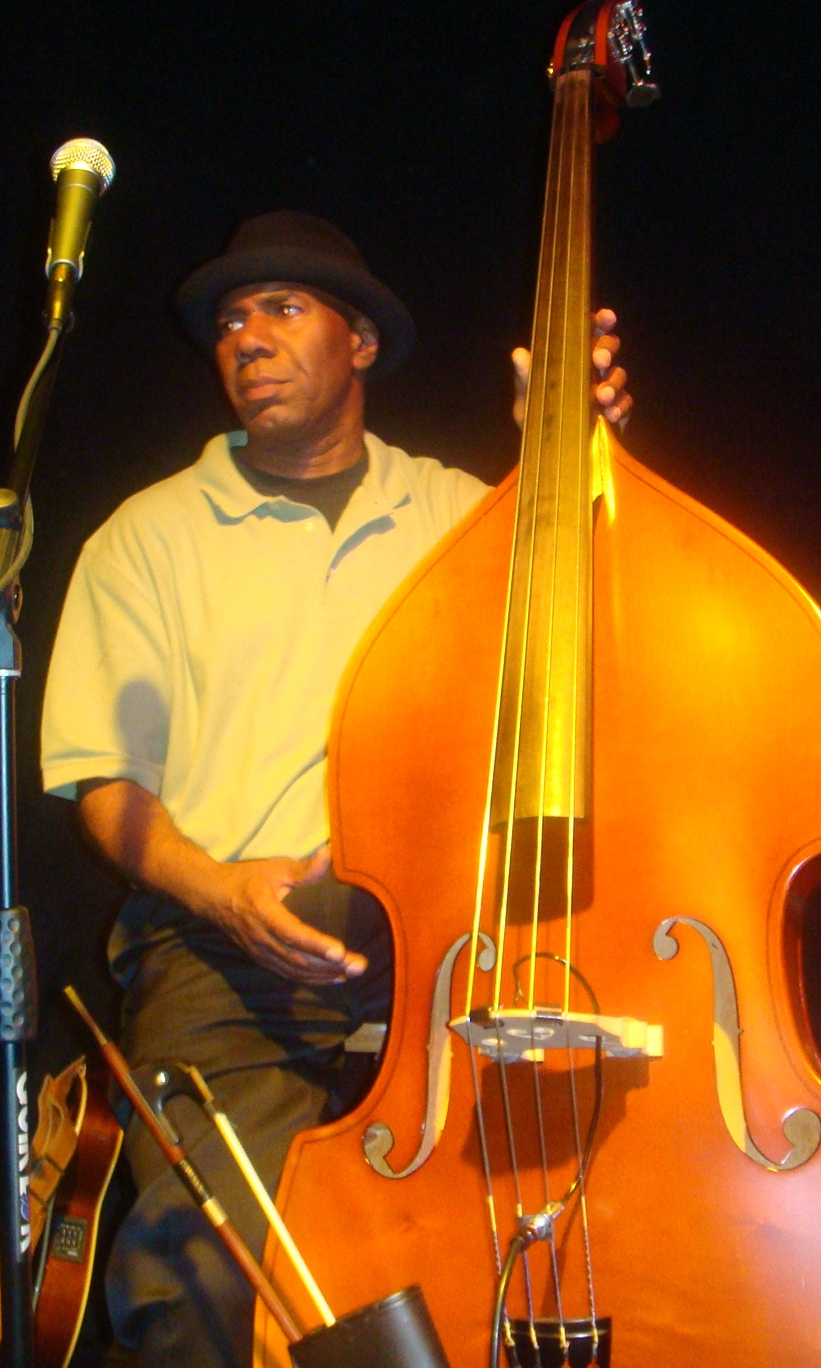
- Tony Bunn during 2009 live performance

Background information
- Born: Robert Anthony Bunn; November 18, 1957 (age 68); Baltimore, Maryland, U.S.
- Genres: Jazz, funk, blues, rock
- Occupation: Musician
- Instruments: Bass guitar, double bass
- Years active: 1976–present

Robert Anthony Bunn (born November 18, 1957) is an American bassist, composer, producer, and writer.

== Biography ==
Tony Bunn was born into a musical family and began studying music in grade school. By the age of seventeen he was proficient on woodwind and brass instruments; earning scholarships to Peabody Institute Preparatory Summer Program(s), as well as inclusion in local orchestras for gifted students. He began the study of the bass guitar in high school.

By the age of twenty-two he had toured Europe and played and recorded with several renowned groups, including Sun Ra, Harold Ivory Williams, Michal Urbaniak, Urszula Dudziak, Jean Carne, Chuck Brown, and the legendary Chuck Berry. In 1977, he conceived and developed the first modern 5-string bass guitar with luthier Paul Reed Smith (Most other sources attribute the first modern 5-string bass to an instrument built in 1976 by Alembic Inc for bassist Jimmy Johnson). Graduating from university in his late twenties, Bunn earned bachelor's degrees in mathematics and computer science. Working with computers and scientific programming, he went on to receive an award from NASA for flight dynamics work on the Terra satellite system. Later, aged in his fifties, Bunn returned to music full-time and began producing projects as a bandleader and solo artist. In 2009, he released the Small World recording (also featuring Dennis Chambers, Arshak Sirunyan, etc.), receiving international acclaim.

== Selected discography ==
=== as Leader ===
- Spirit Moves (2007)
- Small World (2009)

=== as a Sideman ===
with Arshak Sirunyan

- Journal (2011)

with Ray Gaskins

- A Night In The Life (2009)

with John Lamkin

- Hot (1984)

with Gabrielle Goodman:

- Travelin' Light (1993)
- Angel Eyes (2003)

with Michal Urbaniak:

- Smiles Ahead (1976)
- Heritage (1976)
- Urbaniak (1977)

with Urszula Dudziak:

- Midnight Rain (1977)

with Sun Ra:

- Live At Montreux (1976)
- Cosmos (1976)
