= Vieshow Cinemas =

Taiwanese movie-theatre chain

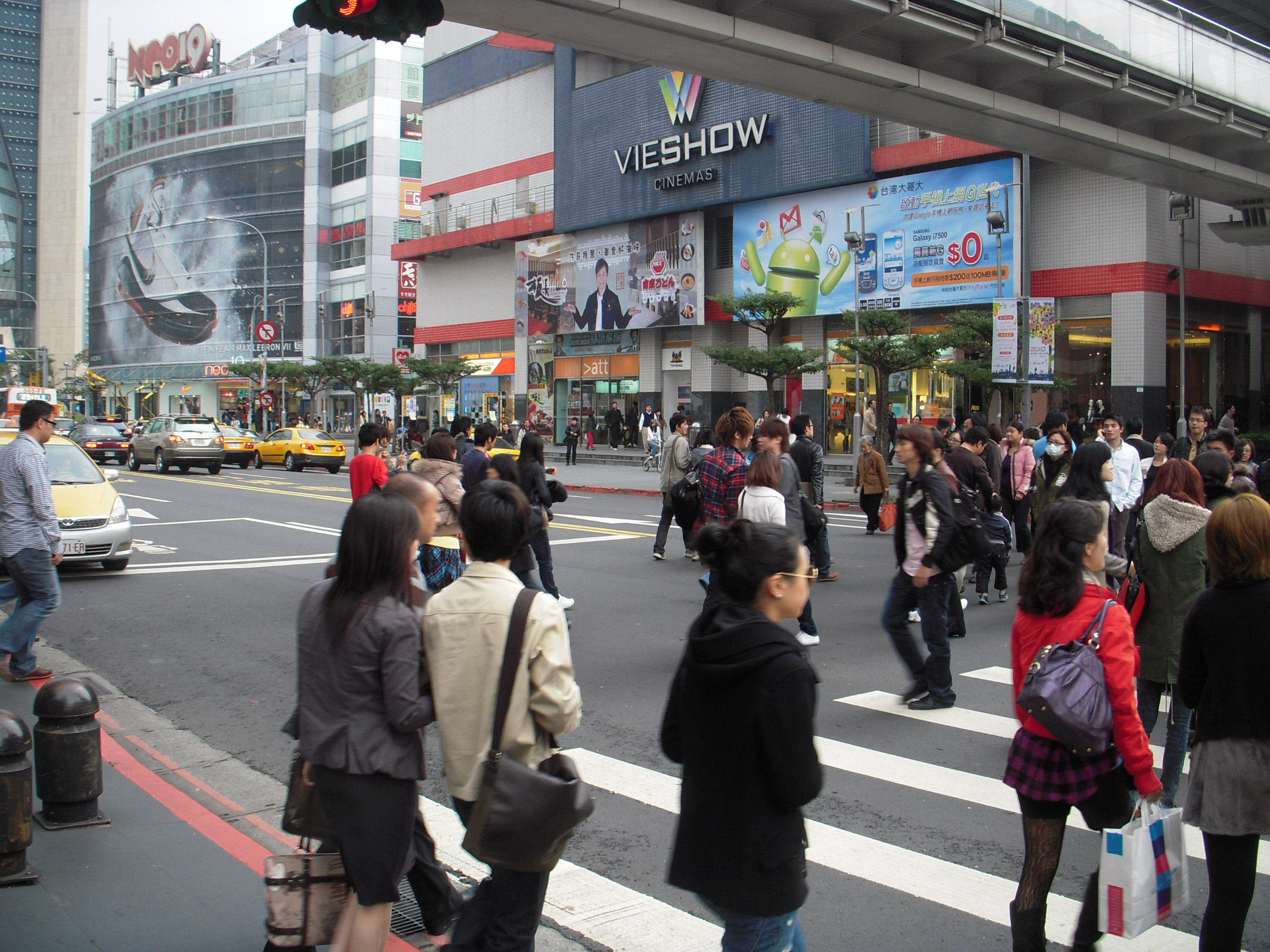
- Company type: Private company
- Industry: media, entertainment
- Founded: 8 July 1997
- Headquarters: 20, 2nd Floor, Songshou Road, Xinyi District, Taipei, Taiwan
- Number of locations: 19
- Area served: Taiwan
- Key people: CEO：Chaoli Wang
- Revenue: NT$2.914 billion（2010）
- Operating income: NT$402 million（2010）
- Number of employees: 1,100
- Website: www.vscinemas.com.tw

Vieshow Cinemas (Chinese: 威秀影城; pinyin: Wēixìu Yǐngchéng) is a Taiwanese cinema chain and the largest cinema chain in Taiwan. There are currently 19 locations in total: 4 in New Taipei City, 3 each in Taipei City, Taichung City, and Tainan City, 2 in Hsinchu City, and 1 each in Taoyuan City, Miaoli County, Kaohsiung City, and Hualien County, with a total of 201 screens.

== History ==
The company was originally called Warner Village Roadshow Cinemas, which operated in Taiwan from 1998 to 2004. It was a joint venture between Warner Bros. from the United States and Village Roadshow from Australia. Later, due to the joint divestment of Warner Bros. and Village Roadshow, four Taiwanese and Hong Kong companies, including Hong Kong Orange Sky Golden Harvest and CMC Magnetics, took over the operation and changed the company to the current name.

As of June 21, 2024, gaming company Wanin International, who is credited on the movie The Pig, the Snake and the Pigeon, owned the minority shares on Vieshow Cinemas chain.

== Business operations ==
=== Cinemas ===
Vieshow Cinemas has 20 cinemas and 205 screens in Taiwan currently.

==== Current locations ====
Cinema	Screens/Halls	District	City	Opening Year
Vieshow Cinemas Xinyi	15	Xinyi District	Taipei	1998
Vieshow Cinemas Taipei Qsquare	9	Datong District	Taipei	2009
MUVIE CINEMAS		Xinyi District	Taipei	2020
Vieshow Cinemas Banqiao Mega City	9	Banqiao District	New Taipei	2012
Vieshow Cinemas Global Mall Zhonghe	10	Zhonghe District	New Taipei	2005
Vieshow Cinemas Linkou Mitsui Outlet Park	9	Linkou District	New Taipei	2016
Vieshow Cinemas Yes!Life Mall	14	Xindian District	New Taipei	2023
Vieshow Cinemas Tonlin Plaza	20	Taoyuan District	Taoyuan	2017
Vieshow Cinemas Geleven Plaza	4	Taoyuan District	Taoyuan	2024
Vieshow Cinemas Hsinchu FE21	11	Hsinchu City	Hsinchu County	
Vieshow Cinemas Big City	8	Hsinchu City	Hsinchu County	2012
Vieshow Cinemas Shang Shun Mall	8	Toufen	Miaoli County	2015
Vieshow Cinemas Top City	7	Xitun District	Taichung	
Vieshow Cinemas Tiger City	10	Xitun District	Taichung	
Vieshow Cinemas Taroko Mall	9	East District	Taichung	2001
Vieshow Cinemas Tainan FE21	9	West Central District	Tainan	
Vieshow Cinemas Focus Square	9	West Central District	Tainan	2000
Vieshow Cinemas T.S. Mall	15	East District	Tainan	2015
Vieshow Cinemas Kaohsiung FE21	16	Lingya District	Kaohsiung	
Vieshow Cinemas New Paradiso	5	Ji'an	Hualien County	2019

==== Defunct locations ====
Cinema	Screens/Halls	District	City	Opening Year	Closing Year
Vieshow Cinemas Tianmu		Shilin District	Taipei	2004	2021
Vieshow Cinemas Miramar		Zhongshan District	Taipei	2004	2006
