= 50% =

50% may refer to:

- One half, an irreducible fraction
- "50%", a 2006 song by Grandaddy from Just Like the Fambly Cat
- "50% (Official Hige Dandism)", a 2024 song by Official Hige Dandism from Cells at Work! the movie.

== See also ==
- "50% & 50%", a 1993 song by Hide
- Middle 50% or interquartile range, a measure of statistical dispersion
- 50 Percent, a Taiwanese affordable fashion brand
- "Fifty Percent", a song from Ballroom, performed by Dorothy Loudon
