= Yes!Life Mall =

Shopping mall in Xindian, New Taipei, Taiwan

- 裕隆城
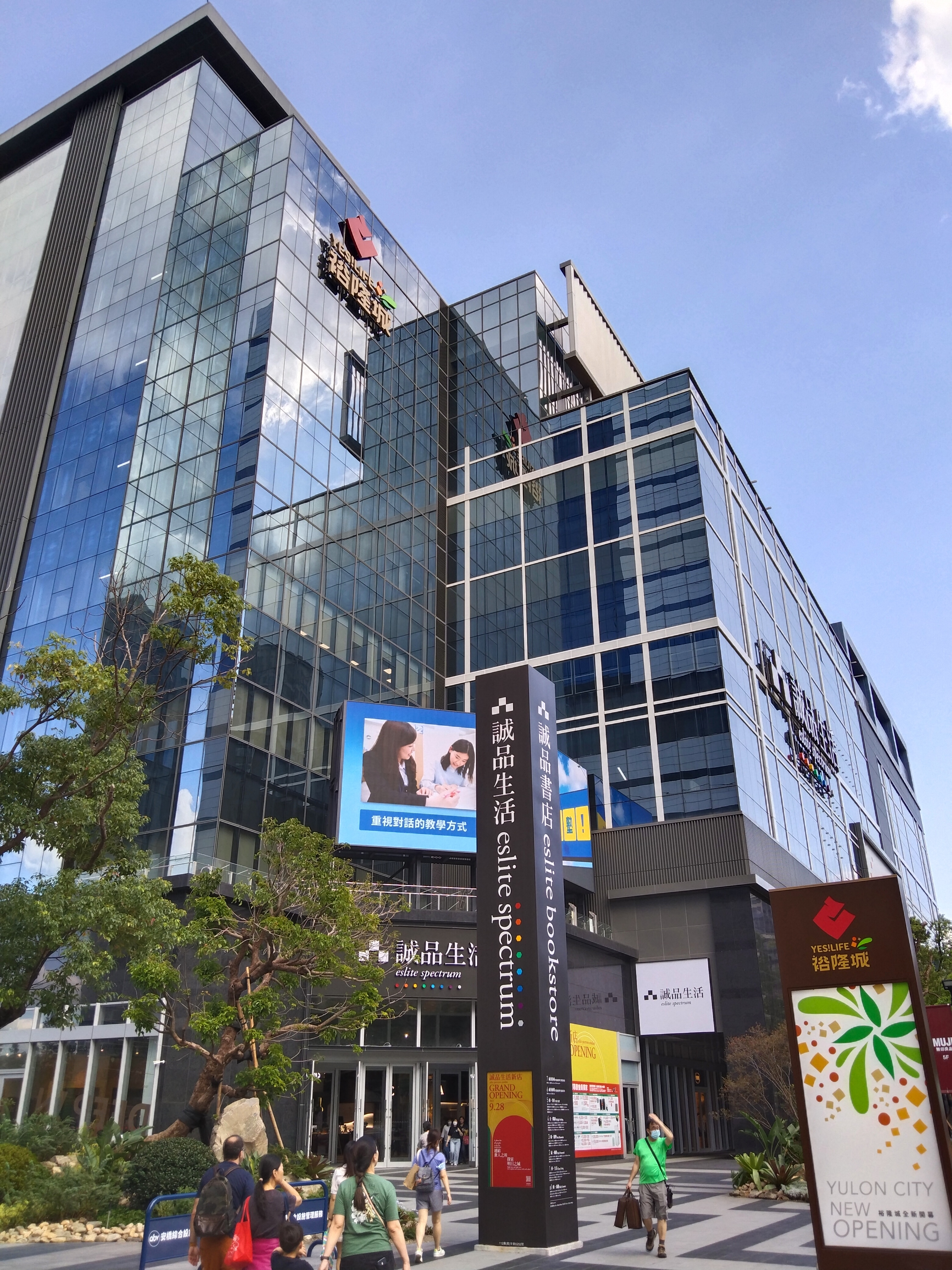
- Location: No. 70, Section 3, Zhongxing, Xindian District, New Taipei, Taiwan
- Coordinates: 24°58′42″N 121°32′47″E
- Opened: September 28, 2023
- Owner: Yulon
- Floor area: 217,603.84 m^{2} (2,342,268.2 sq ft)
- Public transit: Dapinglin metro station and Qizhang metro station
- Website: https://www.yuloncity.com.tw/

Yes!Life Mall (Chinese: 裕隆城; pinyin: Yùlóng Chéng) is a shopping center in Xindian District, New Taipei, Taiwan that opened on September 28, 2023. It is the first and largest shopping mall in the district. Owned and operated by Yulon, the total floor area of the mall is approximately 217,603.84 m^{2} (2,342,268.2 sq ft). The main core stores of the mall include Eslite, Vieshow Cinemas, Uniqlo, Muji, Nitori, Poya, Net, and various themed restaurants and entertainment centers. It is located within walking distance of both Dapinglin metro station and Qizhang metro station.

== Floor Guide ==
Level 7	Vieshow Cinemas
Level 6	Vieshow Cinemas
Level 5	Muji, Nitori, Net, Poya
Level 4	Themed restaurants
Level 3	Themed restaurants
Level 2	Engolili Cafe
Level 1	Starbucks, Cafe!n
B1	Marugame Seimen

== Gallery ==
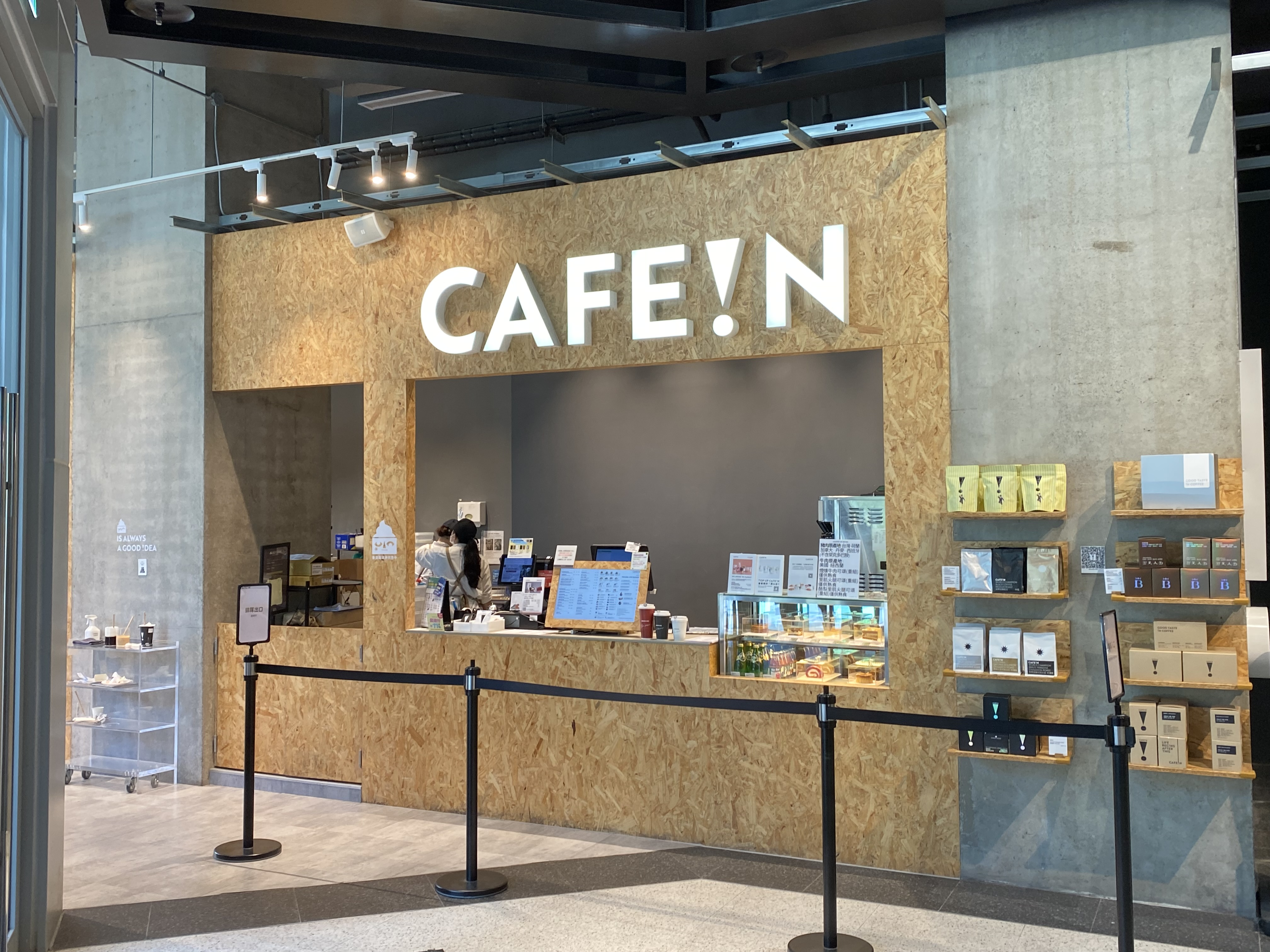
CAFE!N Store on Level 1

== See also ==
- List of tourist attractions in Taiwan
