= Ahmed Abdullah =

American jazz trumpeter

Ahmed Abdullah (born Leroy Bland; May 10, 1946) is an American jazz trumpeter who was a prominent member of Sun Ra's band.

== Biography ==
He began playing the trumpet at age 13 in his native New York City. One of the first groups he performed with was the Master Brotherhood. By the 1970s, he was performing in New York's loft scene with various groups including the Melodic Art-Tet (Charles Brackeen, Roger Blank and Ronnie Boykins, later William Parker) and joined the Sun Ra Arkestra. Abdullah formed his own band in 1972, and joined the Sun Ra Arkestra in 1975, working there on and off until 1993, when Sun Ra died. He stayed on with the Arkestra after Sun Ra's demise working under the leadership of John Gilmore and then Marshall Allen. During his time with the Arkestra, Abdullah participated in more than 25 recordings and traveled extensively with Sun Ra. After leaving the Arkestra, Abdullah wrote memoirs of his time with that organization. In 2002, Ahmed began teaching a course on the Music and Philosophy of Sun Ra at the New School for Jazz and Contemporary Music.

Abdullah's own bands have at times been called Abdullah, the Solomonic Unit, Diaspora and Ebonic Tones. In 1995, Ahmed and his wife, Monique Ngozi Nri, formed Melchizedek Music Productions (MMP), to breathe new life into the Sun Ra Arkestra. In 1998, Abdullah was asked to be the music director of Sistas' Place in Bedford Stuyvesant, Brooklyn. In 2019, Abdullah and his band Diaspora collaborated with former Sun Ra colleague Francisco Mora Catlett's ensemble AfroHORN to form Diaspora Meets AfroHORN and create the first recording for Melchizedek Music Productions: Jazz: A Music of the Spirit / Out of Sistas' Place.

In 2023, Blank Forms Editions published A Strange Celestial Road: My Time in the Sun Ra Arkestra, recounting Abdullah's participation in the Arkestra over a span of 20 years.

== Discography ==
=== As leader ===
- Wildflowers: The New York Loft Jazz Sessions (Douglas / Casablanca, 1976 [1977]) one track: "Blue Phase" with Charles Brackeen
- Live at Ali's Alley (Cadence, recorded 1978) released 1980 with Chico Freeman
- Life's Force (About Time, 1979) with Vincent Chancey, Jay Hoggard, Muneer Abdul Fatah, Jerome Hunter, Rashied Sinan
- Liquid Magic (Silkheart, 1987) with Charles Brackeen, Malachi Favors, Alvin Fielder
- Ahmed Abdullah and the Solomonic Quintet (Silkheart, 1988) with Charles Moffett, David S. Ware and Fred Hopkins, Masujaa
- Dedication (CIMP, 1998) with Carlos Ward and Alex Blake
- Actual Proof (CIMP, 1999) with NAM: Alex Harding, Masa Kamaguchi, Jimmy Weinstein
- Song of Time: Live at the Vision Festival (Clean Feed, 2004) with NAM: Alex Harding, Masa Kamaguchi, Jimmy Weinstein
- Traveling the Spaceways (Planet Arts, 2004), Billy Bang, Salim Washington, Craig Harris, Cody Moffett, Masujaa, Radu ben Judah, Monique Ngozi Nri, Owuar Arunga
- Tara's Song (TUM, 2005) with Billy Bang, Alex Harding, Alex Blake and Andrei Strobert
- Jazz: A Music of the Spirit / Out of Sistas' Place (Amedian, 2019), with Diaspora Meets AfroHORN: Ahmed Abdullah, Francisco Mora Catlett, Alex Harding, Donald Smith, Radu ben Judah, Bob Stewart, Roman Diaz, Ronnie Burrage, Don Chapman, Monique Ngozi Nri

=== As sideman ===
With Sun Ra

- A Quiet Place in the Universe (Leo, 1976/77)
- Destination Unknown (Enja)
- Somewhere Else (Rounder, 1988–89)
- Mayan Temples (Black Saint, 1990)
- Live at Montreux (Inner City, 1976)
- Cosmos (Cobra, 1976)

With Billy Bang

- The Fire from Within (Soul Note, 1984)

With Arthur Blythe

- The Grip (India Navigation, 1977)
- Metamorphosis (India Navigation, 1977)

With Dennis González

- Namesake (Silkheart, 1987)

With The Group (Abdullah, Marion Brown, Billy Bang, Sirone, Fred Hopkins, Andrew Cyrille)

- Live (NoBusiness Records, 2012)

With the Melodic Art-Tet (Abdullah, Charles Brackeen, William Parker, Roger Blank, Tony Waters)

- Melodic Art–Tet (No Business Records, 2013)
