= Song of Time =

Song of Time may refer to:

- Song of Time: Live at the Vision Festival, a 2004 album by NAM
- Song of Time, a 1996 Magic: The Gathering novel by Teri McLaren
- Song of Time, a 2008 novel by Ian R. MacLeod

== See also ==
- Song of Times, a 2007 album by Starcastle
