= Owuor Arunga =

- Born: Kisumu, Kenya
- Genres: Jazz, hip Hop
- Occupation: Trumpeter
- Years active: 2000–present

Owuor Arunga is a jazz trumpeter.

He was born in Kisumu in Kenya and moved to New York in the early 2000s, where he studied in The New School's Jazz & Contemporary Music Program. Some of the artist he's played amongst or apprenticed with include Charlie Persip, Candido Camero, Billy Bang, The Cadillacs, Robert Glasper, Louis Reyes Rivera, Olu Dara, Jimmy Owens, and Chico Freeman. In 2005 he recorded with Ahmed Abdullah. He was given the nickname of 'The Pied Piper' by his elder musicians.

Arunga has also played with Seattle hip hop acts including Macklemore (The Heist), The Physics, and Black Stax.

From his origin as a member of the Garfield High School Jazz Band, Owuor has since played around the United States and toured around the world, including Canada, Europe and South Africa.

== Discography ==
- 2004: Ahmed Abdullah - Traveling the Spaceways
- 2012: Macklemore & Ryan Lewis - The Heist
