= Attainment =

Attainment may refer to:

- Status attainment, in society
- Educational attainment
- Attainment to standards in air pollution, Non-attainment area (US)
- Attainment (album), Charles Brackeen, 1987
