= Cosmos (Sun Ra album) =

Studio album by Sun Ra
- Released: 1976
- Recorded: August 1976; Studio Hautefeuille, Paris
- Genre: Free jazz
- Length: 37:56
- Label: Cobra; COB 37001

Sun Ra chronology
Live at Montreux (1976)	Cosmos (1976)	A Quiet Place in the Universe (1977)

Cosmos is an album by jazz composer, bandleader and keyboardist Sun Ra and his Arkestra, recorded in France in 1976 and originally released on the French Cobra label in Europe and on Inner City Records in the US.

== Reception ==
The AllMusic review by Ron Wynn stated, "Sun Ra provided some stunning moments on the Rocksichord, while leading The Arkestra through stomping full-band cuts of atmospheric or alternately hard bop compositions, peeling off various saxophonists for skittering, screaming, at times spacey dialogues".

Professional ratings
Review scores
Source	Rating
AllMusic	4/5 stars
The Rolling Stone Jazz Record Guide	3/5 stars

== Track listing ==
All compositions by Sun Ra

1. "The Mystery of Two" - 5:51
2. "Interstellar Low Ways" - 5:23
3. "Neo Project #2" - 5:04
4. "Cosmos" - 2:58
5. "Moonship Journey" - 6:17
6. "Journey Among the Stars" - 5:13
7. "Jazz from an Unknown Planet" - 7:10

== Personnel ==
- Sun Ra - Rocksichord
- John Gilmore - tenor saxophone
- Marshall Allen, Danny Davis - alto saxophone, flute
- Danny Ray Thompson - baritone saxophone, flute
- Eloe Omoe - bass clarinet, flute
- Jac Jacson - bassoon, flute
- Ahmed Abdullah - trumpet
- Vincent Chancey - French horn
- Craig Harris - trombone
- R. Anthony Bunn - electric bass
- Larry Bright - drums
