= Jazz: A Music of the Spirit =

Jazz: A Music of the Spirit / Out of Sistas' Place

Studio album by Ahmed Abdullah's Diaspora and Francisco Mora Catlett's AfroHORN
- Released: 2019
- Genre: Free jazz
- Label: Amedian

Ahmed Abdullah chronology
Tara's Song (2005)	Jazz: A Music of the Spirit / Out of Sistas' Place (2019)

Jazz: A Music of the Spirit / Out of Sistas' Place is an album by Diaspora Meets AfroHORN, featuring the combined forces of two bands led by Sun Ra alumni: trumpeter Ahmed Abdullah's group Diaspora, and percussionist Francisco Mora Catlett's ensemble AfroHORN. It was released in 2019 by Abdullah's Amedian label. On the album, Abdullah and Mora Catlett are joined by saxophonists Don Chapman and Alex Harding, tubist Bob Stewart, pianist Donald Smith, vocalist Monique Ngozi Nri, bassist Radu ben Judah, and percussionists Ronnie Burrage and Roman Diaz.

Sistas' Place is a Brooklyn-based coffee shop and music venue of which Abdullah is the music director.

== Reception ==
Professional ratings
Review scores
Source	Rating
UK Vibe	5/5 stars
Jazz Journal	3.5/5 stars

In a review for UK Vibe, James Read wrote: "There's plenty on this album that will be familiar to fans of Sun Ra, Abdullah is certainly succeeding in his mission to keep the music of his mentor alive but his own voice is powerful in the mix and I'm guessing his younger self might be pretty satisfied with the outcome."

David Whiteis of JazzTimes noted that "the set is infused with sharply honed commentary and gritty urbanity," and described the track titled "Terra Firma" as "a jubilant after-hours jam" in which "the intergalactic explorers have returned with stories to tell, and the celebration is underway."

Jazz Journal's Simon Adams called the album a "fine set," and referred to Abdullah as "a natural leader whose impact is felt on every one of the eight tracks."

Writing for Aquarium Drunkard, Jason P. Woodbury described the album as "a fine collection of cosmic jazz, exploratory, soothing, and coursing with imagination."

Downtown Music Gallery's Bruce Lee Gallanter commented: "This entire disc reminds me of the way a great Sun Ra concert would take us on a journey into outer & inner space, get us to think about how we have treated the Planet Earth and give us Hope for Better Days. Nothing better than Cosmic Medicine for Inspired Souls."

Writer and musician Eddie Myer called the album "a joy from start to finish," and remarked: "The music delivers everything that late-career Arkestra devotees could hope for... and the ensemble pieces have the kind of raggedly joyous spontaneity that reach back through the Arkestra to the Mingus bands and beyond to the dawn of the music. Abdullah's unfailingly committed, earthy trumpet is a unifying thread throughout."

In an article for The New York City Jazz Record, George Kanzler wrote: "For those who missed the Sun Ra Arkestra and Loft jazz of the 20th Century, this is a worthy trip down memory lane."

== Track listing ==
1. "Accent" (Earl Coleman)
2. "Eternal Spiraling Spirit" (Ahmed Abdullah / Louis Reyes Rivera)
3. "Discipline 27" (Sun Ra / Ahmed Abdullah)
4. "Love in Outer Space" (Sun Ra / Louis Reyes Rivera)
5. "Magwalandini" (Miriam Makeba)
6. "Lights on a Satellite" (Sun Ra)
7. "Terra Firma" (Monique Ngozi Nri)
8. "Reminiscing" (Reginald Fields)

== Personnel ==
- Ahmed Abdullah – trumpet, flugelhorn, vocals
- Francisco Mora Catlett – percussion
- Monique Ngozi Nri – poetry and vocals
- Alex Harding – baritone saxophone
- Don Chapman – tenor saxophone
- Bob Stewart – tuba
- Donald Smith – piano
- Radu ben Judah – bass
- Ronnie Burrage – drums
- Roman Diaz – percussion
