= Namesake (brand) =

Taiwanese casual clothing brand

- Product type: Casual lifestyle clothing
- Current owner: Michael, Richard, and Steve Lin
- Country: Taiwan
- Introduced: 2020
- Markets: Taiwan
- Website: namesak3.com

Namesake is a Taiwanese fashion brand known for blending basketball culture with avant-garde streetwear. It was founded by the Lin family. The brand has gained international recognition, being nominated for the LVMH Prize in 2023.

== History ==
Namesake was established by three brothers—Michael, Richard, and Steve Lin—who shared a passion for both fashion and basketball. The label gained international attention after being nominated for the LVMH Prize in 2023.

== See also ==
- 50 Percent
- Lativ
- NET
- OqLiq
- Fashion in Taiwan
- Goopimade
