= Stefan (album) =

Studio album by Dennis González New Dallas Quartet
- Released: 1987
- Recorded: April 4–5, 1986 and February 13, 1987
- Studio: Omega Audio, Dallas, TX
- Genre: Jazz
- Length: 42:40
- Label: Silkheart SHLP 101
- Producer: Dennis González

Dennis González chronology
Little Toot (1985)	Stefan (1987)	Namesake (1987)

Stefan is an album led by trumpeter Dennis González which was recorded in 1987 and released on the Swedish Silkheart label.

== Reception ==
Professional ratings
Review scores
Source	Rating
AllMusic	4/5 stars
The Penguin Guide to Jazz	4/4 stars

The Penguin Guide to Jazz notes "Stefan is probably the trumpeter's masterpiece ... a masterful record". In his review for AllMusic, Brian Olewnick states "Stefan is arguably one of Gonzalez' best efforts, and is decidedly one of the better entryways into his unique world. Recommended".

== Track listing ==
All compositions by Dennis González except where noted.

1. "Enrico" – 7:47
2. "Fortuity" (W.A. Richardson, Ronie Boykins) – 2:28
3. "Stefan" – 8:00
4. "Hymn for Don Cherry" – 5:52
5. "Boi Fuba" (Traditional) – 3:07
6. "Deacin John Ray" (John Purcell) – 9:29
7. "Doxology" – 6:34 Bonus track on CD release

== Personnel ==
- Dennis González – trumpet, flugelhorn, berimbau
- John Purcell – bass clarinet, alto saxophone, flute (tracks 1–5)
- Malachi Favors (track 6), Henry Franklin (tracks 1–5) – bass
- W. A. Richardson – drums
