= Dedication (Ahmed Abdullah album) =

Studio album by Ahmed Abdullah's Diaspora
- Released: 1998
- Recorded: June 17 and 18, 1997
- Studio: The Spirit Room, Rossie, New York
- Genre: Free jazz
- Label: CIMP; 152
- Producer: Robert D. Rusch

Ahmed Abdullah chronology
Ahmed Abdullah and the Solomonic Quintet (1988)	Dedication (1998)	Actual Proof (1999)

Dedication is an album by trumpeter Ahmed Abdullah. It was recorded on June 17 and 18, 1997, at the Spirit Room in Rossie, New York, and was released in 1998 by CIMP. On the album, Abdullah is joined by members of his band Diaspora: saxophonist and flutist Carlos Ward, guitarist Masujaa (Hugh Riley), bassist Alex Blake, and drummer Cody Moffett, son of Charles Moffett, to whom the album is dedicated.

== Reception ==
Professional ratings
Review scores
Source	Rating
AllMusic	4/5 stars
The Penguin Guide to Jazz	3/4 stars

In a review for AllMusic, Scott Yanow wrote: "The close interplay between the musicians makes the frequently avant-garde music seem more accessible than expected and Abdullah is heard throughout in prime form."

Bill Shoemaker of JazzTimes called the group "one serious band," and stated: "there is close to an hour of cogent, undiluted music on Dedication, a claim that too few albums in this glutted market can make."

Writing for All About Jazz, Derek Taylor commented: "Tributes, particularly musical ones, can be a tricky enterprise and reconciling a reverence for the dedicatee with one's own creative vision is often a delicate balance. Abdullah and his bandmates attain such a harmony on this disc juggling their love for Moffett with their own restlessly creative energies to produce a testament of moving depth and passion."

The authors of The Penguin Guide to Jazz Recordings remarked: "the music has a cheerful, celebratory feel, old-fashioned like a free-bop date of 25 years before, and it's quite a warming experience."

== Track listing ==
1. "Amanpondo" (Ahmed Abdullah) – 14:43
2. "Brazil One" (Ahmed Abdullah) – 7:53
3. "Song of the Force - Take 4" (Ahmed Abdullah) – 5:15
4. "Deja's View" (Masujaa) – 10:35
5. "Song of the Holy Warrior" (Ahmed Abdullah) – 11:22
6. "La Vie en rose" (Louiguy, Mack David) – 3:37
7. "Song of Love" (Ahmed Abdullah) – 6:16
8. "I'll Be Seeing You" (Sammy Fain) – 5:23
9. "Song of the Force - Take 2" (Ahmed Abdullah) – 7:19

== Personnel ==
- Ahmed Abdullah – trumpet, flugelhorn, voice
- Carlos Ward – alto saxophone, flute
- Masujaa (Hugh Riley) – guitar
- Alex Blake – bass
- Cody Moffett – drums
