= Tara's Song =

Studio album by Ahmed Abdullah's Ebonic Tones
- Released: 2005
- Recorded: May 10, 2004
- Studio: Loho Studios, New York City
- Genre: Jazz
- Label: TUM Records; CD 009
- Producer: Ahmed Abdullah, Petri Haussila

Ahmed Abdullah chronology
Traveling the Spaceways (2004)	Tara's Song (2005)	Jazz: A Music of the Spirit / Out of Sistas' Place (2019)

Tara's Song is an album by trumpeter Ahmed Abdullah. It was recorded on May 10, 2004, at Loho Studios in New York City, and was released in 2005 by TUM Records. On the album, Abdullah is joined by members of his band Ebonic Tones: saxophonist Alex Harding, violinist Billy Bang, bassist Alex Blake, and drummer Andrei Strobert.

== Reception ==
Professional ratings
Review scores
Source	Rating
AllMusic	4/5 stars
All About Jazz	4/5 stars
The Encyclopedia of Popular Music	4/5 stars
The Penguin Guide to Jazz Recordings	4/4 stars
Tom Hull – on the Web	A−

In a review for AllMusic, Scott Yanow wrote: "This is a surprising date, one that rewards repeated listenings."

Jeff Stockton of All About Jazz called the album "marvelous," and described Ebonic Tones as "a supergroup, like when Eric Clapton played with Stevie Winwood in Blind Faith." He stated: "One can only imagine how joyous this band is live."

Writing for JazzTimes, Chris Kelsey commented: "Abdullah... is a wonderfully lyrical, spirited improviser and gifted arranger. Remindful of pianist Abdullah Ibrahim's various small groups, this band exudes an authentically joyful intelligence."

The authors of The Penguin Guide to Jazz Recordings described the album as "a wonderful record and testimony to Abdullah's quietly growing authority as he approaches 60."

JazzWord's Ken Waxman praised Abdullah's composition "The Cave," stating that some of the voicings are "reminiscent of the low-flame tone poems saxophonist [Gigi] Gyrce used to write for himself and trumpeter Art Farmer. Earthier than Gryce, the baritonist creates a guttural, raspy tremolo solo... while the trumpeter's double-tongued, chromatic flourishes take nothing from Farmer. Then there's Bang's slithering, triple-stopping movement. By the finale, it's obvious this cave encompasses Sun Ra-like polyharmony, as well as spikier, serpentine solo lines."

== Track listing ==
1. "Sans Souci" (Gigi Gryce) – 7:39
2. "Lonely Woman" (Ornette Coleman) – 12:52
3. "Tara's Song" (Ahmed Abdullah) – 9:16
4. "Nothing But Love" (Frank Lowe) – 6:37
5. "Tapestry" (Sun Ra) – 8:11
6. "Blue Monk" (Thelonious Monk) – 7:12
7. "Fate in a Pleasant Mood" (Sun Ra) – 4:40
8. "The Cave" (Ahmed Abdullah) – 14:16
9. "Iko Iko" (Traditional) – 3:21

== Personnel ==
- Ahmed Abdullah – trumpet, voice
- Alex Harding – baritone saxophone
- Billy Bang – violin
- Alex Blake – bass
- Andrei Strobert – drums
