= Actual Proof =

Studio album by Ahmed Abdullah and NAM
- Released: 1999
- Recorded: January 18 and 19, 1999
- Studio: The Spirit Room, Rossie, New York
- Genre: Free jazz
- Label: CIMP; 192
- Producer: Robert D. Rusch

Ahmed Abdullah chronology
Dedication (1998)	Actual Proof (1999)	Song of Time: Live at the Vision Festival (2004)

Actual Proof is an album by trumpeter Ahmed Abdullah. It was recorded on January 18 and 19, 1999, at the Spirit Room in Rossie, New York, and was released in 1999 by CIMP. On the album, Abdullah is joined by members of the band called NAM: saxophonist and clarinetist Alex Harding, bassist Masa Kamaguchi, and drummer Jimmy Weinstein.

== Reception ==
Professional ratings
Review scores
Source	Rating
AllMusic	3.5/5 stars
The Penguin Guide to Jazz	3/4 stars
The Virgin Encyclopedia of Jazz	3/5 stars

In a review for AllMusic, Steve Loewy wrote: "Abdullah is not so much a radical interpreter as an individualist with an old-time approach to the trumpet applied to modern harmonics. He growls, 'gets down,' and often sticks to a blues aesthetic, yet he also incorporates a style that hearkens to early Ornette... Much of the CD amounts to almost a highly effective blowing session, with the horns taking lengthy solos."

Peter Margasak of JazzTimes noted that "Abdullah never loses sight of how his contribution fits into the performance at large," and stated: "Taking on a wonderfully diverse program... this group... keenly investigates the avant garde's periphery."

Writing for All About Jazz, Derek Taylor called the album "another resplendent feather in the cap for CIMP," and commented: "The quartet elects a diverse songbook of tunes for the date that draw both on jazz traditions and on South African musical styles which have long been a source of erudition for Abdullah."

The authors of The Penguin Guide to Jazz Recordings noted that "Abdullah's interest in the nexus of New Orleans and Africa is a dominant concern," and praised "Song of Tenderness," stating that his "muted solo floats over a bass-line that old Fred [Hopkins] would have loved."

== Track listing ==
1. "Magwalandini" (Miriam Makeba) – 9:35
2. "Blues for Barbara Jean" (Alex Harding) – 11:05
3. "Sketch" (Sun Ra) – 7:39
4. "Serenade for Marion Brown" (Gunter Hampel) – 8:43
5. "Naima" (John Coltrane) – 12:35
6. "Song of Tenderness" (Ahmed Abdullah) – 6:19
7. "Song of Time (For Fred Hopkins) / Shaka Zulu" (Ahmed Abdullah, Bob Smith) – 12:39

== Personnel ==
- Ahmed Abdullah – trumpet
- Alex Harding – baritone saxophone, bass clarinet
- Masa Kamaguchi – bass
- Jimmy Weinstein – drums
