= Focus Square =

Shopping mall in West Central, Tainan, Taiwan

- Focus時尚流行館
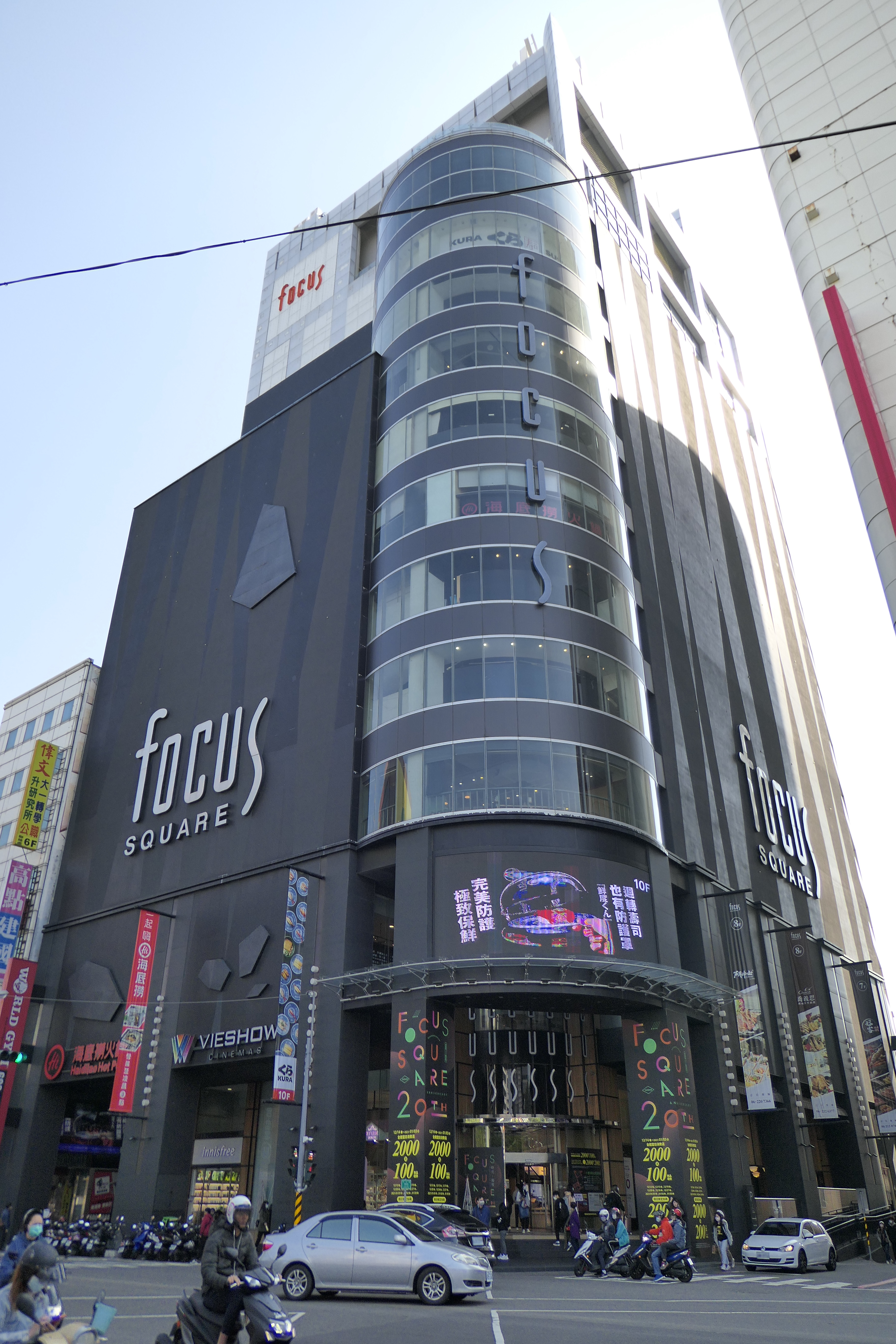
- Location: 166, Zhongshan Road, West Central District, Tainan, Taiwan
- Coordinates: 22.9957°N 120.2102°E
- Opened: December 2000
- Manager: Koche Development Co., Ltd.
- Owner: Koche Development Co., Ltd.
- Floors: 13 floors above ground 5 floors below ground

Focus Square (Chinese: Focus時尚流行館) is a shopping mall in West Central District, Tainan, Taiwan that opened in December 2000. The mall consists of 13 floors above ground and 5 floors below ground. In 2016, the entire mall underwent a major renovation, including the exterior walls, which were painted black. The main core stores of the mall includes Vieshow Cinemas on the top three floors and World Gym on the basement floors.

== Gallery ==
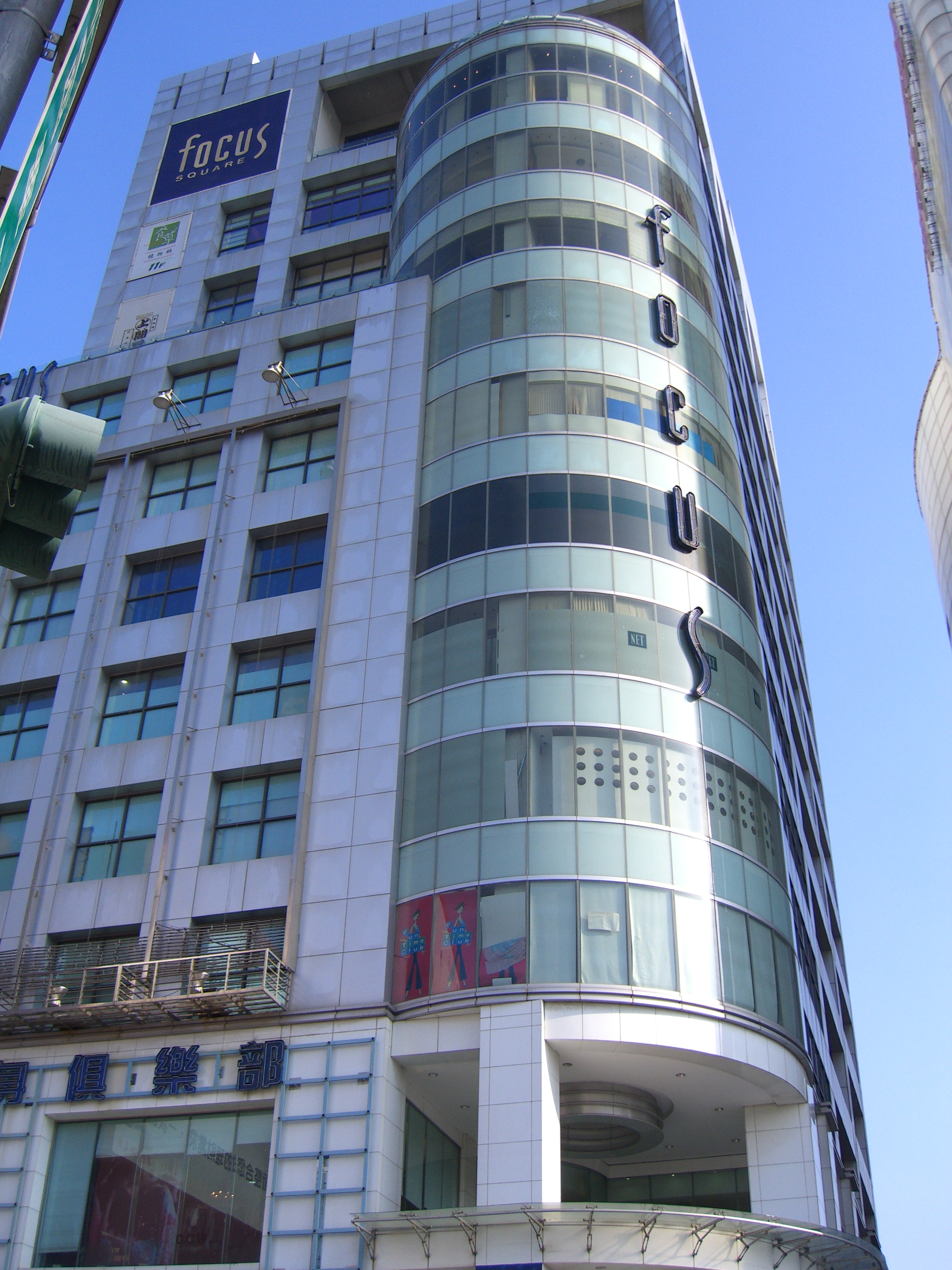
Focus Square in 2007 before the renovation

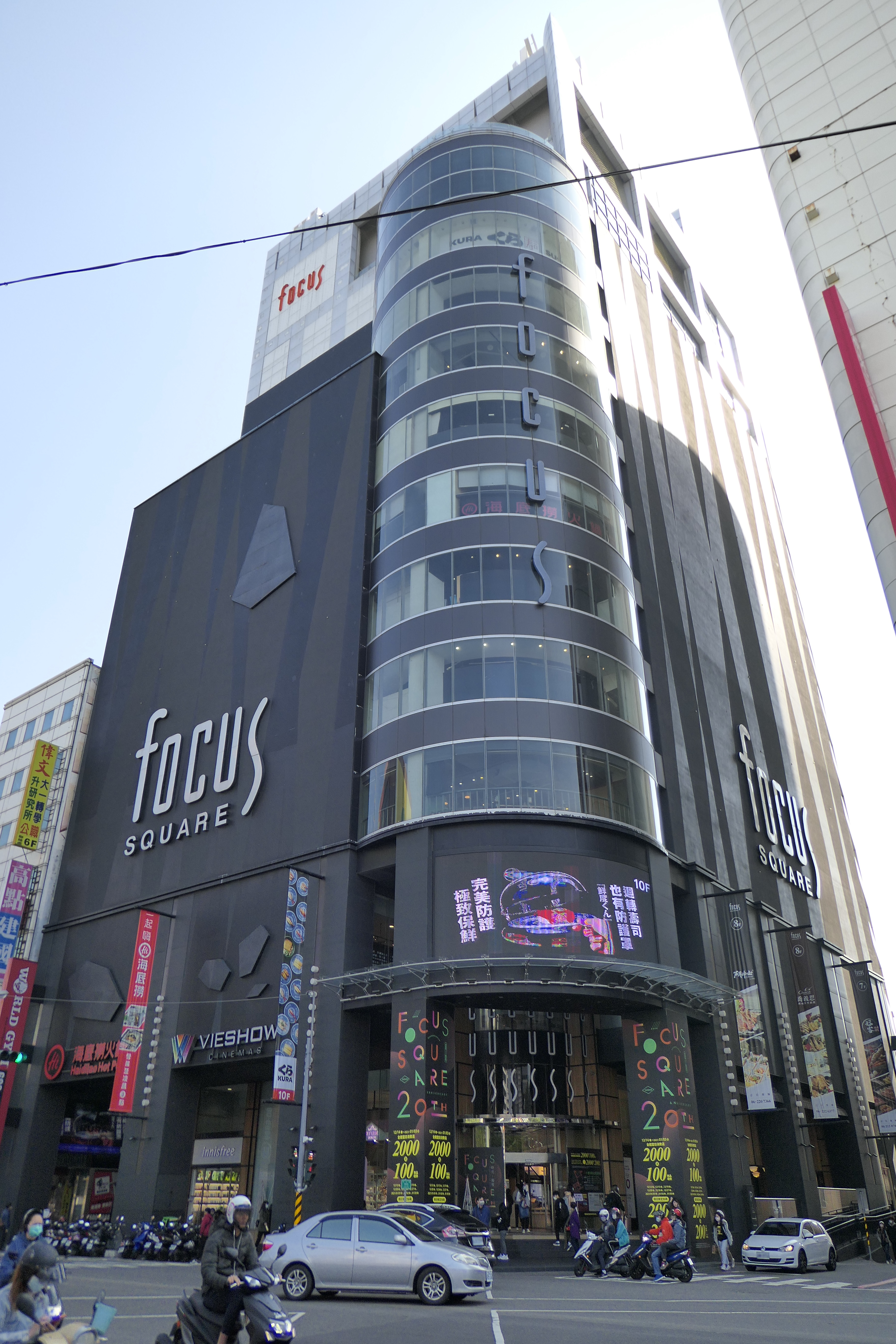
Focus Square in 2021 after the renovation

== See also ==
- List of tourist attractions in Taiwan
