= After Fallen Leaves =

Studio album by Roscoe Mitchell
- Released: 1992
- Recorded: October 30 & 31, 1989
- Studio: Studio 9, Swedish Radio, Stockholm
- Genre: Jazz
- Length: 67:33
- Label: Silkheart

Roscoe Mitchell chronology
| Songs in the Wind (1991) | After Fallen Leaves (1992) | Duets & Solos (1993) |

After Fallen Leaves is an album by American jazz saxophonist Roscoe Mitchell. It was recorded in 1989 and released on the Swedish label Silkheart. Mitchell joined the Brus Trio for a tour of Sweden which culminated in this studio recording.

== Reception ==
Professional ratings
Review scores
| Source | Rating |
|---|---|
| AllMusic | 2.5/5 stars |
| The Penguin Guide to Jazz | 3/4 stars |

In his review for AllMusic, Brian Olewnick states "After Fallen Leaves isn't a bad album and it's always worth hearing Mitchell, but he has more than a dozen recordings under his name that should be heard first."

The Penguin Guide to Jazz says that "There are many good moments without the session really making a coherent impact, since the trio seem eager but too unfamiliar with Mitchell's methods."

== Track listing ==
All compositions by Roscoe Mitchell

1. "Sing" – 15:22
2. "A Lovely Day at the Point" – 4:40
3. "The Reverend Frank Wright" – 7:04
4. "And Then There Was Peace" – 4:50
5. "The Two Faces of Everett Sloane" – 3:29
6. "After Fallen Leaves" – 7:59
7. "Mr. Freddie" – 4:33
8. "Come Gathers Some Things" – 11:58
9. "Play with the Whistler" – 7:26

== Personnel ==
- Roscoe Mitchell - flute, alto sax, tenor sax, soprano sax
- Arne Forsén – piano
- Ulf Åkerhielm – bass
- Gilbert Matthews – drums, gongs, chimes, percussion
