= Rhythm X (album) =

Studio album by Charles Brackeen
- Released: 1973
- Recorded: January 26, 1968, in New York
- Genre: Jazz
- Length: 34:34
- Label: Strata-East SES-19736
- Producer: Clifford Jordan

Charles Brackeen chronology
Rhythm X (1973)	Bannar (1987)

Rhythm X is the debut album led by saxophonist Charles Brackeen, recorded in 1968 but not released on the Strata-East label until 1973.

== Reception ==
Professional ratings
Review scores
Source	Rating
AllMusic	4/5 stars
The Penguin Guide to Jazz	3/4 stars

The Penguin Guide to Jazz states, "Rhythm X is a valuable glimpse of the earlier, pre-sabbatical Brackeen ... Though nowhere near as individual as the later Silkhearts, the 1968 record is packed with gritty detail." In his review for AllMusic, Rob Ferrier states, "On this record, the little-known Charles Brackeen brings his saxophone to a party with most of Ornette Coleman's band. As might be expected, while Brackeen certainly holds his own, it's Ornette's boys who bring the thunder, playing around Brackeen's muscular alto as if they were a gang jumping on a new member ... with results that are often surprising and never short of beautiful".

== Track listing ==
All compositions by Charles Brackeen.

1. "Rhythm X" – 8:01
2. "Hour Glass" – 11:35
3. "Charles Concept" – 6:45
4. "C. B. Blues" – 7:42

== Personnel ==
- Charles Brackeen – tenor saxophone
- Don Cherry – trumpet
- Charlie Haden – bass
- Ed Blackwell – drums
