= Silkheart Records =

Swedish record company and label

- Founded: 1985
- Founder: Lars-Olof Gustavsson; Keith Knox
- Genre: Jazz
- Country of origin: Sweden
- Location: Stockholm
- Official website: www.silkheart.se

Silkheart Records is a Swedish record company and label dedicated to improvised music and free jazz.

Lars-Olof Gustavsson and Keith Knox founded Silkheart in 1985. In 1991, Jimmy Johnson of Forced Exposure suggested that Silkheart "could easily be considered for the new ESP-Disk throne." The Penguin Guide to Jazz describes the four albums that Dennis González recorded for the label as "part of a determined effort to wrest creative initiative back from New York and the West Coast". Charles Brackeen (whom Silkheart's management and González had coaxed out of retirement) recorded three albums for Silkheart.

== Releases ==
- 101 Dennis González New Dallas Quartet – Stefan
- 102 Steve Lacy Sextet – The Gleam
- 103 Steve Lacy Quartet – One Fell Swoop
- 104 Ahmed Abdullah Quartet – Liquid Magic
- 105 Charles Brackeen Quartet – Bannar
- 106 Dennis González New Dallas Sextet – Namesake
- 107 Michael Bisio Quartet – In Seattle
- 108 Ethnic Heritage Ensemble – Ancestral Song
- 109 Ahmed Abdullah – Ahmed Abdullah and the Solomonic Quintet
- 110 Charles Brackeen Quartet – Attainment
- 111 Charles Brackeen Quartet – Worshippers Come Nigh
- 112 Dennis González New Dallasorleanssippi – Debenge – Debenge
- 113 David S. Ware Trio – Passage to Music
- 114 Booker T. Williams – Go Tell It on the Mountain
- 115 Charles Gayle Quartet – Always Born
- 116 Charles Gayle Trio – Homeless
- 117 Charles Gayle Trio – Spirits Before
- 118 Charles Tyler + Brus Trio – Autumn in Paris
- 119 William Hooker Quartet – Lifeline
- 120 Other Dimensions in Music – Other Dimensions In Music
- 121 Denis Charles Triangle – Queen Mary
- 122 Rob Brown Trio – Breath Rhyme
- 123 William Hooker Ensemble – The Firmament Fury
- 124 Dennis González New Dallas Angeles – The Desert Wind
- 125 Joel Futterman Quartet – Vision in Time
- 126 Roscoe Mitchell + Brus Trio – After Fallen Leaves
- 127 David S. Ware Quartet – Great Bliss, Vol. 1
- 128 David S. Ware Quartet – Great Bliss, Vol. 2
- 129 Matthew Shipp Quartet – Points
- 130 Various artists – Spirit of New Jazz
- 131 Joel Futterman Trio – Berlin Images
- 132 Ernest Dawkins New Horizons Ensemble – South Side Street Songs
- 133 Jim Hobbs Trio – Babadita
- 134 Charles Gayle Quartet – Translations
- 135 Hal Russell & Joel Futterman Quartet – Naked Colours
- 136 Jim Hobbs Fully Celebrated Orchestra – Peace & Pig Grease
- 137 Charles Gayle Quartet – Raining Fire
- 138 Bob Ackerman Trio – Old & New Magic
- 139 Roy Campbell Pyramid – Communion
- 140 Ernest Dawkins New Horizons Ensemble – Chicago Now Vol. 1
- 141 Ernest Dawkins New Horizons Ensemble – Chicago Now Vol. 2
- 142 Ethnic Heritage Ensemble – 21st Century Union March
- 143 The Joel Futterman & Kidd Jordan Quintet – Nickelsdorf Konfrontation
- 144 Steve Lacy – 5 x Monk 5 x Lacy
- 145 David S. Ware Quartet – Oblations and Blessings
- 146 Andrew Cyrille – Richard Teitelbaum Duo – Double Clutch
- 147 William Hooker – Billy Bang Duo – Joy (Within)!
- 148 Assif Tsahar Trio – Ain Sof
- 149 AALY Trio + Ken Vandermark – Hidden in the Stomach
- 150 Ethnic Heritage Ensemble – Ka – Real
- 151 Borgmann / Morris / Charles Trio – The Last Concert – Dankeschön
- 152 Kidd Jordan Quartet – New Orleans Festival Suite
- 153 Heinz Geisser & Guerino Mazzola Duo – Folia / The Unam Concert
- 154 Heinz Geisser & Guerino Mazzola] Duo – Someday
- 155 Sirone Bang Ensemble – Configuration
- 156 Matt Lavelle Trio – Spiritual Power
- 157 Charles Gayle Quartet – Blue Shadows
- 158 Other Dimensions in Music featuring Fay Victor – Kaiso Stories

== See also ==
- List of record labels
- Ayler Records, Sister label
