= Ear of the Beholder =

Ear of Beholder

Studio album by Lol Coxhill
- Released: 1971
- Recorded: July 1970
- Genre: Avant-garde jazz
- Length: 76:19
- Label: Ampex Records
- Producer: Lol Coxhill

Lol Coxhill chronology
Ear of Beholder (1971)	Digswell Duets (1978)

Professional ratings
Review scores
Source	Rating
AllMusic	4/5 stars

Ear of Beholder (erroneously mistitled as Ear of the Beholder in some reissues) is the debut double LP by British saxophonist Lol Coxhill, released in 1971 by John Peel's Dandelion Records in the UK, Ampex Records in the U.S. and Canada, and reissued at different times by various labels around the world, in different formats.

== Track listing ==
1. "Introduction" – 0:35
2. "Hungerford" – 7:12
3. "Deviation Dance" – 3:24
4. "Two Little Pigeons" – 3:21
5. "Don Alfonso" – 3:14
6. "Open Piccadilly" – 4:55
7. "Feedback" – 1:11
8. "Vorblifa - Exit" - 6:31
9. "Insensatez" – 8:16
10. "A Conversation with Children/Jamaican Rumba" – 1:38
11. "Piccadilly with Goofs" – 1:20
12. "Rasa - Moods" – 20:09
13. "A Collective Improvisation" – 2:42
14. "I Am the Walrus" – 3:52
15. "The Rhythmic Hooter"– 2:28
16. "Lover Man" – 4:51
17. "Zoological Fun" – 1:03
18. "Little Triple One Shot" – 2:10
19. "That's Why Darkies Were Born" – 3:32
20. "A Series of Superbly Played Mellotron Codas" – 0:26
21. "Pretty Little Girl - Part One" - 2:36
22. "Pretty Little Girl - Part Two" - 2:38
23. "Mood" - 3:34
24. "Sonny Boy/Oh Mein Papa" - 2:59
- 10 is credited as "Conversation/Mango Walk" on some releases.
- On the CD reissue on See For Miles Records Ltd. (1994, UK), "Vorblifa - Exit" was taken off to fit the album on one CD, and 19 was retitled "That's Why... Darkies Were Born?" on the back cover, including a note by Lol reading, "A rather trite though obviously anti-racist pastiche of an old show tune."
- 21-24 are bonus tracks on the double-CD reissues on Air Mail Archive/Dandelion (Japan, 2008) and Esoteric Recordings/Cherry Red (UK, 2011). They were originally released as 7" singles on Polydor (1971, UK, 21-22) and Dandelion (1972, UK, 23-24). 21-23 are credited to The Coxhill-Bedford Duo, and 24 to Will Dandy & The Dandylettes. 23 and 24 are in reversed order on the Esoteric reissue, reflecting the A and B sides of the original single.

== Personnel ==
- Lol Coxhill – soprano saxophone, tenor saxophone, flute, percussions, maracas
- David Bedford – piano, organ
- Dave Dufort – drums
- Mike Oldfield – guitar
- Ed Speight – guitar
- Pierre Courbois – drums
- Burton Greene – piano
- Jasper van 't Hof – piano
- Robert Wyatt – percussions, vocals
- Kirwin Dear – guitar
