= Lativ =

Taiwanese casual clothing brand

- Product type: Casual lifestyle clothing
- Current owner: Mego Co. Ltd.
- Country: Taiwan
- Introduced: 2007
- Markets: Taiwan
- Website: www.lativ.com.tw

Lativ is a Taiwanese clothing brand founded in 2007. Inspired by brands such as Uniqlo and GU, Lativ designs clothes suitable for Taiwan's subtropical climate while incorporating diverse graphic elements. The brand has built its success primarily through online shopping rather than physical stores.

The name "Lativ" is derived from the phrase "Life should be attractive in various ways." In 2011, Lativ ranked first in sales volume among online clothing brands in Taiwan, generating a revenue of NT$4 billion (US$133 million).

== Controversies ==
On February 2, 2012, Lativ announced the removal of Country of Origin labels from its website. The movement sparked controversy among customers as the brand had initially built its reputation on producing clothing in Taiwan, which many viewed as a core brand value.

The decision to remove origin labels was prompted by Lativ's gradual shift of production to countries such as Vietnam, Indonesia, and China since 2010. Lativ cited challenges in the local textile industry, including an aging workforce and difficulties in quality control for small-scale production.

The announcement led to significant backlash from consumers, with some calling for a boycott of the brand. Critics accused Lativ of betraying its initial commitment to supporting Taiwan's textile industry, especially after the company's notable success.

On February 13, 2012, eleven days after the initial announcement, Lativ reversed its decision and resumed publishing Country of Origin information on its website.

== See also ==
- 50 Percent
- Namesake (brand)
- NET (brand)
