= Worshippers Come Nigh =

Studio album by Charles Brackeen Quartet
- Released: 1988
- Recorded: November 28, 1987
- Studio: Omega Audio, Dallas, TX
- Genre: Jazz
- Length: 55:32
- Label: Silkheart SHLP 111
- Producer: Dennis González

Charles Brackeen chronology
Attainment (1987)	Worshippers Come Nigh (1988)

Worshippers Come Nigh is the fourth album led by saxophonist Charles Brackeen which was recorded in 1987 and released on the Swedish Silkheart label.

== Reception ==
Professional ratings
Review scores
Source	Rating
AllMusic	4/5 stars
Los Angeles Times	4/4 stars
The Penguin Guide to Jazz	4/4 stars

The Penguin Guide to Jazz notes ""Worhippers on Nigh" is as exciting a jazz piece as any in the catalogue, underpinned by Hopkin's fine touch and Cyrille's percussion". In his review for AllMusic, Scott Yanow states "All of the Silkheart sets are worth picking up, but this one (due to its extra intensity and the five particularly strong Brackeen originals) gets a slight edge. Brackeen's passionate playing shows that free jazz was still very much alive (if underground) in the 1980s". In the Los Angeles Times Don Snowden wrote "No one has shone brighter than veteran saxophonist Charles Brackeen in the excellent series presenting "the new American jazz" from Sweden's Silkheart label. The compositions onWorshippers Come Nigh, Brackeen's third album taken from a 1987 session in Dallas, follow a simple pattern—brief unison readings of the themes and then off on extended, free-wheeling improvisations. But with Olu Dara's tart, pithy cornet giving a wild and woolly edge to Brackeen's spiritual tenor tone, drummer Andrew Cyrille's canny propulsion and bassist Fred Hopkins ranging through the sound like an All-Star center fielder, the results are uniformly heady and invigorating"

== Track listing ==
All compositions by Charles Brackeen.

1. "Worshippers Come Nigh" – 7:51
2. "Bannar" – 8:06
3. "Tiny Town" – 9:00
4. "Ible" – 10:51
5. "Cing Kong" – 10:28
6. "Newsstand" [Take 1] – 9:16 Bonus track on CD release

== Personnel ==
- Charles Brackeen – tenor saxophone
- Olu Dara – cornet
- Fred Hopkins – bass
- Andrew Cyrille – drums, congas
- Dennis González – pao de chuva
