= Live (The Group album) =

Live album by The Group
- Released: 2012
- Recorded: September 13, 1986
- Venue: Jazz Center of New York, New York City
- Genre: Free jazz
- Label: NoBusiness Records; NBCD50
- Producer: Danas Mikailionis

Live is a live album by the cooperative jazz ensemble known as The Group, featuring saxophonist Marion Brown, trumpeter Ahmed Abdullah, violinist Billy Bang, bassists Sirone and Fred Hopkins, and drummer Andrew Cyrille. The band's sole release, it was recorded on September 13, 1986, at the Jazz Center of New York in New York City, and was issued on LP and CD by NoBusiness Records in 2012, over 25 years after the concert.

Despite the fact that The Group had received favorable reviews, and its members were well-known musicians, the band failed to secure a recording contract. Ken Waxman of The New York City Jazz Record's suggested that because, in the mid-1980s, "neobop had replaced fusion as the popular jazz genre," The Group was viewed as being "too outside." He commented: "Luck and circumstances determine what bands become famous. Despite overall excellence, destiny" was not on the band's side, as it was "too far behind or too far ahead for contemporary popularity."

== Reception ==
Professional ratings
Review scores
Source	Rating
All About Jazz	3/5 stars
The Free Jazz Collective	4.5/5 stars
Tom Hull – on the Web	A

In a review for All About Jazz, John Sharpe wrote: "While this isn't the place to look for the best work by any of these men, it's not possible to find them together anywhere else, and with Bang, Brown, Hopkins and Sirone all deceased, for that alone it should be cherished."

The Free Jazz Collective's Martin Schray stated: "it seems hard to believe that such a band was not able to get a record deal because... we are talking about a supergroup here... This is a wonderful record, a true missing link."

A writer for London Jazz News commented: "After so many years, it is wonderful to have a document of this powerful band tearing through an hour and a quarter of enthralling and diverse jazz."

Jason Bivins of Point of Departure called the album "a vintage slice of heady, emotional jazz from something of an 'all-star' combo," and wrote: "it's not fair to call this music free jazz or free improvisation, since each of the five tracks here is compositional in the robust sense, trading not so much in heavy structure as rich thematic material... Marvelous stuff."

In a review for Tiny Mix Tapes, Clifford Allen stated: " it's clear from Live that free music and the tradition had a lot to say to one another, and that the results could be both complex and breathtakingly powerful. It's better that we hear The Group a quarter-century late than never."

Cult MTL's Lawrence Joseph called The Group "a brand-name, New York, free-jazz supergroup," and commented: "Was there a better free jazz rhythm section than bassist Sirone with Andrew Cyrille on drums? Actually, there was, when second bassist Fred Hopkins was added to replace Sirone, who'd announced that he would miss the gig but showed up to play anyway."

Writing for The List, Stewart Smith described the album as "gloriously creative and soulful... from [a] dream team of first generation free jazzers," and remarked: "Tuneful, swinging and thrillingly inventive, this is gloriously creative and soulful music."

Derek Taylor of Dusted Magazine wrote: "Despite glowing press, a decent string of gigs and a strongly shared commitment to collaboration, the band wasn't destined to last... The music that survives makes that sad fact all the sadder, but the proof of The Group's greatness is ripe for reconsideration and commendation however belatedly."

== CD track listing ==
1. "Joann's Green Satin Dress" (Butch Morris) – 8:39
2. "Goodbye Pork Pie Hat" (Charles Mingus) – 18:20
3. "La Placita" (Marion Brown) – 18:26 (bonus track on CD)
4. "Shift Below" (Billy Bang) – 6:00 (bonus track on CD)
5. "Amanpondo" (Miriam Makeba) – 25:16

== Personnel ==
- Marion Brown – alto saxophone
- Ahmed Abdullah – trumpet, flugelhorn
- Billy Bang – violin
- Sirone – bass
- Fred Hopkins – bass
- Andrew Cyrille – drums
