= Geleven Plaza =

- 桃知道
- Location: 301, Nanping Road, Taoyuan District, Taoyuan, Taiwan
- Coordinates: 25°1′6″N 121°17′59″E
- Opened: 23 September 2024
- Floors: 4
- Website: https://www.g11.com.tw/

Geleven Plaza (Chinese: 桃知道; pinyin: Táo Zhīdào) is a shopping center in Taoyuan District, Taoyuan, Taiwan that opened on 23 September 2024. It is the first and largest shopping mall in the Taoyuan Zhongzheng Arts and Cultural Business District. The main core stores of the mall include Vieshow Cinemas, Mister Donut, Bandai, and Tsutaya Bookstore.

== Floor guide ==
Floor	Features
Level 4	Vieshow Cinemas
Level 3	Bandai and toys
Level 2	Restaurants
Level 1	J&G Fried Chicken, 7-11

== See also ==
- List of tourist attractions in Taiwan
