= Alvin Fielder =

American jazz drummer (1935–2019)

- Born: November 23, 1935; Meridian, Mississippi, U.S.
- Died: January 5, 2019 (aged 83); Jackson, Mississippi
- Genres: Jazz
- Occupation: Musician
- Instrument: Drummer

Alvin Leroy Fielder Jr (November 23, 1935 – January 5, 2019) was an American jazz drummer. He was a charter member of the Association for the Advancement of Creative Musicians (AACM), Black Arts Music Society, Improvisational Arts band, and was a founding faculty member of the Louis "Satchmo" Armstrong Summer Jazz Camp.

== Early life ==
Fielder was born in Meridian, Mississippi on November 23, 1935. His mother played the violin and piano; his father, Alvin Sr, played the cornet and was a pharmacist by profession. Alvin Jr's brother, William Butler Fielder, became a trumpeter and was professor of jazz studies at Rutgers University.

Fielder initially learned the piano as a young child, but stopped and did not regain an interest in music until, at the age 12, he heard drummer Max Roach on record. He had drum lessons from Ed Blackwell while studying pharmacology at Xavier University of Louisiana, and then continued his degree at Texas Southern University while maintaining his musical development by taking lessons with local drummers and performing at night. Fielder completed his pharmacology studies with a master's degree from the University of Illinois at Chicago.

== Later life and career ==
In Chicago, Fielder played with Sun Ra during 1959 and 1960. Encouraged by fellow musicians Muhal Richard Abrams and Beaver Harris, Fielder became more experimental in his playing, and went on to be a charter member of the Association for the Advancement of Creative Musicians (AACM). The AACM's first released recording, Roscoe Mitchell's Sound, featured Fielder. In the mid- to late 1960s, he played in his own trio with Fred Anderson and bassist/cellist Lester Lashley, and worked part-time as a pharmacist.

In 1969, he returned home to Mississippi. Fielder took responsibility for managing the family business, became involved in political activism, and continued to pursue his passion for music. In 1971 he met John Reese and helped develop the Black Arts Music Society (BAMS). Fielder was instrumental in bringing many AACM and other musicians to Mississippi.

In 1975, Fielder began working with Kidd Jordan in what became the Improvisational Arts band, which featured various musicians over three decades, and appeared at the New Orleans Jazz and Heritage Festival every year from 1975 to 2008. In 1995, he participated as a founding faculty member in the Louis "Satchmo" Armstrong Summer Jazz Camp.

He recorded in 1987 with Ahmed Abdullah, Charles Brackeen, and Dennis Gonzalez, and continued exploring in the free jazz vein in the 1990s with Joel Futterman, Kidd Jordan, and others. He toured with Andrew Lamb in 2002. In 2007, the Clean Feed label released his sole album as a leader, titled A Measure of Vision.

In 2012, Fielder was awarded the Resounding Vision Award by Nameless Sound in Houston. He died, of complications from congestive heart failure and pneumonia, in Jackson, Mississippi, on January 5, 2019.

== Discography ==
As leader

- A Measure of Vision (Clean Feed, 2007)

With Damon Smith

- From-to-From with David Dove and Jason Jackson (Balance Point, 2013)
- Song for Chico (Balance Point, 2016)
- The Shape Finds Its Own Space with Frode Gjerstad (FMR, 2016)
- After Effects with Danny Kamins and Joe Hertenstein (FMR, 2017)
- Six Situations with Joe McPhee (Not Two, 2017)

With Joel Futterman, Kidd Jordan

- New Orleans Rising (Konnex, 1997)
- Nickelsdorfer Konfrontationen (Silkheart, 1997)
- Southern Extreme (Drimala, 1998)
- Live at the Tampere Jazz Happening 2000 (Charles Lester, 2004)
- Live at the Guelph Jazz Festival 2011 (Creative Collective, 2011)

With Joel Futterman, Ike Levin

- Resolving Doors (Charles Lester, 2004)
- Live at the Blue Monk (Charles Lester, 2006)
- Traveling Through Now (Charles Lester, 2008)
- Through the Mirror (Charles Lester, 2014)

With Dennis Gonzalez

- Debenge-Debenge (Silkheart, 1988)
- Namesake (Silkheart, 1987)
- The Gift of Discernment (Not Two, 2008)
- Resurrection and Life (Ayler, 2011)

With Kidd Jordan, Peter Kowald

- Live in New Orleans (NoBusiness, 2013)
- Trio and Duo in New Orleans (NoBusiness, 2013)

With Roscoe Mitchell

- Sound (Delmark, 1966)
- Before There Was Sound (Nessa, 2011)

With others

- Ahmed Abdullah, Liquid Magic (Silkheart, 1987)
- Charles Brackeen, Bannar (Silkheart, 1987)
- Kidd Jordan, Masters of Improvisation (Valid, 2018)
- Peter Kowald, Off the Road (RogueArt, 2007)
