= Bannar (album) =

Studio album by Charles Brackeen
- Released: 1987
- Recorded: February 13, 1987
- Studio: Omega Audio, Dallas, TX
- Genre: Jazz
- Length: 53:45
- Label: Silkheart SHLP 105
- Producer: Charles Brackeen

Charles Brackeen chronology
Rhythm X (1973)	Bannar (1987)	Attainment (1988)

Bannar is the second album led by saxophonist Charles Brackeen, recorded in 1987 and released on the Swedish Silkheart label.

== Reception ==
Professional ratings
Review scores
Source	Rating
AllMusic	4/5 stars
The Penguin Guide to Jazz	3/4 stars

The Penguin Guide to Jazz notes, "If Coltrane was the overdetermining presence for most saxophonists of the period, Brackeen seems virtually untouched, working instead on a vein reminiscent of Ornette Coleman (as on the stop-start melodic stutter of 'Three Monks Suite') and Albert Ayler ('Allah'). He favours a high, slightly pinched tone, his soprano frequently resembles clarinet, and his tenor work is punctuated by Aylerish sallies into the 'false' upper register. The 'Three Monks Suite' is wholly composed and Brackeen really lets go as a soloist on Bannar only with 'Story', a limping melody with enough tightly packed musical information to fuel two superb solos from the horns". In his review for AllMusic, Scott Yanow states, "Intriguing and often intense music that effectively uses simple folk melodies as vehicles for improvising".

== Track listing ==
All compositions by Charles Brackeen.

1. "Three Monks Suite: Chaos/Sugar Doll/Waltz with Me/Snow Shoes/Hush and Stop/Cas-Ba/Cheers" – 8:44
2. "Open" – 7:56
3. "Allah" – 8:24
4. "Stone Blue" – 9:36
5. "Story" – 9:27
6. "Open" [Take 2] – 9:38 Bonus track on CD release

== Personnel ==
- Charles Brackeen – tenor saxophone, soprano saxophone
- Dennis González – trumpet, flugelhorn
- Malachi Favors – bass
- Alvin Fielder – drums
