= Traveling the Spaceways =

Studio album by Ahmed Abdullah's Dispersions of the Spirit of Ra
- Released: 2004
- Recorded: February 27, 2004
- Studio: Clinton Studios, New York City
- Genre: Free jazz
- Length: 1:10:36
- Label: Planet Arts Records; 100324
- Producer: Ahmed Abdullah, Thomas Bellino

Ahmed Abdullah chronology
Song of Time: Live at the Vision Festival (2004)	Traveling the Spaceways (2004)	Tara's Song (2005)

Traveling the Spaceways is an album by trumpeter Ahmed Abdullah. A tribute to his former employer, Sun Ra, it was recorded on February 27, 2004, at Clinton Studios in New York City, and was released later that year by Planet Arts Records. On the album, Abdullah is joined by members of the band known as Dispersions of the Spirit of Ra: saxophonists Salim Washington and Alex Harding, trumpeter Owuor Arunga, trombonist Craig Harris, violinist Billy Bang, guitarist Masujaa (Hugh Riley), vocalists Miles Griffith and Monique Ngozi Nri, bassist Radu Oluwu Ben Judah (Richard Williams), and drummer Cody Moffett.

== Reception ==
Professional ratings
Review scores
Source	Rating
AllMusic	4.5/5 stars
All About Jazz	4/5 stars

In a review for AllMusic, Alain Drouot wrote: "Traveling the Spaceways is as beautiful an homage to Sun Ra as it gets... The music sways with style, and the voicings are often enthralling... With this remarkable outing, Abdullah outdid himself and achieved remarkable results that should not be overlooked. Back on Saturn, the master can be proud of this tribute."

Chris Kelsey of JazzTimes stated: "The arrangements are excellent... The ensemble strikes a good balance between tight and loose... Ra's mysticism isn't my cup of tea, but his compositions are, and Abdullah's group does a fine job giving them renewed life."

Writing for All About Jazz, Rex Butters commented: "Abdullah initiated the project as a result of a dream vision in which Sun Ra appeared to him and urged him to fire up the ship once again... Abdullah acquits himself of Ra's beyond-the-grave injunction with Traveling the Spaceways, producing a valuable addition to Ra-ism and managing to capture the celestial spirit of the Founder." AAJ's Rico Cleffi remarked: "This is music that conveys a deep sincerity. Bands like this one might well be able to keep not only Sun Ra's memory—but all that is good about jazz—alive."

In an article for JazzWord, Ken Waxman wrote: "the plus usually overcome the minuses in this salute to the musician who had a massive influence on the trumpeter's life. 'Celebrating our ancestors is what makes us whole', he has written, and Traveling the Spaceways is an appropriate tribute."

== Track listing ==
"Enlightenment" composed by Hobart Dotson and Sun Ra. Remaining tracks composed by Sun Ra.

1. "We Travel the Spaceways" – 7:17
2. "21st Century, Pt. 1" – 3:11
3. "21st Century, Pt. 2" – 1:47
4. "21st Century, Pt. 3" – 8:20
5. "Dancing Shadows" – 5:33
6. "Love in Outerspace" – 8:01
7. "Enlightenment" – 9:35
8. "East of Uz" – 8:34
9. "New Horizons" – 10:16
10. "They Plan" (Dedicated to David Baker) – 8:02

== Personnel ==
- Ahmed Abdullah – vocals, trumpet
- Salim Washington – tenor saxophone
- Alex Harding – baritone saxophone
- Owuor Arunga – trumpet
- Craig Harris – trombone
- Billy Bang – violin
- Masujaa (Hugh Riley) – guitar
- Miles Griffith – vocals
- Monique Ngozi Nri – vocals
- Radu Oluwu Ben Judah (Richard Williams) – bass
- Cody Moffett – drums
- Louis Reyes Rivera – poetry
