= Ahmed Abdullah and the Solomonic Quintet =

1988 studio album

Studio album by Ahmed Abdullah and the Solomonic Quintet
- Released: 1988
- Recorded: December 3–4, 1987
- Studio: A&R Recording, NYC
- Genre: Jazz
- Length: 52:30
- Label: Silkheart; SHLP 109
- Producer: Philippa Jordan

Ahmed Abdullah chronology
Liquid Magic (1987)	Ahmed Abdullah and the Solomonic Quintet (1988)	Dedication (1998)

Ahmed Abdullah and the Solomonic Quintet is an album by trumpeter Ahmed Abdullah's featuring saxophonist David S. Ware, guitarist Masujaa, bassist Fred Hopkins, and drummer Charles Moffett, recorded in late 1987 and released on the Swedish Silkheart label.

== Reception ==
Professional ratings
Review scores
Source	Rating
AllMusic	3.5/5 stars
The Penguin Guide to Jazz	3/4 stars

The Penguin Guide to Jazz states that "the leader is outclassed by his own band... The rhythm section is wonderfully alert and inventive with Masuhjaa's guitar an especially individual presence, and Ware is a gritty improviser" In his review on AllMusic, Ron Wynn states: "Trumpeter Ahmed Abdullah sprays around dissonant solos and spearheads an often frenzied set that was his second release for Silkheart. The lineup was exceptional, notably the powerful tenor saxophonist David S. Ware, dynamic bassist Fred Hopkins, and underrated drummer Charles Moffet".

== Track listing ==
All compositions by Ahmed Abdullah except where noted.

1. "African Songbird" – 7:03
2. "Gypsy Lady" (Charles Moffett) – 4:55
3. "The Search" – 6:48
4. "Canto II" – 4:54
5. "Khaluma" – 7:16
6. "The Dance We Do" – 7:28
7. "Wishbone Suite" (Moffett) – 5:27
8. "The Dance We Do" [Take 1] – 8:39 Bonus track on CD

== Personnel ==
- Ahmed Abdullah – trumpet, flugelhorn, voice,
- David S. Ware – tenor saxophone
- Masuhjaa – guitar
- Fred Hopkins – bass
- Charles Moffett – drums
