= A Measure of Vision =

Live album by Alvin Fielder
- Released: 2007
- Recorded: December 27, 2005; March 17, 2006
- Venues: Mesquite Arts Center, Mesquite, Texas; Royal Lane Baptist Church, Dallas, Texas
- Genre: Free jazz
- Length: 1:09:04
- Labels: Clean Feed; CF071CD

A Measure of Vision is a live album by the Alvin Fielder Trio, led by the drummer Fielder with the trumpeter Dennis González and pianist Chris Parker. It was recorded in 2005 and 2006 in Texas, and was released in 2007 by Clean Feed Records. González's sons Aaron (double bass) and Stefan (vibes and drums) appear on several tracks. Though active as a musician since the mid-1960s, the album is Fielder's only release as a leader. (He died in 2019.)

== Reception ==
Professional ratings
Review scores
Source	Rating
AllMusic	4/5 stars
All About Jazz	3.5/5 stars
All About Jazz	3.5/5 stars
The Free Jazz Collective	3/5 stars
Tom Hull – on the Web	B+

In a review for AllMusic, Scott Yanow wrote, "The music on A Measure of Vision, even at its freest, is somewhat mellow and lyrical. Dennis Gonzalez displays a thoughtful style and a warm sound on trumpet... while pianist Chris Parker gives a modal feel to some of the songs... This set contains plenty of surprises along the way and is rewarded by repeat listenings. Recommended."

Troy Collins of All About Jazz wrote, "Fielder and company share equally in the responsibility of keeping these mutable frameworks on track. Negotiating the spaces between them, the trio brings a casual aesthetic to their uncluttered conversations... An agreeable session full of open space, rich lyricism and adventurous improvisation, A Measure of Vision may have been a long time in coming, but some things are worth the wait."

A writer for The Free Jazz Collective commented, "[T]hese gentlemen know what music is: they quote freely from the jazz songbook, yet bring it at times to a high level of abstraction, blending genres... Fielder is strong, an economical drummer who accentuates with precision."

== Track listing ==
1. "Your Sons and Daughters Shall Prophesy" – 4:03
2. "À Mon Frère" – 4:54
3. "Camel" – 12:23
4. "Max-Well" – 5:37
5. "Ripe for Vision" – 15:57
6. "Your Young Men Shall See Visions" – 6:52
7. "Time No Time" – 4:55
8. "Your Old Men Shall Dream Dreams" – 7:37
9. "The Cecil Taylor – Sunny Murray Dancing Lesson" – 6:46

== Personnel ==
- Alvin Fielder – drums, percussion
- Dennis González – trumpet
- Chris Parker – piano
- Aaron González – double bass (tracks 3, 5)
- Stefan González – drums (tracks 5, 6), vibes (track 5)
