= Namesake (webcomic) =

Fantasy webcomic

- Cover of the third print collection

Publication information
- Schedule: Three times a week
- Format: Ongoing series
- Genre: Fantasy
- Publication date: September 2010 – present

Creative team
- Created by: Megan Lavey-Heaton and Isabelle Melançon

Namesake is a fantasy webcomic by Megan Lavey-Heaton and Isabelle Melançon. In Namesake, many worlds from other works of fiction are real parallel universes, and people with certain names can travel to certain worlds.

== Premise ==
In Namesake, a Namesake is a person who can magically travel to other worlds based on their name. These worlds are established worlds from fairy tales, literature, film, and other media, but in Namesake are real parallel universes. Each world has a name associated with it – Wendys travel to Neverland and Alices travel to Wonderland. The main character of Namesake is Emma Crewe, a young woman from Toronto who doesn't read, or watch TV, or even have the internet at home. She discovers that she is a Namesake, but travels to Oz and is expected to fill the role of a Dorothy (of which several people with that name have visited and helped Oz before). Emma has to deal with Oz's troubles, figure out how and why she went there, and how to get back to her sister.

Emma's younger sister Elaine is also a character: she has "writer" powers, allowing her to affect the outcome of events. Other characters include Ozma and Emma's best friend Ben, as well as a society of Namesakes called Calliope, and their enemies the "Rippers" who have sold their own names.

Namesake uses color sparingly against mainly black-and-white art. Color is used to emphasise important items or to demonstrate when magic is being used.

== Creators ==
Namesake is created by Megan Lavey-Heaton and Isabelle Melançon. Lavey-Heaton is a journalist, designer, and writer from Pennsylvania who has been a co-editor of the Valor fairy tale comic anthology and a freelance book designer for Hiveworks. Melançon is a French-Canadian artist who lives in Ottawa; she has been published in several comics anthologies, including Womanthology, and is co-CEO of Hiveworks.

The creators described a frustration with modern adaptations of fairy tales and an exhaustion with "grimdark" retellings, and said that they started planning the story in 2008. They said in a 2017 interview that the majority of the creative process is "hashed out through daily chats, monthly story meetings, and poring over the sketches and final pages to tweak the dialogue... After we've hashed out the story, either from chats or the rough script, Isa [Melaçon] does a series of blue-line sketches that I approve. Then Isa inks the pages and sends them to our amazing colorist Gisele [Weaver] to flat. Once Isa has the pages back, she shades them and passes them on to me. I letter the pages in InDesign and do a second draft of the dialogue based on the sketches and the original script/story chat. Isa approves the final dialogue, then I export the pages for the website."

== Publication ==
Namesake is published on its own website. It started in September 2010 and typically updates three times a week. It has also been collected in printed volumes, with at least three books as of 2017. As of March 2021, the comic is still updating.

== Reception ==
Namesake has been recommended by Bustle, The Booklist Reader, and The Daily Dot.

Reviewing Namesake for ComicsAlliance, Emma Lawson said it was clear the creators planned heavily before starting Namesake and this showed in the level of world building and detail. Lawson said that "Namesake weaves in other stories we know, such as Alice in Wonderland and The Wizard of Oz, in very deft and exciting ways. It's a comic for big book nerds, and it's delightful." Lawson also praised Melançon's art, saying, "Her faces are stunningly expressive" and that "when Emma first lands in Oz, everything is black and white except for her purple blouse and the yellow brick road. Back in Toronto, her sister and friend interrogate Jack, who's sporting a bloody red hand. It's minimal, but very powerful."

Reviewing the comic for io9 in 2013, Lauren Davis said that while "webcomics about secret societies of people born to mystical powers are a dime a dozen, Namesake benefits by treating its own lore with surprising depth and creating a beautiful (if revisionist) picture of Oz." Davis called Namesake "a complex tale of magic, family, loyalty, and yes, the importance of names" and said that "Melançon's artwork, which bears touches of Victorian and Art Nouveau illustration, is gorgeously suited to this fantasy world." However, she did feel that the story on Earth was "much slower and riddled with exposition".

Reviewing the comic for CBR.com in 2011, shortly after it started, Brian Cronin said that "Heaton has really made Emma a fully realized, well-developed character" and that "Melançon has a very appealing art style", and said of the plot it "has built up somewhat slowly, but it is really picking up steam in recent weeks."
