= Liquid Magic =

Studio album by Ahmed Abdullah Quartet
- Released: 1987
- Recorded: February 16, 1987
- Studio: Omega Audio, Dallas, TX
- Genre: Jazz
- Length: 59:08
- Label: Silkheart; SHLP 104
- Producer: Ahmed Abdullah

Ahmed Abdullah chronology
Live at Ali's Alley (1980)	Liquid Magic (1987)	Ahmed Abdullah and the Solomonic Quintet (1988)

Liquid Magic is an album by trumpeter Ahmed Abdullah's Quartet featuring saxophonist Charles Brackeen, bassist Malachi Favors, and drummer Alvin Fielder which was recorded in 1987 and released on the Swedish Silkheart label.

== Reception ==
Professional ratings
Review scores
Source	Rating
AllMusic	4/5 stars
The Penguin Guide to Jazz	3.5/4 stars
Tom Hull – on the Web	A−

The Penguin Guide to Jazz states: "Tersely organised the six tunes on Liquid Magic reflect a Colemanesque feel which suits the folk-like melodies. But the trumpeter is, frankly, the least impressive player here: Brackeen's fierce yet lightly shaded solos make a more powerful impression, and Favors and Felder generate a loose but convincingly swinging pulse" In his review on AllMusic, Michael G. Nastos states: "Ex-Sun Ra trumpeter/flügelhornist Abdullah expresses his brand of jazz in a modern way with mainstream swing and progressive overtones. Tenor saxophonist Charles Brackeen, bassist Malachi Favors, and drummer Alvin Fielder are all fine improvisers and jazz professionals. Brackeen's salty, dry Texas tenor blue hues mix and match especially well with Abdullah's sound, which ranges from burnished Dizzy Gillespie phrases to Don Cherry's smearing techniques. In fact, Abdullah is as close to Cherry's style and stance as anyone, and that's a good thing ... When Abdullah records, albeit infrequently, the consistency of his musicianship is ever present and accounted for, as on this delightful recording. Highly recommended".

== Track listing ==
All compositions by Ahmed Abdullah except where noted.

1. "Mayibue" – 7:25
2. "Reflections on a Mystic" – 5:09
3. "Ebony Queen" – 8:08
4. "Mystery of Two" (Sun Ra) – 3:14
5. "Liquid Magic/The Ruler" – 10:40
6. "Walk with God" (Kola) – 6:49
7. "The Ruler" [Take 2] – 9:15 Bonus track on CD
8. "Ebony Queen" [Take 2] – 8:28 Bonus track on CD

== Personnel ==
- Ahmed Abdullah – trumpet, flugelhorn, piano,
- Charles Brackeen – tenor saxophone
- Malachi Favors – bass
- Alvin Fielder – drums
