= Attainment (album) =

Studio album by Charles Brackeen Quartet
- Released: 1988
- Recorded: November 29, 1987
- Studio: Omega Audio, Dallas, TX
- Genre: Jazz
- Length: 55:53
- Label: Silkheart SHLP 110
- Producer: Dennis González

Charles Brackeen chronology
Bannar (1987)	Attainment (1988)	Worshippers Come Nigh (1987)

Attainment is the third album led by saxophonist Charles Brackeen, recorded in 1987 and released on the Swedish Silkheart label.

== Reception ==
Professional ratings
Review scores
Source	Rating
AllMusic	3/5 stars
The Penguin Guide to Jazz	3/4 stars

Comparing it to his other albums recorded for the same label The Penguin Guide to Jazz notes, "Attainment is the least satisfying, but only because there are no solos on par with "Worshippers" and "Story". However it does include the fascinating sax/bass/drums trio "House of Gold"." In his review for AllMusic, Scott Yanow states, "Brackeen's intense sound has a soul of its own, and his playing on the four lengthy originals (with strong contributions by bassist Fred Hopkins, drummer Andrew Cyrille and the underrated cornetist Olu Dara) is quite original. Intense yet fulfilling music".

== Track listing ==
All compositions by Charles Brackeen.

1. "Attainment" – 8:53
2. "Prince of Night" – 13:20
3. "New Stand" – 10:03
4. "House of Gold" – 10:29
5. "Yogan Love" – 13:08 Bonus track on CD release

== Personnel ==
- Charles Brackeen – tenor saxophone, voice
- Olu Dara – cornet, voice, berimbau
- Fred Hopkins – bass, toy drum, voice
- Andrew Cyrille – drums, congas, voice
- Dennis González – pao de chuva, voice
