= NET (brand) =

Asian casual clothing brand

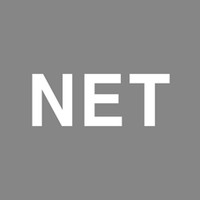

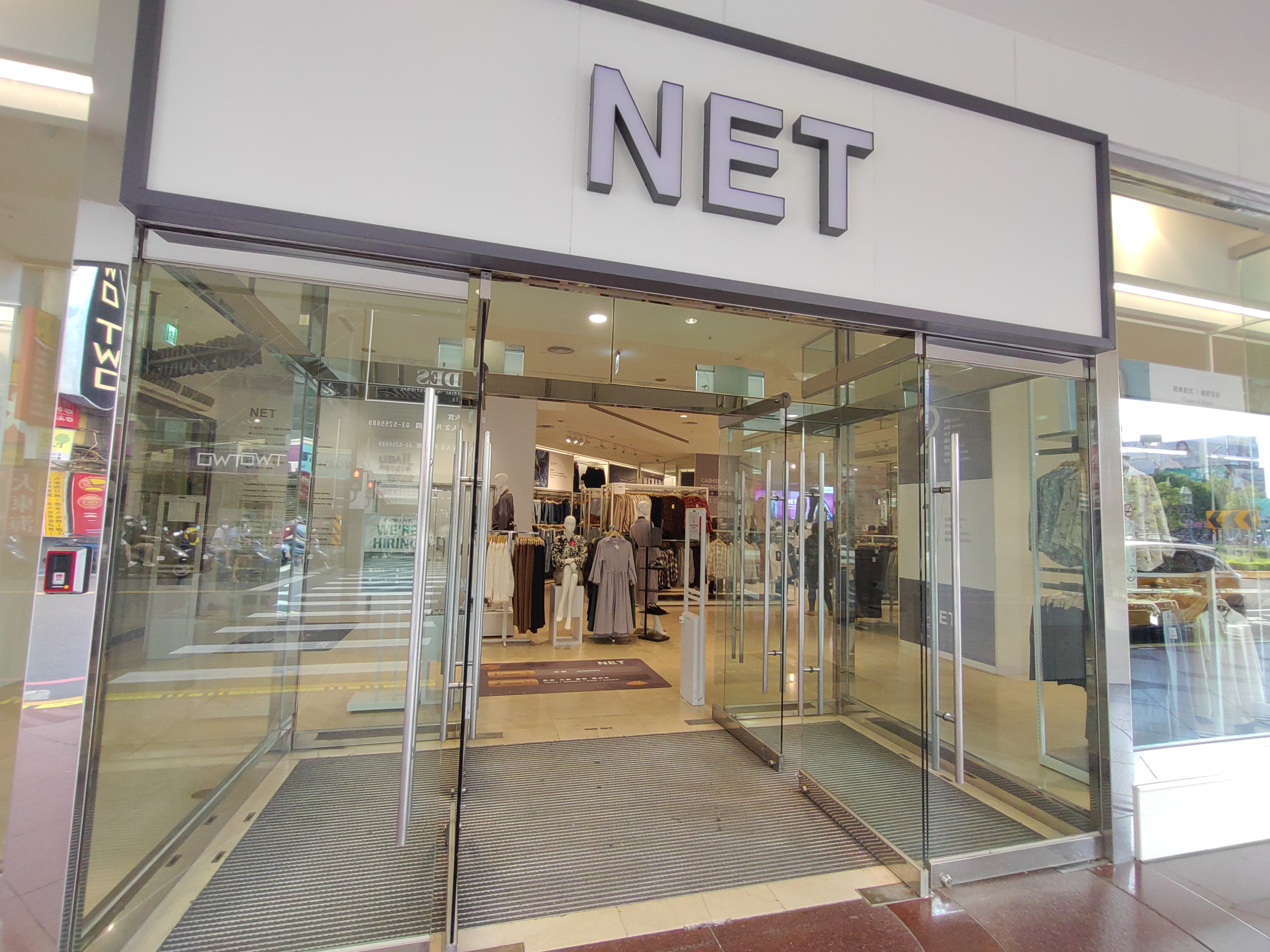
- The storefront of a NET clothing shop in Hsinchu City
- Product type: Casual lifestyle clothing
- Current owner: Ju Fu Fashion Development Corp.
- Country: Taiwan
- Introduced: 1991; 35 years ago
- Markets: Taiwan
- Website: www.net-fashion.net

NET is a Taiwan-owned clothing company that makes mass-market casual clothing and other items, selling the bulk of its products in Taiwan. It was founded in 1991 and as of 2024, had 144 stores across Taiwan.

== History ==
In the 1960s and 1970s, the Taiwan clothing industry was booming, with many garments manufactured in Taiwan. However, as the volume of garments increased, some garments did not meet the requirements of foreign buyers, or the garments had defects or had transportation delays.

However, Taiwanese manufacturers had to face the pressure of inventory accumulation due to returns from foreign original manufacturers. The Housewives Shopping Mall mainly sold ready-made clothing for export. In order to solve the problem of insufficient supply, it began to invest in a business model focusing on self-developed products and designed clothing to sell locally.

In October 1991, Taiwan's first self-created clothing brand NET was established in Housewives Mall.

In 1993, Housewives Mall opened its first flagship store on Nanjing East Road, Taipei City.

In 1996, the Housewife Shopping Mall was renamed Jia Fang Clothing Co., Ltd. (J-fun Corp.).

In 1997, Jia Fang Clothing entered the information industry and established the large-scale information store "T.T. Station Information Plaza" on the first floor and first basement floor (Shude Building) of No. 36, Section 1, Zhongxiao West Road, Zhongzheng District, Taipei City.

In 2008, Jiafang Fashion was renamed Ju Fu Fashion Development Corp.

== See also ==
- 50 Percent
- Lativ
- Namesake (brand)
