= Charles Brackeen =

American jazz saxophonist (1940–2021)

- Born: March 13, 1940; Eufaula, Oklahoma, United States
- Died: November 5, 2021 Carson, California
- Genres: Jazz
- Instrument: Saxophone
- Labels: Strata-East, Silkheart

Charles Brackeen (March 13, 1940, in Eufaula, Oklahoma, United States – November 5, 2021, Carson, California) was an American jazz saxophonist who primarily played tenor saxophone, but also played soprano saxophone. He was previously married to pianist Joanne Brackeen, with whom he had four children.

Brackeen originally studied violin and piano before switching to saxophone at the age of 10. He played in a recording with members of the Ornette Coleman Quartet in 1968 and on Jazz Composer's Orchestra recordings by Don Cherry (1973), Leroy Jenkins (1975), and Paul Motian for ECM (1978 and 1979). He recorded again as a leader in 1987, when he recorded three albums for Silkheart Records.

== Discography ==
=== As Leader ===
- Rhythm X (Strata-East, 1968)
- Bannar (Silkheart Records, 1987)
- Attainment (Silkheart, 1987)
- Worshippers Come Nigh (Silkheart, 1987)

=== As sideman ===
with Ahmed Abdullah

- Liquid Magic (Silkheart, 1987)

with Don Cherry

- Relativity Suite (JCOA, 1973)

with Dennis González

- Namesake (Silkheart, 1987)
- Debenge, Debenge (Silkheart, 1988)
- The Desert Wind (Silkheart, 1989)

with Ronald Shannon Jackson's Decoding Society

- Eye On You (About Time, 1980)
- Nasty (Moers Music, 1981)

with Leroy Jenkins

- For Players Only (JCOA, 1975)

with Melodic Art-Tet

- Melodic Art–Tet (NoBusiness, 1974 [2013])

with Paul Motian

- Dance (ECM, 1977)
- Le Voyage (ECM, 1979)

with William Parker

- Through Acceptance of the Mystery Peace (Centering Records, 1974–79)
