= Namesake (album) =

Studio album by Dennis González New Dallas Sextet
- Released: 1987
- Recorded: February 13, 1987
- Studio: Omega Audio, Dallas, TX
- Genre: Jazz
- Length: 57:50
- Label: Silkheart SHLP 106
- Producer: Dennis González

Dennis González chronology
Stefan (1987)	Namesake (1987)	Catechism (1987)

Namesake is an album led by trumpeter Dennis González which was recorded in 1987 and released on the Swedish Silkheart label.

== Reception ==
Professional ratings
Review scores
Source	Rating
AllMusic	3/5 stars
The Penguin Guide to Jazz	3.5/4 stars

Comparing it with González previous album, The Penguin Guide to Jazz notes "Namesake only suffers by comparison, but it shouldn't be missed". In his review for AllMusic, Brian Olewnick states "Namesake doesn't really happen, and it's hard to pinpoint exactly why – the all-Gonzalez-originals are essentially heads to set up solos rather than fully fleshed-out ensemble passages. And while those solos are almost all strong, the music resolutely remains less than the sum of the parts".

== Track listing ==
All compositions by Dennis González except where noted.

1. "Namesake" – 15:46
2. "The Separation of Stones" – 9:15
3. "Johnny – Johnny" – 8:14 Bonus track on CD
4. "Hamba Khale Qhawe" – 1:35
5. "Four Pigs and a Bird's Nest" (James Sharper, Dennis González) – 5:37
6. "Hymn for Mbizo" – 11:53
7. "Good Friends" – 5:30

== Personnel ==
- Dennis González – trumpet, pocket trumpet, flugelhorn, pao de chuva, Pakistani bells, kalimba, vocals
- Ahmed Abdullah – trumpet, fluegelhorn, balafon
- Douglas Ewart – bass clarinet, alto saxophone
- Charles Brackeen – tenor saxophone, congas
- Malachi Favors – bass, vocals
- Alvin Fielder – drums, percussion
