= Dennis González =

American jazz trumpeter (1954–2022)

- Born: August 15, 1954; Abilene, Texas, U.S.
- Died: March 15, 2022 (aged 67) Dallas, Texas, U.S.
- Genres: Avant-garde jazz, free jazz
- Occupations: Musician, artist, writer, educator
- Instrument: Trumpet
- Labels: daagnim, Clean Feed
- Website: Dennis González on Bandcamp

Dennis González, often credited Dennis Gonzalez (August 15, 1954 – March 15, 2022), was an American jazz trumpeter, artist, and educator from Texas. He hosted Miles Out on KERA-FM for over twenty years.

== Early life ==
González was born in Abilene, Texas, on August 15, 1954. He relocated to Oak Cliff in 1976. He later established the Dallas Association for Avant-Garde and Neo Impressionistic Music (daagnim) in the late 1970s, doing so at the suggestion of Anthony Braxton and Art Lande. The daagnim organization, which functioned both as a group of musicians and as a record label, was based on and named after the AACM.

== Career ==
González' primary musical instrument was the trumpet (including B♭, C, and pocket trumpets), though he has also played drums, flute, synthesizer, and baritone saxophone. AllMusic describes González as "[a] talented trumpeter who has recorded a consistently rewarding string of lesser-known dates," whose "playing falls between advanced hard bop and free jazz."

The Penguin Guide to Jazz observed that González' recordings during the 1980s for Silkheart Records represented "part of a determined effort to wrest creative initiative back from New York and the West Coast." The Penguin Guide commented among González' greatest achievements was having coaxed saxophonist Charles Brackeen out of retirement during the late 1980s, and that by the early 1990s, González "more than ever before... seems the heir of Don Cherry." Additionally, Henry Grimes' November 2003 appearance on González' Nile River Suite was the bassist's first official recording in more than thirty-five years.

González began working for Dallas radio station KERA-FM in 1978. There, he hosted a music program called Miles Out. He ultimately worked with KERA for 21 years, but left after the station had largely shifted from music programming to a news and talk format. González was also employed as a teacher and taught at Spence Middle School, Woodrow Wilson High School, and North Dallas High School.

For several years during the 1990s, González retired from jazz performance and recording. In 2001, he formed a trio, Yells at Eels, with his sons Aaron (double bass) and Stefan (drums, vibraphone). In 2010, the trio recorded with Ariel Pink, appearing on the song "Hot Body Rub" on the album Before Today, and on a vinyl EP, Ariel Pink With Added Pizzazz. González's most recent offering with Yells at Eels is a collaboration with Fort Worth experimental drone rock outfit Pinkish Black, entitled Vanishing Light in the Tunnel of Dreams, which was released in May 2020.

== Personal life ==
González was married to Carol until his death. Together, they had two children: Aaron and Stefan.

González died on March 15, 2022, at Methodist Dallas Medical Center in Dallas. He was 67, and suffered from several unspecified health issues prior to his death.

== Discography ==
As leader

- Air Light (Sleep Sailor) (Daagnim 01, 1979)
- Kukkia (Daagnim 04, 1981)
- Stars / Air / Stripes (Daagnim 05, 1982)
- Witness (Daagnim 08, 1983)
- Anthem Suite (Daagnim 11, 1984)
- Little Toot (Daagnim 13, 1985)
- Stefan (Silkheart, 1986) with John Purcell
- Namesake (Silkheart, 1987) with Charles Brackeen, Malachi Favors
- Dallas-London Sextet: Catechism (Daagnim CD01, 1987)
- Debenge, Dbenge (Silkheart, 1988)
- The Desert Wind (Silkheart, 1989) with Charles Brackeen
- Hymn for a Perfect Heart of a Pearl (Konnex, 1990)
- The Earth and the Heart (Konnex, 1989) with Nels Cline, Alex Cline, Andrew Cyrille
- Welcome to Us (GOWI Records, 1994) with Band of Nordic Wizards
- Forever the Falling of Stars (Daagnim, 1995)
- Home (Daagnim CD06, 2001)
- Old Time Revival (Entropy, 2002)
- NY Midnight Suite (Clean Feed, 2004)
- Nile River Suite (Daagnim CD09, 2004)
- Idle Wild (Clean Feed, 2005)
- No Photograph Available (Clean Feed, 2006)
- Dance of The Soothsayer’s Tongue (Clean Feed, 2007)
- The Gift of Discernment (Not Two, 2008)
- Renegade Spirits (Furthermore, 2008)
- Hymn for Tomasz Stanko (2009) Faruq Z. Bey w/ Northwoods Improvisers Septet
- A Matter of Blood (Furthermore, 2009)
- Songs of Early Autumn (NoBusiness, 2009)
- The Great Bydgoszcz Concert (Ayler, 2009)
- ScapeGrace (Clean Feed, 2009)
- Cape of Storms (Ayler, 2010)
- The Hymn Project (Daagnim, 2011) with Ingebrigt Håker Flaten
- So Soft Yet (Clean Feed, 2011)
- Resurrection and Life (Ayler, 2011)
- Colorado at Clinton (Ayler, 2013)
- In Quiet Waters (ForTune, 2014)

With Charles Brackeen

- Bannar (Silkheart, 1987)
- Attainment (Silkheart, 1987)
- Worshippers Come Nigh (Silkheart, 1987)

With Alvin Fielder

- A Measure of Vision (Clean Feed, 2007)

With Tina Marsh and the Creative Opportunity Orchestra

- The Heaven Line (CreOp Muse 002, 1994)
