= Song of Time: Live at the Vision Festival =

Live album by NAM (Ahmed Abdullah, Alex Harding, Masa Kamaguchi, Jimmy Weinstein)
- Released: 2004
- Recorded: May 28, 2001
- Studio: Vision Festival, New York City
- Genre: Free jazz
- Length: 45:25
- Label: Clean Feed; CF018CD

Ahmed Abdullah chronology
Actual Proof (1999)	Song of Time: Live at the Vision Festival (2004)	Traveling the Spaceways (2004)

Song of Time: Live at the Vision Festival is a live album by the cooperative jazz quartet known as NAM, featuring trumpeter Ahmed Abdullah, saxophonist Alex Harding, bassist Masa Kamaguchi, and drummer Jimmy Weinstein. It was recorded on May 28, 2001, at the Vision Festival in New York City, and was released in 2004 by Clean Feed Records. NAM had previously appeared on the 1999 album Actual Proof.

== Reception ==
Critic Kevin Whitehead included the album on his list of the top 25 all time live performances.

In a review for All About Jazz, Elliott Simon called the album "inspired" and "a faithful record of a memorable musical event," and stated that it "perfectly captures the intimate excitement that can happen at Vision when expert musicians from diverse backgrounds cooperatively gel into a creative whole." AAJ's Rex Butters commented: "NAM adeptly moves through genre walls like a penetrating vapor. Straight-ahead, funk, or holy noise, NAM acquits itself in whatever style it plays... NAM fills a jazz lover's cup with pungent flavors from across the spectrum.

== Track listing ==
1. "Chippie" (Ornette Coleman) – 9:42
2. "Song of Time" (Ahmed Abdullah) – 5:40
3. "Ad Hoc Ism" (Jimmy Weinstein) – 12:40
4. "The Reverend Frank Wright" – 2:13
5. "Serenade for Marion Brown" (Gunter Hampel) – 6:45
6. "Canto 2 Canto II" (Traditional, arranged by Ahmed Abdullah) – 8:28

== Personnel ==
- Ahmed Abdullah – trumpet, voice
- Alex Harding – baritone saxophone
- Masa Kamaguchi – bass
- Jimmy Weinstein – drums
