= Urbaniak =

Urbaniak is a Polish surname. Notable people with the surname include:

- Dorota Urbaniak (born 1972), Polish Canadian rower
- Hilde Urbaniak, German canoer
- James Urbaniak (born 1963), American actor
- James R. Urbaniak (1936–2026), American orthopedic surgeon
- Jarosław Urbaniak (born 1966), Polish politician
- Lena Urbaniak (born 1992), German athlete
- Michał Urbaniak (1943–2025), Polish jazz musician
- Michał Urbaniak (politician) (born 1990), Polish politician and entrepreneur
- Mika Urbaniak (born 1980), Polish singer, daughter of Michał
- Sebastian Urbaniak (born 2001), Polish hurdler
- Urszula Urbaniak (born 1962), Polish director
