= The Namesake (short story) =

1907 short story by Willa Cather

- Short story by Willa Cather

Text available at Wikisource
- Country: United States
- Language: English
- Genre: Short story

Publication
- Published in: McClure's
- Publication type: Magazine
- Publication date: March 1907

"The Namesake" is a short story by Willa Cather. It was first published in McClure's in March 1907.

== Plot summary ==
Charles Bentley, one of Hartwell's students, is about to leave. After going to an upscale restaurant, Maxim's, they all gather at Hartwell, who goes on to tell his life story. His father, an American, moved to Italy to seek inspiration for his sculptures. His uncle stayed in America and died in the Civil War shortly after. At age eleven, his mother died and he was sent to work as an apprentice in a sculpture atelier in Rome until age twenty-one. When he was fourteen his father died. On coming of age, he moved to Paris where he studied with more masters, and eventually took a trip to America to see his father's birthplace in Western Pennsylvania. Although at first he didn't feel at home with the ravages industrialisation had wreaked on the landscape, he soon learned his uncle had been buried in the garden. Later in the attic he found a trunk with his own name on it, and realised this was his uncle's. The sense of kinship was rekindled; that is why he feels going home is always something special.

== Characters ==
- Lyon Hartwell, a sculptor.
- Student from New Hampshire
- Student from Colorado
- Student from Nevada
- Student from the Middle West
- Student from California, the narrator.
- Charles Bentley, a fellow student, leaving Paris for home.
- Two young Poles
- The Gascon
- The waiter at Maxim's
- An old woman from Pennsylvania. She tells him about his uncle's grave.
- An old soldier from Pennsylvania. He tells him about his uncle's eagerness to go to war.
- Lyon Hartwell, Hartwell's uncle. He died in the Civil War at age fifteen.

== Allusions to other works ==
- Hartwell's uncle is said to have read Virgil's Aeneid.

== Literary significance and criticism ==
The Namesake was inspired by her maternal uncle, William Silbert Boak, who died in the Civil War. For that reason, it has been deemed 'one of Cather's most autobiographical fictions'. The short story has been linked to Willa Cather's poem, The Namesake, which also broaches the subject of the Civil War, told from the perspective of a sculptor.

The frame story has been deemed Jamesian. It has also been linked to One of Ours with regard to Claude Wheeler.

It has also been propounded that although it is set in Paris and Pennsylvania, it 'foreshadows the treatment of Nebraska'.
