= Top City =

- 台中大遠百
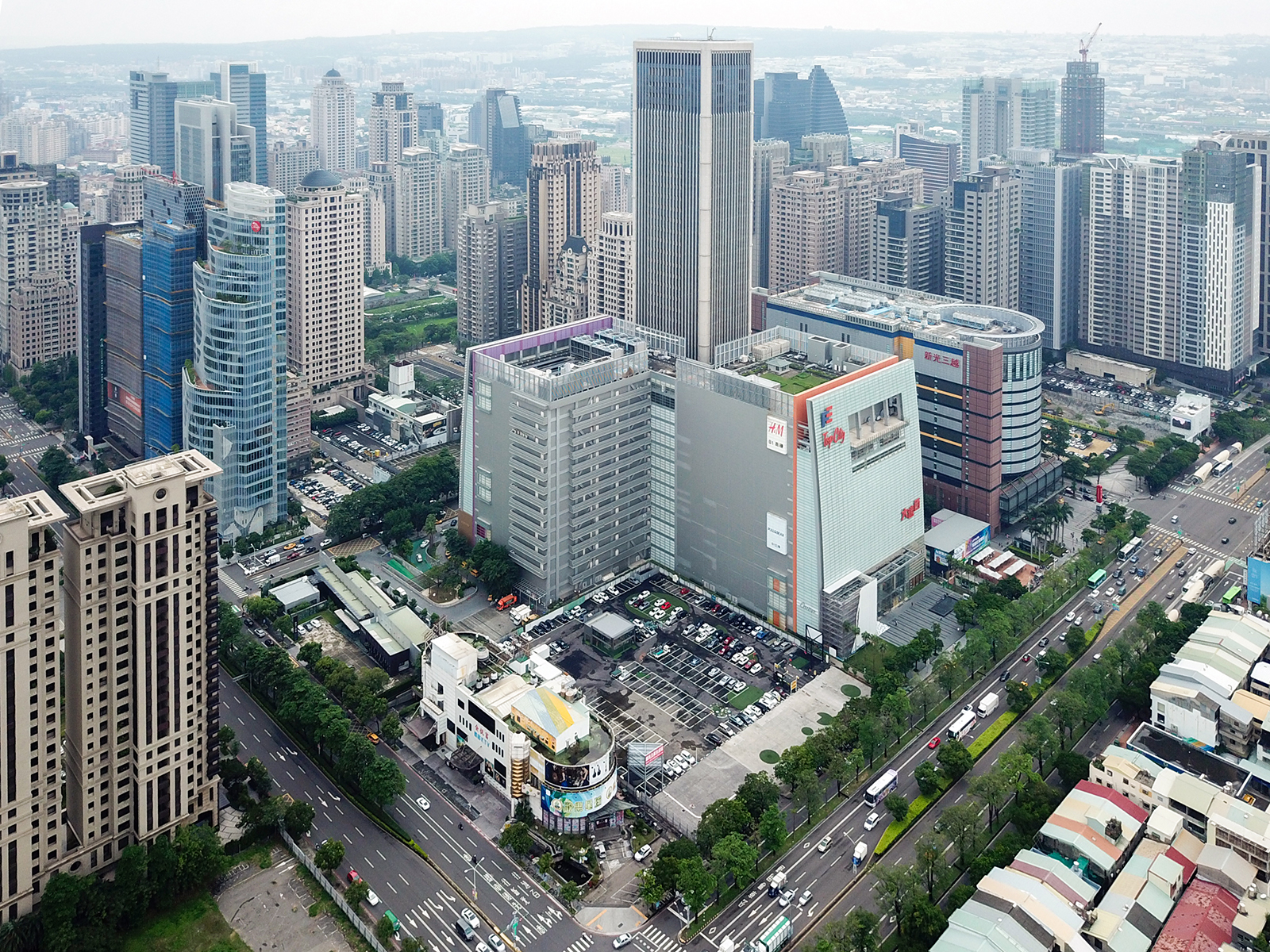
- Location: No. 251, Section 3, Taiwan Boulevard, Xitun District, Taichung, Taiwan
- Coordinates: 24.1646°N 120.6445°E
- Opened: 22 December 2011
- Manager: Far Eastern Group
- Floor area: 178,895 m^{2} (1,925,610 sq ft)
- Floors: 14 floors above ground 2 floors below ground
- Public transit: Taichung City Hall metro station
- Website: https://www.feds.com.tw/en/53/OverSea

Top City (Chinese: 台中大遠百) is a shopping mall located in the 7th Redevelopment Zone of Xitun District, Taichung, Taiwan that opened on 22 December 2011. The mall is owned and operated by the Far Eastern Group. With a total floor area of 178,895 m^{2} (1,925,610 sq ft) and 14 floors above ground and 2 floors below ground, it is the largest shopping center in Taichung when it opened. Main core stores of the mall include Tissot, Hermes, Bvlgari, Gap, Nike and various other high end brands and themed restaurants. In March 2021, the second authorized Lego store in Taiwan opened in the mall.

== Public Transportation ==
The mall is located in close proximity to Taichung City Hall metro station, which is served by the Green line of the Taichung MRT.

== Gallery ==
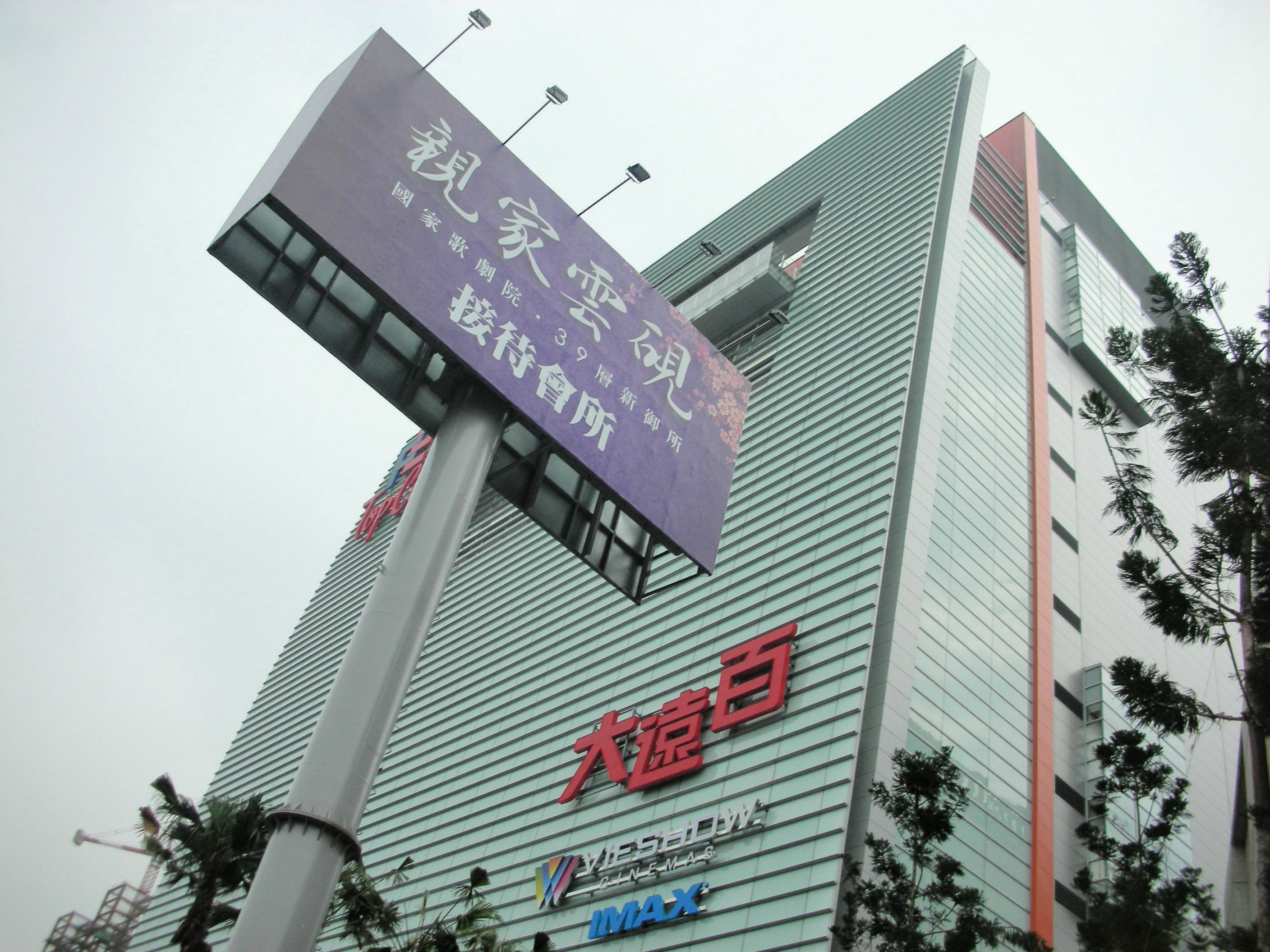
Exterior

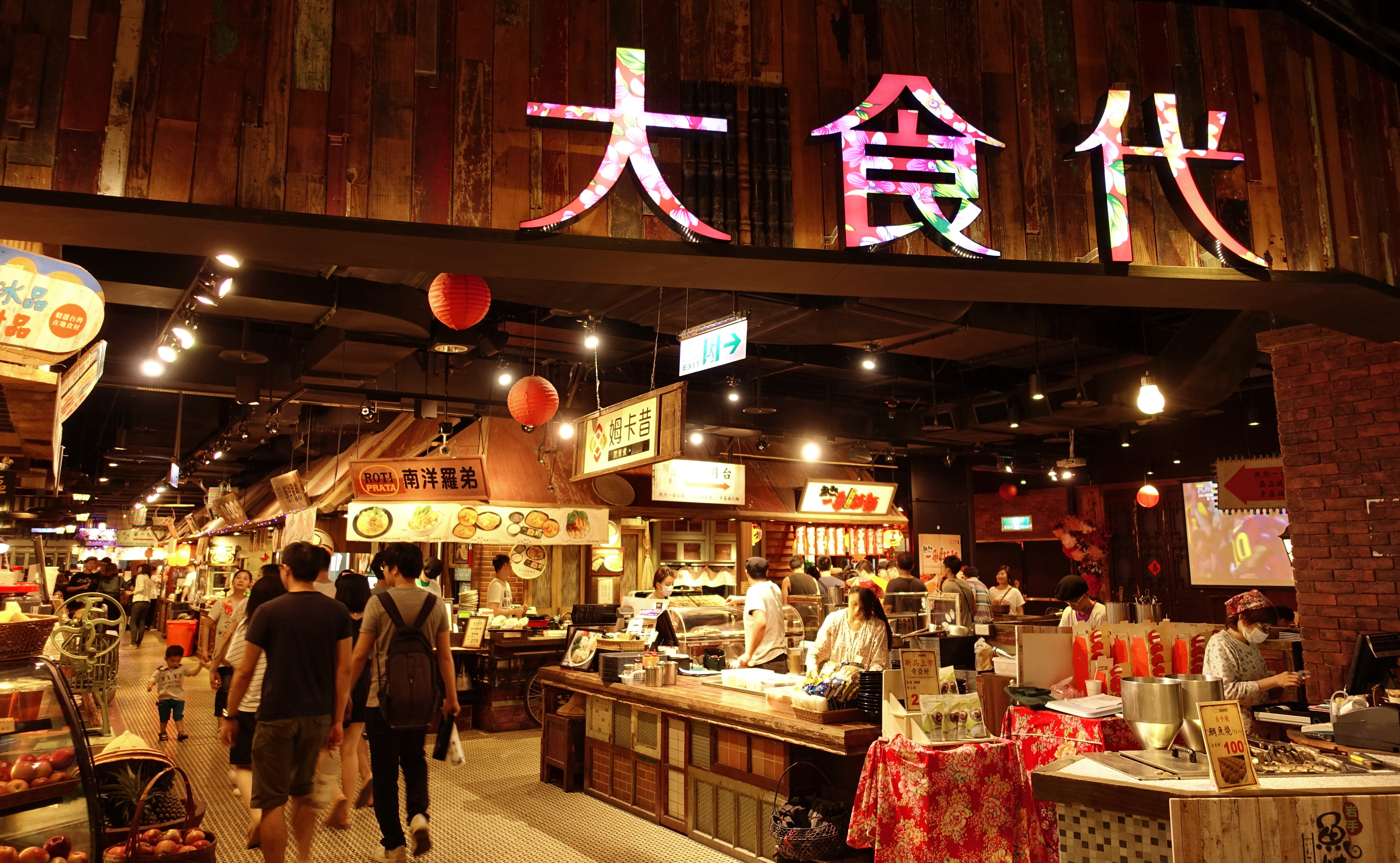
Food Republic

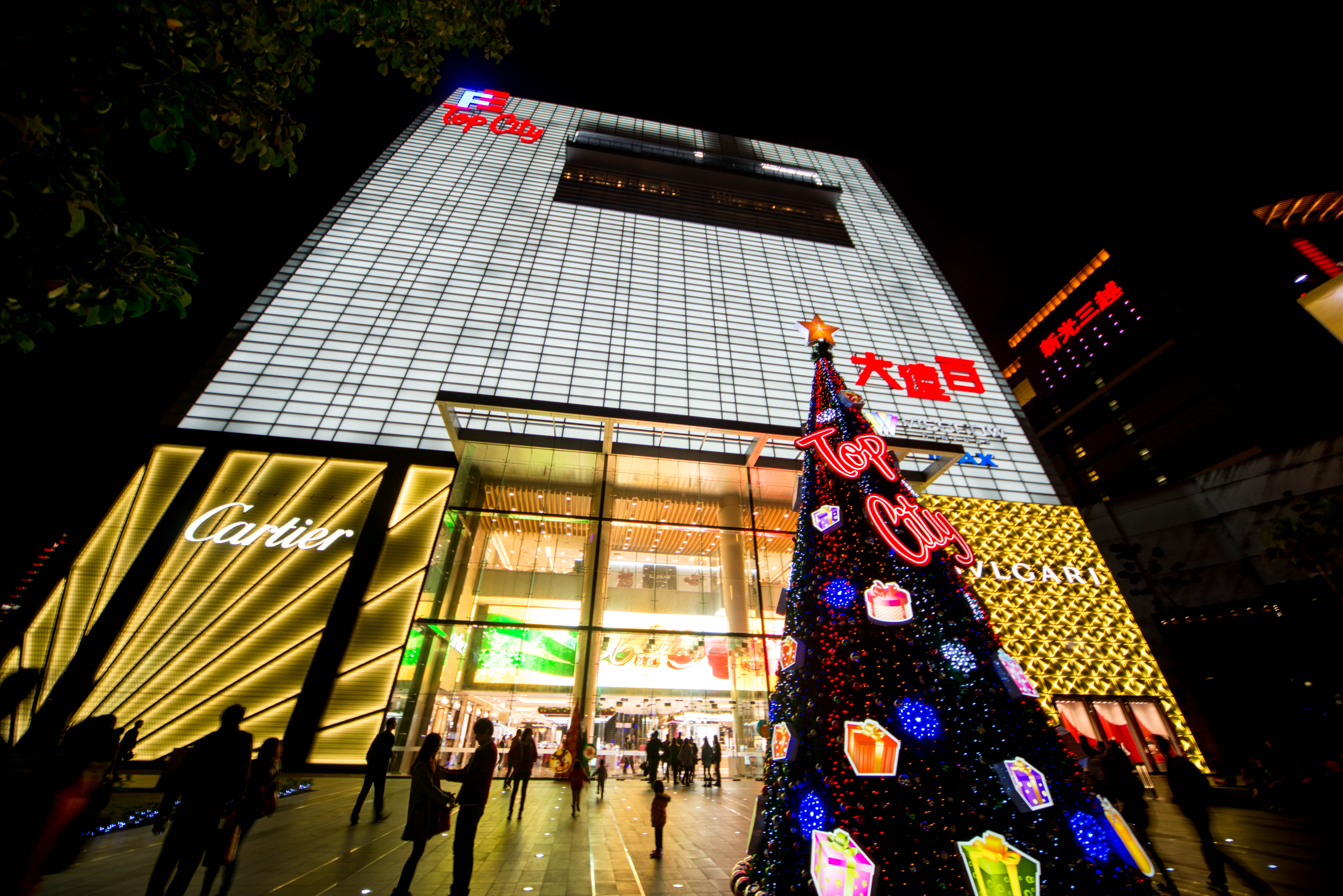
At night

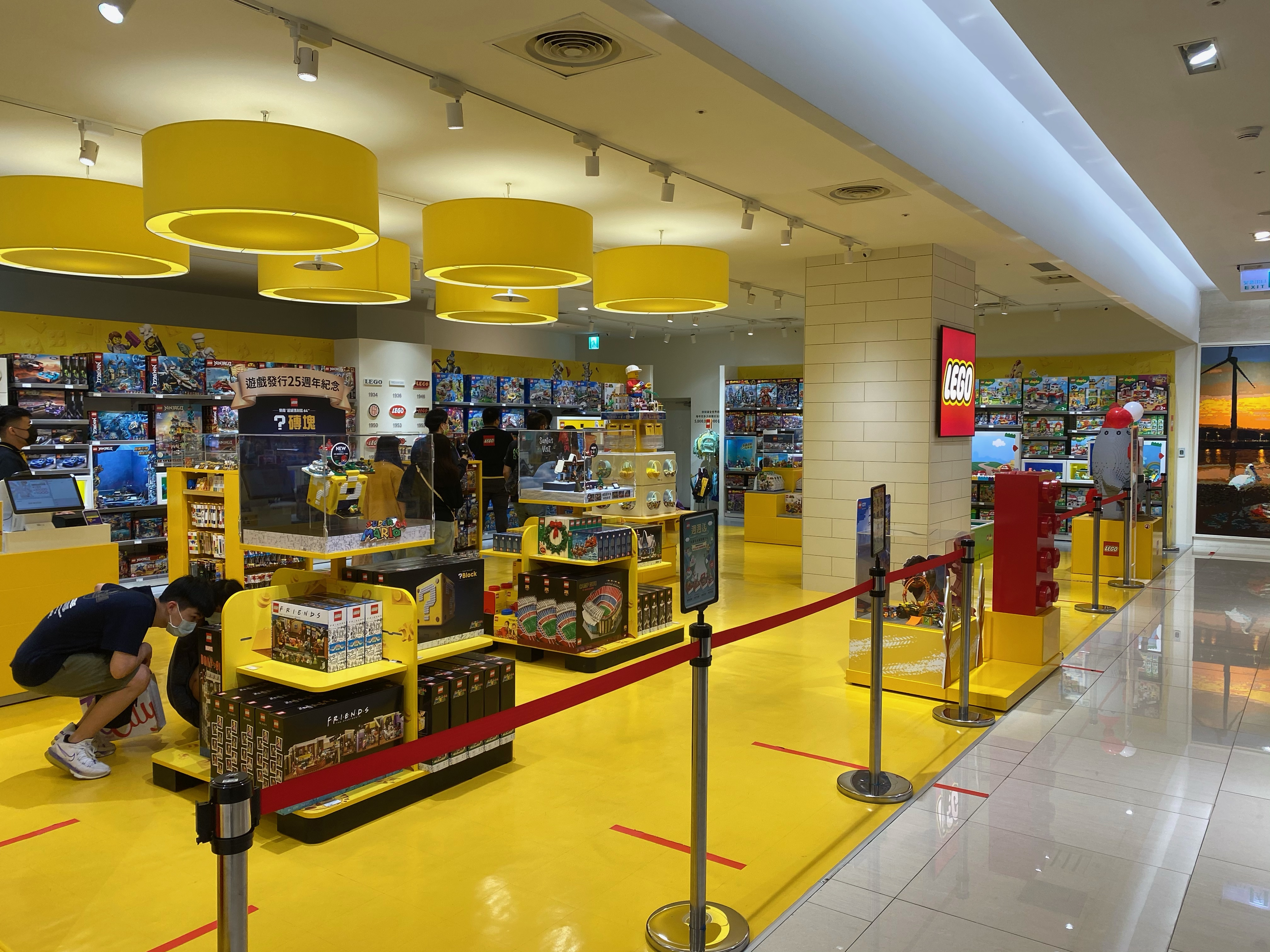
Lego Store

== See also ==
- List of tourist attractions in Taiwan
- Big City (shopping mall)
- Mega City (shopping mall)
