= 50 Percent =

Asian casual clothing brand

- 50 Percent store in Global Mall Taoyuan A19
- Product type: Casual lifestyle clothing
- Current owner: HUI ZI CO., LTD.
- Country: Taiwan
- Introduced: 2010; 16 years ago
- Markets: Taiwan
- Website: www.50-shop.com

50 PERCENT is a Taiwan-owned casual lifestyle clothing company that makes mass-market casual clothing and other items, selling the bulk of its products in Taiwan. The first store opened in Chiayi City in 2010; there are currently 32 locations across Taiwan.

== History ==
- In 2010, the first store was opened on Ren'ai Road in Chiayi City.
- In December 2022, the brand took over the former McDonald's location on Ai 3rd Road in Keelung, with plans to establish a large-scale flagship store there.
- In May 2023, a store was opened at Breeze Nan Jing.
- In June 2025, the brand's original location—the Chiayi Ren'ai store—ceased operations.

== See also ==
- NET (brand)
- Lativ
