= Live at Montreux (Sun Ra album) =

Live album by Sun Ra
- Released: 1977
- Recorded: July 1976
- Genre: Jazz
- Length: 82:07
- Label: Saturn Records, Inner City Records
- Producer: Sun Ra

Professional ratings
Review scores
Source	Rating
The Penguin Guide to Jazz Recordings	3.5/4 stars
The Rolling Stone Jazz Record Guide	5/5 stars

Live at Montreux is an album by Sun Ra recorded in the summer of 1976 at the Montreux Jazz Festival in Switzerland under the billing Sun Ra and his Intergalactic Cosmo Arkestra. It was originally issued in 1977 on the Saturn label, with hand-drawn covers and reissued in 1978 on the Inner City label, with new artwork and song titles and musicians credited. It was first issued on CD by Universe Records in Italy, with poor sound quality and the track "On Sound Infinity Spheres" faded out early by about six minutes. The later Japanese P-Vine and US Inner City CDs both use earlier source tapes and are complete and unedited. A segment of the same Montreux concert (including material which was not included on the LP) appears on the 'Solo Piano & Montreux And Lugano' DVD on Transparency Records.

== Track listing ==
All compositions by Sun Ra, except where noted

CD 1

1. "For the Sunrise" - 2:03
2. "Of the Other Tomorrow" - 7:41
3. "From Out Where Others Dwell" - 4:31
4. "On Sound Infinity Spheres" - 13:26
5. "The House of Eternal Being" - 9:31
6. "Gods of the Thunder Realm" - 6:54
7. "Lights on a Satellite" - 5:11

CD 2

1. "Take the "A" Train: Piano Intro" - 3:50
2. "Take the "A" Train" - 7:51 (Billy Strayhorn)
3. "Prelude" - 4:29
4. "El Is the Sound of Joy" - 9:21
5. "Encore 1" - 9:29
6. "Encore 2" - 7:29
7. "We Travel the Spaceways" - 4:31

== Credits ==
=== Musicians ===
- Danny Davis: Flute, Sax (Alto)
- Marshall Allen: Flute, Sax (Alto)
- John Gilmore: Sax (Tenor)
- Chris Capers: Trumpet
- Larry Bright: Drums
- Stanley Morgan: Conga
- Pat Patrick: Flute, Sax (Baritone)
- Ahmed Abdullah: Trumpet
- June Tyson: Dancer, Vocals
- James "Ham" Jackson: Bassoon, Egyptian Drum
- Elo Omo: Clarinet (Bass)
- Sun Ra: Moog Synthesizer, Organ, Producer, Piano
- Vincent Chancey: French Horn
- Clifford Jarvis: Drums
- Al Evans: Trumpet
- Tony Bunn: Bass (Electric)
- Hayes Burnett: Double Bass

=== Album art ===
- Ken Haas: Cover Photo
- Bob Blumenthal: Liner Notes
- Elo Omo: Photography
