= Reflectativity =

Live album by Wadada Leo Smith
- Released: 1975
- Recorded: November 22, 1974
- Venue: The Educational Center for the Arts, New Haven
- Genre: Jazz
- Length: 41:11
- Label: Kabell
- Producer: Wadada Leo Smith

Wadada Leo Smith chronology
Creative Music - 1 (1972)	Reflectativity (1975)	Song of Humanity (1977)

Reflectativity is the second album by American jazz trumpeter Wadada Leo Smith and the debut with the ensemble New Dalta Ahkri, which was recorded live at The Educational Center for the Arts, New Haven, and released in 1975 on his own Kabell label.

== Background ==
At this time, Smith was living in New Haven and he formed the band with his students and other young musicians based in the area. For this performance it was a trio with pianist Anthony Davis and bassist Wes Brown. In 2000, Smith released an extended remake with Brown replaced by Malachi Favors on John Zorn's imprint Tzadik. The original album was reissued in 2004 including the second set of the concert as part of the four-CD box Kabell Years: 1971-1979, also on Tzadik.

== Reception ==
Professional ratings
Review scores
Source	Rating
AllMusic	4.5/5 stars
The Encyclopedia of Popular Music	3/5 stars

In his review for AllMusic, Eugene Chadbourne states "Well beyond the structural clichés of normal 'head-solo-head-and out' jazz, this piece is one of the finest combinations of improvisation and composition ever recorded."

== Track listing ==
All compositions by Wadada Leo Smith.

1. "Reflectativity" - 22:24
2. "t wmukl - D" - 18:47

== Personnel ==
- Wadada Leo Smith - trumpet, flugelhorn, Indian flute, atenteben, percussion
- Anthony Davis - piano
- Wes Brown - bass, atenteben
