= Light Upon Light (album) =

Studio album by Wadada Leo Smith
- Released: 1999
- Studio: Capital Recording, Los Angeles, CalArts, Valencia, California
- Genre: Jazz
- Length: 52:17
- Label: Tzadik
- Producer: Wadada Leo Smith

Wadada Leo Smith chronology
Condor, Autumn Wind (1998)	Light Upon Light (1999)	Reflectativity (2000)

Light Upon Light is a studio album by American jazz trumpeter Wadada Leo Smith which was released in 1999 on the Tzadik Records' Composer Series. The album includes a composition for chamber ensemble and gamelan quartet, a solo piece for viola, a bass concerto written for Bert Turetzky and two electronic pieces.

== Reception ==
Professional ratings
Review scores
Source	Rating
AllMusic	3/5 stars
The Penguin Guide to Jazz Recordings	3/4 stars

In her review for AllMusic, Joslyn Layne states "Wadada Leo Smith's second recording for the Tzadik label, Light Upon Light, is more spacious and a little colder than his first, Tao-Njia."

== Track listing ==
All compositions by Wadada Leo Smith.

1. "Moths, Flames and the Giant Sequoia Redwood Trees" - 15:33
2. "Hetep: Serenity: Tranquility 2" - 8:05
3. "Multiamerica" - 10:27
4. "Nur: Luminous, Light Upon Light" - 14:01
5. "A Thousand Cranes: A Memorial for Amir Hamzehi" - 4:11

== Personnel ==
Moths, Flames and the Giant Sequoia Redwood Trees

- Stephen "Lucky" Mosko – conductor
- Dorothy Stone – piccolo flute, alto flute
- Martin Walker – clarinet, bass clarinet
- Arthur Jarvinen – vibraphone, Tibetan temple bells, hi-hat cymbale-sets, axatse, large bass drum
- Vicki Ray – piano
- Robin Lorentz – violin
- Erika Duke-Kirkpatrick – cello
- I. Nyoman Wenten – gender barung
- Joh Parsons – gender panembung
- I. Wayhan Budha – kempul, gong ageng
- Wadada Leo Smith – kenong

Hetep Serenity Tranquility 2

- Karen Elaine Bakunin – viola

Multiamerica

- Wadada Leo Smith – trumpet
- Mark Trayle – electronics
- Harumi Makino Smith – poetry

Nur Luminous, Light Upon Light

- David Rosenboom – conductor
- Bertram Turetzky – double bass
- Dorothy Stone – piccolo, alto flute
- Allen Vogel – oboe
- Bill Powell – clarinet, bass clarinet
- Arthur Jarvinen – marimba
- Vicki Ray – celesta
- Brian Pezzone – harmonium
- Robin Lorentz – violin
- Karen Elaine Bakunin – viola
- Erika Duke-Kirkpatrick – cello

A Thousand Cranes A Memorial for Amir Hamzehi

- Wadada Leo Smith – trumpet
- Mark Trayle – electronics
