= Kabell Years: 1971–1979 =

Compilation album by Wadada Leo Smith
- Released: February 4, 2004
- Recorded: December 18, 1971–1979
- Genre: Jazz
- Length: 297:39
- Label: Tzadik
- Producer: Wadada Leo Smith

Wadada Leo Smith chronology
Organic Resonance (2003)	Kabell Years: 1971–1979 (2004)	Lake Biwa (2004)

Kabell Years: 1971–1979 is a four-CD box set released on Tzadik Records compiling American jazz trumpeter/composer/inmproviser Wadada Leo Smith's earliest albums which were originally released on his own, privately pressed label Kabell along with additional previously unissued material from the same era. The set includes the previously released material from Creative Music - 1, Reflectativity, Song of Humanity and Solo Music: Ahkreanvention.

== Reception ==
Professional ratings
Review scores
Source	Rating
AllMusic	4.5/5 stars
Penguin Guide to Jazz	4/4 stars
Tom Hull	B+

In his review for AllMusic, Thom Jurek notes that "This is a monumentally important addition to the recorded library of avant-garde music and should be considered a necessary part of any enthusiast's shelf". On All About Jazz Rex Butters called it "A fitting tribute to a living master, and a fascinating look at beautiful work created over thirty years ago in near obscurity, much of it available for the first time". Writing for JazzTimes Bill Shoemaker said "His output was nothing less than astounding, as most if not all of the four Kabell LPs he issued during the 1970s would merit at least minor classic status in any responsible survey of the decade, especially now that they have been collected with an additional 90 minutes of previously unissued studio and concert performances". The Penguin Guide to Jazz selected this album as part of its suggested Core Collection.

== Track listing ==
All compositions by Wadada Leo Smith except where noted.

Disc one

1. "Nine (9) Stones on a Mountain" - 5:29 Originally released on Creative Music - 1
2. "Improvisation No. 4" - 7:16 Originally released on Creative Music - 1
3. "Creative Music - 1" - 11:54 Originally released on Creative Music - 1
4. "aFmie - Poem (solo) DancE 3" - 13:12 Originally released on Creative Music - 1
5. "Ogotommêli: Dogon Sage" - 8:14 Originally released on Creative Music - 1
6. "Ep - 1" - 3:01 Originally released on Creative Music - 1
7. "Ngoma: Gravity and Lightwaves" - 8:43
8. "Seeds" - 4:18
9. "Zekr" - 4:10
10. "Until the Fire" - 11:27

Disc two

1. "Reflectivity" - 22:24 Originally released on Reflectativity
2. "t wmukl - D" - 18:46 Originally released on Reflectativity
3. "North American Stomp" - 6:54
4. "Visions" - 17:35
5. "Transcendental Suite" - 10:07

Disc three

1. "Song of Humanity" - 5:16 Originally released on Song of Humanity
2. "Lexicon" (Anthony Davis) - 7:44 Originally released on Song of Humanity
3. "Peacocks, Gazelles, Dogwood Trees & Six Silver Coins" - 8:34 Originally released on Song of Humanity
4. "Of Blues and Dreams" (Davis) - 11:08 Originally released on Song of Humanity
5. "Pneuma" - 1:37 Originally released on Song of Humanity
6. "Tempio" - 7:06 Originally released on Song of Humanity
7. "Play Ebony Play Ivory" - 27:12

Disc four

1. "Life Sequence 1" - 12:35 Originally released on Solo Music: Ahkreanvention
2. "Love is a Rare Beauty" - 18:27 Originally released on Solo Music: Ahkreanvention
3. "Aura" - 2:59 Originally released on Solo Music: Ahkreanvention
4. "Ankrasmation" - 20:08
5. "Atoke" - 3:24
6. "Fana" - 7:10
7. "The Zebra Goes Wild" - 10:43

Notes

- Recorded on December 18 & 19, 1971 (Disc One: tracks 1–6), at the Educational Center for the Arts in New Haven, CT on November 22, 1974 (Disc Two: tracks 1–5), at The Gallery in New Haven, CT on August 4, 1976 (Disc Three: tracks 1–6), at WKCR-FM in NYC on February 16, 1975 (Disc Three: track 7), at Mapenzi in Oakland, CA in 1976 (Disc One: tracks 7–10 & Disc Four: tracks 5–7) and at The Gallery in New Haven, CT in 1979 (Disc Four: tracks 1–4)

== Personnel ==
- Wadada Leo Smith - trumpet, flugelhorn, seal horn, recorder, atenteben, Indian wooden flute, harmonica, autoharp, hand zithers, bells, parade drum, hand drum, tin drum, aluminum pot drums, cymbals, mobile sounds-gong, metal-plates, steel-o-phone, gongs, Indian bell
- Oliver Lake - flute, soprano sax, alto sax, marimba, percussion (Disc Three: tracks 1–7)
- Anthony Davis - piano, electric piano, organ (Disc Two: tracks 1–5, Disc Three: tracks 1–7)
- Wes Brown - bass, atenteben, odurogyabe (Disc Two: tracks 1–5, Disc Three: tracks 1–7)
- Pheeroan AkLaff - drums, percussion (Disc Three: tracks 1–7)
