= Kulture Jazz =

Studio album by Wadada Leo Smith
- Released: 1993
- Recorded: October 1992
- Studio: Hardstudios; Winterthur, Switzerland
- Genre: Jazz
- Length: 52:16
- Label: ECM; ECM 1507
- Producer: Steve Lake

Leo Smith chronology
Rastafari (1983)	Kulture Jazz (1993)	Tao-Njia (1996)

Kulture Jazz is a solo album by American jazz trumpeter and composer Wadada Leo Smith, recorded in October 1992 and released on ECM the following year—Smith's second album for the label, following Divine Love (1979).

== Reception ==
Professional ratings
Review scores
Source	Rating
AllMusic	4.5/5 stars
The Encyclopedia of Popular Music	3/5 stars
The Penguin Guide to Jazz Recordings	3.5/4 stars

The AllMusic review by Eugene Chadbourne states, "The ECM folks do much better by Wadada Leo Smith than ever before with this solo recording, a true masterwork of its kind and one of the purest, most enlightening demonstrations of the connected natures of folk, blues, jazz, and creative music."

A reviewer of Jazz Desk stated: "This album is something like the musical equivalent of someone building his own house or boat or sewing his own clothes. It is Wadada Leo Smith alone in the studio playing trumpet, harmonica, bamboo flute, percussions, Asian and African instruments and singing. The music is very personal and at times almost has a meditative quality."

== Track listing ==
All tracks are written by Wadada Leo Smith.

No.	Title	Length
1.	"Don't You Remember?"	3:42
2.	"Kulture of Jazz"	5:33
3.	"Song of Humanity (Kanto Pri Homaro)"	3:36
4.	"Fire-Sticks, Chrysanthemums and Moonlight (For Harumi)"	3:42
5.	"Seven Rings of Light in the Hola Trinity"	2:26
6.	"Louis Armstrong Counterpointing"	2:43
7.	"Albert Ayler in a Spiritual Light"	4:44
8.	"The Kemet Omega Reigns (For Billie Holiday)"	5:02
9.	"Love Supreme (For John Coltrane)"	3:56
10.	"Mississippi Delta Sunrise (For Bobbie)"	3:55
11.	"Mother: Sarah Brown-Smith-Wallace (1920–92)"	4:06
12.	"The Healer's Voyage on the Sacred River (For Ayl Kwel Armah)"	3:46
13.	"Uprising (For Jessie and Yvonne)"	5:05
Total length:		52:16

== Personnel ==
- Wadada Leo Smith – trumpet, flugelhorn, koto, mbira, harmonica, bamboo notch flute, percussion, vocals
