= Divine Love =

Divine Love normally refers to Agape

Divine Love may also refer to:

- Divine Love (album), by Leo Smith
- Divine Love (film), 2019 Brazilian film
