= Go in Numbers =

Live album by Wadada Leo Smith
- Released: 1982
- Recorded: January 19, 1980
- Venue: The Kitchen, New York City
- Genre: Jazz
- Length: 43:57
- Label: Black Saint
- Producer: Wadada Leo Smith

Wadada Leo Smith chronology
Touch the Earth (1980)	Go in Numbers (1982)	If You Want the Kernels You Have to Break the Shells (1983)

Go in Numbers is an album by American jazz trumpeter Wadada Leo Smith which was recorded live in 1980 and released on the Italian Black Saint label. He leads the New Dalta Akhri, a quartet with Dwight Andrews, Bobby Naughton and Wes Brown.

== Reception ==
Professional ratings
Review scores
Source	Rating
The Encyclopedia of Popular Music	3/5 stars
The Penguin Guide to Jazz	3.5/4 stars
The Rolling Stone Jazz Record Guide	4/5 stars

The Penguin Guide to Jazz notes about the title track that "'Smith's opening figures seem to contain half-remembered elements of Ives' The Unanswered Question. Elsewhere he sounds uncannily like a slowed-up version of Don Cherry, an influence that was to seem ever more pressing in years to come."

== Track listing ==
All compositions by Wadada Leo Smith

1. "The World Soul" - 3:50
2. "Go in Numbers" - 16:59
3. "Illumination: The Nguzo Saba" - 16:09
4. "Changes" - 6:59

== Personnel ==
- Wadada Leo Smith - trumpet, flugelhorn, atenteben flute
- Dwight Andrews - tenor sax, soprano sax, flute
- Bobby Naughton - vibraphone
- Wes Brown - bass, odurogyaba flute
