= Reflectativity (2000 album) =

Studio album by Wadada Leo Smith
- Released: 2000
- Recorded: January 2000
- Studio: Avatar, New York City
- Genre: Jazz
- Length: 50:57
- Label: Tzadik
- Producer: Wadada Leo Smith

Wadada Leo Smith chronology
Light Upon Light (1999)	Reflectativity (2000)	Golden Quartet (2000)

Reflectativity is a studio album by jazz trumpeter Wadada Leo Smith which was recorded in 2000 and released by Tzadik Records. The album is an extended remake of a recording Smith released on his own label in 1975. This new version features a trio with pianist Anthony Davis (who performed on the original record) and bassist Malachi Favors.

== Reception ==
Professional ratings
Review scores
Source	Rating
AllMusic	4.5/5 stars
The Penguin Guide to Jazz	3.5/4 stars

In his review for AllMusic, Thom Jurek states "'Smith's Reflectativity is easily his most adventurous and consistent album since 1979's Divine Love."

The Penguin Guide to Jazz notes "The dominant influences on this extraordinary record are Thelonious Monk, Charlie Parker and Anthony Braxton, with whom Smith has worked many times and with whom he shares something of an aesthetic. The playing is very powerful and very compelling."

== Track listing ==
All compositions by Wadada Leo Smith

1. "Reflectativity" - 18:24
2. "Blue Flag" - 4:41
3. "Fisherman T WMUKL-D" - 15:47
4. "Hanabishi" - 12:05

== Personnel ==
- Wadada Leo Smith - trumpet, flugelhorn
- Anthony Davis - piano
- Malachi Favors - bass
