= Celestial Weather =

Studio album by Wadada Leo Smith
- Released: November 13, 2015
- Recorded: June 16, 2012
- Studio: Sear Sound, New York City
- Genre: Jazz
- Length: 62:21
- Label: TUM
- Producer: Petri Haussila

Wadada Leo Smith chronology
June 6th 2013 (2015)	Celestial Weather (2015)	A Cosmic Rhythm with Each Stroke (2016)

Celestial Weather is an album by American jazz trumpeter Wadada Leo Smith and bassist John Lindberg, which was recorded in 2012 and released on November 13, 2015 through the Finnish TUM label. Although they have played together as a duo over the years, this album is their first duo recording.

== Reception ==
Professional ratings
Review scores
Source	Rating
The Absolute Sound	4.5/5 stars
All About Jazz	3.5/5 stars
Down Beat	4/5 stars
Tom Hull	B+
PopMatters	8/10

In a review for Down Beat, Jim Macnie says about the duo "You can hear their unity in the heady banter of these three discrete suites. Each is a cascade of curt phrases that manage to solidify as they align with those of their mate."

The All About Jazz review by Dan McLenaghan notes, "With Celestial Weather, Smith and Lindberg employ a spare, conversational approach.. It is music that is reflective and serene."

The JazzTimes review by Bill Beuttler states, "The result, though less extravagant than Smith’s Pulitzer-nominated, four-CD Ten Freedom Summers and subsequent two-CD The Great Lakes Suites, is a worthy addition to those recent landmarks that documents the two men’s exceptional rapport."

The Point of Departure review by Chris Robinson says, "Celestial Weather is one long series of in-depth conversations, where each man carefully listens to his friend and responds in kind with care and generosity. It can be a difficult listen, as it is extremely nuanced, contains a great deal of information, and requires as much attention as any music can. While some may bristle at its difficulty and the continual abstraction, it rewards and edifies as all great art does."

== Track listing ==
Malachi Favors Maghostut - A Monarch of Creative Music (Wadada Leo Smith)

1. "Part I" - 7:15
2. "Part II" - 9:49

Celestial Weather Suite (Wadada Leo Smith and John Lindberg)

3. "Cyclone" - 5:27
4. "Hurricane" - 7:20
5. "Icy Fog" - 8:19
6. "Typhoon" - 3:31
7. "Tornado" - 9:20

Feathers and Earth (John Lindberg)

8. "Part I" - 7:15
9. "Part II" - 4:05

== Personnel ==
- Wadada Leo Smith - trumpet
- John Lindberg - double bass
