= Song of Humanity =

Live album by Wadada Leo Smith
- Released: 1977
- Recorded: August 4, 1976
- Venue: The Gallery, New Haven
- Genre: Jazz
- Length: 40:59
- Label: Kabell
- Producer: Wadada Leo Smith, Wes Brown, Anthony Davis

Wadada Leo Smith chronology
Reflectativity (1975)	Song of Humanity (1977)	The Mass on the World (1978)

Song of Humanity is an album by American jazz trumpeter Wadada Leo Smith with the ensemble New Dalta Akhri. It was recorded live at The Gallery, New Haven, and released in 1977 on his own Kabell label. The album was reissued in 2004 as part of the four-CD box Kabell Years: 1971–1979 on John Zorn's imprint Tzadik.

== Reception ==
Professional ratings
Review scores
Source	Rating
AllMusic	3/5 stars
The Encyclopedia of Popular Music	3/5 stars

In his review for AllMusic, Eugene Chadbourne states: "This, the one existing album of this group, suffers from a syndrome of the time being too short to allow stretching out if it is to include a few different styles of compositions by each writing member of the group, which, in this case, included not only Smith but pianist Anthony Davis."

== Track listing ==
All compositions by Wadada Leo Smith except where noted.

1. "Song of Humanity" - 5:13
2. "Lexicon" (Anthony Davis) - 7:40
3. "Peacocks, Gazelles, Dogwood Trees & Six Silver Coins" - 8:30
4. "Of Blues and Dreams" (Anthony Davis) - 11:03
5. "Pneuma" - 1:34
6. "Tempio" - 6:59

== Personnel ==
- Wadada Leo Smith – trumpet, flugelhorn, sealhorn, atenteben, steel-o-phone, percussion
- Oliver Lake – flute, soprano sax, alto sax, marimba, percussion
- Anthony Davis – piano, electric piano, organ
- Wes Brown – bass, atenteben, odurogyabe
- Pheeroan akLaff – drums, percussion
