= America's National Parks (album) =

Studio album by Wadada Leo Smith
- Released: October 14, 2016
- Recorded: May 5, 2016
- Studio: Firehouse 12, New Haven
- Genre: Jazz
- Length: 1:36:33
- Label: Cuneiform

Wadada Leo Smith chronology
A Cosmic Rhythm with Each Stroke (2015)	America's National Parks (2016)	Najwa (2017)

Professional ratings
Aggregate scores
Source	Rating
Metacritic	83/100
Review scores
Source	Rating
All About Jazz	4.5/5 stars
AllMusic	4/5 stars
The Buffalo News	2.5/4 stars
Exclaim!	7/10
Financial Times	4/5 stars
The Irish Times	4/5 stars
Jazz Forum	5/5 stars
Pitchfork	7.9/10
Tom Hull	B+

America's National Parks is a two-disc studio album by American jazz trumpeter Wadada Leo Smith.

== Background ==
Smith was given a copy of the Ken Burns documentary The National Parks: America's Best Idea and wanted to go beyond the concepts in it: "I wanted to expand the idea of national parks, and also not make them into cathedrals, sacred ground for some kind of religious endeavor, as Burns did". He wanted to challenge the conventional notion of national parks as only areas of nature: "I say that New Orleans is a national culture park because in America the first community that developed culturally was New Orleans, [...] So why not think of that whole city as a common cultural beacon that happened spontaneously, with all the contradictions of human rights that were taking place there?"

== Release ==
America's National Parks was released by Cuneiform Records on October 14, 2016.

== Reception ==
At Metacritic, that assigns a normalized rating out of 100 to reviews from mainstream critics, the album received an average score of 83, based on seven reviews, which indicates "universal acclaim".

Euan Andrews of The Quietus stated "America's National Parks takes inspiration from past and present and transmutes them into possible futures. It is both act of redemption and sound of vindication through sheer force of will and undeniable existence, a reclamation of civic space as embodiment of cultural signification away from damaging and ineptly proclaimed political discourse or ethos. It is the sound of America as it should and could be and a defining moment for modern American jazz."

A reviewer of DownBeat wrote "America’s National Parks continues in the conceptual and political vein of Ten Freedom Summers, reaffirming Smith’s dedication to commemorating significant moments and ideas in American history... the album takes a broad conceptual gaze at its subject matter. Movements in the suite celebrate individual national parks—including Yellowstone, Yosemite and Sequoia/Kings Canyon—as well as noteworthy musical thinkers like musicologist and educator Eileen Jackson Southern, whom Smith calls “a literary national park”."

== Track listing ==
Disc one

1. "New Orleans: The National Culture Park USA 1718" – 20:59
2. "Eileen Jackson Southern, 1920–2002: A Literary National Park" – 9:40
3. "Yellowstone: The First National Park and the Spirit of America - The Mountains, Super-Volcano Caldera and Its Ecosystem 1872" – 12:34

Disc two

1. "The Mississippi River: Dark and Deep Dreams Flow the River - a National Memorial Park c. 5000 BC" – 31:09
2. "Sequoia/Kings Canyon National Parks: The Giant Forest, Great Canyon, Cliffs, Peaks, Waterfalls and Cave Systems 1890" – 6:48
3. "Yosemite: The Glaciers, the Falls, the Wells and the Valley of Goodwill 1890" – 15:23

== Personnel ==
- Wadada Leo Smith – trumpet
- Anthony Davis – piano
- Ashley Walters – cello
- John Lindberg – bass
- Pheeroan akLaff – drums
