= Compassion (Wadada Leo Smith album) =

Studio album by Wadada Leo Smith, Adam Rudolph
- Released: May 16, 2006
- Recorded: June 29, 2002
- Studio: The Electric Lodge, Venice, CA
- Genre: Jazz
- Length: 47:13
- Label: Meta Records, Kabell Records

Wadada Leo Smith, Adam Rudolph chronology
Snakish (2005)	Compassion (2006)	Wisdom in Time (2007)

Compassion is a studio album by jazz trumpeter Wadada Leo Smith and percussionist Adam Rudolph The album was released on May 16, 2006 via Meta and Kabell labels.

== Reception ==
Professional ratings
Review scores
Source	Rating
The Penguin Guide to Jazz Recordings	3/4 stars

By Chris Kelsey of JazzTimes noted "Ages before reductionist improvisation morphed into a contest to see who could say the least within the longest possible span of time and in the most unmusical way possible, trumpeter/flugelhornist Wadada Leo Smith developed a style built on economy and variable timbre—a style that, while novel, nevertheless embraced essential qualities that distinguish music from random futzing. Compassion is not reductionist. Smith's approach is too direct and organically conceived to be defined so narrowly. But this music does demonstrate how one can explore open space and extremes in tonal color without contrivance."

== Track listing ==
No.	Title	Writer(s)	Length
1.	"Aquamarine Night"	Smith, Rudolph	3:30
2.	"Sun Ray Colors and Rainbow Images"	Smith, Rudolph	10:16
3.	"Fragrance of Light"	Smith, Rudolph	3:11
4.	"Love Rhythms, Heart Songs"	Smith, Rudolph	13:06
5.	"Song of Humanity"	Smith	4:30
6.	"Silver Dream Circle"	Smith, Rudolph	7:13
7.	"The Caller and the Called"	Smith, Rudolph	4:49
Total length:			47:13

== Personnel ==
Band

- Wadada Leo Smith – composer, executive producer, flugelhorn, trumpet
- Adam Rudolph – composer, cymbals, dusungoni, executive producer, gong, hand drums, kalimba, percussion, vocals

Production

- Jim Hemingway – mastering
- Jason Lord – engineer, mixing
