= Creative Music - 1 =

Studio album by Wadada Leo Smith
- Released: 1972
- Recorded: December 18–19, 1971
- Genre: Jazz
- Length: 49:06
- Label: Kabell
- Producer: Wadada Leo Smith

Wadada Leo Smith chronology
Creative Music - 1 (1972)	Reflectativity (1975)

Creative Music - 1 is the first recording as a leader by American jazz trumpeter Wadada Leo Smith, which was released in 1972 on his own, privately pressed label Kabell. Subtitled "Six Solo Improvisations", the album featured Smith solo using trumpet, flugelhorn and various drums, gongs, bells, and home made percussion. It was reissued in 2004 as part of the four-CD box Kabell Years: 1971-1979, released by John Zorn's imprint Tzadik Records.

== Reception ==
Professional ratings
Review scores
Source	Rating
AllMusic	4.5/5 stars
The Encyclopedia of Popular Music	4/5 stars

In his review for AllMusic, Eugene Chadbourne notes that "The real plus of musician-run labels is that the listener has the possibility to receive a completely uncompromised, pure version of the artist's work, and, in the case of this album, that is one large treasure indeed."

== Track listing ==
All compositions by Wadada Leo Smith.

1. "Nine (9) Stones on a Mountain" - 5:29
2. "Improvisation No. 4" - 7:16
3. "Creative Music - 1" - 11:54
4. "aFmie - Poem (solo) DancE 3" - 13:12
5. "Ogotommêli: Dogon Sage" - 8:14
6. "Ep - 1" - 3:01

== Personnel ==
- Wadada Leo Smith - trumpet, flugelhorn, seal horn, recorder, Indian wooden flute, harmonica, autoharp, hand zithers, bells, parade drum, hand drum, tin drum, aluminum pot drums, cymbals, mobile sounds-gong, metal-plates, steel-o-phone, gongs, Indian bell
