= Heart's Reflections =

Studio album by Wadada Leo Smith
- Released: May 16, 2011
- Studio: Firehouse 12 Recording Studio, New Haven, CT; Herb Alpert's School of Music, California Institute of the Arts, Valencia, CA
- Genre: Jazz
- Length: 1:54:00
- Label: Cuneiform Records Rune 330/331
- Producer: Michael Gregory Jackson

Wadada Leo Smith chronology
The Blue Mountain's Sun Drummer (2010)	Heart's Reflections (2011)	Dark Lady of the Sonnets (2011)

Professional ratings
Review scores
Source	Rating
Allmusic	4.5/5 stars
All About Jazz	3.5/5 stars
The Telegraph	3/5 stars
The Jazz Mann	4/5 stars
Tom Hull	A−

Heart's Reflections is a two-disc studio album by American jazz trumpeter Wadada Leo Smith. The album was released on May 16, 2011 via Cuneiform Records label.

== Reception ==
Glen Hall of Exclaim! stated "Trumpeter Smith wears his love for Miles Davis on his sleeve. And the vibe of Heart's Reflections echoes Electric-era Miles, with wah-wah, electric trumpet, yowling guitars, rock-solid drumming and jangling electric piano. But where Miles' music exuded sexuality, most of Smith's two-CD set is ostensibly dedicated to Sufi saint Abu al-Hasan al-Shadhili... Even with a heavy-on-electronics, 14-piece group, Smith's music is consistently focused and expressive.

Phil Johnson of The Independent wrote "The astonishing 20-minute opening track might be called "Don Cherry's Electric Sonic Garden", but it's the wheedling tone and furious backbeat of the late Miles Davis that veteran free-jazz trumpeter Smith makes you think of most. Four electric guitarists among an ensemble of 14, with two laptop operatives squiggling away. You can argue that nothing on the double-CD quite equals it, or question the context of mystic spirituality, but Smith has made electric jazz sound dangerous again".

== Track listing ==
Disc 1

All tracks are written by Wadada Leo Smith.

No.	Title	Length
1.	"Don Cherry's Electric Sonic Garden [For Don Cherry]"	20:50
2.	"The Dhikr of Radiant Hearts, Part I"	2:32
3.	"The Dhikr of Radiant Hearts, Part II"	6:27
4.	"The Majestic Way"	9:13
5.	"The Shaykh, as far as Humaythira"	7:29
6.	"Spiritual Wayfarers"	6:11
7.	"Certainty"	5:24
8.	"Ritual Purity and Love, Part I"	3:25
9.	"Ritual Purity and Love, Part II"	2:32

Disc 2

All tracks are written by Wadada Leo Smith.

No.	Title	Length
1.	"Silsila"	5:34
2.	"The Well: From Bitter to Fresh Sweet Water, Part I"	6:13
3.	"The Well: From Bitter to Fresh Sweet Water, Part II"	5:02
4.	"Toni Morrison: The Black Hole (Sagittarius A*), Conscience and Epic Memory (For Toni Morrison)"	10:35
5.	"Leroy Jenkins's Air Steps (For Leroy Jenkins)"	22:29

== Personnel ==
- Wadada Leo Smith – trumpet
- Pheeroan akLaff – drums, soloist
- Casey Anderson – sax (alto)
- Charlie Burgin – laptop, soloist
- Casey Butler – sax (tenor)
- Josh Gerowitz – guitar (electric), soloist
- Michael Gregory Jackson – guitar (electric), mixing, producer, soloist
- John Lindberg – bass (acoustic), soloist
- Brandon Ross – guitar (electric), soloist
- Angelica Sanchez – piano, soloist, Wurlitzer piano
- Lamar Smith – guitar (electric)
- Stephanie Smith – soloist, violin
- Skúli Sverrisson – six-string bass, bass (electric), soloist
- Mark Trayle – laptop, soloist
