= Tom Burr =

American artist (born 1963)

- Born: 1963 (age 61–62); New Haven, Connecticut, U.S.
- Known for: Concept art

Tom Burr (born 1963) is an American conceptual artist. Burr's artwork explores the relationships between, "the built environment, subjectivity, and historical persona". He is based in New York City.

== Life ==
Burr was born in 1963 in New Haven, Connecticut. Burr attended the Educational Center for the Arts high school, a multi-arts program taught in part by Yale University graduate students. It is here that Burr became aware of and developed an interest in Minimal and post-Minimalist artists, including Robert Smithson, Dan Graham, Eva Hesse and Gordon Matta Clark. Burr's senior thesis work reflected these influences, by merging sculptural elements with brief poetic texts. Simultaneously, Burr’s collage based work began at this time.

After graduating from high school, Burr moved to New York City in 1982 to attend figure drawing classes at the Art Students League of New York. Followed by further study, Burr attended the School of Visual Arts (SVA) from 1982 until 1986 and the Whitney Independent Study Program from 1987 to 1988, where he studied with Craig Owens, Benjamin Buchloh, Yvonne Rainer, Barbara Kruger, and Ull Hohn. During this time Burr immersed himself in the theoretical writings and conceptual practices that would expand his own work and thinking. While at the Whitney Program in 1988 Burr met art dealer Colin de Land and began a friendship that would lead to Burr joining de Land's seminal gallery, American Fine Arts, Co. in the early 1990s.

In the late 1990s Burr embarked on a body of work that remains ongoing; derived from the language and forms of both Tony Smith's sculptures, on the one hand, and closed architectural spaces such as bars, cages and boxes. These works, often borrowing Smith's matte black palette, evoke spaces of control and containment, as well as the "safe zones" of underground cultures, such as gay male culture. Alongside these works, Burr developed his now iconic Bulletin Boards, originally created out of the excessive collecting of images and materials that are part of his working methods. Constructed through plays of juxtaposition, the boards are markers of place, often reflecting the situation of their exhibition.

His work was included in the Whitney Biennial 2004 exhibition at the Whitney Museum of American Art. Burr also participated in the 12th Istanbul Biennial in 2011 and at the Cruising Pavilion exhibition in the context of the 16th Venice Architecture Biennale, Venice, 2018.

Burrs work is found in many public art collections including: Hammer Museum, Whitney Museum of American Art, Institute of Contemporary Art, Miami, Walker Art Center, and many others.

== Publications ==
- "Tom Burr. Anthology: Writings 1991 - 2015," edited by Florence Derieux, Reims: FRAC Champagne-Ardenne / Berlin: Sternberg Press, 2015
- "Tom Burr. Extrospective: Works 1994 - 2006," edited by Florence Derieux, Lausanne: Musée cantonal des Beaux-Arts de Lausanne, 2006
- "Tom Burr: Low Slung," edited by Karola Grässlin, Berlin: Sternberg Press, 2012 ISBN 9783929270327
