= Organic Resonance =

Live album by Wadada Leo Smith & Anthony Braxton
- Released: 2003
- Recorded: April 5, 2003
- Venue: Tonic, New York City
- Genre: Jazz
- Length: 53:16
- Label: Pi Recordings
- Producer: Wadada Leo Smith

Wadada Leo Smith chronology
Luminous Axis (2002)	Organic Resonance (2003)	Kabell Years: 1971-1979 (2004)

Anthony Braxton chronology
Solo (NYC) 2002 (2003)	Organic Resonance (2003)	Saturn, Conjunct the Grand Canyon in a Sweet Embrace (2004)

Organic Resonance is a live album by American jazz trumpeter Wadada Leo Smith and reedist Anthony Braxton, which was recorded live at New York's Tonic club in 2003 and released on Pi Recordings. It was their first full duo recording.

== Reception ==
Professional ratings
Review scores
Source	Rating
The Penguin Guide to Jazz	3/4 stars

The Penguin Guide to Jazz states "Widely admired on first release, these are curiously disappointing sets that never seem to find the two players on common ground."

In a double review for JazzTimes Duck Baker notes that "There is enormous variety of feeling and approach not just from track to track but within each performance, though describing these things is challenging."

The BBC review by Peter Marsh says "Organic Resonance is stripped, spare stuff from just a trumpet and saxophone. It's possible to follow the compositional threads and really immerse yourself in the improvised dialogues; sometimes knotty, sometimes tender, sometimes furiously abstract."

== Track listing ==
1. "Tawaf (Cycles 1-7)" (Wadada Leo Smith) - 11:45
2. "Composition No. 314" (Anthony Braxton) - 15:15
3. "Composition No. 315" (Anthony Braxton) - 16:39
4. "A Celestial Bow, Stone Rivers and Silver Stars Overlayed in Red" (Wadada Leo Smith) - 9:37

== Personnel ==
- Wadada Leo Smith - trumpet, flugelhorn
- Anthony Braxton - reeds
