= Dark Lady of the Sonnets =

Studio album by Wadada Leo Smith
- Released: 2011
- Recorded: January 24 & 25, 2007
- Studio: SoundTeam Godzinsky Studio, Kirkkonummi
- Genre: Jazz
- Length: 55:56
- Label: TUM Records
- Producer: Wadada Leo Smith

Wadada Leo Smith chronology
Heart's Reflections (2011)	Dark Lady of the Sonnets (2011)	Ten Freedom Summers (2012)

Dark Lady of the Sonnets is an album by American jazz trumpeter Wadada Leo Smith, which was recorded in Finland and released in 2011 on the Finnish TUM label.

== Background ==
Smith leads the band Mbira, an ensemble dedicated to realizing a spiritual music inspired by the mystical nature of the Mbira music, a tradition of the Shona people of Zimbabwe, but with a creative contextualization in the contemporary music language. Mbira is a trio composed of Smith on trumpet and flugelhorn, Chinese pipa player Min Xiao-Fen, who has collaborated with avant-garde musicians such as Derek Bailey and John Zorn, and drummer Pheeroan akLaff, who has played with Smith since the mid-seventies.

The album includes five thematic suites composed specifically for this trio. "Sarah Bell Wallace" was written as a memorial for Smith's mother. The title track is a tribute to singer Billie Holiday inspired by a prose poem with the same title composed by Amiri Baraka. This poem itself takes its title from the unidentified 'Dark Lady', who is the subject of many of Shakespeare's sonnets.

== Reception ==
Professional ratings
Review scores
Source	Rating
AllMusic	4/5 stars
Tom Hull	B+

In his review for AllMusic, Thom Jurek states "Dark Lady of the Sonnets proves that at 70, Smith has an entire world of sound at his disposal and continues, in a uniquely creative language, to display it seemingly at will." The All About Jazz review by Dave Wayne says "For the musically adventurous, Dark Lady of the Sonnets is a veritable feast of soulful new sounds, poignantly emotional expressions, and interesting textures from three master musicians who really hear each other on a profound level." In another review for All About Jazz Eyal Hareuveni claims "A masterpiece, from beginning to end."

== Track listing ==
All compositions by Wadada Leo Smith

1. "Sarah Bell Wallace" - 11:53
2. "Blues: Cosmic Beauty" - 10:30
3. "Zulu Water Festival" - 6:28
4. "Dark Lady of the Sonnets" - 10:54
5. "Mbira" - 16:11

== Personnel ==
- Wadada Leo Smith - trumpet, flugelhorn
- Min Xiao-Fen - pipa, voice
- Pheeroan akLaff - drums
