= Golden Hearts Remembrance =

Studio album by Wadada Leo Smith
- Released: 1997
- Recorded: January 18, 1997
- Studio: Sage and Sound, Hollywood
- Genre: Jazz
- Length: 69:13
- Label: Chap Chap
- Producer: Wadada Leo Smith

Wadada Leo Smith chronology
Tao-Njia (1996)	Golden Hearts Remembrance (1997)	Prataksis (1997)

Golden Hearts Remembrance is an album by American jazz trumpeter Wadada Leo Smith which was recorded in 1997 and released on the Japanese Chap Chap label. He leads the ensemble N'Da Kulture, a sextet that blends jazz with Eastern music and the poetry of Smith's wife, Harumi Makino Smith.

== Reception ==
Professional ratings
Review scores
Source	Rating
AllMusic	4.5/5 stars

In his review for AllMusic, Thom Jurek states "All of the works here segue into others, shimmering along with spatial reflections and subtle tonal interaction that relies on the execution of sound as sound rather than as a series of notes to be correctly played in a composition."

== Track listing ==
All compositions by Wadada Leo Smith

1. "Emmeya" - 12:08
2. "Lotus Garden" - 12:15
3. "Tawhid" - 9:50
4. "Golden Hearts Remembrance, A Nur Bakhshad" - 12:48
5. "Condor" - 14:42
6. "Mother: Sarah Brown-Smith-Wallace" - 7:28

== Personnel ==
- Wadada Leo Smith - trumpet, flugelhorn, nohkan
- David Philipson - bansuri, tambura
- William Roper - tuba
- Glenn Horiuchi - piano, shamisen
- Sonship Theus - drums, percussion
- Harumi Makino Smith - poetry
