= June 6th 2013 =

Live album by Wadada Leo Smith & Eco D'Alberi
- Released: January 20, 2015
- Recorded: June 6, 2013
- Venue: Conservatorio Guido Cantelli, Novara, Italy
- Genre: Jazz
- Length: 57:27
- Label: Novara Jazz Series njcd 001

Wadada Leo Smith chronology
The Great Lakes Suites (2014)	June 6th 2013 (2015)	Celestial Weather (2015)

June 6th 2013 is a live album by American jazz trumpeter Wadada Leo Smith recorded with one of the foremost Italian avant-jazz group Eco D'Alberi.

== Background ==
The album was recorded on June 6, 2013 in Conservatorio Guido Cantelli during the Novara Jazz Festival and released as the first in the Novara Jazz Series. All track titles are quotes from poems of Henry Dumas. The release was limited to 500 hand-numbered copies.

== Reception ==
A reviewer of Forced Exposure noted "The music, recorded live during the 2013 edition of the festival, resounds with great "live" intensity throughout the entire set. Wadada's spectacular trumpet sound is highly integrated within the group sound texture. Very dense sound-events alternate with more open parts within a narrative musical structure, essentially based on deep hearing and tight collective interplay."

== Track listing ==
All tracks are written by Antonio Borghini, Alberto Braida, Edoardo Marraffa, Fabrizio Spera, Wadada Leo Smith.

No.	Title	Length
1.	"Decision, Says the Source"	9:11
2.	"The Great Oak"	16:27
3.	"Full Moon"	2:53
4.	"Above the Tree Line"	11:55
5.	"Red Earth"	13:39
6.	"The Zebra Goes Wild"	3:18
Total length:		57:27

== Personnel ==
Band

- Wadada Leo Smith – trumpet
- Antonio Borghini – bass
- Edoardo Marraffa – sax (sopranino), sax (tenor)
- Fabrizio Spera – drums, mastering, mixing, translation
- Alberto Braida – mastering, mixing, piano

Production

- Carlo Amico – graphic design
- Gianmaria Aprile – engineer, mastering, mixing
- Marcello Lorrai – liner notes
