= Human Rights (album) =

Studio album by Wadada Leo Smith
- Released: 1986
- Recorded: 1982
- Genre: Jazz
- Label: Kabell, Gramm

Wadada Leo Smith chronology
If You Want the Kernels You Have to Break the Shells (1983)	Human Rights (1986)	Procession of the Great Ancestry (1989)

Professional ratings
Review scores
Source	Rating
The Encyclopedia of Popular Music	3/5 stars
Tom Hull	B+

Human Rights is a studio album by American jazz trumpeter Wadada Leo Smith. The album was released in 1986 via Kabell and Gramm labels.

== Track listing ==
No.	Title	Length
1.	"Ethiopia / Africa"	8:26
2.	"Don't You Remember"	4:52
3.	"Freedom Song"	2:23
4.	"Rastafari#4"	7:00
5.	"Humanismo Justa (Human Rights) / Tutmonda Muziko (World Music)"	29:05

== Personnel ==
- Leo Smith – trumpet, vocals, mbira
- Stanya – electric guitar, synthesizer
- Michele Navazio – acoustic guitar, bass [synthesizer]
- James Emery – electric guitar
- Thurman Barker – drums
- Peter Kowald – bass, tuba, percussion
- Guenter Sommer – drums, percussion
- Tadao Sawai – koto, percussion
