= Spirit Catcher (album) =

Studio album by Wadada Leo Smith
- Released: 1979
- Recorded: May 21, 1979
- Studio: Van Gelder Studio, Englewood Cliffs
- Genre: Jazz
- Length: 38:34 (LP); 49:47 (CD)
- Label: Nessa
- Producer: Chuck Nessa

Wadada Leo Smith chronology
Budding of a Rose (1978)	Spirit Catcher (1979)	Touch the Earth (1980)

Spirit Catcher is a studio album by American jazz trumpeter Wadada Leo Smith, recorded in 1979 and released on Nessa Records.

== Background ==
Smith leads the New Dalta Akhri, a quintet with Dwight Andrews, Bobby Naughton, Wes Brown and Pheeroan akLaff, in two original compositions: "Images" and "Spirit Catcher". In addition, Smith prepared a very unusual piece for muted trumpet and three harps: "The Burning of Stones", a composition dedicated to Anthony Braxton with elements of two traditions involving harp-like instruments, the West African kora and the Japanese koto. The 2009 CD reissue adds an alternate version of this piece.

== Reception ==
Professional ratings
Review scores
Source	Rating
AllMusic	2.5/5 stars
The Encyclopedia of Popular Music	3/5 stars
The Rolling Stone Jazz Record Guide	4/5 stars

In his review for AllMusic, Scott Yanow states: "This is thought-provoking music that grows in interest with each listen." The All About Jazz review by Clifford Allen says: "Recorded crisply by Rudy Van Gelder (unlike the somewhat murky Kabell LPs), Spirit Catcher presents Smith's earlier music with clarity and warmth."

== Track listing ==
All compositions by Wadada Leo Smith

1. "Images" - 19:09
2. "The Burning of Stones" - 9:42
3. "Spirit Catcher" - 9:43

Bonus track on CD

4. "The Burning of Stones" first version - 11:13

== Personnel ==
- Wadada Leo Smith - trumpet, flugelhorn
- Dwight Andrews - clarinet, tenor sax, wooden flute
- Bobby Naughton - vibraharp
- Wes Brown - bass, wooden flute
- Pheeroan AkLaff - drums
- Irene Emanuel - harp
- Carol Emanuel - harp
- Ruth Emanuel - harp
