= Golden Quartet =

Studio album by Wadada Leo Smith
- Released: 2000
- Recorded: January 3, 2000
- Studio: Avatar Studio, New York City
- Genre: Jazz
- Length: 57:03
- Label: Tzadik
- Producer: Wadada Leo Smith

Wadada Leo Smith chronology
Reflectativity (2000)	Golden Quartet (2000)	Red Sulphur Sky (2001)

Golden Quartet is a studio album by American jazz trumpeter Wadada Leo Smith which was recorded in 2000 and released on Tzadik Records. It was the debut recording by the eponymous ensemble featuring pianist Anthony Davis, bassist Malachi Favors and drummer Jack DeJohnette.

== Reception ==
Professional ratings
Review scores
Source	Rating
AllMusic	4.5/5 stars
The Penguin Guide to Jazz	3.5/4 stars

In her review for AllMusic, Joslyn Layne states "Golden Quartet is Wadada Leo Smith's strongest date as a leader in quite some time and certainly is his best among his releases on Tzadik."

The Penguin Guide to Jazz notes "On 'Celestial Sky and All the Magic', Smith demonstrates again how much he owes to Miles Davis, but also how far he has travelled beyond."

== Track listing ==
All compositions by Wadada Leo Smith

1. "DeJohnette" - 15:12
2. "Harumi" - 6:55
3. "Celestial Sky and All the Magic: A Memorial for Lester Bowie" - 15:27
4. "The Healer's Voyage on the Sacred River" - 7:33
5. "America's Third Century Spiritual Awakening" - 11:56

== Personnel ==
- Wadada Leo Smith - trumpet, flugelhorn
- Anthony Davis - piano
- Malachi Favors - bass
- Jack DeJohnette - drums
