= The Blue Mountain's Sun Drummer =

Live album by Wadada Leo Smith
- Released: 2010
- Recorded: October 23, 1986
- Venue: Brandeis University, Massachusetts
- Genre: Jazz
- Length: 51:43
- Label: Kabell

Wadada Leo Smith chronology
| Abbey Road Quartet (2009) | The Blue Mountain's Sun Drummer (2010) | Heart's Reflections (2011) |

The Blue Mountain's Sun Drummer is an album by American jazz trumpeter Wadada Leo Smith with drummer Ed Blackwell, a radio broadcast at WBRS recorded live in 1986 at Brandeis University but not issued until 2010 on Smith's own Kabell label.

== Reception ==
Professional ratings
Review scores
| Source | Rating |
|---|---|
| Down Beat | 4.5/5 stars |
| Tom Hull | A− |

In a review for Down Beat, John Corbett points the BYG LPs that Blackwell recorded with Don Cherry as the main reference and states "Smith is much too strong an individualist to play anyone else's role, and while he has a definite multicultural orientation and clearly loves the raw sonic potential of the trumpet, you've never mistake him for Cherry. On The Blue Mountain's Sun Drummer his radiant core sound, warm and projective, floats over Blackwell's impossibly relaxed drumming."

The All About Jazz review by Clifford Allen notes that "Smith's sense of orchestration has always seemed entirely different from Cherry's, whether in a solo or group context. The phrasing of both sound and silence, ever natural, has always appeared utterly poised, pinched and cutting front-porch paeans to downriver ancestry wrapped into a massive, fluffed whole. But it would be difficult to look at this set of duos without thinking of Mu, even when conscious of the contrast between the pairings."

The JazzTimes review by Mike Shanley states "Wadada Leo Smith and Ed Blackwell play with passion and cohesion that makes any additional instruments unnecessary" and notes that "Smith and Blackwell were not regular collaborators, but by the way they sounded on this night, they clearly shared the same mindset."

The Point of Departure review by John Litweiler says "There are strong flavors of African drum patterns in Blackwell's irresistibly swinging rhythms, plus in the many passages when trumpet and drums momentums coincide, Blackwell's interplay kicks hard. His drum kit has dark resonances because he prefers skin-and-wood sounds over metal sounds, and the complexity and energy of his lines adds to the emotional darkness."

== Track listing ==
All compositions by Wadada Leo Smith

1. "Uprising" - 4:41
2. "Love" - 5:10
3. "Seeds of a Forgotten Flower" - 2:22
4. "The Blue Mountain's Sun Drummer" - 6:35
5. "Mto: The Celestial River" - 6:45
6. "Don't You Remember" - 5:54
7. "Sellasie-I" - 3:42
8. "Seven Arrows in the Garden of Light" - 3:56
9. "Buffalo People: A Blues Ritual Dance" - 8:49
10. "Albert Ayler in a Spiritual Light" - 3:38

== Personnel ==
- Wadada Leo Smith - trumpet, flugelhorn, flute, mbira, voice
- Ed Blackwell - drums, percussion
