= If You Want the Kernels You Have to Break the Shells =

Live album by Peter Kowald, Wadada Leo Smith, Günter Sommer
- Released: 1983
- Recorded: Side A: January 29, 1981; Side B: May 5, 1981
- Venue: Side A: Flöz, Berlin; Side B: Drensteinfurt
- Genre: Jazz
- Length: 37:46
- Label: FMP
- Producer: Jost Gebers

Wadada Leo Smith chronology
Go in Numbers (1982)	If You Want the Kernels You Have to Break the Shells (1983)	Human Rights (1986)

If You Want the Kernels You Have to Break the Shells is an album by a free jazz trio consisting of German bassist Peter Kowald, American trumpeter Wadada Leo Smith, and German drummer Günter Sommer, which was recorded live in 1981 and released on the German FMP label. The two tracks from the side A of the album were combined on the CD reissue with Touch the Earth, another album by the same trio.

== Reception ==
Professional ratings
Review scores
Source	Rating
AllMusic	4.5/5 stars
The Penguin Guide to Jazz	3/4 stars

In his review for AllMusic, Thom Jurek states about the Touch the Earth - Break the Shells reissue "This is music of the mind, certainly, but it is also from the body and the earth itself. This is free jazz that sings!."

The JazzTimes review by John Murph says about the reissue "Both wild and peaceful, Touch The Earth-Break the Shells, is an invigorating post-Art Ensemble of Chicago experience."

The authors of the Penguin Guide to Jazz Recordings wrote: "the overriding sense is of ego-less improvisation unburdened by ideology or by musical preconceptions."

== Track listing ==
All compositions by Smith / Kowald / Sommer

1. "Unlost Time" – 7:58
2. "Rastafari in the Universe" – 11:55
3. "Break the Shells [thanks to Eckehart and Evan]" – 17:53

== Personnel ==
- Peter Kowald – double bass
- Wadada Leo Smith – trumpet, flugelhorn, flute, african thumb piano
- Günter Sommer – drums, percussion, bells, organ pipes
