= Rastafari (album) =

Studio album by Wadada Leo Smith
- Released: 1983
- Recorded: June 12, 1983
- Studio: McClear Place Studios, Toronto
- Genre: Jazz
- Length: 39:41
- Label: Sackville
- Producer: Bill Smith

Wadada Leo Smith chronology
| Procession of the Great Ancestry (1989) | Rastafari (1983) | Kulture Jazz (1993) |

Rastafari is a studio album by American jazz trumpeter Wadada Leo Smith with the Bill Smith ensemble, released in 1983 on the Canadian Sackville label. The trumpeter considers the recording a cooperative effort, it is Bill Smith, co-founder of Sackville and producer of the album, who made it a "Leo Smith record". It was reissued on CD in 2003 with new artwork by Boxholder.

== Reception ==
Professional ratings
Review scores
| Source | Rating |
|---|---|
| AllMusic | 4.5/5 stars |
| The Encyclopedia of Popular Music | 3/5 stars |
| The Penguin Guide to Jazz | 3.5/4 stars |
| The Rolling Stone Jazz Record Guide | 4/5 stars |

In his review for AllMusic, Scott Yanow states: "The playing by these adventurous musicians is advanced and quite free on the four group originals, and all five players share equally in the creation of these fresh explorations."

== Track listing ==
1. "Rastafari" (Wadada Leo Smith) - 7:30
2. "Rituals" (Bill Smith) - 11:56
3. "Madder Lake" (David Prentice) - 11:05
4. "Little Bits" (Bill Smith) - 9:10

== Personnel ==
- Wadada Leo Smith - trumpet, flugelhorn, percussion, harmonica
- Bill Smith - soprano sax, sopranino sax, alto clarinet
- David Prentice - violin
- David Lee - bass, cello
- Larry Potter - vibraphone
