= Procession of the Great Ancestry =

Studio album by Wadada Leo Smith
- Released: 1989
- Recorded: February 28, 1983
- Studio: Acme Recording, Chicago
- Genre: Jazz
- Length: 47:15
- Label: Nessa
- Producer: Chuck Nessa

Wadada Leo Smith chronology
Human Rights (1986)	Procession of the Great Ancestry (1989)	Rastafari (1983)

reissue cover

Procession of the Great Ancestry is an album by American jazz trumpeter Wadada Leo Smith which was recorded in 1983, first released in 1989 on the English Chief label licensed by Nessa Records and reissued in 2009 on Nessa.

== Music ==
The album includes four compositions dedicated to trumpeters who have inspired Smith (Miles Davis, Dizzy Gillespie, Booker Little and Roy Eldridge) and performed by a quartet including vibraphonist Bobby Naughton, bassist Joe Fonda and percussionist Kahil El'Zabar. On two vocal tracks the ensemble is joined by bassist Mchaka Uba and blues guitarist Louis Myers. The final track, "Nuru Light: The Prince of Peace", is a tribute to slain civil rights leader Martin Luther King Jr., and the quartet is joined by tenor saxophonist John Powell.

== Reception ==
Professional ratings
Review scores
Source	Rating
AllMusic	4.5/5 stars
The Encyclopedia of Popular Music	3/5 stars
Tom Hull	B+
The Penguin Guide to Jazz	3.5/4 stars

In his review for AllMusic, Thom Jurek writes: "Procession of the Great Ancestry is among Wadada Leo Smith's most obscure, but ultimately most satisfying, recordings. This was the first album to showcase Smith's expansive vision, which included all forms of black music -- from the myriad languages of jazz to gutbucket blues, reggae, and various African folk musics as well as a little R&B groove for measure."

The Penguin Guide to Jazz states: "'Smith makes no attempt to pastiche any of his musical ancestors. A wonderful record, despite the overcooked poetics."

== Track listing ==
All compositions by Wadada Leo Smith

1. "Blues: Jah Jah Is the Perfect Love" - 2:50
2. "Procession of the Great Ancestry" - 15:10
3. "The Flower That Seeds the Earth" - 6:09
4. "The Third World, Grainery of Pure Earth" - 8:25
5. "Who Killed David Walker?" - 3:12
6. "Celestials Sparks in the Sanctuary of Redemption" - 8:01
7. "Nuru Light: The Prince of Peace" - 3:11

== Personnel ==
- Wadada Leo Smith - trumpet, flugelhorn, kalimba, voice
- Bobby Naughton - vibraharp
- Joe Fonda - bass, electric bass on 1 & 5
- Kahil El'Zabar - drums, balafon, kalimba, percussion
- Louis Myers - electric guitar on 1 & 5
- Mchaka Uba - bass on 1 & 5
- John Powell - tenor sax on 7
