= Kim Nalley =

American singer (born 1969)

- Birth name: Kim Rene Nalley
- Born: 1969 (age 55–56)
- Origin: San Francisco, California, United States
- Genres: Jazz, blues, folk, swing
- Occupation(s): Singer-songwriter, club owner, writer, dancer
- Years active: 1987–present
- Labels: Rounder, City Hall, CE Jazz & Blues
- Website: kimnalley.com

Kim Rene Nalley (born 1969) is an American jazz and blues singer with a 3½ octave range.

== Early life ==
Raised Catholic in New Haven, Connecticut, Nalley is from a musical family that includes jazz drummer and photographer Reggie Jackson, she received piano lessons from her great-grandmother. She attended Educational Center for the Arts (ECA) in New Haven.

== Career ==
Nalley switched to jazz shortly after moving to San Francisco Bay Area in the late 1980s, where she attended University of California, Berkeley (UC Berkeley). She received from UC Berkeley a B.A. degree in History and sang in the Cal Big Band. "She studied classical music and theatre and, while attending college, she gained important experience singing in local clubs and jam sessions."

While performing weekly at the Alta Plaza, director Michael Tilson Thomas discovered Nalley, recorded her in concert, and hired her to sing a program of Gershwin tunes with the San Francisco Symphony. She began performing with the Johnny Nocturne Band, charting at No. 12 on the Gavin list and embarking on a national and international touring schedule that included the Mountain Stage. She also performed at the Teatro Zinzanni as Madame Zinzanni.

After spending a couple of years living in Switzerland, she returned to San Francisco to own and run the Jazz at Pearl's North Beach night club during 2003–2008.

== Discography ==
=== As leader ===
- Need My Sugar (CE Jazz & Blues, 2002)
- She Put a Spell on Me: Kim Nalley Sings Nina Simone (CE Jazz & Blues, 2006)
- Ballads for Billie (CE Jazz & Blues, 2006)
- Christmas Time Is Here (2010)
- Blues People (2015)

=== As guest ===
- With Rhoda Scott
- Beyond the Sea (Doodlin')
