= Solo: Reflections and Meditations on Monk =

Studio album by Wadada Leo Smith
- Released: October 20, 2017
- Recorded: November 16–17, 2014 and August 8, 2015
- Studio: Studio M2, Finnish Broadcasting Company (YLE), Helsinki, Finland
- Genre: Jazz
- Length: 56:30
- Label: TUM Records TUM CD 053
- Producer: Petri Haussila

Wadada Leo Smith chronology
Najwa (2017)	Solo: Reflections and Meditations on Monk (2017)	Lebroba (2018)

Professional ratings
Aggregate scores
Source	Rating
Metacritic	74/100
Review scores
Source	Rating
All About Jazz	5/5 stars
Jazz Forum	4/5 stars
Mojo	4/5 stars
PopMatters	5/10
Tom Hull	B+

Solo: Reflections and Meditations on Monk is a studio album by American jazz trumpeter Wadada Leo Smith. The album was recorded in Finland and released on October 20, 2017 via Finnish TUM Records label. The album contains five tracks written by Thelonious Monk, and three by Smith.

== Reception ==
At Metacritic, that assigns a normalized rating out of 100 to reviews from mainstream critics, the album received an average score of 74, based on four reviews, which indicates "generally favorable reviews".

Derek Taylor of Dusted Magazine wrote "Solo: Reflections and Meditations on Monk finds trumpeter/composer Wadada Leo Smith celebrating the life, music and spirit of the individual he feels the greatest kinship to in the cosmology of creative music." Will Layman of PopMatters stated "This is a piece of serious art, and it is an attempt to very deliberately look at the melodies and moods of a master... Reflection and Meditations on Monk is not an indictment of the brilliant Smith, merely confirmation that even a long and brilliant career has its lows."

A reviewer of Dusty Groove commented "Trumpeter Wadada Leo Smith never fails to blow us away – and even though he's captured our ear with recent higher-concept projects or other group work, he sounds equally mindblowing here in a completely solo setting! As you'd guess from the title, the set's based around the musical vision of Thelonious Monk – territory not often explored on solo trumpet, and handled beautifully here by Smith – both on his long extrapolations based on Monk's compositions, and on his own tunes dedicated to Monk – which are these bold, brilliant paintings in sound that the legendary pianist would have been proud to hear".

== Track listing ==
No.	Title	Writer(s)	Length
1.	"Ruby, My Dear"	Thelonious Monk	9:20
2.	"Monk and His Five Point Ring at The Five Spot Café"	Wadada Leo Smith	7:47
3.	"Reflections"	Thelonious Monk	7:59
4.	"Monkishness – A Cinematic Vision of Monk Playing Solo Piano"	Wadada Leo Smith	3:43
5.	"Crepuscule with Nellie"	Thelonious Monk	5:56
6.	"Monk, The Composer in Sepia – A Second Vision"	Thelonious Monk	4:38
7.	"Monk and Bud Powell at Shea Stadium – A Mystery"	Wadada Leo Smith	8:37
8.	"'Round Midnight"	Thelonious Monk	7:37
Total length:			56:30

== Personnel ==
Band

- Wadada Leo Smith – composer, liner notes, trumpet

Production

- William Gottlieb – photography
- Jori Grönroos – photography
- Petri Haussila – photography, producer
- Miikka Huttunen – mixing
- Ole Kandelin – artwork
- Juha Lökström – design
- Nikopetri Paakkunainen – engineer
- Esa Santonen – mastering
