= Lincoln Theatre (New Haven, Connecticut) =

- U.S. National Register of Historic Places
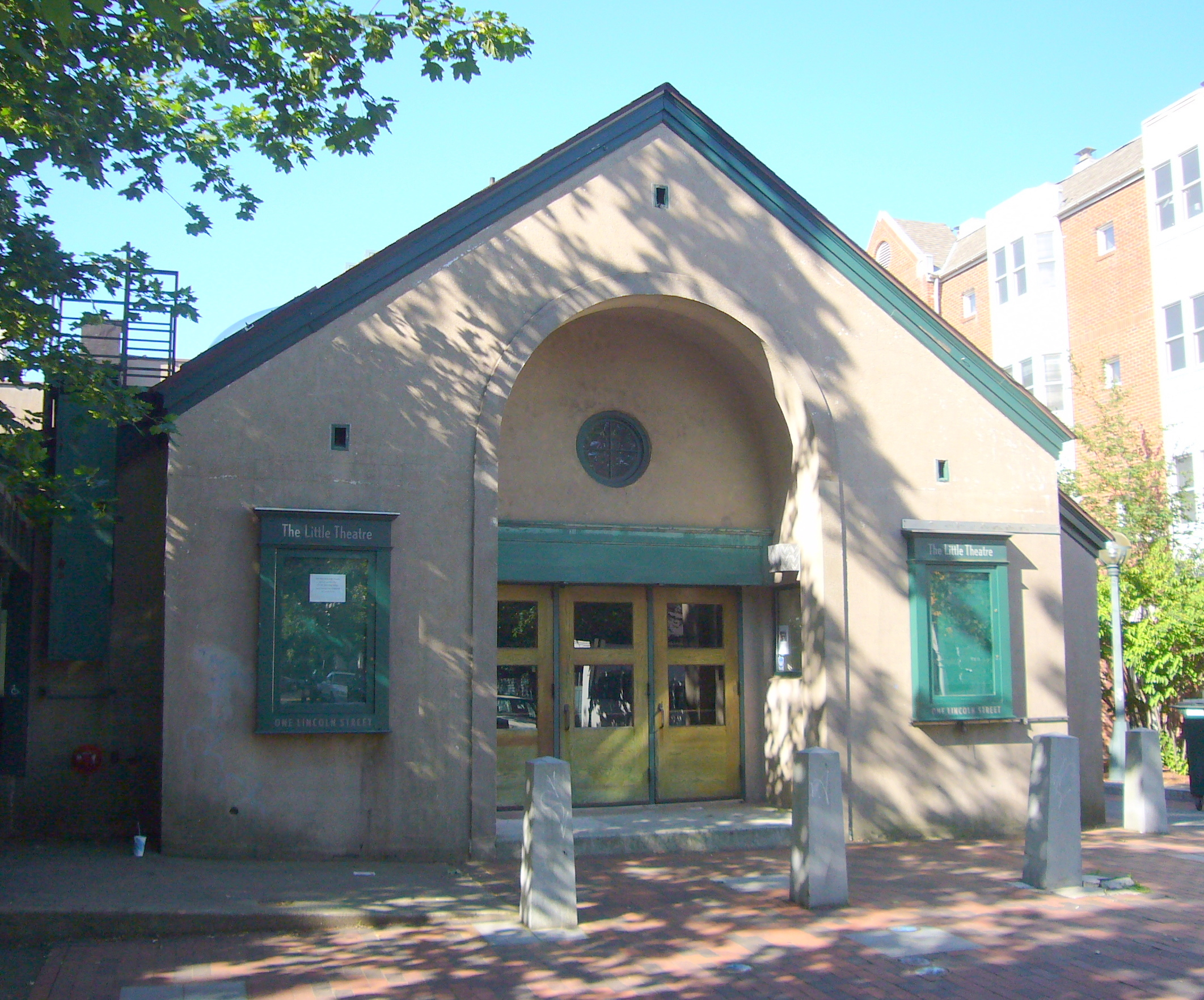

- Location within Connecticut Location within the United States
- Location: 1 Lincoln Street, New Haven, Connecticut
- Coordinates: 41°18′43″N 72°55′12″W
- Area: less than one acre
- Built: 1924
- Architect: Russell, Samuel G.; Gray, George H.
- Architectural style: Modern Movement, Modern Free-Style
- NRHP reference No.: 84001134
- Added to NRHP: March 1, 1984

The Lincoln Theatre, also known as Little Theatre on Lincoln Street, is a historic performance space at 1 Lincoln Street in New Haven, Connecticut. Built in 1924, it is the only known survivor in the state of the Little Theatre Movement of 1911-1933. The building was listed on the National Register of Historic Places in 1984. After a major rehabilitation in the 2010s, the theater was reopened, and is now known as the ACES Little Theatre.

== Description and history ==
The Lincoln Theatre is located on a densely built residential block on Lincoln Street, a short dead end off Trumbull Street, about three blocks north of the New Haven Green. It is a multipart construction, with a gable-roofed entry and auditorium at its north end, with rear sections devoted to the backstage and dressing room areas. A modern glass-and-stone addition extends to the left side of the original building.

The theater was built in 1924, and was the only purpose built theater constructed in the state by one of a dozen or so Little Theatre Movement organizations in the state. It was in active use by that organization until 1935, mainly under the creative auspices of Jack Crawford, an English professor at Yale University. In 1935 it was taken over by the Federal Theater Project, a Works Progress Administration program supporting the creative arts, which ended in 1939. It was used for commercial theatrical productions until 1945, when it was converted into a film theater, showing foreign and art films. Robert Spodick owned Lincoln theatre at this time and other movie theatres in the New Haven area including the York Square Cinemas which had a large mural photograph of the Lincoln theatre in their auditorium. The Lincoln theatre closed in 1982.

In 1986, the building was acquired by ACES Educational Center for the Arts, a local educational organization and public arts magnet school. It was used mainly for its events (private and occasionally public) until 2012, when it underwent a major rehabilitation and upgrade, which preserved elements of its Art Deco interior.

== See also ==
- National Register of Historic Places listings in New Haven, Connecticut
