= The Year of the Elephant =

Studio album by Wadada Leo Smith
- Released: 2002
- Recorded: April 18 and 19, 2002
- Studio: MRS Recording Studio, New York City
- Genre: Jazz
- Length: 60:30
- Label: Pi Recordings
- Producer: Wadada Leo Smith

Wadada Leo Smith chronology
Red Sulphur Sky (2001)	The Year of the Elephant (2002)	Luminous Axis (2002)

The Year of the Elephant is the twenty-fifth studio album by American jazz trumpeter Wadada Leo Smith which was recorded in 2002 and released on Pi Recordings. It was the second recording by his Golden Quartet featuring pianist Anthony Davis, bassist Malachi Favors and drummer Jack DeJohnette.

== Reception ==
Professional ratings
Review scores
Source	Rating
AllMusic	4/5 stars
The Penguin Guide to Jazz	3/4 stars
Tom Hull	B+

In his review for AllMusic, David R. Adler states "Both Davis and DeJohnette are credited on synthesizer, but the sounds they employ are remarkably close to the old-fashioned, analog Wurlitzer. Combined with Favors' resonant, grooving basslines and DeJohnette's loose straight-eighth rhythms the result is somewhat akin to Miles Davis in the In a Silent Way period."

The Penguin Guide to Jazz describes the album as "A surprisingly straight-ahead jazz record, strongly influenced by electric-period Miles Davis."

The All About Jazz review by Dan McClenaghan says "Smith's horn work is very Miles-like, the wounded, open horn cry, the plaintive and introspective mute work, the judicious use of silence."

In his review for JazzTimes Duck Baker notes that "Even though '70s Miles is a frequent departure point for The Year of the Elephant, jazz-rock fans may not feel comfortable with the music while listeners who usually have trouble with rock-type rhythms may be amazed to hear them used in such a creative context."

== Track listing ==
All compositions by Wadada Leo Smith

1. "Al-Madinah" – 10:01
2. "Piru" – 10:51
3. "The Zamzam Well a Stream of a Pure Light" – 8:56
4. "Kangaroo's Hollow" – 7:06
5. "The Year of the Elephant" – 9:19
6. "Miles Star in 3 Parts: Star/Seed/Blue Fire" – 14:17

== Personnel ==
- Wadada Leo Smith – trumpet, flugelhorn
- Anthony Davis – piano, synthesizer
- Malachi Favors – bass
- Jack DeJohnette – drums, synthesizer
