= Pan-African Orchestra =

African orchestra

The Pan-African Orchestra (PAO) is an orchestra using indigenous African traditions and instruments. It was founded as a 48-piece ensemble in 1988 in Accra, Ghana, by Nana Danso Abiam. Abiam died in a motor accident in Accra on 24 December 2014, in the early hours following his 61st birthday. His mission with the PAO, originally a 30-piece ensemble, had been to explore the classical foundations of traditional African music and to cultivate an integrated continental art form through new compositional and orchestral techniques. The musicians play traditional instruments from across Africa, including the atenteben, gonje, kora and gyile.

== Background ==
The idea for the Pan-African Orchestra was conceived by Nana Danso Abiam while he was a student (under Professor Kwabena Nketia) at the Institute of African Studies at the University of Ghana, when the country was inspired by a nationalistic movement that prevailed during the rule of Ghana's first post-independence president Kwame Nkrumah. According to AllMusic, "A government-funded paper in which Abiam called for the establishment of a national orchestra led to an invitation to take control of the Ghanaian National Symphony Orchestra. Although he accepted the invitation, Abiam became frustrated by the ensemble's 'colonial mentality' and 'resistance to moving from European instruments and composers.' Gathering musicians who were well-versed in the traditional instruments of Africa, Abiam formed the Pan-African Orchestra in 1988." The PAO focused on so-called "re-compositions", using traditional themes as the basis for their orchestral interpretations.

The PAO performed at the 1994 WOMAD Festival, and went on to record their album Opus I. It was released through Real World Records in 1995, and subsequently topped the international New World Music Charts for six weeks.

A youth wing of the PAO, the Pan African Youth Orchestra (PAYO), was formed in 1995 in collaboration with the National Theatre of Ghana.

In 2001, in collaboration with dance company Adzido, the PAO toured the UK with the musical play Yaa Asantewaa - Warrior Queen (written by Margaret Busby and directed by Geraldine Connor), and in 2003 the PAO collaborated with kora player Tunde Jegede.

== Discography ==
- Opus I (Real World Records, 1995)
