= Saturn, Conjunct the Grand Canyon in a Sweet Embrace =

Live album by Wadada Leo Smith & Anthony Braxton
- Released: 2004
- Recorded: April 5, 2003
- Venue: Tonic, New York City
- Genre: Jazz
- Length: 51:11
- Label: Pi Recordings
- Producer: Wadada Leo Smith

Wadada Leo Smith chronology
Lake Biwa (2004)	Saturn, Conjunct the Grand Canyon in a Sweet Embrace (2004)	Snakish (2005)

Anthony Braxton chronology
Organic Resonance (2003)	Saturn, Conjunct the Grand Canyon in a Sweet Embrace (2004)	23 Standards (Quartet) 2003 (2004)

Saturn, Conjunct the Grand Canyon in a Sweet Embrace is the second album of a live duo performance by American jazz trumpeter Wadada Leo Smith and reedist Anthony Braxton, which was recorded in 2003 at New York's Tonic club and released on Pi Recordings. This album, along with Organic Resonance, is the first recording dedicated entirely to Wadada and Braxton's duo music.

== Reception ==
Professional ratings
Review scores
Source	Rating
AllMusic	4/5 stars
The Penguin Guide to Jazz	3/4 stars

In his review for AllMusic, Scott Yanow states "A rhythm section is not needed for these two masterful musicians, who have played together on an infrequent basis since the late '60s, for they form their own themes, harmonies, and rhythms."

The Penguin Guide to Jazz says "Widely admired on first release, these are curiously disappointing sets that never seem to find the two players on common ground."

The All About Jazz review by Rex Butters says "Any project involving either of these two players is exhilarating and imaginative, but together in duet they pull aside the curtain to expose the wondrous machinations of the creative process."

In a double review for JazzTimes Duck Baker notes that "There is enormous variety of feeling and approach not just from track to track but within each performance, though describing these things is challenging."

== Track listing ==
1. "Composition No. 316" (Anthony Braxton) - 28:52
2. "Saturn, Conjunct the Grand Canyon in a Sweet Embrace" (Wadada Leo Smith) - 13:21
3. "Goshawk" (Wadada Leo Smith) - 8:58

== Personnel ==
- Wadada Leo Smith - trumpet, flugelhorn
- Anthony Braxton - saxophones
