= Condor, Autumn Wind =

Live album by Wadada Leo Smith
- Released: May 19, 1998
- Recorded: November 8, 1997
- Studio: Hayti Heritage Center, Durham, NC
- Genre: Jazz
- Length: 1:12:01
- Label: Wobbly Rail
- Producer: Wadada Leo Smith

Wadada Leo Smith chronology
Prataksis (1998)	Condor, Autumn Wind (1998)	Light Upon Light (1999)

Professional ratings
Review scores
Source	Rating
AllMusic	4/5 stars
The Penguin Guide to Jazz Recordings	3/4 stars

Condor, Autumn Wind is a live album by American jazz trumpeter Wadada Leo Smith recorded with Harumi Makino Smith. The album is dedicated to Sarhanna, Kashala and Lamar, in special memory of Dizzy Gillespie.

== Critical reception ==
Bill Shoemaker of JazzTimes noted "Condor, Autumn Wind, recorded live in Durham, shows the potential of the emerging Mid-Atlantic concert circuit for avant garde jazz and improvised music. A lot of improvisers talk vaguely about creating a space in which the music can be spawned and received, but Wadada Leo Smith pursues and achieves this goal with a unique, focused discipline on the mostly solo Condor, Autumn Wind. Throughout the program, Smith’s trumpet solos have an episodic quality, where the overall shape of the piece is altered with each boldly shaped phrase. At strategic points in the program, he complements his palette with voice, mbira, percussion, wood flute, and bike horn-like seal-horn. On three pieces, Harumi Makino Smith’s poetry (read both in English and Japanese) provides an evocative counterpoint. In all, Condor, Autumn Wind is a winding journey with many intriguing stops."

== Track listing ==
All music is composed by Wadada Leo Smith, Harumi Makino Smith.

No.	Title	Length
1.	"Hummingbirds Harvesting Nectar from the Birds of Paradise Plants"	7:50
2.	"East: Illumination: Eagle: Yellow"	6:38
3.	"Emmeya"	6:21
4.	"Special Rider Blues (For Kashala]"	7:30
5.	"Sonicboltz Wave"	4:50
6.	"Condor (For Dizzy Gillespie)"	10:14
7.	"Sunrise and Moonbows (For Marion Brown)"	3:19
8.	"Shah Ni'matullah Wali"	7:26
9.	"Song of Humanity"	8:10
10.	"Albert Ayler"	9:43
Total length:		1:12:01

== Personnel ==
Band

- Wadada Leo Smith – cover art, flugelhorn, flute, horn, maracas mbira, producer, siren, trumpet, vocals, voices
- Harumi Makino Smith – cover art, performer, poetry

Production

- Mirla del Rosario – artwork, layout design
- Robert Frenz – photography
- Mac McCaughan – design, executive producer
- Dan McCleary – layout design
- Brian Paulson – engineer
- Kashala Smith – illustrations
- Chris Stamey – mastering
