= Snakish =

Studio album by Wadada Leo Smith
- Released: August 23, 2005
- Recorded: 2003–2004
- Studio: Zerkall, Los Angeles
- Genre: Jazz
- Length: 47:36
- Label: Leo Records CD LR 435
- Producer: Leo Feigin, Mark Nauseef, Miroslav Tadic, Walter Quintus

Wadada Leo Smith chronology
Saturn, Conjunct the Grand Canyon in a Sweet Embrace (2004)	Snakish (2005)	Compassion (2006)

Professional ratings
Review scores
Source	Rating
AllMusic	2.5/5 stars
The Penguin Guide to Jazz Recordings	2.5/4 stars

Snakish is a studio album by jazz trumpeter Wadada Leo Smith recorded with Walter Quintus, Katya Quintus, Miroslav Tadić, and Mark Nauseef. The record was released on August 23, 2005 via Leo label. The album contains 15 short compositions written by bandmembers. The official catalogue explains that "this music can be a hint of what Miles Davis might have achieved in his later years had he been able to rise above the banalities of rock and jazz fusion".

== Reception ==
Derek Taylor of Dusted Magazine wrote "The program relies a bit too resolutely on ambiance and atmospherics at the expense of a consistent narrative thrust. Others followers of Smith may find otherwise, but I found portions of this set a puzzling bore. The variegated parts just don't quite congeal into a cohesive and momentous whole. While Smith's career is hardly on the wane, this date feels like a misstep when pondered against what's come prior."

Scott Yanow of Allmusic noted "This set of short sketches features the rather unusual instrumentation of trumpeter Wadada Leo Smith, guitarist Miroslav Tadic, Mark Naussef on percussion and electronics, the voice of Katya Quintus, and Walter Quintus' computer sounds. The program of sound explorations is occasionally colorful but often seems random, with Smith's trumpet being a bit inspired by 1970s Miles Davis while all of the musicians apparently focused on making unusual sounds. The brevity of the individual selections is a good thing, for few of the pieces develop beyond their original mood and tone colors. Overall, it seems a bit overly clinical to these ears, but some listeners may enjoy these eccentric sounds."

== Track listing ==
All tracks are written by Mark Nauseef, Walter Quintus, Miroslav Tadic.

No.	Title	Length
1.	"Uncoiling"	2:36
2.	"Cosmoil"	3:37
3.	"Disembodyism"	1:10
4.	"Over the Influence"	2:55
5.	"Yopo"	4:20
6.	"Black Bell Mother"	2:39
7.	"Majounish"	1:57
8.	"Kawami Wama"	5:25
9.	"Speeds Per Coil"	3:12
10.	"Neither Liquid nor Gaseous, Torn"	3:58
11.	"Gold Green Melt"	4:04
12.	"Gangah Wallah"	5:09
13.	"Rivers of Swans"	3:03
14.	"Coiling"	3:31
Total length:		47:36

== Personnel ==
Band

- Wadada Leo Smith – trumpet
- Mark Nauseef – cover design, electronics, percussion, producer
- Kayta Quintus - voice
- Walter Quintus – computers, engineer, mastering, mixing, image manipulation, processing, producer
- Miroslav Tadic – cover design, guitar (baritone), guitar (classical), image manipulation, producer

Production

- Leo Feigin – producer
- Scott Groller – photography
- Naoju Nakamura – photography
