= Myth and Mythopoeia =

Studio album / Live album by John Zorn
- Released: June 22, 2014
- Recorded: November 21, 2013, December 20 & 26, 2013 and April 1, 2014
- Genre: Avant-garde, Contemporary classical music
- Length: 48:03
- Label: Tzadik TZ 8318
- Producer: John Zorn

John Zorn chronology
Sonic Rivers (2014)	Myth and Mythopoeia (2014)	Adramelech: Book of Angels Volume 22 (2014)

Myth and Mythopoeia is an album of contemporary classical music composed by John Zorn and featuring a piece for string quartet and soprano, one for solo cello, one for a trio of piano, violin and cello, one for a duo of violin and cello and one for full ensemble, which was released on the Tzadik label in June 2014.

== Reception ==
Professional ratings
Review scores
Source	Rating
PopMatters	7/10 stars

PopMatters reviewer John Garratt stated "I recommend Myth and Mythopoeia solely based on the powerfully mysterious Missa Sine Voces"". You can look at the surrounding pieces in a number of ways—either as gravy, cold side-dishes, distractions, or some nice desserts. But the 13:25 track that summarizes the paradox that is John Zorn is a compelling reason to keep tracing the iconic composer’s career. As uneven and difficult as it is to follow, it’s certainly worth it when things like this happen".

== Track listing ==
All compositions by John Zorn.

1. "Pandora's Box" - 13:48
2. "Missa Sine Voces" - 13:25
3. "Zeitgehöft" - 9:15
4. "Babel" - 4:55
5. "Hexentarot" - 6:37

Notes

- Recorded at Huddersfield Contemporary Music Festival on November 21, 2013 (track 1), EastSide Sound, NYC on December 20, 2013 (track 3), Miller Theatre Columbia University, NYC on December 26, 2013 (tracks 2 & 5) and Studio G, Brooklyn, NY on April 1, 2014 (track 4).

== Personnel ==
- Arditti Quartet (track 1)
  - Irvine Arditti, Ashot Sarkissjan - violin
  - Ralf Ehlers - viola
  - Lucas Fels - cello
- Sarah Maria Sun - soprano (track 1)
- Talea Ensemble conducted by James Baker (track 2)
  - Nuiko Wadden - harp
  - Stephen Beck - piano
  - Matthew Ward - vibraphone
  - Alex Lipowski - bass drum, percussion
  - Matthew Gold - chimes
- Chris Otto - violin (tracks 3 & 5)
- Jay Campbell - cello (tracks 3 & 5)
- Stephen Gosling - piano (track 5)
- Jeff Zeigler - cello (track 4)

Production

- Silas Brown, Scott Fraser, Alex Harker, Marc Urselli - engineer, audio mixer
- John Zorn and Kazunori Sugiyama – producers
