= Touch the Earth =

Live album by Peter Kowald, Wadada Leo Smith, Günter Sommer
- Released: 1980
- Recorded: November 13 & 14, 1979
- Venue: Flöz, Berlin
- Genre: Jazz
- Length: 40:47
- Label: FMP
- Producer: Jost Gebers

Wadada Leo Smith chronology
Spirit Catcher (1979)	Touch the Earth (1980)	Go in Numbers (1982)

Professional ratings
Review scores
Source	Rating
The Encyclopedia of Popular Music	3/5 stars

Touch the Earth is an album by a free jazz trio consisting of American trumpeter Wadada Leo Smith, German bassist Peter Kowald and German drummer Günter Sommer, which was recorded live in 1979 and released on the German FMP label. It was reissued on CD in a compilation titled Touch the Earth—Break the Shells, with some tracks from If You Want the Kernels You Have to Break the Shells, another album by the same trio.

== Reception ==
In his review for AllMusic, Thom Jurek states about the Touch the Earth - Break the Shells reissue "This is music of the mind, certainly, but it is also from the body and the earth itself. This is free jazz that sings!."

The JazzTimes review by John Murph says about the reissue "Both wild and peaceful, Touch The Earth-Break the Shells, is an invigorating post-Art Ensemble of Chicago experience."

== Track listing ==
1. "Gebr. Loesch" (Sommer) – 4:15
2. "Touch the Earth" (Kowald) – 12:50
3. "Wind Song in a Dance of Unity" (Smith) – 4:09
4. "In Light" (Smith) – 12:08
5. "Ein Stück Über Dem Boden" (Kowald) – 3:51
6. "Radepur im Februar" (Sommer) – 7:34

== Personnel ==
- Peter Kowald – double bass
- Wadada Leo Smith – trumpet, flugelhorn, african thumb piano
- Günter Sommer – drums, percussion, organ pipes
