= Red Sulphur Sky =

Studio album by Wadada Leo Smith
- Released: 2001
- Recorded: April 14, 2001
- Studio: Killzone Music, Los Angeles
- Genre: Jazz
- Length: 52:28
- Label: Tzadik
- Producer: Wadada Leo Smith & Harumi Makino Smith

Wadada Leo Smith chronology
| Golden Quartet (2000) | Red Sulphur Sky (2001) | The Year of the Elephant (2002) |

Red Sulphur Sky is a solo album by American jazz trumpeter Wadada Leo Smith which was recorded in 2001 and released on Tzadik Records.

== Reception ==
Professional ratings
Review scores
| Source | Rating |
|---|---|
| AllMusic | 4.5/5 stars |
| The Penguin Guide to Jazz | 4/4 stars |
| Tom Hull | B+ |

In his review for AllMusic, Thom Jurek notes "Smith offers an album full of warmth and humor that is genuinely accessible."

The Penguin Guide to Jazz states "This is a devastatingly beautiful recital, calling on all of Smith's technique as well as his wonderfully poetic musical personality."

== Track listing ==
All compositions by Wadada Leo Smith

1. "Red Sulphur Sky" - 6:12
2. "Evening Glow a Shining Outward" - 4:36
3. "The Medicine Wheel" - 20:34
4. "Afmie: Purity and Poverty" - 21:06

== Personnel ==
- Wadada Leo Smith - trumpet, flugelhorn
