= Najwa (album) =

Studio album by Wadada Leo Smith
- Released: October 20, 2017
- Recorded: March 6–7, 2014
- Studio: MSR Studios, NYC; Orange Music Sound Studios, West Orange, New Jersey
- Genre: Jazz
- Length: 56:11
- Label: TUM Records TUM CD 049
- Producer: Petri Haussila

Wadada Leo Smith chronology
America's National Parks (2016)	Najwa (2017)	Solo (2017)

Professional ratings
Review scores
Source	Rating
All About Jazz	5/5 stars
Jazz Forum	5/5 stars
PopMatters	7/10
Tom Hull	A−

Najwa is a studio album by American jazz trumpeter Wadada Leo Smith. The album was released on October 20, 2017 via Finnish TUM Records label.

== Background ==
Najwa continues a series of Smith's dedicatory albums of varying size and breadth, embracing human and natural subjects. Four of the five tracks pay homage to composers or performers long or recently departed: Ornette Coleman, John Coltrane, Ronald Shannon Jackson, and Billie Holiday. The fifth and title track simply and enigmatically references "a love lost."

== Reception ==
A reviewer at Dusty Groove wrote, "Wadada Leo Smith is really on fire here – on a record that feels a lot more like something from the early 80s underground than some of his earlier work – from the lineup of performers, right down to the overall sound of the set! The group's very heavy on guitars – and features work from Michael Gregory Jackson, Henry Kaiser, Brandon Ross, and Lamar Smith on the instrument – often criss-crossing and weaving these beautiful sonic textures – powerful, but never too noisy, and augmented beautifully by some surprisingly thoughtful bass work by Bill Laswell – whose at his most subtle and collaborative here."

S. Victor Aaron of Something Else! wrote, "Wadada Leo Smith has never been one to conceal his influences but when he celebrates the geniuses who motivated him, it’s his own genius that becomes the most illuminating thing in his music. Najwa is one of those particularly bright moments in a catalog full of them."

== Track listing ==
All tracks are written by Wadada Leo Smith.

No.	Title	Length
1.	"Ornette Coleman's Harmolodic Sonic Hierographic Forms: A Resonance Change in the Millennium"	16:22
2.	"Ohnedaruth John Coltrane: The Master of Kosmic Music and His Spirituality in a Love Supreme"	14:00
3.	"Najwa"	3:31
4.	"Ronald Shannon Jackson: The Master of Symphonic Drumming and Multi-Sonic Rhythms, Inscriptions of a Rare Beauty"	11:49
5.	"The Empress, Lady Day: In a Rainbow Garden, with Yellow-Gold Hot Springs, Surrounded by Exotic Plants and Flowers"	10:01
Total length:		56:11

== Personnel ==
Band

- Wadada Leo Smith – composer, liner notes, trumpet
- Pheeroan akLaff – drums
- Michael Gregory – guitar
- Henry Kaiser – guitar
- Bill Laswell – bass (electric), mixing
- Brandon Ross – guitar
- Adam Rudolph – percussion
- Lamar Smith – guitar

Production

- James Dellatacoma – engineer, mixing
- Michael Fossenkemper – mastering
- Dan Fyte – assistant engineer
- Jori Grönroos – artwork, photography
- Petri Haussila – photography, producer
- Juha Lökström – design
- Robert Musso – engineer
- Max Salmi – artwork
- R.I. Sutherland-Cohen – photography
