= Spiritual Dimensions =

Live album by Wadada Leo Smith
- Released: October 9, 2009
- Recorded: (Disc One) June 13, 2008 (Disc Two) April 17, 2009
- Venue: (Disc One) Clemente Soto Velez, New York City (Disc Two) Firehouse 12, New Haven, Connecticut
- Genre: Jazz
- Length: 119:19
- Label: Cuneiform

Wadada Leo Smith chronology
America (2009)	Spiritual Dimensions (2009)	Abbey Road Quartet (2009)

Spiritual Dimensions is a double album by American jazz trumpeter Wadada Leo Smith released on Cuneiform. The first disc is the fourth release by his Golden Ensemble, which began as a quartet but here expands into a quintet with two drummers, and was recorded live at the 2008 Vision Festival in New York. The second disc is the first-ever release by Organic, an electric nine-piece band with four guitarists, and was recorded live in 2009 at the jazz club Firehouse 12 in New Haven, Connecticut.

== Reception ==
Professional ratings
Review scores
Source	Rating
AllMusic	4/5 stars
The Buffalo News	3.5/4 stars
Down Beat	3.5/5 stars
Tom Hull	A−

In his review for AllMusic, arwulf arwulf notes that "Both ensembles combine swirling currents of ethereal mystery with funk tropes descended directly from the achievements of Miles Davis during the last 25 years of his life."

The Down Beat review by Kirk Silsbee says "Smith shows a marked distillation in his playing and the frameworks he chooses. He plays in short bursts and phrases, made of brilliant tones, startling sounds, pungent runs and lyrical asides."

In a review for All About Jazz Jakob Baekgaard says "Smith creates a unique world of sound where rhythms are more than mere earthly creations, but rather something which aspires to a beauty of metaphysical proportions." Another review by Raul D'Gama Rose states "Every note trumpeter Wadada Leo Smith blows on his exquisite brass instrument brings a whole world of joy." Meanwhile, Dan McClenaghan notes that "With the ambitious Spiritual Dimensions, Wadada Leo Smith has created a strangely entrancing music, and one of his finest recordings."

The PopMatters review by Will Layman states "Though Smith has never compromised his dedication to freely improvised music, his sound is engaging and easy to enjoy: tart, lyrical, often delicate, and always rich in the pregnant silences between notes. He is, in many respects, the greatest successor to Miles Davis in his use of silence, texture, and rhythm in jazz trumpet."

The Point of Departure review by Stuart Broomer notes that "There’s plenty of depth and focus in his Golden Quintet, but the Organic concert seems to take the trumpeter to another level of interaction, with a band that's both more intense and more inventive. It's not to be missed."

== Track listing ==
All compositions by Wadada Leo Smith

Disc One

1. "Al-Shadhili's Litany of the Sea: Sunrise" - 12:57
2. "Pacifica" - 5:49
3. "Umar at the Dome of the Rock, parts 1 & 2" - 14:52
4. "Crossing Sirat" - 6:21
5. "South Central L.A. Kulture" - 15:42

Disc Two

1. "South Central L.A. Kulture" - 12:37
2. "Angela Davis" - 19:18
3. "Organic" - 18:07
4. "Joy : Spiritual Fire : Joy" - 13:34

== Personnel ==
Golden Quintet (Dísc One)

- Wadada Leo Smith - trumpet
- Vijay Iyer - piano, synthesizer
- John Lindberg - bass
- Pheeroan akLaff - drums
- Don Moye - drums

Organic (Dísc Two)

- Wadada Leo Smith - trumpet
- Michael Gregory (Jackson) - electric guitar (and producer of Disc Two)
- Brandon Ross - electric guitar
- Nels Cline - 6 and 12-string electric guitar
- Lamar Smith - electric guitar (on 1 & 4)
- Okkyung Lee - cello
- Skúli Sverrisson - electric bass
- John Lindberg - acoustic bass
- Pheeroan akLaff - drums
