= The Mass on the World =

Live album by Wadada Leo Smith
- Released: 1978
- Recorded: May 15, 1978
- Venue: International New Jazz Festival Moers
- Genre: Jazz
- Length: 38:45
- Label: Moers Music 01060
- Producer: Burkhard Hennen

Wadada Leo Smith chronology
Song of Humanity (1977)	The Mass on the World (1978)	Solo Music: Ahkreanvention (1979)

Professional ratings
Review scores
Source	Rating
Allmusic	4.5/5 stars
The Encyclopedia of Popular Music	3/5 stars
The Penguin Guide to Jazz	4/4 stars

The Mass on the World is a live album by jazz trumpeter Wadada Leo Smith released in 1978 by German Moers Music label. The album was recorded at the seventh Moers Festival in Freizeitpark, Moers, Germany, on May 15, 1978. The songs and album title are borrowed from Teilhard de Chardin’s Hymn of the Universe, a poetic and impressionistic account of the spiritual world initially published in 1961.

== Track listing ==
All tracks are written by Wadada Leo Smith.

No.	Title	Length
1.	"The Offering"	07:31
2.	"Fire Over the Earth"	07:38
3.	"Fire in the Earth"	05:52
4.	"Communion"	02:38
5.	"Prayer"	07:25
6.	"Kweli (Truth)"	07:41
Total length:		38:45

== Personnel ==
- Leo Smith – trumpet, fluegelhorn, flute, percussion
- Dwight Andrews – reeds
- Bobby Naughton – vibraphone, percussion
