= Tabligh (album) =

Live album by Wadada Leo Smith
- Released: May 13, 2008
- Recorded: November 19, 2005
- Venue: RedCat, Los Angeles
- Genre: Jazz
- Length: 62:17
- Label: Cuneiform
- Producer: Wadada Leo Smith

Wadada Leo Smith chronology
Wisdom in Time (2007)	Tabligh (2008)	America (2009)

Tabligh is an album by American jazz trumpeter Wadada Leo Smith which was recorded live at the CalArts Creative Music Festival in 2005 and released on Cuneiform. It was the third recording by his Golden Quartet with a new electro-acoustic lineup featuring pianist Vijay Iyer, bassist John Lindberg and drummer Ronald Shannon Jackson.

== Background ==
Smith had brought these musicians together in 2004, and in the spring 2005 they did an extensive European tour. Their world premiere at the Banlieues Bleues Festival was filmed by French filmmaker Jacques Goldstein for a documentary called Eclipse. “Rosa Parks” was written for the African American Civil Rights activist who died a month before the concert. “DeJohnette” was written for the drummer who inspired Smith to form his Golden Quartet. The final two songs, “Caravan of Winter” and “Tabligh”, were written as part of a collection of 11 compositions for a cross-cultural collaborative project commissioned by the Islamic World Initiative and the Lower Manhattan Cultural Council.

== Reception ==
Professional ratings
Review scores
Source	Rating
AllMusic	4/5 stars
Down Beat	4.5/5 stars
PopMatters	8/10
Tom Hull	B+

In his review for AllMusic, Thom Jurek states "Smith, in his sixties, is not only as inventive and adventurous as he was when he was a younger player, but his creativity and ability to direct a band into new territory is actually farther reaching than ever before. This is brilliant work."

The All About Jazz review by Troy Collins says "The expansive set reveals the quartet's versatility, ranging from atmospheric ballads and searing electronic melt-downs to spacious aleatoric detours and fragmentary collective improvisations."

In another review for All About Jazz Nic Jones states "Trumpeter Wadada Leo Smith has always carved out his own territory in the music and Tabligh is one of the best realizations of his work on record."

The Down Beat review by James Hale notes that "Tabligh is defined by Jackson’s muscular energy."

In his review for JazzTimes, Steve Greenlee states "To say the new lineup is powerful would be a huge understatement. Smith elicits a symphony of sounds from his trumpet."

The PopMatters review by Will Layman describes the music as "lyrical and atmospheric, featuring both wide-open spaces and a heaping dose of pleasing melody."

In a review for Bagatellen, Clifford Allen says that "Tabligh is an album that should be on the shelf of anyone with an interest in the past eighty-odd years of trumpet improvisation."

The Point of Departure review by Ed Hazell notes that "the band is as comfortable and attuned to Smith’s compositions as any band he’s ever led; the music is lively, even explosive at times, yet still exquisitely balanced."

== Track listing ==
All compositions by Wadada Leo Smith

1. "Rosa Parks" - 16:14
2. "DeJohnette" - 12:53
3. "Caravan of Winter" - 8:36
4. "Tabligh" - 24:34

== Personnel ==
- Wadada Leo Smith - trumpet
- Vijay Iyer - piano, Fender Rhodes, synthesizer
- John Lindberg - bass
- Ronald Shannon Jackson - drums
