= Solo Music: Ahkreanvention =

Studio album by Wadada Leo Smith
- Released: 1979
- Recorded: 1979
- Studio: The Gallery (New Haven, CT)
- Genre: Jazz
- Label: Kabell

Wadada Leo Smith chronology
The Mass on the World (1978)	Solo Music: Ahkreanvention (1979)	Divine Love (1979)

Professional ratings
Review scores
Source	Rating
AllMusic	3/5 stars
The Encyclopedia of Popular Music	3/5 stars

Solo Music: Ahkreanvention is a studio album by jazz trumpeter Wadada Leo Smith released in 1979 by Kabell Records label. The compositions were later included in his album Kabell Years: 1971–1979, with the exception of two tracks performed on Ghanaian flute ("Sarhanna" and "Kashala") that were omitted at Smith's request.

== Background ==
Smith said that he wanted "to create and invent musical ideas simultaneously, utilizing the fundamental laws of improvisation and composition. Within this system, all of the elements of the scored music are controlled through symbols designating duration, improvisation, and moving sounds of different velocities".

== Track listing ==
All tracks are written by Wadada Leo Smith.

No.	Title	Length
1.	"Sarhanna"	2:13
2.	"Life Sequence I"	12:35
3.	"Kashala"
4.	"Love is a Rare Beauty Movements 1-5"	18:27
5.	"Aura"	2:59
