= Wisdom in Time =

Studio album by Wadada Leo Smith, Günter Baby Sommer
- Released: 2007
- Recorded: May 22 & 23, 2006
- Studio: Studio Klangdach, Guntershausen, Switzerland
- Genre: Jazz
- Length: 65:20
- Label: Intakt

Wadada Leo Smith chronology
Compassion (2006)	Wisdom in Time (2007)	Tabligh (2008)

Wisdom in Time is an album by American jazz trumpeter Wadada Leo Smith and German drummer Günter Baby Sommer, which was recorded in 2006 and released on the Swiss Intakt label.

== Background ==
Wadada Leo Smith and Günter Baby Sommer first met at the "Flöz" in West Berlin in 1979. They played many concerts as a trio with bassist Peter Kowald and recorded the albums Touch the Earth and Break the Shells on the FMP label. Smith and Sommer were reunited at the 2005 Total Music Meeting in Berlin, accompanied by bassist Barre Phillips. In May 2006 they went on a tour of German cities with a final stop at the Taktlos Festival in Zürich. Then, the trumpeter and the drummer recorded Wisdom in Time in a Swiss studio. The piece "Bass-Star Hemispheres" is dedicated to Peter Kowald.

== Reception ==
Professional ratings
Review scores
Source	Rating
The Penguin Guide to Jazz	4/4 stars
All About Jazz	4.5/5 stars

The Penguin Guide to Jazz notes that "Smith's name is listed first, and the trumpet is usually the dominant voice, but it's Sommer’s delicately nuanced play that one listens to most intently on this wonderful record."

The All About Jazz review by Eyal Hareuveni states "Sommer's orchestral and super delicate approach completes the serene spiritualism of Smith, and both demonstrate assured playing and compassionate and imaginative interplay. It is quite a departure from the dense and urgent textures they played with Kowald, but at the same time this is a heartfelt homage to the irreplaceable bassist."

The Point of Departure review by Bill Shoemaker says "Both Smith and Sommer make instant reads; the music does not just coalesce as a result, but takes on an edge. It's impressive how they immediately dive into the deep end, and then, in mid-flight, make sudden, impeccably timed changes in direction."

== Track listing ==
All compositions by Wadada Leo Smith & Günter Baby Sommer

1. "A Sonic Voice Inclosed in the Wind" - 5:43
2. "Tarantella Rusticana" - 6:58
3. "Pure Stillness" - 5:39
4. "Gassire's Lute" - 8:55
5. "Woodland Trail to the Giants" - 8:08
6. "Bass-Star Hemispheres" - 11:52
7. "Rain Cycles" - 5:10
8. "Old Times Roll - New Times Goal" - 5:27
9. "A Silent Letter to Someone" - 7:28

== Personnel ==
- Wadada Leo Smith - trumpet, flugelhorn, electronics
- Günter Baby Sommer - drums, percussion
