= Red Hill (album) =

Studio album by Wadada Leo Smith, Jamie Saft, Joe Morris and Balázs Pándi
- Released: September 23, 2014
- Recorded: 2014
- Studio: Potterville International Studios, NY
- Genre: Jazz
- Length: 66:29
- Label: RareNoise RNR044
- Producer: Jamie Saft, Joe Morris

Wadada Leo Smith chronology
Sonic Rivers (2014)	Red Hill (2014)	The Great Lakes Suites (2014)

Jamie Saft chronology
The New Standard (2014)	Red Hill (2014)	Ticonderoga (2015)

Red Hill is an album by trumpeter Wadada Leo Smith, keyboardist Jamie Saft, bassist Joe Morris and drummer Balázs Pándi which was released on the RareNoise label in 2014.

== Reception ==
Professional ratings
Review scores
Source	Rating
Allmusic	4/5 stars
All About Jazz	3.5/5 stars
The List	4/5 stars
PopMatters	7/10 stars
Tom Hull	A−

In his review for Allmusic, Thom Jurek notes that "What is at work on Red Hill is the voice of a creative and surprisingly unified anarchy. There is plenty of firepower, but this is no skronk session ... the music is allowed to develop and unfold unhurriedly. There are no duels, or teams engaging in competitive musical athletics. These four highly individual voices all contribute to a vast conversation that contains many multiple utterances inside what is revealed as a bracing, new, but common language. Red Hill is avant-garde jazz at its best; on the spot, its players continually reinvent themselves and the music". On All About Jazz, John Sharpe said "Together they create six intense and densely voiced collective improvisations. Ambient mood and texture is as important as rhythm or counterpoint. Pandi in particular forces the pace with his non-stop barrage, as bass and drums form a clattering wall of sound. Saft's keyboards variously match or oppose and at times he resorts to a series of glissandos to cut through. Smith meanwhile is imperious, interacting with the others predominantly by taking an opposing stance The default position is manifest in the tension generated by the contrast between Smith's poised trumpet fanfares and the choppy continuous backing". On PopMatters, Will Layman observed "Red Hill sets its sights for the horizon. The rhythm section of Saft, Morris, and Pandi is extremely inventive, providing washes of color and texture that move beneath Smith like an undulating sea.".

== Track listing ==
All compositions by Wadada Leo Smith, Jamie Saft, Joe Morris and Balázs Pándi

1. "Gneiss" - 12:23
2. "Janus Face" - 14:36
3. "Agpaitic" - 7:53
4. "Tragic Wisdom" - 12:46
5. "Debts of Honor" - 9:37
6. "Arfvedsonite" - 9:17

== Personnel ==
- Wadada Leo Smith - trumpet
- Jamie Saft - piano, electric piano
- Joe Morris - bass
- Balázs Pándi - drums
