= Prataksis =

Studio album by Wadada Leo Smith
- Released: 1997
- Recorded: April 23, 1997
- Studio: Studio 451 at UCSD, La Jolla, CA
- Genre: Jazz
- Length: 1:03:25
- Label: Nine Winds

Wadada Leo Smith chronology
Golden Hearts Remembrance (1997)	Prataksis (1997)	Condor, Autumn Wind (1998)

Professional ratings
Review scores
Source	Rating
Allmusic	4.5/5 stars
The Penguin Guide to Jazz	3/5 stars
Tom Hull	B

Prataksis is a collaborative studio album by the jazz trumpeter Wadada Leo Smith, the multi-instrumentalist Vinny Golia, and the double bass player Bertram Turetzky. The album was released in 1997 by Golia's Nine Winds Records.

== Reception ==
Duck Baker of JazzTimes wrote, "For free-form fans, this is a great date that unfolds with many an adventure but, seemingly, no effort." J. Norris of Coda called the album "a quiet masterpiece".

Thom Jurek of Allmusic wrote, "This band was recorded live in the studio with no second takes and no edits. What falls from the speakers is how it rolled out in the studio: linear, transparent, and full of fresh dynamics in the tonal studies. Microtonality—à la Joe Maneri—is the order of the day, and it crosses with Smith's The Third World notion of melodic sensibility, where no melody is complete until every comment has been made upon it within a group. Hence, the entire world is contained in the eight selections here, which move and breathe with the fearlessness of vanguard jazz but are as earthy as Australian didgeridoo arias or King Sunny Ade's juju songs. Ultimately, it's all movement in one direction, to the heart of both player and listener in a spirit of such generosity and sophistication that it is an infectious laughter that haunts the listener long after the record is over."

== Track listing ==
No.	Title	Length
1.	"And the Future Became Fluid"	6:38
2.	"Dancing on the Edge"	10:33
3.	"Alexandra's Fancy"	7:09
4.	"Music for Confused Travelers"	8:58
5.	"Of Love and Loss"	3:37
6.	"Growing to Be Shadows"	9:06
7.	"Two Up, Two Down"	8:15
8.	"Fractured Laws"	9:15
Total length:		1:03:25

== Personnel ==
- Wadada Leo Smith – trumpet
- Vinny Golia – tenor saxophone, curved saxophone, bass clarinet, clarinet, English horn, duduk, alto flute, shinobue
- Bertram Turetzky – contrabass, waterphone
