= America (Wadada Leo Smith album) =

Studio album by Wadada Leo Smith
- Released: 2009
- Recorded: October 2008
- Studio: Orange Music, West Orange, New Jersey
- Genre: Jazz
- Length: 53:10
- Label: Tzadik
- Producer: Wadada Leo Smith

Wadada Leo Smith chronology
Tablight (2008)	America (2009)	Spiritual Dimensions (2009)

America is an album by American jazz trumpeter Wadada Leo Smith and drummer Jack DeJohnette which was recorded in 2008 and released on Tzadik Records. It was their first duo recording, a collaboration originally proposed to ECM in 1979 and rejected.

== Reception ==
Professional ratings
Review scores
Source	Rating
AllMusic	4/5 stars
Tom Hull	B+

In his review for AllMusic, Phil Freeman states "The austere stillness at the heart of Smith's music is anchored and emphasized by DeJohnette's powerful mastery of the drum kit, adding up to a record that deserves to be placed alongside Don Cherry and Ed Blackwell's Mu sessions in the avant-jazz pantheon."

The All About Jazz review by Troy Collins notes "Their interplay is measured and precise, neither overwrought nor timid, lending America an air of regal austerity—the sound of two masters engaged in an intimate musical conversation."

== Track listing ==
All compositions by Wadada Leo Smith

1. "America Parts 1,2,3" - 14:23
2. "Red Trumpet" - 7:53
3. "John Brown's Fort" - 5:59
4. "Ed Blackwell, The Blue Mountain Sun Drummer" - 10:13
5. "Rabia's Unconditional Love, a Spiritual Mystery of the Heart" - 7:08
6. "The Masnavi: The Falcon and the Owls" - 7:34

== Personnel ==
- Wadada Leo Smith - trumpet, flugelhorn
- Jack DeJohnette - drums
