= Bobby Naughton =

American jazz musician (1944–2022)

Robert Naughton (June 25, 1944 – December 3, 2022) was an American jazz vibraphonist and pianist.

== Biography ==
Naughton was born in Boston on June 25, 1944. He studied piano from the age of seven through his teens. He played in rock bands and lounge bands. After serving in the U.S. Army, he played organ with a blues band. He studied painting in art school, then began playing vibraphone in the 1960s, accompanying Sheila Jordan and Perry Robinson. In 1969 he recorded for the first time, releasing music on his label, Otic. He also played piano on his first album. He composed the score for the silent film Everyday by German artist Hans Richter. In 1972 he played in the Jazz Composers Orchestra. Beginning a year later, he worked with Wadada Leo Smith into the 1980s. In 1976, he co-founded the not-for-profit Creative Musicians' Improvisers Forum, which supported musicians and presented concerts until it was dissolved six years later. In 1978 and 1982 he toured Europe with Anthony Braxton in the Creative Music Orchestra. In the 1980s, Naughton, seeking a steady income and health insurance, moved to Providence and began working as locksmith. He recorded again in 2008, with drummer Laurence Cook and bassist Joe Fonda, leading to the album Pawtucket.

== Discography ==
=== As leader ===
- Nature's Consort (Otic, 1969)
- Understanding (Otic, 1972)
- The Haunt (Otic, 1976)
- Nauxtagram (Otic, 1979)
- Solo Vibraphone (Otic, 1979)
- Zoar (Otic, 2001)
- Pawtucket (Otic, 2008)
- Green Street (Otic, 2009)

=== As sideman ===
With Anthony Braxton

- Ensemble (Victoriaville) 1988 (Victo, 1989)
- Creative Orchestra (Koln) 1978 (hat ART, 1995)
- Orchestra (Paris) 1978 (Braxton Bootleg, 2011)

With Leo Smith

- The Mass on the World (Moers Music, 1978)
- Budding of a Rose (Moers Music, 1979)
- Divine Love (ECM, 1979)
- Spirit Catcher (Nessa, 1979)
- Go in Numbers (Black Saint, 1982)
- Procession of the Great Ancestry (Nessa, 1989)

With others

- Roscoe Mitchell, Sketches from Bamboo (Moers Music, 1979)
- Mario Pavone, Digit (Alacra, 1979)
- Mario Pavone, Shodo (Alacra, 1981)
