= Bertram Turetzky =

American classical composer (born 1933)

Bertram Jay Turetzky (born February 14, 1933) is an American double bass player, composer, teacher, and author of The Contemporary Contrabass (1974).

== Early life and education ==
Turetzky was born in Norwich, Connecticut, and grew up there. He received a master's degree in music history from the University of Hartford. He started out playing classic jazz.

== Career ==
Turetzky has performed and recorded many pieces written by and for him. Turetzky's first recording was in 1964, featuring the work of American composers George Perle, Jay Sydeman, Donald Martino, Kenneth Gaburo, Ben Johnston, and Charles Whittenberg. His recording activities continued with records on labels Nonesuch, Son Nova, Ars Antigua, and Desto. He also made a series of recordings on the Nine Winds label with improvisational musicians George E. Lewis, Vinny Golia, Wadada Leo Smith, Mike Wofford, and others. Turetzky is the most widely recorded double bass soloist, with seven albums on the Advance Records, Ars Nova Records, Nonesuch, Takoma, Desto, and Finnadar Records music labels.

Turetzky plays chamber music, baroque music, jazz, renaissance music, improvisational music, klezmer music and many other genres of world music. Music critic Michael Steinberg has praised his continuo playing. Bernard Jacobson of the Chicago Daily News described Turetzky as "a virtuoso of caliber unsurpassed by any other practitioner of his instrument today".

His edited volumes of music by Domenico Dragonetti have achieved some prominence. Turetzky co-edits a book series called The New Instrumentation; seven volumes have been published, including The Contemporary Contrabass, which he authored. Turetzky wrote an introduction to The Autobiography of Pops Foster: New Orleans Jazz Man about the early development of jazz bass playing.

Turetzky is a Distinguished Emeritus Professor of Music at the University of California, San Diego. His former students include bassists Mark Dresser and Karl E. H. Seigfried.

== Personal life ==
He is married to flutist Nancy Turetzky. They have two sons and a daughter and live in Del Mar, California.

He also plays the guitar, piano, and banjo.

== Selected discography ==
- Recital of New Music, Advance, 1964.
- The Virtuoso Double Bass, Medea Records, 1966.
- The New World of Sound, Ars Nova, 1969.
- The Contemporary Contrabass, Nonesuch Records, 1970.
- "Logs" in Tree Music by Paul Chihara, CRI, 1970.
- Dragonetti Lives!, Takoma Records, 1975.
- "Spectra" in Instrumental Music by Richard Felciano, CRI, 1975.
- "Found Objects No. 3 For Contrabass And Tape" in The Music Of Arthur Custer Vol. 3 by Arthur Custer, Serenus, 1976.
- Bertram Turetzky Plays Music By Donald Erb, J. M. Mestres-Quadreny, Will Ogdon, Netty Simons, Desto, 1976.
- New Music For Contrabass, Finnadar, 1976.
- "Inflections I" by Robert Hall Lewis, on New Music for Virtuosos, New World Records, 1978.
- "Trio for Violin, Contrabass and Piano" (with Virko Baley and Eugene Gratovich) by Leonid Hrabovsky, on 20th Century Ukrainian Violin Music, Yevshan, 1987.
- A Different View, Folkways Records, 1982.
- Intersections (with Vinny Golia), Nine Winds, 1990.
- "Ricercar à 3" in Sierra & Other Works by Robert Erickson, CRI Records, 1991.
- Compositions and Improvisations, Nine Winds Records, 1993.
- Prataksis (with Wadada Leo Smith and Vinny Golia), Nine Winds, 1997.
- "Three Pieces for Double Bass Alone" on Suddenly It's Evening by Donald Erb, CRI, 2000.

== Notes ==
=== References ===
- Rosen, Jerome (2001). "Turetzky, Bertram". Grove Music Online (8th ed.). Oxford University Press. doi:10.1093/gmo/9781561592630.article.28599. ISBN 978-1-56159-263-0. (subscription, Wikilibrary access, or UK public library membership required)
- Slonimsky, Nicolas; Kuhn, Laura; McIntire, Dennis (2001). "Turetzky, Bertram (Jay)". Baker's Biographical Dictionary of Musicians (8th ed.). New York: Schirmer.
