= Wadada Leo Smith =

American trumpeter and composer

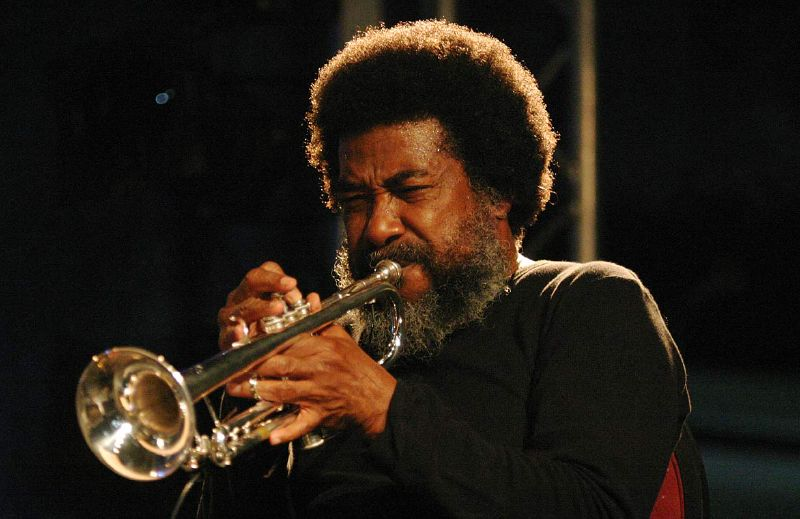
- Photo by Tom Beetz

Background information
- Born: December 18, 1941 (age 84); Leland, Mississippi, U.S.
- Genres: Avant-garde jazz; free improvisation
- Occupations: Musician; composer
- Instrument: Trumpet
- Years active: 1960s–present
- Website: www.wadadaleosmith.com

Ishmael Wadada Leo Smith (born December 18, 1941) is an American trumpeter and composer, working primarily in the field of creative music. He was one of three finalists for the 2013 Pulitzer Prize for Music for Ten Freedom Summers, released on May 22, 2012.

== Biography ==
Smith was born in Leland, Mississippi, United States. He started out playing drums, mellophone, and French horn before he settled on the trumpet. He played in various R&B groups and, by 1967, became a member of the AACM and co-founded the Creative Construction Company, a trio with Leroy Jenkins and Anthony Braxton. In 1971, Smith formed his own label, Kabell. He also formed another band, the New Dalta Ahkri, with members including Henry Threadgill, Anthony Davis and Oliver Lake.

In the 1970s, Smith studied ethnomusicology at Wesleyan University. He played again with Anthony Braxton, as well as recording with Derek Bailey's Company. In the mid-1980s, Smith became Rastafarian and began using the name Wadada. In 1993, he began teaching at Cal Arts, a position he held until 2014. In addition to trumpet and flugelhorn, Smith plays several world music instruments, including the koto, kalimba, and atenteben (Ghanaian bamboo flute). He has also taught courses in instrument making. His compositions often use a graphic notation system he calls "Ankhrasmation", which he developed in 1970.

In 1998, Smith and guitarist Henry Kaiser released Yo, Miles!, a tribute to Miles Davis's then-lesser-known 1970s electric period. On this album, Smith, Kaiser and a large cast of musicians recorded cover versions and original compositions inspired by Miles's electric music. The follow-ups Sky Garden (released by Cuneiform in 2004) and Upriver (released in 2005) were recorded with a different cast of musicians. Both line-ups featured Michael Manring on bass.

Smith's Golden Quartet (with which he has released several albums) originally featured Jack DeJohnette on drums, Anthony Davis on keyboards, and Malachi Favors on bass. After several iterations, the Golden Quartet now features Pheeroan akLaff on drums, John Lindberg on bass, and Davis on piano.

During the 2000s, Smith recorded albums for John Zorn's label Tzadik, as well as Pi Recordings. In 2008, he and his Golden Quartet released a DVD entitled Freedom Now.

Smith has lived in New Haven, Connecticut, for many years, a city where he helped create a prominent culture for creative music.

== Discography ==
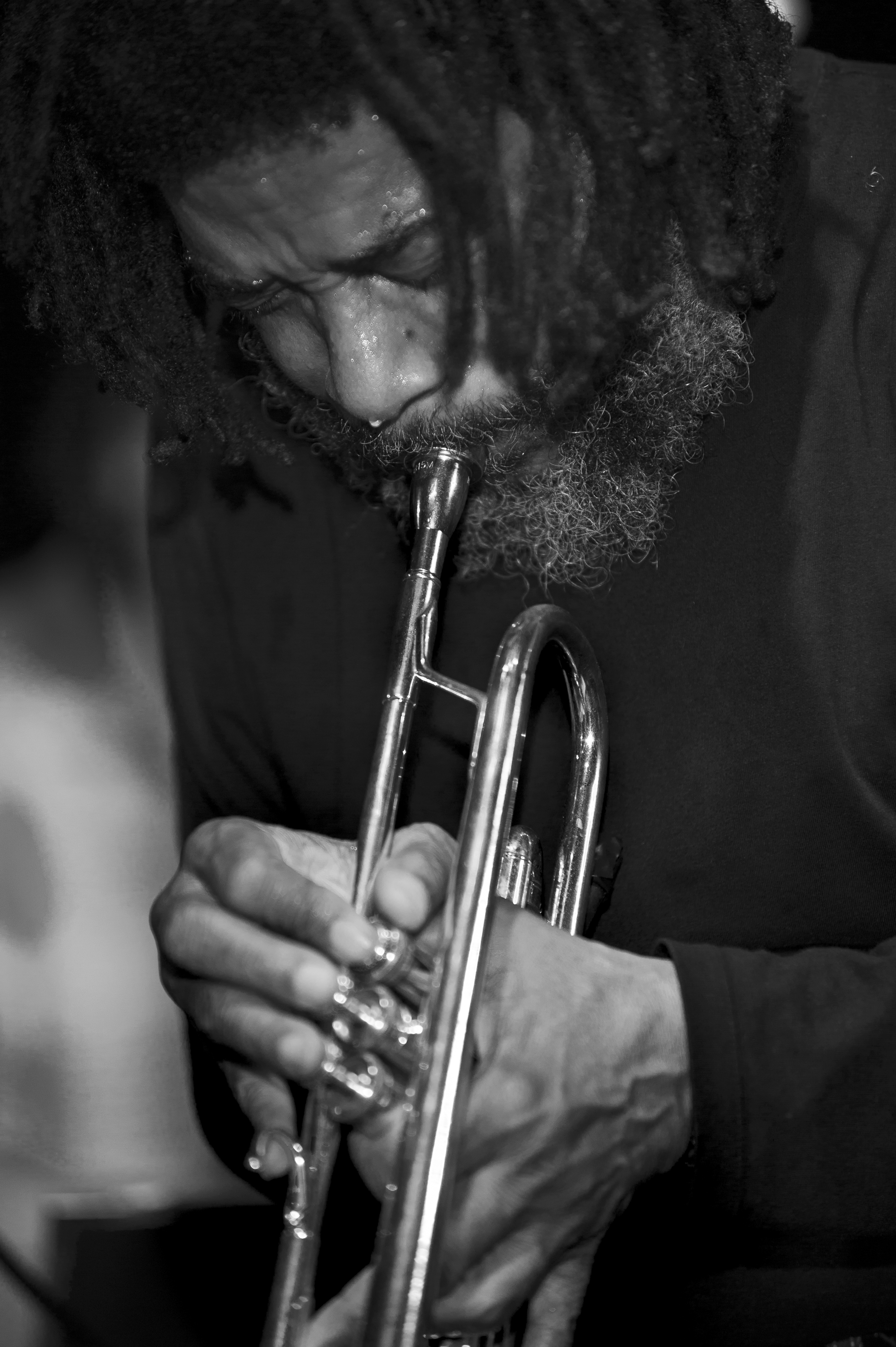
Wadada Leo Smith, Vision XIII Festival

=== As leader/co-leader ===
- 1972: Creative Music - 1 (Kabell)
- 1975: Reflectativity (Kabell)
- 1977: Song of Humanity (Kabell)
- 1978: The Mass on the World (Moers)
- 1979: Solo Music: Ahkreanvention (Kabell)
- 1979: Divine Love (ECM)
- 1979: Budding of a Rose (Moers)
- 1979: Spirit Catcher (Nessa)
- 1980: Touch the Earth (FMP)
- 1982: Go in Numbers (Black Saint)
- 1982: Human Rights (Kabell)
- 1983: If You Want the Kernels You Have to Break the Shells (FMP)
- 1983: Procession of the Great Ancestry (Nessa, 1989)
- 1983: Rastafari (Sackville)
- 1993: Kulture Jazz (ECM)
- 1996: Tao-Njia (Tzadik)
- 1997: Golden Hearts Remembrance with N'da Kulture (Chap Chap, 2020)
- 1997: Prataksis (Ninewinds)
- 1998: Condor, Autumn Wind (Wobbly Rail)
- 1999: Light Upon Light (Tzadik)
- 2000: Reflectativity (Tzadik)
- 2000: Golden Quartet (Tzadik)
- 2001: Red Sulphur Sky (Tzadik)
- 2002: The Year of the Elephant (Pi)
- 2002: Luminous Axis (Tzadik)
- 2003: Organic Resonance (Pi)
- 2004: Lake Biwa (Tzadik)
- 2004: Saturn, Conjunct the Grand Canyon in a Sweet Embrace (Pi)
- 2005: Snakish (Leo)
- 2006: Compassion (Meta/Kabell)
- 2007: Wisdom in Time (Intakt)
- 2008: Tabligh (Cuneiform)
- 2009: America (Tzadik)
- 2009: Spiritual Dimensions (Cuneiform)
- 2009: Abbey Road Quartet (Treader)
- 2010: The Blue Mountain's Sun Drummer (Kabell)
- 2011: Heart's Reflections (Cuneiform)
- 2011: Dark Lady of the Sonnets (TUM)
- 2011: Nessuno with Pauline Oliveros Roscoe Mitchell John Tilbury (IDA 035 – 2016)
- 2012: Ten Freedom Summers (Cuneiform)
- 2012: Ancestors (TUM)
- 2013: Occupy the World (TUM)
- 2014: Sonic Rivers (Tzadik) with George E. Lewis and John Zorn
- 2014: Red Hill (RareNoise) with Jamie Saft, Joe Morris and Balazs Pandi
- 2014: The Great Lakes Suites (TUM)
- 2023: The Nile (Hardedge) with Hardedge
- 2014: June 6th 2013 (Novara Jazz) with Eco D'Alberi
- 2015: Celestial Weather (TUM) with John Lindberg
- 2016: A Cosmic Rhythm with Each Stroke (ECM) with Vijay Iyer
- 2016: America's National Parks (Cuneiform)
- 2017: Najwa (TUM)
- 2017: Solo: Reflections and Meditations on Monk (TUM)
- 2017: Aspiration with Satoko Fujii, Natsuki Tamura, Ikue Mori
- 2018: The Haunt with Bobby Naughton and Perry Robinson
- 2020: Pacific Light and Water/Wu Xing – Cycle of Destruction with Barry Schrader
- 2021: Sun Beans of Shimmering Light with Douglas Ewart, Mike Reed
- 2021: Trumpet (TUM) solo trumpet
- 2021: Sacred Ceremonies (TUM) with Milford Graves and Bill Laswell
- 2021: The Chicago Symphonies (TUM)
- 2021: A Love Sonnet For Billie Holiday (TUM) with Jack DeJohnette and Vijay Iyer
- 2022: String Quartets Nos. 1–12 (TUM)
- 2022: The Emerald Duets (TUM) with Pheeroan akLaff, Andrew Cyrille, Han Bennink and Jack DeJohnette
- 2022: Two Centuries (Red Hook) with Qasim Naqvi and Andrew Cyrille
- 2023: Fire Illuminations (Red Hook) with Orange Wave Electric
- 2024: Dét, som ikke kan kaldes tilbage (ILK Music) with Søren Nørbo and Kresten Osgood
- 2024: Central Park's Mosaics of Reservoir, Lake, Paths and Garden (Red Hook) with Amina Claudine Myers

=== Compilations ===
- Kabell Years: 1971–1979 (Tzadik, 2004) – collects Creative Music – 1, Reflectativity, Song of Humanity, and Solo Music: Ahkreanvention along with additional material

=== As sideman ===
With Muhal Richard Abrams

- Young at Heart/Wise in Time (Delmark, 1974)

With Marion Brown

- Geechee Recollections (Impulse!, 1973)

With Anthony Braxton

- 3 Compositions of New Jazz (Delmark, 1968)
- Silence (Freedom, 1969 [1975]) with Leroy Jenkins
- Anthony Braxton (BYG Actuel, 1969)
- This Time... (BYG Actuel, 1970)
- Trio and Duet (Sackville, 1974)
- Creative Orchestra Music 1976 (Arista, 1976)
- Creative Orchestra (Köln) 1978 (hatART, 1978 [1995])

With Creative Construction Company

- Creative Construction Company (Muse, 1970 [1975])
- Creative Construction Company Vol. II (Muse, 1970 [1976])

With Andrew Cyrille

- Lebroba (ECM, 2018)

With Leroy Jenkins

- For Players Only (JCOA Records, 1975)

With Henry Kaiser

- Yo, Miles!(Shanachie, 1998)
- Sky Garden (Cuneiform, 2004)
- Upriver (Cuneiform, 2004)

With Bill Laswell

- The stone (2014)

With Frank Lowe

- The Flam (Black Saint, 1975)

With Maurice McIntyre

- Humility in the Light of the Creator (Delmark, 1969)

With Roscoe Mitchell

- Sketches from Bamboo (Moers Music, 1979)

With Matthew Shipp

- New Orbit (Thirsty Ear, 2001)

With Spring Heel Jack

- The Sweetness of the Water (Thirsty Ear, 2004)
- Hackney Road (Treader, 2018) with Pat Thomas and Steve Noble

With John Zorn

- 50th Birthday Celebration Volume 8 (Tzadik, 2003)
- The Unknown Masada (Tzadik, 2003)
