= Sonic Rivers =

Studio album by George Lewis, Wadada Leo Smith & John Zorn
- Released: 24 June 2014
- Recorded: December 2013
- Genre: Avant-garde jazz
- Length: 45:17
- Label: Tzadik
- Producer: John Zorn

George Lewis chronology
Sounddance (2011)	Sonic Rivers (2014)

Wadada Leo Smith chronology
Occupy the World (2013)	Sonic Rivers (2014)	Red Hill (2014)

John Zorn chronology
Fragmentations, Prayers and Interjections (2014)	Sonic Rivers (2014)	Myth and Mythopoeia (2014)

Professional ratings
Review scores
Source	Rating
AllMusic	4/5 stars

Sonic Rivers is a collaborative studio album by trombonist George Lewis, trumpeter Wadada Leo Smith, and saxophonist John Zorn. It was released in June 2014 by Tzadik Records.

== Reception ==
A reviewer of Soundohm stated "Tzadik introduces its new Spectrum series with a very special and exciting new group featuring three of the most creative wind players in new music. Friends and colleagues since the ’70s, these three musicians share a vision of improvisation and composition that is unique, virtuosic and cooperative. Performing compositions and collective improvisations, they sculpt sound and silence with masterly assurance. Surprising yet completely inevitable, this is an essential document of improvisational music in the 21st century by three contemporary masters."

== Track listing ==
1. "Cecil Taylor" (Wadada Leo Smith) – 8:57
2. "The Art of Counterpoint" (George Lewis, Smith, John Zorn) – 3:50
3. "North" (Lewis, Smith, Zorn) – 7:14
4. "South" (Lewis, Smith, Zorn) – 5:44
5. "East" (Lewis, Smith, Zorn) – 4:05
6. "West" (Lewis, Smith, Zorn) – 3:55
7. "Screaming Grass" (Lewis, Smith, Zorn) – 5:49
8. "The Culture of Gun Violence in the US" (Smith) – 5:43

== Personnel ==
- George Lewis – trombone, electronics
- Wadada Leo Smith – trumpet
- John Zorn – alto saxophone
