= Abbey Road Quartet =

Studio album by Wadada Leo Smith
- Released: 2009
- Recorded: August 2008
- Studio: Abbey Road Studios
- Genre: Jazz
- Label: Treader trd014

Wadada Leo Smith chronology
| Spiritual Dimensions (2009) | Abbey Road Quartet (2009) | The Blue Mountain's Sun Drummer (2010) |

Abbey Road Quartet is a studio album by American jazz trumpeter Wadada Leo Smith released in 2009 via Treader label.

== Reception ==
A reviewer of Soundohm stated "These quartet recordings feature the improvisational skills of trumpeter Ishmael Wadada Leo Smith, guitarist John Coxon, keyboard player Pat Thomas and drummer Mark Sanders - an ensemble that convened at Abbey Road Studios last year to commit these five pieces to tape. Wadada takes the lead, perhaps most staunchly reminding you that this is, at heart, a jazz album thanks to his florid, lyrical phrasing. The relationships formed between the instruments are an immediate source of intrigue, forming plenty of complex exchanges, throughout which Coxon - who also assumes a producer's role - puts in some sterling textural work, on 'For Mongezi Feza' laying down precise feedback formations that at times are reminiscent of Thurston Moore's most incisive and restrained outings." Marc Medwin of All About Jazz added, "Transparency is ever-present, especially on the sultry but pointillistic "For Mongezi Feza," where Smith runs scales and injects shards into what sounds like Thomas playing a celeste. Even when the music heats up, there's a welcome calm to it all where so many improvised sessions turn fiery."

== Track listing ==
| No. | Title | Length |
|---|---|---|
| 1. | "For Johnny Dyani" |
| 2. | "For Ashley Wales" |
| 3. | "For Mongezi Feza" |
| 4. | "For Grant Green" |
| 5. | "For Elton Dean" |

== Personnel ==
- Ishmael Wadada Leo Smith – trumpet
- Mark Sanders – drums
- John Coxon – electric guitar
- Pat Thomas – piano, synthesizer
