= Tao-Njia =

Studio album by Wadada Leo Smith
- Released: 1996
- Recorded: November 17 & December 14, 1995
- Studio: Capital Recording, Los Angeles, CalArts, Valencia, California
- Genre: Jazz
- Length: 43:00
- Label: Tzadik
- Producer: Wadada Leo Smith

Wadada Leo Smith chronology
Kulture Jazz (1993)	Tao-Njia (1996)	Golden Hearts Remembrance (1997)

Tao-Njia is a studio album by American jazz trumpeter Wadada Leo Smith which was recorded in 1995 and released on the Tzadik Records' Composer Series.

== Music ==
"Another Wave More Waves" is performed by Smith's ensemble N'Da Kulture. "Double Thunderbolt" is a composition in six movements created as a memorial for Don Cherry with poetry by Smith's wife, Harumi Makino Smith. On the title track, the trumpeter is backed by the California E.A.R. Unit, a chamber ensemble conducted by Stephen "Lucky" Mosko.

== Reception ==
Professional ratings
Review scores
Source	Rating
AllMusic	4/5 stars
The Penguin Guide to Jazz	3.5/4 stars
Down Beat	4.5/5 stars
Tom Hull	B

In her review for AllMusic, Joslyn Layne states "Incorporating personal philosophy and beliefs into his compositions through mood and accompanying texts, Smith creates a warm album of spiritual instrumental music."

The Penguin Guide to Jazz notes "Recent years have seen Smith personally and musically involved with Oriental culture, and this is strongly reflected in Tao-Njia. Acoustically, it is one of his most remarkable records, a rich montage of sounds that are at once new and immediately familiar."

The Down Beat review by John Corbett says "Tao Njia's three pieces are gentle, deceptively spacious compositions loaded with the gestural oomph of a master calligrapher. One might call them 'chamberish,' but that would be to miss their stylistic breadth, their Asian classical overtones and the force of Smith's soloing."

== Track listing ==
All tracks are written by Wadada Leo Smith.

No.	Title	Length
1.	"Another Wave More Waves"	9:30
2.	"Double Thunderbolt: Memorial for Don Cherry"	12:14
3.	"Tao-Njia"	21:16
Total length:		43:00

== Personnel ==
- Wadada Leo Smith – trumpet, flugelhorn, bamboo flute, nohkan, axatse, monophony-bar, Indian low bell, Japanese high bell, pre-recorded mbira
- David Philipson – two low drums, frame drums, bansuri, axatse, Tibetan temple bells
- Mika Noda – vibraphone, tubular bells, timpani
- Harumi Makino Smith – poetry
- Dorothy Stone – flute, alto flute, piccolo
- Martin Walker – clarinet, bass clarinet
- Vicki Ray – piano, celesta
- Robin Lorentz – violin
- Erika Duke – cello
- Stephen Lucky Mosko – conductor
