= The Great Lakes Suites =

Studio album by Wadada Leo Smith
- Released: September 16, 2014
- Recorded: December 20, 2012
- Studio: Avatar, New York City
- Genre: Jazz
- Length: 1:30:39
- Label: TUM Records TUM CD 041-2
- Producer: Petri Haussila

Wadada Leo Smith chronology
Red Hill (2014)	The Great Lakes Suites (2014)	June 6th 2013 (2015)

Professional ratings
Review scores
Source	Rating
Allmusic	4/5 stars
All About Jazz	5/5 stars
The Buffalo News	3.5/4 stars
Financial Times	4/5 stars
Tom Hull	A−

The Great Lakes Suites is a two-disc studio album by American jazz trumpeter Wadada Leo Smith. The album was released on September 16, 2014, via Finnish TUM Records label.

== Background ==
The album includes six original jazz compositions written by Smith, three for each disc. The compositions are named after five Great Lakes and one after Lake St. Clair.

== Reception ==
Dirk Richardson of The Absolute Sound stated, "Each of the six compositions unfolds as a suite in itself, moving through distinct though sometimes abstract themes, with the individual soloists adding shapes, colors, textures, and melodic lines within each section. “Melodic” is a critical term, for Smith is one of the great lyrical trumpeters (as was Miles) of the past 100 years, and that sensibility informs every passage, whether the pace is furious or languid, the tones declamatory or whispered. Much like Coltrane and Miles did in their classic groups, Smith has triggered a combination of vision and virtuosity in his co-conspirators (DeJohnette's command and creativity is especially mind-boggling) that makes The Great Lakes Suites a sui generis masterpiece of loosely structured free jazz, and perhaps, indeed, the stuff of legend."

Thom Jurek of Allmusic noted, " Smith's intention was to reflect the flat surfaces of the lakes and the volatility under their surfaces, but you don't need to get the concept in order to thoroughly enjoy what's on offer. Each member is not only an exceptional improviser but a composer as well. They play the material with the discipline, creativity, and intuition required by each of those talents... The Great Lakes Suites is the most accessible of Smith's recordings. Virtually any modern jazz fan can find a way inside these compositions thanks to the depth of this collective's canny communicative dialogue."

Christopher R. Weingarten of Rolling Stone said, "Smith's meditation on the "restrained, yet explosive" formation of North America's five Great Lakes isn't as grand in scope as 2013's Occupy the World (with a 22-piece orchestra) or 2012's four-disc, 19-part Civil Rights miniseries Ten Freedom Summers — but the 90-minute bustle of his stripped-down all-star quartet still stands as 2014's jazz epic." Britt Robson of JazzTimes commented, "Ultimately the greatest lake here is derived from the pool of talent and wellspring of innovations created by Chicago’s AACM alumni and their kindred spirits. These are musicians who understand that spatially oriented jazz requires depth as much as breadth."

== Track listing ==
Disc 1

All tracks are written by Wadada Leo Smith.

No.	Title	Length
1.	"Lake Michigan"	22:00
2.	"Lake Ontario"	9:18
3.	"Lake Superior"	10:39
Total length:		41:46

Disk 2

All tracks are written by Wadada Leo Smith.

No.	Title	Length
1.	"Lake Huron"	17:25
2.	"Lake Erie"	17:37
3.	"Lake St. Clair"	13:40
Total length:		48:35

== Personnel ==
- Wadada Leo Smith – trumpet
- Henry Threadgill – alto saxophone, flute and bass flute
- John Lindberg – double bass
- Jack DeJohnette – drums
