= ACES Educational Center for the Arts =

High school in New Haven, Connecticut

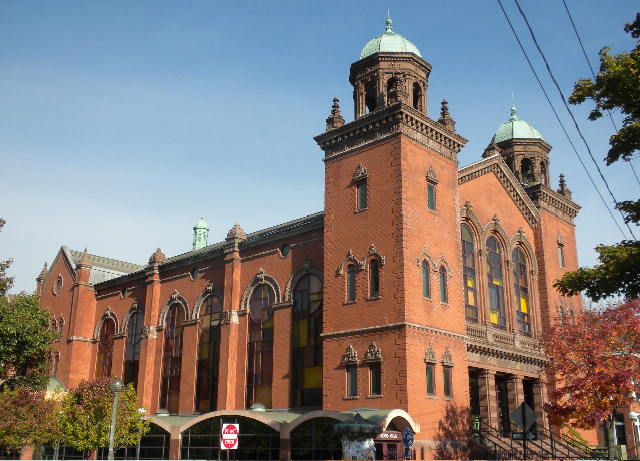
- ACES Educational Center for the Arts

Location
- 55 Audubon Street; South Central Region; New Haven, New Haven County, CT 06510; United States
- 41°18′39″N 72°55′13″W

Information
- School type: Public, High School
- School district: Area Cooperative Educational Services
- Authority: Regional Educational Service Center
- Principal: Kevin Buno
- Grades: 9–12
- Enrollment: 289
- Athletics: None
- Communities served: Ansonia, Cheshire, Clinton, East Haven, Guilford, Hamden, Madison, Meriden, Milford, New Haven, Newtown, North Branford, North Haven, Old Saybrook, Regional District #3, Regional District #5, Regional District #6, Regional District #9, Regional District #15, Seymour, Shelton, Wallingford, and West Haven
- Website: ACES

ACES Educational Center for the Arts (ECA), is an American public arts magnet high school, located at 55 Audubon Street in New Haven, Connecticut, United States.

The school is primarily located in the former Congregation Mishkan Israel synagogue with studio spaces across the street. The school has two theaters — the Arts Hall in the main building, and the Little Theatre at 1 Lincoln Street — and multiple gallery spaces throughout the main building.

== Notable alumni ==
- Lauren Ambrose (born 1978) Broadway actress and singer.
- Tom Burr (born 1963) a conceptual artist.
- Wayne Escoffery (born 1975) a jazz saxophonist.
- Jon Brion (born 1963) an American singer, songwriter, multi-instrumentalist, record producer, and composer
- Kaliegh Garris (born 2000) model and beauty pageant titleholder.
- Sam Levinson (born 1985) actor and filmmaker. Best known for creating the HBO teen drama series Euphoria (2019–2026).
- Kim Nalley (born 1969) jazz and blues singer.
- Brenda Zlamany (born 1959) painter and portraitist.
