= Divine Love (album) =

Studio album by Leo Smith
- Released: 1979
- Recorded: September 1978
- Studio: Tonstudio Bauer; Ludwigsburg, West Germany
- Genre: Jazz
- Length: 45:53
- Label: ECM 1143
- Producer: Manfred Eicher

Wadada Leo Smith chronology
Solo Music: Ahkreanvention (1979)	Divine Love (1979)	Budding of a Rose (1979)

Divine Love is an album by American jazz trumpeter and composer Wadada Leo Smith, recorded in September 1978 and released on ECM the following year. The trio features multi-instrumentalists Dwight Andrews and Bobby Naughton, with guest appearances from trumpeters Lester Bowie and Kenny Wheeler on one track and bassist Charlie Haden on another.

== Reception ==
Professional ratings
Review scores
Source	Rating
AllMusic	4/5 stars
The Encyclopedia of Popular Music	3/5 stars
The Guardian	5/5 stars
The Penguin Guide to Jazz	4/4 stars
The Rolling Stone Jazz Record Guide	4/5 stars
DownBeat	4/5 stars

The Penguin Guide to Jazz selected this album as part of its suggested Core Collection.

In a review for AllMusic, Thom Jurek wrote: "Smith acts as conductor, soloist, and his own sideman here; he opens the field on Divine Love through the authority of his players, each of whom receives the colorful possibilities he presents with unguarded openness and the desire to expand on them."

DownBeat gave the album 4 stars. Litweiler wrote, "Smith’s evolution of such an alive, complex music seems to me a remarkable achievement of intellect and technique, yet the music is thoroughly graceful and the resulting sensations all pleasurable".

== Track listing ==
All compositions by Leo Smith

1. "Divine Love" - 21:47
2. "Tastalun" - 6:38
3. "Spirituals: Language of Love" - 15:28

== Personnel ==
- Leo Smith – trumpet, flugelhorn, gong, percussion
- Dwight Andrews – alto flute, bass clarinet, tenor saxophone, triangles, mbira
- Bobby Naughton – vibraharp, marimba, bells
- Lester Bowie, Kenny Wheeler – trumpet (track 2)
- Charlie Haden – bass (track 3)
