= Atenteben =

Ghanaian bamboo flute

The atenteben (atɛntɛbɛn) is a bamboo flute from Ghana. It is played vertically, like the European recorder, and, like the recorder, can be played diatonically as well as chromatically. Although originally used as a traditional instrument (most often in funeral processions), beginning in the 20th century it has also been used in contemporary and classical music. Several players have attained high levels of virtuosity and are able to play Western as well as African music on the instrument.

The instrument originated with the Akan ethnic group of south-central Ghana, particularly in the region of the Kwahu Plateau. It was first popularized throughout the nation by the Ghanaian musicologist Ephraim Amu (1899–1995). It was also featured in the Pan-African Orchestra led by Nana Danso Abiam, and Dela Botri, a former member of the Orchestra, is among Ghana's foremost exponents of the instrument. Since 2004, Botri has combined the atenteben with hiplife music on his recordings.

The instrument is used in many schools and universities across Ghana, both as a solo and ensemble instrument. An instruction manual for the atenteben has been written by Kwasi Aduonum (born 1939), a Ghanaian educator, scholar, and composer from the Kwahu Plateau region.

The Nigerian composer Akin Euba featured a children's atenteben ensemble in his opera Chaka: An Opera in Two Chants (1970).

The atenteben flute is one of the most versatile musical instruments found in Ghana. The modern atenteben flute, built in B flat and C, was developed by the musicologist, composer, and flutist Ephraim Amu (1899-1995), whose pioneering work established a notated musical tradition for the instrument and included the instrument into the curriculum of major educational institutions in Ghana, notably, the Achimota Secondary School and University of Ghana.

The B flat atenteben is a transposing instrument, i.e. its music is written in a tone higher than the actual sounds, but a written music for the C atenteben (also referred to as atenteben-ba) directly agrees with the sounds on piano.

It is an end-blown instrument with six top holes and one bottom hole. Its embouchure at the mouth of the pipe consists of a piece of wood (fipple) made to fit tightly into the pipe with a narrow slit through which sound is produced by blowing.

The instrument originates from Tweneduruase in the Kwahu Plateau of south-central Ghana. The Kwahus are part of the Akan tribes of Ghana, sharing a boundary with the Akyem in the south and east and with the Asante in the north and west.

Atenteben comprises two Akan names, i.e., "atente" and "ben". Atente is a plural word derived from otente, the name of an Akan traditional hand drum with two heads covering both ends - thus, "one otente drum" but "two atente drums", and "ben" means flute or an instrument of the aerophones family. The atente drums were the principal instruments that accompanied this flute, hence the name atenteben (or the flute accompanied by the atente drums).

The early 20th-century atenteben flute (now obsolete) is five-holed and horizontally-blown with four top holes and one bottom hole. Traditionally, its music was pentatonic or hexatonic and associated with funerals more than with recreational activities. The instrument was popular through the first half of the 20th century but declined in the late 1950s in favor of the modern atenteben.

Repertoire for the modern atenteben was usually written in C Diatonic or C Mixolydian. This limitation was due to the absence of a playing technique that could produce the accidental sounds of the flute. Amu wrote extensively for the atenteben choir comprising as large as 16 to 32 players, sometimes in combination with a choir and non-melodic percussion instruments. J. H. K. Nketia, K. Aduonum, Akin Euba are among those who have written for atenteben and other African and/or Western instruments.

In 1979, the neo-traditional art music composer and founder of the Pan African Orchestra of Ghana, Nana Danso Abiam (b. 1953) introduced chromaticism and atonality in atenteben music with a new fingering mechanism that he had developed at the Institute of African Studies, University of Ghana, Legon. This playing mechanism employed for the first time, cross-fingerings and halving-fingerings among other over-blowing techniques that produced the entire range of chromatic and harmonic sounds of the flute.

Today, atenteben music attracts a large following. Composers of diverse backgrounds have come to recognize the ease with which the instrument can be adapted to different genres of music.

Its tuning, though, is yet to be perfected. Because different sizes of bamboo offshoot are utilized in its construction, microtonal disparities sometimes do occur in the main octaves making ensemble playing difficult. It also requires a fine-tuning device to enable it to accommodate other instruments whose overall tuning may be slightly sharp or flat.

== See also ==
- Music of Ghana
- Bamboo musical instruments
