= Grammy Award for Best Chamber Music/Small Ensemble Performance =

Music award category

Grammy Award for Best Small Ensemble Performance
- Awarded for: quality performances by a small ensemble
- Country: United States
- Presented by: National Academy of Recording Arts and Sciences
- First award: 1997
- Currently held by: Caroline Shaw & So Percussion – Rectangles and Circumstance (2025)
- Website: grammy.com

The Grammy Award for Best Chamber Music/Small Ensemble Performance) has been awarded since 1997. In its early years, its title included the addition "(with or without a conductor)" and up to 2012 it was known as Best Small Ensemble Performance..

In 1991 the Grammy for Best Chamber Music Performance also included small ensemble performances.

== 2012 overhaul and 2013 renaming ==
In 2012 the category was combined with the Best Chamber Music Performance category.

The restructuring of these categories was a result of the Recording Academy's wish to decrease the list of categories and awards. According to the Academy, "the Chamber category was folded into the Small Ensemble category, the only distinction having been the number of players in the group (Chamber being smaller), and the fact that Small Ensemble recording could, though not necessarily, employ a conductor." In the new structure, recordings are eligible if the ensemble contains 24 or fewer members, not including the conductor.

In 2013, the category was renamed as Best Chamber Music/Small Ensemble Performance.

The award goes to the winning ensemble and its conductor (if applicable). The producer(s) and engineer(s) also receive an award if they have worked on over 50% of playing time on the album.

Years reflect the year in which the Grammy Awards were presented, for works released in the previous year.

== Winners and nominees ==
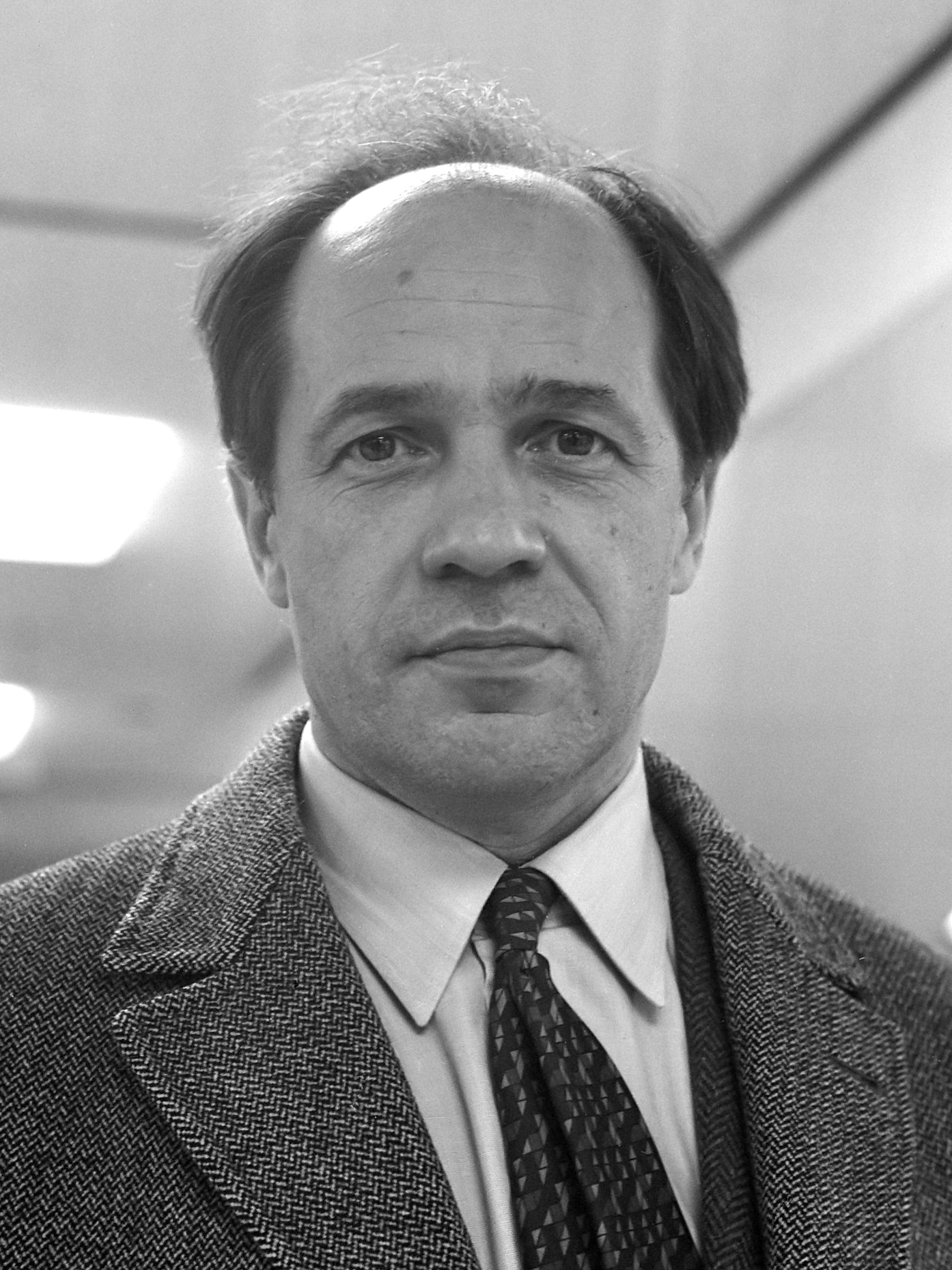
Two-time winner Pierre Boulez.

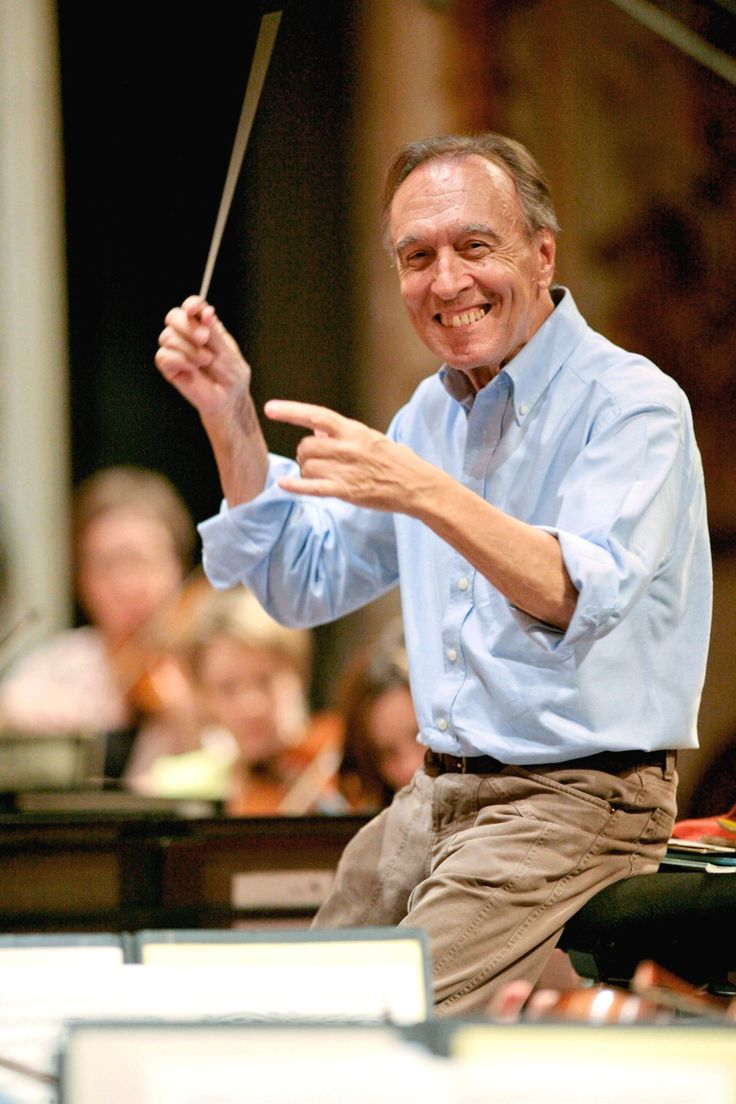
Claudio Abbado won in 1998 with the Berliner Philharmonic.

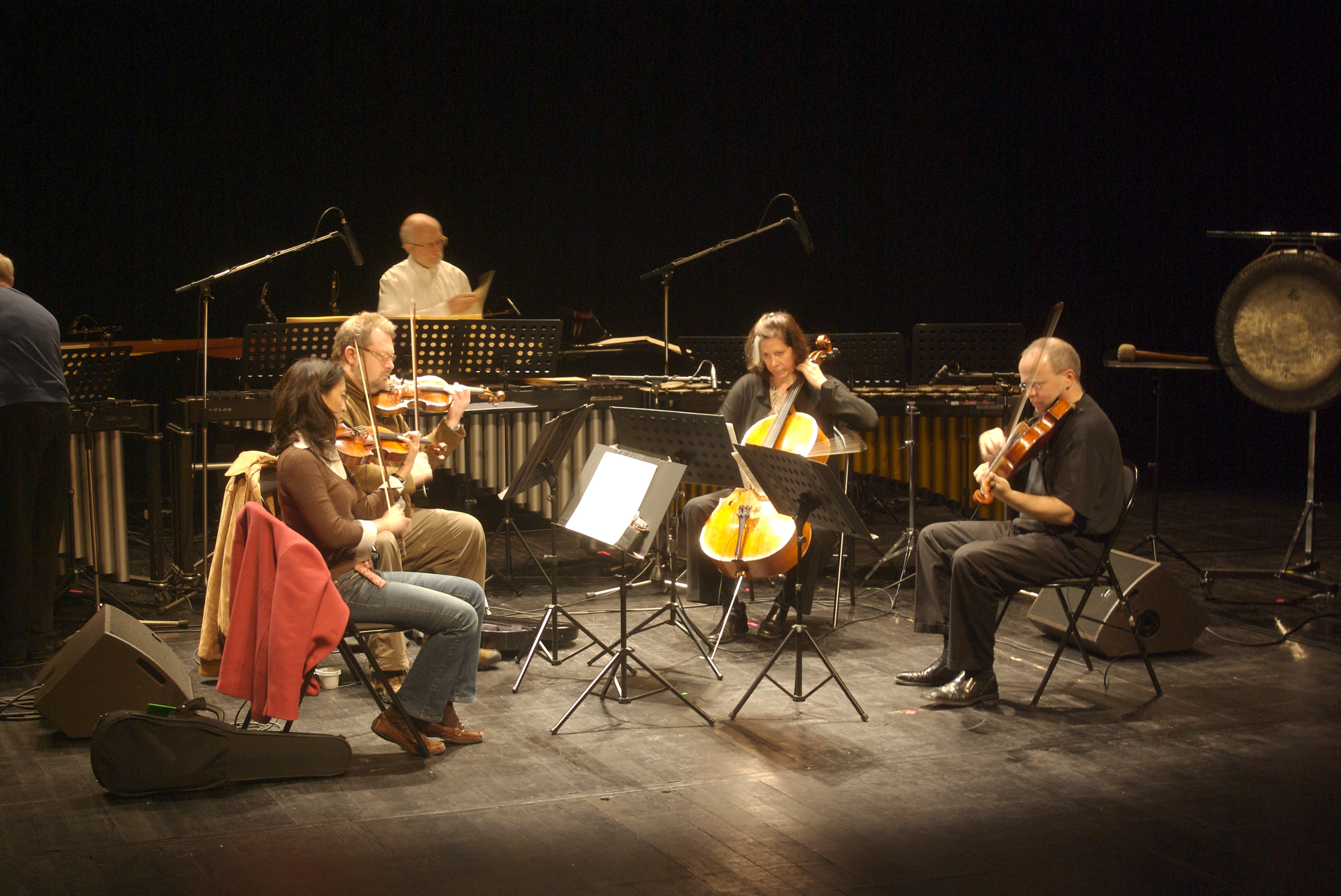
1999 winners Steve Reich and Musicians.

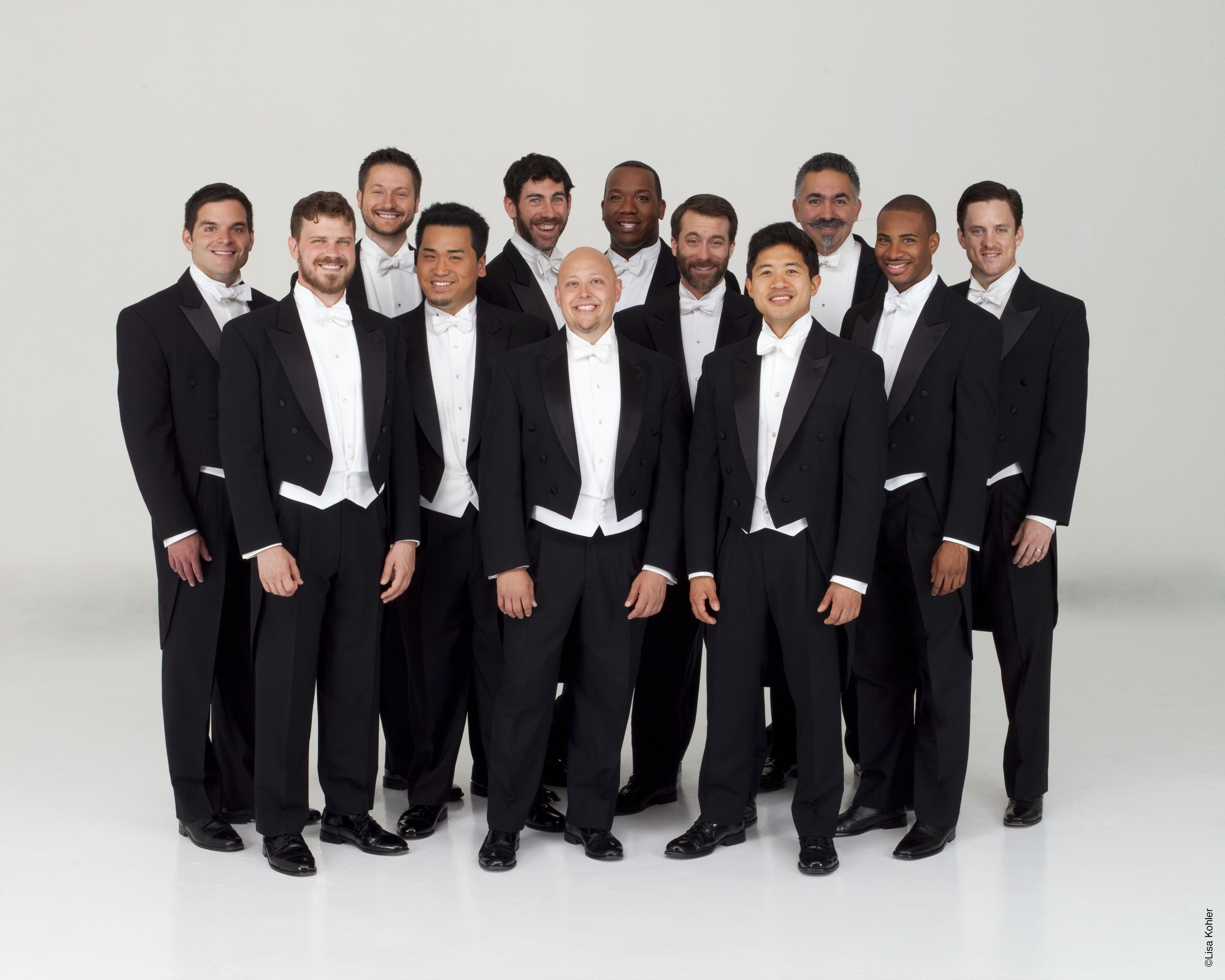
Two-time winners, the vocal ensemble Chanticleer.

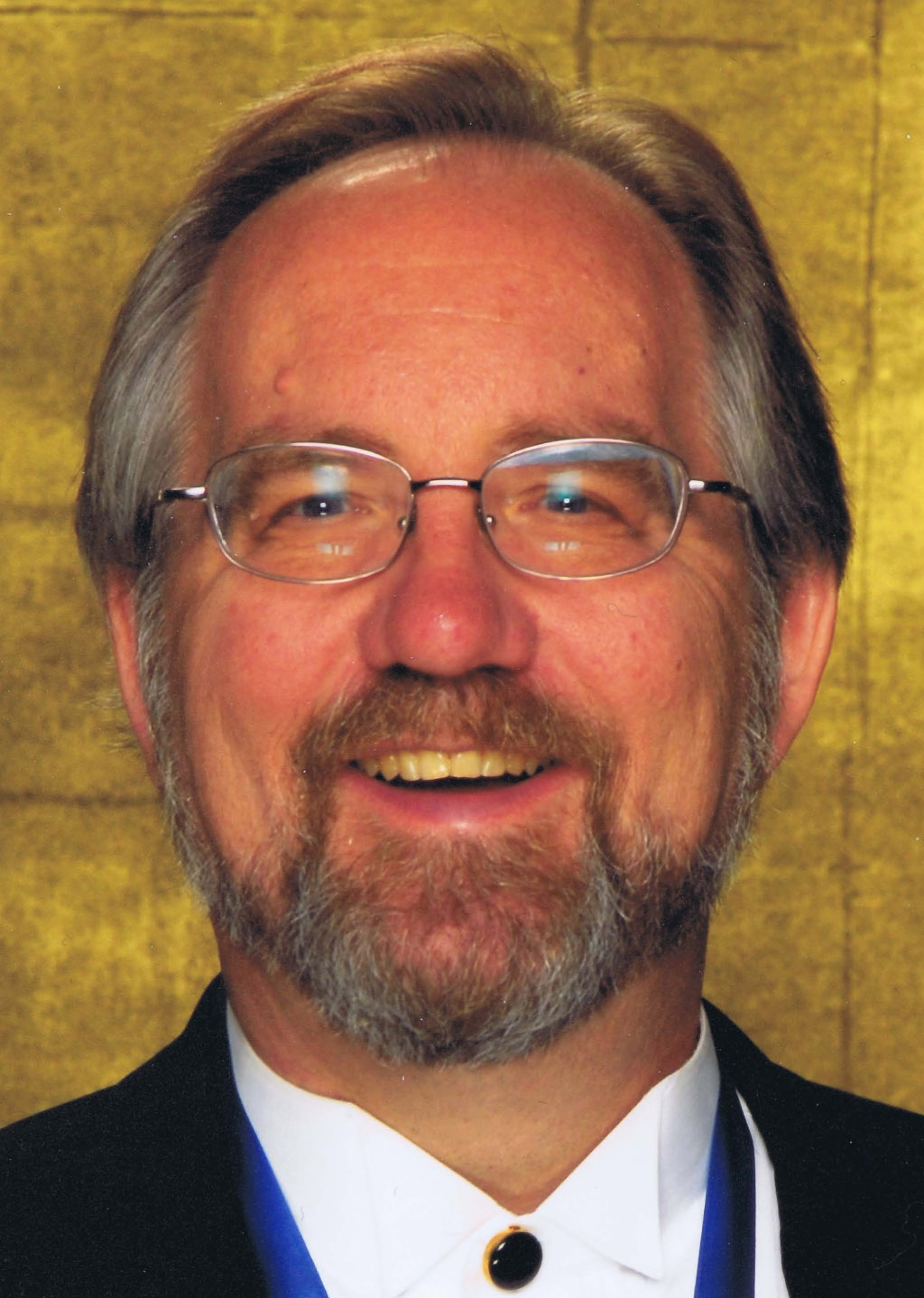
Conductor Jeff von der Schmidt has won twice, both times alongside the Southwest Chamber Music.

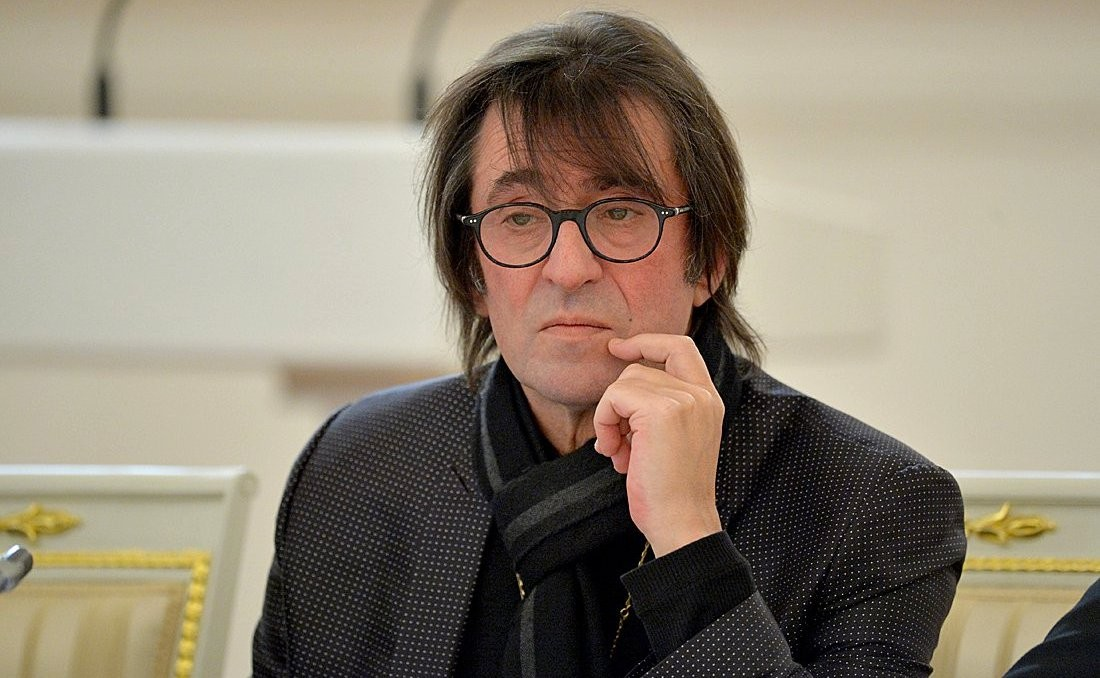
Russian conductor Yuri Bashmet won in 2008.

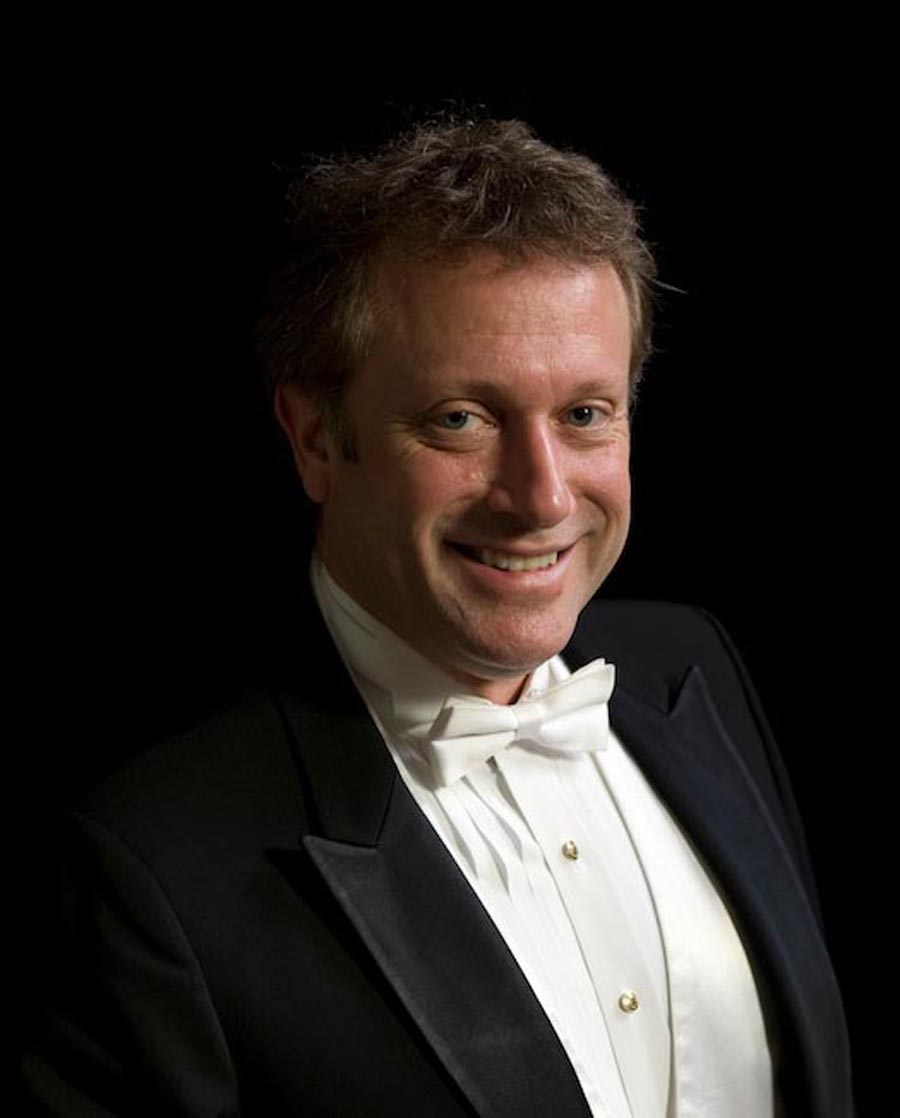
Charles Bruffy won the award in 2009 with the Phoenix Chorale.

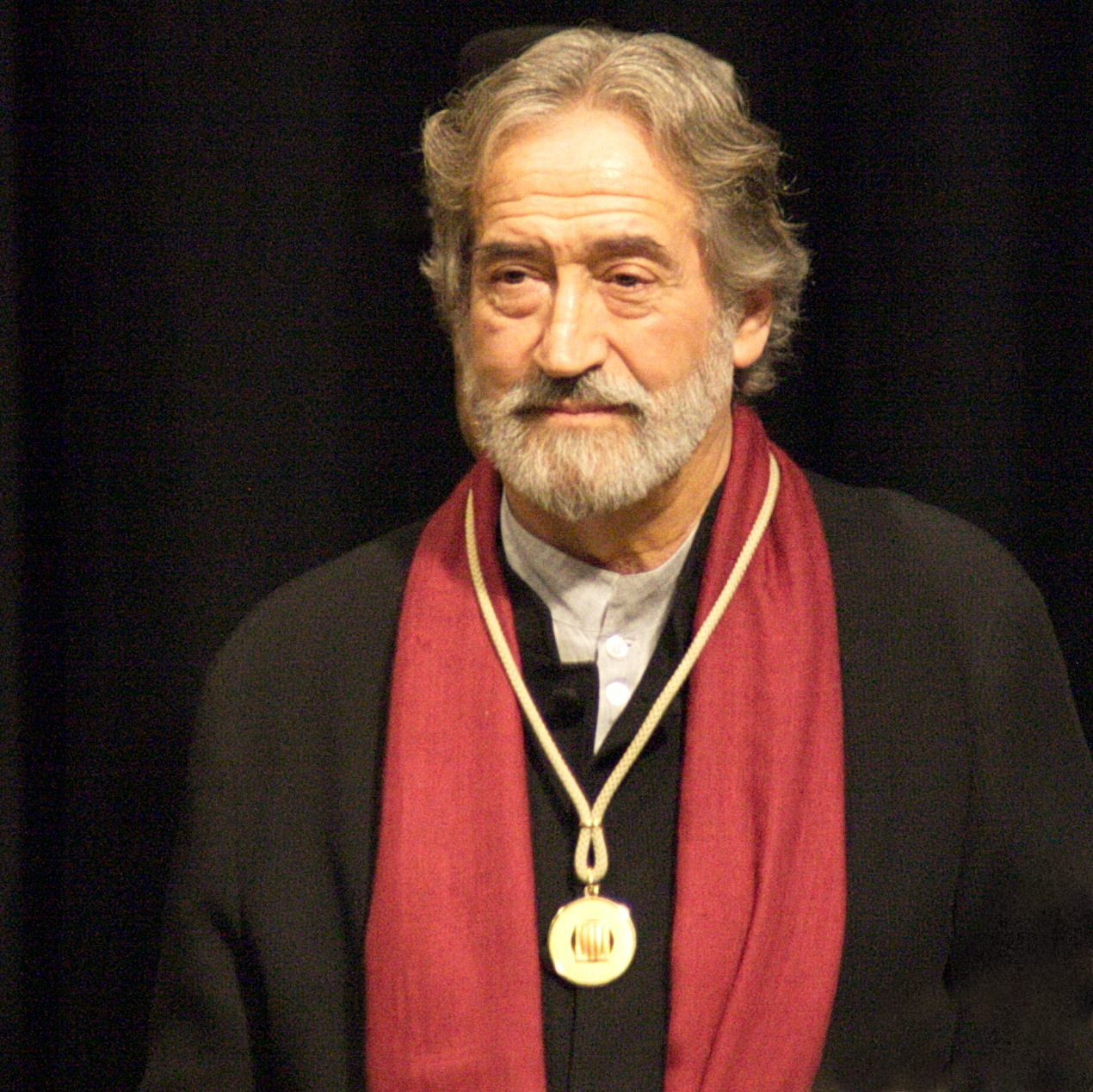
Spanish conductor Jordi Savall won in 2011 alongside Hespèrion XXI and La Capella Reial de Catalunya.

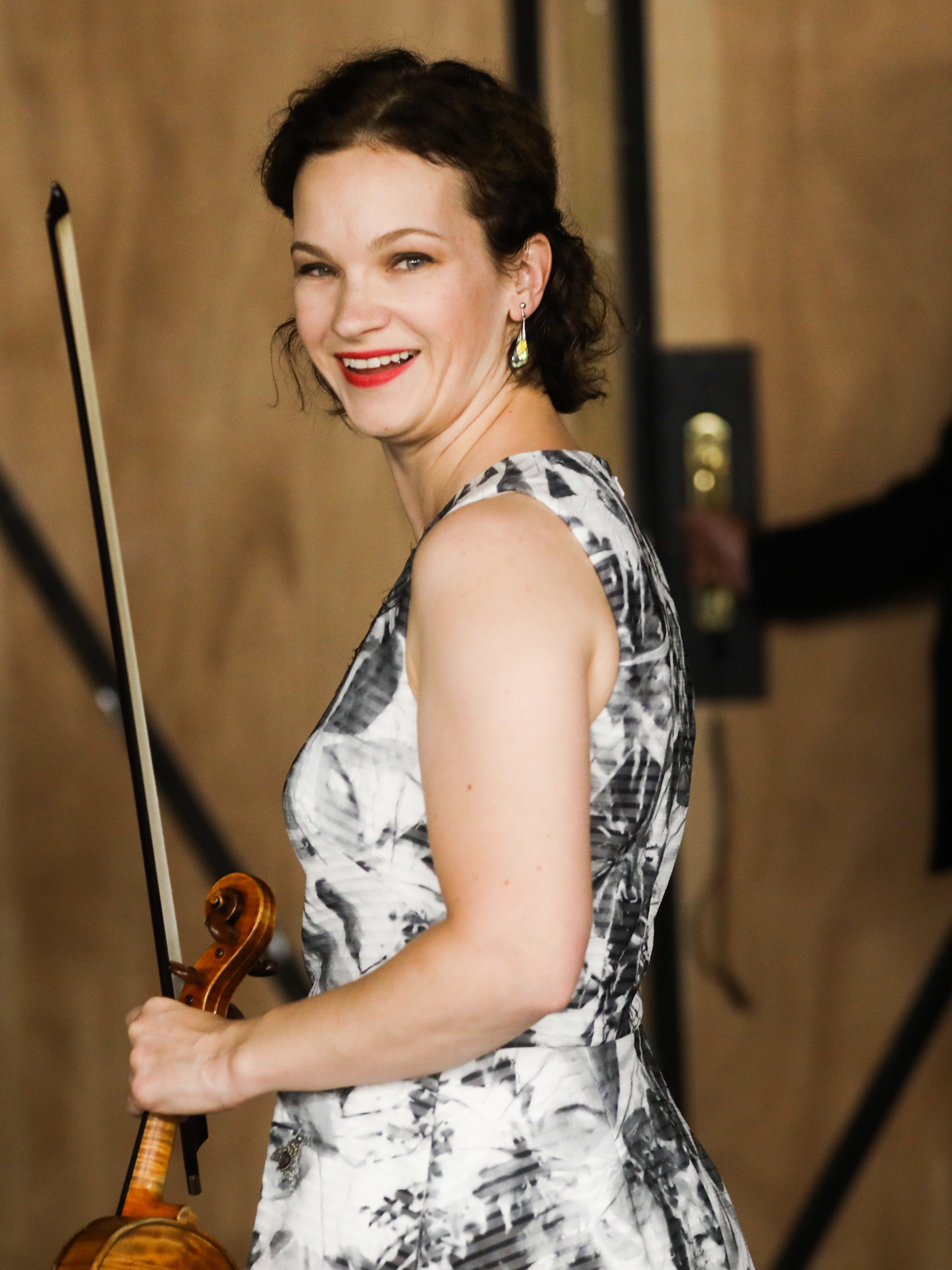
American violinist Hilary Hahn won in 2015 with Cory Smythe.

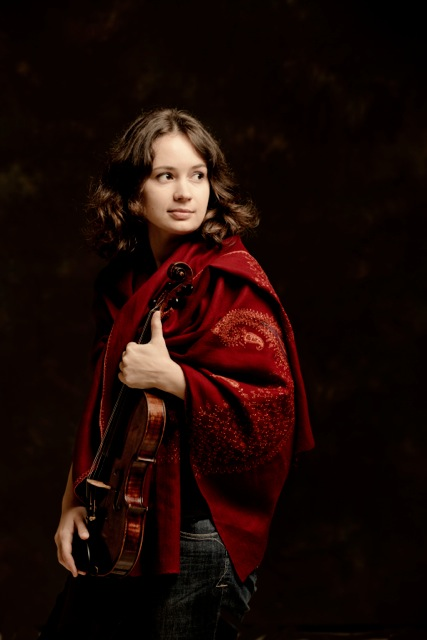
Violinist Patricia Kopatchinskaja won in 2018 alongside the Saint Paul Chamber Orchestra.

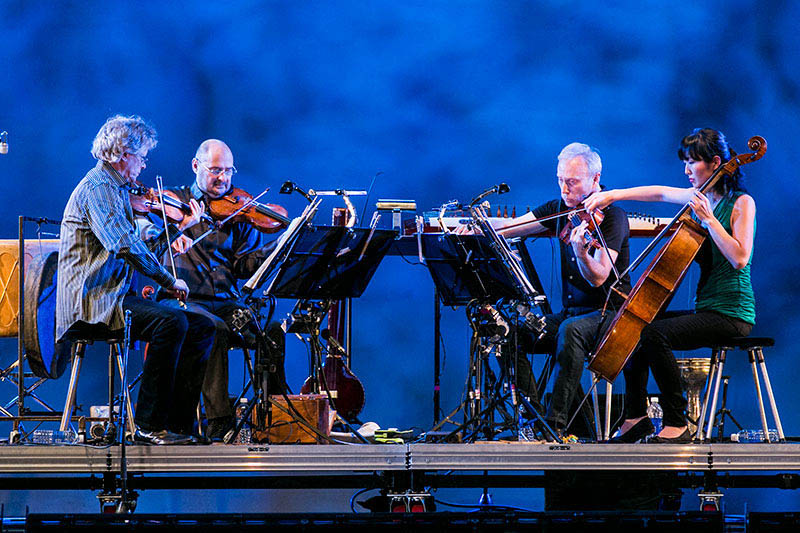
2019 winners Kronos Quartet.

| Year | Recipient(s) | Work | Nominees | Ref. |
|---|---|---|---|---|
| 1997 | Pierre Boulez (conductor) and the Ensemble Inter-Contemporain | Boulez: ...Explosante-Fixe... | Gidon Kremer – Hommage a Piazzola; Oliver Knussen – Matthews: Suns Dance; New Century Chamber Orchestra – Shostakovish: Written with the Heart's Blood; Federico Maria Sardelli – Vivaldi: Concerti Per Molti Istromenti | |
| 1998 | Claudio Abbado (conductor), Berliner Philharmonic | "Hindemith: Kammermusik No. 1 With Finale 1921, Op. 24, No. 1" | Sian Edwards, conductor; Ensemble Modern – Adams: Chamber Symphony; Shaker Loops; Phrygian Gates for Solo Piano; Reinhard Goebel, conductor; Musica Antiqua Koln – Chaconne (Works of Blow, Corelli, Muffat, Etc.); Peter Phillips, conductor; The Tallis Scholars – Ockeghem: Missa De Plus En Plus, Etc./Binchois: Missa Au Travail Suis, Etc.); Philippe Herreweghe, conductor; Ensemble Vocal Europeen – Schein: The Fountains of Israel - Sacred Madrigals (O Herr, Ich Bin Dein Knecht; Ich Lasse Dich Nicht, Etc.); Philip Pickett, conductor; Musicians of the Globe – Shakespeare's Musick - Songs and Dances from Shakespeare's Plays (Works Of Byrd, Dowland, Holborne, Etc.) | |
| 1999 | Steve Reich (conductor), Steve Reich and Musicians | Reich: Music for 18 Musicians | Alexander Blachly, conductor; Pomerium – Creator of the Stars - Christmas Music for Earlier Times (Works of De Lassus, Du Fay, Byrd, Etc.); Michael Riesman, conductor; Gyuto Monks; Monks of the Drukpa Order – Glass: Kundun - Music from the Original Soundtrack; Andrew Manze, conductor; Academy of Ancient Music – Handel: Concerti Grossi, Op. 6 (Nos. 1 - 12); Steve Reich and Musicians – Reich: Music for 18 Musicians; James Rives-Jones, conductor; Voices of Change – Voces Americanas (Works of Rodriguez, Lavista, Sierra, Etc.) | |
| 2000 | Joseph Jennings (conductor) and Chanticleer | Colors of Love - Works of Thomas, Stucky, Tavener & Rands | Moscow Soloists – Brahms: Quintet in B Minor for Viola & Strings Arr. By Bashmet/Shostakovich: Thirteenth String Quartet in B Flat Minor Arr. By A. Tchaikovsky; Joseph Jennings, conductor; Chanticleer – Colors of Love (Works of Thomas, Stucky, Tavener, Rands, Etc.); Federico Maria Sardelli, conductor; Modo Antiquo – Corelli: Concerti Grossi, Op. 6, Nos. 7 - 12; René Jacobs, conductor; Akademie für Alte Musik Berlin – Scarlatti: Il Primo Omicidio; Pierre Boulez, conductor; Ensemble intercontemporain – "Schoenberg: Pierrot Lunaire, Op. 21; Herzegewächse, Op. 20; Ode To Napoleon Buonaparte, Op. 41 | |
| 2001 | Christian Gausch (producer), Wolf-Dieter Karwatky (engineer) and the Orpheus Chamber Orchestra | Shadow Dances (Stravinsky Miniatures - Tango; Suite No. 1; Octet, etc.) | Reinhard Goebel, conductor; Musica Antiqua Köln – Telemann: String Concertos (Con. Polonais In G Maj.; Divertimento In B Flat Maj., Etc.); The 12 Cellists of the Berlin Philharmonic – South American Getaway (Works of Villa-Lobos, Piazzolla, Salgan, Etc.); Claudio Abbado, conductor – Hindemith: Kammermusik Nr. 2, 3, 6 & 7; Jordi Savall, conductor; Hespèrion XXI – Diáspora Sefardí (Por que llorax blanca niña; Las Estrellas de los cielos) | |
| 2002 | Helmut Mühle (producer), Philipp Nedel (engineer), Gidon Kremer (producer & artist) and Kremerata Baltica | After Mozart | Jordi Savall, conductor; La Capella Reial de Catalunya, Alia Vox – Alfons V El Magnànim - El Cancionero De Montecassino; Peter Phillips, conductor; The Tallis Scholars – Morales: Missa Si Bona Suscepimus; Hervé Niquet, conductor; Le Concert Spirituel – Boismortier: Sérénades Françaises (Daphnis Et Chloé: Chaconne; Fragments Mélodiques; Concerto Pour Basson, etc.); Kristjan Järvi, conductor; Absolute Ensemble – Absolution (Mahoney: Dance Machine/Schnyder: Zoom Out/Sumera: Play for 10, Etc.) | |
| 2003 | Steve Barnett (producer), Preston Smith (engineer), Joseph Jennings (conductor), Chanticleer & Handel & Haydn Society of Boston | Tavener: Lamentations and Praises | Martyn Brabbins, conductor; Claron McFadden, soprano; Nash Ensemble & Julia Watson, narrator – Birtwistle: The Woman and the Hare; Dufay Collective – Cancionero: Music for the Spanish Court 1470-1520; Kremerata Baltica & Gidon Kremer, violin/conductor – Enescu: Octet, Op. 7; Quintet, Op. 29; Steven Richman, conductor; Harmonie Ensemble New York – Stravinsky: Histoire Du Soldat Suite; Joseph Jennings, conductor; Chanticleer – Tavener: Lamentations and Praises | |
| 2004 | Jeff von der Schmidt (conductor) and Southwest Chamber Music | "Chávez: Suite for Double Quartet" | Europa Galante – Vivaldi: Mandolin Concertos; New London Consort – Songs of Angels; René Jacobs, conductor; Concerto Vocale – Monteverdi: Madrigali Guerrieri Ed Amorosi; Ensemble Modern – Goebbels: Eislermaterial | |
| 2005 | Jeff von der Schmidt (conductor) and Southwest Chamber Music | Chávez - Complete Chamber Music, Vol. 2 | Yehudi Wyner, conductor – Wyner: The Mirror; Passover Offering, Etc.; Jeanne Lamon, conductor; Tafelmusik Baroque Orchestra – Rameau: Dardanus; Le Temple De La Gloire; Bill Ives, conductor; Choir of Magdalen College, Oxford – Gibbons: with a Merrie Noyse (This is the Record of John; Almighty and Everlasting God, Etc.); Musica Antiqua Köln – Biber: Harmonia Artificiosa | |
| 2006 | Pierre Boulez (conductor), Hilary Summers (performer), and Ensemble Intercontemporain | Boulez: Le Marteau Sans Maître, Dérive 1 & 2 | Jeff von der Schmidt, conductor; Southwest Chamber Music & Tambuco Percussion Ensemble – Chávez: Complete Chamber Music, Vol. 3; Nicholas White, conductor; The Tiffany Consort – O Magnum Mysterium; David Hoose, conductor; Collage New Music – Harbison: Mottetti Di Montale; David Colson, conductor – Ancient Voices of Children | |
| 2007 | Peter Rutenberg (conductor) and Los Angeles Chamber Singers' Cappella | Padilla: Sun of Justice | 12 Cellists of Berliner Philharmoniker – Angel Dances; Harry Christophers, conductor; The Sixteen – Ikon; Jordi Savall, conductor; Hespèrion XXI & La Capella Reial de Catalunya – Miguel de Cervantes — Don Quijote De La Mancha — Romances y Músicas; Yuri Bashmet, conductor; Moscow Soloists – Shostakovich/Sviridov/Vainberg: Chamber Symphonies | |
| 2008 | Yuri Bashmet (conductor) and Moscow Soloists; Michael Brammann, engineer; Philipp Nedel, producer | Stravinsky: Apollo, Concerto In D; Prokofiev: 20 Visions Fugitives | Stile Antico – Music for Compline; Kenneth Slowik, conductor; Santa Fe Pro Musica – Mahler: Das Lied Von Der Erde; Frank Proto, conductor; Ensemble Sans Frontiere – Bridges - Eddie Daniels Plays the Music of Frank Proto; Swiss Baroque Soloists – Bach: Brandenburg Concertos | |
| 2009 | Charles Bruffy (conductor) and Phoenix Chorale | Spotless Rose: Hymns To The Virgin Mary | Meredith Monk & Vocal Ensemble – Monk: Impermanence; Reinbert de Leeuw, conductor; Schoenberg Ensemble – Im Wunderschoenen Monat Mai; Roman Balashov, conductor; Moscow Soloists – Tan Dun: Pipa Concerto; Hayashi: Viola Concerto; Takemitsu: Nostalgia; Oyvind Gimse, conductor; TrondheimSolistene – Divertimenti | |
| 2010 | Paul Hillier (conductor); Robina G. Young, producer; Brad Michel, engineer/mixer and Ars Nova Copenhagen & Theatre of Voices | Lang, David: The Little Match Girl Passion | Chamber Orchestra of Europe (Simon Fletcher) – Vivaldi: Concertos; Stile Antico – Song of Songs; Peter Phillips, conductor; The Tallis Scholars – Josquin: Missa Malheur Me Bat; Monica Huggett, conductor; Ensemble Sonnerie – Bach: Orchestral Suites for a Young Prince | |
| 2011 | Jordi Savall, conductor; Hespèrion XXI & La Capella Reial de Catalunya | Dinastia Borja | Noel Edison, conductor; Elora Festival Singers – Whitacre, Eric: Choral Music; Peter Phillips, conductor; The Tallis Scholars – Victoria: Lamentations of Jeremiah; Oyvind Gimse & Geir Inge Lotsberg, conductors; TrondheimSolistene – Trondheimsolistene - In Folk Style; Harry Christophers, conductor; The Sixteen – Ceremony And Devotion - Music for The Tudors | |
| 2012 | Rinde Eckert (librettist/performer); Steven Mackey (composer/performer); David Frost, producer; Eighth Blackbird | Mackey: Lonely Motel - Music from Slide | Gabriela Frank (composer and performer) and Alias Chamber Ensemble – Frank: Hilos; Richard Savino (conductor) and El Mundo – The Kingdoms of Castille; Patrick Dupré Quigley (conductor) and Seraphic Fire – A Seraphic Fire Christmas; The Bay Brass – Sound The Bells! | |
| 2013 | Eighth Blackbird | Meanwhile | Modern Mandolin Quartet – Americana; ZOFO Duet – Mind Meld; Boston Symphony Chamber Players – Profanes et Sacrées; Los Angeles Percussion Quartet – Rupa-Khandha | |
| 2014 | Brad Wells & Roomful of Teeth | Roomful of Teeth | Leonidas Kavakos & Enrico Pace – Beethoven: Violin Sonatas; Vicki Ray, William Winant, Aron Kallay & Tom Peters – Cage: The 10,000 Things; Hélène Grimaud & Sol Gabetta – Duo; New York Polyphony – Times Go By Turns | |
| 2015 | Hilary Hahn & Cory Smythe | In 27 Pieces: The Hilary Hahn Encores | A Far Cry, David Krakauer (conductor) – Dreams & Prayers; Steven Isserlis & Olli Mustonen – Martinu': Cello Sonatas Nos. 1-3; Partch – Partch: Castor & Pollux; New York Polyphony – Sing Thee Nowell | |
| 2016 | Eighth Blackbird | Filament | Tanja Tetzlaff, Christian Tetzlaff & Lars Vogt – Brahms: The Piano Trios; Nadia Shpachenko & Genevieve Feiwen Lee – Flaherty: Airdancing For Toy Piano, Piano & Electronics; Brad Wells & Roomful of Teeth – Render; Takács Quartet & Marc-André Hamelin – Shostakovich: Piano Quintet & String Quartet No. 2 | |
| 2017 | Third Coast Percussion | Steve Reich | ARC Ensemble with Kara Huber – Fitelberg: Chamber Works; Øyvind Gimse, Geir Inge Lotsberg & TrondheimSolistene – Reflections; Spektral Quartet – Serious Business; Lincoln Trio – Trios From our Homelands | |
| 2018 | Patricia Kopatchinskaja & the Saint Paul Chamber Orchestra | Death & the Maiden | Arcangelo – Buxtehude: Trio Sonatas Op. 1; Stile Antico – Divine Theatre - Sacred Motets by Giaches de Wert; Joyce Yang & Augustin Hadelich – Franck, Kurtág, Previn & Schumann; Martha Argerich & Various Artists – Martha Argerich & Friends - Live From Lugano 2016 | |
| 2019 | Laurie Anderson & the Kronos Quartet | Landfall | The Danish String Quartet – Beethoven, Shostakovich & Bach; The Aizuri Quartet – Blueprinting; Leif Ove Andsnes & Marc-André Hamelin – Stravinsky: The Rite of Spring Concerto for Two Pianos; A Far Cry – Visions and Variations | |
| 2020 | Attacca Quartet (ensemble); Antonio Oliart & Caroline Shaw (producers); Antonio Oliart (engineer) | Shaw: Orange | Christopher Rountree & wild Up – Cerrone: The Pieces that Fall to Earth; PUBLIQuartet – Freedom & Faith; Third Coast Percussion – Perpetulum; Hermitage Piano Trio – Rachmaninoff - Hermitage Piano Trio | |
| 2021 | Pacifica Quartet; James Ginsburg (producer); Bill Maylone (engineer/mixer) | Contemporary Voices | Brooklyn Rider – Healing Modes; Ted Hearne (conductor); Steven Bradshaw, Sophia Byrd, Josephine Lee, Isaiah Robinson, Sol Ruiz, Ayanna Woods & the Place Orchestra – Hearne: Place; Devonté Hynes & Third Coast Percussion – Hynes: Fields; Dover Quartet – The Schumann Quartets | |
| 2022 | Yo-Yo Ma & Emanuel Ax | Beethoven: Cello Sonatas - Hope Amid Tears | JACK Quartet – John Luther Adams: Lines Made By Walking; Sandbox Percussion – Akiho: Seven Pillars; Sérgio Assad, Clarice Assad & Third Coast Percussion – Archetypes; Imani Winds – Bruits | |
| 2023 | Attacca Quartet | Shaw: Evergreen | The Dover Quartet – Beethoven: Complete String Quartets, Vol. 2 – The Middle Quartets; Neave Trio – Musical Remembrances; Third Coast Percussion – Perspectives; PUBLIQuartet – What is American | |
| 2024 | Roomful of Teeth | Rough Magic | Anthony McGill & The Pacifica Quartet – American Stories; Yo-Yo Ma, Emanuel Ax & Leonidas Kavakos – Beethoven For Three: Symphony No. 6 "Pastorale" and Op 1. No. 3; Third Coast Percussion – Between Breaths; Catalyst Quartet – Uncovered, Vol. 3: Coleridge-Taylor Perkinson, William Grant Still & George Walker | |
| 2025 | Caroline Shaw & So Percussion | Rectangles and Circumstance | JACK Quartet – J.L. Adams: Waves & Particles; Yo-Yo Ma, Leonidas Kavakos & Emanuel Ax – Beethoven for Three: Symphony No. 4 and Op. 97, 'Archduke'; Beth Willer, Christopher Cerrone & Lorelei Ensemble – Cerrone: Beaufort Scales; Miró Quartet – Home | |
| 2026 | Alan Pierson & Alarm Will Sound | Dennehy: Land of Winter | Neave Trio - La Mer - French Piano Trios; Lili Haydn & Paul Cantelon - Lullabies for the Brokenhearted; Mak Grgić & Mateusz Kowalski - Slavic Sessions; Third Coast Percussion - Standard Stoppages | |
| 2027 | TBA on 7 February 2027 | | Florence Price, Paquito d'Rivera, Ilya Kaler & Rasa Vitauskaite - The Bridgetower Project - Beethoven; Neave Trio - In Her Hands; Alan Pierson & Alarm Will Sound - Kouyoumdjian: Paper Pianos; Joyce Didonato & Time For Three - Puts: Emily - No Prisoner Be; Publiquartet - Rhythm Nation | |
