= Ten Freedom Summers =

Live album and box set by Wadada Leo Smith
- Released: May 8, 2012
- Recorded: November 4–6, 2011
- Venue: Zipper Hall (Los Angeles)
- Genre: Contemporary classical; neoclassical; free jazz; chamber
- Length: 273:48
- Label: Cuneiform
- Producer: Southwest Chamber Music; Wadada Leo Smith

Wadada Leo Smith chronology
Dark Lady of the Sonnets (2011)	Ten Freedom Summers (2012)	Ancestors (2012)

Ten Freedom Summers is a four-disc box set by American trumpeter and composer Wadada Leo Smith. It was released on May 5, 2012, by Cuneiform Records. Smith wrote its compositions intermittently over the course of 34 years, beginning in 1977, before performing them live in November 2011 at the Colburn School's Zipper Hall in Los Angeles. He was accompanied by the nine-piece Southwest Chamber Music ensemble and his own jazz quartet, featuring drummers Pheeroan akLaff and Susie Ibarra, pianist Anthony Davis, and bassist John Lindberg.

A mostly classical work, Ten Freedom Summers comprises 19 pieces that are often fully developed as suites. They abandon conventional themes in favor of abstract expressions of the titles, which reflect the Civil Rights Movement and other interrelated topics. Smith cites the segregation of his native Mississippi and playwright August Wilson's The Pittsburgh Cycle as inspirations behind the work. Ten Freedom Summers received widespread acclaim from critics and was named a finalist for the Pulitzer Prize for Music in 2013.

== Background ==
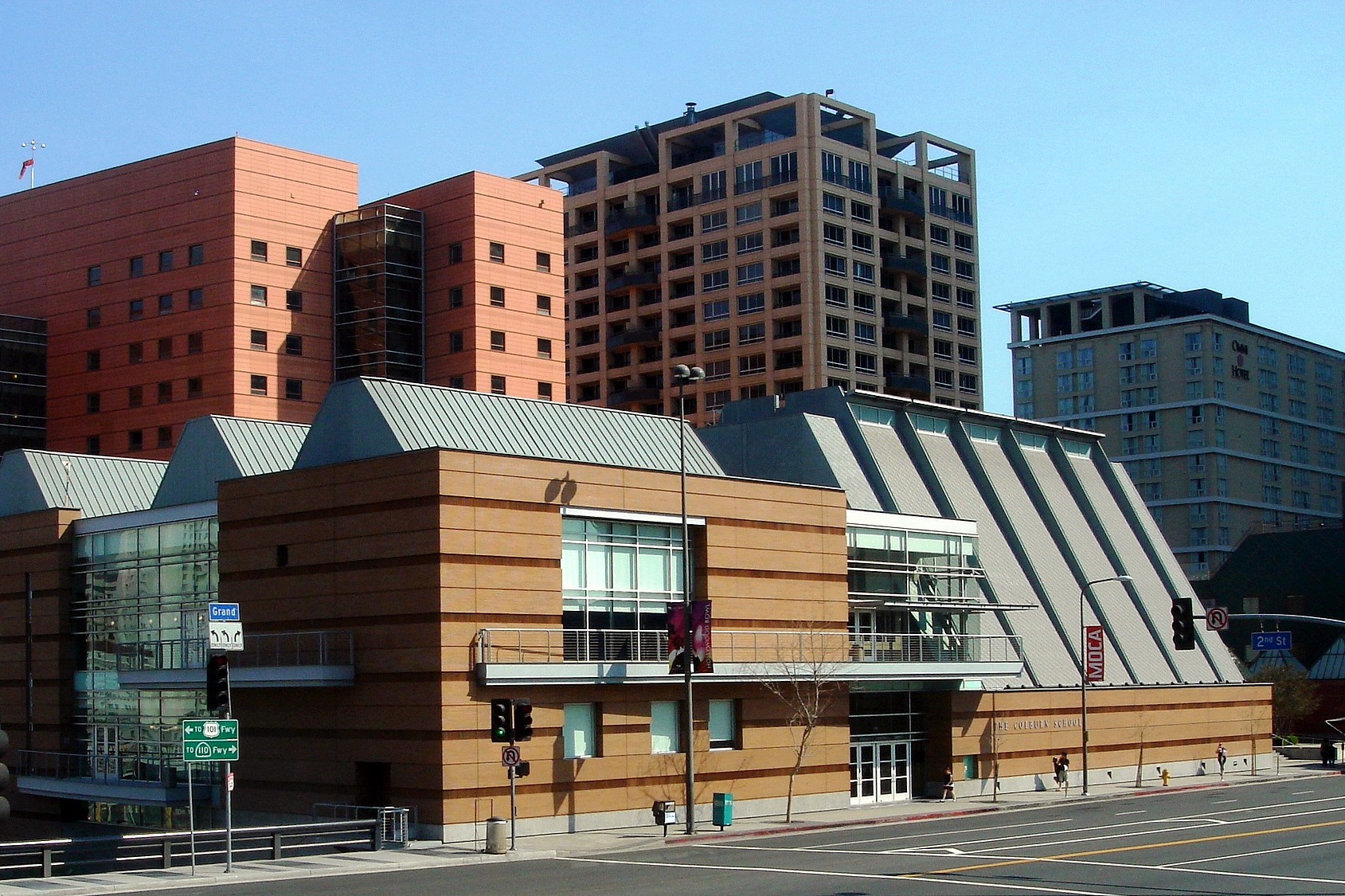
Concert hall of the Colburn School

Smith started Ten Freedom Summers in 1977, when he wrote the piece "Medgar Evers" as an evocation of the eponymous civil rights activist gunned down in Mississippi in 1963. Smith subsequently worked intermittently on the project. He spent 34 years writing it, supported by a series of residencies, grants and commissions, the final one from the Southwest Chamber Music ensemble. He completed the pieces in a flurry of activity between 2009 and 2011. Smith was inspired to assemble the pieces into one group by August Wilson's 10-play series The Pittsburgh Cycle. Smith also drew on his personal experiences living under racial segregation in the United States, explaining:

I was born in 1941 and grew up in segregated Mississippi and experienced the conditions which made it imperative for an activist movement for equality. I saw that stuff happening. Those are the moments that triggered this. It was in that same environment that I had my first dreams of becoming a composer and performer.

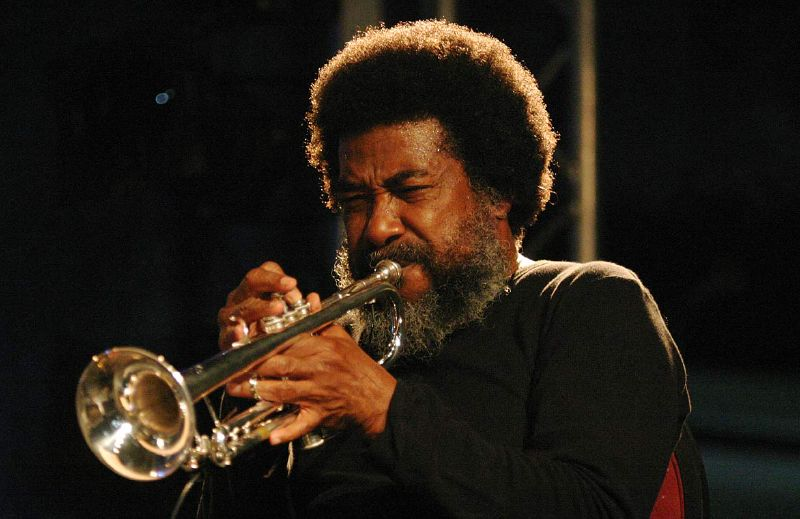
Smith in 2008

Ten Freedom Summers was recorded at Zipper Hall in Los Angeles, where Smith performed live for three nights from November 4 to November 6, 2011. He played 19 pieces, accompanied by either his Golden Quartet, the nine-piece Southwest Chamber Music ensemble conducted by Jeff von der Schmidt, or both. Smith's quartet featured drummers Pheeroan akLaff and Susie Ibarra, pianist Anthony Davis, and bassist John Lindberg.

== Composition and performance ==
Ten Freedom Summers comprises four discs for a total of four-and-a-half hours of music. Most of its 19 pieces are fully developed suites, with three spanning over 20 minutes. According to Smith, there are no recurring motifs throughout. Instead of using his own "Ankhrasmation" method of graphic notation, Smith wrote Ten Freedom Summers with a traditionally notated score. His Golden Quartet played music rooted in blues and jazz idioms, and the Southwest Chamber Music ensemble played violin, viola, cello, harp, concert bass, glockenspiel, bass clarinet, flute, tympani, marimba, gongs, and other miscellaneous percussion. In the opinion of All About Jazz writer Mark Redlefsen, Smith's use of echo-laden, atmospheric sounds in his previous work culminated on Ten Freedom Summers, whose somber mood reflects the pieces' titles.

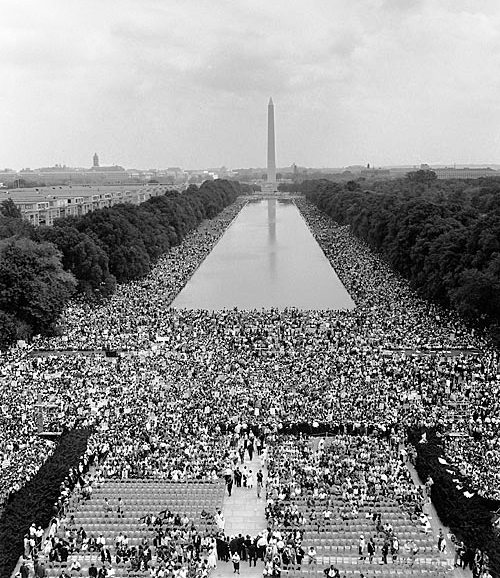
The 1963 March on Washington for Jobs and Freedom, reproduced on the album cover and one of many historical events to have inspired the music

The compositions are organized in three principal sections—"Defining Moments in America", "What Is Democracy?", and "Freedom Summers". Each section's pieces are meant to represent significant figures associated with the Civil Rights Movement during 1954 to 1964 and concepts relevant to the formation of institutions that evolved from human interaction, including government, media, and megacorporations. Jeff Dayton-Johnson from All About Jazz said although its movements "variously address Malcolm X, Dr. Martin Luther King Jr., Brown vs. Board of Education, Medgar Evers [and] the Little Rock Nine", the "thematic concerns nevertheless extend ... both backwards (to the 1857 Dred Scott case) and forward (to 9/11), and to a series of cross-cutting concerns (e.g., democracy, the freedom of the press and the black church)."

"Emmett Till: Defiant, Fearless"
In the piece, the strings, harp, and quartet enter gradually and swirl into cacophony in a fuguelike section.

According to Josh Langhoff from PopMatters, the box set's pieces "transform their subjects into musical invention and moods; they’re not literal or programmatic." Langhoff finds them similar to contemporary classical pieces in how they "make their points through abstraction." Daniel Spicer of BBC Music characterized the music as "a mixture of austere contemporary classical composition performed by the LA-based Southwest Chamber Music ensemble, and turbulent free jazz improvised by the Golden Quartet". Ben Ratliff, however, argued that it may not be free jazz because of the music's seemingly composed nature. In the opinion of jazz critic John Fordham, the presence of either Smith's jazz quartet or the classical ensemble led him to abandon typical themes and continuous pulses in favor of contemporary classical and free jazz idioms. Bob Rusch believed the performances are not inspired by contemporary Civil Rights Movement music by artists such as Paul Robeson, Pete Seeger, Mahalia Jackson, or Aretha Franklin, because Smith's Golden Quintet exhibit an astral, chamber sound.

== Critical reception ==
Professional ratings
Aggregate scores
Source	Rating
Metacritic	99/100
Review scores
Source	Rating
All About Jazz	5/5 stars
AllMusic	5/5 stars
The Guardian	4/5 stars
The Irish Times	5/5 stars
musicOMH	5/5 stars
PopMatters	10/10
Tom Hull – on the Web	B+

Ten Freedom Summers was met with widespread critical acclaim. At Metacritic, which assigns a normalized rating out of 100 to reviews from professional publications, the album received a weighted average score of 99, based on 8 reviews. It is the highest-scoring album on the website.

Reviewing for The Guardian in August 2012, Fordham called the record "a landmark in jazz's rich canon", while Bill Shoemaker of The Wire regarded it as "a monumental evocation of America's civil rights movement". Glen Hall from Exclaim! wrote that "Smith's music resonates with the suffering and the dreams of a better life that embodied the decade of 1954 to 1964 that is the subject of this powerful compendium of compositions." AllMusic's Thom Jurek viewed the box set as Smith's best work, writing that it "belongs in jazz's canonical lexicon with Duke Ellington's Black, Brown & Beige and Max Roach's Freedom Now Suite." Phil Johnson from The Independent found the music very gratifying, saying it sounds like if Miles Davis had recorded Ligeti compositions during the 1950s. Langhoff wrote in PopMatters that the set is "about sound: the tangible, physically beautiful sounds of Smith's imperative trumpet and of different instruments in combination, testing their own limits." In conclusion, the reviewer said "Smith writes one of America's defining events in sound, and the story is all of ours."

In Cadence Magazine, Rusch was less enthusiastic about the box set, believing it would have benefitted from being released as four separate albums; listening to the entire record for him was "exhausting, but also involving and inspiring". Jazz critic Tom Hull said, "With no libretto to make connections [to the titles] obvious, the music can be abstracted from the intents, leaving you with 273 minutes of often overwrought and sometimes tedious neoclassicism, all the more so when played by Jeff von der Schmidt's Southwest Chamber Music" over the course of the first disc. However, he added that Smith's ensemble on the second disc is "more compact", with the trumpeter able to play distinctively and interact with Davis' piano, and advised listeners to "focus there, and keep the faith."

At the end of 2012, Ten Freedom Summers was ranked as one of the year's best jazz albums in lists published by AllMusic, All About Jazz, JazzTimes, and the Chicago Reader. Bret Saunders from The Denver Post named it 2012's best jazz record, and it was ranked #22 for Jazz Album of the Year in the 77th Annual DownBeat Readers Poll, as well as being included in the magazine's "Best CDs of 2012" feature. It was also ranked number 31 in The Wire's list of 2012's best albums. Ten Freedom Summers was one of three finalists for the 2013 Pulitzer Prize for Music, along with Aaron Jay Kernis's classical composition "Pieces of Winter Sky" and "Partita for 8 Voices" by Caroline Shaw, who ultimately won the award.

== Track listing ==
All music is composed by Wadada Leo Smith.

Disc one
No.	Title	Length
1.	"Dred Scott: 1857"	11:48
2.	"Malik Al Shabazz and the People of the Shahada"	5:15
3.	"Emmett Till: Defiant, Fearless"	18:02
4.	"Thurgood Marshall and Brown vs. Board of Education: A Dream of Equal Education, 1954"	15:05
5.	"John F. Kennedy's New Frontier and the Space Age, 1960"	22:08
Total length:		72:18

Disc two
No.	Title	Length
1.	"Rosa Parks and the Montgomery Bus Boycott, 381 Days"	12:43
2.	"Black Church"	16:35
3.	"Freedom Summer: Voter Registration, Acts of Compassion and Empowerment, 1964"	12:34
4.	"Lyndon B. Johnson's Great Society and the Civil Rights Act of 1964"	24:12
Total length:		66:04

Disc three
No.	Title	Length
1.	"Freedom Riders Ride"	16:40
2.	"Medgar Evers: A Love-Voice of a Thousand Years' Journey for Liberty and Justice"	10:07
3.	"D.C. Wall: A War Memorial for All Times"	12:17
4.	"Buzzsaw: The Myth of a Free Press"	15:03
5.	"Little Rock Nine: A Force for Desegregation in Education, 1957"	13:49
Total length:		67:56

Disc four
No.	Title	Length
1.	"America, Parts 1, 2 & 3"	14:11
2.	"September 11th, 2001: A Memorial"	9:39
3.	"Fannie Lou Hamer and the Mississippi Freedom Democratic Party, 1964"	8:36
4.	"Democracy"	14:30
5.	"Martin Luther King, Jr.: Memphis, the Prophecy"	20:34
Total length:		67:30

== Personnel ==
Credits are adapted from the album's liner notes.

- Pheeroan akLaff – drums
- Alison Bjorkedal – harp
- Dorothy Cotton – liner notes
- Dorothy Cowfield – photography
- Anthony Davis – piano
- Bill Ellsworth – package design
- Jeff Evans – editing, mixing engineer
- Jim Foschia – clarinet
- Lorenz Gamma – violin
- Golden Quartet – ensemble, main personnel
- Golden Quintet – ensemble, main personnel
- Steve Gunther – photography
- Lyn Horton – drawing
- Susie Ibarra – drums
- Michael Jackson – photography
- Peter Jacobson – cello
- Larry Kaplan – flute
- Jan Karlin – viola
- Warren K. Leffler – photography
- John Lindberg – bass
- Gene Paul – mastering engineer
- Tom Peters – bass
- Jamie Polaski – mastering assistant
- Jeff von der Schmidt – conductor
- Wadada Leo Smith – composer, executive producer, primary artist, producer, trumpet
- Matthew Snyder – engineer
- Southwest Chamber Music – ensemble, executive producer, producer
- Matthew Sumera – liner notes
- Lynn Vartan – percussion
- Shalini Vijayan – violin

== Release history ==
Region	Date	Label	Format
Canada	May 8, 2012	Cuneiform	CD
Japan	May 20, 2012	Cuneiform	CD
United Kingdom	May 21, 2012	Cuneiform	CD
United Kingdom	May 22, 2012	Cuneiform	Digital download
United States	May 22, 2012	Cuneiform	CD; digital download
