= Harmonie Ensemble/New York =

Harmonie Ensemble/New York is a musical organization based in New York City that performs and records an eclectic repertoire ranging from classical to jazz. Founded in 1979 by its conductor, Steven Richman, HE/NY has performed orchestra, chamber orchestra, symphonic jazz, big band, chamber, and wind ensemble works in virtually all of New York's concert halls, including Carnegie Hall, Alice Tully Hall at Lincoln Center, Merkin Concert Hall, and St. Peter's ("The Jazz Church"), and throughout the United States under Columbia Artists Management. It also appears on radio and television. HE/NY has received numerous awards, including a GRAMMY Award nomination, the Classical Recording Foundation Award in Carnegie Hall, Lincoln Center Community Arts Project, and the WQXR Action for the Arts Award.

HE/NY has given the U.S., New York, and world premieres of works by Handel, Stravinsky, Shostakovich, Nino Rota, Brahms, Copland, Mussorgsky, Grofé, and Krommer, the premiere of Dvořák's Octet-Serenade, and the first performances in more than 50 years of Gershwin’s original symphonic orchestrations (researched by Richman) at Lincoln Center for the Performing Arts. One of the latter events drew the largest audience in the history of Lincoln Center (10,000 people) in Damrosch Park. HE/NY also presented the first fireworks concert at Lincoln Center, marking Handel's 300th Birthday, and a Leonard Bernstein 70th Birthday Concert, which received a letter of commendation from New York City Mayor Ed Koch.

== Dvořák Day Concerts ==
Beginning in 1994, under Richman, the ensemble presented a series of benefit concerts to place a statue of Czech composer Antonín Dvořák in Stuyvesant Square Park, New York City, across the street from where Dvořák lived from 1892-95 while director of the National Conservatory of Music. Among the guest artists were the Guarneri String Quartet, bass-baritone William Warfield, and Czech soprano Eva Urbanová. It later presented the annual Dvořák Day Concerts featuring both American and Czech artists. On September 13, 1997, the first concert was in conjunction with the dedication of the Dvořák Statue in Stuyvesant Square Park. Featured was a performance of Symphony No. 9, “From the new world,” in St. George's Church, across the park from where it was composed at 327 E. 17th Street. The event also featured violinist Josef Suk, Dvořák's great-grandson, performing Dvořák's Sonatina for Violin and Piano, also composed in the 17th St. house. Among the many honored guests were members of the Dvořák family, the Lord Mayor of Prague, and filmmaker Milos Forman.

== Aaron Copland 80th Birthday Concert ==
Both Steven Richman and Dean of American composers Aaron Copland conducted Harmonie Ensemble/New York at the Copland 80th Birthday Concert on Nov. 22, 1980, at New York's Symphony Space. The program was broadcast live on National Public Radio. Copland led the original 13-instrument version of Appalachian Spring and Richman conducted Copland's Music for the Theatre. A film, Copland at 80: A Self-Portrait, including the composer conducting Harmonie Ensemble/New York, has been broadcast internationally and released on video worldwide. Maestro Leonard Bernstein spoke, and was among the many prominent musical figures in attendance.

== Musical Anniversary Celebration Concerts ==
Among the ensemble's birthday celebration concerts have been events devoted to Gershwin, Dvořák, Stravinsky, Toscanini, Handel, Bernstein, Morton Gould, Duke Ellington, Harry Burleigh (Dvořák's assistant), William Walton, Nino Rota, Claude Thornhill, Benny Goodman, Henry Mancini, and Gershwin's associate, Kay Swift.

== Recordings ==
The ensemble's 14 CDs under Richman range from a Toscanini 150th Anniversary Tribute to Gershwin original orchestrations, works by Dvořák, Copland (featured in the Ken Burns PBS documentary The National Parks), and Stravinsky (for which it received a GRAMMY Award nomination in 2002), as well as Henry Mancini’s Music From Peter Gunn, (featured on National Public Radio's "All Things Considered"), Duke Ellington/Billy Strayhorn jazz band version of the Nutcracker Suite (paired with Tchaikovsky's original Nutcracker Suite), and the Miles Davis/Gil Evans Sketches of Spain with trumpet soloist Lew Soloff. Among its recording premieres are works by Dvořák, Stravinsky, Gershwin, Grofé, Copland, and Krommer. The CDs have been issued worldwide on the Harmonia Mundi [PIAS], Bridge Records, Koch, Sheffield Lab, and Music & Arts labels.

== Discography (Harmonie Ensemble/New York and Dvořák Festival Orchestra) ==
- Toscanini 150th Anniversary Tribute: Verdi: Aida Overture, Bizet/Toscanini: Carmen Suite, Waldteufel/Toscanini: Skaters Waltz, Tchaikovsky: Nutcracker Suite, Rossini: William Tell Overture (Bridge Records)
- Gershwin: Concerto in F, An American in Paris; 2 recording premieres: Three Preludes (arr. Bargy), Overture to Of Thee I Sing (radio version), with Lincoln Mayorga (piano) (Harmonia Mundi [PIAS])
- Mancini: Music for Peter Gunn (Harmonia Mundi [PIAS])
- Tchaikovsky and Ellington/Strayhorn: Nutcracker Suites: Classical and Jazz (Harmonia Mundi [PIAS])
- Gershwin by Grofé: “I Got Rhythm” Variations (original Gershwin orchestration), Rhapsody in Blue (original Paul Whiteman Orchestra Jazz Band version), Grofé arr. of “Yankee Doodle Blues” (2 versions: one recorded digitally; the second newly recorded on a wax cylinder on a 1909 Edison Fireside Phonograph), “That Certain Feeling,” “Somebody Loves Me,” “Sweet and Low-down,” “I'll Build a Stairway to Paradise,” “The Man I Love,” “Fascinating Rhythm,” “Summertime,” Lincoln Mayorga (piano), Al Gallodoro (clarinet, alto sax, bass clarinet) (Harmonia Mundi [PIAS])
- Gil Evans/Miles Davis: Sketches of Spain, with Lew Soloff (trumpet) (Sheffield Lab)
- Symphonic Jazz: Grofé and Gershwin: Grofe: (original Whiteman Orchestra versions): Grand Canyon Suite, Mississippi Suite; Grofé: Gallodoro's Serenade, Gershwin (arr. Grofe): Second Rhapsody, with Lincoln Mayorga (piano), Al Gallodoro, (alto sax) (Bridge Records)
- Copland: Appalachian Spring Suite (original version), Music for the Theatre, 2 Ballads for Violin and Piano, Elegies for Violin and Viola, El Salón México, arranged for solo piano by Arturo Toscanini, with Eugene Drucker (violin), Lawrence Dutton (viola), Diane Walsh (piano) (Bridge Records)
- Stravinsky: Histoire du Soldat Suite, Octet for Winds, Pribaoutki, Pastorale, Lied ohne Name; 4 premieres: La Marseillaise, Hommage à Ramuz, Tango, The Mushrooms Go to War, with Mark Peskanov (violin), Lucy Shelton (soprano), Martin Bruns (baritone), Mikhail Svetlov (bass), Doris Stevenson (piano) (Koch International Classics)
- Dvořák Day Concert: “New World” Symphony, Sonatina for Violin and Piano, Fanfare, Humoresque (arr. Kreisler); Harry Burleigh (Dvořák's assistant): arr. “Deep River,” with Josef Suk (violin), Lincoln Mayorga (piano) (Music & Arts)
- Dvořák: Discoveries: Octet-Serenade, Terzetto, Foster/Dvořák: “Old Folks at Home”; “Go Down, Moses” [rec. 1919 Harry Burleigh, Dvořák's assistant], with Arthur Woodley (bass-baritone), Collegiate Chorale (Music & Arts)
- Overtures for Classical Wind Ensemble: Rossini, Beethoven, Mozart, Weber (Music & Arts)
- Dvořák and Friends/Czech Wind Music: Dvořák: Wind Serenade, Slavonic Dance; Krommer Concerto for 2 Horns and Winds, Myslivecek: Octet No.2, with Charles Kavalovski, Scott Brubaker (horns) (Music & Arts)
- Salute to France: Poulenc: Aubade; Ibert: “Paris” Suite, Concerto for Cello and Winds; Milhaud: Little Symphony No. 5 for Winds; Hahn: Le Bal de Beatrice d’Este, with Ralph Votapek (piano), James Kreger (cello) (Music & Arts)
