= William Kraft =

American composer, conductor, teacher, and percussionist (1923–2022)

William Kraft (September 6, 1923 – February 12, 2022) was an American composer, conductor, teacher, timpanist, and percussionist.

== Biography ==
=== Early life and education (1923–1954) ===
Kraft was born in Chicago, Illinois. He was awarded two Anton Seidl Fellowships at Columbia University, graduating with a bachelor's degree cum laude in 1951 and a master's degree in 1954. He studied composition with Jack Beeson and Henry Cowell, orchestration with Henry Brant, percussion with Morris Goldenberg, timpani from Saul Goodman, and conducting with Rudolph Thomas and Fritz Zweig.

While in New York City, Kraft worked as a freelance musician and was an extra percussionist at the Metropolitan Opera. In 1954, Kraft joined the Dallas Symphony. After one season, he accepted a position as percussionist with the Los Angeles Philharmonic.

=== At the Los Angeles Philharmonic (1955–1985) ===
Kraft began as a member of the Los Angeles Philharmonic's percussion section, before being promoted to the orchestra's principal timpanist. From 1968 to 1972, he also served as the orchestra's assistant conductor, under then music director Zubin Mehta. From 1981 to 1985, Kraft was Composer-in-Residence for the orchestra; during that period he founded and directed its New Music Group. Altogether he spent 26 years with the philharmonic.

In 1958, Kraft founded the Los Angeles Percussion Ensemble, a group which made its debut on March 10 with the Monday Evening Concerts. The group performed the world and local premieres of works by Alberto Ginastera, Lou Harrison, Ernst Krenek, Igor Stravinsky, Edgard Varèse, and other composers. He performed in the local premiere of Pierre Boulez's Le marteau sans maître under the composer's direction and played the American premiere of Karlheinz Stockhausen's Zyklus. The latter led to a journalistic debate between Los Angeles Times music critic Albert Goldberg and Kraft, who took exception to the critic's use of the term "noisemakers" in reference to percussion instruments.

He has also composed film soundtracks, including the scores to Psychic Killer (1975), Avalanche (1978), Bill (1981), and Fire and Ice (1983).

=== Later years ===
Kraft served as chairman of the composition department and holder of the Corwin Chair at the University of California, Santa Barbara until he retired in June 2002.

Kraft died on February 12, 2022, at the age of 98.

== Commissions and awards ==
- Kennedy Center Friedheim Awards Second Prize (1984) : Concerto for Timpani and Orchestra
- Kennedy Center Friedheim Awards First Prize (1990) : Veils and Variations for Horns and Orchestra
- Hall of Fame of the Percussive Arts Society (1990)
- American Society of Composers, Authors and Publishers Award

== Compositions ==
In the 1960s and 1970s, most of Kraft's compositions were serial, while in the 1980s he incorporated jazz rhythms and impressionist harmonies. Although percussion works feature prominently in his catalog, in 1996–1998 he concentrated on composing his first opera, Red Azalea. His works have been performed by many major American orchestras as well as those in Europe, Japan, Korea, China, Australia, Israel, and the USSR. Kraft's Contextures: Riots – Decade '60 (1967) has been choreographed and performed by both the Scottish National Ballet and the Minnesota Dance Company. In 1986, United Airlines commissioned a work expressly to accompany a lumetric sculpture by Michael Hayden titled Sky's the Limit, for their pedestrian passageway at Chicago-O'Hare International Airport.

Encounters
Name	Instrumentations		Details
Name	General List	Percussion	Details
Soliloquy	Multi-percussion with tape	Percussion Vibraphone; Bongos; Snare drum Tenor drum Bass drum (with pedal); Tam-tam	Commissioned by and dedicated to Karen Ervin; World premiere by Karen Ervin in 1975; Published by New Music West; Tape Recording by Protone CSPR163 Cassette
Encounter II	Tuba	None	World premiere by Roger Bobo in 1967; Published by Editions BIM
Encounter III	Multi-percussion and trumpet	Percussion: Glockenspiel; Vibraphone; Crotales; Song bells Tuned gongs Temple blocks 5 Cowbells; 3 Triangles / 5 Suspended cymbals Bongos; Snare drum Field drum Tenor drum Bass drum	Commission by Thomas Stevens; Dedicated to Thomas Stevens and Mitchell Peters; World premiere by Malcom McNab (trumpet) and Karen Ervin (percussion) in 1972; Published by New Music West; Tape Recording by Protone CSPR163 Cassette
Encounter IV	Multi-percussion and trombone with tape	Percussion: Crotales; Vibraphone; 4 Timpani; 9 Tuned gongs Timbales / Bongos; Tenor drums 11 Steel bowls 4 Tam-tams Galvanized trash can cover	Commission by Thomas Ervin and Karen Ervin; World premiere by Thomas Ervin (trombone), Karen Ervin (percussion) and tape collage by William Malloch on 1973; Published by New Music West
In the Morning of the Winter Sea	Multi-percussion and cello	Percussion: Crotales; Bongos; Snare drum Field drum / Tenor drum 4 Tam-tams; Spring coil	Commissioned by the Ford Foundation; World premiere by Nathaniel Rosen (cello) and William Kraft (percussion) in 1976; Published by New Music West
Concertino for Roto Toms and Percussion Quartet	Multi-percussion with percussion quartet	Percussion Solo 7 Rototoms (6, 8, 10, 12, 14, 16 and 18 inches) Triangle; 4 Cymbals 6 Crotales (G, C♯, F, D♯, E and F♯) Player 1 Vibraphone; 4 Tam-tams; Bass drum Wind chimes (metal); Spring coil Player 2 Vibraphone; Tubular bells Player 3 Glockenspiel; Vibraphone Player 4 Vibraphone	Commissioned by Remo; Dedicated to Jennifer Kraft (William Kraft's daughter); World premiere by Temple University Percussion Ensemble on 10 March 1976; Published by New Music West
Blessed Are the Peacemakers	Multi-percussion duet	Percussion: Player 1 Vibraphone; Marimba; Crotales; 5 Timpani; 4 Suspended cymbals Bongos / Player 2 Vibraphone; Crotales; Tubular bells Timpano; 2 Brake drums 4 Tom toms Bongos; Snare drum Field drum Tenor drum Bass drum	Commission by Steve Grimo and Pat Hollenbeck; Dedicated to Liz, David, Marc, Pat, Marsha, Rick, Nancy, Don, Sylvia and Carl; World premiere by Steve Grimo and Pat Hollenbeck in 1978; Published by New Music West
The Latimer Encounter	Multi-percussion solo	Percussion: Glockenspiel; Vibraphone; Marimba; Chimes / 3 Temple blocks 2 Woodblocks; 2 Tam-tams	Commissioned by members and alumni of Wisconsin Youth Symphony; World premiere by Jim Latimer in 1978; Published by New Music West
Encounters IX	Alto saxophone and multi-percussion	Percussion: Vibraphone; Bongos; 2 Snare drums Field drum Tenor drum / Bass drum Tam-tam; 3 Suspended cymbals Japanese prayer bowls (optional)	Commissioned by Baylor University; World premiere by David Hastings (saxophone) and Larry Vanlandingham (percussion) in 1982; Published by New Music West
Duologue for Violin and Marimba	Violin and marimba	None	Commission by Marimolin; World premiere by Sharan Leventhal (violin) and Nancy Zeltsman (marimba) in 1992; Published by New Music West
The Demise of Suriyodhaya	Multi-percussion and English horn	Percussion: Vibraphone; Marimba; Crotales; Bongos; 2 Snare drums / Field drum Tenor drum Bass drum Mark tree Wind chimes	Commission by Carolyn Hove and Raynor Carroll; Dedicated to Lou Harrison and Toru Takemitsu; World premiered by Carolyn Hove (English horn) and Raynor Carroll (percussion) on 1 March 1999; Published by Theodore Pressor Company
The Gabrielic Foray	Multi-percussion and harp	Percussion: Glockenspiel; Vibraphone; Almglocken; Bongos; 2 Snare drums / Field drum Tenor drum Bass drum Tam-tam; Sizzle cymbal	World premiered by David Herbert (percussion) and Alison Bjurkedal (harp) on 12 August 2003; Published by Theodore Pressor Company
Concertino for Percussion and Woodwind Quintet	Multi-percussion and woodwind quintet	Percussion: Vibraphone; Crotales; Bongos; 2 Snare drums Field drum Tenor drum / Bass drum Tam-tam; 4 Suspended cymbals Hi-hat; Vibraslap; Maracas	World premiere by Kenneth McGrath (percussion) and Southwest Chamber Music on 17 March 2008; Published by Theodore Pressor Company
Concerto a Tre	Violin, piano, and percussion	Percussion: Vibraphone; Bongos; Snare drum Field drum / Tenor drum Bass drum Tam-tam; Suspended cymbal	World premiered by Martha's Vineyard Chamber Music Society on 8 August 2005; Published by Theodore Pressor Company
Encounter XV	Multi-percussion and amplified guitar	Percussion: Vibraphone; Marimba; Crotales; Bongos; Snare drum Field drum Tenor drum Bass drum 7 Tuned Asian gongs / 12 Small tuned Asian gongs Tam-tams; Suspended cymbals Cowbells; 2 Temple bowls	Commissioned by the Fromm Foundation for Southwest Chamber Music; World premiered by Lynn Vartan (percussion) and John Schneider (guitar) on 6 October 2008; Published by Theodore Pressor Company

Large Ensemble Works
Title	Instrumentation			Details
Title	Solo	Ensemble	Percussion	Details
Concerto for Four Percussionists and Symphonic Wind Ensemble	Multi-percussion	Ensemble 4 Flutes (3rd doubling piccolo; 4th doubling piccolo and alto flute) 4 Oboes (4th doubling English horn) 4 Clarinet in B♭ (4th doubling bass clarinet in B♭) 4 Bassoon (4th doubling contrabassoon) 4 Horns in F 4 Trumpets in C 4 Trombones; Tuba Piano (doubling celesta) Harp	Percussion Player 1 Timpani; Wood drums Tambourine Player 2; 5 Drums; Crotales; Glockenspiel; Tubular bells Player 3 Vibraphone; Xylophone; Metals; Bass drum Player 4 Glockenspiel; Xylophone; Snare drum Triangle; Song bells	Dedicated to Edgard Varèse; World premiere: Los Angeles Philharmonic Orchestra on 10 March 1966
Configurations; Concerto for Four Percussion Soloists and Jazz Orchestra	Multi-percussion	Ensemble Flute; Clarinet; Alto saxophone 2 Horns; 3 Trumpets; 3 Trombones; Tuba; Piano; Guitar; Double bass	Percussion Player 1 Timpani; Marimba; Xylophone; Crotales; Tam-tam Player 2 Crotales; Glockenspiel; Tubular bells Bass drum 3 Wood blocks 2 Temple blocks Player 3 Vibraphone; Bongos; Snare drum Tenor drum Field drum Bass drum Player 4 Tubular bells Crotales; Bass drum Drumset	Commission by Ludwig Drum Company; World premiere by University of Southern California Wind Ensemble on 13 November 1966
Concerto for Timpani and Orchestra	Timpani	Ensemble 2 Flutes (both doubling piccolo) 2 Oboes (both doubling English horn) 2 Clarinets in B♭ 2 Bassoons; 4 Horns in F 3 Trumpets in C 3 Trombone; 3 Percussion Piano (doubling celesta) Harp; Violins; Violas; Cellos; Double bass	Percussion: Player 1 6 Graduated drums 2 Suspended cymbals (high and medium) Glockenspiel; Crotales (E, A) Player 2 Crotales (2 octaves) 6 Temple blocks Crash cymbals Suspended cymbal (medium) Snare drum Field drum Xylophone; Triangle; Tam-tam (shared) / Player 3 Chimes; Crotales (B, E); Bass drum Tam-tam (shared) Suspended cymbal (low) Vibraphone; Lath on leather pad	Commissioned by Indiana Percussion Project; Dedicated to Thomas Akins; World premiere by Thomas Akins (soloist) and Indianapolis Symphony Orchestra
Concerto for Percussion and Chamber Ensemble	Multi-percussion	Ensemble Flute (doubling piccolo) Clarinet in A (doubling bass clarinet in B♭) Violin; Cello	Percussion: Bongos; Cowbells Suspended cymbal (low) Tam-tam; 2 Snare drums Field drum / Tenor drum Bass drum (pedal) 2 Automobile spring coils Vibraphone; Marimba	World premiere by Dean Anderson (soloist) and Boston Musica Viva on 17 September 1993
Concerto No. 2 for Timpani and Orchestra; The Grand Encounter	Timpani (15 Timpani are required)	Ensemble 3 Flutes (3rd doubling piccolo and alto flute) 3 Oboes (3rd doubling English horn) 3 Clarinet in B♭ (3rd doubling bass clarinet in B♭) 3 Bassoon (3rd doubling contrabassoon) 3 Horns in F 3 Trumpets in C 3 Trombones; Tuba; 4 Percussion Piano (doubling celesta) Harp; Violins; Violas; Cellos; Double bass	Percussion Player 1 Vibraphone; Crotales; Flexatone; Tam-tam; Brake Drum Player 2 Glockenspiel; 7 Almglocken; Bongos; 2 Snare drums Field drum Tenor drum Bass drum Crash cymbals Suspended cymbal Tam-tam; Lath on Leather Player 3 Glockenspiel; Marimba; 3 Suspended cymbals Triangle Sleigh bells (high) Vibraslap; Lath on Leather; Player 4 Chimes; Tuned gongs 7 Nipple gongs Sleigh bells (low) Tam-tam Suspended cymbal (low)	Commissioned by Michael Tilson Thomas (music director of San Francisco Symphony Orchestra); World premiere by David Herbert (soloist) and San Francisco Symphony Orchestra on 9 June 2005

== Recordings ==
Compact discs completely devoted to Kraft's music can be found on Harmonia Mundi, CRI, Cambria, Crystal, Albany, and Nonesuch labels. Other works can be found on GM, Crystal, London Decca, Townhall, EMI, and Neuma. Recent works include Brazen, commissioned by the San Francisco Symphony Orchestra; Quintessence Revisited and Concerto for Four Percussion Soloists and Symphonic Wind Ensemble, premiered and recorded by the New England Conservatory Wind Ensemble, Frank Battisti conducting. His Encounter solo series has been recorded multiple times on all appropriate instruments. On Encounters, he worked with guitarist John Schneider. Encounters II showcases unique techniques for tuba such as multiphonics double pedal range. In 2010, the Los Angeles Philharmonic released a recording on DG Concerts of the Timpani Concerto No. 1 featuring Joseph Pereira as soloist with John Adams conducting.

== Discography ==
- Encounters, (Cambria, 2009), Latin Grammy nomination for Best Classical Album
- Encounters II, (Cambria)
