= Philipp Nedel =

German music engineer and record producer

- Occupations: Music engineer, Record producer
- Notable work: After Mozart (2001), Stravinsky: Apollo, Concerto In D (2007)

Philipp Nedel is a German music engineer and record producer of classical music. Nedel has won two Grammy Awards in the category of Best Small Ensemble Performance (2001 for After Mozart - Raskatov, Silvestrov & Schnittke, and 2007 for Stravinsky: Apollo, Concerto In D; Prokofiev.
