= Jan Karlin =

American violist and arts administrator

Jan Karlin (born 1954) is an American violist, author, arts administrator and record producer, who has won two Grammy Awards. She is the Founding Executive Director of Southwest Chamber Music and has administered many national and international tours, festivals, cultural exchanges and educational programs. Karlin is the author of What's Next? Creativity in the Age of Entertainment, which received a 2020 Book Excellence Award and 2019 Readers’ Favorite International Book Award.

== Career highlights ==
Jan Karlin is the Founding Executive Director of the LA International New Music Festival (2012-), the Summer Festival at The Huntington (1993-2013), and Southwest Chamber Music (1987-). Her book, "What's Next? Creativity in the Age of Entertainment," won a 2020 Book Excellence Award and 2019 Reader's Favorite Award. She has been recognized as an outstanding Executive Director in California by the James Irvine Foundation. Karlin produced the largest cultural exchange in the history of the U.S. and Vietnam, the 2010 Ascending Dragon Music Festival and Cultural Exchange, sponsored by the U.S. State Department. During the Exchange, she presented arts administration workshops at the Vietnam National Academy of Music, the U.S. Embassy in Hanoi and the U.S. Consulate in Ho Chi Minh City. The exchange drew international media coverage, including the Vietnam News and TV, CNN International, the LA Times, Harvard Business Review, and The Wall St. Journal. She was appointed Artistic Advisor to the Vietnam National Academy of Music and the Hanoi New Music Ensemble following the exchange. Karlin produced other tours for Southwest including the first American ensemble appearance at the Arnold Schönberg Center in Vienna, Austria, as well as appearances at the Library of Congress in Washington, D.C., and New York’s Cooper Union. Other ensemble tours produced by Karlin have included an NEA/LA Cultural Affairs sponsored appearance at Mexico’s 2009 Guadalajara FIL Festival, five concerts at UNAM in Mexico City in 2006, a concert for the 2006 World Culture Expo at the Temples of Angkor in Cambodia, as well as concerts at the Royal University of Fine Arts in Phnom Penh and the Hanoi Opera House, Vietnam. In southern California she produced three years of 26-week statewide radio broadcasts for Southwest Chamber Music and oversaw development and marketing with eight other organizations for the Radical Past and Universe Festivals. Karlin developed and administers educational programs in Los Angeles County including a Mentorship Program for junior and senior high school students, Music Unwrapped free community concerts, and Project Muse in-school concerts.

As a violist, she has performed worldwide in the U. S., Europe, Mexico, and Asia, as a member of the Wiener Akademie in Vienna and Southwest Chamber Music. Karlin performed three cycles of the complete Beethoven String Quartets with the Southwest String Quartet. She performed on Southwest Chamber Music’s Complete Chamber Works of Carlos Chávez, Volumes 1 and 2, which received 2003 and 2004 Grammy Awards. Her recordings are available on Novalis, ORFEO (Munich), and Cambria Master Recordings. Karlin won two Grammy Awards in 2003 and 2004 as the producer for the "Complete Chamber Music of Carlos Chavez, Volumes 1 and 2", received seven Grammy Award nominations, and two additional Latin Grammy Award nominations as producer in 2011 and 2013.

== Biography ==
Karlin earned a Bachelor of Arts degree cum laude with a double major in drama and music from Tufts University. As a viola student and graduate assistant of violist Walter Trampler, she received a Master of Music degree from Boston University. Karlin also studied chamber music with Eugene Lehner and attended the Music Academy of the West. While a fellow at the Tanglewood Music Center, she performed under conductors including Seiji Ozawa, Gunther Schuller, Oliver Knussen and Leonard Bernstein. In Los Angeles, she taught at Pomona College at Claremont University and was a member of the Long Beach and Pacific Symphony Orchestras; in Boston,. Karlin performed with the Boston Pops, the Opera Company of Boston under Sarah Caldwell, and was a founding member of the Pro Arte Chamber Orchestra.

== Honors ==
- Appointment by Vietnam Ministry of Culture as Artistic Advisor to the Hanoi New Music Ensemble and the Hanoi Philharmonic Orchestra 2015
- Latin Grammy Award nomination as producer of "Aroma Foliado of Gabriela Ortiz" in 2013
- Latin Grammy Award nomination as producer of "Encounters of William Kraft" in 2011
- James Irvine Foundation Fund for Leadership Advancement, Executive Director Award in 2009
- Grammy Awards as producer of "Complete Chamber Music of Carlos Chavez, Volumes 1 and 2" in 2003 and 2004
- Fellowships to Tanglewood Music Center in 1978 and 1979
