= Zipper Hall =

Coordinates: 34.0539°N 118.2499°W

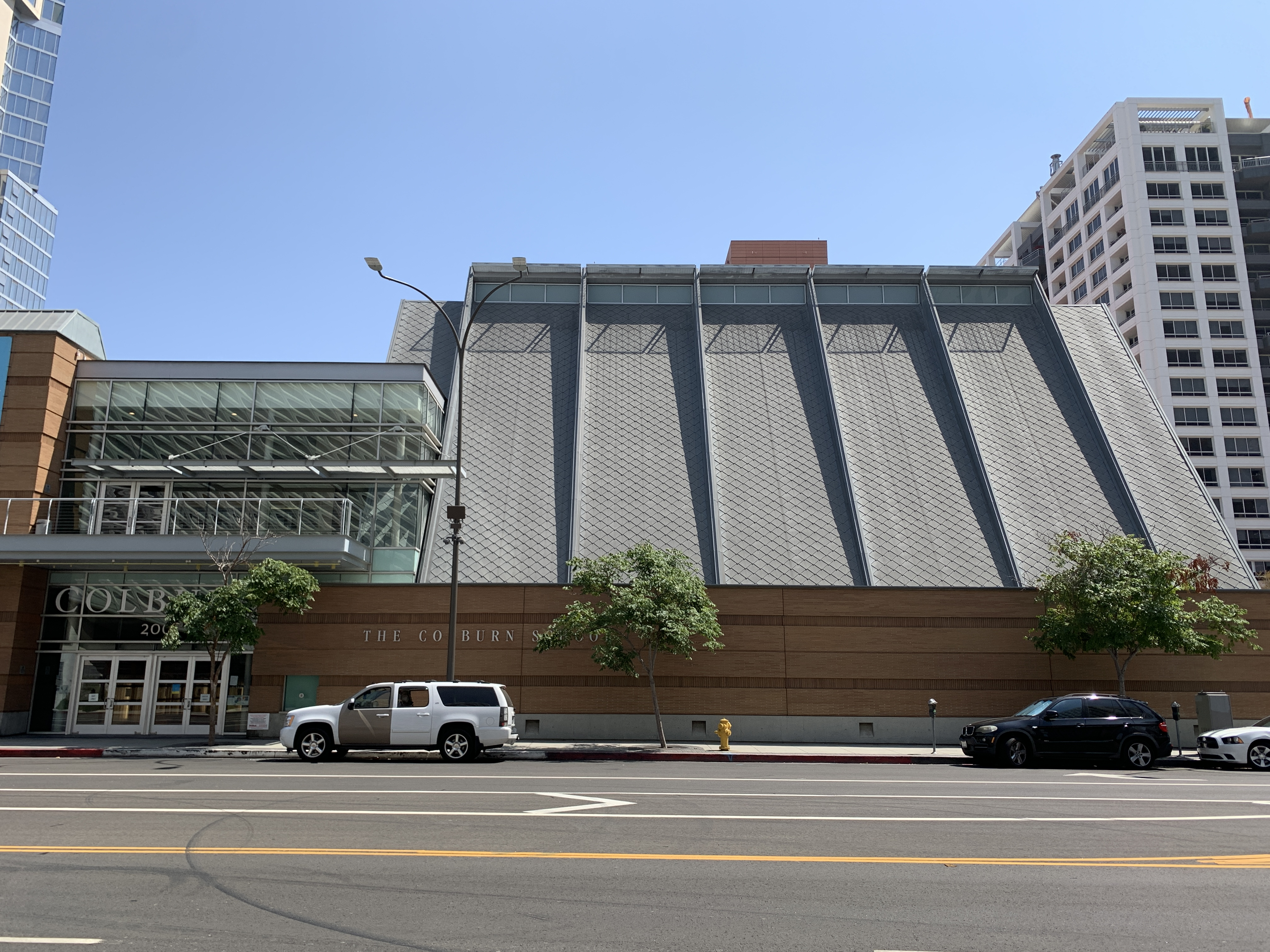
Zipper Hall

Herbert Zipper Concert Hall is a 415-seat music venue located on the campus of the Colburn School in Los Angeles, California, United States. In addition to serving as a performance space for the school, it also is home to Monday Evening Concerts, Southwest Chamber Music, Piano Spheres, VOX Femina Los Angeles, and Musica Angelica. The Los Angeles Chamber Orchestra performs part of its season there. It also regularly hosts many other distinguished performers, and has served as a venue for the Los Angeles Philharmonic's Chamber Music Society and "Green Umbrella" New Music Group series.

It is named after Herbert Zipper, a composer, conductor, and advocate for music education for children, who contributed to the development of the Colburn School.
