= Genevieve Lee =

American pianist

Genevieve Feiwen Lee is an American pianist and musicologist. She is the Everett S. Olive Professor of Music at Pomona College in Claremont, California.

== Early life and education ==
Lee attended the Peabody Conservatory of Music and École Normale de Musique de Paris before completing her doctorate in musical arts at Yale University.

== Career ==
Lee began teaching at Pomona in 1994. She plays the piano, harpsichord, toy piano, keyboard, and electronic instruments.

== Recognition ==
Lee received a Grammy nomination in 2016 in the Best Chamber Music/Small Ensemble Performance category alongside Nadia Shpachenko for Flaherty: Airdancing For Toy Piano, Piano & Electronics.
