= Occupy the World =

Studio album by Wadada Leo Smith
- Released: June 18, 2013
- Recorded: February 19–21, 2012
- Studio: Studio MI, Finnish Broadcasting Company (YLE), Helsinki, Finland
- Genre: Jazz
- Length: 1:52:50
- Label: TUM Records TUM CD 0372
- Producer: Petri Haussila

Wadada Leo Smith chronology
Ancestors (2012)	Occupy the World (2013)	Sonic Rivers (2014)

Professional ratings
Review scores
Source	Rating
All About Jazz	5/5 stars
AllMusic	4/5 stars
The Buffalo News	3/4 stars
Tom Hull	B+

Occupy the World is a two-disc studio album by American jazz trumpeter Wadada Leo Smith recorded with Finnish orchestra Tumo. The album was recorded in Helsinki and released on June 18, 2013 via Finnish TUM Records label.

== Background ==
This album is a Smith's collaboration with Finland's 21-piece improvising orchestra Tumo and is dedicated to the international Occupy movement with tributes to friends and colleagues.

== Reception ==
A reviewer of Dusty Groove stated "An impressive larger project from Wadada Leo Smith – one that features his full compositions played by the Tumo ensemble of Finland – with a range of sounds, tones, and textures that's simply breathtaking! All the spacious, organic elements of Smith's smaller-group work is still in place – but the larger array of players really takes the approach to the next dimension – reaching territory that Leo and contemporaries would never hit on their own – with a depth of feeling and expression that really warrants the double length of the set. In addition to Smith's own trumpet – which solos on most tracks – the set also features a long bass solo from John Lindberg, plus reeds from Juhani Aaltonen, Fredrik Ljungqvist, and Mikko Innanen – plus harlp from Iro Haarla, guitars from Kalle Kalima and Mikko Iivanainen, and trumpet and electronics from Verneri Pohjola."

Thom Jurek of Allmusic noted "Occupy the World is a demanding listening experience -- we'd expect nothing less from a composer of Smith's mettle -- but its rewards are abundant for both fans of vanguard jazz and modern composition."

== Track listing ==
Disc 1

All tracks are written by Wadada Leo Smith.

No.	Title	Length
1.	"Queen Hatshepsut"	17:12
2.	"The Bell-2"	15:56
3.	"Mount Kilimanjaro (Love and Compassion for John Lindberg)"	20:52

Disc 2

All tracks are written by Wadada Leo Smith.

No.	Title	Length
1.	"Crossing on a Southern Road (A Memorial for Marion Brown)"	25:21
2.	"Occupy the World for Life, Liberty and Justice"	33:29
