= Voices of Change =

American chamber music ensemble

- Origin: Dallas, Texas
- Genres: Classical, Experimental
- Years active: 1974 – present
- Labels: Innova
- Website: http://www.voicesofchange.org

Voices of Change is a professional chamber music ensemble based in Dallas, Texas, United States. Voices of Change performs small ensemble works by 20th- and 21st–century composers.

== History ==
Voices of Change was founded in 1974 by pianist Jo Boatright and clarinetist Ross Powell. During the 41st Annual Grammy Awards, VOC was nominated as a finalist for a Best Small Ensemble Performance (With Or Without Conductor). The CD, Voces Americanas, features works of five living composers of Hispanic descent. Voices of Change has been awarded the annual ASCAP Award for Adventuresome Programming an unprecedented five times and has recorded LPs and CDs on the CRI, Crystal, Innova, Albany, Centaur, and Redwood labels.

The ensemble has hosted more than 87 composers who have come to hear, discuss, and participate in the performance of their pieces. It has presented over 60 world premieres (more than 25 of which were commissioned by the ensemble), performed music by over 300 composers, and recorded 5 CDs. Voices of Change also commissions and records new works and produces an annual modern music competition to introduce the music of new composers.

== Members ==
- Maria Schleuning, Artistic Director
- Virginia Dupuy, Soprano
- Helen Blackburn, Flute
- Paul Garner, Clarinet
- Drew Lang, Percussion
- Maria Schleuning, Violin
- Kari Kettering, cello
- Liudmila Georgievskaya, piano.

Previous Artistic Directors:

- Jo Boatright, Founding Artistic Director
- Shields Collins (Buddy) Bray
- Joe Illick

== Discography ==
- 2003. dancesing in a green bay (Music of David Dzubay)
- 2001. Mythologies (Music of Harold Blumenfeld)
- 2000. Music by Donald Grantham
- 1999. Tango/Frida (Music of Robert Xavier Rodriguez)
- 1998. Voces Americanas (Music of Robert Xavier Rodriguez, Mario Lavista, Roberto Sierra, Mario Davidovsky, Tania León)
- 1991. American Contemporary (Music of William Kraft, Larry Alan Smith, Dan Welcher, Robert Xavier Rodriguez)
