= Ancestors (Wadada Leo Smith album) =

Studio album by Wadada Leo Smith
- Released: 2012
- Recorded: February 6, 2011
- Studio: Master Recording, Espoo
- Genre: Jazz
- Length: 60:19
- Label: TUM Records
- Producer: Petri Haussila

Wadada Leo Smith chronology
Ten Freedom Summers (2012)	Ancestors (2012)	Occupy the World (2013)

Ancestors is a studio album by American jazz trumpeter Wadada Leo Smith, which was released in 2012 on the Finnish TUM label. The album features his first recording with South African drummer Louis Moholo-Moholo, after having explored the trumpet/drums duos on The Blue Mountain's Sun Drummer with Ed Blackwell, Compassion with Adam Rudolph, Wisdom in Time with Günter Sommer and America with Jack DeJohnette.

== Reception ==
Professional ratings
Review scores
Source	Rating
AllMusic	4/5 stars
PopMatters	7/10
Tom Hull	A−

In his review for AllMusic, Thom Jurek states "Ancestors is an intimate, canny dialogue between two great masters whose creative common language is not only expressive, it's edifying." The PopMatters review by John Garratt says "For an album coming from a pair of musicians that played together once in the ‘70s and never recorded themselves together until now, Ancestors is a damn fine work."

== Track listing ==
1. "Moholo-Moholo/Golden Spirit" (Wadada Leo Smith) - 8:55
2. "No Name in the Streets, James Baldwin" (Wadada Leo Smith) - 8:25
3. "Jackson pollock - Action" (Wadada Leo Smith, Louis Moholo-Moholo) - 9:16
4. "Siholaro" (Louis Moholo-Moholo) - 8:02
5. "Ancestors" (Wadada Leo Smith, Louis Moholo-Moholo) - 25:41

== Personnel ==
- Wadada Leo Smith - trumpet, flugelhorn
- Louis Moholo-Moholo - drums
