= Steven Richman =

American conductor and writer (born 1946)

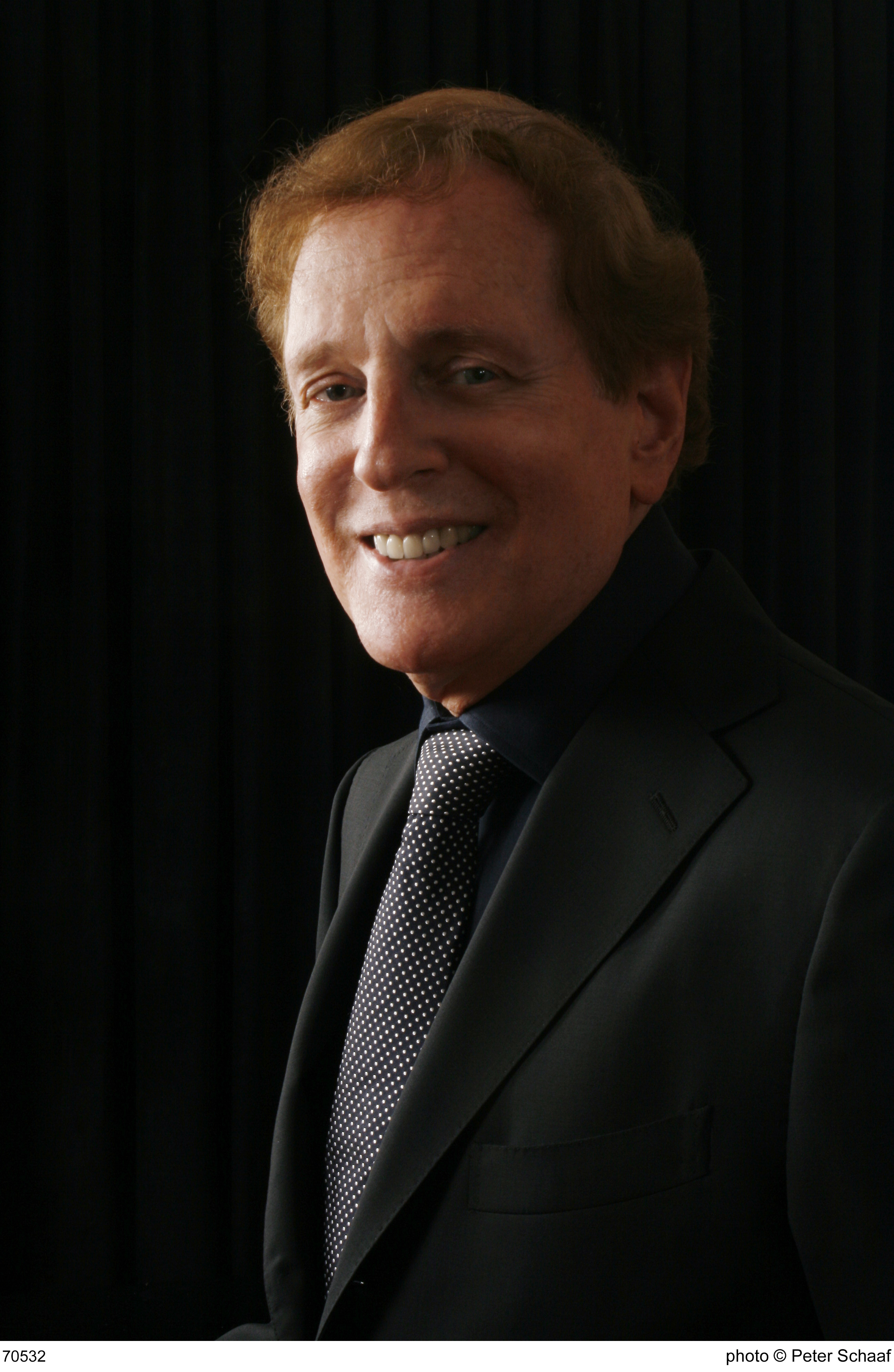
Steven Richman

Steven Richman is a GRAMMY Award-nominated American conductor and writer. He is music director of Harmonie Ensemble/New York, which he founded in 1979, and the Dvořák Festival Orchestra of New York.

== Career ==
Conductor Steven Richman's highly varied repertoire spans classical, jazz, and more for orchestra, chamber orchestra, symphonic jazz, big band, chamber- and wind ensemble. Richman and Harmonie Ensemble/New York are recipients of a GRAMMY Award nomination, as well as winners of the Lincoln Center Community Arts Award, WQXR Action for the Arts Award, and Classical Recording Foundation Award at Carnegie Hall. He has conducted 14 CDs, including a Toscanini 150th Anniversary Tribute comprising works by Rossini, Bizet/Toscanini, Tchaikovsky, Waldteufel/Toscanini, and Verdi, released in October 2017 on the Bridge Records label, with notes by Toscanini scholar Harvey Sachs. Richman's versatility is reflected in his conducting a wide variety of classical and jazz performances and recordings ranging from composers including Gershwin, Handel, Stravinsky, Copland, and Dvořák to Henry Mancini, Duke Ellington/Billy Strayhorn, and Gil Evans/Miles Davis.

Richman has conducted at all of New York's major halls, including Carnegie Hall, Alice Tully Hall at Lincoln Center, Merkin Concert Hall, and St. Peter's ("The Jazz Church"), and toured the United States under Columbia Artists Management.

He has conducted Dvořák with members of the National Symphony Orchestra in Washington, D.C., as well as the Janáček Philharmonic Orchestra in the Czech Republic, and given master classes on Dvořák at DePaul University in Chicago. Richman is featured guest commentator at Lincoln Center for the Performing Arts Library programs on subjects including Toscanini, Gershwin, and Dvořák.

Originally a French horn player, the New York-born Richman studied at the Manhattan School of Music with Arthur Berv, principal horn of the NBC Symphony Orchestra under Arturo Toscanini. He also studied with Richard Moore, principal of the Metropolitan Opera Orchestra, and Philip Farkas, principal of the Chicago Symphony. Richman was assistant principal horn in the American Symphony Orchestra at Carnegie Hall and Lincoln Center for the Performing Arts under Leopold Stokowski, as well as Leonard Bernstein and James Levine. He was a winner of the Concert Artists Guild Solo Recital Award. He participated in the Aspen Music Festival and studied conducting at the Pierre Monteux School.

Steven Richman appeared on the HBO TV Series, VINYL, as conductor with Broadway star Matt Bogart, appearing as Robert Goulet.

== Recordings ==
For three decades, Richman researched, performed, and recorded Gershwin's rare original symphonic orchestrations. In 2016 on the Harmonia Mundi label, he led a Gershwin orchestral CD including Concerto in F (with pianist Lincoln Mayorga), An American in Paris, and two premieres. In addition, in 2010 the multi-award-winning Gershwin by Grofé was also released on the Harmonia Mundi label featuring legendary clarinetist-bass clarinetist-alto saxophonist Al Gallodoro, soloist with the Paul Whiteman Orchestra, which premiered Rhapsody in Blue in 1924. Additional recordings include the 2002 GRAMMY Award-nominated Stravinsky: Histoire du Soldat (The Soldier's Tale) and Four Premieres, on Koch International Classics. He also recorded The Two Nutcrackers, Classical and Jazz, including the Tchaikovsky Nutcracker Suite, and the Duke Ellington/Billy Strayhorn jazz band version of the Nutcracker Suite, released in 2013. The 50th anniversary recording of the Miles Davis/Gil Evans Sketches of Spain with trumpeter Lew Soloff was released on Sheffield Lab and Copland: Rarities and Masterpieces on Bridge Records. The latter was also featured in the Ken Burns WNET-TV documentary The National Parks: America's Best Idea and on video. New York Times music critic James R. Oestreich chose Richman's Dvořák Discoveries CD as one of the Five Best Dvořák Recordings for the 2004 Dvořák Centennial. The disc included the premieres of the Octet-Serenade, as well as Dvořák's arrangement of Stephen Foster’s "Old Folks at Home" for baritone, chorus, and orchestra. The original Music for Peter Gunn by Henry Mancini was released in 2014, about which Richman was featured on National Public Radio’s All Things Considered. In addition, he has appeared on numerous radio stations worldwide, including WQXR, WNCN, WNYC, WFUV, and WBAI (New York), WFMT and WNIB (Chicago), BBC (London), and Czech Radio Prague .

== Dvořák Day Concerts ==
Beginning in 1994, Richman led a series of benefit concerts to place a statue of Czech composer Antonín Dvořák in New York City's Stuyvesant Square Park (across the street from where Dvořák lived at 327 E. 17th St. from 1892-95 and composed the "New World" Symphony). He conducted the Dvořák Day Concert on Sept. 13, 1997 (attended by the Lord Mayor of Prague, the Dvořák family, and film director Miloš Forman), which became an annual event, including both American and Czech artists. The New York City Council officially declared that date "Dvořák Day" at Richman's suggestion. The historic Dvořák Day Concert in St. George's Episcopal Church in Manhattan included the "New World" Symphony conducted by him, as well as Dvořák's great-grandson, violinist Josef Suk, playing the Sonatina for Violin and Piano (both composed at 327 E. 17th St.), and was released internationally on the Music & Arts label.

== Aaron Copland 80th Birthday Concert ==
Both Richman and Dean of American composers Aaron Copland conducted Harmonie Ensemble/New York at the Copland 80th Birthday Concert at New York's Symphony Space. The program was broadcast live on National Public Radio. Copland led the original 13-instrument version of Appalachian Spring and Richman conducted Copland's Music for the Theatre. A film, Copland at 80: A Self-Portrait, including the composer conducting Harmonie Ensemble/New York, has been broadcast internationally and released on video worldwide. Maestro Leonard Bernstein spoke, and was among the many prominent musical figures in attendance.

== Lincoln Center Concerts ==
At New York's Lincoln Center for the Performing Arts, Richman conducted a Handel 300th Birthday Concert at Damrosch Park featuring the first fireworks show in the history of Lincoln Center, a Gershwin Memorial Concert that drew the largest audience (10,000 people) in the history of the center, and a Leonard Bernstein 70th Birthday Concert, which received a special letter of commendation from New York City Mayor Ed Koch.

== United Nations Day Concerts ==
He served as music associate for United Nations Day Concerts international TV broadcasts, assisting director Humphrey Burton and collaborating with conductors including Yehudi Menuhin, Zubin Mehta, Lorin Maazel, Richard Bonynge, and Rafael Frühbeck de Burgos.

== Writing ==
He contributed to the book Dvořák in America and has written articles on Dvořák in New York. He wrote Copland and Me (about his collaboration with composer Aaron Copland), articles on Gershwin, Toscanini, cellist Martin Ormandy, and Gershwin's associate, composer Kay Swift. Richman also reviewed recordings on WQXR-FM's First Hearing, as well as reviewing concert videos for High Performance Review magazine.

== Personal life ==
Richman is married to violinist Katsuko Esaki. She has performed with New York orchestras including the Mostly Mozart Festival Orchestra at Lincoln Center for the Performing Arts, American Symphony Orchestra, and The Little Orchestra Society. Ms. Esaki also served as concertmaster for numerous Broadway shows including Guys and Dolls, A Funny Thing Happened on the Way to the Forum, The Producers, and Dreamgirls, as well as appearing on WNBC-TVs "Saturday Night Live" and recording with the Modern Jazz Quartet. Katsuko has toured Europe, Japan, the U.S., Canada, and Mexico, and performed for President Gerald Ford at the White House.

== Discography (Harmonie Ensemble/New York and Dvořák Festival Orchestra) ==
- Toscanini 150th Anniversary Tribute: Verdi: Aida Overture, Bizet/Toscanini: Carmen Suite, Waldteufel/Toscanini: Skaters Waltz, Tchaikovsky: Nutcracker Suite, Rossini: William Tell Overture (Bridge Records)
- Gershwin: Concerto in F, An American in Paris; 2 recording premieres: Three Preludes (arr. Bargy), Overture to Of Thee I Sing (radio version), with Lincoln Mayorga (piano) (Harmonia Mundi [PIAS])
- Mancini: Music for Peter Gunn (Harmonia Mundi [PIAS])
- Tchaikovsky and Ellington/Strayhorn: Nutcracker Suites: Classical and Jazz (Harmonia Mundi [PIAS])
- Gershwin by Grofé: "I Got Rhythm" Variations (original Gershwin orchestration), Rhapsody in Blue (original Paul Whiteman Orchestra Jazz Band version), Grofé arr. of "Yankee Doodle Blues" (2 versions: one recorded digitally; the second newly recorded on a wax cylinder on a 1909 Edison Fireside Phonograph), "That Certain Feeling," "Somebody Loves Me," "Sweet and Low-down," "I'll Build a Stairway to Paradise," "The Man I Love," "Fascinating Rhythm," "Summertime," Lincoln Mayorga (piano), Al Gallodoro (clarinet, alto sax, bass clarinet) (Harmonia Mundi [PIAS])
- Gil Evans/Miles Davis: Sketches of Spain, with Lew Soloff (trumpet) (Sheffield Lab)
- Symphonic Jazz: Grofé and Gershwin: Grofe: (original Whiteman Orchestra versions): Grand Canyon Suite, Mississippi Suite; Grofé: Gallodoro's Serenade, Gershwin (arr. Grofe): Second Rhapsody, with Lincoln Mayorga (piano), Al Gallodoro, (alto sax) (Bridge Records)
- Copland: Appalachian Spring Suite (original version), Music for the Theatre, 2 Ballads for Violin and Piano, Elegies for Violin and Viola, El Salón México, arranged for solo piano by Arturo Toscanini, with Eugene Drucker (violin), Lawrence Dutton (viola), Diane Walsh (piano) (Bridge Records)
- Stravinsky: GRAMMY AWARD NOMINATION Histoire du Soldat Suite, Octet for Winds, Pribaoutki, Pastorale, Lied ohne Name; 4 premieres: La Marseillaise, Hommage à Ramuz, Tango, The Mushrooms Go to War, with Mark Peskanov (violin), Lucy Shelton (soprano), Martin Bruns (baritone), Mikhail Svetlov (bass), Doris Stevenson (piano) (Koch International Classics)
- Dvořák Day Concert: "New World" Symphony, Sonatina for Violin and Piano, Fanfare, Humoresque (arr. Kreisler); Harry Burleigh (Dvořák's assistant): arr. "Deep River," with Josef Suk (violin), Lincoln Mayorga (piano) (Music & Arts)
- Dvořák: Discoveries: Octet-Serenade, Terzetto, Foster/Dvořák: "Old Folks at Home"; "Go Down, Moses" [rec. 1919 Harry Burleigh, Dvořák's assistant], with Arthur Woodley (bass-baritone), Collegiate Chorale (Music & Arts)
- Overtures for Classical Wind Ensemble: Rossini, Beethoven, Mozart, Weber (Music & Arts)
- Dvořák and Friends/Czech Wind Music: Dvořák: Wind Serenade, Slavonic Dance; Krommer Concerto for 2 Horns and Winds, Myslivecek: Octet No.2, with Charles Kavalovski, Scott Brubaker (horns) (Music & Arts)
- Salute to France: Poulenc: Aubade; Ibert: "Paris" Suite, Concerto for Cello and Winds; Milhaud: Little Symphony No. 5 for Winds; Hahn: Le Bal de Beatrice d’Este, with Ralph Votapek (piano), James Kreger (cello) (Music & Arts)
