= Lynn Vartan =

American percussionist

- Born: Fresno, California, U.S.
- Origin: United States
- Genres: Classical
- Occupations: Percussionist, Music educator
- Instrument: Marimba
- Labels: ECM New Series, Albany Records, Cuneiform Records, Bridge Records, New World Records, Lian Records, Yarlung Records, Cambria
- Member of: Southwest Chamber Music; Duo 61/4, Exacta

Lynn Vartan is an American percussionist. She began performing as a child in Fresno, California. Her principal instrument is the marimba.

== Collaborations ==
Vartan has worked with Michael Colgrass, Vinny Golia, Arthur Jarvinen, Ursula Oppens, Joan Tower, Glen Velez, Xtet, James Newton, Chinary Ung, the Hilliard Ensemble, the Tambuco Percussion Ensemble and Grammy award-winning Southwest Chamber Music. She has commissioned and/or performed countless new works for percussion by composers such as Donald Crockett, William Kraft, Steve Hoey, Veronika Krausas, Erica Muhl, Sean Heim, Jeff Holmes, Keith Bradshaw and Shaun Naidoo.

== Solo performances ==
As a recital soloist, Vartan has been featured on the Los Angeles Philharmonic Green Umbrella Series, the Different Trains Series, at universities in residence all over the United States and on the Music at the Court series in Pasadena, California, where she produced her own solo percussion concerts. As a concerto soloist, Vartan has performed with various orchestras including the Hubei Opera and Dance Company of Wuhan, China, the Sierra Wind Symphony, the Helena Symphony Orchestra, the Orchestra of Southern Utah, Southwest Chamber Music, as well as premiering new concertos by both American and Chinese composers.

== International projects ==
Vartan has participated in cultural exchange projects such as the “Ascending Dragon” Project in Vietnam, "The Dream of Helen" project in China and the “East Meets West” project designed around her as a soloist in Wuhan, China in 2014. In June 2020, Vartan was featured in the Visual Collaborative electronic catalog, under the Eta Carinae series, where she was interviewed alongside other artists from around the world.

== Recordings ==
As a recording artist, Vartan has appeared on the ECM New Series, Albany Records, Cuneiform Records, Bridge Records, New World Records, Lian Records, Yarlung Records and Cambria.

== Awards and sponsorships ==
Lynn was nominated three times for a Grammy with the Southwest Chamber Music for “Best Classical Album of the Year” and "Best Small Ensemble with or without a conductor" for Chávez: Complete Chamber Music, Vol. 3. and for the “Latin Classical Album of the Year” for William Kraft’s Complete Encounters Series. Lynn is endorsed by the Paiste Corporation, Remo Inc. and Marimba One.

== Other work ==
Vartan is the percussionist for Southwest Chamber Music, the violin/percussion Duo 61/4 which she founded with Shalini Vijayan, and a duo percussion group Exacta that she formed with Tambuco’s Miguel Gonzalez. As of 2015, she is currently the Director of Percussion at Southern Utah University.
