= Jeff von der Schmidt =

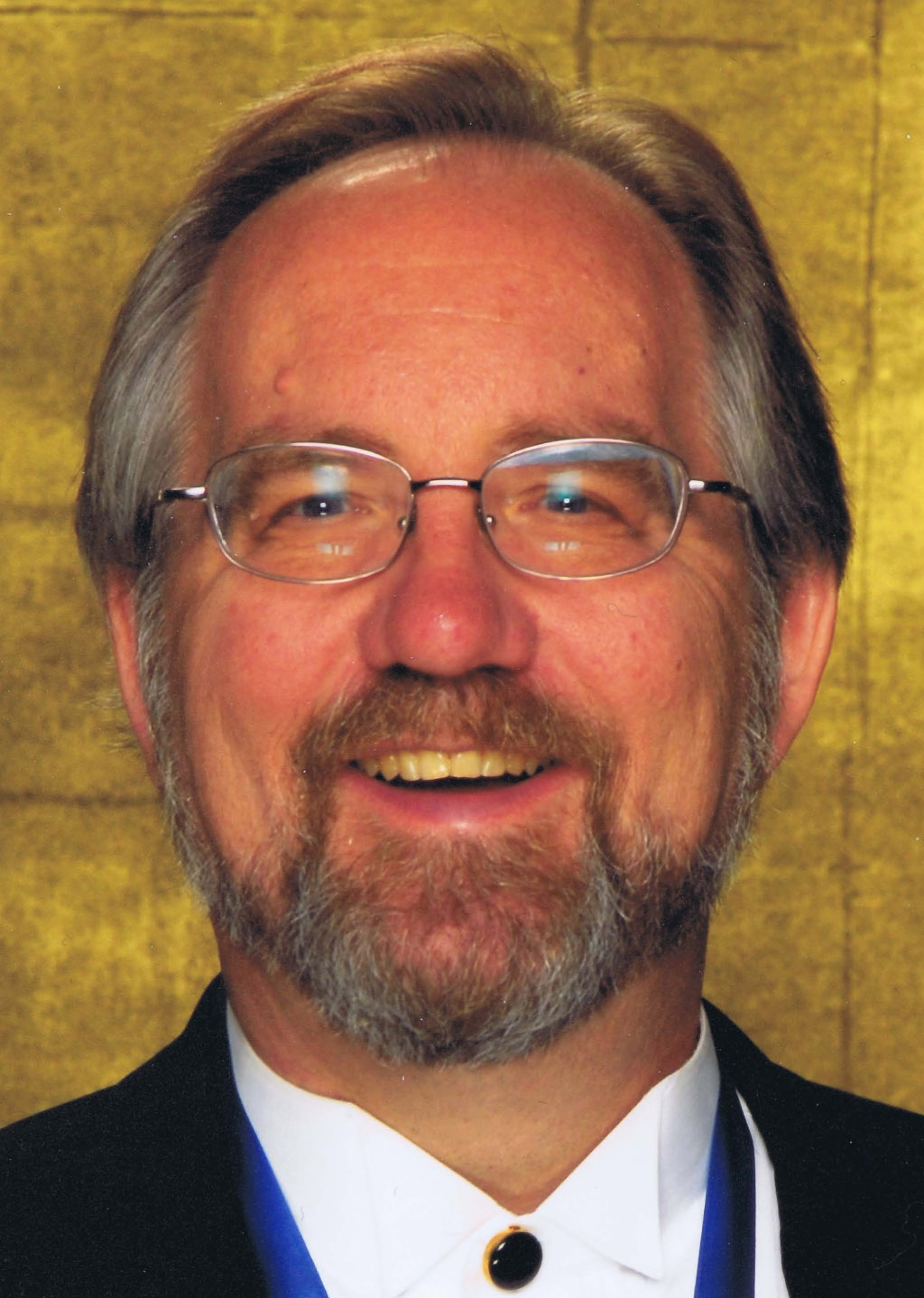
Jeff von der Schmidt

Jeff von der Schmidt (born 1955) is a Grammy Award-winning American conductor. He is the founding Artistic Director of Southwest Chamber Music and the Los Angeles International New Music Festival.

== Life and career ==
Von der Schmidt was born in Los Angeles, California. He holds a Certificate in German from the University of Vienna (Austria) and graduated from Loyola High School in Los Angeles and the University of Southern California.

Von der Schmidt is the conductor and Founding Artistic Director of Southwest Chamber Music (founded in 1987), the LA International New Music Festival (founded in 2012), and the Summer Festival at The Huntington (1994-2014). Mr. von der Schmidt received two Grammy Awards in 2003 and 2004 and a total of nine nominations for 30 compact disc recordings. In addition to his activities in Los Angeles, Mr. von der Schmidt has conducted concerts nationally and internationally in Europe, Asia, New York City, Washington, D.C., Mexico and Vietnam. He serves as conductor and Artistic Advisor to the Hanoi (Vietnam) New Music Ensemble. Mr. von der Schmidt created the 2010 Ascending Dragon Music Festival and Cultural Exchange, sponsored by the U.S. Department of State, the largest cultural exchange in history between Vietnam and the United States.

He has conducted and presented over 100 west-coast, local and world premieres through his programming of Latino, African-American, Asian, American, and women composers. Mr. von der Schmidt has brought about over 40 new commissions. His commissions of contemporary composers were assisted by soprano Phyllis Bryn-Julson through a 10 year collaboration which included the commission and performances of Richard Felciano's An American Decameron at the Library of Congress in Washington, D.C. Mr. von der Schmidt also conducted Ms. Bryn-Julson and the ensemble at the Arnold Schoenberg Center in Vienna, Austria, and New York's Cooper Union. Grawemeyer Award-winner Chinary Ung's Aura was the centerpiece of an Asian tour that included performances at the Royal University of Fine Arts (RUFA) and the 2006 World Culture Expo in Cambodia. Mr. von der Schmidt led five programs at Mexico City's National Autonomous University of Mexico (UNAM), presenting the Complete Chamber Music of Carlos Chávez from the Grammy Award-winning 5 CD recordings on Cambria Master Recordings.

== Honors ==
- Appointment by Vietnam Ministry of Culture as Artistic Advisor to the Hanoi New Music Ensemble and the Hanoi Philharmonic Orchestra 2015
- 2004 Grammy Award for conductor of Best Small Ensemble
- 2005 Grammy Award for conductor of Best Small Ensemble
- 2005 Grammy nomination for Best Classical Album
- 2006 Grammy nomination for Best Small Ensemble
- 2006 Latin Grammy nomination for Best Classical Album
- 2007 Grammy nomination for Best Small Ensemble
- 2007 Latin Grammy nomination for Best Classical Album
- 2009 Latin Grammy nomination for Best Classical Album
- 2013 Latin Grammy nomination for Best Classical Composition
