= Pomerium (group) =

Choral group

Pomerium is an American early music choral group founded by Alexander Blachly at the University of Notre Dame in 1972. The group has fostered the careers of early music performers including Julianne Baird, Drew Minter, and the members of Anonymous 4.
