= Thomas Flaherty (musician) =

American composer and cellist

Thomas "Tom" E. Flaherty (born 1950) is an American cellist, composer, and musicologist. He is the John P. and Magdalena R. Dexter Professor of Music at Pomona College in Claremont, California.
