= Martin Bruns =

Swiss baritone and academic (1960–2026)

Martin Bruns (25 November 1960 – 30 January 2026) was a Swiss baritone and music lecturer.

== Life and career ==
Bruns was born in Weil am Rhein on 25 November 1960. During his school years, Martin Bruns was a member of the Knabenkantorei Basel and was influenced by this musical environment. He first studied violin at the City of Basel Music Academy and then became a member of the Bern Symphony Orchestra. After a few years he decided to study singing in addition and attended the Fribourg and Zürich universities and Daniel Ferro's singing class at the Juilliard School in New York City. In addition, he took masterclass with renowned artists such as Irwin Gage, Ernst Haefliger, Arleen Augér and Phyllis Curtin.

After his studies, Bruns began his singing career as a member of the ensemble at the Hessian State Theatre in Wiesbaden. In addition, he has accepted numerous invitations to guest appearances at renowned German and European theatres and has performed with many major orchestras in Europe and North America. Bruns' repertoire includes vocal parts from early baroque music to Mozart and Mahler up to contemporary music.

A main focus of his vocal performances is the song repertoire, especially the lesser known works of the 20th century such as those by Ferruccio Busoni, Ignace Strasfogel or David Diamond. Bruns' regular piano accompanists include Kolja Lessing, Brian Zeger, Jan Philipp Schulze, Ulrich Eisenlohr and Christoph Hammer. Through numerous premieres and first performances, including the performance of a work by Paul Engel written especially for the Vienna Piano Trio and Martin Bruns based on poems by Ursula Haas entitled: Getäuscht hat sich der Albatros, Bruns has repeatedly championed contemporary music at the International Music Festival in Lucerne, the Salzburg Easter Festival or the Chamber Music Festival in Ottawa, among others.

Furthermore, in 2004, on the occasion of Francesco Petrarca's 700th birthday, he arranged 25 of his songs for medium voice and piano and performed them for the first time at the Festival Petrarca Musicale, which he himself initiated, at Schloss Kirchheim in Kirchheim unter Teck. Further highlights of his career were the Europe-wide live broadcast of his song recital Flies, you of my youth dreams from the Beethoven-Haus in Bonn, the first performance of Antonín Dvořák's song cycle Zypressen in the original version for voice and piano in Ludwigshafen am Rhein and Ljubljana, a US tour with Jan Philipp Schulze and the double production of Gian Carlo Menotti's The Telephone and Carl Orff's Die Kluge in Basel.

In February 2009 Bruns took over a singing class as substitute at the Zürcher Hochschule der Künste and one year later he was appointed visiting professor and from 2012 professor of singing at the Hochschule für Musik "Hanns Eisler" and was elected vice-rector from 2014 to 2016. In addition, he taught singing at the Hochschule für Musik und Tanz Köln, location Aachen, from 2010 to 2012.

Bruns died after a serious illness in Berlin, on 30 January 2026, at the age of 65.

== Recordings ==
- Franz Schubert: Die schöne Müllerin, edited for medium voice and guitar, Martin Bruns and Mats Bergström (guitar), Gehrmans Musikförlag, Stockholm, 1996
- George Frideric Handel: Rinaldo. Opera in three acts, role Argante, Händel Classic Audio HCA 7779, 1997
- George Frederick Handel: Serse. Role of Elviro, Hessian State Theatre Wiesbaden, 1997
- Ignace Strasfogel: Sonata KlNr. 1, Martin Bruns and Kolja Lessing (piano), Polygram, Hamburg, 1998
- Franz Schubert: German Schubert Song Edition Vol. 6 (Schiller Song Vol. 1); Martin Bruns and Ulrich Eisenlohr, Naxos, Munich, 2001
- Franz Schubert: German Schubert Song Edition Vol. 8 (Schiller Lieder Vol. 2); Martin Bruns and Ulrich Eisenlohr (piano), Naxos, Munich, 2002
- Ignace Strasfogel: selected works; Martin Bruns and Kolja Lessing (piano), UniversalMusic, Berlin, 2003
- La Baviera: Homage Music to Elector Karl Albrecht, World Music Distribution, Münster, 2003
- Francesco Petrarca: 25 Songs for medium voice and piano, Martin Bruns (ed. and revised), Bärenreiter, Prague, 2004
- Young Elite and Legends 2004 in the Cedar Hall at Kirchheim Castle, recording, Bella Musica, Bühl, 2004
- Philipp Jarnach: Early French Songs op. 15:3; Martin Bruns and Kolja Lessing (piano) and Heinrich Keller (flute); Divox, 2004
- Richard Wagner: Tristan and Isolde, Oehmsclassics, Munich, 2005
- Ferruccio Busoni: Busoni Songs; Martin Bruns and Ulrich Eisenlohr, Naxos, Munich, 2006
- In the night of the spring moon: settings to poems around Maximilian II of Bavaria by Emanuel Geibel and members of the Munich Writers Circle; Martin Bruns and Christoph Hammer (piano), Verlag Annette Schumacher, Ratingen, 2008
