= Lawrence Dutton =

- Born: 9 May 1954 (age 72); New York City, U.S.
- Genre: Classical
- Occupations: Musician, pedagogue
- Instrument: Viola
- Formerly of: Emerson String Quartet

Lawrence Dutton (born 9 May 1954) is an American violist, and a member of the Emerson String Quartet. He earned a bachelor's and master's degree from the Juilliard School where he studied with Lillian Fuchs.

He is a Distinguished Professor on the music faculty of the State University of New York at Stony Brook and a Distinguished Artist at the Robert McDuffie Center for Strings in Macon, Georgia. Dutton has been the artistic advisor of the Hoch Chamber Music Series since 2001. He collaborated with the late Isaac Stern in the International Chamber Music Encounters both in Jerusalem, Israel and Carnegie Hall. In 2015 the State University of New York Board of Trustees named Dutton to the Distinguished Rank.

Dutton is married to violinist Elizabeth Lim-Dutton. They have three sons.
