= Southwest Chamber Music =

- Origin: Los Angeles County, California
- Genres: Contemporary classical
- Occupation: Chamber ensemble
- Years active: 1987–present
- Labels: Cambria Master Recordings, distributed by Naxos
- Website: www.swmusic.org

Southwest Chamber Music is a chamber music ensemble (chamber ensemble) based in Los Angeles County, California. The organization was founded in 1987 by the artistic director Jeff von der Schmidt and the executive director Jan Karlin. One of the most active chamber music ensembles in the United States, the ensemble performs year round, provides educational programs, tours internationally, and has recorded 30 compact discs.

== About ==
Southwest Chamber Music provides concert and educational programming that combines traditional European classics, contemporary work by diverse American composers and modern music from Latin America and Asia. It presents a fall/winter/spring concert series in Los Angeles and Pasadena and, in the summer, the popular Summer Festival at The Huntington in San Marino, California. It also produces the biennial LA International New Music Festival.

== Educational programs ==
Project Muse in-school concerts and the Mentorship Program for student musicians serve low- and moderate-income students at schools in the Los Angeles, Alhambra and Pasadena Unified School Districts with in-depth programming that engages students through multiple visits by musicians and composers.

== International activities ==
Southwest Chamber Music has had extensive international activity in Europe, Mexico and Asia. In 2010, Southwest Chamber Music completed a major U.S. State Department-sponsored program with Vietnam – the Ascending Dragon Music Festival and Cultural Exchange – which was the largest cultural exchange in the history of the two countries and received worldwide media coverage. The project consisted of six weeks of programming, three weeks in Vietnam and three weeks in Southern California.

In December 2009, Southwest Chamber Music toured Mexico, representing the United States at the Guadalajara FIL Arts Festival, an arts festival produced alongside the world's largest Spanish book fair. Guadalajara invites one host country each year, which in 2009 featured 16 arts organizations from Los Angeles. The ensemble reunited with the Tambuco Percussion Ensemble of Mexico City for the performances.

In December 2006, the ensemble produced cultural exchange programs with Cambodia's Royal University of Fine Arts in Phnom Penh, the 2006 World Culture Expo at the temples of Angkor Wat and the Vietnam National Academy of Music. These were the first residencies by an American ensemble since the end of the Vietnam War and Khmer Rouge era in Southeast Asia.

In May 2007, Southwest Chamber Music performed at the UNAM Center in Mexico City with a cycle of five concerts of the complete chamber works of Carlos Chávez, joined by the Tambuco Percussion Ensemble. This was the first complete retrospective of Chávez's output in Mexico.

The ensemble has also been presented by the Library of Congress in Washington, D.C., Cooper Union in New York City, Santa Fe Chamber Music Festival, Getty Center, Orange County Performing Arts Center, Ojai Festival, and Luckman Fine Arts Center. Guest conductors appearing with the ensemble have included Oliver Knussen, Stephen L. Mosko and Charles Wuorinen. In March 2003, Southwest Chamber Music was the first American ensemble to perform at the Arnold Schoenberg Center in Vienna.

== Recordings ==
A two-time Grammy Award-winner, Southwest Chamber Music released its 30th recording in 2012 of music by Mexican composer Gabriela Ortiz, which received a Latin Grammy nomination for Best Classical Composition. The ensemble has received six Grammy nominations for its four volume cycle of the Complete Chamber Works of Carlos Chávez on Cambria Master Recordings. This recognition from the National Academy of Recording Arts and Sciences includes 2003 and 2004 Grammy Awards in the Best Small Ensemble category for Volumes 1 and 2. Three further nominations for Volume 3 are shared with the Tambuco Percussion Ensemble of Mexico City, including Best Classical Album and Best Small Ensemble nominations in 2005, and a Latin Grammy Best Classical Album nomination in 2006. Finally, Volume 4 was honored with a 2007 Latin Grammy Best Classical Album nomination.

Southwest Chamber Music's Composer Portrait Series on Cambria Master Recordings received a 2002 ASCAP-Chamber Music America Award for a "landmark set of 12 compact discs featuring American music of our time". The ensemble has also recorded works of Prokofiev and Poulenc on Cambria, as well as the late works of Krenek for Orfeo Records in Munich. The ensemble's 30 recordings are available from Cambria Master Recordings, with world-wide distribution by Naxos (Classics Online).
