= Non-Cognitive Aspects of the City =

Live album by Art Ensemble of Chicago
- Released: July 25, 2006
- Recorded: April 2 & 3 2004
- Genre: Jazz
- Label: Pi
- Producer: Art Ensemble of Chicago

Art Ensemble of Chicago chronology
Sirius Calling (2004)	Non-Cognitive Aspects of the City (2006)	Peace Be Unto You

Non-Cognitive Aspects of the City: Live at the Iridium is a live album by the Art Ensemble of Chicago, recorded in April 2004 at the Iridium Jazz Club in New York City and released in 2006 on the Pi Recordings label. It features performances by Joseph Jarman, Roscoe Mitchell and Don Moye with trumpeter Corey Wilkes and bassist Jaribu Shahid replacing the late Lester Bowie and Malachi Favors Maghostut.

== Reception ==
Professional ratings
Review scores
Source	Rating
AllMusic	4/5 stars
The Penguin Guide to Jazz Recordings	3/4 stars

The AllMusic review by Scott Yanow states that "Some of the music on this two-CD set is almost hard bop although a bit eccentric; other selections meander a bit in sound explorations or percussion displays, and others find the group pushing ahead".

== Track listing ==
- Disc One
1. "Song for My Sister" (Mitchell) - 17:00
2. "The Morning Mist" (Art Ensemble Of Chicago) - 6:47
3. "Song for Charles" (Mitchell) - 8:52
4. "On the Mountain" (Art Ensemble Of Chicago) - 19:25
5. "Big Red Peaches" (Mitchell) - 7:34
6. "Odwalla" (Mitchell) - 5:21
- Disc Two
1. "Erika" (Jarman) - 19:59
2. "Malachi" (Mitchell) - 9:01
3. "The J Song" (Jarman) - 11:46
4. "Red Sand Green Water" (Art Ensemble Of Chicago) - 14:28
5. "Slow Tenor and Bass" (Mitchell) - 2:27
6. "Odwalla" (Mitchell) - 3:59

Recorded live at Iridium, New York, on April 2 & 3, 2004

== Personnel ==
- Roscoe Mitchell: soprano saxophone, alto saxophone, tenor saxophone, baritone saxophone, clarinet, flute, percussion
- Joseph Jarman: soprano saxophone, alto saxophone, tenor saxophone, clarinet, flute, percussion
- Famoudou Don Moye: drums, percussion
- Corey Wilkes: trumpet, pocket trumpet, flugelhorn
- Jaribu Shahid: bass, electric bass
