= The Meeting (Art Ensemble of Chicago album) =

Studio album by Art Ensemble of Chicago
- Released: August 19, 2003
- Recorded: Spring 2003
- Genre: Avant-garde jazz Free jazz
- Label: Pi Recordings
- Producer: Seth Rosner

Art Ensemble of Chicago chronology
Reunion (2003)	The Meeting (2003)	Sirius Calling (2004)

The Meeting is a reunion studio album released by the jazz group the Art Ensemble of Chicago (AEOC). It was recorded during the spring of 2003 in Madison, Wisconsin and released on August 19, 2003, on the international label Pi Recordings.

== Background ==
The album was released the same year as their 2001 recording Tribute to Lester, but they were released on different labels. The album reunites Joseph Jarman with the rest of the AEOC after he "retired" in early 1990s after 23 years with the group in order to pursue a spiritual life, including running a Buddhist dojo in Brooklyn, New York. Reviews were mixed for the album, perhaps because, as National Public Radio reviewer Kevin Whitehead commented, "the ensemble is more of a business than a musical enterprise at this point."

== Reception ==
The album was met with mixed reviews. Allmusic's Thom Jurek awarded the album 4 stars, saying that ultimately, the album "is a glorious reunion album, one that delights as it provokes." Others have commented that the return of Jarman solidifies that "the AEC is a band to contend with." Jazz Word's Ken Waxman had other opinions, saying "the overriding feel of the session is so reductionist that the listener may feel as if he has wondered into a microtonal recital". NPR's Whiteman said both albums have "more filler than cafeteria meatloaf."

Most reviews comment that the absence of Lester Bowie is obvious. Review John Chacona of One Final note comments that "there were moments where I expected to hear a "blat" delivered with his perfect comic timing." The Penguin Guide to Jazz also mentions "an eerie moment" when "somebody plays something which sounds uncannily like a Lester Bowie break." All About Jazz reviewer Mark Corrotto says that Jarman's return "doesn't substitute for Bowie's absence, it merely aims the music in different directions" even though NPR's Whiteman says Jarman's return "makes the band seem like the real deal."

Professional ratings
Review scores
Source	Rating
Allmusic	4/5 stars
Penguin Guide to Jazz	3/4 stars

== Track listing ==
1. "Hail We Now Sing Joy" (Jarman) — 4:56
2. "It's the Sign of the Times" (Favors) — 18:44
3. "Tech Ritter and the Megabytes" (Mitchell) — 4:22
4. "Wind and Drum" (Art Ensemble of Chicago) — 11:09
5. "The Meeting" (Mitchell) — 6:49
6. "Amin Bidness" (Art Ensemble of Chicago) — 8:33
7. "The Train to Io" (Art Ensemble of Chicago) — 4:53

== Personnel ==
- Joseph Jarman — flute, percussion, gong, saxophone (alto, soprano, tenor), bells
- Malachi Favors Maghostus — bass, percussion
- Roscoe Mitchell — flute, piccolo, saxophone (alto, bass, soprano. tenor)
- Don Moye — bongos, conga, drums

Production:

- Kevin Beauchamp — production assistant
- Tom Blain — mastering
- Joseph Blough — photography
- Steve Gotcher, Buzz Kemper — engineer, editing, mixing
- David Holmes, Sammy Hunter — crew
- Seth Rosner — executive producer
- Yulun Wang — associate producer
