= Reunion (Art Ensemble of Chicago album) =

Live album by Art Ensemble of Chicago
- Released: 2003
- Recorded: January 22, 2003
- Genre: Jazz
- Label: Around jazz / Il Manifesto

Art Ensemble of Chicago chronology
Tribute to Lester (2003)	Reunion (2003)	The Meeting (2003)

Reunion is a live album recorded at Centro Rai di Produzione Radiofonica in Rome in January 2003 by the Art Ensemble of Chicago and released on the Italian Around Jazz label. It marked the return of Joseph Jarman to the group and features performances by Jarman, Roscoe Mitchell, Malachi Favors Maghostut and Don Moye with Baba Sissoko. It is the first live Art Ensemble album to be released following the death of founding member Lester Bowie.

== Track listing ==
1. "Illinstrum" (Don Moye/Malachi Favors) - 10:09
2. "T Two Twin" (Roscoe Mitchell) - 5:57
3. "Wolonà" (Baba Sissoko) - 4:41
4. "Ce Soir A Bankoni" (Sissoko/Moye) - 4:33
5. "Hail We Now Sing Joy" (Joseph Jarman) - 5:59
6. "Medley: All In Together/Zero/Alternate Line/Odwalla" (Mitchell/Lester Bowie/Mitchell/Mitchell) - 23:11
7. "Urban Bushmen (Art Ensemble of Chicago) - 6:28

- Recorded at Centro Rai di Produzione Radiofonica in Rome on January 22, 2003

== Personnel ==
- Joseph Jarman: sopranino saxophone, alto saxophone tenor saxophone, flute, percussion, voice
- Roscoe Mitchell: soprano saxophone, alto saxophone, flute, percussion
- Malachi Favors Maghostut: bass, percussion
- Don Moye: drums, congas, percussion
- Baba Sissoko: percussion
