= A Jackson in Your House =

Studio album by Art Ensemble of Chicago
- Released: 1969
- Recorded: 23 June 1969
- Studio: Studio Saravah, Paris, France
- Genre: Jazz
- Length: 33:21
- Label: BYG Actuel
- Producer: Jean Georgakarakos, Jean-Luc Young

Art Ensemble of Chicago chronology
Congliptious (1968)	A Jackson in Your House (1969)	Tutankhamun (1969)

A Jackson in Your House is a 1969 album by the Art Ensemble of Chicago recorded for the French BYG Actuel label. It features performances by Lester Bowie, Joseph Jarman, Roscoe Mitchell and Malachi Favors Maghostut. When issued on CD by Affinity in 1989, the track "The Waltz" was replaced by a six-minute live excerpt (of unknown provenance) entitled "Hey Friend" which has never reappeared on any subsequent reissue.

== Reception ==
Professional ratings
Review scores
Source	Rating
AllMusic	4.5/5 stars
Pitchfork	7.5/10
The Penguin Guide to Jazz Recordings	3.5/4 stars

The AllMusic review by Thom Jurek awarded the album 4 1/2 stars noting that "A Jackson in Your House is not the finest or most revelatory recording by the Art Ensemble of Chicago, but it is one of their more entertaining and carefree outings". Dominique Leone of Pitchfork called the music "a direct indication of the kind of projects the musicians had previously been involved with: free improvisation; counterpoint and modern European classical music; traditionally minded attempts to integrate African music into their sound; a significant theatric influence" and concluded, "This is heady stuff, and though I can hear the dedication in the performance, sometimes the feeling loses me". Reviewing the 2013 reissue, Lloyd Sachs of Jazz Times said, "A Jackson in Your House is highlighted by the circus-like title track; 'Ericka', a coolly charged, marimba-dappled, spoken-word declamation on '60s themes; and 'Song for Charles', a long, lyrical tribute to the band's recently deceased compadre Charles Clark".

== Track listing ==
All compositions by Roscoe Mitchell except as indicated

No.	Title	Length
1.	"A Jackson In Your House"	5:40
2.	"Get In Line"	5:45
3.	"The Waltz"	1:15
4.	"Ericka" (Jarman)	3:33
5.	"Song For Charles"	17:30

== Personnel ==
- Lester Bowie: trumpet, percussion instruments
- Malachi Favors Maghostut: bass, percussion instruments, vocals
- Joseph Jarman: saxophones, clarinets, percussion instruments
- Roscoe Mitchell: saxophones, clarinets, flute, percussion instruments
