= Don Moye =

American drummer

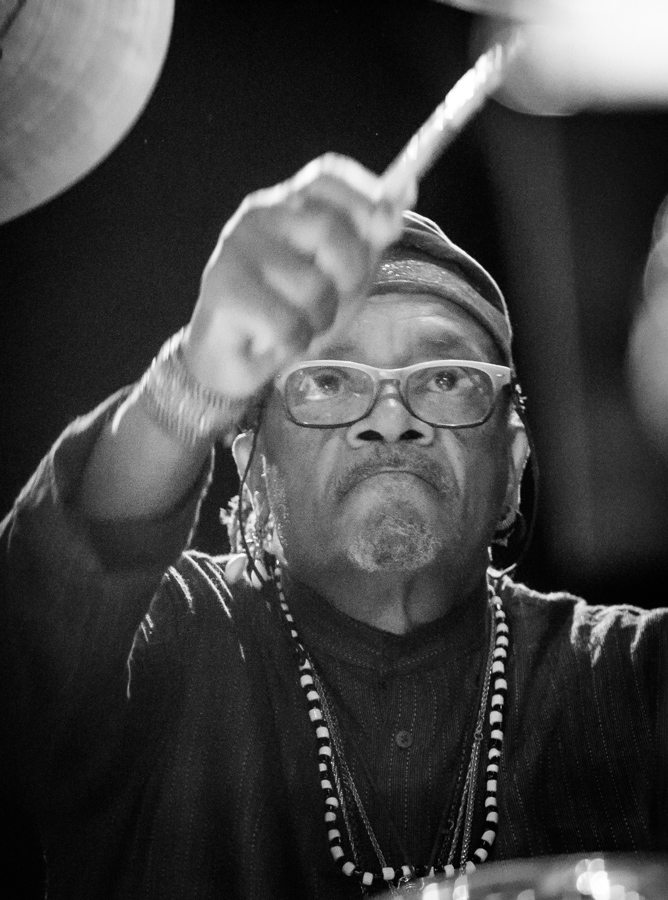
- Don Moye at the 2017 Kongsberg Jazzfestival

Background information
- Also known as: Famoudou Don Moye
- Born: Donald Moye, Jr. May 23, 1946 (age 79); Rochester, New York, U.S.
- Genres: Jazz, free jazz, avant-garde jazz
- Occupation: Musician
- Instruments: Drums, percussion
- Years active: 1960s–present
- Labels: Black Saint, AECO

Donald Moye, Jr. (born May 23, 1946), known as Famoudou Don Moye, is an American jazz percussionist and drummer. He is most known for his involvement with the Art Ensemble of Chicago and is noted for his mastery of African and Caribbean percussion instruments and rhythmic techniques.

== Early life and education ==
Moye was born in Rochester, New York, United States, and performed in various drum and bugle corps (including the Rochester Crusaders) during his youth, as well as church choir. Moye has commented that he really "didn't have an affinity for the bugle… and just kind of gravitated towards drums." He also took violin lessons during this time. Moye was exposed to jazz at an early age since his mother worked for a local social club, that had a jazz club next door, which hosted musicians such as Kenny Burrell and Jimmy McGriff. His family was also musically inclined; his uncles played saxophones and his father played drums. Also, his mother used to take him to various performances as a child, such as "opera under the stars" and to see Mahalia Jackson.

== Career ==
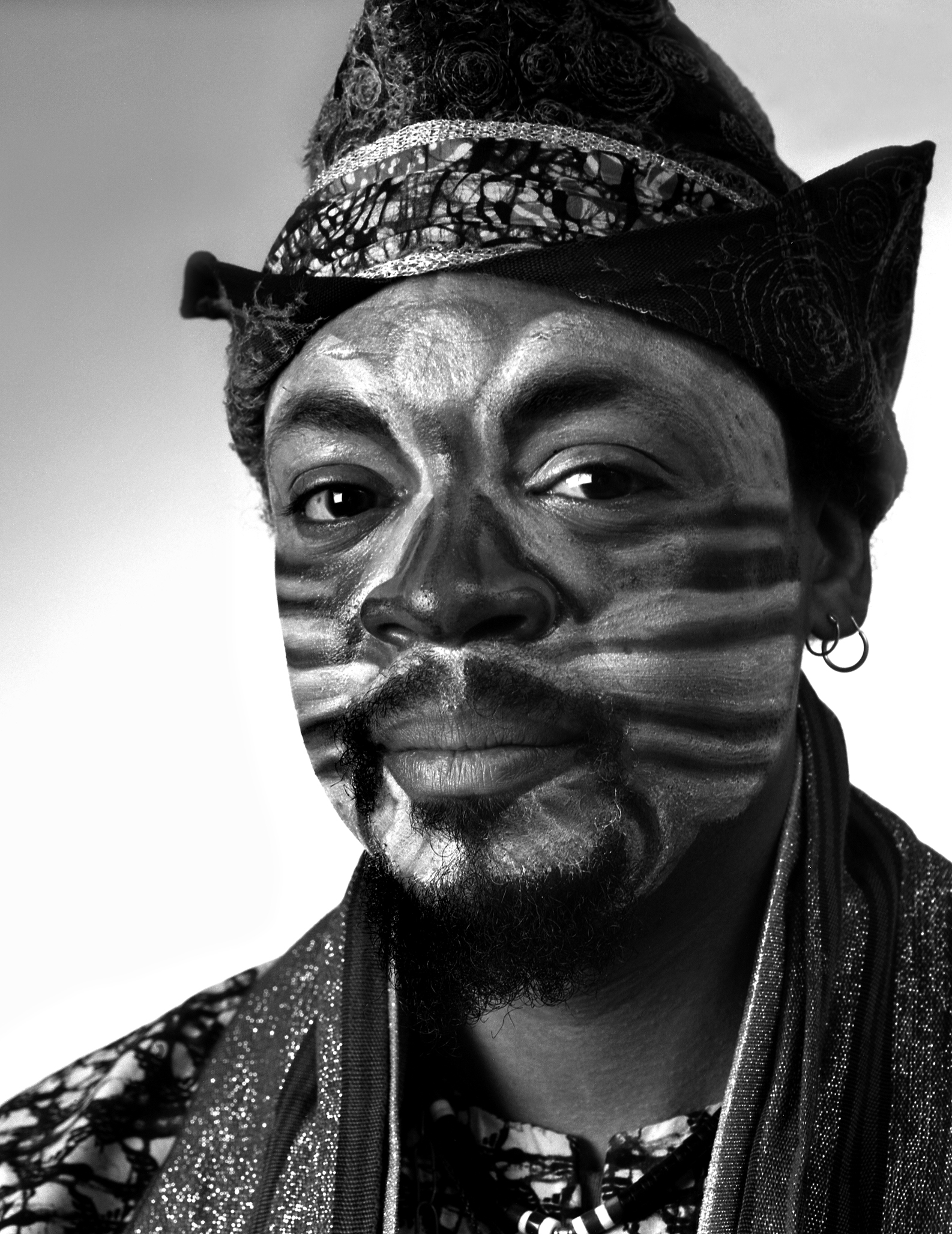
Don Moye

Moye went on to study percussion at Wayne State University in Detroit, Michigan. Moye lived in a building with trumpeter Charles Moore, who became his mentor. Moye also played in the groups African Cultural Ensemble, which included musicians from African countries such as Ghana, and Detroit Free Jazz, which was Moore's band. It was at this time that he first encountered the Association for the Advancement of Creative Musicians (AACM) due to the revolving door of musicians in and out of Moore’s residence. In early 1968, Moore’s band traveled to Europe and Moye decided to live there for the next couple of years, touring and visiting the continent as well as Northern Africa.

=== Art Ensemble of Chicago and The Leaders ===
By 1969, the AEC had become a quartet of Roscoe Mitchell, Joseph Jarman (saxophones), Lester Bowie (trumpet) and Malachi Favors Maghostut (bass), with no full-time drummer though all the musicians doubled on various percussion instruments. The group crossed the Atlantic Ocean and arrived in Europe to perform throughout the continent. Moye at the time was rehearsing and performing in Paris, France, at the American Center for Students and Artists, where musicians such as Art Taylor and Johnny Griffin practiced collectively. When Mitchell met with Moye again at the Center, he asked Moye to join his group, which was already known as the Art Ensemble of Chicago, and had issued several recordings, including three releases on the European label BYG Actual. These recordings did feature percussion but all percussion was played by Mitchell, Bowie, Favors, or Jarman.

After Moye returned to the States in the early 1970s, he played with the Black Artists Group in St. Louis, Missouri before settling in the Chicago, Illinois area. He was also in a duo with fellow percussionist Steve McCall who later was a member of Air with Henry Threadgil while still playing with the AEC. In the mid-1980s, Moye joined The Leaders, a jazz group consisting of AEC member Bowie, Chico Freeman, Arthur Blythe, Cecil McBee, and Kirk Lightsey. Moye has also recorded numerous solo albums as leader of his own band. Moye toured and recorded again with the AEC in the 1990s, which was dealt a blow with the 1999 death of Bowie. Moye refers to his own style of drumming as "Sun Percussion". Other groups he led in the 1990s include the Joseph Jarman/Famoudou Don Moye Magic Triangle Band and the Sun Percussion Summit (with Enoch Williamson), the latter of which was "a group dedicated to exploring the traditions of African-American percussion music."

== Recognition ==
- Downbeat International Critics Poll Winner – 1977, 1978, 1982
- New York Jazz Poll – 1979, 1980
- National Endowment for the Arts grants – 1974, 1981

== Discography ==
=== As leader or co-leader ===
- 1975 Sun Percussion, Vol. 1 – AECO
- 1981 Black Paladins – Black Saint
- 1983 Jam for Your Life! – AECO
- 1985 Cassava Balls – Praxis
- 1987 The African Tapes, Volume 1 – Praxis
- 1988 The African Tapes, Volume 2 – Praxis
- 1996 Afrikan Song with Enoch Williamson – AECO
- 1998 Ancestral Memories: From Afrika to Chicago – Il Manifesto
- 2002 A Symphony of Cities with Tatsu Aoki – Southport
- 2002 Bamako Chicago Express (Live in Longiano) – Il Manifesto

With the Art Ensemble of Chicago

Title	Year	Label
Chi-Congo	1970	Paula
Les Stances a Sophie	1970	Nessa
Live in Paris	1970	Freedom
Art Ensemble of Chicago with Fontella Bass	1970	America
Phase One	1971	America
Live at Mandell Hall	1972	Delmark
Bap-Tizum	1972	Atlantic
Fanfare for the Warriors	1973	Atlantic
Kabalaba	1974	AECO
Nice Guys	1978	ECM
Live in Berlin	1979	West Wind
Full Force	1980	ECM
Urban Bushmen	1980	ECM
Among the People	1980	Praxis
The Complete Live in Japan	1984	DIW
The Third Decade	1984	ECM
Naked	1986	DIW
Ancient to the Future	1987	DIW
The Alternate Express	1989	DIW
Art Ensemble of Soweto	1990	DIW
America - South Africa	1990	DIW
Thelonious Sphere Monk with Cecil Taylor	1990	DIW
Dreaming of the Masters Suite	1990	DIW
Live at the 6th Tokyo Music Joy	1990	DIW
Fundamental Destiny with Don Pullen	1991	AECO
Salutes the Chicago Blues Tradition	1993	AECO
Coming Home Jamaica	1996	Atlantic
Urban Magic	1997	Musica
Tribute to Lester	2001	ECM
Reunion	2003	Around Jazz/Il Manifesto
The Meeting	2003	Pi
Sirius Calling	2004	Pi
Non-Cognitive Aspects of the City	2006	Pi

With The Leaders

- Mudfoot (Black-Hawk, 1986)
- Out Here Like This (Black Saint, 1987)
- Heaven Dance (Sunnyside, 1988) as The Leaders Trio
- Unforeseen Blessings (Black Saint, 1988)
- Slipping and Sliding (Sound Hills, 1994)

=== As sideman ===
With Hamiet Bluiett

- Resolution (Black Saint, 1977)

With Kenny Clarke, Andrew Cyrille, and Milford Graves

- Pieces of Time (Soul Note, 1984)

With Chico Freeman

- No Time Left (Black Saint, 1979)
- Spirit Sensitive (India Navigation, 1979)

With Julius Hemphill

- Raw Materials and Residuals (Black Saint, 1977)

With Joseph Jarman

- The Magic Triangle (Black Saint, 1979) with Don Pullen
- Earth Passage - Density (Black Saint, 1981)

With Oliver Lake

- Ntu: Point from Which Creation Begins (Freedom, 1976)

With Cecil McBee

- Music from the Source (Enja, 1978)
- Compassion (Enja, 1979)
- Alternate Spaces (India Navigation, 1979)

With Marcello Melis

- Angedras (Black Saint, 1983)

With Don Pullen

- Milano Strut (Black Saint, 1978)

With Alan Silva

- Seasons (BYG, 1971)

With Sirone

- Artistry (Of The Cosmos, 1979)

With Wadada Leo Smith

- Spiritual Dimensions (Cuneiform, 2009)

With Randy Weston

- Carnival (Freedom, 1974)
