= Jam for Your Life! =

Studio album by Famoudou Don Moye
- Released: 1985
- Recorded: 1983–1991
- Studio: Sparrow Sound Design and North Shore Studios, Chicago, Illinois
- Genre: Jazz
- Length: 56:51
- Label: AECO Records; 1006; 3007

1985 cassette cover

Jam for Your Life! is an album by percussionist Famoudou Don Moye. It was recorded at Sparrow Sound Design and North Shore Studios in Chicago, Illinois. An initial version, with material recorded in September 1985, was released on cassette later that year by AECO Records, a label founded by the Art Ensemble of Chicago. In 1991, AECO reissued the album, with material recorded during 1983–1991, on CD with a different track order and an additional track. On the album, Moye is joined by multi-instrumentalist Ari Brown, vocalist Luba Raashiek, and nearly a dozen additional musicians.

== Reception ==
Professional ratings
Review scores
Source	Rating
AllMusic	3/5 stars
The Penguin Guide to Jazz	3/4 stars

In a review for JazzTimes, Willard Jenkins described the album as "an Afro-centric outing laden with percussion and the AACM sense of music with a theatrical bent that serves the dual purpose of exploration and entertainment," and wrote: "At the helm Moye's percussive colors, from djembe to traps, are lush and penetrating and the cast is a well-integrated bunch."

Jeff Potter of Modern Drummer stated: "From ancient to future, primal to complex, Moye's music retains a positive, on-the-spot urgency with all the right roots grit intact."

== CD Track listing ==
1. "Two City Suite: Sidi Ifni / Rokupuhr"" (Don Moye) – 8:17 (bonus track on CD)
2. "Solomon / Jam for Your Life" (Luba Raashiek) – 10:08
3. "One for Skip" (Ari Brown) – 6:03
4. "Black Nile" (Wayne Shorter) – 4:17
5. "Kamsar" (Don Moye) – 4:14
6. "Richard's Tune" (Ari Brown) – 10:05
7. "My Romance" (Richard Rodgers, Lorenz Hart) – 9:14
8. "Miles Mode" (John Coltrane) – 4:13
- Tracks 2, 4, 6 (second part), and 7 were recorded at North Shore Studios in Chicago during 1983–85. Tracks 1, 3, 5, 6 (first part), and 8 were recorded at Sparrow Sound Design in Chicago during 1986–91.

== Personnel ==
- Famoudou Don Moye – drums, congas, percussion, gong, vocals
- Ari Brown – soprano saxophone, alto saxophone, tenor saxophone, clarinet, piano (tracks 1–4, 6–8)
- Luba Raashiek – vocals (tracks 2, 4, 7, 8)
- Sela Allen – wooden flute, vocals (track 1)
- Bill Brimfield – trumpet (tracks 2, 4, 7)
- Sonny Covington – trumpet (track 6)
- Ken Prince – piano (tracks 3, 6, 8)
- Thomas Palmer – bass (tracks 3, 6)
- Rollo Radford – bass (tracks 2, 4, 7, 8)
- Kewu – congas (track 8)
- L.T. Beauchamp – harmonica (track 1)
- Enoch Williamson – talking drum, vocals (track 1)
- Sura Ramses – bass tambourine, vocals (track 1)
- Joel Brandon – whistling (tracks 1, 5)
