= Live at Last =

Live at Last may refer to:

Albums

- Live at Last (Bette Midler album)
- Live at Last (Black Sabbath album)
- Live at Last (Enchant album)
- Live at Last (Maghostut Trio album)
- Live at Last (Steeleye Span album)
- Live at Last (The Slickee Boys album)
- Live at Last, an album by the Subdudes

Videos

- Live at Last (Anastacia video)
- Live at Last (The Charlatans video)
