= Eda Wobu =

Studio album by Art Ensemble of Chicago
- Released: 1969
- Recorded: October 5, 1969
- Studio: Paris, France
- Genre: Jazz
- Length: 48:48
- Label: JMY

Art Ensemble of Chicago chronology
| Reese and the Smooth Ones (1969) | Eda Wobu (1969) | Comme à la radio (1970) |

Eda Wobu is an album by the Art Ensemble of Chicago recorded in Paris in 1969 and first released in 1991 by the Italian JMY label. It features performances by Lester Bowie, Joseph Jarman, Roscoe Mitchell and Malachi Favors Maghostut.

Professional ratings
Review scores
| Source | Rating |
|---|---|
| Allmusic | 2/5 stars |

== Track listing ==
1. "Eda Wobu" (Art Ensemble of Chicago) - 48:48

== Personnel ==
- Lester Bowie – trumpet, percussion instruments
- Malachi Favors Maghostut – bass, percussion instruments, vocals
- Joseph Jarman – saxophones, clarinets, percussion instruments
- Roscoe Mitchell – saxophones, clarinets, flute, percussion instruments
