= Afrikan Song =

1996 studio album by Moye and Williamson

Studio album by Famoudou Don Moye and Enoch Williamson with the Sun Percussion Summit & More
- Released: 1996
- Recorded: 1995 and 1996
- Studio: Sparrow Sound Design, Chicago, Illinois
- Genre: Jazz
- Length: 1:04:04
- Label: AECO Records; 3009; Southport Records; 3009

Afrikan Song is an album by percussionists Famoudou Don Moye and Enoch Williamson. It was recorded in 1995 and 1996 at Sparrow Sound Design in Chicago, Illinois, and was released on CD in 1996 by AECO Records, a label founded by the Art Ensemble of Chicago, and Southport Records. On the album, Moye and Williamson are joined by members of a group called Sun Percussion Summit & More.

== Reception ==
Professional ratings
Review scores
Source	Rating
AllMusic	4/5 stars
The Penguin Guide to Jazz	3/4 stars

In a review for Jazz Times, Willard Jenkins called the album "an organic recording preaching, teaching, and celebrating the Motherland," and wrote: "this recording is in the manner of a percussion discussion on Africana... The imagery is rife on this outing."

Writing for the Chicago Tribune, Howard Reich commented: "the recording evokes distant eras in the pre-history of jazz. The intricate African rhythms and polyrhythms, fervent passages of solo and ensemble chant and astonishing array of percussion color offer a world of sound rarely heard on recordings... these artists say a great deal about the flow of black music through the ages. By any measure, a haunting and indelible recording."

== Track listing ==
1. "Afrikan Song" (Enoch Williamson) – 7:06
2. "Mada" (Mamane Samake) – 6:20
3. "Diaspora Express Suite: Clear Confusion (Poem Excerpt)" (Famoudou Don Moye) – 0:36
4. "Diaspora Express Suite: A Body Without a Head / Home Song" (Famoudou Don Moye) – 3:57
5. "Diaspora Express Suite: Reflections on the Middle Passage" (Famoudou Don Moye) – 3:56
6. "Diaspora Express Suite: Welcome / Diaspora Express" (Famoudou Don Moye) – 4:53
7. "Just My Imagination (Running Away with Me)" (Barrett Strong, Norman Whitfield) – 5:09
8. "Hot Pepper Mambo" (Enoch Williamson) – 3:08
9. "Big Red Peaches" (Roscoe Mitchell) – 4:55
10. "Alili" (Naby "Papus" Camera) – 6:02
11. "By the Rivers of Babylon / Ol' Time Religion" (Traditional) – 5:22
12. "Malachi (Weah Solo)" (Famoudou Don Moye) – 1:06
13. "Ancestral Memories" (Babu Atiba / Famoudou Don Moye) – 2:35
14. "Walk of the Lunga" (Paul Cotton / Enoch Williamson) – 3:09
15. "Super Yeye" (Naby "Papus" Camera) – 5:24

== Personnel ==
- Famoudou Don Moye – percussion, vocals
- Enoch Williamson – percussion, vocals
- Herb Walker – guitar
- Calvin "Koko" Brunson – keyboards, vocals
- Oscar "Bobo" Brown III – bass, vocals
- G'ra – narrator
- Babu Atiba – percussion, vocals
- Clifton Robinson – percussion, vocals
- Meshak Silas – percussion, vocals
- Selah Allen – percussion, vocals
- P.C. Cotton – percussion, vocals
- Mamane Samake – percussion
- Naby Camara – percussion
