= Old/Quartet =

Studio album by Roscoe Mitchell
- Released: 1975
- Recorded: May 18, 19 & November 25, 1967
- Genre: Jazz
- Length: 50:16
- Label: Nessa
- Producer: Chuck Nessa

Roscoe Mitchell chronology
Sound (1966)	Old/Quartet (1975)	Early Combinations (1967)

Old/Quartet is an album recorded in 1967 by Roscoe Mitchell's Art Ensemble which later became known as the Art Ensemble of Chicago. It was released on the Nessa label in 1975 and features performances by Mitchell, Lester Bowie, Malachi Favors Maghostut and Phillip Wilson.

== Reception ==
The Allmusic review by Brian Olewnick awarded the album 4½ stars stating "While perhaps a small step below Congliptious, it is nonetheless a beautiful album in its own right and one that ranks very high in Roscoe Mitchell's discography".

Professional ratings
Review scores
Source	Rating
Allmusic	4.5/5 stars
The Rolling Stone Jazz Record Guide	5/5 stars

== Track listing ==
Side One

1. "Old" - 8:09
2. "Quartet Part 1" - 19:40

Side Two

1. "Quartet Part 2" 18:03
2. "Solo" - 5:34

All compositions by Roscoe Mitchell except as indicated
- "Old" recorded May 18, 1967, "Quartet" recorded May 19, 1967 and "Solo" recorded November 25, 1967

== Personnel ==
- Roscoe Mitchell: alto saxophone, soprano saxophone, clarinet, flute, percussion instruments
- Lester Bowie: trumpet, flugelhorn, percussion instruments (except Side Two track 2)
- Malachi Favors Maghostut: bass, percussion instruments (except Side Two track 2)
- Phillip Wilson: drums (except Side Two track 2)
