= Black Paladins =

Studio album by Joseph Jarman & Don Moye
- Released: 1979
- Recorded: December 19 & 20, 1979
- Genre: Jazz
- Length: 37:20
- Label: Black Saint
- Producer: Giacomo Pellicciotti

Joseph Jarman chronology
The Magic Triangle (1979)	Black Paladins (1979)	Earth Passage – Density (1981)

Black Paladins is an album by American jazz saxophonist Joseph Jarman and percussionist Don Moye featuring Johnny Dyani recorded in 1979 for the Italian Black Saint label.

== Reception ==
The Allmusic review by Brian Olewnick awarded the album 4½ stars stating "Black Paladins was the Jarman/Moye duo's most successful effort, and one of the most rewarding projects either was involved with outside of the Art Ensemble. A delicious recording".

Professional ratings
Review scores
Source	Rating
Allmusic	4.5/5 stars

== Track listing ==
All compositions by Joseph Jarman except as indicated

1. "Mama Marimba" (Johnny Dyani) - 3:22
2. "In Memory of My Seasons" - 6:20
3. "Humility in the Light of the Creator" (Kalaparusha Maurice McIntyre) - 8:33
4. "Black Paladins" (Henry Dumas, Jarman) - 8:04
5. "Ginger Song" - 2:54
6. "Ode to Wilbur Ware" (Don Moye) - 8:07
- Recorded at Barigozzi Studio in Milano, Italy on December 19 & 20, 1979

== Personnel ==
- Joseph Jarman - sopranino saxophone, tenor saxophone, baritone saxophone, conch shell, flute, bamboo flute, frog flute, bass clarinet, voice
- Don Moye - drums, donno, chekere, conch shell, congas, rattle, bendir, whistles, trap drums, bird calls
- Johnny Dyani - piano, bass, tambourine, voice
