= Tribute to Lester =

Studio album by Art Ensemble of Chicago
- Released: August 26, 2003
- Recorded: September 2001
- Studio: Chicago
- Genre: Jazz
- Label: ECM; ECM 1808
- Producer: Manfred Eicher

Art Ensemble of Chicago chronology
Urban Magic (1997)	Tribute to Lester (2003)	Reunion (2003)

Tribute to Lester is an album by the Art Ensemble of Chicago recorded in September 2001 and released on ECM in August 2003—their first release on the label since The Third Decade (1984). The ensemble, now a trio, features reed player Roscoe Mitchell and rhythm section Malachi Favors Maghostut and Don Moye. The album was recorded following Joseph Jarman's temporary retirement from the group and the death of founding member Lester Bowie, to whom it is dedicated.

== Reception ==
The AllMusic review by Richard S. Ginell awarded the album 4 stars, noting that, "the group receives probably the most stunning, precisely etched recorded sound of its existence. Yet despite the retrospective nature of some of the selections, there is no overt nostalgia or compromise in the AEC's aesthetic stance, probably figuring that Bowie would have wanted it that way."

Professional ratings
Review scores
Source	Rating
AllMusic	4/5 stars
The Penguin Guide to Jazz Recordings	3/4 stars

== Track listing ==
No.	Title	Writer(s)	Length
1.	"Sangaredi"	Moye
2.	Untitled		7:42
3.	"Suite for Lester"		5:24
4.	"Zero/Alternate Line"	Bowie; Mitchell	9:16
5.	"Tutankhamun"	Favors	8:10
6.	"As Clear as the Sun"	Favors; Mitchell; Moye	12:41
7.	"He Speaks to Me Often in Dreams"	Favors; Mitchell; Moye	13:52

== Personnel ==
=== Art Ensemble of Chicago ===
- Roscoe Mitchell – saxophones, clarinets, flute, percussion instruments
- Malachi Favors Maghostut – bass, percussion instruments
- Don Moye – drums, percussion
