= Early Combinations =

Studio album by Art Ensemble
- Released: 2012
- Recorded: September 2 & November 2, 1967
- Studio: Lester Bowie home, Chicago
- Genre: Jazz
- Length: 44:26
- Label: Nessa
- Producer: Chuck Nessa

Roscoe Mitchell chronology
Old/Quartet (1967)	Early Combinations (2012)	Congliptious (1968)

Early Combinations is an album by a formative stage of the band which later became the Art Ensemble of Chicago. It was recorded in 1967 at Lester Bowie's home but not issued as a single CD until 2012 by Nessa Records. The two tracks on the album were originally included in the 1993 limited edition box set Art Ensemble 1967/68, also released by Nessa. "A To Ericka" was recorded for submission to a Jazz Festival in Poland and was unsuccessful in its purpose. "Quintet" was a dress rehearsal for a concert arranged by Jarman to take place at Winnetka High School that was cancelled.

== Reception ==
The JazzTimes review by Mike Shanley notes that "It’s impressive how strong these two 20-minute-plus tracks sound, considering the group was not a proper unit at the time."

== Track listing ==
1. "A to Ericka" (Favors / Mitchell / Jarman) - 21:39
2. "Quintet" (Joseph Jarman) - 22:47

== Personnel ==
- Roscoe Mitchell - alto sax, soprano sax, clarinet, flute
- Joseph Jarman - alto sax, sopranino sax, clarinet, flute, bassoon
- Lester Bowie - trumpet, flugelhorn
- Malachi Favors - bass
- Charles Clark - bass on #1
- Thurman Barker - drums
