= Sirius Calling =

Studio album by Art Ensemble of Chicago
- Released: September 7, 2004
- Recorded: April 24–26, 2003
- Genre: Jazz
- Label: Pi Recordings
- Producer: Art Ensemble of Chicago

Art Ensemble of Chicago chronology
The Meeting (2003)	Sirius Calling (2004)	Non-Cognitive Aspects of the City (2006)

Professional ratings
Review scores
Source	Rating
Allmusic	3.5/5 stars
The Penguin Guide to Jazz Recordings	2.5/4 stars

Sirius Calling is an album by the Art Ensemble of Chicago recorded in April, 2003 in Madison, Wisconsin and released in 2004 on the Pi Recordings label. It features performances by Joseph Jarman, Roscoe Mitchell and Don Moye with Malachi Favors Maghostut on what would be the final album before his death. It was recorded on April 24–26, 2003 in Madison, WI.

== Reception ==
The Allmusic review by Scott Yanow states that "The music is as adventurous as ever ... the interplay between the four musicians, the mood variation (which ranges from jubilant to introspective sound explorations) and the wide range of tonal colors (Mitchell and Jarman play many different instruments) usually keep the concise music continually intriguing".

== Track listing ==
1. "Sirius Calling" (Art Ensemble Of Chicago) – 3:27
2. "Come on Y'all" (Art Ensemble Of Chicago) – 4:10
3. "Two-Twenty" (Jarman, Moye) – 2:23
4. "He Took a Cab to Neptune" (Art Ensemble Of Chicago) – 6:24
5. "Everyday's a Perfect Day" (Jarman, Moye) – 2:48
6. "Til Autumn" (Mitchell) – 6:07
7. "Dance of Circles" (Art Ensemble Of Chicago) – 5:39
8. "Cruising with JJ" (Art Ensemble Of Chicago) – 4:33
9. "You Can't Get Away" (Art Ensemble Of Chicago) – 3:48
10. "Taiko" (Art Ensemble Of Chicago) – 8:48
11. "There's a Message for You" (Art Ensemble Of Chicago) – 4:21
12. "Slow Tenor and Bass" (Mitchell) – 5:22
13. "Voyage" (Favors, Mitchell) – 3:32
14. "The Council" (Art Ensemble Of Chicago) – 3:30

== Personnel ==
- Roscoe Mitchell: soprano saxophone, alto saxophone, tenor saxophone, baritone saxophone, clarinet, flute, percussion
- Joseph Jarman: soprano saxophone, alto saxophone, tenor saxophone, clarinet, flute, percussion
- Famoudou Don Moye: drums, percussion
- Malachi Favors Maghostut: bass, percussion instruments
