= Coming Home Jamaica =

Studio album by Art Ensemble of Chicago
- Released: 1998
- Recorded: December 27, 1995 & January 16, 1996
- Genre: Jazz
- Length: 41:43
- Label: Atlantic
- Producer: Art Ensemble of Chicago, Gerry Percy

Art Ensemble of Chicago chronology
Salutes the Chicago Blues Tradition (1994)	Coming Home Jamaica (1998)	Urban Magic (1999)

2002 Reissue Cover

Professional ratings
Review scores
Source	Rating
Allmusic	3/5 stars
The Penguin Guide to Jazz Recordings	2.5/4 stars

Coming Home Jamaica is a 1998 album by the Art Ensemble of Chicago originally released on the Atlantic label and reissued in 2002 on the Dreyfus label. It features performances by Lester Bowie, Roscoe Mitchell, Malachi Favors Maghostut and Don Moye with Bahnamous Lee Bowie guesting on one track.

== Reception ==
The Allmusic review by Richard S. Ginell states that "the whole album seems to have a relaxed, carefree, even at times lackadaisical feeling... this AEC working holiday is not going to push many envelopes".

== Track listing ==
1. "Grape Escape" (Bowie) - 3:55
2. "Odwalla/Theme" (Mitchell) - 5:06
3. "Jamaica Farewell" (Mitchell) - 1:57
4. "Mama Wants You" (Bowie, Favors) - 12:34
5. "Strawberry Mango" (Art Ensemble of Chicago) - 3:46
6. "Villa Tiamo" (Bowie) - 1:47
7. "Malachi" (Mitchell) - 9:33
8. "Lotta Colada" (Art Ensemble of Chicago) - 3:05

The 2002 reissue changes the track order and features three additional tracks:

- "Villa Tiamo" [alternate take] (Bowie) - 1:41
- "C Monster" (Mitchell) - 6:49
- "Blue Hole/Mr. Freddy" (Mitchell) - 11:54
  - Recorded December 27, 1995 & January 16, 1996, in Bonham Springs, Ocho Rios, Jamaica

== Personnel ==
- Lester Bowie: trumpet, fluegelhorn
- Malachi Favors Maghostut: bass, percussion instruments
- Roscoe Mitchell: saxophones, clarinets, flute, percussion instruments
- Don Moye: drums, percussion
- Bahnamous Lee Bowie: keyboards (track 5)
