= Kabalaba =

Live album by Art Ensemble of Chicago
- Released: 1978
- Recorded: July 4, 1974
- Venue: Montreux Jazz Festival, Montreux, Switzerland
- Genre: Jazz
- Length: 50:00
- Label: AECO
- Producer: Art Ensemble of Chicago

Art Ensemble of Chicago chronology
Fanfare for the Warriors (1973)	Kabalaba (1978)	Nice Guys (1978)

Kabalaba is a live album by the Art Ensemble of Chicago recorded at the Montreux Jazz Festival in 1974 and released on their AECO label in 1978. It features performances by Lester Bowie, Joseph Jarman, Roscoe Mitchell, Malachi Favors Maghostut, and Don Moye along with Muhal Richard Abrams.

== Reception ==
The Allmusic review by Brian Olewnick states "This recording contains several fine episodes, but the interested listener would do better to hear [Fanfare for the Warriors] for a full picture of this particular Art Ensemble incarnation's great powers".

Professional ratings
Review scores
Source	Rating
Allmusic	2.5/5 stars

== Track listing ==
1. "Kabalaba-Bees" (Art Ensemble of Chicago) - 3:10
2. "Interlude" (Art Ensemble of Chicago) - 2:00
3. "Kaba Song" (Don Moye) - 4:32
4. "Interlude" (Art Ensemble of Chicago) - 1:15
5. "Theme for Sco/Kabalaba" (Joseph Jarman) - 14:48
6. "Duo" (Muhal Richard Abrams) - 2:10
7. "Sun Precondition One" (Moye) - 5:30
8. "Interlude" (Art Ensemble of Chicago) - 1:48
9. "Improvization A2" (Roscoe Mitchell) - 6:00
10. "Mal's Delight" (Lester Bowie) - 3:50
11. "Kabalaba Speaks" (Art Ensemble of Chicago) - 4:57

== Personnel ==
- Lester Bowie: trumpet, percussion instruments
- Malachi Favors Maghostut: bass, percussion instruments, vocals
- Joseph Jarman: saxophones, clarinets, percussion instruments
- Roscoe Mitchell: saxophones, clarinets, flute, percussion instruments
- Don Moye: drums, percussion
- Muhal Richard Abrams: piano
