= The Spiritual =

Studio album by Art Ensemble of Chicago
- Released: 1969
- Recorded: June 26, 1969
- Studio: Polydor Studios (Dames II), Paris, France
- Genre: Jazz
- Length: 38:34
- Label: Freedom; Black Lion Records
- Producer: Alan Bates, Chris Whent

Art Ensemble of Chicago chronology
Tutankhamun (1969)	The Spiritual (1969)	People in Sorrow (1969)

The Spiritual is an album by the Art Ensemble of Chicago recorded in 1969 for the Freedom label as the same sessions that produced Tutankhamun. It features performances by Lester Bowie, Joseph Jarman, Roscoe Mitchell and Malachi Favors Maghostut.

== Reception ==
Professional ratings
Review scores
Source	Rating
AllMusic	4/5 stars

The AllMusic review stated "this stunning 1974 album, The Spiritual, finds the Art Ensemble of Chicago at their artistic height. Reduced to an unusual drummerless quartet for this session (reedsmen Joseph Jarman and Roscoe Mitchell, horn player Lester Bowie and bassist/banjo player Malachi Favors all double on various types of percussion), the group explores one of the main stems of jazz, New Orleans gospel and second-line music, without sacrificing its freer sounds. Indeed, without a traditional drummer, the group is free to play at its most unrestrained, unfettered by conventions of tempo".

== Track listing ==
1. "Toro" (Roscoe Mitchell) - 8:30
2. "Lori Song" (Joseph Jarman) - 3:58
3. "That the Evening the Sky Fell Through the Glass Wall and We Stood Alone Somewhere?" (Lester Bowie, Joseph Jarman) - 6:00
4. "The Spiritual" (Mitchell) - 20:06

== Personnel ==
- Lester Bowie: trumpet, percussion instruments
- Malachi Favors Maghostut: bass, percussion instruments, vocals
- Joseph Jarman: saxophones, clarinets, percussion instruments
- Roscoe Mitchell: saxophones, clarinets, flute, percussion instruments
