= Joseph Jarman =

American musician, composer, poet, and Buddhist priest

- Born: September 14, 1937; Pine Bluff, Arkansas, U.S.
- Origin: Chicago, Illinois, U.S.
- Died: January 9, 2019 (aged 81) Englewood, New Jersey, U.S.
- Genres: Avant-garde jazz, free jazz
- Occupation: Musician
- Instrument: Saxophone
- Years active: 1961–2019
- Labels: Delmark, Black Saint AECO, India Navigation, Music & Arts

Joseph Jarman (September 14, 1937 – January 9, 2019) was an American jazz musician, composer, poet, and Shinshu Buddhist priest. He was one of the first members of the Association for the Advancement of Creative Musicians and a member of the Art Ensemble of Chicago.

== Biography ==
=== Early life ===
He was born in Pine Bluff, Arkansas, United States. Jarman grew up in Chicago, Illinois. At DuSable High School, he studied drums with Walter Dyett, switching to saxophone and clarinet when he joined the United States Army after graduation. During his time there, he was part of the 11th Airborne Division Band for a year.

=== The AACM and his solo band ===
After he was discharged from the Army in 1958, Jarman attended Wilson Junior College, where he met bassist Malachi Favors Maghostut and saxophonists Roscoe Mitchell, Henry Threadgill, and Anthony Braxton. These men would often perform long jam sessions at the suggestion of their professor, Richard Wang (now with Illinois University). Mitchell introduced Jarman to pianist Muhal Richard Abrams, and Jarman, Mitchell, and Maghostut joined Abrams' Experimental Band, a private, non-performing ensemble, when that group was founded in 1961. The same group of musicians continued to play together in a variety of configurations, and went on to found the Association for the Advancement of Creative Musicians (AACM) in 1965, along with Fred Anderson and Phil Cohran.

Jarman's solo recording career began at this time, with two releases on the Delmark label which included material, such as spoken word and "little instruments", that would later characterize the sound of the Art Ensemble. The band he fronted and used during these recordings between 1966 and 1968, included Fred Anderson (tenor sax), Billy Brimfield (trumpet), Charles Clark (bass), Christopher Gaddy (piano) and Thurman Barker (drums). However, in 1969, Clark and Gaddy both died and Jarman disbanded his group.

=== The Art Ensemble of Chicago and Equal Interest ===
Shortly after his bandmates Clark and Gaddy died in 1969, Jarman joined Mitchell, Maghostut and Lester Bowie (trumpet) in the Roscoe Mitchell Art Ensemble in 1967; the group would be later rounded out with the addition of Don Moye on drums. This band eventually became known as the Art Ensemble of Chicago (AECO). The group was known for being costumed on stage for different reasons; Jarman wore facepaint and has mentioned that it "was sort of the shamanistic image coming from various cultures." The group moved to Paris in 1969, and lived there for many years in a commune that included Steve McCall, the drummer who went on to form the jazz trio Air, with Threadgill and bassist Fred Hopkins. Moving back to Chicago in the 1970s, Jarman lived in a musicians' building in Hyde Park, in Chicago, with Malachi Favors as his roommate. In 1983, he moved to Brooklyn, New York from Chicago and lived there until his death.

Jarman stayed with the Ensemble until 1993, when he left the group to focus on his spiritual practice, "a cleansing process" as he stated. The move was not announced at first, leading fans to speculate about Jarman's health when he did not appear on stage for an AECO Thanksgiving weekend show at the Knitting Factory in 1994. He did not have much to do with music until 1996 when, in January, he recorded two CDs, The Scott Fields Ensembles' 48 Motives and the concert, duo CD Connecting Spirits with Marilyn Crispell, which Fields produced. Later in the year, his friend and fellow AACM peer Leroy Jenkins asked him to join a trio with him and Myra Melford in Chicago, which would eventually be called Equal Interest. Looking back on those three years without music, Jarman commented that "I didn't realize it, but it actually depressed me in many ways." He was then commissioned to write a chamber orchestra piece, which led him to the realization of how to incorporate his Buddhist teachings into his music. Jarman returned to the AECO in January 2003.

Along with the saxophone and clarinet, Jarman also played (and recorded on) nearly every member of the woodwind family, as well as a wide variety of percussion instruments. Aside from his work with relatively traditional jazz line-ups, he also composed for larger orchestras and created multimedia pieces for musicians and dancers.

=== Spirituality ===
Jarman was most widely known for his musical accomplishments, but he was also involved in the practice of Zen Buddhism and aikido. He began his study of aikido in the early 1970s in the Hyde Park neighborhood of Chicago. He began studying Zen Buddhism in 1990 and visited various monasteries in Eastern Asia, including Higashi Honganji Honzon in Kyoto, Japan. A few years later, he opened his own aikido dojo/zendo, Jikishinkan ("direct mind training hall"), in Brooklyn, New York. He was latterly a Jodo Shinshu priest, and held a rank of godan (fifth degree black belt) in aikido.

Joseph Jarman died of respiratory failure at the Lillian Booth Actors Home in Englewood, New Jersey on January 9, 2019, as announced by the New York chapter of the AACM on their website. He was 81.

== Discography ==
=== As leader/co-leader ===
- 1966 – Song For (Delmark)
- 1968 – As If It Were the Seasons (Delmark)
- 1971 – Together Alone (Delmark) with Anthony Braxton
- 1976 - Sunbound Volume One (AECO)
- 1977 – Egwu-Anwu (Sun Song) (India Navigation) with Don Moye
- 1979 – The Magic Triangle (Black Saint) with Don Pullen & Don Moye
- 1979 – Black Paladins (Black Saint) with Don Moye & Johnny Dyani
- 1981 – Earth Passage - Density (Black Saint) with Don Moye, Craig Harris & Rafael Garrett
- 1983 – Inheritance (Four Star, 1991) with Geri Allen, Fred Hopkins and Don Moye
- 1991 – Calypso's Smile (AECO) with Don Moye
- 1996 – Connecting Spirits (Music & Arts) with Marilyn Crispell
- 1996 – Pachinko Dream Track 10 (Music & Arts)
- 1997 – Out of the Mist (Ocean) with Leroy Jenkins
- 1997 – Return of the Lost Tribe (Delmark) as Bright Moments: with Kalaparusha Maurice McIntyre, Kahil El'Zabar, Malachi Favors and Steve Colson
- 1997 – Equal Interest (OmniTone) as Equal Interest: with Leroy Jenkins and Myra Melford
- 2002 – Lifetime Vision Orchestra: Vision Festival 2002 (Jyuku Sound)

With the Art Ensemble of Chicago

Title	Year	Label
Numbers 1 & 2 – Lester Bowie	1967	Nessa
Early Combinations - Art Ensemble	1967	Nessa
A Jackson in Your House	1969	BYG Actuel
Tutankhamun	1969	Freedom
The Spiritual	1969	Freedom
People in Sorrow	1969	Nessa
Message to Our Folks	1969	BYG-Actuel
Reese and the Smooth Ones	1969	BYG-Actuel
Eda Wobu	1969	JMY
Certain Blacks	1970	America
Go Home	1970	Galloway
Chi-Congo	1970	Paula
Les Stances a Sophie	1970	Nessa
Live in Paris	1970	Freedom
Art Ensemble of Chicago with Fontella Bass	1970	America
Phase One	1971	America
Live at Mandell Hall	1972	Delmark
Bap-Tizum	1972	Atlantic
Fanfare for the Warriors	1973	Atlantic
Kabalaba	1974	AECO
Nice Guys	1978	ECM
Live in Berlin	1979	West Wind
Full Force	1980	ECM
Urban Bushmen	1980	ECM
Among the People	1980	Praxis
The Complete Live in Japan	1984	DIW
The Third Decade	1984	ECM
Naked	1986	DIW
Ancient to the Future	1987	DIW
The Alternate Express	1989	DIW
Art Ensemble of Soweto	1990	DIW
America - South Africa	1990	DIW
Thelonious Sphere Monk with Cecil Taylor	1990	DIW
Dreaming of the Masters Suite	1990	DIW
Live at the 6th Tokyo Music Joy	1991	DIW
Fundamental Destiny with Don Pullen	1991	AECO
Salutes the Chicago Blues Tradition	1993	AECO
Reunion	2003	Around Jazz/Il Manifesto
The Meeting	2003	Pi
Sirius Calling	2004	Pi
Non-Cognitive Aspects of the City	2006	Pi

=== As sideman ===
With Anthony Braxton

- For Trio (Arista, 1978)

With Jerome Cooper

- Outer and Interactions (About Time, 1988)

With Alan Silva

- Seasons (BYG, 1971)
