= Thelonious Sphere Monk: Dreaming of the Masters Series Vol. 2 =

Thelonious Sphere Monk

Studio album by Art Ensemble of Chicago
- Released: 1991
- Recorded: January 16 – March 11, 1990
- Genre: Jazz
- Length: 61:56
- Label: DIW
- Producer: Art Ensemble of Chicago

Art Ensemble of Chicago chronology
America - South Africa (1991)	Thelonious Sphere Monk (1991)	Dreaming of the Masters Suite (1991)

Thelonious Sphere Monk: Dreaming of the Masters Series Vol. 2 is an album by the Art Ensemble of Chicago and Cecil Taylor released on the Japanese DIW label. It features performances by Lester Bowie, Joseph Jarman, Roscoe Mitchell, Malachi Favors Maghostut and Don Moye with Cecil Taylor guesting on piano, vocals and percussion.

== Reception ==
Professional ratings
Review scores
Source	Rating
AllMusic	1.5/5 stars
The Penguin Guide to Jazz	3/4 stars
The Rolling Stone Jazz & Blues Album Guide	4/5 stars
The Virgin Encyclopedia of Jazz	4/5 stars

The AllMusic review by Scott Yanow describes the album as "more significant historically than it is musically" due to a mismatch between Taylor's style and the Art Ensemble's.

== Track listing ==
1. "Dreaming of the Masters" (Jarman) - 0:57
2. "Intro to Fifteen" (Art Ensemble of Chicago, Taylor) - 18:25
3. "Excerpt from Fifteen Part 3A" (Art Ensemble of Chicago, Taylor) - 10:51
4. "'Round Midnight" (Monk) - 15:23
5. "Caseworks" (Art Ensemble of Chicago, Taylor) - 8:22
6. "Nutty" (Monk) - 7:27
7. "Dreaming of the Masters" (Jarman) - 0:52

- Recorded January 16–19 & 31, February 3 and March 10–11, 1990 at Systems Two Studios, Brooklyn, NY

== Personnel ==
- Lester Bowie: trumpet, flugelhorn
- Malachi Favors Maghostut: bass, percussion
- Joseph Jarman: saxophones, clarinets, percussion
- Roscoe Mitchell: saxophones, clarinets, flute, percussion
- Don Moye: percussion
- Cecil Taylor: piano, vocals, percussion
