= Live in Paris (Art Ensemble of Chicago album) =

Live album by Art Ensemble of Chicago
- Released: 1974
- Recorded: 13 August 1970
- Venue: Paris, France
- Genre: Jazz
- Length: 96:03
- Label: BYG Actuel Japan
- Producer: Jean Luc Young

Art Ensemble of Chicago chronology
Les Stances a Sophie (1970)	Live in Paris (1974)	Art Ensemble of Chicago with Fontella Bass (1970)

Alternative Cover

Live in Paris is a double live album by the Art Ensemble of Chicago recorded in Paris and first released on the BYG Actuel label in Japan as two separate volumes ('Live Part 1' and 'Live Part 2') in 1974. It was issued on CD by Charly Records under the title 'Live In Paris' presumably to avoid confusion with the Delmark 'Live At Mandel Hall' album (issued on CD under the title 'Live'), and then later issued in the US, with the same artwork and design, by Fuel 2000 Records in the US. It features performances by Lester Bowie, Joseph Jarman, Roscoe Mitchell, Malachi Favors Maghostut, Fontella Bass and Don Moye. Despite reissues identifying it as "Live In Paris" and claiming a date of 5 October 1969, it was actually a radio broadcast from performances in Chateauvailon on 13 August 1970.

== Reception ==
The Allmusic review by Thom Jurek states "This is the finest live recording by the Art Ensemble, and documents the first tour of a legendary band that created new standards not only for improvisation but for performance as well".

Professional ratings
Review scores
Source	Rating
Allmusic	5/5 stars
The Penguin Guide to Jazz Recordings	3/4 stars

== Track listing ==
1. "Oh, Strange" (Bowie, Jarman) – 49:24
1. "Bon Voyage" (Bowie) – 46:39

== Personnel ==
- Lester Bowie: trumpet, percussion instruments
- Malachi Favors Maghostut: bass, percussion instruments, vocals
- Joseph Jarman: saxophones, clarinets, percussion instruments
- Roscoe Mitchell: saxophones, clarinets, flute, percussion instruments
- Fontella Bass: vocals (on #2 only)
- Don Moye: drums, percussion (on #2 only)
