= Go Home (album) =

Studio album by Art Ensemble of Chicago
- Released: 1973
- Recorded: March–April, 1970
- Studio: Paris, France
- Genre: Jazz
- Length: 33:38
- Label: Galloway

Art Ensemble of Chicago chronology
Certain Blacks (1970)	Go Home (1973)	Chi-Congo (1970)

Go Home is a 1970 album by the Art Ensemble of Chicago recorded in Paris for the French Galloway label - first released in 1973. It features performances by Lester Bowie, Joseph Jarman, Roscoe Mitchell and Malachi Favors Maghostut along with Fontella Bass, Ivan Julien, Bernard Vitet, Ambrose Jackson, Jean Louis Chautemps, Alain Matot, Ventosa, Kenneth Terroade, Raymond Katarzinsky and several unidentified musicians.

== Reception ==
Professional ratings
Review scores
Source	Rating
AllMusic	4.5/5 stars

The AllMusic review of the CD reissue combining the album with Chi-Congo stated "Go Home is an adventurous (even for this group), 1970 session that encompasses droning, atmospheric introductions and interludes, rollicking old-timey swing, splattery avant-garde honk-and-clatter that includes an extended interlude of what sounds like junkyard percussion, a quite beautiful and atmospheric piece including vocals by AEOC trumpeter Lester Bowie's wife, Fontella Bass, and the side-long, Stravinsky-esque "Dance," which features eight additional horn players and a string section. Crisply recorded, it's a showcase for many facets of the Art Ensemble's music, and a major work in their discography".

== Track listing ==
All compositions by the Art Ensemble of Chicago

1. "Hello Chi" - 2:54
2. "From Bengali" - 3:51
3. "From St.Louis" - 2:30
4. "Fly With Honey Bee" - 6:23
5. "Hello Chi" - 2:38
6. "Dance" - 15:22

- Recorded March & April, 1970 at Studio Ossian, Paris

== Personnel ==
- Lester Bowie: trumpet
- Ivan Jullien: trumpet
- Bernard Vitet: trumpet
- Ambrose Jackson: trumpet
- Roscoe Mitchell: alto saxophone, flute
- Joseph Jarman: alto saxophone, flute
- Jean-Louis Chautemps: tenor saxophone
- Alain Matot: alto saxophone
- Ventosa: alto saxophone
- Kenneth Terroade: tenor saxophone
- Raymond Katarzinsky: trombone
- Malachi Favors: bass
- Fontella Bass: vocal
