= Nice Guys (album) =

Studio album by the Art Ensemble of Chicago
- Released: 1979
- Recorded: May 1978
- Studio: Tonstudio Bauer; Ludwigsburg, West Germany
- Genre: Jazz
- Length: 44:35
- Label: ECM 1126
- Producer: Manfred Eicher

Art Ensemble of Chicago chronology
Kabalaba (1974)	Nice Guys (1979)	Live in Berlin (1978)

Nice Guys is an album by the Art Ensemble of Chicago, recorded in May 1978 and released on ECM the following year—their debut for the label. The quintet features trumpeter Lester Bowie, saxophonists Joseph Jarman and Roscoe Mitchell and rhythm section Malachi Favors Maghostut and Famoudou Don Moye.

== Reception ==
Professional ratings
Review scores
Source	Rating
AllMusic	4.5/5 stars
The Penguin Guide to Jazz	3/4 stars
Pitchfork	9.5/10
The Rolling Stone Jazz Record Guide	4/5 stars
DownBeat	4.5/5 stars

The AllMusic review by Al Campbell noted that "Nice Guys was the first Art Ensemble of Chicago album released after a five-year recording hiatus and the group's first for the ECM label. During those five years, the Art Ensemble toured Europe and continued to expand its compositional, improvisational, and theatrical jazz fundamentals, captured abundantly on Nice Guys... the album reveals how the AEC managed to turn individual compositions into a fully realized, surprisingly accessible, avant-garde group collective."

DownBeat critic Art Lange writes that Nice Guys, while not the Art Ensemble's best album, "is possibly their most representative, a variegated showcase illustrating much of what they do best."

The Penguin Guide to Jazz awarded the album 3 stars out of 4, stating that "much of the music seems almost formulaic, the improvisation limited".

== Track listing ==
1. "Ja" (Lester Bowie) – 8:43
2. "Nice Guys" (Roscoe Mitchell) – 1:45
3. "Folkus" (Don Moye) – 11:03
4. "597–59" (Joseph Jarman) – 6:46
5. "CYP" (Mitchell) – 4:53
6. "Dreaming of the Master" (Jarman) – 11:40

== Personnel ==
=== Art Ensemble of Chicago ===
- Lester Bowie – trumpet, celeste, bass drum
- Joseph Jarman – saxophones, clarinets, percussion, vocal
- Roscoe Mitchell – saxophones, clarinets, flute, percussion
- Malachi Favors Maghostut – bass, percussion, melodica
- Famoudou Don Moye – drums, percussion, vocal
