= Urban Magic =

Live album by Art Ensemble of Chicago
- Released: 2003
- Recorded: June 4, 1997
- Genre: Jazz
- Label: Musica Jazz

Art Ensemble of Chicago chronology
Coming Home Jamaica (1996)	Urban Magic (2003)	Tribute to Lester (2003)

Urban Magic is a live album recorded on 4 June 1997 in Laroche-sur-Yon, France by the Art Ensemble of Chicago and originally released with the March 2003 issue of the Italian magazine Musica Jazz. It features performances by Lester Bowie, Roscoe Mitchell, Malachi Favors Maghostut and Don Moye and would be the group's last release featuring Bowie who died in 1999.

== Track listing ==
1. "Urban Magic" (Don Moye) - 13:05
2. "Mama Wants You" (Malachi Favors) - 10:30
3. "Dancer" (Don Moye) - 3:32
4. "Chant" (Roscoe Mitchell) - 12:40
5. "Villa Tiamo" (Lester Bowie) - 3:15
6. "Horn Web" (Roscoe Mitchell) - 6:05
7. "Odwalla" (Roscoe Mitchell) - 3:56
8. "Strawberry Mango" (Art Ensemble of Chicago) - 5:22

- Recorded at Laroche-sur-Yon, France on June 4, 1997

== Personnel ==
- Lester Bowie: trumpet, flugelhorn
- Roscoe Mitchell: soprano saxophone, alto saxophone, tenor saxophone, bamboo saxophone, flute, bamboo flute, piccolo, percussion
- Malachi Favors Maghostut: bass, percussion
- Don Moye: drums, congas, gong, percussion
