= Among the People =

Live album by Art Ensemble of Chicago
- Released: 1981
- Recorded: August 1980
- Venue: Milan, Italy
- Genre: Jazz
- Length: 36:45
- Label: Praxis
- Producer: Kostas Yiannoulopoulos

Art Ensemble of Chicago chronology
Urban Bushmen (1980)	Among the People (1981)	The Complete Live in Japan (1988)

Live in Milano Cover

Among the People is a live album by the Art Ensemble of Chicago originally released in 1981 as an LP on the Greek Praxis label, and reissued on CD as Live in Milano on the Golden Years of New Jazz label in 2001.

== Reception ==
Professional ratings
Review scores
Source	Rating
AllMusic	2/5 stars

In his review for AllMusic, François Couture stated "This short (37 minutes) live set of the Art Ensemble of Chicago was recorded in August 1980, while the group was enjoying a gust of popularity, and released by the label Praxis under the title Among the People. Kostas Yiannoulopoulos was not authorized to publish it, so it came out in bootleg form with track titles and credits all messed up ... As unessential Live in Milano is, it still presents one hell of a performance. Lester Bowie and Malachi Favors are in particularly good shape, everyone is good-humored and playful". In JazzTimes, John Litweiler said "This concert was good, though not one of their best. It was poorly recorded, and the horn solos were badly miked, so turn up the volume when you listen". On All About Jazz, Glenn Astarita commented "this newly reissued recording should please the artists' longtime admirers. Recommended"

== Track listing ==
1. "Tutankhamun" (Malachi Favors) - 18:32 (mistitled "Among the People" on original LP)
2. "Illinstrun" (Don Moye, Malachi Favors) - 7:51 (mistitled "Shango King" on original LP)
3. "A Jackson in Your House" (Roscoe Mitchell) - 10:24 (mistitled "Choosing a Cracker" on original LP)

== Personnel ==
- Lester Bowie: trumpet, bass drum
- Malachi Favors Maghostut: bass, percussion instruments
- Joseph Jarman: saxophones, clarinets, percussion instruments
- Roscoe Mitchell: saxophones, clarinets, flute, percussion instruments
- Don Moye: drums, percussion
