= Urban Bushmen =

Live album by Art Ensemble of Chicago
- Released: March 1982
- Recorded: May 5–6, 1980
- Venue: Amerika Haus; Munich, W. Germany
- Genre: Jazz
- Length: 92:46
- Label: ECM; ECM 1211/12
- Producer: Manfred Eicher

Art Ensemble of Chicago chronology
Full Force (1980)	Urban Bushmen (1982)	Among the People (1981)

Urban Bushmen is a live double album by the Art Ensemble of Chicago recorded at the Amerika Haus in Munich over two days in May 1980 and released on ECM in March 1982. The quintet comprises trumpeter Lester Bowie, saxophonists Joseph Jarman and Roscoe Mitchell and rhythm section Malachi Favors Maghostut and Don Moye.

== Reception ==
Professional ratings
Review scores
Source	Rating
AllMusic	4.5/5 stars
The Rolling Stone Jazz Record Guide	4/5 stars
The Penguin Guide to Jazz Recordings	3.5/4 stars

Writing for AllMusic, critic Stephen Cook stated, "Urban Bushmen not only provides an excellent summation of the Art Ensemble of Chicago's work since 1966, but also substantiates the group's reputation for putting on intense and inspired shows."

== Track listing ==
1. "Promenade: Cote Bamako I" (Don Moye) - 4:11
2. "Bush Magic" (Malachi Favors, Moye) - 5:05
3. "Urban Magic" (Art Ensemble of Chicago) - 15:45
4. "Sun Precondition Two/Theme for Sco" (Moye/Joseph Jarman) - 21:53
5. "New York Is Full of Lonely People" (Lester Bowie) - 7:37
6. "Ancestral Meditation" (Art Ensemble of Chicago) - 6:56
7. "Uncle" (Roscoe Mitchell) - 17:29
8. "Peter and Judith" (Mitchell) - 2:39
9. "Promenade: Cote Bamako II" (Moye) - 5:57
10. "Odwalla/Theme" (Mitchell) - 5:14

== Personnel ==
=== The Art Ensemble of Chicago ===
- Lester Bowie – trumpet, bass drum, long horn, vocals
- Joseph Jarman – saxophones, vocals, clarinets, bassoon, flutes, percussion
- Roscoe Mitchell – saxophones, flute, percussion, clarinet, vocals
- Malachi Favors Maghostut – bass, percussion, melodica, vocals
- Don Moye – sun percussion, vocals
