= Art Ensemble of Chicago with Fontella Bass =

Studio album by Art Ensemble of Chicago
- Released: 1971
- Recorded: August 1970
- Studio: Paris, France
- Genre: Jazz
- Label: America
- Producer: Pierre Berjot

Art Ensemble of Chicago chronology
Live in Paris (1970)	Art Ensemble of Chicago with Fontella Bass (1971)	Phase One (1970)

CD Reissue Cover

Art Ensemble of Chicago with Fontella Bass is a 1970 album by the Art Ensemble of Chicago recorded in Paris and released on the America label in 1971 then reissued in the US on Prestige Records the following year. It features performances by Lester Bowie, Joseph Jarman, Roscoe Mitchell, Malachi Favors Maghostut, Fontella Bass, and Don Moye.

== Critical reception ==
Professional ratings
Review scores
Source	Rating
AllMusic	4.5/5 stars
The Rolling Stone Jazz Record Guide	5/5 stars
The Penguin Guide to Jazz Recordings	2.5/4 stars

Robert Palmer of Rolling Stone wrote: "The music works very much like a film, in sequences. Certain instruments and ideas carry over from one sequence to another, but something new is always being added as something else is subtracted. There are successions of episodes, of colours, meshes of tones and ideas, washes of sound. There is no soloing as such. Each player is a virtuoso on his main horns, but the virtuosity is channeled into a true ensemble approach." Thom Jurek of AllMusic praised the album, saying, "Bass, an R&B and gospel singer by trade and Lester Bowie's wife at the time, adds a wonderful theatrical and sonic dimension to the Art Ensemble's creative juggernaut... This set stands the test of time beautifully".

== Track listing ==
1. "How Strange/Ole Jed" (Art Ensemble of Chicago) - 21:57
2. "Horn Web" (Roscoe Mitchell) - 19:39

== Personnel ==
- Lester Bowie: trumpet, percussion instruments
- Malachi Favors Maghostut: bass, percussion instruments, vocals
- Joseph Jarman: saxophones, clarinets, percussion instruments
- Roscoe Mitchell: saxophones, clarinets, flute, percussion instruments
- Fontella Bass: vocals, piano
- Don Moye: drums, percussion
