= Fundamental Destiny =

Live album by Art Ensemble of Chicago

Live album by Art Ensemble of Chicago & Don Pullen
- Released: 2007
- Recorded: June 1, 1991
- Genre: Jazz
- Label: AECO

Art Ensemble of Chicago chronology
Live at the 6th Tokyo Music Joy (1991)	Fundamental Destiny (2007)	Salutes the Chicago Blues Tradition (1993)

Fundamental Destiny is a live album by the Art Ensemble of Chicago and Don Pullen recorded in June 1991 in Frankfurt, Germany and released in 2007 on the group's AECO label. It features performances by Lester Bowie, Joseph Jarman, Roscoe Mitchell, Malachi Favors Maghostut, and Don Moye with Don Pullen joining on piano.

== Reception ==
The Allmusic review by Scott Yanow states that "This live recording, while not flawless, has enough bright moments to make it easily recommended to Art Ensemble collectors".

Professional ratings
Review scores
Source	Rating
Allmusic	4/5 stars

== Track listing ==
1. "People in Sorrow" (Bowie, Favors, Jarman, Mitchell) - 19:47
2. "Song For Atala" (Mitchell) - 16:48
3. "Fundamental Destiny" (Jarman) - 11:56
4. "Odwalla/The Theme" (Mitchell) - 3:35

- Recorded live at Frankfurt Jazz Festival, Germany on June 1, 1991

== Personnel ==
- Lester Bowie: trumpet, percussion
- Malachi Favors Maghostut: bass, percussion
- Roscoe Mitchell: soprano saxophone, alto saxophone, tenor saxophone, baritone saxophone, clarinet, flute, percussion
- Joseph Jarman: soprano saxophone, alto saxophone, tenor saxophone, synthesizer, clarinet, flute, percussion
- Famoudou Don Moye: drums, percussion
- Don Pullen: piano
