= Dreaming of the Masters Suite =

Studio album by Art Ensemble of Chicago
- Released: 1991
- Recorded: January 12–March 24, 1990
- Genre: Jazz
- Length: 46:46
- Label: DIW
- Producer: Art Ensemble of Chicago

Art Ensemble of Chicago chronology
Thelonious Sphere Monk (1991)	Dreaming of the Masters Suite (1991)	Live at the 6th Tokyo Music Joy (1991)

Dreaming of the Masters Suite: Music Inspired by and Dedicated to John Coltrane is an album by the Art Ensemble of Chicago released on the Japanese DIW label. It features performances by Lester Bowie, Joseph Jarman, Roscoe Mitchell, Malachi Favors Maghostut and Don Moye.

== Reception ==
The Allmusic review by Brian Olewnick states "The Coltrane songs are played competently but without either the ecstatic abandon of their creator, or with the investigatory intelligence and wit of the the [sic] Art Ensemble at its peak... The remaining compositions walk a similarly safe line; they're pleasant enough and well-played but don't have the bite or passion that admirers of this superb ensemble had come to expect".

Professional ratings
Review scores
Source	Rating
Allmusic	2.5/5 stars

== Track listing ==
1. "Dreaming of the Masters" (Jarman) 1:04
2. "Call of the Captain" (Art Ensemble of Chicago) - 2:20
3. "Impressions" (Coltrane) - 6:47
4. "Colors Too" (Art Ensemble of Chicago) - 6:13
5. "Naima" (Coltrane) 5:37
6. "Spiritual" (Coltrane) - 2:46
7. "Ohnedaruth" (Art Ensemble of Chicago) - 7:02
8. "Go Ahead" (Art Ensemble of Chicago) - 7:37
9. "Song for Atala" (Mitchell) - 6:56
10. "Dreaming of the Masters" (Jarman) - 0:48
  - Recorded on January 12 & 14 and March 11, 17, 18, 21 & 24, 1990 at Systems Two Studios, Brooklyn, New York.

== Personnel ==
- Lester Bowie – trumpet, flugelhorn
- Malachi Favors Maghostut – bass, percussion
- Joseph Jarman – saxophones, clarinets, percussion
- Roscoe Mitchell – saxophones, clarinets, flute, percussion
- Don Moye – Sun percussion
