= Earth Passage – Density =

Earth Passage - Density

Studio album by Joseph Jarman & Don Moye
- Released: 1981
- Recorded: February 16 & 17, 1981
- Genre: Jazz
- Length: 46:17
- Label: Black Saint
- Producer: Giovanni Bonandrini

Joseph Jarman chronology
Black Paladins (1979)	Earth Passage - Density (1981)	Calypso's Smile (1991)

Earth Passage – Density is an album by American jazz saxophonist Joseph Jarman and percussionist Don Moye featuring Craig Harris and Rafael Garrett, recorded in 1981 for the Italian Black Saint label.

== Reception ==
The AllMusic review by Scott Yanow stated: "Four advanced improvisers team up to play complex and rather open-ended originals during this adventurous set".

Professional ratings
Review scores
Source	Rating
AllMusic	4/5 stars
The Rolling Stone Jazz Record Guide	3/5 stars

== Track listing ==
All compositions by Joseph Jarman except as indicated

1. "Zulu Village: Hommage/Summoning the Elders/Children's Sun Celebration" (Joseph Jarman, Don Moye) - 13:02
2. "Happiness Is" - 10:09
3. "Jawara" (Craig Harris) - 12:09
4. "Sun Spots" - 10:57
  - Recorded at Barigozzi Studio in Milano, Italy on February 16 & 17, 1981

== Personnel ==
- Joseph Jarman - soprano saxophone, alto saxophone, tenor saxophone, C melody saxophone, piccolo, flute, bamboo flute, alto clarinet, bass clarinet
- Famoudou Don Moye - Sun percussion
- Craig Harris - trombone, bamboo flute, didgeridoo, cowbell, voice
- Rafael Garrett - bass, bamboo flute, conch shell, panpipes
