= The Magic Triangle =

Studio album by Don Pullen, Joseph Jarman & Don Moye
- Released: 1979
- Recorded: July 24–26, 1979
- Genre: Jazz
- Length: 51:33
- Label: Black Saint

Don Pullen chronology
Milano Strut (1978)	The Magic Triangle (1979)	All That Funk (1979)

Joseph Jarman chronology
Egwu-Anwo (1977)	The Magic Triangle (1979)	Black Paladins (1979)

The Magic Triangle is an album by American jazz pianist Don Pullen, saxophonist Joseph Jarman and drummer Don Moye, recorded in 1979 for the Italian Black Saint label.

== Reception ==
The AllMusic review by Scott Yanow stated: "The four group originals, although sometimes using themes, are quite spontaneous and most noteworthy for the interplay between the unpredictable Jarman and the powerful pianist. Mostly for very open-eared listeners".

Professional ratings
Review scores
Source	Rating
AllMusic	4.5/5 stars
The Penguin Guide to Jazz Recordings	3/4 stars

== Track listing ==
All compositions by Don Pullen except as indicated

1. "Lonely Child" (Joseph Jarman) – 14:34
2. "J.F.M. - 3 Way Blues" (Don Moye) – 5:41
3. "Hippy Dippy" – 9:23
4. "What Was Ain't" – 10:48

- Recorded at Barigozzi Studio in Milano, Italy, on July 24–26, 1979

== Personnel ==
- Don Pullen – piano, vocals
- Joseph Jarman – flute, alto flute, piccolo, tenor saxophone, alto saxophone, clarinet
- Famoudou Don Moye – drums, congas
