= Salutes the Chicago Blues Tradition =

Live album by Art Ensemble of Chicago
- Released: 1993
- Recorded: July 7, 1993
- Genre: Jazz
- Label: AECO

Art Ensemble of Chicago chronology
Fundamental Destiny (2005)	Salutes the Chicago Blues Tradition (1993)	Coming Home Jamaica (1996)

Salutes the Chicago Blues Tradition is a live album recorded on 7 July 1993 in Geneva, Switzerland by the Art Ensemble of Chicago and released on their own AECO label. It features performances by Lester Bowie, Joseph Jarman, Roscoe Mitchell, Malachi Favors and Don Moye with Chicago Beau, Amina Claudine Myers, Frank Lacy, James Carter and Herb Walker.

== Track listing ==
Disc One

1. "Erika/Carefree" (Joseph Jarman/Roscoe Mitchell) – 22:38
2. "Blues For Zazen" (Joseph Jarman) – 21:22
3. "Tin Pan Alley" (Lincoln T Beauchamp, Jr.) – 12:23

Disc Two

1. "I, The Blues" (Lincoln T Beauchamp, Jr.) – 7:23
2. "Hoochie Coochie Man" (Willie Dixon) – 12:17
3. "Night Time Is The Right Time" (Leroy Carr) – 9:31
4. "Odwalla" (Roscoe Mitchell) – 5:55
5. "Got My Mojo Workin'" (Preston Foster, McKinley Morganfield) – 5:49

- Recorded in Geneva, Switzerland on July 7, 1993

== Personnel ==
- Lester Bowie: trumpet
- Roscoe Mitchell: soprano saxophone, alto saxophone tenor saxophone
- Joseph Jarman: soprano saxophone, alto saxophone
- Malachi Favors Maghostut: bass
- Don Moye: drums, percussion
- Herb Walker: guitar
- Chicago Beau: harmonica, vocals
- Amina Claudine Myers: organ, vocals
- James Carter: tenor saxophone
- Frank Lacy: trombone
