= Tutankhamun (album) =

Studio album by Art Ensemble of Chicago
- Released: 1969
- Recorded: June 26, 1969
- Studio: Polydor Studios (Dames II), Paris, France
- Genre: Jazz
- Label: Freedom; Black Lion Records
- Producer: Alan Bates, Chris Whent

Art Ensemble of Chicago chronology
A Jackson in Your House (1969)	Tutankhamun (1969)	The Spiritual (1969)

Tutankhamun is a 1969 album by the Art Ensemble of Chicago first released on the Freedom label. It features performances by Lester Bowie, Joseph Jarman, Roscoe Mitchell and Malachi Favors Maghostut.

The album was named for Tutankhamun, an Egyptian pharaoh of the 18th dynasty.

== Reception ==
Professional ratings
Review scores
Source	Rating
AllMusic	4/5 stars

The AllMusic review stated "This landmark album is one of the most influential free jazz recordings in the '60s avant-garde canon ... This album is for the jazz aficionado looking to explore new aural vistas. The music on Tutankhamun is more about texture than melody, harmony, or even rhythm and counterpoint. The beauty of this music, however, is that the notes we hear offer a compelling and thought-provoking journey into the possibilities of sound itself".

== Track listing ==
1. "Tutankhamun" (Malachi Favors) - 18:10
2. "The Ninth Room" (Roscoe Mitchell) - 15:35

== Bonus tracks on Black Lion CD reissue ==
1. "Tthinitthedalen Part 1" (Favors, Mitchell) - 4:24
2. "Tthinitthedalen Part 2" (Favors, Mitchell) - 4:54

== Personnel ==
- Lester Bowie: trumpet, percussion instruments
- Malachi Favors Maghostut: bass, percussion instruments, vocals
- Joseph Jarman: saxophones, clarinets, percussion instruments
- Roscoe Mitchell: saxophones, clarinets, flute, percussion instruments
