= Naked (Art Ensemble of Chicago album) =

Studio album by Art Ensemble of Chicago
- Released: 1986
- Recorded: November 25, 1985 – July 27, 1986
- Genre: Jazz
- Length: 48:26
- Label: DIW
- Producer: Art Ensemble of Chicago

Art Ensemble of Chicago chronology
The Third Decade (1984)	Naked (1986)	Ancient to the Future (1987)

Professional ratings
Review scores
Source	Rating
Allmusic	3/5 stars

Naked is a 1986 album by the Art Ensemble of Chicago released on the Japanese DIW label. It features performances by Lester Bowie, Joseph Jarman, Roscoe Mitchell, Malachi Favors Maghostut and Don Moye.

== Reception ==
Allmusic's Stephen Cook describes the album as "appealing without being especially challenging" and "a good introduction to the Art Ensemble of Chicago's vast catalog".

== Track listing ==
1. "Dancer" (Moye) - 2:14
2. "Tobago Tango" (Bowie) - 7:13
3. "Flash 1" (Art Ensemble of Chicago) - 4:21
4. "We Bop" (Bowie) 6:07
5. "Charm No. 10" (Art Ensemble of Chicago) - 3:13
6. "RMR" (Jarman) - 8:04
7. "Galactic Landscape" (Art Ensemble of Chicago) - 8:11
8. "Way Way Down Yonder" (Favors) - 9:03

- Recorded November 25 & 26, 1985 and July 25–27, 1986 in Brooklyn

== Personnel ==
- Lester Bowie: trumpet, fluegelhorn
- Malachi Favors Maghostut: bass, percussion instruments
- Joseph Jarman: saxophones, clarinets, percussion instruments
- Roscoe Mitchell: saxophones, clarinets, flute, percussion instruments
- Don Moye: drums, percussion
