= Lester Bowie =

American jazz trumpeter and composer (1941–1999)

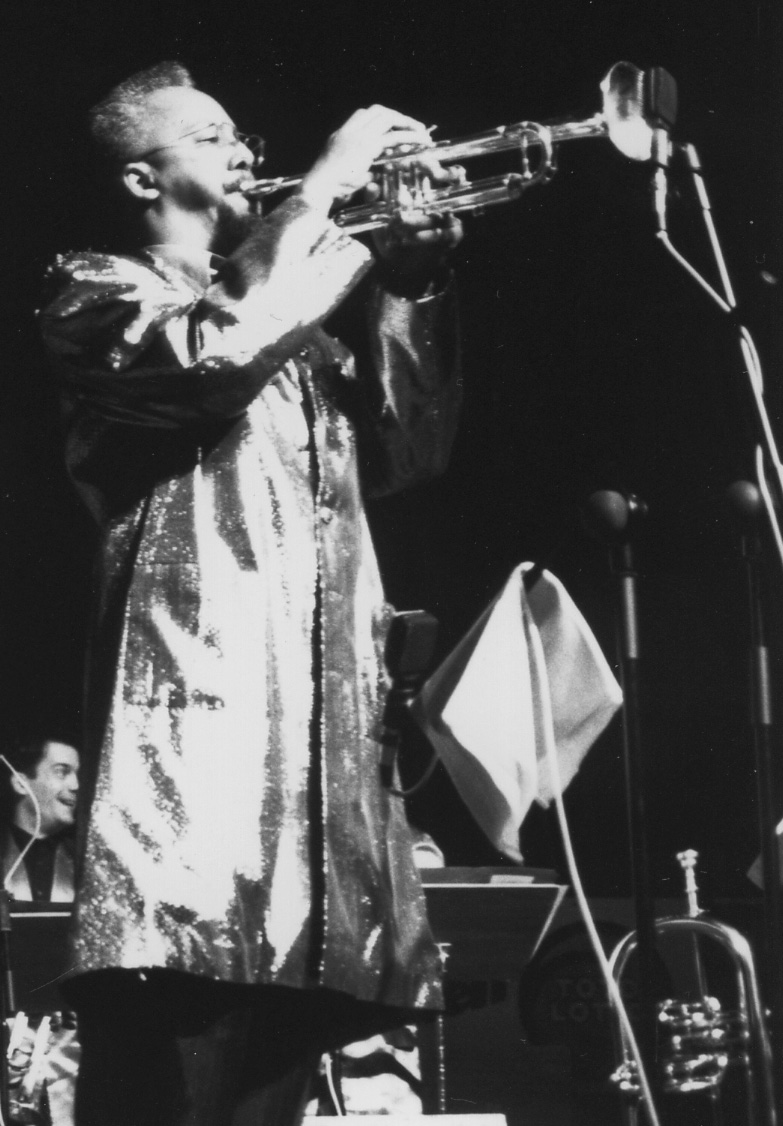
- Bowie performing in the mid-1990s

Background information
- Born: October 11, 1941; Frederick, Maryland, U.S.
- Origin: Chicago, Illinois, U.S.
- Died: November 8, 1999 (aged 58) New York City, U.S.
- Occupations: Musician; composer
- Instruments: Trumpet; flugelhorn; percussion
- Years active: 1965–1999
- Labels: Nessa; Freedom; Actuel; Black Saint; Atlantic; Horo; ECM; DIW; Birdology

Lester Bowie (October 11, 1941 – November 8, 1999) was an American jazz trumpet player and composer. He was a member of the Association for the Advancement of Creative Musicians and co-founded the Art Ensemble of Chicago.

== Biography ==
Born in the historic village of Bartonsville in Frederick County, Maryland, United States, Bowie grew up in St Louis, Missouri. He grew up in a musical family; his father, W. Lester Bowie Sr., was a trained trumpeter who served as a high school band director in St. Louis for thirty years, and was Lester's first music teacher. His brothers, trombonist Joseph Bowie and saxophonist Byron Bowie, also became professional musicians. At the age of five, he started studying the trumpet with his father. He played with blues musicians such as Little Milton and Albert King, and rhythm and blues stars such as Solomon Burke, Joe Tex, and Rufus Thomas. In 1965, he became Fontella Bass's musical director and husband. Together they had four children: Ju'Lene Bowie Coney, Bahnamous Lee Bowie (a keyboardist and record producer who appeared as a featured guest on two Art Ensemble of Chicago recordings, Ancient to the Future (1987) and Coming Home Jamaica (1998)), Neuka Bowie Mitchell, and Larry Stevenson. He was a co-founder of Black Artists Group (BAG) in St. Louis.

In 1966, he moved to Chicago, where he worked as a studio musician, and met Muhal Richard Abrams and Roscoe Mitchell and became a member of the AACM. In 1968, he founded the Art Ensemble of Chicago with Mitchell, Joseph Jarman, and Malachi Favors. In 1969, Bowie and the ensemble relocated to Paris, France, where they performed and recorded extensively over a two-year residency; during this period, his wife Fontella Bass appeared as a featured vocalist on the film soundtrack Les Stances à Sophie (Pathé Marconi/EMI France, 1970), recorded at Pathé Marconi studio, Boulogne, France on August 22, 1970, documented by the Library of Congress Jazz on the Screen database. He remained a member of this group for the rest of his life, and was also a member of Jack DeJohnette's New Directions quartet. He lived and worked in Jamaica and Nigeria, and played and recorded with Fela Kuti. Bowie's onstage appearance, in a white lab coat, with his goatee waxed into two points, was an important part of the Art Ensemble's stage show.

In 1984, he formed Lester Bowie's Brass Fantasy, a brass nonet in which Bowie demonstrated jazz's links to other forms of popular music, a decidedly more populist approach than that of the Art Ensemble. With this group he recorded songs previously associated with Whitney Houston, Michael Jackson, and Marilyn Manson, along with other material. His New York Organ Ensemble featured James Carter and Amina Claudine Myers. In the mid-1980s, he was also part of the jazz supergroup The Leaders, which included tenor saxophonist Chico Freeman, alto saxophonist Arthur Blythe, drummer Famoudou Don Moye, pianist Kirk Lightsey, and bassist Cecil McBee. In 1991, Bowie recorded the opening theme for the eighth and final season of the television series The Cosby Show.

Although seen as part of the avant-garde, Bowie embraced techniques from the whole history of jazz trumpet, filling his music with humorous smears, blats, growls, half-valve effects, and so on. His affinity for reggae and ska is exemplified by his composition "Ska Reggae Hi-Bop", which he performed with the Skatalites on their 1994 Hi-Bop Ska, and also with James Carter on Conversin' with the Elders. He also appeared on the 1994 Red Hot Organization's compilation album, Stolen Moments: Red Hot + Cool. The album, which was produced to raise awareness and funds in support of the AIDS epidemic in relation to the African-American community, was heralded as "Album of the Year" by Time.

In 1993, he played on the David Bowie album Black Tie White Noise, including the song "Looking for Lester", which was named after him. (Lester and David Bowie were not related.)

Bowie took an adventurous and humorous approach to music, and criticized Wynton Marsalis for his conservative approach to jazz tradition.

Bowie died of liver cancer in 1999 at his Clinton Hill, Brooklyn, New York house he shared with second wife Deborah for 20 years. The following year, he was inducted into the DownBeat Jazz Hall of Fame. In 2001, the Art Ensemble of Chicago recorded Tribute to Lester. In 2020, Bowie was featured in a mural painted by Rafael Blanco in his hometown of Frederick, Maryland.

== Discography ==
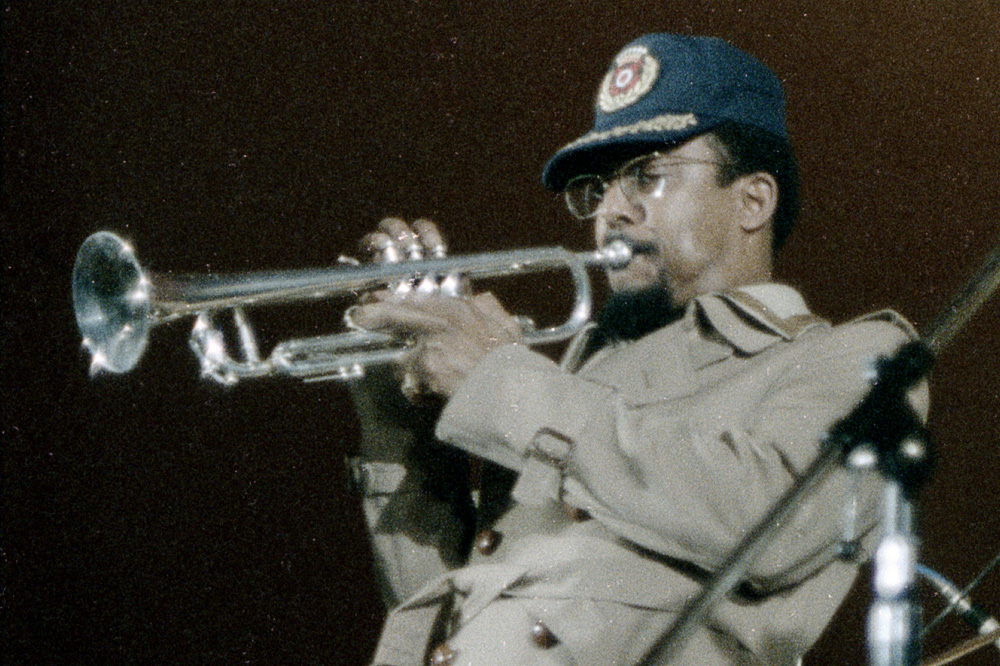
Lester Bowie, New Jazz Festival Moers (Moers Festival), 1978

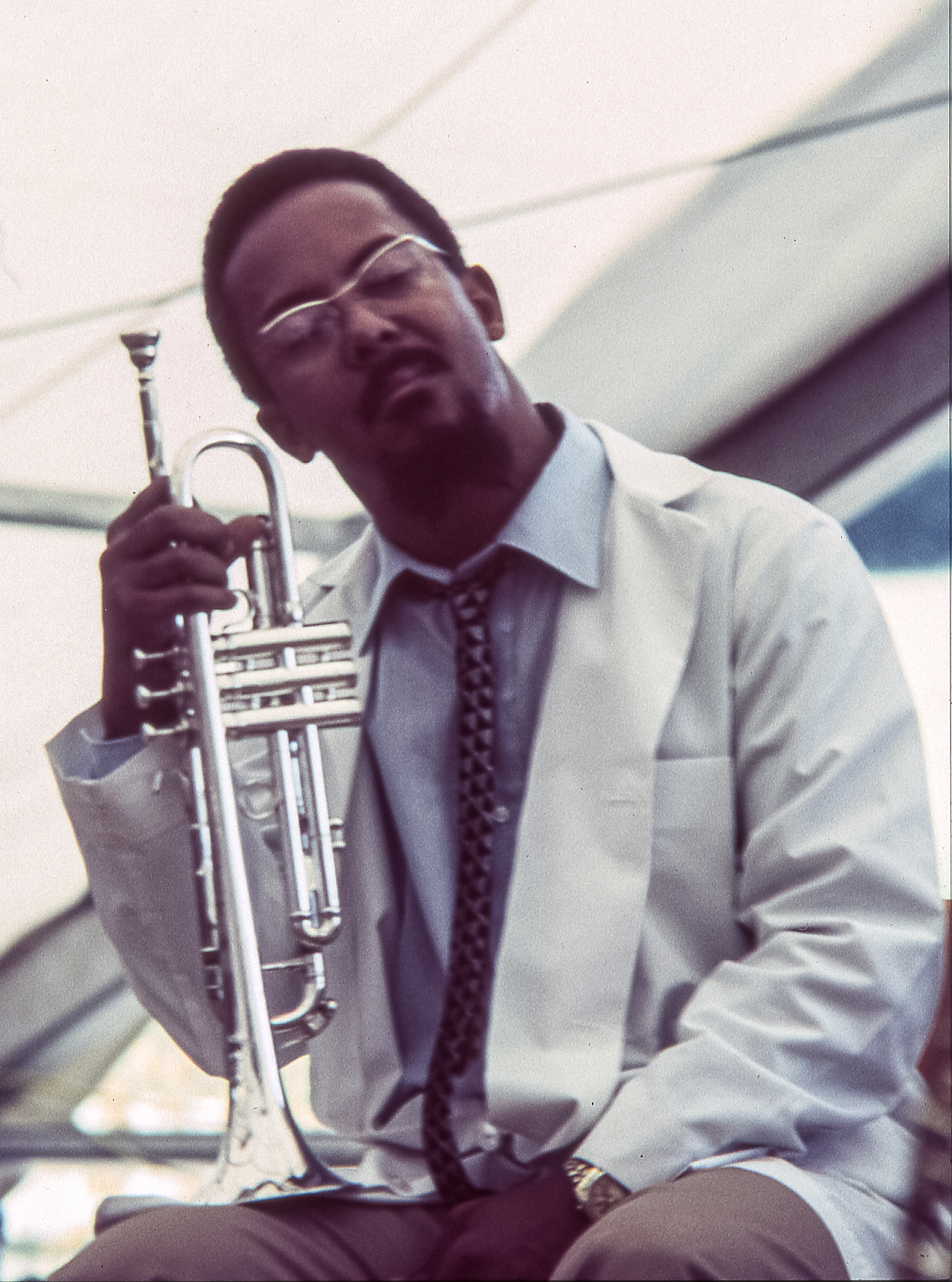
Lester Bowie, with the Art Ensemble of Chicago, Jazz Festival Zeltweg (Spielberg), 1983

=== As leader ===
Title	Year	Label
Numbers 1 & 2	1967	Nessa
Gittin' to Know Y'All (features Bowie conducting the Baden-Baden Free Jazz Orchestra)	1970	MPS
Fast Last!	1974	Muse
Rope-A-Dope	1976	Muse
African Children	1978	Horo
Duet (with Phillip Wilson)	1978	Improvising Artists
The 5th Power	1978	Black Saint
The Great Pretender	1981	ECM
All the Magic	1983	ECM
Bugle Boy Bop (with Charles "Bobo" Shaw)	1983	Muse
Duet (with Nobuyoshi Ino)	1985	Paddle Wheel

=== Lester Bowie's Brass Fantasy ===
Title	Year	Label
I Only Have Eyes for You	1985	ECM
Avant Pop	1986	ECM
Twilight Dreams	1987	Venture
Serious Fun	1989	DIW
My Way	1990	DIW
Live at the 6th Tokyo Music Joy (with the Art Ensemble Of Chicago)	1990	DIW
The Fire This Time	1992	In & Out
The Odyssey Of Funk & Popular Music	1999	Atlantic
When the Spirit Returns	2000 (recorded Oct. 1997)	Birdology

=== Lester Bowie's New York Organ Ensemble ===
Title	Year	Label
The Organizer	1991	DIW
Funky T. Cool T.	1992	DIW

=== With the Art Ensemble of Chicago ===
Title	Year	Label
Old/Quartet - Roscoe Mitchell	1967	Nessa
Numbers 1 & 2 - Lester Bowie	1967	Nessa
Early Combinations - Art Ensemble	1967	Nessa
Congliptious - Roscoe Mitchell	1967	Nessa
A Jackson in Your House	1969	Actuel
Tutankhamun	1969	Freedom
the Spiritual	1969	Freedom
People in Sorrow	1969	Pathe Marconi
Message to Our Folks	1969	Actuel
Reese and the Smooth Ones	1969	Actuel
Eda Wobu	1969	JMY
Certain Blacks	1970	America
Go Home	1970	Galloway
Chi-Congo	1970	Paula
Les Stances a Sophie	1970	America
Live in Paris	1970	Freedom
Art Ensemble of Chicago with Fontella Bass	1970	America
Phase One	1971	America
Live at Mandell Hall	1972	Delmark
Bap-Tizum	1972	Atlantic
Fanfare for the Warriors	1973	Atlantic
Kabalaba	1974	AECO
Nice Guys	1978	ECM
Live in Berlin	1979	West Wind
Full Force	1980	ECM
Urban Bushmen	1980	ECM
Among the People	1980	Praxis
The Complete Live in Japan	1984	DIW
The Third Decade	1984	ECM
Naked	1986	DIW
Ancient to the Future	1987	DIW
The Alternate Express	1989	DIW
Art Ensemble of Soweto	1990	DIW
America - South Africa	1990	DIW
Thelonious Sphere Monk with Cecil Taylor	1990	DIW
Dreaming of the Masters Suite	1990	DIW
Live at the 6th Tokyo Music Joy with Lester Bowie's Brass Fantasy	1991	DIW
Fundamental Destiny with Don Pullen	1991	AECO
Salutes the Chicago Blues Tradition	1993	AECO
Coming Home Jamaica	1996	Atlantic
Urban Magic	1997	Musica Jazz

=== With the Leaders ===
- Mudfoot (Black Hawk), 1986
- Out Here Like This (Black Saint), 1986
- Unforeseen Blessings (Black Saint), 1988
- Slipping and Sliding (Sound Hills), 1994

=== As sideman ===
With David Bowie

- Black Tie White Noise (Savage, 1993)

With James Carter

- Conversin' with the Elders (Atlantic, 1995)

With Jack DeJohnette

- New Directions (ECM, 1978)
- New Directions in Europe (ECM, 1979)
- Zebra (MCA, 1989)

With Brigitte Fontaine

- Comme à la Radio (Saravah, 1971)

With Melvin Jackson

- Funky Skull (Limelight, 1969)

With Fela Kuti

- Stalemate (Afrodisia, 1977)
- No Agreement (Afrodisia, 1977)
- Sorrow Tears and Blood (Kalakuta Records, 1977)
- Fear not for man (Afrodisia, 1977)

With Frank Lowe

- Fresh (Freedom, 1975)

With Jimmy Lyons

- Free Jazz No. 1 (Concert Hall, 1969)
- Other Afternoons (BYG, 1970)

With Roscoe Mitchell

- Sound (Delmark, 1966)

With David Murray

- Live at the Lower Manhattan Ocean Club (India Navigation, 1978)

With Sunny Murray

- Sunshine (BYG, 1969)
- Homage to Africa (BYG, 1969)

With Charles Bobo Shaw

- Under the Sun (Freedom, 1973)
- Streets of St. Louis (Moers Music, 1974)

With Archie Shepp

- Yasmina, a Black Woman (BYG, 1969)
- Blasé (BYG, 1969)
- Pitchin Can (America, 1970)
- Coral Rock (America, 1970)

With Alan Silva

- Seasons (BYG, 1971)

With Wadada Leo Smith

- Divine Love (ECM, 1979)

With others

- Funky Donkey Vol. 1 & 2 (Atavistic) (Luther Thomas & the Human Arts Ensemble)
- Under the Sun (Universal Justice) 1974 (Human Arts Ensemble)
- Funky Donkey 1977 (Circle) (Luther Thomas Creative Ensemble)
- Free to Dance (Black Saint), 1978 (Marcello Melis)
- 6 x 1 = 10 Duos for a New Decade (Circle), 1980 (John Fischer)
- The Razor's Edge/Strangling Me With Your Love (Hannibal, 12"), 1982 (Defunkt)
- The Ritual (Sound Aspects), 1985 (Kahil El'Zabar)
- Meet Danny Wilson (Virgin), 1987 (Danny Wilson)
- Sacred Love (Sound Aspects), 1988 (Kahil El'Zabar)
- Avoid The Funk (Hannibal), 1988 (Defunkt)
- Environ Days (Konnex), 1991 (John Fischer)
- Cum Funky (Enemy), 1994 (Defunkt)
- Hi-Bop Ska, 1994 (Skatalites)
- Stolen Moments: Red Hot + Cool (Impulse!), 1994 (Various Artists) appears on one track with Digable Planets
- Bluesiana Hurricane (Shanachie), 1995 with Rufus Thomas, Bill Doggett, Chuck Rainey, Bobby Watson, Will Calhoun, and Sue Foley
- Buddy Bolden's Rag (Delmark), 1995 (Malachi Thompson & Africa Brass)
- Not Two (Biodro Records), 1995 (Miłość and Lester Bowie)
- No Ways Tired (Nonesuch), 1995 (Fontella Bass)
- Mac's Smokin' Section (McKenzie), 1996 (Mac Gollehon)
- Hello Friend: To Ennis with Love (Verve), 1997 (Bill Cosby)
- My Secret Life (Calliope), 1998 (Sonia Dada)
- Amore Pirata (Il Manifesto), 1998 (Lorenzo Gasperoni Mamud Band feat. Lester Bowie)
- Smokin' Live (McKenzie), 1999 (Mac Gollehon)
- G:MT – Greenwich Mean Time (Island Records), 1999 (Guy Sigsworth)
- Talkin' About Life And Death (Biodro Records), 1999 (Miłość and Lester Bowie)
- Test Pattern (Razor & Tie), 2004 (Sonia Dada)
- Hiroshima (Art Yard), 2007 (The Sun Ra All Stars Band)
- The Ancestors Are Amongst Us (Katalyst, recorded live at Jazzfestival Saafelden August 28, 1987 and released 2010) - with Kahil El'Zabar and the Ritual Trio

== Additional sources ==
- Carles, Philippe; Clergeat, André; Comolli, Jean-Louis (1994). Dictionnaire du Jazz. Paris: R. Laffont. ISBN 978-2221115923.
- Carr, Ian; Fairweather, Digby; Priestley, Brian (1987). Jazz: the Essential Companion. London: Prentice Hall Press. ISBN 978-0135092743.
- Cook, Richard; Morton, Brian (2002). The Penguin Guide to Jazz on CD (6th ed.). Penguin Books. ISBN 978-0140515213.
