= Live in Berlin (Art Ensemble of Chicago album) =

Live album by Art Ensemble of Chicago
- Released: 1991
- Recorded: March 19, 1979
- Genre: Jazz
- Label: West Wind
- Producer: Art Ensemble of Chicago

Art Ensemble of Chicago chronology
| Nice Guys (1978) | Live in Berlin (1991) | Full Force (1979) |

Professional ratings
Review scores
| Source | Rating |
|---|---|
| Allmusic | 3/5 stars |

Live in Berlin is a live album by the Art Ensemble of Chicago recorded in March 1979 and first released on the West Wind label in 1991.

== Track listing ==
Disc One

1. "As If It Were The Seasons/A Jackson In Your House/Crushed" (Joseph Jarman/Roscoe Mitchell/Lester Bowie) - 41:10

Disc Two

1. "Dreaming Of The Master/N'Famadou Boudougou/Odwalla" (Joseph Jarman/Don Moye/Roscoe Mitchell) - 39:00

- Recorded March 19, 1979 in Berlin

Note: The Art Ensemble of Chicago discography suggests that the track titles on this release are erroneous and that the correct listing should be:

Disc One

1. "Peter and Judith" (Roscoe Mitchell) - 32.20
2. "Nonaah (Mitchell) - 6:28
3. "Old" (Mitchell) - 2:30

Disc Two

1. "Bass Solo" (Malachi Favors) - 5:27
2. "Tutankhamun" (Favors) - 21:53
3. "Barnyard Scuffel Shuffel" (Lester Bowie) - 2:40
4. "N'Famadou Boudougou" (Don Moye) - 4:40
5. "Odwalla/Theme" (Mitchell) - 4:20

== Personnel ==
- Lester Bowie: trumpet, percussion instruments
- Malachi Favors Maghostut: bass, percussion instruments, vocals
- Joseph Jarman: saxophones, clarinets, percussion instruments
- Roscoe Mitchell: saxophones, clarinets, flute, percussion instruments
- Don Moye: drums, percussion
