= Live at Mandel Hall =

Live album by Art Ensemble of Chicago
- Released: 1972
- Recorded: January 15, 1972
- Venue: Mandel Hall, Chicago, IL
- Genre: Jazz
- Length: 76.25
- Label: Delmark
- Producer: Bob Koester

Art Ensemble of Chicago chronology
Phase One (1972)	Live at Mandel Hall (1972)	Bap-Tizum (1972)

Live at Mandel Hall is a live album by the Art Ensemble of Chicago recorded at the University of Chicago's Mandel Hall on their return to Chicago from Europe in January 1972 and released on the Delmark label. It features performances by Lester Bowie, Joseph Jarman, Roscoe Mitchell, Malachi Favors and Don Moye.

== Reception ==
The Allmusic review by Scott Yanow states "Although there are some meandering moments during their lengthy set, the music almost always holds on to one's interest (a humorous drunken march is a high point) and gives listeners a very good idea of how the Art Ensemble sounded in its early days when it was not at all shy about exploring music's outer limits".

Professional ratings
Review scores
Source	Rating
Allmusic	4.5/5 stars
The Rolling Stone Jazz Record Guide	3/5 stars
The Penguin Guide to Jazz Recordings	3/4 stars

== Track listing ==
1. "Duffvipels/Checkmate/Dautalty/Mata Kimasu" (Art Ensemble of Chicago) - 76:25

== Personnel ==
- Lester Bowie: trumpet, percussion instruments
- Malachi Favors Maghostut: bass, percussion instruments, vocals
- Joseph Jarman: saxophones, clarinets, percussion instruments
- Roscoe Mitchell: saxophones, clarinets, flute, percussion instruments
- Don Moye: drums, percussion
