= Numbers 1 & 2 =

Studio album by Lester Bowie
- Released: 1967
- Recorded: August 11 & 25, 1967
- Genre: Jazz
- Length: 50:16
- Label: Nessa
- Producer: Chuck Nessa

Lester Bowie chronology
Numbers 1 & 2 (1967)	Gittin' to Know Y'All (1970)

Numbers 1 & 2 is a 1967 album by Lester Bowie featuring a line-up that later became the Art Ensemble of Chicago. It was released on the Nessa label and features performances by Bowie, Roscoe Mitchell, Malachi Favors, and Joseph Jarman.

== Reception ==
Professional ratings
Review scores
Source	Rating
AllMusic	3/5 stars
The Rolling Stone Jazz Record Guide	5/5 stars

The AllMusic review by Scott Yanow stated, "The pretty spontaneous music often wanders and rambles a bit, reaching some surprising conclusions and showing expert use of space; very advanced for 1967".

== Track listing ==
Side one

1. "Number 1" (Bowie/Favors/Mitchell) - 21:37

Side two

1. "Number 2" (Mitchell) - 24:27

- "Number 1" recorded August 11, 1967, "Number 2" recorded August 25, 1967, at Sound Studios.

== Personnel ==
- Roscoe Mitchell: alto saxophone, soprano saxophone, flute, recorder, gourd, bells, gong
- Lester Bowie: trumpet, flugelhorn, steer horn, kelp horn
- Malachi Favors: bass, kazoo
- Joseph Jarman: alto saxophone, soprano saxophone, clarinet, bassoon, bells (on "Number 2")
