= Certain Blacks =

Studio album by Art Ensemble of Chicago
- Released: 1970
- Recorded: February 10, 1970
- Genre: Jazz
- Length: 42:25
- Label: America
- Producer: Pierre Berjot

Art Ensemble of Chicago chronology
Comme à la radio (1970)	Certain Blacks (1970)	Go Home (1970)

Reissue Cover

Certain Blacks is an album by the Art Ensemble of Chicago recorded in Paris on February 10, 1970, and released on the America label. It features performances by Lester Bowie, Joseph Jarman, Roscoe Mitchell (credited as Edward Mitchell Jr.), Malachi Favors Maghostut, Chicago Beau, Julio Finn and William A. Howell.

== Reception ==
The Allmusic review by Ron Wynn states: "A classic, with spicy and frenetic solos one moment, comic overtones and clever melodies and rhythms the next. The Art Ensemble at this point were becoming stars overseas, and finding the going increasingly tougher in America. It's outside or avant-garde jazz with soul, heart, and funk".

Professional ratings
Review scores
Source	Rating
Allmusic	3/5 stars
The Rolling Stone Jazz Record Guide	2/5 stars
The Penguin Guide to Jazz Recordings	3/4 stars

== Track listing ==
1. "Certain Blacks 'Do What They Wanna'" (Chicago Beau) - 23:41
2. "One for Jarman" (Chicago Beau) - 7:07
3. "Bye Bye Baby" (Sonny Boy Williamson) - 11:37
- Recorded February 10, 1970, in Paris

== Personnel ==
- Lester Bowie: trumpet
- Chicago Beau: tenor saxophone, piano, harmonica, percussion
- Joseph Jarman: alto saxophone, tenor saxophone, soprano saxophone, vibes, percussion
- Roscoe Mitchell: bass saxophone
- Julio Finn: harmonica
- Malachi Favors Maghostut: bass, percussion
- William A. Howell: drums
