= Ancient to the Future =

Studio album by Art Ensemble of Chicago
- Released: 1987
- Recorded: March 17–19, 1987
- Genre: Jazz
- Length: 47:34
- Label: DIW
- Producer: Art Ensemble of Chicago

Art Ensemble of Chicago chronology
Naked (1986)	Ancient to the Future (1987)	The Alternate Express (1989)

Professional ratings
Review scores
Source	Rating
Allmusic	4/5 stars

Ancient to the Future: Dreaming of the Masters Series Vol. 1 is a 1987 album by the Art Ensemble of Chicago released on the Japanese DIW label. It features performances by Lester Bowie, Joseph Jarman, Roscoe Mitchell, Malachi Favors Maghostut and Don Moye with Bahnamous Lee Bowie guesting.

== Reception ==
The Allmusic review by Brian Olewnick describes the album as "Considered by some to be the Art Ensemble's "pop" record, this album is also one of the very best from the latter portion of their career".

== Track listing ==
1. "Sangaredi/Blues for Zen" (Moye/Jarman) – 9:02
2. "Creole Love Call" (Ellington) – 5:55
3. "These Arms of Mine" (Redding) – 5:12
4. "No Woman, No Cry" (Ford, Marley) – 9:23
5. "Purple Haze" (Hendrix) – 5:36
6. "Zombie" (Kuti) – 5:52
  - Recorded March 17–19, 1987 in Brooklyn

== Personnel ==
- Lester Bowie – trumpet, fluegelhorn
- Malachi Favors Maghostut – bass, percussion instruments
- Joseph Jarman – saxophones, clarinets, percussion instruments
- Roscoe Mitchell – saxophones, clarinets, flute, percussion instruments
- Don Moye – drums, percussion
- Bahnamous Lee Bowie – synthesizer
