= The Alternate Express =

Studio album by Art Ensemble of Chicago
- Released: 1989
- Recorded: January 1989
- Genre: Jazz
- Length: 51:09
- Label: DIW
- Producer: Art Ensemble of Chicago

Art Ensemble of Chicago chronology
Ancient to the Future (1987)	The Alternate Express (1989)	Art Ensemble of Soweto (1990)

Professional ratings
Review scores
Source	Rating
Allmusic	2.5/5 stars

The Alternate Express is a 1989 album by the Art Ensemble of Chicago released on the Japanese DIW label. It features performances by Lester Bowie, Joseph Jarman, Roscoe Mitchell, Malachi Favors Maghostut and Don Moye.

== Reception ==
The Allmusic review by Brian Olewnick describes the album as "only occasionally rising to the level of excitement and inspiration evinced on recordings from the late '60s and early '70s".

== Track listing ==
1. "Whatever Happens" (Bowie) - 9:59
2. "And There Was Peace" (Mitchell) - 5:28
3. "Imaginary Situations" (Art Ensemble of Chicago) - 9:28
4. "Kush" (Favors, Moye) - 21:40
5. "The Alternate Express" (Mitchell) - 4:25

- Recorded January 1989 in Chicago

== Personnel ==
- Lester Bowie: trumpet, fluegelhorn
- Malachi Favors Maghostut: bass, percussion instruments
- Joseph Jarman: saxophones, clarinets, percussion instruments
- Roscoe Mitchell: saxophones, clarinets, flute, percussion instruments
- Don Moye: drums, percussion
