= Art Ensemble of Soweto =

Studio album by Art Ensemble of Chicago with the Amabutho Male Chorus
- Released: 1990
- Recorded: December 1989 & January 1990
- Genre: Jazz
- Length: 48:51
- Label: DIW
- Producer: Art Ensemble of Chicago

Art Ensemble of Chicago chronology
The Alternate Express (1989)	Art Ensemble of Soweto (1990)	America - South Africa (1990)

Professional ratings
Review scores
Source	Rating
AllMusic	2.5/5 stars
DownBeat	4/5 stars

Art Ensemble of Soweto is a 1990 album by the Art Ensemble of Chicago and the Amabutho Male Chorus released on the Japanese DIW label. It features performances by Lester Bowie, Joseph Jarman, Roscoe Mitchell, Malachi Favors Maghostut, and Don Moye with vocals by Elliot Ngubane, Kay Ngwazene, Welcome "Max" Bhe Bhe, Zacheuus Nyoni and Joe Leguabe.

== Reception ==
The AllMusic review by Brian Olewnick describes the album as " very enjoyable recording, possibly the last all-around excellent Art Ensemble release before the group's retrenching after the departure of Joseph Jarman and the untimely death of Lester Bowie".

Bill Shoemaker reviewed the album for DownBeat and assigned it 4 stars. He wrote, "The simultaneous stylistic diversity and programmatic cohesion on Soweto is impressive".

== Track listing ==
1. "Coming Soon" (Bowie) – 1:31
2. "African Woman" (Ngubone) – 13:55
3. "Fundamental Destiny" (Jarman) – 9:14
4. "Fresh Start" (Mitchell) – 6:42
5. "Khauleza" (Amabutho Male Chorus) – 2:44
6. "The Bottom Line" (Art Ensemble of Chicago) – 5:33
7. "Black Man" (Amabutho Male Chorus) – 9:18
  - Recorded December 1989 & January 1990 at Systems Two Studios, Brooklyn, NY

== Personnel ==
- Lester Bowie: trumpet, fluegelhorn, percussion
- Malachi Favors Maghostut: bass, balafon, percussion instruments
- Joseph Jarman: saxophones, clarinets, percussion instruments
- Roscoe Mitchell: saxophones, clarinets, flute, percussion instruments
- Don Moye: drums, percussion
- Elliot Ngubane: lead vocals, percussion, keyboards
- Kay Ngwazene: vocals
- Welcome "Max" Bhe Bhe: vocals
- Zacheuus Nyoni: vocals
- Joe Leguabe: vocals, percussion
