= Chi-Congo =

Studio album by Art Ensemble of Chicago
- Released: 1972
- Recorded: May–June 1970
- Studio: Paris, France
- Genre: Jazz
- Length: 36:49
- Label: Decca Records

Art Ensemble of Chicago chronology
Go Home (1970)	Chi-Congo (1972)	Les Stances a Sophie (1970)

Chi-Congo is an album recorded in Paris in 1970 by the Art Ensemble of Chicago which was first released in 1972 on the French Decca label, later reissued in the US on the Paula label. It features performances by Lester Bowie, Joseph Jarman, Roscoe Mitchell, Malachi Favors Maghostut, and Don Moye.

== Reception ==
The AllMusic review by Rob Ferrier awarded the album 4 stars noting that "these gentlemen are sterling musicians and everything is done for a purpose, exactly when they want it to happen. A wonderful record by a bunch of really great guys".

Professional ratings
Review scores
Source	Rating
AllMusic	4/5 stars
The Rolling Stone Jazz Record Guide	3/5 stars

== Track listing ==
No.	Title	Length
1.	"Chi-Congo" (Favors)	11:40
2.	"Enlorfe" (Mitchell)	14:39
3.	"Hippparippp" (Mitchell)	10:30

== Personnel ==
- Lester Bowie – trumpet, percussion instruments
- Malachi Favors Maghostut – bass, percussion instruments, vocals
- Joseph Jarman – saxophones, clarinets, percussion instruments
- Roscoe Mitchell – saxophones, clarinets, flute, percussion instruments
- Don Moye – drums, percussion
