= The Complete Live in Japan =

Live album by Art Ensemble of Chicago
- Released: 1988
- Recorded: April 22, 1984
- Venues: Kan-i Hoken Hall, Gotanda, Tokyo, Japan
- Genre: Jazz
- Length: 96:52
- Labels: DIW; DIW-8021/8022
- Producer: Art Ensemble of Chicago

Art Ensemble of Chicago chronology
Among the People (1980)	The Complete Live in Japan (1988)	The Third Decade (1984)

Live in Japan Cover

The Complete Live in Japan is a live album by the Art Ensemble of Chicago recorded in Tokyo, Japan in 1984 and released in 1988 on the Japanese DIW label. The original (much shorter) single LP titled Live in Japan was originally issued in 1985.

Professional ratings
Review scores
Source	Rating
Allmusic	3/5 stars

== Track listing ==
1. "Spanish Song" (Roscoe Mitchell) - 25:05
2. "Ancestral Voices/Old" (Joseph Jarman/Mitchell) - 11:14
3. "Ornedaruth" (Jarman) - 22:43
4. "The Beginning" (Lester Bowie) - 3:27
5. "Waltz" (Mitchell) - 2:39
6. "Building the Mid" (Don Moye) - 6:09
7. "Old Time Southside Street Dance" (Jarman) - 10:02
8. "Zero" (Bowie) - 6:45
9. "Funky Aeco" (Art Ensemble of Chicago) - 5:18
10. "Odwalla/Theme" (Mitchell) - 3:29

== Personnel ==
- Lester Bowie: trumpet, bass drum
- Malachi Favors Maghostut: bass, percussion instruments
- Joseph Jarman: saxophones, clarinets, percussion instruments
- Roscoe Mitchell: saxophones, clarinets, flute, percussion instruments
- Don Moye: drums, percussion
