= America – South Africa =

America - South Africa

Studio album by Art Ensemble of Chicago with the Amabutho Male Chorus
- Released: 1990
- Recorded: December, 1989 & January, 1990
- Genre: Jazz
- Length: 48:15
- Label: DIW/Columbia
- Producer: Art Ensemble of Chicago

Art Ensemble of Chicago chronology
Art Ensemble of Soweto (1990)	America - South Africa (1990)	Thelonious Sphere Monk (1991)

Professional ratings
Review scores
Source	Rating
Allmusic	2.5/5 stars

America – South Africa is a 1991 album by the Art Ensemble of Chicago and the Amabutho Male Chorus released on the Japanese DIW label in association with Columbia Records. It features performances by Lester Bowie, Joseph Jarman, Roscoe Mitchell, Malachi Favors Maghostut and Don Moye with vocals by Elliot Ngubane, Kay Ngwazene, Welcome "Max" Bhe Bhe, Zacheuus Nyoni and Joe Leguabe.

== Reception ==
The Allmusic review by Ron Wynn describes the album as a mix of "African rhythms, township melodies, and the Ensemble's usual array of blistering solos, vocal effects, percussive colors, and furious collective improvisations".

== Track listing ==
1. "U.S. Of A. - U. Of S.A." (Art Ensemble of Chicago, Leguwabe) - 17:56
2. "Colors One" (Art Ensemble of Chicago) - 3:52
3. "Eric T" (Jarman) - 3:11
4. "You Got It" (Art Ensemble of Chicago) - 14:12
5. "America" (Amabutho Male Chorus) - 5:12
6. "Zola's Smile" (Art Ensemble of Chicago) - 3:52
  - Recorded December 1989 & January 1990 at Systems Two Studios, Brooklyn, NY

== Personnel ==
- Lester Bowie: trumpet, fluegelhorn, percussion
- Malachi Favors Maghostut: bass, balafon, percussion instruments
- Joseph Jarman: saxophones, clarinets, percussion instruments
- Roscoe Mitchell: saxophones, clarinets, flute, percussion instruments
- Don Moye: drums, percussion
- Elliot Ngubane: lead vocals, percussion, keyboards
- Kay Ngwazene: vocals
- Welcome "Max" Bhe Bhe: vocals
- Zacheuus Nyoni: vocals
- Joe Leguabe: vocals, percussion
