= Full Force (Art Ensemble of Chicago album) =

Studio album by Art Ensemble of Chicago
- Released: April 1, 1980
- Recorded: January 1980
- Studio: Columbia Recording Studios, New York
- Genre: Jazz
- Length: 42:34
- Label: ECM
- Producer: Manfred Eicher

Art Ensemble of Chicago chronology
Live in Berlin (1978)	Full Force (1980)	Urban Bushmen (1981)

Full Force is a 1980 album by the Art Ensemble of Chicago, their second to appear on the ECM label.

== Reception ==
The album was identified by Chris Kelsey in his AllMusic essay "Free Jazz: A Subjective History" as one of the 20 Essential Free Jazz Albums.

The AllMusic review by Michael G. Nastos states: "Their music in this era continued in a developmental phase, stripping away nuance and shadings in lieu of pure expressionism, even more experimental while utilizing thematic ideas that alternately suggest world music fusions and tune structures. This may be the most accessible Art Ensemble of Chicago album, perhaps disappointing for some hardcore fans, but certainly illuminating to many others unexposed to their unmitigated brilliance".

Professional ratings
Review scores
Source	Rating
AllMusic	2/5 stars
The Penguin Guide to Jazz Recordings	3/4 stars
The Rolling Stone Jazz Record Guide	5/5 stars

== Track listing ==
1. "Magg Zelma" (Malachi Favors) - 19:50
2. "Care Free" (Roscoe Mitchell) 0:50
3. "Charlie M" (Lester Bowie) - 9:18
4. "Old Time Southside Street Dance" (Joseph Jarman) - 5:12
5. "Full Force" (Art Ensemble of Chicago) - 7:24

== Personnel ==
- Lester Bowie – trumpet, celeste, bass drum
- Malachi Favors – double bass, percussion, melodica
- Joseph Jarman – saxophone, clarinet, percussion, vocal
- Roscoe Mitchell – saxophone, clarinet, flute, percussion
- Don Moye – drums, percussion, vocal
