= People in Sorrow =

Studio album by Art Ensemble of Chicago
- Released: 1969
- Recorded: July 7, 1969
- Genre: Jazz
- Length: 40:10
- Label: Pathé-Marconi

Art Ensemble of Chicago chronology
The Spiritual (1969)	People in Sorrow (1969)	Message to Our Folks (1969)

People in Sorrow is a 1969 album by the Art Ensemble of Chicago recorded in Boulogne for the French Pathé-Marconi label, later reissued in the US on Nessa Records. It features an extended improvised performance by Lester Bowie, Joseph Jarman, Roscoe Mitchell and Malachi Favors Maghostut. The album was also reissued in May 2026 by the Berlin-based label play loud! productions on vinyl and CD, accompanied by extended liner notes by music journalist Chris Morris, bringing renewed attention to this landmark recording.

== Reception ==
The Allmusic review by Scott Yanow states "The still-startling music, which uses space, dynamics, and a wide range of emotions expertly, is not for everyone's taste (the high-energy tenors of the mid-1960s are actually easier to get into), but worth the struggle". The Rolling Stone Jazz Record Guide said "their masterpiece, People in Sorrow, a forty-minute example of how the group's menagerie of instruments and spontaneous approach to structure can create clearly delineated precisely shaded and starkly emotional music".

Professional ratings
Review scores
Source	Rating
Allmusic	4/5 stars
The Rolling Stone Jazz Record Guide	5/5 stars

== Track listing ==
1. "People In Sorrow Part 1" - 17:05
2. "People In Sorrow Part 2" - 23:05

All compositions by the Art Ensemble of Chicago
- Recorded July 7, 1969 in Boulogne, Paris

== Personnel ==
- Lester Bowie: trumpet, percussion instruments
- Malachi Favors Maghostut: bass, percussion instruments, vocals
- Joseph Jarman: saxophones, clarinets, percussion instruments, oboe
- Roscoe Mitchell: saxophones, clarinets, flute, percussion instruments
