= The Third Decade =

Studio album by Art Ensemble of Chicago
- Released: 1985
- Recorded: June 1984
- Studio: Tonstudio Bauer; Ludwigsburg, West Germany
- Genre: Jazz
- Length: 41:45
- Label: ECM 1273
- Producer: Manfred Eicher

Art Ensemble of Chicago chronology
The Complete Live in Japan (1984)	The Third Decade (1985)	Naked (1984)

The Third Decade is an album by the Art Ensemble of Chicago recorded in June 1984 and released on ECM the following year.

== Reception ==
Professional ratings
Review scores
Source	Rating
AllMusic	4.5/5 stars
The Penguin Guide to Jazz Recordings	2.5/4 stars

In his review for AllMusic, Stephen Cook stated "For the Art Ensemble of Chicago, Third Decade marked both the end of their relationship with the ECM label and the beginning of a more streamlined stretch of music making. The band would cut back on their once predominant, free-form explorations to make room for more bebop and crossover material". The Penguin Guide to Jazz on CD reviewed the album negatively, calling it "nothing so much as the atrophy of a once-radical band."

Spin wrote, "While not a spectacular LP it is an important exhibit of the kinds of musical moods the group has created over the years. A brief collective history of five men who, for more than 20 years, have shared experiences of great power and poignancy."

== Track listing ==
1. "Prayer for Jimbo Kwesi" (Joseph Jarman) - 9:52
2. "Funky Aeco" (Art Ensemble of Chicago) - 7:43
3. "Walking in the Moonlight" (Roscoe Mitchell) - 4:11
4. "The Bell Piece" (Mitchell) - 6:07
5. "Zero" (Lester Bowie) - 6:00
6. "Third Decade" (Art Ensemble of Chicago) - 8:19

== Personnel ==
=== Art Ensemble of Chicago ===
- Lester Bowie – trumpet, fluegelhorn
- Malachi Favors Maghostut – bass, percussion instruments
- Joseph Jarman – saxophones, clarinets, percussion instruments, synthesizer
- Roscoe Mitchell – saxophones, clarinets, flute, percussion instruments
- Don Moye – drums, percussion
