= AECO Records =

AECO Records is a record label started by the Art Ensemble Of Chicago.

== Discography ==
- AECO 001: Don Moye – Sun Percussion Volume One
- AECO 002: Joseph Jarman – Sunbound Volume One
- AECO 003: Brother Malachi Favors Magoustous – Natural and the Spiritual
- AECO 004: Art Ensemble of Chicago – Kabalaba
- AECO 007: Don Moye – Jam for Your Life!
- AECO 008: Art Ensemble of Chicago and Don Pullen – Fundamental Destiny
- AECO 012: Art Ensemble of Chicago – Salutes the Chicago Blues Tradition
- AECO 3009: Don Moye & Enoch Williamson – Afrikan Song
