= Live at Last (Maghostut Trio album) =

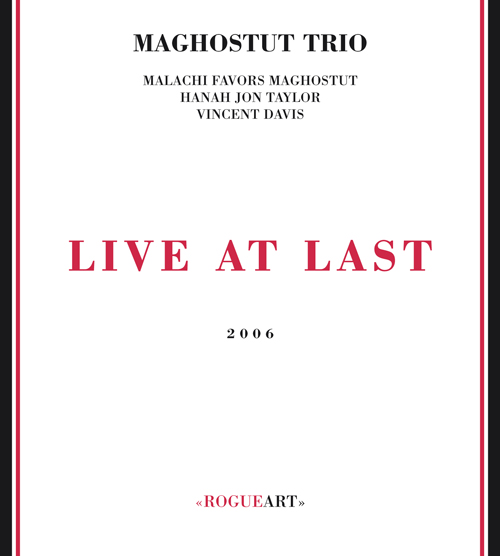

Live album by Maghostut Trio
- Released: 2006
- Recorded: October 10, 2003; October 16, 2003
- Venues: University of Wisconsin, Madison, Wisconsin; Velvet Lounge, Chicago, Illinois
- Genre: Free jazz
- Length: 56:36
- Labels: RogueArt; ROG-0005
- Producer: Michel Dorbon

Live at Last is a live album by the Maghostut Trio: double bassist and leader Malachi Favors Maghostut, multi-instrumentalist Hanah Jon Taylor, and percussionist Vincent Davis. Five of the album's tracks were recorded on October 10, 2003, several months before Favors' death, at the University of Wisconsin in Madison, Wisconsin, while the remaining track was recorded six days later at the Velvet Lounge in Chicago, Illinois. The album was released on CD in 2006 by RogueArt.

== Reception ==
Professional ratings
Review scores
Source	Rating
AllMusic	3/5 stars

In a review for AllMusic, Alain Drouot wrote: "Fans of the bassist will enjoy his rich sound and intricate rhythms... the set hints at what the trio could have achieved should it have had the chance to grow and remains a valuable document for anyone with an interest in jazz made in Chicago."

Clifford Allen of All About Jazz stated: "As far as it may seem from the Art Ensemble tradition, where this group excels is in wide-open blowing and funky free-bop... But looking at Maghostut's pedigree, such a form is validly 'Ancient to the Future,' as the AEC definition has it."

Writing for Point of Departure, Bill Shoemaker commented: "Few recordings give such a detailing of how Favors melded the cohering rumble of Chicago bassists like Wilbur Ware and the buoyancy of traditional African string instrumentalists. This is a fitting tribute to Favors, who, by now, has moseyed a good ways back to Sirius, where he came into being some 43,070-odd years ago."

In an article for Isthmus, Tom Laskin wrote: "Malachi Favors Maghostut is no longer with us, but his powerful, extraordinarily deft bass playing is well represented on this snapshot of the trio that took his name... Folks who view jazz not as a museum piece but rather as a living, growing thing already miss Maghostut terribly. When they hear this performance, they will miss him even more. Kudos is due to both Taylor and Davis for tapping into his spirit while he was alive and drawing inspiration from him now that he's gone. They'll assure a place for more maverick music in this world just by keeping his memory close at hand."

== Track listing ==
1. "Talkin' To You" (Favors/Taylor/Davis) – 7:07
2. "Au Privave" (Charlie Parker) – 7:27
3. "Maghostut" (Favors/Taylor/Davis) – 12:38
4. "Electric Elephant Dance" (Taylor) – 6:55
5. "Beware of the Wolf" (Favors) – 10:38
6. "My Babe" (Traditional) – 11:48

== Personnel ==
- Malachi Favors Maghostut – double bass
- Hanah Jon Taylor – soprano saxophone, tenor saxophone, flute, keyboards
- Vincent Davis – percussion
