= Malachi Favors =

American jazz bassist

Background information
- Born: August 22, 1927; Lexington, Mississippi, U.S.
- Died: January 30, 2004 (aged 76) Chicago, Illinois, U.S.
- Genres: Jazz
- Occupation: Musician
- Instrument: Double bass
- Years active: 1950–2000

Malachi Favors (August 22, 1927 – January 30, 2004) was an American jazz bassist who played with the Art Ensemble of Chicago.

== Biography ==
"Favors's tendency to dissemble about his age was a well-known source of mirth to fellow musicians of his generation". Most reference works give his year of birth of 1937, but, following his death, his daughter stated that it was 1927.

Favors primarily played the double bass, but also played the electric bass guitar, banjo, zither, gong, and other instruments. He began playing double bass at the age of 15 and began performing professionally upon graduating from high school. Early performances included work with Dizzy Gillespie and Freddie Hubbard. By 1965, he was a founder of the Association for the Advancement of Creative Musicians and a member of Muhal Richard Abrams' Experimental Band.

At some point he added the word "Maghostut" to his name and because of this he is commonly listed as "Malachi Favors Maghostut". Musically he is most associated with bebop, hard bop, and particularly free jazz.

Favors was a protégé of Chicago bassist Wilbur Ware. His first known recording was a 1953 session with tenor saxophonist Paul Bascomb. He made an LP with Chicago pianist Andrew Hill (1959). Favors began working with Roscoe Mitchell in 1966; this group eventually became the Art Ensemble of Chicago. Favors also worked outside the group, with artists including Sunny Murray, Archie Shepp, and Dewey Redman.

Prominent records include Natural & Spiritual (solo bass and percussion, 1978) and Sightsong (duets with Muhal Richard Abrams, 1975). In 1994 he played with Roman Bunka (Oud) at Berlin Jazz Fest and recorded the 'German Critics Poll Winner' album, Color Me Cairo.

Favors died from pancreatic cancer in January 2004, at the age of 76.

== Discography ==
=== As leader or co-leader ===
- Natural & Spiritual (AECO, 1978)
- 2 x 4 (Southport, 1999) with Tatsu Aoki
- Live at Last (Rogueart, 2006)

=== With Art Ensemble of Chicago ===
Title	Year	Label
Sound – Roscoe Mitchell Sextet	1966	Delmark
Old/Quartet – Roscoe Mitchell	1967	Nessa
Numbers 1 & 2 – Lester Bowie	1967	Nessa
Early Combinations – Art Ensemble	1967	Nessa
Congliptious – Roscoe Mitchell Art Ensemble	1968	Nessa
A Jackson in Your House	1969	Actuel
Tutankhamun	1969	Freedom
The Spiritual	1969	Freedom
People in Sorrow	1969	Pathé-Marconi
Message to Our Folks	1969	Actuel
Reese and the Smooth Ones	1969	Actuel
Eda Wobu	1969	JMY
Certain Blacks	1970	America
Go Home	1970	Galloway
Chi-Congo	1970	Paula
Les Stances a Sophie	1970	Pathé-Marconi
Live in Paris	1970	Freedom
Art Ensemble of Chicago with Fontella Bass	1970	America
Phase One	1971	America
Live at Mandell Hall	1972	Delmark
Bap-Tizum	1972	Atlantic
Fanfare for the Warriors	1973	Atlantic
Kabalaba	1974	AECO
Nice Guys	1978	ECM
Live in Berlin	1979	West Wind
Full Force	1980	ECM
Urban Bushmen	1980	ECM
Among the People	1980	Praxis
The Complete Live in Japan	1984	DIW
The Third Decade	1984	ECM
Naked	1986	DIW
Ancient to the Future	1987	DIW
The Alternate Express	1989	DIW
Art Ensemble of Soweto	1990	DIW
America – South Africa	1990	DIW
Thelonious Sphere Monk with Cecil Taylor	1990	DIW
Dreaming of the Masters Suite	1990	DIW
Live at the 6th Tokyo Music Joy with Lester Bowie's Brass Fantasy	1991	DIW
Fundamental Destiny with Don Pullen	1991	AECO
Salutes the Chicago Blues Tradition	1993	AECO
Coming Home Jamaica	1996	Atlantic
Urban Magic	1997	AECO
Tribute to Lester	2001	ECM
Reunion	2003	Around Jazz
The Meeting	2003	Pi
Sirius Calling	2004	Pi

=== As sideman ===
With Ahmed Abdullah

- Liquid Magic (Silkheart, 1987)

With Fred Anderson

- Black Horn Long Gone (Southport, 1993)

With Charles Brackeen

- Bannar (Silkheart, 1987)

With Bright Moments: Joseph Jarman, Kalaparusha Maurice McIntyre, Kahil El'Zabar and Adegoke Steve Colson

- Return of the Lost Tribe (Delmark, 1998)

With Roman Bunka

- Color Me Cairo (Enja, 1995)

With Kahil El'Zabar

- Sacred Love (Sound Aspects, 1985)
- Another Kind of Groove (Sound Aspects, 1986)
- The Ancestors Are Amongst Us (Katalyst Entertainment, 1987)
- Alika Rising at Leverkusener Jazztage (Sound Aspects, 1989)
- Renaissance of the Resistance (Delmark, 1993)
- Big Cliff (Delmark, 1994)
- Jitterbug Junction (CIMP, 1997)
- Conversations (Delmark, 1999) with Archie Shepp
- Africa N'Da Blues (Delmark, 1999) featuring Pharoah Sanders

With Dennis González

- Stefan (Silkheart, 1987)
- Namesake (Silkheart, 1987)

With Andrew Hill

- So in Love (Warwick, 1960)

With Maurice McIntyre

- Humility in the Light of the Creator (Delmark, 1969)

With Roscoe Mitchell

- Before There Was Sound (Nessa, 1965; issued 2011)
- Nonaah (Nessa, 1977)
- The Flow of Things (Black Saint, 1986)
- Hey Donald (Delmark, 1995)
- The Day and the Night (Dizim, 1997)

With Sunny Murray

- Sunshine (BYG, 1969)
- Homage to Africa (BYG, 1969)
- An Even Break (Never Give a Sucker) (BYG, 1970)
- Live at Moers Festival (Moers Music, 1979)

With Dewey Redman

- Tarik (BYG, 1969)

With Archie Shepp

- Blasé (BYG, 1969)

With Alan Silva

- Luna Surface (BYG, 1969)
- Seasons (BYG, 1971)

With Wadada Leo Smith

- Reflectativity (Tzadik, 2000)
- Golden Quartet (Tzadik, 2000)
- The Year of the Elephant (Pi, 2002)
