= Congliptious =

Studio album by Roscoe Mitchell
- Released: 1968
- Recorded: February 4 & March 11, 1968
- Genre: Jazz
- Length: 50:16
- Label: Nessa
- Producer: Chuck Nessa

Roscoe Mitchell chronology
Early Combinations (1967)	Congliptious (1968)	Solo Saxophone Concerts (1974)

Professional ratings
Review scores
Source	Rating
Allmusic	4.5/5 stars
The Rolling Stone Jazz Record Guide	5/5 stars

Congliptious is a 1968 album by Roscoe Mitchell's Art Ensemble which later became the Art Ensemble of Chicago. It was released on the Nessa label and features performances by Mitchell, Lester Bowie, Malachi Favors, and Robert Crowder. "Tutankhamen" is a bass solo by Malahi Favors, "Tkhke" is an alto saxophone solo by Roscoe Mitchell and "Jazz Death?" is a trumpet solo by Lester Bowie with the full ensemble performing "Congliptious/Old".

== Track listing ==
Side one

1. "Tutankhamen" (Favors) – 6:38
2. "Tkhke" - 6:58
3. "Jazz Death?" (Bowie) - 7:19

Side two

1. "Congliptious/Old" - 19:28

All compositions by Roscoe Mitchell except as indicated

- Side One recorded 4 March 1968, Side Two recorded 11 March 1968.

== Personnel ==
- Roscoe Mitchell – alto saxophone, soprano saxophone, bass saxophone, flute, recorder, percussion (on "Tkhke" & "Congliptious/Old")
- Lester Bowie – trumpet, flugelhorn, steer horn, bass drum, percussion (on "Jazz Death?" & "Congliptious/Old")
- Malachi Favors – bass, electric bass, percussion (on "Tutankhamen" & "Congliptious/Old")
- Robert Crowder – drums (on "Congliptious/Old")
