= Art Ensemble of Chicago =

American avant-garde jazz group

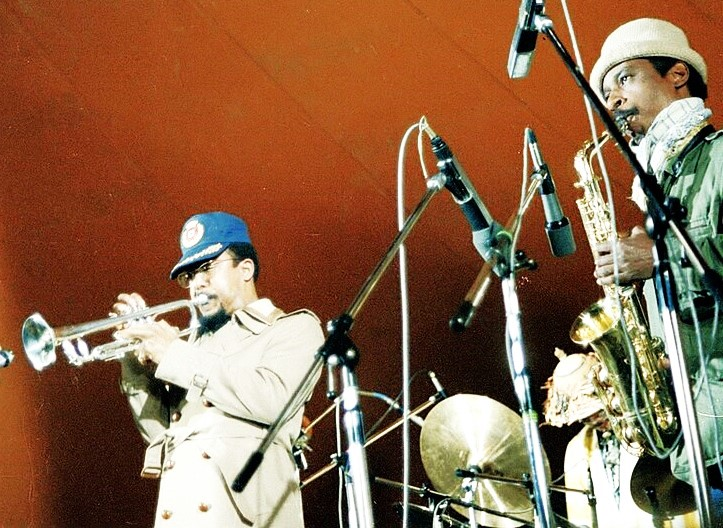
- Art Ensemble of Chicago, New Jazz Festival Moers (Moers Festival), 1978

Background information
- Origin: Chicago, Illinois, U.S.
- Genres: Avant-garde jazz, free jazz
- Years active: 1969–present
- Labels: BYG, Nessa, Delmark, Atlantic Records, ECM, AECO, Pi
- Members: Roscoe Mitchell; Famadou Don Moye; and "guests"
- Past members: Lester Bowie; Malachi Favors; Joseph Jarman; Phillip Wilson; Corey Wilkes; Baba Sissoko; Ari Brown; Elliot Ngubone
- Website: www.artensembleofchicago.com

The Art Ensemble of Chicago is an avant-garde jazz group that grew out of the Association for the Advancement of Creative Musicians (AACM) in the late 1960s. The ensemble integrates many jazz styles and plays many instruments, including "little instruments": bells, bicycle horns, birthday party noisemakers, wind chimes, and various forms of percussion. The musicians would wear costumes and face paint while performing. These characteristics combined to make the ensemble's performances both aural and visual. While playing in Europe in 1969, five hundred instruments were used.

== History ==
Members of what was to become the Art Ensemble performed together under various band names in the mid-sixties, as members of the Association for the Advancement of Creative Musicians (AACM). They performed on the 1966 album Sound, as the Roscoe Mitchell Sextet. The Sextet included saxophonist Roscoe Mitchell, trumpeter Lester Bowie, and bassist Malachi Favors. For the next year, they played as the Roscoe Mitchell Art Ensemble. In 1967, they were joined by fellow AACM members Joseph Jarman (saxophone) and Phillip Wilson (drums) and recorded for Nessa Records.

All of the musicians were multi-instrumentalists. Jarman and Mitchell's primary instruments were alto and tenor saxophone, respectively. Additionally, they both played other saxophones ranging from the small sopranino to the large bass saxophone, as well as the flute and clarinet. In addition to trumpet, Bowie played flugelhorn, cornet, shofar, and conch shells. Favors added touches of banjo and bass guitar. Most of them dabbled in piano, synthesizer, and other keyboards, and they all played percussion instruments.

They were known for wearing costumes and makeup on stage. Member Joseph Jarman described part of their style:

So what we were doing with that face painting was representing everyone throughout the universe, and that was expressed in the music as well. That's why the music was so interesting. It wasn't limited to Western instruments, African instruments, or Asian instruments, or South American instruments, or anybody's instruments.

In 1967, Wilson left the group to join Paul Butterfield's band, and for a period the group was a quartet without a full-time drummer. Jarman and Mitchell served as artistic directors at the cooperative summer camp Circle Pines Center in Delton, Michigan, in August 1968, during the same week that the Democratic Convention was in Chicago. After a farewell concert at the Unitarian Church in Evanston, Illinois, in fall, 1968, the remaining group traveled to Paris. In Paris, the ensemble was based at the Théâtre du Vieux Colombier. In France, they became known as the Art Ensemble of Chicago. The impetus for the name change came from a French promoter who added "of Chicago" to their name for descriptive purposes. The new name stuck because band members felt that it better reflected the cooperative nature of the group. In Paris, the ensemble was based at the Théâtre du Vieux Colombier and they recorded for the Freedom and BYG labels. They also recorded Comme à la radio with Brigitte Fontaine and Areski Belkacem but without a drummer until percussionist Don Moye became a member of the group in 1970. During that year, they recorded the albums Art Ensemble of Chicago with Fontella Bass and Les Stances a Sophie with singer Fontella Bass, who was Lester Bowie's wife. The latter was the soundtrack to the French movie of the same title.

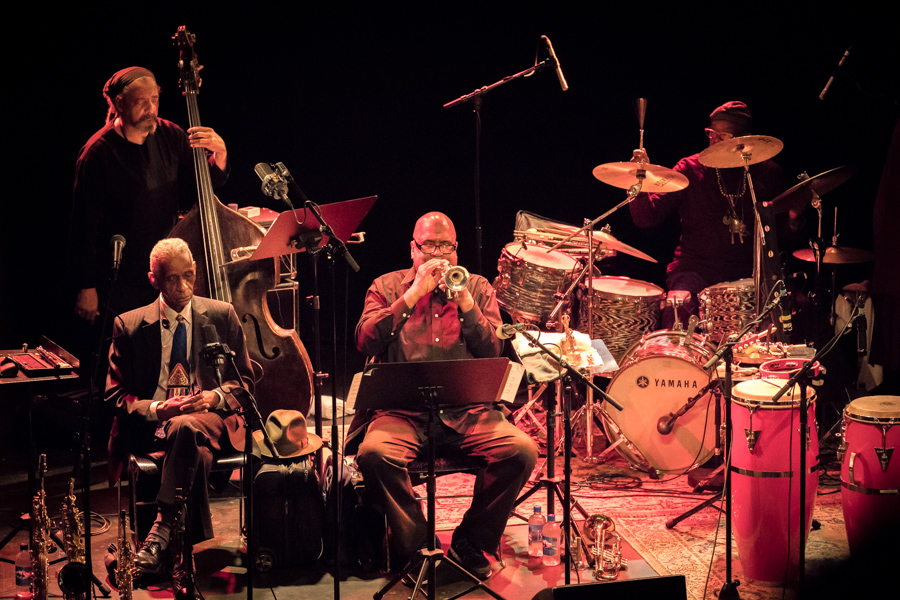
At the 2017 Kongsberg Jazzfestival

=== Fifty years on ===
Lester Bowie died of liver cancer in 1999. Malachi Favors died in 2004 of pancreatic cancer. Joseph Jarman died on January 9, 2019, of respiratory failure.

As of 2017-2019 Mitchell and Moye remained active, with new and previous collaborators as guest under the name Art Ensemble of Chicago - 50th Anniversary Large Ensemble. They released an album in 2019:

- Roscoe Mitchell – saxophones;
- Famoudou Don Moye – drums, congas and percussion.

Guests:

- Babu Atiba – african drums and djembe
- Fred Berry – trumpet, flugelhorn
- Silvia Bolognesi– double bass
- Brett Carson – piano
- Jean Cook – violin
- Steed Cowart – conductor
- Rodolfo Cordova-Lebron – voice
- Dudu Kouaté – African percussion
- yuniya edi kwon – viola/violin
- William Lang - trombone
- Nicole Mitchell – flutes
- Moor Mother – spoken word
- Erina Newkirk – soprano vocals
- Junius Paul – double bass and objects
- Hugh Ragin – trumpet, flugelhorn and piccolo trumpet
- Tomeka Reid – cello
- Stephen Rush - conductor
- Jaribu Shahid – double bass
- Abel Selaocoe – cello
- Simon Sieger – trombone
- Baba Sissoko – African percussion
- Titos Sompa – vocals, congas, mbira, bells
- Christina Wheeler – voice, array mbira, autoharp, q-chord, theremin, sampler, electronics
- Enoch Williamson – congas, djembe and percussion

and another in 2023 with a smaller ensemble of 20 musicians – The Sixth Decade: From Paris to Paris.

== Discography ==
Title	Year	Label
Sound - Roscoe Mitchell Sextet	1966	Delmark
Old/Quartet - Roscoe Mitchell	1967	Nessa
Numbers 1 & 2 - Lester Bowie	1967	Nessa
Early Combinations - Art Ensemble	1967	Nessa
Congliptious - Roscoe Mitchell Art Ensemble	1968	Nessa
A Jackson in Your House	1969	BYG Actuel
Tutankhamun	1969	Freedom
The Spiritual	1969	Freedom
People in Sorrow	1969	Nessa
Message to Our Folks	1969	BYG-Actuel
Reese and the Smooth Ones	1969	BYG-Actuel
Eda Wobu	1969	JMY
Comme à la radio	1970	Saravah
Certain Blacks	1970	America
Go Home	1970	Galloway
Chi-Congo	1970	Paula
Les Stances a Sophie	1970	Nessa
Live in Paris	1970	Freedom
Art Ensemble of Chicago with Fontella Bass	1970	America
Phase One	1971	America
Live at Mandel Hall	1972	Delmark
Bap-Tizum	1972	Atlantic
Fanfare for the Warriors	1973	Atlantic
Kabalaba	1974	AECO
Nice Guys	1978	ECM
Live in Berlin	1979	West Wind
Full Force	1980	ECM
Urban Bushmen	1980	ECM
Among the People	1980	Praxis
The Third Decade	1984	ECM
The Complete Live in Japan recorded 1984	1985, expanded 1988	DIW
Naked	1986	DIW
Ancient to the Future: Dreaming of the Masters Series Vol. 1	1987	DIW
The Alternate Express	1989	DIW
Art Ensemble of Soweto	1990	DIW
America - South Africa	1990	DIW
Dreaming of the Masters Suite	1990	DIW
Thelonious Sphere Monk: Dreaming of the Masters Series Vol. 2 with Cecil Taylor	1990	DIW
Live at the 6th Tokyo Music Joy	1990	DIW
Salutes the Chicago Blues Tradition	1993	AECO
Coming Home Jamaica	1996	Atlantic
Zero Sun No Point with Hartmut Geerken	1996	Leo
Urban Magic	1997	Musica
Tribute to Lester	2001	ECM
Reunion	2003	Around jazz / Il Manifesto
The Meeting	2003	Pi
Sirius Calling	2004	Pi
Non-Cognitive Aspects of the City recorded 2004	2006	Pi
Fundamental Destiny, recorded 1991 with Don Pullen	2007	AECO
Live at Earshot Jazz Festival, 2002 with Fred Anderson	2007	Milo
Peace Be Unto You with Fred Anderson	2008	AECO
We Are on the Edge (A 50th Anniversary Celebration)	2019	Pi
The Sixth Decade: From Paris to Paris	2023	RogueArt

== Films ==
- 1982 - Great Black Music - The Art Ensemble of Chicago Television documentary broadcast by Channel 4 in November 1982.
- 1982 - Live From the Jazz Showcase: The Art Ensemble of Chicago (directed by William J Mahin, the University of Illinois at Chicago). Filmed at Joe Segal's Jazz Showcase in Chicago, November 1, 1981.
