= JMY Records =

JMY Records (Jazz Music Yesterday) was an Italian record label that produced a number of albums of major jazz players in the 1990s, based on mainly live recordings from the 1960s and 1970s.

== Artists ==
- Dave Brubeck
- Sarah Vaughan
- Miles Davis
- Quincy Jones
- Bobby Hutcherson and Harold Land
- Dollar Brand
- Archie Shepp
- Art Ensemble of Chicago
- Ray Charles
- Duke Ellington
- Phil Woods
