= George E. Lewis =

American composer, performer, and music scholar

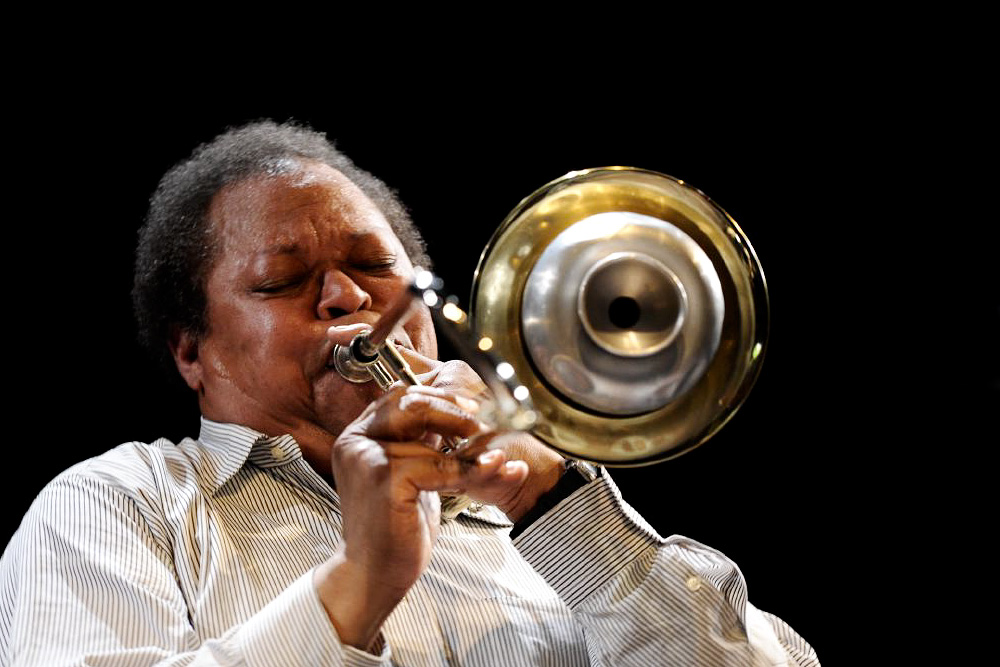
- Lewis playing at the Moers Festival in 2009

Background information
- Born: George Emanuel Lewis; July 14, 1952 (age 74); Chicago, Illinois, U.S.
- Genres: Experimental, contemporary classical, avant-garde jazz, computer music
- Occupations: Musician, composer, professor
- Labels: Sackville, Charly, Black Saint, Soul Note, Avant, Music & Arts, Pi, Incus, Tzadik
- Website: music.columbia.edu/bios/george-e-lewis

George Emanuel Lewis (born July 14, 1952) is an American composer, trombonist, and musicologist. Lewis is the Edwin H. Case Professor of American Music, Composition & Historical Musicology at Columbia University. His music spans genres including avant-garde jazz, contemporary classical and experimental music.

He is renowned for his work as an improvising trombonist and considered a pioneer of computer music, which he began pursuing in the late 1970s; in the 1980s he created Voyager, an improvising software that he has used in interactive performances. Lewis's honors include a MacArthur Fellowship, a Guggenheim Fellowship, and the American Book Award received for his book A Power Stronger Than Itself: The AACM and American Experimental Music. He has been a member of the Association for the Advancement of Creative Musicians (AACM) since 1971, when he joined the organization at the age of 19.

== Early life ==
George E. Lewis was born on July 14, 1952, in Chicago, Illinois. His father, George Thomas Lewis, was a postal worker who studied electronics under the GI Bill and had a deep love of jazz music; his mother, Cornelia Griffith Lewis, liked blues, soul, and R&B singers.

Lewis began his education at a public elementary school, but he was one of many Black students who could only attend half-days, allegedly to relieve "overcrowding"; this was widely understood to be an excuse to enforce de facto segregation under superintendent Benjamin Willis, whose policies led to the 1963 Chicago Public Schools boycott. An African-American teacher convinced Lewis's parents to enroll him at the University of Chicago Laboratory School, where he started classes at the age of nine. Lewis attended the Lab School from 1961 until his graduation in 1969.

His parents wanted him to learn an instrument as a way to make friends, and Lewis chose the trombone, which was paid for in monthly installments. He played in the school orchestra and concert band, took private lessons from University of Chicago graduate students, and as a teenager joined the school's new jazz band, run by jazz historian Frank Tirro (then working on his PhD) and Dean Hey. In the late 1960s, classmate Ray Anderson took Lewis to hear Fred Anderson at an AACM concert, and Lewis first heard the Art Ensemble of Chicago at another concert on his high-school campus.

== Education and joining the AACM ==
Lewis was accepted to Yale University in 1969, and at the age of 17 began his studies in prelaw. He also took music theory classes and met a number of artists in the community, but began to lose interest in school after his sophomore year and decided to take a break.

In 1971, during his time off in Chicago, Lewis heard some musicians practicing together near his parents' house; he introduced himself, and met Muhal Richard Abrams, John Shenoy Jackson, Steve Galloway, and Pete Cosey. Lewis was invited to check out a show at the Pumpkin Room, but misunderstood the invitation and brought his trombone; they let him play anyway, as part of a group that also included Joseph Jarman, Kalaparusha, and Steve McCall. Lewis worried about his performance, but McCall invited him to play another concert; at rehearsal, he was introduced to Roscoe Mitchell, Malachi Favors, Sabu Toyozumi, Aaron Dodd, and Douglas Ewart. Lewis became more involved with the AACM, and Jackson encouraged him to apply to join the group. After being accepted, Lewis was voted reading secretary and began taking minutes at weekly meetings. He regularly played late gigs with the Muhal Richard Abrams Big Band during his year off, and in the daytime held a United Steelworkers union job at Illinois Slag and Ballast Company.

Lewis returned to Yale in 1972, just as the university began its Duke Ellington Fellowship Program; artists brought to campus during Lewis's remaining years included Duke Ellington, Charles Mingus, Max Roach, Dizzy Gillespie, William Warfield, Papa Jo Jones, Willie "The Lion" Smith, Marion Williams, Tony Williams, and Slam Stewart. Lewis met many more musicians among Yale's students, faculty, and others living near New Haven such as Wadada Leo Smith, who began visiting Lewis early in the morning before his classes. As a member of the secretive Skull and Bones society, put in charge of music, he also came into close social contact with members of the power elite, including William F. Buckley and future President George W. Bush.

Lewis graduated from Yale in 1974 with a degree in philosophy.

== Career ==
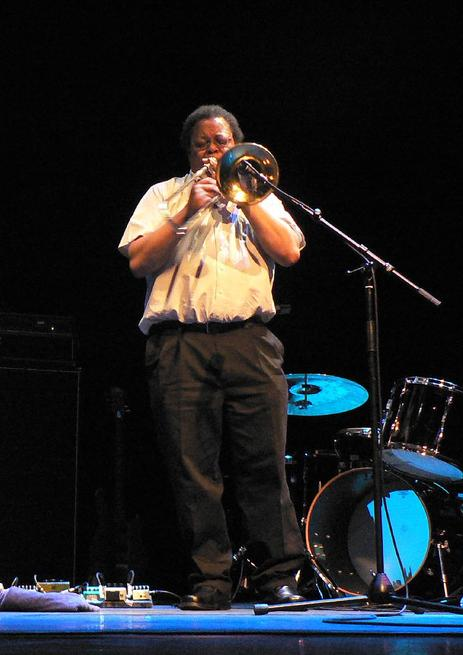
George E. Lewis in 2006.

In 1976, Lewis released Solo Trombone Record to great acclaim.

Lewis has long been active in creating and performing with interactive computer systems, most notably his software Voyager, which "listens" and reacts to live performers.

Lewis has recorded or performed with Anthony Braxton, Anthony Davis, Bertram Turetzky, Conny Bauer, Count Basie, David Behrman, David Murray, Derek Bailey, Douglas Ewart, Alfred Harth, Evan Parker, Fred Anderson, Frederic Rzewski, Gil Evans, Han Bennink, Irène Schweizer, J. D. Parran, James Newton, Joel Ryan, Joëlle Léandre, John Zorn, Karl E. H. Seigfried, Laurie Anderson, Leroy Jenkins, Marina Rosenfeld, Michel Portal, Misha Mengelberg, Miya Masaoka, Muhal Richard Abrams, Nicole Mitchell, Richard Teitelbaum, Roscoe Mitchell, Sam Rivers, Steve Lacy, and Wadada Leo Smith, as well as Frederic Rzewski and Alvin Curran's Musica Elettronica Viva and the Globe Unity Orchestra and the ICP Orchestra (Instant Composer's Pool).

In the 1980s, Lewis succeeded Rhys Chatham as the music director of The Kitchen.

From 1988 to 1990, Lewis collaborated with video artist Don Ritter to create performances of interactive music and interactive video controlled by Lewis's improvised trombone.

In 1992, Lewis collaborated with Canadian artist Stan Douglas on the video installation Hors-champs, featuring Lewis in an improvisation of Albert Ayler's "Spirits Rejoice" with musicians Douglas Ewart, Kent Carter and Oliver Johnson; the installation was featured at documenta 9 in Kassel, Germany.

Since 2004, Lewis has served as Edward H. Case Professor of American Music at Columbia University in New York City. He previously taught at the University of California, San Diego.

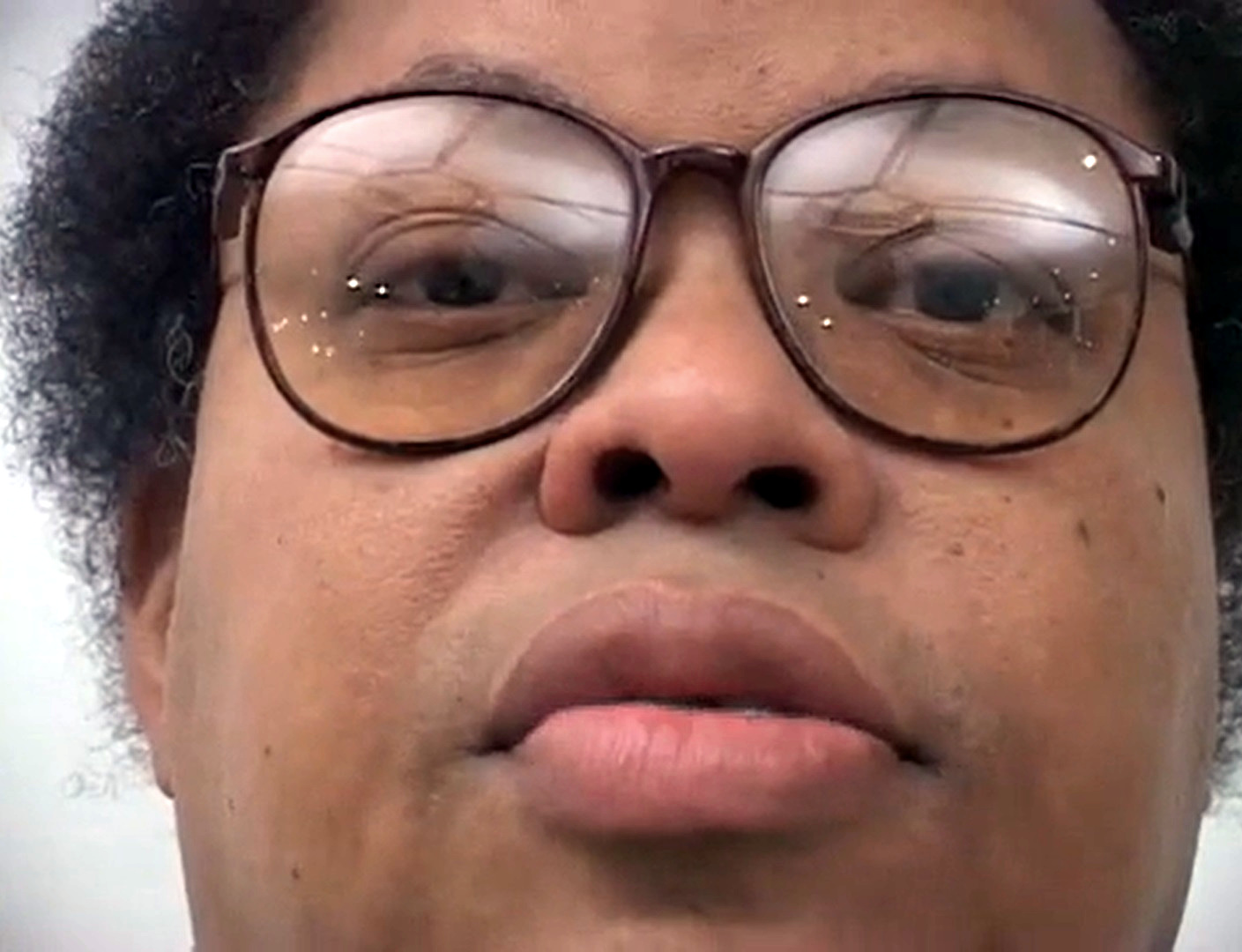
Lewis, circa 2003

Lewis is featured extensively in Unyazi of the Bushveld (2005), directed by Aryan Kaganof, a documentary about the first symposium of electronic music held in Africa. Lewis gave an invited keynote lecture and performance at NIME-06, the sixth international conference on New Interfaces for Musical Expression, which was held at IRCAM, Paris, in June 2006.

His work "Morning Blues for Yvan" was featured on the compilation album Crosstalk: American Speech Music (Bridge Records), produced by Mendi + Keith Obadike.

In 2008, Lewis published a book-length history of the AACM titled A Power Stronger Than Itself: The AACM and American Experimental Music (University of Chicago Press). Lewis later wrote an opera based on the book, titling it Afterword: The AACM (as) Opera; the work premiered at the Museum of Contemporary Art Chicago in 2015.

In April 2022, the International Contemporary Ensemble announced the appointment of Lewis as its next artistic director, effective April 2022.

== Honors and awards ==
In 2002, Lewis received a MacArthur Fellowship. His many honors also include a Guggenheim Fellowship (2015), a United States Artists Fellowship (2011), the Alpert Award in the Arts (1999), and the American Musicological Society's Music in American Culture Award in 2009. He became a Fellow of the American Academy of Arts and Sciences in 2015, a Corresponding Fellow of the British Academy in 2016, and a member of the American Academy of Arts and Letters in 2018. Lewis has received four honorary degrees: Doctor of Music from the University of Edinburgh in 2015, Doctor of Humane Letters from New College of Florida in 2017, Doctor of Music from Harvard University in 2018, and Doctor of Music from the University of Pennsylvania in 2022.

His monograph A Power Stronger Than Itself: The AACM and American Experimental Music received the 2009 American Book Award.

== Discography ==
=== As sole leader ===
Released	Album title	Label	Personnel	Rec.
1976	Solo Trombone Record	Sackville	Lewis (trombone)	1976
1978	Monads-Triple Slow Mix-Cycle-Shadowgraph, 5 (Sextet)	Black Saint	Lewis (alto and tenor trombones, sousaphone, Moog synthesizer, sound-tube), Anthony Davis, Douglas Ewart, Leroy Jenkins, Roscoe Mitchell, Adbul Wadud, Muhal Richard Abrams	1977
1979	Homage to Charles Parker	Black Saint	Lewis (trombone, electronics), Ewart, Davis, Richard Teitelbaum	1979
1981	Chicago Slow Dance	Lovely	Lewis (electronics, trombones), Ewart, J. D. Parran, Teitelbaum	1977
1993	Voyager	Avant	Lewis (trombone, computer, compositions), Roscoe Mitchell	1993
1993	Changing With the Times	New World	Lewis (trombone), Daniel Koppelman, Ruth Neville, Jerome Rothenberg, Ewart, Jeannie Cheatham, Bernard Mixon, Peter Gonzales III, Mary Oliver, Quincy Troupe	1993
2000	Endless Shout	Tzadik	Lewis (computer, conductor, trombone), Sarah Cahill, Steven Schick, Quincy Troupe, and the NOW Orchestra	1995–1997
2001	The Shadowgraph Series: Compositions for Creative Orchestra	Spool	Lewis (trombone, conductor, compositions) / The NOW Orchestra	1999
2006	Sequel (For Lester Bowie)	Intakt	Lewis (trombone, laptop, Buchla Lightning, compositions), Siegfried Rössert, Guillermo E. Brown, Jeff Parker, Kaffe Matthews, Miya Masaoka, DJ Mutamassik	2004
2011	Les Exercices Spirituels	Tzadik	Lewis (compositions, live electronic processing, live electronics and spatialization performance) with large ensembles (Ensemble Erik Satie, Wet Ink, Vancouver Olympiad)	2008–2010
2020	Rainbow Family (1984)	Carrier	Lewis (computer programming, hardware hacking), Ewart, Joëlle Léandre, Derek Bailey, Steve Lacy	1984
2021	The Recombinant Trilogy	New Focus	Works for solo instrument and electronics: Claire Chase & Levy Lorenzo, Seth Parker Woods, Dana Jessen & Eli Stine, software by Damon Holzborn	2016–2020

=== As co-leader ===
Organized by year of release; year(s) of recording noted if known to be earlier.

- 1978: Anthony Braxton / George Lewis Duo – Elements of Surprise (Moers; recorded 1976)
- 1979: George Lewis / Douglas Ewart – Jila Save! Mon. - The Imaginary Suite (Black Saint; recorded 1978)
- 1980: Company (Derek Bailey, Dave Holland, Lewis, Evan Parker) – Fables (Incus)
- 1980: Evan Parker / George Lewis – From Saxophone & Trombone (Incus; reissued on Psi (2002) and Otoroku (2023))
- 1982: Derek Bailey / George Lewis / John Zorn – Yankees (Charly)
- 1985: Misha Mengelberg / Steve Lacy / George Lewis / Harjen Gorter / Han Bennink – Change of Season (Music Of Herbie Nichols) (Soul Note)
- 1987: Mengelberg / Lacy / Lewis / Ernst Reijseger / Bennink – Dutch Masters (Soul Note)
- 1988: John Zorn / George Lewis / Bill Frisell – News for Lulu (hat Hut)
- 1992: Zorn / Lewis / Frisell – More News for Lulu (hat Hut; recorded 1989)
- 1994: Anthony Braxton & George Lewis – Donaueschingen (Duo) 1976 (hatART; recorded 1976)
- 1994: Ray Anderson, Craig Harris, Lewis, Gary Valente – Slideride (hat Hut)
- 1996: Vinny Golia / George Lewis / Bertram Turetzky – Triangulation (Nine Winds)
- 1998: George Lewis & Miya Masaoka – The Usual Turmoil and Other Duets (Music & Arts)
- 1998: George E. Lewis & Bertram Turetzky – Conversations (Incus)
- 2006: Muhal Richard Abrams / George Lewis / Roscoe Mitchell – Streaming (Pi)
- 2009: Joëlle Léandre & George Lewis – Transatlantic Visions (RogueArt)
- 2009: George Lewis / Marina Rosenfeld – Sour Mash (Innova)
- 2009: Glasgow Improvisers Orchestra & George Lewis – Metamorphic Rock (Iorram)
- 2014: George Lewis / Wadada Leo Smith / John Zorn – Sonic Rivers (Tzadik)
- 2016: George Lewis & International Contemporary Ensemble – The Will to Adorn (Tundra)
- 2016: George Lewis & Splitter Orchester – Creative Construction Set™ (Mikroton)
- 2017: Ensemble Dal Niente & George Lewis – Assemblage (New World Records)
- 2019: Kimmig-Studer-Zimmerlin & George Lewis – Kimmig-Studer-Zimmerlin & George Lewis (ezz-thetics)
- 2019: George Lewis / Roscoe Mitchell – Voyage And Homecoming (RogueArt)
- 2021: Joelle Léandre / George Lewis / Pauline Oliveros – Play as You Go (Trost; recorded 2014)

=== As sideman ===
Organized by year of release; year(s) of recording noted if known to be more than two years earlier.

With Muhal Richard Abrams

- 1979: Spihumonesty (Black Saint)
- 1980: Mama and Daddy (Black Saint)
- 2011: SoundDance (Pi)

With Anthony Braxton

- 1976: Creative Orchestra Music 1976 (Arista)
- 1977: The Montreux/Berlin Concerts (Arista)
- 1983: Four Compositions (Quartet) 1983 (Black Saint)
- 1991: Dortmund (Quartet) 1976 (hatART)
- 1992: Ensemble (Victoriaville) 1988 (Victo)
- 1995: Creative Orchestra (Köln) 1978 (hatART)
- 1999: News from the 70s (New Tone; recorded 1971–1976)
- 2000: Quintet (Basel) 1977 (hatOLOGY)
- 2011: Quartet (Graz) 1976 (Braxton Bootleg)
- 2011: Orchestra (Paris) 1978 (Braxton Bootleg)
- 2011: Orchestra (Los Angeles) 1992 (Braxton Bootleg)
- 2012: Trio (Pisa) 1982 (Braxton Bootleg)
- 2013: Quintet (Moers) 1977 - 05.30 (Braxton Bootleg)
- 2013: Quartet (Berlin) 1976 (Braxton Bootleg)

With Anthony Davis

- Episteme (Gramavision)
- Hemispheres (Gramavision)
- Variations in Dream Time (Gramavision)
- Hidden Voices (India Navigation)

With Gil Evans

- 1981: Live at the Public Theater (New York 1980) (Trio)
- 1993: Lunar Eclypse (New Tone; recorded 1981)

With Globe Unity Orchestra

- 1993: 20th Anniversary (FMP; recorded 1986)
- 2007: Globe Unity – 40 Years (Intakt)

With ICP Orchestra

- 1986: Bospaadje Konijnehol I
- 1986: ICP Plays Monk

With Steve Lacy

- 1983: Prospectus (hat ART; rereleased in 1999 as Cliches)
- 1985: Futurities (hat Hut)
- 2001: The Beat Suite (Sunnyside)
- 2004: Last Tour (Emanem)

With Roscoe Mitchell

- 1976: Roscoe Mitchell Quartet (Sackville)
- 1977: Nonaah (Nessa)
- 1978: L-R-G / The Maze / S II Examples (Nessa)
- 1979: Sketches from Bamboo (Moers)
- 1999: Nine to Get Ready (ECM)

With David Murray

- 1980: Ming (Black Saint)
- 1982: Home (Black Saint)

With Richard Teitelbaum

- 1988: Concerto Grosso (hat Hut)
- 1993: Cyberband (Moers)
- 1995: Golem (Tzadik)

With others

- 1977: Barry Altschul, You Can't Name Your Own Tune (Muse)
- 1979: Fred Anderson, Another Place (Moers)
- 1979: Jacques Bekaert, Summer Music 1970 (Lovely/Vital)
- 1979: Leo Smith Creative Orchestra, Budding of a Rose (Moers)
- 1979: Leroy Jenkins, Space Minds, New Worlds, Survival of America (Tomato)
- 1979: Sam Rivers, Contrasts (ECM)
- 1981: Material, Memory Serves (Celluloid)
- 1981: John Zorn, Archery (Parachute)
- 1981: Laurie Anderson, Big Science (Warner Bros.)
- 1982: John Lindberg Trio, Give and Take (Black Saint)
- 1983: Joëlle Leandre, Les Douze Sons (nato)
- 1983: Rhys Chatham, Factor X (Moers)
- 1985: Evan Parker (with Lewis, Barry Guy, Paul Lytton), Hook, Drift & Shuffle (Incus)
- 1986: Ushio Torikai, Go Where? (Victor)
- 1986: Irene Schweizer, Live at Taktlos (Intakt)
- 1987: Joe Sachse with David Moss, Lewis, Berlin Tango (Jazzwerkstatt)
- 1987: Heiner Goebbels, Der Mann im Fahrstuhl (ECM)
- 1988: Irene Schweizer, The Storming of the Winter Palace (Intakt)
- 1996: India Cooke, RedHanded (Music & Arts)
- 1997: Steve Coleman, Genesis & The Opening of the Way (BMG/RCA Victor)
- 1998: Evod Magek, Through Love to Freedom (Black Pot)
- 1998: Miya Masaoka Orchestra, What Is the Difference Between Stripping and Playing the Violin? (Victo)
- 1999: NOW Orchestra, WOWOW (Spool)
- 2001: Bert Turetzky & Mike Wofford, Transition and Transformation (Nine Winds)
- 2008: Musica Elettronica Viva, MEV 40 (New World)
- 2009: Paul Rutherford, Tetralogy (Emanem)

== Compositions ==
Solo and chamber music

- "Toneburst" (1976) for three trombones
- "Endless Shout" (1994), for piano
- "Collage" (1995), for poet and chamber orchestra, with text by Quincy Troupe
- "Ring Shout Ramble" (1998), for saxophone quartet
- "Signifying Riffs" (1998), for string quartet and percussion
- "Dancing in the Palace" (2009), for tenor voice and viola, with text by Donald Hall
- "Ikons" (2010), for octet
- "The Will to Adorn" (2011), for large chamber ensemble
- "Thistledown" (2012), for quartet
- "Float, Sting" (2018), for sextet

Electronics

- "Atlantic" (1978), for amplified trombones with resonant filters
- "Nightmare at the Best Western" (1992), for baritone voice and six instruments
- "Virtual Discourse" (1993), composition for infrared-controlled "virtual percussion" and four percussionists
- "North Star Boogaloo" (1996), for percussionist and computer, with text by Quincy Troupe
- "Crazy Quilt" (2002), for infrared-controlled "virtual percussion" and four percussionists
- "Hello Mary Lou" (2007) for chamber ensemble and live electronics
- "Sour Mash" (2009), composition for vinyl turntablists, with Marina Rosenfeld
- "Les Exercices Spirituels" (2010), for eight instruments and computer sound spatialization
- "Anthem" (2011), for chamber ensemble with electronics

Installations

- "Mbirascope/Algorithme et kalimba" (1985), interactive mbira-driven audiovisual installation, with David Behrman
- "A Map of the Known World" (1987), interactive mbira-driven audiovisual installation, with David Behrman
- "Rio Negro" (1992), robotic-acoustic sound-sculpture installation, with Douglas Ewart
- "Information Station No. 1" (2000), multi-screen videosonic interactive installation for the Point Loma Wastewater Treatment Plant, San Diego, Calif.
- "Rio Negro II" (2007), robotic-acoustic sound installation, with Douglas Ewart and Douglas Irving Repetto.
- "Travelogue" (2009), sound installation
- "Ikons" (2010), interactive sound sculpture, with Eric Metcalfe

Interactive computer music

- "The KIM and I" (1979), for micro-computer and improvising musician
- "Chamber Music for Humans and Non-Humans" (1980), for micro-computer and improvising musician
- "Rainbow Family" (1984), for soloists with multiple interactive computer systems
- "Voyager" (1987), for improvising soloist and interactive “virtual orchestra"
- "Virtual Concerto" (2004), for improvising computer piano soloist and orchestra
- "Interactive Trio" (2007), for interactive computer-driven piano, human pianist, and additional instrumentalist
- "Interactive Duo" (2007), for interactive computer-driven piano and human instrumentalist

Music Theatre

- "The Empty Chair" (1986), computer-driven videosonic music theatre work
- "Changing with the Times" (1991), radiophonic/music theatre work

Creative orchestra

- "The Shadowgraph Series, 1-5" (1975–77)
- "Hello and Goodbye" (1976/2000)
- "Angry Bird" (2007)
- "Fractals" (2007)
- "Shuffle" (2007)
- "The Chicken Skin II" (2007)
- "Something Like Fred" (2009)
- "Triangle" (2009)
- Minds in Flux (2021)

Graphic and instructional scores

- "Monads" (1977), graphic score for any instrumentation
- "The Imaginary Suite" (1977), two movements for tape, live electronics, and instruments
- "Chicago Slow Dance" (1977), for electro-acoustic ensemble
- "Blues" (1979), graphic score for four instruments
- "Homage to Charles Parker" (1979), for improvisors and electronics
- "Sequel" (2004), for eight electro-acoustic performers
- "Artificial Life 2007" (2007), composition for improvisors with open instrumentation

== Books and articles ==
=== Monographs ===
- Lewis, George E. (2008). A Power Stronger Than Itself: The AACM and American Experimental Music. University of Chicago Press. ISBN 9780226477039.

=== Edited collections ===
- Kisiedu, Harald; Lewis, George E., eds. (2023). Composing While Black: Afrodiasporische Neue Musik Heute / Afrodiasporic New Music Today (in German and English). Wolke Verlag. ISBN 9783955932626.
- Lewis, George E.; Piekut, Benjamin, eds. (2016). The Oxford Handbook of Critical Improvisation Studies: Volume 1. Oxford University Press. ISBN 9780195370935.
- Lewis, George E.; Piekut, Benjamin, eds. (2016). The Oxford Handbook of Critical Improvisation Studies: Volume 2. Oxford University Press. ISBN 9780190627973.

=== Articles and book chapters ===
- Lewis, George E. (2021). "'Is Our Machines Learning Yet?' Machine Learning's Challenge to Improvisation and the Aesthetic". In de Assis, Paulo; Giudici, Paolo (eds.). Machinic Assemblages of Desire: Deleuze and Artistic Research 3. Leuven: Leuven University Press. ISBN 9789461663603.
- Lewis, George E. (2020). ""Foreword: On the Art of Becoming"". In MacDonald, Raymond A.R.; Wilson, Graeme B. (eds.). The Art of Becoming: How Group Improvisation Works. Oxford: Oxford University Press. pp. vii–xx. ISBN 978-0-19-084091-4.
- Lewis, George E. (July 3, 2020). "Lifting the Cone of Silence From Black Composers". The New York Times.
- Lewis, George E. (January 2020). "A Small Act of Curation". Curating Contemporary Music (44).
- Lewis, George E.; Calico, Joy H. (Fall 2019). "Editorial Introduction". Journal of the American Musicological Society. 72 (3): 607–611. doi:10.1525/jams.2019.72.3.607.
- Lewis, George E. (Winter 2019). "Listening for Freedom with Arnold Davidson". Critical Inquiry. 45 (2): 434–447. doi:10.1086/700996. S2CID 165901758.
- Lewis, George E. (December 2018). "(Machine) Listening as Improvisation". Technosphere Magazine. 23.
- Lewis, George E. (2018). "Toni Dove's Nonmodern Ontologies". In McLendon, Matthew (ed.). Toni Dove: Embodied Machines. New York: Scala Arts Publishers & John and Mable Ringling Museum of Art. pp. 31–41.
- Lewis, George E. (2018). "Why Do We Want Our Computers to Improvise?". In McLean, Alex; Dean, Roger T. (eds.). The Oxford Handbook of Algorithmic Music. New York: Oxford University Press. pp. 123–130. ISBN 978-0-19-022699-2.
- Lewis, George E. (2017). "The Situation of a Creole (In: Defining Twentieth-and-Twenty First-Century Music)". Twentieth-Century Music. 14 (3): 442–446.
- Lewis, George E. (2017). "The Sound of Terry Adkins". In Berry, Ian (ed.). Terry Adkins: Recital. New York: Prestel Publishing. pp. 105–129.
- Lewis, George E. (2017). "From Network Bands to Ubiquitous Computing: Rich Gold and the Social Aesthetics of Interactivity". In Born, Georgina; Lewis, Eric; Straw, Will (eds.). Improvisation and Social Aesthetics. Durham and London: Duke University Press. pp. 91–109. doi:10.1215/9780822374015-005.
- Lewis, George E. (Fall 2011). "Americanist Musicology and Nomadic Noise". Journal of the American Musicological Society. 64 (3): 691–95.
- Lewis, George E. (2009). "Interactivity and Improvisation". In Dean, Roger T. (ed.). The Oxford Handbook of Computer Music. New York and Oxford: Oxford University Press. pp. 457–66. ISBN 978-0-19-971593-0.
- Lewis, George E. (May 2008). Lewis, George E. (ed.). "Foreword: After Afrofuturism". Journal of the Society for American Music. Special issue on Technology and Black Music in the Americas. 2 (2): 139–153. doi:10.1017/S1752196308080048. S2CID 194949189.
- Lewis, George E. (2008). "Stan Douglas's Suspiria: Genealogies of Recombinant Narrativity". In Douglas, Stan (ed.). Past Imperfect: Works 1986-2007. Ostfildern, Germany: Hatje Cantz Verlag. pp. 42–53. ISBN 9783775720212.
- Lewis, George E. (2007). "Improvising Tomorrow's Bodies: The Politics of Transduction". E-misférica. 4 (2).
- Lewis, George E. (2007). "Mobilitas Animi: Improvising Technologies, Intending Chance". Parallax. 13 (4): 108–122. doi:10.1080/13534640701682867. S2CID 143489398.
- Lewis, George E. (2007). "Living with Creative Machines: An Improvisor Reflects". In Everett, Anna; Wallace, Amber J. (eds.). AfroGEEKS: Beyond the Digital Divide. Santa Barbara: Center for Black Studies Research. pp. 83–99. ISBN 9780976503637.
- Lewis, George E. (May 2007). "Live Algorithms and the Future of Music". CT Watch Quarterly. 3 (2).
- Lewis, George E. (February 2007). "The Virtual Discourses of Pamela Z". Journal of the Society for American Music. 1 (1): 57–77. doi:10.1017/S1752196307070034. S2CID 194105202.
- Lewis, George E. (2006). "Improvisation and the Orchestra: A Composer Reflects". Contemporary Music Review. 25 (5/6): 429–434. doi:10.1080/07494460600989812. S2CID 194029038.
- Lewis, George E. (2005). "The Secret Love between Interactivity and Improvisation, or Missing in Interaction: A Prehistory of Computer Interactivity". In Fähndrich, Walter (ed.). Improvisation V: 14 Beiträge. Winterthur: Amadeus.
- Lewis, George E. (2004). "Gittin' to Know Y'all: Improvised Music, Interculturalism and the Racial Imagination". Critical Studies in Improvisation. 1 (1).
- Lewis, George E. "Leben mit kreativen Maschinen: Reflexionen eines improvisierenden Musikers". In Knauer, Wolfram (ed.). Improvisieren: Darmstädter Beiträge zur Jazzforschung, Band 8 (in German). Hofheim: Wolke Verlag. pp. 123–144.
- Lewis, George E. (March 30, 2004). "Afterword to "Improvised Music After 1950": The Changing Same". In Fischlin, Daniel; Heble, Ajay (eds.). The Other Side of Nowhere: Jazz, Improvisation, and Communities in Dialogue. Middletown: Wesleyan University Press. pp. 131–162. ISBN 9780819566829.
- Lewis, George E. (2000). "Too Many Notes: Computers, Complexity and Culture in 'Voyager'". Leonardo Music Journal. 10: 33–39. doi:10.1162/096112100570585. JSTOR 1513376. S2CID 57566736.
- Zorn, John, ed. (2000). "Teaching Improvised Music: An Ethnographic Memoir". Arcana: Musicians on music. New York: Granary Books. pp. 78–109.
- Lewis, George E. (Spring 1996). "Improvised Music after 1950: Afrological and Eurological Perspectives" (PDF). Black Music Research Journal. 16 (1): 91–122. doi:10.2307/779379. JSTOR 779379.
