= Jaribu Shahid =

American jazz musician

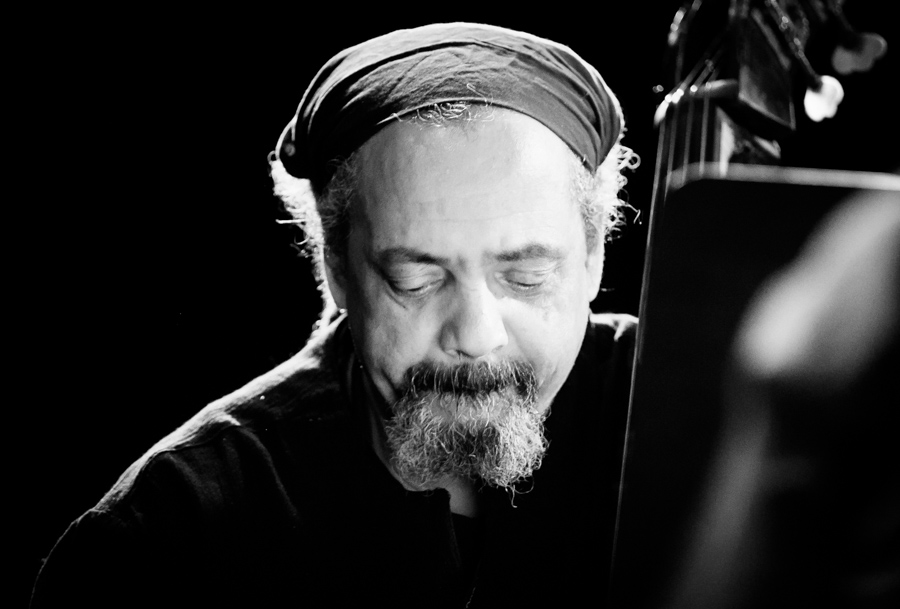
Jaribu Shahid at Kongsberg Jazzfestival in 2017

Jaribu Abdurahman Shahid (born Glenn Henderson, September 11, 1955, Detroit) is an American jazz bassist. He plays both double-bass and electric bass.

Shahid played in the band Griot Galaxy with Faruq Z. Bey in the 1970s, and became the ensemble's leader when Bey fell into a coma in 1984 after a motorcycle crash. Shahid continued leading the group in the 1990s. He was associated with the Creative Arts Collective and played in this capacity with Muhal Richard Abrams, Anthony Braxton, and Roscoe Mitchell. He played with Sun Ra in 1978 and worked extensively with Mitchell in the 1980s and 1990s, as well as with Geri Allen, James Carter, Milt Jackson, and Craig Taborn. He joined the Art Ensemble of Chicago in 2004.

== Discography ==
With Geri Allen

- Open on All Sides in the Middle (Minor Music, 1987)
- Twylight (Minor Music, 1989)

With the Art Ensemble of Chicago

- Non-Cognitive Aspects of the City (Pi, 2006)
- We Are On the Edge (Pi, 2019)
- The Sixth Decade: From Paris to Paris (RogueArt, 2023)

With James Carter

- JC on the Set (DIW/Columbia, 1994)
- Jurassic Classics (DIW/Columbia, 1995)
- The Real Quiet Storm (Atlantic, 1995)
- Conversin' with the Elders (Atlantic, 1996)
- In Carterian Fashion (Atlantic, 1998)

With Roscoe Mitchell

- Snurdy McGurdy and Her Dancin' Shoes (Nessa, 1981)
- Roscoe Mitchell and the Sound and Space Ensembles (Black Saint, 1983)
- Live at the Knitting Factory (Black Saint, 1987)
- Live In Detroit (CECMA, 1989)
- 3 x 4 Eye (Black Saint, 1991)
- This Dance Is for Steve McCall (Black Saint, 1993)
- Nine to Get Ready (ECM, 1999)
- The Bad Guys (Around Jazz, 2000 [2003])
- Song for My Sister (Pi, 2002)
- Composition/Improvisation Nos. 1, 2 & 3 (ECM, 2004 [2007])
- Turn (RogueArt, 2005)
- Far Side (ECM, 2007 [2010])
- Bells for the South Side (ECM, 2017)

With David Murray

- Octet Plays Trane (Justin Time, 2000)
- Gwotet (Justin Time, 2004)
- Waltz Again (Justin Time, 2002 [2005])

With Evan Parker

- Boustrophedon (ECM, 2004 [2007])

With Strata Institute

- Cipher Syntax (JMT, 1989)

With the World Saxophone Quartet

- M'Bizo (Justin Time, 1999)

With Hugh Ragin

- An Afternoon in Harlem (Justin Time, 1999)
- Fanfare & Fiesta (Justin Time, 2001)
- Feel the Sunshine (Justin Time, 2002)
