= Douglas Ewart =

American musician (born 1946)

- Born: Douglas R. Ewart; 13 September 1946 (age 79); Kingston, Jamaica
- Occupations: Composer, Instrumentalist, Instrument Builder, Educator, Community Builder, Philosopher, Writer
- Instruments: Sopranino saxophone; Alto saxophone; Clarinet; Bassoon; Didgeridoo; English horn; Flute; Bamboo flutes; Rastafarian hand drums
- Website: www.douglasewart.com

Douglas R. Ewart (born 13 September 1946 in Kingston, Jamaica) is a Jamaican multi-instrumentalist and instrument builder. He plays sopranino and alto saxophones, clarinets, bassoon, flute, bamboo flutes (shakuhachi, ney, and panpipes), and didgeridoo; as well as Rastafarian hand drums (nyabingi, repeater, and bass).

Ewart emigrated to the United States in June 1963 (coming to Chicago) and became associated with the Association for the Advancement of Creative Musicians (AACM) in 1967, studying with Joseph Jarman and Roscoe Mitchell. He served as that organization's president from 1979 to 1986.

He has performed or recorded with J. D. Parran, Muhal Richard Abrams, Art Ensemble of Chicago, Anthony Braxton, Alvin Curran, Anthony Davis, Robert Dick, Von Freeman, Joseph Jarman, Amina Claudine Myers, Roscoe Mitchell, James Newton, Rufus Reid, Wadada Leo Smith, Cecil Taylor, Richard Teitelbaum, Henry Threadgill, Hamid Drake, Don Byron, Malachi Favors Maghostut, and George Lewis.

In 1992, Ewart collaborated with Canadian artist Stan Douglas on the video installation Hors-champs which was featured at documenta 9 in Kassel, Germany. The installation features Ewart in an improvisation of Albert Ayler's "Spirits Rejoice" with musicians George Lewis, Kent Carter and Oliver Johnson.

He has lived in Minneapolis, Minnesota since 1990. His father, Tom, was a cricket umpire.

== Discography ==
=== As leader ===
- Douglas R. Ewart and Inventions Clarinet Choir: Red Hills (Aarawak, 1983)
- Douglas R. Ewart and Inventions: Bamboo Forest (Aarawak, 1990)
- Douglas R. Ewart: Bamboo Meditations At Banff (Aarawak, 1994)
- Douglas R. Ewart and Inventions Clarinet Choir: Angles of Entrance (Aarawak, 1998)
- Douglas R. Ewart and Inventions Clarinet Choir: Newbeings (Aarawak, 2001)
- Douglas R. Ewart: Songs Of Sunlife - Inside The Didjeridu (Innova, 2003)
- Douglas R. Ewart and Inventions: Velvet Fire: Dedicated to Baba Fred Anderson (Aarawak, 2009)
- Nyahbingi Drum Choir: Velvet Drum Meditations (Aarawak, 2010)

=== As Collaborator ===
With Muhal Richard Abrams

- Lifea Blinec (Arista/Novus, 1978)

With Spencer Barefield and Tani Tabbal

- Beneath Detroit- The Creative Arts Collective Concerts At The Detroit Institute Of Arts 1979-1992 (Geodesic, 2010)

With Anthony Braxton

- For Trio (Arista, 1978)

With Jean-Luc Cappozzo, Joëlle Léandre, Bernard Santacruz, Michael Zerang

- Sonic Communion (The Bridge Sessions, 2015)

With Chico Freeman

- Morning Prayer (Whynot, 1976)

With Dennis González

- Namesake (Silkheart, 1987)

With Yusef Lateef, Roscoe Mitchell, Adam Rudolph

- Voice Prints (Meta Records, 2013)

With George Lewis

- Shadowgraph (Black Saint, 1978)
- Homage to Charles Parker (Black Saint, 1979)
- Jila Save! Mon. - The Imaginary Suite (Black Saint, 1979)
- Chicago Slow Dance (Lovely Music, 1981)

With Roscoe Mitchell

- L-R-G / The Maze / S II Examples (Nessa Records, 1978)
- Sketches from Bamboo (Moers Music, 1979)

With Wadada Leo Smith

- Budding of a Rose (Moers Music, 1979)

With Henry Threadgill

- X-75 Volume 1 (Arista/Novus, 1979)
