= This Dance Is for Steve McCall =

Studio album by Roscoe Mitchell
- Released: 1993
- Recorded: May 18, 1992
- Studio: Sorcerer Sound, New York City
- Genre: Jazz
- Length: 51:03
- Label: Black Saint
- Producer: Flavio Bonandrini

Roscoe Mitchell chronology
Duets & Solos (1993)	This Dance Is for Steve McCall (1993)	Hey Donald (1994)

This Dance Is for Steve McCall is an album by American jazz saxophonist Roscoe Mitchell which was recorded in 1992 and released on the Italian Black Saint label.

== Background ==
The record marks the debut of the Note Factory, an outgrowth of the Sound Ensemble, bassist Jaribu Shahid and drummer Tani Tabbal come from that group, while another drummer, Vincent Davis, performed on Mitchell's Songs in the Wind. This was the first Mitchell's recording with pianist Matthew Shipp and bassist William Parker.

The album is a tribute to drummer Steve McCall, who died in 1989 and whose last recording with Mitchell was The Flow of Things, and contains dedications to close collaborators who died in 1992, Phillip Wilson, the drummer of the pre-Art Ensemble Roscoe Mitchell Quartet, and Gerald Oshita, a composer proponent of unusual ultra-low registered wind instruments, and partner with Mitchell in his Space Ensemble.

== Reception ==
Professional ratings
Review scores
Source	Rating
AllMusic	3/5 stars
The Penguin Guide to Jazz	2.5/4 stars

In his review for AllMusic, Al Campbell states "The music ranges from dense contemporary classical to violence incarnate on 'The Rodney King Affair', in which Mitchell's circular-breathing technique pushes the tempo to a dizzy, frightening place." The Penguin Guide to Jazz says that "several of the nine pieces sound half-realized or foreshortened, with the bass and percussion textures unclear."

== Track listing ==
All compositions by Roscoe Mitchell except as indicated

1. "Ericka" (Joseph Jarman)– 11:32
2. "Uptown Strut" – 2:19
3. "The Rodney King Affair" – 5:24
4. "Ah" – 3:21
5. "Song for Gerald Oshita" – 3:03
6. "Paintings for Phillip Wilson" – 2:58
7. "The Far East Blues" – 5:34
8. "Variations for String Bass and Piano" – 6:56
9. "This Dance Is for Steve McCall" – 9:56

== Personnel ==
- Roscoe Mitchell - soprano sax, alto sax, tenor sax, bamboo flute, percussion
- Matthew Shipp – piano
- Jaribu Shahid – bass
- William Parker – bass, percussion
- Tani Tabbal – drums, hand drums
- Vincent Davis – drums
