= Tani Tabbal =

Jazz drummer

- Genres: Jazz, world fusion
- Occupation: Musician
- Instrument: Drums
- Formerly of: Griot Galaxy
- Website: tanitabbal.com

Tani Tabbal is a jazz drummer who has worked with Roscoe Mitchell, David Murray, and Cassandra Wilson.

== Biography ==
By the age of 14 Tabbal was playing professionally, performing with Oscar Brown Jr. In his teens he also performed with Phil Cohran and the Sun Ra Arkestra.

Tabbal has recorded, performed and toured with a wide range of musicians, including Roscoe Mitchell, Anthony Braxton, Oliver Lake, Muhal Richard Abrams, Henry Threadgill, Richard Davis, David Murray, James Carter, Geri Allen, Karl Berger, Evan Parker, Leroy Jenkins, Milt Jackson, Jackie McLean, Dewey Redman and Cassandra Wilson.

He was also an integral part of the rhythm section of Detroit group Griot Galaxy, along with bassist Jaribu Shahid. In addition, he was in the percussion ensemble "Pieces of Time" along with Andrew Cyrille, Famoudou Don Moye, and Obo Addy.

In 2001 he was successfully treated for a brain tumour.

In 2007, Tani released a solo percussion CD, entitled Before Time After.

== Discography ==
=== As co-leader ===
With Griot Galaxy

- Kins (Black and White, 1982)
- Opus Krampus (Sound Aspect, 1985)
- Live at the D.I.A. (Entropy, 2003; recorded 1983)

With Barefield-Holland-Tabbal Trio (Spencer Barefield and Anthony Holland)

- Transdimensional Space Window (Trans-African, 1982; reissued on Geodesic)
- Live at Nickelsdorfer Konfrontationen (Sound Aspects, 1986)

With Douglas Ewart and Spencer Barefield

- Ewart-Barefield-Tabbal Trio (Geodesic)

With John Lindberg and Rahman Jamaal as JazzHopRevolution

- Tha Sound of Truth (Planet Arts)

=== As sideman ===
With Geri Allen

- Open on All Sides in the Middle (Minor Music, 1987)
- Twylight (Minor Music, 1989)
- Maroons (Blue Note, 1992)

With Spencer Barefield

- Xenogenesis 2000 (CAC/Xenogenesis, 1992; recorded 1990)
- Live-Detroit (CAC/Xenogenesis, 1998)

With Karl Berger

- Stillpoint (Double Moon, 2002)

With James Carter Quartet

- JC on the Set (DIW, 1993)
- Jurassic Classics (DIW, 1994)
- The Real Quiet Storm (Atlantic, 1995)
- Conversin' with the Elders (Atlantic, 1996)
- In Carterian Fashion (Atlantic, 1998)

With Steve Coleman and Greg Osby as Strata Institute

- Cipher Syntax (JMT, 1989)

With Joe Giardullo

- Shadow and Light (Drimila, 2002)
- Now Is (Drimala, 2003)

With Leroy Jenkins

- The New Chamber Jazz Quintet (Geodesic)

With John Menegon

- Search Light Featuring Dewey Redman (Jazz in the Mountains, 2004)
- Soul Advice (Jazz in the Mountains, 2005)

With Roscoe Mitchell

- Snurdy McGurdy and Her Dancin' Shoes (Nessa, 1981)
- 3 x 4 Eye (Black Saint, 1981)
- More Cutouts (Cecma, 1981)
- Roscoe Mitchell and the Sound and Space Ensembles (Black Saint, 1984)
- Sound Ensemble Live in Detroit (Cecma, 1989)
- Live at the Knitting Factory (Black Saint, 1990; recorded 1987)
- This Dance Is for Steve McCall (Black Saint, 1993)
- Nine to Get Ready (ECM, 1999)
- The Bad Guys (Around Jazz, 2000)
- Turn (RogueArt, 2005)
- Composition/Improvisation Nos. 1, 2 & 3 (ECM, 2007; recorded 2004)
- Far Side (ECM, 2010; recorded 2007)
- Bells for the South Side (ECM, 2017)

With David Murray

- Remembrances (DIW, 1991)
- David Murray Big Band conducted by Lawrence "Butch" Morris (DIW, 1991)
- David Murray Octet – Picasso (DIW, 1993)
- David Murray Big Band – South of the Border (DIW, 1993)

With Evan Parker and the Transatlantic Art Ensemble

- Boustrophedon (ECM, 2008; recorded 2004)

With Hugh Ragin

- Feel the Sunshine (Justin Time, 2002)

With The Real ShooBee Doo (a.k.a. Reggie Fields)

- Reminiscing (Wenha, 1981)
- Good to Go (Wenha, 1983)

With Ray Spiegel

- Raga Jazz Ray Spiegel Ensemble (Simla House)

With Sun Ra Arkestra

- Beyond the Purple Star Zone (Saturn, 1981)
- Dual Change (Saturn)

With Craig Taborn

- Craig Taborn Trio (DIW, 1994)

With Rod Williams

- Hanging in the Balance (Muse, 1989)
- Destiny Express (Muse, 1993)

With Cassandra Wilson

- She Who Weeps (JMT, 1991)
