= Far Side (disambiguation) =

The Far Side is a comic strip by Gary Larson.

Far Side may also refer to:

- Gary Larson's Tales from the Far Side, a 1994 television special based on Larson's comic strip
- Far Side (album), a 2010 album by Roscoe Mitchell and the Note Factory
- Farside (band), melodic hardcore band
- The Pharcyde, an alternative hip hop act
- The Far Side, a play by Courttia Newland

== See also ==
- Far side of the Moon, the hemisphere of Earth's moon that is oriented away from the Earth
- Far Side of the Moon (film), a 2003 Canadian film by Robert Lepage
