= Sketches from Bamboo =

Studio album by Roscoe Mitchell
- Released: 1979
- Recorded: June 1979
- Studio: Palm Studio, Paris
- Genre: Free jazz
- Label: Moers Music; 02024
- Producer: Burkhard Hennen

Roscoe Mitchell chronology
L-R-G / The Maze / S II Examples (1978)	Sketches from Bamboo (1979)	Snurdy McGurdy and Her Dancin' Shoes (1981)

Sketches from Bamboo is an album by saxophonist Roscoe Mitchell. It was recorded in June 1979 at Palm Studio in Paris, and was released on LP later that year by Moers Music. On the album, Mitchell is joined by members of a large ensemble known as the Roscoe Mitchell Creative Orchestra.

== Reception ==
Professional ratings
Review scores
Source	Rating
AllMusic	3/5 stars
The Encyclopedia of Popular Music	3/5 stars
The Penguin Guide to Jazz	3/4 stars

In a review for AllMusic, Brian Olewnick wrote that Mitchell "splits the date between two of his notable predilections: the abstract and the funky. The former is represented in the two variations on the title theme that utilize the horns to develop spare, pointillistic patterns that emerge into and then escape out of drone-like textures... Both are fairly successful ventures into structurally balancing composition and improvisation for a large group... 'Linefine Lyon Seven' is... good, ragged fun with the composer up front on alto... Sketches from Bamboo is worth seeking out for the Mitchell fan, although newcomers can gain easier access elsewhere."

The authors of the Penguin Guide to Jazz Recordings stated: "The first 'Sketches' is a compelling, slowly collecting composite of horn lines and the second seeks to amplify that tendency into what is, at the end, a vast, swirling collage that is nevertheless very precisely directed and sustained... for the vividness of the first two tracks, this is well worth having."

== Track listing ==
Composed by Roscoe Mitchell.

=== Side A ===
1. "Sketches From Bamboo - Cyp I" – 13:17
2. "Linefinelyon Seven" – 10:15

=== Side B ===
1. "Sketches From Bamboo - Cyp II" – 13:49

== Personnel ==
- Roscoe Mitchell – alto saxophone
- Anthony Braxton – reeds
- Douglas Ewart – reeds
- Wallace McMillan – reeds
- Dwight Andrews – reeds
- Marty Ehrlich – reeds
- Leo Smith – trumpet
- Kenny Wheeler – trumpet
- Hugh Ragin – trumpet
- Mike Mossman – trumpet
- Rob Howard – trumpet
- George Lewis – trombone
- Ray Anderson – trombone
- Alfred Patterson – trombone
- Pinguin Moschner – tuba
- Marilyn Crispell – piano
- Bobby Naughton – vibraphone
- Wes Brown – bass
- Pheeroan akLaff – drums, percussion
