= Michael Philip Mossman =

American jazz trumpeter (born 1959)

- Born: October 12, 1959 (age 65); Philadelphia, Pennsylvania, U.S.
- Genres: Jazz
- Occupation: Musician
- Instrument: Trumpet
- Years active: 1980s–present

Michael Philip Mossman (born October 12, 1959) is an American jazz trumpeter.

== Career ==
Mossman's early career included a tour of Europe with Anthony Braxton in 1978 and tours with Roscoe Mitchell in the early 1980s. He also did session work in the 1980s, for Styx among others. He played with Lionel Hampton, Art Blakey's Jazz Messengers, and Machito before joining the Blue Note Records ensemble Out of the Blue in 1985.

In 1986 he performed with the Naumburg Orchestral Concerts, in the Naumburg Bandshell, Central Park, in the summer series.

Following this he worked with Toshiko Akiyoshi, Horace Silver (1989–1991), Gerry Mulligan (1992), Dizzy Gillespie, Slide Hampton, Michel Camilo, Bobby Sanabria, Mario Bauza, Eddie Palmieri, and the Philip Morris Superband.

In 2019, Mossman wrote the arrangements for pianist Michel Camilo on the album Essence which also features Michael as trumpet soloist. Mossman received a Grammy nomination in 2013 for Best Instrumental Arrangement for his "Afro-Cuban Jazz Suite for Ellington" recorded on Bobby Sanabria's double Grammy nominated album Multiverse. His work with Academy Award-winning director Fernando Trueba includes scoring music for the Academy Award nominated (2012) film Chico and Rita.

Mossman has been a guest performer, arranger, and conductor with radio orchestras in Germany. He has conducted the Bilbao Orkesta Sinfonica in Spain in a program of his own works. He arranged and conducted "Mambo Nights" with Arturo Sandoval and "Missa Afro-Cubana" with the WDR Bigband of Cologne and Spirits Dancing with David Sanborn with the HR Bigband of Frankfurt (2009). "Latin Jazz Latino" with Joe Gallardo was recorded by the NDR Bigband of Hamburg and released by Skip Records (2006). His ballet Beneath the Mask was performed at Harris Theater in Chicago by Jon Faddis and the Chicago Jazz Ensemble and the Deeply Rooted Dance Company in 2006. His arrangement of Faddis' "Teranga" was performed by the Philadelphia Orchestra at Kimmel Center in 2006. His trumpet playing was featured on the Grammy nominated release Afro-Cuban Dream: Live & In Clave (2000) as well as his original composition and arrangement, "57th St. Mambo," on the Grammy nominated release, Big Band Urban Folktales (2007), both with the Bobby Sanabria Big Band. His arrangement of Paquito D'Rivera's "I Remember Diz" was performed by the Louisiana Philharmonic in 2010. He has arranged for the Tri-City Symphony of Davenport, Iowa (2011). His "Latin Tinge" was performed at Kennedy Center in Washington, D.C., with Paquito D'Rivera and the Quartet Indigo string quartet in 2010.

Mossman is Director of Jazz Studies at the Aaron Copland School of Music at Queens College/CUNY and is also on the faculty of the Juilliard School in New York City.

== Discography ==
=== As leader ===
- Granulat with Daniel Schnyder (Red, 1991)
- Mama Soho (TCB, 1998)
- The Orisha Suite (Connector Music, 2001)
- Visitatio Sepulchri De Gandia with Jesus Santandreu, Toni Belenguer, Santi Navalon, Julio Fuster, Juanjo Garcera, Vicente Perez (2010)

=== With Out of the Blue ===
- O.T.B. (Blue Note, 1985) – with Kenny Garrett, Ralph Bowen, Harry Pickens, Robert Hurst and Ralph Peterson, Jr.
- Inside Track (Blue Note, 1986)
- Live at Mt. Fuji (Blue Note, 1987) – with Kenny Garrett, Ralph Bowen, Harry Pickens, Ralph Peterson, Jr. and Kenny Davis
- Spiral Staircase (Blue Note, 1989) – with Ralph Bowen, Kenny Davis, Steve Wilson, Renee Rosnes and Billy Drummond

=== As sideman ===
With Franco Ambrosetti

- Tentets (Enja, 1985)
- Gin and Pentatonic (Enja, 1992)

With Ray Barretto

- My Summertime (Owl, 1995)
- Contact! (Blue Note, 1997)

With Michel Camilo

- On the Other Hand (Epic, 1990)
- Amo Tu Cama Rica (Epic, 1991)
- One More Once (Columbia, 1994)
- Caribe (Calle 54, 2009)
- Essence (Sony, 2019)

With George Gruntz

- First Prize (Enja, 1989)
- Blues 'n' Dues et Cetera (Enja, 1991)

With Jimmy Heath

- Turn Up the Heath (Planet Arts, 2006)
- Togetherness: Live at the Blue Note (Jazz Legacy, 2013)

With Bob Mintzer

- Departure (DMP, 1993)
- Big Band Trane (DMP, 1996)
- Latin from Manhattan (DMP, 1998)
- Homage to Count Basie (DMP, 2000)
- Gently (DMP, 2002)
- Live at MCG (MCG Jazz, 2004)

With Roscoe Mitchell

- Sketches from Bamboo (Moers Music, 1979)
- Roscoe Mitchell and the Sound and Space Ensembles (Black Saint, 1984)

With Arturo O'Farrill

- Una Noche Inolvidable (Palmetto, 2005)
- Song for Chico (Zoho, 2008)

With Tito Puente

- Special Delivery (Concord Jazz, Picante, 1996)
- Oye Como Va!: The Dance Collection (Concord Picante, 1997)

With Bobby Sanabria

- Afro-Cuban Dream...Live & in Clave!!! (Arabesque, 2000)
- Big Band Urban Folktales (Jazzheads, 2007)

With Daniel Schnyder

- The City (Enja, 1989)
- Decoding the Message (Enja, 1990)
- Mythology (Enja, 1991)
- Nucleus (Enja, 1995)
- Tarantula (Enja, 1996)

With others

- Anthony Braxton, Creative Orchestra (Köln) 1978 (hat ART, 1995)
- Al Di Meola, The Grande Passion (Telarc, 2000)
- Benny Carter, Harlem Renaissance (MusicMasters, 1992)
- Chaka Khan, Destiny (Warner Bros., 1986)
- Freddy Cole, Rio de Janeiro Blue (Telarc, 2001)
- Color Me Badd, Time and Chance (Giant 1993)
- Dwayne Dolphin, Portrait of Adrian (Minor Music, 1994)
- Kenny Drew Jr., Crystal River (TCB 1998)
- Robin Eubanks, Different Perspectives (Bamboo, 1988)
- Joe Gallardo, NDR Big Band, Latin Jazz Latino (Skip, 2005)
- Gene Harris, Live at Town Hall, N.Y.C. (Concord Jazz, 1989)
- Nancy Harrow, Winter Dreams (Artists House, 2003)
- Antonio Hart, All We Need (Downtown Sound, 2004)
- Joe Henderson, Big Band (Verve, 1996)
- Nino Josele, Espanola (DRO, 2009)
- Bernard Lavilliers, Clair-Obscur (Barclay, 1997)
- John Lindberg, Trilogy of Works for Eleven Instrumentalists (Black Saint, 1985)
- Kevin Mahogany, Songs and Moments (Enja, 1994)
- Pat Metheny, Secret Story (Geffen, 1992)
- Chico O'Farrill, Carambola (Milestone, 2000)
- Tom Pierson, Planet of Tears (Auteur, 1996)
- Daniel Ponce, Chango Te Llama (Mango 1991)
- Horace Silver, Rockin' with Rachmaninoff (Bop City, 2003)
- Leo Smith, Budding of a Rose (Moers Music, 1979)
- Styx, Kilroy Was Here (A&M, 1983)
- Bross Townsend, I Love Jump Jazz (Claves, 1995)
- Bebo Valdes, Suite Cubana (Calle 54, 2009)
- Joe Zawinul, My People (JMS, 1996)

=== Film credits ===
- Me Amo Tu Cama Rica (1992) directed by Emilio Martinez Lazaro
- Two Much (1995) directed by Fernando Trueba
- Wise Guys (1996) directed by Brian de Palma
- Bossa Nova (2000) directed by Bruno Baretto
- Calle 54 (2000) directed by Fernando Trueba
- Chico and Rita (2011) directed by Fernando Trueba
