= For Trio =

Studio album by Anthony Braxton
- Released: 1978
- Recorded: September 22, 1977
- Studio: Streeterville Sound in Chicago, IL
- Genre: Jazz
- Length: 41:18
- Label: Arista AB-4181
- Producer: Michael Cuscuna

Anthony Braxton chronology
Quintet (Basel) 1977 (1977)	For Trio (1978)	Creative Orchestra (Köln) 1978 (1978)

For Trio is an album by American jazz saxophonist and composer Anthony Braxton recorded in 1977 and released on the Arista label. The album features two recordings of the same composition by Braxton in two separate trios and was subsequently included on The Complete Arista Recordings of Anthony Braxton released by Mosaic Records in 2008.

== Reception ==
The Allmusic review by Brian Olewnick awarded the album 2½ stars stating "The extremely high caliber of the musicians which Braxton chose for this project guarantee some inspired playing and great imagination in working their way through this often forbidding territory. While admirers of his more jazz oriented work might find the music here daunting indeed, it repays careful listening and also strikes one as a seminal work that prefigures many of the concerns he would deal with later on in his collage-form structures written for his classic quartet of the '80s and '90s".

Professional ratings
Review scores
Source	Rating
Allmusic	2.5/5 stars

== Track listing ==
All compositions by Anthony Braxton.

1. "Composition 76: Version I" - 20:56
2. "Composition 76: Version II" - 20:22

== Personnel ==
- Anthony Braxton - piccolo, flute, soprano clarinet, clarinet, contra-alto clarinet, contrabass clarinet, soprano saxophone, alto saxophone, contrabass saxophone, tragata, gongs, percussion, little instruments
- Henry Threadgill - flute, bass flute, alto saxophone, tenor saxophone, baritone saxophone, clarinet, Hub "T" Wall, gongs, percussion, little instruments (track 1)
- Douglas Ewart - piccolo, flute, soprano clarinet, clarinet, bass clarinet, soprano saxophones, alto saxophone, bassoon, Ewartphone, gongs, percussion, little instruments (track 1)
- Roscoe Mitchell - piccolo, flute, clarinet, soprano saxophone, alto saxophone, tenor saxophone, baritone saxophone, bass saxophone, gongs, percussion, little instruments (track 2)
- Joseph Jarman - flute, clarinet, alto clarinet, bass clarinet, soprano saxophone, alto saxophone, baritone saxophone, bass saxophone, vibraphone, gongs, percussion, little instruments (track 2)
