= Bells for the South Side =

Live album by Roscoe Mitchell
- Released: 2017
- Recorded: September 2015
- Venue: Museum of Contemporary Art, Chicago
- Genre: Jazz
- Length: 2:07:18
- Labels: ECM; ECM 2494/95
- Producer: Steve Lake

Roscoe Mitchell chronology
Four Ways (2017)	Bells for the South Side (2017)

Bells for the South Side is a double album by American jazz saxophonist Roscoe Mitchell, which was recorded live in 2015 at Museum of Contemporary Art, Chicago in the context of The Freedom Principle, a 50th-anniversary exhibition devoted to the Association for the Advancement of Creative Musicians, and released on ECM.

== Reception ==
Professional ratings
Review scores
Source	Rating
AllMusic	4.5/5 stars
Down Beat	4/5 stars

In his review for AllMusic, Thom Jurek states, "Bells for the South Side is indeed massive, but its depth, breadth, and inspired performances border on the profound."

The Down Beat review by Bradley Bambarger says, "Pitched between avant-garde jazz and modernist chamber music, the sound poems of Bells for the South Side challenge the ear, whether they are keening or swirling, spare or textured. But the music also has an undeniable grandeur, the feel almost ritualistic."

The Point of Departure review by Michael Rosenstein states, "This release is a tour de force in Mitchell’s impressive catalog and the result is a tribute to his singular vision and sage choice in collaborators."

== Track listing ==
All tracks are written by Roscoe Mitchell except where noted.

Disc one
No.	Title	Writer(s)	Length
1.	"Spatial Aspects of the Sound"		12:14
2.	"Panoply"		7:36
3.	"Prelude to a Rose"		12:44
4.	"Dancing in the Canyon"	Roscoe Mitchell; Craig Taborn; Kikanju Baku	10:23
5.	"EP 7849"		8:13
6.	"Bells for the South Side"		12:26

Disc two
No.	Title	Length
1.	"Prelude to the Card Game, Cards for Drums, and the Final Hand"	16:03
2.	"The Last Chord"	12:26
3.	"Six Gongs and Two Woodblocks"	7:50
4.	"R509A Twenty B"	1:34
5.	"Red Moon in the Sky / Odwalla"	25:49

== Personnel ==
- Roscoe Mitchell – sopranino, soprano sax, alto sax, bass sax, flute, piccolo, bass recorder, percussion
- James Fei – sopranino sax, alto sax, contra-alto clarinet, electronics
- Hugh Ragin – trumpet, piccolo trumpet
- Tyshawn Sorey – trombone, piano, drums, percussion
- Craig Taborn – piano, organ, electronics
- Jaribu Shahid – double bass, bass guitar, percussion
- William Winant – percussion, tubular bells, glockenspiel, vibraphone, marimba, roto toms, cymbals, bass drum, woodblocks, timpani
- Kikanju Baku – drums, percussion
- Tani Tabbal – drums, percussion
