= Homage to Charles Parker =

Studio album by George Lewis
- Released: 1979
- Recorded: 1979
- Studio: Barigozzi (Milan)
- Genre: Avant-garde jazz
- Length: 35:37
- Label: Black Saint
- Producer: Giaocomo Pellicciotti

George Lewis chronology
| George Lewis – Douglas Ewart (1978) | Homage to Charles Parker (1979) | From Saxophone & Trombone (1980) |

Homage to Charles Parker is a 1979 album by American trombonist and composer George E. Lewis. It was recorded for the Italian Black Saint label.

== Reception ==
Professional ratings
Review scores
| Source | Rating |
|---|---|
| AllMusic | 5 /5 stars |
| The Penguin Guide to Jazz | 👑 |
| The Rolling Stone Jazz Record Guide | 5 /5 stars |

The AllMusic review by Michael G. Nastos called Homage to Charles Parker "a statement unique in creative jazz and unto itself" and "a magnum opus for [Lewis]".

== Track listing ==
All compositions by George Lewis

1. "Blues" - 17:42
2. "Homage to Charles Parker" - 17:55

== Personnel ==
- George Lewis – trombone, electronics
- Douglas Ewart – bass clarinet, alto saxophone, cymbals
- Anthony Davis – piano
- Richard Teitelbaum – Polymoog, Multimoog, and Micromoog synthesizers
