= Creative Orchestra (Köln) 1978 =

Live album by Anthony Braxton
- Released: 1995
- Recorded: May 12, 1978
- Venue: Großer Sendesaal WDR in Köln, Germany
- Genre: Jazz
- Length: 104:25
- Label: hatART 2-6171
- Producer: Manfred Niehaus

Anthony Braxton chronology
| For Trio (1977) | Creative Orchestra (Köln) 1978 (1995) | For Four Orchestras (1978) |

Creative Orchestra (Köln) 1978 is a live album by American composer and saxophonist Anthony Braxton. Recorded in Germany in 1978 but not released on the hatART label until 1995, the album features a live concert featuring several of Braxton's compositions that were first recorded on Creative Orchestra Music 1976.

== Reception ==
Professional ratings
Review scores
| Source | Rating |
|---|---|
| Allmusic | 4.5/5 stars |
| All About Jazz | 3.5/5 stars |
| All About Jazz | 4/5 stars |

The Allmusic review by Scott Yanow awarded the album 4½ stars stating "The music is often dense and atonal but never dull, and the closing composition is a superb piece that displays Braxton's love of marching band music! Although one wishes that Anthony Braxton himself had played, this is a set easily recommended to his fans". On All About Jazz, Jeff Stockton said "Those curious about Braxton but discouraged by the sheer number of recordings available may find this the place to start. Most of Braxton's work falls into two categories—more difficult and less difficult—but these 100 minutes of music are decidedly in the latter category. Braxton is among a handful of jazz composers whose music is part of the graduate-level course in the avant-garde" and Troy Collins noted "Creative Orchestra (Koln) 1978 is an endlessly intriguing concert recording that warrants repeated spins, offering new surprises with each listen".

== Track listing ==
All compositions by Anthony Braxton

Disc one

1. "Language Improvisations" – 14:34
2. "Composition 55" – 12:27
3. "Composition 45" – 25:21

Disc two

1. "Composition 59" – 21:45
2. "Composition 51" – 17:19
3. "Composition 58" – 12:56

== Personnel ==
- Anthony Braxton – conductor
- Dwight Andrews, Marty Ehrlich, Vinny Golia, J. D. Parran, Ned Rothenberg – saxophones, clarinets, flutes, piccolo
- Rob Howard, Michael Mossman, Leo Smith, Kenny Wheeler – trumpet
- Ray Anderson, George E. Lewis, James King Roosa – trombones, tuba
- Marilyn Crispell – piano
- Birgit Taubhorn – accordion
- Bobby Naughton – vibraphone
- James Emery – electric guitar
- John Lindberg, Brian Smith – bass
- Thurman Barker – percussion, marimba
- Robert Ostertag – synthesizer
