= Hey Donald =

Studio album by Roscoe Mitchell
- Released: 1995
- Recorded: May 23, 24 & 25, 1994
- Studio: Riverside Studios, Chicago
- Genre: Jazz
- Length: 49:26
- Label: Delmark
- Producer: Robert G. Koester

Roscoe Mitchell chronology
This Dance Is for Steve McCall (1993)	Hey Donald (1995)	First Meeting (1995)

Hey Donald is an album by the American jazz saxophonist Roscoe Mitchell, recorded in 1994 and released on Delmark. It was the first recording by a quartet featuring pianist Jodie Christian, bassist Malachi Favors and drummer Albert "Tootie" Heath. The album is dedicated to Earth Wind & Fire saxophonist Donald Myrick.

== Reception ==
Professional ratings
Review scores
Source	Rating
AllMusic	4.5/5 stars
The Penguin Guide to Jazz	2.5/4 stars

In his review for AllMusic, Scott Yanow states: "In general Mitchell saves the more boppish pieces for his tenor while on soprano his intense sound creates a drone effect reminiscent a bit of bagpipes."

The Penguin Guide to Jazz notes that "when the rhythm section are playing straight time and setting up a groove underneath, Mitchell's honking and mordant saxophone often sounds frankly ludicrous."

== Track listing ==
All compositions by Roscoe Mitchell except as indicated

1. "Walking in the Moonlight" (Roscoe Mitchell Sr.) – 6:55
2. "Dragons" – 6:48
3. "Jeremy" (Jodie Christian) – 1:54
4. "The El" – 2:51
5. "Hey Donald" – 7:45
6. "Keep On Keeping On" (Malachi Favors) – 2:44
7. "The Band Room" – 2:27
8. "Englewood High School" – 4:06
9. "Zero" (Lester Bowie) – 4:29
10. "Song for Rwanda" – 6:23
11. "58th Street" – 4:33
12. "See You at the Fair" – 5:26

== Personnel ==
- Roscoe Mitchell - alto sax, tenor sax, soprano sax, sopranino sax, flute
- Jodie Christian – piano
- Malachi Favors – bass
- Albert "Tootie" Heath – drums, percussion
