= Nonaah =

Studio album by Roscoe Mitchell
- Released: 1977
- Recorded: August 23, 1976, January 15, 17 & 22, & February 22, 1977
- Genre: Jazz
- Label: Nessa
- Producer: Chuck Nessa

Roscoe Mitchell chronology
Roscoe Mitchell Quartet (1976)	Nonaah (1977)	Duets (1977)

Professional ratings
Review scores
Source	Rating
Allmusic	4.5/5 stars
The Rolling Stone Jazz Record Guide	4/5 stars

Nonaah is a double album recorded in 1976–77 by Roscoe Mitchell. It was originally released on the Nessa label in 1977 and features solo, duo, trio and quartet performances by Mitchell, Anthony Braxton, Malachi Favors, Muhal Richard Abrams, George Lewis, Henry Threadgill, Joseph Jarman, and Wallace McMillan. The 2008 double CD reissue added five unreleased saxophone solos to the album.

== Reception ==
The 2008 All About Jazz review by Clifford Allen states “Nonaah is extraordinarily confrontational music--it presents instrument, composer and materials in a profoundly naked light. Perhaps more important than opening up one's preconceptions about the saxophone, it also complicates the AACM aesthetic.” Track 1 - the first version of Nonaah - was recorded in front of an initially hostile audience that had expected a solo concert by Anthony Braxton. Mitchell responds to the jeering and heckling from a section of the audience by forcefully playing an angular 3 second phrase that crosses the entire range of the alto saxophone and repeating that phrase for about 7 minutes and for a further 2 minutes breaks apart the phrase. Having at last silenced the hecklers his improvisation takes a quieter, more sweet toned direction and moves into more conventional free improvisation, ending with audience applause.

== Track listing ==
Original Double LP:

- Side One
1. "Nonaah" - 21:52
- Side Two
1. "Ericka" - 7:57
2. "Nonaah" - 1:15
3. "Off Five Dark Six" - 6:26
4. "A1 Tal 2La" - 8:44
- Side Three
1. "Tahquemnon" - 5:47
2. "Improvisation 1" - 12:53
- Side Four
1. "Ballad" - 4:46
2. "Nonaah" - 17:34

- "Side One and Two tracks 1–2 recorded live on 23 August 1976 in Willisau, Switzerland (solo concert). Side Two track 3 and Side Three track 1 recorded on 17 January 1977 in Chicago, IL. Side Two track 4 and Side Four track 1 recorded on 22 February 1977 in Chicago, IL. Side Three track 2 recorded live on 15 January 1977 at Mapenzi, Berkeley, CA (solo concert). Side Four track 2 recorded on 22 January 1977 in Chicago, IL.

The 2008 CD reissue added the following saxophone solos as bonus tracks:

- "Sing" - 6:15
- "Improvisation 2" - 3:44
- "Sing" - 7:42
- "Chant - 9:14
- "Off Five Dark Six" - 7:23

All compositions by Roscoe Mitchell

== Personnel ==
- Roscoe Mitchell: alto saxophone
- Anthony Braxton: sopranino saxophone (Side Two track 3)
- Malachi Favors: bass (Side Two track 4)
- Muhal Richard Abrams: piano (Side Three track 1)
- George Lewis: trombone (Side Three track 1)
- Henry Threadgill: alto saxophone (Side Four track 2)
- Joseph Jarman: alto saxophone (Side Four track 2)
- Wallace McMillan: alto saxophone (Side Four track 2)
