= Griot Galaxy =

- Origin: Detroit, Michigan, USA
- Genres: Avant Garde Jazz
- Years active: 1972–1989
- Past members: Faruq Z. Bey; Tani Tabbal; Jaribu Shahid; Anthony Holland; David McMurray; Tariq Samad; David Abdul Kahafiz; Patrice Williams ("Kafi Nassoma"), Sadiq Bey, Mubarak Hakim, Spencer Barefield, Horace Harlaque, Darryl Pierce, Elreta Dodds, Eric Anderson

Griot Galaxy was an avant-garde jazz band led by Detroit saxophonist and poet Faruq Z. Bey. The band was founded in 1972 with drummer Tariq Samad, bassist Jaribu Shahid, and saxophonists Bey, Anthony Holland and David McMurray. Their first recorded appearance is often cited as coming from a 1976 album by Phil Ranelin entitled Vibes from the Tribe. Bey is featured with Ranelin on a track called He the One We All Know with drummer Tariq Samad and David Abdul Kahafiz on zeetar. Bey is credited as Faruk Hanif Bey.

The first recording by Griot Galaxy proper was 1981's Kins, released on Black and White Records. In 1983, two tracks appeared on an LP called The Montreux Detroit Collection, vol. 3: Motor City Modernists, recorded at Detroit's Montreux Jazz Festival. A 1983 performance at the Detroit Institute of Arts (DIA) was recorded, but shelved until it was released by Entropy Stereo in 2003.

Throughout 1984, Griot Galaxy toured extensively in Europe. A live recording from Austria was released as Opus Krampus by the German label Sound Aspects. This was the last recording of the group, which officially disbanded in 1989 after Bey was involved in a serious motorcycle accident five years prior.
