= The Day and the Night =

Studio album by Roscoe Mitchell
- Released: 1997
- Recorded: November 11 & 12, 1996
- Studio: Southport Studios, Chicago
- Genre: Jazz
- Length: 52:14
- Label: Dizim
- Producer: Werner Graebner & Werner Boschert

Roscoe Mitchell chronology
Sound Songs (1997)	The Day and the Night (1997)	Nine to Get Ready (1999)

The Day and the Night is an album by American jazz saxophonist Roscoe Mitchell, which was released in 1997 on the German Dizim label.

== Reception ==
The JazzTimes review by Willard Jenkins says "There is a thoughtful, contemplative sense of quietude which marks a good portion of this disc and the dialogue between the trio is palpable."

== Track listing ==
All compositions by Roscoe Mitchell

1. "The Day and the Night" – 8:40
2. "Malachi" – 9:10
3. "Let's Go Out to Sea" – 5:34
4. "Bessie Harris" – 6:18
5. "This" – 5:08
6. "Southside 60" – 6:58
7. "For Lester B." – 5:43
8. "Song for Atala" – 4:49

== Personnel ==
- Roscoe Mitchell - reeds, flutes, percussion
- Malachi Favors – bass
- Gerald Cleaver – drums, percussion
