= Solo 3 =

Solo [3]

Studio album / Live album by Roscoe Mitchell
- Released: 2004
- Recorded: 1999–2003
- Venue: November Music, Essen, Germany and Gent, Belgium
- Studio: Audio for the Arts, Madison, Wisconsin
- Genre: Jazz
- Length: 171:11
- Label: Mutable Music

Roscoe Mitchell chronology
The Bad Guys (2003)	Solo [3] (2004)	First Look, Chicago Duos (2005)

Solo [3] is a solo album by American jazz saxophonist Roscoe Mitchell which was recorded in 2003 and released on Mutable Music as a three CD set.

== Reception ==
Professional ratings
Review scores
Source	Rating
AllMusic	4/5 stars
The Penguin Guide to Jazz Recordings	3/4 stars

In his review for AllMusic, François Couture states " Disc one, titled "Tech Ritter and the Megabytes," is the most varied and interesting of the set. Released by itself, it would have a claim as Mitchell's best solo effort ... This CD offers a compelling balance between composition and improvisation, long and short, abstract and melodic. The second disc, titled "Solar Flares," is entirely devoted to the alto saxophone. Here, Mitchell's improvisations follow a jazzier path. The music is warmer, more reflective, and easier to get into. The disc is dominated by Mitchell's rich sound and acrobatic articulation ... The third disc, titled "The Percussion Cage and Music on the Go," is something else entirely. It contains 21 very short tracks, nothing over five minutes. They are for the most part percussion solos, with a handful of sopranino sax pieces interpolated in the middle. ... The music has its moments, but it pales in comparison to what has been exhibited on the first two disc" In JazzTimes, Chris Kelsey wrote " as much as Mitchell has done to expand the role of percussion in jazz-based improvised music, he is first and foremost a great saxophonist. His innovative sax work almost certainly will be his most important legacy; getting to hear it as plainly as this is without a doubt the best thing about this album".

== Track listing ==
All compositions by Roscoe Mitchell

CD 1: Tech Ritter and the Megabytes

1. "The Little Big Horn 2 (For Bb Bass And Eb Sopranino Saxophones)" – 4:29
2. "November 18, 2000 (For Bb Soprano Saxophone)" – 19:48
3. "1999 / 2002 (For Flute and Percussion Cage)" – 8:46
4. "Tech Ritter and the Megabytes / Improvisation (For Two Altos, Tenor and Bass Saxophones)" – 2:22
5. "November 17, 2000" – 18:33
6. "A Dim Distant World (For Percussion Cage)" – 3:30
7. "Tech Ritter and the Megabytes / Composition (For Alto, Soprano, Tenor and Bass Saxophones)" – 2:15

Track 2 recorded live at November Music 2000 in Essen, Germany, Track 5 recorded live at November Music 2000 in Gent, Belgium and Tracks 1 & 3-7 recorded at Audio for the Arts, Madison, Wisconsin in 2003

CD 2: Solar Flares for Alto Saxophone

1. "Nemus" – 7:00
2. "Beyond Neptune" – 5:10
3. "The Kyper Belt" – 6:51
4. "Miranda" – 7:00
5. "As The Sun Went Down He Would Look Up" – 5:03
6. "Icy Pearls" – 1:18
7. "The Great Red Spot" – 10:29
8. "The Forgotten Players of the Solar System" – 4:41
9. "Methane Snow" – 2:01
10. "Frozen in Time" – 4:47

Recorded at Audio for the Arts, Madison, Wisconsin in 2003

CD 3: The Percussion Cage and Music On the Go

1. "Horn Bell and Drum" – 1:40
2. "Clear Pictures" – 2:38
3. "The Park" – 3:58
4. "The Mercurians" – 2:26
5. "Clocks" – 2:43
6. "A Surface Covered with Cracks" – 4:12
7. "Meteor" – 2:58
8. "Rings" – 1:52
9. "Some Flowers Were Seen" – 2:13
10. "Rock Number 84001" – 2:19
11. "An Ambiguous Sign of Life" – 2:50
12. "On Rolling Hills" – 4:42
13. "Jump" – 1:31
14. "Green Sky" – 0:43
15. "One Two and Red Blew" – 1:25
16. "Truly" – 3:05
17. "It Was Only a Nebula Away" – 5:27
18. "Next Stop Titan" – 2:15
19. "At Corona's End" – 2:18
20. "Dust" – 3:35
21. "Sailing" – 2:53

Recorded at Audio for the Arts, Madison, Wisconsin in 2003

== Personnel ==
- Roscoe Mitchell - sopranino saxophone, soprano saxophone, alto saxophone, tenor saxophone, bass saxophone, percussion cage
