= First Look, Chicago Duos =

Studio album by Roscoe Mitchell
- Released: 2005
- Recorded: December 21 & 22, 2003; February 12, 2004
- Studio: Sparrow Sound Design, Chicago
- Genre: Jazz
- Length: 68:41
- Label: Southport
- Producer: Roscoe Mitchell, Tatsu Aoki

Roscoe Mitchell chronology
| Solo [3] (2004) | First Look, Chicago Duos (2005) | Turn (2005) |

First Look, Chicago Duos is an album by American jazz saxophonist Roscoe Mitchell with Asian American bassist Tatsu Aoki, which was released in 2005 on the Chicago-based Southport label.

== Reception ==
Professional ratings
Review scores
| Source | Rating |
|---|---|
| AllMusic | 4/5 stars |

In his review for AllMusic, Scott Yanow states, "Stimulated by the virtuosic bassist Tatsu Aoki during a series of freely improvised but purposeful duets, Mitchell utilizes circular breathing liberally, sometimes performing a wild string of notes."

The JazzTimes review by Marc Masters says "Both musicians roam comfortably around the tonal spectrum: Mitchell moves from sliding sax and breathy flute to ringing bells and rattling chimes, while Aoki delivers thick plucks, textured bowing and precise percussion."

In a review for All About Jazz, John Kelman notes that "Mitchell and Aoki explore all manner of dynamic range. Yet despite its unequivocal freedom, First Look rarely becomes harsh or jagged."

== Track listing ==
All compositions by Mitchell / Aoki

1. "In" – 8:10
2. "East Side Easy" – 5:54
3. "Number Five Wings Place" – 8:01
4. "The Journey" – 15:11
5. "Glide" – 7:53
6. "Dot" – 8:00
7. "Journey for the Cause" – 4:53
8. "Yoshihashi" – 4:02
9. "Out" – 6:37

== Personnel ==
- Roscoe Mitchell - reeds, flute, percussion
- Tatsu Aoki – bass, percussion
