= Turn (Roscoe Mitchell album) =

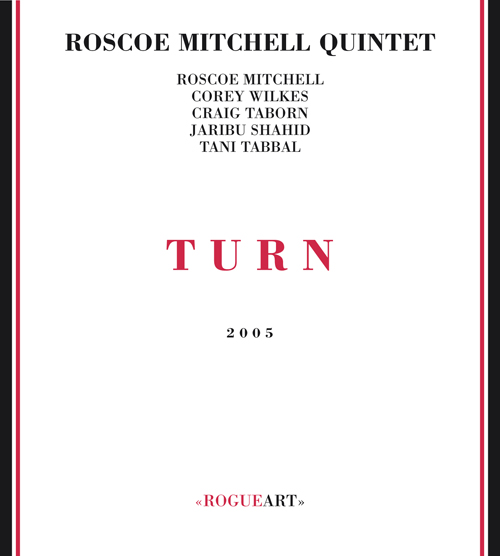

Studio album by Roscoe Mitchell
- Released: 2005
- Recorded: January 4 to 6, 2005
- Studio: Audio for the Arts, Madison, Wisconsin
- Genre: Jazz
- Length: 63:16
- Label: RogueArt
- Producer: Michel Dorbon

Roscoe Mitchell chronology
First Look, Chicago Duos (2005)	Turn (2005)	No Side Effects (2006)

Turn is an album by American jazz saxophonist Roscoe Mitchell which was recorded in 2005 and released on the French RogueArt label. He leads a new quintet with longtime rhythm section Jaribu Shahid on bass and Tani Tabbal on drums, pianist Craig Taborn and new Art Ensemble of Chicago trumpeter Corey Wilkes.

== Reception ==
Professional ratings
Review scores
Source	Rating
AllMusic	4/5 stars

In his review for AllMusic, Alain Drouot states "This is a remarkably focused and concise date featuring Mitchell's brand of atonal jazz mixed with his interests in other musical forms."

The All About Jazz review by Kurt Gottschalk says "As a whole, the group is comfortable together, ready to let the compositions stand and while Shahid and Tabal haven't been the most exciting parts of Mitchell's groups, here they sound better than ever."

== Track listing ==
All compositions by Roscoe Mitchell

1. "Quintet One" – 3:24
2. "For Cynthia" – 5:23
3. "Quintet Nine" – 5:21
4. "For Now" – 3:58
5. "Horner Mac" – 1:34
6. "Rhine Ridge" – 1:24
7. "Page Two A" – 6:19
8. "March 2004" – 3:44
9. "In Six" – 4:44
10. "Turn" – 3:39
11. "Take One" – 8:42
12. "Page One" – 3:47
13. "That's Finished" – 3:58
14. "After" – 7:10

== Personnel ==
- Roscoe Mitchell - soprano sax, alto sax, tenor sax, bass sax, flute, piccolo, percussion
- Corey Wilkes – trumpet, flugelhorn, small percussion
- Craig Taborn – piano
- Jaribu Shahid – bass, electric bass, small percussion
- Tani Tabbal – drums, percussion
