= L-R-G / The Maze / S II Examples =

Studio album by Roscoe Mitchell
- Released: 1978
- Recorded: L-R-G; August 7, 1978; The Maze; July 27, 1978; S II Examples; August 17, 1978
- Studio: L-R-G; Van Gelder Studio, Englewood Cliffs; The Maze; CBS 30th Street Studio, New York City; S II Examples; Streeterville, Chicago
- Genre: Jazz
- Length: 74:53
- Label: Nessa
- Producer: Chuck Nessa

Roscoe Mitchell chronology
Duets (1978)	L-R-G / The Maze / S II Examples (1978)	Sketches from Bamboo (1979)

L-R-G / The Maze / S II Examples is an album by American jazz saxophonist Roscoe Mitchell, recorded in 1978 and released as a double LP on Nessa Records. It was reissued in 1989 as a single CD.

== Background ==
Following a successful three-year stint with the Art Ensemble of Chicago in Europe, in 1971 Mitchell came back to Chicago and moved to a farm in Bath, Michigan, just northeast of Lansing. L-R-G / The Maze / S II Examples brought sound explorations he had made in Michigan together with the earlier innovations made by the Art Ensemble. In 1976 he found a compromise between city and country in Madison, Wisconsin. According to Chuck Nessa, who produced the album, "We spent over a year preparing for that record. I went up to Roscoe's place in Wisconsin every weekend to go over that stuff."

== Composition ==
"L-R-G" (which stands for Leo Smith, Roscoe Mitchell and George Lewis), is a 37-minute trio for sixteen different instruments grouped by type: woodwinds (Mitchell), high brass (Smith) and low brass (Lewis). For this piece and "The Maze," Mitchell uses the term "sound collages". He took inventory of every possible sound the musicians could produce, then organized the sounds into pieces based on texture, without the restriction of fixed tempos. "L-R-G" was performed once more, not long after the album came out, at New York Public Theater.

"The Maze" is a 21-minute octet for all kinds of percussion including a lot of unconventional instruments. Mitchell used on the piece AACM stars as Anthony Braxton and Henry Threadgill to serve as percussionists, together with Art Ensemble members Don Moye, Joseph Jarman, and Malachi Favors. Chuck Nessa remembers that it took the musicians more than four hours just to set up all those instruments, but that they nailed the piece in one live take. "The Maze" would never be performed again until two decades later, when Mitchell played all three pieces from the album at the Museum of Contemporary Art, Chicago.

"S II Examples" is a 17-minute exploration of multi-phonics on the curved soprano saxophone. The piece was originally designed to be played by a trio with Jarman and Braxton, but when they got together Mitchell discovered that one example that could be done in his curved soprano saxophone couldn't be played on their straight sopranos, so he decided to record it as a solo piece.

== Reception ==
Professional ratings
Review scores
Source	Rating
AllMusic	4.5/5 stars
The Penguin Guide to Jazz	3/4 stars
The Rolling Stone Jazz Record Guide	4/5 stars

In his review for AllMusic, Dave Lewis called the album "a splendidly recorded and mastered CD, and inasmuch as Roscoe Mitchell as classical composer is concerned, this is very close to where it truly starts." The Penguin Guide to Jazz says that "it's a rather bewitching set altogether, and a useful notebook on what Chicago's playing élite were looking into at the period."

== Track listing ==
All compositions by Roscoe Mitchell

1. "L-R-G" - 36:37
2. "The Maze" - 20:45
3. "S II Examples" - 17:31

== Personnel ==
L-R-G

- Roscoe Mitchell - piccolo, flute, oboe, clarinet, soprano sax, alto sax, tenor sax, baritone sax, bass saxophone
- Wadada Leo Smith - trumpet, pocket trumpet, flugelhorn
- George Lewis - sousaphone, Wagner tuba, alto trombone, tenor trombone

The Maze

- Thurman Barker - drums, cow bells, conga drum, gong, glockenspiel, hand bells, marimba, slap stick, triangle, whistle
- Malachi Favors - log drum, gong, balafon, cans, hand bells, shakers, seal horn, tambourine, temple gong, zither
- Roscoe Mitchell - bugle glockenspiel, bicycle horns, balafon, cow bells, cymbals, conga drum, cycle sprocket, dinner chimes, dome bells, frying pans, finger cymbals, gongs, hanging bell, large swinging bell, press horn, Swiss cow bells, swinging bells, swinging Swiss cow bells, thunder sheet, tuned cymbals, temple blocks, triangles, wood blocks, wood desk, zizzle cymbals
- Henry Threadgill - cymbal gongs, finger cymbals, gong, garbage can bottoms, hubkaphone, hand bells, plumbing brass, rhythm sticks, hackbrett
- Joseph Jarman - A bell, balafon, bike horns, cymbals, Chinese cymbals, conga drums, chimes, cymbal rack, conch shell, drums, gongs, hand bells, marimba, tom tom, vibraphone, temple gongs
- Anthony Braxton - bass drum, cymbals, glockenspiel, garbage can machine, marimba can machine, marimba, orchestra bells, sloshing can machine, snare drum, wash tub machine, xylophone
- Douglas Ewart - bamboo table, cymbals, cow bells, large chimes, small chimes, door bell, gongs, hanging bells, little bells, marimba, metal xylophone, winding bell, wooden cow bell, zizzle cymbal
- Don Moye - drums, balafon, cow bells, conga drums, cymbal rack, gongs, hand bells, little horns, marimba, triangle, temple gongs, wood blocks

S II Examples

- Roscoe Mitchell - soprano saxophone
