= Far Side (album) =

Live album by Roscoe Mitchell and the Note Factory
- Released: 2010
- Recorded: March 17, 2007
- Venue: Stadtsaal; Burghausen, Germany
- Genre: Jazz
- Length: 65:53
- Label: ECM; ECM 2087
- Producer: Steve Lake

Roscoe Mitchell chronology
Spectrum (2007)	Far Side (2010)	Numbers (2011)

Far Side is a live album by jazz saxophonist and composer Roscoe Mitchell and the Note Factory recorded at the Stadtsaal in Burghausen, Germany on March 17, 2007, and released on ECM in 2010.

== Reception ==
Professional ratings
Review scores
Source	Rating
AllMusic	4/5 stars
DownBeat	4/5 stars
All About Jazz	4/5 stars
PopMatters	7/10 stars
The Guardian	3/5 stars
Financial Times	3/5 stars

The AllMusic review by Matt Collar awarded the album 4 stars stating "If you're a hardcore Mitchell aficionado and/or fan of ECM's cerebral jazz catalog, Far Side would be a stellar addition to your library."

In a review for DownBeat, Alain Drouot stated that Mitchell's "ability to create a maelstrom powered by his dazzling circular breathing technique, his keen interest in textures or his use of extremely sparse notes are all highlighted and, as a result, Far Side is a fine addition to his ... discography."

All About Jazz reviewer John Kelman described Far Side as "an album that, while not for the faint-at-heart, delivers reward after reward to the intrepid ear, so thorough and so compelling, that it's impossible to truly capture what's happening on the first, second, or even tenth listen."

John Garratt, writing for PopMatters, remarked: "the granddaddy of the Chicago avant-garde is still exploring the abstract nature of sound with acoustic instruments. Although Mitchell has recorded under the Note Factory name before, Far Side is a far less jazzy affair than its predecessors... For those faithful to the Art Ensemble of Chicago and beyond, Roscoe Mitchell's experimental sound will still be a welcome challenge."

In an article for Jazz Times, Britt Robson stated: "Looking over the nearly half-century that Roscoe Mitchell has been expanding the envelope of avant-garde jazz, it is remarkable how consistent his principles and sound have remained... Let's get this man more opportunities to play when the tapes are rolling. What's beyond the Far Side?"

The Guardian's John Fordham wrote: "this subtly assembled show gets a lot out of its participants – and mixes the anticipated maelstroms of collective tussling with passages of a kind of rough-surfaced tranquillity, eloquent layering of the qualities of reeds, brass, deep strings and percussion, and some scaldingly imaginative flights from its premier-league pianists."

Mike Hobart of the Financial Times commented: "The somewhat bleak hovering dissonance, off-kilter rhythms and swirling ensembles are remarkably contained for a live performance... Craig Taborn’s space-aware piano stands out, Corey Wilkes adds soulful trumpet spike and pianist VJ Iyer warms up the final track, though its the leader’s sustained burst of circular-breathed saxophone that lingers most."

== Track listing ==
All compositions by Roscoe Mitchell

1. "Far Side/Cards/Far Side" – 30:56
2. "Quintet 2007 A for Eight" – 9:56
3. "Trio Four for Eight" – 12:37
4. "Ex Flover Five" – 12:24

== Personnel ==
- Roscoe Mitchell – soprano saxophone, alto saxophone, tenor saxophone, flute
- Corey Wilkes – trumpet, flugelhorn
- Vijay Iyer, Craig Taborn – piano
- Jaribu Shahid – bass
- Harrison Bankhead – cello, bass
- Vincent Davis, Tani Tabbal – drums
