= Live at the Knitting Factory (Roscoe Mitchell album) =

Live album by Roscoe Mitchell and the Sound Ensemble
- Released: 1987
- Recorded: November 11, 1987
- Genre: Jazz
- Length: 60:47
- Label: Black Saint
- Producer: Giovanni Bonandrini

Roscoe Mitchell chronology
The Flow of Things (1986)	Live at the Knitting Factory (1987)	Live in Detroit (1988)

Live at the Knitting Factory is a live album by jazz saxophonist Roscoe Mitchell and the Sound Ensemble recorded in 1987 at the Knitting Factory for the Italian Black Saint label.

== Reception ==
The Allmusic review by Brian Olewnick awarded the album 3 stars stating "This live set with his Sound Ensemble features several compositions and approaches that Roscoe Mitchell explored with some regularity in the late '80s... it's a pleasure to hear Mitchell's imaginative and forceful alto playing (as well as some fine work by trumpeter Ragin), but there is little sense of the group dynamics that were paramount on records like Snurdy McGurdy and Her Dancin' Shoes... Humdrum Mitchell is still more exciting than a lot of the better offerings from his peers though, so fans of his will still want to hear this album. It's just a little disappointing after fine efforts".

Professional ratings
Review scores
Source	Rating
Allmusic	3/5 stars
The Penguin Guide to Jazz Recordings	3/4 stars

== Track listing ==
All compositions by Roscoe Mitchell

1. "Almost Like Raindrops" - 8:57
2. "Bass Solo From the Composition Sing" - 2:23
3. "Nonaah" - 10:20
4. "The Flight of Birds" - 1:09
5. "Trumpet Solo From the Composition Rock Out" - 2:01
6. "The Reverend Frank Wright" - 13:00
7. "You Changed the Texture on Me" - 11:16
8. "Beyond the Fast Lane" - 1:56
9. "The Stick & Stone" - 9:45

- Recorded at the Knitting Factory in New York City on November 11, 1987

== Personnel ==
- Roscoe Mitchell - soprano saxophone, alto saxophone
- Hugh Ragin - trumpet, flugelhorn
- A. Spencer Barefield - guitar, piano
- Jaribu Shahid - bass, congas
- Tani Tabbal - percussion
