= Roscoe Mitchell and the Sound and Space Ensembles =

Studio album by Roscoe Mitchell
- Released: 1983
- Recorded: June 2 & 3, 1983
- Genre: Jazz
- Length: 42:25
- Label: Black Saint
- Producer: Giovanni Bonandrini

Roscoe Mitchell chronology
3 x 4 Eye (1981)	Roscoe Mitchell and the Sound and Space Ensembles (1983)	An Interesting Breakfast Conversation (1984)

Roscoe Mitchell and the Sound and Space Ensembles is an album by jazz saxophonist Roscoe Mitchell recorded in 1983 for the Italian Black Saint label.

== Reception ==
The Allmusic review by Brian Olewnick awarded the album 3 1/2 stars stating "For serious Mitchell fans, this is worth having for the highlights; newcomers might find an easier "in" with the slightly earlier and utterly wonderful Snurdy McGurdy and Her Dancin' Shoes on Nessa".

Professional ratings
Review scores
Source	Rating
Allmusic	3.5/5 stars
The Penguin Guide to Jazz Recordings	4/4 stars

== Track listing ==
All compositions by Roscoe Mitchell

1. "Words" – 11:18
2. 'You Wastin' My Tyme" – 4:06
3. "Views A, B, C" – 4:32
4. "Line Fine Lyon Seven" – 8:03
5. "View D" – 2:13
6. "Variations on Sketches from Bamboo" – 12:13

- Recorded at Barigozzi Studio in Milano, Italy on June 2 & 3, 1983

== Personnel ==
- Roscoe Mitchell – soprano saxophone, alto saxophone, tenor saxophone, bass saxophone, vocals
- Michael Mossman – trumpet, flugelhorn, piccolo trumpet, percussion (tracks 2–6)
- Gerald Oshita – tenor saxophone, baritone saxophone contrabass sarrusophone, mezzo-soprano Conn-o-saxophone (tracks 1, 2, 4 & 6)
- Spencer Barefield – guitar, percussion, vocals (tracks 2–6)
- Jaribu Shahid – bass, electric bass, percussion, vocals (tracks 2–6)
- Tani Tabbal – drums, bongos, vocals (tracks 2–6)
- Tom Buckner – voice (tracks 1 & 6)
