= The Bad Guys (album) =

Live album by Roscoe Mitchell
- Released: 2003
- Recorded: July 8, 2000
- Venue: Fano
- Genre: Jazz
- Length: 62:09
- Label: Around Jazz / Il Manifesto

Roscoe Mitchell chronology
Song for My Sister (2002)	The Bad Guys (2003)	Solo [3] (2004)

The Bad Guys is an album by American jazz saxophonist Roscoe Mitchell and The Note Factory, which was recorded live in 2000 at the Jazz by the Sea Festival in Fano. It was released by the Around Jazz label in 2003.

== Track listing ==
All compositions by Roscoe Mitchell except as indicated

1. "Choro Por Merilina" (Stephen Rush) – 7:36
2. "Down in the Basement" – 13:35
3. "Oh, See How They Run to L.A." – 9:17
4. "Do That Dance Called the Tangler" – 15:36
5. "The Bad Guys" (Stephen Rush) – 11:10
6. "That Would Be Fine" – 4:55

== Personnel ==
- Roscoe Mitchell - saxophones
- Wadada Leo Smith - trumpet
- Matthew Shipp, Craig Taborn - piano
- Spencer Barefield - guitar
- Jaribu Shahid, Harrison Bankhead - bass
- Tani Tabbal, Gerald Cleaver - drums
