= No Side Effects =

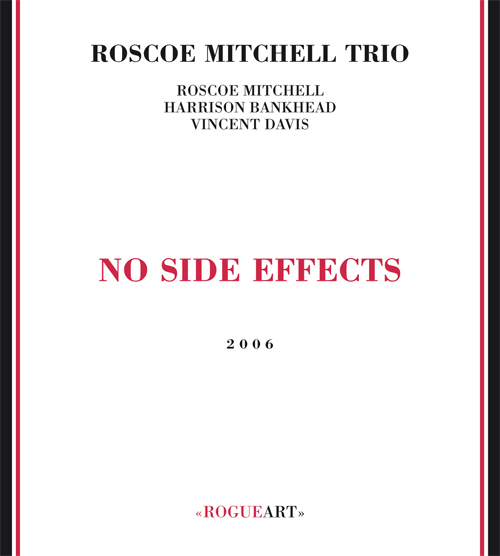

Studio album by Roscoe Mitchell
- Released: 2006
- Recorded: December 23 & 24, 2005; January 10 & February 18, 2006
- Studio: Audio for the Arts, Madison, Wisconsin
- Genre: Jazz
- Length: 126:04
- Label: RogueArt
- Producer: Michel Dorbon

Roscoe Mitchell chronology
| Turn (2005) | No Side Effects (2006) | Composition/Improvisation Nos. 1, 2 & 3 (2007) |

No Side Effects is a double album by American jazz saxophonist Roscoe Mitchell which was released in 2006 on the French RogueArt label. He leads a trio with Harrison Bankead on bass and cello and Vincent Davis on drums.

== Reception ==
Professional ratings
Review scores
| Source | Rating |
|---|---|
| AllMusic | 4.5/5 stars |

In his review for AllMusic, Alain Drouot states "Mitchell achieves a fine equilibrium between introspection, angularity, and intensity... The performance has a timeless quality since Mitchell only tries to fulfill his artistic mission, makes no concession to trends, and refuses to compromise with his ideas."

The All About Jazz review by Marc Medwin says "Mitchell's recordings can elicit a deeply intuitive but ultimately inexplicable sense of unification in the face of superficial diversity, and this newest double disc is no exception."

== Track listing ==
All compositions by Roscoe Mitchell

Disc One: No Side Effects

1. "Poem" - 6:23
2. "Flash" - 5:24
3. "From Red to Rusk" - 4:48
4. "Broken Pictures" - 4:23
5. "Shake-up" - 8:10
6. "Trio Four" - 4:36
7. "No Side Effects" - 3:12
8. "Frame Three" - 6:30
9. "Shag Bark Hickory" - 2:25
10. "Let's See" - 3:57
11. "Ruddy" - 4:20
12. "Vermillon" - 4:12
13. "When the Winds Blow" - 6:11

Disc Two: Frames

1. "Parched Plain" - 13:38
2. "Shore Line" - 5:22
3. "An Afternoon Walk" - 6:02
4. "Enfold" - 6:56
5. "Frame Two" - 2:51
6. "They Danced" - 3:35
7. "Ride" - 3:41
8. "Here We Go" - 3:39
9. "Rolling" - 6:15
10. "Yellow Night" - 6:41
11. "Sway" - 2:53

== Personnel ==
- Roscoe Mitchell - soprano sax, alto sax, tenor sax, bass sax, flute, piccolo, percussion
- Harrison Bankhead – bass, cello
- Vincent Davis – drums, percussion
