= Nine to Get Ready =

Studio album by Roscoe Mitchell
- Released: 1999
- Recorded: May 1997
- Studio: Avatar (New York, New York)
- Genre: Jazz
- Length: 65:22
- Label: ECM; ECM 1651
- Producer: Manfred Eicher

Roscoe Mitchell chronology
The Day and the Night (1997)	Nine to Get Ready (1999)	In Walked Buckner (1998)

Nine to Get Ready is an album by jazz saxophonist and composer Roscoe Mitchell recorded in May 1997 and released on ECM in 1999. The nonet features brass section Hugh Ragin and George Lewis, and double-rhythm section Matthew Shipp and Craig Taborn, Jaribu Shahid and William Parker, and Tani Tabbal and Gerald Cleaver.

== Reception ==
The AllMusic review by Scott Yanow stated: "The performances are mostly concise, emphasize ensembles (it is difficult to believe that the two rhythm sections are playing simultaneously) and are sometimes surprisingly mellow although there are intense moments. None of the original pieces are that memorable but the overall mood is haunting and at times jubilant. An intriguing addition to Roscoe Mitchell's discography."

Professional ratings
Review scores
Source	Rating
AllMusic	3/5 stars
The Penguin Guide to Jazz Recordings	3/4 stars

== Track listing ==
All compositions by Roscoe Mitchell

1. "Leola" – 9:35
2. "Dream and Response" – 5:04
3. "For Lester B" – 6:08
4. "Jamaican Farewell" – 5:43
5. "Hop Hip Bip Bir Rip" – 6:02
6. "Nine to Get Ready" – 3:53
7. "Bessie Harris" – 6:44
8. "Fallen Heroes" – 6:37
9. "Move Toward the Light" – 3:21
10. "Big Red Peaches" – 2:05

== Personnel ==
- Roscoe Mitchell – soprano, alto, and tenor saxophones, flute, vocals
- Hugh Ragin – trumpet
- George Lewis – trombone
- Matthew Shipp – piano
- Craig Taborn – piano
- Jaribu Shahid – bass, vocals
- William Parker – bass
- Tani Tabbal – drums, jimbe, vocal
- Gerald Cleaver – drums
