= Spectrum (Muhal Richard Abrams and Roscoe Mitchell album) =

Live album by Muhal Richard Abrams and Roscoe Mitchell
- Released: 2009
- Venues: Philharmonic Hall, Ostrava, Czech Republic
- Genre: Free jazz
- Labels: Mutable Music; 17536-2

Spectrum is a live album by pianist and composer Muhal Richard Abrams and saxophonist and composer Roscoe Mitchell. It was recorded at Philharmonic Hall in Ostrava, Czech Republic, and was released by Mutable Music in 2009. The album begins with an improvised duet by Abrams and Mitchell titled "Romu." This is followed by Mitchell's three-part "Non-Cognitive Aspects of the City" for baritone and orchestra, commissioned by Mutable Music, with a text by Joseph Jarman, and featuring singer Thomas Buckner with the Janáček Philharmonic Orchestra. The album concludes with the Janáček Philharmonic's performance of Abrams's "Mergertone" for orchestra, commissioned by the Ostrava Center for New Music and premiered at the opening concert of the Ostrava Days 2007 festival. Both orchestral works were conducted by Petr Kotik.

== Reception ==
Professional ratings
Review scores
Source	Rating
AllMusic	4.5/5 stars

In a review for AllMusic, Dave Lewis wrote: "Spectrum demonstrates how Abrams and Mitchell can both be well inside the established norms of composition and improvisation and still tread somewhere off the path; it likewise demonstrates the vital contributions these masters continue to make in the realm of American music."

Kurt Gottschalk, writing for All About Jazz, called "Romu" "just plain lovely, a beautiful, unhurried interaction building slowly to a relative frenzy but never losing its center," and noted that the orchestral compositions show "an interest... in mixing mid-20th Century orchestral vocabulary with romantic flourish."

In an article for Point of Departure, Art Lange stated that the opening duet offers "an improvisation of rhapsodic mood and slowly expanding dimensions – Abrams' piano a constellation of illuminating details, and Mitchell's alto saxophone, like Robert Browning's depiction of heaven, reaching for the unknown just beyond his grasp." Regarding the two orchestral works, Lange commented: "The compositional choices they have made reflect separate solutions to the sound potential of the orchestral medium itself, each utilizing the full breadth of post-Schönberg harmonic procedures; an individual, intuitive sense of dramatic expression; and the expanded palette of colors and corresponding intensities available to them."

== Track listing ==
1. "Romu" (Abrams/Mitchell) – 11:51
2. "Non-Cognitive Aspects of the City I" (Mitchell, text by Joseph Jarman) – 6:33
3. "Non-Cognitive Aspects of the City II" (Mitchell, text by Joseph Jarman) – 2:03
4. "Non-Cognitive Aspects of the City III" (Mitchell, text by Joseph Jarman) – 8:21
5. "Mergertone" (Abrams) – 17:15

== Personnel ==
- Muhal Richard Abrams – piano (track 1), composer (track 5)
- Roscoe Mitchell – alto saxophone (track 1), composer (tracks 2–4)
- Thomas Buckner – baritone (tracks 2–4)
- Petr Kotik – conductor (tracks 2–5)
- Janáček Philharmonic Orchestra (tracks 2–5)
