= The Flow of Things =

Live album by Roscoe Mitchell
- Released: 1986
- Recorded: June 29 & September 7, 1986
- Genre: Jazz
- Length: 43:12
- Label: Black Saint
- Producer: Giovanni Bonandrini

Roscoe Mitchell chronology
Roscoe Mitchell Solo - Live at the Muhle Hunziken (1986)	The Flow of Things (1986)	Live at the Knitting Factory (1987)

The Flow of Things is a live album by jazz saxophonist Roscoe Mitchell recorded in 1986 for the Italian Black Saint label.

== Reception ==
The Allmusic review by Stephen Cook awarded the album 3 stars stating "The Flow of Things is probably not the best entrée into Mitchell's work, but after a few Art Ensemble of Chicago records and one of his earlier efforts, make sure to come back for a listen".

Professional ratings
Review scores
Source	Rating
Allmusic	3/5 stars
The Penguin Guide to Jazz Recordings	2/4 stars

== Track listing ==
All compositions by Roscoe Mitchell

1. "The Flow of Things No. 1" – 10:29
2. "The Flow of Things No. 2" – 10:11
3. "Cards for Quartet" – 9:14
4. "The Flow of Things No. 3" – 13:18

- Recorded at the Goetz Theater in Chicago, Illinois on June 29, 1986 (tracks 3 & 4) and the Raccoon Club in Chicago, Illinois on September 7, 1986 (tracks 1 & 2)

== Personnel ==
- Roscoe Mitchell – soprano saxophone, alto saxophone
- Jodie Christian – piano
- Malachi Favors – bass
- Steve McCall – drums
