= Ushio Torikai =

Japanese composer

Ushio Torikai (鳥養潮; surname Torikai; born July 11, 1952, in Matsumoto, Nagano Prefecture, Japan) is a Japanese composer of contemporary classical music. She is known for her highly individual musical voice, developed over many years of research and compositional experience in diverse musical fields including European classical music, traditional Japanese music, ancient Japanese music and computer/electronics.

== Early life ==
Torikai was raised in Matsumoto, Nagano, where she attended Matsumoto Fukashi High School. She then moved to Tokyo and graduated from the faculty of Economics at Keio University.

== Career ==
She started a concert series of her own music in 1979, and was invited to the Paris Biennale in 1982. Concerts of her music have since been presented in major cities in Europe, North America and Japan, including at the Georges Pompidou Center (Paris), the Cathedral of St. John the Divine (New York), the Museum of Modern Art (San Francisco), and Meiji Shrine (Tokyo).

Torikai's compositions vary considerably in instrumentation, ranging from Western orchestral instruments to traditional Japanese ones, computer/electronics to reconstructed ancient Asian instruments, and Western Choir to Japanese Buddhist monks’ chants.

She has received commissions from the City of Los Angeles, Ensemble Modern (Frankfurt), the Kronos Quartet, the Ensemble Continuum (New York), the Canadian Electronic Ensemble, the Japan Broadcasting Corporation, Tokyo Ministry of Culture, and Japan National Theater, to name only a few. Commissioned pieces range from works for concert music and opera to a permanent music installation in a public park.

Her career is characterized by a variety of multidisciplinary collaborations. She has a long history of involvement as a composer in theater (with such as Lee Breuer and Mabou Mines), in dance and in multi-media projects.

Torikai's albums have been released on JVC: GO WHERE?, with compositions realized at IRCAM (the computer-oriented musical research center in Paris); A UN, a seventy-five-minute work for a choir of forty Japanese Buddhist Monks; Son Bou no Toki, featuring a Native American's poem; and Many Winters, dedicated to the victims of 9/11. Her newest album REST (chamber works for strings, piano and voices), dedicated to the victims of war and terrorism in the world, was released on Innova Records.

== Influence ==
In the early 1980s, Torikai devoted significant effort to introducing shomyo (Japanese Buddhist monks' chants) and ancient Japanese music and instruments to the Japanese contemporary music scene and audience. For example, she was responsible for the reconstruction and reintroduction of the kugo, an ancient Asian angular harp whose origins can be traced back more than three millennia and which had been unused for over 1200 years. The mission to bring it back to life led to her philosophy of “positivity” - the fundamental human desire to follow our incredible imagination - and that individuals possess their own kind of “music” and beauty unique to themselves.

The New York Times has written: “Ms. Torikai has a wide ranging musical imagination….[Her] music was spectacular, exuberant, radical and dense.”
