= 3 x 4 Eye =

Studio album by Roscoe Mitchell
- Released: 1981
- Recorded: February 18 & 19, 1981
- Genre: Jazz
- Length: 41:06
- Label: Black Saint
- Producer: Giovanni Bonandrini

Roscoe Mitchell chronology
Snurdy McGurdy and Her Dancin' Shoes (1980)	3 x 4 Eye (1981)	Roscoe Mitchell and the Sound and Space Ensembles (1983)

3 x 4 Eye is an album by jazz saxophonist Roscoe Mitchell and the Sound Ensemble, recorded in 1981 for the Italian Black Saint label.

== Reception ==
The AllMusic review by Ron Wynn stated: "This isn't among his most intense or combative dates, but Mitchell and the Sound Ensemble are still well worth hearing".

Professional ratings
Review scores
Source	Rating
AllMusic	3.5/5 stars
The Penguin Guide to Jazz Recordings	3/4 stars
The Rolling Stone Jazz Record Guide	4/5 stars

== Track listing ==
All compositions by Roscoe Mitchell

1. "Cut Outs for Quintet" – 17:24
2. "Jo Jar" – 4:44
3. "3 x 4 Eye" – 12:11
4. "Variations on a Folk Song Written in the Sixties" – 6:47
  - Recorded at Barigozzi Studio in Milano, Italy on February 18 & 19, 1981

== Personnel ==
- Roscoe Mitchell – soprano saxophone, alto saxophone
- Hugh Ragin – piccolo trumpet, trumpet, flugelhorn
- A. Spencer Barefiled – guitar
- Jaribu Shahid – bass, congas
- Tani Tabbal – percussion
