= Gerald Oshita =

American musician, composer and sound recordist

Gerald Oshita (1942–1992) was an American musician, composer, and sound recordist.

Oshita, who was of Japanese ancestry, lived in the San Francisco Bay Area and specialized in unusual wind instruments, particularly those of especially low register. He performed and recorded with straight alto saxophone, tenor and baritone saxophones, contrabass sarrusophone, and Conn-o-sax, and also made shakuhachi (Japanese bamboo flutes).

Oshita's music drew on elements of jazz as well as contemporary classical music, and was often partly or wholly improvised. Among the musicians with whom Oshita frequently worked were Roscoe Mitchell and Thomas Buckner, and this trio released two recordings on the 1750 Arch Records label. His work shows the influence of Asian music and philosophy, and he is considered one of the seminal musicians in the development of Asian American jazz.

In 1994, the Gerald Oshita Memorial Fellowship was established in Oshita's memory by an anonymous donor. The fellowship is presented annually to a composer of Asian, African, Latino, or Native American heritage, and supports a residency at the Djerassi Resident Artists Program on the Program's ranch in Woodside, California.

== Discography ==
=== Space ===
with Roscoe Mitchell and Tom Buckner (1750 Arch Records, 1984)

Jam Rice Sextet - Jam Rice Relaxin’ (Frasco, 1976)

Compilation - New Music For Woodwinds And Voice / An Interesting Breakfast Conversation (Mutable Music, 2000)

=== As sideman ===
With Roscoe Mitchell

- Roscoe Mitchell and the Sound and Space Ensembles (Black Saint, 1983)

With Yosuke Yamashita Trio

- Yosuke Yamashita Trio, Gerald Oshita - Arashi (Frasco, 1977 – FS-7019.20)

== See also ==
- Asian American jazz
