= Budding of a Rose =

Studio album by Wadada Leo Smith
- Released: 1979
- Recorded: June 1979
- Studio: Palm Studio, Paris.
- Genre: Jazz
- Label: Moers Music momu 02026
- Producer: Burkhard Hennen

Wadada Leo Smith chronology
Divine Love (1979)	Budding of a Rose (1979)	Spirit Catcher (1979)

Professional ratings
Review scores
Source	Rating
AllMusic	4/5 stars
The Encyclopedia of Popular Music	3/5 stars

Budding of a Rose is a studio album by American jazz trumpeter Wadada Leo Smith with a large ensemble. The album was recorded in Paris, following a radio performance the day before, and released in 1979 via German Moers Music label.

== Background ==
Smith explains that "Budding of a Rose" refers to an idea about mysticism or enlightenment, for the rose is one of the symbols of the Rosicrucians. The song "Harmonium" talks about the balance of the Universe. In "Mutumishi" Smith explored how instruments of different pitches could play the same lines.

== Track listing ==
All tracks are written by Wadada Leo Smith.

No.	Title	Length
1.	"Harmonium"	17:04
2.	"Mutumishi"	5:35
3.	"Budding of a Rose"	21:17

== Partial list of personnel ==
Band

- Leo Smith – trumpet
- Roscoe Mitchell – alto saxophone
- Wes Brown – bass
- Pheeroan AkLaff – drums, percussion
- Marilyn Crispell – piano
- Bobby Naughton – vibraphone
- Pinguin Moschner – tuba

Production

- Jürgen Pankarz – artwork
- Alex Dutilh – photography
- Burkhard Hennen – producer
- Jef Gilson – recording
