= Hugh Ragin =

American jazz trumpeter

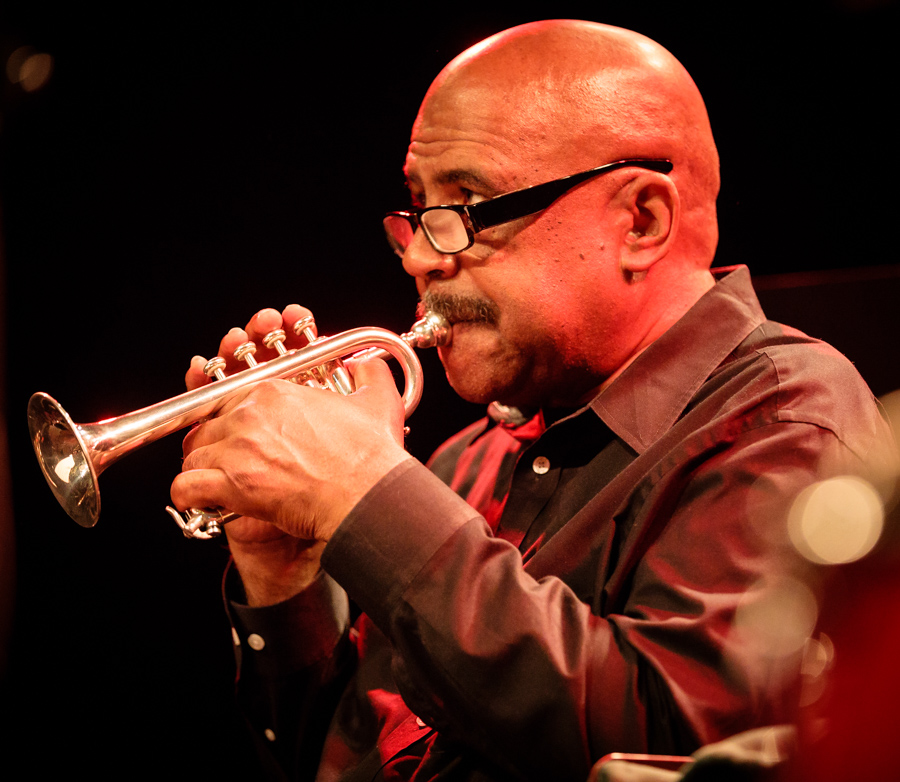
- Hugh Ragin at the 2017 Kongsberg Jazzfestival

Background information
- Born: Houston, Texas, United States
- Genres: Jazz, avant-garde jazz
- Occupation: Musician
- Instrument: Trumpet
- Years active: 1980s–present
- Label: Justin Time

Hugh Ragin is an American jazz trumpeter.

== Career ==
Ragin was born and raised in Houston, Texas, and began playing trumpet in his early teens, taking lessons in classical music, and was a member of the Houston All-City High School Orchestra. He received a degree in music education from the University of Houston and a degree in classical trumpet performance from Colorado State University. He continued his education in 1978 at the Creative Music Studio with Roscoe Mitchell. One year later he performed with Mitchell, Wadada Leo Smith, and the Creative Orchestra at the Moers Festival in Germany. He then toured with Anthony Braxton. During the early 1980s he toured with jazz trumpeter Maynard Ferguson. He began an association with David Murray, becoming a member of Murray's band in the 1980s.

== Discography ==
=== As leader or co-leader ===
- Team Work (Cecma, 1982) with John Lindberg
- Metaphysical Question (Cecma, 1985)
- An Afternoon in Harlem (Justin Time, 1999)
- Gallery (CIMP, 1999)
- Back to Saturn (Black Saint, 2000)
- Fanfare & Fiesta (Justin Time, 2001)
- Feel the Sunshine (Justin Time, 2002)
- Sound Pictures for Solo Trumpet (Hopscotch, 2002)
- Revelation (Justin Time, 2004)

=== As sideman ===
With Anthony Braxton

- Composition 98 (hat ART, 1981)

With John Lindberg

- Dimension 5 (Black Saint, 1981)
- Haunt of the Unresolved (Nato, 1983)
- Trilogy of Works for Eleven Instrumentalists (Black Saint, 1985)

With A. Spencer Barefield

- After The End (Sound Aspects, 1989)

With Roscoe Mitchell

- Sketches from Bamboo (Moers Music, 1979)
- More Cutouts (Cecma, 1981)
- Snurdy McGurdy and Her Dancin' Shoes (Nessa, 1981)
- 3 x 4 Eye (Black Saint, 1981)
- Live at the Knitting Factory (Black Saint, 1987)
- Live in Detroit (Cecma, 1989)
- Nine to Get Ready (ECM, 1997)
- Duets with Tyshawn Sorey and Special Guest Hugh Ragin (Wide Hive, 2013)
- Bells for the South Side (ECM, 2017)

With The Art Ensemble of Chicago

- We Are On The Edge: A 50th Anniversary Celebration (Pi Recordings, 2019)
- The Sixth Decade - From Paris to Paris: Live at Sons D'Hiver (Rouge Art, 2023)

With David Murray

- New Life (Black Saint, 1985)
- Hope Scope (Black Saint, 1987)
- Remembrances (DIW, 1990)
- David Murray Big Band (DIW/Columbia, 1991)
- South of the Border (DIW, 1992)
- Picasso (DIW, 1993)
- Dark Star: The Music of the Grateful Dead (Astor Place, 1996)
- Fo Deuk Revue (Justin Time, 1996)
- Speaking in Tongues (Justin Time, 1997)
- Octet Plays Trane (Justin Time 1999)
- Yonn-Dé (Justin Time, 2001)
- Now Is Another Time (Justin Time, 2003)

With RACCA trio (Alex Nauman, Matt Smiley, Ron Coulter)

- The Great Expanse (Right Brain Records, 2022)
- Four Phase (Kreating SounD, June 2022)

With SeFa LoCo (Bret Sexton, Farrell Lowe, Matt Smiley, Ron Coulter)

- Futurist Song Forms, vol. 2 (Kreating SounD, December 2022)
- Entanglements (Right Brain Records, 2022)
- occurrency (Right Brain Records, 2022)

With Fred Wesley

- Comme ci comme ça (1991)
- Swing and be funky (1993)
