= Snurdy McGurdy and Her Dancin' Shoes =

Studio album by Roscoe Mitchell
- Released: 1981
- Recorded: December 11 & 12, 1980
- Studio: Curtom Recording Studio, Chicago
- Genre: Jazz
- Length: 40:29
- Label: Nessa
- Producer: Chuck Nessa

Roscoe Mitchell chronology
Sketches from Bamboo (1979)	Snurdy McGurdy and Her Dancin' Shoes (1981)	3 x 4 Eye (1981)

Snurdy McGurdy and Her Dancin' Shoes is an album by American jazz saxophonist Roscoe Mitchell which was recorded in 1980 and released on Nessa. It was the debut of the Sound Ensemble which introduced four young musicians: trumpeter Hugh Ragin, guitarist A. Spencer Barefield, bassist Jaribu Shahid and drummer Tani Tabbal. The album was reissued on CD in 2003.

== Reception ==
Professional ratings
Review scores
Source	Rating
AllMusic	4.5/5 stars
The Rolling Stone Jazz Record Guide	4/5 stars

In his review for AllMusic, Brian Olewnick states that the album "belongs in the collection of any serious fan of late-20th century jazz" and claims that it's "surely Mitchell's most brilliant since his late-'60s masterpieces like Congliptious and Old/Quartet."

== Track listing ==
All compositions by Roscoe Mitchell except as indicated

1. "Sing/Song" – 7:48
2. "CYP" – 7:12
3. "Stomp and the Far East Blues" – 5:15
4. "March (Composition 40 Q)" (Anthony Braxton) – 4:41
5. "Round" – 10:12
6. "Snurdy McGurdy and Her Dancin' Shoes" – 5:21

== Personnel ==
- Roscoe Mitchell - soprano sax, alto sax, tenor sax, bass sax, clarinet, flute, wood flute
- Hugh Ragin – trumpet, flugelhorn, piccolo trumpet
- A. Spencer Barefield – guitar, 12 string guitar, electric guitar, piano
- Jaribu Shahid – bass, electric bass, cello, percussion
- Tani Tabbal – drums, percussion
