= Moers Music =

German jazz record label

Moers Music is a German jazz record label that was founded by Burkhard Hennen in Moers, Germany. The label started in 1974 under the name Ring but was changed three years later due to a conflict with a Canadian record label that had the same name. Moers concentrates on free jazz and has released albums by Barry Altschul, Anthony Braxton, John Carter, Anthony Davis, Roscoe Mitchell, James Newton, Wadada Leo Smith, Vienna Art Orchestra, and World Saxophone Quartet.
