= Roscoe Mitchell =

American composer and jazz musician

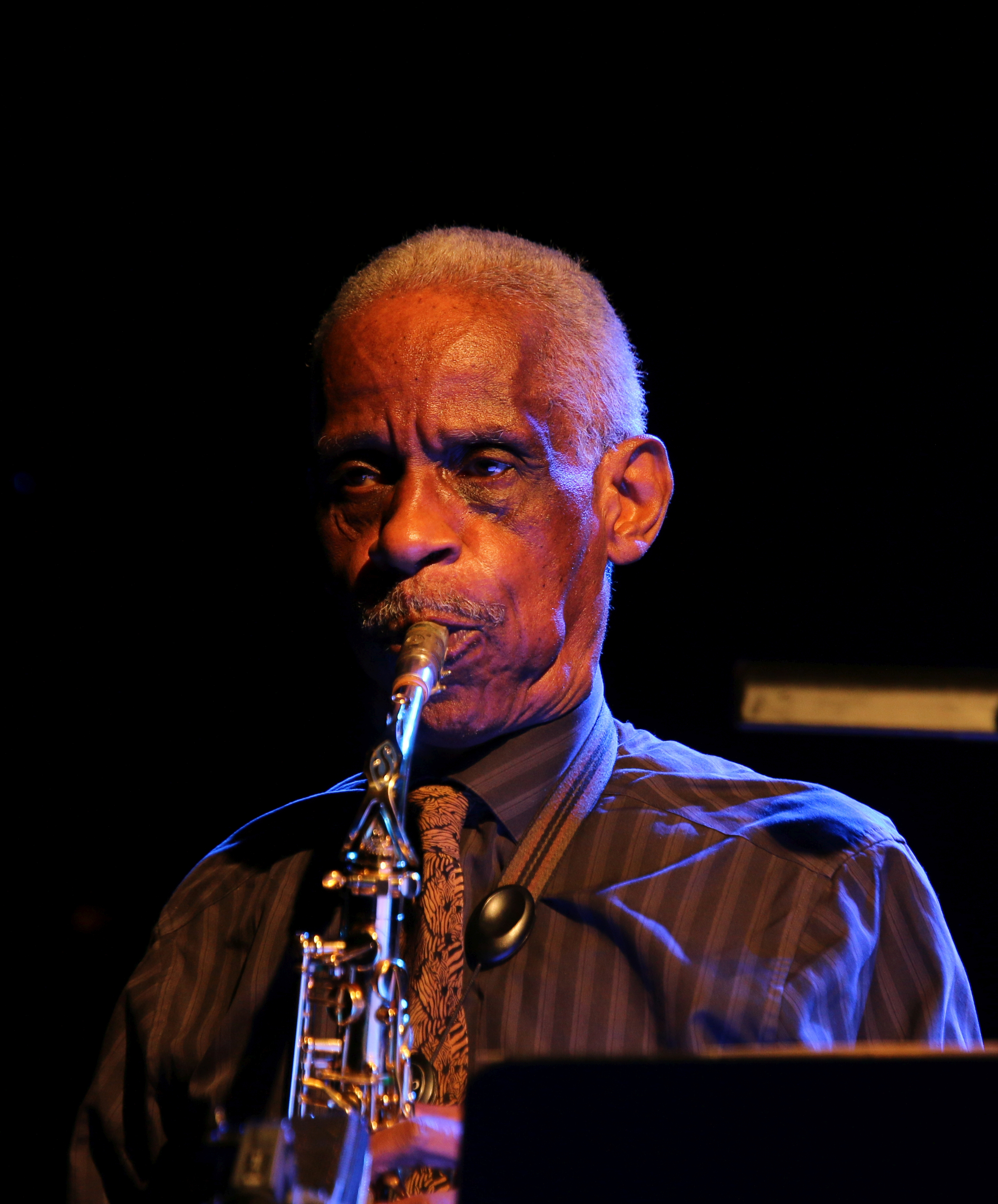
- Mitchell at the German Jazz Festival, 2015

Background information
- Born: August 3, 1940 (age 86); Chicago, Illinois, U.S.
- Genre: Jazz
- Occupation: Musician
- Instruments: Saxophone; flute
- Years active: 1960s–present

Roscoe Mitchell (born August 3, 1940) is an American composer, jazz instrumentalist, and educator, known for being "a technically superb – if idiosyncratic – saxophonist". The Penguin Guide to Jazz described him as "one of the key figures" in avant-garde jazz; All About Jazz stated in 2004 that he had been "at the forefront of modern music" for more than 35 years. Critic Jon Pareles in The New York Times has mentioned that Mitchell "qualifies as an iconoclast". In addition to his own work as a bandleader, Mitchell is known for cofounding the Art Ensemble of Chicago and the Association for the Advancement of Creative Musicians (AACM).

== History ==
=== Early life ===
Mitchell, who is African American, was born in Chicago, Illinois, United States. He grew up in the Chicago area, where he played saxophone and clarinet at around age twelve. His family was always involved in music with many different styles playing in the house when he was a child as well as having a secular music background. His brother, Norman, in particular was the one who introduced Mitchell to jazz. While attending Englewood High School in Chicago, he furthered his study of the clarinet. In the 1950s, he joined the United States Army, during which time he was stationed in Heidelberg, Germany and played in military parades with fellow saxophonists Albert Ayler and Rubin Cooper, the latter of whom, Mitchell commented, "took me under his wing and taught me a lot of stuff". He also studied under the first clarinetist of the Heidelberg Symphony while in Germany. Mitchell returned to the United States in the early 1960s, relocated to the Chicago area, and performed in a band with Wilson Junior College undergraduates Malachi Favors (bass), Joseph Jarman, Henry Threadgill, and Anthony Braxton (all saxophonists). Mitchell also studied with Muhal Richard Abrams and played in his band, the Muhal Richard Abrams' Experimental Band, starting in 1961.

=== AACM and the Art Ensemble of Chicago ===
In 1965, Mitchell was one of the first members of the non-profit organization Association for the Advancement of Creative Musicians (AACM), along with Jodie Christian (piano), Steve McCall (drums), and Phil Cohran (composer). The following year Mitchell, Lester Bowie (trumpet), Kalaparusha Maurice McIntyre (tenor saxophone), Favors, Lester Lashley (trombone), and Alvin Fielder (drums), recorded their first studio album, Sound. The album was "a departure from the more extroverted work of the New York-based free jazz players", due in part to the band recording with "unorthodox devices" such as toys and bicycle horns.

From 1967, Mitchell, Bowie, Favors and, on occasion, Jarman performed as the Roscoe Mitchell Art Ensemble, then the Art Ensemble, and finally in 1969 were billed as the Art Ensemble of Chicago. The group included Phillip Wilson on drums for short span before he joined Paul Butterfield's band. The group lived and performed in Europe from 1969 to 1971, though they arrived without any percussionist after Wilson left. To fill the void, Mitchell commented that they "evolved into doing percussion ourselves". The band did eventually get a percussionist, Don Moye, who Mitchell had played with before and was living in Europe at that time. For performances, the band often wore brilliant costumes and painted their faces. The Art Ensemble of Chicago have been described as becoming "possibly the most highly acclaimed jazz band" in the 1970s and 1980s.

=== Creative Arts Collective and beyond ===
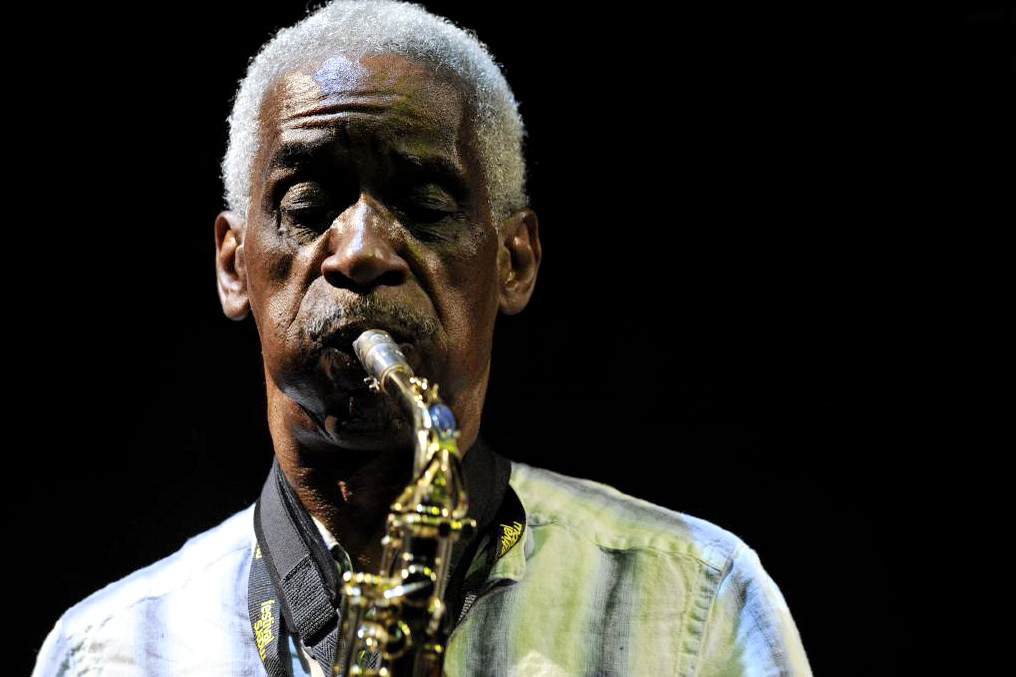
Mitchell at the Moers Festival, 2009

Mitchell and the others returned to the States in 1971. After having been back in Chicago for three years, Mitchell then established the Creative Arts Collective (CAC) in 1974 that had a similar musical aesthetic to the AACM. The group was based in East Lansing, Michigan and frequently performed in auditoriums at Michigan State University. Mitchell also formed the Sound Ensemble in the early 1970s, an "outgrowth of the CAC" in his words, that consisted mainly of Mitchell, Hugh Ragin, Jaribu Shahid, Tani Tabbal, and Spencer Barefield.

In the 1990s, Mitchell started to experiment in classical music with such composers/artists such as Pauline Oliveros, Thomas Buckner, and Borah Bergman, the latter two of which formed a trio with Mitchell called Trio Space. Buckner was also part of another group with Mitchell and Gerald Oshita called "Space" in the late 1990s. He then conceived the Note Factory in 1992 with various old and new collaborators as another evolution of the Sound Ensemble.

He lived in the area of Madison, Wisconsin and performed with a re-assembled Art Ensemble of Chicago. In 1999, the band was hit hard with the death of Bowie, but Mitchell fought off the urge to recast his position in the group, stating simply "You can't do that" in an interview with Allaboutjazz.com editor-in-chief Fred Jung. The band continued on despite the loss.

Mitchell has made a point of working with younger musicians in various ensembles and combinations, many of whom were not yet born when the first Art Ensemble recordings were made. Mainly from Chicago, these players include trumpeter Corey Wilkes, bassist Karl E. H. Seigfried, and drummer Isaiah Spencer.

In 2007, Mitchell was named Darius Milhaud Chair of Composition at Mills College in Oakland, California, where he currently lives. Mitchell was chosen by Jeff Mangum of Neutral Milk Hotel to perform at the All Tomorrow's Parties festival in March 2012 in Minehead, England.

=== Teaching ===
Mitchell has taught at the University of Illinois, the University of Wisconsin–Madison, and the California Institute of the Arts. From 2007 to 2019 Mitchell has taught at Mills College in Oakland, California. Among his notable students is Dave Soldier.

== Awards and honors ==
The following are referenced from Mitchell's biography at the official AACM website.

Awards

- DownBeat magazine: Talent Deserving Wider Recognition, Best Jazz Group (Established, Art Ensemble of Chicago), Record of the Year (Nonaah)
- Madison Music Legend, Madison magazine
- Certificate of Appreciation, St. Louis Public Schools Role Model Experiences Program
- Certificate of Appreciation, Art Ensemble of Chicago (Smithsonian Institution)
- Honorary Citizen of Atlanta, Georgia
- International Jazz Critics Poll
- Jazz Personality of the Year, City of Madison, Wisconsin
- Image Award, National Association for the Advancement of Colored People
- Jazz Master, National Endowment for the Arts
- Outstanding Service to Jazz Education Award, National Association of Jazz Educators

Grants

- Arts Midwest Jazz Masters
- Comnicut Foundation
- Dane County Cultural Affairs Commission Project Grant, Madison Committee for the Arts
- Foundation for Contemporary Arts Grants to Artists Award (1996)
- Institut de Recherche at Coordination Acoustique Musique, Paris, France
- Madison Festival of the Lakes Grant
- Meet the Composer, Cultural Series Grant, Center for International Performance and Exhibition, Chicago
- Michigan State University matching grant
- Minnesota Composer's Forum
- National Endowment for the Arts
- Wisconsin Arts Board

== Discography ==
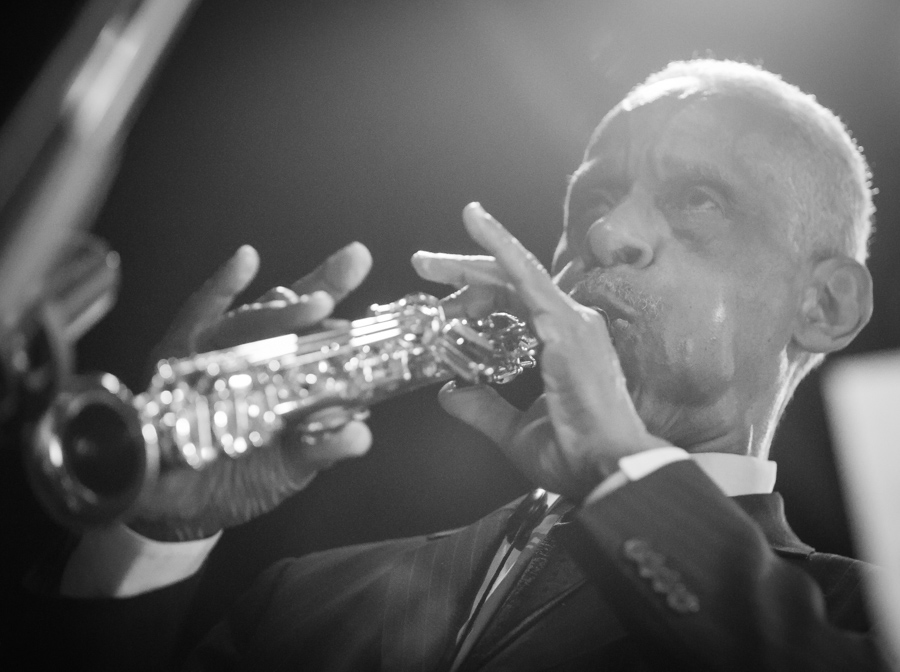
At the 2017 Kongsberg Jazzfestival

=== With Art Ensemble of Chicago ===
Title	Year	Label
Sound - Roscoe Mitchell Sextet	1966	Delmark
Old/Quartet - Roscoe Mitchell	1967	Nessa
Numbers 1 & 2 - Lester Bowie	1967	Nessa
Early Combinations - Art Ensemble	1967	Nessa
Congliptious - Roscoe Mitchell Art Ensemble	1968	Nessa
A Jackson in Your House	1969	Actuel
Tutankhamun	1969	Freedom
The Spiritual	1969	Freedom
People in Sorrow	1969	Pathé-Marconi
Message to Our Folks	1969	Actuel
Reese and the Smooth Ones	1969	Actuel
Eda Wobu	1969	JMY
Certain Blacks	1970	America
Go Home	1970	Galloway
Chi-Congo	1970	Paula
Les Stances a Sophie	1970	Pathé-Marconi
Live in Paris	1970	Freedom
Art Ensemble of Chicago with Fontella Bass	1970	America
Phase One	1971	America
Live at Mandell Hall	1972	Delmark
Bap-Tizum	1972	Atlantic
Fanfare for the Warriors	1973	Atlantic
Kabalaba	1974	AECO
Nice Guys	1978	ECM
Live in Berlin	1979	West Wind
Full Force	1980	ECM
Urban Bushmen	1980	ECM
Among the People	1980	Praxis
The Complete Live in Japan	1984	DIW
The Third Decade	1984	ECM
Naked	1986	DIW
Ancient to the Future	1987	DIW
The Alternate Express	1989	DIW
Art Ensemble of Soweto	1990	DIW
America - South Africa	1990	DIW
Thelonious Sphere Monk with Cecil Taylor	1990	DIW
Dreaming of the Masters Suite	1990	DIW
Live at the 6th Tokyo Music Joy with Lester Bowie's Brass Fantasy	1991	DIW
Fundamental Destiny with Don Pullen	1991	AECO
Salutes the Chicago Blues Tradition	1993	AECO
Coming Home Jamaica	1996	Atlantic
Urban Magic	1997	Musica Jazz
Tribute to Lester	2001	ECM
Reunion	2003	Around Jazz
The Meeting	2003	Pi
Sirius Calling	2004	Pi
Non-Cognitive Aspects of the City	2006	Pi
We Are On the Edge	2019	Pi
The Sixth Decade From Paris To Paris	2023	Rogue Art

=== Roscoe Mitchell and the Sound Ensemble ===
- Snurdy McGurdy and Her Dancin' Shoes (Nessa, 1981)
- 3 x 4 Eye (Black Saint, 1981)
- Roscoe Mitchell and the Sound and Space Ensembles (Black Saint, 1983)
- Live at the Knitting Factory (Black Saint, 1987)
- Live in Detroit (Cecma, 1988)

=== Roscoe Mitchell and the Space Ensemble ===
- New Music For Woodwinds and Voice (1750 Arch, 1981)
- Roscoe Mitchell and the Sound and Space Ensembles (Black Saint, 1983)
- An Interesting Breakfast Conversation (1750 Arch, 1984)

=== Roscoe Mitchell and the Note Factory ===
- This Dance Is for Steve McCall (Black Saint, 1993)
- Nine to Get Ready (ECM, 1999)
- Song for My Sister (Pi, 2002)
- The Bad Guys (Around Jazz, 2003)
- Far Side with The Note Factory (ECM, 2010)

=== Solo Albums ===
- Solo Saxophone Concerts (Sackville, 1974)
- Nonaah (Nessa, 1976)
- L-R-G / The Maze / S II Examples (Nessa, 1978)
- Live at the Muhle Hunziken (Cecma, 1986)
- Duets & Solos (Black Saint, 1993)
- Sound Songs (Delmark, 1997)
- Solo [3] (Mutable, 2004)
- Dots/Pieces for Percussion and Woodwinds (Wide Hive, 2021)

=== Other ensembles ===
- Before There Was Sound (Nessa, 1965; 2011)
- Sound (Delmark, 1966)
- Roscoe Mitchell Quartet (Sackville, 1976)
- Nonaah (Nessa, 1976)
- Duets with Anthony Braxton (Sackville, 1977)
- L-R-G / The Maze / S II Examples (Nessa, 1978)
- Sketches from Bamboo (Moers Music, 1979)
- More Cutouts (Cecma, 1981)
- The Flow of Things (Black Saint, 1986)
- Four Compositions (Lovely Music, 1987)
- Songs in the Wind (Victo, 1991)
- After Fallen Leaves (Silkheart, 1992)
- Duets & Solos (Black Saint, 1993)
- The Italian Concert (with Borah Bergman) (Soul Note, 1994)
- Hey Donald (Delmark, 1995)
- First Meeting (Knitting Factory, 1995)
- Pilgrimage (Lovely Music, 1995)
- The Day and the Night (Dizim, 1997)
- In Walked Buckner (Delmark, 1999)
- 8 O'Clock: Two Improvisations (Mutable Music, 2001)
- First Look, Chicago Duos (Southport, 2005)
- Turn (RogueArt, 2005)
- No Side Effects (RogueArt, 2006)
- Composition/Improvisation Nos. 1, 2 & 3 with Evan Parker (ECM, 2007)
- Contact (RogueArt, 2007)
- Spectrum (Mutable, 2010)
- Numbers (RogueArt, 2011)
- Three Compositions with Nicole Mitchell's Black Earth Ensemble (RogueArt, 2012)
- Duets with Tyshawn Sorey and Special Guest Hugh Ragin (Wide Hive, 2013)
- Improvisations (Otoroku, 2013) with Tony Marsh and John Edwards
- Conversations I (Wide Hive Records, 2014) with Craig Taborn and Kikanju Baku
- Conversations II (Wide Hive Records, 2014) with Craig Taborn and Kikanju Baku
- In Pursuit of Magic (482 Music, 2014) with Mike Reed
- Angel City (RogueArt, 2014) Roscoe Mitchell Trio with James Fei & William Winant
- Celebrating Fred Anderson (Nessa, 2015)
- Four Ways (Nessa, 2017) with Yuganaut
- Bells for the South Side (ECM, 2017)
- Discussions (Wide Hive Records, 2017)
- Accelerated Projection (RogueArt, 2018) with Matthew Shipp
- Ride the Wind (Nessa, 2018)
- Roscoe Mitchell Orchestra Littlefield Concert Hall Mills College (Wide Hive Records, 2019)
- Flow States (ScienSonic, 2020) with Marshall Allen, Milford Graves, and Scott Robinson
- Distant Radio Transmission (Wide Hive, 2020)
- One Head Four People (Wide Hive, 2024)

=== As sideman ===
With Anthony Braxton

- Creative Orchestra Music 1976 (Arista, 1976)
- For Trio (Arista, 1978)

With Jodie Christian

- Rain or Shine (Delmark, 1994)
- Soul Fountain (Delmark, 1998)

With Jack DeJohnette

- Made in Chicago (ECM, 2013 [2015]) with Muhal Richard Abrams, Larry Gray and Henry Threadgill

With Sunny Murray

- Sunshine (BYG, 1969)

With Evan Parker

- Boustrophedon (ECM, 2004)

With Mike Reed's Loose Assembly

- Empathetic Parts (482 Music, 2010)

With Matthew Shipp

- 2-Z (2.13.61, 1996)

With Alan Silva

- Seasons (BYG, 1971)

With Wadada Leo Smith

- Budding of a Rose (Moers Music, 1979)
