= Baker's Keyboard Lounge =

Jazz club in Detroit, Michigan, US

Coordinates: 42.4454°N 83.1416°W

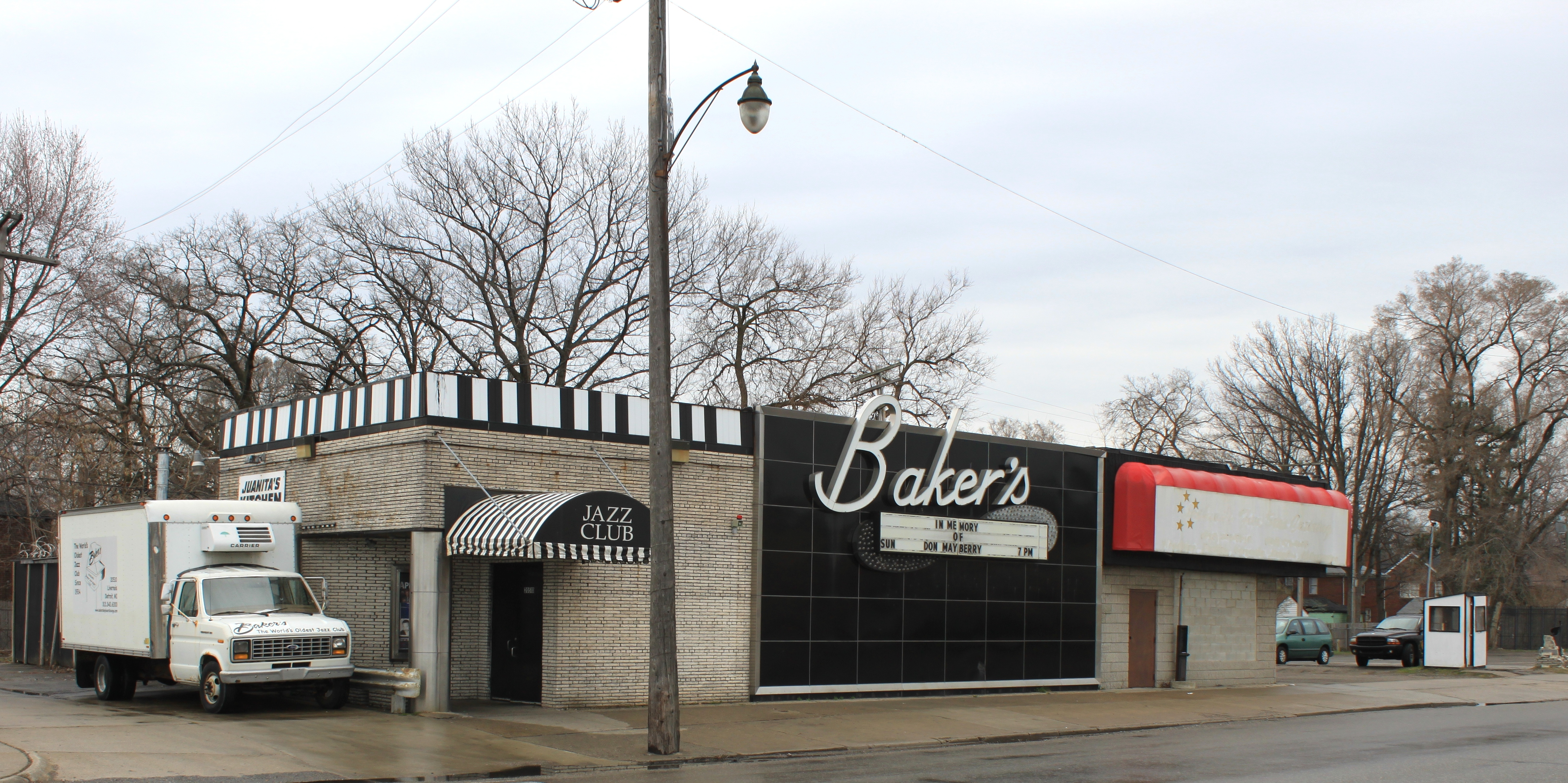
- Interactive map of Baker's Keyboard Lounge
- Address: 20510 Livernois Avenue; Detroit, Michigan

Baker's Keyboard Lounge is a jazz club located at 20510 Livernois Avenue in Detroit, Michigan. It was founded in May 1933 and is the oldest continuously operated jazz club in Detroit.

== History ==
=== Early history ===
In 1933 Chris and Fannie Baker opened Baker's as a lunchtime sandwich restaurant. In 1934 their son Clarence Baker began booking jazz pianists, but Baker's was still known at that time principally as a restaurant. In 1939 Clarence took over ownership after Chris had suffered from a stroke. That same year, Clarence began booking pianists from outside the Detroit area, although the club featured local pianist Pat Flowers from 1940 until 1954. In 1952, the club was expanded and remodeled to the Art Deco look that it retains today. By 1954, the business had rapidly expanded, and by the following year, Baker's began featuring major jazz acts, notably Art Tatum who played the last two years of his life, Dave Brubeck in 1957 and Gerry Mulligan in 1958. During the 1950s "modern" jazz was less common at Baker's than it was in the 1960s, when the emphasis of the club's music changed to Hard Bop. During the 1960s Clarence leased the club out, but resumed personal control in the 1970s.

Baker's is noted for its long history of presenting local and major jazz acts, its excellent acoustics, its intimacy – seating only 99, its Art Deco furnishings, including a distinctive, piano-shaped bar painted with a keyboard motif, Art Deco style paintings of European city landscapes by Harry Julian Carew, tilted mirrors that allow patrons to view the pianist's hands, and its Steinway piano which was selected and purchased in New York by Tatum for Clarence in the 1950s. The club still displays its original liquor pricelist from 1934, showing the price of beer at 26 cents.

In 1986, Baker's was designated as an Historic Site by the Michigan State Historic Preservation Office. The historic significance of the site is stated as follows:

Baker's Keyboard Lounge has significance as Michigan's jazz mecca and Detroit's oldest jazz club in continuous operation. Founded in May 1933 by Chris Baker as a restaurant and piano bar, the present jazz orientation of the club has been firmly in place since 1939. Baker's Keyboard Lounge has hosted the greatest names in blues and jazz since that date. Some of the musicians who have played the club include: Ella Fitzgerald, Miles Davis, Oscar Peterson, George Shearing, Sarah Vaughn, Joe Williams, Maynard Ferguson, Cab Calloway, Woody Herman, Modern Jazz Quartet, and Nat "King" Cole; to name but a few. In 1984, Baker's Keyboard Lounge celebrated fifty-years of the sound of jazz in Detroit and Michigan.

=== Recent history ===
The popularity of the club declined in the 1970s and 1980s, and was nearly closed on several occasions. In 1996, after owning the club for 57 years, Clarence Baker sold the club to John Colbert and Juanita Jackson. The new owners were challenged by declining interests in live jazz performances, due to the aging of the fanbase of jazz purists, a shift to mainstream jazz from the historic Hard Bop emphasis of the club, and the popularity of hip hop. The new ownership attempted to compensate with fundraisers, a reduction in bookings of nationally known acts and emphasis on local artists, and diversifying the lineup to include R&B and comedy acts. The club experienced a resurgence in popularity, but the downturn in the economy led Colbert to declare bankruptcy in 2010, leading to widespread speculation that the club would finally close. In 2011, the club was purchased at a bankruptcy sale, by Hugh W. Smith III, who had been manager of the club for the previous two years, currently promotes, operates and oversees and Eric Whitaker Sr. Smith and Whitaker vowed to keep Baker's open as a jazz club.

In 2016, The Detroit City Council approved an ordinance to establish the Baker's Keyboard Lounge Historic District, a designation that prevents whoever owns the building from demolishing it or altering its exterior without permission from the Detroit Historic District Commission.

With the economic and cultural resurgence of Detroit, Baker's is again receiving notable media coverage.

== Notable performers and performances ==
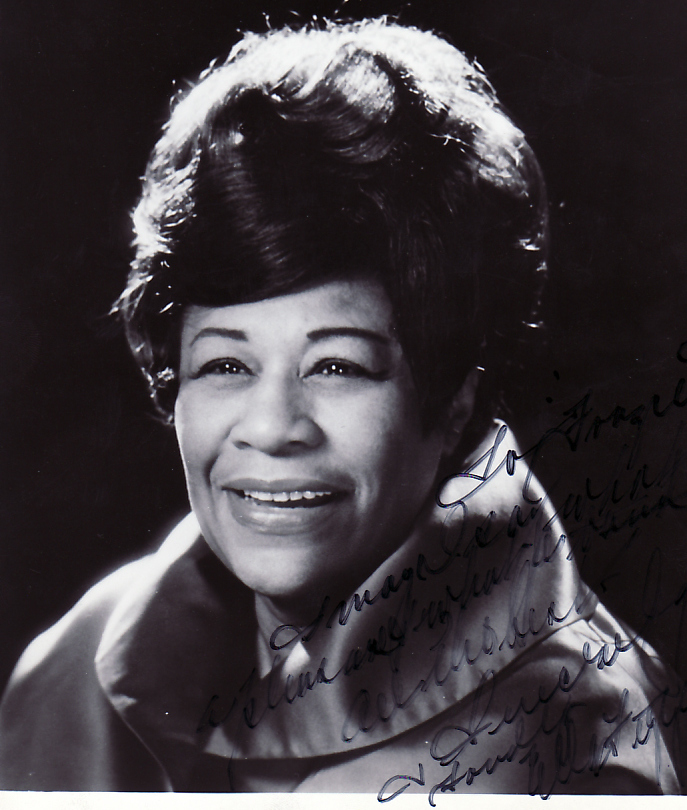
Ella Fitzgerald

Many famous musicians, especially jazz musicians, have played in the club during its history, such as Louis Armstrong, John Coltrane, Oscar Peterson, Fats Waller, Wes Montgomery, Meade Lux, Erroll Garner, Art Tatum, Pat Flowers, Nat King Cole, Ella Fitzgerald, Tommy Flanagan, George Shearing, Chet Baker, Gerry Mulligan, Cab Calloway, Betty Carter, Eddie Jefferson, Kai Winding, the Modern Jazz Quartet, Sonny Stitt, Kenny Burrell, Barry Harris, Donald Byrd, Earl Klugh, Pepper Adams, and Miles Davis have all performed at the club. Gene Krupa performed with his Quartet for several engagements at Baker's.

Terry Pollard was discovered by Terry Gibbs while playing at Baker's in 1952–53, subsequently joining the Terry Gibbs Quartet for a national tour.

Baker's is the site of an incident in 1954 involving Miles Davis which is credited by some for Davis breaking his heroin addiction. The widely related version of the story, attributed to Richard (Prophet) Jennings is that Davis, while in Detroit playing at the Blue Bird club (as a guest soloist in Billy Mitchell's house band along with Flanagan, Elvin Jones, Carter, Yusef Lateef, Barry Harris, Thad Jones, Curtis Fuller and Donald Byrd) stumbled into Baker's out of the rain, soaking wet and carrying his trumpet in a paper bag under his coat, walked to the bandstand and interrupted Max Roach and Clifford Brown in the midst of performing "Sweet Georgia Brown" by beginning to play "My Funny Valentine", and then, after finishing the song, stumbled back into the rainy night. Davis was supposedly embarrassed into getting clean by this incident. In his autobiography, Davis disputed this account, stating that Roach had requested that Davis play with him that night, and that the details of the incident, such as carrying his horn in a paper bag and interrupting Roach and Brown, were fictional and that his decision to quit heroin was unrelated to the incident.

Then-unknown Barbra Streisand performed at Baker's in 1961.

Charles Mingus's September 1969 performances at Baker's were a part of his comeback in that year.

Klugh credits his frequenting Baker's as a teenager in the early 1970s, chaperoned by his mother, as a significant factor in the development of his music career, enabling him to meet prominent artists who were playing there, such as George Benson, Chick Corea and Lateef, each of whom he then toured or recorded with, and Bill Evans who was a central influence on Klugh's songwriting.

Jazz singer Eddie Jefferson was shot and killed at Baker's Keyboard Lounge on May 8, 1979. He had left the club with alto sax man Richie Cole around 1:35 a.m. and was shot while walking out of the building.

== Recordings and music videos ==
Father Tom Vaughan recorded the 1967 RCA Victor album Motor City Soul at Baker's.

Woody Shaw recorded his posthumously released 1997 album Bemsha Swing for Blue Note at Baker's in 1986, along with Geri Allen, Robert Hurst and Roy Brooks.

In 1987, Anita Baker filmed the music video for the track "Same Ole Love" from her album Rapture at Baker's.

Saxophonist James Carter recorded the album Live at Baker's Keyboard Lounge, also featuring David Murray, Franz Jackson and Johnny Griffin at Baker's in June 2001.

== Cultural references ==
Baker's piano-shaped bar inspired Liberace to install his famous piano-shaped swimming pool at his home in Beverly Hills.

The 2002 documentary film Standing in the Shadows of Motown includes film of a performance by the Funk Brothers at Baker's.

Kenny Dixon Jr.'s 2004 album Black Mahogani includes the track "Back at Bakers (on Livernois)"

Baker's is the setting for a performance by one of the principal characters in Cheryl Robinson's 2005 novel If It Ain't One Thing.

Baker's is the scene of a chapter in E.M. Broner's 2010 novel, The Red Squad.

Baker's is referenced on the ABC police procedural drama Detroit 1-8-7.

Baker's is mentioned by the Catherine O'Hara character Dusty Towne in a skit called "The Dusty Towne Sexy Holiday Special" on SCTV. She introduces Andrea Martin, playing a Solid Gold Dancer, as her first guest saying, "You know, the special thing about her is that I used to work with her mother at Baker's Keyboard Lounge in Detroit."

Baker's is featured in a scene in the 2012 film Sparkle.

== See also ==
- List of jazz clubs
