= Reginald Veal =

American jazz musician (born 1963)

Reginald Veal (born November 5, 1963) is an American jazz bassist and multi-instrumentalist from New Orleans, Louisiana.

Veal grew up in New Orleans where he began piano lessons at a very early age. After receiving a bass guitar as a gift from his father at the age of eight, Veal went on to later join his father's gospel group as the bassist. Veal studied with the legendary New Orleans bassist Walter Payton. He attended Southern University, studying bass trombone with the clarinetist Alvin Batiste. Veal was a touring bassist with pianist and teacher Ellis Marsalis from 1985 to 1989, and during this time he also worked with Pharoah Sanders, Elvin Jones, Charlie Rouse, Hamiet Bluiett, Harry Connick Jr., Terence Blanchard, Dakota Staton, Donald Harrison and Marcus Roberts.

Veal began playing in the Wynton Marsalis Quintet in 1987, which became the Wynton Marsalis Septet in 1988. He is the original bassist for the Lincoln Center Jazz Orchestra. Veal has worked with Ahmad Jamal, McCoy Tyner, Branford Marsalis, Cassandra Wilson, Courtney Pine, Yusuf Lateef, Nicholas Payton, Eric Reed, Dianne Reeves, Junko Onishi, Mark Whitfield and Greg Tardy. Today, Veal resides on the West Coast where he continues to record and tour.

== Discography ==
- Gold Sounds with James Carter, Cyrus Chestnut, Ali Jackson (Brown Brothers, 2005)
- And to the Republic with Eric Lewis, Jeff "Tain" Watts (Sunnyside, 2016)
