= Steve Kirby (musician) =

American jazz musician

Steve Kirby is an American jazz bassist, composer, and educator.

== Biography ==
Kirby was born in Maumee Valley, Toledo, Ohio, and his family moved to St. Louis when he was two years old. He began playing guitar and bass guitar while stationed at Fort Bragg, and following this he attended Webster University, receiving his degree in 1985. He worked in ensembles and then got his master's degree at the Manhattan School of Music, where he played with Lester Bowie. In 1988 he returned to Webster, where he taught until 1993.

In January 2017, Kirby released All Over the Map, his first orchestral recording featuring his compositions. Kirby appeared as a leader on the albums Wicked Grin (2008) and Stepchild (2013), featuring the University of Manitoba Jazz Faculty Ensemble. He spent 15 years heading the University of Manitoba Jazz Studies program.

He has worked with Wessell Anderson, Kenny Barron, Kathleen Battle, Joanne Brackeen, James Carter, Regina Carter, Cyrus Chestnut, Wycliffe Gordon, Benny Green, Terreon Gully, Slide Hampton, Winard Harper, Stefon Harris, Antonio Hart, Eddie Henderson, John Hicks, Elvin Jones, Geoff Keezer, Oliver Lake, Abbey Lincoln, Joe Lovano, Wynton Marsalis, Mulgrew Miller, Claudio Roditi, Wallace Roney, Jacky Terrasson, Steve Turre, Warren Wolf, and Miguel Zenon.

Steve now performs and tours under the name Obasi Akoto.

=== Teaching ===
Kirby joined the faculty of music at the University of Manitoba in 2003, where he then created the first and only Jazz Studies Program in Canada where a student can receive a Bachelors Degree in Jazz Studies specifically. He was promoted to full professor and received tenure.

In January 2004, Kirby became artistic director for the Smart Park Jazz Innovators Series. As Artistic Director and bass player, Steve facilitated and performed with some of the best artists in Jazz: trombonist, Wycliffe Gordon, violinist, Regina Carter, trumpeter Nicholas Payton and vocalist Luciana Souza. All artists stayed for 1 week residencies that included master-classes, rehearsals for students and a concert at the end of the week.

In March 2004, he spearheaded the creation of what has become a weekly jazz institution in Winnipeg – the "COOL Monday Night Hang." Taking its cue from the many jam sessions Steve participated in as a professional musician in New York, "The Hang" is a place where students, faculty, seasoned professionals, and visiting artists can hone their skills and exchange ideas in a live performance setting.

SK was the creator and editor in chief for Dig! magazine in Winnipeg. Launched by SK in 2004, dig! It was designed to mirror the growth and gauge the health of Winnipeg's Jazz scene. The magazine also served to co-ordinate and promote the Jazz events that the many local and visiting presenters offer in Winnipeg and throughout the province. The last issue of dig! Magazine was published in the summer of 2017.

In 2005 SK created Jazz On Wheels, his version of New York's famous Jazz Mobile. Designed as a mobile concert stage, Jazz on Wheels literally drove music to people in their own neighborhoods. Featuring local and touring jazz musicians, the project provided Winnipeggers of all social and economic backgrounds with opportunities to learn about jazz through concerts and workshops brought directly to their communities. Jazz on Wheels features interactive presentations illustrating the evolution of jazz and its influence on modern popular music.

2005 - 2016, SK held the position of artistic director for the Izzy Asper Jazz Performance Series. In this series Steve not only performed with many of the visiting artists but also has created a unique opportunity for the U of M Jazz students to perform as the opening band for the all-star visiting artists. Each artist also presented master classes to the jazz students.

=== Harassment allegations ===
He retired on June 27, 2017, after his scheduled sabbatical, during which an internal investigation into alleged sexual harassment of students was conducted by the university. Six students approached school administration in February 2017 with complaints of sexual harassment by Kirby. Shortly after retiring from the University of Manitoba, Kirby was hired by Berklee College of Music but was suspended from his position pending an investigation into allegations of sexual harassment at the University of Manitoba. Administration at Berklee put Kirby on leave after learning about the accusations.

On May 9, 2018, after an investigation by Winnipeg police, Kirby was charged with sexual assault of a music student at the University of Manitoba, relating to multiple alleged incidents between 2014 and 2017. On March 7, 2019, Crown Prosecutor Mark Kantor announced that the case against Kirby would not proceed, and that the Crown was directing a stay of proceedings in this matter.

In August 2020, Steve Kirby was awarded $286,000 after an arbitrator, Arne Peltz, determined the University of Manitoba breached the professor's privacy. How his privacy was breached was not disclosed. In his decision, Peltz wrote he was prepared to order the University of Manitoba to give Steve Kirby his job back, but refrained when Steve Kirby did not want to return. Both Kirby and the University are bound to confidentiality moving forward.

== Discography ==
=== As leader ===
- All Over the Map (2017)
- Wicked Grin (DIG!, 2008)
- Stepchild (University Of Manitoba, Desautels Faculty Of Music, 2012)

With James Carter

- In Carterian Fashion (Atlantic, 1998)
- Chasin' the Gypsy (Atlantic, 2000)

With Cyrus Chestnut

- Dark Before the Dawn (Atlantic, 1994)
- Earth Stories (Atlantic, 1995)

== Bibliography ==
- Leonard Feather and Ira Gitler, The Biographical Encyclopedia of Jazz. Oxford, 1999, p. 367.
