= At the Crossroads =

At the Crossroads may refer to:

- At the Crossroads (album), a 2011 album by James Carter's Organ Trio
- At the Crossroads (1943 film), a Canadian film
- At the Crossroads (1942 film), a Hungarian drama film
