= Donald Washington =

Donald Washington may refer to:

- Donald Washington (American football) (born 1986), American football defensive back
- Donald Washington Sr. (1930–2009), American jazz tenor saxophonist
- Donald Washington (basketball) (born 1952), American basketball player
- Donald W. Washington (born 1955), American lawyer

== See also ==
- Donald, Washington, an unincorporated community in Yakima County, Washington, United States
