= Alone Together =

Alone Together may refer to:

== Music ==
=== Albums ===
- Alone Together (Benny Carter album), 1956
- Alone Together (Tony Bennett album), 1961
- Alone Together (Dave Mason album), 1970
- Alone Together (Ron Carter and Jim Hall album), 1972
- Alone Together (Donny Osmond album), 1973
- Alone Together (Clare Fischer album), 1977
- Alone Together (Tough Young Tenors album), 1991
- Alone Together: The Best of the Mercury Years, a 1995 album by Clifford Brown and Max Roach
- Alone Together (Lee Konitz album), 1996
- Alone Together (Gary Williams album), 2004
- Alone Together (Quidam album), 2007
- Alone Together (Catherine Russell album), 2019
- Alone Together (EP), a 2012 EP by Daley
- Alone Together (Pat Martino album), 2012
- Alone Together, a 2012 album by Karriem Riggins

=== Songs ===
- "Alone Together" (1932 song), a 1932 song by Arthur Schwartz and Howard Dietz
- "Alone, Together", a song from The Strokes' 2001 debut album Is This It
- "Alone, Together", a song from Infernal's 2010 album Fall from Grace
- "Alone Together", a 2012 song by British singer-songwriter Daley
- "Alone Together" (Fall Out Boy song), 2013

== Other uses ==
- Alone Together, a 2011 book by Sherry Turkle
- Alone Together (TV series), an American comedy series on Freeform
- "Alone Together" (Steven Universe), an episode of Steven Universe
- Alone/Together, a 2019 Filipino romance film directed by Antoinette Jadaone
- Charli XCX: Alone Together, a 2021 documentary about Charli XCX
- Alone Together (2023 film), a Peruvian drama film directed by Carmen Rojas Gamarra
- Alone Together (2022 film), an American romance film directed by Katie Holmes
- Alone Together (1990 film), a Spanish spy thriller film directed by Eduardo Campoy
