= Together Alone (disambiguation) =

Together Alone may refer to:

Music

- Together Alone, an album by Crowded House and also the closing track from that album
- Together Alone (Donnie Iris album), an album by Australian rock band Donnie Iris
- Together Alone (Anouk album), an album by Dutch singer Anouk
- Together Alone (Anthony Braxton and Joseph Jarman album), an album by American jazz saxophonists Joseph Jarman and Anthony Braxton
- Together Alone, a 2008 album by Chris While and Julie Matthews
- "Together Alone", a single from Melanie Safka's album Stoneground Words
- Together Alone (Alex Hepburn album), a debut album by British singer Alex Hepburn

Other

- Together Alone (film), a 1991 film written and directed by P.J. Castellaneta
- Together Alone, a book by Ron Falconer relating to Caroline Island

See also

- Alone Together (disambiguation)
