= Chasin' the Gypsy =

Studio album by James Carter
- Released: 2000
- Recorded: 2000
- Studio: Avatar, New York City
- Genre: Jazz
- Length: 54:25
- Label: Atlantic; 7567-83304-2
- Producer: Yves Beauvais, James Carter

James Carter chronology
In Carterian Fashion (1998)	Chasin' the Gypsy (2000)	Layin' in the Cut (2000)

Chasin' the Gypsy is the sixth album by saxophonist James Carter which was released on the Atlantic label in 2000.

== Reception ==
Professional ratings
Review scores
Source	Rating
AllMusic	4.5/5 stars
Robert Christgau	A
The Penguin Guide to Jazz Recordings	2.5/4 stars
The Rolling Stone Album Guide	5/5 stars

The AllMusic review by Richard S. Ginell says, " Chasin' the Gypsy, as you might guess, is an homage to Django Reinhardt, whose music Carter used to dig on Detroit radio when he was a teenager, but Carter doesn't take the predictable reverent path in paying his respects ... this is a delightful departure for Carter, though probably destined to be a one-off excursion". In JazzTimes Bill Milkowski wrote, "Just when you had him pegged as a rip-snorting tenor and bari monster with a wicked penchant for ferocious overblowing, he comes across as a shameless romantic on Chasin' the Gypsy, his lovely ode to Django. Still, Carter's characteristic bravado, tenor squeals, trills and remarkable displays of multiphonics are still intact here". On All About Jazz Mark Corroto noted, "Carter’s Reinhardt tribute, while appealing to traditional jazz fans, also has something to say to the Downtown crowd". Critic Robert Christgau rated the album an "A", saying, "this is the spirit marriage a tribute should be. It swings like a horse thief, parlays Fransay, and adores the melody".

== Track listing ==
1. "Nuages" (Django Reinhardt) - 5:36
2. "La Dernière Bergère (The Last Shepherdess)" (Alec Siniavine, Bernard Sauvat) - 6:34
3. "Manoir de Mes Reves (Django's Castle)" (Reinhardt) - 7:30
4. "Artillerie Lourde (Heavy Artillery)" (Reinhardt) - 6:55
5. "Chasin' the Gypsy" (James Carter) - 4:02
6. "Oriental Shuffle" (Reinhardt, Stéphane Grappelli) - 8:04
7. "I'll Never Be the Same" (Matty Malneckl, Frank Signorelli, Gus Kahn) - 7:17
8. "Avalon" (Vincent Rose, Buddy DeSylva, Al Jolson) - 4:38
9. "Imari's Lullaby" (James Carter) - 3:49

== Personnel ==
- James Carter - bass saxophone, tenor saxophone, mezzo-soprano saxophone, soprano saxophone
- Regina Carter - violin
- Jay Berliner - steel-string acoustic guitar
- Romero Lubambo - classical guitar
- Charles Giordano - accordion
- Steve Kirby - bass
- Cyro Baptista - percussion
- Joey Baron - drums
