= Gayelynn McKinney =

- Born: July 14, 1962 (age 63); Detroit, Michigan, US
- Education: Oakland University (BM)
- Genres: Jazz
- Occupations: Musician, composer, educator
- Instrument: Drums
- Website: www.gayelynnmckinney.com

Gayelynn McKinney (born July 14, 1962) is an American drummer, composer, and music educator from Detroit, Michigan.

== Early life and education ==
McKinney was born on July 14, 1962, in Detroit, Michigan. She was raised in a musical household; her father, Harold McKinney, was a jazz pianist and educator, and her mother, Gwendolyn McKinney, was a vocalist and performer. McKinney began playing the drums at age two and started lessons at age eight. She briefly considered quitting the drums due to social pressures regarding gender roles; however, she committed to the instrument upon learning of a performance by a young Terri Lyne Carrington with Clark Terry. Throughout middle school and high school, she studied multiple instruments, playing the clarinet and saxophone in school ensembles. By the tenth grade, she contributed as a drummer to her school's jazz band and as a saxophonist to the concert band.

McKinney's initial musical instruction was centered within the Detroit jazz community. She attended Oakland University, where she completed a Bachelor of Music degree in 1989.

== Career ==
=== Straight Ahead ===
In 1989, during her senior year of college, McKinney co-founded the all-female jazz group Straight Ahead with bassist Marion Hayden and violinist Regina Carter. Following a performance at the Montreux Jazz Festival in Switzerland where they opened for Nina Simone, the group signed with Atlantic Records in the early 1990s. They recorded three albums for the label and two independent releases.

=== Collaborations ===
McKinney's career has included several professional collaborations as a side musician and touring drummer. She performed as Aretha Franklin's drummer from 2016 until Franklin's final performance in 2017. In 2001, she toured Japan with the hip hop group Arrested Development.

She has performed or recorded with various artists, including Chaka Khan, Benny Golson, Roy Ayers, Geri Allen, Marcus Belgrave, Randy Brecker, Dee Dee Bridgewater, James Carter, Larry Coryell, Kevin Mahogany, Jason Marsalis, Freda Payne, and Steve Turre.

In 2022, she established the "Women Who Drum Festival", a free event in Detroit focused on female percussionists.

=== Academia ===
McKinney is a faculty member at Oakland University, where she teaches jazz percussion.

== Discography ==
=== As leader/co-leader ===
- It's About Time (2006)
- McKinFolk: The New Beginning (2018)
- Zoot Suit Funk (2021)

=== Straight Ahead ===
- Look Straight Ahead (Atlantic, 1992)
- Body and Soul (Atlantic, 1993)
- Dance of the Forest Rain (Atlantic, 1995)
