= Earth Stories =

Studio album by Cyrus Chestnut
- Released: 1996
- Recorded: November 28–30, 1995
- Studio: Mastersound, NYC
- Genre: Jazz
- Label: Atlantic
- Producer: Yves Beauvais, Cyrus Chestnut

Cyrus Chestnut chronology
Dark Before the Dawn (1994)	Earth Stories (1996)	Blessed Quietness (1996)

Earth Stories is an album by the American musician Cyrus Chestnut, released in 1996. It is dedicated to his grandmother. Chestnut supported the album with a North American tour. Earth Stories was a success on Billboard's Top Jazz Albums chart.

== Production ==
The album was produced by Yves Beauvais and Chestnut. Chestnut had originally envisioned a sextet recording before deciding that he wanted to be the prime mover of the music. He was backed by Alvester Garnett on drums and Steve Kirby on bass. He wrote nine of the album's 11 songs. Chestnut felt that the songs, in their different styles, were reflective of his personal history and his interest in the blues. He labeled "Cooldaddy's Perspective" "acoustic funk"; the horn section on the song included the saxophonists Steve Carrington and Antonio Hart and the trumpeter Eddie Allen. "East of the Sun and West of the Moon" includes a phrase from Barry Harris's "Nascimento". "Nutman's Invention #1" is played in a ragtime style. "In the Garden" is a version of the traditional spiritual.

== Critical reception ==
Professional ratings
Review scores
Source	Rating
AllMusic	4.5/5 stars
The Buffalo News	3.5/5 stars
Fort Worth Star-Telegram	4/5 stars
Los Angeles Times	3/4 stars
MusicHound Jazz: The Essential Album Guide	4/5 stars
New York Daily News	3/5 stars
The Penguin Guide to Jazz Recordings	3/4 stars
The Rolling Stone Jazz & Blues Album Guide	4/5 stars

The Los Angeles Times said that "the pianist plays with a drive that is enriched by his superb command of the keyboard... [he] moves comfortably throughout from simple melody to rhapsodic virtuosity." The Globe and Mail called Chestnut "a robust, hard-swinging pianist who gets around the keyboard very handily, though not always with particular finesse." The Times Colonist noted that Chestnut's "ballad readings carry a bluesy emotional wallop, and his upbeat compositions are propelled by rhythmically inventive, texturally sublime keyboard offerings." The New York Times stated that "Chestnut is after swing, the thrill of improvisation and blues tonality." The Washington Post deemed Earth Stories "the year's best jazz instrumental album".

== Track listing ==
No.	Title	Length
1.	"Decision, Decisions"
2.	"Grandma's Blues"
3.	"My Song in the Night"
4.	"Nutman's Invention #1"
5.	"Blues from the East"
6.	"Cooldaddy's Perspective"
7.	"Maria's Folly"
8.	"East of the Sun and West of the Moon"
9.	"Gomez"
10.	"Whoopi"
11.	"In the Garden"
