= Caribbean Rhapsody =

Studio album by James Carter
- Released: May 17, 2011
- Recorded: December 21, 2009 and March 18 & 19, 2010
- Studio: Witold Lutoslawski Concert Studio (Warsaw, Poland); Avatar Studios (New York, New York)
- Genre: Jazz
- Length: 45:00
- Label: EmArcy
- Producer: Michael Cuscuna

James Carter chronology
Heaven on Earth (2009)	Caribbean Rhapsody (2011)	At the Crossroads (2011)

Caribbean Rhapsody is an album by saxophonist James Carter composed and orchestrated by Roberto Sierra, released on the EmArcy label in 2011.

== Reception ==
Professional ratings
Review scores
Source	Rating
All About Jazz	4/5 stars
AllMusic	4/5 stars
The Guardian	4/5 stars

The AllMusic reviewer Matt Collar wrote: "A bold, adventurous performer with a titanic facility on the saxophone, Carter is perfectly suited for performing with large ensembles, and the orchestrations here are gorgeously rendered landscapes for Carter to play against. In fact, composer Sierra purposely left certain cadenzas and other areas of the scores on Caribbean Rhapsody open for Carter to improvise, and the results are nothing short of thrilling". In JazzTimes, Bill Beuttler commented: "It’s unusual, and remarkable, in that it’s a full-fledged orchestral work penned with Carter’s improvisational genius firmly in mind, and it manages to successfully blend rhythmic nods to Sierra’s native Puerto Rico". For All About Jazz, C. Michael Bailey said: "In a field populated by "good" and even "exceptional" recordings, it is nice to hear a Caribbean Rhapsody that is truly outstanding". The Guardian critic John Fordham wrote: "It's a stylish success in a crossover territory often fraught with pitfalls".

== Track listing ==
All compositions by Roberto Sierra, except where indicated.

1. "Concerto for Saxophones and Orchestra: Ritmico" - 4:52
2. "Concerto for Saxophones and Orchestra: Tender" - 7:04
3. "Concerto for Saxophones and Orchestra: Playful -- Fast (With Swing)" - 7:39
4. "Tenor Interlude" (James Carter) - 5:34
5. "Caribbean Rhapsody" - 13:37
6. "Soprano Interlude" (Carter) - 6:14

== Personnel ==
- James Carter - soprano saxophone, tenor saxophone
- Sinfonia Varsovia conducted by Giancarlo Guerrero (tracks 1–3)
- Regina Carter - solo violin (track 5)
- Akua Dixon String Quintet: (track 5)
  - Patrisa Tomasini, Chala Yancy - violin
  - Ron Lawrence - viola
  - Akua Dixon - cello
  - Kenny Davis - bass
