= Heaven on Earth (James Carter album) =

Live album by James Carter, John Medeski, Christian McBride, Adam Rogers, Joey Baron
- Released: August 25, 2009
- Recorded: May 8–9, 2009
- Venue: Blue Note, New York City
- Genre: Jazz
- Length: 66:46
- Label: Half Note; HN 4542
- Producer: Jeff Levenson

James Carter chronology
Present Tense (2008)	Heaven on Earth (2009)	Caribbean Rhapsody (2011)

Heaven on Earth is a live album by saxophonist James Carter, organist John Medeski, bassist Christian McBride, guitarist Adam Rogers and drummer Joey Baron recorded at the Blue Note Jazz Club, and released on the Half Note Records label in 2009.

== Reception ==
Professional ratings
Review scores
Source	Rating
AllMusic	3.5/5 stars
PopMatters	7/10 stars

The AllMusic reviewer, Matt Collar, commented: "More than just a live date, Heaven on Earth is a knotty, adventurous document that allows for as much group interplay as it does for spotlighting Carter's long-recognized virtuosity". JazzTimes critics rated the album 19th in their top 50 new releases of 2009. On All About Jazz, George Kanzler noted, "With the quintet on Heaven on Earth, putative leader James Carter (here playing mainly tenor sax, but also some baritone and soprano) pays homage to, while smartly updating the tradition of, populist jazz of the mid-20th century that once flourished in urban clubs and at JATP concerts. Sometimes hyphenated as soul-jazz, jazz-blues or funk-jazz, it embraced the groove and spirit of the black popular music of the day with in-your-face exuberance. Carter, whose lip-smacking, guttural vibrato recalls the honking saxists of early R'n'B, plays with a swashbuckling swagger that would have made PT Barnum proud". PopMatters critic Will Layman observed, "By mixing expertise with a healthy appetite for the avant-garde, Carter and his crew avoid The Problem of Too Much Precision. The saxophone playing is matched, tonally, by Medeski’s free-wheeling approach to the organ drawbars. So the whole band has a Jackson Pollack [sic] vibe, flinging color this way and that. And because the songs on Heaven on Earth are blues-drenched, the whole proceeding is grounded rather than precious".

== Track listing ==
1. "Diminishing" (Django Reinhardt) – 14:14
2. "Slam's Mishap" (Lucky Thompson) – 8:35
3. "Street of Dreams" (Victor Young, Sam M. Lewis) – 9:25
4. "Infiniment" (Traditional) – 10:39
5. "Blue Leo" (Leo Parker, Ike Quebec) – 12:19
6. "Heaven on Earth" (Larry Young) – 11:34

== Personnel ==
- James Carter – tenor saxophone, soprano saxophone, baritone saxophone
- John Medeski – organ
- Christian McBride – bass, electric bass
- Adam Rogers – guitar
- Joey Baron – drums
