= Present Tense (James Carter album) =

Studio album by James Carter
- Released: May 20, 2008
- Recorded: September 21–23, 2007
- Studio: Avatar (New York, New York)
- Genre: Jazz
- Length: 63:16
- Label: EmArcy; B0010985-02
- Producer: Michael Cuscuna

James Carter chronology
Gold Sounds (2006)	Present Tense (2008)	Heaven on Earth (2009)

Present Tense is an album by saxophonist James Carter released on the EmArcy label in 2008.

== Reception ==
Professional ratings
Review scores
Source	Rating
AllMusic	4/5 stars
All About Jazz	4/5 stars
The Guardian	4/5 stars

In the AllMusic review, Thom Jurek commented: "Present Tense showcases Carter at his most disciplined and ambitious ... This may be Carter's finest album because of its insistence on the balance between restraint and adventure". In JazzTimes, David R. Adler called the album "an unselfconscious mix of influences, more three-dimensional than his various tribute discs and the recent organ-trio blowouts". On All About Jazz Greg Camphire observed: "This solid, straight-ahead outing sounds both "old-timey" (in the best sense), with deep roots in blues and swing; and exploratory, never sacrificing Carter's personal approach, while maintaining his place in the jazz tradition". In The Guardian, critic John Fordham wrote: "The whole set is a jazz history, rescued from cheesiness by Carter's mastery of every technical detail".

== Track listing ==
All compositions by James Carter, except where indicated.

1. "Rapid Shave" (Dave Burns) - 7:28
2. "Bro. Dolphy" - 7:13
3. "Pour Que Ma Vie Demeure" (Django Reinhardt) - 5:05
4. "Sussa Nita" - 6:00
5. "Song of Delilah" (Victor Young, Ray Evans, Jay Livingston) - 5:11
6. "Dodo's Bounce" (Dodo Marmarosa) - 6:00
7. "Shadowy Sands" (Jimmy Jones) - 8:28
8. "Hymn of the Orient" (Gigi Gryce) - 4:23
9. "Bossa J.C." - 4:41
10. "Tenderly" (Walter Gross, Jack Lawrence) - 8:12

== Personnel ==
- James Carter - flute, bass clarinet, soprano saxophone, tenor saxophone, baritone saxophone
- Dwight Adams - trumpet, flugelhorn
- D. D. Jackson - piano
- Rodney Jones - guitar (tracks 4, 6 & 9)
- James Genus - bass
- Victor Lewis - drums
- Eli Fountain - congas, percussion (tracks 4, 7 & 9)
