= Alone Together (Tough Young Tenors album) =

Studio album by Tough Young Tenors
- Released: 1991
- Genre: Jazz
- Label: Antilles
- Producer: Billy Banks

Alone Together is the only album by the American jazz group Tough Young Tenors, released in 1991. The group included James Carter, Walter Blanding Jr., Todd Williams, Herb Harris, and Tim Warfield Jr., all on tenor saxophone. The album peaked at No. 5 on Billboard's Top Jazz Albums chart.

== Production ==
The album was produced by Billy Banks. The tenors were backed on some of the tracks by Marcus Roberts on piano, Ben Riley on drums, and Reginald Veal on bass. The album includes solo pieces, duets, and a closing number, "The Eternal Triangle", by Sonny Stitt, that features all five musicians. "Ask Me Now" was composed by Thelonious Monk. "Chelsea Bridge" is a version of the Billy Strayhorn song. "Stevie" was written by Duke Ellington. "Blues on the Corner" is a take on the McCoy Tyner number. "Calvary" is an interpretation of the traditional spiritual.

== Critical reception ==
Professional ratings
Review scores
Source	Rating
AllMusic	3/5 stars
Los Angeles Times	3.5/5 stars
North County Times	3.5/4 stars
The Philadelphia Inquirer	3/4 stars
The Star-Ledger	4/4 stars

The Washington Post stated that the album "works on several levels—as a series of individual and contrasting forums ... as a collection of colorful and often inspired duets; and as ensemble performances that climax in all five tenors collaborating on an exhilarating version of ... 'The Eternal Triangle'." The New York Times noted that there are "many critics and fans who will relish the revival of the tenor saxophone language, a distinct American creation... Full of bent and smeared and smudged notes, of ironic guffaws, of sleek responses to an unruly present, the tenor sound has new champions."

The Los Angeles Times opined that "the sounds created by the musicians on this unique project are closer to the robust, dark strains associated with such earlier sax influences as Ben Webster, Coleman Hawkins, Paul Gonsalves and Gene Ammons." The Philadelphia Inquirer concluded that Carter "is a clear standout, because his style is so close to a speaking voice ... he consistently stimulates the rhythm section". The Tucson Citizen listed Alone Together as the third best jazz album of 1991.

== Track listing ==
No.	Title	Length
1.	"Jim Dog"
2.	"Just You Just Me"
3.	"You Go to My Head"
4.	"Stevie"
5.	"The Break Through"
6.	"Alone Together"
7.	"Ask Me Now"
8.	"Blues on the Corner"
9.	"Chelsea Bridge"
10.	"Calvary"
11.	"The Eternal Triangle"
