= Ed Kirkeby =

American musician

Wallace Theodore "Ed" Kirkeby (October 10, 1891 – June 12, 1978) was an American bandleader, vocalist, manager, and salesman, best remembered as the manager of Fats Waller.

He was one of the first recording managers at Columbia Records to record jazz and organized the California Ramblers to record it. He recorded extensively during the 1920s and early 1930s using many pseudonyms for recording including The Little Ramblers, The Goofus Five, Five Birmingham Babies, The Vagabonds, The Varsity Eight, Ted Wallace (And His Campus Boys), Ed Kirkeby Wallace, and Eddie Lloyd (and Loyd). Over the years he also managed the Pickens Sisters, was an A&R person at RCA Victor, and worked in the band booking department at NBC. As Fats Waller's manager he also acted as his archivist building a collection which is held today by the Institute of Jazz Studies. After Waller's death in 1943 Kirkeby remained active managing many other groups and musicians (including Pat Flowers) through 1977.

== Discography ==
- The Columbia House Bands: Ed Kirkeby, Vol. 1

== Books ==
- Ain't Misbehavin' - Describes his years with Fats Waller
