= Franz Jackson =

American musician

Franz Jackson (November 1, 1912 – May 6, 2008) was an American saxophonist and clarinetist of the Chicago jazz school.

== Early life ==
Jackson was born in Rock Island, Illinois, United States on November 1, 1912. "He received his first lessons on saxophone from Jerome Don Pasquall and later studied at the Chicago Musical College."

== Later life and career ==
Early in his career, Jackson played with Albert Ammons's band. For much of the 1930s Jackson was based in Chicago. He toured with Fletcher Henderson in 1938, then played with Roy Eldridge's band in New York, and in 1940 toured with Fats Waller and then with Earl Hines. Following small band work back in New York, he "joined Cootie Williams's big band (1942), played in Boston with Frankie Newton (1942–3), toured with Eldridge (1944), and worked with Wilbur De Paris at Jimmy Ryan's in New York (1944–5)".

Jackson formed his own band in Chicago in 1957, the Original Jass All Stars. With this group, Jackson made overseas tours, including to play in Vietnam. He formed another band, the Jazz Entertainers, in 1980.

He moved to Dowagiac, Michigan in 1975. He died in Niles, Michigan, on May 6, 2008. A son and daughter survived him. "The Franz Jackson Collection at the Chicago Jazz Archive contains his papers and oral history material".

== Discography ==
=== As leader/co-leader ===
- No Saints (1957, Replica)
- A Night at the Red Arrow (1961, Pinnacle)
- Franz Jackson's Original Jass All-Stars Featuring Bob Shoffner (1961, Riverside)
- Let's Have a Party (1981, Pinnacle)
- Swing Thing (1984, Pinnacle)
- Snag It (1990, Delmark)
- Live at Windsor Jazz Festival III (1994, Parkwood)
- I Is What I Is (1997, Pinnacle)

=== As sideman ===
With Lil Armstrong

- Lil Armstrong and her Orchestra (1961, Riverside)

With James Carter

- Live at Baker's Keyboard Lounge (2001, Warner Bros.)

With Art Hodes

- Home Cookin' (1974, Jazzology)

With Laura Rucker

- Something's Wrong/Swing My Rhythm (1936, Decca)

With Edith Wilson

- He May Be your Man (But He Comes to See Me Sometimes) (1974, Delmark)
