= Natural Essence (Cyrus Chestnut album) =

Studio album by Cyrus Chestnut
- Released: May 20, 2016
- Recorded: November 17, 2015
- Studio: Yamaha Hall, New York, NY
- Genre: Jazz
- Length: 63:09
- Label: HighNote; HCD 7283
- Producer: Cyrus Chestnut

Cyrus Chestnut chronology
A Million Colors in Your Mind (2014)	Natural Essence (2016)	There's a Sweet, Sweet Spirit (2017)

Natural Essence is an album by pianist Cyrus Chestnut, recorded in 2015 and released on the HighNote label the following year.

== Reception ==
Professional ratings
Review scores
Source	Rating
AllMusic	4/5 stars

According to the AllMusic review by Matt Collar: "While the music here is more stripped down to the jazz essentials, they nonetheless tackle even the most well-known standard, like 'It Could Happen to You,' with a creative ebullience and in-the-moment spontaneity that grab your attention throughout. Also thrilling are the trio's takes on several original compositions".

In JazzTimes, Mike Joyce stated: "Chordal jabs, light-fingered trills, cascading runs, robust turnarounds-no question: Pianist Cyrus Chestnut is in delightfully animated form".

== Track listing ==
1. "Mamacita" (Joe Henderson) – 5:33
2. "It Could Happen to You" (Jimmy Van Heusen, Johnny Burke) – 7:12
3. "Faith Amongst the Unknown" (Cyrus Chestnut) – 6:15
4. "I Cover the Waterfront" (Johnny Green, Edward Heyman) – 6:57
5. "I Remember" (Chestnut) – 7:34
6. "Dedication" (Lenny White) – 8:01
7. "My Romance" (Richard Rodgers, Lorenz Hart) – 9:06
8. "Toku-Do" (Buster Williams) – 6:20
9. "Minority" (Gigi Gryce) – 6:11

== Personnel ==
- Cyrus Chestnut – piano
- Buster Williams - bass
- Lenny White – drums
