= A Million Colors in Your Mind =

Studio album by Cyrus Chestnut
- Released: April 21, 2015
- Recorded: November 24, 2014
- Studio: The Samurai Hotel Recording Studio, Astoria, NY
- Genre: Jazz
- Length: 56:43
- Label: HighNote; HCD 7271
- Producer: Cyrus Chestnut

Cyrus Chestnut chronology
Midnight Melodies (2014)	A Million Colors in Your Mind (2015)	Natural Essence (2016)

A Million Colors in Your Mind is an album by pianist Cyrus Chestnut, recorded in 2014 and released on the HighNote label the following year.

== Reception ==
Professional ratings
Review scores
Source	Rating
AllMusic	4/5 stars

The AllMusic review by Matt Collar stated: "the album finds Chestnut once again delving deep into his own colorfully chorded and swinging set of well-chosen cover songs. Although in his mid-fifties at the time of recording, Chestnut nonetheless wanted to record an album in which he could commune with musicians who were slightly older and more seasoned than himself ... Ultimately, Chestnut continues to dazzle with A Million Colors in Your Mind, revealing ever more tantalizing musical layers".

In JazzTimes, Mike Joyce stated: "There’s nothing quite like the sound of pianist Cyrus Chestnut hammering his way through a five chord in a climactic turnaround, as if to underscore his abiding affection for blues and gospel traditions. It evokes images of a smiling slugger rounding third and heading home, having just deposited a ball somewhere in the upper deck. You’ll find examples of that on A Million Colors in Your Mind, but as its title suggests, his latest recording is a many-hued thing".

== Track listing ==
1. "I've Never Been in Love Before" (Frank Loesser) – 5:43
2. "Gloria's Step" (Scott LaFaro) – 4:21
3. "Hello" (Lionel Richie) – 6:06
4. "From a Tip" (Victor Lewis) – 5:54
5. "Day Dream" (Duke Ellington, Billy Strayhorn) – 3:38
6. "Brotherhood of Man" (Loesser) – 6:26
7. "Yemenja" (John Hicks) – 4:13
8. "A Time for Love" (Johnny Mandel, Paul Francis Webster) – 8:26
9. "Polka Dots and Moonbeams" (Jimmy Van Heusen, Johnny Burke) – 4:51
10. "I Didn't Know What Time It Was" (Richard Rodgers, Lorenz Hart) – 7:05

== Personnel ==
- Cyrus Chestnut – piano
- David Williams - bass
- Victor Lewis – drums
