= The Real Quiet Storm =

Studio album by James Carter
- Released: March 10, 1995
- Recorded: October 6 & 7 and November 20, 1994
- Studio: Power Station, New York City
- Genre: Jazz
- Length: 58:26
- Label: Atlantic; 7567-82742-2
- Producer: Yves Beauvais

James Carter chronology
Jurassic Classics (1995)	The Real Quiet Storm (1995)	Conversin' with the Elders (1995)

The Real Quiet Storm is the third studio album by saxophonist James Carter, the first to be released on the Atlantic label. It was recorded in October and November 1994 and released on March 10, 1995.

== Reception ==
Professional ratings
Review scores
Source	Rating
AllMusic	3/5 stars
Robert Christgau	A
The Penguin Guide to Jazz Recordings	4/4 stars
The Rolling Stone Album Guide	5/5 stars

The AllMusic review by Scott Yanow stated: "Despite this CD's title and a slight emphasis on ballads, The Real Quiet Storm is not an easy listening record... The results are a bit restrained compared to his live performances, but this is an enjoyable and unpredictable outing, music that will not be played on the Quiet Storm". Critic Robert Christgau rated the album an "A", saying, "This romantic set has some concept. Two unfazed Carter originals complement a surprising selection of make-out music by Monk, Ellington, Sun Ra, Bill Doggett, Carter's main man Don Byas. Not only is it more unified, it's more pop, which intensifies the aesthetic charge".

== Track listing ==
1. "'Round Midnight" (Thelonious Monk) - 6:04
2. "You Never Told Me That You Care" (Hobart Dotson, Sun Ra) - 6:38
3. "The Intimacy of My Woman's Beautiful Eyes" (James Carter) - 8:46
4. "1944 Stomp" (Don Byas) - 4:53
5. "The Stevedore's Serenade" (Duke Ellington, Irving Gordon) - 9:02
6. "Born to Be Blue" (Mel Tormé, Robert Wells) - 7:45
7. "Deep Throat Blues" (Carter) - 6:05
8. "A Ballad for a Doll" (Jackie McLean) - 5:05
9. "Eventide" (Bill Doggett) - 4:08

== Personnel ==
- James Carter - tenor saxophone, alto saxophone, baritone saxophone, soprano saxophone, bass flute, bass clarinet
- Craig Taborn - piano (tracks 1–8)
- Dave Holland (tracks 2, 3, 7 & 8), Jaribu Shahid (tracks 4–6 & 9) - bass
- Leon Parker (tracks 2, 3 & 7), Tani Tabbal (tracks 4–6) - drums
