= Conversin' with the Elders =

Studio album by James Carter
- Released: June 4, 1996
- Recorded: October 2, 1995, January 30 & February 5, 1996
- Studio: Power Station, New York City
- Genre: Jazz
- Length: 62:20
- Label: Atlantic; 7567-82908-2
- Producer: Yves Beauvais

James Carter chronology
The Real Quiet Storm (1995)	Conversin' with the Elders (1996)	In Carterian Fashion (1998)

Conversin' with the Elders is the fourth album by saxophonist James Carter recorded in late 1995 and early 1996 and released on the Atlantic label. The album features guest appearances by veteran musicians, including trumpeters Harry "Sweets" Edison and Lester Bowie, and saxophonists Hamiet Bluiett, Larry Smith and Buddy Tate.

== Reception ==
Professional ratings
Review scores
Source	Rating
AllMusic	3.5/5 stars
Robert Christgau	A
The Penguin Guide to Jazz Recordings	4/4 stars
The Rolling Stone Album Guide	5/5 stars

AllMusic awarded the album 3½ stars with its review by Scott Yanow stating, "Switching between tenor, alto, baritone and bass clarinet, Carter makes each of his guests feel at home while pushing them to stretch themselves. A consistently colorful and generally swing-oriented set". Critic Robert Christgau rated the album an "A" saying, "A jazz album, absolutely. But one any rock and roller who can abide a saxophone could love".

== Track listing ==
1. "Freereggaehibop" (Lester Bowie) - 8:10
2. "Parker's Mood" (Charlie Parker) - 6:29
3. "Lester Leaps In" (Lester Young) - 4:57
4. "Naima" (John Coltrane) - 7:09
5. "Blue Creek" (Buddy Tate) - 6:13
6. "Centrepiece" (Harry "Sweets" Edison, John Handy) - 6:35
7. "Composition #40Q" (Anthony Braxton) - 6:41
8. "Moten Swing" (Bennie Moten, Buster Moten) - 7:44
9. "Atitled Valse" (James Carter) - 8:22
- Recorded at Power Station, NYC on October 2, 1995 (tracks 1 & 9), January 30, 1996 (tracks 3, 5, 6 & 8) and February 5, 1996 (tracks 2, 4 & 7)

== Personnel ==
- James Carter - tenor saxophone, alto saxophone, baritone saxophone, bass clarinet
- Craig Taborn - piano
- Jaribu Shahid - bass
- Tani Tabbal - drums
- Lester Bowie (tracks 1 & 9), Harry "Sweets" Edison (tracks 3 & 6) - trumpet
- Larry Smith - alto saxophone (track 2)
- Buddy Tate - tenor saxophone, clarinet (tracks 5 & 8)
- Hamiet Bluiett - baritone saxophone (tracks 4 & 7)
