= Gold Sounds =

Studio album by James Carter, Cyrus Chestnut, Ali Jackson, Reginald Veal
- Released: September 27, 2005
- Recorded: September 16–19, 2004 by Steven Mandel
- Studio: Electric Lady, NYC
- Genre: Jazz
- Length: 44:18
- Label: Brown Brothers; BBR-CD1
- Producer: DM Elkins and Jake Cohn

James Carter chronology
Out of Nowhere (2005)	Gold Sounds (2005)	Present Tense (2008)

Gold Sounds is an album by saxophonist James Carter, keyboardist Cyrus Chestnut, drummer Ali Jackson and bassist Reginald Veal performing compositions by the indie rock band Pavement and released on the Brown Brothers label in 2005.

== Reception ==
Professional ratings
Review scores
Source	Rating
All About Jazz	4.5/5 stars
AllMusic	4/5 stars
The Penguin Guide to Jazz Recordings	3/4 stars

The AllMusic review by Sean Westergaard commented: "Gold Sounds is an overwhelming success, not just as a tribute but as a jazz album ... If you're a Pavement fan, you owe it to yourself to check out what these guys do with the songbook. If you're a jazz fan, forget that these tunes come from the world of indie rock; in the hands of Carter and Chestnut, they might as well be undiscovered standards". On All About Jazz, Michael McCaw observed: "Gold Sounds doesn't give you everything the first time around. Like Pavement's recordings, what may seem complete is only a portion of the melody and musical ideas to which you ultimately want to return, because each time they hook you in a different way. In the end, the album provides a meaty dose of jazz that is as infectious as the pop from which it is derived". In JazzTimes, Brent Burton was less enthusiastic, writing: "a big hunk of the covers disc is, simply put, rather anonymous sounding, which leaves listeners with the quartet's somewhat cheesy conception of what it means to—gulp—rock".

== Track listing ==
All compositions by Stephen Malkmus.

1. "Stereo" – 6:24
2. "My First Mine" – 6:30
3. "Cut Your Hair" – 6:30
4. "Summer Babe" – 4:36
5. "Blue Hawaiian" – 4:54
6. "Here" – 5:52
7. "Platform Blues" – 5:38
8. "Trigger Cut" – 3:54

== Personnel ==
- James Carter – tenor saxophone soprano saxophone, contrabass sarrusophone
- Cyrus Chestnut – piano, electric piano, organ
- Reginald Veal – bass, electric bass, vocals
- Ali Jackson – drums, vocals
