= In Carterian Fashion =

Studio album by James Carter
- Released: May 19, 1998
- Recorded: 1998
- Studio: Power Station, New York City
- Genre: Jazz
- Length: 58:26
- Label: Atlantic; 83082-2
- Producer: Yves Beauvais

James Carter chronology
Conversin' with the Elders (1996)	In Carterian Fashion (1998)	Chasin' the Gypsy (2000)

In Carterian Fashion is the 6th album led by saxophonist James Carter, recorded in 1998 and released on the Atlantic label.

== Reception ==
Professional ratings
Review scores
Source	Rating
AllMusic	3.5/5 stars
Robert Christgau	A−
The Penguin Guide to Jazz Recordings	3.5/4 stars
The Rolling Stone Album Guide	4/5 stars

The AllMusic review by Scott Yanow called Carter "a remarkable virtuoso who can seemingly do anything he wants on his horns. It is just a matter of passing time and accomplishments accumulating before Carter is thought of as one of the all-time greats... the dominant voice throughout is James Carter's, who in general is a little more restrained, which makes his fiery explosions and colorful tonal distortions really stand out. Recommended". All About Jazz noted, "The album concept for James Carter's fifth release as leader is the familiar organ combo sound with earthy tenor saxophone. The concept works for the 29-year-old saxophonist, who still manages to retain the other elements with which his career has been associated: overt physical avant-garde taunts, swingin' Kansas City rambles, and polite mainstream lyricism"". Critic Robert Christgau rated the album an "A−", saying, "Just by blowing so lustily and swinging so edgily, Carter puts out more personality and pleasure than all but a few musical word-slingers".

== Track listing ==
All compositions by James Carter except where noted.

1. "Lianmo" (Cassius Richmond) - 4:55
2. "Down to the River" (Traditional) - 4:04
3. "Don's Idea" (Don Byas) - 5:11
4. "Skull Grabbin'" - 6:36
5. "Odyssey" (Kenneth Green) - 8:00
6. "Trouble in the World" (Traditional) - 6:49
7. "Escape from Bizarro World" (Spencer Barefield) - 6:03
8. "Frisco Follies" - 6:43
9. "Lockjaw's Lament" - 7:29
10. "In Carterian Fashion" - 6:29

== Personnel ==
- James Carter - tenor saxophone, soprano saxophone, baritone saxophone, bass clarinet
- Dwight Adams - trumpet (tracks 1, 3, 5, 7 & 10)
- Cassius Richmond - alto saxophone (tracks 1, 5 & 7)
- Cyrus Chestnut (tracks 8 & 9), Henry Butler (tracks 2, 5 & 6), Craig Taborn (tracks 1, 3, 4, 7 & 10) - organ
- Kevin Carter - guitar (tracks 2, 6 & 10)
- Steve Kirby (tracks 8 & 9), Jaribu Shahid (tracks 1, 3, 4, 7 & 10) - bass
- Alvester Garnett (tracks 8 & 9), Leonard King (tracks 2, 5 & 6), Tani Tabbal (tracks 1, 3, 4, 7 & 10) - drums
