= Jurassic Classics =

Studio album by James Carter
- Released: 1994
- Recorded: April 16 & 17 1994
- Studio: Power Station, New York City
- Genre: Jazz
- Length: 57:12
- Label: DIW; DIW 886
- Producer: Kazunori Sugiyama

James Carter chronology
JC on the Set (1994)	Jurassic Classics (1994)	The Real Quiet Storm (1995)

Jurassic Classics is the second album by the American saxophonist James Carter, recorded and released in 1994 on the Japanese DIW label. It wasn’t released in the United States until 1995.

== Critical reception ==
Professional ratings
Review scores
Source	Rating
AllMusic	4.5/5 stars
Los Angeles Times	3/4 stars
The Penguin Guide to Jazz Recordings	3/4 stars
The Rolling Stone Album Guide	4/5 stars

The New York Times wrote: "If [Carter] has a weakness, it is a hyperactive quality that keeps any mood from gelling; he seems to be almost too aware of his options at any given moment, and it paradoxically causes almost everything to end up eventually on the same exhausting emotional pitch." The Los Angeles Times called the album "a raging firestorm of activity, an album that both challenges and identifies him with his saxophone predecessors."

The AllMusic review by Scott Yanow stated: "Among the most versatile and knowledgeable of today's saxophonists, Carter draws on many top stylists during these lengthy solos, yet always sounds quite individual ... A very stimulating session."

== Track listing ==
1. "Take the "A" Train" (Billy Strayhorn) - 11:03
2. "Out of Nowhere" (Johnny Green, Edward Heyman) - 4:29
3. "Epistrophy" (Kenny Clarke, Thelonious Monk) - 13:45
4. "Ask Me Now" (Monk) - 7:11
5. "Equinox" (John Coltrane) - 8:40
6. "Sandu" (Clifford Brown) - 7:34
7. "Oleo" (Sonny Rollins) - 4:30

== Personnel ==
- James Carter - baritone, tenor, alto & soprano saxophones
- Craig Taborn - piano
- Jaribu Shahid - bass
- Tani Tabbal - drums
