= Layin' in the Cut (James Carter album) =

Studio album by James Carter
- Released: May 26, 2000
- Recorded: 2000
- Studio: Magic Shop, New York City
- Genre: Jazz
- Length: 47:38
- Label: Atlantic; 7567-83305-2
- Producer: Yves Beauvais

James Carter chronology
Chasin' the Gypsy (2000)	Layin' in the Cut (2000)	Gardenias for Lady Day (2003)

Layin' in the Cut is the seventh album by American saxophonist James Carter, released on the Atlantic label in 2000. Devoted to free funk in the style of Ornette Coleman's late 1970s and '80s bands, it was one of two Carter albums released on the same day. The other was Chasin' the Gypsy, a tribute to guitarist Django Reinhardt.

== Reception ==
Professional ratings
Review scores
Source	Rating
AllMusic	3/5 stars
Robert Christgau	A
The Penguin Guide to Jazz Recordings	3/4 stars
The Rolling Stone Album Guide	4/5 stars

The AllMusic review by Richard S. Ginell says, "The second of James Carter's pair of 2000 releases shifts wildly, and perhaps trendily, toward electric funk ... Carter is a freewheeling dynamo on soprano and tenor saxes, not afraid to reach wildly to the outside even when the funk backgrounds are merely mild mannered." In JazzTimes Bill Milkowski wrote, "Carter's Layin' in the Cut is more about bluster than nuance ... he explores the outer fringes of funk with some freestyle originals that combine elements of Maceo Parker ("Layin' in the Cut") and Fela Kuti ("Motown Mash"), with healthy doses of tenor and bari overblowing and the kind of savage, aggressively out guitar work usually associated with New York's renegade downtown scene". On All About Jazz Mark Corroto noted, "Layin’ doesn’t opt to cross boundaries as much as it plays itself out as a jazz/funk bar band ... The powerful all-electric lineup matches up nicely with Carter’s huge sound. In contract to Chasin’ there's nothing implied about the groove here. The funk is up front." The critic Robert Christgau rated the album an "A", writing, "[It] is just a way for him to make another record without his touring band, write heads while nobody's looking, pay respects to a strain straighter coreligionists disdain, and prove he can rock a little, quite possibly while finishing the crossword. Not that there's anything distracted or desultory about this funk, this blues, this Latin, this harmolodic fusion, this free jazz. But he sure does make them seem second nature."

== Track listing ==
All compositions by James Carter except where noted.

1. "Layin' in the Cut" (James Carter, Jef Lee Johnson, Marc Ribot, G. Calvin Weston, Jamaaladeen Tacuma) - 6:57
2. "Motown Mash" (James Carter, Jef Lee Johnson, Marc Ribot, G. Calvin Weston, Jamaaladeen Tacuma) - 7:23
3. "Requiem for Hartford Ave." (James Carter, Jef Lee Johnson, Marc Ribot, G. Calvin Weston, Jamaaladeen Tacuma) - 5:58
4. "Terminal B" (Jef Lee Johnson) - 6:44
5. "Drafedelic in D♭" (James Carter, Jef Lee Johnson, Marc Ribot, G. Calvin Weston, Jamaaladeen Tacuma) - 5:49
6. "There's a Paddle" - 7:30
7. "GP" - 7:17

== Personnel ==
- James Carter - saxophones
- Jef Lee Johnson, Marc Ribot - electric guitar
- Jamaaladeen Tacuma - electric bass
- G. Calvin Weston - drums
