= Something for Grace =

Studio album by Regina Carter
- Released: 1997
- Genre: Jazz
- Label: Atlantic Jazz

Regina Carter chronology
Regina Carter (1995)	Something for Grace (1997)	Rhythms of the Heart (1999)

Something for Grace is an album by the American violinist Regina Carter, released in 1997. It is dedicated to her mother. Carter supported the album by playing the Newport Jazz Festival.

== Production ==
The album was produced by Arif Mardin and Carter, among others. "I'll Write a Song for You" is a cover of the Earth, Wind & Fire song. "Listen Here" is a cover of the Eddie Harris song; it was a hit on jazz radio stations.

== Critical reception ==
Professional ratings
Review scores
Source	Rating
AllMusic	3/5 stars
The Encyclopedia of Popular Music	3/5 stars
MusicHound Jazz: The Essential Album Guide	4/5 stars

JazzTimes wrote: "Carter's 'voice' is sometimes overwhelmed by urban/R&B trappings like the programmed snap-and-slap coldness of 'Late Night Mood' and the too-slick soup 'Hide & Seek'—but there are enough captivating highlights here to keep things interesting." The Washington Post noted that, "with both her pen and bow, Carter is able to imbue her music with rhythmic spirit and an all-embracing spirituality, as the album's title track makes clear."

The Virginian-Pilot called the album a "smorgasbord of radio-friendly jazz—from the melodic to the improvisational." The Omaha World-Herald dismissed it as "mere funky fusion."

AllMusic wrote that "Carter's haunting ballad 'Reflections' deserves to become a standard."

== Track listing ==
No.	Title	Length
1.	"Downtown Underground"
2.	"Listen Here"
3.	"Day Dreamin' on the Niger"
4.	"Reflections"
5.	"Something for Grace"
6.	"Soul Eyes"
7.	"Late Night Mood"
8.	"I'll Write a Song for You"
9.	"Hide & Seek (Bahjee Bahjee)"
10.	"Centro Habana"
