= Out of Nowhere (James Carter album) =

Live album by James Carter Organ Trio
- Released: June 28, 2005
- Recorded: May 6 & 7, 2004
- Venue: Blue Note, New York City
- Genre: Jazz
- Length: 71:16
- Label: Half Note; HN 4520
- Producer: Jeff Levenson

James Carter chronology
Live at Baker's Keyboard Lounge (2004)	Out of Nowhere (2005)	Gold Sounds (2006)

Out of Nowhere is a live album by saxophonist James Carter's Organ Trio with guests James Blood Ulmer and Hamiet Bluiett recorded at the Blue Note Jazz Club, and released on the Half Note Records label in 2005.

== Reception ==
Professional ratings
Review scores
Source	Rating
Allmusic	4.5/5 stars
All About Jazz	4/5 stars
Robert Christgau	A−
The Penguin Guide to Jazz Recordings	3/4 stars

The Allmusic review by Al Campbell says, " Like its predecessor, Live at Baker's Keyboard Lounge, Out of Nowhere provides an admirable cornucopia of modern jazz from Carter and friends". In JazzTimes David R. Adler called the album "another spirited live session". On All About Jazz John Kelman noted, "This recording's sense of adventure and avoidance of the expected makes for an entertaining and eye-opening experience. For those who wonder where Carter's been, the answer is right here. And for those who don't know him—or his illustrious associates—this is as painless an entry into their audacious world as you're apt to find". Critic Robert Christgau rated the album an "A−", saying, "the organ-trio format so derided in jazzbo land suits his vulgar gusto perfectly—it's made for showoffs and delights in the impolite sounds he can extract from any number of saxophones at will".

== Track listing ==
1. "Out of Nowhere" (Johnny Green, Edward Heyman) – 10:52
2. "Along Came Betty" (Benny Golson) – 14:33
3. "Highjack" (James Blood Ulmer) – 16:07
4. "Song for Camille" (Hamiet Bluiett) – 12:28
5. "Little Red Rooster" (Willie Dixon) – 4:51
6. "I Believe I Can Fly" (Robert Kelly) – 12:25

== Personnel ==
- James Carter – tenor saxophone soprano saxophone, baritone saxophone
- Gerard Gibbs – organ
- Leonard King – drums
- James Blood Ulmer – guitar, vocals (tracks 3–6)
- Hamiet Bluiett – baritone saxophone (tracks 3–6)
