= Pat Flowers (musician) =

American jazz musician

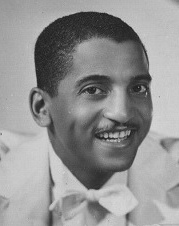
Pat Flowers c. 1943

Ivelee Patrick Flowers (October 16, 1917 – October 6, 2000) was an American jazz pianist and singer.

Born in Detroit, Flowers began his professional career as the pianist during intermissions at Uncle Tom's Cabin in the city when he was 18 years old. He moved to New York City in 1939, where he played private engagements and hotel lobbies; he worked in Philadelphia and then New York again, and recorded for the first time in 1941. After returning to Detroit, Flowers took up a residency at Baker's Keyboard Lounge, where he played intermittently into the middle of the 1950s.

From 1943 to 1948, Flowers was based out of New York again, where he initially collaborated frequently with Fats Waller at the Greenwich Village Inn. After Waller's death, Waller's manager Ed Kirkeby drafted Flowers as a possible successor for Waller, booking him for extended residencies at the Ruban Bleu and Café Society as well as radio appearances and recordings.Recorded sides for the Hit label in 1945 and for Victor ( Waller's old label) in 1946 and 1947. In 1945, he made three films, Scotch Boogie, Dixie Rhythm, and Coalmine Boogie.

Following his return to Detroit, Flowers became a mainstay of the local jazz scene. He had a residency at Farmington, Michigan's Danish Inn from 1974 to 1983. He toured Europe with a Fats Waller tribute show in 1975. At the end of his life he played the piano regularly at the Country Club of Detroit, Grosse Pointe Farms. He died in Detroit.

Flowers's early recordings were collected as I Ain't Got Nobody, released on Black & Blue Records in 1972.
