= There's a Sweet, Sweet Spirit =

There's a Sweet Sweet Spirit

Studio album by Cyrus Chestnut
- Released: July 14, 2017
- Recorded: February 27, 2017
- Studio: Systems Two Recording Studios, Brooklyn, NY
- Genre: Jazz
- Length: 59:56
- Label: HighNote; HCD 7304
- Producer: Cyrus Chestnut

Cyrus Chestnut chronology
Natural Essence (2016)	There's a Sweet Sweet Spirit (2017)	Kaleidoscope (2018)

There's a Sweet Sweet Spirit is an album by pianist Cyrus Chestnut. Recorded in 2017, it was released on the HighNote label the following year.

== Reception ==
Professional ratings
Review scores
Source	Rating
AllMusic	4/5 stars
The Observer	4/5 stars

The AllMusic review by Matt Collar stated: "An adept virtuoso talent, Chestnut soars alongside Williams and White on 2017's There's a Sweet Sweet Spirit ... While all of his albums are worth checking out, there is something inspired and kinetic about his playing with Williams and White, as if they are all three pushing each other to discover new avenues of expression ... Ultimately, if there's one overriding sentiment that drives all of There's a Sweet Sweet Spirit, it's Chestnut and his band's spirit of soulful camaraderie".

According to The Observer's reviewer, Dave Gelly: "It runs for exactly an hour, but there’s so much variety here, packed into what is essentially a piano trio album, that it seems over in half the time. There are jazz pieces by Monk, Miles Davis and others, an improvisation on a prelude by Chopin, a Stylistics soul classic, an original or two, and so on. And they all flow together quite naturally under the mellow influence of Cyrus Chestnut’s piano".

== Track listing ==
1. "The Littlest One of All" (Bobby Hutcherson) – 4:20
2. "Chopin Prelude" (Frédéric Chopin) – 6:53
3. "Nardis" (Miles Davis) – 7:33
4. "Little B's Poem" (Hutcherson) – 4:50
5. "Christina" (Buster Williams) – 4:51
6. "CDC" (Cyrus Chestnut) – 6:23
7. "You Make Me Feel Brand New" (Thom Bell, Linda Creed) – 6:07
8. "Easy Living" (Ralph Rainger, Leo Robin) – 8:32
9. "Rhythm-a-Ning" (Thelonious Monk) – 4:51
10. "There's a Sweet, Sweet Spirit" (Doris Akers) – 5:36

== Personnel ==
- Cyrus Chestnut – piano
- Buster Williams – bass (tracks 1–4 & 6–9)
- Lenny White – drums (tracks 1–4 & 6–9)
- Steve Nelson – vibraphone (tracks 1, 4 & 8)
- Charlotte Small, Djoré Nance, Keesha Gumbs – vocals (track 7)
