= Gardenias for Lady Day =

Studio album by James Carter
- Released: 2003
- Recorded: 2003
- Studio: Avatar (New York, New York)
- Genre: Jazz
- Length: 46:09
- Label: Columbia; CH 89032
- Producer: Yves Beauvais

James Carter chronology
Layin' in the Cut (2000)	Gardenias for Lady Day (2003)	Live at Baker's Keyboard Lounge (2000)

Gardenias for Lady Day is the eighth album by saxophonist James Carter featuring tracks associated with Billie Holiday which was released on the Columbia label in 2003.

== Reception ==
Professional ratings
Review scores
Source	Rating
Allmusic	4.5/5 stars
The Penguin Guide to Jazz Recordings	3/4 stars
The Village Voice	B−
The Rolling Stone Album Guide	3.5/5 stars

The Allmusic review by Matt Collar says, "This is a beautiful album that revels as much in classic melody as it does in Carter's most torrid saxophone "skronk." ... Continuing to display a unique and singular vision, Carter has crafted a fittingly urbane, elegant, and unnerving album that celebrates both Holiday's haunting spirituality and earthy sexuality". In JazzTimes Nate Chinen wrote, "Painstakingly but not excessively produced, it has enormous commercial potential-yet never panders or beseeches. The disc satisfies Carter's aptitude for repertory, his gift for personal interpretation, his saxophone obsession, his historical ken and even his devotion to the art of surprise. In doing so, it presents a musical vision of laserlike focus, suggesting a new threshold of maturity for Carter, whose talents and insights have always been well ahead of his years". On All About Jazz Jim Santella noted, "Carter's tribute to the memory of Billie Holiday weaves lyrical melodies around his own trademark enthusiasm. His desire to build upon what our jazz ancestors laid down for us has matured. Instead of far-out creations that few could understand and that many would bicker with, the 34-year-old saxophone sensation serves up an accessible program that reaches, nevertheless, into the 21st century. Stereo saxophones and deep-throated clarinets surround themes that recall the uniqueness of Lady Day. Her deep, inner strengths, her don’t-quit attitude, and her remarkable perseverance all show up in the musical arrangements that James Carter has adopted for his debut on Columbia".

Tom Hull was less receptive in his July 2004 "Jazz Consumer Guide" for The Village Voice. Naming the album "Dud of the Month", he suggested that Columbia executives had steered Carter toward recording a "mess" and wrote in conclusion: "Eight songs, only half even vaguely associated with Holiday; strings that would gag Charlie Parker; excited vocals by an Ella wannabe. Only when the quartet plays unencumbered do you get an idea of how much talent is wasted here."

== Track listing ==
1. "Gloria" (Don Byas) – 6:01
2. "Sunset" (Buster Harding, Cab Calloway) – 5:24
3. "(I Wonder) Where Our Love Has Gone" (Buddy Johnson) – 6:22
4. "I'm in a Low Down Groove" (Roy Jacobs) – 4:39
5. "Strange Fruit" (Lewis Allan) – 4:20
6. "A Flower Is a Lovesome Thing" (Billy Strayhorn) – 5:54
7. "Indian Summer" (Victor Herbert, Al Dubin) – 6:52
8. "More Than You Know" (Vincent Youmans, Edward Eliscu, Billy Rose) – 6:37
9. "Lil' Hat's Odyssey" (James Carter) – 5:55 Bonus track on CD
10. "You're a Lucky Guy" (Saul Chaplin, Sammy Cahn) – 7:59 Bonus track on CD

== Personnel ==
- James Carter – baritone saxophone, tenor saxophone, mezzo-soprano saxophone, soprano saxophone, contrabass clarinet, bass clarinet, arranger
- John Hicks – piano
- Peter Washington – bass
- Victor Lewis – drums
- Sandy Park – concertmaster, violin
- Sharon Yamada, Lisa Kim, Myung Hi Kim, Ann Kim, Sarah Kim – violin
- Robert Rinehart, Tom Rosenthal – viola
- Elizabeth Dyson, Sarah Seiver, Bruce Wang, Mina Smith, Jeanne LeBlanc, Eileen Moon – cello
- Erik Charlston – vibraphone, wind machine
- Erik Ralske, Phil Myers – French horn
- Jeff Nelson – bass trombone
- Miche Braden – vocals (tracks 5 & 8)
- Greg Cohen (tracks 5–9), Cassius Richmond (tracks 1–4) – arranger
