= Kaleidoscope (Cyrus Chestnut album) =

Studio album by Cyrus Chestnut
- Released: August 31, 2018
- Recorded: April 29, 2018
- Studio: Sear Sound Studio C, New York City
- Genre: Jazz
- Length: 66:47
- Label: HighNote; HCD 7317
- Producer: Cyrus Chestnut

Cyrus Chestnut chronology
| There's a Sweet, Sweet Spirit (2017) | Kaleidoscope (2018) | My Father's Hands (2022) |

Kaleidoscope is an album by pianist Cyrus Chestnut that was recorded in 2018 and released on the HighNote label the following year.

== Reception ==
Professional ratings
Review scores
| Source | Rating |
|---|---|
| AllMusic | 4/5 stars |

The AllMusic review by Matt Collar said: "Pianist Cyrus Chestnut is a virtuoso player with deep roots in both spiritual gospel music and harmonically sophisticated jazz. That said, he's also a classically trained artist with a wide-ranging and eclectic taste in music. He brings all of these influences to bear on his nuanced and enveloping 2018 trio date, Kaleidoscope ... Here, Chestnut has chosen a handful of his favorite classical compositions, including tracks by Erik Satie, Claude Debussy, and Maurice Ravel, which he reworks in his own inimitable jazz style, alongside other standards and his own originals. What's particularly compelling about his choices is just how well the classical songs fit into the jazz trio concept".

In JazzTimes, David Whiteis stated: "This is serious play at its most elegant and satisfying. Cyrus Chestnut takes on fare ranging from original compositions through the works of Mozart, Ravel, and Satie, along with a hymn, a classic from the Great American Songbook, and most audaciously, a scrap from the heavy metal slag heap, enriching it all with zest, good humor, and unflagging craftsmanship. Chestnut is that rare artist whose work is as welcoming, even reassuring, as it is bold".

== Track listing ==
1. "Golliwog's Cakewalk" (Claude Debussy) – 5:06
2. "Darn That Dream" (Jimmy Van Heusen, Eddie DeLange) – 5:09
3. "Gymnopedie No. 1" (Erik Satie) – 6:19
4. "Entre Cloches" (Maurice Ravel) – 5:48
5. "Jimbo's Lullaby" (Debussy) – 5:30
6. "Father Time" (Cyrus Chestnut) – 5:33
7. "Lord, I Want to Be a Christian" (Traditional) – 4:31
8. "Son Binocle" (Satie) – 4:09
9. "Smoke on the Water" (Ritchie Blackmore, Ian Gillan, Roger Glover, Jon Lord, Ian Paice) – 4:38
10. "Gnossienne No. 1" (Satie) – 7:00
11. "Gymnopedie No. 3" (Satie) – 4:11
12. "Turkish Rondo" (Wolfgang Amadeus Mozart) – 3:41
13. "Prayer for Claudine" (Chestnut) – 5:12

== Personnel ==
- Cyrus Chestnut – piano
- Eric Wheeler - bass
- Chris Beck – drums
