= Live at Baker's Keyboard Lounge =

Live album by James Carter Organ Trio
- Released: April 6, 2004
- Recorded: June 16–18, 2001
- Venue: Baker's Keyboard Lounge, Detroit, MI
- Genre: Jazz
- Length: 78:41
- Label: Warner Bros. 9362 48449-2
- Producer: Ahmet Ertegun, James Carter

James Carter chronology
Gardenias for Lady Day (2003)	Live at Baker's Keyboard Lounge (2004)	Out of Nowhere (2005)

Live at Baker's Keyboard Lounge is a live album by saxophonist James Carter with guests David Murray, Johnny Griffin and Franz Jackson recorded at Baker's Keyboard Lounge in 2001, and released on the Warner Bros. label in 2004.

== Reception ==
Professional ratings
Review scores
Source	Rating
Allmusic	4.5/5 stars
The Penguin Guide to Jazz Recordings	3/4 stars
The Village Voice	A−
The Rolling Stone Album Guide	4/5 stars

Reviewing for The Village Voice in July 2004, Tom Hull said that "this isn't a great album, but it's voluble and exciting the way Carter can be."

The Allmusic review by Al Campbell says, "Live at Baker's Keyboard Lounge finds Carter cutting loose like a musician who's been conceptually sidetracked long enough. This is a back to basics blowing session and concepts be damned". In JazzTimes Chris Kelsey called the album "a rollicking session that captures the loose vibe of a nightclub set to near perfection". On All About Jazz Russ Musto noted, "James Carter is a passionate player whose solos are frequently pushed over the top by his awesome virtuosity. That tendency is put to good use on this live extravaganza recorded before a raucous crowd at Baker's Keyboard Lounge. ... Carter moves effortlessly through his arsenal of saxophones on an exciting program of jazz classics".

== Track listing ==
1. "Tricotism" (Oscar Pettiford) – 9:23
2. "Soul Street" (Jimmy Forrest) – 8:17
3. "Freedom Jazz Dance" (Eddie Harris) – 9:26
4. "I Can't Get Started" (Vernon Duke, Ira Gershwin) – 7:10
5. "Free and Easy" (Don Byas) – 10:39
6. "Low Flame" (Leonard Feather) – 10:21
7. "Sack Full of Dreams" (Gary McFarland) – 12:00
8. "Foot Pattin'" (George Duvivier) – 11:29

== Personnel ==
- James Carter – tenor saxophone, soprano saxophone, baritone saxophone
- Gerard Gibbs – organ
- Leonard King – drums
- David Murray, Johnny Griffin – tenor saxophone
- Franz Jackson – tenor saxophone, vocals
- Larry Smith – alto saxophone
- Dwight Adams – trumpet
- Kenny Cox – piano
- Ralphe Armstrong – bass
- Richard "Pistol" Allen – drums
