= At the Crossroads (album) =

Studio album by James Carter Organ Trio
- Released: October 4, 2011
- Recorded: February 8 & 9, 2011
- Studio: Avatar (New York, New York)
- Genre: Jazz
- Length: 74:44
- Label: EmArcy
- Producer: Michael Cuscuna

James Carter chronology
Caribbean Rhapsody (2011)	At the Crossroads (2011)

At the Crossroads is an album by saxophonist James Carter's Organ Trio, released on the EmArcy label in 2011.

== Reception ==
Professional ratings
Review scores
Source	Rating
All About Jazz	5/5 stars
AllMusic	4/5 stars
The Guardian	3/5 stars

The AllMusic review by Thom Jurek commented: "At the Crossroads delivers what its title promises: a portrait of the Organ Trio at the point where they look back at B-3 jazz history and move it ever forward". In JazzTimes, Steve Greenlee said: "Carter's tone—alternately gruff and sensuous, always balancing melody and skronk—of course gets the limelight. His is, after all, one of today's most unmistakable saxophone voices, and he knows it". For All About Jazz, C. Michael Bailey observed: "Carter takes advantage of the music, exploring all of its facets in his exceptional organ trio format. No stone is left unturned, no influence unaknowledged". The Guardian' critic John Fordham wrote: "Carter can be sumptuously romantic or exhilaratingly funky – his technique embraces all kinds of extreme playing, from split-note multiphonic harmonies to staccato effects – and he directs his full firepower at this mostly mainstream-groovy repertoire".

== Track listing ==
1. "Oh Gee" (Matthew Gee) – 6:49
2. "JC Off the Set" (Gerard Gibbs) – 3:19
3. "Aged Pain" (Ronald Shannon Jackson) – 5:26
4. "The Walkin' Blues" (Jesse Powell, Ralph Bass) – 5:21
5. "My Whole Life Through" (Eddie Durham, Sarah McLawler) – 7:04
6. "Walking the Dog" (Jack McDuff) – 7:23
7. "Lettuce Toss Yo' Salad" (Leonard King Jr.) – 7:00
8. "Misterio" (Guido Luciani) – 5:09
9. "Ramblin' Blues" (Fred Mendelsohn, Maybelle Smith) – 4:19
10. "Come Sunday" (Duke Ellington) – 7:34
11. "Tis the Old Ship of Zion" (Traditional) – 5:21
12. "The Hard Blues" (Julius Hemphill) – 9:52

== Personnel ==
- James Carter – soprano saxophone, alto saxophone, tenor saxophone, baritone saxophone
- Gerard Gibbs – organ
- Leonard King Jr. – drums, vocals
- Bruce Edwards (tracks 1, 3 & 6), Brandon Ross (tracks 4 & 12) – guitar
- Miche Braden – vocals (tracks 4 & 11)
- Keyon Harrold – trumpet (tracks 4 & 10)
- Vincent Chandler – trombone (tracks 4 & 10)
- Eli Fountain – tambourine (track 10)
