= Charli XCX: Alone Together =

2021 documentary film

Charli XCX: Alone Together is 2021 documentary film that follows the creation of Charli XCX's fourth studio album, How I'm Feeling Now, during the 40-day COVID-19 pandemic lockdown in 2020.
