= Regina Carter =

American jazz violinist (born 1966)

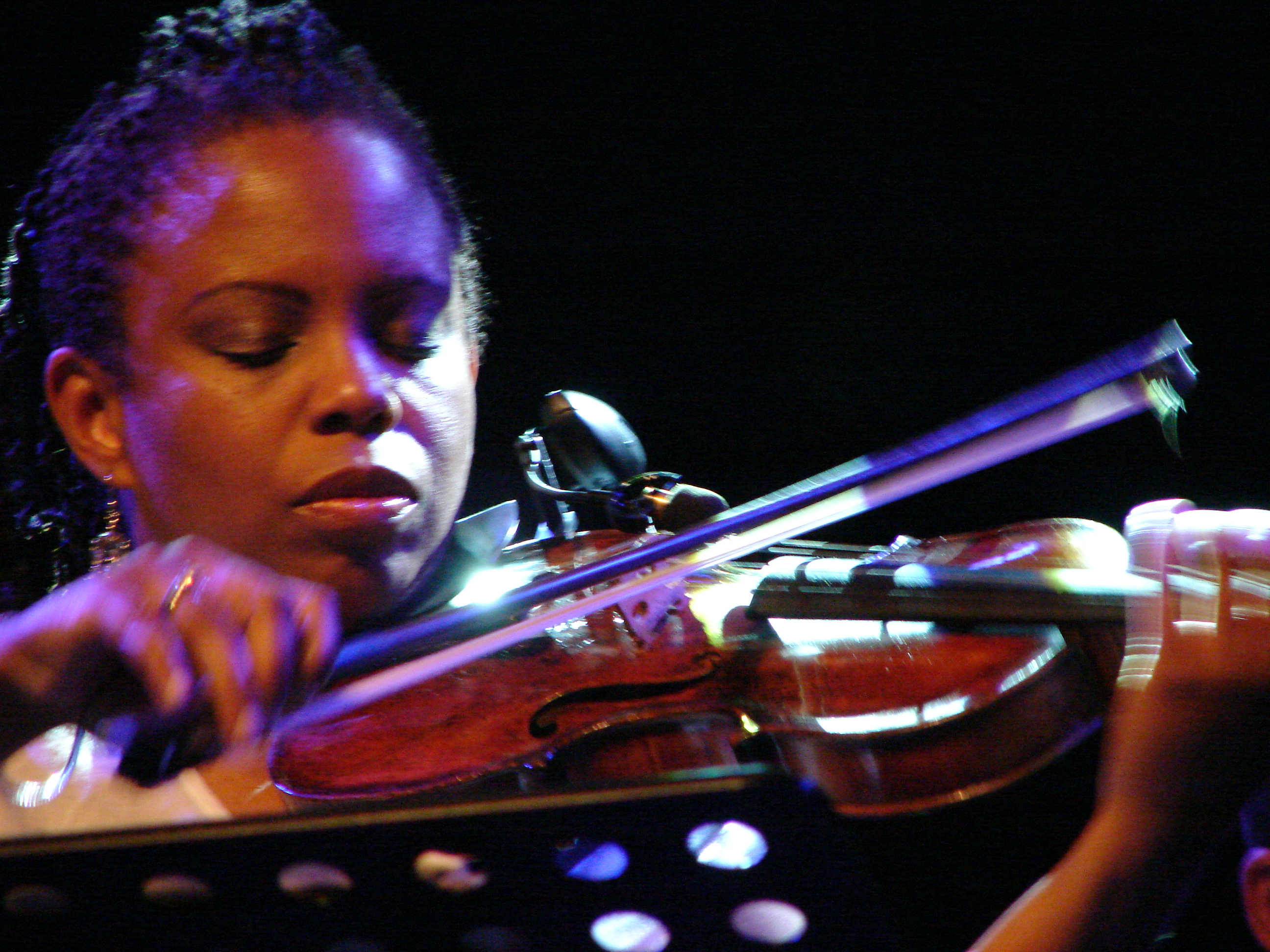
- Carter in 2006

Background information
- Born: August 6, 1966 (age 60); Detroit, Michigan, U.S.
- Education: New England Conservatory of Music; Oakland University
- Genres: Jazz, classical
- Occupation: Musician
- Instrument: Violin
- Years active: 1978, 1987–present
- Labels: Atlantic, Verve
- Website: reginacarter.com

Regina Carter (born August 6, 1966) is an American jazz violinist. She is the cousin of jazz saxophonist James Carter.

== Early life ==
Carter was born in Detroit, Michigan, and was one of three children in her family.

She began piano lessons at the age of two, after playing a melody by ear for her brother's piano teacher. After she deliberately played the wrong ending note at a concert, the piano teacher suggested she take up the violin, indicating that the Suzuki Method could be more conducive to her creativity. Carter's mother enrolled her at the Detroit Community Music School when she was four years old and Carter began studying the violin. She still studied the piano, as well as tap and ballet.

As a teenager, she played in the youth division of the Detroit Symphony Orchestra. While at school, she was able to take master classes from Itzhak Perlman and Yehudi Menuhin.

Carter attended Cass Technical High School with a close friend, jazz singer Carla Cook, who introduced her to Ella Fitzgerald. In high school, Carter performed with the Detroit Civic Orchestra and played in a pop-funk group named Brainstorm. In addition to taking violin lessons, she also took viola, oboe, and choir lessons.

Carter was studying classical violin at the New England Conservatory of Music in Boston when she decided to switch to jazz. She transferred to Oakland University in Rochester, Michigan, where she was a jazz major under the direction of Marvin "Doc" Holladay. She also studied and performed with trumpeter Marcus Belgrave. Through Belgrave, Carter was able to meet musicians active in the Detroit jazz scene, including Lyman Woodard. She graduated in 1985. After graduating, she taught strings in Detroit public schools. Needing a change of scene, she moved to Europe and lived in Germany for two years. While making connections, she worked as a nanny for a German family and taught violin on a U.S. military base.

== Career ==
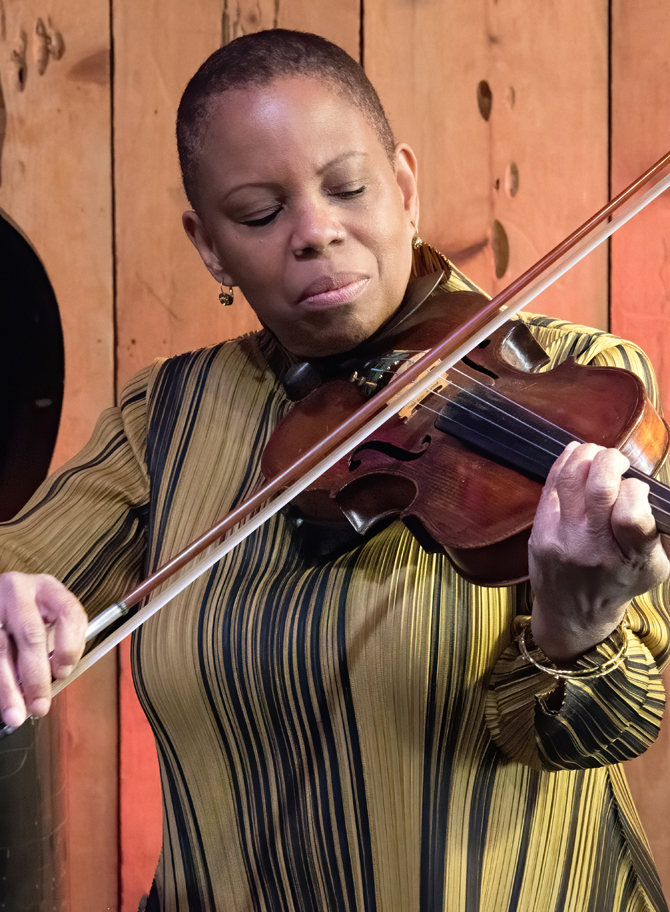
Carter at Bach Dancing & Dynamite Society, Half Moon Bay, CA, 3/1/20

Carter returned to the U.S. and first came into the spotlight as the violinist for the all-female pop-jazz quintet Straight Ahead in 1987, with Cynthia Dewberry, Gayelynn McKinney, Eileen Orr, and Marion Hayden. In the early to mid-1990s, Branford Marsalis was quoted as saying: "They truly swing." They released a trio of albums on the Atlantic Jazz label including their self-titled debut, Body and Soul, and Look Straight Ahead. Carter went solo before the release of their third album, Dance of the Forest Rain. In 1991, she left the band and moved to New York City.

While in New York, she was a relative unknown and undertook work accompanying performers such as Aretha Franklin, Lauryn Hill, Mary J. Blige, Billy Joel, and Dolly Parton. Carter also played with Max Roach and Oliver Lake, as well as being in the String Trio of New York. Carter worked on the albums Intermobility (1993), Octagon (1994), and Blues ... ? (1996) with the group.

While with the trio, she released her first solo CD, Regina Carter (1995). Dedicated to her mother, Something for Grace was released in 1997. Carter toured with Wynton Marsalis for the 1997 production Blood on the Fields. She then changed record companies from Atlantic Records to Verve Music Group, which allowed her more artistic freedom, and she released Rhythms of the Heart (1999). The album Motor City Moments, paying respect to her hometown, was released in 2000.

In December 2001, she played a concert in Genoa using Il Cannone Guarnerius, a violin that was made in 1743 and was once owned and favoured by Niccolò Paganini. The violin was bequeathed to Genoa after Paganini's death in 1840. The name of instrument is given because an "explosive" sound can be achieved. Carter was invited to play after the incidents of the September 11 attacks as a gesture of solidarity. She was both the first jazz musician and the first African American to play the instrument. She later recorded Paganini: After a Dream for Verve Records. The album featured classical works by Maurice Ravel and Claude Debussy, and Cinema Paradiso by Ennio Morricone.

I'll Be Seeing You: A Sentimental Journey, Carter's sixth CD, was conceived as a tribute album to her late mother, which included some of her favorites as well as American standards from the 1920s–1940s. Some songs include "Blue Rose" (Duke Ellington), "Sentimental Journey" (Les Brown), "A-Tisket, A-Tasket" (Ella Fitzgerald), as well as "I'll Be Seeing You".

Active as an educator, mentor, and proponent of the Suzuki method, Carter has given workshops and master classes at numerous institutions. She was Artist in Residence at her alma mater, Oakland University from 2007–2018. She has also taught at the jazz summer camp at Stanford Jazz Workshop. In 2018, she was named Artistic Director of the New Jersey Performing Arts All-Female Jazz Camp.

During the 2000s, Carter performed at the head of a quintet. In 2005, she performed on Eddie Palmieri's album Listen Here! which won a Grammy award for best Latin Jazz album. In May 2006, she toured with Darryl Harper (clarinet), Xavier Davis (piano), Alvester Garnett (drums) (still with her in 2011), and Matt Parish (Upright bass).

Carter was awarded a MacArthur Fellows Program grant, also known as a "genius grant", in September 2006. The award includes a grant of $500,000 over five years, and the committee stated this about Carter:

Regina Carter is a master of improvisational jazz violin. Though her work draws upon a wide range of musical influences – including Motown, Afro-Cuban, Swing, Bebop, Folk, and World – she has crafted a signature voice and style. ... Carter's performances highlight the often overlooked potential of the jazz violin for its lyric, melodic, and percussive potential. Her early training as a classical musician is reflected in the fluidity, grace, and balance of her performance. Carter's repertoire retains a firm connection with the familiar while venturing in new, unexpected directions. ... Through artistry with an instrument that has been defined predominantly by the classical tradition, Carter is pioneering new possibilities for the violin and for jazz.

In 2018, Carter was a recipient of the Doris Duke Award.

Carter married Alvester Garnett in Detroit, on September 5, 2004. Garnett is the drummer in her band. Carter has been a resident of Maywood, New Jersey.

== Discography ==
As leader or co-leader

- 1995: Regina Carter (Atlantic)
- 1997: Something for Grace (Atlantic)
- 1999: Rhythms of the Heart (Verve)
- 2000: Motor City Moments (Verve)
- 2001: Freefall (Verve), with Kenny Barron
- 2003: Paganini: After a Dream (Verve)
- 2006: I'll Be Seeing You: A Sentimental Journey (Verve)
- 2010: Reverse Thread (E1 Entertainment)
- 2014: Southern Comfort (Masterworks)
- 2017: Ella: Accentuate the Positive (Masterworks)

With Lyman Woodard

- Lyman Woodard Organization – Dedicacion (Corridor Records, 1985)

With the String Trio of New York

- Intermobility (Arabesque, 1992)
- Octagon (Black Saint, 1992)
- Blues...? (Black Saint, 1993)
- An Outside Job (AA, 1994)

With Kenny Barron

- Spirit Song (Verve, 1999)

With Anthony Davis

- Ellington / Monk / Mingus / Davis (Music & Arts, 1997)

With Mark Helias

- Loopin' the Cool (Enja, 1995)

With Elliott Sharp

- Xenocodex (Tzadik, 1996)

With Cassandra Wilson

- Traveling Miles (Blue Note, 1999) on two tracks

With Steve Turre

- Lotus Flower (Verve, 1999)

With James Carter

- Chasin' the Gypsy (Atlantic, 2000)
- Caribbean Rhapsody (EmArcy, 2011)

With Sir Simon Rattle, Luther Henderson, City of Birmingham Symphony Orchestra, Lena Horne

- Classic Ellington (EMI Classics, 2000)

With Carmen Lundy

- Something to Believe In (Justin Time, 2003) on three tracks

With Joe Jackson

- The Duke (Razor & Tie, 2012) on three tracks
- Fast Forward (Caroline, 2015) on four tracks

With Eddie Palmieri

- Listen Here! (Concord Records, 2005)

With Danilo Perez

- Motherland (Verve Records, 2000)

With Wynton Marsalis

- Blood on the Fields (Columbia Records, 1997)

With the Soldier String Quartet

- In Four Color (2015)
- Inspect for Damaged Gods (2004)
- Jazz Standards on Mars (1997), with Robert Dick, Richard Bona

With Dave Soldier

- Chamber Music (2006) on one track

== Notes ==
- W. Enstice, J. Stockhouse Jazzwomen. Conversations with 21 Musicians. Bloomington, 2004. ISBN 0-253-34436-0, pp. 65ff. (bio & interview)
