= Cyrus Chestnut =

American jazz pianist and composer (b. 1963)

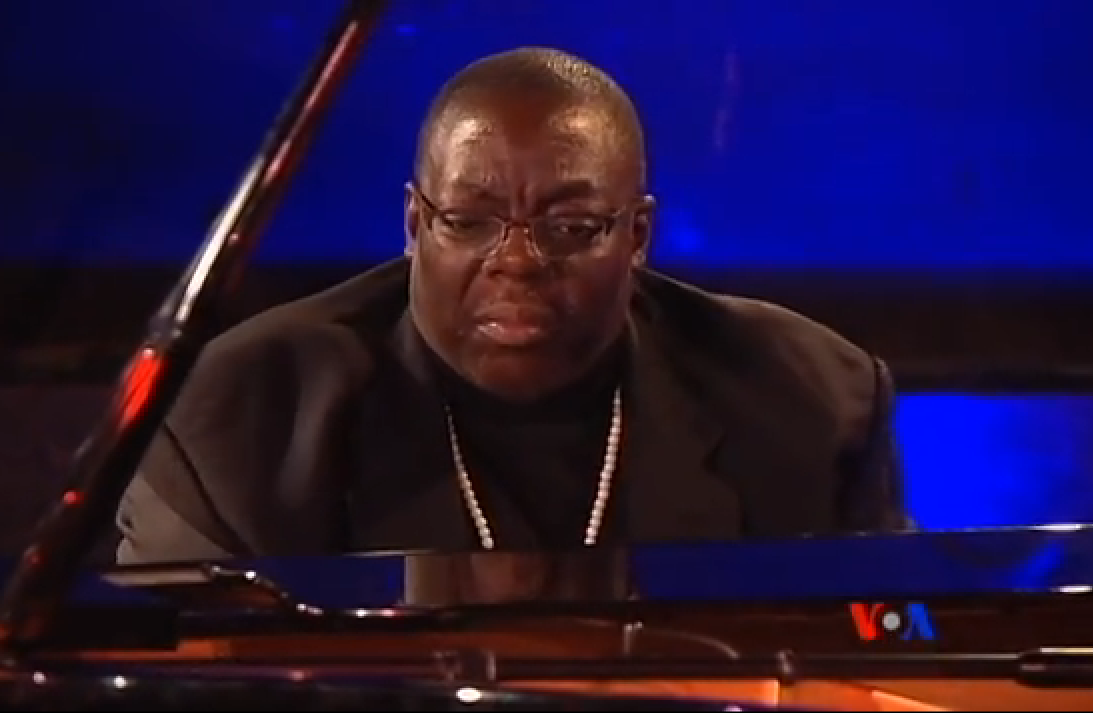

Background information
- Born: January 17, 1963 (age 63); Baltimore, Maryland, U.S.
- Genres: Jazz, blues
- Occupations: Musician, composer, producer
- Instrument: Piano
- Years active: 1992–present
- Labels: Alfa, Evidence, Atlantic, Warner Bros., Telarc, WJ3
- Website: www.cyruschestnut.net

Cyrus Chestnut (born January 17, 1963) is an American jazz pianist, composer and producer. In 2006, Josh Tyrangiel, music critic for Time, wrote: "What makes Chestnut the best jazz pianist of his generation is a willingness to abandon notes and play space."

== Early life ==
Cyrus Chestnut was born in Baltimore, Maryland, in 1963, the son of McDonald (a retired post-office employee and church pianist) and Flossie (a city social services worker and church choir director). Chestnut began learning the piano at the age of seven, and in his boyhood played at Mount Calvary Baptist Church. By the age of nine, he was studying classical music at the Peabody Institute. In 1985, Chestnut earned a degree in jazz composition and arranging from Boston's Berklee College of Music.

== Jazz career ==
In the late 1980s and early 1990s, Chestnut worked with Wynton Marsalis, Terence Blanchard, Donald Harrison, and other bandleaders. He joined the band of jazz vocalist Betty Carter in the early 1990s and appeared on her 1992 album It's Not About the Melody. That same year, he recorded his first albums as a bandleader, The Nutman Speaks and Nut. Chesnut has continued to work and record as a bandleader into the 21st century.

In 2006, Telarc released Genuine Chestnut, his first album for the label. On it he is accompanied by his regular trio of Michael Hawkins, bass and Neal Smith, drums. Additional artists on this session include Russell Malone, guitar and Steven Kroon, percussion. It includes jazz interpretations of some well-known pop numbers of the past half-century, including "If", the early 1970s soft-rock ballad by Bread. "This song has been with me ever since the sixth grade," Chestnut recalled, "I had to play it for my English teacher's wedding. I've played it in many and various contexts. I actually played it in a Top 40 band when I was just out of school. A lot of time has passed, but then recently I just started thinking about it again." Chestnut's own "Mason–Dixon Line" is one of the album's high points, a joyful bebop number.

== Discography ==
=== As leader/co-leader ===
Recording date	Title	Label	Year released	Notes
1992–01	The Nutman Speaks	Alfa Jazz	1992	Trio, with Christian McBride (bass), Carl Allen (drums)
1992–01	The Nutman Speaks Again	Alfa Jazz	1992	Trio, with Christian McBride (bass), Carl Allen (drums)
1993?	Another Direction	Alfa Jazz	1993	Trio, with Christian McBride (bass), Carl Allen (drums)
1993–06	Revelations	Atlantic	1994	Trio, with Christopher J. Thomas (bass), Clarence Penn (drums)
1994–08	Dark Before the Dawn	Atlantic	1995	Trio, with Steve Kirby (bass), Clarence Penn (drums)
1995–11	Earth Stories	Atlantic	1996	With Eddie Allen (trumpet), Antonio Hart (alto sax), Steve Kirby (bass), Alvester Garnett (drums)
1996?	Blessed Quietness	Atlantic	1996	Solo piano
1997–02	American Meditation	Baybridge	1997	Manhattan Trinity+1, with Antonio Hart (alto sax), George Mraz (bass), Lewis Nash (drums)
1998–01	Make Me a Memory	Baybridge	1998	Manhattan Trinity+1, with Teodross Avery (tenor, soprano sax), George Mraz (bass), Lewis Nash (drums)
1998	Cyrus Chestnut	Atlantic	1998	with James Carter (alto sax), Joe Lovano (tenor sax), Ron Carter (bass), Billy Higgins, Lewis Nash (drums), Anita Baker (vocals)
1998–11	A Love Story	M&I	1999	Manhattan Trinity+1, with Eric Alexander (tenor sax), George Mraz (bass), Lewis Nash (drums)
2000?	A Charlie Brown Christmas	Atlantic	2000	with Michael Brecker (tenor sax), Kenny Garrett (alto sax), Steve Gadd (drums), choir
2001–06–	Soul Food	Atlantic	2001	with Marcus Printup (trumpet), Wycliffe Gordon (trombone), Gary Bartz (alto sax), James Carter (tenor sax), Stefon Harris (vibraphone), Christian McBride (bass), Lewis Nash (drums)
2001–06	Love Letters	M&I	2001	Manhattan Trinity, with George Mraz (bass), Lewis Nash (drums)
2002–05	Misty	M&I	2002	Manhattan Trinity, with George Mraz (bass), Lewis Nash (drums)
2002–11	You Are My Sunshine	Warner Bros.	2003	Trio, with Michael Hawkins (bass), Neal Smith (drums)
2003–08	Alfie	M&I	2004	Manhattan Trinity, with George Mraz (bass), Lewis Nash (drums)
2004–08	Charade	M&I	2005	Manhattan Trinity, with George Mraz (bass), Lewis Nash (drums)
2005–07	Genuine Chestnut	Telarc	2006	Some tracks trio, with Michael Hawkins (bass), Neal Smith (drums); some tracks quartet with Russell Malone (guitar) added; some tracks quartet with Steven Kroon (percussion) added; some tracks quintet
2006–03	The Gentle Rain	M&I	2006	Manhattan Trinity, with George Mraz (bass), Lewis Nash (drums)
2007?	Cyrus Plays Elvis	Koch	2007	Trio, with Dezron Douglas (bass), Neal Smith (drums)
2007–05	Cyrus Chestnut Trio - Black Nile	M&I	2008	Trio, with Buster Williams (bass), Al Foster (drums)
2008-07	Spirit	Jazz Legacy	2009	Solo piano
2008–11	Sunflower - Henry Mancini Songbook	M&I	2009	Manhattan Trinity, with George Mraz (bass), Lewis Nash (drums)
2009–03	Plenty Swing, Plenty Soul with Eric Reed	Savant	2010	Co-lead with Eric Reed (piano), with Dezron Douglas (bass), Willie Jones III (drums)
2010?	Cyrus Chestnut Trio - Journeys	Jazz Legacy	2010	Trio, with Dezron Douglas (bass), Neal Smith (drums)
2010–12	The Cyrus Chestnut Quartet	WJ3	2012	Quartet, with Stacy Dillard (tenor and soprano saxophones), Dezron Douglas (bass), Willie Jones III (drums)
2011–03	Cyrus Chestnut Trio - Moonlight Sonata	Venus	2011	Trio, with Dezron Douglas (bass), Neal Smith (drums)
2013–03	Soul Brother Cool	WJ3	2013	Quartet, with Freddie Hendrix (trumpet), Dezron Douglas (bass), Willie Jones III (drums)
2013–11	Midnight Melodies	Smoke Sessions	2014	Trio, with Curtis Lundy (bass), Victor Lewis (drums)
2014–11	A Million Colors in Your Mind	Highnote	2015	Trio, with David Williams (bass), Victor Lewis (drums)
2015–11	Natural Essence	Highnote	2016	Trio, with Buster Williams (bass), Lenny White (drums)
2017–02	There's a Sweet, Sweet Spirit	Highnote	2017	Most tracks trio, with Buster Williams (bass), Lenny White (drums); some tracks quartet, with Steve Nelson (vibraphone)
2018–04	Kaleidoscope	Highnote	2018	Trio, with Eric Wheeler (bass), Chris Beck (drums)
2021–12	My Father's Hands	Highnote	2022	Trio, with Peter Washington (bass), Lewis Nash (drums)

=== As sideman ===
With Betty Carter

- It's Not About the Melody (Verve, 1992)
- The Music Never Stops (Blue Engine, 2019)

With James Carter

- In Carterian Fashion (Atlantic, 1998)
- Gold Sounds (Brown Brothers, 2005)

With Michael Carvin

- Between Me and You (Muse, 1989)
- Revelation (Muse, 1991)

With Freddy Cole

- Always (Fantasy, 1995)
- A Circle of Love (Fantasy, 1996)
- To The Ends of the Earth (Fantasy, 1997)
- Le Grand Freddy (Fantasy, 1999)

With Carla Cook

- It's All About Love (MaxJazz, 1999)
- Dem Bones (MaxJazz, 2001)
- Simply Natural (MaxJazz, 2002)

With Dee Daniels

- State of the Art (Criss Cross, 2013)
- Intimate Conversations (Origin, 2014)

With Cynthia Felton

- Afro Blue: The Music of Oscar Brown Jr. (CD Baby, 2012)
- Freedom Jazz Dance (CD Baby, 2012)
- Save Your Love For Me (CD Baby, 2014)

With Donald Harrison

- Full Circle (Sweet Basil, 1990)
- For Art's Sake (Candid, 1991)
- Indian Blues (Candid, 1995)
- Big Chief (Past Perfect, 2002)

With Vincent Herring

- Folklore: Live at the Village Vanguard (MusicMasters, 1994)
- Don't Let It Go (MusicMasters, 1995)
- Days of Wine and Roses (MusicMasters, 1996)
- The Uptown Shuffle (Smoke Session, 2014)
- Hard Times (Smoke Sessions, 2017)

With Denise Jannah

- I Was Born In Love With You (Blue Note, 1995)
- A Heart Full of Music (Timeless, 2000)

With George Kawaguchi

- Between Me and You (Muse, 1989)
- Revelation (Muse, 1991)
- Plays Herbie Hancock (King Japan, 2004)

With Wynton Marsalis

- The Marciac Suite (Columbia, 2000)
- Higher Ground (Blue Note, 2005)

With George Mraz

- Bottom Lines (Milestone, 1997)
- Duke's Place (Milestone, 1999)

With Jimmy Scott

- Mood Indigo (Milestone, 2000)
- Moon Glow (Milestone, 2003)

With Jae Sinnett

- Blue Jae (Valley Vue, 1992)
- House and Sinnett (Positive Music, 1994)
- Listen (Heart Music, 1997)

With Tim Warfield

- Cool Blue (Criss Cross, 1995)
- A Whisper in the Midnight (Criss Cross, 1996)
- Gentle Warrior (Criss Cross, 1998)
- Jazz Is (Criss Cross, 2002)
- Eye of the Beholder (Criss Cross, 2013)

With Dave Young

- Two by Two, Volume Two (Justin Time, 1996)
- Side by Side (Justin Time, 1996)

With others

- Gerald Albright, Giving Myself to You (Atlantic, 1995)
- Carl Allen, Testimonial (Atlantic, 1995)
- Carl Allen & Rodney Whitaker, Get Ready (Mack Avenue, 2009)
- Tiffany Austin, Unbroken (Con Alma, 2018)
- Gary Bartz, The Blues Chronicles: Tales of Life (Atlantic, 1996)
- Kathleen Battle, So Many Stars (Sony, 1995)
- Alexander Berenson, Take Me With You (Butman Music, 2010)
- Dee Dee Bridgewater, Prelude to a Kiss: The Duke Ellington Album (Phillips, 1996)
- Jeri Brown, Fresh Start (Justin Time, 1996)
- Ronnie Burrage, Shuttle (Sound Hills, 1993)
- Ann Hampton Callaway, To Ella with Love (Sin-Drome Records, 1996)
- Elvis Costello and the Brodsky Quartet, The Juliet Letters (Warner Bros., 1993)
- Michael Dease, Grace (Jazz Legacy, 2010)
- Dr. John and the Donald Harrison Band, Funky New Orleans (Metro, 2000)
- The Dizzy Gillespie All-Star Big Band, I'm BeBoppin' Too (Half Note, 2009)
- Jimmy Greene, Beautiful Life (Mack Avenue, 2014)
- Mark Gross, Blackside (Jazz Legacy, 2012)
- Roy Hargrove, With the Tenors of Our Time (Verve, 1994)
- Laird Jackson, Quiet Flame (Venus, 2016)
- The Keystone Quartet, A Love Story (32 Jazz, 2000)
- Kevin Mahogany, Another Time Another Place (Warner Bros., 1997)
- Christian McBride, Gettin' to It (Verve, 1995)
- Bette Midler, Bathhouse Betty (Warner Bros., 1998)
- Charnett Moffett, Music from Our Soul (Motéma Music, 2017)
- Roy Nathanson, Fire at Keaton's Bar & Grill (Six Degrees, 2000)
- Chiara Pancaldi, I Walk a Little Faster (Challenge Records, 2015)
- Madeleine Peyroux, Dreamland (Atlantic, 1996)
- Morris Robinson, Going Home (Decca, 2007)
- Jackie Ryan, Doozy (Open Arts, 2008)
- Ameen Saleem, The Groove Lab (Jando Music, 2013)
- Andy Scott, Angels (Jazz Legacy, 2015)
- Marilyn Scott, Every Time We Say Goodbye (Venus, 2008)
- Bud Shank, By Request: Bud Shank Meets the Rhythm Section (Milestone, 1997)
- Billy Taylor, Taylor Made at the Kennedy Center (Kennedy Center, 2005)
- Joris Teepe and The Don Braden Quintet, Pay As You Earn (Mons, 1995)
- Sadao Watanabe, Remembrance (Verve, 1999)
- Kim Waters, Tribute (Warlock, 1992)
- Rodney Whitaker, Children of the Light (Koch, 1996)
- Phil Wilson's Rainbow Band, Latin American Tour (Shiah, 1985)
- Steve Wilson, Step Lively (Criss Cross, 1995)
- Joh Yamada, Bluestone (Milestone, 1999)

=== Compilations ===
Year	Title	Genre	Label	Notes
1994	Jazz at Lincoln Center Presents: The Fire of the Fundamentals	Jazz	Sony	with Lincoln Center Jazz Orchestra, Wynton Marsalis, Kenny Barron, Betty Carter, Chris Thomas, Christian McBride, et al.
1996	Nut	Jazz	Alfa Jazz	[2CD] Combined The Nutman Speaks and The Nutman Speaks Again
1999	Essential Young Lions Vol. 1	Jazz	Hip-O	with Roy Hargrove, Larry Goldings Trio, Stefon Harris, Donald Harrison, The Benny Green Trio, Stefon Harris, et al.
2000	Piano Grand! A Smithsonian Celebration	classical, jazz and rock & roll	Sony	with Diana Krall, Jean-Yves Thibaudet, Dave Brubeck, Billy Joel, Jerry Lee Lewis, Robert Levin, et al.
2003	Torch: A Six Degrees Collection of Modern Torch Songs	Jazz	Six Degrees	with Cassandra Wilson, Bugge Wesseltoft, Roy Nathanson, Sylk 130, Elvis Costello, dZihan & Kamien, Sarah Cracknell, et al.
2007	Funky Jazz Party, Vol. 2: Love Jams	Jazz	Atlantic	with Anita Baker, Steve Cole, Wayman Tisdale, Gerald Albright, Brian Culbertson, Rick Braun, et al.
