= Bernard Sauvat =

French singer and songwriter (born 1941)

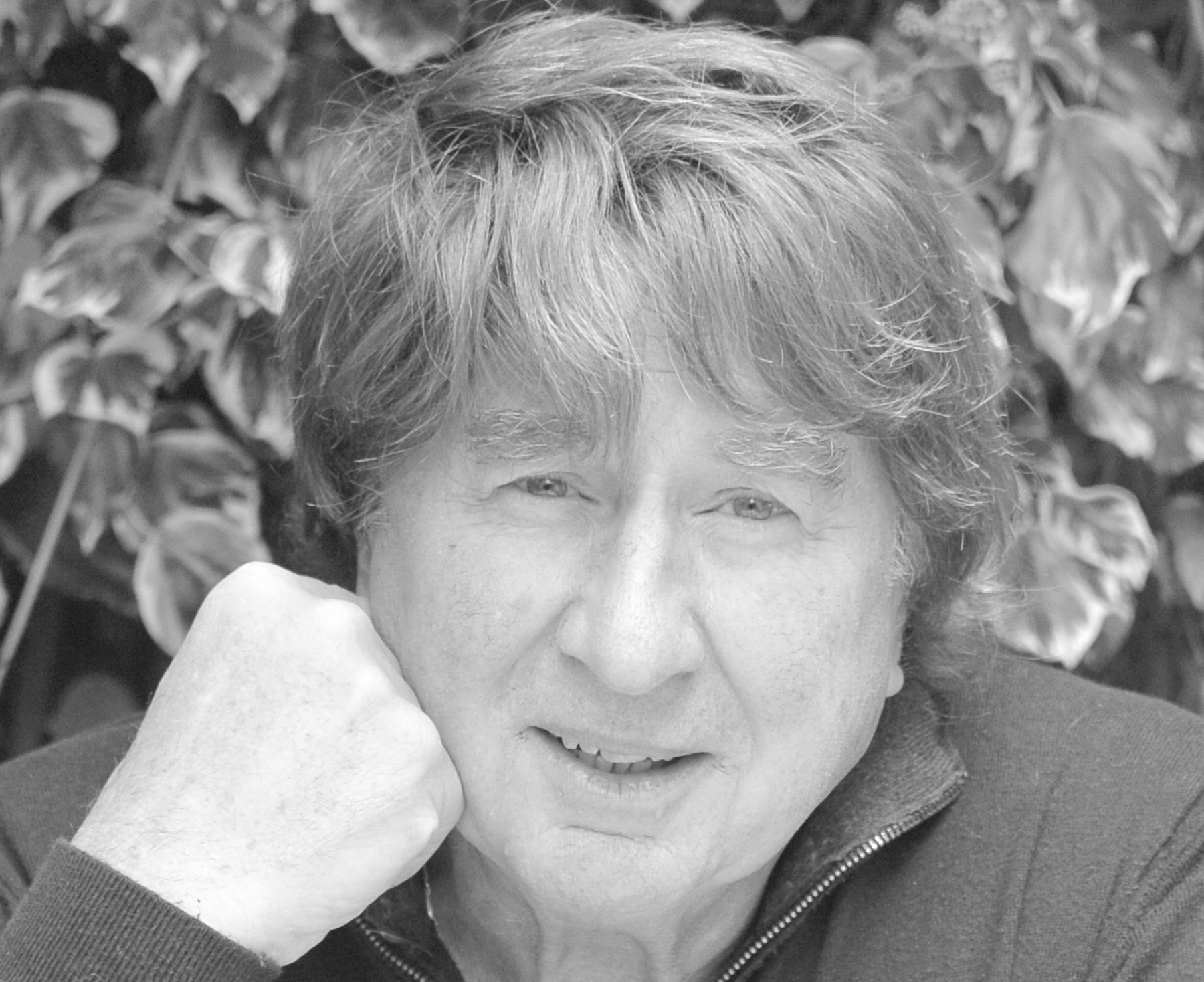
Bernard Sauvat

Bernard Sauvat (born 1941) is a French singer and songwriter.

A math teacher who taught physics, Sauvat was discovered in 1970 by Lucien Morisse, the director of Europe 1.

Some of his memorable songs include L'amour, il faut être deux (1972), La robe verte (1973), Le professeur est un rêveur (1974), L'Amitié (1975) and Un jour lointain.
