= Donald Washington Sr. =

American jazz musician

Donald Washington Sr. (1930—December 1, 2009), was an American jazz tenor saxophonist.

== Formative years ==
Washington was born in West Philadelphia in 1930 and was raised in Southwest Philadelphia. He graduated from Murrell Dobbins Career and Technical Education High School in 1948 and was a two-sport athlete, taking up swimming and basketball.

== Career ==
From 1965 through 1990, he worked for Food Fair Services as a warehouse attendant. While there, he won trophies and awards on the company's amateur boxing team. But jazz was always his life and his passion. He studied at private and public institutions, starting to play the saxophone as an elder statesman on Philadelphia's jazz scene since the late 1960s to the mid-1980s.

As a leader, Washington founded the Marlboro Men, a group that toured Haiti, Jamaica and the Virgin Islands. He also performed with Donald Byrd, Jerry Butler, Nat King Cole, Sammy Davis Jr., B.B. King, Diana Ross, Neil Sedaka and Horace Silver.

When not traveling, Washington jammed regularly in Saturday Nights at Natalie's Lounge in West Philadelphia. His students included Grover Washington Jr., George Howard.

Washington was married twice and had nine children from his first marriage.

== Death ==
Washington died on December 1, 2009, in Haddon Heights, New Jersey, at the age of 79, following complications from lung cancer.
