= James Carter (musician) =

American jazz musician (born 1969)

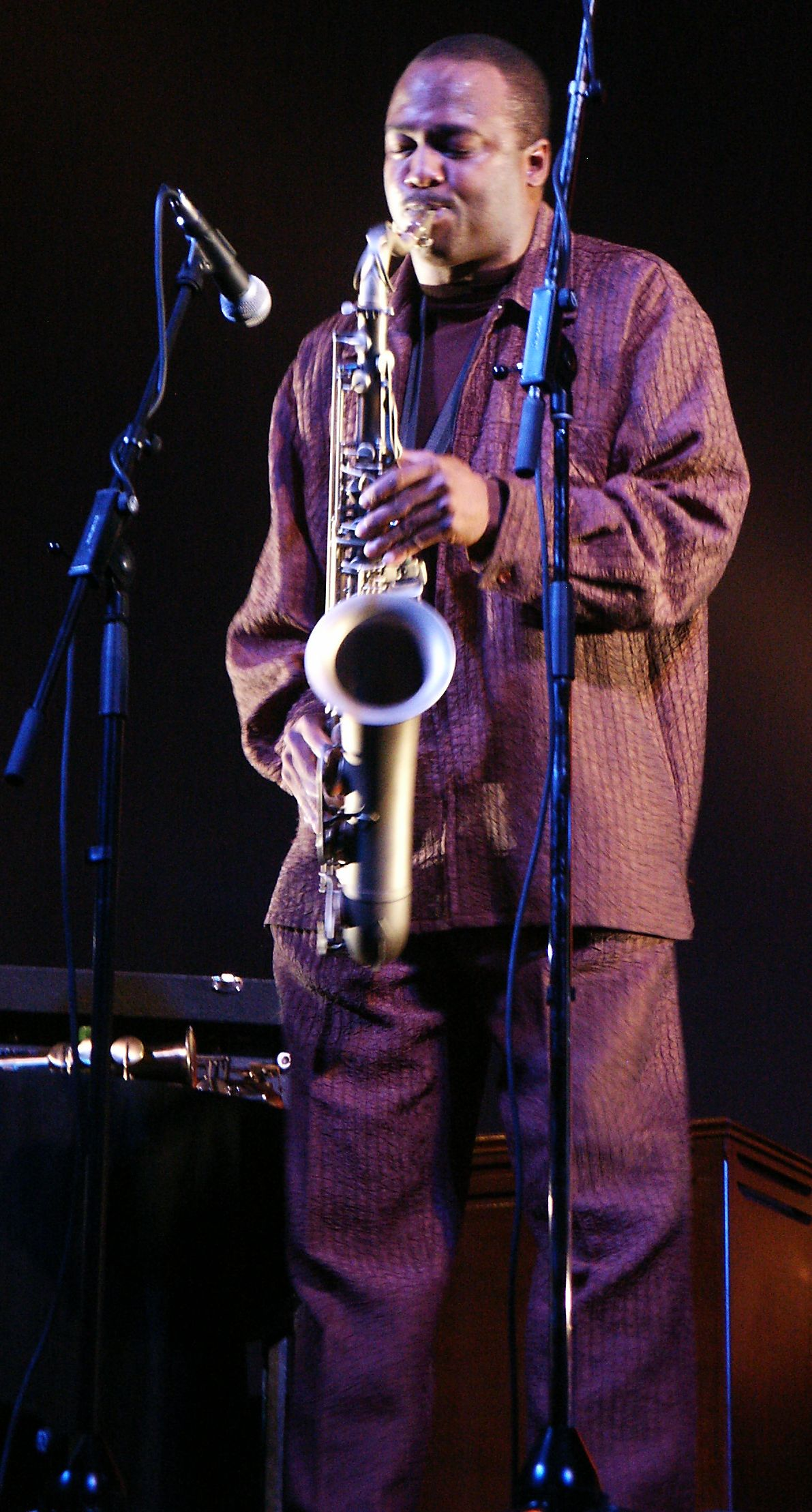
- James Carter, Bad Ischl 2006

Background information
- Born: January 3, 1969 (age 57)
- Origin: Detroit, Michigan, U.S.
- Genre: Jazz
- Occupation: Musician
- Instruments: Bass clarinet Saxophones; Flutes
- Labels: DIW; Atlantic; Columbia; Half Note
- Website: jamescarterlive.com

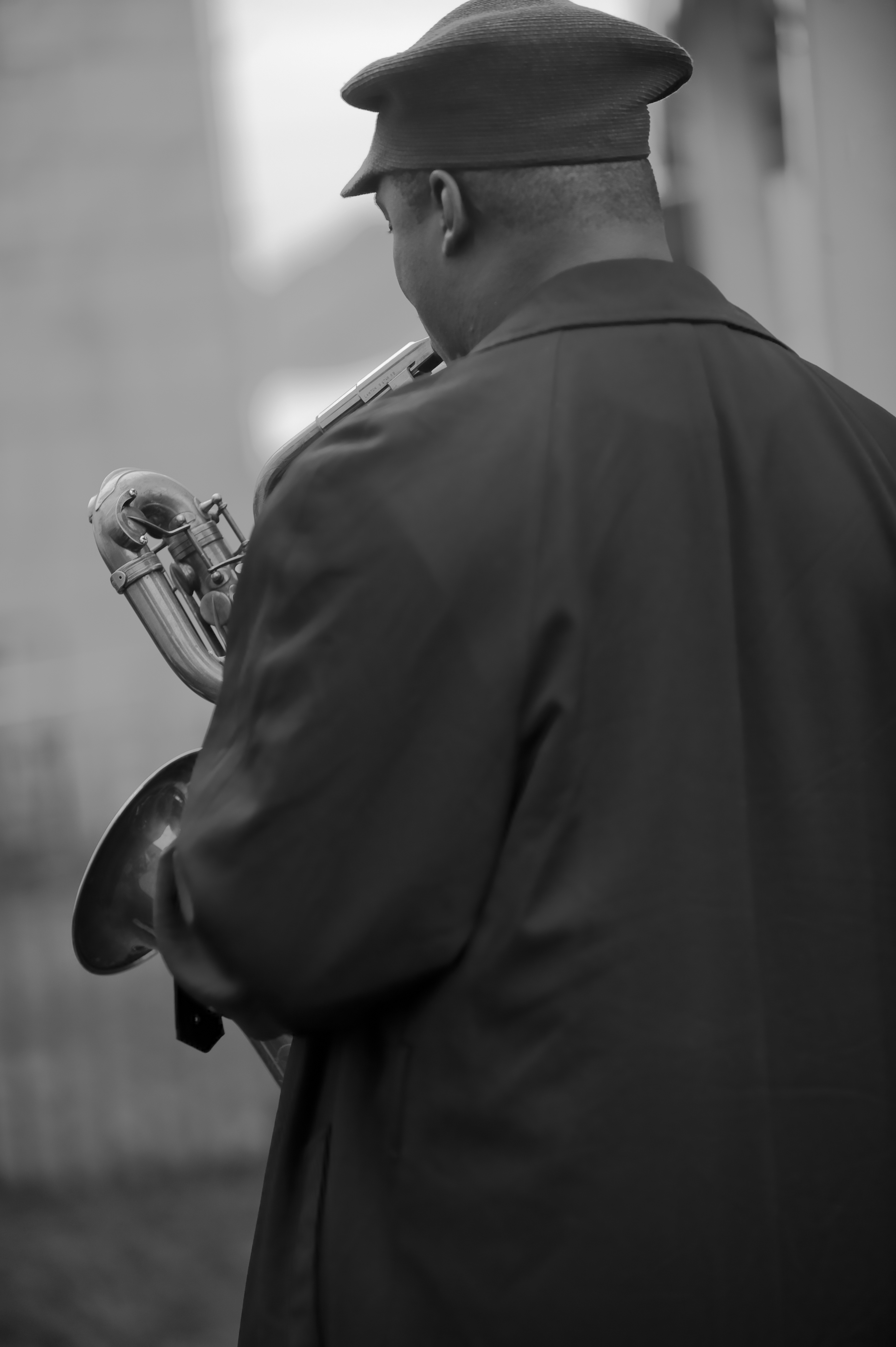
Carter at the 55th CareFusion Jazz Festival, hosted by George Wein in Newport, RI

James Carter (born January 3, 1969) is an American jazz musician widely recognized for his technical virtuosity on saxophones and a variety of woodwinds. He is the cousin of noted jazz violinist Regina Carter.

== Biography ==
Carter was born in Detroit, Michigan, and learned to play under the tutelage of Donald Washington, becoming a member of his youth jazz ensemble Bird-Trane-Sco-NOW!! As a young man, Carter attended Blue Lake Fine Arts Camp, becoming the youngest faculty member at the camp. He first toured Scandinavia with the International Jazz Band in 1985 at the age of 16.

On May 31, 1988, at the Detroit Institute of Arts (DIA), Carter was a last-minute addition for guest artist Lester Bowie, which turned into an invitation to play with his new quintet (forerunner of his New York Organ Ensemble) in New York City that following November at the now defunct Carlos 1 jazz club. This was pivotal in Carter's career, putting him in musical contact with the world, and he moved to New York two years later. He has been prominent as a performer and recording artist on the jazz scene since the late 1980s, focusing on saxophones, flute and clarinets.

In 1996, he took part in Robert Altman's film Kansas City, where he played Ben Webster alongside several other contemporary jazz musicians playing the roles of players from the 1930s, including Joshua Redman as Lester Young, Craig Handy as Coleman Hawkins and Geri Allen as Mary Lou Williams. "Seldom Seen" 's fictional "Hey Hey Club" set the stage for several jam sessions caught on film in real time and included on a soundtrack produced by Hal Willner and trumpeter Steven Bernstein.

Carter embraces all elements of jazz history, from dixieland to fusion to free jazz, and was one of the few prominent players of his generation to do so, participating in a number of projects in all these styles, and incorporating these different influences in the compositions and soloing on his own albums.

On his album Chasin' the Gypsy (2000), he recorded with his cousin Regina Carter.

Carter has won DownBeat magazine's Critics and Readers Choice award for baritone saxophone several years in a row. He has performed, toured and played on albums with Lester Bowie, Julius Hemphill, Frank Lowe & the Saxemble, Kathleen Battle, the World Saxophone Quartet, Cyrus Chestnut, Wynton Marsalis, Dee Dee Bridgewater and the Mingus Big Band.

Carter is an authority on vintage saxophones, and he owns an extensive collection of such instruments, including one formerly played by Don Byas.

== Discography ==
- 1991: Alone Together, as part of Tough Young Tenors
- 1994: JC on the Set (DIW)
- 1995: Jurassic Classics (DIW)
- 1995: The Real Quiet Storm (Atlantic)
- 1995: Duets (Atlantic) with Cyrus Chestnut [promotional CD]
- 1996: Conversin' with the Elders (Atlantic)
- 1998: In Carterian Fashion (Atlantic)
- 2000: Chasin' the Gypsy (Atlantic)
- 2000: Layin' in the Cut (Atlantic)
- 2003: Gardenias for Lady Day (Columbia)
- 2004: Live at Baker's Keyboard Lounge (Warner Bros.) - recorded 2001
- 2005: Out of Nowhere (Half Note)
- 2005: Gold Sounds (Brown Brothers)
- 2008: Present Tense (EmArcy)
- 2009: Heaven on Earth (Half Note)
- 2009: Skratyology (Stotbrock) with De Nazaten
- 2011: Caribbean Rhapsody (EmArcy)
- 2011: At the Crossroads (EmArcy)
- 2019: Live From Newport Jazz (Blue Note)
- 2023: Un (JMI Recordings)

=== As sideman ===
With Faye Carol

- A Soulful Christmas (Getdown Records, 2026)

With Faye Carol

- Faye Sings The Blues (Getdown Records, 2026)

With Karrin Allyson

- Ballads: Remembering John Coltrane (Concord Jazz, 2001)

With the Art Ensemble of Chicago

- Salutes the Chicago Blues Tradition (AECO, 1993)

With Ginger Baker and the DGQ20

- Coward of the County (Atlantic, 1999)

With Kathleen Battle

- So Many Stars (Sony Classical, 1995)

With Hamiet Bluiett

- Libation for the Baritone Saxophone Nation (Justin Time, 1998)
- Bluiett Baritone Saxophone Group Live at the Knitting Factory (Knitting Factory, 1998)

with Lester Bowie's New York Organ Ensemble

- The Organizer (DIW, 1991)
- Funky T. Cool T. (DIW, 1992)

With Dee Dee Bridgewater

- Eleanora Fagan (1915-1959): To Billie with Love from Dee Dee Bridgewater (EmArcy, 2010)

With Regina Carter

- Motor City Moments (Verve, 2000)

With Cyrus Chestnut

- Cyrus Chestnut (Atlantic, 1998)

With Jayne Cortez & The Firespitters'

- Cheerful & Optimistic (Bola Press, 1994)

With Benny Golson

- Tenor Legacy (Arkadia Jazz, 1996)

With Herbie Hancock

- Gershwin's World (Verve, 1998)

With the Julius Hemphill Sextet

- Fat Man and the Hard Blues (Black Saint, 1991)
- Five Chord Stud (Black Saint, 1994)

With D. D. Jackson

- Paired Down Volume One (Justin Time, 1997)
- Anthem (RCA Victor, 2000)

With Ronald Shannon Jackson

- What Spirit Say (DIW, 1994)
- Live in Warsaw (Knit Classics, 1994 [1999])

With Wynton Marsalis

- Blood on the Fields (Columbia, 1995)

With Christian McBride

- SciFi (Verve, 2000)

With Liz McComb

- Brassland (GVE/LMC, 2013)

With Marcus Miller

- M² (Telarc, 2001)

With Junco Onishi

- Baroque (Verve, 2010)

With Madeleine Peyroux

- Dreamland (Atlantic, 1996)

With Odean Pope

- Odeans List (In+Out, 2009)

With Steve Turre

- TNT (Trombone-N-Tenor) (Telarc, 2001)
- The Spirits Up Above (HighNote, 2004)

With Roseanna Vitro and Kenny Werner

- The Delirium Blues Project: Serve or Suffer (Half Note, 2008)

With Rodney Whitaker

- Children of the Light (DIW, 1996)
- Hidden Kingdom (DIW, 1997)

With the World Saxophone Quartet

- Yes We Can (Jazzwerkstatt, 2010)
