= Steve Turre discography =

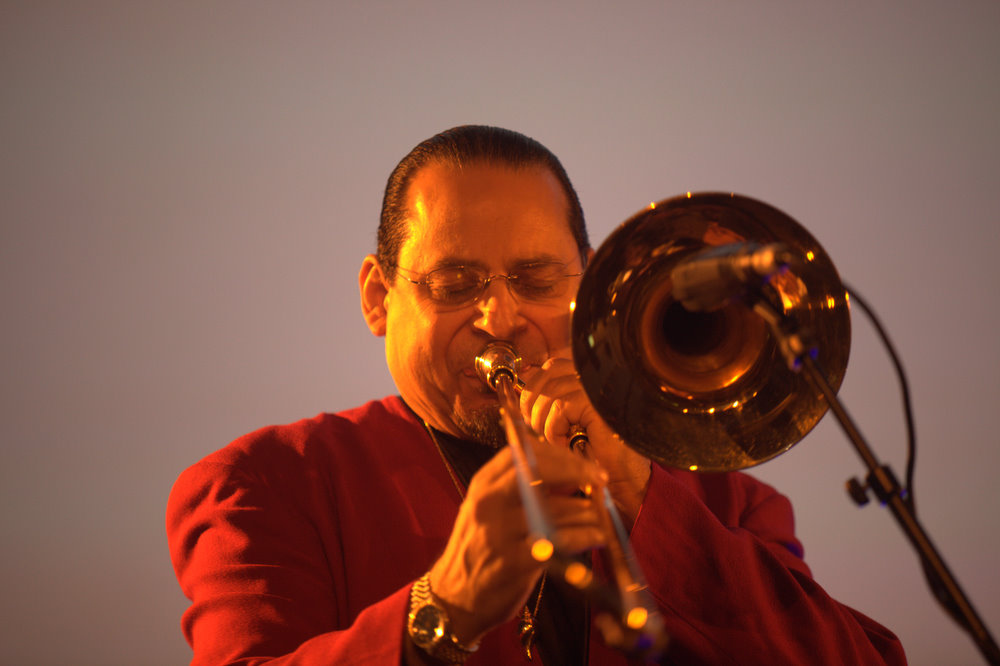
- Steve Turre performing in 2010
- As leader: 23

This article presents the discography of the American jazz trombonist Steve Turre (born September 12, 1948, in Omaha, Nebraska). In addition to the trombone, Turre is also a pioneer of using seashells as instruments, as well as a composer, arranger, and educator at the collegiate-conservatory level who, for sixty-three years, has been active in jazz, rock, and Latin jazz – in live venues, recording studios, television, and cinema production. As a studio musician, Turre is among the most prolific living jazz trombonist in the world.He has been a member of the Saturday Night Live Band since 1985.

== Selected discography ==
=== As leader ===
Year	Album title	Label	OCLC
1987	Viewpoint	Stash	18922356
1987	Viewpoints and Vibrations	Stash	20714412
1988	Fire and Ice	Stash	20176471
1989	Dedication	JMT	57037029
1991	Right There	Antilles	26215327
1993	Sanctified Shells	Antilles	28310905
1995	Rhythm Within, with Herbie Hancock, Pharoah Sanders	Antilles	658353959
1997	Steve Turre	Verve	37248623
1999	In the Spur of the Moment	Telarc	45040043
1999	Lotus Flower	Verve	406452520
2000	TNT (Trombone-N-Tenor)	Telarc	50116787
2003	One4J: Paying Homage to J.J. Johnson	Telarc	51833930
2004	The Spirits Up Above	HighNote	57077598
2006	Keep Searchin'	HighNote	488940684
2008	Rainbow People	HighNote	223993800
2010	Delicious and Delightful	HighNote	646105087
2012	Woody's Delight	HighNote	772189510
2013	The Bones of Art	HighNote	851434853
2015	Spiritman	Smoke Sessions	
2016	Colors for the Masters	Smoke Sessions	
2018	The Very Thought of You	Smoke Sessions	
2022	Generations	Smoke Sessions	
2024	Sanyas (Live album)	Smoke Sessions	

=== As sideman ===
Year	Artist leader	Album title	Turre's role	OCLC
1996	Monty Alexander's Ivory & Steel	To the Ends of the Earth	Trombone	35583220
1999	Monty Alexander	Stir It Up: The Music of Bob Marley	Trombone, conch (shells)	780949512
1992	Carl Allen	Dark Side of Dewey	Trombone, shells	35090210
1993	Carl Allen	Pursuer	Trombone, shells	30422672
2000	Eddie Allen	Summer Days	Trombone	47196641
1989	Laurie Anderson	Strange Angels	Trombone, conch	24659935
1990	Art Ensemble of Chicago & Bowie's Brass Fantasy	Live at the 6th Tokyo Music Joy	Trombone, arranger, conch	27039443
1972	Carlos Santana	Caravanserai	Trombone	53287067
1999	Carlos Santana	Supernatural	Trombone	41597695
2002	Art Ensemble of Chicago	Rarum VI: Selected Recordings	Trombone	50209195
2000	Ray Barretto	Portraits in Jazz and Clave	Trombone, shells	44555369
2001	Andy Bey	Tuesdays in Chinatown	Trombone	48843923
1973	Art Blakey	Anthenagin	Trombone	6010133
1973	Art Blakey	Mission Eternal, Vol. 2	Trombone	34188810
1999	Terence Blanchard	Jazz in Film	Trombone	41085300
2008	T.K. Blue	Follow the North Star	Trombone	728158158
2011	T.K. Blue	Latinbird	Trombone, shells	703213949
1972	Jack Bonus	Jack Bonus	Trombone	30424964
1999	Jimmy Bosch	Salsa Dura	Trombone	65967385
1980	Lester Bowie	Works	Trombone	23446289
1985	Lester Bowie's Brass	I Only Have Eyes for You	Trombone	13282730
1986	Lester Bowie's Brass	Avant Pop	Trombone, arranger	41643527
1987	Lester Bowie	Twilight Dreams	Trombone	18196736
1989	Lester Bowie	Serious Fun	Trombone, arranger	50115826
1990	Lester Bowie	My Way	Trombone, arranger, conch	55485290
1991	Lester Bowie's N.Y. Organ Ensemble	The Organizer	Trombone	26480453
1991	Lester Bowie's N.Y. Organ Ensemble	Funky T. Cool T.	Trombone	46429657
1992	Lester Bowie's Brass Fantasy	The Fire This Time	Arranger	33464553
1991	Don Braden	Wish List	Trombone	30373728
1992	Cecil Bridgewater	I Love Your Smile	Trombone	29063223
1996	Kenny Burrell & The Jazz Heritage All Stars	Live at the Blue Note	Trombone	35776997
1995	Henry Butler	For All Seasons	Trombone	34600953
1992	Mariah Carey	MTV Unplugged	Trombone	
1996	The Carnegie Hall Jazz Band	Carnegie Hall Jazz Band	Trombone	35091921
1995	Regina Carter	Regina Carter	Trombone	32680128
2000	Cyrus Chestnut & Friends	Charlie Brown Christmas	Trombone, shells	45200679
1993	Freddy Cole	This is the Life	Trombone	51520797
1987	Celia Cruz & Willie Colon	Winners	Trombone	212910790
1997	Michael Davis	Absolute Trombone	Trombone	40937627
1985	Deadline	Down by Law	Didjeridoo, conch	21998535
2006	Mercan Dede	Breath	shells	172985913
2006	Joshua Edelman	Calle Del Rosario	Trombone	
2000	Lew Del Gatto	Katewalk	Trombone	473844747
1993	Charles Fambrough	Blues at Bradley's	Trombone, shells	29348227
1991	Ricky Ford	Hot Brass	Trombone	27853139
1992	G. E. Smith & The SNL Band	Get a Little	Trombone, conch	27666899
1990	Larry Gales	Message from Monk	Trombone	28340219
1989	Dizzy Gillespie & The United Nation Orchestra	Live at the Royal Festival Hall	Trombone, bass trombone, shells	27789084
2000	Dizzy Gillespie	Live – Royal Festival Hall	Trombone, conch	67396329
1979	Jerry Gonzalez	Ya Yo Me Cure	Percussion, trombone, conch	21882458
1982	Jerry Gonzalez & the Fort Apache Band	River is Deep	Trombone, bass trombone	9719353
1993	Johnny Griffin Quartet	Dance of Passion	Trombone	27835246
1989	Don Grolnick	Complete Blue Note Recordings	Trombone	39952910
1992	Don Grolnick	Nighttown	Trombone	27925558
1975	Chico Hamilton	Peregrinations	Bass, trombone	8464533
1976	Chico Hamilton	Chico Hamilton and the Players	Electric bass, bass trombone	
2001	Chico Hamilton	Foreststorn	Trombone (guest appearance)	67681567
1979	Slide Hampton	World of Trombones	Trombone	5505976
1993	Slide Hampton & the Jazz Masters	Dedicated to Diz	Trombone	5505976
1996	Tom Harrell	Labyrinth	Trombone	35130103
2006	Stefon Harris	African Tarantella	Trombone	76171306
1998	Stefon Harris	Cloud of Red Dust	Trombone, shells	40111079
1999	Stefon Harris	Black Action Figure	Trombone	42647967
2003	Stefon Harris	Grand Unification Theory	Trombone, shells	51805851
1993	Antonio Hart	For Cannonball & Woody	Trombone	29577851
1998	Antonio Hart	Collected Antonio Hart	Trombone	52331640
2007	Marion Hayden	Visions	Trombone	
1981	Terumasa Hino	Double Rainbow	Didjeridoo	28289611
1999	Yoron Israel Connection	Live at the Blue Note	Trombone, shells	47749181
1960	J.J. Johnson Sextet	J.J. Inc.	Liner notes	37650081
1996	J.J. Johnson	Brass Orchestra	Trombone	37826339
1999	Etta Jones	All the Way	Trombone	45038875
2004	Etta Jones	Always in Our Hearts	Trombone	55646400
1997	K-Jazz All Stars Y Amigos	Spirit Talk	Trombone, shells	56189516
1973	Rahsaan Roland Kirk	Man Who Cried Fire	Trombone	23466216
1976	Rahsaan Roland Kirk	Simmer, Reduce, Garnish & Serve	Trombone	33180254
1976	Rahsaan Roland Kirk	Kirkatron	Trombone	3660523
1977	Rahsaan Roland Kirk	Boogie-Woogie String Along for Real	Trombone	62275276
1998	Rahsaan Roland Kirk	Standing Eight	Trombone	41113094
2000	Rahsaan Roland Kirk	Incontournables	Trombone	
2002	Lenine	Falange Canibal	Trombone, shells	51716963
1998	Ron Levy's Wild Kingdom	Greaze Is What's Good	Trombone, shells	46644588
2005	Babatunde Lea	Suite Unseen: Summoner of the Ghost	Trombone, shells	61484060
1985	Carmen Lundy	Good Morning Kiss	Trombone	15872652
2005	Carmen Lundy	Jazz & the New Songbook, Live at the Madrid	Trombone	774918249
1989	Harold Mabern	Afro Blue	Trombone	
1989	Machete Ensemble	Africa, Vol. 1	Trombone	23672372
2010	John Santos	Filosofia Caribena, Vol. 1	Trombone	777668371
1999	Howard Mandel	Future Jazz	Trombone	39477839
2006	Marco Marzola	Important Life	Trombone	
1994	Christian McBride	Getting' to It	Trombone	31922436
1998	Chico Mendoza	Chico Mendoza & the Latin Jazz Dream Band	Trombone	
1997	Mingus Big Band	Que Viva Mingus!	Trombone, shells	38446221
1988	Ralph Moore	Rejuvenate!	Trombone, conch	31693624
2001	David "Fathead" Newman	Keep the Spirits Singing	Trombone	53040367
1986	James Newton	Romance and Revolution	Trombone	16222377
1997	Nuyorican Soul	Nuyorican Soul	Percussion, trombone	36781348
1999	Manny Oquendo & Libre	Ahora	Trombone, plunger mute	593795119
1983	[Manny Oquendo & Libre	Ritmo, Sonido, y Estilo	Trombone, shells	33085784
2001	Jann Parker	Voicings	shells	
1998	Joe Pesci	Vincent Laguardia Gambini Sings	Trombone	40426777
1987	Daniel Ponce	Arawe	Trombone	21253691
1997	Tito Puente	50 Years of Swing: 50 Great Years	Trombone	37249418
1995	Tito Puente	Tito's Idea	Trombone, performer	33231201
2003	Phil Ranelin	Close Encounter of the Very Best Kind	Trombone, shells	55998177
1989	Lou Rawls	At Last	Trombone (soloist), conch	20124757
1989	Lou Rawls	Ballads	Trombone	178691047
1990	Lou Rawls	It's Supposed to Be Fun	Trombone	22753722
1992	Lou Rawls	Legendary Lou Rawls	Trombone	25709679
1993	Max Roach	Max Roach & New Orchestra of Boston	Trombone	34980667
2000	Nick Rolfe	Persuader	Trombone	48574591
2002	Renee Rosnes	Life on Earth	Trombone	48963483
1990	Gabrielle Roth	Ritual	Trombone, shells	28197471
1996	Gabrielle Roth	Stillpoint	Seashells, didgeridoo	53449918
1993	Vanessa Rubin	Pastiche	Seashells, didgeridoo	28116965
1995	Vanessa Rubin	Vanessa Rubin Sings	Trombone	42560595
1984	Hilton Ruiz	Cross Currents	Trombone, conch	32437748
1986	Hilton Ruiz Ensemble	Something Grand	Trombone, arranger	17230739
1993	Hilton Ruiz	Heroes	Trombone, bells, shells	33290631
1981	Pharoah Sanders	Rejoice	Trombone	27251535
1989	John Scofield	Best of John Scofield	Trombone	
1995	John Scofield	Groove Elation	Trombone	33482305
2000	John Scofield	Steady Groovin'	Trombone	45625306
1992	Charlie Sepulveda	Algo Nuestro (Our Thing)	Trombone	28550611
2005	Naima Shamborguer	From My Heart to Yours	Trombone	190772861
1974	Woody Shaw	The Moontrane	Trombone	6431690
1975	Woody Shaw	Love Dance	Trombone	4766584
1977	Woody Shaw	Rosewood	Trombone	40999163
1978	Woody Shaw	Woody III	Trombone	5714135
1980	Woody Shaw	For Sure!	Trombone, bass trombone	7436717
1981	Woody Shaw	United	Trombone	8630672
1982	Woody Shaw	Lotus Flower	Trombone, bass trombone	9149433
1982	Woody Shaw	Master of the Art	Percussion, trombone	9171962
1982	Woody Shaw	Night Music	Trombone	12917626
1983	Woody Shaw	The Time Is Right	Trombone	38479081
1987	Woody Shaw	Imagination	Trombone, shells	55619930
2001	Woody Shaw	Woody Shaw Live Volume Two	Trombone	50118393
2002	Woody Shaw	Woody Shaw Live Volume Three	Trombone	53995035
2005	Woody Shaw	Woody Shaw Live Volume Four	Trombone	62163736
1979	Archie Shepp	Attica Big Band	Trombone	876236466
1996	Archie Shepp	Attica Blues Big Band	Trombone	
1996	Horace Silver	Hardbop Grandpop	Trombone, arranger	35091908
1972	Paul Simon	Paul Simon	shells	55766490
1992	Hal Singer	No Rush	Trombone	716539328
1993	The Skatalites	Ska Voovee	Trombone	29578313
1994	The Skatalites	Hi-Bop Ska	Trombone	
1996	The Skatalites	Greetings from Skamania	Trombone	
1996	Carol Sloane	Songs Sinatra Sang	Trombone	35583202
2001	Carol Sloane	Ballad Essentials	Trombone	48051803
2001	Harold Smith	Valley of Sacred Sound	Trombone, shells	471584751
1987	Bob Stewart	First Line	Trombone, shells	57037001
1988	Bob Stewart	Goin' Home	Trombone	57037034
1996	Bob Stewart	Then & Now	Trombone	36503030
2005	Monnette Sudler	Meeting of the Spirits	Trombone	502292482
1997	Swing Summit	Passing the Torch, Vol. 2	Trombone, shells	49414196
2002	Juan Pablo Torres	Together Again	Trombone	50450768
2005	Billy Taylor	Taylor Made at the Kennedy Center	Trombone	76952165
1991	The Timeless All Stars	Time for the Timeless All Stars	Trombones, shells	34221280
1970	James Trumbo	Peace Before We Die	Trombone	38471133
1988	McCoy Tyner Big Band	Uptown/Downtown	Trombone	20516331
1991	Tyner Big Band	Turning Point	Trombone	
1993	McCoy Tyner Big Band	Journey	Trombone, arranger	29991637
1999	McCoy Tyner Big Band	McCoy Tyner and the Latin All-Stars	Trombone, shells	41402094
2000	McCoy Tyner	Les Incontournables	Trombone	
2002	McCoy Tyner Big Band	Best of McCoy Tyner Big Band (compilation)	Trombone, arranger	51539527
1992	Dave Valentin	Red Sun	Trombone, shells	28685980
1986	Jack Walrath	Master of Suspense	Trombone	20705131
1978	Cedar Walton	Animation	Trombone, bass trombone	6308635
1986	Cedar Walton with Ron Carter	Cedar Walton Plays	Trombone	17901467
1993	Cedar Walton	Art Blakey Legacy	Trombone	716579513
1998	Cedar Walton	Bambino: Plays Music of Art Blakey	Trombone	43399293
1980	Cedar Walton	Soundscapes	Trombone	7096387
2011	Cedar Walton	The Bouncer	Trombone	763300919
1992	Bobby Watson	Tailor Made	Trombone	28368074
1990	Fred Wesley	New Friends	Trombone	24074188
1993	Frank Wess	Tryin' To Make My Blues Turn Green	Trombone, shells, conch	30607443
2008	Frank Wess	Once is Not Enough	Trombone	456745706
1990	Paul Winter Consort	Earth: Voices of a Planet	Didgeridoo	22219068
1996	Original Soundtrack	Ed's Next Move	Trombone	35840961
1985	Various Artists	New Africa, Vol. 2	shells	22583566
1989	Various Artists	15th Anniversary Stash Sampler	Trombone, arranger	28118589
1990	Various Artists	Beets	conch	27683641
1990	Various Artists	For Real Moments: Song and Dances	Trombone	27363545
1991	Various Artists	Best of Jazz Music Today	Performer	22998043
1992	Various Artists	Blue Vocals, Vol. 1	Trombone	28446775
1993	Various Artists	Music of Rahsaan Roland Kirk	Trombone, arranger, producer	16876213
1994	Various Artists	Jazz Showcase	Trombone	30715560
1994	Various Artists	Carnegie Hall Salutes the Jazz Masters	Trombone, shells, performer	30858408
1994	Various Artists	Cole Porter in Concert: Just One of Those Things	Trombone	31365642
1995	Various Artists	Jazz Trumpet: Trumpeter’s Holiday	Trombone	37765928
1995	Various Artists	The Art of Jazz: Best Loved Standards	Trombone	52598737
1995	Various Artists	The Art of Jazz: Sentimental Ballads (1995)	Trombone	36745094
1995	Various Artists	The Art of Jazz: Standards	Trombone	
1995	Various Artists	Jazz Á Go-Go	Percussion, trombone	
1996	Various Artists	Back to the Basics, Vol. 1	Trombone	44974904
1996	Various Artists	Original Jazz Masters Series: Vol. 5	Trombone	37873623
1996	Various Artists	Panasonic Village Jazz Festival	Arranger, performer	795309704
1996	Various Artists	Jazz Ballads	Trombone	
1997	Various Artists	It's Monk's Tune	Trombone	37339295
1997	Various Artists	Eastwood After Hours: Live at Carnegie Hall	Trombone	49423102
1997	Swing Summit	Passing the Torch, Vol 1	Trombone, conch	49414195
1997	Various Artists	Latin Jazz: Con Gusto	Trombone	42965698
2009	John Farnsworth Sextet	The Smoke Sessions	Trombone	
1996	Dee Dee Bridgewater	Prelude to a Kiss: The Duke Ellington Album	Trombone	35802009
2006	Chembo Corniel	Beyond Standards	Trombone	184724916
2009	Peppe Merolla	Stick With Me	Trombone, shells	
2010	Chicago Afro Latin Jazz Ensemble	Blueprints	Trombone, shells	707682567
