= Frank Lacy =

American jazz trombonist (born 1958)

- Also known as: Ku-umba Frank Lacy
- Born: August 9, 1958 (age 67); Houston, Texas, U.S.
- Genres: Jazz
- Occupations: Musician, composer, vocalist
- Instruments: Trombone, trumpet, tuba, euphonium
- Years active: 1970–present
- Label: Tutu
- Website: www.franklacy.com

Frank Lacy (born August 9, 1958, Houston, Texas) is an American jazz trombonist who has spent many years as a member of the Mingus Big Band.

== Career ==
Lacy's father was a teacher who played guitar with Arnett Cobb, Illinois Jacquet, and Eddie Cleanhead Vinson. His mother was a gospel singer. When Lacy was eight, he started learning piano. In his teens, he played trumpet, tuba, and euphonium before switching to trombone. He got a degree in physics from Texas Southern University. In 1979, he went to the Berklee College of Music in Boston, studying trombone and composition. His classmates included Branford Marsalis, Greg Osby, and Marvin Smith.

Lacy moved to New York City in 1981. In 1986, he played with Illinois Jacquet's big band, and a couple years later he was musical director for Art Blakey. He released his first album as a band leader in 1991 with his father on guitar. He has also worked with Lester Bowie, Marty Ehrlich, Michael Formanek, Slide Hampton, Roy Hargrove, Rufus Reid, Henry Threadgill, Steve Turre, McCoy Tyner, and Bobby Watson. He has spent over twenty years as a member of the Mingus Big Band.

== Discography ==
=== As leader ===
- Tonal Weights and Blue Fire (Tutu, 1990)
- Settegast Strut (Tutu, 1995)
- Songs from the Musical Poker (Tutu, 1996)
- Heaven Sent, with Mauro Ottolini (Musica, 2013)
- That Which is Planted, with 10³²K (Passin' Thru, 2013)
- Live at Smalls (Smalls Live, 2014)

=== As sideman ===
With Mingus Big Band

- Nostalgia in Times Square (Dreyfus, 1993)
- Live in Time (Dreyfus, 1996)
- Que Viva Mingus (Dreyfus, 1997)
- Tonight at Noon (2002)
- I Am Three (2005)
- Live in Tokyo at the Blue Note (2006)
- Mingus Sings (Sunnyside, 2015)

With Lester Bowie

- Avant Pop (ECM, 1986)
- Twilight Dreams (1987)
- Serious Fun (DIW, 1989)
- My Way (DIW, 1990)
- The Fire This Time (1992)

With Roy Hargrove

- Approaching Standards (Novus, 1994)
- Habana (Verve, 1997)

With David Murray

- David Murray Big Band (DIW, 1991)
- South of the Border (DIW, 1992)

With Henry Threadgill

- You Know the Number (Novus, 1986)
- Easily Slip Into Another World (Novus, 1987)

With Steve Turre

- Rhythm Within (Antilles, 1995)
- The Bones of Art (HighNote, 2013)

With McCoy Tyner

- Journey (Verve, 1993)
- The Turning Point (Verve, 1992)

With others

- Superblue, Superblue (Blue Note, 1988)
- Fleur Carnivore, Carla Bley (1988)
- Julius Hemphill Big Band, Julius Hemphill (1988)
- Chippin' In, Art Blakey (Timeless, 1990)
- Side by Side, Marty Ehrlich (1991)
- Journey to Iceland/Íslandsför, Tómas R. Einarsson (1991)
- Tailor Made, Bobby Watson (1993)
- Shuttle, Ronnie Burrage (1993)
- Low Profile, Michael Formanek (1994)
- Art, Ralph Peterson Jr. (1994)
- The Voice of the Saxophone, Don Braden (1997)
- Social Call, Jazzmeia Horn (2017)
- Abstractions in Lime Caverns, Michael Marcus (ESP-Disk', 2022)
