= Dion Parson =

American jazz drummer (born 1967)

Dion Gary Parson (born June 11, 1967) is an American jazz drummer from the U.S. Virgin Islands.

Parson was born on St. Thomas and played trombone as a child before picking up drums when he was fifteen years old. He studied at Interlochen and then at Rutgers, where he studied under Keith Copeland and took his bachelor's degree in music education in 1990. In the 1990s he was based primarily in New York City, where he worked with Monty Alexander, Ray Anderson, Dwayne Burno, Don Byron, Marc Cary, Laurent de Wilde, Donald Harrison, Ernest Ranglin, Justin Robinson, and David Sanchez. He has also worked extensively with Ron Blake and fellow Virgin Islander Reuben Rogers. He worked with the Broadway production of The Color Purple starting in 2006, and co-founded the organization United Jazz International with Steve Coleman and Branford Marsalis in 2007. He has taught at Rutgers University, Cheyney University, North Carolina University, and Harlem School of the Arts.

== Discography ==
- April in New York (Jardis,1998)
  - with Hulmut Kagerer, Peter Bernstein, and Dwayne Burno
- 21st Century (Tahman Records, 1998)
  - with Ron Blake
- People Music (Tahman Records, 2001)
- A Jazz Christmas Celebration For Banfi (Wide Music Records, 2009)
  - with Steve Turre, Sherman Irby, Akua Dixon, Nico Menci, Marco Marzola, and Darrell Green.
- Keep Searchin' (HighNote, 2006)
  - with Steve Turre
