= Twilight Dreams =

Studio album by Lester Bowie
- Released: 1987
- Recorded: April 1987
- Genre: Jazz
- Label: Venture

Lester Bowie chronology
Avant Pop (1986)	Twilight Dreams (1987)	Serious Fun (1989)

Twilight Dreams is an album by Lester Bowie, recorded for the UK-based Venture label. It is the third album by his Brass Fantasy group. It was released in 1987 and features performances by Bowie, Vincent Chancey, Frank Lacy, Steve Turre, Malachi Thompson, Rasul Siddik, Stanton Davis, Bob Stewart, and Phillip Wilson.

== Reception ==
The AllMusic review by Scott Yanow stated that "one imagines that this approach works better in concert than on record. There are some strong moments on this hard-to-find LP (such as Bowie's trumpet-drums duet with Phillip Wilson on 'Duke's Fantasy') but this is a hit-and-miss affair".

Spin wrote, "Brass Fantasy weaves between the more billowy arrangements of 'Duke's Fantasy' and the title track, and rave-ups like 'Thriller'. The music, like his attire, is adorned in ways that keep you wondering, 'Is Bowie serious?'"

Professional ratings
Review scores
Source	Rating
AllMusic	3/5 stars
The Philadelphia Inquirer	3/4 stars

== Track listing ==
1. "I Am With You" - 7:35
2. "Personality" (Harold Logan, Lloyd Price) - 3:50
3. "Duke's Fantasy" (Mal Waldron) - 9:07
4. "Thriller" (Rod Temperton) - 5:58
5. "Night Time (Is the Right Time)" (Lew Herman) - 3:31
6. "Vibe Waltz" (Lacy) - 5:09
7. "Twilight Dreams" - 6:21

All compositions by Lester Bowie except as indicated
- Recorded April 1987 at Rawlston Recording Studios, Brooklyn, NY.

== Personnel ==
- Lester Bowie: trumpet
- Vincent Chancey: French horn
- Frank Lacy: trombone
- Steve Turre: trombone
- Malachi Thompson: trumpet
- Rasul Siddik: trumpet
- Stanton Davis: trumpet
- Bob Stewart: tuba
- Phillip Wilson: drums
