= The Fire Within (disambiguation) =

The Fire Within is a 1963 French drama film starring Maurice Ronet.

The Fire Within also may refer to:

- Will O' the Wisp (novel), also published as The Fire Within and the basis of Ronet's film, by Pierre Drieu La Rochelle
- The Fire Within (novel), a 2001 children's fantasy novel written by Chris d'Lacey in The Last Dragon Chronicles
- Zameer: The Fire Within, a 2005 Bollywood film starring Ajay Devgan, Amisha Patel and Mahima Chaudhry
- The Burning Season (1993 film) (alternatively titled The Fire Within), a 1993 film starring Om Puri
- The Fire Within: A Requiem for Katia and Maurice Krafft, a 2022 documentary film directed by Werner Herzog
- "The Fire Within" (Sliders), an episode of the television series Sliders
- The Fire Within (Jennifer Thomas album), 2018
- The Fire Within (Don Braden album), 1999
- The Fire Within, a 2009 album by Ronny Munroe
- The Fire Within, a 1995 album by Hassan Hakmoun

Fire Within may refer to:

- Fire Within (Birdy album), 2013
- Fire Within, a 2004 EP by Lullacry
- "Fire Within", a song by Kamelot from the album Eternity
- "Fire Within", a song by Warmen from the album Unknown Soldier

== See also ==
- "The Fire Within Me", a song from original cast recording of the musical Little Women
- The Fire from Within, an album by Billy Bang and the Billy Bang Sextet
- Cirque du Soleil: Fire Within, a Canadian reality television series
