= The Spirits Up Above =

Studio album by Steve Turre
- Released: October 12, 2004
- Recorded: May 26, 2004
- Studio: Van Gelder Studio, Englewood Cliffs, NJ
- Genre: Jazz
- Length: 50:20
- Label: HighNote; HCD 7130
- Producer: Brian Bacchus

Steve Turre chronology
One4J (2004)	The Spirits Up Above (2004)	Keep Searchin' (2006)

The Spirits Up Above is an album by trombonist Steve Turre recorded in 2004 and released on the HighNote label.

== Reception ==
Professional ratings
Review scores
Source	Rating
AllMusic	3.5/5 stars
All About Jazz	3/5 stars
The Penguin Guide to Jazz Recordings	3.5/4 stars

The AllMusic review by Scott Yanow said "Trombonist Steve Turre pays tribute to his former employer, the remarkable multi-reedist Rahsaan Roland Kirk, on this sincere effort. Turre and an all-star group perform nine of Kirk's songs plus the trombonist's "One for Kirk." But although the music is certainly well played, one misses Rahsaan's miraculous innovations ... the craziness and wide-ranging approach of Rahsaan's performances are missing on this rather conventional effort".

On All About Jazz, John Kelman observed "Turre is in a unique position to re-evaluate the music and performances of Kirk, and deliver up The Spirits Up Above, as honest and heartfelt an homage as is possible ... The best music is meant to be a true symbiosis, and The Spirits Up Above goes a long way to breaking down any invisible barriers between those who play and those who listen".

In JazzTimes, Harvey Siders stated "It’s easy to imagine what Kirk found so attractive in Turre’s nascent technique; it must have appealed to Kirk’s desire to spread his personal gospel of “listen to and play all genres.” Ditto for the other players on the disc, particularly Carter, a monster on tenor".

The Penguin Guide to Jazz Recordings describes the album as a “delightful tribute to Rahsaan Roland Kirk, with some clever reinventions of themes which have rarely been handled by anyone else.”

== Track listing ==
All compositions by Rahsaan Roland Kirk except where noted

1. "Three for the Festival" – 3:02
2. "One for Kirk" (Steve Turre) – 5:03
3. "Medley: Serenade to a Cuckoo/Bright Moments" – 9:22
4. "Stepping Into Beauty" – 4:43
5. "The Spirits Up Above" – 4:37
6. "Hand Full of Five" – 4:48
7. "E.D." – 4:14
8. "Dorthaan's Walk" – 5:58
9. "Volunteered Slavery" – 8:33

== Personnel ==
- Steve Turre – trombone
- James Carter - tenor saxophone, flute
- Vincent Herring – alto saxophone, soprano saxophone
- Dave Valentin – flute (track 3)
- Mulgrew Miller – piano
- Buster Williams - bass
- Winard Harper – drums
- Andromeda Turre, Akua Dixon, Michael Hill, Whitney Marchell Jackson, Joe Dixon, Steve Turre – chorus (tracks 5 & 9)
