= Karlton =

Karlton is a variant spelling of Carlton. It may refer to:

== People ==
- Karlton Hester, American musician and educator
- Karlton Howard, American politician
- Karlton Rolle, Bahamian sprinter
- Karlton Rosholt, American journalist
- Lawrence K. Karlton, American judge

== Other uses ==
- Karlton Theatre, American non-profit theatrical producing organization
