= David Murray Big Band =

Studio album by David Murray
- Released: 1991
- Recorded: March 5–6, 1991
- Genre: Jazz
- Length: 71:13
- Label: DIW/Columbia

David Murray chronology
Shakill's Warrior (1991)	David Murray Big Band (1991)	The Jazzpar Prize (1992)

David Murray Big Band conducted by Lawrence "Butch" Morris is an album by David Murray released on the DIW/Columbia Records label in 1991. It features performances by Murray, Hugh Ragin, Graham Haynes, Rasul Siddik, James Zollar, Craig Harris, Frank Lacy, Al Patterson, Bob Stewart, Vincent Chancey, Khalil Henry, James Spaulding, Patience Higgins, Don Byron, John Purcell, Sonelius Smith, Fred Hopkins, Tani Tabbal conducted by Lawrence "Butch" Morris.

== Reception ==
The Allmusic review by Scott Yanow awarded the album 4 stars, stating: "The David Murray big band, which can be undisciplined and even a bit out of control, is never dull. This generally brilliant effort has quite a few highpoints... easily recommended to listeners with open ears."

Professional ratings
Review scores
Source	Rating
Allmusic	4/5 stars

== Track listing ==
1. "Paul Gonsalves" - 17:37
2. "Lester" - 9:56
3. "Ben" - 10:09
4. "Calling Steve McCall" (Morris) - 6:17
5. "Lovejoy" (Harris) - 6:11
6. "Istanbul" - 9:24
7. "David's Tune" - 7:50
8. "Let the Music Take You" (lyrics by Henderson, Harris) - 3:49

All compositions by David Murray except as indicated

  - Recorded March 5 & 6, 1991 at Clinton Recording Studios, NYC

== Personnel ==
- David Murray: tenor saxophone, bass clarinet
- Hugh Ragin: trumpet
- Graham Haynes: trumpet
- Rasul Siddik: trumpet
- James Zollar: trumpet
- Craig Harris: trombone
- Frank Lacy: trombone
- Al Patterson: trombone
- Bob Stewart: tuba
- Vincent Chancey: French horn
- Khalil Henry: flute, piccolo
- James Spaulding: alto saxophone, flute
- Patience Higgins: tenor saxophone, soprano saxophone
- Don Byron: baritone saxophone, clarinet
- John Purcell: alto saxophone, clarinet
- Sonelius Smith: piano
- Fred Hopkins: bass
- Tani Tabbal: drums
- Lawrence "Butch" Morris: conductor
- Joel A. Brandon: whistle (Track 1)
- Andy Bey: vocal (Track 8)
