= Down by Law (Deadline album) =

Studio album by Deadline
- Released: May 2, 1985
- Recorded: Evergreen Studio, NYC
- Genre: Electronic
- Length: 38:13
- Label: Celluloid
- Producer: Bill Laswell, Phillip Wilson

Deadline chronology
Down by Law (1985)	Dissident (1991)

Professional ratings
Review scores
Source	Rating
Allmusic	4.5/5 stars

Down by Law is the debut studio album by Deadline, which was released on May 2, 1985, on Celluloid Records.

== Track listing ==
No.	Title	Writer(s)	Length
1.	"Afro Beat"	Manu Dibango, Bill Laswell, Phillip Wilson	6:31
2.	"Boat Peoples"	Manu Dibango, Steve Turre, Phillip Wilson	7:03
3.	"Baliphone Dub"	Phillip Wilson	4:28
4.	"Makossa Rock"	Bill Laswell, Phillip Wilson	11:05
5.	"Gammatron"	Bill Laswell, Phillip Wilson	5:22
6.	"Doo Root"	Phillip Wilson	3:44

== Personnel ==
Musicians

- Paul Butterfield – harmonica (4)
- Olu Dara – Holztrompete and cornet (2, 4)
- Aïyb Dieng – congas and cowbell (1, 2), talking drums (4)
- Manu Dibango – tenor saxophone (1, 2, 4), voice (1, 2)
- Jonas Hellborg – bass guitar (3, 5), fuzz bass (3)
- Bill Laswell – DMX (1, 2, 3, 4, 5), bass guitar (1), shortwave (3), producer
- Jaco Pastorius – bass guitar (4)
- Steve Turre – didjeridoo (2, 4, 6), conch shells (2, 6)
- Bernie Worrell – synthesizer (1, 2, 4)
- Phillip Wilson – DMX (1, 2, 3, 4, 5), percussion (2, 5, 6), Balafon (3, 4, 6), cymbals (1, 4), bells (3), bass synthesizer (4), mbira (5), processed piano (6), floor toms (6), congas (6), cabasa (6), producer

Technical personnel

- Mike Krowiak – assistant engineer, editing
- Robert Musso – engineering, mixing
- Hahn Rowe – assistant engineer
- Robert Stevens – engineering, processed piano (3), electric piano (6)
- Howie Weinberg – mastering

== Release history ==
Region	Date	Label	Format	Catalog
United States	1985	Celluloid	CD, CS, LP	CELL 6111
France	1990	Celluloid	CD	CELD 6111
United States	1993	Celluloid	CD	CELD 6111
United Kingdom	1996	Charly	CD	CPCD 8192
