= Avant Pop =

Studio album by Lester Bowie's Brass Fantasy
- Released: 1986
- Recorded: March 1986
- Genre: Jazz
- Length: 47:10
- Label: ECM
- Producer: Manfred Eicher

Lester Bowie chronology
Duet (1985)	Avant Pop (1986)	Twilight Dreams (1988)

Avant Pop is the fourth album by Lester Bowie, recorded for ECM and the second album by his "Brass Fantasy" group. It was released in 1986 and features performances by Bowie, Vincent Chancey, Frank Lacy, Rasul Siddik, Steve Turre, Malachi Thompson, Stanton Davis, Bob Stewart and Phillip Wilson.

== Reception ==
The AllMusic review by Michael G. Nastos stated, "B+ Lester, highlight 'The Emperor'."

Professional ratings
Review scores
Source	Rating
AllMusic	2.5/5 stars
The Penguin Guide to Jazz Recordings	2.5/4 stars

== Track listing ==
1. "The Emperor" (Turre) - 10:34
2. "Saving All My Love for You" (Gerry Goffin, Michael Masser) - 5:08
3. "B Funk" - 3:50
4. "Blueberry Hill" (Al Lewis, Vincent Rose, Larry Stock) - 5:26
5. "Crazy" (Willie Nelson) - 5:28
6. "Macho" (Turre) - 6:20
7. "No Shit" - 5:14
8. "Oh, What a Night" (Johnny Funches, Marvin Junior) - 5:33

All compositions by Lester Bowie except as indicated

  - Recorded at Tonstudio Bauer, Ludwigsburg, Germany, March 1986

== Personnel ==
- Lester Bowie: trumpet
- Vincent Chancey: French horn
- Frank Lacy: trombone
- Rasul Siddik: trumpet
- Steve Turre: trombone
- Malachi Thompson: trumpet
- Stanton Davis: trumpet, flugelhorn
- Bob Stewart: tuba
- Phillip Wilson: drums
