= Picasso (album) =

Studio album by David Murray
- Released: 1993
- Recorded: September 1–11, 1992
- Genre: Jazz
- Length: 62:02
- Label: DIW
- Producer: Kazunori Sugiyama

David Murray chronology
South of the Border (1992)	Picasso (1993)	MX (1993)

Picasso is an album by the David Murray Octet, released on the Japanese DIW label in 1993. It features performances by Murray, Rasul Siddik, Hugh Ragin, Craig Harris, James Spaulding, Dave Burrell, Wilber Morris and Tani Tabbal. "Picasso Suite" is a tribute to both Pablo Picasso and Coleman Hawkins's tribute to Picasso. It was written for the Northeast Ohio Jazz Society and the Cleveland Museum of Art.

== Reception ==
The AllMusic review awarded the album 3 stars.

Professional ratings
Review scores
Source	Rating
AllMusic	3/5 stars

== Track listing ==
1. "Picasso Suite: Introduction" - 2:30
2. "Picasso Suite: Catalonian Vonz" - 9:27
3. "Picasso Suite: La Vie-The Jazz Life" - 4:38
4. "Picasso Suite: Portrait Of Sax And Yac" - 3:16
5. "Picasso Suite: Airtime For Hawkins" - 4:10
6. "Picasso Suite: When Hawk Meets Pablo" - 12:20
7. "Picasso Suite: Reprise; Catalonian Vonz" - 1:26
8. "Menehune Messages" (Burrell, Monika Larsson) - 7:43
9. "Chazz" (Morris) - 7:19
10. "Shakill's Warrior" - 9:26

All compositions by David Murray except as indicated
- Recorded September 1, 2, 9, & 11, 1992, NYC

== Personnel ==
- David Murray - tenor saxophone, bass clarinet
- Rasul Siddik - trumpet
- Hugh Ragin - trumpet
- Craig Harris - trombone
- James Spaulding - alto saxophone, flute
- Dave Burrell - piano
- Wilber Morris - bass
- Tani Tabbal - drums
