= Keep Searchin' (album) =

Studio album by Steve Turre
- Released: September 26, 2006
- Recorded: April 19, 2006
- Studio: Van Gelder Studio, Englewood Cliffs, NJ
- Genre: Jazz
- Length: 63:25
- Label: HighNote; HCD 7159
- Producer: Brian Bacchus

Steve Turre chronology
| The Spirits Up Above (2004) | Keep Searchin' (2006) | Rainbow People (2008) |

Keep Searchin' is an album by trombonist Steve Turre recorded in 2006 and released on the HighNote label.

== Reception ==
Professional ratings
Review scores
| Source | Rating |
|---|---|
| All About Jazz | 4/5 stars |
| The Penguin Guide to Jazz Recordings | 3/4 stars |

On All About Jazz, Dan McCleneghan observed "On Keep Searchin' Turre pays tribute to his own musical/life philosophy on a set of forward-looking original (mostly) compositions, performed with a group of stellar musicians ... Turre mixes up the sound with different mutes throughout, and adds, again, the hollow, peacefully haunting timbre of the conch shell on the closing title track. An excellent set by an ever-searching artist".

In JazzTimes, David Whiteis stated "Turre and his bandmates take us on a journey that’s spiritually uplifting, to be sure, but also hard-swinging and, for the most part, ebulliently down-to-earth and joyful".

== Track listing ==
All compositions by Steve Turre except where noted

1. "Sanyas" – 9:13
2. "Faded Beauty" – 6:25
3. "Thandiwa" (Grachan Moncur III) – 5:43
4. "Reconcillation" – 6:50
5. "Time Off" – 4:02
6. "My Funny Valentine" (Richard Rodgers, Lorenz Hart) – 5:40
7. "Easy Now" – 7:45
8. "Steppin' Out" – 4:53
9. "Da Blues" – 5:44
10. "Keep Searchin'" – 7:11

== Personnel ==
- Steve Turre – trombone, shells
- Stefon Harris – vibraphone
- Akua Dixon – baritone violin (tracks 1, 2 & 4)
- Xavier Davis – piano
- Gerald Cannon (tracks 5–9), Peter Washington (tracks 1–4 & 10) – bass
- Dion Parson – drums
