= The Odyssey of Funk & Popular Music =

Studio album by Lester Bowie
- Released: 1998
- Recorded: September 27–October 4, 1997
- Genre: Jazz
- Length: 55:09
- Label: Atlantic
- Producer: Jean-François Deiber

Lester Bowie chronology
The Fire This Time (1992)	The Odyssey of Funk & Popular Music (1998)	When the Spirit Returns (2000)

2002 Reissue Cover

The Odyssey Of Funk & Popular Music (also referred to as Vol. 1) is an album by Lester Bowie's Brass Fantasy, recorded for the Atlantic label in 1997. It is the eighth album by Bowie's Brass Fantasy group, and the final album by Bowie issued in his lifetime. (When The Spirit Returns, recorded at the same sessions, was issued in 2003.) It features performances by Bowie, Vincent Chancey, Gary Valente, Josh Roseman, Louis Bonilla, Ravi Best, Gerald Brezel, Joseph Gollehon, Bob Stewart, Victor See Yuen and Vinnie Johnson.

== Reception ==
The AllMusic review by Richard S. Ginell states, "At the very least, the brasses sound fresh and interested in what they're doing, so there is pleasure to be had here".

Professional ratings
Review scores
Source	Rating
AllMusic	3/5 stars
The Penguin Guide to Jazz Recordings	3/4 stars

== Track listing ==
1. "The Birth of the Blues" (Lew Brown, Buddy DeSylva, Ray Henderson) - 5:49
2. "Next" (Joseph Bowie, Sebastian Piekarek) - 6:05
3. "Two Become One" (Matt Rowebottom, Richard Stannard, Spice Girls) - 6:08
4. "Don't Cry for Me Argentina" (Andrew Lloyd Webber, Tim Rice) - 9:09
5. "Beautiful People" (Marilyn Manson, Twiggy Ramirez) - 6:57
6. "In the Still of the Night" (Fred Parris) - 4:43
7. "Notorious Thugs" (Sean Combs, Anthony Henderson, Steven Howse, Steve Jordan, Bryon McCane, Christopher Wallace) - 5:30
8. "Nessun Dorma" (Giacomo Puccini) - 6:49
9. "If You Don't Know Me by Now" (Harold Melvin, Teddy Pendergrass) - 4:20

- Recorded September 27 – October 4, 1997, at Systems Two Studio, Brooklyn, NY

== Personnel ==
- Lester Bowie: trumpet
- Vincent Chancey: french horn
- Gary Valente: trombone
- Joshua Roseman: trombone
- Luis Bonilla: trombone
- Ravi Best: trumpet
- Gerald Brezel: trumpet
- Joseph "Mac" Gollehon: trumpet
- Bob Stewart: tuba
- Victor See Yuen: percussion
- Vinnie Johnson: drums
