= Karlton Hester =

American musician

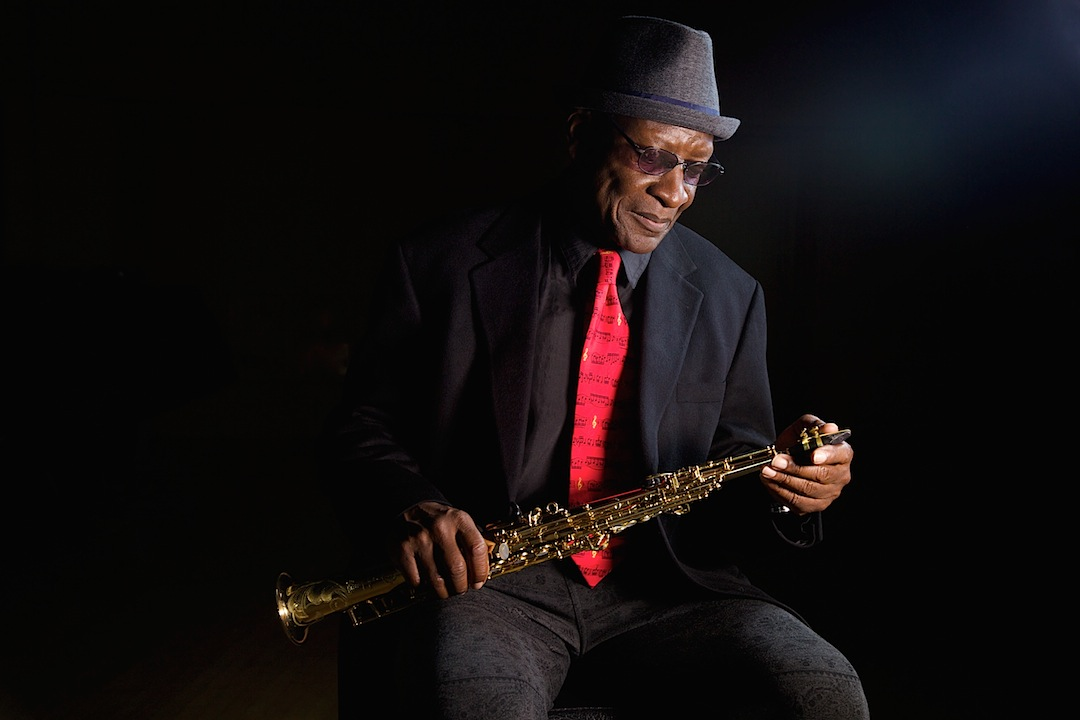

Background information
- Born: February 11, 1949 (age 77); El Paso, Texas, US
- Origin: El Paso
- Genre: Jazz
- Occupations: Musician and Professor
- Instrument: Woodwinds
- Years active: 1970s–present
- Label: Hesteria Records
- Website: karltonhester.com

Karlton Hester (born February 11, 1949) is an American performer, composer, scholar, and educator. He is a professor of music and director of jazz studies at the University of California, Santa Cruz (UCSC). His work encompasses jazz, African music, contemporary and experimental music, improvisation, and electro-acoustic composition. He has also written extensively on jazz history, African music, improvisation, and the relationship between African musical traditions and the development of jazz.

== Early life and education ==
Hester began taking piano lessons with piano teacher Drusilla Nixon and a few years after that, began singing in the El Paso Boys' Choir, founded and directed by the Chair of the music department at Texas Western College, Dr. E.A. Thorsmodsgaard. Hester began learning flute and other wind instruments in the 6th grade, later learning from African American music masters in the Los Angeles community. He studied music at the University of Texas and soon headed to Southern California, where he was employed as a symphonic band, orchestra, marching band, and jazz band director at Eisenhower High School in Rialto, California.

Hester earned his B.M. at University of Texas at El Paso, his M.A. in Music Education from San Francisco State University, and his Ph.D. in composition from the City University of New York Graduate Center. Hester's Ph.D. dissertation is titled "The Melodic and Polyrhythmic Development of John Coltrane's Spontaneous Compositions in a Racist Society," and the music of John Coltrane has been a lasting influence on his work. Hester taught for a decade at Cornell University immediately after graduating.

== Career ==
Hester began his career as a studio musician and music educator in Los Angeles and was the Herbert Gussman Director of Jazz Studies at Cornell University from 1990 to 2000. At Cornell, Hester directed the Traditional and Experimental Lab Ensembles and coordinated university festivals and conferences that included jazz and African artists such as Jaki Byard, John Handy, Joe Henderson, Cecil Taylor, McCoy Tyner, Toshiko Akiyoshi, Stanley Turrentine, Louis Jordan, Buddy Collette, Dr. Donald Byrd, Dr. Billy Taylor, Randy Weston, Charles Lloyd, Geri Allen, Benny Powell, Charles Tolliver, Steve Turre, Sam Rivers, Thomas Mapfumo, George E. Lewis, Roscoe Mitchell, Hotep Galeta, Victor Goines, Akua Dixon, Mamadou Diabate, Samite Mulondo, Cecilia Smith, Phil Bowler, Adela Dalto, Pamela Wise, and Nick Mathis.

Hester set up and directs the San Francisco Fillmore Jazz Preservation Big Band and Hesterian Musicism. He coined the term musicism to “represent the creative process by which musicians, visual artists, and poets, through the merging of composition and performance, produce new art forms.” This interdisciplinary approach is realized in projects such as “Three Bodies” where Hester collaborated with astrophysicist Greg Laughlin and dancer Ted Warburton to create a multimedia performance that offers a “solution” to the three-body problem.

Hester has received composer fellowships, grants, and commissions from the National Endowment of the Arts, New York Foundation for the Arts, New England Council of the Arts, ASCAP, and the William Grant Still Foundation., as well as a 2022 collaborative grant from the National Endowment for the Arts for the "Surge" Afrofuturism Festival. He was the vice president of the International Society for Improvised Music (2008-2018) and is founding director of Interdisciplinary Artists Aggregation, Inc. (1970–present).

Hester is the director and member of the principal faculty for the University of California, Santa Cruz Digital Arts and New Media (DANM) MFA program, and serves as Associate Dean of Diversity, Equity, & Inclusion for the UCSC Arts Division. As one of the organizers of the event entitled “Surge Afrofuturism”, Hester and Dance Professor Gerald Casel won a grant from the National Endowment for their year-long Festival for the academic year 2021-2022. This was Hester's third NEA grant.

Grove Music Online wrote of him "This disciplined spontaneity also informs Hester's later works in the albums Trans-Cultural Musicism (2015) and Quantum Elders Ballet (2019), resulting from collaborating with Japanese, Korean, and Chinese musicians. These albums represent a contribution to transcultural Afrofuturism through a combination of ancient Egyptian symbolism and a hopeful view of the future, and present a post-modern blend of avantgarde, world music, and hip hop. The multi-media work Quantum Elders Consciousness Vaccine (2021) allows for new modes of interaction and artistic expression during the COVID-19 pandemic."

=== Hesterian Musicism ===
Hester developed the concept of Hesterian Musicism, a term associated with his approach to composition and performance. The concept combines spontaneous composition and performance with interdisciplinary collaboration involving music, dance, poetry, visual art, and electronic media.

His compositions include works for solo woodwinds, chamber ensembles, jazz ensembles, and electro-acoustic forces. His work has also incorporated multimedia and interdisciplinary elements.

== Awards ==
Hester is a Gold Medal winner of a Global Music Award for Experimental Jazz in December 2017, for his 2016 album Trans-Cultural Musicism, the Mellon Postdoctoral Fellowship, Cornell University, and the National Endowment for the Arts, composer grant.

== Discography ==
- 1981: Karlton Hester and the Contemporary Jazz Art Movement (Hesteria Records)
- 1982: Hesterian Musicism (Hesteria Records)
- 1988: Dances Purely for the Sake of Love (Hesteria Records)
- 1998: Musicism for the Sake of Love (Hesteria Records)
- 1998: Sacred Musicism (Hesteria Records)
- 1998: Retrospective: Cornell University Lab Ensembles & Guest Artists 1991–1998 (Hesteria Records)
- 1998: Hesterian Liberation (Hesteria Records)
- 1999: Reconstructive Musicism (Hesteria Records)
- 2000: Harmonious Soul Scenes 2000 (Hesteria Records)
- 2006: Musicism for Your Imagination (Hesteria Records)
- 2006: Twenty-first Century Musicism (Hesteria Records)
- 2006: Live at Herbst Theatre with The Fillmore Jazz Preservation Big Band (featuring John Handy and Denise Perrier) (Hesteria Records)
- 2007: Divine Particle's Vision (Hesteria Records)
- 2008: Sixth Sense - Stillness (Hesteria Records/Blue Cliff Records)
- 2015: Trans-cultural Musicism (Hesteria Records)
- 2018: Hip-Hop Hesteria (Hesteria Records)
- 2018: Quantum Elders Ballet (Hesteria Records/Centaur Records)
- 2021: Quantum Elders Consciousness Vaccine (Hesteria Records/Blu-ray video)
- 2022: Quantum Elders Consciousness Vaccine (Centaur Records/CD)
- 2024: Hesterian Ballet – dramatic Operetta (Centaur: CRC4098)

== Books ==
- 1997: The Melodic and Polyrhythmic Development of John Coltrane's Spontaneous Compositions in a Racist Society (Edwin Mellen Press)
- 2000: From Africa to Afrocentric Innovations Some Call "Jazz" (SUNY Press)
- 2009: Bigotry and the Afrocentric Jazz Evolution 4th Edition (Cognella Publishing)
- 2010: Exploratory Musicism: Ideas for Spontaneous Composition (Cognella Publishing)
- 2011: Survey of African Music (Cognella Publishing)
- 2016: African Roots of the Jazz Evolution (Cognella Publishing)
- 2019: Jazz Nucleus of Global Fission (Kendall Hunt Publishing)
