= Serious Fun (Lester Bowie album) =

Studio album by Lester Bowie's Brass Fantasy
- Released: 1989
- Recorded: April 4–6, 1989
- Genre: Jazz
- Length: 54:33
- Label: DIW

Lester Bowie chronology
| Twilight Dreams (1988) | Serious Fun (1989) | My Way (1990) |

Serious Fun is the first album by Lester Bowie recorded for the Japanese DIW label and the fourth album by his "Brass Fantasy" group. It was released in 1989 and features performances by Bowie, Vincent Chancey, Frank Lacy, Steve Turre, E. J. Allen, Gerald Brezel, Stanton Davis, Bob Stewart, Ken Crutchfield, Vinnie Johnson and Famoudou Don Moye.

== Reception ==
The AllMusic review by Scott Yanow stated, "Serious Fun is one of the ensemble's earlier records and the material is better than usual... on this particular project it is mostly quite successful and full of Lester Bowie's wit".

Professional ratings
Review scores
| Source | Rating |
|---|---|
| AllMusic | 4/5 stars |

== Track listing ==
1. "Papa's Got a Brand New Bag" (James Brown) - 4:40
2. "Smooth Operator" (Sade, Ray Saint John) - 6:59
3. "Inflated Tear" (Roland Kirk) - 7:24
4. "Da Butt" (Marcus Miller) - 6:05
5. "God Bless the Child" (Arthur Herzog Jr., Billie Holiday) - 14:59
6. "Don't Worry, Be Happy" (Bobby McFerrin) - 6:32
7. "Strange Fruit" (Lewis Allan) - 7:54

- Recorded at Systems Two, Brooklyn, NY, April 4–6, 1989

== Personnel ==
- Lester Bowie: trumpet
- Vincent Chancey: French horn
- Frank Lacy: trombone, vocals
- Steve Turre: trombone
- E. J. Allen: trumpet
- Gerald Brezel: trumpet
- Stanton Davis: trumpet, flugelhorn
- Bob Stewart: tuba
- Famoudou Don Moye: percussion
- Ken Crutchfield: drums
- Vinnie Johnson: drums
