= Rainbow People (album) =

Studio album by Steve Turre
- Released: May 6, 2008
- Recorded: December 6 & 7, 2007
- Studio: Knoop Studios, River Edge, NJ
- Genre: Jazz
- Length: 65:06
- Label: HighNote; HCD 7181
- Producer: Steve Turre

Steve Turre chronology
Keep Searchin' (2006)	Rainbow People (2008)	Spiritman: The Smoke Sessions (2009)

Rainbow People is an album by trombonist Steve Turre recorded in 2007 and released on the HighNote label the following year.

== Reception ==
Professional ratings
Review scores
Source	Rating
AllMusic	4.5/5 stars
All About Jazz	4/5 stars

The AllMusic review by Thom Jurek said the album "may be the finest offering of his career as a leader" and noted "his compositions here are startlingly fresh, wildly and cleverly inventive, and full of warmth and humor. His arrangements for this band are his new watermark".

On All About Jazz, Ian Patterson called it "a classy and deceptively leisurely session which finds Turre in sparkling form" and observed "The blues is at the heart of Rainbow People and the songs are like a heartfelt, mellow incantation—gospel praise to guiding lights. Classy, sophisticated, and soulful".

In JazzTimes, Bill Milkowski called it "a set of exhilarating originals and two well-chosen covers" and stated "In an age where young trombonists seem more attracted to the multiphonic experiments of players like Albert Mangelsdorff, Turre is decidedly old school, still out there waving the flag for bop elders like J.J. Johnson, Curtis Fuller and Slide Hampton".

== Track listing ==
All compositions by Steve Turre except where noted

1. "Rainbow People" – 8:40
2. "Forward Vision" – 5:59
3. "Brother Ray" – 9:04
4. "Groove Blues" – 5:51
5. "Midnight in Madrid" – 8:47
6. "Cleopatra's Needle" (Steve Kirby) – 4:12
7. "Search for Peace" (McCoy Tyner) – 8:15
8. "Segment" (Charlie Parker) – 5:29
9. "Para el Comandante" – 8:49

== Personnel ==
- Steve Turre – trombone, shells
- Kenny Garrett – alto saxophone, soprano saxophone (tracks 1, 4, 8 & 9)
- Sean Jones - trumpet, flugelhorn (tracks 2, 5 & 9)
- Mulgrew Miller – piano
- Peter Washington - bass
- Ignacio Berroa – drums
- Pedro Martínez – percussion (track 9)
