= The Voice of the Saxophone =

Studio album by Don Braden
- Released: 1997
- Recorded: 1997
- Genre: Jazz
- Label: RCA Victor
- Producer: Don Braden, Benny Golson

Don Braden chronology
The Open Road (1996)	The Voice of the Saxophone (1997)	The Fire Within (1999)

The Voice of the Saxophone is an album by the American saxophonist Don Braden, released in 1997. It was his first album for RCA Victor. Braden supported it with a North American tour. "Monk's Hat" was used as the theme to the television series Cosby; Bill Cosby played timbales and cowbell on the track.

== Production ==
Recorded in 1997, the album was produced by Braden and Benny Golson. Braden wrote the arrangements for an octet. He was backed by trombonist Frank Lacy, saxophonist Vincent Herring, trumpeter Randy Brecker, and saxophonist Hamiet Bluiett, among others. The album takes its title from the Jimmy Heath song. "After the Rain" is a version of the John Coltrane song. "Soul Station" was written and originally performed by Hank Mobley. "Point of Many Returns" is an interpretation of the Sam Rivers composition. "Speak No Evil" was written by Wayne Shorter.

== Critical reception ==
Professional ratings
Review scores
Source	Rating
AllMusic	2.5/5 stars
MusicHound Jazz: The Essential Album Guide	3.5/5 stars
The Penguin Guide to Jazz on CD	3.5/4 stars

The Boston Herald stated, "Possessed of a great big sound, tons of soul and chops that also encompass writing, arranging and bandleading, Braden and his octet make The Voice of the Saxophone the rollicking kind of little-big-band date you rarely hear any more." The Guardian noted that "Braden's canny arrangements don't try to recreate the original mood and his own solos, based around a warm, slightly cloudy sound and never flashy, are a pleasure to hear." Jazziz opined, "On a program that inferred scholarship by tracing the lineage of his chosen horn, he moved from Mobley to Rivers, stressing erudition at each turn. But it was formal to a fault—the music just kind of sat there." JazzTimes said that "Braden scored his original 'Cozy' for two flutes, clarinet and fluegelhorn to achieve the CD’s little masterwork."

== Track listing ==
No.	Title	Length
1.	"Soul Station"
2.	"Speak No Evil"
3.	"Winelight"
4.	"After the Rain"
5.	"The Dust Kicker"
6.	"Monk's Hat"
7.	"Cozy"
8.	"The Face I Love"
9.	"Point of Many Returns"
10.	"The Voice of the Saxophone"
