= I Only Have Eyes for You (Lester Bowie album) =

Studio album by Lester Bowie's Brass Fantasy
- Released: 1985
- Recorded: February 1985
- Genre: Jazz
- Length: 53:09
- Label: ECM 1296
- Producer: Manfred Eicher

Lester Bowie chronology
All the Magic (1982)	I Only Have Eyes for You (1985)	Duet (1985)

I Only Have Eyes for You is an album by Lester Bowie's Brass Fantasy, recorded in February 1985 and released on ECM the following year—Bowie's third release for the label, and the Brass Fantasy's debut. The ensemble features Vincent Chancey, Craig Harris, Steve Turre, Malachi Thompson, Stanton Davis, Bob Stewart, Bruce Purse, and Phillip Wilson.

== Reception ==
The AllMusic review by Scott Yanow stated, "The music is both whimsical and explorative, making for a colorful set."

Professional ratings
Review scores
Source	Rating
AllMusic	3/5 stars
The Penguin Guide to Jazz Recordings	2.5/4 stars

== Track listing ==
All compositions by Lester Bowie except as indicated

1. "I Only Have Eyes for You" (Al Dubin, Harry Warren) - 10:32
2. "Think" (Bruce Purse) - 1:31
3. "Lament" (Thompson) - 13:55
4. "Coming Back, Jamaica" - 5:17
5. "Nonet" (Stewart) - 14:32
6. "When the Spirit Returns" - 7:44

== Personnel ==
Lester Bowie's Brass Fantasy

- Lester Bowie – trumpet
- Vincent Chancey – French horn
- Craig Harris – trombone
- Steve Turre – trombone
- Malachi Thompson – trumpet
- Stanton Davis – trumpet, flugelhorn
- Bob Stewart – tuba
- Bruce Purse – trumpet
- Phillip Wilson – drums
