= After Dark (Don Braden album) =

Studio album by Don Braden
- Released: 1994
- Recorded: January 5, 1993
- Genre: Jazz
- Length: 64:56
- Label: Criss Cross Jazz
- Producer: Gerry Teekens

Don Braden chronology
Wish List (1991)	After Dark (1994)	Landing Zone (1995)

After Dark is a 1994 studio album by the American jazz tenor saxophonist Don Braden. Released on the Criss Cross Jazz label, the album presents a recording taken in New York City on January 5, 1993. Critically well received, After Dark is listed as one of the "Core Collection" albums in The Penguin Guide to Jazz.

== Theme ==
Recorded in New York City on January 5, 1993, the album is centered on the theme of night time, with a mix of original compositions and jazz standards as well as one pop song by Stevie Wonder. The music critic Howard Reich suggested that Braden's goal was not to set out specific vignettes, but to "evoke different states of mind that the night inspires."

== Critical reception ==
Professional ratings
Review scores
Source	Rating
AllMusic	4.5/5 stars
The Penguin Guide to Jazz	4/4 stars

The album has been critically well received. The Penguin Guide to Jazz numbers it among the "core collection" which jazz fans should possess. AllMusic describes it as one of the best releases of the year and adds that the album is "a positive step in Braden's rapid development." In its review of the album, JazzTimes wrote that Braden was a "magnetic player" and a "convincing composer", describing the album overall as "a very satisfying follow-up to Braden's previous Criss Cross dates". Reich, in the Chicago Tribune, wrote that the album was "a strong performance from an up-and-coming talent", "a musically appealing and intellectually intriguing recording."

== Track listing ==
1. "After Dark" (Don Braden) – 6:44
2. "Night" (Braden) – 6:46
3. "You and the Night and the Music" (Howard Dietz, Arthur Schwartz) – 6:38
4. "Creepin'" (Stevie Wonder) – 7:16
5. "R.E.M." (Braden) – 5:54
6. "Stars Fell on Alabama" (Frank Perkins) – 8:03
7. "Monk's Dream" (Thelonious Monk) – 7:56
8. "Dawn" (Braden) – 6:04
9. "The Hang" (Braden) – 9:35

== Personnel ==
- Carl Allen – drums, piano
- Bob Bernotas – liner notes
- Noah Bless – trombone
- Don Braden – arranger, flute, tenor saxophone
- Darrell Grant – piano
- Christian McBride – double bass
- Gerry Teekens – producer
- Scott Wendholt – flugelhorn, trumpet
- Steve Wilson – alto saxophone
