= South of the Border (David Murray album) =

Studio album by David Murray Big Band
- Released: 1993
- Recorded: May 23–25, 1992
- Genre: Jazz
- Length: 58:29
- Label: DIW
- Producer: Kazunori Sugiyama

David Murray Big Band chronology
Ballads for Bass Clarinet (1993)	South of the Border (1993)	Picasso (1993)

South of the Border is an album by the David Murray Big Band released on the Japanese DIW label. Recorded in 1992 and released in 1993 the album features performances by Murray, Rasul Siddik, James Zoller, Hugh Ragin, Craig Harris, Frank Lacy, Al Patterson, Vincent Chancey, Kalil Henry, John Purcell, Patience Higgins, Don Byron, Sonelius Smith, Fred Hopkins, Tani Tabbal, and Larry McDonald, conducted by Lawrence "Butch" Morris.

== Reception ==
The Allmusic review awarded the album 3 stars.

Professional ratings
Review scores
Source	Rating
Allmusic	3/5 stars

== Track listing ==
1. "St. Thomas" (Rollins) – 6:35
2. "Happy Birthday Wayne, Jr." (Francis) – 12:19
3. "Awakening Ancestors" (Craig Harris) – 7:09
4. "Calle Estrella" (Francis) 7:55
5. "World Of The Children" (Smith) – 7:29
6. "Fling" (Morris) – 6:18
7. "Flowers For Albert" (Murray) – 10:44
- Recorded May 23, 24 & 25, 1992, NYC

== Personnel ==
- David Murray – tenor saxophone, bass clarinet
- Rasul Siddik – trumpet
- James Zoller – trumpet
- Hugh Ragin – trumpet
- Craig Harris – trombone
- Frank Lacy – trombone
- Al Patterson – trombone
- Vincent Chancey – flugelhorn
- Kalil Henry – flute
- John Purcell – alto saxophone
- Patience Higgins – tenor saxophone, soprano saxophone
- Don Byron – clarinet, bassoon
- Sonelius Smith – piano
- Fred Hopkins – bass
- Tani Tabbal – drums
- Larry McDonald – percussion
- Lawrence "Butch" Morris – conductor
