= Deadline (band) =

Electronic music collective

- Genres: Electronic; jazz fusion; dub
- Years active: 1985–1991
- Label: Celluloid
- Past members: Michael Beinhorn; Aïyb Dieng; Jonas Hellborg; Bill Laswell; Fred Maher; Robert Quine; Phillip Wilson; Bernie Worrell

Deadline was an electronic music collective with an ever rotating line-up. The core of the group was bassist Bill Laswell and drummer Phillip Wilson for their first album and Laswell and Jonas Hellborg for their second. Artists such as Aïyb Dieng, Michael Beinhorn, Bernie Worrell, Fred Maher, Robert Quine also made contributions to the project.

== History ==
Deadline began as a collaboration between composer Bill Laswell of Material and jazz drummer Phillip Wilson of Art Ensemble of Chicago. Their debut album, Down by Law, was issued in May 1985 through Celluloid Records. It was a combination of industrial beats and live percussion with African and Western funk influences. A touring band comprising Laswell and Wilson alongside Michael Beinhorn, Fred Maher and Robert Quine was established but fell apart after only a handful of gigs. The techno leaning Dissident was released in 1991 and featured a different cast of players, with Jonas Hellborg as the main composer and Aïyb Dieng, Bill Laswell and Bernie Worrell the only returning contributors.

== Discography ==
Studio albums

- Down by Law (Celluloid, 1985)
- Dissident (Day Eight, 1991)
