= My Way (Lester Bowie album) =

Studio album by Lester Bowie's Brass Fantasy
- Released: 1990
- Recorded: January 22–30, 1990
- Genre: Jazz
- Length: 47:04
- Label: DIW

Lester Bowie chronology
Serious Fun (1989)	My Way (1990)	Live at the 6th Tokyo Music Joy (1991)

My Way is the second album Lester Bowie recorded for the Japanese DIW label and the fifth album by his "Brass Fantasy" group. It was released in 1990 and features performances by Bowie, Gregory Williams, Frank Lacy, Steve Turre, E. J. Allen, Gerald Brezel, Earl Garner, Stanton Davis, Bob Stewart, Ken Crutchfield, Vinnie Johnson and Famoudou Don Moye.

== Reception ==
The Allmusic review by Scott Yanow awarded the album 2½ stars, stating, "this set certainly has its interesting moments, although it is a bit erratic".

Professional ratings
Review scores
Source	Rating
Allmusic	2.5/5 stars

== Track listing ==
1. "Quasi" (Bruce Purse) - 8:30
2. "Who Says" (Turre) - 7:30
3. "After Thought" (Purse) - 9:53
4. "My Way" (Paul Anka, Claude François, Jacques Revaux, Gilles Thibault) - 10:17
5. "I Got You (I Feel Good)" (James Brown) - 6:09
6. "Honky Tonk" (Billy Butler, Bill Doggett, Clifford Scott, Berisford "Shep" Shepherd) - 4:45
- Recorded at Systems Two, Brooklyn, NY on 22, 24, 25, 26 & 30 January 1990

== Personnel ==
- Lester Bowie: trumpet, flugelhorn
- Gregory Williams: French horn
- Frank Lacy: trombone, vocals
- Steve Turre: trombone, conch shell
- E. J. Allen: trumpet
- Gerald Brezel: trumpet
- Earl Garner: trumpet
- Stanton Davis: trumpet, piccolo trumpet
- Bob Stewart: tuba
- Famoudou Don Moye: percussion
- Ken Crutchfield: drums
- Vinnie Johnson: drums
