= When the Spirit Returns =

Studio album by Lester Bowie
- Released: 2000
- Recorded: 1997
- Genre: Jazz
- Label: Birdology
- Producer: Lester Bowie, Jean François Deiber

Lester Bowie chronology
The Odyssey of Funk & Popular Music (1999)	When the Spirit Returns (2000)

When the Spirit Returns is the final album by the American trumpeter Lester Bowie, released in 2000. He was backed by his band, Brass Fantasy. The album was reissued in October 2003.

== Production ==
When the Spirit Returns was recorded at Bowie's home studio during the same 1997 sessions that led to The Odyssey of Funk & Popular Music. Gary Valente played trombone on the album. Many of the songs were chosen by Bowie's daughter, who was 15 at the time. "One Love" is a cover of the Bob Marley song. "Count On Me" was written by Babyface. "Unchained Melody" is a take on the Al Hibbler version of the standard. "Waterfall" is a cover of the TLC song. Bowie composed the ending title track.

== Critical reception ==
Professional ratings
Review scores
Source	Rating
AllMusic	4.5/5 stars
The Encyclopedia of Popular Music	2/5 stars
The Penguin Guide to Jazz on CD	2.5/4 stars
The Philadelphia Inquirer	3.5/4 stars

The Independent said that the songs "are given the widescreen Bowie treatment, with fat brass licks and plangent harmonies delivered over a tuba-driven pulse that is most effective." The Jerusalem Post noted that "the most striking feature of Bowie's work was his ability to lace even the most amorphous material with tongue-in-cheek humor."

Jazziz opined that "the best cuts combine blaring horns with a thick bassline (played on a tuba) and could be the greatest blaxploitation soundtrack ever—if a movie could be made that was worthy of the music." Goldmine called the album a "collection of outrageous cuts", stating that Bowie had been "the joker" of the Art Ensemble of Chicago. The Philadelphia Inquirer stated that Bowie "easily spins through jazz, soul and reggae with great zest, humor and veritas."

AllMusic labeled When the Spirit Returns "a fitting final project, and easily the most consistent and realized of all the Brass Fantasy albums."

== Track listing ==
No.	Title	Length
1.	"Player Hater"
2.	"Waterfall"
3.	"Count On Me"
4.	"Solitude"
5.	"Biggie's Ride"
6.	"One Love"
7.	"Unchained Melody"
8.	"Naakurat Na"
9.	"Save the Best for Last"
10.	"When the Spirit Returns"
