= MX (album) =

Studio album by David Murray
- Released: 1993
- Recorded: September 25, 1992
- Genre: Jazz
- Length: 60:51
- Label: Red Baron
- Producer: Bob Thiele

David Murray chronology
Picasso (1993)	MX (1993)	The Jazzpar Prize (1993)

MX is an album by David Murray, released on the Red Baron label in 1993. It features performances by Murray, Ravi Coltrane, Bobby Bradford, John Hicks, Fred Hopkins and Victor Lewis. The album is dedicated to the memory of Malcolm X.

== Reception ==
Professional ratings
Review scores
Source	Rating
AllMusic	4.5/5 stars
The Penguin Guide to Jazz	3.5/4 stars
The Virgin Encyclopedia of Jazz	3/5 stars

The AllMusic review awarded the album 4.5 stars.

== Track listing ==
1. "MX" (Osser, Theile) - 5:19
2. "Icarus" - 8:29
3. "El Hajj Malik El-Shabazz" - 8:24
4. "A Dream Deferred" (Osser, Thiele) - 6:52
5. "Blues for X" (Osser, Thiele) - 13:08
6. "Hicks Time" (Hicks) - 10:22
7. "Harlemite" - 8:17

All compositions by David Murray except as indicated
- Recorded September 25, 1992, NYC

== Personnel ==
- David Murray - tenor saxophone
- Ravi Coltrane - tenor saxophone
- Bobby Bradford - cornet
- John Hicks - piano
- Fred Hopkins - bass
- Victor Lewis - drums
