= Dissident (album) =

Studio album by Deadline
- Released: 1991
- Recorded: Greenpoint Studio, Brooklyn, NY; Platinum Island Studios, NYC
- Genre: Electronic
- Length: 36:28
- Label: Day Eight
- Producer: Jonas Hellborg, Bill Laswell

Deadline chronology
Down by Law (1985)	Dissident (1991)

Professional ratings
Review scores
Source	Rating
Allmusic	4/5 stars

Dissident is the second studio album by Deadline, released in 1991 by Day Eight Music.

== Track listing ==
No.	Title	Writer(s)	Length
1.	"Who's Who"	Jonas Hellborg	4:39
2.	"Black Swans"	Jonas Hellborg, Jens Johansson, Bill Laswell, Nicky Skopelitis	5:53
3.	"World Disorder"	Jonas Hellborg	4:50
4.	"Refrain"	Jonas Hellborg	5:17
5.	"Heart of Darkness"	Jonas Hellborg, Bill Laswell, Nicky Skopelitis	5:37
6.	"The Stone That Speaks"	Jonas Hellborg, Bill Laswell, Nicky Skopelitis	5:29
7.	"Broken Edge"	Jonas Hellborg, Bill Laswell	4:39

== Personnel ==
Musicians

- Bootsy Collins – bass guitar
- Aïyb Dieng – percussion
- Jonas Hellborg – bass guitar, producer
- Jens Johansson – keyboards
- Bill Laswell – bass guitar, co-producer
- Nicky Skopelitis – Fairlight CMI
- Bernie Worrell – keyboards

Technical personnel

- Oz Fritz – mixing, recording
- Robert Musso – recording
- Howie Weinberg – mastering

== Release history ==
Region	Date	Label	Format	Catalog
Germany	1991	Day Eight	CD	DEMCD 027
Japan	1992	Jimco	CD	JICK-89044
