= Vincent Chancey =

American jazz hornist

- Born: February 4, 1950 (age 75); Chicago, Illinois, U.S.
- Genres: Jazz
- Instruments: French horn

Vincent Chancey (born February 4, 1950) is an American jazz hornist.

== Early life and education ==
Chancey was born and raised in Chicago. He earned a Bachelor of Arts degree in music from the SIUC School of Music in 1973 and studied under Julius Watkins in New York City.

== Career ==
Chancey began playing professionally in the 1970s, mostly with large ensembles such as the Sun Ra Arkestra, Lester Bowie's Brass Fantasy, David Murray Big Band, Carla Bley Big Band, and the Richard Abrams orchestra. He later performed and recorded with the Mingus Orchestra, Dave Douglas, Wayne Shorter, Herbie Hancock, Shirley Horn, Diana Krall, Elvis Costello, Mose Allison, Aretha Franklin, and Cassandra Wilson.

== Discography ==
=== As leader ===
- Welcome Mr. Chancey (1993)
- Next Mode (1998, DIW Records)

=== As sideman ===
With Ahmed Abdullah

- Life's Force (About Time, 1979)
- Live at Ali's Alley (Cadence, 1980)

With Muhal Richard Abrams

- Mama and Daddy (Black Saint, 1980)
- Blues Forever (Black Saint, 1982)
- Rejoicing with the Light (Black Saint, 1983)

With Carla Bley

- Live! (Watt, 1981)
- I Hate to Sing (Watt, 1981–83)

With Lester Bowie

- I Only have Eyes for You (ECM, 1985)
- Avant Pop (ECM, 1986)
- Twilight Dreams (Venture, 1988)
- Serious Fun (DIW, 1989)
- Live at the 6th Tokyo Music Joy (DIW, 1990)
- The Fire This Time (In & Out, 1992)
- The Odyssey Of Funk & Popular Music (Atlantic, 1998)

With Dave Douglas

- Spirit Moves (Greenleaf, 2009)
- United Front: Brass Ecstasy at Newport (Greenleaf, 2011)
- Rare Metal (Greenleaf, 2011)

With Charlie Haden Liberation Music Orchestra

- Time/Life (Impulse!, 2011-2015 [2016])

With David Murray

- Live at Sweet Basil Volume 1 (Black Saint, 1984)
- Live at Sweet Basil Volume 2 (Black Saint, 1984)
- David Murray Big Band (DIW/Columbia, 1991)
- South of the Border (DIW, 1993)

With Herb Robertson

- Shades of Bud Powell (JMT, 1988)

With Sun Ra

- Live at Montreux (Inner City, 1976)
- Cosmos (Cobra, 1976)
- Unity (Horo, 1977)
- Sleeping Beauty (El Saturn, 1979)
- Live from Soundscape (DIW, 1979)
