= Funky T. Cool T. =

Album by Lester Bowie

Studio album by Lester Bowie's New York Organ Ensemble
- Released: 1991
- Recorded: January 14–16, 1991
- Genre: Jazz
- Length: 47:51
- Label: DIW

Lester Bowie chronology
The Organizer (1991)	Funky T. Cool T. (1991)	The Fire This Time (1992)

Funky T. Cool T. is the fifth album Lester Bowie recorded for the Japanese DIW label and the second album by his "New York Organ Ensemble". It was released in 1991 and features performances by Bowie, Steve Turre, Amina Claudine Myers James Carter, Phillip Wilson and Famoudou Don Moye.

== Reception ==
The Allmusic review by Don Snowden awarded the album 2½ stars stating "it really seems like Lester Bowie threw this group away -- too bad, because the combination of his sensibility, this genre, and these players had a lot of potential".

Professional ratings
Review scores
Source	Rating
Allmusic	2.5/5 stars

== Track listing ==
1. "Funky T." (Turre) - 8:04
2. "What's New?" (Burke, Haggart) - 9:05
3. "When the Spirit Returns" - 9:16
4. "Cool T." - 10:42
5. "Afternoon in Brooklyn" - 10:57

All compositions by Lester Bowie except as indicated

- Recorded at Systems Two, Brooklyn, NY on 14, 15 & 16 January 1991

== Personnel ==
- Lester Bowie: trumpet, flugelhorn
- Steve Turre: trombone
- Amina Claudine Myers: organ, vocals
- James Carter: tenor saxophone
- Famoudou Don Moye: drums, percussion
- Phillip Wilson: drums
