= Live at the 6th Tokyo Music Joy =

Live album by Art Ensemble of Chicago & Lester Bowie's Brass Fantasy
- Released: 1990
- Recorded: February 14, 1990
- Genre: Jazz
- Label: DIW

Art Ensemble of Chicago chronology
Dreaming of the Masters Suite (1990)	Live at the 6th Tokyo Music Joy (1990)	Fundamental Destiny (1991)

Lester Bowie chronology
My Way (1990)	Live at the 6th Tokyo Music Joy (1990)	The Organizer (1991)

Live at the 6th Tokyo Music Joy is a live album by the Art Ensemble of Chicago and Lester Bowie's Brass Fantasy recorded in February 1990 for the Japanese DIW label. It is the only recording to showcase both of the groups that Lester Bowie established and features performances by the Art Ensemble (tracks 1–3), the Brass Fantasy (tracks 4–6) and both bands (tracks 7–10).

== Reception ==
The AllMusic review awarded the album 4½ stars.

The Penguin Guide to Jazz calls the album "A celebratory meeting but not a great one".

Professional ratings
Review scores
Source	Rating
AllMusic	4.5/5 stars

== Track listing ==
1. "Yobu-Sun" (Moye) - 4:35
2. "Ride the Line" (Favors) - 3:57
3. "Song for Atala" (Mitchell) - 2:49
4. "Night Time (Is the Right Time)" (Herman) - 3:04
5. "Good Morning Heartache" (Drake, Fisher, Higginbotham) - 8:34
6. "The Music of the Night" (Hart, Lloyd Webber, Stilgoe) - 7:13
7. "The Emperor" (Turre) - 13:45
8. "Variations" (Mitchell) - 9:07
9. "A Jackson in Your House" (Mitchell) - 4:50
10. "The Great Pretender" (Ram) - 3:10

- Recorded live at the Tokyo Music Joy '90 at Showa Women's University Hitomi Memorial Hall, Tokyo, Japan on 14 February 1990

== Personnel ==
- Lester Bowie: trumpet, percussion
- Malachi Favors Maghostut: bass, percussion (tracks: 1–3 & 7–10)
- Roscoe Mitchell: soprano saxophone, alto saxophone, tenor saxophone, baritone saxophone, clarinet, flute, percussion (tracks: 1–3 & 7–10)
- Joseph Jarman: soprano saxophone, alto saxophone, tenor saxophone, synthesizer, clarinet, flute, percussion (tracks: 1–3 & 7–10)
- Famoudou Don Moye: drums, percussion (tracks: 1–3 & 7–10)
- Vincent Chancey: French horn (tracks: 4–10)
- Clifton Anderson: trombone (tracks: 4–10)
- Steve Turre: trombone, conch shell (tracks: 4–10)
- E. J. Allen: trumpet (tracks: 4–10)
- Gerald Brezel: trumpet (tracks: 4–10)
- Stanton Davis: trumpet, piccolo trumpet (tracks: 4–10)
- Bob Stewart: tuba (tracks: 4–10)
- Vinnie Johnson: drums (tracks: 4–10)
