= Low Class Conspiracy =

Studio album by David Murray
- Released: 1976
- Recorded: May 14, 1976, and June 29, 1976, Studio Rivbea and Blue Rock Studio, NYC
- Genre: Jazz
- Length: 38:44
- Label: Adelphi AD 5002
- Producer: Michael Cuscuna

David Murray chronology
| Low Class Conspiracy (1976) | Flowers for Albert (1976) |

Low Class Conspiracy is the debut album by David Murray, released on the Adelphi label in 1976.

== Reception ==
The AllMusic review by Scott Yanow stated, "At 21, Murray already had remarkable technique and these explorations with bassist Fred Hopkins and drummer Phillip Wilson are quite adventurous... None of the compositions themselves are that memorable and some listeners may find Murray's screams and screeches (which he would modify a bit in later years) to be a bit too emotional, but this was a strong first effort."

Professional ratings
Review scores
| Source | Rating |
|---|---|
| AllMusic | 3/5 stars |
| The Rolling Stone Jazz Record Guide | 4/5 stars |

== Track listing ==
All compositions by David Murray except as indicated.

1. "Extremininity" – 7:30
2. "Dewey's Circle" – 12:22
3. "Low Class Conspiracy" – 9:30
4. "B./T." – 5:13
5. "Dedication to Jimmy Garrison" (Fred Hopkins) – 4:09
- Recorded on May 14, 1976 at Studio Rivbea in New York City (track 1) and June 29, 1976 at Blue Rock Studio, also in New York City (tracks 2–5)

== Personnel ==
- David Murray: tenor saxophone
- Fred Hopkins: bass (tracks 2–5)
- Phillip Wilson: drums (tracks 2–5)
