= The Fire This Time (album) =

Live album by Lester Bowie's Brass Fantasy
- Released: 1992
- Recorded: May 1, 1992
- Genre: Jazz
- Length: 74:30
- Label: In & Out
- Producer: F. Kleinschmidt & J. Schwab

Lester Bowie chronology
Funky T. Cool T. (1992)	The Fire This Time (1992)	The Odyssey Of Funk & Popular Music (1998)

The Fire This Time is a live album by Lester Bowie's Brass Fantasy recorded in Aarburg, Switzerland for the In & Out label. It is the seventh album by Bowie's Brass Fantasy group and features performances by Bowie, Vincent Chancey, Frank Lacy, Louis Bonilla, E. J. Allen, Gerald Brezel, Tony Barrero, Bob Stewart, Vinnie Johnson and Famoudou Don Moye.

== Reception ==
The Allmusic review by Michael G. Nastos awarded the album 4 stars calling it "one of the most important in the Brass Fantasy's history and development".

Professional ratings
Review scores
Source	Rating
Allmusic	4/5 stars

== Track listing ==
1. "Night Time (Is the Right Time)" (Herman) - 2:54
2. "For Louis" (Wilson) - 7:13
3. "Journey Towards Freedom" (Allen) - 10:55
4. "Remember the Time" (Jackson) - 8:32
5. "Strange Fruit" (Allan) - 9:15
6. "Siesta for the Fiesta" (Lunceford) - 4:14
7. "Night Life" (Purse) - 10:29
8. "Black or White" (Jackson) - 7:19
9. "Three for the Festival" (Kirk) - 6:06
10. "The Great Pretender" (Ram) - 7:33

- Recorded live on 1 May 1992 at the Moonwalker Club, Aarburg, Switzerland

== Personnel ==
- Lester Bowie: trumpet
- Vincent Chancey: French horn
- Frank Lacy: trombone
- Luis Bonilla: trombone
- E. J. Allen: trumpet
- Gerald Brezel: trumpet
- Tony Barrero: trumpet
- Bob Stewart: tuba
- Famoudou Don Moye: percussion
- Vinnie Johnson: drums
