= The Organizer (album) =

Studio album by Lester Bowie's New York Organ Ensemble
- Released: 1991
- Recorded: January 14–16, 1991
- Genre: Jazz
- Length: 49:13
- Label: DIW

Lester Bowie chronology
Live at the 6th Tokyo Music Joy (1991)	The Organizer (1991)	Funky T. Cool T. (1992)

The Organizer is the fourth album Lester Bowie recorded for the Japanese DIW label and the first album by his "New York Organ Ensemble". It was released in 1991 and features performances by Bowie, Steve Turre, Amina Claudine Myers James Carter, Phillip Wilson and Famoudou Don Moye.

== Reception ==
The Allmusic review by Al Campbell awarded the album 3 stars stating "In 1991, while on hiatus from the Art Ensemble of Chicago and Lester Bowie's Brass Fantasy, the trumpeter revisited his organ roots. He wisely matched the soulful, gospel influences of organist Amina Claudine Myers and the exhilarating tenor powerhouse James Carter with trombonist Steve Turre and drummers (fellow AEC members past and present) Famoudou Don Moye and Phillip Wilson, making for invigorating yet reverent sessions".

Professional ratings
Review scores
Source	Rating
Allmusic	3/5 stars

== Track listing ==
1. "Sonala Nobala" (Turre) - 5:43
2. "Angel Eyes" (Brent, Dennis) - 11:21
3. "The Burglar" - 9:55
4. "Guten Morgen Part 2" (Myers) - 5:27
5. "Ready Joe" - 8:04
6. "Brooklyn Works Suite" - 8:43

All compositions by Lester Bowie except as indicated
- Recorded at Systems Two, Brooklyn, NY on 14, 15 & 16 January 1991

== Personnel ==
- Lester Bowie: trumpet, flugelhorn
- Steve Turre: trombone
- Amina Claudine Myers: organ, vocals
- James Carter: tenor saxophone
- Famoudou Don Moye: drums (tracks: 1, 3 & 5), percussion (tracks: 2, 4 & 6)
- Phillip Wilson: drums (tracks: 2, 4 & 6)
