= Phillip Wilson =

American drummer

- Born: Phillip Sanford Wilson; September 8, 1941; St. Louis, Missouri, U.S.
- Died: March 25, 1992 (aged 50) New York City, U.S.
- Genres: Jazz, free jazz, blues, funk, R&B
- Occupation: Musician
- Instruments: drums, percussion
- Years active: 1960–1992

Phillip Sanford Wilson (September 8, 1941 – March 25, 1992) was an American blues and jazz drummer, a founding member of the Art Ensemble of Chicago, and a member of the Paul Butterfield Blues Band.

== Biography ==
Born in St. Louis, Missouri, United States, Phillip Wilson was a third generation musician. His grandfather, Ira Kimball, was a percussionist playing on the riverboats that traveled down the Mississippi from St Louis to New Orleans. His recording debut was with Sam Lazar, noted for having one of the first interracial bands in the St. Louis area. After moving to Chicago, Illinois, he became a member of the Association for the Advancement of Creative Musicians AACM and performed with the Art Ensemble of Chicago.

He joined up with the Paul Butterfield Blues Band in 1967 at a time when the band membership changed greatly, including an added horn section. He recorded three albums with the group. Wilson's song "Love March", written with Gene Dinwiddie, was performed at Woodstock and released in 1970 on the live album from the festival.

Wilson, along with Dinwiddie and fellow former Butterfield Band member Buzz Feiten, formed the jazz-rock band Full Moon in the early 1970s. They recorded a self-titled album which is considered one of the finest early examples of jazz fusion. Wilson was part of the loft jazz scene in 1970s New York, worked as a session musician for Stax Records in Memphis and with Jimi Hendrix at the Cafe Au Go Go and Generation Club in 1968, and recorded with The Last Poets, Fontella Bass, Olu Dara, David Murray, Anthony Braxton, Carla Bley and many others. During the 1980s, he worked extensively with Lester Bowie. In 1985, he and Bill Laswell co-produced the album Down by Law under the group name Deadline. Near the end of his life, he was actively pursuing his music career and had been performing regularly at Manhattan's Lower East Side hot spot Deanna's.

Wilson was stalked and murdered in New York City on March 25, 1992. As a result of the America's Most Wanted television program, Marvin Slater was arrested and later convicted, in 1997 for premeditated murder, and sentenced to 33 1/3 years in state prison. The motive for this murder was not revealed during the trial and is still unknown.

== Discography ==
=== As leader ===
- Full Moon with Full Moon (Douglas, 1972)
- Phillip Wilson Quartet, Live at Moers Festival (Moers, 1978)
- Phillip Wilson Trio Live With Leo Smith and Johnny Dyani, Fruits (Circle Records, 1978)
- Duet with Lester Bowie (Improvising Artists, 1978)
- Esoteric with Olu Dara (Hat Hut, 1979)
- Down by Law with Deadline (Celluloid, 1985)

=== As backing musician ===
With The Art Ensemble

- 1967/68 (Nessa, 1993)

The Rance Allen Group

- A Soulful Experience (Stax Records, 1975)

With Martha Bass, Fontella Bass, David Pearson

- From the Root to the Source (Soul Note, 1980)

With Carla Bley

- Amarillo World Headquarters Austin Texas March 27. 1978 (Hat Hut, 2018)

With Hamiet Bluiett

- Endangered Species (India Navigation, 1976)

With Lester Bowie

- Hello Dolly (Muse Records, 1974)
- African Children (Horo, 1978)
- The 5th Power (Black Saint, 1978)
- The Great Pretender (ECM, 1981)
- All the Magic (ECM, 1983)
- I Only Have Eyes for You (ECM, 1985)
- Avant Pop (ECM, 1986)
- Twilight Dreams (Venture, 1987)
- The Organizer (DIW, 1991)
- Funky T. Cool T. (DIW, 1991)

With Anthony Braxton

- Town Hall 1972 (Trio, 1972)
- Creative Orchestra Music 1976 (Arista, 1976)

With Paul Butterfield

- The Resurrection of Pigboy Crabshaw (1967)
- In My Own Dream (1968)
- Keep on Moving (1969)
- Woodstock: Music from the Original Soundtrack and More (1970)

With James Newton

- Paso Del Mar (Indian Navigation Company, 1978)
- Portraits (Indian Navigation Company, 1982)

With John Carter

- John Carter Quintet (Moers Music)

With Julius Hemphill

- Dogon A. D. (Freedom, 1972)
- Coon Bid'ness (Freedom, 1975)
- The Boyé Multi-National Crusade for Harmony (New World, 2021)

With Peter Kuhn

- Ghost Of A Trance (Hat Hut Records, 1981)

With Sam Lazar

- Playback (Argo, 1962)

With Lightnin' Rod

- Hustlers Convention (Celluloid, 1973)

With Frank Lowe

- The Frank Lowe Orchestra, Lowe and Behold, (Musicworks, 1977)
- Frank Lowe & The Saxemple, Inappropriate Choices, (ITM, 1991)
- Out of Nowhere (Ecstatic Peace, 1993)

With Bugsy Maugh

- Bugsy (Dot Records,1969)

With Roscoe Mitchell

- Old/Quartet (Nessa, 1967)

With David Murray

- Low Class Conspiracy (Adelphi, 1976)
- Flowers for Albert: The Complete Concert (India Navigation, 1975)
- Live at the Lower Manhattan Ocean Club (India Navigation, 1977)

With Juma Sultan's Aboriginal Music Society

- Father of Origin (Eremite, 2011) recorded in 1970–1971
