= The Fire Within (Don Braden album) =

Studio album by Don Braden
- Released: 1999
- Genre: Jazz
- Label: RCA Victor
- Producer: Don Braden

Don Braden chronology
The Voice of the Saxophone (1997)	The Fire Within (1999)	Contemporary Standards Ensemble (2000)

The Fire Within is an album by the American saxophonist Don Braden, released in 1999. Braden supported the album with shows in the United States and Britain.

== Production ==
Braden recorded the album with three different bands. Kenny Kirkland intended to play with one of the bands but died before the recording sessions; instead of replacing Kirkland's piano, Braden chose to record the planned songs with just himself, bassist Christian McBride, and drummer Jeff "Tain" Watts. Dwayne Burno played bass on some of the other tracks. Braden composed the title track. "Solar" is an interpretation of the Miles Davis song. "Fried Bananas" is a version of the Dexter Gordon tune; "Thermo" was written by Freddie Hubbard.

== Critical reception ==
Professional ratings
Review scores
Source	Rating
AllMusic	4/5 stars
The Encyclopedia of Popular Music	3/5 stars
The Penguin Guide to Jazz on CD	3.5/4 stars

JazzTimes deemed the album Braden's "first masterpiece," writing that "the title tune's mercurial sax-piano-bass-drums slo-burn is also the album's vibe signifier." The Irish Times determined that "the real meat, and Braden's most unbuttoned soloing, is from the final session, a trio with Christian McBride and Jeff 'Tain' Watts, with the tenor energised." The Boston Herald stated: "More Rollins than Coltrane, Braden plays the spaces as well as any young saxman, knows the value of a melody and gives his sidemen ... space to shine."

AllMusic called The Fire Within "a fine record" and "a varied but balanced disc of traditional jazz."

== Track listing ==
No.	Title	Length
1.	"Incendiary"
2.	"All or Nothing at All"
3.	"Solar"
4.	"The Boiling Point"
5.	"Smoke Gets in Your Eyes"
6.	"Thermo"
7.	"Where There's Smoke"
8.	"The Fire Within"
9.	"Fried Bananas"
10.	"Doctune"
