= Tómas R. Einarsson =

Icelandic composer and double bass player

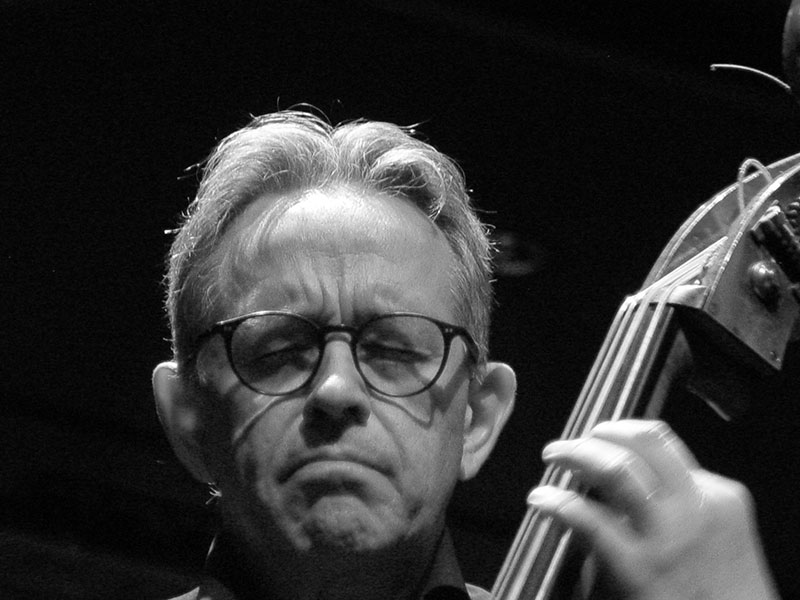
- Reykjavík Jazz Festival 2015
- Born: Tómas Ragnar Einarsson; March 25, 1953 (age 72); Blönduós, Iceland
- Occupations: Musician, composer
- Known for: Jazz, latin jazz
- Website: tomasr.is

Tómas R. Einarsson (born 1953) is an Icelandic composer and double bass player who has been prominent in the Icelandic jazz scene since the early nineties. Much of his later work is influenced by Cuban jazz music.

In 2014 he was granted the Order of the Falcon by the President of Iceland for his contribution to jazz and culture.

== Life and career ==
Tómas was born in the town Blönduós in the north of Iceland and grew up in Dalabyggð. He studied at Hamrahlid College in Reykjavík and was at the time a radical socialist who often took part in demonstrations. He began playing the double bass during his time studying history and Spanish at the University of Iceland. His first composition on record appeared in 1982 with the jazz group Nýja kompaníið on the album Þegar kvölda tekur.

In 1992 he formed the band Reykjavík Jazz Quartet with the saxophonist Sigurður Flosason. The group was popular in the nineties and performed around Europe. He also toured and made albums with the Ólafur Stephensen Trio.

He won the Icelandic Music Awards in 2003 for the jazz record of the year and jazz composition of the year, in 2004 for the jazz composition of the year for his song with Ólafía Hrönn, and then again in 2012 for the jazz composition of the year.

In 2015 he released an album with Sigríður Thorlacius, the singer from the pop group Hjaltalín.

The majority of Tómas' compositions have appeared on his own records, but they may be found on over 20 albums by other artists. He has been a sideman on recordings with several well-known Icelandic artists, including folk singer Megas, rock artist Bubbi Morthens, and indie artist Mugison.

=== Latin jazz ===
Tómas' first latin jazz record came out in 2002. The Cuban-influenced recordings became popular in Iceland and he toured extensively with his latin group around Europe and America. A techno remix of the albums was made in 2007, RommTommTechno, produced by President Bongo from the Icelandic electro-group GusGus.

=== Films ===
A documentary about Tómas was made in 2015 under the title Latin Viking (Latínbóndinn). The biographical film followed Tómas around as he toured in Cuba, as well as his home town. The film was moderately well received and was described as having an impactful narrative.

Tómas' music can be found in a total of 13 movies and TV films.

He directed and wrote the manuscript of a TV documentary film about the writer Guðbergur Bergsson. In 2011 Tómas wrote the music to the documentary film about the Icelandic writer and Nobel prize winner Halldór Laxness.

=== Translations ===
Tómas has translated works by several Latin American authors such as Isabel Allende, Gabriel García Márquez, and Julio Cortázar. He also translated The Dancer Upstairs by the English novelist Nicholas Shakespeare.

== Selected discography ==
=== As leader ===
- 1989 – Nýr tónn
- 1991 – Íslandsför
- 1994 – Landsýn
- 1998 – Á góðum degi
- 2000 – Undir 4
- 2002 – Kúbanska
- 2003 – Havana
- 2004 – Dance you idiot! (Dansaðu fíflið þitt dansaðu!)
- 2005 – Let jazz be bestowed on the huts
- 2006 – Romm Tomm Tomm
- 2007 – Rommtommtechno
- 2008 – Trúnó
- 2009 – LIVE!
- 2009 – Reykjavík-Havana
- 2009 – Early Latin
- 2011 – Strengur
- 2012 – Laxness
- 2013 – Bassanótt
- 2014 – Mannabörn
- 2016 – Bongó
- 2017 – Innst inni

=== As co-leader ===
- 1985 – Þessi ófétis jazz
- 1987 – Hinsegin blús
- 1994 – Hot house – Reykjavik Jazz Quartet live at Ronnie Scott´s
- 1995 – Koss with Ólafía Hrönn
- 2000 – Í draumum var þetta helst
- 2015 – Bræðralag
