= Sanctified Shells =

Studio album by Steve Turre
- Released: February 23, 1993
- Recorded: March 11 – June 3, 1992
- Studios: Clinton Recording Studios, NYC; East Side Sound, NYC
- Genres: Jazz; Post bop
- Length: 57:06
- Label: Antilles

Steve Turre chronology
| Right There (1991) | Sanctified Shells (1993) | Rhythm Within (1995) |

Sanctified Shells is a studio album by American jazz trombonist Steve Turre, released on February 23, 1993, by Antilles Records.

== Background ==
Working with Rahsaan Roland Kirk, Turre was introduced by Kirk to the seashell (conch) as an instrument. Since then, he has been incorporating seashells into his music, including leading the Sanctified Shells ensemble, a "small orchestra of brass musicians who also play modified seashells", or likewise, a "shell choir", for which the album was based upon.

== Reception ==
Professional ratings
Review scores
| Source | Rating |
|---|---|
| AllMusic | 3/5 stars |

The AllMusic review by Scott Yanow stated, "Steve Turre's trombone playing takes a back seat to his work with shells on this CD. [...] There is an OK guest appearance by Dizzy Gillespie on 'Toreador' and worthy spots for trumpeter Charlie Sepulveda, trombonist Clifton Anderson, and several percussionists, along with fine contributions from bassist Andy González and drummer Herlin Riley."

== Track listing ==
All tracks are written by Steve Turre except where noted.

| No. | Title | Writer(s) | Length |
|---|---|---|---|
| 1. | "Exploration" | | 5:10 |
| 2. | "Gumbo" | | 5:39 |
| 3. | "Africian Shells: First Interlude – Strength" | Kimati Dinizulu; Turre | 1:14 |
| 4. | "Macho (Para Machito)" | | 7:05 |
| 5. | "Africian Shells: Second Interlude – The Dream" | | 4:12 |
| 6. | "Beautiful India" | | 11:19 |
| 7. | "Toreador" | | 8:22 |
| 8. | "African Shells: Third Interlude – Happiness" | Dinizulu; Turre | 2:10 |
| 9. | "Sanctified Shells" | | 4:27 |
| 10. | "Spirit Man" | | 7:28 |
| Total length: | | | 57:06 |

- Tracks 4 & 7 recorded on January 31, 1992, at Clinton Recording Studios, New York City
- Tracks 1, 2 & 9 recorded on March 11, 1992, tracks 3, 5, 6, 8 & 10 recorded on May 11, 1992, at East Side Sound, New York City
- All tracks mixed on June 1–3, 1992 at East Side Sound, New York City
- Mastered at Foothill Digital Productions, Inc., New York City

== Personnel ==
Musicians

- Steve Turre – trombone (4, 7, 9), horn, kudu horn (8), bells (1, 6), shaker (1), shells, llama hooves [percussion] (1)
- Charlie Sepúlveda – trumpet (4, 7)
- Dizzy Gillespie – trumpet (guest artist) (7)
- Clifton Anderson – trombone (4, 7)
- Robin Eubanks – trombone (2, 4, 7), shells (1, 2, 6, 9, 10)
- Reynaldo Jorge – trombone (4, 7), maracas (1), shells (1, 2, 6, 9, 10)
- Douglas Purviance – trombone, bass trombone (4, 7)
- Andrew González – bass (1, 2, 4, 6, 7, 9, 10), claves (4)
- Carmen Turre – castanets (7)
- Herlin Riley – drums (1, 2, 9), cowbell (2), shells, tambourine (9)
- Ignacio Berroa – drums (4, 7), bells (4), timbales (4)
- Badal Roy – tabla (6)
- Claude Thomas – jun-jun (10)
- Kimati Dinizulu – djembe (1, 5, 8, 10), gome (1, 3, 5, 8, 10), krin (3, 5, 8, 10), percussion, caxixi (8), sankofa akyene [percussion] (1, 3, 5, 8, 10)
- Milton Cardona – claves (1), congas (1, 2, 4, 7), güiro (4), guitarrón, shekere (1, 2), shaker, percussion

Technical

- Brian Bacchus – executive producer
- Billy Banks – producer
- Jim Anderson (4, 7), Nick Prout (1–3, 5, 6, 8–10) – recording engineer
- Angela R. Dryden – assistant recording engineer (1–3, 5, 6, 8–10)
- Allan Tucker – mastering
- Nate Herr – product manager
- Aldo Sampieri – typography
- James Browne – liner notes
- Patrick Roques – art direction, design
- Jules Allen – photography
