= Don Braden =

American jazz saxophonist

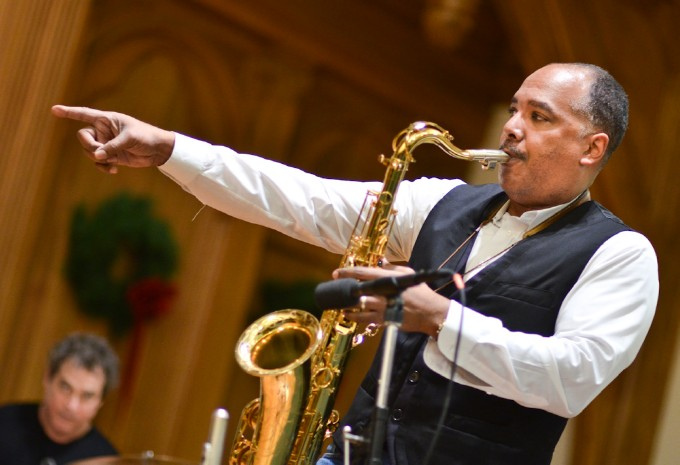
- Don Braden and the Big Funk Band, Morristown, New Jersey, December 31, 2011

Background information
- Born: November 20, 1963 (age 62); Cincinnati, Ohio, U.S.
- Origin: New York City
- Genres: Jazz
- Occupations: Musician, composer
- Instruments: Tenor saxophone, flute
- Years active: 1984–present
- Website: www.donbraden.com

Donald Kirk Braden (born November 20, 1963) is an American jazz tenor saxophonist and flautist.

== Career ==
Braden was born in Cincinnati, Ohio, on November 20, 1963, and raised in Louisville, Kentucky. He began playing tenor sax at age 13 and started playing professionally at 15. In high school, he played in the McDonald's All-American High School Jazz Band. He attended Harvard University from 1981 to 1984, studied engineering, and played in the school's jazz ensemble. He moved to New York City in 1984, where he played with The Harper Brothers, Lonnie Smith, and Betty Carter. In 1986–87 he toured with Wynton Marsalis. In the late 1980s and early 1990s he toured internationally with Freddie Hubbard. He also played with Roy Haynes, Tony Williams, J.J. Johnson, Tom Harrell, Art Farmer, and the Mingus Big Band.

Braden led his own bands from the early 1990s, while also recording as a freelancer.

Braden has served as the music director of the Litchfield Jazz Camp since 1998, and in his tenure there he has participated in numerous programs, including co-hosting the annual Litchfield Jazz Camp Talent Search. He currently runs the Jazz Combo Initiative at Harvard College.

== Discography ==
=== As leader ===
- The Time Is Now (Criss Cross, 1991)
- Wish List (Criss Cross, 1993)
- After Dark (Criss Cross, 1994)
- Landing Zone (Landmark, 1995)
- Organic (Epicure, 1995)
- The Open Road (Double-Time, 1996)
- The Voice of the Saxophone (RCA, 1997)
- The Fire Within (RCA, 1999)
- Contemporary Standards Ensemble (Double-Time, 2000)
- Brighter Days (HighNote, 2001)
- The New Hang (HighNote, 2004)
- Workin' - Live at Cecil's (HighNote, 2006)
- Gentle Storm (HighNote, 2008)
- The Strayhorn Project (with Mark Rapp) (Premium Music Solutions, 2009)
- Big Fun(k) Live (with Karl Latham) (Creative Perspective Music, 2011)
- Come Together (with Julie Michels) (Creative Perspective Music/JHP, 2012)
- Full Circle (with Vanessa Rubin) (Creative Perspective Music, 2013)
- Luminosity (Creative Perspective Music, 2015)
- Earth Wind and Wonder (Creative Perspective Music, 2018)
- Earth Wind and Wonder Volume 2 (Self-released, 2022)

=== As sideman ===
With Art Farmer

- Silk Road (Arabesque, 1997)

With Freddie Hubbard

- At Jazz Jamboree Warszawa '91: A Tribute to Miles (Starburst, 2000)

With Jimmy Ponder

- Guitar Christmas (HighNote, 1998)

With Roseanna Vitro

- Tropical Postcards (A Records, 2004)
