= Rasul Siddik =

American jazz musician (1949–2023)

Rasul Olufemi Siddik
- Birth name: Jan Corlus Mahr
- Born: September 20, 1949; St. Louis, Missouri, U.S.
- Died: January 16, 2023 (aged 73)
- Occupation: Jazz trumpeter

Rasul Olufemi Siddik (born Jan Corlus Mahr; September 20, 1949 – January 16, 2023) was an American jazz trumpeter. He was a member of the Association for the Advancement of Creative Musicians (AACM).

== Early life ==
Siddik was born in St. Louis. He was the fifth of eight children, and was named Jan Corlus Mahr. His father listened to a lot of music in the house, where there was also a piano. He was passed down a trumpet by his older brother, and then "started taking lessons at the community music school, but he was unhappy with his teacher. Shortly after, his trumpet was stolen, and the family wasn't able to acquire a replacement for a couple of years, when his junior high school started a band." He learned to read music in this band, but was largely self-taught on trumpet. He briefly attended a Catholic high school, matching his parents' religion, but moved to a vocational school. He left with a General Equivalency Diploma.

== Career ==
Siddik played early in his career with the St. Louis Creative Ensemble, playing with Charles "Bobo" Shaw and Joseph Bowie. Unwilling to be drafted into the Vietnam War – "they were drafting all the black people, and sending them straight to Vietnam, [...] I couldn't see going to another country fighting people when we weren't free at home" – he left for Chicago.

In Chicago, he changed his name from Jan Corlus Mahr to Rasul Olufemi Siddik. After a period of introspection and attending the AACM's music school, he enrolled at the Malcolm X College. However, he was located by the military authorities, so attempted further means of avoiding the draft. Ultimately, he was required to attend an assessment meeting in St. Louis: "I went down there looking like one of Sun Ra's boys – space suit, an Indian robe, and a poncho. I had my hair all braided up, a little space hat. I went back to my revolutionary thing – I can't wait to get to boot camp so I can shoot me some honkies and rednecks, I can't stand white people, I can't take orders from no white man, blah blah blah." He was rejected as 4-F.

In the 1980s, he worked with Karlton Hester's Contemporary Art Movement and with Michele Rosewoman before joining Henry Threadgill's sextet from about 1984 through the end of the decade. Concomitantly, he played in the latter half of the 1980s with Lester Bowie, Oliver Lake, and Julius Hemphill. He first began working with David Murray around 1987, an association that continued into the 2000s. He moved to Paris in the 1990s, where he worked with Billy Bang, Ghasem Batamuntu, Christian Blazer, Hamiett Bluiett, Benjamin Duboc, Kahil El'Zabar, Bobby Few, Sunny Murray, and Romano Partesi.
