= Akua Dixon =

American cellist and singer

- Born: July 14, 1948 (age 78); New York City, U.S.
- Genres: Classical; jazz
- Occupations: Musician; composer; lawyer
- Instrument: Cello
- Years active: 1970s–present
- Spouse: Steve Turre (m. 1978; div. 2012)
- Website: www.akuadixon.com
- Education: Manhattan School of Music

Akua Dixon (born July 14, 1948) is an American classical and jazz cellist, composer, and lawyer.

== Early years ==
Dixon was born and raised in New York City. Her early musical experience included singing in a Baptist church. She was educated in New York, first at the High School of Performing Arts and then the Manhattan School of Music, under the tutlage of Bernard Heifetz. During these years, she was a freelance cellist, working as a session musician and with Broadway pit orchestras.

== Career ==
An early high point in Dixon's career was playing a concert with Duke Ellington when she was around 25 years old. She went on to performing at the Copacabana nightclub, the Apollo Theater (with James Brown), and the Waldorf (with Diana Ross and Tony Bennett).

Groups in which Dixon has played in include the Symphony of the New World and the String Reunion, the latter accompanied by her violinist sister, Gayle, and Noel Pointer. Later, she performed with the Neo-Bass Ensemble and Quartette Indigo (also with her sister). Her own group, the Akua Dixon String Ensemble, has accompanied singer Carmen McRae; saxophonists Frank Foster, Antonio Hart, Jimmy Heath, and Pharoah Sanders; trumpeter Woody Shaw; and bassist Buster Williams, among other jazz musicians.

Dixon was also an educator in the 1970s, teaching voice and cello in Harlem public schools and at the New Muse Community Museum, in Brooklyn. She was featured in the November 1979 issue of Essence magazine.

Dixon created string arrangements for Lauryn Hill's album The Miseducation of Lauryn Hill, which won five Grammy Awards, and for A Rose Is Still a Rose by Aretha Franklin, which was nominated for a Grammy Award. Recordings on which Dixon played include the soundtrack of the film School Daze and Fire and Ice.

With the support of a Rockefeller grant, Dixon composed The Opera of Marie Laveau in the late 1980s.

Dixon received the 1998 African-American Classical Music Award from Spelman College, and she received two grants from the National Endowment for the Arts, the first in 1974, for composition and performance.

== Personal life ==
Dixon married Steve Turre, a jazz trombonist. They have a daughter and a son, both of whom pursued musical careers. They divorced in 2012.
