= Steve Turre =

American jazz trombonist (born 1948)

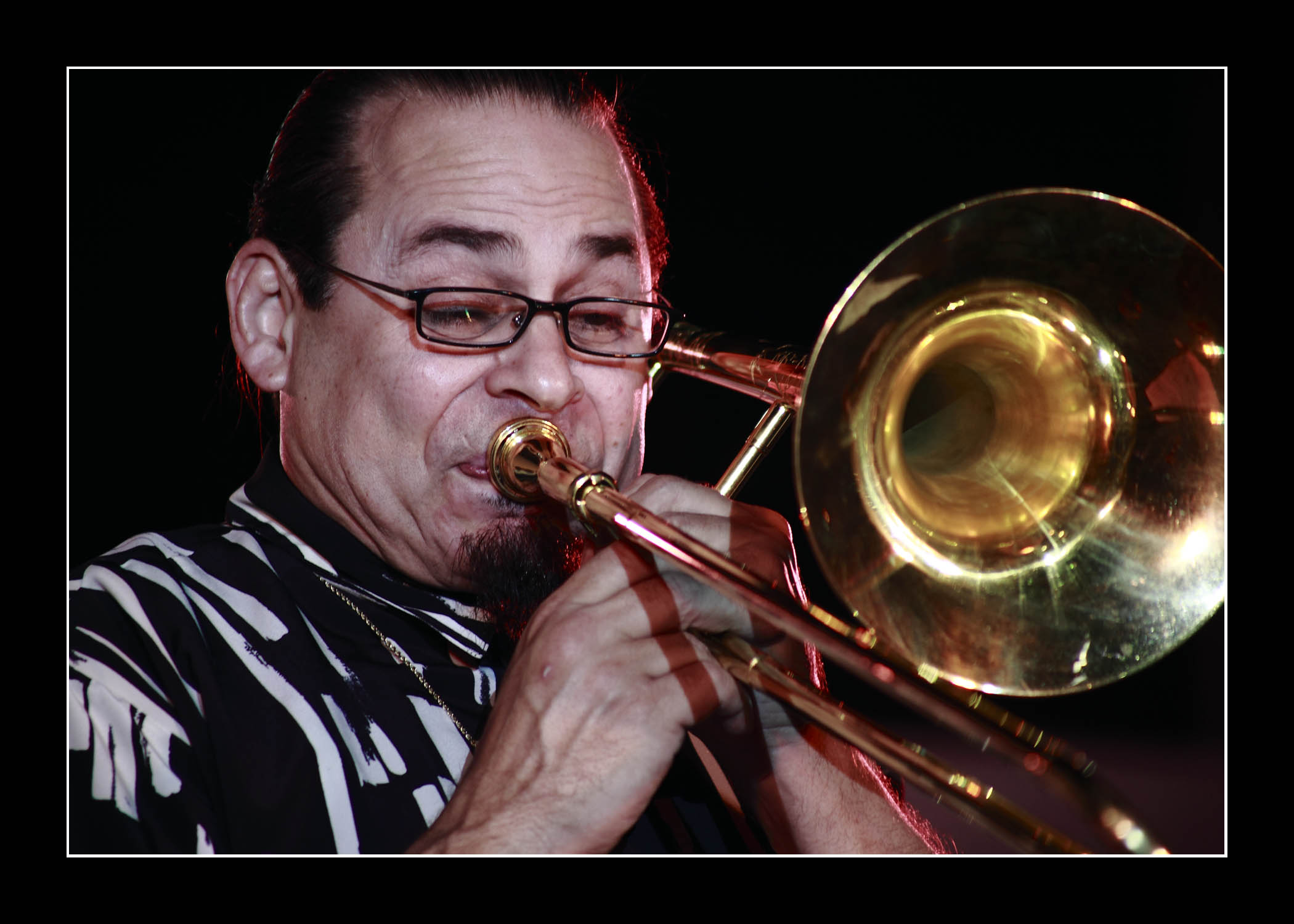
- Turre in 2011

Background information
- Born: Stephen Johnson Turre; September 12, 1948 (age 78); Omaha, Nebraska, U.S.
- Genre: Jazz
- Occupations: Musician; arranger; educator
- Instruments: Trombone; conch shells
- Works: Discography
- Years active: 1970–present
- Labels: Verve; Telarc; HighNote; Smoke Sessions
- Spouse: Akua Dixon (m. 1978; div. 2012)
- Website: steveturre.com

Stephen Johnson Turre (/tɜːrˈeɪ/ tur-AY; born September 12, 1948) is an American jazz trombonist and a pioneer of using seashells as instruments, as well as a composer, arranger, and educator at the collegiate-conservatory level. For sixty-three years, Turre has been active in jazz, rock, and Latin jazz – in live venues, recording studios, television, and cinema production.

He has recorded over 20 albums as a bandleader, and appeared on many more as a contributor or sideman. As a studio musician, Turre is among the most prolific living jazz trombonists in the world. He has been a member of the Saturday Night Live Band since 1985.

== Early life ==
Born in Omaha, Nebraska, Turre is one of five children born to James Boles Turre (1921–1997) and Carmen Marie (née Johnson). His father was of Northern Italian ancestry and his mother was of Mexican ancestry. His grandfather, Ernest Turre, was a founder of the San Francisco 49ers with Tony Morabito. His four siblings are Michael James Turre (b. 1946), Suzanne Turre (b. 1952), Michele Anita Turre (b. 1953), and Peter Joseph Turre (b. 1957). Michael and Peter were musicians – saxophonist/woodwinds and drummer, respectively.

Turre was raised in Lafayette, California (San Francisco Bay area). He began playing trombone at age ten, during his fourth grade in school. In his early teens, he played in a band with his elder brother, Michael. Although he entered California State University, Sacramento, on a football scholarship, he studied music theory there for two years before transferring to the University of North Texas College of Music, where he studied from 1968 to 1969 and played in a band led by trumpeter Hannibal Peterson.

Turre has been a resident of Montclair, New Jersey.

== Career highlights ==
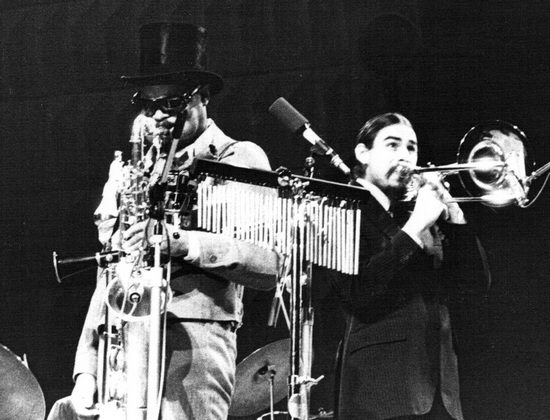
Turre (right) with Rahsaan Roland Kirk in Paris, 1976. Besides the saxophone, Kirk was known for performing on a variety of flutes, whistles, and other exotic or handmade instruments, including conch shells.

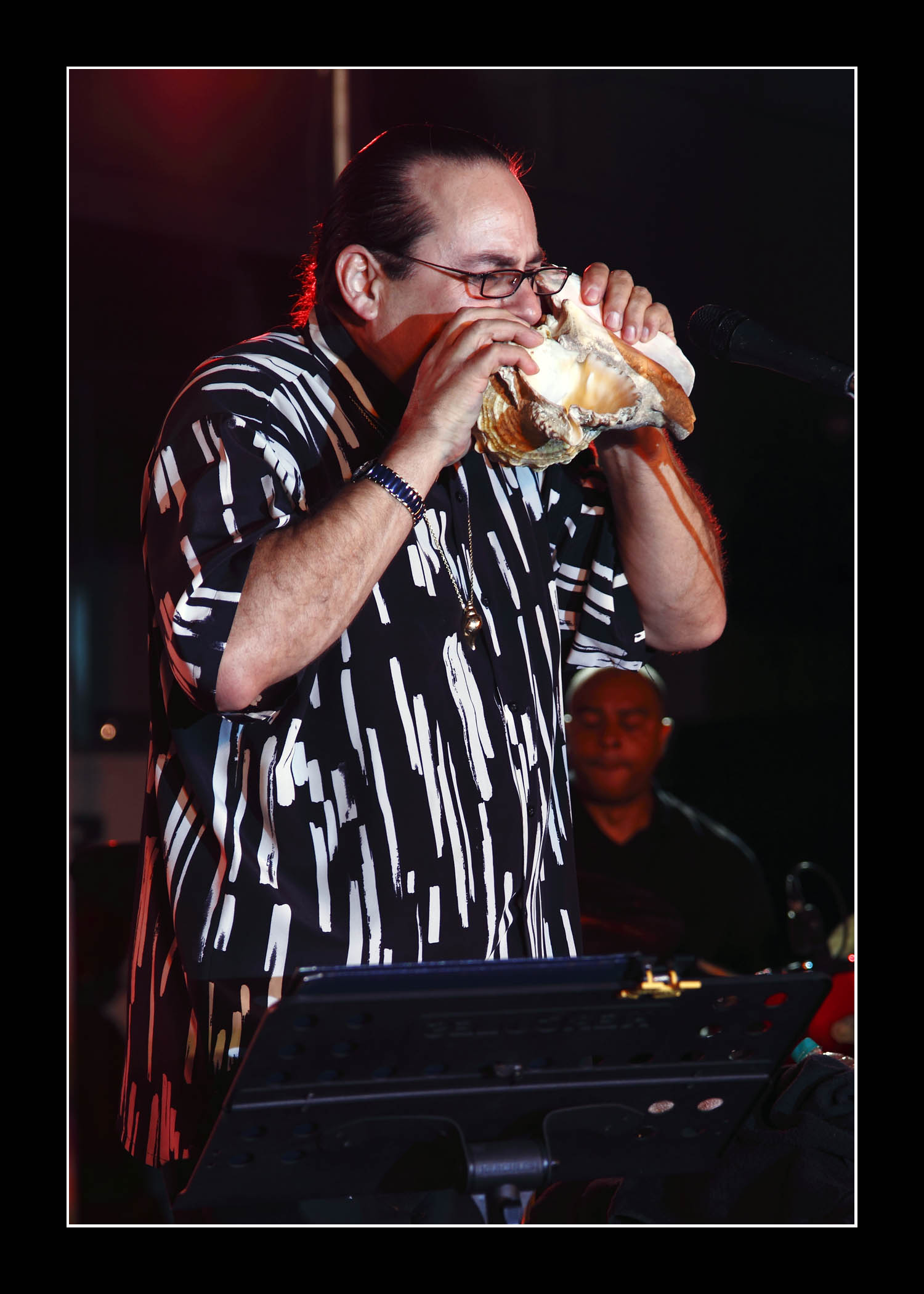
The Steve Turre Quintet at the Jazz Festival at Ishanya in Pune, India, 2011

In 1968, Turre played with Rahsaan Roland Kirk. In 1970 he recorded with Carlos Santana, and in 1972 he toured with Ray Charles. He has been trombonist for the Saturday Night Live Band since 1985 and has taught jazz trombone at the Manhattan School of Music since 1988.

For fifty-six years (since 1970), Turre has been an exponent of seashells – conch in particular – as serious musical instruments. According to Turre, encouragement came from Rahsaan Roland Kirk who was known for using a vast array of saxophones, flutes, and other instruments. Turre has a collection of shells of various sizes, most of them picked up during his travels in the Caribbean and elsewhere. The shells have their mouthpieces carefully cut and are tuned to specific pitches. When playing them as a soloist, he frequently switches between shells, as each is limited in its register (the smallest shells, for example, have a practical register of only a fifth). His largest shell, from the Great Barrier Reef of Australia, has a range between the D and E below middle C, and was painted by a Cuban artist. He also leads the Sanctified Shells, which is a "shell choir" made up of brass players who double on seashell (using shells from Turre's collection, which he loans out for rehearsals and performances). The group released its first, eponymous album in 1993. Turre has had a long experience with Latin jazz and is a skilled player of the cowbell and Venezuelan maracas.

Turre has been a member of the Juilliard School faculty for twenty years – since 2008, and previously from 2001 to 2003. Turre earned his bachelor's degree from the University of Massachusetts Amherst through the University Without Walls in 1980 with a focus in Afro-American Music and Jazz.

== Personal life ==
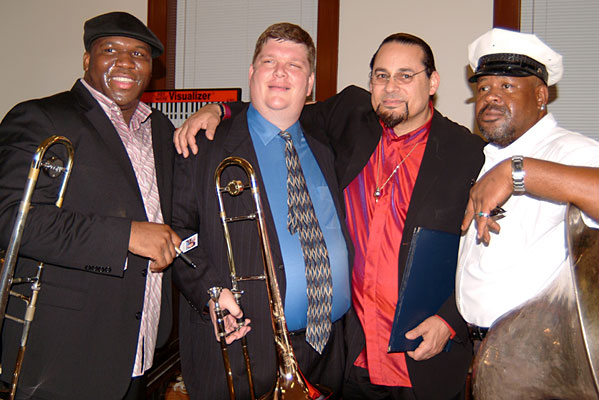
From left: Big Sam Williams, Jeff Albert, Turre, and Kirk Joseph (2006)

Turre has been married three times. His first wife was Susan J. Beard, whom he married in 1970 in Dallas, Texas, and divorced in 1972 in San Francisco. His second wife was cellist Akua Dixon (born 1948) from 1978 to 2012, with whom he had two children: Andromeda Turre, a jazz vocalist and composer, and Orion Turre, a jazz drummer. His present wife is Pamela Turre, whom he married on September 24, 2017.

== Awards and honors ==
- Best Trombonist, DownBeat Readers' Poll, 1998, 1999, 2001, 2002, 2006
