= Braids (album) =

Live album by Sam Rivers Quartet
- Released: 2020
- Recorded: May 15, 1979
- Venues: Hamburg, Germany
- Genre: Free jazz
- Length: 56:51
- Labels: NoBusiness; NBCD 138
- Producers: Danas Mikailionis, Ed Hazell, Valerij Anosov

Sam Rivers chronology
Ricochet (2020)	Braids (2020)	Undulation (2021)

Braids is a live album by the Sam Rivers Quartet, led by multi-instrumentalist and composer Rivers, and featuring tubist and euphonium player Joe Daley, double bassist Dave Holland and drummer Thurman Barker. Consisting of a single 57-minute performance, it was recorded on May 15, 1979, in Hamburg, Germany, and was released in 2020 by NoBusiness Records as volume 4 of the Sam Rivers Archive Series.

The Rivers Quartet with this lineup also appeared on Waves (Tomato, 1978 [1979]) and Live in Vancouver (Condition West, 1979 [2017]). Braids is based on material selected from Rivers' massive recorded archives, which are curated by writer and producer Ed Hazell, who spent a year reviewing tapes with the goal of choosing the best recordings for release by NoBusiness Records.

== Reception ==
Professional ratings
Review scores
Source	Rating
All About Jazz	4/5 stars
All About Jazz	4.5/5 stars
The Free Jazz Collective	5/5 stars
Tom Hull – on the Web	A−

In a review for All About Jazz, John Sharpe called the album "thoroughly entertaining," and noted Rivers' "freewheeling anything-goes approach" to the music. He wrote: "Each member of the group proves adept at hinting at form, even when it's not explicitly present, both through dramatic solo development... and through the cohesive arc of ensemble performance."

Dusted Magazine's Derek Taylor stated that the album "beautifully encapsulates the weave-like structure that was both Sam Rivers' musical methodology and his history of creative partnerships," and commented: "the music unfolds in episodic suite-like fashion... It's another invaluable aperture into the master's antiquity when he was regularly in the company of expert peers."

Ken Waxman of The Whole Note noted Daley's "sophisticated dexterity on tuba and euphonium... [in] both accompanying and frontline roles," and his ability to play "with the swift facility of a valve trombonist," enabling him to "bounce from treble sheets of sound to guttural scoops."

Writing for the Downtown Music Gallery, Tim Niland stated that "the performance is very strong," and remarked: "the music has a very interesting sound with both Daley and Holland creating wonderful low end textures that play with and off of one another alongside the reeds, piano and drums to build unique and compelling conception."

The Free Jazz Collective's Tom Burris wrote: "The music builds toward a very mid-70s Holland/Rivers/Altschul dynamic with tuba counterpoint for accentuation. It's completely exhilarating and engrossing right up until the death scene at the end of a spaghetti western."

== Track listing ==
Composed by Sam Rivers.

1. "An Evening in Hamburg, Part One" – 18:44
2. "An Evening in Hamburg, Part Two" – 38:07

== Personnel ==
- Sam Rivers – tenor saxophone, soprano saxophone, flute, piano
- Joe Daley – tuba, euphonium
- Dave Holland – double bass, cello
- Thurman Barker – drums
