= Ricochet (Sam Rivers album) =

Live album by Sam Rivers Trio
- Released: 2020
- Recorded: January 12, 1978
- Venue: Keystone Korner, San Francisco, California
- Genre: Free jazz
- Length: 52:14
- Label: NoBusiness; NBCD 128
- Producer: Danas Mikailionis, Ed Hazell, Valerij Anosov

Sam Rivers chronology
| Zenith (2019) | Ricochet (2020) | Braids (2020) |

Ricochet is a live album by the Sam Rivers Trio, led by multi-instrumentalist and composer Rivers, and featuring double bassist Dave Holland and drummer Barry Altschul. Consisting of a single 52-minute track, it was recorded on January 12, 1978, at the Keystone Korner in San Francisco, California, and was released in 2020 by NoBusiness Records as volume 3 of the Sam Rivers Archive Series.

The trio was active from 1972 until 1978, and was influential in the New York loft jazz scene centered around Rivers' Studio Rivbea. Although the group toured and performed widely, it was not well documented on record, with the exception of the Rivers albums The Quest (1976) and Paragon (1977), as well as Holland's Conference of the Birds (1973), which also included Anthony Braxton. In 2007, the trio reunited and recorded the music that was released in 2012 on the album Reunion: Live in New York.

The album is based on material selected from Rivers' massive recorded archives, which are curated by writer and producer Ed Hazell, who spent a year reviewing tapes with the goal of choosing the best recordings for release by NoBusiness Records.

== Reception ==
Professional ratings
Review scores
| Source | Rating |
|---|---|
| All About Jazz | 4.5/5 stars |
| The Free Jazz Collective | 5/5 stars |
| Tom Hull – on the Web | B+ |

In a review for All About Jazz, Glenn Astarita stated that the musicians "shoot for the stars" on the single long track, and noted their "stunning fluency and micro-second paradigm shifts." He wrote: "the iconic trio conveys a level of camaraderie and gamesmanship that transforms your listening space into a virtual live event... this is essential listening, and an educational tour-de-force for the younger crowd who have not been indoctrinated to Rivers' early mind-bending recorded output."

Olie Brice of London Jazz News described the trio as "the greatest of Rivers' working groups," and called the album "a fantastic addition to the recorded legacy of one of the great improvising groups," commenting: "The trio embraces a wide range from atonal, chamber-like improvisation to dancing, riff-based grooves with a clear tonal centre to exhilarating, swinging free jazz. The speed and fluency with which they pick up on each other’s suggestions and organically move between improvised sections is a delight."

The Free Jazz Collective's Gary Chapin called the rhythm section of Holland and Altschul "extraordinary" and "one of the pillar rhythm sections of This Kind of Music," and noted that "each instrument – soprano, tenor, piano – opens up different possibilities for Rivers, but they all sound so like him."

Writing for Point of Departure, John Sharpe remarked: "This outfit could write the book on trio interplay... Transitions... are handled with such aplomb that they might be preordained... Such events amid the magnificent flow make this outing one of the most satisfying performances from these three titans."

In an article for Dusted Magazine, Derek Taylor wrote: "the trio was already one of Rivers' most revered configurations and an epitome of spontaneous communication. A reunion convened nearly thirty years later revealed chemistry slightly altered, but effectively undiminished... Rivers is... a wonder of tonal and phrasal ingenuity atop the commensurately marvelous contributions of his colleagues."

Writer Raul Da Gama stated: "The music of Ricochet is rugged and highly charged, and is amongst the finest improvised music on record... it contains extraordinary textures and remarkable juxtapositions between Mr Rivers' horns, flute and piano, and Dave Holland's bass and cello, together with the roaring battery of Barry Altschul's drum kit. This piece seems to have been conceived in fire; carved out of living flesh rather than sonic elements."

== Track listing ==
Composed by Sam Rivers.

1. "Ricochet" – 52:14

== Personnel ==
- Sam Rivers – tenor saxophone, soprano saxophone, flute, piano
- Dave Holland – double bass, cello
- Barry Altschul – drums
