= Reunion: Live in New York =

Live album by Sam Rivers, Dave Holland, and Barry Altschul
- Released: 2012
- Recorded: May 25, 2007
- Venue: Miller Theatre; Columbia University, NYC
- Genre: Free jazz
- Length: 1:26:56
- Label: Pi Recordings; PI45
- Producer: Yulun Wang

Sam Rivers chronology
Trilogy (2011)	Reunion: Live in New York (2012)	Live in Vancouver (2017)

Reunion: Live in New York is a live album by the Sam Rivers trio, featuring Rivers on saxophone, flute, and piano, Dave Holland on bass, and Barry Altschul on drums. It was recorded on May 25, 2007, at Columbia University's Miller Theatre in New York City, and was released in 2012 as a double-CD set by Pi Recordings.

The trio was originally active from 1972 until 1978, and was influential in the New York loft jazz scene centered around Rivers' Studio Rivbea. Although the group toured and performed widely, it was not well documented on record, with the exception of the Rivers albums The Quest (1976) and Paragon (1977), as well as Holland's Conference of the Birds (1973), which also included Anthony Braxton. In 2020, NoBusiness Records released Ricochet, a live recording of the trio from 1978, as volume 3 of the label's Sam Rivers Archive Series.

Reunion was recorded at the end of a marathon Sam Rivers festival presented by Columbia's WKCR-FM, and documents the trio's first performance in 26 years. It captures a fully-improvised performance that was presented without any prior rehearsal, with two sets that lasted nearly 1½ hours in total. In a concert review for The New York Times, Nate Chinen called Rivers, then 83 years old, "a genial and indefatigable eminence in the jazz avant-garde," and stated that the performance "confirmed the expressive power of collective improvisation," praising the trio's "jubilant strain of free jazz." Holland later reflected: "We didn't need to prepare... With Sam and Barry, it felt natural. Even though we had all been through musical changes, the focus and creative connection was still the same—essentially three friends having musical conversations."

== Reception ==
Professional ratings
Review scores
Source	Rating
DownBeat	4.5/5 stars
All About Jazz	4.5/5 stars
Tom Hull – on the Web	A−
PopMatters	8/10 stars
Financial Times	4/5 stars
The Free Jazz Collective	5/5 stars
Orlando Weekly	5/5 stars

In a review for DownBeat, Bill Meyer wrote: "the participants honor their past by doing just what they did back in the day. They jump right in, guided by freedom not as a command for music to sound a certain way, but as license for them to play whatever they decided to play in the moment."

Lloyd Sachs of Jazz Times noted that "At 83, Rivers rises to the occasion with a sustained power that would be remarkable coming from an artist half his age," and stated: "It's difficult to imagine a more luminous, naturally flowing, enjoyable performance."

Writing for All About Jazz, Mark Corroto commented: "If this recording had been made in 1977 instead of 2007 it would have been a watershed event. Here, it is a masterpiece of a reunion."

In an article for PopMatters, John Garratt called Reunion "one of the purest jazz albums of the year," and remarked: "the amount of restraint showed by the trio is something to behold. Their drop in dynamics and shift in mood happens with no grand gesture. It just happens in purest sense that improvised music will allow."

Mike Hobart of the Financial Times wrote: "The two continuous performances of this beautifully recorded 2007 reunion capture the empathy and rhythmic sparkle, as Rivers swaps sharp-edged tenor for bucolic flute or lyrical soprano for Latin-tinged piano with a steely, over-arching logic."

The Free Jazz Collective's Paul Acquaro stated: "The spirit of the recording is infectious. Rivers... plays with an undeniable amount of energy. Pulling from all genres and styles, the recording is ever changing, an endless variety of musical ideas growing organically and freely. Melody and freedom abound, and the whole damn thing grooves."

Writing for the Orlando Weekly, Jason Ferguson commented: "The 90 minutes of music... vibrate with an intensity, freedom and unspoken connection that recollects the loft scene's '70s glory without explicitly referencing it. The recording quality is unimpeachable, but what is far more interesting is how these players' approaches to music have evolved over three decades without losing their essential magic."

Chris Barton of the Los Angeles Times wrote that the music "immediately draws the ear here with a fluid and ever-evolving sort of movement," and praised the players' interplay, stating that it "can take your breath away."

== Track listing ==
Composed by Sam Rivers, Dave Holland, and Barry Altschul.

=== Disc 1 ===
1. "Part 1" – 8:07
2. "Part 2" – 9:41
3. "Part 3" – 15:45
4. "Part 4" – 8:37
5. "Part 5" – 9:32

=== Disc 2 ===
1. "Part 1" – 8:55
2. "Part 2" – 14:46
3. "Part 3" – 4:10
4. "Part 4" – 7:23

== Personnel ==
- Sam Rivers – tenor saxophone, soprano saxophone, flute, piano
- Dave Holland – bass
- Barry Altschul – drums
