= The Quest (Sam Rivers album) =

Live album by Sam Rivers
- Released: 1976
- Recorded: March 12 and 13, 1976
- Venue: Rassegna Internazionale Jazz, Palazzo dello Sport, Milan, Italy
- Genre: Free jazz
- Label: Red; VPA 106

Sam Rivers chronology
Sam Rivers / Dave Holland Vol. 2 (1976)	The Quest (1976)	Black Africa! Villalago (1977)

The Quest is a live album by Sam Rivers on which he is accompanied by double bassist Dave Holland and drummer Barry Altschul. It was recorded on March 12 and 13, 1976, during the Rassegna Internazionale Jazz at the Palazzo dello Sport in Milan, Italy, and was initially released later that year by Red Records. It was reissued the following year by Pausa Records, and was also reissued by Fabbri Editori in a variety of forms over the next four years.

The trio was active from 1972 until 1978, and was influential in the New York loft jazz scene centered around Rivers' Studio Rivbea. Although the group toured and performed widely, it was not well documented on record, with the exception of this album, plus the Rivers album Paragon (1977) and Holland's Conference of the Birds (1973), which also included Anthony Braxton. In 2007, the trio reunited and recorded the music that was released in 2012 on the album Reunion: Live in New York. In 2020, NoBusiness Records released Ricochet, a live recording of the trio from 1978, as volume 3 of the label's Sam Rivers Archive Series.

== Reception ==
Professional ratings
Review scores
Source	Rating
AllMusic	4/5 stars
Jazzwise	4/5 stars

In a review for All About Jazz, Tim Niland wrote: "This trio had been playing together for quite a while, and it really shows with the group turning on a dime... This was a very exciting recording and demonstrates for those who might have might have forgotten what a powerful improviser Sam Rivers was."

Kevin Le Gendre of Jazzwise commented: "there was a strong chemistry that underpinned this particular venture... Rivers, Holland and Altschul fulfilled the ideal of spontaneous composition insofar as the music moves freely in a number of different directions all the while retaining a sense of form because the players are so closely allied in the way they negotiate every twist and turn, responding to one another but also spurring each other on."

== Track listing ==
Composed by Sam Rivers.

1. "Expectation" – 6:45
2. "Vision" – 12:43
3. "Judgement" – 10:34
4. "Hope" – 7:13

== Personnel ==
- Sam Rivers – tenor saxophone, soprano saxophone, flute, piano
- Dave Holland – double bass
- Barry Altschul – drums
