= Emanation (album) =

Live album by Sam Rivers Trio
- Released: 2019
- Recorded: June 3, 1971
- Venue: Jazz Workshop, Boston
- Genre: Free jazz
- Label: NoBusiness; NBCD 118
- Producer: Danas Mikailionis, Ed Hazell, Valerij Anosov

Sam Rivers chronology
Lyon 29.03.1997 (2018)	Emanation (2019)	Zenith (2019)

Emanation is a live album by the Sam Rivers Trio, led by multi-instrumentalist and composer Rivers, and featuring double bassist Cecil McBee and drummer Norman Connors. It was recorded on June 3, 1971, at the Jazz Workshop in Boston, and was released in 2019 by NoBusiness Records as volume 1 of the Sam Rivers Archive Series.

The album is based on material selected from Rivers' massive recorded archives, which are curated by writer and producer Ed Hazell, who spent a year reviewing tapes with the goal of choosing the best recordings for release by NoBusiness Records. Regarding Emanation, Hazell reflected: "It's fascinating as an early example of what he was setting out to do... developing a characteristic voice for each instrument, letting the rhythmic feel be fluid and changing without any preagreement."

The same trio appears on the live album Streams, recorded in 1973, and released by Impulse! later that year.

== Reception ==
Professional ratings
Review scores
Source	Rating
All About Jazz	4/5 stars
The Free Jazz Collective	5/5 stars
Tom Hull – on the Web	A−

DownBeat's Suzanne Lorge stated that the album's two tracks "crackle with intensity," and wrote: "what starts with a simple (albeit out) melodic intro descends into cacophonic splendor before too long. But hidden in and among the squeals and screams are moments of quiet impressionistic beauty. It's a masterly display."

In a review for All About Jazz, John Sharpe commented that Rivers "creates form spontaneously, and showcases each of his instruments," and noted that "Whatever the conduit, Rivers continually reinvigorates his lines, working in broad arcs without a safety net, using licks and extemporized figures to relaunch himself and occasionally mirroring his accompanist."

Brian Marley of London Jazz News described the album as "an important document," and pointed out the key role of McBee and Connors, who "push and pull the music and spur Rivers on to ever greater heights, including yelps and exclamations when the ecstatic charge becomes too great and a musical instrument isn't capable of expressing what needs to be said."

Writing for The Free Jazz Collective, Paul Acquaro called the album "a fantastic beginning" to the Archive Series, with the trio "digging deeper and deeper" as the music progresses.

In an article for Point of Departure, Bill Shoemaker remarked: "Rivers' seemingly bottomless well of inventiveness is vividly on display... Even at this relatively early stage of developing set-long improvisations in which he played each of his four axes at length, Rivers had a real command of each and every moment, the considerable merits of McBee and Connors' contributions notwithstanding. If ever there was a recording that handsomely rewards committed listening, it is Emanation."

Dusted Magazine's Derek Taylor wrote: "Rivers leads with a tenor exploration at once extemporaneous and wholly deliberate with bass and then drums aligning to the brisk forward momentum. Numerous in-the-moment recalibrations ensue with Rivers seizing on and discarding melodic material at whim while stalwartly driving the music without overly dominating it."

Bill Meyer of Magnet called the album "essential," and stated: "Rivers moves easily between muscular saxophone, airy flute and stormy piano playing, sustaining a thread of invention that never goes slack."

Commenting for The New York City Jazz Record, Phil Freeman called Emanation a "totally unfettered performance" and "a crucial addition to the Sam Rivers catalogue."

Writing for Riot Material, Henry Cherry described the album as "superlative," and remarked: "Hearing [the music] in full scale is a monument to where jazz has landed in the 2010s. This music does ask a lot from the listener, but the trio deliver robustly upon that ask."

== Track listing ==
Composed by Sam Rivers.

1. "Emanation Part I" – 31:09
2. "Emanation Part II" – 45:32

== Personnel ==
- Sam Rivers – tenor saxophone, soprano saxophone, flute, piano
- Cecil McBee – double bass
- Norman Connors – drums
