= Paragon (Sam Rivers album) =

Studio album by Sam Rivers
- Released: 1977
- Recorded: April 18, 1977
- Studio: Davout Studio, Paris
- Genre: Free jazz
- Label: Fluid; 101
- Producer: Alain Wolfson, Christian Besnier

Sam Rivers chronology
Black Africa! Perugia (1977)	Paragon (1977)	The Tuba Trio Vols. 1-3 (1977)

Paragon is an album by Sam Rivers on which he is accompanied by double bassist Dave Holland and drummer Barry Altschul. It was recorded on April 18, 1977, at Davout Studio in Paris, and was released later that year by Fluid Records. In 2015, it was reissued as a digital download by Rivers's RivBea Music.

The trio was active from 1972 until 1978, and was influential in the New York loft jazz scene centered around Rivers' Studio Rivbea. Although the group toured and performed widely, it was not well documented on record, with the exception of this album, plus the Rivers album The Quest (1976) and Holland's Conference of the Birds (1973), which also included Anthony Braxton. In 2007, the trio reunited and recorded the music that was released in 2012 on the album Reunion: Live in New York. In 2020, NoBusiness Records released Ricochet, a live recording of the trio from 1978, as volume 3 of the label's Sam Rivers Archive Series.

== Reception ==
Professional ratings
Review scores
Source	Rating
AllMusic	4/5 stars
The Encyclopedia of Popular Music	3/5 stars
Tom Hull – on the Web	B+
The Virgin Encyclopedia of Jazz	3/5 stars

In a review for AllMusic, Rob Ferrier called Rivers "a giant thinker," and noted that his trio music is "the core of his musical thought." He wrote: "There aren't many who can hang, even in a supporting role. There certainly isn't room for other soloists. This is sweeping, grand, muscular music, as regular and jagged as a seismograph, or the jittering of a lie detector. Here, he's supported by two men perfectly suited for their roles... Fine musicians, here they are extensions of the music that pours from Rivers."

== Track listing ==
Composed by Sam Rivers.

1. "Ecstasy" – 5:38
2. "Bliss" – 6:23
3. "Rapture" – 5:10
4. "Tingle" – 7:28
5. "Paragon" – 12:15

== Personnel ==
- Sam Rivers – tenor saxophone, soprano saxophone, flute, piano
- Dave Holland – double bass
- Barry Altschul – drums
