= Crystals (Sam Rivers album) =

Studio album by Sam Rivers
- Released: 1974
- Recorded: March 4, 1974
- Studios: Generation Sound, New York
- Genre: Jazz
- Length: 40:30
- Label: Impulse!
- Producer: Ed Michel

Sam Rivers chronology
Hues (1973)	Crystals (1974)	Sizzle (1975)

Crystals is an album by Sam Rivers, released by Impulse! Records in 1974 in a stereo/quadraphonic format.

== Background ==
It had been over a decade since Ornette Coleman had worked with his Free Jazz Double Quartet, nine years since John Coltrane assembled his Ascension band, and six since the first Jazz Composers' Orchestra Association was formed and whose first records were issued (a couple of members of that band also performing with Rivers on this record) and the compositions for what eventually became Crystals were written between 1959 and 1972. They were finished as new elements came to him to fit them together conceptually.

The album was released by Impulse! in September 1974, and was out of print after a few years. It was re-released in CD form in 2002 (with Rivers' original liner notes), and available for three years through Universal Distribution.

The compositions were recorded over a period of five or six hours by an ensemble sometimes reported as 14 musicians: 3 trumpets, 2 trombones, tuba, 5 reeds, bass, and 2 drummers. Other musicians listed in the vinyl liner notes were present in rehearsals (and their contributions incorporated in the final results) but not the recording.

== Reception ==
Professional ratings
Review scores
Source	Rating
AllMusic	5/5 stars
The Rolling Stone Jazz Record Guide	5/5 stars

Jazz critic Thom Jurek wrote: “Musically, this is the mature Sam Rivers speaking from the wide base of his knowledge as a composer, improviser and conceptualist.”

== Track listing ==
1. "Exultation" – 8:25
2. "Tranquility" – 8:58
3. "Postlude" – 2:31
4. "Bursts" – 6:51
5. "Orb" – 9:36
6. "Earth Song" – 4:09

== Personnel ==
Including Rivers, this big band numbers 'sixty-four' musicians, including:

- Sam Rivers – saxophones, conductor
- Sinclair Acey – trumpet
- Ted Daniel – trumpet
- Richard Williams – trumpet
- Charles Greenlee – trombone
- Charles Stephens – trombone
- Joe Daley – trombone, tuba
- Roland Alexander – soprano and tenor saxophone, flute
- Fred Kelly – soprano and baritone saxophone, flute
- Joe Ferguson – alto, tenor & soprano saxophones, flute
- Paul Jeffrey – tenor saxophone, flute, clarinet, oboe, bassett horn, bassoon
- Gregory Maker – acoustic & electric bass violin
- Ronnie Boykins – bass guitar
- Harold Smith – drums, percussion
- Warren Smith – drums, percussion

Credits from AllMusic include 62 musicians (not including Maker):

Flugelhorn, trumpet

- Ahmed Abdullah
- Sinclair Acey
- Martin Banks
- Jothan Callins
- Teddy Daniel
- Joe Dupars
- Ronald Hampton
- Virgil Jones
- Don McIntosh
- Marvin "Hannibal" Peterson
- Michael Ridley
- Norman Spiller
- Charles Sullivan
- Clifford Thornton
- Richard Williams
- Yusef Yancey

Trombone

- Bill Campbell
- Ashley Fennell
- Charles Greenlee
- Vincent Holmes
- Grachan Moncur III
- Charles Stephens

Tuba

- Bob Stewart
- Howard Johnson
- Joe Daley

Horn

- Julius Watkins
- Richard Dunbar

Flute, saxophone

- Roland Alexander – flute, soprano and tenor saxophones
- Paul Jeffrey – flute, tenor saxophone
- Fred Kelly – flute, soprano, alto, and baritone saxophones
- Sam Rivers – flute, soprano and tenor saxophones

Woodwinds

- Bill Barron
- Hamiet Bluiett
- Anthony Braxton
- Ron Bridgewater
- Bobby Capers
- Robin Kenyatta
- Pat Patrick
- Bob Ralston
- Bill Saxton
- John Stubblefield
- James Ware
- Monty Waters
- Dave Young

Bass violin

- Ronnie Boykins
- Bob Cunningham
- Richard Davis
- Stafford James
- Hakim Jami
- Reggie Workman

Percussion

- Horace Arnold
- Art Blakey
- Roger Blank
- Sonny Brown
- Norman Connors
- Andrew Cyrille
- Steve Ellington
- Billy Hart
- Maurice McKinley
- Harold Smith
- Warren Smith – drums
- Steve Solder

Production

- Ken Druker – executive producer
- Bryan Koniarz – producer
- Ed Michel – producer
- Kevin Reeves – mastering
