= Undulation (album) =

Live album by Sam Rivers Quartet
- Released: 2021
- Recorded: May 17, 1981
- Venue: Florence, Italy
- Genre: Free jazz
- Length: 1:11:55
- Label: NoBusiness; NBCD 146
- Producer: Danas Mikailionis, Ed Hazell, Valerij Anosov

Sam Rivers chronology
| Braids (2020) | Undulation (2021) | Caldera (2022) |

Undulation is a live album by the Sam Rivers Quartet, led by multi-instrumentalist and composer Rivers, and featuring guitarist Jerry Byrd, bass guitarist Rael-Wesley Grant, and drummer Steve Ellington. Consisting of a single performance lasting over an hour, it was recorded on May 17, 1981, in Florence, Italy, and was released in 2021 by NoBusiness Records as volume 5 of the Sam Rivers Archive Series.

The Rivers Quartet with this lineup also appeared on Crosscurrent: Live at Jazz Unité (Blue Marge, 1981 [1982]). Undulation is based on material selected from Rivers' massive recorded archives, which are curated by writer and producer Ed Hazell, who spent a year reviewing tapes with the goal of choosing the best recordings for release by NoBusiness Records.

== Reception ==
Professional ratings
Review scores
| Source | Rating |
|---|---|
| All About Jazz | 3.5/5 stars |
| All About Jazz | 4/5 stars |
| The Free Jazz Collective | 5/5 stars |
| Tom Hull – on the Web | A− |

In a review for All About Jazz, John Sharpe wrote: "What the set achieves is to showcase Rivers' enormous range and prowess in free flowing dialogue... Rivers is an important figure in the history of the music and this valuable release helps fills in some of the blanks in a somewhat neglected mid-career period." AAJ's John Eyles stated: "the album is full of variety, with all four players having ample time to solo, their solos being integrated into the overall flow of the music, so never sounding bolted-on or routine... To date, all volumes of this series have been so impressive that the notion of selecting a 'best' one has been laughable. Undulations maintains that run and re-emphasises the quality of them all."

David Grundy of Point of Departure commented: "We can... be glad that the Lithuanian label continues to do such sterling work: Undulation is ample evidence of Rivers' power, present on virtually anything he touched, and an important documentation of a little-known chapter of his work."

Writing for The New York City Jazz Record, George Kanzler suggested that the album demonstrates the fact that "Rivers can... be described as inside-outside, never a completely free player, often circling back to the forms of bebop: extended chord changes, elaborations of pop song melodies... [he] veers from free blowing largely to a strong suggestion of tunes and chord changes."

Dusted Magazine's Derek Taylor remarked: "Rivers really digs into the grooves drafted by his colleagues and brings a sustained level of energy and incisiveness that in turn inspires them. The music is sequenced and titled to make access to shifts in instrumentation instant if desired."

Bruce Lee Gallanter of the Downtown Music Gallery wrote: "The quartet is in fine form here, sprawling, free, intense, just the way all or most of Rivers' previous (and future) trios/quartets always were/are... [a] jubilant feeling runs throughout this entire set & disc so why not join in and go along for the ride. OUT-standing as always!"

The Free Jazz Collective's Tom Burris noted "the intensity and fascinating interplay between the musicians," and stated: "Hard to describe how intense this collaboration gets without it sounding like superlative overkill, so I'll just say WOW... One of the best sets in the box, for sure."

== Track listing ==
Composed by Sam Rivers.

1. "Tenor saxophone section I" – 11:17
2. "Tenor saxophone solo" – 4:26
3. "Tenor saxophone section II" – 5:37
4. "Drum solo" – 8:14
5. "Piano solo" – 5:52
6. "Piano section I" – 4:21
7. "Piano section II" – 6:19
8. "Guitar solo" – 5:25
9. "Flute section I" – 4:53
10. "Flute solo" – 4:08
11. "Flute section II" – 2:07
12. "Bass solo" – 5:21
13. "Flute section III" – 4:55

== Personnel ==
- Sam Rivers – tenor saxophone, flute, piano
- Jerry Byrd – guitar
- Rael-Wesley Grant – electric bass guitar
- Steve Ellington – drums
