= Steve Ellington =

American jazz drummer (1941–2013)

- Born: Bradford Steven Ellington; July 26, 1941; Atlanta, Georgia, U.S.
- Died: May 22, 2013 (aged 71) Montgomery, Alabama, U.S.
- Genre: Jazz
- Occupation: Musician
- Instrument: Drums
- Years active: mid-1950s – 2010s
- Relatives: Duke Ellington

Bradford Steven Ellington (July 26, 1941 – March 22, 2013) was an American jazz drummer. Recording primarily as a sideman through the 1960s, notably with multi-instrumentalists Sam Rivers and Rahsaan Roland Kirk, he also led his own bands for a time, first in the mid-1960s, and later, in the late 1980s. He was related to pianist and composer Duke Ellington.

== Biography ==
Steve Ellington picked up the drums when he was four years old and played with Ray Charles when he was nine years old. In the latter half of the 1950s, he played with Charles Brown, George Adams, and Duke Pearson. He studied for one year at the New England Conservatory of Music in 1961–1962, where he played with Sam Rivers, and then worked with June Christy, Joe Castro, and Hampton Hawes. He began playing with Rahsaan Roland Kirk in 1964, with whom he would perform and record through 1970; aside from Kirk, he played as a sideman himself with Jackie McLean, Chet Baker, Stanley Turrentine, and Mose Allison. Concomitantly, he led his own band in 1965–1966, whose sidemen were Woody Shaw, Walter Davis Jr., Wilbur Ware, and C. Sharpe.

In the 1970s, Ellington worked with Billy Eckstine, Brick Jazz Funk Fusion, Hampton Hawes, Art Farmer, Freddy Cole, Freddie Hubbard, Ike Isaacs, Maxine Sullivan, Harry "Sweets" Edison, Eddie "Lockjaw" Davis, and Dan Wall. He returned to work with Rivers in 1980–1982, played with Sonny Stitt and Dave Holland, thereafter putting together a new ensemble of his own, which was active from 1985 to 1990. He was the drummer for Michel Petrucciani's trio from 1988 to 1990, and in the 1990s, worked with Hal Galper, Steve Grossman, James Moody, and Johnny Griffin.

Ellington died in Montgomery, Alabama, at the age of 71. He had been dealing with cancer for about two years.

== Discography ==
=== As sideman ===
With Art Farmer

- On the Road (Contemporary, 1976)

With Hal Galper

- Live at Port Townsend '91 (Double-Time, 1991)
- Let's Call This That (Double-Time, 1999)

With Hampton Hawes

- The Green Leaves of Summer (Contemporary, 1964)

With Dave Holland

- Jumpin' In (ECM, 1984)

With Roland Kirk

- Gifts & Messages (Mercury, 1964)

With Piero Odorici

- Panarea (Jazz Today, 1997)

With Sam Rivers

- A New Conception (Blue Note, 1966 [1967])
- Dimensions & Extensions (Blue Note, 1967 [1986])
- Crosscurrent: Live at Jazz Unité (Blue Marge, 1981 [1982])
- Undulation (NoBusiness, 1981 [2021]) – Rivers Archive Series volume 5

== See also ==
- Duke Ellington
