= Joseph Daley (jazz musician) =

American jazz musician (1949–2025)

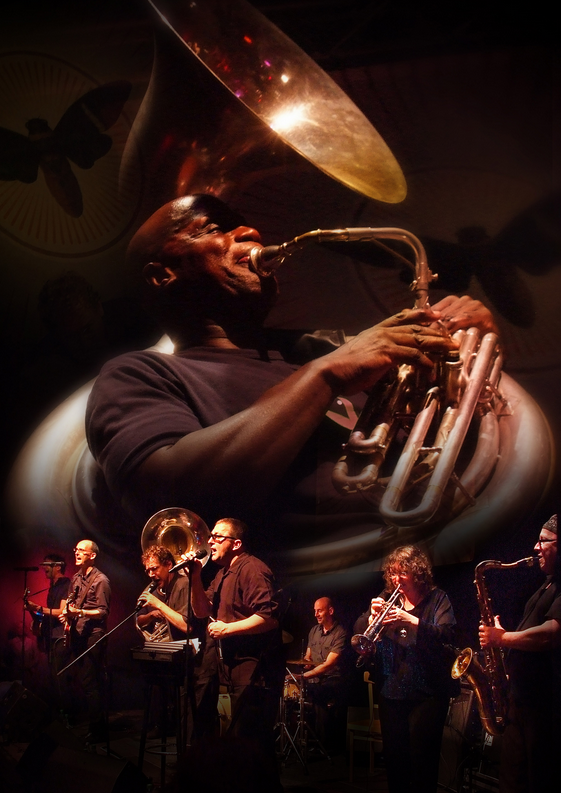
- Daley with Hazmat Modine

Background information
- Born: August 6, 1949; New York York, U.S.
- Died: August 3, 2025 (aged 75)
- Genres: Jazz
- Occupations: Composer, musician, educator
- Instruments: Tuba, Trombone, Euphonium
- Website: jodamusic.com

Joseph Peter Daley (August 6, 1949 – August 3, 2025) was an American educator, jazz musician, composer and arranger known for his work with the tuba, trombone and euphonium.

== Early life and educator ==
Born in Harlem, Daley, who was of African American heritage, graduated The High School of Music & Art in 1967. He then continued to the Manhattan School of Music where he earned a bachelor's degree in Performance in 1972 and a master's degree in Music Education in 1973.

From 1972 to 1976, Joseph worked for the New York City Board of Education as Band Director at Wadleigh JHS 88 Harlem and associate director of Manhattan Borough-Wide Band.

From 1976 to 2005, he worked for the Englewood New Jersey Board of Education at Janis Dismus Middle School and Dwight Morrow High School.

Listing of various assignments from 1976 to 2005: Concert Band Director, Marching Band director, Choral Director, Music Appreciation Teacher, Jazz Ensemble Director, Yamaha Electronic Keyboard Lab Teacher, Music Theory and Harmony Teacher, Subject Area Leader.

== Performing musician ==
During his career as an educator, he was also involved in jazz as a composer, arranger and performer, working with other jazz musicians such as Monguito Santamaria, Howard Johnson, Taj Mahal, Gil Evans. Sam Rivers, Jayne Cortez, Carla Bley, Edward Vesala, George Gruntz, Muhal Richard Abrams, Phil Haynes, Bill Cole, Ellery Eskelin, Alan Silva, Assif Tsahar, Dave Douglas, Taylor Ho Bynum, Joe Fonda, Bill Dixon, Reggie Nicholson, Warren Smith, Natalie Merchant, Anthony Braxton, Jason Kao Hwang, Marty Ehrlich and Michael Gregory Jackson. His interest in musicology and music from around the world has resulted in collaborations with the Tuvan throat singers of Huun Huur Tu, Benin, Africa's Gangbe Brass Band, Kronos String Quartet and Natalie Merchant.

Joseph was a member of ensembles large and small including Howard Johnson and GRAVITY, Liberation Music Orchestra, Ebony Brass Quintet, Far East Side Band and Earth Tones Ensemble.

Joseph toured and recorded with Hazmat Modine and the improvisational Tuba Trio.

== Composer ==
While Daley composed music virtually all of his life, his first major published work was the ambitious and well received The Seven Deadly Sins, published as an album on CD in 2011 along with a tribute to his deceased brother Ballade for the Fallen African Warrior.

In 2013 he followed up with The Seven Heavenly Virtues, then in 2014 Portraits: Wind, Thunder and Love which includes the multimovement suite Wispercussion: Five Portraits of Warren Smith and in 2015, The Tuba Trio Chronicles.

== Death ==
Daley died on August 3, 2025, at the age of 75.

== Awards and honors ==
- National Endowment for the Arts Award for Music Composition, NJ Outstanding Teacher Recognition Award, MacDowell Colony Fellow, Geraldine R. Dodge Foundation Fellow, Music Omni Fellow.
- The New York City Jazz Record Magazine (January, 2012) listed Joseph Daley and The Earth Tones Ensemble "Best of 2011" in Debut and Large Ensemble categories for his debut album The Seven Deadly Sins.

== Discography ==
=== As leader ===
- The Seven Deadly Sins (Jaro, 2010)
- The Seven Heavenly Virtues (JoDaMusic, 2013)
- Portraits: Wind, Thunder and Love (JoDaMusic, 2014)
- The Tuba Trio Chronicles (JoDaMusic, 2015)
- The Seven Heavenly Virtues/ The Seven Deadly Sins (JoDaMusic, 2019)
- The Tuba Trio Chronicles Volume 2 (JoDaMusic, 2023)

=== As sideman ===
With Bill Cole

- Untempered Trio (Shadrack, 1992)
- Live in Greenfield Massachusetts November 20, 1999 (Boxholder, 2000)
- Duets & Solos Vol. 2 (Boxholder, 2001)
- Seasoning the Greens (Boxholder, 2002)
- Proverbs for Sam (Boxholder, 2008)
- The Living Lives Not Among the Dead. Why Seek It There? (2018)
- Margaret and Katie (2022)

With Gil Evans

- Svengali (Atlantic, 1973)
- There Comes a Time (RCA, 1976)
- Plays the Music of Jimi Hendrix (Bluebird, 2002)

With Charlie Haden

- Dream Keeper (DIW, 1990)
- The Montreal Tapes (Verve, 1999)
- Not in Our Name (Verve, 2005)
- Time/Life (Impulse!, 2016)

With Howard Johnson

- Gravity!!! (Verve, 1996)
- Right Now! (Verve, 1997)
- Testimony (Tuscarora, 2017)

With Hazmat Modine

- Bahamut (Barbes, 2006)
- Cicada (Barbes, 2011)
- Live (Jaro, 2014)
- Box of Breath (Jaro, 2019)
- Bonfire (Jaro, 2023)

With Sam Rivers

- Crystals (Impulse!, 1974)
- Black Africa! Perugia (Horo, 1977)
- Black Africa! Villalago (Horo, 1977)
- Flutes! (Circle, 1977)
- Jazz of the Seventies/Una Muy Bonita (Circle, 1977)
- Waves (Tomato, 1979)
- Inspiration (BMG, 1999)
- Culmination (BMG, 1999)
- Zenith (NoBusiness, 2019)
- Braids (NoBusiness, 2020)
- Sam Rivers Archive Series (NoBusiness, 2023)

With others

- Muhal Richard Abrams, Blu Blu Blu (Black Saint, 1991)
- Carla Bley, Social Studies (WATT/ECM, 1981)
- Anthony Braxton, Composition No. 19 (New Braxton House, 2011)
- Anthony Braxton, Composition No. 146 (New Braxton House, 2014)
- Taylor Ho Bynum, Madeleine Dreams (Firehouse 12, 2009)
- Taylor Ho Bynum, Other Stories (482 Music, 2005)
- Jayne Cortez, Unsubmissive Blues (Bola, 1980)
- Bill Dixon, 17 Musicians in Search of a Sound: Darfur (AUM Fidelity, 2008)
- Dave Douglas, Witness (Bluebird, 2001)
- Marty Ehrlich, A Trumpet in the Morning (New World, 2013)
- Ellery Eskelin, Figure of Speech (Soul Note, 1993)
- Ellery Eskelin, Ramifications (hatOLOGY, 2000)
- Joe Fonda, Loaded Basses (CIMP, 2006)
- George Gruntz, First Prize (Enja, 1989)
- George Gruntz, Sins'n Wins'n Funs (TCB, 1996)
- Joel Harrison, Infinite Possibility (Sunnyside, 2013)
- Phil Haynes, 4 Horns & What? (Open Minds, 1991)
- Jason Kao Hwang, Burning Bridge (Innova, 2012)
- Jason Kao Hwang, Blood (True Sound, 2018)
- Michael Gregory Jackson, Endogeny/Exogamy (Ethnicity Against the Error, 2015)
- Chaka Khan, Naughty (Warner Bros., 1980)
- Material, Reality (Axiom, 1991)
- Material, The Third Power (Axiom, 1991)
- Natalie Merchant, Leave Your Sleep (Nonesuch, 2010)
- Santana, Supernatural (Arista/BMG, 1999)
- Alan Silva, Alan Silva & the Sound Visions Orchestra (Eremite, 2001)
- Alan Silva, H.Con.Res.57/Treasure Box (Eremite, 2003)
- Warren Smith, Old News Borrowed Blues (Engine, 2009)
- Taj Mahal, Happy Just to Be Like I Am (CBS, 1971)
- Taj Mahal, The Real Thing (Columbia, 1971)
- Assif Tsahar, The Hollow World (Hopscotch, 1999)
- Edward Vesala, Heavy Life (Leo, 1980)
