= Monty Waters =

American jazz musician

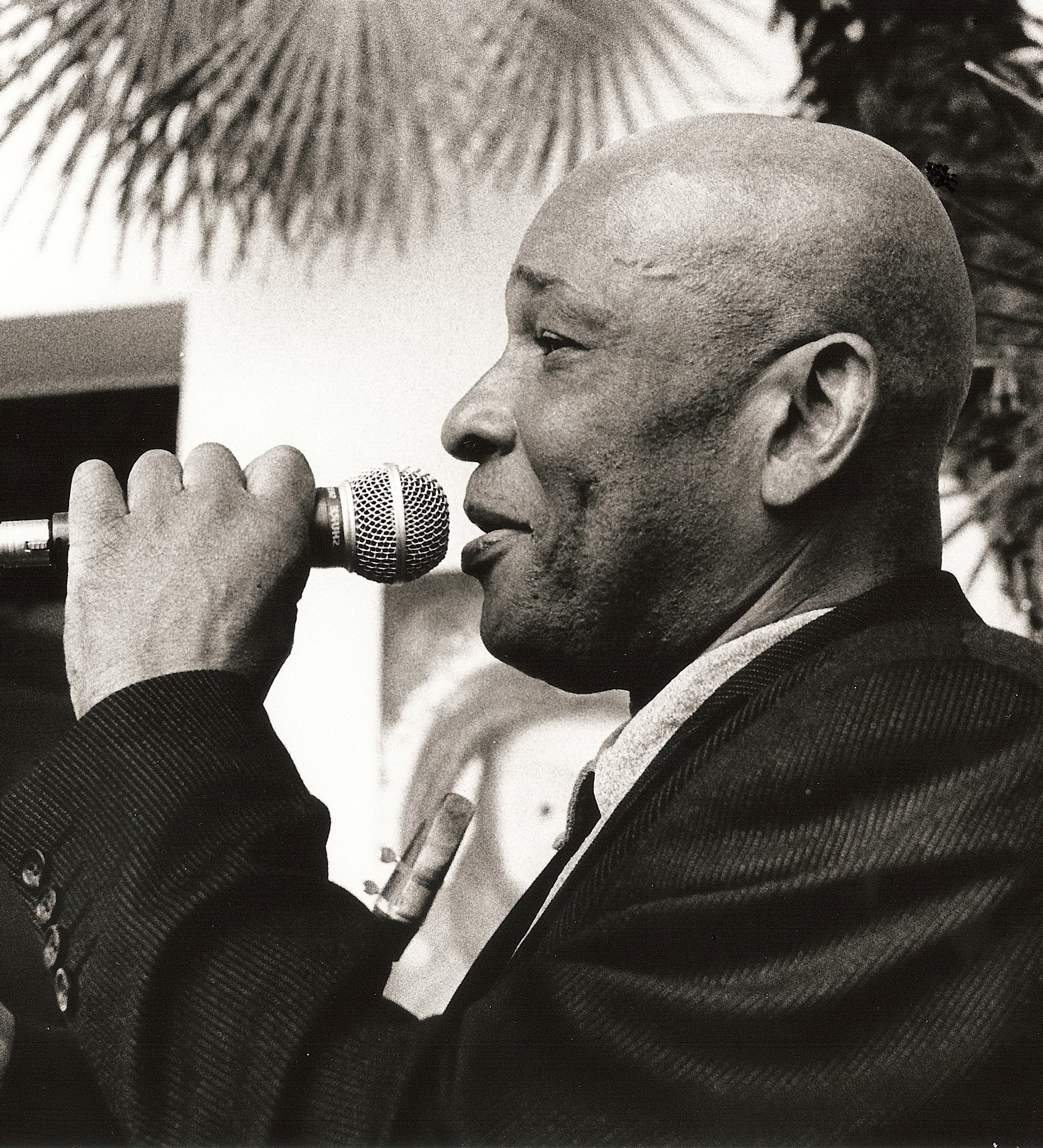
Monty Waters at the Palmenhaus, Munich, Germany 1999.

Monville Charles Waters (April 14, 1938 – December 23, 2008), known as Monty Waters, was an American jazz saxophonist, flautist and singer.

== Early life ==
Monville Charles Waters was born in Modesto, California. He studied at Modesto High School where he was a member of the American football team and ran hurdles. After graduating from high school in 1956, he attended a year of junior college before moving to Los Angeles.

== Career ==
While living in Los Angeles, Waters performed as a backing saxophonist for musicians including B.B. King, James Brown, Little Richard, and Fats Domino. He later moved to San Francisco seeking better opportunities for an R&B career, and started his own big band and quartet.

In 1968, he left California for New York City. He later spoke of his surprise upon seeing the music scene there: "I'd never seen so many talented, hard-working, earnest people in my life. All the best were there. You really got to respect them".

== Discography ==
=== As leader ===
- The Black Cat (Whynot, 1975)
- Hot House: Live in Paris Duc de Lombards Vol. 1 (with Larry Porter, Stafford James, Ronnie Burrage)
- New York Calling: Live in Paris Vol. 2 (with Larry Porter, Stafford James, Ronnie Burrage, Tom Nicholas)
- Jazzoetry (with Paulo Cardoso and Tom Nicholas)
- Monty Waters & Titus Waldenfels: Favourite Things
- Monty Waters & Titus Waldenfels: Full Blast (with Jürgen Schneider)
- Monty Waters & L'ubo Samo Quintet: Moonlight in Slovakia (with Titus Waldenfels)
- Embryo : Turn Peace
- Götz Tangerding Trio feat. Sheila Jordan : Jazztracks

=== As sideman ===
With Billy Higgins

- The Soldier (Red, 1979)

With Joe Lee Wilson

- Shout for Trane (1976)

With Sam Rivers

- Crystals (1974)

With Ronnie Boykins

- The Will Come, Is Now (1975)
