= Zenith (Sam Rivers album) =

Live album by Sam Rivers Quintet
- Released: 2019
- Recorded: November 6, 1977
- Venues: Jazztage Berliner 1977, Philharmonie, Berlin, Germany
- Genre: Free jazz
- Length: 53:19
- Labels: NoBusiness; NBCD 124
- Producers: Danas Mikailionis, Ed Hazell, Valerij Anosov

Sam Rivers chronology
Emanation (2019)	Zenith (2019)	Ricochet (2020)

Zenith is a live album by the Sam Rivers Quintet, led by multi-instrumentalist and composer Rivers, and featuring tubist and euphonium player Joe Daley, double bassist Dave Holland, and drummers Barry Altschul and Charlie Persip. Consisting of a single 53-minute track, it was recorded on November 6, 1977, at Jazztage Berliner 1977, held at the Philharmonie in Berlin, Germany, and was released in 2019 by NoBusiness Records as volume 2 of the Sam Rivers Archive Series.

The album is based on material selected from Rivers' massive recorded archives, which are curated by writer and producer Ed Hazell, who spent a year reviewing tapes with the goal of choosing the best recordings for release by NoBusiness Records.

== Reception ==
Professional ratings
Review scores
Source	Rating
All About Jazz	4/5 stars
All About Jazz	4.5/5 stars
The Free Jazz Collective	5/5 stars
Tom Hull – on the Web	A−

In a review for All About Jazz, John Sharpe wrote: "Even if this line up seems to have been a one off, it convinces as a totally integrated unit. The album is more than a match for those issued during this period, and comes highly recommended to anyone curious about Rivers' legacy."

Olie Brice of London Jazz News stated that Rivers's "free music as a bandleader was always unusual in incorporating swing, odd time grooves and abstraction in a completely organic flow," and commented: "This album is a prime example of that – five great improvisers developing an ever-changing piece of music without any limitations of genre."

Dusted Magazine's Derek Taylor noted that the music "follows Rivers' usual framework of episodic segments sequenced around his four primary instruments... Sections for the other players are threaded in as well... the recording is both clear and crisp with solid spatial depth and balance between the players... The audience is largely silent rapt throughout, a complimentary reflection of the band's concerted ability to keep eyes and ears absorbed en mass[sic]."

Writing for Point of Departure, Kevin Whitehead wrote: "The virtue of Sam's episodic sets is that they'd venture all over, from the ferocious to the pastoral, the dense to the airy, playing to their strengths in no fixed order or combination. With four musicians on his wavelength: now that is something to hear."

In an article for JazzWord, Ken Waxman stated: "Intense from beginning to end, the one track... gives Rivers ample space to display his seesawing style on tenor and soprano saxophones, flute and piano... With the bassist's sympathetic strums framing him Rivers' tenor saxophone moves through split tone and glossolalia... Yet as Daley's plunger whinnies stunningly contrast with Rivers' staccato snarls and doits, the sliding narrative picks up additional power from Holland's walking pumps and hand-clapping drum beats that owe as much to bebop as free jazz."

Gary Chapin of The Free Jazz Collective called the opening section of the piece "a tenor tour de force for Rivers... a frenetic pulseless rant, with the two drums providing a power source," and noted that "Rivers is such a strong blues-based player that he will always come back to melody." Regarding the closing section, he commented: "How can I forget what an extraordinary piano player Rivers is? But I do. I forget. And then I'm reminded."

Writer Raul Da Gama stated that the album features "music that is both mysterious and moving in its valedictory pathos," and remarked: "The music of Zenith is... a sort of pinnacle of the improvisations of Sam Rivers. The superbly elegant interplay between Mr Rivers' horns and the gilded growling Joseph Daley's brass instruments suggest that Mr Rivers' music had, somehow [here] reached a high-point of his musical conceptualisation."

== Track listing ==
All tracks are written by Sam Rivers.

No.	Title	Length
1.	"Universal Message"	53:19
Total length:		53:19

== Personnel ==
- Sam Rivers – tenor saxophone, soprano saxophone, flute, piano
- Joe Daley – tuba, euphonium
- Dave Holland – double bass, cello
- Barry Altschul – drums
- Charlie Persip – drums
