= Contrasts (Sam Rivers album) =

Studio album by Sam Rivers
- Released: 1980
- Recorded: December 1979
- Studio: Tonstudio Bauer; Ludwigsburg, West Germany
- Genre: Jazz
- Length: 43:10
- Label: ECM; ECM 1162
- Producer: Manfred Eicher

Sam Rivers chronology
Waves (1978)	Contrasts (1980)	Crosscurrent (1981)

Contrasts is an album by American jazz saxophonist Sam Rivers, recorded in December 1979 and released on ECM Records the following year. The quartet features trombonist George E. Lewis and rhythm section Dave Holland and Thurman Barker.

== Reception ==
The AllMusic review by Scott Yanow stated, "The seven Rivers originals, although sometimes having colorful melodies, are quite complex. However, the intriguing and very alert interplay between the brilliant musicians makes the music seem fairly logical and worth exploring by adventurous listeners."

Professional ratings
Review scores
Source	Rating
AllMusic	4/5 stars
The Rolling Stone Jazz Record Guide	4/5 stars

== Track listing ==
All tracks are written by Sam Rivers.

Side one
No.	Title	Length
1.	"Circles"	4:10
2.	"Zip"	4:42
3.	"Solace"	6:54
4.	"Verve"	7:09

Side two
No.	Title	Length
1.	"Dazzle"	9:12
2.	"Images"	3:48
3.	"Lines"	7:15

== Personnel ==
- Sam Rivers – tenor saxophone, soprano saxophone, flute
- George E. Lewis – trombone
- Dave Holland – bass
- Thurman Barker – drums, marimba
