= Hues (album) =

Live album by Sam Rivers
- Released: 1974
- Recorded: February 13 & 14, 1971, October 27, 1972, August 3 & November 10, 1973
- Genre: Jazz
- Length: 40:49
- Label: Impulse!
- Producer: Ed Michael

Sam Rivers chronology
| Streams (1973) | Hues (1974) | Crystals (1974) |

Hues is a live album by American jazz saxophonist Sam Rivers featuring performances recorded between 1971 and 1973 and released on the Impulse! label.

== Reception ==
Professional ratings
Review scores
| Source | Rating |
|---|---|
| AllMusic | 4/5 stars |
| The Rolling Stone Jazz Record Guide | 4/5 stars |

The AllMusic review by Andrew Hamilton stated, "Hues is thoroughly enjoyable and should be reissued".

== Track listing ==
All compositions by Sam Rivers

1. "Amber" - 4:26
2. "Turquoise" - 4:01
3. "Rose" - 5:13
4. "Chartreuse" - 3:17
5. "Mauve" - 4:17
6. "Indigo" - 1:28
7. "Onyx" - 4:04
8. "Topaz" - 4:02
9. "Ivory Black" - 4:13
10. "Violet" - 5:48

- Recorded at The Jazz Workshop in Boston, Massachusetts, on February 13 (tracks 1–3) & 14 (track 4), 1971, at Oakland University in Rochester, Michigan, on October 27, 1972 (tracks 5 & 6), at the Molde Jazz Festival in Molde, Norway, on August 3, 1973 (tracks 7 & 8), and at Battell Chapel, Yale University in New Haven, Connecticut, on November 10, 1973 (track 9 & 10)

== Personnel ==
- Sam Rivers - soprano saxophone, tenor saxophone, flute, piano
- Arild Andersen (track 7 & 8), Richard Davis (tracks 5 & 6), Cecil McBee (track 1–4, 9 & 10) - bass
- Barry Altschul (tracks 7–10), Norman Connors (tracks 1–4), Warren Smith (tracks 5 & 6) - drums, percussion
