= Sam Rivers / Dave Holland Vol. 2 =

Studio album by Dave Holland & Sam Rivers
- Released: February 18, 1976
- Recorded: December 9, 1975
- Studio: Big Apple; New York City
- Genre: Jazz
- Length: 47:13
- Label: Improvising Artists
- Producer: Paul Bley

Dave Holland chronology
| Dave Holland / Sam Rivers (1976) | Sam Rivers / Dave Holland Vol. 2 (1976) | Gateway (1976) |

Sam Rivers chronology
| Dave Holland / Sam Rivers (1976) | Sam Rivers / Dave Holland Vol. 2 (1976) | The Quest (1976) |

Sam Rivers / Dave Holland Vol. 2 is an album by American jazz saxophonist Sam Rivers and English double-bassist Dave Holland featuring performances recorded in 1976 and released on the Improvising Artists label.

== Reception ==
Professional ratings
Review scores
| Source | Rating |
|---|---|
| AllMusic | 3/5 stars |
| The Encyclopedia of Popular Music | 4/5 stars |
| The Rolling Stone Jazz & Blues Album Guide | 4/5 stars |

The AllMusic review by Scott Yanow stated, "When Sam Rivers met up with bassist Dave Holland for a set of duets, he decided to record two LPs and play a different instrument on each of the sidelong pieces... Since tenor is easily Rivers's strongest ax, this set (which has now been reissued on CD) is of somewhat limited interest yet is generally successful. The flute piece has several different sections that keep both the musicians and listeners interested, while Rivers's piano feature is quite intense; he leaves few notes unplayed."

== Track listing ==
All tracks are written by Sam Rivers.

Side one
| No. | Title | Length |
|---|---|---|
| 1. | "Ripples" | 23:49 |

Side two
| No. | Title | Length |
|---|---|---|
| 1. | "Deluge" | 23:23 |
| Total length: | | 47:12 |

== Personnel ==
- Sam Rivers – flute (“Ripples”), piano (“Deluge”)
- Dave Holland – double bass
