= Tangens (album) =

Live album by Sam Rivers and Alexander von Schlippenbach
- Released: 1998
- Recorded: November 8, 1997
- Venues: Total Music Meeting, Podewil, Berlin
- Genre: Free jazz
- Length: 1:10:03
- Labels: FMP; CD 99
- Producer: Jost Gebers

Sam Rivers chronology
Portrait (1997)	Tangens (1998)	Eight Day Journal (1998)

Tangens is a live album by saxophonist and flutist Sam Rivers and pianist Alexander von Schlippenbach. It was recorded on November 8, 1997, at the Total Music Meeting held at the Podewil in Berlin, and was released in 1998 by the FMP label. In 2015, it was reissued as a digital download by Rivers's RivBea Music.

== Reception ==
Professional ratings
Review scores
Source	Rating
AllMusic	4/5 stars
The Penguin Guide to Jazz	3.5/4 stars
Tom Hull – on the Web	B+

In a review for AllMusic, Thom Jurek wrote: "This set transcends so much of what is currently on the scene and passes for improvisation: It expresses emotion, transfers it to listeners, and offers them places in the text -- of music -- to find themselves and consider their own, very necessary places in this communication. Tangens is tender, beautiful, and edifying music by two empathic giants."

The authors of The Penguin Guide to Jazz Recordings called the album "fascinating," and stated: "The five improvisations documented here are like nothing else from the time, and are completely riveting from start to finish."

Len Bukowski of Coda noted that the musicians engage in "a most fluent conversation," and commented: "Both musicians challenge each other in what could perhaps be called 'avant cutting contests'; the listener is the sure winner."

== Track listing ==
Composed by Sam Rivers and Alexander von Schlippenbach.

1. "Tangens Alpha" – 6:26
2. "Tangens Beta" – 31:47
3. "Tangens Gamma" – 14:58
4. "Tangens Delta" – 7:08
5. "Tangens Epsilon" – 9:48

== Personnel ==
- Sam Rivers – tenor saxophone, soprano saxophone, flute
- Alexander von Schlippenbach – piano
