= Dave Holland / Sam Rivers =

Studio album by Dave Holland & Sam Rivers
- Released: February 17, 1976
- Recorded: December 9, 1975
- Studio: Big Apple; New York City
- Genre: Jazz
- Length: 38:27
- Label: Improvising Artists
- Producer: Paul Bley

Dave Holland chronology
Conference of the Birds (1972)	Dave Holland / Sam Rivers (1976)	Sam Rivers / Dave Holland Vol. 2 (1976)

Sam Rivers chronology
Sizzle (1975)	Dave Holland / Sam Rivers (1976)	Sam Rivers / Dave Holland Vol. 2 (1976)

Dave Holland / Sam Rivers is an album by American jazz saxophonist Sam Rivers and English double-bassist Dave Holland, recorded on December 9, 1975, and released on Improvising Artists early the following year.

== Reception ==
Professional ratings
Review scores
Source	Rating
AllMusic	4.5/5 stars
The Encyclopedia of Popular Music	4/5 stars
The Penguin Guide to Jazz	3.5/4 stars
The Rolling Stone Jazz Record Guide	5/5 stars

The AllMusic review by Scott Yanow stated, "Rivers' adventurous solos and interplay with the virtuosic Holland make this CD of interest to listeners with open ears toward the avant-garde, despite the LP-length playing time."

The authors of The Penguin Guide to Jazz Recordings called the album "a finely balanced duo performance which reunites the more interesting axis of Holland's Conference of the Birds quartet... An intriguing album, strongly recommended for anyone who found the ECM quartet compelling."

== Track listing ==
All music is composed by Sam Rivers.

Side one
No.	Title	Length
1.	"Waterfall"	17:08

Side two
No.	Title	Length
1.	"Cascade"	21:19
Total length:		38:27

== Personnel ==
- Sam Rivers – soprano saxophone (“Waterfall”), tenor saxophone (“Cascade”)
- Dave Holland – double bass
