= Fuchsia Swing Song =

Studio album by Sam Rivers
- Released: Early April 1965
- Recorded: December 11, 1964
- Studio: Van Gelder, Englewood Cliffs, NJ
- Genre: Jazz
- Length: 39:00 original LP; 69:24 CD reissue
- Label: Blue Note; BST 84184
- Producer: Alfred Lion

Sam Rivers chronology
Fuchsia Swing Song (1965)	Contours (1965)

Alternative cover
- 1995 Japanese CD (TOCJ-4184)

Fuchsia Swing Song is the debut album by American saxophonist Sam Rivers recorded in 1964 and released on the Blue Note label. The album was reissued on CD in 1995, and again in 2003 as part of the "Connoisseur Series" (limited edition series) including four alternate takes as bonus tracks.

== Reception ==
The AllMusic review by Thom Jurek stated, "By the time of his debut, Rivers had been deep under the influence of Coltrane and [Ornette] Coleman, but wasn't willing to give up the blues just yet. Hence the sound on Fuchsia Swing Song is one of an artist who is at once very self-assured, and in transition... This is a highly recommended date. Rivers never played quite like this again".

Professional ratings
Review scores
Source	Rating
AllMusic	4.5/5 stars
DownBeat	4/5 stars
The Encyclopedia of Popular Music	4/5 stars
The Penguin Guide to Jazz Recordings	4/4 stars
The Rolling Stone Jazz Record Guide	4/5 stars

== Track listing ==
All compositions by Sam Rivers.

1. "Fuchsia Swing Song" – 6:03
2. "Downstairs Blues Upstairs" – 5:33
3. "Cyclic Episode" – 6:57
4. "Luminous Monolith" – 6:31
5. "Beatrice" – 6:13
6. "Ellipsis" – 7:43

Bonus tracks on CD reissue:

7. "Luminous Monolith" [Alternate Take] – 6:39
8. "Downstairs Blues Upstairs" [First Alternate Take] – 8:09
9. "Downstairs Blues Upstairs" [Second Alternate Take] – 7:47
10. "Downstairs Blues Upstairs" [Third Alternate Take] – 7:49

== Personnel ==
- Sam Rivers – tenor saxophone
- Jaki Byard – piano
- Ron Carter – bass
- Tony Williams – drums
