= Sizzle (album) =

Studio album by Sam Rivers
- Released: 1976
- Recorded: December 9, 1975
- Genre: Jazz
- Length: 43:50
- Label: Impulse!

Sam Rivers chronology
Crystals (1974)	Sizzle (1976)	Dave Holland / Sam Rivers (1976)

Sizzle is an album by American jazz saxophonist Sam Rivers featuring performances recorded in 1975 and released on the Impulse! label.

== Reception ==
The AllMusic review by Michael G. Nastos stated, "Funky with electric touches. Fierce".

Professional ratings
Review scores
Source	Rating
AllMusic	2/5 stars
The Rolling Stone Jazz Record Guide	4/5 stars

== Track listing ==
All compositions by Sam Rivers

1. "Dawn" - 12:38
2. "Flare" - 8:53
3. "Flame" - 12:20
4. "Scud" - 9:59

- Recorded at Generation Sound Studios in New York City on December 9, 1975

== Personnel ==
- Sam Rivers - soprano saxophone, tenor saxophone, flute, piano
- Ted Dunbar - guitar
- Dave Holland - bass, cello
- Barry Altschul - drums
- Warren Smith - drums, vibes, tympani
