= Portrait (Sam Rivers album) =

Live album by Sam Rivers
- Released: 1997
- Recorded: June 18, 1995
- Venue: Workshop Freie Musik, Akademie der Künste, Berlin
- Genre: Free jazz
- Length: 1:16:29
- Label: FMP; CD 82
- Producer: Jost Gebers

Sam Rivers chronology
Concept (1997)	Portrait (1997)	Tangens (1998)

Portrait is a live solo album by the saxophonist, flutist, and pianist Sam Rivers. With nine original works, it was recorded on June 18, 1995, at the Workshop Freie Musik held at the Akademie der Künste in Berlin, and was released in 1997 by the FMP label. In 2015, it was reissued as a digital download by Rivers's RivBea Music.

== Reception ==
Professional ratings
Review scores
Source	Rating
AllMusic	4/5 stars
The Penguin Guide to Jazz	4/4 stars
Tom Hull – on the Web	B+

In a review for AllMusic, John Bush wrote that Rivers "finds a distinctive voice on each instrument" and noted that "his tenor style is hard-driving, while the soprano moments, and his remarkably clean flute playing, are atmospheric and free-flying".

The authors of The Penguin Guide to Jazz Recordings awarded the album a full 4 stars, and wrote, "These unaccompanied essays... are magnificently crafted and thoroughly imbued with the creator's personality... this is the most thoroughly individual thing he has done for many years, a magnificent testament to his creative range, his generosity of spirit and his great, great intelligence."

Steve Vickery of Coda commented, "Rivers alternates horns... with piano and voice... never running out of ideas or steam. If anything, the space he defines for himself... underlines the vitality of his work as an improvisor."

The critic Tom Hull remarked, "....first surprise is that he starts off on piano and makes a credible showing; moves on to tenor sax (mostly), soprano sax, flute, and finally back to piano; it's tough to make solo anything work, much less tenor sax, but he's steady and ingenious throughout."

The Chicago Reader's Peter Margasak wrote that the album "brilliantly reveals [Rivers's] wide scope on a variety of instruments", and wrote, "....in a fully improvised setting Rivers shifts seamlessly between rhapsodic ballads, fiery postbop, and intense extended technique."

== Track listing ==
Composed by Sam Rivers.

1. "Image" – 8:36
2. "Silhouette" – 8:48
3. "Reflection" – 6:32
4. "Mirror" – 8:25
5. "Vignette" – 8:19
6. "Shadow" – 8:53
7. "Visage" – 5:45
8. "Profile" – 9:00
9. "Cameo" – 12:14

== Personnel ==
- Sam Rivers – tenor saxophone, soprano saxophone, flute, piano, voice
