= Trilogy (Sam Rivers album) =

Live album by Sam Rivers and the Rivbea Orchestra
- Released: 2011
- Recorded: 2008 and 2009
- Venue: Plaza Theatre, Orlando, Florida
- Studio: Sonic Cauldron Studios, Casselberry, Florida
- Genre: Free jazz
- Label: Mosaic; MS-038
- Producer: Monique Williams

Sam Rivers chronology
Aurora (2005)	Trilogy (2011)	Reunion: Live in New York (2012)

Trilogy is a three-disc box set album by saxophonist Sam Rivers and his Rivbea Orchestra. Discs one and three were recorded live at the Plaza Theatre in Orlando, Florida, on November 12, 2008, and April 8, 2009, respectively, while the second disc was recorded at Sonic Cauldron Studios in Casselberry, Florida, on February 27, 2008. The album, which features 22 original compositions by Rivers, was released in limited quantities in 2011 by Mosaic Records as part of their Mosaic Select series.

Rivers moved from New York City to Orlando, Florida, in 1991, and quickly put together a new version of his Rivbea Orchestra, which allowed him to rehearse and present concerts of his works using local, highly-skilled musicians. Many of the instrumentalists who are featured on Trilogy can also be heard on Aurora, recorded in 1999 and released in 2005 by Rivers's Rivbea Sound Company.

== Reception ==
Francis Davis of The Village Voice included the album in his 2011 year-end picks, and praised the live recordings, writing: "Rivers's strategy of solo after solo by every bandmember... blurs the line between composition and improvisation—or do I mean compulsion and improvisation?—in a way that leaves no room for monotony, or doubt as to whose big band this might be."

The New Republic's David Hajdu featured Trilogy in his "Top Ten Albums of 2011," calling it "dizzying."

Writing for All About Jazz, Tim Niland noted the "power and sustained exuberance" of the music, and stated: "Rivers' large band writing is thoroughly modern and quite frequently explosive with intricate orchestral arrangements making way for powerful instrumental solos... The arrangements are particularly lush, nearly Ellingtonian at times."

In an article for Point of Departure, Ed Hazell described the album as "a major late-career statement" from a musician who "is not merely recycling or refining old ideas, but continuing to explore new ones." He commented: "These vibrant albums are especially joyful and on the live sessions you can sense how well they communicate their exuberance and fellow feeling to the audience. But no one sounds happier than the band's leader, whose hoots of approval and delighted shouts often are heard above the audience's. Rivers has every reason to be pleased."

Marc Medwin of Dusted Magazine called the recording "first-class music that embraces multiple styles, but which also has an irresistible exploratory edge," and remarked: "The vigor Rivers musters during these sessions is amazing... most of the solos in the set are as compact as solos can be. This is necessary, as space is limited, and many of these tunes move very quickly."

== Track listing ==
Composed by Sam Rivers.

Disc 1 - Offering

1. "Spice" – 8:52
2. "Ganymede" – 9:04
3. "Crux" – 8:13
4. "Aura" – 15:48
5. "Perkin" – 9:39
6. "Pulsar" – 14:13
- Recorded live at the Plaza Theatre in Orlando, Florida, on November 12, 2008.

Disc 2 - Progeny

1. "Robyn" – 6:21
2. "Cindy" – 5:46
3. "Monique" – 6:44
4. "Traci" – 5:10
5. "Iisha" – 4:42
6. "Tamara" – 5:20
7. "Tiffany" – 5:40
8. "Jessica" – 7:32
9. "Destiny" – 6:54
- Recorded at Sonic Cauldron Studios in Casselberry, Florida, on February 27, 2008.

Disc 3 - Edge

1. "Ridge" – 10:27
2. "Brink" – 11:04
3. "Precipice" – 9:29
4. "Verge" – 10:32
5. "Point" – 10:12
6. "Visions" – 11:38
7. "Pulsar" – 8:25
- Recorded live at the Plaza Theatre in Orlando, Florida, on April 8, 2009.

== Personnel ==
- Sam Rivers – tenor saxophone, soprano saxophone
- Jeff Rupert – alto saxophone
- Chris Charles – alto saxophone
- David Pate – tenor saxophone (discs 1 and 3)
- Charlie DeChant – tenor saxophone (discs 2 and 3)
- George Weremchuk – tenor saxophone (discs 1 and 2)
- Brian Mackie – baritone saxophone
- Tom Parmenter – trumpet
- Brian Scanlon – trumpet
- Mike Iapichino – trumpet
- David Jones – trumpet
- Keith Oshiro – trombone
- Tito Sanchez – trombone (disc 1)
- David Sheffield – trombone (discs 2 and 3)
- Steve Smith – trombone (discs 1 and 3)
- Claire Courchene – trombone (disc 2)
- Josh Parsons – trombone, tuba
- Doug Mathews – double bass
- Rion Smith – drums
