= A New Conception =

Studio album by Sam Rivers
- Released: November 1967
- Recorded: October 11, 1966
- Studio: Van Gelder, Englewood Cliffs, NJ
- Genre: Jazz
- Length: 43:51
- Label: Blue Note; BST 84249
- Producer: Alfred Lion

Sam Rivers chronology
Contours (1965)	A New Conception (1967)	Streams (1973)

A New Conception is the third album by American saxophonist Sam Rivers, recorded in 1966 and released on the Blue Note label. The album features Rivers' interpretation of seven jazz standards.

== Reception ==
Professional ratings
Review scores
Source	Rating
AllMusic	4/5 stars
DownBeat	3.5/5 stars
The Encyclopedia of Popular Music	4/5 stars

The AllMusic review by Stephen Thomas Erlewine stated, "It's challenging music that remains accessible, since it reconfigures familiar items in new, intriguing ways. The sheer skill in Rivers' arrangements once again confirms his large, unfortunately underappreciated, talent".

== Track listing ==
1. "When I Fall in Love" (Heyman, Young) – 5:48
2. "I'll Never Smile Again" (Lowe) – 5:57
3. "Detour Ahead" (Lou Carter, Ellis, John Freigo) – 5:09
4. "That's All" (Alan Brandt, Haymes) – 5:38
5. "What a Diff'rence a Day Made" (Adams, Grever) – 6:18
6. "Temptation" (Brown, Freed) – 7:38
7. "Secret Love" (Fain, Webster) – 7:33

== Personnel ==
- Sam Rivers – tenor saxophone, soprano saxophone, flute
- Hal Galper – piano
- Herbie Lewis – bass
- Steve Ellington – drums

== Charts ==
=== Monthly charts ===
Monthly chart performance for A New Conception
Chart (2025)	Peak position
German Jazz Albums (Offizielle Top 100)	10
