= Fluid Records =

Fluid Records was a jazz record label which released only 4 albums, although each featured legendary figures of the genre.

== Discography ==
FLU	Artist	Title	Recorded
101	Sam Rivers with Dave Holland and Barry Altschul	Paragon (Discogs)	1977.04.18
102	Archie Shepp and Joe Lee Wilson with Siegfried Kessler, Cameron Brown, and Clifford Jarvis	A Touch of the Blues (Discogs)	1977.10.19
103	Max Roach with Billy Harper, Cecil Bridgewater, and Calvin Hill	Confirmation (Discogs)	1978.07.10
104	Archie Shepp with Herman Wright and Clifford Jarvis	Maple Leaf Rag	1978.07.14
