= Jumpin' In =

Studio album by the Dave Holland Quintet
- Released: 1984
- Recorded: October 1983
- Studio: Tonstudio Bauer; Ludwigsburg, West Germany
- Genre: Jazz
- Length: 48:55
- Label: ECM; ECM 1269
- Producer: Manfred Eicher

Dave Holland chronology
Life Cycle (1982)	Jumpin' In (1984)	Seeds of Time (1985)

Dave Holland Quintet chronology
Jumpin' In (1984)	Seeds of Time (1985)

Jumpin' In is an album by the Dave Holland Quintet recorded in October 1983 and released on ECM the following year on LP and CD. The quintet features trumpeter Kenny Wheeler, alto saxophonist Steve Coleman, trombonist Julian Priester, and drummer Steven Ellington.

The album title has been used for the Manx Radio Friday night show Jumpin' In, presented by the brothers Caine.

== Reception ==
The AllMusic review by Scott Yanow stated: "Bassist Dave Holland leads one of his most stimulating groups on this superlative quintet date... This set, which has plenty of variety in moods, tone, colors, and styles, is one of Holland's better recordings."

Professional ratings
Review scores
Source	Rating
AllMusic	4.5/5 stars
Tom Hull	B
The Penguin Guide to Jazz on CD	3.5/4 stars
The Rolling Stone Jazz Record Guide	4.5/5 stars

== Track listing ==
All tracks are written by Dave Holland except as indicated

No.	Title	Writer(s)	Length
1.	"Jumpin' In"		7:41
2.	"First Snow"		6:28
3.	"The Dragon and the Samurai"	Steve Coleman	8:25
4.	"New-One"		7:37
5.	"Sunrise"		5:26
6.	"Shadow Dance"		5:22
7.	"You I Love"		7:56

== Personnel ==
=== Dave Holland Quintet ===
- Steve Coleman – alto saxophone, flute
- Kenny Wheeler – trumpet, pocket trumpet, cornet, fluegelhorn
- Julian Priester – trombone
- David Holland – acoustic bass, cello
- Steve Ellington – drums
