= Contours (album) =

Studio album by Sam Rivers
- Released: January 1967
- Recorded: May 21, 1965
- Studio: Van Gelder, Englewood Cliffs, NJ
- Genre: Avant-garde jazz
- Length: 40:08
- Label: Blue Note; BST 84206
- Producer: Alfred Lion

Sam Rivers chronology
Fuchsia Swing Song (1964)	Contours (1967)	A New Conception (1967)

Contours is the second album by American saxophonist Sam Rivers, recorded in 1965 and released on the Blue Note label. The CD reissue contains an alternate take as a bonus track.

== Reception ==
Professional ratings
Review scores
Source	Rating
AllMusic	5/5 stars
DownBeat	4.5/5 stars
The Encyclopedia of Popular Music	4/5 stars
The Penguin Guide to Jazz Recordings	3/4 stars
The Rolling Stone Jazz Record Guide	4/5 stars

The Allmusic review by Stephen Thomas Erlewine stated, "On Contours, his second Blue Note album, tenor saxophonist Sam Rivers fully embraced the avant-garde, but presented his music in a way that wouldn't be upsetting or confusing to hard bop loyalists... Rarely is Contours anything less than enthralling, and it remains one of the high watermarks of the mid-'60s avant-garde movement".

== Track listing ==
All compositions by Sam Rivers.

1. "Point of Many Returns" - 9:20
2. "Dance of the Tripedal" - 10:07
3. "Euterpe" - 11:43
4. "Mellifluous Cacophony" - 8:58
5. "Mellifluous Cacophony" [Alternate Take] - 9:04 Bonus track on CD reissue

== Personnel ==
- Sam Rivers - tenor saxophone, soprano saxophone, flute
- Freddie Hubbard - trumpet
- Herbie Hancock - piano
- Ron Carter - bass
- Joe Chambers - drums
