= Life Cycle (Dave Holland album) =

Studio album by David Holland
- Released: 1983
- Recorded: November 1982
- Studio: Tonstudio Bauer; Ludwigsburg, W. Germany
- Genre: Jazz
- Length: 42:28
- Label: ECM; ECM 1238
- Producer: Manfred Eicher

David Holland chronology
Emerald Tears (1978)	Life Cycle (1983)	Jumpin' In (1984)

Life Cycle is a solo cello album by Dave Holland recorded in November 1982 and released on ECM the following year.

== Reception ==
The AllMusic review by Brian Olewnick states: "Life Cycle is a very enchanting solo cello recital and, in Holland's case, a strong picture of a side of his musical genius that even many of his fans may well have overlooked. Recommended."

Professional ratings
Review scores
Source	Rating
AllMusic	3/5 stars
The Penguin Guide to Jazz on CD	3/4 stars
The Rolling Stone Jazz Record Guide	4/5 stars

== Track listing ==
All tracks are written by Dave Holland

Side I
No.	Title	Length
1.	"Inception"	4:17
2.	"Discovery"	4:27
3.	"Longing"	4:25
4.	"Search"	3:24
5.	"Resolution"	4:36
Total length:		21:09

Side II
No.	Title	Length
1.	"Sonnet"	2:22
2.	"Rune"	4:26
3.	"Troubadour Tale"	3:06
4.	"Grapevine"	3:29
5.	"Morning Song"	2:01
6.	"Chanson pour la nuit"	5:55
Total length:		21:19 42:28

== Personnel ==
- David Holland – cello

=== Technical personnel ===
- Manfred Eicher – producer
- Martin Wieland – engineer
- Barbara Wojirsch – design
- Signe Mähler – liner photography
