= Emerald Tears =

Studio album by Dave Holland
- Released: 1978
- Recorded: August 1977
- Studio: Talent Studio; Oslo, Norway
- Genre: Jazz
- Length: 44:35
- Label: ECM 1109 ST
- Producer: Manfred Eicher

David Holland chronology
Gateway (1976)	Emerald Tears (1978)	Life Cycle (1982)

Emerald Tears is a solo album by bassist Dave Holland, recorded in August 1977 and released on ECM the following year. It is an album of bass solos.

== Reception ==
The AllMusic review by Joslyn Layne stated: "Emerald Tears is a very nice showcase of Dave Holland, and is almost certain to be enjoyed by fans of the upright bass."

Larry Birnbaum gave the album 3.5 stars in his DownBeat review. He wrote, "Holland's rich, varnished tone and throbbing percussive sensitivity are compounded with keen intelligence and a brooding streak of romantic melancholy". However, he found, "Alone in the glare of the spotlight, Holland somehow manages to remain in shadow and one is neverquite free of the sensation that this is a Music Minus One album turned inside out".

Professional ratings
Review scores
Source	Rating
AllMusic	4/5 stars
The Penguin Guide to Jazz on CD	3/4 stars
The Rolling Stone Jazz Record Guide	3.5/5 stars
DownBeat	3.5/5 stars

== Track listing ==
All tracks are written by Dave Holland, except as noted.

Side I
No.	Title	Writer(s)	Length
1.	"Spheres"		5:58
2.	"Emerald Tears"		6:31
3.	"Combination"		5:18
4.	"B-40/RS-4-W/M23-6K"	Anthony Braxton	5:15
Total length:			23:02

Side II
No.	Title	Writer(s)	Length
1.	"Under Redwoods"		6:38
2.	"Solar"	Miles Davis	6:17
3.	"Flurries"		4:34
4.	"Hooveling"		4:04
Total length:			21:33 44:35

== Personnel ==
- David Holland – double bass
