= Violet Violets =

Studio album by Sam Rivers, Ben Street, and Kresten Osgood
- Released: 2005
- Recorded: October 14 and 15, 2004
- Studio: Kampo Studios, New York
- Genre: Free jazz
- Length: 43:47
- Label: Stunt Records; STUCD 05112
- Producer: Kresten Osgood

Sam Rivers chronology
Purple Violets (2005)	Violet Violets (2005)	Aurora (2005)

Violet Violets is an album by saxophonist and flutist Sam Rivers, double bassist Ben Street, and drummer Kresten Osgood. It was recorded on October 14 and 15, 2004, at Kampo Studios in New York, and was released in 2005 by Stunt Records, a Danish label.

The album Purple Violets (Stunt, 2005) was recorded at the same session, with the same personnel plus vibraphonist Bryan Carrott.

== Reception ==
Professional ratings
Review scores
Source	Rating
All About Jazz	4/5 stars
All About Jazz	3.5/5 stars
AllMusic	4.5/5 stars
The Penguin Guide to Jazz	3/4 stars
Tom Hull – on the Web	B+

In a review for AllMusic, Ken Dryden wrote: "the trio explores its adventurous music, an aggressive form of post-bop intertwined with avant-garde twists at times. The octogenarian Rivers is still a potent force... The musicians obviously enjoyed their studio collaboration, so future projects will be of considerable interest."

Annika Westman of All About Jazz stated that Rivers' "remarkable tone is in a class of its own, just like the deep musical content of his playing. The fact that he has spent a lifetime developing it is not the only reason he sounds this great. Not everyone performs on such a high level at the age of 82, but in Sam Rivers' case, there has definitely been no decline with age... truly the opposite."

The Sydney Morning Herald's John Shand commented: "Sam Rivers is now 82. Think about that for a moment while I tell you how energetically he plays and how sumptuous he sounds here. The band is a trio... a spacious setting in which to hear all the nuances of the veteran's artistry."

== Track listing ==
1. "Nature Calls Part 1" (Sam Rivers) – 3:16
2. "Horatio {One for Herbie Nichols}" (Kresten Osgood) – 5:02
3. "Invisible" (Ornette Coleman) – 4:09
4. "Fast Response" (Kresten Osgood, Sam Rivers) – 2:08
5. "I Forgot to Remember" (Lucky Thompson) – 5:35
6. "No Time Toulouse" (Ben Street, Kresten Osgood, Sam Rivers) – 4:10
7. "What a Difference a Day Made" (Stanley Adams) – 5:14
8. "Lace" (Ben Street, Kresten Osgood, Sam Rivers) – 4:07
9. "Chianti Blues" (Sam Rivers) – 3:27
10. "Nature Calls Part 2" (Sam Rivers) – 6:51

== Personnel ==
- Sam Rivers – tenor saxophone, flute
- Ben Street – double bass
- Kresten Osgood – drums
