= Seeds of Time =

Studio album by the Dave Holland Quintet
- Released: 1985
- Recorded: November 1984
- Studio: Tonstudio Bauer; Ludwigsburg, West Germany
- Genre: Jazz
- Length: 52:08
- Label: ECM 1292
- Producer: Manfred Eicher

Dave Holland chronology
Jumpin' In (1984)	Seeds of Time (1985)	The Razor's Edge (1987)

Dave Holland Quintet chronology
Jumpin' In (1984)	Seeds of Time (1985)	The Razor's Edge (1987)

Seeds of Time is a studio album by the Dave Holland Quintet recorded in November 1984 and released on ECM the following year on LP and CD. The quintet features brass section Kenny Wheeler, Steve Coleman, and Julian Priester from Holland's previous release, along with new drummer Marvin “Smitty” Smith.

== Reception ==
The AllMusic review by Scott Yanow stated: "The all-star musicians pack plenty of music and concise solos into each performance (nine originals), and the unique group carved out its own niche, not quite free but certainly unpredictable."

Tyran Grillo of Between Sound and Space wrote "Seeds of Time presents the Dave Holland Quintet in arguably its finest incarnation... The energy of this music is such that we find ourselves lost in every contortion of its features. Holland is no holds barred without being aggressive, direct without being confrontational, straightforward without ever being staid. Each successive album only seems to further energize his band mates, and with Seeds of Time we know firsthand how he can do the same for his listeners. A must-hear for those who take their coffee with excitement."

Professional ratings
Review scores
Source	Rating
AllMusic	4/5 stars
Jazzwise	4/5 stars
The Penguin Guide to Jazz on CD	3/4 stars
The Rolling Stone Jazz & Blues Album Guide	3.5/5 stars

== Track listing ==
No.	Title	Writer(s)	Length
1.	"Uhren"	Steve Coleman	4:53
2.	"Homecoming"	Dave Holland	6:01
3.	"Perspicuity"	Doug Hammond	3:42
4.	"Celebration"	Julian Priester	5:11
5.	"World Protection Blues"	Hammond	7:00
6.	"Gridlock (Opus 8)"	Coleman	8:24
7.	"Walk-a-way"	Holland; Marvin Smith	3:55
8.	"The Good Doctor"	Kenny Wheeler	5:54
9.	"Double Vision"	Holland	7:08

== Personnel ==
=== Dave Holland Quintet ===
- Kenny Wheeler – trumpet, pocket trumpet, cornet, fluegelhorn
- Steve Coleman – alto saxophone, soprano saxophone, flute
- Julian Priester – trombone
- David Holland – bass
- Marvin "Smitty" Smith – drums, percussion
