= Purple Violets (album) =

Studio album by Sam Rivers, Ben Street, Kresten Osgood, and Bryan Carrott
- Released: 2005
- Recorded: October 14 and 15, 2004
- Studio: Kampo Studios, New York
- Genre: Free jazz
- Length: 49:59
- Label: Stunt Records; STUCD 04162
- Producer: Kresten Osgood

Sam Rivers chronology
Vista (2004)	Purple Violets (2005)	Violet Violets (2005)

Purple Violets is an album by saxophonist and flutist Sam Rivers, double bassist Ben Street, drummer Kresten Osgood, and vibraphonist Bryan Carrott. It was recorded on October 14 and 15, 2004, at Kampo Studios in New York, and was released in 2005 by Stunt Records, a Danish label.

The album Violet Violets (Stunt, 2005) was recorded at the same session, with the same personnel minus Carrott.

== Reception ==
Professional ratings
Review scores
Source	Rating
AllMusic	4/5 stars
The Penguin Guide to Jazz	2.5/4 stars
Tom Hull – on the Web	B+

In a review for AllMusic, Ken Dryden called the album "remarkable" and "highly recommended," and noted Rivers's "still-potent tenor sax."

Rex Butters of All About Jazz wrote: "Rivers runs in good company—his gorgeous, evocative tone intact on tenor, soprano, and flute. His unique musical vision still mysterious and accessible, and his technical skill remains riveting... Purple Violets shows Rivers still at the top of one of the greatest games in jazz. Long may he rave."

The authors of The Penguin Guide to Jazz Recordings stated that the members of the rhythm section "provide a very solid foundation for the maestro," but commented: "Sam's chops are not in good shape and he seems to run out of breath, if not ideas, on just about every cut."

== Track listing ==
1. "Solace" (Sam Rivers) – 6:42
2. "The Mooche" (Duke Ellington) – 7:30
3. "Captain America" (Ben Street, Kresten Osgood, Sam Rivers) – 5:51
4. "Abalone" (Kresten Osgood) – 6:51
5. "In Search of Black Benny" (Kresten Osgood) – 3:29
6. "Turbulence" (Kresten Osgood, Sam Rivers) – 3:34
7. "Where to Go" (Kresten Osgood) – 6:13
8. "Moderation" (Ben Street, Kresten Osgood, Sam Rivers) – 5:42
9. "Space" (Bryan Carrott, Sam Rivers) – 4:06

== Personnel ==
- Sam Rivers – tenor saxophone, soprano saxophone, flute
- Bryan Carrott – vibraphone
- Ben Street – double bass
- Kresten Osgood – drums
