= Vista (Sam Rivers, Adam Rudolph, and Harris Eisenstadt album) =

Studio album by Sam Rivers, Adam Rudolph, and Harris Eisenstadt
- Released: 2004
- Recorded: September 24, 2003
- Studio: Clear Lake Recording, Venice, California
- Genre: Free jazz
- Length: 52:44
- Label: Meta Records; 009
- Producer: Adam Rudolph, Harris Eisenstadt

Sam Rivers chronology
Celebration (2004)	Vista (2004)	Purple Violets (2005)

Vista is an album by saxophonist and flutist Sam Rivers and percussionists Adam Rudolph and Harris Eisenstadt. It was recorded on September 24, 2003, at Clear Lake Recording in Venice, California, and was released in 2004 by Red Records.

Regarding his encounter with Rivers, Eisenstadt stated: "he blew us away, man... he was blowing circles around us. He's 80, and the guy had the kind of energy that I can only hope to have at that age."

== Reception ==
Professional ratings
Review scores
Source	Rating
AllMusic	3.5/5 stars
The Penguin Guide to Jazz	3/4 stars
Tom Hull – on the Web	B+

In a review for AllMusic, Thom Jurek wrote: "While completely in the moment, utterly outside, and spontaneously realized, there is a certain warmth and accessibility on this outing that is unexpected. The music flows, easily, effortlessly... This is not a date for everyone and it is a workout, but it's a sublime one that offers plenty to anyone willing to take it on its own terms."

The authors of The Penguin Guide to Jazz Recordings noted the "highly concentrated playing from Rivers," but stated that the album is "not one of his more essential recordings."

A reviewer for JazzTimes commented: "Make no mistake. This is hardcore, high-energy improv — and it's typical Rivers. He's not going to talk down to you, but if you're willing to meet him more than halfway, you're going to learn a thing or two about the power of free music."

Dusted Magazine's Derek Taylor praised the musicians' "communal approach toward song-crafting" and the "joint value placed on open-ended, cliché free improvisation," and remarked: "Recommending this one to both Rivers aficionados and newcomers alike is a cinch."

Ken Waxman of JazzWord wrote: "More proof that improvised music is the least ageist — as well as racist and sexist — sound around, Vista will be welcomed by anyone eager to catch up with Rivers and appreciate the skills of his associates."

Writing for Downtown Music Gallery, Bruce Lee Gallanter stated: "Vista shows that Sam Rivers remains undaunted, filled with energy and ideas, an incredible match for any of his collaborators... Sam plays a different instrument on each piece and both percussionists have that ancient-to-modern vibe which keeps Mr. Rivers on his toes, balancing perfectly between worlds."

== Track listing ==
1. "Susurration" – 5:50
2. "Capacious" – 6:28
3. "Motivity" – 8:28
4. "Philio" – 8:26
5. "Plumaseria" – 9:28
6. "Specular" – 5:38
7. "Vista" – 8:26

== Personnel ==
- Sam Rivers – flute, soprano saxophone, tenor saxophone
- Adam Rudolph – hand drums, percussion
- Harris Eisenstadt – drums
