= Waves (Sam Rivers album) =

Studio album by Sam Rivers
- Released: 1978
- Recorded: August 8, 1978
- Genre: Jazz
- Length: 44:04
- Label: Tomato

Sam Rivers chronology
Rendez-vous (1977)	Waves (1978)	Contrasts (1979)

Waves is an album by American jazz saxophonist Sam Rivers, recorded in 1978 and released on the Tomato label.

== Reception ==
Professional ratings
Review scores
Source	Rating
AllMusic	4/5 stars
The Penguin Guide to Jazz	4/4 stars
The Rolling Stone Jazz Record Guide	5/5 stars
DownBeat	4.5/5 stars

The AllMusic review by Ron Wynn stated: "An explosive late '70s set with underrated composer, multi-instrumentalist, and arranger Sam Rivers leading a strong quartet... Their array of contrasting voicings, with Rivers on tenor and soprano sax and flute, makes for compelling listening".

The authors of The Penguin Guide to Jazz called the album "a neglected masterpiece from one of the most interesting of Rivers's small groups," and wrote: "It's a shame this fine record hasn't had wider currency."

DownBeat assigned 4.5 stars. Reviewer Michael Zipkin wrote, "There is lucidity here, and in just about every moment of Wav«: sometimes indefinable, always seductive, open hearted and very approachable".

== Track listing ==
All compositions by Sam Rivers

1. "Shockwave" - 14:58
2. "Torch" - 7:05
3. "Pulse" - 10:33
4. "Flux" - 6:10
5. "Surge" - 5:18

- Recorded at Big Apple Studio in New York City on August 8, 1978

== Personnel ==
- Sam Rivers - tenor saxophone, soprano saxophone, flute, piano
- Dave Holland - bass, cello
- Joe Daley - tuba, baritone horn
- Thurman Barker - drums, percussion
