= Dave Holland (bassist) =

British jazz musician (born 1946)

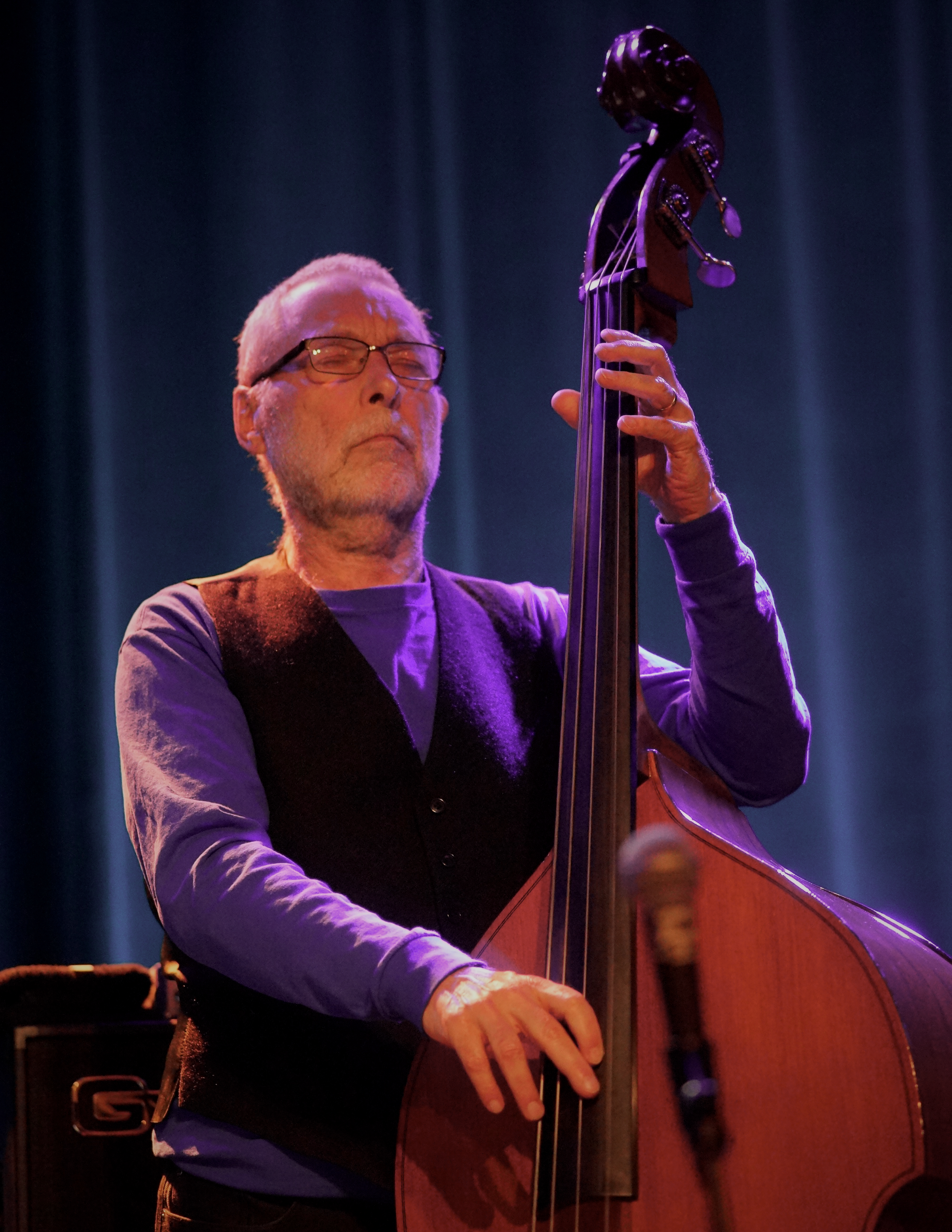
- Holland in 2018

Background information
- Born: 1 October 1946 (age 79); Wolverhampton, Staffordshire, England
- Genres: Jazz; avant-garde; jazz fusion
- Occupations: Musician; composer
- Instruments: Double bass; bass guitar; cello
- Years active: 1964–present
- Labels: ECM; Dare2
- Formerly of: Circle; Gateway
- Website: www.daveholland.com

David Holland (born 1 October 1946) is an English double bassist, bass guitarist, cellist, composer and bandleader who has been performing and recording for five decades. He has lived in the United States since the early 1970s.

His extensive discography ranges from solo performances to pieces for big band. Holland runs his own independent record label, Dare2, which he launched in 2005.

== Biography ==
Born in Wolverhampton, England, Holland taught himself how to play stringed instruments, beginning at four on the ukulele, then graduating to guitar and later bass guitar. He quit school at the age of 15 to pursue his profession in a pop band, but soon gravitated to jazz. After seeing an issue of Down Beat where Ray Brown had won the critics' poll for best bass player, Holland went to a record store, and bought a couple of LPs featuring Brown backing pianist Oscar Peterson. He also bought two Leroy Vinnegar albums (Leroy Walks! and Leroy Walks Again!!) because the bassist was posed with his instrument on the cover. Within a week, Holland traded in his bass guitar for a double bass and began practicing with the records. In addition to Brown and Vinnegar, Holland was drawn to the bassists Charles Mingus and Jimmy Garrison.

After moving to London in 1964, Holland played double bass in small venues and studied with James Edward Merrett, principal bassist of the Philharmonia Orchestra and, later, the BBC Symphony Orchestra. Merrett trained him to sight read and then recommended he apply to the Guildhall School of Music and Drama. Holland received a full-time scholarship for the three-year programme. At 20, Holland was keeping a busy schedule in school, studios and Ronnie Scott's Jazz Club, London's premier jazz club, where he often played in bands that supported such touring American jazz saxophonists as Coleman Hawkins, Ben Webster and Joe Henderson. He also linked up with other British jazz musicians, including guitarist John McLaughlin, saxophonists Evan Parker and John Surman, South Africa-born London-based pianist Chris McGregor, and drummer John Stevens, and performed on the Spontaneous Music Ensemble's 1968 album Karyobin. He also began a working relationship with Canada-born, England-based trumpeter Kenny Wheeler that continued until Wheeler's death in 2014.

=== With Miles Davis ===
In 1968, Miles Davis and Philly Joe Jones heard him at Ronnie Scott's Jazz Club, playing in a combo that opened for the Bill Evans Trio. Jones told Holland that Davis wanted him to join his band (replacing Ron Carter). Davis left the UK before Holland could contact him directly, and two weeks later Holland was given three days' notice to fly to New York for an engagement at Count Basie's nightclub. He arrived the night before, staying with Jack DeJohnette, a previous acquaintance. The following day Herbie Hancock took him to the club, and his two years with Davis began. This was also Hancock's last gig as Davis's pianist, as he left afterwards for a honeymoon in Brazil and was replaced by Chick Corea when he could not return for an engagement due to illness. Holland's first recordings with Davis were in September 1968, and he appears on half of the album Filles de Kilimanjaro (with Davis, Corea, Wayne Shorter and Tony Williams).

Holland was a member of Davis's rhythm section through the summer of 1970; he appears on the albums In a Silent Way and Bitches' Brew. In the first year of his tenure with Davis, Holland played primarily upright bass. By the end of 1969, he played electric bass guitar (often treated with wah-wah pedal and other electronic effects) with greater frequency as Davis moved away from acoustic jazz.

Holland was also a member of Davis's working group during this time, unlike many of the musicians who appeared only on the trumpeter's studio recordings. The so-called "lost quintet" of Davis, Shorter, Corea, Holland and DeJohnette was active in 1969 but never made any studio recordings as a quintet. A 1970 live recording of this group plus percussionist Airto Moreira, Live at the Fillmore East, March 7, 1970: It's About That Time, was issued in 2001. Steve Grossman replaced Shorter in early 1970; Keith Jarrett joined the group as a second keyboardist thereafter, and Gary Bartz replaced Grossman during the summer of 1970. By the end of the summer, rhythm and blues bass guitarist Michael Henderson had replaced Holland.

=== ECM and the 1970s ===
After leaving Davis's group, Holland briefly joined the avant-garde jazz group Circle, with Corea, saxophonist Anthony Braxton and percussionist Barry Altschul. This started a decades-long association with the ECM record label. After recording a few albums, Circle disbanded when Corea departed. 1972 saw the recording of Conference of the Birds, with Braxton, saxophonist/flautist Sam Rivers and Altschul– Holland's first recording as a leader, and the beginning of a long musical relationship with Rivers. The title of the album is taken from that of a 4,500-line epic poem by Persian Sufist writer, Farid al-Din Attar.

Holland worked as a leader and as a sideman with many other jazz artists in the 1970s. On 15 June 1972 he played with Thelonious Monk at the Village Vanguard which was one of Monk's last concerts. Holland recorded several important albums with Anthony Braxton between 1972 and 1976 – including New York, Fall 1974 (1974) and Five Pieces (1975) – that were released on Arista Records. Holland also recorded duo sessions with saxophonist Sam Rivers and fellow bassist Barre Phillips, and the solo bass album Emerald Tears. Also in the 1970s he appeared with performers including Stan Getz and the Gateway Trio with John Abercrombie and DeJohnette. The Gateway trio released two influential modern jazz albums in 1975 and 1977, and reformed in 1994 for a recording session which yielded another two albums. As a sideman, Holland appeared on rock and pop recordings as well, working with singer Bonnie Raitt on her 1972 album Give It Up.

=== The 1980s ===
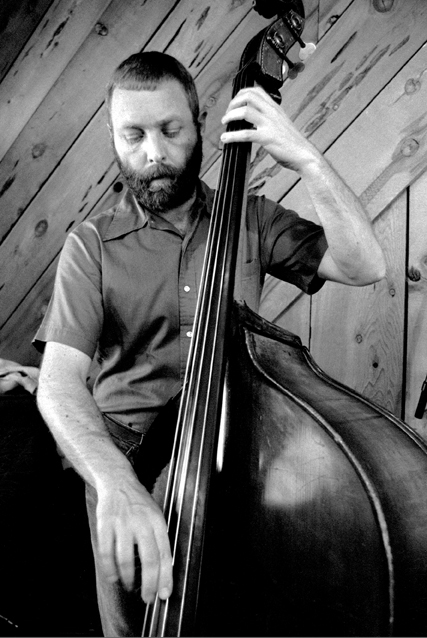
Holland c. March 1987

Holland formed his first working quintet in 1983, and over the next four years released Jumpin' In, Seeds of Time, and The Razor's Edge, featuring alto saxophonist Steve Coleman, trumpeter Wheeler and trombonist Julian Priester (or Robin Eubanks). Subsequently, he formed the Dave Holland Trio (with Coleman and DeJohnette) for the 1988 album Triplicate, and teamed with Coleman, electric guitarist Kevin Eubanks and drummer Marvin "Smitty" Smith for Extensions. He also recorded Life Cycle, an album of compositions played on solo cello.

The bassist also continued to collaborate with his peers, often connecting with figures from the previous generation of jazz icons. In 1989, Holland teamed with drummer Billy Higgins and pianist Hank Jones to record The Oracle, and joined drummer Roy Haynes and guitarist Pat Metheny in 1989 to record Question and Answer.

=== The 1990s and 2000s ===
During the 1990s, Holland renewed an affiliation, begun in the 1970s, with Joe Henderson, joining the tenor saxophonist on So Near (So Far), a tribute to Miles Davis, and Porgy & Bess. Holland also reunited with vocalist Betty Carter, touring and recording the live album Feed the Fire (1993). Fellow Davis alumnus Herbie Hancock invited Holland to tour with him in 1992, subsequently recording The New Standard. Holland joined Hancock's band again in 1996. He was also part of the sessions for River: The Joni Letters, winner of the 2008 Grammy Award for Album of the Year.

As a leader, Holland formed his third quartet and released Dream of the Elders (1995), which introduced the vibraphonist Steve Nelson to his ensembles. Holland formed a quintet that includes tenor saxophonist Chris Potter, trombonist Robin Eubanks and, a more recent addition, drummer Nate Smith. Their recordings include Points of View, Prime Directive, Not for Nothin, Extended Play: Live at Birdland and Critical Mass. In addition to releasing four quintet albums on ECM, Holland debuted his Big Band, which released What Goes Around in 2002. The album won Holland his first Grammy as a leader, in the Best Large Jazz Ensemble Album category. The second Big Band recording, Overtime (2005), again won the Grammy in the Best Large Jazz Ensemble Album category; it was released on Holland's Dare2 label, which he formed that year.

In 2009, Holland was a co-founder of an all-star group called the Overtone Quartet. The group consisted of Holland on bass, Chris Potter on tenor saxophone, Jason Moran on piano, and Eric Harland on drums. The group toured extensively throughout the United States and Europe.

== Awards and honors ==
He won the Critics Poll in Down Beat magazine for Musician of the Year, Big Band of the Year, and Acoustic Bassist of the Year (he also garnered top bassist in the 2006 poll). The Jazz Journalists' Association honored him as Musician and Acoustic Bassist of the Year. He was the recipient of the Miles Davis Award at the Montreal Jazz Festival.

The National Endowment for the Arts named Holland as one of its five Jazz Masters Fellows in 2017; the award recognizes artists for their lifetime achievements and exceptional contributions toward the advancement of jazz.

Holland has received honorary doctorates from the New England Conservatory, Boston, where he held a full-time teaching position in 1987–88 and where he has been visiting artist in residence since 2005; Berklee College of Music, Boston; and the Birmingham Conservatoire, in England. He was also named Fellow of the Guildhall School of Music and Drama (London). From 1982 to 1989, Holland served as the artistic director of the Banff Summer Jazz Workshop through the Banff School of Fine Arts in Alberta, Canada. In addition, he has taught workshops and master classes around the world at universities and music schools and is President of the UK-based National Youth Jazz Collective.

== Discography ==
=== Albums ===
| Year | Credited artist | Title | Label | Notes |
|---|---|---|---|---|
| 1973 | Dave Holland Quartet | Conference of the Birds | ECM | |
| 1978 | Dave Holland | Emerald Tears | ECM | solo bass |
| 1983 | Dave Holland | Life Cycle | ECM | solo cello |
| 1984 | Dave Holland Quintet | Jumpin' In | ECM | |
| 1985 | Dave Holland Quintet | Seeds of Time | ECM | |
| 1987 | Dave Holland Quintet | The Razor's Edge | ECM | |
| 1988 | Dave Holland Trio | Triplicate | ECM | |
| 1990 | Dave Holland Quartet | Extensions | ECM | |
| 1995 | Dave Holland | Ones All | VeraBra | solo bass |
| 1996 | Dave Holland Quartet | Dream of the Elders | ECM | |
| 1998 | Dave Holland Quintet | Points of View | ECM | |
| 1999 | Dave Holland Quintet | Prime Directive | ECM | |
| 2001 | Dave Holland Quintet | Not for Nothin' | ECM | |
| 2002 | Dave Holland Big Band | What Goes Around | ECM | |
| 2003 | Dave Holland Quintet | Extended Play: Live at Birdland | ECM | [2CD] live in concert |
| 2005 | Dave Holland Big Band | Overtime | Dare2 | |
| 2006 | Dave Holland Quintet | Critical Mass | Dare2 | |
| 2008 | Dave Holland Sextet | Pass It On | Dare2 | |
| 2010 | Dave Holland Octet | Pathways | Dare2 | live in concert at Birdland, N.Y. |
| 2013 | Dave Holland Quartet | Prism | Dare2 | |
| 2016 | Dave Holland Quartet | Aziza | Dare2 | |
| 2018 | Dave Holland | Uncharted Territories | Dare2 | [2CD] with Evan Parker, Craig Taborn, Ches Smith |
| 2021 | Dave Holland | Another Land | Edition | trio |

=== Compilation(s) ===
| Year | Credited artist | Title | Label | Notes |
|---|---|---|---|---|
| 2004 | Dave Holland | Rarum, Vol. 10: Selected Recordings | ECM | 2xCD |

=== Albums with shared credits ===
Dates in brackets are the date of release in cases when they took place more than a year after the recording. Credited artists are listed as written on the album cover respectively its credits, but omitting Dave Holland (hence the 'with').

| Year | Format | Credited artists or band | Title | Label | Notes |
|---|---|---|---|---|---|
| 1970 [1975] | Quartet | as Circle with Chick Corea, Anthony Braxton, Barry Altschul | Circling In | Blue Note | |
| 1970 [1978] | Quartet | as Circle with Chick Corea, Anthony Braxton, Barry Altschul | Circulus | Blue Note | |
| 1970 | Quartet | as Circle with Chick Corea, Anthony Braxton, Barry Altschul | Circle 1: Live in Germany Concert | CBS/Sony Japan | |
| 1971 | Quartet | as Circle with Chick Corea, Anthony Braxton, Barry Altschul | Paris Concert | ECM | |
| 1971 | Quartet | as Circle with Chick Corea, Anthony Braxton, Barry Altschul | Circle 2: Gathering | CBS/Sony Japan | |
| 1971 | Quartet | with John McLaughlin, John Surman, Stu Martin, Karl Berger | Where Fortune Smiles | Dawn | |
| 1971 | Trio | with Chick Corea, Barry Altschul | A.R.C. | ECM | |
| 1971 | Duo | with Barre Phillips | Music from Two Basses | ECM | |
| 1971 | Duo | with Derek Bailey | Improvisations for Cello and Guitar | ECM | live in concert |
| 1975 | Septet | with Norman Blake, Tut Taylor, Sam Bush, Butch Robins, Vassar Clements, Jethro Burns | Norman Blake/Tut Taylor/Sam Bush/Butch Robins/Vassar Clements/David Holland/Jethro Burns | HDS | |
| 1975 | Trio | with John Abercrombie and Jack DeJohnette (Gateway) | Gateway | ECM | |
| 1976 | Duo | with Sam Rivers | Dave Holland / Sam Rivers | Improvising Artists | |
| 1976 | Duo | with Sam Rivers | Sam Rivers / Dave Holland Vol. 2 | Improvising Artists | |
| 1976 | Duo | with Karl Berger | All Kinds of Time | Sackville | |
| 1976 and 1986 [1989] | Quartet | with Evan Parker, Paul Rutherford and Paul Lovens | The Ericle of Dolphi | Po Torch | |
| 1977 | Trio | with John Abercrombie and Jack DeJohnette as Gateway | Gateway 2 | ECM | |
| 1985 | Trio | with Vassar Clements, John Hartford | Vassar Clements, John Hartford, Dave Holland | Rounder | |
| 1988 | Trio | with Mark Isaacs, Roy Haynes | Encounters | ABC | |
| 1990 | Trio | with Hank Jones, Billy Higgins | The Oracle | EmArcy | |
| 1991 | Duo | with Steve Coleman | Phase Space | DIW | |
| 1994 | Trio | with John Abercrombie, Jack DeJohnette as Gateway | Homecoming | ECM | |
| 1994 [1996] | Trio | with John Abercrombie, Jack DeJohnette as Gateway | In the Moment | ECM | |
| 1995 | Trio | with Mino Cinelu, Kevin Eubanks | World Trio | Intuition | |
| 2003 | Quartet | with John Scofield, Joe Lovano, Al Foster as ScoLoHoFo | Oh! | Blue Note | |
| 2009 | Quartet | with Gonzalo Rubalcaba, Chris Potter, Eric Harland | The Monterey Quartet: Live at the 2007 Monterey Festival | Monterey Jazz Festival | live in concert |
| 2010 | Duo | with Pepe Habichuela | Hands | Dare2 | |
| 2012 | Trio | with Sam Rivers, Barry Altschul | Reunion: Live in New York | Pi | live in concert |
| 2014 | Duo | with Kenny Barron | The Art of Conversation | Impulse! | |
| 2019 | Trio | with Zakir Hussain, Chris Potter as Crosscurrents Trio | Good Hope | Edition | |
| 2020 | Trio | with Kenny Barron, Johnathan Blake as Kenny Barron/Dave Holland Trio | Without Deception | Dare2 | |
| 2024 | Duo | with Lionel Loueke | United | Edition | |
| 2024 | Duo | with John Scofield | Memories of Home | ECM | |

=== As sideman ===
With Barry Altschul

- You Can't Name Your Own Tune (Muse, 1977)
- Another Time/Another Place (Muse, 1978)

With Karl Berger

- Tune In (Milestone, 1969)
- Transit (Black Saint, 1986)
- Crystal Fire (Enja, 1992)
- Conversations (In+Out, 1994)

With Anouar Brahem

- Thimar (ECM, 1998), rec. 1997
- Blue Maqams (ECM, 2017)
- After the Last Sky (ECM, 2025)

With Anthony Braxton

- The Complete Braxton (Freedom, 1973), rec. 1971
- News from the 70s (Musica Jazz/Felmay, 1998), rec. 1971–1976
- Town Hall 1972 (Trio, 1972)
- Quartet: Live at Moers Festival (Ring, 1976), rec. 1974
- Quartet (Avignon) 1974 (Braxton Bootleg, 2011)
- New York, Fall 1974 (Arista, 1974)
- Trio and Duet (Sackville, 1974)
- Five Pieces 1975 (Arista, 1975)
- The Montreux/Berlin Concerts (Arista, 1977), rec. 1975–76
- Quartet (Bremen) 1975 (Braxton Bootleg, 2011)
- Quintet (New York) 1975 (Braxton Bootleg, 2012)
- Creative Orchestra Music 1976 (Arista, 1976)
- Dortmund (Quartet) 1976 (hatART, 1991)
- Quartet (Graz) 1976 (Braxton Bootleg, 2011)
- Quartet (Berlin) 1976 (Braxton Bootleg, 2013)

With Steve Coleman

- Rhythm People (The Resurrection of Creative Black Civilization) (Novus/RCA, 1990)
- Black Science (Novus/RCA, 1991)
- Rhythm in Mind (Novus/RCA, 1991)

With Chick Corea

- 1969: Is (Groove Merchant, 1969)
- 1969: Sundance (Groove Merchant, 1972)
- 1970: The Song of Singing (Blue Note, 1971)

With Miles Davis

- Filles de Kilimanjaro (Columbia, 1968)
- In a Silent Way (Columbia, 1969)
- Bitches Brew (Columbia, 1969)
- Miles Davis at Newport 1955-1975: The Bootleg Series Vol. 4 (Columbia/Legacy, 2015), rec. with Holland from Jul 1969
- 1969 Miles – Festiva De Juan Pins (Columbia, 1993), rec. Jul 1969
- Live in Europe 1969: The Bootleg Series Vol. 2 (Columbia/Legacy, 2013), rec. Jul and Nov 1969
- Big Fun (Columbia, 1974), rec. with Holland from Nov 1969–Mar 1970
- Live-Evil (Columbia, 1971), rec. with Holland from Feb, Jun 1970
- Black Beauty: Live at the Fillmore West (Columbia, 1973), rec. Apr 1970
- Miles at the Fillmore - Miles Davis 1970: The Bootleg Series Vol. 3 (Columbia/Legacy, 2014), rec. Apr, Jul 1970
- Live at the Fillmore East, March 7, 1970: It's About That Time (Columbia, 2001), rec. Mar 1970
- Miles Davis at Fillmore: Live at the Fillmore East (Columbia, 1970), rec Jun 1970

With Robin Eubanks

- Karma (JMT, 1991)
- Mental Images (JMT, 1994)

With Herbie Hancock

- The New Standard (Verve, 1996)
- River: The Joni Letters (Verve, 2006)

With Billy Hart

- Enchance (Horizon, 1977)
- Oshumare (Gramavision, 1985)

With Joe Henderson

- Black Is the Color (Milestone, 1972)
- Multiple (Milestone, 1973)
- So Near, So Far (Verve, 1993)
- Porgy & Bess (Verve, 1997)

With Eric Kloss

- To Hear Is to See! (Prestige, 1969)
- Consciousness! (Prestige, 1970)
- One, Two, Free (Muse, 1972)

With Dave Liebman

- First Visit (Philips, 1973)
- Fire (Jazzline, 2018) – rec. 2016

With Joe Lovano

- From the Soul (Blue Note, 1992)
- Trio Fascination: Edition One (Blue Note, 1997)

With Sam Rivers

- Sizzle (Impulse!, 1975)
- The Quest (Red, 1976)
- Paragon (Fluid, 1977)
- Waves (Tomato, 1978)
- Contrasts (ECM, 1981)
- Zenith (NoBusiness, 2019)
- Ricochet (NoBusiness, 2020)
- Braids (NoBusiness, 2020)

With Kenny Wheeler

- Windmill Tilter (Fontana, 1969)
- Gnu High (ECM, 1975)
- Deer Wan (ECM, 1977)
- Double, Double You (ECM, 1984)
- Flutter By, Butterfly (Soul Note, 1988)
- Music for Large & Small Ensembles (ECM, 1990)
- The Widow in the Window (ECM, 1990)
- Angel Song (ECM, 1997)
- What Now? (CAM Jazz, 2005)

With others

- Claudia Acuña, Rhythm of Life (Verve, 2002)
- George Adams, Sound Suggestions (ECM, 1979)
- Geri Allen, The Life of a Song (Telarc, 2004)
- Franco Ambrosetti, Tentets (Enja, 1985)
- Kenny Barron, Scratch (Enja, 1985)
- Terence Blanchard, Wandering Moon (Sony Classical, 2000)
- Paul Bley, Paul Bley & Scorpio (Milestone, 1973)
- Michael Brecker, Tales from the Hudson (Impulse!, 1996)
- Nick Brignola, Baritone Madness (Bee Hive, 1978)
- Gary Burton, Like Minds (Concord, 1998)
- Uri Caine, Toys (JMT, 1996)
- Baikida Carroll, Shadows and Reflections (Soul Note, 1982)
- Betty Carter, Feed the Fire (Verve, 1994)
- James Carter, The Real Quiet Storm (Atlantic, 1995)
- Vassar Clements, Once in a While (Flying Fish, 1992)
- Joe Farrell, Joe Farrell Quartet (CTI, 1970)
- Bill Frisell, With Dave Holland and Elvin Jones (Nonesuch, 2001)
- Hal Galper, Inner Journey (Mainstream, 1973)
- Laszlo Gardony, The Legend of Tsumi (Antilles, 1989)
- Barry Guy and the London Jazz Composers' Orchestra, Zurich Concerts (Intakt, 1988)
- Jim Hall, Jim Hall & Basses (Telarc, 2001)
- Roland Hanna, Child of Gemini (MPS, 1971)
- John Hartford, Morning Bugle (Warner Bros. 1972)
- Roy Haynes, Birds of a Feather: A Tribute to Charlie Parker (Dreyfus Jazz, 2001) – Grammy nominated
- Julius Hemphill, The Boyé Multi-National Crusade for Harmony (New World, 2021)
- Leroy Jenkins, For Players Only (JCOA, 1975)
- Lee Konitz, Satori (Milestone, 1974)
- Charles Lloyd, Voice in the Night (ECM, 1998)
- Pat Metheny, Question and Answer (Geffen, 1990)
- Peter O'Mara, Avenue U (Enja, 1990)
- Chris Potter, Unspoken (Concord, 1997)
- Wayne Shorter, Moto Grosso Feio (Blue Note, 1970)
- Tomasz Stańko, Balladyna (ECM, 1976)
- Richard Teitelbaum, Muun Music Universe, Vol. 1: The Peace Church Concerts (CMC/India Navigation, 1974)
- Gary Thomas, While the Gate Is Open (JMT, 1990)
- Collin Walcott, Cloud Dance (ECM, 1975)

== Filmography ==
=== Concert films ===
- 1992 Renaud Le Van Kim: Miles Davis and Friends (Bravo)
- 2000 DeJohnette, Hancock, Holland and Metheny Live in Concert
- 2005 Dave Holland Quintet Live in Freiburg
- 2008 Herbie Hancock & The New Standard Allstars in Japan (Jazz Door)
- 2009 Dave Holland Quintet: Vortex
- 2009 Dave Holland Quintet Live from the Zelt-Musik-Festival, Freiburg 1986

=== Featured in documentaries ===
- 2001 Mike Dibb: The Miles Davis Story (Channel 4)
- 2004 Murray Lerner: Miles Electric: A Different Kind of Blue (Eagle Rock) about the Isle of Wight Festival 1970
