= Streams (Sam Rivers album) =

Live album by Sam Rivers
- Released: 1973
- Recorded: July 6, 1973
- Genre: Jazz
- Length: 49:44
- Label: Impulse!
- Producer: Ed Michel

Sam Rivers chronology
A New Conception (1967)	Streams (1973)	Hues (1971-73)

Streams is a live album by American jazz saxophonist Sam Rivers featuring performances recorded at the Montreux Jazz Festival in 1973 for the Impulse! label.

== Reception ==
Professional ratings
Review scores
Source	Rating
AllMusic	5/5 stars
The Rolling Stone Jazz Record Guide	5/5 stars

The AllMusic review by Steve Huey stated, "The music is pure stream-of-consciousness -- no discernible pre-set themes, just free-flowing ideas and interaction among the musicians... It's a shame there aren't more documents of this phase in Rivers' career, though that could be said of pretty much all of his phases. If it's Rivers the free improviser you're looking for, Streams is a tour de force and one of the highlights of his extremely distinguished career".

== Track listing ==
All compositions by Sam Rivers

1. Spoken Introduction – 1:18
2. "Tenor Saxophone Section/Beginning of Flute Section" – 23:12
3. "Conclusion of Flute Section/Piano Section/Soprano Saxophone Section" –25:14

- Recorded at the 1973 Montreux Jazz Festival held in Montreux, Switzerland, on July 6, 1973

== Personnel ==
- Sam Rivers – soprano saxophone, tenor saxophone, flute, piano
- Cecil McBee – bass
- Norman Connors – drums, gongs
