= Sam Rivers (jazz musician) =

American jazz musician and composer (1923–2011)

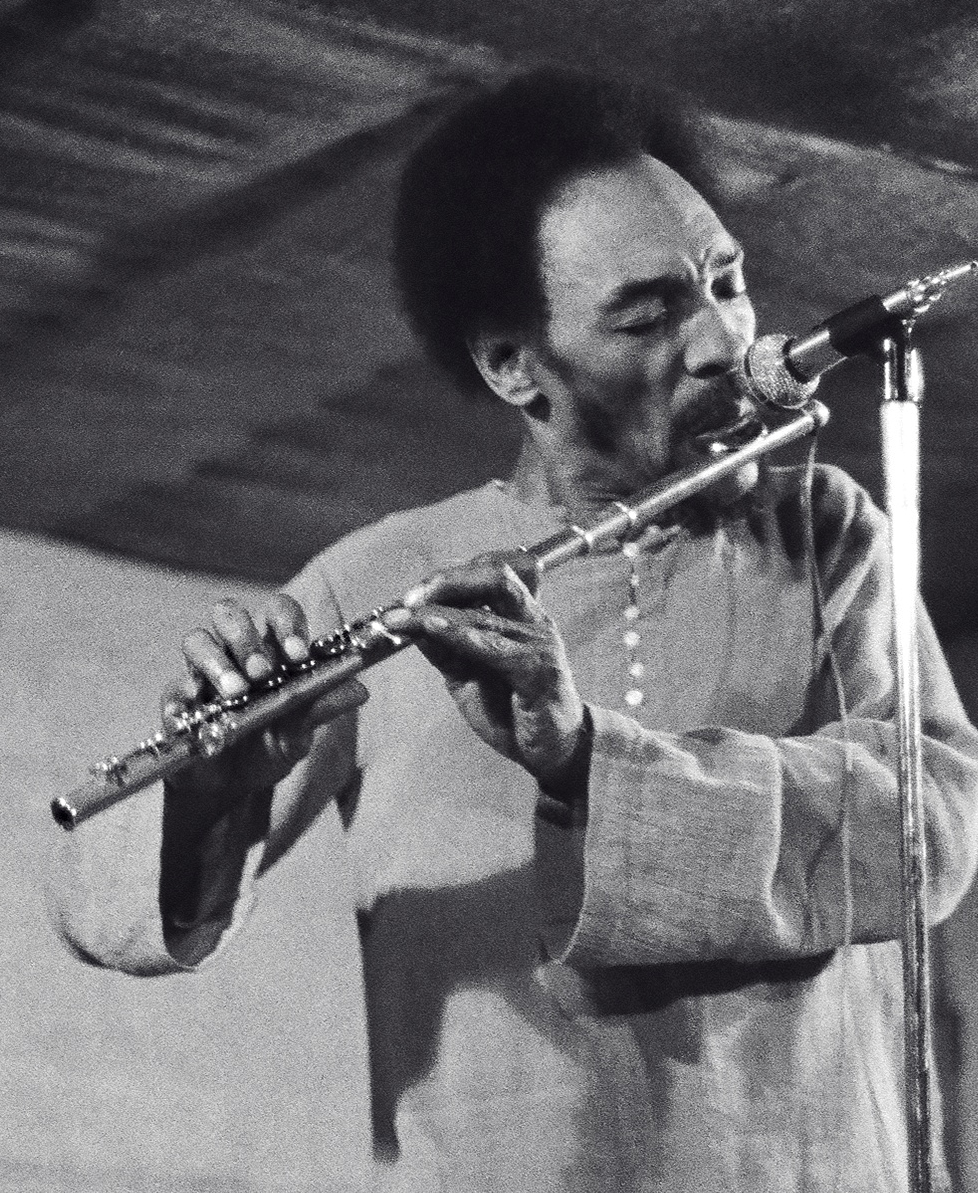
- Rivers at Studio Rivbea jazz loft, July 1976, New York City

Background information
- Also known as: Sammy
- Born: Samuel Carthorne Rivers; September 25, 1923; El Reno, Oklahoma, U.S.
- Died: December 26, 2011 (aged 88) Orlando, Florida, U.S.
- Genres: Jazz, avant-garde jazz, free jazz
- Occupations: Musician, bandleader, composer, educator
- Instruments: Tenor saxophone, soprano saxophone, bass clarinet, flute, harmonica, piano
- Years active: 1950s–2011
- Labels: Blue Note, Impulse, FMP, RCA, Nato, Postcards, Stunt, Timeless, Rivbea Sound, Posi-Tone, Marge
- Website: Sam Rivers

Samuel Carthorne Rivers (September 25, 1923 – December 26, 2011) was an American jazz musician and composer. Though most famously a tenor saxophonist, he also performed on soprano saxophone, bass clarinet, flute, harmonica, piano and viola.

Active in jazz since the early 1950s, he earned wider attention during the increased popularity of free jazz in the mid-1960s, a genre in which he was a prominent and influential artist.

== Early life ==
Rivers was born in El Reno, Oklahoma, United States. His father was a gospel musician who had sung with the Fisk Jubilee Singers and the Silverstone Quartet, exposing Rivers to music from an early age. His grandfather was Marshall W. Taylor, a religious leader from Kentucky. Rivers was stationed in California in the 1940s during a stint in the Navy. Here he performed semi-regularly with blues singer Jimmy Witherspoon. Rivers moved to Boston, Massachusetts, in 1947, where he studied at the Boston Conservatory with Alan Hovhaness.

He performed with Quincy Jones, Herb Pomeroy, Tadd Dameron and others.

== Blue Note era ==
In 1959, Rivers began performing with 13-year-old drummer Tony Williams. Rivers was briefly a member of the Miles Davis Quintet in 1964, partly on Williams's recommendation. This edition of the quintet released a single live album, Miles in Tokyo, from a show recorded on July 14 at Kohseinenkin Hall. Rivers' tenure with the quintet was brief: he had engagements in Boston, and his playing style was too avant-garde for Davis during this period; he was replaced by Wayne Shorter shortly thereafter.

Rivers was signed by Blue Note Records, for whom he recorded four albums as leader and made several sideman appearances. Among noted sidemen on his own Blue Note albums were Jaki Byard, who appears on Fuchsia Swing Song (1964), Herbie Hancock and Freddie Hubbard. He appeared on Blue Note recordings by Tony Williams, Andrew Hill and Larry Young.

Rivers derived his music from bebop, but he was an adventurous player, adept at free jazz. The first of his Blue Note albums, Fuchsia Swing Song, adopts an approach sometimes called "inside-outside". Here the performer frequently obliterates the explicit harmonic framework ("going outside") but retains a hidden link so as to be able to return to it in a seamless fashion. Rivers brought the conceptual tools of bebop harmony to a new level in this process, united at all times with the ability to "tell a story", which Lester Young had laid down as a benchmark for the jazz improviser.

His powers as a composer were also in evidence in this period: the ballad "Beatrice" from Fuchsia Swing Song has become an important standard, particularly for tenor saxophonists. For instance, it is the first cut on Joe Henderson's 1985 The State of the Tenor, Vols. 1 & 2, and Stan Getz recorded it during the 1989 sessions eventually issued as Bossas & Ballads – The Lost Sessions.

== Loft era ==
During the 1970s, Rivers and his wife, Beatrice, ran a jazz loft called "Studio Rivbea" in New York City's NoHo district. It was located on Bond Street in Lower Manhattan and was originally opened as a public performance space as part of the first New York Musicians Festival in 1970. Critic John Litweiler has written that "In New York Loft Jazz meant Free Jazz in the Seventies" and Studio Rivbea was "the most famous of the lofts". The loft was important in the development of jazz because it was an example of artists creating their own performance spaces and taking responsibility for presenting music to the public. This allowed for music to be free of extra-musical concerns that would be present in a nightclub or concert hall situation. A series of recordings made at the loft were issued under the title Wildflowers on the Douglas label.

Rivers was also recruited by Clifford Thornton to lead a student world-music/free-jazz ensemble at Wesleyan University in 1971. During this era Rivers continued to record, including several albums for Impulse!: Streams, recorded live at Montreux, Hues (both records contain different trio performances later collated on CD as Trio Live), the quartet album Sizzle and his first big-band disc, Crystals; perhaps his best-known work from this period though is his appearance on Dave Holland's Conference of the Birds, in the company of Anthony Braxton and Barry Altschul.

== Later career ==
In the early 1990s, he and his wife moved to Florida, in part to expand his orchestra compositions with a reading band in Orlando. This band became the longest-running incarnation of the RivBea Orchestra. He performed regularly with his Orchestra and Trio with bassist Doug Mathews and drummer Anthony Cole (later replaced by Rion Smith.) From 1996 to 1998 he toured and recorded three projects for Nato Records in France with pianist Tony Hymas and others. In 1998, with the assistance of Steve Coleman, he recorded two Grammy-nominated big-band albums for RCA Victor with the RivBea All-Star Orchestra, Culmination and Inspiration (the title-track is an elaborate reworking of Dizzy Gillespie's "Tanga": Rivers was in Gillespie's band near the end of the trumpeter's life). Other late albums of note include Portrait, a solo recording for FMP, and Vista, a trio with drummers Adam Rudolph and Harris Eisenstadt for Meta. During the late 1990s he appeared on several albums on Postcards Records.

In 2005, he released Aurora, a third CD featuring compositions for his Rivbea Orchestra and the first CD featuring members of his working orchestra in Orlando. 2011 saw the release of Trilogy, a three-CD box set featuring 22 previously-unheard compositions performed by many of the same musicians.

Rivers died from pneumonia on December 26, 2011, at the age of 88 in Orlando, Florida.

During 2019–2022, NoBusiness Records issued six live albums as part of their Sam Rivers Archive Series, featuring previously unreleased music drawn from Rivers's extensive collection of recordings.

== Discography ==
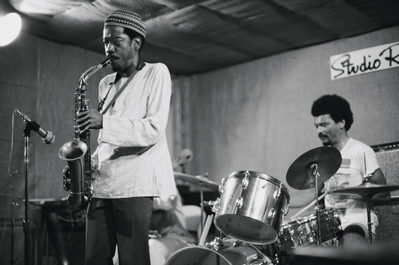
Jemeel Moondoc and Rashid Bakr at Studio Rivbea July, 1976

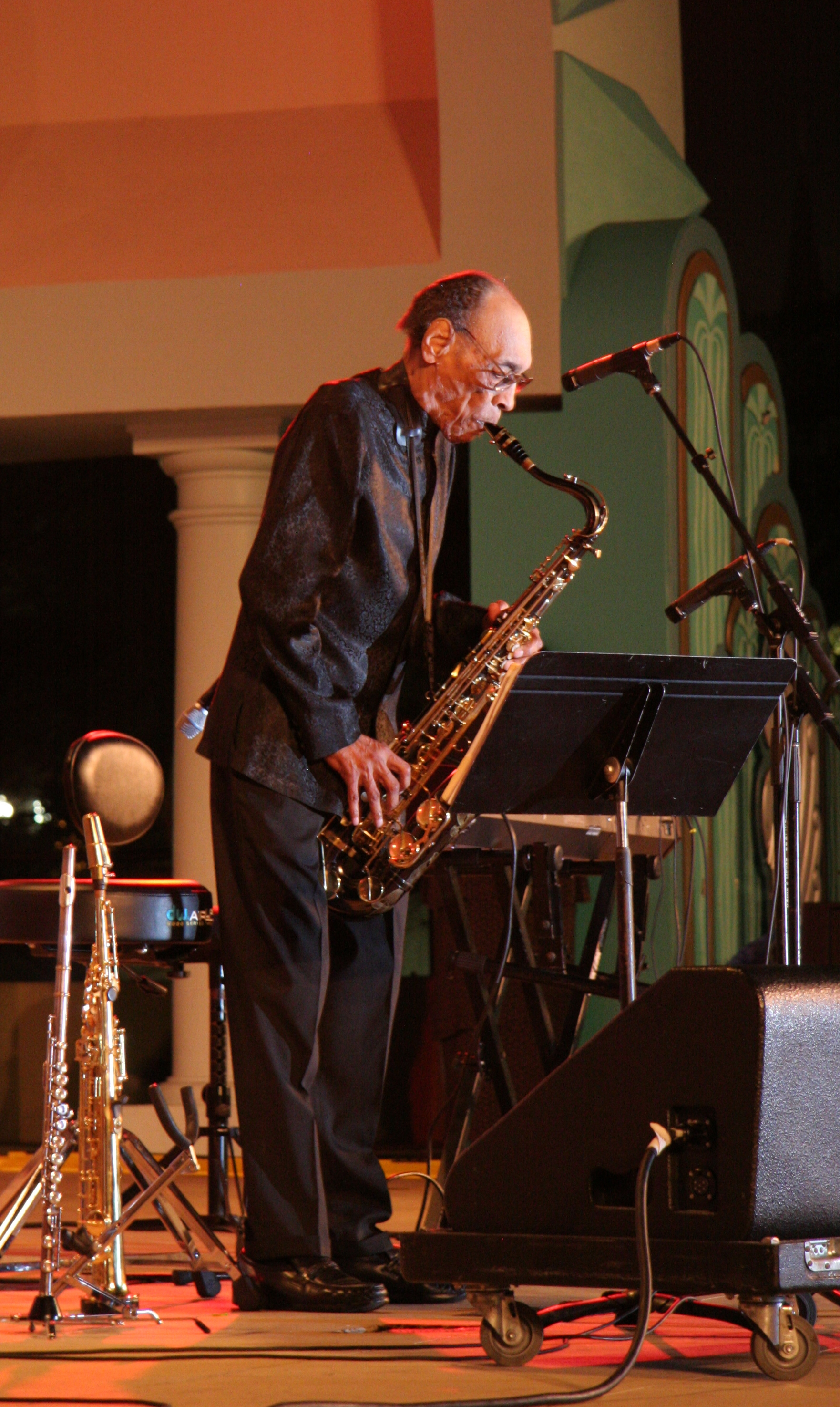
Lake Eola, Orlando Fl in 2008

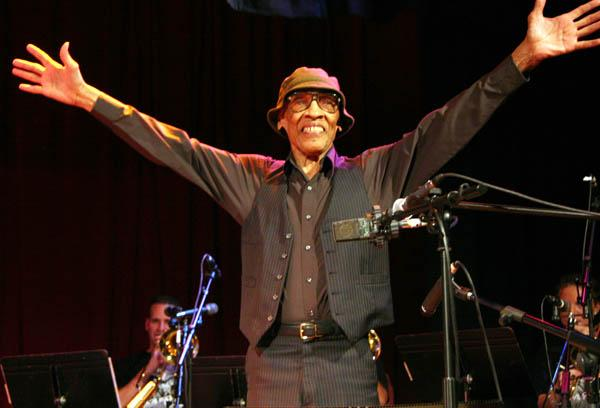
Sam Rivers in Orlando, Florida in 2007

=== As leader ===
- 1964: Fuchsia Swing Song (Blue Note, 1965)
- 1965: Contours (Blue Note, 1967)
- 1966: A New Conception (Blue Note, 1967)
- 1967: Dimensions & Extensions (Blue Note, 1986)
- 1971: Archive Series Volume 1 - Emanation (NoBusiness, 2019) with Cecil McBee and Norman Connors
- 1973: Streams (Impulse!, 1973) – live
- 1971–73: Hues (Impulse!, 1974) – live
- 1972–1973: The Live Trio Sessions (Impulse!, 1978) contains tracks from Streams and Hues, plus previously unissued material; reissued on CD as Trio Live (1998)
- 1974: Crystals (Impulse!, 1974)
- 1975: Sizzle (Impulse!, 1976)
- 1973–76: Jazz of the Seventies (Circle, 1977)
- 1976: The Tuba Trio Vols. 1-3 (Circle, 1977)
- 1976: The Quest (Red, 1976)
- 1976: Black Africa! Villalago (Horo, 1977)
- 1976: Black Africa! Perugia (Horo, 1977)
- 1977: Paragon (Fluid, 1977)
- 1977: Archive Series Volume 2 - Zenith (NoBusiness, 2019) with Joe Daley, Dave Holland, Barry Altschul, and Charlie Persip
- 1978: Archive Series Volume 3 - Ricochet (NoBusiness, 2020) with Dave Holland, and Barry Altschul
- 1978: Waves (Tomato, 1979)
- 1979: Archive Series Volume 4 - Braids (NoBusiness, 2020) with Joe Daley, Dave Holland, and Thurman Barker
- 1979: Live in Vancouver (Condition West, 2017)
- 1979: Contrasts (ECM, 1980)
- 1981: "Crosscurrent" - Live At Jazz Unité (Blue Marge, 1982) – live
- 1981: Archive Series Volume 5 - Undulation (NoBusiness, 2021) with Jerry Byrd, Rael-Wesley Grant, and Steve Ellington
- 1982: Colours (Black Saint, 1983)
- 1989: Lazuli (Timeless, 1990)
- 1995: Portrait (FMP, 1997)
- 1996: Concept with Anthony Cole, Doug Mathews (Rivbea Sound, 1997)
- 1998: Inspiration (RCA Victor/BMG, 1999)
- 1998: Culmination (RCA Victor/BMG France, 1999)
- 1999: Aurora (Rivbea Sound, 2005)
- 2000: Firestorm (Rivbea Sound, 2002)
- 2002: Archive Series Volume 6 - Caldera (NoBusiness, 2022) with Doug Mathews and Anthony Cole
- 2003: Celebration (Posi-Tone, 2004)
- 2008–09: Mosaic Select: Trilogy with the Rivbea Orchestra (Mosaic, 2011)[3CD]

=== As co-leader ===
- 1976: with Dave Holland - Dave Holland / Sam Rivers (Improvising Artists)
- 1976: with Dave Holland - Sam Rivers / Dave Holland Vol. 2 (Improvising Artists)
- 1977: with Mario Schiano - Rendez-vous (Vedette)
- 1977: with James Newton - Flutes! (Circle)
- 1983: with Stephen McCraven - Intertwining Spirits (Freelance)
- 1995: with Improvisors Pool (Alexander von Schlippenbach) - Backgrounds for Improvisors (FMP)
- 1996: with Noël Akchoté / Tony Hymas / Paul Rogers / Jacques Thollot - Configuration (nato)
- 1996: with Julian Priester - Hints on Light and Shadow (Postcards)
- 1997: with Alexander von Schlippenbach - Tangens (FMP)
- 1997: with Tony Hymas, Noël Akchoté, Paul Rogers, and Jacques Thollot - Lyon 29.03.1997 (Noël Akchoté Downloads, 2018)
- 1998: with Tony Hymas - Eight Day Journal (nato)
- 1998: with Tony Hymas - Winter Garden (nato)
- 2002: with Doug Mathews, Anthony Cole, Jonathan Powell and David Manson - Fluid Motion (isospin labs)
- 2003: with Adam Rudolph / Harris Eisenstadt - Vista (Meta)
- 2004: with Ben Street / Kresten Osgood & Bryan Carrott - Purple Violets (Stunt)
- 2004: with Ben Street / Kresten Osgood - Violet Violets (Stunt)
- 2007: with Dave Holland / Barry Altschul - Reunion: Live in New York (Pi, 2012)

=== Compilations ===
- The Complete Blue Note Sam Rivers Sessions (Mosaic, 1996)

=== As sideman ===
With Roots

- Salutes the Saxophone - Tributes to John Coltrane, Dexter Gordon, Sonny Rollins and Lester Young (In & Out, 1992)
- Stablemates (In & Out, 1993)

With Tony Williams

- 1964: Life Time (Blue Note, 1965)
- 1965: Spring (Blue Note, 1966)

With Reggie Workman

- Summit Conference (Postcards, 1993)
- Cerebral Caverns (Postcards, 1995)

With others

- Barry Altschul, You Can't Name Your Own Tune (Muse, 1977)
- Steven Bernstein, Diaspora Blues (Tzadik, 2002)
- Miles Davis, Miles in Tokyo (Columbia, 1969) – rec. 1964
- Bruce Ditmas, What If (Postcards, 1994)
- Brian Groder, Torque (Latham, 2007)
- Andrew Hill, Change (Blue Note, 1966)
- The Dave Holland Quartet Conference of the Birds, (ECM, 1973)
- John Lee Hooker, Free Beer and Chicken (ABC, 1974)
- Bobby Hutcherson, Dialogue (Blue Note, 1965)
- Franklin Kiermyer, Kairos (Evidence, 1996)
- NOJO, City of Neighbourhoods (True North, 2004) – rec. 2003
- Jason Moran, Black Stars (Blue Note, 2001)
- Music Revelation Ensemble (James Blood Ulmer), In the Name of... (DIW, 1993)
- Don Pullen, Capricorn Rising (Black Saint, 1975)
- Kazuko Shiraishi, Dedicated to the Late John Coltrane and Other Jazz Poems (Musicworks, 1977)
- Cecil Taylor, The Great Concert of Cecil Taylor (Prestige, 1977) – rec. 1969
- Larry Young, Into Somethin' (Blue Note, 1964)
