= Conference of the Birds (Dave Holland album) =

Studio album by the Dave Holland Quartet
- Released: 1973
- Recorded: 30 November 1972
- Studio: Allegro Studio (New York City)
- Genre: Avant-garde jazz; free jazz; post-bop
- Length: 39:38
- Label: ECM 1027 ST
- Producer: Manfred Eicher

Dave Holland chronology
Improvisations for Cello and Guitar (1971)	Conference of the Birds (1973)	Dave Holland / Sam Rivers (1976)

Dave Holland Quartet chronology
Conference of the Birds (1972)	Extensions (1990)

Conference of the Birds is an album by the Dave Holland Quartet, recorded on 30 November 1972 and released on ECM the following year—Holland's debut as bandleader and fourth project for the label. The quartet features alto saxophonist Anthony Braxton, tenor saxophonist Sam Rivers, and percussionist Barry Altschul.

== Background ==
Dave Holland and Barry Altschul first played together during 1970 in a trio with pianist Chick Corea, recording the album The Song of Singing in April of that year. In August, Braxton joined the group, forming the short-lived Circle quartet. Circle began to show signs of splintering in early 1971: while in London, Braxton began focusing on his own compositions, recording The Complete Braxton with the members of Circle plus trumpeter Kenny Wheeler, while Corea turned toward more accessible music, recording two volumes of solo piano improvisations. Meanwhile, Holland and Altschul began working in a trio with multi-instrumentalist Sam Rivers, but were soon invited to join Braxton's new quartet, which initially included Wheeler. Circle played its final concert during the summer of 1971, and, for a time, the bassist and drummer played and recorded with both Braxton and Rivers, but eventually elected to join Rivers on a full-time basis, preferring the collective free improvisation of the trio format to Braxton's composition-oriented quartet. Conference of the Birds is unique in that it brought together Holland and Altschul with both Braxton and Rivers as sidemen, the only occasion on which the two reed players recorded together.

== Composition and recording ==
In the album liner notes, Holland described how birds would congregate each morning outside his London apartment and join with one another, "each declaring its freedom in song." He stated that, on the recording, his intent was to "share this same spirit with other musicians and communicate it to the people."

Holland's compositions for this album had originally been performed live in New York City by a quintet including trumpeter Randy Brecker, tenor saxophonist Michael Brecker, guitarist Ralph Towner and Altschul; "Braxton and Rivers, however, were chosen for the recording as better able to respond to the opportunist disjunctions offered within Holland's compositions."

Each piece on the album is "open form," with a theme stated at the beginning to set key, tempo, and mood. The players are then free to improvise in whatever direction they choose. Stuart Nicholson writes: "Conference of the Birds emerged as a definitive statement of swinging free expression. It was, in essence, a return to the rugged discipline of early 1960s free improvising by working off melodic foundations using the 'time, no changes' principle to achieve greater control over that elusive quarry, freedom."

== Reception ==
Professional ratings
Review scores
Source	Rating
All Music Guide to Jazz	(favorable)
AllMusic	5/5 stars
The Penguin Guide to Jazz	(Core Collection)
The Rolling Stone Jazz Record Guide	5/5 stars
The Village Voice	A
Tom Hull	A

The Penguin Guide to Jazz selected the album as part of its "Core Collection," and gave it a rating of four stars (of a possible four).

In the All Music Guide to Jazz, jazz critic Michael G. Nastos called the album Holland's "finest hour" and "definitive progressive music." Steve Huey of AllMusic called Conference of the Birds "one of the all-time avant-garde jazz classics, incorporating a wide spectrum of '60s innovations... This album is a basic requirement for any avant-garde jazz collection, and it's also one of the most varied and accessible introductions to the style one could hope for."

The Rolling Stone Jazz Record Guide said the album "only gets more impressive as time passes."

== Track listing ==
All tracks are written by Dave Holland.

Side I
No.	Title	Length
1.	"Four Winds"	6:32
2.	"Q & A"	8:34
3.	"Conference of the Birds"	4:34
Total length:		19:40

Side II
No.	Title	Length
1.	"Interception"	8:20
2.	"Now Here (Nowhere)"	4:34
3.	"See-Saw"	6:40
Total length:		19:34 39:24

== Personnel ==
=== Dave Holland Quartet ===
- Anthony Braxton – alto saxophone, clarinet, flute
- Sam Rivers – tenor saxophone, clarinet, flute
- Dave Holland – double bass
- Barry Altschul – percussion, marimba
