= NoBusiness Records =

Lithuanian record label

- Founded: 2008
- Founder: Danas Mikailionis and Valerij Anosov
- Genre: Free jazz, free improvisation
- Country of origin: Lithuania
- Location: Vilnius
- Official website: nobusinessrecords.com

NoBusiness Records is an independent record label, based in Vilnius, Lithuania.

== History ==
The label was founded in 2008 by Danas Mikailionis and Valerij Anosov. The latter is the owner of a jazz-oriented record store in Vilnius named Thelonious; according to Mikailionis, it is "probably the only store in Vilnius where one can find non-commercial music." Prior to starting the label, Mikailionis and Anosov put on concerts that featured artists such as William Parker, Matthew Shipp, Howard Riley, Joe McPhee, and Barry Guy. However, it was saxophonist Mats Gustafsson who, after performing a solo set, as well as one with Lithuanian musicians, encouraged them to found their own record label. Gustafsson's performances were issued as The Vilnius Implosion (solo), the label's first CD release, and The Vilnius Explosion (ensemble), their first vinyl release.

In 2010, NoBusiness began working with musicologist Ed Hazell on historical multiple-CD collections, such as The Complete Recordings 1981–1983 by the band Commitment, featuring William Parker, Will Connell, Jr., Jason Kao Hwang, and Zen Matsuura, Jemeel Moondoc's Muntu Recordings, and William Parker's Centering: Unreleased Early Recordings 1976–1987. In 2017, the label initiated a collaboration with the Japanese Chap Chap label, starting with the release of The Conscience, by trombonist Paul Rutherford and drummer Sabu Toyozumi. In 2019, NoBusiness issued the first CD in a six-volume Sam Rivers archival series.l In a 2023 interview, Mikailionis stated that the label will also continue to document early European free jazz, with releases by groups such as Total Music Association, Modern Jazz Quintet Karlsruhe, and Free Jazz Group Wiesbaden.

== Practices ==
Writer Peter Margasak praised NoBusiness's "DIY spirit and passion," and noted that their focus on free jazz can be seen as a response to the fact that, after the Soviet era in Lithuania, "jazz lost its subversive status," and "commercial treacle came flooding in." The label has consistently focused on quality and attention to detail; Mikailionis stated: "We don't want to release music only for the sake of releasing it. That's why we put great attention to the selection of the projects planned for the future."

Since its inception, NoBusiness has issued both CDs and vinyl records. According to Mikailionis, "Visual aesthetic enjoyment combined with the process of listening to vinyl makes it a much greater pleasure for us than listening to a CD." Most releases can also be downloaded in digital format.

== Reception ==
Clifford Allen of All About Jazz called NoBusiness Records "a startlingly active imprint with an extraordinary deep catalogue," and wrote that the label "has clearly emerged as the current cultural ambassador for Lithuania." Writers for The Free Jazz Collective praised the fact that, "over the years, NoBusiness has been dedicated to unearthing and releasing long-unheard music from a number of musicians," and noted that the Sam Rivers Archive Series "looks to be a beautiful physical manifestation of the love and respect that NoBusiness Record's Danas Mikailionis has for NYC loft era free jazz." Author Daniel Fischlin stated that the label is "devoted to an impressive catalogue of performers working across free jazz and improvised music and expanding the space for non-commercial creative voicings that disrupt mainstream music."
