= The Tonight Show Band (disambiguation) =

The Tonight Show Band is usually the name used by the current house band on NBC's late night talk show The Tonight Show. It may refer to:

- The Tonight Show Band with Doc Severinsen
- Kevin Eubanks and The Tonight Show Band
- Max Weinberg and The Tonight Show Band
- Rickey Minor and The Tonight Show Band
- The Roots, the current band for The Tonight Show Starring Jimmy Fallon, but not formally called "The Tonight Show Band"
