= Mental Images (album) =

Studio album by Robin Eubanks
- Released: 1994
- Recorded: April 1994
- Studio: Power Station, New York City
- Genre: Jazz
- Length: 43:56
- Label: JMT; JMT 514 017
- Producer: Stefan F. Winter & Robin Eubanks

Robin Eubanks chronology
Karma (1990)	Mental Images (1994)	Wake Up Call (1997)

Mental Images is an album by trombonist Robin Eubanks which was recorded in 1994 and released on the JMT label.

== Reception ==
Professional ratings
Review scores
Source	Rating
AllMusic	3/5 stars
The Penguin Guide to Jazz Recordings	3/4 stars

AllMusic gave the album 3 stars. The Rough Guide to Jazz called it a "gutsy album, which embraces M-Base and other styles".

== Track listing ==
All compositions by Robin Eubanks

1. "Matatape" - 8:29
2. "Mental Images" - 8:54
3. "Union 2 - Brotherly Love" - 3:50
4. "Collage" - 7:07
5. "Skin 'n' Bones" - 9:14
6. "For What Might Have Been" - 4:07
7. "X-Base" - 7:31
8. "Egoli (Formerly Johannesburg)" - 6:08
9. "CP-Time" - 3:04

== Personnel ==
- Robin Eubanks - electric and acoustic trombone, vocals, cowbell, sampler
- Randy Brecker - trumpet (tracks 2 & 7)
- Antonio Hart - alto saxophone, tenor saxophone (tracks 1, 2, 4, 7)
- Kevin Eubanks - acoustic guitar, cowbell, synthbass, (tracks 1–3, 6 & 7)
- Michael Cain - piano, synthesizer (tracks 1, 2, 4)
- Kenny Davis - electric bass (tracks 1 & 7)
- Dave Holland - acoustic bass (tracks 2, 4 & 8)
- Gene Jackson (tracks 1, 2, 4), Marvin "Smitty" Smith (tracks 5 & 7) - drums
- Kimati Dinizulu - African percussion, berimbau (tracks 1, 4 & 8)
- Adrian von Ripka, Carlos Albrecht, Stefan Winter - vocals (track 1)
