= Overtime (album) =

Studio album by the Dave Holland Big Band
- Released: February 22, 2005
- Recorded: November, 2002
- Studio: Avatar (New York, New York)
- Genre: Jazz
- Length: 78:39
- Label: Dare2/Sunnyside
- Producer: Dave Holland

Dave Holland chronology
Extended Play: Live at Birdland (2003)	Overtime (2005)	Critical Mass (2006)

Overtime is an album by the Dave Holland Big Band that won the Grammy Award for Best Large Jazz Ensemble Album in 2005.

== Background ==
Recorded in 2002, the music centers on the four-movement "Monterey Suite", a piece commissioned by the Monterey Jazz Festival. The big band on this record is on the “small” side, at thirteen players. The rhythm section consists of Holland with vibraphonist Steve Nelson and drummer Billy Kilson (the last Holland project on which he would appear), continuing the format established over many of Holland’s Quintet records. Featured players include tenor saxophonist Chris Potter, alto saxophonist Antonio Hart, trumpeter Alex Sipiagin and trombonist Robin Eubanks. This is Holland's first album since departing ECM, through which he had released nearly all of his albums since his 1972 debut Conference of the Birds, for his own Dare2 label.

== Reception ==
The Allmusic review by Thom Jurek awarded the album 4 stars, stating, "This is an essential Holland date, it is exciting, colorful and wildly innovative", and the critic of The Guardian called it, "contemporary jazz big band playing at its very best."

Russ Musto of All About Jazz wrote "Overtime, the second release from the Dave Holland Big Band, is another impressive work by the Grammy-winning large ensemble. Assembled around the legendary bassist's working quintet, the thirteen-piece unit explores the greater harmonic implications of the leader's creative compositions, without sacrificing the special rhythmic character the smaller group possesses. Built from the bottom up upon the rock solid foundation of Holland's great big bass sound with Billy Kilson's atypical drumming and Steve Nelson's vibraphone and marimba (in lieu of piano) contributing greatly to its unique sound, the aggregation has a distinctive quality that is simultaneously classic and cutting edge."

Professional ratings
Review scores
Source	Rating
AllMusic	4/5 stars
The Guardian	4/5 stars
PopMatters	7/10
Tom Hull	B+
The Penguin Guide to Jazz Recordings	3/4 stars

== Track listing ==
All compositions by Dave Holland except where indicated.

1. "Monterey Suite I - Bring It On" – 11:58
2. "Monterey Suite II - Free for All" – 17:37
3. "Monterey Suite III - A Time Remembered" – 11:45
4. "Monterey Suite IV - Happy Jammy" – 9:36
5. "Ario" – 11:08
6. "Mental Images" (Robin Eubanks) – 9:22
7. "Last Minute Man" – 7:13

== Personnel ==
- Dave Holland – double bass, arranger, producer
- Antonio Hart – flute, alto saxophone, soprano saxophone
- Mark Gross – alto saxophone
- Chris Potter – tenor saxophone
- Gary Smulyan – baritone saxophone
- Alex Sipiagin – flugelhorn, trumpet
- Taylor Haskins – flugelhorn, trumpet
- Duane Eubanks – flugelhorn, trumpet
- Robin Eubanks – trombone
- Jonathan Arons – trombone
- Josh Roseman – trombone
- Steve Nelson – vibraphone, marimba
- Billy Kilson – drums
- Louise Holland – producer
- James Farber – engineer
- Brian Montgomery – assistant engineer
- Greg Calbi – mastering
