= Without Deception =

Studio album by Kenny Barron Dave Holland Trio
- Released: March 6, 2020
- Recorded: August 17–18, 2019
- Studios: Oktaven Studios, Mount Vernon, NY
- Genre: Jazz
- Length: 65:32
- Label: Dare2 Records
- Producer: Dave Holland

Kenny Barron chronology
Concentric Circles (2018)	Without Deception (2020)	The Source (2023)

Dave Holland chronology
Uncharted Territories (2018)	Without Deception (2020)	Another Land (2021)

Professional ratings
Review scores
Source	Rating
All About Jazz	4/5 stars
AllMusic	4/5 stars
DownBeat	3.5/5 stars
Financial Times	4/5 stars
The Guardian	4/5 stars
Jazz Journal	4/5 stars
Jazzwise	3/5 stars
The Scotsman	4/5 stars
The Times	4/5 stars
Tom Hull	A−

Without Deception is a studio album by pianist Kenny Barron and English jazz bassist Dave Holland, featuring drummer Johnathan Blake. The album was released on March 6, 2020 by Dare2, Holland's own label. The album was recorded in Mount Vernon, New York, and consists of 10 compositions, including the Thelonious Monk's rarity "Worry Later".

== Background ==
The collaboration between Kenny Barron and Dave Holland goes back some 35 years to the mid-1980s. In that time, Barron's trio created the album Scratch. Five years after their last collaboration (The Art of Conversation, Impulse!, 2014), Barron and Holland met again, this time for a trio session with drummer Johnathan Blake. He had previously worked with Barron on his trio album Book of Intuition (2016) and on the quintet album Concentric Circles (2018), but had no playing experience with Holland.

The vinyl version of the album contains two bonus tracks: Johnathan Blake's "Can Tomorrow Be Brighter" and Kenny Wheeler's "Mabel."

== Reception ==
Chris Pearson of The Times commented, "It’s been five years since Kenny Barron and Dave Holland last recorded together, on the duo album The Art of Conversation. This time the pianist and bassist have added a drummer, Johnathan Blake, from Barron’s trio. The result is like a calmer version of the pianist’s last trio album, Book of Intuition, from 2016, with Holland’s English restraint tempering the forcefulness of the two Americans." Writing for All About Jazz, Mike Jurkovic stated, "Now we have Without Deception, one of the truest album titles ever, with the kinetically effusive Johnathan Blake sitting in behind the skins, making Without Deception a vital amalgam of style and understanding. A virtual lesson we all need to learn is how three people can communicate without stepping on, cursing out, insulting, agitating, or p-ssing off either of the others at the table."

A Dusty Groove's review stated, "Barron's at his roundest, most soulful sort of tone – really grabbing the notes out of the air in this wonderful way – and Holland really follows suit too, with this very personal, organic approach that's such a change from some of his more experimental work of years back – and which makes him a stunning part of the group, especially at all those many moments when he and Barron dance around each other's sound with this beautifully resonant vibe." Mike Hobart of Financial Times added, "Barron’s multi-faceted approach was matched by Holland avoiding the obvious without losing sight of the tune, and Blake’s rhythms inspired rather than intruded. The result was a performance packed with detail and strong in narrative drive." John Fordham writing for Jazzwise noted, "For fans of Kenny Barron, a master of the art of acoustic piano-trio jazz, Without Deception is often a captivating set—only a few more provocative surprises in the repertoire choices could have pushed it up another notch."

== Track listing ==
All tracks are written by Kenny Barron except as noted.

No.	Title	Writer(s)	Length
1.	"Porto Alegri"		5:20
2.	"Second Thoughts"	Mulgrew Miller	5:51
3.	"Without Deception"		6:53
4.	"Until Then"		6:50
5.	"Speed Trap"		6:48
6.	"Secret Places"	Sumi Tonooka	6:58
7.	"Pass It On"	Dave Holland	6:01
8.	"Warm Valley"	Duke Ellington	7:39
9.	"I Remember When"	Holland	8:27
10.	"Worry Later"	Thelonious Monk	5:03
Total length:			1:05:50

== Personnel ==
- Dave Holland – bass
- Johnathan Blake – drums
- Kenny Barron – piano
