= Billy Kilson =

American jazz drummer (born 1962)

William Earl Kilson
- Born: August 2, 1962 (age 63); Washington, D.C., United States
- Occupation: Drummer
- Instrument(s): Drums, trumpet, trombone
- Years active: 1980–present

William Earl Kilson (born August 2, 1962) is an American jazz drummer.

Kilson was born in Washington, D.C.. He started on trumpet at ten, switched to trombone at 11, then to drums at 16. He studied at the Berklee College of Music from 1980 to 1985 and took private lessons from Alan Dawson during 1982–89. Following this he did a tour of Europe with Walter Davis.

He has played with Ahmad Jamal (1989), Dianne Reeves (1989–95), Greg Osby (1991), George Duke (1991–98), Steps Ahead (1993), Tim Hagans (1993 and subsequently), Terumasa Hino (1994–98), Bob James (1995 and subsequently), Dave Holland (since 1997), Bob Belden (1997) and Kevin Mahogany (1998). Other associations include Kirk Whalum, Freddie Jackson, Chris Botti, Donald Brown, Bob James, and Paula Cole.

Kilson is perhaps best known for his work with Holland. He plays on Holland's Grammy Award-nominated 1999 album Prime Directive and his Grammy-winning 2002 release What Goes Around.

Kilson has also led his own quartet ensemble along with James Genus and Tim Hagans. His debut release as a leader, Pots and Pans, appeared in 2006.

== Discography ==
=== As solo ===
- While Ur Sleepin' (Truspace, 2001) - as BK Groove Featuring Billy Kilson
- Pots & Pans (Arintha Star, 2006) - as Billy Kilson's B.K. Groove
- Descension Rising (2016) - as Billy Kilson Trio

=== As sideman ===
With Greg Osby

- Man-Talk for Moderns Vol. X (Blue Note, 1991)

With Dianne Reeves

- I Remember (Blue Note, 1991) - on tracks (1–4)
- Art & Survival (EMI, 1994) - on tracks (8 & 10)
- Quiet After the Storm (Blue Note, 1994) - on tracks (1–2, 5–6, 8-10 & 12)

With Bob Belden

- Princejazz (Somethin' Else, 1994)
- Purple Rain (Somethin' Else, 1994)
- When Doves Cry (Metro Blue, 1994)
- Tapestry (Jazz Heritage, 1998)
- Black Dahlia (Blue Note, 2001)

With Tim Hagans

- Audible Architecture (Blue Note, 1995)
- Animation Imagination (Blue Note, 1999)
- Re-Animation Live! (Blue Note, 1999)

With Jack Lee

- Into the Night (Truspace, 1996) - with Bob James, Hilary James, Mark Ledford and Toninho Horta
- From Belo to Seoul (Truspace, 1997) - with Toninho Horta

With Bob James

- Joined at the Hip (Warner Bros., 1996)
- Joy Ride (Warner Bros., 1999) - on "Joy Ride" and "Trade Winds"
- Take It from the Top (Koch, 2004)
- Urban Flamingo (Koch, 2006) - on "Niles A Head"
- Espresso (Evosound, 2018)
- Feel Like Making LIVE! (Evosound, 2022)

With Dave Holland

- Points of View (ECM, 1998)
- Prime Directive (ECM, 1999)
- Not for Nothin' ECM, 2001)
- What Goes Around (ECM, 2002)
- Extended Play: Live at Birdland (ECM, 2003)
- Overtime (Dare2, 2004)

With Carla Cook

- It's All About Love (MAXJAZZ, 1999)
- Dem Bones (MAXJAZZ, 2001)
- Simply Natural (MAXJAZZ, 2002)

With Bill Mobley

- Mean What You Say (Space Time, 1999) - on tracks (1–3, 6 & 8)
- Black Elk's Dream (Space Time, 2013) - a live album with Orchestre d'Auvergne

With Larry Carlton

- Deep Into It (Warner Bros., 2001)
- Sapphire Blue (Bluebird, 2003)
- Take Your Pick (335, 2010) - with Tak Matsumoto *Grammy Winner

With Donald Brown

- At This Point in My Life (Space Time, 2001) - with The Bush Messengers
- Autumn in New York (Space Time, 2002) - as Donald Brown Trio
- French Kiss (Space Time, 2002)

With Robin Eubanks

- Get 2 It (2001) - on tracks (2, 6 & 7) - with Mental Images
- Klassik Rock Vol. 1 (ArtistShare, 2014) - on tracks (6, 7 & 9) - with Mental Images

With Charene Dawn

- Dark Angel (Sirocco Jazz Limited, 2002)

With Michael Franks

- Watching the Snow (Koch, 2003)
- Time Together (Shanachie, 2011)
- The Music in My Head (P-Vine, 2018)

With Chris Botti

- When I Fall in Love (Columbia, 2004)
- To Love Again (Columbia, 2005)
- In Boston (Decca, 2009)

With Will Boulware

- Take Five (Eighty-Eight's, 2005)
- Summertime (Eighty-Eight's, 2007)

With others

- Milton Marsh, Continuum (Alicia-Miltrix, 1985) - on "I Wonder Why I Care" and "Smiles"
- Walter Beasley, Walter Beasley (Polydor, 1987) - on "Call Me"
- Terence Blanchard, Simply Stated (Columbia, 1992) - on "Detour Ahead"
- Billy Childs, Portrait of a Player (Windham Hill, 1993)
- Maria Muldaur, Jazzabelle (Stony Plain, 1993)
- Johnny Adams, The Verdict (Rounder, 1995)
- Takeshi "T.K." Ito, T.K. Covers (Atlantic, 1995) - as Billy Kielson
- Little Buster and the Soul Brothers, Right on Time! (Bullseye Blues, 1995) - on tracks (1–8, 10)
- Terumasa Hino-Masabumi Kikuchi Quintet, Acoustic Boogie (Somethin' Else, 1995)
- Terumasa Hino-Masabumi Kikuchi Quintet, Moment (Somethin' Else, 1996)
- Bill Evans, Escape (Escapade Music, 1996)
- Bop City, Hip Strut (Hip Bop, 1996)
- Andy McKee, Sound Roots (Mapleshade, 1997)
- Kevin Mahogany, My Romance (Warner Bros., 1998)
- Terumasa Hino, Re-Cover (Sweet Basil, 1999) - on tracks (3, 6, 7, 8 & 10)
- Tom Browne, R'N'Browne (Hip Bop, 1999)
- Onaje Allan Gumbs, Remember Their Innocence (1999)
- Nicolas Simion Trio, Nick at Night (PAO, 2000)
- Gil Goldstein, Disney Adventures in Jazz (AKA Disney Meets Jazz: Tribute to Walt Disney) (Walt Disney, 2001)
- Mike Gibbs, Nonsequence (Provocateur, 2001) - on tracks (3, 5–9)
- Joe Locke, State of Soul (Sirocco, 2002)
- Philip Bailey, Soul On Jazz (Heads Up, 2002)
- Eliane Elias, Dave Grusin, Herbie Hancock, Bob James, Brad Mehldau, Portrait of Bill Evans (JVC, 2002) - on tracks (1 & 4)
- John Stoddart, Wings to Walk This Road (Reprise, 2003)
- Steve Wilson, Soulful Song (MAXJAZZ, 2003)
- Josh Roseman, Treats for the Nightwalker (Enja, 2003)
- Lonnie Plaxico, Rhythm & Soul (Sirocco, 2003)
- Charles Blenzig, It's About Time (Double-Time, 2003)
- Continuum, Act One (Space Time, 2004)
- Antonio Hart, All We Need (Downtown Sound, 2004)
- Spyro Gyra, The Deep End (Heads Up, 2004) - on tracks (1, 4 & 10)
- Milligan-Eagles Project, Milligan-Eagles Project Featuring Billy Kilson (TetraArtist, 2005)
- The New Sound Quartet, Summertime (Eighty-Eight's, 2005)
- Taylor Eigsti, Lucky to Be Me (Concord Jazz, 2006)
- Austin Peralta, Maiden Voyage (Eighty-Eight's, 2006)
- Paula Cole, Courage (Decca, 2007)
- The Great Jazz Trio, Blue Minor (Eighty-Eight's, 2008)
- Yo-Yo Ma, Songs of Joy & Peace (Sony Classical, 2008)
- Tsuyoshi Niwa, At the End of the Day (2013)
- Richie Goods & Nuclear Fusion, Three Rivers (Richman Music Inc., 2015)
- Sedar Chin, SEDAR (Sedar Music 塞达音乐, 2016) - on tracks (3 & 11)
- Alice Soyer, Sky on Earth (Phlip Side, 2017)
- Shunzo Ohno, Dreamer (Pulsebeats, 2018) - on tracks (1 & 3)
- Gillian Margot, Power Flower (Ropeadope, 2020) - on "One Day I'll Fly Away"
- Bobby Lyle, Ivory Flow (New Warrior Music, 2022) - on "Tommy's Song"
