= Kevin Eubanks and The Tonight Show Band =

House band of The Tonight Show with Jay Leno

- Origin: New York, New York, U.S.
- Occupations: House band
- Years active: 1992–2010; 1992–1995 (as Branford Marsalis and The Tonight Show Band); 1995–2009, 2010 (as Kevin Eubanks and The Tonight Show Band); 2009–2010 (as Kevin Eubanks and the Primetime Band)
- Past members: Kevin Eubanks; Branford Marsalis; Ralph Moore; Kye Palmer; Lee Thornburg; Chuck Findley; Sal Marquez; Matt Finders; Gerry Etkins; Kenny Kirkland; Derrick "Dock" Murdock; Robert Hurst; Stanley Sargent; Marvin "Smitty" Smith; Jeff "Tain" Watts; Vicki Randle

Kevin Eubanks and The Tonight Show Band was the house band of The Tonight Show with Jay Leno. It previously served as the house band of The Jay Leno Show and was the house band of the first incarnation of The Tonight Show with Jay Leno from 1995 to 2009 and then for the first few months of the second incarnation of The Tonight Show with Jay Leno in 2010.

The band was active between 1992 and 2010, first as Branford Marsalis and the Tonight Show Band until 1995, when Kevin Eubanks took over The Tonight Show Band for the departing Marsalis. Eubanks had been a member of Marsalis's band since Leno's debut in 1992. Eubanks and the band moved, along with host Jay Leno, to The Jay Leno Show when it moved to prime time in 2009, performing under the title Kevin Eubanks and the Primetime Band. However, In February 2010, Eubanks announced that both he and the band would be leaving the show shortly after The Tonight Show with Jay Leno returned in March, Kevin Eubanks final appearance was In May 2010. Rickey Minor replaced Eubanks beginning June 2010, bringing with him his own band of musicians and forming Rickey Minor and The Tonight Show Band.

== Members ==
- Leader: Branford Marsalis (1992–1995), Kevin Eubanks (1995–2010)
- Guitar: Kevin Eubanks (1992–2010)
- Saxophone: Branford Marsalis (1992–1995), Ralph Moore
- Trumpet: Kye Palmer, Lee Thornburg, Chuck Findley, Sal Marquez
- Trombone: Matt Finders
- Keyboard: Gerry Etkins, Kenny Kirkland (1992–1998)
- Bass: Derrick "Dock" Murdock, Robert Hurst, Stanley Sargent
- Drums: Marvin "Smitty" Smith, Jeff "Tain" Watts
- Percussion/Vocals: Vicki Randle (1992–2009)
