= Extended Play: Live at Birdland =

Live album by the Dave Holland Quintet
- Released: 2003
- Recorded: November 21–24, 2001
- Venue: Birdland; New York City
- Genre: Jazz
- Length: 2:14:51
- Label: ECM; ECM 1864/65
- Producer: Dave Holland, Louise Holland

The Dave Holland Quintet chronology
What Goes Around (2002)	Extended Play: Live at Birdland (2003)	Overtime (2005)

Dave Holland Quintet chronology
Not for Nothin' (2001)	Extended Play: Live at Birdland (2003)

Professional ratings
Review scores
Source	Rating
AllMusic	4.5/5 stars
Sputnikmusic	4.5/5
The Guardian	5/5 stars
Tom Hull	B+
The Penguin Guide to Jazz Recordings	4/4 stars

Extended Play: Live at Birdland is a live double-album by the Dave Holland Quintet recorded at the Birdland jazz club over four days in November 2001 and released by ECM in 2003.

== Reception ==
Thom Jurek of AllMusic states

"Shockingly, Extended Play is Dave Holland's first live album for ECM, a label he has been associated with for 30 years! Holland's standing quintet—featuring trombonist Robin Eubanks, saxophonist Chris Potter, drummer Billy Kilson, and vibes and marimba virtuoso Steve Nelson—are, according to today's jazz standards, a veteran ensemble. On this Birdland date from 2001, they offer ample evidence as to why they are one of the most highly regarded ensembles in the music today. The material on this double-disc collection is, predictably enough, mostly taken from the band's studio releases. But that's where predictability ends. Virtually everything here is in wonderfully extended form, with only one tune clocking in under ten minutes... If ever there were a contender for jazz record of the year, for 2003, Extended Play is it."

== Track listing ==
All tracks are written by Dave Holland except as noted

Disc one
No.	Title	Writer(s)	Length
1.	"The Balance"		21:02
2.	"High Wire"	Chris Potter	15:21
3.	"Jugglers Parade"		18:27
4.	"Make Believe"		6:44
5.	"Free for All"		10:18
Total length:			1:11:52

Disc two
No.	Title	Writer(s)	Length
1.	"Claressence"		17:22
2.	"Prime Directive"		13:00
3.	"Bedouin Trail"		12:27
4.	"Metamorphos"	Robin Eubanks	20:10
Total length:			1:02:59 2:14:51

== Personnel ==
- Chris Potter – soprano, alto and tenor saxophones
- Robin Eubanks – trombone
- Steve Nelson – vibraphone, marimba
- Billy Kilson – drums
- Dave Holland – double-bass
