= What Goes Around (Dave Holland album) =

Studio album by the Dave Holland Big Band
- Released: 2002
- Recorded: January 2001
- Studios: Avatar, New York City
- Genre: Jazz
- Length: 76:15
- Labels: ECM; ECM 1777
- Producers: Dave Holland, Manfred Eicher

The Dave Holland Big Band chronology
| Not for Nothin' (2001) | What Goes Around (2002) | Extended Play: Live at Birdland (2003) |

Professional ratings
Review scores
| Source | Rating |
|---|---|
| AllMusic | 4/5 stars |
| Encyclopedia of Popular Music | 5/5 stars |
| The Penguin Guide to Jazz Recordings | 3.5/4 stars |
| Tom Hull | A− |

What Goes Around is the debut album by the Dave Holland Big Band recorded in January 2001 and released on ECM the following year. The ensemble—thirteen strong—features saxophonists Antonio Hart, Mark Gross, Chris Potter and Gary Smulyan, trombonists Robin Eubanks, Andre Hayward and Josh Roseman, trumpeters Earl Gardner, Alex Sipiagin and Duane Eubanks, vibraphonist Steve Nelson and drummer Billy Kilson.

== Background ==
The album features his working quintet of the period augmented to big band size with thirteen members. The record won Holland his first Grammy Award as a leader, in the category Best Large Jazz Ensemble Album. The album has seven tracks, all of which, except "Upswing", are re-arrangements of his previously recorded tunes. Richard S. Ginell's review on AllMusic describes these rearrangements as having "more urgency and more tension."

== Reception ==
John Eyles of BBC wrote "...this album is very promising. There are already quite a few milestone albums in Dave Holland's ECM recording career; Conference of the Birds, his stunning debut as a leader, Jumpin In, which introduced his first quintet, and Points of View, the first album from his current quintet, are just the most obvious ones. What Goes Around can be added to that list. In time, it will surely acquire significance as the debut album of Holland's Big Band. It is a solid beginning rather than a sparkling one, but it has many tantalising avenues that cry out to be developed further. As Holland himself has commented about this band, 'Something has been put in motion, and suddenly I see what the next ten years are going to be about.'"

== Track listing ==
1. "Triple Dance" - 9:50
2. "Blues for C.M." - 9:02
3. "The Razor's Edge" - 6:15
4. "What Goes Around" - 17:18
5. "Upswing" - 6:51
6. "First Snow" - 11:48
7. "Shadow Dance" - 14:43

== Personnel ==
=== Dave Holland Big Band ===
- Antonio Hart – alto saxophone, flute
- Mark Gross – alto saxophone
- Chris Potter – tenor saxophone
- Gary Smulyan – baritone saxophone
- Robin Eubanks, Andre Hayward, Josh Roseman – trombone
- Earl Gardner, Alex Sipiagin, Duane Eubanks – trumpet, flugelhorn
- Steve Nelson – vibraphone
- Dave Holland – double bass
- Billy Kilson – drums
