= The Art of Conversation =

Studio album by Dave Holland, Kenny Barron
- Released: October 14, 2014
- Recorded: March 5, 2014
- Studio: Avatar, New York City
- Genre: Jazz
- Length: 1:04:25
- Label: Impulse!
- Producer: Dave Holland, Kenny Barron, Karen Kennedy, Louise Holland

Dave Holland chronology
Prism (2013)	The Art of Conversation (2014)	Aziza (2016)

Kenny Barron chronology
Kenny Barron & the Brazilian Knights (2012)	Night and the City (2014)	Book of Intuition (2016)

Professional ratings
Review scores
Source	Rating
Allmusic	4/5 stars
Jazz Forum	5/5 stars
Jazzwise	4/5 stars
Tom Hull	B+

The Art of Conversation is a studio album by English jazz bassist Dave Holland and American jazz pianist Kenny Barron. The record was released via the Impulse! Records label on October 14, 2014. The album contains 10 compositions: a mix of jazz standards and original tunes. The Jazz Journalists Association (JJA) recognized the record as the Record of the Year 2014. Holland and Barron collaborated again in 2020, for their album Without Deception.

== Reception ==
Fred Kaplan writing for Stereophile noted, "The duet may be the most challenging form of jazz. Both musicians are on, all the time; there's no place to coast or hide. In a sense, this can be liberating. Pianists, say, can switch from melody to harmony to extended improvisation without worrying about whether the sax or trumpet will get in the way. But they'd better have something interesting to say, or the experiment in freedom will soon turn lame. Ditto for bass players: they can run scales or arpeggios for a while, but if that's all they can do, they're exposed as one-dimensional. Pianist Kenny Barron and bassist Dave Holland have massive chops, and a lot to say, so their new duet album, The Art of Conversation (on the revived Impulse! label) is everything the title suggests".

Shaun Brady of JazzTimes stated, "There are conversations meant solely for the ears of those involved, full of jocular camaraderie and inside references. And then there are those designed to be overheard, where the dialogue is meant to engage and enlighten anyone who is listening in as well as the speakers themselves. With a musical relationship dating back nearly three decades, pianist Kenny Barron and bassist Dave Holland could certainly engage in the former, but The Art of Conversation is a vivid example of the latter. These 10 tracks all showcase the profound mastery of two artists who share an easy rapport and elegantly restrained expressiveness". E. E. Bradman of Bass Player commented "This perfectly titled set of conversations is a sumptuous addition to the great canon of bass-and-piano duets, of which the recently departed Charlie Haden was a master. Without drums, you can hear the strength, idiosyncrasy, and tone of Holland’s masterful support, improvisation, and style".

== Track listing ==
No.	Title	Writer(s)	Length
1.	"The Oracle"	Dave Holland	6:16
2.	"The Only One"	Kenny Barron	6:23
3.	"Rain"	Kenny Barron	7:34
4.	"Segment"	Charlie Parker	5:59
5.	"Waltz for Wheeler" (Dedicated to Kenny Wheeler)	Dave Holland	6:12
6.	"In Walked Bud"	Thelonious Monk	6:23
7.	"In Your Arms"	Dave Holland	6:44
8.	"Dr. Do Right"	Dave Holland	5:15
9.	"Seascape"	Kenny Barron	6:10
10.	"Day Dream"	Duke Ellington / John La Touche / Billy Strayhorn	7:37
Total length:			1:04:25

== Personnel ==
Primary artists

- Kenny Barron – piano, producer
- Dave Holland – double bass, producer

Production

- Marielle Costosèque – artwork
- Karen Kennedy – co-producer
- Louise Holland – co-producer
- Patrice Beauséjour – cover
- Farida Bachir – executive producer, art direction
- John Murph – liner notes
- Greg Calbi – mastering
- Sylvain Gripoix – photography
- Aki Nishimura – recording
- James Farber – recording, mixing
- Jean-Philippe Allard – supervising

== Chart performance ==
Chart (2014)	Peak position
France (SNEP)	168
Belgium (Ultratop 50 Flanders)	189
Spain Albums Chart	33
