= Karma (Robin Eubanks album) =

Studio album by Robin Eubanks
- Released: May 1991
- Recorded: 1991
- Genre: Jazz
- Length: 62:31
- Labels: JMT; JMT 834 446
- Producer: Stefan F. Winter

Robin Eubanks chronology
Dedication (1989)	Karma (1991)	Mental Images (1994)

Karma is the third album by trombonist Robin Eubanks. It was recorded in 1991 and released on the JMT label.

== Reception ==
The AllMusic review by Scott Yanow said it was "quite a mixed bag."

Professional ratings
Review scores
Source	Rating
AllMusic	3/5 stars
The Penguin Guide to Jazz Recordings	3/4 stars

== Track listing ==
All compositions by Robin Eubanks except as indicated

1. "Karma" - 7:38
2. "Mino" - 5:41
3. "Maybe Next Time" - 5:51
4. "Evidently" - 5:50
5. "Send One Your Love" (Stevie Wonder) - 4:05
6. "Never Give Up" - 5:00
7. "The Yearning" - 9:20
8. "Pentacourse" - 6:31
9. "Resolution of Love" - 6:53
10. "Remember When" - 5:42

== Personnel ==
- Robin Eubanks - trombone, percussion, string samples, chorus, rap
- Kevin Eubanks - acoustic and electric guitar, chorus
- Marvin "Smitty" Smith - drums, chorus, rap
- Mino Cinelu - percussion, chorus
- Renee Rosnes - piano and keyboards (1, 2, 6, 7, 10), chorus
- Kenny Werner - keyboards (5)
- Lonnie Plaxico - electric bass (1, 5, 6)
- Dave Holland - bass (3, 4, 7–10), chorus
- Earl Gardner - trumpet (1, 10)
- Greg Osby - alto saxophone (1, 6)
- Branford Marsalis - tenor saxophone (7, 10)
- Kimson "Kism" Albert - rap (1)
- Cassandra Wilson - vocals (9)
