= Rickey Minor and The Tonight Show Band =

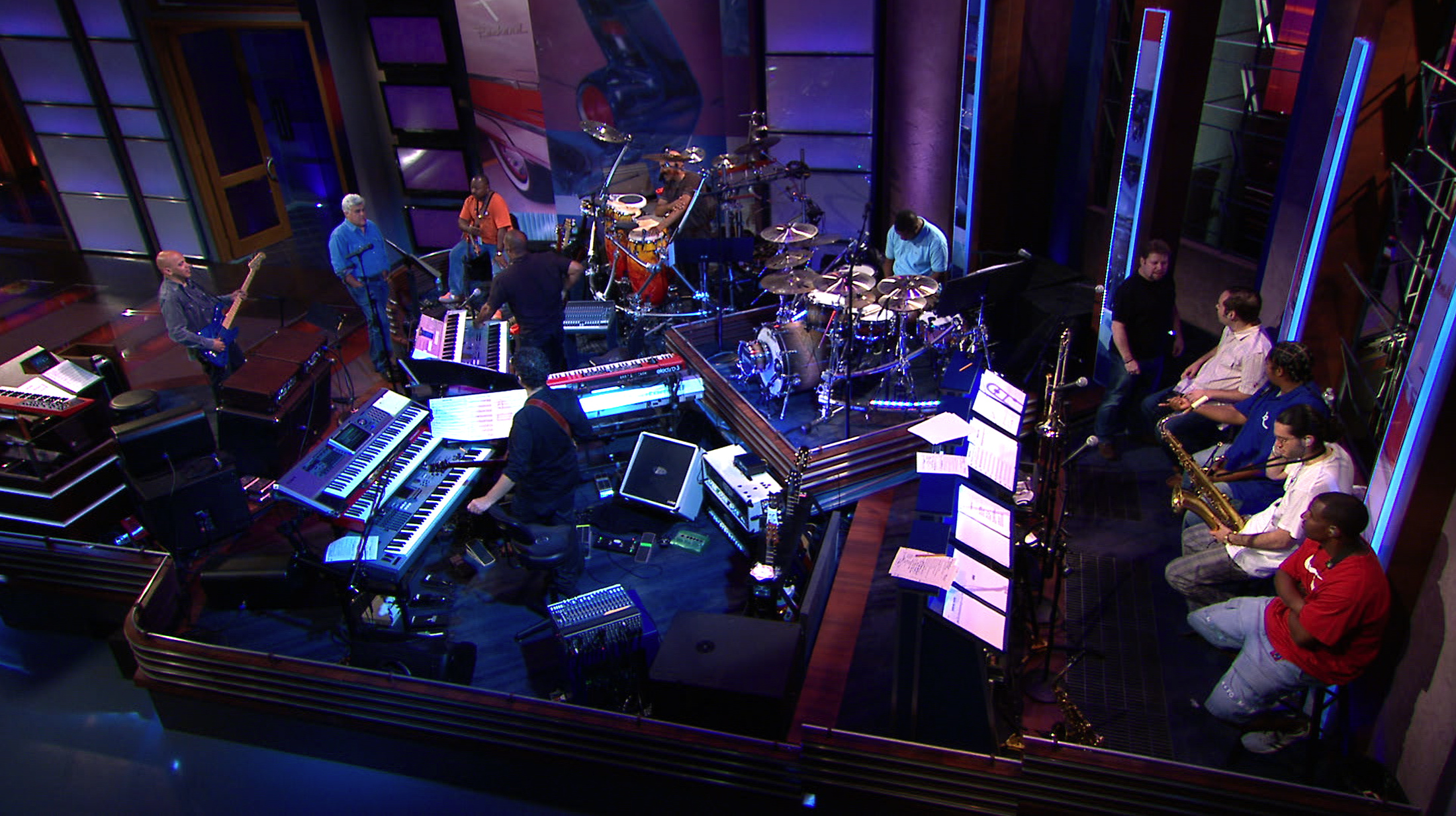
The band during rehearsal

Rickey Minor and The Tonight Show Band was the house band of The Tonight Show with Jay Leno from 2010 until 2014. Minor took over The Tonight Show Band after Kevin Eubanks and his band left the show in May 2010 after spending 18 years with Leno and disbanded when Leno's Tonight Show tenure ended in 2014.

== Members ==
- Leader/Bass: Rickey Minor
- Saxophone: Randolph Ellis, Miguel Gandelman
- Trumpet: Raymond Monteiro
- Trombone: Garrett Smith
- Keyboard: J. Wayne Linsey, David Delhomme
- Guitar: Paul Jackson, Jr.
- Drums: Teddy Campbell
- Percussion: Kevin Ricard
- Vocals: Dorian Holley
