= Aziza (album) =

Studio album by Dave Holland
- Released: October 14, 2016
- Recorded: September 7–8, 2015
- Studios: Sear Sound, New York City
- Genre: Jazz
- Length: 1:08:29
- Label: Dare2 Records
- Producer: Dave Holland

Dave Holland chronology
| The Art of Conversation (2014) | Aziza (2016) | Uncharted Territories (2018) |

Professional ratings
Review scores
| Source | Rating |
|---|---|
| All About Jazz | 4.5/5 stars |
| The Australian | 4.5/5 stars |
| The Buffalo News | 3/4 stars |
| The Guardian | 3/5 stars |
| The Irish Times | 4/5 stars |
| Jazzwise | 4/5 stars |
| PopMatters | 6/10 |
| The Sydney Morning Herald | 4/5 stars |
| Tom Hull | A− |
| Winnipeg Free Press | 4.5/5 stars |

Aziza is a studio album by English jazz bassist Dave Holland with saxophonist Chris Potter, guitarist Lionel Loueke and drummer Eric Harland. The album was released on October 14, 2016 via Holland's own Dare2 Records label.

== Background ==
Dave Holland explained that the name Aziza has come from one of their songs, “Aziza Dance,” written by Lionel Loueke. In Loueke's birthplace of Benin, Aziza means a supernatural race of forest dwellers giving practical and spiritual advice. The album features eight original compositions—two from each band member.

== Reception ==
Cormak Larkin of The Irish Times noted, "...there’s no doubting who is the elder statesman here, nor whose spirit is guiding proceedings. Dave Holland has been taking music in new and interesting directions since the late 1960s. And though each member of Aziza contributes a couple of tunes and brings their own unique character to the mix, most audible in this new group’s taut, funky, expansive sound are echoes of former Holland projects such as his Extensions quartet, and even the distant rumble of the great Gateway Trio". Peter Hum writing for Ottawa Citizen commented, "As much as I’ve liked the previous Holland-centred supergroups, the Aziza project stands out, thanks to Loueke’s special creativity, sonic breadth and his keenness to engage with everyone else in the band. Let’s hope this album isn’t simply a one-off." Will Layman of PopMatters stated, "In the balance between cliche and astonishment, Aziza overwhelmingly stays on the correct side of the law. Supergroup pitfalls are avoided, mostly, but fun is definitely had. You can imagine the band smiling as they left the studio. Indeed, these guys like playing together."

John McBeath of The Australian wrote, "This quartet is comprised of four stellar US musicians, all bandleaders, and each at the very top of their abilities, working beautifully together....These four names will probably be sufficient to invite a listening for jazz fans where the spectrum of emotion and diversity of approach is bound to secure interest." Ron Netsky in his review for City Newspaper wrote, "Aziza" is a world of discovery from start to finish." Jeff Simon of The Buffalo News wrote, "Here's a jazz all-star band to get almost anyone's attention -- and keep it for long periods too. Unfortunately, what that doesn't mean is that every selection on the record is worthy of the spectacular talent that went into it."

== Track listing ==
| No. | Title | Writer(s) | Length |
|---|---|---|---|
| 1. | "Aziza Dance" | Lionel Loueke | 9:14 |
| 2. | "Summer 15" | Chris Potter | 9:42 |
| 3. | "Walkin' the Walk" | Dave Holland | 8:38 |
| 4. | "Aquila" | Eric Harland | 6:55 |
| 5. | "Blue Sufi" | Chris Potter | 13:35 |
| 6. | "Finding the Light" | Dave Holland | 7:00 |
| 7. | "Friends" | Eric Harland | 6:07 |
| 8. | "Sleepless Nights" | Lionel Loueke | 7:21 |
| Total length: | | | 1:08:29 |

== Personnel ==
Band

- Chris Potter – tenor & soprano saxophone
- Lionel Loueke – guitar & vocals
- Dave Holland – bass, producer
- Eric Harland – drums

Production

- Louise Holland – executive producer
- James Farber – engineer
- Owen Mulholland – engineer
- Greg Calbi – mastering
- Scott Fallone – mastering
- Govert Driessen – photography
- Ulli Gruber – photography
- Susan Archie – art direction, design
- Rafael Gonzalez – artwork

== Charts ==
| Chart | Peak position (2016) |
|---|---|
| US Top Jazz Albums (Billboard) | 5 |
