= The Tonight Show with Jay Leno =

American talk show hosted by Jay Leno (1992–2009 & 2010–2014)

- Logo used from 2010–2014
- Also known as: The Tonight Show
- Genre: Late-night talk show; Variety show
- Starring: Jay Leno
- Announcer: Edd Hall; John Melendez; Wally Wingert
- Music by: Branford Marsalis and The Tonight Show Band (1992–1995); Kevin Eubanks and The Tonight Show Band (1995–2009, 2010); Rickey Minor and The Tonight Show Band (2010–2014)
- Country of origin: United States
- Original language: English
- No. of seasons: 22
- No. of episodes: 4,610 (list of episodes)

Production
- Producers: Helen Kushnick (1992); Debbie Vickers; Jay Leno
- Production locations: NBC Studios Burbank; Burbank, California
- Camera setup: Multi-camera
- Running time: 62 minutes
- Production companies: Big Dog Productions; Universal Television (Note: Credited as NBC Productions (1992–1996), NBC Studios (1996–2004), NBC Universal Television Studio (2004–2007) and Universal Media Studios (2007–2011).)

Original release
- Network: NBC
- Release: May 25, 1992 – May 29, 2009
- Release: March 1, 2010 – February 6, 2014

Related
- The Jay Leno Show; You Bet Your Life (2021 revival)

The Tonight Show with Jay Leno is an American television talk show broadcast by NBC. The show is the fourth and sixth installment of The Tonight Show. Hosted by Jay Leno, it aired from May 25, 1992, to May 29, 2009, replacing The Tonight Show Starring Johnny Carson and was replaced by The Tonight Show with Conan O'Brien. The show returned from March 1, 2010, to February 6, 2014, replacing The Tonight Show with Conan O'Brien and was replaced by The Tonight Show Starring Jimmy Fallon.

The fourth incarnation of the Tonight Show franchise debuted on May 25, 1992, three days after Johnny Carson's retirement as host of the program. The program originated from NBC Studios in Burbank, California, and was broadcast Monday through Friday at 11:35 p.m. in the Eastern and Pacific time zones (10:35 p.m. Central/Mountain time). Unlike Carson or his predecessor Jack Paar, Leno only once used a guest host, preferring to host the series in person.

The series, which followed the same basic format as that of its predecessors (an opening monologue followed by comedy routines, interviews and performances), ran until May 29, 2009, after which Leno was succeeded by Conan O'Brien. NBC signed Leno to a new deal for a nightly talk show in the 10:00 pm ET timeslot. The primetime series, titled The Jay Leno Show, debuted on September 14, 2009, following a similar format to the Leno incarnation of Tonight.

Neither O'Brien's version of the program, which premiered June 1, 2009, nor The Jay Leno Show generated the ratings NBC had expected. The network decided to move a condensed 30-minute version of Leno's show to O'Brien's time slot, and O'Brien's Tonight Show a half-hour later. This decision met with opposition from O'Brien, whose stint on The Tonight Show ended January 22, 2010, after which he began his own talk show, Conan, on TBS. The Tonight Show with Jay Leno then began its second incarnation, the sixth of the franchise, on March 1, 2010. Leno left The Tonight Show for good on February 6, 2014, and on February 17, was succeeded by Late Night host Jimmy Fallon, at which time the series returned to New York for the first time since 1972.

== History ==
=== Succession from Carson ===
Letterman on the feud with Leno in 2022

Leno on the feud with Letterman in 2023

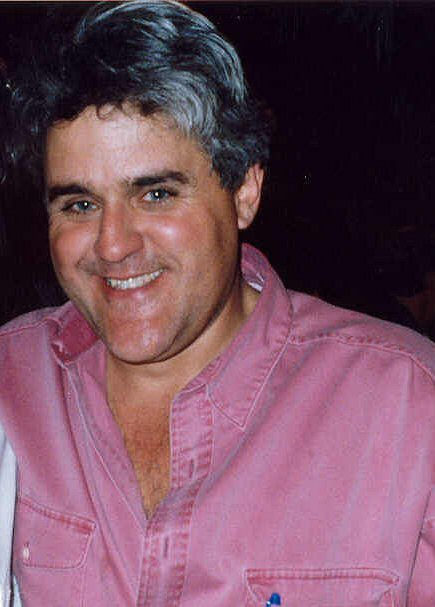
Jay Leno in 1993

Johnny Carson retired from The Tonight Show on May 22, 1992, and was replaced by Jay Leno. David Letterman wanted to move into the earlier time slot from his late night spot after The Tonight Show, and he was also considered by many as the natural successor (despite Leno having been Carson's permanent guest host for several years). Carson always favored Letterman; notably, Carson, who had been interviewed by Letterman, made two appearances on Letterman's rival CBS show, made no mention of Leno during his final shows and regularly sent Letterman monologue jokes in his final years. With his heart set on the earlier time slot, Letterman left NBC in June 1993 and joined CBS that August. The Late Show with David Letterman, airing in the same slot, competed against The Tonight Show for the remainder of Leno's run. Leno would outdo Letterman in ratings for the majority of the show's run. Conan O'Brien slid into the late night time slot vacated by Letterman in September 1993.

=== First end of Leno on Tonight ===
On September 27, 2004, the 50th anniversary of The Tonight Show's debut, NBC announced Leno would be succeeded by O'Brien, in 2009. Leno explained he did not want to see a repeat of the hard feelings and controversy that occurred when he was given the show over Letterman following Carson's retirement.

It was announced on July 21, 2008, that Leno would host his final episode of The Tonight Show on Friday, May 29, 2009, with O'Brien and James Taylor as his guests. O'Brien took over hosting duties commencing the following Monday, on June 1, 2009.

On December 9, 2008, it was announced Leno would be hosting a new nightly show in September 2009, which aired at 10 pm ET, during the network's prime time period. The Jay Leno Show ended after a short run on February 9, 2010.

=== Second incarnation ===
On January 7, 2010, multiple media outlets reported that effective March 1, 2010, The Jay Leno Show would move from the 10 pm (Eastern/Pacific Time) weeknight time slot to 11:35 pm and O'Brien's The Tonight Show with Conan O'Brien would move from 11:35 pm to 12:05 am. On January 12, 2010, O'Brien publicly announced in an open letter that he intended to leave NBC if they moved The Tonight Show to 12:05 am ET/PT to accommodate moving The Jay Leno Show to 11:35 pm Eastern/10:35 pm Central, due to poor ratings. After several days of negotiations, O'Brien reached a settlement with NBC that allowed him to leave NBC and The Tonight Show on January 22, 2010.

On January 21, 2010, NBC announced Leno would return to The Tonight Show. Jay Leno began his second tenure on March 1, 2010, after the 2010 Winter Olympics. The show moved to Stage 11 in Burbank, the former home of The Jay Leno Show, with a similar set and theme song of The Jay Leno Show. The Tonight Show bandleader Kevin Eubanks announced on April 12 he would be leaving The Tonight Show on May 28 after 18 years with Leno. Eubanks' replacement was former American Idol musical director Rickey Minor. Minor composed a new main theme when he took over.

On July 1, 2010, Variety reported that only six months into its second life, Leno's Tonight Show posted its lowest ratings since 1992. By September 2010, Leno's ratings in the adults 18–49 demographic had fallen below those of O'Brien when he had hosted The Tonight Show. NBC ratings specialist Tom Bierbaum commented that due to the host being out of late night television for a period of time and the subsequent 2010 Tonight Show conflict, Leno's ratings fall was "not a surprise at all". In October 2010, David Letterman beat Leno's program in the ratings, for the first time since Leno returned to hosting The Tonight Show. By May 2011, Leno's Tonight Show regained the lead and held it since then. However, by August 2012, the Los Angeles Times was reporting that The Tonight Show was in serious trouble for a number of reasons, most notably that NBC was losing money. While Leno offered to take a pay cut, at least 24 members of his staff were laid off. By March 2013, there were rumors that NBC would have Jimmy Fallon, who had been hosting Late Night since 2009 when he succeeded O'Brien, become the next host of The Tonight Show when Leno's current contract ended in 2014 and NBC would move the show back to New York for the first time in over 40 years. On May 13, 2013, during its fall "upfronts" presentation, NBC confirmed Fallon would take over as host of the Tonight Show beginning on February 17, 2014; Seth Meyers, in turn, would leave Saturday Night Live (where he was the anchor of Weekend Update) and take over Fallon's time slot.

Leno's final episode of The Tonight Show aired on February 6, 2014. Per the terms on his deal with NBC, his staff was paid through September 2014. Leno wrapped up the night before the 2014 Sochi Winter Olympics, which began on February 7. Fallon took over The Tonight Show on February 17. Leno himself would later appear multiple times on Jimmy Fallon's version of The Tonight Show, such as a June 15, 2016, appearance in which Leno not only appeared as a guest, he delivered part of that night's monologue, commenting on the 2016 US election campaign. (Leno came out to do the monologue after Fallon faked an injury.)

== Production ==
From 1992 to 2009, the show was taped at NBC Studios' (now The Burbank Studios) Studio 1 and 3, and from the final episodes of its initial run in 2009, and again its revival from 2010 to 2014 in Studio 11.

On April 26, 1999, the show began broadcasting in digital HDTV 1080i, becoming the first American nightly talk show to be shot in high definition. The show was recorded in two channel stereo sound and shot with ten Sony HD cameras including four Sony HDC-700A, three Sony HDC-750A, and three Sony DXC-H10 point of view cameras in 16:9 aspect ratio in the year 2000. The show was directly fed to network affiliates through SBS-4 satellite and NTSC feed was sent to New York via AT&T fiber and was uplinked by New York to its affiliates.

=== Finances ===
During the last year with Leno as host, The Tonight Show cost about $1.7 million a week to produce. With 45 weeks of annual production, that amounted to about $76.5 million, excluding the salaries for Leno and the show's "top producers".

In that same period, the show had been generating an estimated $30–40 million a year in profit, down from the $150 million a year the franchise once made."

=== Format ===
The show follows an established six-piece format. After announcer Wally Wingert introduces the opening credits, Leno delivers a ten-minute monologue featuring jokes about current events, occasionally interspersed with brief comedy sketches. The second segment features a longer comedy sketch, such as a mini-documentary presented by a "Tonight Show correspondent" (e.g., Ross the Intern or Mikey Day), or one of Leno's signature segments, such as Headlines.

The first guest appears, with the interview is divided into two segments, then followed by an interview with the second guest in the fifth segment. The sixth and final segment is typically a performance by a musical guest or stand-up comedian.

Immediately following the last performance segment, Leno walks on camera to thank the performers, bid farewell to the audience and recommends watching Late Night which immediately follows The Tonight Show. As the closing credits roll on-screen, the closing theme, composed by bandleader Rickey Minor plays the show off the air.

=== Bandleader ===
Branford Marsalis was the original bandleader of the show from 1992 to 1995, leaving the show after feeling displeased with his role on the show, what he called being an "ass-kisser". Kevin Eubanks, who was the guitarist in Marsalis' band, moved up to bandleader forming Kevin Eubanks and The Tonight Show Band and remained with The Tonight Show and The Jay Leno Show until 2010, when he left to concentrate on music, adding that his leaving was not provoked by any problems with Leno or NBC. Eubanks would later reunite with Leno as co-host of Leno's version of You Bet Your Life.

Rickey Minor, former American Idol music director, replaced Eubanks, forming Rickey Minor and The Tonight Show Band, staying until the end of Leno's tenure.

=== Announcer ===
Edd Hall served as announcer on The Tonight Show from 1992 until 2004. Hall occasionally appeared in skits during the opening monologue. These skits often involved slapstick injury to Hall (by using a stunt double, dummy, or film clip), such as vehicles running him over in the studio parking lot. Unlike his predecessors on Tonight (i.e. McMahon with Carson, Hugh Downs with Jack Paar), Hall did not serve as a sidekick for Leno during his tenure on Leno's incarnation of The Tonight Show.

Hall was controversially replaced in 2004 by The Howard Stern Show staff member John Melendez in what many perceived as a thinly veiled attempt to attract a younger demographic and nonsensical considering his "stuttering" moniker. The hiring of Melendez which was carried out by Leno without Stern's knowledge, prompted a rift between Stern and Leno. Stern launched into tirades on his show for many weeks on saying Leno was "ripping him off", citing previously "lifted" material from his show such as "Jaywalking" ripping off Stern's "homeless game"; for example, stating "To an 18- to 25-year-old male, Jay Leno is gay. He might as well put a dress on." Since the move to The Jay Leno Show, Melendez was replaced as announcer, but remained on the writing staff. Wally Wingert would be the only off-camera announcer for Leno's second Tonight tenure, carrying over his duties from The Jay Leno Show.

== Notable episodes ==
- On May 25, 1992, The Tonight Show with Jay Leno debuted on NBC. Jay's guests on his first show as permanent host were Billy Crystal, Shanice, and Robert Krulwich.
- On May 20, 1993, The Tonight Show with Jay Leno traveled to the Bull & Finch Pub in Boston, Massachusetts, to celebrate the final episode of Cheers. This is the first time that The Tonight Show with Jay Leno is taped on the road.
- On May 9, 1994, Bobcat Goldthwait appeared on The Tonight Show with Jay Leno, where he set the guest chair on fire. Leno throws a cup of coffee, and tells Bobcat to sit down.
- On August 22, 1994, Leno eulogized his father, who had recently died. After his monologue, Leno sat behind his desk and told the audience about his father's life and how his father had supported him in his career. Leno noted a moment when, upon Carson's disapproval at Leno being his successor, his father had encouraged him and told him to "fight the good fight". Leno ended the tribute saying, "You know, it really is lonely at the top. You have no idea. But... we'll fight the good fight, Pop."
- On July 10, 1995, Hugh Grant appeared in public for the first time after his arrest on lewd conduct charges the previous month. Leno famously asked him "What the hell were you thinking?" In response, Grant told Leno, "I think you know in life what's a good thing to do and what's a bad thing, and I did a bad thing...and there you have it." The appearance was the first episode in which Leno beat CBS rival David Letterman.
- On November 30, 1995, Howard Stern, who had made two highly rated appearances in 1992 and 1993, appeared with bikini-clad porn stars Nikki Tyler and Janine Lindemulder, attempting to show "the Tonight Show's first lesbian kiss" and encouraging Leno to spank one of them. Stern and the women remained during Siskel and Ebert's segment, where he began to suck one of their toes, to raucous applause and behavior from the crowd. Leno was visibly uncomfortable during both segments, repeatedly telling Stern "it will all be edited out", and hastily trying to interview Siskel & Ebert while the crowd went wild at Stern's antics. Leno ended the show early by walking off the air, which was edited out when it aired a few hours later, as revealed by Stern when he went on the air (on The Howard Stern Show) the following morning. Despite the situation, Leno called into the show that morning claiming Stern had "gone beyond the acceptable standards". Stern said Leno should not have "been so uptight" and he had a "real" reaction to the situation which was great. Stern recounted Leno had yelled at his producer Gary Dell'Abate saying Stern had "'s-d' in his house" and supposedly "grabbed his crotch" and yelled "Pussy, Pussy, Pussy! That's all it is with Howard" which Leno denied but agreed he had been angered by Stern.
- On March 13, 2000, New York Giants cornerback Jason Sehorn came onstage during Leno's interview with his girlfriend, Law & Order star Angie Harmon, surprising her by proposing in front of Jay, the audience, and musical guest Elton John. Harmon tearfully said yes, and Elton performed after the break. One night later in the monologue, Leno cracked up the audience by saying the episode was like every date he had in college: "The pretty girl ran off with the football player, and I was left alone listening to Elton John!"
- In September 2000, with California in an energy crisis that forced blackouts, Leno did an episode in the dark using only candles and flashlights known as "The Tonight Show Unplugged".
- Following the September 11 attacks, The Tonight Show was off the air for about a week, as were most similar programs. The first post-9/11 episode began with a still image of an American flag and a subdued opening without the usual opening credits. Leno's monologue paid tribute to those who lost their lives and to firefighters, police and rescue workers across the US. Leno had questioned whether a show that regularly poked fun at the government could continue after the attacks, but in his monologue he explained that he also saw the show as a respite from the grim news of the world, akin to a cookie or glass of lemonade handed to a firefighter. He also told a story about himself as a 12-year-old Boy Scout, which Leno said he was not a very good at because of his dyslexia. His scoutmaster gave him the task of being the "cheermaster" of the troop, in which Leno told jokes to the troop to keep their spirits up. Senator John McCain and the musical group Crosby, Stills, and Nash were featured guests. Leno also organized an auction for a Harley-Davidson motorcycle signed by celebrities (he signed his name on-stage), with the proceeds going to 9/11 support organizations. For an extended period after the attack, a short clip of a large American flag waving was shown in between the announcement of the musical guest and Leno's introduction during the opening montage.
- On May 12, 2003, Katie Couric hosted The Tonight Show for a day. Couric's guests on that night's show were Mike Myers, Simon Cowell, and Robbie Williams.
- On August 6, 2003, actor Arnold Schwarzenegger appeared on The Tonight Show and confirmed he would be running against California governor Gray Davis for the 2003 California gubernatorial recall election. Schwarzenegger won the election on October 7.
- On January 24, 2005, Leno had a special episode that paid tribute to Tonight Show predecessor Johnny Carson, who had died the day before. During the opening credits, the guests of that show were simply announced using pictures from when they were on Carson's Tonight Show, and the monologue simply gave condolence to Carson. There were no segments used; however, Leno played clips from The Tonight Show Starring Johnny Carson before commercials. All the guests were people who had worked with Carson, and had been on his show, including Ed McMahon, Drew Carey, Don Rickles, and Bob Newhart.
- On July 20, 2006, as Colin Farrell was being interviewed by Leno, Farrell's stalker, Dessarae Bradford, evaded security, walked on stage as cameras were rolling, confronted Farrell, and threw her book on Leno's desk. In front of a silent, stunned audience, Farrell escorted her off the stage himself, told the camera crew to stop filming, and handed her over to security. As Bradford was led out of the studio, she shouted "I'll see you in court!" Farrell's response was simply, "Darling, you're insane!" Outside the studio, NBC security handed her to Burbank police, who eventually released her. While waiting to begin filming again, a shocked Leno sarcastically called for "a round of applause for NBC security" from the audience. After Farrell apologized to the audience, describing Bradford as "my first stalker", the show then continued filming and the incident was edited out of the broadcast aired that night. Farrell later requested a restraining order in court against Bradford.
- On July 24, 2007, the monologue was animated by Homer Simpson. Simpson gave a short monologue to the audience, and was "kicked out" by Leno. This sketch was to promote The Simpsons Movie.
- On January 2, 2008, The Tonight Show (along with Jimmy Kimmel Live! and Late Night with Conan O'Brien) returned to air without writers, with the WGA still on strike. This was in response to the deal by David Letterman's production company Worldwide Pants and CBS Paramount Television with the WGA to allow Late Show with David Letterman and The Late Late Show with Craig Ferguson to return with writers. Leno's guest that night, Republican presidential candidate Mike Huckabee, was criticized for crossing the WGA picket line to appear on the show. Huckabee would go on to win the Iowa caucuses the very next day.
- On June 13, 2008, Leno delivered the news of Tim Russert's death to his audience during his monologue, and set aside some time in it to remember his old colleague. Leno then stated that he would continue the show as normal afterwards.
- On March 19, 2009, Barack Obama appeared on the show. This marked the first time that a sitting President of the United States appeared on a late night talk show. President Obama came under fire for a remark made about the Special Olympics, which he made in reference to Leno's congratulations to Obama's low bowling score.
- On March 1, 2010, Leno made his return to The Tonight Show with a re-written version of The Jay Leno Show theme song and a renovated Stage 11. Leno's guests were Jamie Foxx, Olympic Gold medalist Lindsey Vonn, and musical guest Brad Paisley. Leno also did a segment searching for a new desk, an element which was not implemented into his primetime show.
- On November 18, 2010, former president George W. Bush made his first appearance on a late night talk show since leaving office.
- On November 23, 2010, former bandleader Kevin Eubanks returned to promote his new album Zen Food.
- On March 2, 2011, the 4,000th episode aired.
- On February 6, 2014, Leno hosted his final show, which featured several pre-taped well-wishes (and humorous advice) from a variety of celebrities ranging from Steve Carell to President Barack Obama, who offered Leno an ambassadorship to Antarctica ("Hope you have a warm coat, funnyman."). Appearing as Leno's final guests were Billy Crystal (Leno's first guest in 1992) and Garth Brooks. Crystal surprised Leno by leading an on-stage sing-along of "So Long, Farewell" from The Sound of Music, with lyrics for the occasion performed by special guests Jack Black, Kim Kardashian, Chris Paul, Sheryl Crow, Jim Parsons, Carol Burnett, and Oprah Winfrey; Brooks performed his touching song "The Dance" (at Leno's request) before closing out the show with the rousing "Friends in Low Places". In closing "the greatest 22 years of my life", Leno turned emotional in his final remarks, calling himself "the luckiest guy in the world... I got to meet presidents, astronauts, and movie stars." Leno also thanked the audience as well as his staff, who "became my family" after the deaths of his parents and his brother early in his Tonight tenure.

== Reception ==
Critical reviews for the show were mixed, with a Metacritic score of 49 out of 100, based on 9 reviews. In a negative review, Robert Bianco of USA Today wrote; "Monday's opening monologue, supposedly Leno's strong suit, was tired, lame and unfunny. In other words, typical of the real Leno, rather than the Leno of public-relations imagination."

The show was nominated for an Emmy Award in the Outstanding Variety, Music or Comedy Series category ten times between 1993 and 2005. It won the award in 1995.

== Ratings ==
The 10th Anniversary special, broadcast on April 30, 2002, drew in 11.888 million viewers.

On September 22, 2006, The Tonight Show led in ratings for the 11th consecutive season, with a nightly average of 5.7 million viewers – 31% of the total audience in that time slot – compared to 4.2 million viewers for Late Show with David Letterman, 3.4 million for Nightline and 1.6 million for Jimmy Kimmel Live!. Two events helped Leno gain and keep the lead: a new set brought Leno closer to the audience and Hugh Grant kept his July 10, 1995 scheduled appearance, despite having been arrested for seeing a prostitute, where Leno famously asked Grant, "What the hell were you thinking?" The final telecast of the first incarnation of The Tonight Show with Jay Leno had the show's highest overnight household rating for a Friday episode in the comedian's 17-year run as host of Tonight, averaging an 8.8 rating in metered-market households.

For at least six weeks following his return to The Tonight Show, Leno's program beat Letterman in the overall ratings each night, though with a reduced lead in comparison to his first tenure. By mid-2010, The Tonight Show was receiving its lowest ratings since 1992, an average of 4 million total viewers, though he remained ahead of Letterman, who experienced a coinciding decline in ratings. In September 2010, The Tonight Show posted its lowest numbers on record, with Leno averaging 3.8 million viewers. This was a 12% increase in total viewers over O'Brien at the same time the previous year, but still 23% below O'Brien in the coveted 18–49 demographic. For the first time in almost 15 years, the show slipped to second place in its time slot being consistently beaten by Nightline. In October 2010, Letterman beat Leno's program in the ratings, for the first time since Leno returned to hosting The Tonight Show.

In the May 2011 sweeps period, all of NBCs late night programming had increased viewership. The Tonight Show received a 15% increase in viewership compared with the first 36 weeks of last season. In that process, it outlasted rival late night talk shows Jimmy Kimmel Live! on ABC, as well as Late Show with David Letterman on CBS. Both of Leno's lead-in, Late Night with Jimmy Fallon and Last Call with Carson Daly, also received increased viewership. For the season, in the 18–49 demographic, The Tonight Show had 4 million viewers, compared with Late Show, which had 3.5 million, and Jimmy Kimmel Live!, which had only 1.9 million. Nightline, though, still beat Leno in the May 2011 sweeps, with 4.4 million viewers.

Series high

Views	Description	Date	Reference
22.4 million	Cheers finale	May 20, 1993	
16.1 million	Debut	May 25, 1992	
15.0 million	Seinfeld finale	May 14, 1998	
14.6 million	Series finale	February 6, 2014	
11.9 million	First series finale	May 29, 2009	

Weekly highs

Views	Description	Date	Reference
9.1 million		May 17, 1993	
8.3 million	Finale week	February 3–6, 2014	

== Broadcasting in other countries ==
=== Australia ===
The show was telecast in Australia by The Comedy Channel before being discontinued in July 2010, shortly after Leno's reinstatement as the host of The Tonight Show. The channel had been airing versions by the various presenters under the title Late Night Legends. Currently, The Tonight Show is one of the few late-night television shows that cannot be viewed on Australian television. The only shows available are Late Show with David Letterman on Network 10, Late Night with Jimmy Fallon on The Comedy Channel, The Late Late Show with Craig Ferguson on 10 Peach Comedy and Conan on 9Gem.

=== Brazil ===
From 1991 to 2000, the cable channel Superstation showed both The Tonight Show and Late Show in daily bases, one week after airing in the United States. From 2011, the show was broadcast on Record News with Brazilian Portuguese subtitles at midnight (local time), two days after airing in United States.

=== Canada ===
Canadian viewers watched the show on CTV 2 and on NBC affiliates close to the U.S./Canada border.

=== CNBC Asia ===
For many years, The Tonight Show episodes from the week ran back-to-back on Saturday and Sunday on CNBC Asia, available to Brunei, China, Hong Kong, Indonesia, Malaysia, Singapore and Thailand – but since October 2011, they have been replaced by Late Night with Jimmy Fallon.

=== CNBC Europe ===
CNBC Europe confirmed they would show The Tonight Show when Conan O'Brien took over from Jay Leno in June 2009. After Leno returned, they have been showing The Tonight Show with Jay Leno. From Monday April 19, 2010, until the show's conclusion under Leno, CNBC Europe aired the show on weeknights from 12.00 am CET in a one-hour format, with double bill re-runs on Saturdays/Sundays from 9:00 pm–9:45 pm & 9:45 pm–10:30 pm CET. The show aired on a one-day delay from original transmission in the US.

=== Finland ===
In Finland, The Tonight Show with Jay Leno was broadcast by MTV3 MAX from Monday to Friday with a three-night delay.

=== India ===
The show was originally broadcast on CNBC. Starting in 2006 it was telecast on Zee Café at local time 10:00 pm with a one-night delay. It was later shifted to Zee Trends in 2011, which was subsequently discontinued after a short run. Now The Tonight Show Starring Jimmy Fallon is telecast on Comedy Central at 11:00 pm every weekdays.

=== Israel ===
In Israel the show was aired during the 1990s on NBC Europe, which was included in Israeli cable (later called the "Hot" company), though this channel was pulled from cable in Israel towards the end of the 1990s. Soon after, the show began airing on the Israeli popular cable channel Hot 3 (then simply called "Channel 3") until 1999. Since 2000, the show is broadcast in the Israeli satellite company yes (which launched in that year) in various channels, the current being yes stars comedy.

=== Italy ===
In Italy (with Italian subtitles) from 2003 to 2007 when RaiSat Extra cancelled the program.

=== Philippines ===
In the Philippines, channel ETC (now SolarFlix) broadcast The Tonight Show from August 2004 to December 2007, when the show was turned over to sister channel Jack TV (now RPTV) and Talk TV (now RPTV).

=== Portugal ===
In Portugal, the show was first shown on SIC Comédia until the channel was off the air by the end of 2006. The show was switched to SIC Mulher until Leno moved to prime-time. SIC Radical used to broadcast The Tonight Show with Conan O'Brien following the demand from their target audience to O'Brien's humor, after Jimmy Fallon took over Late Night. The contract that both NBC and SIC had was not expired by the time The Tonight Show with Conan O'Brien got cancelled, so the network received the rights to exhibit The Tonight Show with Jay Leno.

=== Sweden ===
In Sweden, Kanal 5 started airing The Tonight Show every night Monday to Friday with a one-week delay in 2000. In 2008, Kanal 5 chose to replace it with Jimmy Kimmel Live!, and moved The Tonight Show to their sister channel Kanal 9, with a rerun aired the next day on Kanal 5.

=== Turkey ===
The Tonight Show with Jay Leno was broadcast by CNBC-e and e2 on weekdays at 00:00 with a one-night delay.
