= Not for Nothin' =

Studio album by the Dave Holland Quintet
- Released: 21 August 2001
- Recorded: 21–23 September 2000
- Studio: Avatar, New York City
- Genre: Post-bop
- Length: 1:12:53
- Label: ECM; ECM 1758
- Producer: Dave Holland

The Dave Holland Quintet chronology
Prime Directive (1999)	Not for Nothin' (2001)	What Goes Around (2002)

Dave Holland Quintet chronology
Prime Directive (1999)	Not for Nothin' (2001)	Extended Play: Live at Birdland (2003)

Not for Nothin' is the third studio album by the Dave Holland Quintet, recorded over three days in September 2000 and released on ECM August the following year—Holland's thirteenth release for the label. The quintet features saxophonist Chris Potter, trombonist Robin Eubanks, vibraphonist Steve Nelson and drummer Billy Kilson, their third album together as a quintet.

== Reception ==
Professional ratings
Review scores
Source	Rating
Allmusic	4.5/5 stars
The Penguin Guide to Jazz Recordings	3.5/4 stars

The AllMusic review by Thom Jurek awarded the album 4.5 stars, stating, "This is postmodern poetic singing at its finest. Who said jazz is a dead art form? Let he or she who has the ears to hear, hear; the Dave Holland Quintet is carrying the banner of creative music in the jazz tradition in the 21st century." Maurice Bottomley of PopMatters wrote:

"Actually, the ECM connection matters. If, like me, you associate the label with all that is clever but too contemplative by half, Not for Nothin' should be a salutary warning to your (and my) prejudices. Make no mistake, it swings, struts and sways in all the right places. And, at every twist and turn, the formidable Holland is there, relentlessly driving the music forward. There is nothing here that will surprise anyone who has heard Prime Directive—this set's predecessor—but it is, if anything, more easily confident. The younger players are all improving and their leader is certainly not in decline. As for the material, there have been more distinctive compositions, but everything is handled so well that it hardly matters. Best Jazz Album 2001?—no, but pretty close. Best Small Group 2001? I don't see why not."

== Track listing ==
All tracks are written by Dave Holland, except as noted.

No.	Title	Writer(s)	Length
1.	"Global Citizen"	Robin Eubanks	11:12
2.	"For All You Are"		8:19
3.	"Lost and Found"	Chris Potter	9:27
4.	"Shifting Sands"		5:20
5.	"Billows of Rhythm"	Billy Kilson	6:45
6.	"What Goes Around"		13:04
7.	"Go Fly a Kite"	Steve Nelson	6:12
8.	"Not for Nothin'"		5:54
9.	"Cosmosis"		6:11

=== Note ===
- "What Goes Around" was re-recorded by Holland in a big-band arrangement on the follow-up album What Goes Around.

== Personnel ==
=== Dave Holland Quintet ===
- Robin Eubanks – trombone and cowbell
- Chris Potter – soprano, alto and tenor saxophones
- Steve Nelson – vibraphone & marimba
- Dave Holland – bass
- Billy Kilson – drums

=== Technical personnel ===
- Dave Holland – producer, liner notes
- Manfred Eicher – executive producer
- James Farber – engineer
- Aya Takemura – assistant engineer
- Max Franosch – cover design
- Nicola Dell'Olio – photography
- Louise Holland – project coordinator
