= Another Land =

Studio album by Dave Holland
- Released: 21 May 2021
- Recorded: 10–11 September 2019
- Studio: Sear Sound, New York City
- Genre: Jazz
- Length: 67:35
- Label: Edition
- Producer: Dave Holland

Dave Holland chronology
| Without Deception (2020) | Another Land (2021) | United (2024) |

Professional ratings
Review scores
| Source | Rating |
|---|---|
| All About Jazz | 4/5 stars |
| AllMusic | 4/5 stars |
| DownBeat | 3.5/5 stars |
| Financial Times | 4/5 stars |
| Jazzwise | 4/5 stars |
| PopMatters | 8/10 |
| Tom Hull | B+ |

Another Land is a studio album by English jazz bassist Dave Holland together with guitarist Kevin Eubanks and drummer Obed Calvaire. The album was released on 21 May 2021 by Edition Records.

== Background ==
The album was recorded in the pre-pandemic New York City of 2019, and consists of nine original instrumentals—four by Holland, four by Eubanks, and one by Calvaire. Holland plays both a bass guitar ("Grave Walker", "Bring It Back Home") and a double bass ("Another Land"). Even though this is a studio album, the compositions are actually borrowed from the various themes organically developed during the trio's concerts before recording. Holland explained, "We were doing a continuous set, once we started we very rarely stopped, we just kept going."

== Reception ==
Jeff Tamarkin writing for JazzTimes stated, "This music is not devoid of raw power, but it’s also got plenty of grace and delicacy; there’s a casual tone to it all, as though the three went into it sans expectations and this is simply what emerged when they hit the record button... Besides, Holland has plenty of other opportunities to be the chief pathfinder. " Alyn Shipton of Jazzwise commented, "Another Land repays repeated listening, in that its apparently simple constituent parts, honed by pre-lockdown touring, add up to something exceptional, with new details always waiting to be discovered." Will Layman of PopMatters mentioned, " Another Land grabs your lapels and won’t let you forget that Eubanks has a wide and total command of his voice and that Holland’s music still sounds fresh after 50 years—with a younger drummer who is beautiful in the conversation. It is a pleasure and a dare to tune in."

Martin Johnson of The Wall Street Journal wrote, "Dave Holland is one of jazz’s leading bassists, and he has made dozens of superb recordings; most of them, usually in quartet, quintet or big band settings, present exuberant and vivacious music. On his new album... he showcases a more intimate approach. His previous ensembles were often among the elite, and for good reason—they combined an old-school approach to structure (a rhythm section with big interlocking pieces) with of-the-moment solos propelled by a sense of harmonic freedom. “Another Land” features a trio and puts these values to work in a more discreet way." Mike Hobart of Financial Times said that "Holland remains rock solid, even when supporting the guitarist’s twiddles note-perfectly underneath."

== Track listing ==
All tracks are written by Dave Holland except as noted.

| No. | Title | Writer(s) | Length |
|---|---|---|---|
| 1. | "Grave Walker" | Kevin Eubanks | 6:56 |
| 2. | "Another Land" | | 9:16 |
| 3. | "Gentle Warrior" | Obed Calvaire | 8:42 |
| 4. | "20 20" | Eubanks | 8:20 |
| 5. | "Quiet Fire" | | 4:39 |
| 6. | "Mashup" | Eubanks | 6:33 |
| 7. | "Passing Time" | | 8:08 |
| 8. | "The Village" | Eubanks | 8:47 |
| 9. | "Bring It Back Home" | | 5:59 |
| Total length: | | | 67:35 |

== Personnel ==
- Dave Holland – bass, bass guitar
- Obed Calvaire – drums
- Kevin Eubanks – guitar
