= Different Perspectives =

Studio album by Robin Eubanks
- Released: 1989
- Recorded: June 1988
- Genre: Jazz
- Length: 53:24
- Labels: JMT; JMT 834 424
- Producer: Stefan F. Winter

Robin Eubanks chronology
Different Perspectives (1989)	Dedication (1989)

Different Perspectives is the debut album by trombonist Robin Eubanks which was recorded in 1988 and released on the JMT label.

== Reception ==
The AllMusic review by Michael G. Nastos said it was "An exceptional first album from this trombonist. A great listening album with many components, mostly in a progressive vein".

Professional ratings
Review scores
Source	Rating
AllMusic	4.5/5 stars
The Penguin Guide to Jazz Recordings	3.5/4 stars

== Track listing ==
All compositions by Robin Eubanks except as indicated

1. "Midtown" - 6:29
2. "The Night Before" - 5:01
3. "Taicho" - 7:20
4. "You Don't Know What Love Is" (Don Raye, Gene de Paul) - 9:03
5. "Overjoyed" (Stevie Wonder) - 5:02
6. "Walkin'" (Richard Carpenter) - 7:19
7. "Different Perspectives" – 12:53

== Personnel ==
- Robin Eubanks - trombone
- Kevin Eubanks - guitar
- James Weidman - keyboards
- Rael Wesley Grant - electric bass
- Peter Washington - bass
- Terri Lyne Carrington, Jeff "Tain" Watts - drums
- Steve Coleman - saxophones
- Michael Mossman - trumpet
- Slide Hampton, Clifton Anderson, Douglas Purviance - trombone
