= Duane Eubanks =

American trumpeter (born 1969)

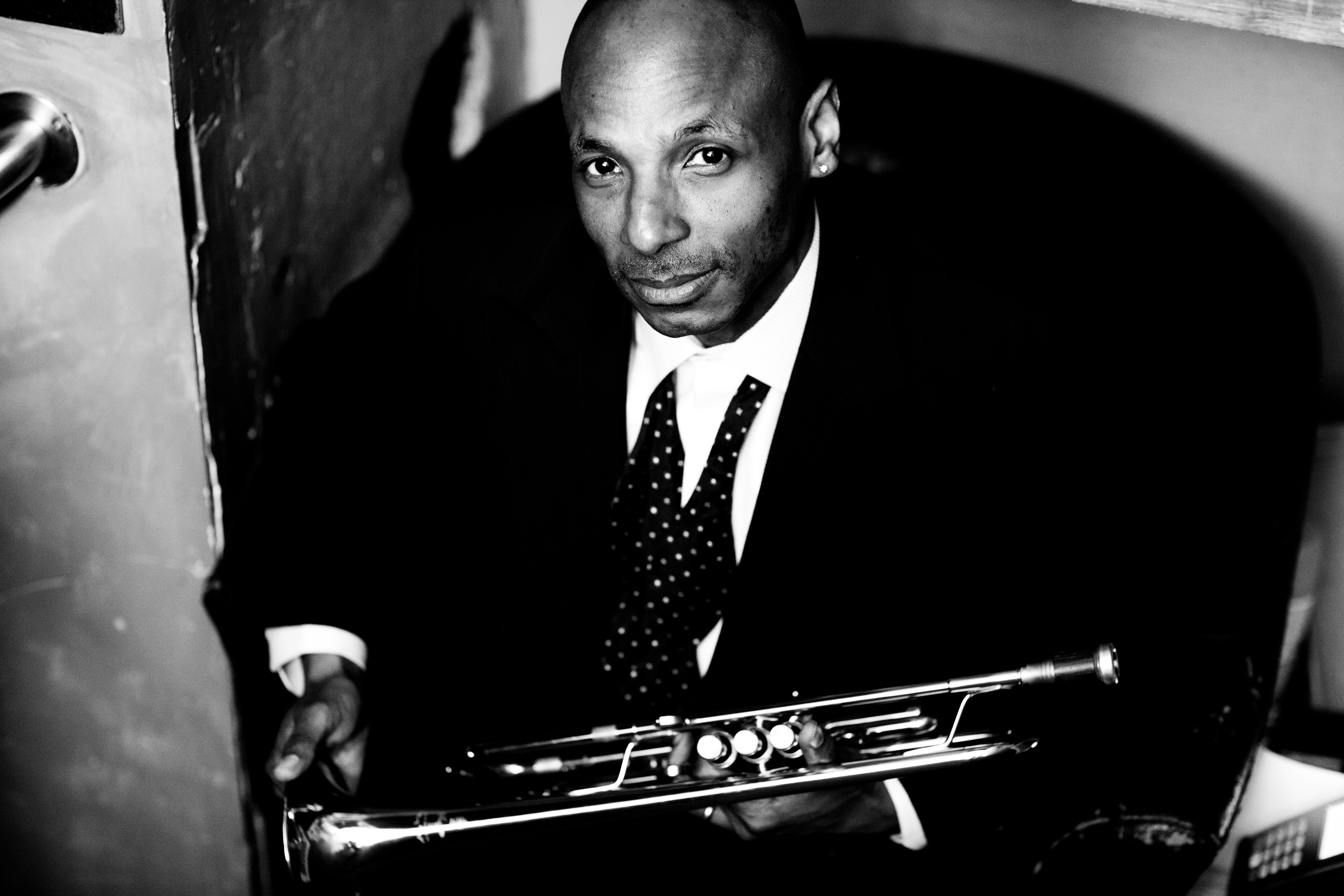
Duane Eubanks at Smalls Jazz Club NYC, May 2014

Duane Eubanks (born January 24, 1969, in Philadelphia) is an American jazz trumpeter and flugelhornist, known for his participation in Dave Holland's big band. He is the younger brother of Kevin Eubanks and Robin Eubanks. He also has a twin, Shane Eubanks.

== History ==
Eubanks was raised in a musical family, but stopped playing in his teens and instead pursued a degree in accounting; six years later, he conceded that this had been an error, and returned to music. He subsequently studied jazz at Temple University, where he played with Wynton Marsalis and Billy Taylor, and also spent two years training with Johnny Coles.

Eubanks released his first album, My Shining Hour, in 1999, having been approached by a producer who had heard him performing on his brother Robin's album 4: JJ / Slide / Curtis and Al.

== Collaborations ==
Eubanks has also performed with many other musicians and musical groups, including Defunkt, Rhonda Ross, Oliver Lake, Mulgrew Miller, and the Wu-Tang Clan.

Since 1998, he has been on the faculty of the Brooklyn Conservatory of Music.

== Awards and honors ==
In 2002 and 2005, Eubanks shared in the Grammy Awards received by Dave Holland's big band for the albums What Goes Around and Overtime.

In 2013, Eubanks received an Eddy Award from the Philadelphia Education Fund for his services to music education.

== Discography ==
As Leader

- My Shining Hour (1999)
- Second Take (2001)
- Things of That Particular Nature (2015)

As Co-Leader

- "DE3: Live at Maxwell's (2016)
