= Steve Nelson (vibraphonist) =

American jazz vibraphone and marimba player (born 1954)

- Born: August 11, 1954 (age 72); Pittsburgh, Pennsylvania, U.S.
- Genre: Jazz
- Occupation: Musician
- Instruments: Vibraphone, marimba
- Labels: Red, HighNote, Sunnyside, Criss Cross

Steve Nelson (born August 11, 1954) is an American jazz vibraphonist and marimba player. In addition to his solo work, Nelson is known for collaborating since the 1990s with bassist Dave Holland's Quintet and Big Band.

Nelson graduated from Rutgers University with both bachelor's and master's degrees in music, and his teaching activities have included positions at Princeton University, Montclair State University, and William Paterson University. He has appeared at concerts and festivals worldwide and has made recordings as the leader of his own group. He has performed and recorded with Kenny Barron, Bobby Watson, Mulgrew Miller, David "Fathead" Newman, Johnny Griffin, and Jackie McLean.

In 2023, he appeared in Nathan Siegelaub and Ania Gruszczyńska's short documentary film Sparni, which was produced for the Columbia University Graduate School of Journalism and followed one of his students from Montclair, young aspiring vibraphonist Pierce "Sparni" Sparnroft. Some scenes in the film depict Nelson instructing Sparni while on campus.

== Discography ==
=== As leader ===
- Full Nelson (Sunnyside, 1990)
- Communications (Criss Cross, 1990)
- Fuller Nelson (Sunnyside, 2004)
- Sound-Effect (HighNote, 2007)
- Stratocluster with Bruno Vansina (W.E.R.F., 2012)
- Brothers Under the Sun (HighNote, 2017)
- Vibraphone Jazz Dreams, volumes 1 and 2 (2018)
- A Common Language (Daybreak, 2024)

=== As sideman ===
With Dave Holland

- Dream of the Elders (ECM, 1995)
- Points of View (ECM,1997)
- Prime Directive (ECM, 1998)
- Not for Nothin' (ECM, 2000)
- What Goes Around (ECM, 2002)
- Extended Play: Live at Birdland (ECM, 2003)
- Overtime (Dare2, 2005)
- Critical Mass (Dare2, 2006)
- Pathways (Dare2, 2010)

With David "Fathead" Newman

- Still Hard Times (Muse, 1982)
- Heads Up (Atlantic, 1987)
- Fire! Live at the Village Vanguard (Atlantic, 1989)
- I Remember Brother Ray (HighNote, 2005)
- Life (HighNote, 2007)
- The Blessing (HighNote, 2009)

With others

- James Spaulding, James Spaulding Plays the Legacy of Duke Ellington (Storyville, 1977)
- James Spaulding, James Spaulding Plays the Legacy of Duke Ellington (Storyville, 1977)
- Kenny Barron, Golden Lotus (Muse, 1982)
- Curtis Lundy, Just Be Yourself (New Note, 1987)
- Mulgrew Miller, Wingspan (Landmark, 1987)
- Donald Brown, People Music (Muse, 1990)
- Billy Drummond, Native Colours (Criss Cross, 1992)
- Mulgrew Miller, Hand in Hand (Novus, 1992)
- Geoff Keezer, Trio (Sackville, 1993)
- Ray Drummond, Continuum (Arabesque, 1994)
- Chip White, Harlem Sunset (Postcards, 1994)
- Jonny King, Notes from the Underground (Enja, 1996)
- Curtis Lundy, Purpose (Justin Time, 2002)
- Houston Person, The Melody Lingers On (HighNote, 2014)
- Bruce Barth, Daybreak (Savant, 2014)
- Houston Person, Something Personal (HighNote, 2015)
- Chris Potter, Imaginary Cities (ECM, 2015)
- Cyrus Chestnut, There's a Sweet, Sweet Spirit (HighNote, 2017)
- Kenny Barron, Beyond This Place (Artwork, 2024)
- Faye Carol, A Soulful Christmas (Getdown, 2026)
