= Points of View (album) =

Studio album by Dave Holland Quintet
- Released: 4 April 1998
- Recorded: September 25–26, 1997
- Studio: Avatar (New York, New York)
- Genre: Jazz
- Length: 71:54
- Label: ECM; ECM 1663
- Producer: Dave Holland

Dave Holland chronology
Dream of the Elders (1995)	Points of View (1998)	Prime Directive (1999)

Dave Holland Quintet chronology
The Razor's Edge (1987)	Points of View (1998)	Prime Directive (1999)

Points of View is a studio album by the Dave Holland Quintet recorded over two days in September 1997 and released on ECM April the following year. The quintet features saxophonist Steve Wilson, trombonist Robin Eubanks, vibraphonist Steve Nelson, and drummer Billy Kilson.

== Reception ==
David Lynch of The Austin Chronicle wrote, "Opposed to the more common jazz quartet, a quintet's extra musician brings forth more moods, textures, and possibilities."

Geoffrey Himes of The Washington Post wrote "In the ongoing tradition of Charles Mingus, two of the most creative bandleaders in jazz today are bassist-composers, Charlie Haden and Dave Holland. Bassists—who solo at their own peril—understand better than anyone that in jazz the ensemble interaction is more important than the individual showcases. And it's the subtle, democratic give-and-take—where the drummer and bassist matter as much as the keyboardist and horn players—that makes the Dave Holland Quintet's "Points of View" so enthralling."

The AllMusic review by Richard S. Ginell awarded the album 4 stars, calling it "a marvelous example of thoughtful, dynamically shifting ECM chamber jazz."

Professional ratings
Review scores
Source	Rating
The Austin Chronicle	3.5/5 stars
The Penguin Guide to Jazz Recordings	4/4 stars
AllMusic	4/5 stars

== Track listing ==
All tracks are written by Dave Holland except as noted.

No.	Title	Writer(s)	Length
1.	"The Balance"		9:24
2.	"Mr. B." (dedicated to Ray Brown)		11:01
3.	"Bedouin Trail"		8:55
4.	"Metamorphos"	Robin Eubanks	8:29
5.	"Ario"		10:24
6.	"Herbaceous" (dedicated to Herbie Hancock)		9:47
7.	"The Benevolent One"	Steve Wilson	7:05
8.	"Serenade"	Nelson	6:49

== Personnel ==
=== Dave Holland Quintet ===
- Steve Wilson – soprano and alto saxophones
- Robin Eubanks – trombone
- Steve Nelson – vibraphone, marimba
- Dave Holland – double bass
- Billy Kilson – drums
