= Prime Directive (album) =

Studio album by the Dave Holland Quintet
- Released: 4 October 1999
- Recorded: December 10–12, 1998
- Studio: Avatar (New York, New York)
- Genre: Jazz
- Length: 1:16:43
- Label: ECM; ECM 1698
- Producer: Dave Holland

Dave Holland chronology
Points of View (1998)	Prime Directive (1999)	Not for Nothin' (2001)

Dave Holland Quintet chronology
Points of View (1998)	Prime Directive (1999)	Not for Nothin' (2001)

Prime Directive is an album by the Dave Holland Quintet recorded over three days in December 1998 and released on ECM October the following year. The quintet features saxophonist Chris Potter, trombonist Robin Eubanks, vibraphonist Steve Nelson, and drummer Billy Kilson.

== Title ==
Speaking with Innerviews, Holland explained:

It started with a conversation with my wife I had when we were just putting this band together. I had been in a few situations which were not really fun, but musically good. There were problems of one sort or another. I decided at this stage in my life that I wanted to enjoy music. I have to say one of the things that really influenced me is my time recently with Herbie Hancock. I’ve worked with him on and off from ’91 to ’96 in trio and quartet formats. Herbie enjoys himself whenever he plays. He has a lot of fun and it doesn’t stop him from being creative or playing amazingly inventively. That was when a sort of release occurred and a cognition formed. Until then, I took music quite seriously and was prepared to put up with certain things in order to have certain other things happen. Then I decided if I wasn’t enjoying myself, something was wrong and it had to be changed. And then it got to simplifying that statement into "If it’s not fun, we’ve got to do something different." Then I said to my wife "That’s got to be the prime directive of this band" and that’s how the whole thing got started. (emphasis added)

== Reception ==
Professional ratings
Review scores
Source	Rating
AllMusic	4.5/5 stars
Tom Hull	A−

In 2000 the Jazz Journalists Association honored the recording with their award Album of the Year. The AllMusic review by Brian Bartolini awarded the album 4½ stars, stating:

Tremendous taste prevents Holland from making unsatisfying music. He is a great leader in the truest senses of the word—he gives his team space, trusts their abilities and judgment, yet all the while remains firmly in command and infuses the results with his own style and personality. Prime Directive is a wonderful jazz album. These 77 minutes and nine tracks do not cheat or disappoint... Prime Directive is recommended; a great leader is, indeed, hard to find.

== Track listing ==
All tracks are written by Dave Holland except as noted.

No.	Title	Writer(s)	Length
1.	"Prime Directive"		7:46
2.	"Looking Up"		13:32
3.	"Make Believe"		6:25
4.	"A Seeking Spirit"	Robin Eubanks	11:21
5.	"High Wire"	Chris Potter	6:49
6.	"Jugglers Parade"		8:14
7.	"Candelight Vigil"	Steve Nelson	4:51
8.	"Wonders Never Cease"	Billy Kilson	13:55
9.	"Down Time"		3:48

== Personnel ==
=== Dave Holland Quintet ===
- Chris Potter – soprano, alto, and tenor saxophones
- Robin Eubanks – trombone
- Steve Nelson – vibraphone, marimba
- Dave Holland – double bass
- Billy Kilson – drums
