= Mark Gross (musician) =

American jazz musician

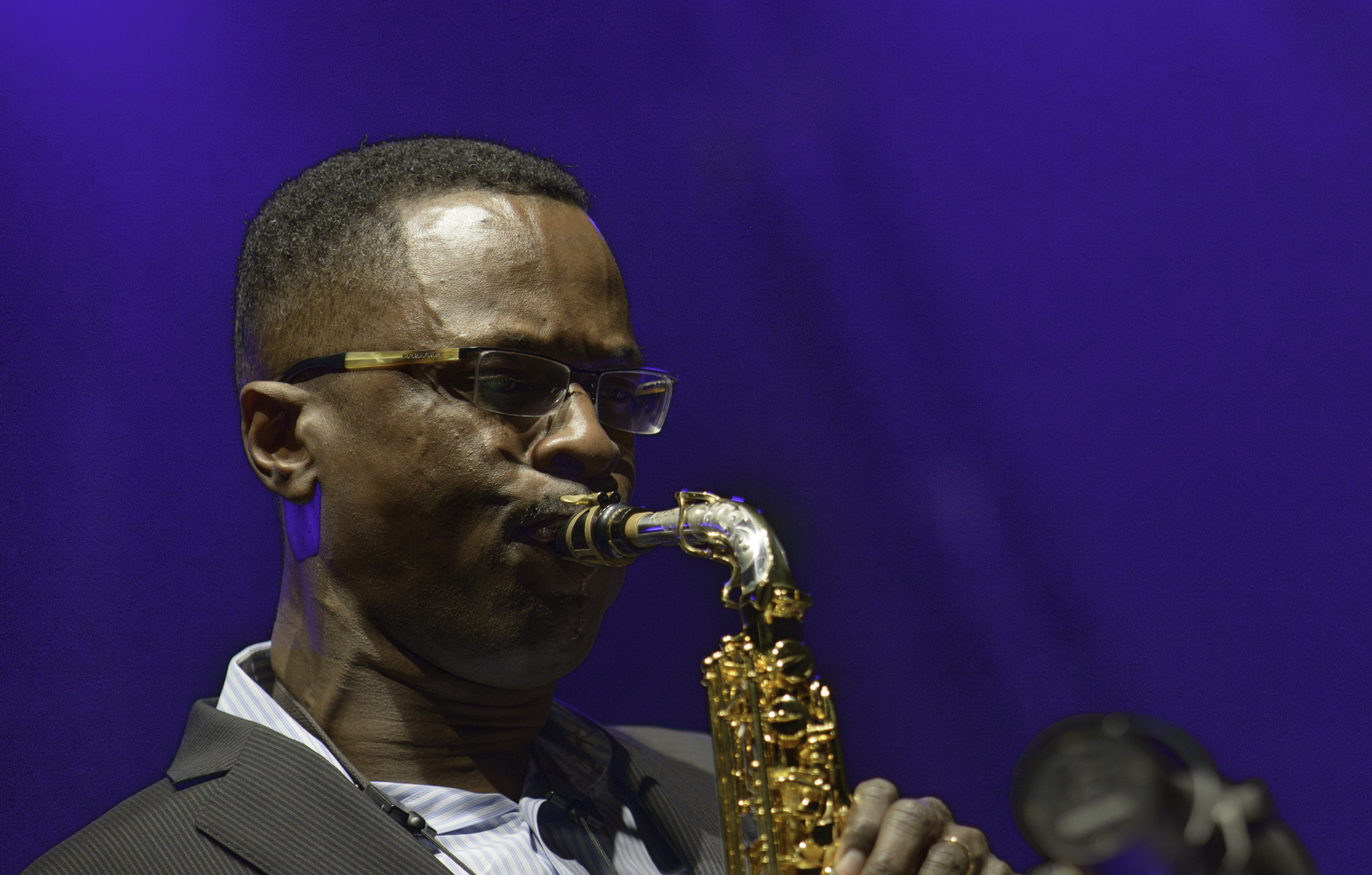
Mark Gross in 2014

Mark Gross (born February 20, 1966) is an American jazz alto saxophonist of the hard bop tradition. He studied at the Berklee College of Music, graduating in 1988, then worked in the band of Lionel Hampton and performed in Five Guys Named Moe on Broadway. He has since worked with a variety of other artists, including the bands of Delfeayo Marsalis, Nat Adderley and the Dave Holland Big Band. Gross also plays soprano, tenor and baritone saxophones, flute and clarinet.

== Jazz ==
Two-time Grammy award winner with the Dave Holland Big Band, Gross has recorded on over 100 jazz recordings, including Grammy-winning projects by the Dave Holland Big Band - 'What Goes Around' on ECM Records, and 'Overtime' on Dare 2 Records.

Gross has released four albums under his own name including Preach Daddy on King Records, Riddle of the Sphinx on J Curve Records, Blackside on Jazz Legacy Productions (JLP), + Strings (MGQ Records), and The Gospel According to Mark: A Jazz Suite (MGQ Records).

Gross has toured the world with the Mark Gross Quartet, Buster Williams, Philip Harper, Nat Adderley, Dave Holland, Mulgrew Miller, Nicholas Payton, Delfeayo Marsalis, Wynton Marsalis, Dizzy Gillespie, Nancy Wilson, Jimmy Heath, Dizzy Gillespie Alumni Big Band, Village Vanguard Jazz Orchestra, Tom Harrell Big Band, Duke Ellington Orchestra, Frank Foster and the Loud Minority, Charles Mingus Big Band, Freddie Hubbard, Donald Harrison, Mark Whitfield, Joe Dukes, Captain Jack McDuff, Joe Chambers, Neal Smith, Cyrus Chestnut, Regina Carter, Lionel Hampton, Stephon Harris, Walter Booker, Jimmy Cobb, Don Braden, Vincent Gardner, Lenora Zenzalai Helm, Marlon Saunders, SEPIA and Jann Parker among others.

== Broadway ==
Gross has performed on Broadway consistently. His credits include Five Guys Named Moe (1992-1993) based on the music of Louis Jordan, and Kat and the Kings (1999-2000), based on music born out of oppression during the 1950s in Cape Town, South Africa; as well as 'Swing!' (2000-2001).

Gross performed in After Midnight, The Broadway production, which began previews at the Brooks Atkinson Theatre on October 18, 2013, and opened on November 3, 2013, with special guest star Fantasia Barrino, who performed through February 9, 2014. The production features Dule Hill as "The Host", Adriane Lenox, Karine Plantadit and Desmond Richardson.

Gross also performed in Shuffle Along, or, the Making of the Musical Sensation of 1921 and All That Followed is a musical with a score by Eubie Blake and Noble Sissle and a libretto by George C. Wolfe, based on the original book of the 1921 musical revue Shuffle Along, by Flournoy Miller and Aubrey Lyles. The story focuses on the challenges of mounting the original production of Shuffle Along and its effect on Broadway and race relations. Ain’t Too Proud: The Life and Times of The Temptations is a 2018 jukebox musical with music and lyrics by The Temptations and a book by Dominique Morisseau. Based on the story of The Temptations, the musical had a series of regional productions and opened at Broadway’s Imperial Theatre in March 2019.

A Wonderful World - The Louis Armstrong Musical, another of Gross' Broadway credits, is a jukebox stage musical with a book by Aurin Squire. The musical tells an autobiographical account of the life of jazz musician Louis Armstrong (1901–1971), from the perspective of the four wives he had during his lifetime, Daisy Parker, Lillian Hardin, Alpha Smith, and Lucille Wilson. The title comes from the song "What a Wonderful World", originally released in 1967 and written by Bob Thiele and George David Weiss. The show opened on Broadway at Studio 54 on November 11, 2024, following previews beginning a month earlier. The show closed on February 23, 2025. The production ran for 151 performances, including 31 previews.

== Educator ==
In 2015, Gross became the director of jazz instruction for the New Jersey Performing Arts Center in Newark, New Jersey, running its Jazz for Teens program.

== Early life ==
Gross credits his sound to the appreciation for gospel music that resounded through his parents' Baltimore home. Gross' father was pastor of his hometown church Mt. Zion C.O.G.I.C. up until his death February 1, 2007. After developing his interests in classical music at the Baltimore School for the Arts, Gross studied one semester at Howard University and four years at Berklee College of Music. He earned a Bachelor of Arts Degree in Music Performance at Berklee College of Music, where he studied under professors Joe Viola and Bill Pierce. Upon graduation in 1988, Gross began his professional music career in jazz.

== Discography ==
As a leader:

- Preach Daddy, King Records, (1997)
- The Riddle of the Sphinx, J Curve, (2000)
- Blackside, Jazz Legacy Productions, (2013)
- Mark Gross + Strings, MGQ, (2018)
- The Gospel According to Mark: A Jazz Suite, MGQ, (2025)

With the Dave Holland Big Band:

- What Goes Around, ECM Records, 1777 014002-2 (2002)
- Overtime, Dare 2 Records, (2005)

With Spirit of Life Ensemble:

- Spirit of Life Ensemble, Live! at the Five Spot, Rise Up Productions (1992)
- Spirit of Life Ensemble, Inspirations, Rise Up Productions/Zazou Records (1992)
- Spirit of Life Ensemble, Feel The Spirit, Rise Up Productions (1994)
- Spirit of Life Ensemble, Live At Pori Jazz, Rise Up Productions RUP 100-9 (1997)
- Spirit of Life Ensemble, Collage, Rise Up Productions RUP100-10 (1998)
- Spirit of Life Ensemble, Song For My Father, King Records KICJ 361

With Metta Quintet:

- Metta Quintet, Going to Meet the Man, Koch Jazz KOC-CD-51413 (2002)
- Metta Quintet, Subway Songs, Sunnyside SSC-1151 (2006)

With the Jimmy Heath Big Band:

- The Jimmy Heath Big Band, Turn Up the Heath, Planet Arts 100560 (2006)
- Jimmy Heath Big Band, (Live at the Blue Note) Togetherness, Jazz Legacy Productions - JLP 1201022 (2011)

With Antonio Hart:

- Antonio Hart, Here I Stand, Impulse IMPD - 208 (1997)
- Antonio Hart, For Cannonball and Woody, Novus/BMG 63162-2

With Shingo Okudaira:

- Shingo Okudaira, Kilfi, King Records KICJ 252
- Shingo Okudaira, Maconde, King Records KICJ 292

With Delfeayo Marsalis:

- Delfeayo Marsalis, Pontius Pilate's Decision, Novus/BMG 63134-2 (1992)
- Delfeayo Marsalis, Musashi, King Records KICJ 286 (1996)
- Delfeayo Marsalis, Sweet Thunder, Troubador Jazz Records TRJ092110 (2011)

With Yoichi Kobayashi:

- Yoichi Kobayashi, Good Fellas, King Records KICJ 101
- Yoichi Kobayashi, Good Fellas 2, King Records KICJ 115

Other projects:

- Philip Harper, The Thirteenth Moon, Muse 5520 (1994)
- George Gee and his Jump Jivin' Wailers, If Dreams Come True, GJazz, (2007)
- Tony Bennett & Lady Gaga, Cheek to Cheek, Columbia, (2014)
- Dick Oatts/Matts Holquist/New York Jazz Orchestra, A Tribute to Herbie +1, Summit Records, (2016)
- Derek Gardner, Still I Rise, Impact Jazz, (2020)
- Andy Farber and his Orchestra, Early Blue Evening, ArtistShare, (2021)
- Roseanna Vitro, Sing a Song of a Bird, ArtistShare, (2021)
- Kengo Nakamura, Songs in My Life Time, 55 Records - FNCJ-5555
- Lenora Zenzalai Helm, Voice Paintings, MidLantic Records USA MR-2003-207
- the JazzHole, And the Feeling Goes Round, Bluemoon 92586
- Brad Leali Jazz Orchestra, Maria Juanez, The Montreux Jazz Label TCB26902
- Five Guys Named Moe, (Original Broadway Cast Recording), Columbia CK 52999
- Barry Manilow, Singin' With Big Bands, Arista 07822-18771-2
- Cleo Laine with The Duke Ellington Orchestra, Solitude, RCA VICTOR 09026-68124-2
- Marica Hiraga, Sings with The Duke Ellington Orchestra, DDCB-13020
- Gemma Genazzano, If You Love Me, Precious Stone Music
- Winard Harper and Jeli Posse, COEXIST, JLP 1201018
- Brooklyn Big Band, Love At Sweet Rhythm, Candid CCD 71803
- Mighty Sparrow, The Supreme Serenader, BLSCD1022
- Marlon Saunders, A Groove So Deep (the live sessions), Black Honey Records
- Gregory Generet, (re) generet-ion, Monsieur Music Records
- Vincent Gardner, Three-Five, SteepleChase - SCCD 31671
- Tobias Gebb & Unit 7, free at last, yummy house records
- Oleg Butman, Passion, Butman Music
- Joris Teepe Big Band, We Take No Prisoners, Challenge Records - CR73284
- Anthony Branker & Ascent, Together, Origin Records - Origin 82627
- Derrick Shezbie, Spodie's Back, Qwest/Reprise 9 45299-2
- SEPIA, Absence of Pain, Potazul COCY - 80282
- Ted Curson, Travelin' On, King Records KICJ 289
- Duke Ellington Orchestra, Only God Can Make A Tree, MusicMasters 01612-65117-2
- Gene Gardener, Coming Out, Gene & Shoko Records
- Masahiko Osaka, Walkin' Down Lexington, King Records KICJ 351
- Lenora Zenzalai Helm, Spirit Child, J Curve Records JCR1005
- Tom Harrell, Time's Mirror, RCA/Victor 09026-63524-2 (1999)
- Jann Parker, Voicings, 1JP286
- Dizzy Gillespie All-Star Big Band, I'm BeBoppin Too, Half Note records - HN4540
