= Uncharted Territories =

Studio album by Dave Holland
- Released: May 11, 2018
- Recorded: May 2–3, 2017
- Studios: NRS Studio, Catskill, NY
- Genre: Free jazz
- Length: 130:52
- Label: Dare2 Records
- Producer: Dave Holland

Dave Holland chronology
Aziza (2016)	Uncharted Territories (2018)	Without Deception (2020)

Professional ratings
Review scores
Source	Rating
All About Jazz	4.5/5 stars
Blurt	4/5 stars
DownBeat	4/5 stars
Financial Times	4/5 stars
Jazzwise	3/5 stars
The Sydney Morning Herald	4.5/5 stars
Tom Hull	A−

Uncharted Territories is a double album by English jazz bassist Dave Holland together with saxophonist Evan Parker, percussionist Ches Smith, and pianist Craig Taborn. The album was released on May 11, 2018 via Holland's own Dare2 Records label.

== Critical reception ==
S. Victor Aaron of Something Else! stated "A blessed combination of two shores and two generations but a remarkably single minded mission to make magic from dust, the double CD free jazz extravaganza Uncharted Territories continues the fertile tradition of cross-pollination between the American and British free jazz scenes. As the man in the middle of this tradition, Dave Holland continues to add meaningful music to an already ample, rewarding catalog". Martin Longley writing for DownBeat commented, " The joy of having 23 tracks is that just as many approaches are available, from soft, tentative transparency to agitated, emphatic spikiness." Mac Randall in his review for JazzTimes noted, "To have the bassist and saxophonist renew their lengthy acquaintance in a recording studio is notable enough, but to make matters more intriguing, they’ve hooked up on this double-disc set with two players of a younger generation and a similar free spirit, keyboardist Craig Taborn and drummer-percussionist Ches Smith. Only three of the 23 tracks were pre-written; the rest are free improvisations, titled according to their instrument combinations... Not shockingly, Holland and Parker acquit themselves well throughout."

Paul Weideman of The New Mexican wrote "In May 2017, two English-born jazz veterans — bassist Dave Holland, seventy-one, and saxophonist Evan Parker, seventy-four — spent two days in the studio with Craig Taborn (keyboards and electronics) and Ches Smith (percussion). The result is 23 tracks, totaling two hours and 12 minutes of what truly qualifies as “aliveness music.” ... On the whole, the album is a beautiful and exhilarating event!" Mike Hobart writing for Financial Times added, "But for the most part, Holland applies his firm lines and resonant tone to the free jazz methods he pioneered in late 1960s London alongside the likes of saxophonist Evan Parker, who plays tenor on this recording. And with Taborn complementing Parker’s bell-tone murmurations and Smith equally astute, Holland’s through-form jazz sounds fresh, resolute and contemporary."

== Track listing ==
Disc one
No.	Title	Length
1.	"Thought on Earth"	7:37
2.	"Piano - Bass - Percussion T1"	5:47
3.	"Q&A"	4:40
4.	"Tenor - Percussion W2"	3:25
5.	"QT12"	6:10
6.	"Tenor - Bass W3"	2:44
7.	"QW2"	8:17
8.	"Tenor - Piano - Bass T2"	5:36
9.	"Organ - Vibes W1"	6:14
10.	"Bass - Percussion T2"	5:07
11.	"Tenor - Piano - Percussion T1"	9:34

Disc two
No.	Title	Length
1.	"QT13"	6:25
2.	"Tenor - Bass - Percussion T2"	4:10
3.	"Piano - Percussion W3"	5:01
4.	"QT5"	6:54
5.	"Tenor - Bass W1"	4:16
6.	"Piano - Bass - Percussion T2"	5:37
7.	"Unsteady As She Goes"	5:39
8.	"Bass - Percussion T1"	6:02
9.	"QW5"	2:26
10.	"Tenor - Bass - Percussion T1"	5:18
11.	"Tenor - Bass W2"	3:46
12.	"QW1"	10:07

Quote from the liner notes: "At the end of the two days of recording we had almost six hours of recorded material from which we've selected the 23 tracks featured on this release. The spontaneously created tracks use a code for the title that designates the instrumentation, the day and the take number." For example: QT12 = Quartet, Tuesday, Take 12. Tenor - Bass W3 = Tenor Bass Duo, Wednesday, Take 3.

== Personnel ==
- Dave Holland – bass
- Evan Parker – tenor sax
- Craig Taborn – piano, keyboards, organ, electronics
- Ches Smith – percussion

== Charts ==
Chart	Peak position
US Top Jazz Albums (Billboard)	7
