= Concentric Circles (Kenny Barron album) =

Studio album by Kenny Barron
- Released: May 4, 2018
- Recorded: March 19–20, 2017
- Studios: Systems Two Studios, Brooklyn, New York
- Genre: Jazz
- Length: 66:17
- Label: Blue Note
- Producer: Kenny Barron

Kenny Barron chronology
Book of Intuition (2016)	Concentric Circles (2018)	Without Deception (2020)

Professional ratings
Review scores
Source	Rating
All About Jazz	4.5/5 stars
AllMusic	4/5 stars
Blurt	4/5 stars
Financial Times	4/5 stars
The Guardian	4/5 stars
RTÉ.ie	4/5 stars
Spectrum Culture	4/5 stars
The Times	4/5 stars
Tom Hull	B+
Winnipeg Free Press	4/5 stars

Concentric Circles is a studio album by American jazz pianist Kenny Barron. The record was released on May 4, 2018 via Blue Note label.

== Background ==
This is Barron's debut album for Blue Note. The album features Barron with a new band consisting of three strong emerging players—tenor saxophonist Dayna Stephens, trumpeter Mike Rodriguez, and drummer Johnathan Blake—and a long-term Barron's collaborator bassist Kiyoshi Kitagawa. The record consists of 11 tracks of which there are eight original compositions written by Barron.

== Reception ==
Matt Collar of AllMusic wrote "While Barron has never sounded anything short of virtuosic, his skills have only deepened over the years. He commands the album, framing his musicians with richly textured chord voicings one minute, and launching into evocative improvisational asides the next. What's particularly refreshing is how immediate and of-the-moment the album feels. Concentric Circles is the sound of a jazz master continuing to push forward, buoyed by his bandmates and the lessons of the past". A reviewer of Keyboard stated "Concentric Circles is another sparkling jewel in Barron’s crown; and it surely won’t be the last". Writing for JazzTimes, Thomas Conrad stated, "The set list is not unusual, containing mostly recent originals plus typical choices like a Brazilian piece and a Monk tune. What makes a Barron record special is execution, the distinctive substance and elegance..."

Will Layman of Spectrum Culture noted "This is a program marked by variety as well as quality... Barron’s affection for Latin grooves is here in spades." Paddy Cahoe of RTÉ.ie added "Kenny Barron's Concentric Circles is the legendary jazz pianist's first bona fide quintet release since 2003's Images and it is a fine affair, skirting around the lighter edges of bop, with Afro-Latin and bossa nova traces". Dave Gelly of The Guardian commented "Now, a pianist, composer and bandleader of apparently infinite resource and ingenuity, he records albums as close to perfection as anyone could wish. Lately they have tended to be piano trios, but this sleek new quintet sounds full of promise". Keith Black writing for Winnipeg Free Press added, "Kenny Barron has been a gift to the jazz world for 50 years and hopefully is not close to being done yet."

== Track listing ==
All tracks are written by Kenny Barron, except where noted.

Concentric Circles track listing
No.	Title	Writer(s)	Length
1.	"DPW"		4:52
2.	"Concentric Circles"		7:27
3.	"Blue Waters"		5:40
4.	"A Short Journey"		5:29
5.	"Aquele Frevo Axe"	Cesar Medes; Caetano Veloso	8:16
6.	"Von Hangman"		4:44
7.	"In the Dark"		7:01
8.	"Baile"		5:17
9.	"L's Bop"	Lenny White	5:55
10.	"I'm Just Sayin'"		6:52
11.	"Reflections"	Thelonious Monk	4:44
Total length:			66:17

== Personnel ==
Band

- Kenny Barron – piano, producer
- Kiyoshi Kitagawa – bass
- Johnathan Blake – drums
- Dayna Stephens – saxophone
- Mike Rodriguez – trumpet, flugelhorn

Production

- Karen Kennedy – co-producer
- Max Ross – mixing, mastering
- Joe Marciano – recording
