= Dedication (Robin Eubanks and Steve Turre album) =

Studio album by Robin Eubanks & Steve Turre
- Released: 1989
- Recorded: April 1989; RPM Sound Studios, NYC
- Genre: Jazz
- Length: 50:05
- Label: JMT; JMT 834 433
- Producer: Stefan F. Winter, Robin Eubanks & Steve Turre

Robin Eubanks chronology
Different Perspectives (1989)	Dedication (1989)	Karma (1990)

Steve Turre chronology
Fire and Ice (1988)	Dedication (1989)	Right There (1991)

Dedication is an album by trombonists Robin Eubanks and Steve Turre which was recorded in 1989 and released on the JMT label.

== Reception ==
Professional ratings
Review scores
Source	Rating
AllMusic	4/5 stars
The Penguin Guide to Jazz Recordings	4/4 stars

The AllMusic review by Scott Yanow stated "Eubanks and Turre had worked together on and off for nearly four years at this point and their familiarity with each other's playing shows. Add to the two trombones a strong and flexible rhythm section and the result is a stimluating and varied set of modern jazz". The Chicago Tribune's Jack Fuller wrote "Robin Eubanks and Steve Turre are two of the best younger trombonists, but on this album their approach is surprisingly conservative".

== Track listing ==
All compositions by Robin Eubanks except as indicated

1. "The New Breed" - 6:22
2. "V.O." (Steve Turre) - 6:11
3. "Red, Black and Green Blues" - 6:33
4. "Trance Dance" (Steve Turre) - 6:43
5. "Perpetual Groove" - 5:03
6. "Especially for You" (Steve Turre) - 7:16
7. "Koncepts" (Steve Turre) - 5:02
8. "Victory" - 6:55

== Personnel ==
- Robin Eubanks - trombone, bass trombone, keyboards, bells
- Steve Turre - trombone, sea shells, synthesizer, bells, claves
- Mulgrew Miller - piano, synthesizers
- Francesca Tanksley - synthesizer
- Charnett Moffett - bass
- Tommy Campbell, Tony Reedus - drums
- Jimmy Delgado - congas, timbales
