= Book of Intuition =

Studio album by Kenny Barron
- Released: March 4, 2016
- Recorded: July 3–4, 2015
- Studio: Avatar, New York City
- Genre: Jazz
- Length: 66:00
- Label: Impulse!
- Producer: Jean-Philippe Allard, Kenny Barron

Kenny Barron chronology
The Art of Conversation (2014)	Book of Intuition (2016)	Concentric Circles (2018)

Professional ratings
Review scores
Source	Rating
The Daily Telegraph	4/5 stars
The Guardian	4/5 stars
The Irish Times	3/5 stars
Jazzwise	3/5 stars
The Observer	5/5 stars
Record Collector	3/5 stars
The Times	4/5 stars
Tom Hull	B+

Book of Intuition is a studio album by jazz pianist Kenny Barron with bassist Kiyoshi Kitagawa and drummer Johnathan Blake. The album was released on March 4, 2016, via Impulse! Records label.

== Background ==
The album contains 10 tracks, of which seven are Barron's original compositions written in a period of time. Two pieces, "In the Slow Lane" and "Prayer", were featured in the soundtrack for 2010 film Another Harvest Moon. Book of Intuition is Barron's first trio album in 20 some years—since Wanton Spirit with Charlie Haden and Roy Haynes. Barron has performed onstage with Kitagawa and Blake for 20 and 10 years, respectively, yet he had never recorded an album with his long-time trio until this album.

The album earned the trio a Grammy Award nomination for Best Jazz Instrumental Album.

== Reception ==
John Fordham of The Guardian noted: "Barron has absorbed an encyclopaedia of jazz methods from a life on the road with legends such as Ella Fitzgerald and Stan Getz, and it pours out in these tracks. Magic Dance, with its glistening chords and Latin-jazz tick, sounds smooth at first but unleashes an impulsive torrent. Ballads such as In the Slow Lane display his impeccably light touch and Thelonious Monk’s Shuffle Boil isn’t Monkishly lateral but swings furiously. The jangling Lunacy is a collective bustle prodded by bassist Kiyoshi Kitagawa and drummer Johnathan Blake, while Nightfall is delicate drift through slow chords. There might be too many notes for some on this record, but it’s almost all affectingly musical just the same". Dave Gelly in his review for The Observer wrote, "It has everything – attractive melody, unbuttoned swing, virtuosity and enough rhythmic sleight-of-hand to keep you wide awake. Among the dozen or so most admired pianists in jazz today, Kenny Barron strikes me as the one who wears his mastery most comfortably."

Cormak Larkin of The Irish Times wrote: "Barron’s latest trio, with the impeccable rhythm team of bassist Kiyoshi Kitagawa and drummer Jonathan Blake, is as assured and authoritative as you would expect, here emphasising the Latin side of the trio tradition with a deeply grooving set of originals (and a couple of Monk tunes) that sparkle like cut glass". Fred Kaplan writing for Stereophile commented, "The session ... has a warm, crisp sound with plenty of air and thump, though the drums are a little bit two-dimensional." Mac Randal of JazzTimes wrote, "For some strange reason, the trio that Kenny Barron has been leading for the past decade, featuring bassist Kiyoshi Kitagawa and drummer Johnathan Blake, had never cut an album until now. We should all thank the deity of our choice that they finally entered a recording studio, because Book of Intuition is a total delight."

== Track listing ==
No.	Title	Writer(s)	Length
1.	"Magic Dance"	Barron	7:51
2.	"Bud Like"	Barron	5:28
3.	"Cook's Bay"	Barron	6:00
4.	"In the Slow Lane"	Barron	6:34
5.	"Shuffle Boil"	Thelonious Monk	6:55
6.	"Light Blue"	Thelonious Monk	4:09
7.	"Lunacy"	Barron	5:09
8.	"Dreams"	Barron	5:59
9.	"Prayer"	Barron	4:43
10.	"Nightfall"	Charlie Haden	7:06
Total length:			1:06:00

== Personnel ==
Band

- Kenny Barron – piano, producer
- Kiyoshi Kitagawa – double bass
- Johnathan Blake – drums

Production

- Marielle Costosèque – design
- Patrice Beauséjour – design
- Farida Bachir – executive producer, art direction
- John Murph – liner notes
- Mark Wilder – mastering
- Jean-Philippe Allard – producer
- Jay Newland – recording, mixing

== Charts ==
Chart (2016)	Peak position
French Albums (SNEP)	184
