= Kevin Eubanks =

American guitarist (born 1957)

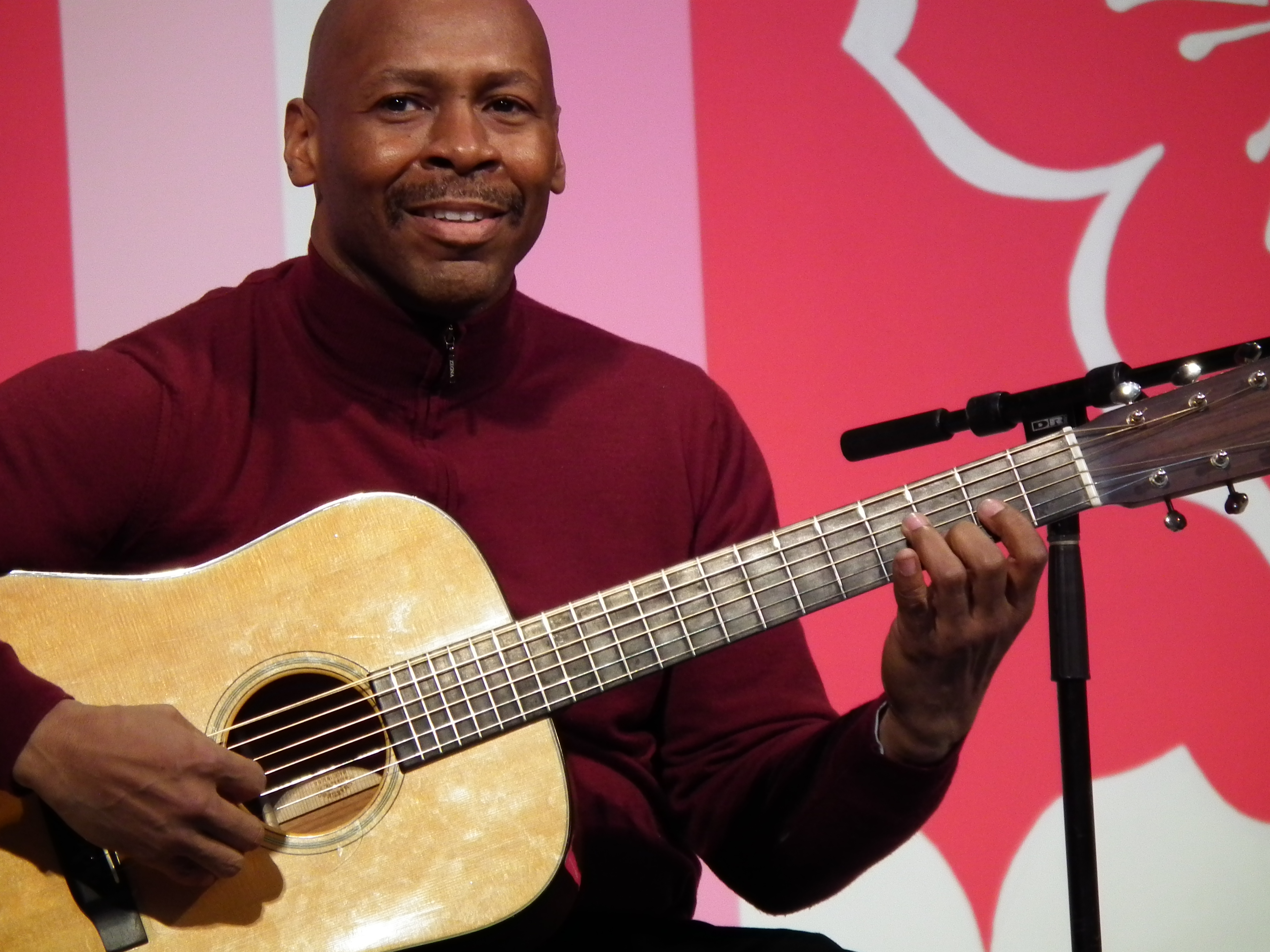
- Eubanks performing at the 2011 National Cherry Blossom Festival

Background information
- Born: Kevin Tyrone Eubanks; November 15, 1957 (age 68); Philadelphia, Pennsylvania, U.S.
- Genres: Jazz; rock
- Occupations: Musician; composer
- Instrument: Guitar
- Years active: 1982–present
- Label: Mack Avenue
- Website: kevineubanks.com

Kevin Tyrone Eubanks (born November 15, 1957) is an American jazz and fusion guitarist and composer. He was the leader of The Tonight Show Band with host Jay Leno from 1995 to its original conclusion in 2009, and briefly again from March to May 2010 when the program was revived. He also led The Primetime Band on the short-lived The Jay Leno Show from September 2009 to February 2010.

== Early life and education ==
Eubanks was born into a musical family. His older brother, Robin Eubanks, is a trombonist, and his younger brothers Duane Eubanks is a trumpeter and Shane Eubanks is a DJ. As an elementary school student, Eubanks was trained in violin, trumpet, and piano at the Settlement Music School (in Philadelphia). He later attended Berklee College of Music (in Boston, Massachusetts).

== Personal life ==
Eubanks grew up in Philadelphia in a notable jazz family. His mother, Vera, was a public-school music teacher and played the Hammond organ for their local church. His uncles were Ray Bryant and Tommy Bryant, both known musicians. Eubanks was exposed at a young age to gospel music. Eubanks is a pescetarian and maintains a diet of fresh fruits, vegetables, grains, egg whites, and fish.

== Career ==
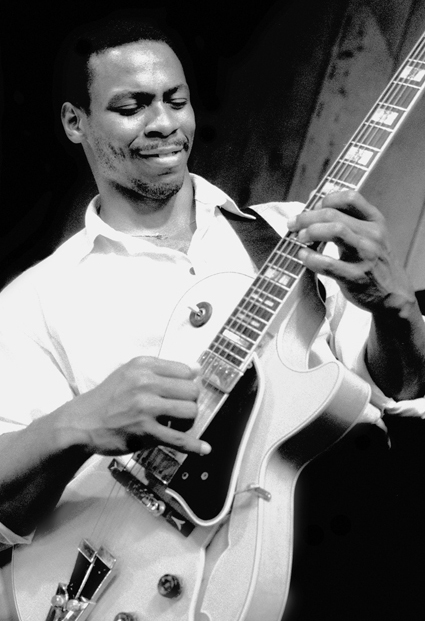
Eubanks performing at Bach Dancing & Dynamite Society, Half Moon Bay, California, October 1988.

After Eubanks moved to New York, he began performing with noted jazzmen such as Art Blakey (1980–81), Roy Haynes, Slide Hampton, and Sam Rivers. Like his brother Robin, Eubanks has played on record with double bassist Dave Holland.

In 1983, while continuing to perform with others, he formed his own quartet, playing gigs in Jordan, Pakistan, and India on a tour sponsored by the U.S. State Department.

In 2020, Eubanks appeared as a guest on the Studio 60 on the Sunset Strip marathon fundraiser episode of The George Lucas Talk Show. In the fall of 2021, Eubanks returned to working with Leno, as a sidekick on a revival of the TV game show You Bet Your Life.

=== Recording ===
His first recording as a leader, Guitarist, was released on the Elektra label when Eubanks was 25 years old. It led to a seven-album contract with the GRP label and four albums for Blue Note. In total, Eubanks has appeared on over 100 albums. In 2001, he founded the label Insoul Music on which he has released six albums.

=== Teaching ===
Eubanks has taught at the Banff School of Fine Arts in Canada, at Rutgers University, and at the Charlie Parker School in Perugia, Italy. In 2005, Eubanks received an honorary doctorate degree from his alma mater, Berklee College of Music. He has served as an active member of the Artistic Advisory Panel of the BMI Foundation since 1999.

=== The Tonight Show ===
In 1992, Eubanks moved to the West Coast to play guitar in The Tonight Show Band. He composed "Kevin's Country", the closing theme music for The Tonight Show with Jay Leno. In 1995, he replaced Branford Marsalis as leader of the band.

When NBC moved Leno's show from late night to prime time, Eubanks moved with the band to continue conducting music for the short-lived The Jay Leno Show. Eubanks appeared on the new show as The Primetime Band.

On April 12, 2010, Eubanks announced on the show that he would be leaving The Tonight Show following its 18th season. His last show was on May 30, 2010. He indicated in an interview with The Philadelphia Inquirer that he wanted to concentrate on music, adding that his leaving was not provoked by any problems with Leno or NBC. Following his departure, he began touring with bandmate Marvin "Smitty" Smith on drums, Bill Pierce on saxophone, and Rene Camacho on bass.

== Discography ==
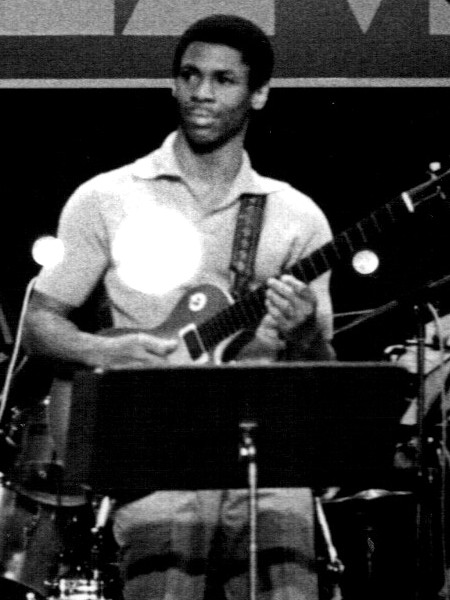
Eubanks performing in 1978

=== As leader ===
- Guitarist (Elektra Musician, 1983)
- Sundance (GRP, 1984)
- Opening Night (GRP, 1985)
- Face to Face (GRP, 1986)
- The Heat of Heat (GRP, 1987)
- Shadow Prophets (GRP, 1988)
- The Searcher (GRP, 1989)
- Promise of Tomorrow (GRP, 1990)
- Turning Point (Blue Note, 1992)
- Spirit Talk (Blue Note, 1993)
- Live at Bradley's (Blue Note, 1994)
- Spirit Talk 2 – Revelations (Blue Note, 1995)
- Zen Food (Mack Avenue, 2010)
- The Messenger (Mack Avenue, 2012)
- Duets with Stanley Jordan (Mack Avenue, 2015)
- East West Time Line (Mack Avenue, 2017)

=== As sideman ===
- Art Blakey and the Jazz Messengers, Live at Montreux and Northsea (Timeless, 1980)
- Steve Arrington, Steve Arrington's Hall Of Fame, Vol.1 (Atlantic, 1983)
- The Young Lions (Elektra Musician, 1983)
- Urszula Dudziak, Sorrow Is Not Forever... But Love Is (Keytone, 1983)
- James Williams, Alter Ego (Sunnyside, 1984)
- Oliver Lake, Expandable Language (Black Saint, 1985)
- Billy Hart, Oshumare (Gramavision, 1985)
- Meredith D'Ambrosio, It's Your Dance (Sunnyside, 1985)
- James Williams, Progress Report (Sunnyside, 1985)
- The Mike Gibbs Orchestra, Big Music (Venture, 1988)
- Billy Hart, Rah (Gramavision, 1988)
- Robin Eubanks, Different Perspectives (JMT, 1989)
- Dave Holland, Extensions (ECM, 1989)
- Greg Osby, Season of Renewal (JMT, 1990)
- Gary Thomas, While the Gate Is Open (JMT, 1990)
- Gary Thomas, The Kold Kage (JMT, 1991)
- Robin Eubanks, Karma (JMT, 1991)
- Kirk Lightsey, From Kirk to Nat (Criss Cross Jazz, 1991)
- Steve Coleman, Rhythm in Mind (Novus, 1992)
- Harold Mabern, The Leading Man (DIW, 1993)
- Ralph Moore, Round Trip (Reservoir, 1985 [1987])
- Jean-Luc Ponty, No Absolute Time (Atlantic, 1993)
- Adam Rudolph's Moving Pictures, Skyway (Soul Note, 1994)
- Mino Cinelu, World Trio (1995)
- Dianne Reeves, That Day (Blue Note, 1997)
- Terri Lyne Carrington, Jazz Is a Spirit (ACT, 2002)
- Carmen Lundy, Moment to Moment (Afrasia, 2007)
- Dave Holland, Prism (Okeh/Dare2, 2013)
- Orrin Evans, #knowingishalfthebattle (Smoke Sessions, 2017)
- Dave Holland, Another Land (Edition, 2021)

== See also ==
- Jazz Bridge

Media offices
Preceded by Branford Marsalis	The Tonight Show bandleader 1995–2009	Succeeded by Max Weinberg
Preceded by Max Weinberg	The Tonight Show bandleader 2010	Succeeded by Rickey Minor
