= Rickey Minor =

American bassist and composer (born 1957)

- Born: 1957 (age 68–69); Monroe, Louisiana, U.S.
- Genres: Jazz, pop, R&B, rock, Soul
- Occupations: music director, composer, music producer
- Instruments: Bass, keyboards
- Years active: 1985–present
- Website: www.rickeyminorentertainment.com

Rickey Minor (born 1957) is an American bass player, music director, composer and music producer. He was the musical director and bandleader on The Tonight Show with Jay Leno from 2010 to 2014, taking over after Kevin Eubanks left.

Minor worked as musical director for American Idol.

Minor has served as musical director for numerous superstar tours, including Whitney Houston, Christina Aguilera, Ray Charles, Alicia Keys and Beyoncé and for television productions, including the Grammy Awards, the NAACP Image Awards and the Super Bowl. He has received twelve Primetime Emmy Award nominations for Outstanding Music Direction, winning two of them, for Taking the Stage: African American Music and Stories That Changed America (2017) and The Kennedy Center Honors (2020).
