= Robin Eubanks =

American jazz trombonist (born 1955)

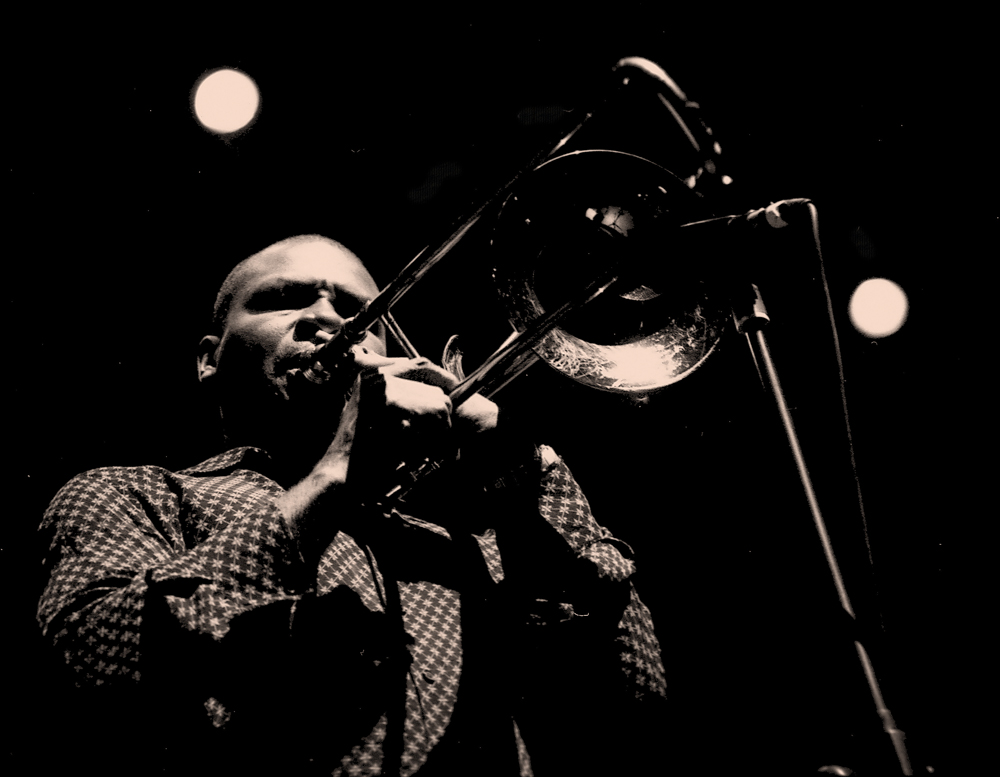
- Robin Eubanks at the Torino Jazz Festival in 2007

Background information
- Born: October 25, 1955 (age 70); Philadelphia, Pennsylvania, U.S.
- Genres: Jazz
- Occupation: Musician
- Instrument: Trombone

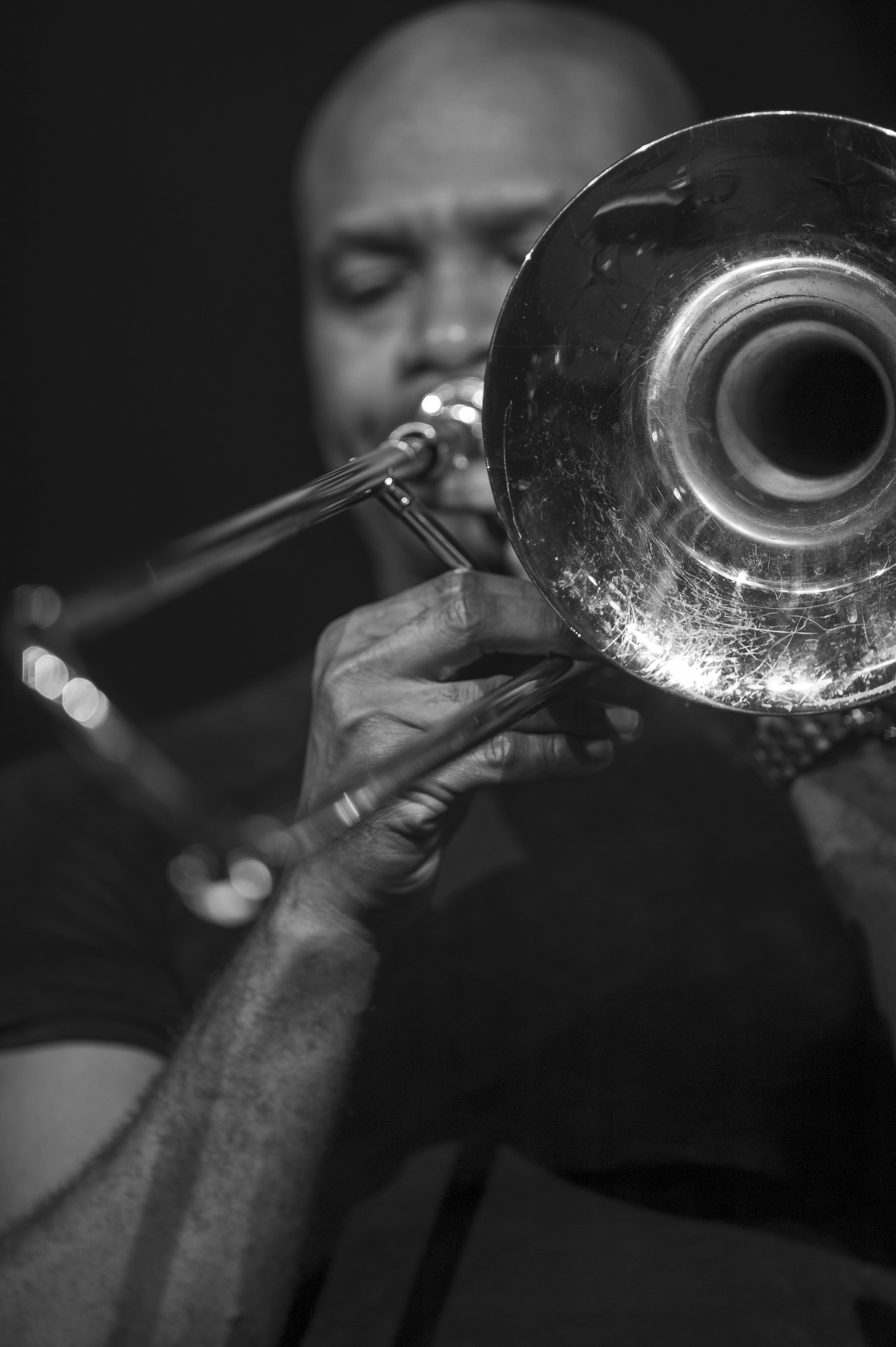
Robin Eubanks, TD Canada Trust Toronto Jazz Festival

Robin Eubanks (born October 25, 1955) is an American jazz and jazz fusion slide trombonist, the brother of guitarist Kevin Eubanks and trumpeter Duane Eubanks. Younger brother Shane Eubanks, twin to Duane Eubanks, is a DJ. His uncles are jazz pianist Ray Bryant and bassist Tommy Bryant. His mother, Vera Eubanks, was famed pianist Kenny Barron's first piano teacher.

== Biography ==
Robin Eubanks was born on October 25, 1955, in Philadelphia. After graduating cum laude from the University of the Arts, he moved to New York City where he first appeared on the jazz scene in the early 1980s. He played with Slide Hampton, Sun Ra, and Stevie Wonder. Eubanks was the musical director for jazz drummer Art Blakey and the Jazz Messengers. He also was a member of jazz drummer Elvin Jones’ Jazz Machine. He was a contributor on fellow jazz trombonist Steve Turre's 2003 release One4J: Paying Homage to J.J. Johnson. Eubanks has also released several albums as a bandleader.

He played for 15 years in double bassist Dave Holland's quintet, sextet, octet and big band. J.J. Johnson recommended Eubanks for the position at the Oberlin Conservatory in Ohio, where he taught for 20 years as a tenured professor of Jazz Trombone and Jazz Composition. He has also taught at New England Conservatory and Berklee College of Music in Boston. He was a member in the all-star group the SFJAZZ Collective for 10 years 2008-2019. His notable students include trombonist Andy Hunter of the WDR Big Band.

Robin is one of the pioneers of M-Base. He has appeared on numerous television shows and specials, including The Tonight Show, Saturday Night Live and The Grammys. He also pioneered the use of electronic effects with the trombone.

Robin is a frequent lecturer, guest soloist and clinician at various colleges and universities in the U.S. and around the world.

Eubanks was voted #1 Trombonist by Down Beat magazine and Jazz Times.

== Discography ==
=== As leader ===
- Different Perspectives (JMT, 1988)
- Dedication (JMT, 1989) - with Steve Turre
- Karma (JMT, 1990)
- Mental Images (JMT, 1994)
- Wake Up Call (Sirocco Jazz, 1997)
- Robin Eubanks Sextet: 4: JJ / Slide / Curtis and Al (TCB, 1998)
- Mental Images: Get 2 It (REM, 2001)
- EB3 Live Vol. 1 (CD and DVD, RKM, 2007)
- Robin Eubanks and Mental Images: Klassik RocK Vol. 1 (Artistshare, 2014)
- Robin Eubanks and the Mass Line Big Band: More Than Meets The Ear (Artistshare, 2015)

=== As sideman ===
With Geri Allen

- Open on All Sides in the Middle (Minor Music, 1987)
- The Gathering (Verve, 1998)

With Art Blakey

- Not Yet (Soul Note, 1988)
- I Get a Kick Out of Bu (Soul Note, 1988)

With Steve Coleman

- World Expansion (JMT, 1987)

With Sonny Fortune

- A Better Understanding (Blue Note, 1995)

With Craig Handy

- Split Second Timing (Arabesque, 1992)
- Reflections in Change (Sirocco Music, 1999)

With Joe Henderson

- Big Band (1996)

With Dave Holland

- The Razor's Edge (ECM, 1987)
- Points of View (ECM, 1998)
- Prime Directive (ECM, 1999)
- What Goes Around (ECM, 2002)
- Not for Nothin' (ECM, 2001)
- Extended Play: Live at Birdland (ECM, 2003)
- Pathways (Dare2, 2010)

With Ronald Shannon Jackson

- Decode Yourself (Island, 1985)

With Elvin Jones

- The Truth: Heard Live at the Blue Note (Half Note, 1999)

With Bobby Previte

- Weather Clear, Track Fast (Enja, 1991)
- Slay the Suitors (Avant, 1993)
- Hue and Cry (Enja, 1993)

With Hank Roberts

- Black Pastels (JMT, 1988)

With Herb Robertson

- Shades of Bud Powell (JMT, 1988)

With others

- Betty Carter: The Music Never Stops (Blue Engine, 2019)
- Kenny Drew: Follow the Spirit (Sirocco Jazz, 2000)
- Bill Hardman: What's Up (SteepleChase, 1989)
- Andrew Hill: But Not Farewell (Blue Note, 1990)
- Abdullah Ibrahim: Good News from Africa: Portrait (Enja, 1990)
- Joe Jackson: Symphony No. 1 (Sony Classical, 1999)
- J. J. Johnson: The Brass Orchestra (PolyGram, 1996)
- B.B. King: Live at the Apollo (MCA, 1990)
- Mingus Big Band: Essential Mingus Big Band (Dreyfus, 1996)
- Barbra Streisand: The Concert (Sony, 1994)
- Sun Ra: Other Side of the Sun (Universe, 1978)
- Superblue: Superblue 2 (Blue Note, 1989)
- Talking Heads: Naked (Sire, 1988)
- McCoy Tyner Big Band: Uptown/Downtown (Milestone, 1988)
- McCoy Tyner: Uptown/Downtown (WEA, 2000)
- The Uniphonics: Crawl (2010)
- Grover Washington Jr.: All My Tomorrows (Sony, 1994)
- Sadao Watanabe: Remembrance (Verve, 1999)
- Chip White: Harlem Sunset (Postcards, 1994)
