= David Gilmore =

American jazz guitarist

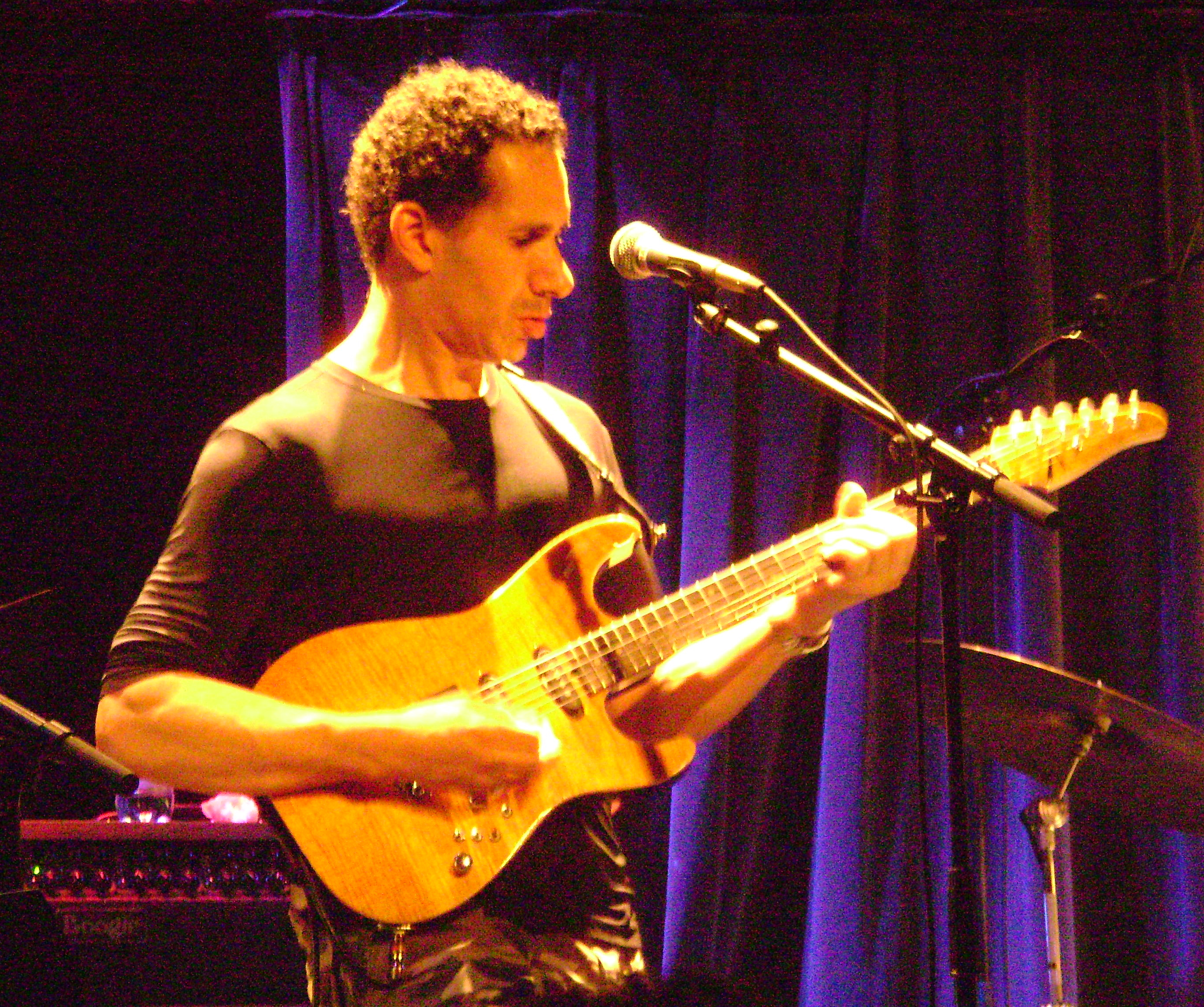
- Gilmore, playing with Cindy Blackman, in Treibhaus, Innsbruck 2011

Background information
- Born: Marvin David Gilmore; 5 February 1964 (age 62); Cambridge, Massachusetts United States
- Education: New York University
- Genres: Jazz, jazz fusion
- Occupations: Musician, songwriter, producer
- Instrument: Guitar
- Years active: 1987–present
- Labels: Criss Cross Jazz; RKM Music; Evolutionary Music; Kashka Music
- Website: davidgilmore.net

David Gilmore (born 5 February 1964) is an American jazz guitarist.

== Biography ==
Gilmore, was born Marvin David Gilmore in Cambridge, Massachusetts on 5 February 1964 and studied at New York University with multi-instrumentalist Joe Lovano and pianist and composer Jim McNeely.

In 1987, he began working professionally with the M-Base Collective and Ronald Shannon Jackson. In the 1990s, he was a member of the jazz fusion band Lost Tribe. In 1995, he became a member of Wayne Shorter's band. With his brother Marque Gilmore, Matt Garrison, and Aref Durvesh, he recorded Ritualism in 2001. With Christian McBride, Jeff "Tain" Watts, and Ravi Coltrane he recorded Unified Presence. Gilmore was the sole composer on all but one song and also served as the producer of the album.

He has worked with Muhal Richard Abrams, Geri Allen, Cindy Blackman Santana, Ron Blake, Randy Brecker, Don Byron, Uri Caine, Steve Coleman, Alice Coltrane, Jack DeJohnette, Dave Douglas, Melissa Etheridge, Robin Eubanks, Rachelle Ferrell, Trilok Gurtu, Isaac Hayes, Graham Haynes, Cyndi Lauper, Branford Marsalis, Wynton Marsalis, Meshell Ndegeocello, Joan Osborne, Greg Osby, Lonnie Plaxico, Dianne Reeves, Sam Rivers, David Sanborn, Boz Scaggs, Mavis Staples, Joss Stone, Steve Williamson, and Cassandra Wilson.

== Discography ==
=== As leader ===
- Ritualism (Kashka Music, 2000)
- Unified Presence (RKM Music, 2006)
- Numerology: Live at Jazz Standard (Evolutionary Music, 2012)
- Energies of Change (Evolutionary Music, 2015)
- Transitions (Criss Cross, 2017)
- From Here to Here (Criss Cross, 2020)

=== As sideman ===
With Don Byron

- No-vibe Zone (Knitting Factory, 1996)
- Bug Music (Nonesuch, 1996)
- Nu Blaxploitation (Capitol, 1998)
- You Are #6 (Blue Note, 2001)
- Do the Boomerang (Blue Note, 2006)

With Steve Coleman

- Sine Die (Pangaea, 1988)
- Cipher Syntax (JMT, 1989)
- Rhythm People (The Resurrection of Creative Black Civilization) (RCA Novus, 1990)
- Black Science (RCA/Novus, 1991)
- Drop Kick (RCA/Novus, 1992)
- The Tao of Mad Phat (RCA/Novus, 1993)
- Genesis & the Opening of the Way (BMG/RCA Victor, 1997)
- The Ascension to Light (BMG, 2001)

With others

- Muhal Richard Abrams, Think All, Focus One (Black Saint, 1995)
- Aka Moon, Guitars (W.E.R.F., 2002)
- Aka Moon, Invisible Moon (Carbon 7, 2001)
- Ralph Alessi, This Against That (RKM Music, 2002)
- Ron Blake, Lest We Forget (Mack Avenue, 2003)
- Ron Blake, Sonic Tonic (Mack Avenue, 2005)
- Uri Caine, Love Fugue: Robert Schumann (Winter & Winter, 2000)
- Uri Caine, Gustav Mahler: Dark Flame (Winter & Winter, 2003)
- Ann Hampton Callaway, Blues in the Night (Telarc, 2006)
- Vincent Chancey, Welcome Mr. Chancey (In+Out 1993)
- Theo Croker, Afro Physicist (DDB, Okeh 2014)
- Wayne Escoffery, The Humble Warrior (Smoke Sessions 2020)
- Trilok Gurtu, Believe (CMP, 1994)
- Trilok Gurtu, Bad Habits Die Hard (CMP, 1996)
- Graham Haynes, What Time It Be! (Muse, 1991)
- Mike Holober, Thought Trains (Sons of Sound, 2004)
- Cary Hudson, The Phoenix (Glitterhouse, 2002)
- Brad Jones, Uncivilized Poise (Knitting Factory, 1999)
- Boris Kozlov, Conversations at the Well (Criss Cross, 2016)
- Carolyn Leonhart, Steal the Moon (Sunnyside, 2000)
- M-Base, Anatomy of a Groove (DIW, 1992)
- Rudresh Mahanthappa, Samdhi (ACT, 2011)
- Christian McBride, Sci-Fi (Verve, 2000)
- Christian McBride, Vertical Vision (Warner Bros., 2002)
- Monday Michiru, Episodes in Color (SAR, 2002)
- Roy Nathanson, Fire at Keaton's Bar & Grill (Six Degrees, 2000)
- Meshell Ndegeocello, The World Has Made Me the Man of My Dreams (Bismillah, 2007)
- Lonnie Plaxico, Iridescence (Muse, 1991)
- Lonnie Plaxico, Short Takes (Muse, 1992)
- Renee Rosnes, Life on Earth (Blue Note, 2001)
- Adam Rudolph, Turning Towards the Light (Cuneiform, 2015)
- Wayne Shorter, High Life (Verve, 1995)
- Omar Sosa, Across the Divide (Half Note, 2009)
- Jeff "Tain" Watts, Detained at the Blue Note (Half Note, 2004)
- Beau Williams, Bodacious! (Funkytowngrooves, 2011)
- Steve Williamson, A Waltz for Grace (Verve, 1990)
- Steve Williamson, Rhyme Time (Verve, 1991)
- Cassandra Wilson, Jumpworld (JMT, 1990)
- Cristina Zavalloni, The Soul Factor (Via Veneto, 2014)
- Black Lives, Generation To Generation (Jammin' Colors, 2022)
- Black Lives, People Of Earth (Jammin' Colors, 2024)
