= Dream of the Elders =

Studio album by the Dave Holland Quartet
- Released: January 1996
- Recorded: March 1995
- Studio: Power Station, New York City
- Genre: Post-bop
- Length: 77:04
- Label: ECM; ECM 1572
- Producer: Manfred Eicher

Dave Holland chronology
Ones All (1993)	Dream of the Elders (1996)	Points of View (1998)

Dave Holland Quartet chronology
Extensions (1990)	Dream of the Elders (1996)	Prism (2013)

Professional ratings
Review scores
Source	Rating
AllMusic	4/5 stars
Tom Hull	B+
The Penguin Guide to Jazz Recordings	3.5/4 stars
The Rolling Stone Jazz & Blues Album Guide	4.5/5 stars

Dream of the Elders is a studio album by the British jazz bassist Dave Holland and his quartet, featuring saxophonist Eric Person, vibraphonist Steve Nelson and drummer Gene Jackson.

== Background ==
Like Holland's previous two ECM releases, Triplicate and Extensions, this album was recorded following the dissolving of his first band (Steve Coleman, Robin Eubanks, Kenny Wheeler, and Marvin "Smitty" Smith). Dream of the Elders has influenced Holland's future releases in several ways. It was his first release to feature vibraphonist Steve Nelson, who then went on to join Holland's second quintet, formed following the Dream of the Elders session. Additionally, four of the tunes introduced on the album ("Lazy Snake", "Claressence", "Equality" and "Ebb & Flo") have been revisited by Holland on future releases, albeit in re-arranged versions.

== Reception ==
Bill Kahlklaase, of The New Mexican, stated: "1995’s magnificent Dream of the Elders, proved the bassist adept at bringing together superlative instrumentalists to play music that ranged between tightly arranged passages and bursts of improvisational freedom."

== Track listing ==
All music is composed by Dave Holland

No.	Title	Lyrics	Length
1.	"The Winding Way"		11:57
2.	"Lazy Snake"		12:28
3.	"Claressence"		7:29
4.	"Equality" (with Cassandra Wilson)	Maya Angelou	7:12
5.	"Ebb & Flo"		12:02
6.	"Dream of the Elders"		11:10
7.	"Second Thoughts"		8:06
8.	"Equality" (Instrumental)		6:40
Total length:			1:17:04

== Personnel ==
- Eric Person – alto saxophone, soprano saxophone
- Steve Nelson – vibraphone
- Dave Holland – double bass
- Gene Jackson – drums
- Cassandra Wilson – vocals ("Equality" only)
