= A Waltz for Grace =

Studio album by Steve Williamson
- Released: 1990
- Studio: Westside Studios, London and Systems Two Studios, New York
- Genre: Jazz
- Length: 58:35
- Label: Verve
- Producer: Steve Coleman, Glenn Skinner, Steve Williamson

Steve Williamson chronology
A Waltz for Grace (1990)	Rhyme Time (That Fuss Was Us) (1991)

A Waltz for Grace is the debut album by English saxophonist Steve Williamson, released on the Verve label in 1990.

== Reception ==
Professional ratings
Review scores
Source	Rating
AllMusic	3/5 stars
The Penguin Guide to Jazz	3.5/4 stars

The Los Angeles Times stated that "U.S.-session bassist Lonnie Plaxico and drummer Mark Mondesir ... provide inventive rhythmic stimulus which Williamson uses for demonstrations of reserve as well as gut-busting enthusiasm."

AllMusic awarded the album with 3 stars and its review by Scott Yanow states: "At 25, Williamson displayed an original tenor sound and, although some of his soloing is in the Greg Osby/Gary Thomas 'M-Base' mode, he was not limited to that abstract style of improvising". The Penguin Guide review says: "What is lastingly impressive about A Waltz for Grace is its tremendous rhythmic variety. 'Groove Thang' (a UK recorded soprano-percussion duet) leads directly into the fuller-sounding 'Synthesis' from New York, both largely dependent on Williamson's ability to balance a line over a jolting, staccato pulse".

== Track listing ==
All compositions by Steve Williamson except where noted.

1. "Down (Slang)" – 3:18
2. "Awakening" – 4:35
3. "Visions" (Stevie Wonder) – 4:29
4. "A Waltz for Grace" – 4:15
5. "Mandy's Mood" – 5:49
6. "Soon Come" – 4:14
7. "Straight Ahead" – 4:45
8. "Mandela" – 4:29
9. "Groove Thang" – 1:42
10. "Synthesis" – 4:59
11. "Hummingbird" – 5:41
12. "How High the Bird" – 4:22
13. "Words Within Words" – 5:01

== Personnel ==
- Steve Williamson – all saxophones
- Mark Mondesir – drums
- Lonnie Plaxico – bass
- Gary Crosby – bass
- Dave Gilmore – guitar
- Hawi Gondwe – guitar
- Julian Joseph – piano
- Abbey Lincoln – vocals on "A Waltz for Grace"
