= Turning Point (Kevin Eubanks album) =

Studio album by Kevin Eubanks
- Released: 1992
- Recorded: December 1991, January 1992
- Genre: Jazz
- Label: Blue Note
- Producer: Kevin Eubanks

Kevin Eubanks chronology
| Promise of Tomorrow (1990) | Turning Point (1992) | Spirit Talk (1993) |

Turning Point is an album by the American musician Kevin Eubanks, released in 1992. Its release coincided with the beginning of his tenure on The Tonight Show with Jay Leno. The album peaked in the top five on Billboard's Contemporary Jazz Albums chart.

== Production ==
Turning Point was recorded in December 1991 and January 1992. Eubanks was backed by two quartets, which included Dave Holland and Charnett Moffett on bass, Marvin "Smitty" Smith and Mark Mondesir on drums, and Kent Jordan on alto flute. The album begins with a three-part suite. "Lingering Destiny" is a solo acoustic guitar composition.

== Critical reception ==
Professional ratings
Review scores
| Source | Rating |
|---|---|
| All Music Guide to Jazz | 5/5 stars |
| Detroit Free Press | 3/4 stars |
| The Encyclopedia of Popular Music | 3/5 stars |
| The Indianapolis Star | 4/4 stars |
| MusicHound Jazz: The Essential Album Guide | 3.5/5 stars |
| The News & Observer | 3/4 stars |
| The Penguin Guide to Jazz on CD, LP & Cassette | 3/4 stars |
| The Philadelphia Inquirer | 3/4 stars |
| The Rolling Stone Jazz & Blues Album Guide | 3.5/5 stars |

Many critics considered Turning Point to be a less fusion- and pop-oriented album than Eubanks's previous work, a conclusion that annoyed the musician.

The Indianapolis Star stated that "Eubanks has lots of facility, but he husbands his resources wisely... His playing is angular, crisply accented and loaded with funky hooks". The Gazette advised, "Imagine Wes Montgomery on speed, or John McLaughlin with soul"; the paper later listed Turning Point as one of the best jazz albums of 1992. The Ottawa Citizen said, "On the pivotal 'Spiral Ways' the trio builds an ascending, tension-filled Eubanks melody to a Mahavishnu-style boil, with Holland and Smith prodding the guitarist to the finest playing of his career."

The Birmingham Post praised the "exotic soundscapes and driving rhythms." LA Weekly noted that Eubanks's "filing cabinet of technique [allows] him to be funky ratchet or classical gas." The Philadelphia Inquirer said that Eubanks "endows 'Colors of One' with a sweet, dreamy sense of drift."

== Track listing ==
| No. | Title | Length |
|---|---|---|
| 1. | "Turning Point (Part I)" |
| 2. | "Aftermath (Part II)" |
| 3. | "Initiation (Part III)" |
| 4. | "New World Order" |
| 5. | "Colors of One" |
| 6. | "Spiral Days" |
| 7. | "Freedom Child" |
| 8. | "On My Way to Paradise" |
| 9. | "Lingering Destiny" |
