= Extensions (Dave Holland album) =

Studio album by the Dave Holland Quartet
- Released: 1990
- Recorded: September 1989
- Studio: Power Station, New York City
- Genre: Post-bop, avant-garde jazz
- Length: 59:01
- Label: ECM; ECM 1410
- Producer: Manfred Eicher

Dave Holland chronology
The Oracle (1989)	Extensions (1990)	Question and Answer (1990)

Dave Holland Quartet chronology
Conference of the Birds (1972)	Extensions (1990)	Dream of the Elders (1996)

Extensions is an album by the Dave Holland Quartet, recorded in September 1989 and released on ECM the following year—Holland's eight album for the label. The quartet features former Dave Holland Quintet members saxophonist Steve Coleman and drummer Marvin "Smitty" Smith alongside guitarist Kevin Eubanks, in his first appearance on a Holland record. All four musicians came together again in a studio for Coleman's Rhythm in Mind in an expanded line-up. Holland would rerecord the composition "Processional" for his sextet album Pass It On in 2008.

== Reception ==
Professional ratings
Review scores
Source	Rating
AllMusic	4/5 stars
DownBeat	5/5 stars
Tom Hull	B+
The Penguin Guide to Jazz on CD	2.5/4 stars
The Rolling Stone Jazz & Blues Album Guide	4/5 stars

The AllMusic review by Brian Olewnick called the album a "tight and enjoyable quartet date," writing, "One of his better albums from this period, Extensions should please any Holland fan, and is an agreeable and non-threatening jumping in point for the curious." Extensions was voted Album of the Year (1989) by DownBeat.

== Track listing ==
No.	Title	Writer(s)	Length
1.	"Nemesis"	Kevin Eubanks	11:31
2.	"Processional"	Dave Holland	7:16
3.	"Black Hole"	Steve Coleman	10:10
4.	"The Oracle"	Holland	14:32
5.	"101° Fahrenheit (Slow Meltdown)"	Coleman	4:50
6.	"Color of Mind"	Eubanks	10:11

== Personnel ==
=== Dave Holland Quartet ===
- Steve Coleman – alto saxophone
- Kevin Eubanks – electric guitar
- Dave Holland – double bass
- Marvin "Smitty" Smith – drums
