= Cipher Syntax =

Studio album by Strata Institute
- Released: 1989
- Recorded: March–April 1988
- Studio: Systems Two, Brooklyn, New York
- Genre: Jazz
- Length: 51:49
- Label: JMT; JMT 834 425
- Producer: Greg Osby & Steve Coleman

Greg Osby chronology
| Mindgames (1988) | Cipher Syntax (1989) | Season of Renewal (1990) |

Steve Coleman chronology
| Sine Die (1988) | Cipher Syntax (1989) | Rhythm People (1990) |

Cipher Syntax is an album by Strata Institute, an M-Base group led by saxophonists Greg Osby and Steve Coleman, recorded in 1988 and released on the JMT label.

== Reception ==
The AllMusic review by Michael G. Nastos states, "An acquired taste, but still excellent".

Professional ratings
Review scores
| Source | Rating |
|---|---|
| AllMusic | 4/5 stars |

== Track listing ==
All compositions by Steve Coleman except as indicated

1. "Slang" - 9:18
2. "Bed Stuy" - 7:08
3. "Turn of Events" (Greg Osby) - 3:23
4. "Decrepidus" (Osby) - 3:49
5. "Ihgnat Down" (Strata Institute) - 2:23
6. "Micro-Move" - 4:17
7. "Wild" - 3:04
8. "Humantic" (Osby) - 7:19
9. "Abacus" - 7:28
10. "Ihgnat" (Strata Institute) - 3:27

== Personnel ==
- Steve Coleman - alto saxophone
- Greg Osby - alto saxophone, soprano saxophone
- David Gilmore - electric guitar (tracks 1–3, 5 & 8–10)
- Bob Hurst - acoustic bass (tracks 1–5 & 7–10)
- Marvin "Smitty" Smith (tracks 1–3, 5 & 7–10), Tani Tabbal (tracks 1, 4, 8 & 9) - drums
