= Julian Joseph =

British jazz musician, bandleader, and broadcaster (born 1966)

- Born: Julian Raphael Nathaniel Joseph; 11 May 1966 (age 60); London, United Kingdom
- Genre: Jazz
- Occupations: Musician, composer, arranger, broadcaster
- Instrument: Piano
- Label: East West
- Website: www.julianjoseph.com

Julian Raphael Nathaniel Joseph OBE (born 11 May 1966) is a British jazz pianist, bandleader, composer, arranger, and broadcaster. He has worked solo, in his big band, trio, quartet, forum project band or electric band.

== Biography ==
Joseph was born in London and attended Allfarthing Primary School and Spencer Park Secondary School in Wandsworth. He graduated in composition from Berklee College of Music in 1989.

Joseph works in both contemporary and traditional situations with his music. He is also active in jazz education helping to form the jazz syllabus for the Associated Board of the Royal Schools of Music in Great Britain.

Starting with his first album The Language of Truth in 1991, Joseph has six albums, one single, and one soundtrack to his credit, and has focused on live performance, composing, broadcasting and teaching. He performed at the 2003 London Jazz Festival and also hosts several radio shows on BBC Radio 3, including Jazz Line-up and Jazz Legends. He has also made two jazz television series for Meridian, a jazz series for Sky TV's Artsworld Channel and the documentary A Festival of Jazz Piano (2006) for BBC Television in Wales directed by Celia Lowenstein.

In September 2010, Joseph was interviewed by Bruce Lindsay, a jazz critic from All About Jazz, who wrote: "Julian Joseph is something of a jazz master of all trades." October that year, Joseph was presented with a BASCA Gold Badge Award in merit for his unique contribution to music.

Joseph founded the Julian Joseph Jazz Academy in January 2013 in London. The Academy encourages young musicians in the development of jazz technique and understanding. Tutors include Tony Kofi and Byron Wallen.

Joseph is also a trustee and vice-president of the National Youth Jazz Collective.

In the 2018 Queen's Birthday Honours list, he was appointed an OBE for services to music.

== Discography ==
=== As leader/co-leader ===
Year recorded	Title	Label	Notes
1991	The Language of Truth	East West	With Jean Toussaint (tenor sax), Alec Dankworth (bass), Mark Mondesir (drums), Sharon Musgrave (vocals)
1994?	Reality	East West	With Peter King (alto sax), Jean Toussaint (tenor sax), Charnett Moffett and Wayne Batchelor (bass), Mark Mondesir (drums)
1994	In Concert at the Wigmore Hall	East West	With Eddie Daniels (clarinet), Johnny Griffin (tenor sax), Jason Rebello (piano), Alec Dankworth (bass); in concert
1996?	Universal Traveller	East West	With Reginald Veal (bass), Mark Mondesir (drums)
2009	Dance of the Three Legged Elephants	Signum	Duo, co-led with Matthew Barley (cello)
2012	Julian Joseph Live at the Vortex in London	ASC	Solo piano; in concert

=== Notable albums as sideman ===
Year	Leader	Title
1991	Guy Barker	Isn't It?
2004	Billy Cobham	Art of Five
2002	George Coleman	Blues Inside Out
1994	Chico Freeman	The Unspoken Word
2005	Emilíana Torrini	Fisherman's Woman
1999	Don Braden	Fire Within
1998	Adam F	Music in My Mind
1996	Nina Hagen	BeeHappy
1996	Jean Toussaint	Nazaire Who's Blues
1992	Courtney Pine	Closer to Home
1992	Courtney Pine	To the Eyes of Creation
1988	Courtney Pine	Destiny's Song + the Image of Pursuance
1986	Courtney Pine	Journey to the Urge Within
1990	Steve Williamson	A Waltz for Grace

== See also ==
- Jazz Warriors
