= Phase Space (album) =

Studio album by Steve Coleman and Dave Holland
- Released: 1992
- Recorded: January 1991
- Studios: Systems Two (Brooklyn, New York)
- Genre: Jazz
- Length: 59:46
- Labels: DIW; DIW 865
- Producers: Dave Holland; Steve Coleman

Dave Holland chronology
Question and Answer (1990)	Phase Space (1992)	Ones All (1995)

Steve Coleman chronology
Black Science (1990)	Phase Space (1991)	Rhythm in Mind (1991)

Phase Space is an album of duets by saxophonist Steve Coleman and bassist Dave Holland recorded in January 1991 and released on the Japanese DIW label the following year.

== Reception ==
The AllMusic review by Don Snowden states, "No grandstanding, no coasting—just two masterful musicians playing together and taking the listener along for the ride."

Professional ratings
Review scores
Source	Rating
AllMusic	4/5 stars

== Track listing ==
All tracks are written by Steve Coleman except as indicated.

No.	Title	Writer(s)	Length
1.	"Ah-Leu-Cha"	Charlie Parker	7:57
2.	"Dream of the Elders"	Dave Holland	7:23
3.	"Syzygy"		5:07
4.	"Straight Ahead"	Mal Waldron	8:27
5.	"In Brief"		5:28
6.	"Prescience"		6:27
7.	"Cud Ba-Rith"		4:30
8.	"Little Girl I'll Miss You"	Bunky Green	7:38
9.	"See Saw"	Holland	6:31

== Personnel ==
- Steve Coleman – alto saxophone
- Dave Holland – acoustic bass

=== Production ===
- Steve Coleman – producer, mixing
- Dave Holland – producer, mixing
- Louis Coleman – assistant producer
- Joe Marciano – recording, mixing
- Digital House (New York, NY) – mastering location
- Kazunori Sugiyama – project coordinator
- DIW Design Room – cover design
- Toni L. Taylor – cover art
- Hal Wilson – layout
