= Mark Mondesir =

English jazz drummer

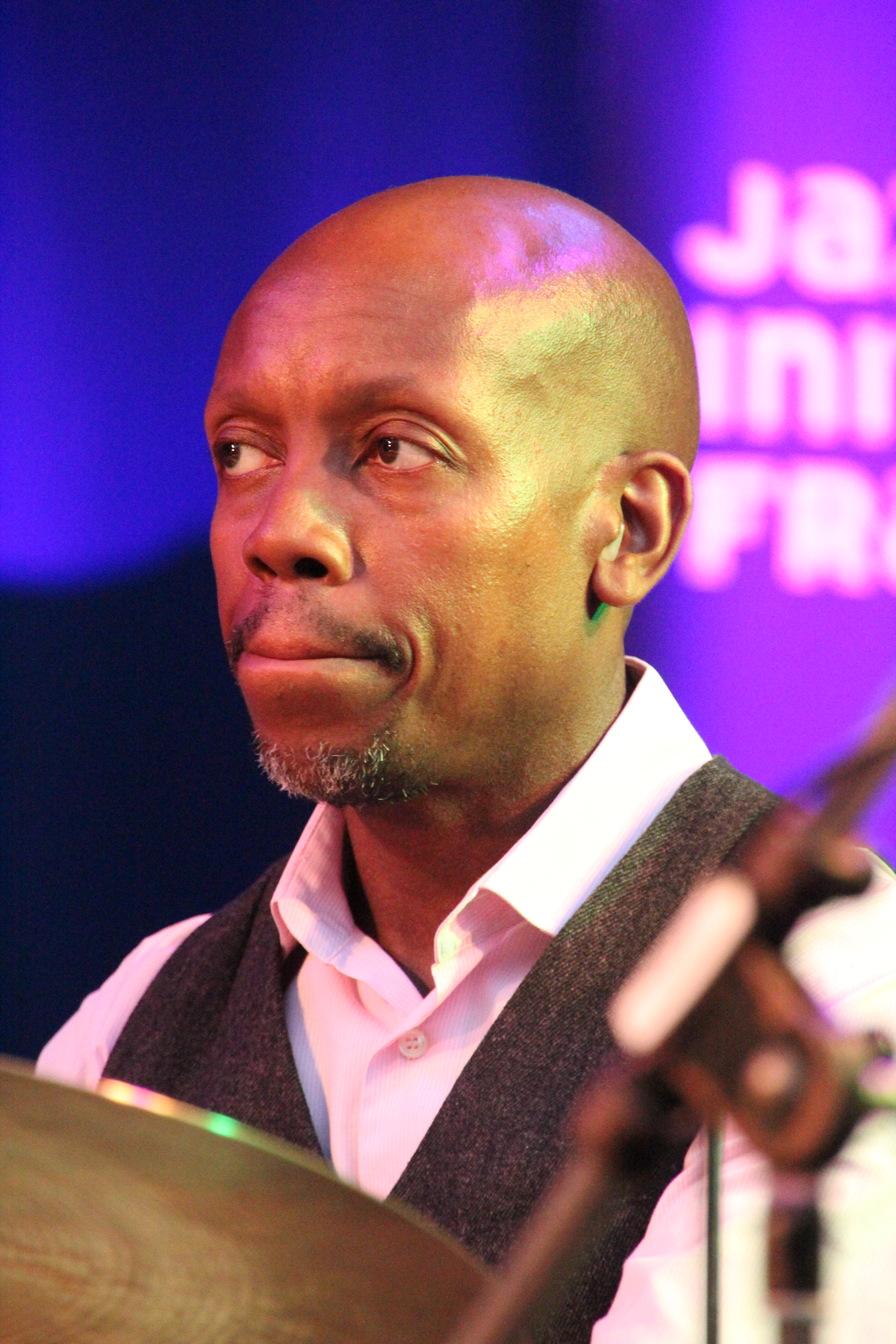
- Mondesir in 2018
- Born: 12 December 1964 (age 60); Stepney, London, England
- Occupation: Jazz drummer
- Relatives: Michael Mondesir (brother)

Mark Mondesir (born 12 December 1964) is an English jazz drummer. His brother, Michael Mondesir, is a bass guitarist.

== Career ==
Mondesir was born in Stepney, London, on 12 December 1964.

Mondesir began his career in 1984 as part of Ian Carr's workshops at the Weekend Arts Center. Mondesir worked with Courtney Pine between 1985 and 1989 and recorded with Kevin Eubanks in 1991.

In the 1990s, Mondesir accompanied musicians who were visiting the UK; these included Art Farmer, Hermeto Pascoal and John Scofield. Mondesir played with Pee Wee Ellis's Assembly in 1996. In the 1990s and early 2000s, he was part of bands led by pianist Julian Joseph.

Mondesir was part of guitarist John McLaughlin's 4th Dimension Band for their To the One album, which was recorded in 2009. The band was also featured on the Live @ Belgrade DVD from 2008. Mondesir left the band in 2010.

== Discography ==
=== As sideman ===
With Michael Gibbs

- Nonsequence (Provocateur, 2001)
- Here's a Song for You (Fuzzy Moon, 2011)
- Back in the Days (Cuneiform, 2012)

With Julian Joseph

- The Language of Truth (EastWest, 1991)
- Reality (EastWest, 1993)
- Universal Traveller (EastWest, 1995)

With John McLaughlin

- The Promise (Verve, 1995)
- Industrial Zen (Verve, Universal 2006)
- To the One (Abstract Logix, 2010)

With Courtney Pine

- Journey to the Urge Within (Antilles, 1986)
- Traditions Beckoning (Antilles, 1988)
- Destiny's Song + the Image of Pursuance (Antilles, 1988)
- To the Eyes of Creation (4th & Broadway, 1992)

With others

- Toni Childs, The Woman's Boat (DGC, 1994)
- Barbara Dennerlein, Hot Stuff (Enja, 1991)
- Pee Wee Ellis, What You Like (Minor Music, 1997)
- Kevin Eubanks, Turning Point (Blue Note, 1992)
- Kevin Eubanks, Spirit Talk (Blue Note, 1993)
- Andy Hamilton, Silvershine (World Circuit, 1991)
- Jazz Warriors, Out of Many One People (Antilles, 1987)
- Rita Marcotulli, Basilicata Coast to Coast (Alice, 2011)
- Jean-Michel Pilc, Live at Iridium New York (Dreyfus, 2005)
- Jean-Michel Pilc, New Dreams (Dreyfus, 2007)
- Andy Sheppard, Steve Lodder, Moving Image (Verve, 1996)
- Jean Toussaint, What Goes Around (World Circuit, 1992)
- Jesse van Ruller, European Quintet (Blue Music, 1997)
- Steve Williamson, A Waltz for Grace (Verve, 1990)
- Steve Williamson, Rhyme Time (Verve, 1991)
