= The Oracle (Hank Jones album) =

Studio album by Hank Jones, Dave Holland and Billy Higgins
- Released: 1989 (UK); 1990 (France)
- Recorded: March–April 1989; NYC
- Genre: Jazz
- Length: 61:21
- Labels: EmArcy; 848 376
- Producer: Lee Townsend

Hank Jones chronology
Lazy Afternoon (1989)	The Oracle (1989)	Hank Jones with the Meridian String Quartet (1991)

Dave Holland chronology
Triplicate (1988)	The Oracle (1989)	Extensions (1989)

The Oracle is an album by pianist Hank Jones, bassist Dave Holland and drummer Billy Higgins recorded in 1989 for the EmArcy label.

== Reception ==
Professional ratings
Review scores
Source	Rating
Allmusic	4/5 stars
The Penguin Guide to Jazz	4/4 stars
Downbeat	3.5/5 stars

Allmusic awarded the album 4 stars, stating: "the interplay between the three musicians is quite impressive". The Penguin Guide to Jazz described it in 1992 as "a small masterpiece, certainly Jones's most inventive and adventurous album for a great many years".

John McDonough wrote in Downbeat, "Holland's time signatures on The Oracle tend to be a bit more exotic, which is also consistent with mostly original material. His solo work overall has a dexterous tension and push, with his turn on “Trane Connections" possessing tremendous power . . . Holland also brings three of his own compositions along. His “Blues For CM" is both lush and earthy in Jones' hands, as is Billy Strayhorn's 1966 'Blood Count'. And Higgins' snare-and-cymbal counterpoint on 'Trane' is beautifully thought through. Jones' piano is consistently stimulating in such company". He assigned the album 3.5 stars.

== Track listing ==
All compositions by Dave Holland except as indicated

1. "Interface" (Hank Jones) - 6:43
2. "Beautiful Love" (Wayne King, Victor Young, Egbert Van Alstyne, Haven Gillespie) - 6:40
3. "The Oracle" - 6:45
4. "Blues for C.M." - 7:15
5. "Yesterdays" (Jerome Kern, Otto Harbach) - 6:20
6. "Blood Count" (Billy Strayhorn) - 8:30
7. "Maya's Dance" (Ray Drummond) - 5:48
8. "Jacob's Ladder" - 7:30 Bonus track on CD
9. "Trane Connections" (Jimmy Heath) - 5:50

== Personnel ==
- Hank Jones - piano
- Dave Holland - bass
- Billy Higgins - drums
