= Greg Osby and Sound Theatre =

Studio album by Greg Osby
- Released: 1987
- Recorded: May and June 1987
- Studio: Systems Two, Brooklyn, New York
- Genre: Jazz
- Length: 40:41
- Label: JMT; JMT 870 011
- Producer: Greg Osby and Stefan F. Winter

Greg Osby chronology
Greg Osby and Sound Theatre (1987)	Mindgames (1988)

Greg Osby and Sound Theatre is the debut studio album by saxophonist Greg Osby recorded in 1987 and released on the JMT label.

== Reception ==
The AllMusic review by Scott Yanow states, "The performances (mostly Osby originals) are complex, somewhat abrasive, and in the M-Base genre, swinging in their own funky fashion and following a different logic than bebop. Osby plays quite well, and the music grows in interest with each listen".

Professional ratings
Review scores
Source	Rating
AllMusic	4.5/5 stars
The Penguin Guide to Jazz Recordings	2.5/4 stars

== Track listing ==
All compositions by Greg Osby except as indicated

1. "You Big ..." - 5:07
2. "Daigoro" - 7:48
3. "Return to Now" - 7:51
4. "Shohachi Bushi/Oyamako Bushi" (Traditional) - 3:09
5. "Calculated Risk" - 3:52
6. "For Real Moments" (Geri Allen) - 7:12
7. "Gyrhythmitoid" - 5:32
8. "Knigrobade" - 6:34 Bonus track on CD

== Personnel ==
Band

- Greg Osby - alto saxophone, soprano saxophone
- Michele Rosewoman - piano, synthesizer (tracks 1–3 & 5–7)
- Kevin McNeal - electric guitar, acoustic guitar (tracks 1–3 & 5–7)
- Lonnie Plaxico - bass (tracks 1–3 & 5–8)
- Paul Samuels - drums, percussion (tracks 2–5 & 7)

Special guests

- Fusako Yoshida - koto (tracks 2 & 4)
- Terri Lyne Carrington - drums, percussion (tracks 4, 7 & 8)
- Haruko Nara - lyrics (track 2)
