= Question and Answer (album) =

Studio album by Pat Metheny with Dave Holland and Roy Haynes
- Released: 1990
- Recorded: December 21, 1989
- Studio: Power Station, New York City
- Genre: Jazz
- Length: 62:36
- Label: Geffen
- Producer: Gil Goldstein, Pat Metheny, David Oakes

Pat Metheny chronology
| Letter from Home (1989) | Question and Answer (1990) | Secret Story (1992) |

Dave Holland chronology
| Extensions (1990) | Question and Answer (1990) | Phase Space (1991) |

Professional ratings
Review scores
| Source | Rating |
|---|---|
| AllMusic | 4.5/5 stars |
| Encyclopedia of Popular Music | 4/5 stars |
| The Penguin Guide to Jazz Recordings | 3/4 stars |

Question and Answer is an album by guitarist Pat Metheny with acoustic bassist Dave Holland and drummer Roy Haynes. Metheny won the 1991 Grammy Award for Best Instrumental Composition for "Change of Heart".

== Track listing ==
All music is composed by Pat Metheny except where noted.

Side one:
| No. | Title | Writer(s) | Length |
|---|---|---|---|
| 1. | "Solar" | Miles Davis | 8:27 |
| 2. | "Question and Answer" | | 7:07 |
| 3. | "H&H" | | 6:51 |
| 4. | "Never Too Far Away" | | 5:52 |
| 5. | "Law Years" | Ornette Coleman | 6:51 |

Side two:
| No. | Title | Writer(s) | Length |
|---|---|---|---|
| 1. | "Change of Heart" | | 6:14 |
| 2. | "All the Things You Are" | Oscar Hammerstein II, Jerome Kern | 8:26 |
| 3. | "Old Folks" | Dedette Lee Hill, Willard Robison | 6:38 |
| 4. | "Three Flights Up" | | 6:10 |

== Personnel ==
- Pat Metheny – guitar, Synclavier on "Three Flights Up"
- Dave Holland – double bass
- Roy Haynes – drums

=== Technical personnel ===
- Pat Metheny – producer
- Gil Goldstein, David Oakes – associate producers
- David Sholemson – project coordinator
- Rob Eaton – recording, mixing
- Bob Ludwig – mastering at Masterdisk, NYC, USA
- Shed (8) – artwork, design
- Crhistofher Kehoe – photography

== Charts ==
| Year | Chart | Position |
|---|---|---|
| 1990 | Billboard Top Jazz Albums | 3 |
| 1990 | Billboard 200 | 154 |

== Awards ==
Grammy Awards

| Years | Winner | Title | Category |
|---|---|---|---|
| 1991 | Pat Metheny | "Change of Heart" | Grammy Award for Best Instrumental Composition |
