= On the Edge of Tomorrow =

Studio album by Steve Coleman and Five Elements
- Released: 1986
- Recorded: January 1986
- Studio: Systems Two, Brooklyn, N.Y.
- Genre: Jazz
- Length: 50:28
- Label: JMT; JMT 860005
- Producer: Stefan F. Winter

Steve Coleman chronology
Motherland Pulse (1985)	On the Edge of Tomorrow (1986)	World Expansion (1987)

On the Edge of Tomorrow is the second album by saxophonist Steve Coleman recorded in 1986 and released on the JMT label.

== Reception ==
The AllMusic review by Scott Yanow states, "Steve Coleman's second recording as a leader introduces his M-Base music in its prime. Essentially creative and avant-garde funk, the performances feature dense but coherent ensembles and crowded grooves ... Not for everyone's taste, this frequently exciting set hints at a future that has not yet come."

Professional ratings
Review scores
Source	Rating
AllMusic	4/5 stars
The Penguin Guide to Jazz Recordings	3/4 stars

== Track listing ==
All compositions by Steve Coleman except as indicated:

1. "Fire Revisited" – 4:48
2. "Fat Lay Back" – 2:12
3. "I'm Going Home" (Kevin Bruce Harris) – 2:58
4. "It Is Time" (Donna Russell, Graham Haynes) – 2:06
5. "(In Order to Perform) A More Perfect Union" – 6:56
6. "Little One I'll Miss You" (Abbey Lincoln, Bunky Green) – 4:33
7. "T-T-Tim" – 1:54
8. "Metaphysical Phunktion" (Kelvyn Bell) – 4:49
9. "Nine to Five" – 1:40
10. "Profile Man" – 2:54 Bonus track on CD
11. "Stone Bone (Can't Go Wrong)" – 6:41
12. "Almost There" (Harris) – 2:06
13. "Change the Guard" – 6:01

== Personnel ==
Musicians

- Steve Coleman – alto saxophone, arrangements (1, 2, 5–11, 13)
- Geri Allen – synthesizers
- Kelvyn Bell – electric guitars, arrangements (8)
- Kevin Bruce Harris – electric bass, arrangements (3, 12)
- Mark Johnson – drums (1, 2, 4–11, 13), percussion (3, 12)
- Marvin "Smitty" Smith – percussion (1, 2, 4–11, 13), drums (3, 12)
- Graham Haynes – trumpet, arrangements (4)

Vocalists

- Steve Coleman – vocals, backing vocals
- Kelvyn Bell – vocals
- Cassandra Wilson – vocals, backing vocals
- Kevin Bruce Harris – backing vocals
- Marvin "Smitty" Smith – backing vocals

=== Production ===
- Stefan F. Winter – producer
- Joe Marciano – engineer
- Steve Coleman – mixing
- Henry Riedel – mastering at Tonstudio Bauer (Ludwigsburg, Germany)
- Christine Paxmann – cover design
- Hans Georg Bieberstein – photography
