= Drop Kick (album) =

Studio album by Steve Coleman and Five Elements
- Released: 1992
- Recorded: January 1992
- Studio: Systems Two (Brooklyn, New York)
- Genre: Jazz
- Length: 61:46
- Label: Novus
- Producer: Steve Coleman

Steve Coleman chronology
| Rhythm in Mind (1991) | Drop Kick (1992) | The Tao of Mad Phat (1993) |

Drop Kick is an album by saxophonist Steve Coleman and his band Five Elements recorded in 1992 and released by Novus.

== Reception ==
The Allmusic review by Scott Yanow awarded the album 4 stars, stating, "The music is quite original yet fairly accessible due to the rhythms. Recommended".

Professional ratings
Review scores
| Source | Rating |
|---|---|
| Allmusic | 4/5 stars |

== Track listing ==
All compositions by Steve Coleman except as indicated

1. "Ramses" - 6:36
2. "Drop Kick" - 4:52
3. "Terra Nova" (David Gilmore) - 4:37
4. "The Journeyman" - 5:13
5. "Simbius Web" (Steve Coleman, Reggie Washington) - 4:42
6. "Dread Drop" - 4:07
7. "Tschanz" - 11:17
8. "Contemplation" (Marvin "Smitty" Smith) - 5:07
9. "Shift on the Fly" (Andy Milne) - 3:40
10. "Bates Motel" - 8:12
11. "Z Train" - 3:23

== Personnel ==
- Steve Coleman – alto saxophone, acoustic piano (2)
- James Weidman – acoustic piano (1, 3, 7, 9, 10), keyboards (1, 3, 7, 9, 10)
- Andy Milne – keyboards (2, 4–6, 8, 11), acoustic piano (4–6, 8, 11)
- David Gilmore – guitars, guitar synthesizer
- Reggie Washington – electric bass (1, 3, 5, 7–11)
- Meshell Ndegeocello (as Meshell Johnson) – bass (2, 6, 11)
- Marvin "Smitty" Smith – drums (1, 3, 5, 7–10), percussion (1, 3–5, 7–11)
- Camille Gainer – drums (2, 6, 11)
- Michael Wimberly – percussion (1, 4, 7, 9)
- Don Byron – bass clarinet (1, 7), clarinet (1, 7)
- Lance Bryant – tenor saxophone (1, 7)
- Greg Osby – alto saxophone (6, 11)
- Cassandra Wilson – vocals (4)

=== Production ===
- Steve Coleman – producer, mixing
- Louis Coleman – assistant producer
- Joe Marciano – recording, mixing
- Ted Jensen – mastering at Sterling Sound (New York, NY)
- Jackie Murphy – art direction
- Daniela Barceló – design
- Philip Wong – photography
- Steve Backer – series director
