= The Tao of Mad Phat =

Studio album by Steve Coleman and Five Elements
- Released: 1993
- Recorded: May 6, 7, & 23, 1993
- Studio: Systems Two (Brooklyn, New York)
- Genre: Jazz
- Length: 75:48
- Label: Novus
- Producer: Steve Coleman

Steve Coleman chronology
Drop Kick (1992)	The Tao of Mad Phat (1993)	A Tale of 3 Cities (1994)

The Tao of Mad Phat (subtitled "Fringe Zones") is an album by saxophonist Steve Coleman and his band Five Elements recorded in 1993 and released on the Novus label.

== Reception ==
The Allmusic review by Don Snowden awarded the album 4½ stars, stating, "the very organic quality of the music on The Tao of Mad Phat is the true measure of how successfully Coleman and his collaborators have extended the tradition in innovative new directions grounded in modern rhythms".

Professional ratings
Review scores
Source	Rating
Allmusic	4.5/5 stars
Jazz Forum	3/5 stars

== Track listing ==
All compositions by Steve Coleman except as indicated

1. "The Tao of Mad Phat" – 15:29
2. "Alt-Shift=Return" – 7:09
3. "Collective Meditations I (Suite): Changing of the Guard" – 3:56
4. "Collective Meditations I (Suite): Guards on the Train" – 3:06
5. "Collective Meditations I (Suite): Relax Your Guard" – 0:36
6. "Collective Meditations I (Suite): All the Guards There Are" – 2:10
7. "Collective Meditations I (Suite): Enter the Rhythm (People)" – 4:04
8. "Incantation" – 3:56
9. "Laid Back Schematics" – 8:14
10. "Polymaid Nomads" – 10:36
11. "Little Girl on Fire" (Bunky Green/Steve Coleman) – 16:32

== Personnel ==
- Steve Coleman – alto saxophone, acoustic piano (2)
- Andy Milne – acoustic piano (1, 3–9, 11), keyboards (1, 3–9, 11)
- David Gilmore – guitars (1–7, 9–11), guitar synthesizer (1–7, 9–11)
- Reggie Washington – electric bass (1–7, 9)
- Gene Lake – drums, percussion

Special guests

- Kenny Davis – acoustic bass (8, 10)
- Matt Garrison – electric bass (10)
- Junior "Gabu" Wedderburn – percussion (8, 10)
- Josh Roseman – trombone (10)
- Roy Hargrove – trumpet (10)

== Production ==
- Steve Coleman – producer, mixing
- Sophia Wong – assistant producer
- Joe Marciano – recording, mixing
- Ed Reed – assistant engineer
- Ted Jensen – mastering at Sterling Sound (New York, NY)
- Jackie Murphy – art direction
- Sean Smith – design
- Philip Wong – photography
- Steve Backer – series director
