= Michele Rosewoman =

American jazz pianist (born 1953)

- Born: Michele Rosewoman; March 19, 1953 (age 72); Oakland, California, U.S.
- Genres: Avant-garde jazz, Afro-Cuban jazz, free funk
- Occupation: Musician
- Instrument: Piano
- Years active: 1976–present
- Labels: Soul Note, Enja, Evidence Music, Blue Note (Advance Dance Disuqes)
- Website: michelerosewoman.com

Michele Rosewoman (born March 19, 1953) is an American jazz pianist who leads the big band New Yor-Uba. She has worked with Baikida Carroll, Julius Hemphill, Julian Priester, Oliver Lake, Billy Bang, Freddie Waits, Rufus Reid, Billy Hart, Reggie Workman, Celia Cruz, Chocolate Armenteros, and Paquito D'Rivera.

== Early years ==
Rosewoman was born in Oakland, California, United States, and is the daughter of visual artist Estera Roseman. Her parents operated an independent record shop in Walnut Creek, California, and her mother was also an arts educator. Rosewoman began playing the piano at age six. In her late teens she studied Cuban and Haitian folkloric rhythms and vocal traditions.

== Discography ==
=== As leader ===
- The Source (Soul Note, 1984) – quartet with Baikida Carroll, Roberto Miranda and Pheeroan akLaff
- Occasion to Rise (Evidence, 1993) – trio with Rufus Reid and Ralph Peterson
- Spirit (Blue Note, 1996) – trio with Kenny Davis and Gene Jackson

=== As a member ===
Quintessence

- Quintessence (Enja, 1987), with Greg Osby, Steve Coleman, Lonnie Plaxico and Cecil Brooks III
- Contrast High (Enja, 1988), Gary Thomas replaces Steve Coleman
- Harvest (Enja, 1993), Gary Thomas, Steve Wilson, Kenny Davis and Gene Jackson
- Guardians of the Light (Enja, 2000), Craig Handy replaces Gary Thomas
- The In Side Out (Advance Dance Disques, 2006), Miguel Zenón, Mark Shim, David Fiuczynski, Brad Jones, Derrek Phillips and Pedro Pablo Martinez

New Yor-Uba

- New Yor-Uba, 30 Years: A Musical Celebration of Cuba in America (Advance Dance Disques, 2013)
- Hallowed (Advance Dance Disques, 2019)

=== As sideman ===
- Billy Bang, Rainbow Gladiator (Soul Note, 1981)
- Oliver Lake, Otherside (Gramavision, 1988)
- Andy Laster, Hippo Stomp (Sound Aspects, 1989)
- Greg Osby, Greg Osby and Sound Theatre (JMT, 1987)
- Ralph Peterson, Art (Blue Note, 1993)

== Sources ==
- Carr, Ian; Fairweather, Digby; Priestley, Brian. Jazz: The Rough Guide, 1995, The Rough Guides, ISBN 1-85828-137-7.
- Cook, Richard, Jazz Encyclopedia. Penguin 2005, ISBN 978-0-14-102646-6
