= Tactiles =

Studio album by Liberty Ellman
- Released: 2003
- Recorded: April 30, May 1 & 9, 2003
- Studio: Orange Music Sound Studio, West Orange, New Jersey
- Genre: Jazz
- Length: 56:38
- Label: Pi Recordings
- Producer: Liberty Ellman

Liberty Ellman chronology
Orthodoxy (1997)	Tactiles (2003)	Ophiuchus Butterfly (2006)

Tactiles is an album by jazz guitarist Liberty Ellman, which was recorded in 2003 and released on Pi Recordings. He leads a quartet with Mark Shim on tenor sax, Stephan Crump on bass and Eric Harland on drums. The album also features alto saxophonist Greg Osby on three tracks.

== Reception ==
Professional ratings
Review scores
Source	Rating
The Penguin Guide to Jazz Recordings	3/4 stars

The All About Jazz review by Mark F. Turner states "Liberty Ellman's latest offering, Tactiles, obliterates the 'normal' jazz guitar mindset with its eclectic and progressive tendencies. Having hung out on stage and in the studio with the likes of pianist Vijay Iyer and multi-instrumentalist Henry Threadgill, Ellman brings a natural, forward thinking progression in the creation of music."

In a review for BBC Music, Martin Longley notes "Liberty's tunes are steeped in the steely essence of Manhattan, his highly detailed ensemble themes invariably progressing with cool, cerebral detachment."

In an article for JazzTimes Bill Milkowski says "With his new CD, Tactiles, Liberty Ellman emerges as one of the most intriguing, albeit unorthodox, guitarists on the New York scene today. An album of original, esoteric compositions marked by dense polyrhythms, dissonant, angular lines and an organic logic that ties the whole thing together in brilliant fashion."

== Track listing ==
All Compositions by Liberty Ellman

1. "Excavation" – 5:58
2. "Clean Is Rich" – 6:38
3. "Temporary Aid" – 8:08
4. "Helios" – 7:19
5. "Rare Birds" – 4:31
6. "Body Art" – 5:28
7. "How Many Texts" – 5:21
8. "Ultraviolet" – 5:09
9. "Post Approval" – 8:06

== Personnel ==
- Liberty Ellman – guitar
- Mark Shim – tenor saxophone
- Greg Osby – alto saxophone on 3,7,8
- Stephan Crump – acoustic bass
- Eric Harland – drums
