= A Time Remembered =

Studio album by Art Davis
- Released: 1995
- Recorded: January 14 and 15, 1995
- Studio: Ocean Way Recording, Los Angeles, California
- Genre: Jazz
- Length: 59:41
- Label: Jazz Planet; 4001-1
- Producer: John Koenig

Art Davis chronology
Life (1986)	A Time Remembered (1995)

A Time Remembered is an album by double bassist Art Davis. His third and final release as a leader, it was recorded on January 14 and 15, 1995, at Ocean Way Recording in Los Angeles, California, and was issued later that year on CD and vinyl by Jazz Planet, an imprint of Classic Records, as the label's inaugural release. On the album, Davis is joined by saxophonist Ravi Coltrane, pianist Herbie Hancock, and drummer Marvin "Smitty" Smith.

== Reception ==
Professional ratings
Review scores
Source	Rating
AllMusic	4.5/5 stars
Los Angeles Times	3/4 stars

In a review for AllMusic, Michael G. Nastos wrote: "Anytime bassist Art Davis records, it's an event... Davis... continues to be a force on his instrument... This is a truly outstanding recording and one of the very best CDs of 1995."

Thomas Conrad of Stereophile described the album as "session magically lit from within by inspiration, from first note to last," and called the group "a world-class cross-generational quartet." He commented: "Hancock... does something unexpected on every tune, comping and filling like pinpoints of light, paying out solos like cascades of poetry... But the revelation of A Time Remembered is Ravi Coltrane. He shapes endless ideas to lyrical elegance, even on the fly."

Coda's Elliot Bratton singled out Ravi Coltrane's solo on "Ev'ry Time We Say Goodbye," a song associated with his father, for praise, stating: "in choosing to play tenor sax instead of the soprano his father always used on Every Time, Coltrane fils uncannily found a tone close to that of Coltrane pere. The result is a solo of deep emotion and original construction that is Ravi's best of the session."

Writing for Jelly Music Magazine, Mark Craemer called the album "a clear example of how timeless an art form jazz truly is," and remarked: "Perhaps it is [the] combination of the young and seasoned professionals that makes this collection so fresh and yet familiar. The CD is a well-balanced mix of up tempo, foot-tapping cuts... along with smooth, well-conceived ballads."

== Track listing ==
1. "Evidence" (Thelonious Monk) – 7:17
2. "A Flower Is a Lovesome Thing" (Billy Strayhorn) – 7:59
3. "Driftin'" (Herbie Hancock) – 7:18
4. "Everybody's Doing It" (Irving Berlin, Art Davis) – 6:57
5. "Ev'ry Time We Say Goodbye" (Cole Porter) – 8:45
6. "Art's Boogie" (Art Davis) – 6:44
7. "Olé" (John Coltrane) – 9:08
8. "A Time Remembered: Sorrow/Uplift/Joy" (Art Davis) – 14:41

== Personnel ==
- Art Davis – double bass
- Ravi Coltrane – tenor saxophone, soprano saxophone
- Herbie Hancock – piano
- Marvin "Smitty" Smith – drums
