= Otherside (Oliver Lake album) =

Studio album / Live album by Oliver Lake
- Released: 1988
- Recorded: August 1988 & April 17, 1988
- Studio: A & R Recording, New York City; Somerville Theatre, Somerville, Massachusetts
- Genre: Jazz
- Length: 51:56
- Label: Gramavision
- Producer: Oliver Lake

Oliver Lake chronology
Impala (1987)	Otherside (1988)	Again and Again (1991)

Otherside is an album by American jazz saxophonist Oliver Lake featuring a quintet and a big band, recorded in 1988 and released on the Gramavision label. The big band pieces were commissioned by the Jazz Coalition with funding from the Massachusetts Council on the Arts and Humanities New Works Program.

== Reception ==
Professional ratings
Review scores
Source	Rating
AllMusic	3/5 stars

In his review for AllMusic, Scott Yanow states, "The often ferocious ensembles are memorable, and the rendition of 'Dedication to Dolphy' is particularly noteworthy. Fans of advanced jazz will want to get this underrated releases."

== Track listing ==
All compositions by Oliver Lake.

1. "Gano Club" – 4:23
2. "Whitestone" – 9:30
3. "Stand" – 5:08
4. "Hymn for the Old Year" – 5:18
5. "Weave Song II" – 9:08
6. "Dedicated to Dolphy" – 18:29

A & R Recording, New York City except "Dedicated to Dolphy" recorded live on April 17, 1988, at Somerville Theatre, Somerville, Massachusetts.

== Personnel ==
Quintet

- Oliver Lake – saxophone
- Geri Allen – piano
- Anthony Peterson – guitar
- Fred Hopkins – double bass
- Andrew Cyrille – drums

Big Band

- Oliver Lake, Greg Osby, Marty Ehrlich, John Stubblefield, Matt Darriau, Jay Branford – saxophone
- Stanton Davis, Baikida Carroll, Roy Okutani, Ken Cervanka – trumpet
- Frank Lacy, Al Patterson, Josh Roseman – trombone
- Pete Cirelli – bass trombone
- Mark Taylor, W. Marshall Sealy – French horn
- Michele Rosewoman – piano
- Leon Dorsey – bass
- Gene Lake – drums
