= Season of Renewal =

Studio album by Greg Osby
- Released: 1990
- Recorded: July 1989
- Genre: Jazz
- Length: 52:50
- Label: JMT; JMT 834 435
- Producer: Greg Osby

Greg Osby chronology
Cipher Syntax (1989)	Season of Renewal (1990)	Man-Talk for Moderns Vol. X (1991)

Season of Renewal is the third album by saxophonist Greg Osby recorded in 1989 and released on the JMT label.

== Reception ==
Professional ratings
Review scores
Source	Rating
AllMusic	1.5/5 stars
Los Angeles Times	3/5 stars
The Penguin Guide to Jazz Recordings	2.5/4 stars

The album received a mixed reception. The AllMusic review by Scott Yanow states, "The originals, none of which contain much of a melody, never get beyond setting mysterious moods, most of them not assisted by the inappropriate rhythms from the notable supporting cast... If Osby's solos could have been isolated from the "backing," or if the drumming were a lot freer, this music would be quite intriguing. But as it came out, the results are consistently annoying and difficult to sit through". Los Angeles Times critic Don Snowden wrote "the rhythm section leaves enough holes for the sound to veer clear of mechanical funk and the arrangements are spacious enough to effectively showcase Osby's darting alto bursts and tone color-conscious approach to soprano".

== Track listing ==
All compositions by Greg Osby except as indicated

1. "Sapphire" - 5:20
2. "Enchantment" - 3:43
3. "For the Cause" - 2:24
4. "Life's Truth" - 5:07
5. "Dialogue X" - 5:10
6. "Season of Renewal" - 4:58
7. "Mischief Makers" - 5:46
8. "Word" - 4:43
9. "Constant Structure" - 5:18
10. "Eye Witness" (Paul Samuels) - 5:34
11. "Spirit Hour" - 5:20

== Personnel ==
- Greg Osby - alto saxophone, soprano saxophone
- Edward Simon, Renee Rosnes - keyboards
- Kevin Eubanks, Kevin McNeal - guitar, guitar synthesizer
- Lonnie Plaxico - bass
- Paul Samuels - drums
- Steve Thornton - percussion
- Amina Claudine Myers (tracks 2 & 4) Cassandra Wilson (tracks 6, 8 & 11) - vocals
