= Functional Arrhythmias =

Album by Steve Coleman

Studio album by Steve Coleman
- Released: 2013
- Recorded: May 8–9, 2012; September 29–30, 2012
- Studio: Systems Two (Brooklyn, New York); James L. Dolan Recording Studio (New York City, New York)
- Genre: Jazz
- Length: 1:03:45
- Label: Pi
- Producer: Steve Coleman

Steve Coleman chronology
The Mancy of Sound (2011)	Functional Arrhythmias (2013)	Synovial Joints (2015)

Functional Arrhythmias is an album by American jazz saxophonist Steve Coleman and his band Five Elements, recorded in 2012 and released on Pi Recordings. This version of the ensemble is notable for the return of Anthony Tidd on electric bass and Sean Rickman on drums, both of whom first played with the band more than 15 years earlier. The rest of the band consists of trumpeter Jonathan Finlayson and guitarist Miles Okazaki.

== Background ==
The title of the album refers to the irrational rhythms found in healthy human heartbeat patterns and how many of its compositions utilize the heartbeat pulse. Coleman has long been fascinated with time-related themes, and Functional Arrhythmias is his attempt at creating a musical analogy of the rhythmic interaction between the circulatory, nervous, respiratory, and other biological systems of the human body. He credits drummer Milford Graves for providing the inspiration for his explorations.

== Reception ==
Professional ratings
Review scores
Source	Rating
DownBeat	4.5/5 stars

The DownBeat review by Shaun Brady states, "Most of the compositions on Functional Arrhytmias were transcribed from Coleman's improvisations, so the generally brief pieces seem to accrue layers of spontaneity, the melodies as daring and unpredictable as the improvisations."

The JazzTimes review by Lloyd Sachs says, "This may be the most openly engaging, generous effort yet by the influential founder of the M-Base movement."

In a review for BBC Music, Martin Longley states, "This is the most exciting and substantial Coleman release of the last few years, rigorously challenging, pumped with insinuating melodies, sleek with propulsive energies and pulsating with a uniquely globular funkiness."

== Track listing ==
All Compositions by Steve Coleman

1. "Sinews" – 6:53
2. "Medulla-Vagus" – 6:33
3. "Chemical Intuition" – 3:58
4. "Cerebrum Crossover" – 6:46
5. "Limbic Cry" – 5:37
6. "Cardiovascular" – 2:34
7. "Respiratory Flow" – 3:50
8. "Irregular Heartbeats" – 3:58
9. "Cerebellum Lean" – 5:28
10. "Lymph Swag (Dance of the Leukocytes)" – 3:53
11. "Adrenal, Got Ghost" – 3:08
12. "Assim-Elim" – 3:32
13. "Hormone Trig" – 4:30
14. "Snap-Sis" – 3:08

== Personnel ==
- Steve Coleman – alto saxophone
- Jonathan Finlayson – trumpet
- Miles Okazaki – guitars (2, 6, 8, 10, 11)
- Anthony Tidd – bass
- Sean Rickman – drums

=== Production ===
- Seth Rosner – executive producer
- Yulun Wang – executive producer
- Steve Coleman – producer, liner notes
- Liberty Ellman – mixing and mastering at Studio 4D (Brooklyn, NY)
- Paul Geluso – recording (1, 4, 5, 7, 13)
- Rich Lamb – recording (2, 3, 6, 8–12, 14)
- Joe Marciano – recording (2, 3, 6, 8–12, 14)
- Max Ross – recording (2, 3, 6, 8–12, 14)
- Katherine Pipal – recording assistant (1, 4, 5, 7, 13)
- Nancy Marciano – recording assistant (2, 3, 6, 8–12, 14)
- Hardy Stewart – package design
