= Banned in New York =

Live album by Greg Osby
- Released: 1998
- Recorded: December 1997
- Venue: Sweet Basil, NYC
- Genre: Jazz
- Length: 58:07
- Label: Blue Note 7243 4 96860
- Producer: Greg Osby

Greg Osby chronology
Zero (1998)	Banned in New York (1998)	Friendly Fire (1998)

Banned in New York is a live album by saxophonist Greg Osby recorded at Sweet Basil in New York City in 1997 for the Blue Note label. The album was recorded by Osby on a MiniDisc recorder placed on a table in front of the band.

== Reception ==
Professional ratings
Review scores
Source	Rating
AllMusic	4.5/5 stars
Penguin Guide to Jazz	4/4 stars

The AllMusic review by Joel Roberts stated, "This is jazz in its purest form: spontaneous, direct, and unfiltered". The Penguin Guide to Jazz listed the album as part of its "Core Collection" recommended for jazz fans. All About Jazz called it "A quality effort, which receives high, marks for representing Osby’s terrific band as a serious 'live' act minus some of the normal fluff and cosmetics. Nice work guys! ...Recommended". Harvey Pekar, writing for JazzTimes, stated: "A skilled player, Osby's always thinking; even at the fastest tempos he seems in control, and resists the temptation to go on automatic pilot".

== Track listing ==
1. "13th Floor" (Osby) - 12:54
2. "Pent-Up House" (Sonny Rollins) - 13:24
3. "I Didn't Know About You" (Duke Ellington, Bob Russell) - 11:45
4. "Big Foot" (Charlie Parker) - 14:10
5. "Big Foot" [excerpt] (Parker) - 2:42
6. "52nd Street Theme" (Thelonious Monk) - 3:12

== Personnel ==
- Greg Osby - alto saxophone
- Jason Moran - piano
- Atsushi (Az'Shi) Osada - bass
- Rodney Green - drums
