= The Razor's Edge (Dave Holland album) =

Studio album by the Dave Holland Quintet
- Released: 1987
- Recorded: February 1987
- Studio: Tonstudio Bauer; Ludwigsburg, W. Germany
- Genre: Avant-garde jazz; post-bop
- Length: 51:26
- Label: ECM 1353
- Producer: Manfred Eicher

Dave Holland chronology
Seeds of Time (1984)	The Razor's Edge (1987)	Triplicate (1988)

Dave Holland Quintet chronology
Seeds of Time (1985)	The Razor's Edge (1987)	Points of View (1998)

The Razor's Edge is a studio album by the Dave Holland Quintet, recorded in February 1987 and released on ECM later that year—the third and final release by the quintet, featuring alto saxophonist Steve Coleman, trumpeter Kenny Wheeler, trombonist Robin Eubanks and drummer ”Smitty” Smith.

== Reception ==
The AllMusic review by Scott Yanow stated: "The group's three ECM releases are well worth exploring, and this set gives listeners a strong example of their work."

Professional ratings
Review scores
Source	Rating
AllMusic	4.5/5 stars
The Penguin Guide to Jazz on CD	3/4 stars
The Rolling Stone Jazz & Blues Album Guide	4/5 stars

== Track listing ==
All tracks are written by Dave Holland except as noted

No.	Title	Writer(s)	Length
1.	"Brother Ty"	Doug Hammond	4:34
2.	"Vedana"		4:53
3.	"The Razor's Edge"		7:52
4.	"Blues for C.M."		9:15
5.	"Vortex"	Steve Coleman	8:11
6.	"5 Four Six"	Kenny Wheeler	4:26
7.	"Wights Waits for Weights"	Coleman	5:25
8.	"Figit Time"	Hammond	6:17

== Personnel ==
=== Dave Holland Quintet ===
- Steve Coleman – alto saxophone
- Kenny Wheeler – trumpet, flugelhorn, cornet
- Robin Eubanks – trombone
- Dave Holland – double bass
- Marvin "Smitty" Smith – drums
