= Life (Art Davis album) =

Live album by Art Davis Quartet
- Released: 1986
- Recorded: October 5, 1985
- Venue: New York City
- Genre: Jazz
- Length: 40:35
- Label: Soul Note; SN 1143
- Producer: Giovanni Bonandrini

Art Davis chronology
Reemergence (1980)	Life (1986)	A Time Remembered (1995)

Life is a live album by double bassist Art Davis. His second release as a leader, it was recorded on October 5, 1985, in New York City, and was issued in 1986 on CD and vinyl by Soul Note. On the album, Davis is joined by saxophonist Pharoah Sanders, pianist John Hicks, and drummer Idris Muhammad.

== Reception ==
Professional ratings
Review scores
Source	Rating
AllMusic	4.5/5 stars
The Penguin Guide to Jazz	3/4 stars

Robert Palmer of The New York Times described Davis as "one of the music's outstanding technicians and a fresh, adventurous soloist," and wrote: "This is more a democratic combo recording than an ensemble statement... He has effectively focused his players, especially Mr. Sanders, who improvises with more concentration here than on many of his own recent recordings. It would be interesting to hear Mr. Davis in a more developed group context."

In a review for AllMusic, Scott Yanow called Davis "A very talented player with complete control over his instrument," and commented: "Davis contributed all four selections to this impressive outing which is highlighted by 'Duo' (matching his bass with tenor saxophonist Pharoah Sanders) and the 19-and-a-half-minute four-part 'Add.'"

The authors of The Penguin Guide to Jazz Recordings stated that the album "belongs primarily to Sanders, whose gruffly magisterial sound tends to conquer any surroundings it finds itself in." They remarked: "The spare, modal structures open the music out, and there is an extract from Davis's large-scale 'Concertpiece for Bass', but it's Sanders (and the powerful Hicks) that one remembers."

== Track listing ==
1. "Life" (Art Davis) – 10:32
2. "Duo" (Pharoah Sanders, Art Davis) – 3:26
3. "Blues from Concertpiece for Bass" (Art Davis) – 7:12
4. "Add" (Art Davis) – 19:25

== Personnel ==
- Art Davis – double bass
- Pharoah Sanders – tenor saxophone
- John Hicks – piano
- Idris Muhammad – drums
