= Ones All =

Studio album by Dave Holland
- Released: 1995
- Recorded: May 1993
- Studio: Sear Sound, New York City
- Genre: Jazz
- Length: 57:10
- Label: VeraBra vBr 2148 2
- Producer: David and Clare Holland

Dave Holland chronology
Phase Space (1991)	Ones All (1995)	Dream of the Elders (1996)

Ones All is a solo album by English jazz bassist Dave Holland, recorded in May 1993 and released on the German VeraBra label in 1995.

== Reception ==
The AllMusic review by Tom Benton stated: "In addition to validating his stature as one of the most talented and tasteful bassists of the late 20th century, Ones All is a recording that should find an enthusiastic audience with both bass and jazz lovers alike".

Professional ratings
Review scores
Source	Rating
AllMusic	4/5 stars
The Penguin Guide to Jazz Recordings	3/4 stars

== Track listing ==
All compositions by Dave Holland except as indicated

1. "Homecoming" - 4:48
2. "Three Step Dance" (Glen Moore) - 5:00
3. "Pork Pie Hat" (Charles Mingus) - 6:32
4. "Jumpin' In" - 4:23
5. "Reminiscence" - 3:22
6. "Mr. P.C." (John Coltrane) - 4:53
7. "Little Girl, I'll Miss You" (Bunky Green) - 6:55
8. "Cashel" - 5:58
9. "Blues for C.M." - 5:26
10. "Pass It On" - 5:17
11. "God Bless the Child" (Billie Holiday, Arthur Herzog, Jr.) - 4:36

== Personnel ==
- Dave Holland – bass
