= Black Science (Steve Coleman album) =

Studio album by Steve Coleman and Five Elements
- Released: 1991
- Recorded: December 1990
- Studio: Systems Two (Brooklyn, New York)
- Genre: Jazz
- Length: 51:02
- Label: Novus; PD/PL 83119
- Producer: Steve Coleman

Steve Coleman chronology
Rhythm People (The Resurrection of Creative Black Civilization) (1990)	Black Science (1991)	Phase Space (1991)

Black Science is an album by saxophonist Steve Coleman and his band Five Elements, recorded in 1990 and released on the Novus label.

== Reception ==
Professional ratings
Review scores
Source	Rating
AllMusic	4/5 stars

The Austin American-Statesman wrote that "strong modern street music sensibilities infuse contemporary funk to create a sort of hip-hop jazz." The Edmonton Journal determined that "the off-kilter drumming of Marvin 'Smitty' Smith and darting lines of Reggie Washington's electric bass set up a complicated maze for the snaking, urgent, unceasing curiosity of Coleman's alto sax."

The AllMusic review by Scott Yanow states: "Altoist Steve Coleman's CD is recommended as a good example of his music. The improvisations are dynamic, unpredictable, and quite original... Coleman, who wrote all but one of the originals, is the dominant force behind this often-disturbing but generally stimulating music".

== Track listing ==
All compositions by Steve Coleman except as indicated

1. "The X Format" - 6:45
2. "Twister" - 7:48
3. "Turbulence" - 6:22
4. "Beyond All We Know" - 4:10
5. "A Vial of Calm" - 7:06
6. "Black Phonemics" (David Gilmore, Steve Coleman) - 4:01
7. "Ghost Town" (Dave Mills, Steve Coleman) - 6:56
8. "Magneto" (James Weidman) - 2:52
9. "Cross-Fade" - 3:07
10. "Black Phonemics (Reprise)" - 1:50

== Personnel ==
- Steve Coleman – alto saxophone
- James Weidman – acoustic piano
- David Gilmore – guitars, guitar synthesizer
- Reggie Washington – electric bass
- Dave Holland – double bass (2, 4, 5)
- Marvin "Smitty" Smith – drums
- Cassandra Wilson – vocals (1, 4, 5)
- Dave Mills – vocals (7)
- Najma Akhtar – vocals (7)

Production

- Steve Coleman – producer, mixing
- Louis Coleman – assistant producer
- Joe Marciano – recording, mixing
- Ted Jensen – mastering at Sterling Sound (New York, NY)
- Jackie Murphy – art direction, design
- Toni L.Taylor – cover art
- Steve Backer – series director
- B. Nobody Jr. – liner notes
