= Motherland Pulse =

Studio album by Steve Coleman Group
- Released: 1985
- Recorded: March–April 1985
- Studio: Eras Recording Studio (New York City, New York); Tonstudio Bauer (Ludwigsburg, Germany)
- Genre: Jazz
- Length: 40:41
- Label: JMT; JMT 850001
- Producer: Stefan F. Winter

Steve Coleman chronology
Motherland Pulse (1985)	On the Edge of Tomorrow (1986)

Motherland Pulse is the debut album by saxophonist Steve Coleman recorded in 1985 and released on JMT Records.

== Reception ==
In his review for AllMusic, Scott Yanow wrote, "The funky yet creative music has less crowded ensembles than Coleman's upcoming records would, and serves as a fine showcase for the talented and strikingly original altoist who contributed six of the eight numbers".

Professional ratings
Review scores
Source	Rating
AllMusic	3/5 stars
The Penguin Guide to Jazz Recordings	3/4 stars

== Track listing ==
All compositions by Steve Coleman except as indicated

1. "Irate Blues" (Jean-Paul Bourelly) - 4:23
2. "Another Level" - 5:46
3. "Cüd Ba-Rith" - 5:02
4. "Wights Waits for Weights" - 5:13
5. "No Good Time Fairies" - 5:48
6. "On This" - 5:11
7. "The Glide Was in the Ride" (Geri Allen) - 4:02
8. "Motherland Pulse" - 5:10

== Personnel ==
- Steve Coleman – alto saxophone
- Geri Allen – acoustic piano
- Lonnie Plaxico – bass
- Marvin "Smitty" Smith – drums (1–4, 6–8)
- Mark Johnson – drums (5)
- Graham Haynes – trumpet (3, 5)
- Cassandra Wilson – vocals (5)

=== Production ===
- Stefan F. Winter – producer
- David Baker – recording
- Carlos Albrecht – mixing
- Christine Paxmann – cover design
- Scott Sternbach – photography
