= Rhythm People (The Resurrection of Creative Black Civilization) =

Studio album by Steve Coleman
- Released: 1990
- Recorded: February 1990
- Studio: Systems Two (New York City, New York)
- Genre: Jazz, funk
- Length: 57:44
- Label: Novus
- Producer: Steve Coleman

Steve Coleman chronology
Sine Die (1988)	Rhythm People (The Resurrection of Creative Black Civilization) (1990)	Black Science (1991)

Rhythm People (The Resurrection of Creative Black Civilization) is an album by the American saxophonist Steve Coleman, released in 1990. He is credited with his band, the Five Elements.

== Production ==
Coleman wrote or cowrote all of Rhythm People (The Resurrection of Creative Black Civilization)'s songs. David Gilmore played guitar on the album; Dave Holland played bass. Members of the M-Base music collective contributed, including Cassandra Wilson. Coleman rapped on "Dangerous".

== Critical reception ==
Professional ratings
Review scores
Source	Rating
AllMusic	2.5/5 stars
Robert Christgau	A−
The Encyclopedia of Popular Music	4/5 stars
Los Angeles Times	3.5/4 stars

Robert Christgau deemed the album "almost true fusion," but praised the "secondhand funk" aspects. The Chicago Tribune determined that "Coleman's alto sax is agile enough here; it just doesn't have any of the vitality of the [street] life with which it tries so hard to connect." The Los Angeles Times admired "Robin Eubanks' fat trombone doubling Coleman's elongated alto sax melody through 'Neutral Zone', and the slippery, peek-a-boo performance of 'Ice Moves'."

The St. Petersburg Times wrote: "Taking polyrhythmic cues from Africa, Coleman has derived a freewheeling funk beat that eschews taut 4/4 patterns." The New York Times concluded that, "though the record has copious amounts of improvisation and complicated rhythmic and harmonic movement masquerading as funk, it is basically an instrumental pop record of great complexity."

AllMusic wrote that Coleman's "solo style (often relying heavily on whole-tone runs and unexpected interval jumps) is intriguing."

== Track listing ==
All compositions and lyrics for "No Conscience" and "Dangerous" by Steve Coleman, except "The Posse", which was co-written by David Gilmore.

No.	Title	Length
1.	"Rhythm People"
2.	"Blues Shifting"
3.	"No Conscience"
4.	"Neutral Zone"
5.	"Ain't Goin' Out Like That"
6.	"Step'n"
7.	"Dangerous"
8.	"Ice Moves"
9.	"The Posse"
10.	"Armageddon (Cold-Blood-Ed)"

== Personnel ==
- Steve Coleman – alto saxophone, vocals (3, 7)
- James Weidman – acoustic piano, keyboards
- David Gilmore – guitars, guitar synthesizer
- Reggie Washington – electric bass (1, 3, 4, 6–10)
- Marvin "Smitty" Smith – drums, percussion

Guest musicians

- Robin Eubanks – trombone (2, 4, 6, 7, 10)
- Dave Holland – acoustic bass (2, 5–7)
- Cassandra Wilson – vocals (10)

Production

- Steve Coleman – producer, mixing
- Louis Coleman – co-producer
- Joe Marciano – recording engineer, mixing
- Ted Jensen – mastering at Sterling Sound (New York, NY)
- Ria Lewerke – art direction
- Jackie Murphy – design
- Mike Malachi Basden – illustration
- Brian Davis – photography
- B. Nobody – liner notes
- Steve Backer – series director
