= Mindgames (Greg Osby album) =

Studio album by Greg Osby
- Released: 1988
- Recorded: May 1988
- Studio: Systems Two, Brooklyn, New York
- Genre: Jazz
- Length: 47:37
- Label: JMT; JMT 834 422
- Producer: Greg Osby

Greg Osby chronology
Greg Osby and Sound Theatre (1987)	Mindgames (1988)	Cipher Syntax (1989)

Mindgames is the second album by saxophonist Greg Osby recorded in 1988 and released on the JMT label.

== Reception ==
The AllMusic review by Ron Wynn states, "Some torrid solos but his least successful release artistically".

Professional ratings
Review scores
Source	Rating
AllMusic	2/5 stars

== Track listing ==
All compositions by Greg Osby except as indicated

1. "Dolemite" - 5:43
2. "Mindgames" - 5:27
3. "Thinking Inside You" (Edward Simon) - 3:27
4. "This Is Not a Test" - 4:11
5. "Excuse Not" (Paul Samuels) - 1:50
6. "Mirror, Mirror" - 4:56
7. "Silent Attitude" - 7:30
8. "Altered Ego" (Kevin McNeal) - 4:50
9. "All That Matters" - 6:32
10. "Chin Lang" - 2:36

== Personnel ==
- Greg Osby - alto saxophone, soprano saxophone, percussion, voice
- Geri Allen (tracks 1,7 & 9), Edward Simon (tracks 2, 3, 5, 6 & 8) - piano, synthesizer
- Kevin McNeal - guitar
- Lonnie Plaxico - bass
- Paul Samuels - drums, percussion
