= Ode to O =

Studio album by OGJB Quartet
- Released: 2022
- Recorded: June 7–8, 2019
- Studios: Sear Sound Studios, New York City
- Genre: Free jazz
- Length: 1:02:50
- Labels: TUM Records; CD 058

OGJB Quartet chronology
Bamako (2019)	Ode to O (2022)

Ode to O is the second album by the OGJB Quartet, a collaborative ensemble named after the first letters of the musicians' first names, featuring saxophonist Oliver Lake, cornetist Graham Haynes, double bassist Joe Fonda, and drummer Barry Altschul. Named after the title track, a tribute to Ornette Coleman, it was recorded on June 7 and 8, 2019, at Sear Sound Studios in New York City, and was released in 2022 by TUM Records.

== Reception ==
Professional ratings
Review scores
Source	Rating
All About Jazz	4/5 stars
Jazz Trail	4/5 stars
Jazzwise	3/5 stars
PopMatters	8/10 stars
Tom Hull – on the Web	B+

In a review for All About Jazz, John Sharpe wrote: "one of the most striking traits is how much they sound like a band... This is an outfit which merits a longer run than it may get given the difficulty of getting the four principals together."

Will Layman of PopMatters stated: "If 'vintage' sometimes means seeming old-fashioned or left behind, then these gentlemen demonstrate that fresh thinking is possible at any age. They play here with an exquisite connection to each other and to music history."

Writing for Burning Ambulance, Phil Freeman commented: "The mere fact that there's a second album by this group makes me happy. They've got a unique sound, based entirely on the interplay between the four members' personalities... there's a significant distance between what each of them does in other contexts. So listening to them cross those spaces to find somewhere to meet is what makes this music interesting."

The Big Takeover's Michael Toland remarked: "These veteran heavy hitters bring all of their talents to bear on Ode to O... It would be extremely difficult for these players to create bad music in the first place, but it's clear on Ode to O the extra inspiration they take from each other's presence."

In an article for The Quietus, Peter Margasak noted that the musicians have found "a bracing freebop sweet spot together," and wrote: "there's an abiding equanimity to the proceedings, imbuing the performances with grace regardless of how fiery things might get... The themes are elegant and memorable, elastic enough to support some fiery blowing and rhythmic dissection."

Daniel Spicer of Jazzwise praised the title track, calling it "a deceptively conventional hard-bop swinger with a big-grinned joie de vivre," as well as "Da Bang" (dedicated to Billy Bang), which "bursts out of an extended solo drum intro with an irresistible bass vamp heavy enough to establish its own gravitational field. Serious fun."

The New York City Jazz Record's George Kanzler also singled out the title track, on which Altschul and Fonda "mesh, expanding and contracting rhythms like images in a kaleidoscope, Lake and Haynes trading and jamming lines, cornet floating long notes, alto bobbing and weaving, pinching a note, arpeggiating a string of them."

A writer for Glide Magazine stated: "OGJB take in both a wide swath of sound and emotion as they journey into startling, ever-unpredictable territory.... the spirit of Coleman's free expression prevails throughout, as if to form a more contemporary but less direct version of the acclaimed quartet Old and New Dreams... who directly channeled Coleman's music."

Gary Chapin of The Free Jazz Collective commented: "I'm not going to call it effortless, but there's an ease to the group that comes from their decades of experience and the naturalness of their musical relationships. To me, OGJB represents a great time in the past, and a great time in the present."

Jon Garelick of The Arts Fuse selected the album as one of the ten best jazz releases of 2022.

== Track listing ==
1. "Ode to O" (Barry Altschul) – 6:52
2. "Justice" (Oliver Lake) – 5:22
3. "Me without Bela" (Joe Fonda) – 12:24
4. "Da Bang" (Barry Altschul) – 9:06
5. "The Other Side" (Graham Haynes) – 6:55
6. "Caring" (Barry Altschul) – 4:56
7. "OGJB #3" (Barry Altschul / Joe Fonda / Graham Haynes / Oliver Lake) – 3:53
8. "Bass Bottom" (Oliver Lake) – 2:37
9. "OGJB #4" (Barry Altschul / Joe Fonda / Graham Haynes / Oliver Lake) – 5:10
10. "Apaixonado" (Graham Haynes) – 5:10

== Personnel ==
- Oliver Lake – alto saxophone
- Graham Haynes – cornet, electronics
- Joe Fonda – double bass
- Barry Altschul – drums, percussion
