= World Expansion =

Studio album by Steve Coleman and Five Elements
- Released: 1987
- Recorded: November 1986; Systems Two, Brooklyn, N.Y.
- Genre: Jazz
- Length: 51:21
- Label: JMT; JMT 870010
- Producer: Stefan F. Winter

Steve Coleman chronology
On the Edge of Tomorrow (1986)	World Expansion (1987)	Sine Die (1987)

World Expansion (subtitled (By the M-Base Neophyte)) is the third album by saxophonist Steve Coleman recorded in 1986 and released on the JMT label.

== Reception ==
The AllMusic review by Michael Erlewine states, "Not his jazziest release, but a lot of good clean funk".

Professional ratings
Review scores
Source	Rating
AllMusic	2.5/5 stars
The Penguin Guide to Jazz Recordings	3/4 stars

== Track listing ==
All compositions by Steve Coleman except as indicated

1. "Desperate Move" - 6:18
2. "Stone Bone Jr." (Coleman, Jimmy Cozier) - 1:13
3. "Mad Monkey" - 3:36
4. "Dream State" (Coleman, Geri Allen) - 6:36
5. "Tang Lung" - 2:49
6. "Yo-Ho" (Kelvyn Bell) - 4:05
7. "And They Partied..." (Allen) - 4:17
8. "In the Park" - 2:09
9. "Just a Funky Old Song" (Graham Haynes) - 2:26
10. "Urilai Thrane" - 1:52
11. "To Perpetuate the Funk" (Kevin Bruce Harris) - 7:02
12. "Koshine Koji" - 1:43
13. "Tlydor's Bane" - 4:17
14. "Park (Pt. II)" - 0:57 Bonus track on CD
15. "Fire Theme (Intro)" - 1:56 Bonus track on CD

== Personnel ==
Musicians

- Steve Coleman – alto saxophone
- Geri Allen – keyboards, acoustic piano
- Kelvyn Bell – electric guitars
- Kevin Bruce Harris – electric bass
- Mark Johnson – drums
- Robin Eubanks – trombone
- Graham Haynes – trumpet

Vocalists

- Steve Coleman – vocals
- Robin Eubanks – backing vocals
- Kevin Bruce Harris – backing vocals
- D. K. Dyson – vocals (1, 5, 6, 11, 13)
- Jimmy Cozier – lead vocals (2)
- Malik Cozier – backing vocals (2)
- Kelana Jackson – backing vocals (2)
- Tameka Jackson – backing vocals (2)
- Cassandra Wilson – vocals (3, 4, 9)

=== Production ===
- Stefan F. Wilson – executive producer
- Steve Coleman – producer, digital mixing, art direction
- Joe Marciano – engineer
- Henry Riedel – mastering at Tonstudio Bauer (Ludwigsburg, Germany)
- Allen Hurtt – graphic arts
- Peter Postel – layout
- La Mar Thompson – photography
