= Journey to the Urge Within =

Studio album by Courtney Pine
- Released: 1986
- Recorded: 21–23 July 1986; except "Children of the Ghetto" 27 August 1986
- Studios: Angel Studios, Islington, London; except "Children of the Ghetto" Power Plant Studios, Willesden, London
- Genre: Jazz
- Length: 43:44
- Label: Island
- Producer: Michael Cuscuna

Courtney Pine chronology
Journey to the Urge Within (1986)	Destiny's Song and The Image of Pursuance (1987)

Journey to the Urge Within is the debut album by English saxophonist Courtney Pine, recorded and released in 1986. It was released on Antilles New Direction, a sublabel of Antilles, itself a subsidiary of Island Records.

== Reception ==
Professional ratings
Review scores
Source	Rating
AllMusic	4/5 stars
The Penguin Guide to Jazz	2.5/4 stars

AllMusic awarded the album with 4 stars and its review by Scott Yanow states: "This early Courtney Pine recording (the tenor saxophonist was 22 at the time) features some of the most promising black English jazz musicians of the time, including Pine (who also plays some bass clarinet and soprano), singer Cleveland Watkiss (who often is reminiscent of Bobby McFerrin), vibraphonist Orphy Robinson, and pianist Julian Joseph."

The album went on to reach number 39 on the UK Albums Chart and earned a silver disc (over 250,000 copies sold), which was unprecedented at the time for a British jazz recording.

== Track listing ==
All compositions by Courtney Pine except where noted.

1. "Miss Interpret" – 4:15
2. "I Believe" – 4:36
3. "Peace" (Horace Silver) – 5:20
4. "Dolores" (Wayne Shorter) – 3:29
5. "As We Would Say" – 3:19
6. "Children of the Ghetto" featuring Susaye Greene (Chris Amoo, Eddie Amoo) – 7:02
7. "When, Where, How and Why" – 5:20
8. "C.G.C." – 3:31
9. "Seen" – 4:28
10. "Sunday Song" – 1:27
11. "E.F.P." – 3:45
12. "Big Nick" (John Coltrane) – 4:35

== Personnel ==
- Courtney Pine – tenor saxophone on tracks 3, 6, 7 and 9, soprano saxophone on tracks 1, 2, 4 and 10, Leblanc bass clarinet on tracks 5 and 8
- Ray Carless – baritone saxophone on tracks 1 and 7
- Kevin Robinson – trumpet on tracks 5,7
- Julian Joseph – piano on tracks 1–4, 6, 7, 9 and 10
- Roy Carter – producer and keyboards on "Children of the Ghetto"
- Orphy Robinson – vibraphone on tracks 1 and 7
- Martin Taylor – guitar on "Children of the Ghetto"
- Gary Crosby – bass
- Mark Mondesir – drums on tracks 1–7 and 9
- Ian Mussington – percussion on "Children of the Ghetto"
- Susaye Greene – vocals on "Children of the Ghetto"
- Cleveland Watkiss – vocals on tracks 1, 7 and 8

Technical

- John Timperley, Pete Brown – engineer
- Billy Banks – executive producer
- David Hiscock – photography

== Charts ==
Chart performance for Journey to the Urge Within
Chart (1986)	Peak position
UK Albums (Official Charts Company)	39

== Certifications ==
Certifications for Journey to the Urge Within
Region	Certification	Certified units/sales
United Kingdom (BPI)	Silver	60,000^{^}
^{^} Shipments figures based on certification alone.
