= Triplicate (Dave Holland album) =

Studio album by Dave Holland Trio
- Released: 1988
- Recorded: March 1988
- Studio: Power Station, New York City
- Genre: Post-bop
- Length: 55:08
- Label: ECM; ECM 1373
- Producer: Lee Townsend

Dave Holland chronology
The Razor's Edge (1987)	Triplicate (1988)	The Oracle (1989)

Triplicate is a studio album by the Dave Holland Trio, recorded in March 1988 and released on ECM later that year. The trio features alto saxophonist Steve Coleman and drummer Jack DeJohnette.

== Background ==
This was the first album by Dave Holland following the dissolution of his quintet that had featured Steve Coleman, Robin Eubanks, Kenny Wheeler and Marvin "Smitty" Smith. Coleman was the sole member to remain for this session while the drum chair was filled by Jack DeJohnette, who had worked extensively with Holland in the bands of Miles Davis, Chick Corea and in Gateway.

“Four Winds” was originally recorded by Holland on his 1972 debut.

Holland would re-record his tribute to Sam Rivers, “Rivers Run," on his 2008 sextet album, Pass It On.

== Reception ==
Professional ratings
Review scores
Source	Rating
AllMusic	4/5 stars
Jazzwise	3/5 stars
The Penguin Guide to Jazz on CD	3/4 stars
The Rolling Stone Jazz & Blues Album Guide	3.5/5 stars

The AllMusic review by Scott Yanow called the album a "well-rounded date."

In an essay for ECM blog Between Sound and Space, Tyran Grillo wrote:

Triplicate is a fantastic (surprise, surprise) trio album that joins bassist Dave Holland with altoist Steve Coleman and rhythmatist Jack DeJohnette... Triplicate is not an in-your-face album but one wrought with careful language. It avoids the danger of expletives in search of a clean melodic line. One imagines that if this album were alive, the audience would be whooping and clapping all the same, but in the studio a certain cleanliness of sound wins over. This has its pros and cons, depending on your preferences, but either way we can step outside of this record knowing we’ve just experienced something joyous.

== Track listing ==
All tracks are written by Dave Holland, except as noted.

No.	Title	Writer(s)	Length
1.	"Games"	Coleman	5:04
2.	"Quiet Fire"		5:47
3.	"Take the Coltrane"	Duke Ellington	6:24
4.	"Rivers Run" (dedicated to composer and multi-instrumentalist Sam Rivers)		9:14
5.	"Four Winds"		4:18
6.	"Triple Dance"		8:05
7.	"Blue"	DeJohnette	6:06
8.	"African Lullaby"	Traditional; Holland (arr.)	3:08
9.	"Segment"	Charlie Parker	6:34

== Personnel ==
=== Dave Holland Trio ===
- Steve Coleman – alto saxophone
- Dave Holland – double bass
- Jack DeJohnette – drums
