= Bamako (album) =

Studio album by OGJB Quartet
- Released: 2019
- Recorded: July 2, 2016
- Studio: System Two Studios, Brooklyn, New York
- Genre: Free jazz
- Length: 1:03:47
- Label: TUM Records; TUM50

OGJB Quartet chronology
| Bamako (2019) | Ode to O (2022) |

Bamako is the debut album by the OGJB Quartet, a collaborative ensemble named after the first letters of the musicians' first names, featuring saxophonist Oliver Lake, cornetist Graham Haynes, double bassist Joe Fonda, and drummer Barry Altschul. It was recorded on July 2, 2016, at System Two Studios in Brooklyn, New York, and was released in 2019 by TUM Records.

== Reception ==
Professional ratings
Review scores
| Source | Rating |
|---|---|
| All About Jazz | 4.5/5 stars |
| All About Jazz | 4/5 stars |
| Jazz Journal | 3/5 stars |
| Jazz Trail | B+ |

In a review for All About Jazz, Jerome Wilson wrote: "This group has all the power, flash and muscle you would expect. Lake's heavy soul and Haynes' cool fire pair up wonderfully while Fonda is a primal force and Altschul's responsiveness to his bandmates and creativity is masterful. This is one of the musical highlights of the year and hopefully these four men continue to play together for some time." AAJ's Dan McClenaghan called the album "an innovative free-jazz outing," and stated that it "presents a free-end-of-the spectrum sound that breaks new ground while maintaining its grip on a late-fifties/mid-sixties foundation of flexibility."

Peter Gamble of Jazz Journal commented: "composing duties are shared and there's the usual problem of discerning where the written ends (or indeed starts) and the improvisation begins... This is definitely a session to appeal to those who prefer their music to exist a long way outside the mainstream."

Writing for Point of Departure, Ed Hazell remarked: "The all-star OGJB Quartet... plays urgent and passionate music with calm authority and assurance... Every element of this masterful album contributes to that feeling of inevitability and surprise that is the hallmark of great jazz."

Phil Freeman of Stereogum praised the long opening track, describing it as "a bouncing, churning free jazz journey," and writing: "The way the horns dance past and around each other, over Fonda's booming bass and Altschul's constant but constantly shifting rhythms, reminds me of the equally amazing quartet Other Dimensions in Music. Let this piece carry you away; it won't feel like a quarter hour, I swear."

In an article for The Arts Fuse, Steve Feeney called Bamako "an impressive album that looks backward and forward in time while staying in the vital present moment," noting "just how much fun it is to hear how these veterans try to think in new ways — as they do throughout this engaging release."

Exposé Online's Jon Davis stated: "Bamako is proof that Free Jazz has many facets, and some of them are quite engaging, and also that harking back to the years on either side of 1970 needn’t be tedious or hackneyed."

Writer Raul Da Gama described the music as "vivid and edifying, viscerally exciting and truly memorable," and, regarding the players, commented: "Theirs is a music that pokes and probes are the diaphanous fabric of the sonic world, forever looking to penetrate its mysteries."

Filipe Freitas of Jazz Trail stated that the musicians "all contribute compositions, work dynamics with diligence, and push their personal views into ecstatic realms where nothing feels too soft or too labored... Bamako boasts an excellent and varied repertoire that exalts the genre."

== Track listing ==
1. "Listen to Dr. Cornel West" (Joe Fonda) – 14:58
2. "Bamako" (Graham Haynes) – 6:35
3. "Be Out S'Cool" (Barry Altschul) – 5:04
4. "Stick" (Oliver Lake) – 3:25
5. "GS #2" (Joe Fonda) – 7:28
6. "Just a Simple Song" (Barry Altschul) – 6:49
7. "Is It Alright?" (Oliver Lake) – 3:28
8. "3 Phrase 09" (Oliver Lake) – 5:28
9. "OGJB #2" (Barry Altschul / Joe Fonda / Graham Haynes / Oliver Lake) – 6:34
10. "OGJB #1" (Barry Altschul / Joe Fonda / Graham Haynes / Oliver Lake) – 4:04

== Personnel ==
- Oliver Lake – alto saxophone, soprano saxophone, recitation
- Graham Haynes – cornet, dousn' gouni
- Joe Fonda – double bass
- Barry Altschul – drums, percussion, mbira
