= Rhythm in Mind =

Studio album by Steve Coleman
- Released: March 1992
- Recorded: April 29, 1991
- Studio: Systems Two (Brooklyn, New York)
- Genre: Jazz
- Length: 57:30
- Label: Novus
- Producer: Steve Coleman

Steve Coleman chronology
Phase Space (1991)	Rhythm in Mind (1992)	Drop Kick (1992)

Rhythm in Mind is an album by saxophonist Steve Coleman, recorded in 1991 and released by Novus Records.

== Reception ==
The Toronto Star wrote that "the fluid emotional work of altoist Coleman headlines an octet gathering of post-bop conservatism, spacey odysseys and booting contributions from veterans Von Freeman on tenor and Tommy Flanagan on piano."

Scott Yanow of AllMusic stated: "The music is essentially a quirky version of straight-ahead jazz with generally strong solos from the diverse players, hints of Coleman's M-Base music, and some blues. Intriguing but not essential."

Professional ratings
Review scores
Source	Rating
AllMusic	3/5 stars

== Track listing ==
All compositions by Steve Coleman except as indicated

1. "Slipped Again" (Thad Jones) - 6:50
2. "Left of Center" - 8:16
3. "Sweet Dawn" - 8:00
4. "Pass It On" (Dave Holland) - 8:05
5. "Vet Blues" - 10:20
6. "Zec" (Thad Jones) - 9:06
7. "Afterthoughts" (Kevin Eubanks) - 6:28

== Personnel ==
- Steve Coleman – alto saxophone
- Von Freeman – tenor saxophone
- Kenny Wheeler – trumpet, flugelhorn
- Tommy Flanagan – acoustic piano
- Kevin Eubanks – guitars
- Dave Holland – acoustic bass
- Ed Blackwell – drums
- Marvin Smith – drums, percussion

Production

- Steve Coleman – producer, mixing, liner notes
- Louis Coleman – assistant producer
- Joe Marciano – recording, mixing
- Ted Jensen – mastering at Sterling Sound (New York, NY)
- Jackie Murphy – art direction, design
- Brian Davis – photography
- Steve Backer – series director
