= Greg Osby =

American saxophonist (born 1960)

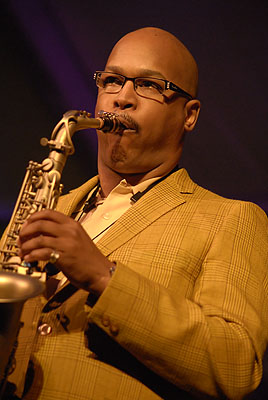
- Osby performing in 2008

Background information
- Born: August 3, 1960 (age 66); St. Louis, Missouri, U.S.
- Genres: Free jazz, free funk, M-Base
- Occupations: Musician, record label owner
- Instrument: Saxophone
- Years active: 1980–present
- Labels: JMT, Blue Note, Inner Circle Music
- Website: www.gregosby.com

Greg Osby (born August 3, 1960) is an American jazz saxophonist and composer.

== Biography ==
Born in St. Louis, Missouri, Osby studied at Howard University, then at the Berklee College of Music. He moved to New York City in 1982, where he played with Jaki Byard, Jim Hall, Muhal Richard Abrams, Andrew Hill, Jack DeJohnette, Dizzy Gillespie, and Herbie Hancock. In 1985, he joined DeJohnette's group Special Edition. With Steve Coleman, Geri Allen, and Cassandra Wilson, he was a founding member of the M-Base Collective.

Osby began recording albums under his own name for JMT Records in the mid-1980s, then signed with Blue Note in 1989. In 2007, he formed his own label, Inner Circle Music. He gave exposure to young pianist Jason Moran, who appeared on most of Osby's 1990s albums, including Further Ado, Zero, Banned in New York and Symbols of Light, a double quartet featuring the addition of a string quartet to the band.

He has also played with Phil Lesh and Friends, and he has toured with the Dead, a reincarnation of the Grateful Dead. He received the Playboy Magazine Jazz Artist of the Year award for 2004 and 2009.

Nate Chinen, writing for The New York Times, called Osby "a mentor and a pacesetter, one of the sturdier bridges between jazz generations," and stated that he has "a keen, focused tone on alto saxophone and a hummingbird's phrasing, an equilibrium of hover and flutter."

== Discography ==
=== As leader/co-leader ===
Recording date	Title	Label	Year released	Notes
1987-05, 1987-06	Greg Osby and Sound Theatre	JMT	1987	with Michele Rosewoman, Kevin McNeal, Lonnie Plaxico, Paul Samuels, Terri Lyne Carrington, Fusako Yoshida, Haruko Nara
1988-05	Mindgames	JMT	1988	with Geri Allen, Edward Simon, Kevin McNeal, Lonnie Plaxico, Paul Samuels
1989-07	Season of Renewal	JMT	1990	with Kevin Eubanks, Edward Simon, Lonnie Plaxico, Paul Samuels, Cassandra Wilson, Amina Claudine Myers, Renee Rosnes, Steve Thornton
1990-10, 1990-11	Man-Talk for Moderns Vol. X	Blue Note	1991	with Edward Simon, Michael Cain, Chan Johnson, David Gilmore, Lonnie Plaxico, James Genus, Billy Kilson, Steve Moss, and with guests Steve Coleman, Gary Thomas, Hochmad Ali Akkbar
1993?	3-D Lifestyles	Blue Note	1993	with Darrell Grant, Geri Allen, Cassandra Wilson
1995?	Black Book	Blue Note	1995	with Mulgrew Miller, DJ Ghetto, Calvin Jones, Bill McClellan
1996?	Art Forum	Blue Note	1996	with Marvin Sewell, Lonnie Plaxico, Alex Harden, Jeff "Tain" Watts, Cleave Guyton, James Williams, Darrell Grant, Robin Eubanks, Bryan Carrott
1997?	Further Ado	Blue Note	1997	with Jason Moran, Calvin Jones, Lonnie Plaxico, Eric Harland, Cleave Guyton, Jeff Haynes, Mark Shim, Tim Hagans
1997-12	Banned in New York	Blue Note	1998	Live with Jason Moran, Atsushi (Az'Shi) Osada, Rodney Green
1998-01	Zero	Blue Note	1998	with Jason Moran, Dwayne Burno, Lonnie Plaxico, Rodney Green, Kevin McNeal
1998-12	Friendly Fire	Blue Note	1999	co-led by Joe Lovano, with Jason Moran, Cameron Brown, Idris Muhammad
1999-04	Inner Circle	Blue Note	2002	with Jason Moran, Stefon Harris, Tarus Mateen, Eric Harland
1999-05	New Directions	Blue Note	2000	with Jason Moran, Stefon Harris, Mark Shim
1999-09	The Invisible Hand	Blue Note	2000	with Gary Thomas, Andrew Hill, Jim Hall, Scott Colley, Terri Lyne Carrington
2001-01	Symbols of Light (A Solution)	Blue Note	2001	with Jason Moran, Scott Colley, Marlon Browden, Nioka Workman, Judith Insell, Marlene Rice, Christian Howes
2002-11	Round & Round	Nagel-Heyer	2003	duo with Marc Copland
2003-01	St. Louis Shoes	Blue Note	2003	with Nicholas Payton, Harold O'Neal, Robert Hurst, Rodney Green
2003-11	Night Call	Nagel-Heyer	2004	duo with Marc Copland
2004-01	Public	Blue Note	2004	Live with Nicholas Payton, Megumi Yonezawa, Robert Hurst, Rodney Green, Joan Osborne
2005-02	Channel Three	Blue Note	2005	with Jeff "Tain" Watts, Matt Brewer
2008-08	9 Levels	Inner Circle Music	2008	with Sara Serpa, Adam Birnbaum, Nir Felder, Joseph Lepore, Hamir Atwal
2014	Sonic Halo	Challenge	2014	co-led by Tineke Postma, with Matt Mitchell, Linda Oh, Dan Weiss
2019	Minimalism	Inner Circle Music	2023	with Tal Cohen, João Barradas, Nimrod Speaks, Adam Arruda, Viktorija Pilatovic, Alessandra Diodati

Collaborations

- Terri Lyne Carrington, Jimmy Haslip, Greg Osby and Adam Rogers, Structure (ACT Music, 2004) – rec. 2003
- Tal Cohen, Greg Osby, Jamie Oehlers, Robert Hurst and Nate Winn, Gentle Giants (Inner Circle, 2017)

=== As a member ===
M-Base collective

- as Strata Institute, Cipher Syntax (JMT, 1989) – sextet with Steve Coleman a. o. M-Base musicians
- Anatomy of a Groove (Rebel-X (self-released), 1991; DIW, 1992)
- as Strata Institute, Transmigration (Rebel-X, 1991; DIW, 1992) – sextet with Coleman and Von Freeman

The Blue Note All Stars
With Tim Hagans, Javon Jackson, Kevin Hays, Essiet Essiet and Bill Stewart

- Blue Spirit (Blue Note, 1996)

New Directions
With Mark Shim, Stefon Harris, Jason Moran, Tarus Mateen and Nasheet Waits

- Blue Note New Directions (Blue Note/Somethin' Else, 1999)

=== As sideman ===
With Franco Ambrosetti

- Movies Too (Enja, 1988)
- Music for Symphony and Jazz Band (Enja, 1991) – rec. 1990
- After the Rain (Enja, 2015) – rec. 2014
- Cheers (Enja, 2017)

With Jangeun Bae Trio

- Go (Sony, 2008)
- Go+ (Inner Circle, 2010)
- Last Minute (Sony Korea, 2011)

With Steve Coleman

- Drop Kick (Novus/RCA, 1992) – on two tracks
- The Council of Balance (and Five Elements), Genesis & The Opening of the Way (BMG France/RCA Victor, 1997)[2CD] – on one track

With Jack DeJohnette's Special Edition

- Irresistible Forces (MCA Impulse!, 1987)
- Audio-Visualscapes (MCA Impulse!, 1988)
- Earthwalk (Blue Note, 1991)

With Jim Hall

- Panorama: Live at the Village Vanguard (Telarc, 1997) – live. on two tracks.
- The Jim Hall Quartet, Live at Birdland (ArtistShare, 2014) - live rec. 2012

With Stefon Harris

- A Cloud of Red Dust (Blue Note, 1998)
- BlackActionFigure (Blue Note, 1999)

With Peter Herborn

- Large One (Jazzline, 1998) – rec. 1997
- Large Two (Jazzline, 2002)

With Andrew Hill

- Eternal Spirit (Blue Note, 1989)
- But Not Farewell (Blue Note, 1991) – rec. 1990

With Terumasa Hino-Masabumi Kikuchi Quintet

- Acoustic Boogie (Somethin' Else, 1995)
- Moment: Alive at Blue Note Tokyo (EMI/Somethin' Else, 1996)

With Henry Kaiser & Wadada Leo Smith, Yo Miles!

- Sky Garden (Cuneiform, 2004)
- Upriver (Cuneiform, 2005)

With Phil Lesh and Friends

- Live at the Warfield, San Francisco, CA (Image Entertainment/Relix, 2006) – live
- Bethel, NY 7.09.06 (Instant Live, 2006)[3CD] – live

With Jason Moran

- Facing Left (Blue Note, 1999)
- Black Stars (Blue Note, 2001)

With Paul Motian Trio 2000 + Two

- Live at the Village Vanguard (Winter & Winter, 2007)
- Live at the Village Vanguard, Vol. II (Winter & Winter, 2008)

With Lonnie Plaxico

- Plaxico (Muse, 1990)
- Iridescence (Muse, 1991)
- Short Takes (Muse, 1992)

With Sam Rivers' Rivbea All-Star Orchestra

- Inspiration (BMG France, 1999)
- Culmination (BMG France, 1999)

With Michele Rosewoman

- Quintessence (Enja, 1987)
- Quintessence, Contrast High (Enja, 1989) – rec. 1988

With Gary Thomas

- By Any Means Necessary (JMT, 1989)
- Pariah's Pariah (Winter & Winter, 1998) – rec. 1997

With others

- John Arnold & Black Market, Opium (Cosmopolitan, 2001)
- Carlos Averhoff, iRESI (Inner Circle, 2015)
- Bob Belden, Tapestry (Blue Note, 1997)
- Cindy Blackman, Santi Debriano, David Fiuczynski, Trio + Two (Free Lance, 1991)
- Cecil Brooks III, The Collective (Muse, 1989)
- Uri Caine, The Goldberg Variations (Winter & Winter, 2000)
- Tony Cedras, The Indica Project: Horn Ok Please (Enja, 1997)
- Marc Copland, Crosstalk (Pirouet, 2011)
- Andrew Cyrille, Low Blue Flame (Tum, 2006)
- Liberty Ellman, Tactiles (Pi, 2003)
- Robin Eubanks, Karma (JMT, 1991)
- Michael Formanek, Wide Open Spaces (Enja, 1990)
- Jimmy Herring, Lifeboat (Abstract Logix, 2008)
- Bobby Previte, Charlie Hunter as Groundtruther, Latitude (Thirsty Ear, 2004)
- Bobby Previte, Terminals (Cantaloupe, 2014)
- Herbie Hancock Quartet, Live (Jazz Door, 1994)
- Graham Haynes and No Image, ¿What Time It Be! (Muse, 1991)
- Mark Helias, The Current Set (Enja, 1987)
- Jimmy Herring, Lifeboat (Abstract Logix, 2008)
- Rodney Jones, The "X" Field (MusicMasters Jazz, 1996)
- Cornelius Claudio Kreusch & BlackMudSound, Scoop (ACT, 1997)
- Oliver Lake, Otherside (Gramavision, 1988)
- Ben Markley Quartet, Basic Economy (OA2, 2018)
- Jason Moran, Soundtrack to Human Motion (Blue Note, 1999)
- Tineke Postma, Sonic Halo (Challenge, 2014)
- Project Z, Lincoln Memorial (Abstract Logix, 2005)
- Dianne Reeves, The Nearness of You (Blue Note, 1988)
- Logan Richardson, Cerebral Flow (Fresh Sound New Talent, 2007)
- Teri Roiger, Dear Abbey (The Music of Abbey Lincoln) (Inner Circle, 2012)
- Paul Samuels Speak (LKS, 2006)
- Ed Schuller & Band, The Eleventh Hour (Tutu, 1992)
- Sara Serpa, Praia (Inner Circle, 2008)
- Sara Serpa & André Matos, Primavera (Inner Circle, 2014)
