= Graham Haynes =

American jazz trumpeter

- Born: September 16, 1960 (age 65); Brooklyn, New York, U.S.
- Genres: Nu jazz
- Occupations: Musician; composer
- Instruments: Trumpet; cornet
- Years active: 1979–present
- Labels: Muse; Antilles; Polygram
- Formerly of: Five Elements; M-Base Collective; Graham Haynes and No Image
- Family: Roy Haynes (father)

Graham Haynes (born September 16, 1960, in Brooklyn, New York) is an American jazz trumpeter, cornetist, and composer. The son of jazz drummer Roy Haynes, Graham is known for his work in nu jazz, fusing jazz with elements of hip-hop and electronic music.

== Career ==
With aspirations to push jazz beyond its traditional boundaries, Graham Haynes' first foray into electronic music came in 1979 upon meeting alto saxophonist Steve Coleman. Together, they formed a band called Five Elements, which launched an influential group of improvisers called M-Base Collective. After the formation of his own ensemble – Graham Haynes and No Image – and the subsequent release of an album (What Time It Be?), Haynes would spend the balance of the 1980s studying a wide range of African, Arabic, and South Asian Music. After a move to France in 1990, Haynes incorporated these far-off influences into his next two releases – Nocturne Parisian and Griot's Footsteps.

Haynes returned to New York City in 1993 to take advantage of the flourishing hip-hop scene; and the resulting album was the sample heavy Transition. After the release of yet another hybridized album – 1996's Tones For The 21st Century – Haynes discovered drum 'n' bass and began working with some of the genres finest DJs and producers in London and the U.S. This manifested in the release of 2000s BPM, a fusion of drum n' bass beats with the classical music of Richard Wagner.

Over the years, Haynes has kept busy with several critically acclaimed multimedia projects, composed the score for films Flag Wars and The Promise, and lectured at New York University, while receiving two nominations for the prestigious Alpert Award For The Arts. He has collaborated with artists such as Roy Haynes (Graham's father), Cassandra Wilson, Vernon Reid, Meshell Ndegeocello, The Roots, David Murray, George Adams, Ed Blackwell, Bill Laswell, Steve Williamson, Pharoah Sanders and Bill Dixon.

He was featured on Vijay Iyer's 2017 ECM album, Far From Over, and in 2021 released Echolocation, a collaboration with electronic musician Submerged (DJ).

== Discography ==
=== As leader or co-leader ===
- What Time It Be (Muse)
- Nocturne Parisian (Muse)
- The Griot's Footsteps (Antilles/Verve)
- Transition (Polygram/Antilles)
- Tones For The 21st Century (Polygram/Verve)
- Organik Mechanix (ION)
- BPM (Knitting Factory)
- With a Heartbeat (with Pharoah Sanders) (Evolver)
- Full Circle (RKM)
- But You Can't, Can You? (live, Hardedge)
- Austere Geometry (live, Hardedge)
- As "Graham Haynes vs Submerged", Echolocation (Burning Ambulance Music)

With the OGJB Quartet (Oliver Lake, Haynes, Joe Fonda, Barry Altschul)

- Bamako (TUM, 2019)
- Ode to O (TUM, 2022)

=== As sideman ===
With Ed Blackwell

- What It Is? Ed Blackwell Project Vol. 1 (Enja, 1993)
- What It Be Like? Ed Blackwell Project Vol. 2 (Enja, 1994)

With Jaki Byard and the Apollo Stompers

- Phantasies II (Soul Note, 1988)

With Uri Caine

- Sphere Music (JMT, 1993)

With Steve Coleman

- Motherland Pulse (JMT, 1985)
- On the Edge of Tomorrow (JMT, 1986)
- World Expansion (JMT, 1987)

With Bill Laswell and Jah Wobble

- Radioaxiom: A Dub Transmission (Axiom/Palm, 2001)

With Abbey Lincoln

- Who Used to Dance (Verve, 1996 [1997])

With David Murray

- David Murray Big Band (DIW/Columbia, 1991)

With Bobby Previte

- Weather Clear, Track Fast (Enja, 1991)

With Vijay Iyer

- Far from Over (ECM, 2017)
