= Marvin Smith =

American jazz musician

Marvin "Smitty" Smith (born June 24, 1961) is an American jazz drummer and composer.

Marvin Smith was born in Waukegan, Illinois, where his father, Marvin Sr., was a drummer. "Smitty" was exposed to music at a young age, receiving formal musical training at the age of three.

After graduating from Waukegan East High School, Smith attended Berklee, graduating in 1981. Smith has recorded 200 albums with various artists, as well as two solo albums. He belongs to the founding members of the M-Base collective, sharing the drummer's seat with Mark Johnson. He recorded and toured in different line-ups especially with Steve Coleman, with whom he also was part of the Dave Holland Quintet in the early 1980s. He has toured with, among others, Sting, Sonny Rollins, and Willie Nelson. He is a former member of The New York Jazz Quartet, and was the drummer for the Tonight Show with Jay Leno band, led by Kevin Eubanks, from January 30, 1995 until the show's end on May 29, 2009. Smith was also the drummer for the Jay Leno Show band in 2009-10.

== Discography ==
=== As leader ===
- Keeper of the Drums (Concord Jazz, 1987)
- The Road Less Traveled (Concord Jazz, 1989)

=== As sideman ===
With Terence Blanchard and Donald Harrison

- New York Second Line (The George Wein Collection)

With Hamiet Bluiett

- Ebu (Soul Note, 1984)

With Joanne Brackeen

- Turnaround (Evidence, 1992)

With Igor Butman

- Falling Out (Impromptu, 1993)

With Donald Byrd

- Harlem Blues (Landmark, 1987)

With Don Byron

- No-vibe Zone (Knitting Factory Works, 1996)

With Michel Camilo

- One More Once (Columbia, 1994)

With Steve Coleman and M-Base

- Steve Coleman Group: Motherland Pulse (JMT, 1985)
- Five Elements – On the Edge of Tomorrow (JMT, 1986)
- Five Elements – Sine Die (Pangaea, 1987)
- Strata Institute (with Greg Osby): Cipher Syntax (JMT, 1989)
- Five Elements – Rhythm People (The Resurrection of Creative Black Civilization) (Novus/BMG, 1990)
- Strata Institute (with Von Freeman): Transmigration (Rebel-X/Columbia, 1991)
- Five Elements – Black Science (Novus, 1991)
- Rhythm in Mind (Novus, 1991)
- M-Base Collective: Anatomy of a Groove (Rebel-X/DIW/Columbia, 1992)
- Five Elements – Drop Kick (Novus, 1992)

With Larry Coryell

- Shining Hour (Muse, 1989)

With Art Davis

- A Time Remembered (Jazz Planet, 1995)

With Ray Drummond

- Excursion (Arabesque, 1993)
- Continuum (Arabesque, 1994)

With Robin Eubanks

- Karma (JMT, 1991)
- Mental Images (JMT, 1994)

With Art Farmer

- Something to Live For: The Music of Billy Strayhorn (Contemporary, 1987)
- Ph.D. (Contemporary, 1989)

With Frank Foster and Frank Wess

- Two for the Blues (Pablo, 1984)
- Frankly Speaking (Concord, 1985)

With Benny Golson

- Stardust (Denon, 1987) with Freddie Hubbard
- That's Funky (Meldac Jazz, 1995) with Nat Adderley

With Gunter Hampel New York Orchestra

- Fresh Heat – Live at Sweet Basil (Birth, 1985) with Bill Frisell, Curtis Fowlkes, Bob Stewart, a.o.

With John Hicks

- Beyond Expectations (Reservoir, 1993)

With Dave Holland

- Seeds of Time (ECM, 1983)
- The Razor's Edge (ECM, 1987)
- Extensions (ECM, 1990)

With Andy Jaffe

- Manhattan Projections (Stash, 1985) with Wallace Roney and Branford Marsalis

With the Art Farmer/Benny Golson Jazztet

- Back to the City (Contemporary, 1986)
- Real Time (Contemporary, 1986)

With Peter Leitch

- Red Zone (Reservoir, 1987)
- Portraits and Dedications (Criss Cross, 1989)
- Mean What You Say (Concord Jazz, 1990)
- Trio/Quartet '91 (Concord Jazz, 1991)
- From Another Perspective (Concord Jazz, 1993)
- A Special Rapport (Reservoir, 1993)
- Colours & Dimensions (Reservoir, 1995)
- Up Front (Reservoir, 1997)

With Carmen Lundy

- Jazz & the New Songbook: Live at the Madrid (CD and DVD, Afrasia, 2005)

With Buddy Montgomery

- Ties of Love (Landmark, 1987)

With Ralph Moore

- Rejuvenate! (Criss Cross, 1988)

With David Murray

- Children (Black Saint, 1984)

With David "Fathead" Newman

- Fire! Live at the Village Vanguard (Atlantic, 1989)
- Blue Head (Candid, 1990) with Clifford Jordan

With Joe Newman and Joe Wilder

- Hangin' Out (Concord Jazz, 1984)

With Emily Remler

- East To Wes (Concord, 1988)

With Sonny Rollins

- Sonny Rollins Plays G-Man and Other Music for the Soundtrack of the Robert Mugge Film "Saxophone Colossus" (Milestone, 1987)

With Michel Sardaby

- Going Places (Sound Hills, 1989)

With Bernie Senensky

- Wheel Within a Wheel (Timeless, 1993)

With Archie Shepp

- Soul Song (Enja, 1982)
- Down Home New York (Soul Note, 1984)

With Superblue

- Superblue 2 (Blue Note, 1989)

With Harvie Swartz, Mick Goodrick, and John Abercrombie

- Arrival (Novus, 1992)

With McCoy Tyner

- Prelude and Sonata (Milestone, 1995)

With Gebhard Ullmann, Andreas Willers, and Bob Stewart

- Suite Noire (Nabel, 1990)

With Bobby Watson

- Jewel (Amigo, 1983)
- Gumbo (Amigo, 1985)
- Love Remains (Red, 1986 [1988])

With Tommy Ward

- From This Moment On (2021)
