= Steve Williamson =

English saxophonist and composer (born 1964)

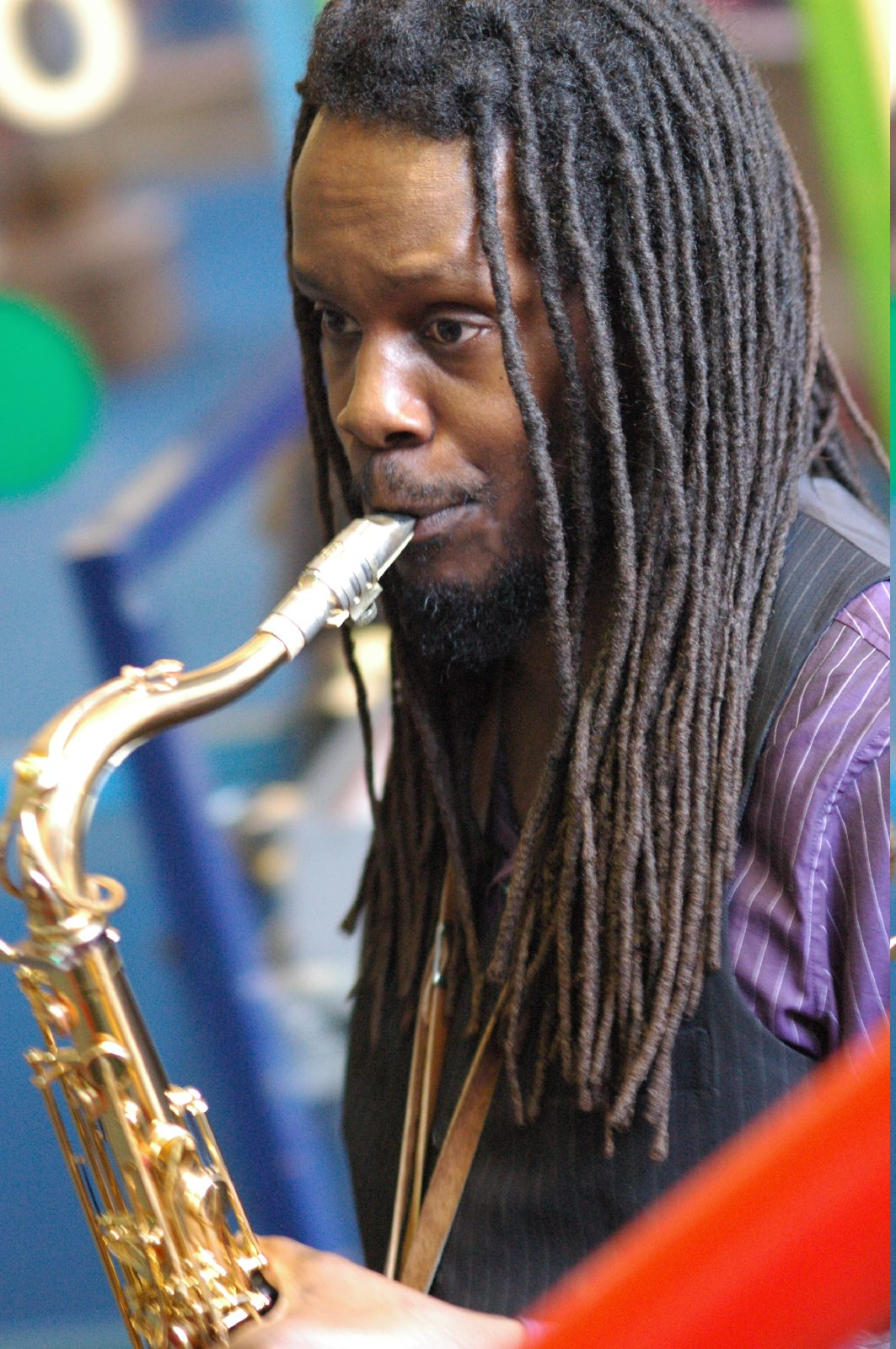

Background information
- Born: 28 June 1964 (age 61); London, England
- Occupations: Saxophonist, composer
- Instruments: Tenor, soprano and alto saxophones, keyboards
- Years active: 1982–present
- Labels: Verve, Universal Distribution, Polydor
- Website: stevewilliamson.co

Steve Williamson (born 28 June 1964) is an English saxophonist and composer (tenor saxophone, soprano saxophone, alto saxophone, keyboard and composition). He has been called "one of the most distinctive saxophone voices in contemporary British jazz".

== Biography ==
Born in London, England, to Jamaican parents, Williamson began playing saxophone at the age of 16 and started his career playing in reggae bands, including Misty in Roots.

In 1984 and 1985 he studied at London's Guildhall School of Music, where he was tutored by Lionel Grigson. Williamson was a member of the noted collective of British-born black jazz musicians who came together as the Jazz Warriors in the mid-1980s.

At the Nelson Mandela 70th birthday open-air festival in 1988, Williamson played alongside Courtney Pine in Wembley Stadium, and afterwards was a constant presence at Ronnie Scott's Jazz Club. He was member of Louis Moholo's Viva La Black (1988) and of Chris McGregor's Brotherhood of Breath (1990). During the 1990s he led his own band and appeared in projects of Iain Ballamy, Maceo Parker, Bheki Mseleku, US3, and Graham Haynes.

In 1990, Williamson released his first album A Waltz for Grace with Verve, featuring vocalist Abbey Lincoln. In 1992, he released his second album, Rhyme Time, followed by Journey to Truth in 1994, featuring Cassandra Wilson.

== Discography ==
As leader

- A Waltz for Grace (Verve, 1990) with Abbey Lincoln
- Rhyme Time (Verve, 1992) with Cassandra Wilson
- Journey To Truth (Nippon Phonogram, 1994)
- #One (Babel, 2014) with Black Top (Orphy Robinson, Pat Thomas)

As sideman

- Jazz Warriors, Out of Many, One People (1987)

== Sources ==
- Martin Kunzler, Jazz-Lexikon, vol. 2, 2002. ISBN 3-499-16513-9
