= Steve Coleman =

American saxophonist, composer, bandleader and music theorist

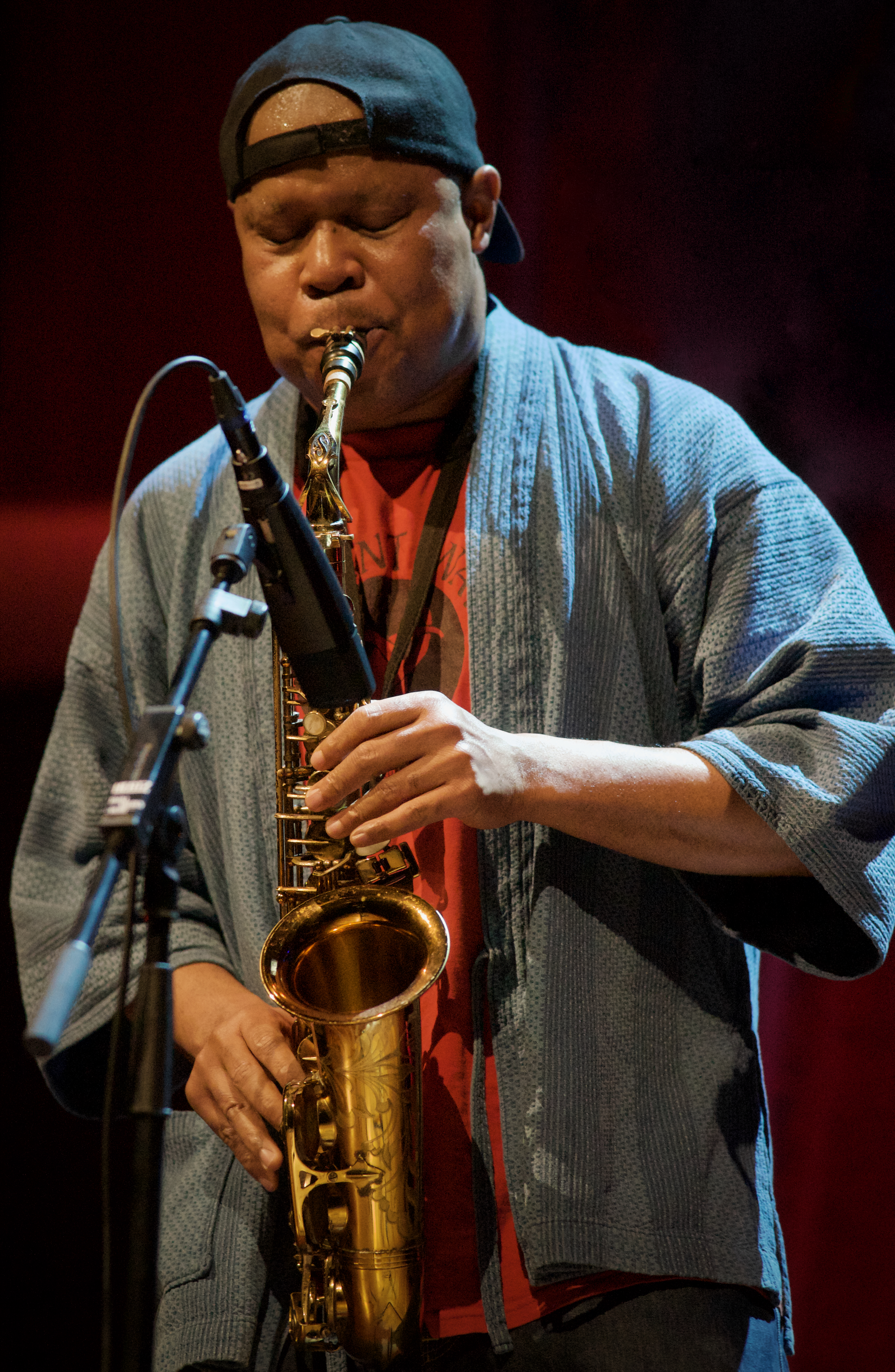
- Coleman in Utrecht, Netherlands, 2017

Background information
- Born: Steven Douglas Coleman; September 20, 1956 (age 70); Chicago, Illinois, U.S.
- Genres: Jazz, avant-garde, M-Base
- Occupations: Musician, composer, bandleader
- Instrument: Saxophone
- Labels: JMT, Pangaea, Novus, BMG, Label Bleu, Pi

Steve Coleman (born September 20, 1956) is an American saxophonist, composer, bandleader and music theorist. In 2014, he was named a MacArthur Fellow.

== Early life ==
Steve Coleman was born and grew up in South Side, Chicago. He started playing alto saxophone at the age of 14. Coleman attended Illinois Wesleyan University for two years, followed by a transfer to Roosevelt University (Chicago Musical College).

Coleman moved to New York in 1978 and worked in big bands such as the Thad Jones/Mel Lewis Orchestra, Slide Hampton's big band, Sam Rivers' Studio Rivbea Orchestra, and briefly in Cecil Taylor's big band. Shortly thereafter, Coleman began working as a sideman with David Murray, Doug Hammond, Dave Holland, Michael Brecker and Abbey Lincoln. During his first four years in New York, Coleman played in the streets and in small clubs with a band that he put together with trumpeter Graham Haynes. This group would evolve into Steve Coleman and Five Elements, which would serve as the main ensemble for Coleman's activities. In this group, he developed his concept of improvisation within nested looping structures. Coleman collaborated with other young African-American musicians such as Cassandra Wilson and Greg Osby, and they founded the so-called M-Base movement.

== Research ==
Coleman regards the music tradition he is coming from as African Diasporan culture with essential African retentions, especially a certain kind of sensibility. He searched for these roots and their connections of contemporary African-American music. For that purpose, he travelled to Ghana at the end of 1993 and came in contact with (among others) the Dagomba (Dagbon) people whose traditional drum music uses complex polyrhythm and a drum language that allows sophisticated speaking through music (described and recorded by John Miller Chernoff). Thus, Coleman was animated to think about the role of music and the transmission of information in non-western cultures. He wanted to collaborate with musicians who were involved in traditions which come out of West Africa. One of his main interests was the Yoruba tradition (predominantly out of western Nigeria) which is one of the ancient African religions underlying Santería (Cuba and Puerto Rico), Vodou (Haiti) and Candomblé (Bahia, Brazil).

In Cuba, Coleman found the group Afrocuba de Matanzas, which specialized in preserving various styles of rumba as well as all persisting African traditions in Cuba which are mixed together under the general title of Santería (Abakuá, Arara, Congo, Yoruba). In 1996 Coleman along with a group of 10 musicians and dancers and the group Afrocuba de Matanzas worked together for 12 days, performed at the Havana Jazz Festival, and recorded the album The Sign and the Seal. In 1997 Coleman took a group of musicians from America and Cuba to Senegal to collaborate and participate in musical and cultural exchanges with the musicians of the local Senegalese group Sing Sing Rhythm. He also led his group Five Elements to the south of India in 1998 to participate in a cultural exchange with different musicians in the carnatic music tradition.

In September 2014, Coleman was awarded a MacArthur Fellowship for "refreshing traditional templates to create distinctive and innovative work in ... jazz."

== Sexual misconduct allegations ==
In 2017, saxophonist María Grand wrote an open letter accusing Coleman of sexual misconduct. In the letter, Grand alleged Coleman had taken advantage of his position as an older mentor to groom and manipulate her into a romantic and sexual relationship.

In November 2018, Coleman claimed their relationship was entirely consensual. He sued Grand for defamation in a US district court, and Grand countersued, alleging defamation. The court ruled that Grand's statements were protected opinions and not defamation. Coleman appealed in 2021, and the appeal was rejected in 2025.

== Discography ==
=== As leader ===
- Motherland Pulse (JMT, 1985)
- On the Edge of Tomorrow (JMT, 1986)
- World Expansion (JMT, 1987)
- Sine Die (Pangaea, 1988)
- Rhythm People (The Resurrection of Creative Black Civilization) (RCA Novus, 1990)
- Black Science (RCA Novus, 1991)
- Phase Space with Dave Holland (Rebel-X, 1991)
- Drop Kick (RCA Novus, 1992)
- Rhythm in Mind (Novus, 1992)
- The Tao of Mad Phat (RCA Novus, 1993)
- We Beez Like That! (InfoMatin, 1995)
- Myths, Modes and Means (BMG, 1995)
- The Way of the Cipher (BMG, 1995)
- Def Trance Beat (BMG, 1995)
- Curves of Life (BMG, 1995)
- Steve Coleman's Music: Live in Paris (BMG, 1995)
- The Sign and the Seal (BMG, 1996)
- Genesis & the Opening of the Way (BMG, 1997)
- The Sonic Language of Myth (RCA Victor, 1999)
- The Ascension to Light (BMG, 2001)
- Resistance Is Futile (Label Bleu, 2001)
- On the Rising of the 64 Paths (Label Bleu, 2002)
- Lucidarium (Label Bleu, 2004)
- Weaving Symbolics (Label Bleu, 2006)
- Invisible Paths: First Scattering (Tzadik, 2007)
- Harvesting Semblances and Affinities (Pi, 2010) – recorded in 2006–07
- The Mancy of Sound (Pi, 2011) – recorded in 2007
- Functional Arrhythmias (Pi, 2013)
- Synovial Joints (Pi, 2015)
- Morphogenesis (Pi, 2017)
- Live at the Village Vanguard Vol. I (The Embedded Sets) (Pi, 2018)
- Live at the Village Vanguard Vol. II (MDW NTR) (Pi, 2021)
- PolyTropos / Of Many Turns (Pi, 2024)

=== As leader of M-Base ===
- M-Base, Anatomy of a Groove (DIW, 1992)

=== As sideman ===
With Doug Hammond

- Spaces (Idibib, 1982) – digitally remixed and produced by Coleman (Rebel-X, 1991)
- Perspicuity (L+R, 1991)

With Dave Holland

- Jumpin' In (ECM, 1984)
- Seeds of Time (ECM, 1985)
- The Razor's Edge (ECM, 1987)
- Triplicate (ECM, 1988)
- Extensions (ECM, 1990)

With Thad Jones/Mel Lewis Orchestra

- The Orchestra (West Wind, 1990) – rec. live in Berlin, October 1978
- Body and Soul (West Wind, 1990) – rec. live in Berlin, October 1978; both reissued as double CD
- A Touch of Class (West Wind, 1992) – rec. live in Warsaw, late October 1978 (prev. released on two LPs on PolJazz)
- In Europe (ITM Archives, 2007) – re-release of both 1978 concerts together

With Mel Lewis and The Jazz Orchestra

- Naturally (Telarc, 1979) – play arrangements by Thad Jones; no solo by Coleman
- Play the Compositions of Herbie Hancock – Live in Montreux (MPS, 1981) – arranged by Bob Mintzer; no solo by Coleman

With Abbey Lincoln

- Talking to the Sun (Enja, 1984)
- Who Used to Dance (Verve, 1997)

With David Murray

- Live at Sweet Basil Volume 1 (Black Saint, 1984)
- Live at Sweet Basil Volume 2 (Black Saint, 1984)

With Errol Parker

- The Errol Parker Tentet (Sahara, 1982)
- Live at the Wollman Auditorium (Sahara, 1985)

With Sam Rivers

- Colours (Black Saint, 1983)
- Inspiration (BMG France, 1999)
- Culmination (BMG France, 1999)

With The Roots

- From the Ground Up (Talkin' Loud, 1994)
- Do You Want More?!!!??! (DGC, 1995) – recorded in 1993–94
- Illadelph Halflife (DGC, 1996)

With Marvin "Smitty" Smith

- Keeper of the Drums (Concord Jazz, 1987)
- The Road Less Traveled (Concord Jazz, 1989)

With Cassandra Wilson

- Point of View (JMT, 1986)
- Days Aweigh (JMT, 1987)
- Jumpworld (JMT, 1990)
- Traveling Miles (Blue Note, 1999)

With others

- Geri Allen, Open on All Sides in the Middle (Minor Music, 1987)
- Franco Ambrosetti, Tentets (Enja, 1985)
- Cindy Blackman, Code Red (Muse, 1992) – recorded in 1990
- Bob Brookmeyer, Composer & Arranger (Gryphon, 1980)
- Ravi Coltrane, Moving Pictures (RCA/BMG, 1998)
- Stanley Cowell, Back to the Beautiful (Concord Jazz, 1989)
- Dice Raw, Reclaiming the Dead (MCA, 2000)
- Robin Eubanks, Different Perspectives (JMT, 1989)
- The Fleshtones, Brooklyn Sound Solution (Yep Roc, 2011)
- Chico Freeman, Tangents (Elektra/Musician, 1984)
- Craig Harris, Souls Within the Veil (Aquastra Music, 2005)
- Billy Hart, Oshumare (Gramavision, 1984)
- Vijay Iyer, Memorophilia (Asian Improv, 1995)
- MC Solaar, Prose Combat (Talkin' Loud, 1994)
- Sato Michihiro, Rodan (hat ART, 1989)
- Andy Milne, Forward to Get Back (D'Note 1997)
- Lonnie Plaxico, Plaxico (Muse, 1990)
- Dafnis Prieto, Back to the Sunset (Dafnison Music 2018)
- Michele Rosewoman, Quintessence (Enja, 1987)
- Mal Waldron, Soul Eyes (RCA Victor, 1997)
