= Elorza (surname) =

Elorza is a Basque surname. Notable people with the surname include:

- Cosme Damián de Churruca y Elorza (1761–1805), Basque Spanish noble, admiral and politician
- Jorge Elorza (born 1976), American law professor and politician
- Julián Elorza Aizpuru (1879–1964), Spanish politician
- Pablo Elorza (born 1982), Argentine bass player, composer, arranger, author, producer and educator
- Patricia Elorza (born 1984), Spanish handball player
