= Sinan Alimanović =

Serbian jazz pianist

- Born: 11 February 1954 (age 72); Leskovac, PR Serbia, FPR Yugoslavia
- Genres: Jazz
- Occupation: Musician
- Instruments: Piano, keyboards, organ
- Years active: 1974–present
- Labels: Miles High, PGP-RTB, Jugoton, Diskoton, ZKP RTLJ, Sarajevo, RTV BIH, Sarajevo – Radio and Television of Bosnia and Herzegovina, Croatia, Hi-Fi Centar, Komuna, Nika, PGP-RTS

Sinan Alimanović (born 11 February 1954) is a Bosnian jazz pianist, organist, composer, conductor, arranger and educator.

== Biography ==
Sinan Alimanović has worked with American and European jazz musicians such as Randy Brecker, Harvie S, Duško Gojković, Erich Kleinschuster, Alex Blake, Victor Lewis, Barbara Hendricks, Gianni Basso, Aladar Pege, Vaclav Zahradnik, Lee Harper, Csaba Deseo, Jim Mullen, Robert Balzar, Jože Privšek, Miljenko Prohaska, Tony Lakatos, Tony Fisher, Ladislav Fidri, Stjepko Gut, Petar Ugrin, Bobby Sanabria and many others.

Sinan Alimanović studied at the Academy of Music in Skopje, Priština, and Sarajevo. He began his musical career with rock and jazz bands, jazz ensembles and large orchestras, performing throughout the former Yugoslavia. During the 1970s, he became a member of the Revue Orchestra of the Radio Television of Priština (now: Radio Television of Kosovo). In 1979, Alimanović moved to Sarajevo, where he became a member of the rhythm section, arranger, composer and conductor of the Great Orchestra (Big band) of Radio Television of Sarajevo (now: Radio and Television of Bosnia and Herzegovina). After he met Slobodan Kovačević, he became a member of the rock group Indexi. In 1981, at the Festival Vaš šlager sezone, Sinan Alimanović won the award for the best arrangement for the song "Betonska Brana", which he composed together with guitarist Slobodan Bodo Kovačević. In 1983, Sinan left the group Indexi. In 1997, he returned and remained with the band until the death of the lead singer Davorin Popović. In the 1980s, he collaborated with the rock bands in Sarajevo such as Bijelo dugme, Ambasadori. His interest in jazz led him to compose music characterized by rhythmic measures close to the Balkans combined with the sound of Hammond Organ and Fender Rhodes.

Twice he was a member of the EBU/UER Public Jazz Orchestra (1986 – Opatija and 1990 – St. Gerold) as the only representative of the former Yugoslavia. While he worked in the big band of Radio and Television of Bosnia and Herzegovina, he also led small bands. His compositions are often based on the folk music of Bosnia and Herzegovina and the Balkans, while, simultaneously, his musical aesthetic is built on the disseminated seeds of bebop, hard bop, and cool jazz.

At the Glazbena Parada Radenci Sinan Alimanović won the award by Yugoslav Radio Television for the musical processing and orchestration of the theme "Oj golube, moj golube". The composition was performed by the Big Band of Radio Television of Sarajevo.

In the 1980s, Sinan Alimanović opened the first jazz club in Sarajevo, named the Jazz Club of the International Friendship, that was included in the map of the World Jazz Clubs.

During the Siege of Sarajevo, Sinan Alimanović and a group of enthusiasts were trying to preserve a cultural scene of Bosnia and Herzegovina alive. On four occasions, he was conductor and arranger at the Eurovision Song Contest. In the book The Eurovision Song Contest – The Official History, author John Kennedy O'Connor mentions Sinan Alimanović as the conductor who performed often at this competition. During the war, he composed "Sarajevo Remake" which was performed for the first time in 1993 with the remaining members of the big band of Radio and Television of Bosnia and Herzegovina in the occupied city. Ten years later, Alimanović released an album named Sarajevo Remake.

In 1997, he returned to Indexi and recorded Kameni cvjetovi, their second studio album in 39-year-long career. The album contained the Bosnian traditional song Sevdalinka "Snijeg pade na behar, na voće" with jazz arrangement by Alimanović. With Indexi Alimanović also recorded two live albums.

Sinan Alimanović was also Director of Music Production of Radio Television of Bosnia and Herzegovina (MP BHRT) from 1994 to 2002. During that time, he led twenty music festivals.

As a conductor and one of the founders of the Sarajevo Big Band, he performed at the Olympic Hall Zetra in Sarajevo in 2000. Guests included Duško Gojković, Indexi, and Oliver Dragojević. The concert was recorded and released under the title Najveći koncert u gradu. In 2003, he released the album Sinan Alimanović Quintet – Sarajevo Remake. A double album Bosnia Groove by Sinan Alimanović International Band, was released in 2007. It was followed by the live album Live in Tuzla by Sinan Alimanović Ladislav Fidri Quartet (2009). In 2016, Sinan Alimanović released live solo piano album Live in Sarajevo. In 2017, live album Live in Studio: Bosnian Blue by Sinan Alimanović International Band is released. In 2019, the album Live in Skenderija by Sinan Alimanović Trio was released.

In 2013, Sinan Alimanović's composition Lejla has been selected in TOP 5 world's jazz compositions by Made in New York Jazz Competition and jury members: Randy Brecker, Joe Lovano and Lenny White.

As the professor at the Sarajevo Music Academy, Sinan Alimanović educated the first generations of jazz students in the history of the Sarajevo Music Academy. In 2018, the Sarajevo Music Academy released the album The First Jazz Concert of the Sarajevo Music Academy Students / (Prvi jazz koncert studenata Muzičke akademije u Sarajevu), held under the musical mentorship of Sinan Alimanović.

In September 2020 jazz label Miles High Records released the album Lejla by Sinan Alimanović International Band. Sinan Alimanović International Band members are: Harvie S (double bass), Victor Lewis (drums), Lejla Alimanović (vocals), Jed Levy (saxophone), Adam Klemm (saxophone). The album Lejla has been recorded at the Trading 8s Recording Studio owned by Chris Sulit.

The Sinan Alimanović International Band has been active in various forms since early eighties. With his International Band, Sinan Alimanović performed over the Europe, United States of America and China. Alimanović is listed on the web site of the world, contemporary composers MusicaNeo. His work is also listed in world jazz archives – Jazz Music Archives. As the Bosnian Jazz ambassador in 2015, Sinan Alimanović was invited to perform at the 2nd Annual Jazz Gala Concert held at the Tribeca Performing Arts Center, New York City. The documentary movie Sinan Alimanović Jazz Musician was produced by Radio Television of Bosnia and Herzegovina. The documentary was directed by Emir Saltagić, while the screenplay was written by Dr. Vinko Krajtmajer.

== Discography ==
=== As leader/co-leader ===
- 2003 "Sinan Alimanović Quintet – Sarajevo Remake"
- 2007 "Sinan Alimanović International Band – Bosnia Groove"
- 2009 "Sinan Alimanović Ladislav Fidri Quartet – Live in Tuzla"
- 2016 "Sinan Alimanović – Live in Sarajevo"
- 2017 "Sinan Alimanović International Band – Live in Studio: Bosnian Blue"
- 2019 "Sinan Alimanović Trio – Live in Skenderija"
- 2020 "Sinan Aimanović International Band – Lejla"

=== As sideman ===
Sarajevo Music Academy

- 2018 Prvi jazz koncert studenata Muzičke akademije u Sarajevu

With Indexi

- 1981 Betonska Brana VŠS
- 1999 Kameni cvjetovi
- 2000 Najveći koncert u gradu 01. 12. 2000. Zetra
- 2002 Posljednji koncert u Sarajevu
- 2009 The Best of... /Live Tour 1998/1999 Vol. 1
- 2009 Live Tour 1998/1999 Vol. 1

With Kosovski božuri

- 1978 Veče Rok Muzike – JRT Opatija
- 1979 Opatija '79 – Rock Grupe

With Ambasadori

- 1980 Ne mogu nam ništa!/Partizan
- 1980 Dao sam ti što se moglo dati

With Bijelo Dugme

- 1986 Pljuni i zapjevaj moja Jugoslavijo
- 2000 Pljuni i zapjevaj moja Jugoslavijo
- 1990 Nakon svih ovih godina
- 1994 Hajdemo u planine
