= Joao Barradas =

Portuguese accordionist

João Barradas
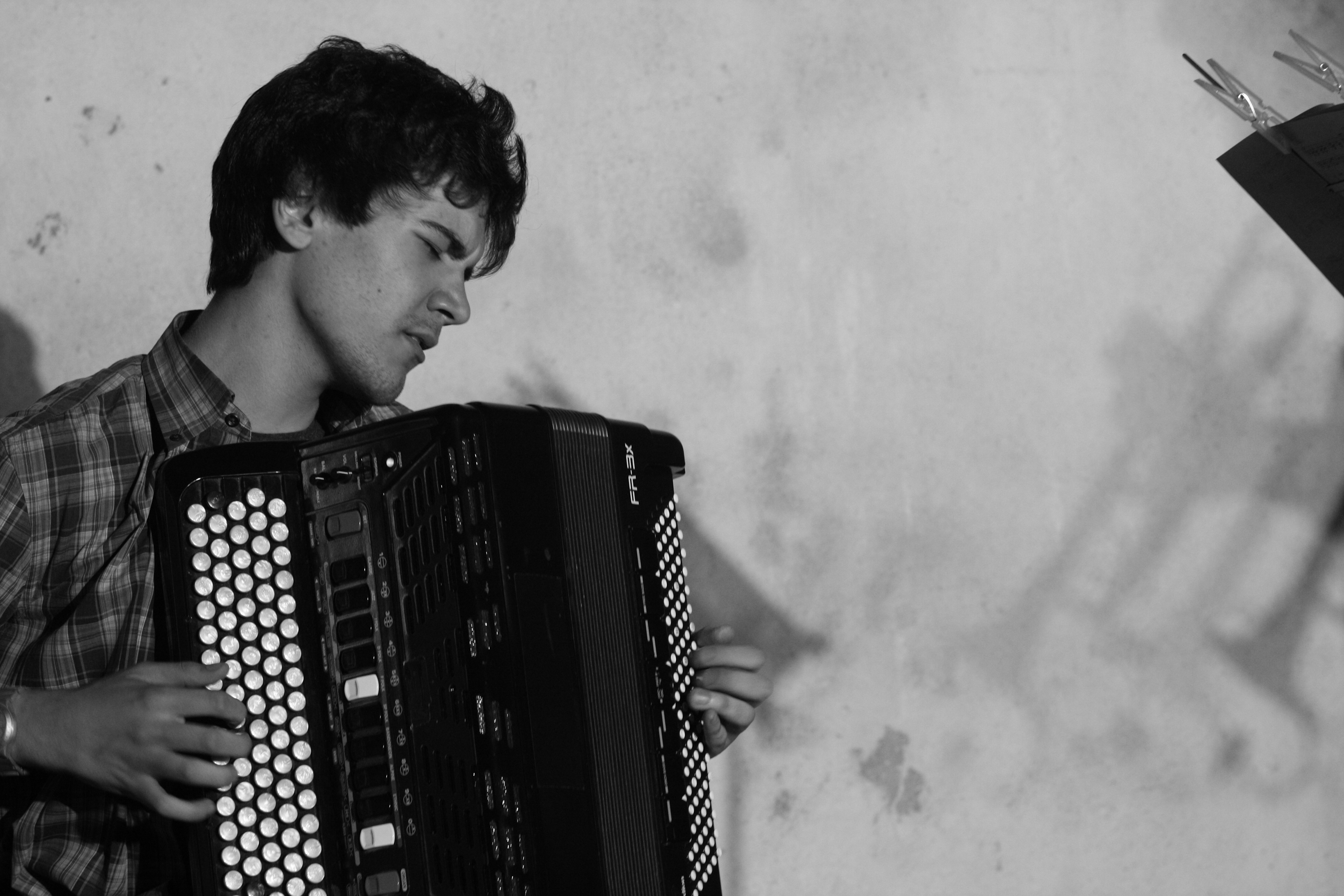
- João Barradas playing at Setúbal Jazz Festival in Portugal. Photography by Arlindo Pereira

Background information
- Born: February 3, 1992 (age 34)
- Origin: Portugal
- Genres: Jazz, Classical music
- Instrument: Accordion
- Label: Inner Circle Music
- Website: joaombarradas.net

João Barradas (born 3 February 1992) is a Portuguese accordionist and composer.

== Biography ==
João Barradas was born in Porto Alto, in the parish of Samora Correia. He initiated his accordion studies at the age of six at a small music school in Samora Correia, then gained admission to Instituto de Música Vitorino Matono in Lisbon, and at the age of nine, was admitted directly to the second year of the Official Accordion Course at the National Conservatory, finishing his training with the highest mark of 20/20. João Barradas has participated in various national and international contests, having done his preparation at the Música Serenata School, directed by Aníbal Freire. After this period he continues studying with Greg Osby, Frédéric Deschamps and João Paulo Esteves da Silva. At the age of only 19 he recorded the CD "Surrealistic Discussion", created together with tubist Sérgio Carolino. This album marked the beginning of the record career of the young accordionist in the world of erudite music. Internationally, he goes to various workshops and master classes. He knows and works with Mark Turner, Avishai Cohen, Jim Black, Eric Harland, Nir Felder, Carlos Bica, Miguel Zenón, Robin Eubanks, Matt Penman, Stefan Harris and Frank Möbus. At the same time, he starts being noticed by the top names of American Jazz, such as Nicholas Payton or Walter Smith III and his name comes up at the most important national and international Jazz festivals. Having recorded for the New York record label Inner Circle Music João Barradas has collaborated with names such as: Greg Osby, Gil Goldstein, Fabrizio Cassol, Mark Colenburg, Jacob Sacks, Rufus Reid, Federico Malaman, Philip Harper, Bobby Sanabria, Tommy Campbell, Sérgio Carolino, Pedro Carneiro, among many others.

== Prizes ==
- 2000 - 1st Prize in VI National Trophy of Accordion – Initiated Category
- 2000 - 1st Prize in 12th Accordion Festival of Barra Cheia
- 2001 - 1st Prize in 13th Accordion Festival of Barra Cheia
- 2002 - 1st Prize in VIII National Trophy of Accordion – Infantile Category
- 2003 - 1st Prize in 36th International Accordion Competition, Croatia, B Category
- 2004 - 1st Prize in 29th International "Città di Castelfidardo" Award, Italy, H Category
- 2005 - 1st Prize in XI National Trophy of Accordion – Juvenile Varietté Category
- 2006 - 1st Prize in I Cermame de Accordions Vila de Cedeira, Classic Júnior Category
- 2006 - 1st Prize in XII National Trophy of Accordion – Juvenile Varietté Category
- 2006 - 1st Prize in XII National Trophy of Accordion – Juvenile Classic Category
- 2006 - 1st Prize in III Iberian Trophy of Accordion – Juvenile Varietté Category
- 2006 - 1st Prize in III Iberian Trophy of Accordion – Juvenile Classical Category
- 2007 - 1st Prize in XIII National Trophy of Accordion – Juvenile Varietté Category
- 2007 - 1st Prize in XIII National Trophy of Accordion – Juvenile Classic Category
- 2007 - 1st Prize in II Certame de Accordions Vila de Cedeira, Spain – Júnior Varietté
- 2007 - 1st Prize in IV Iberian Trophy of Accordion – Juvenile Varietté Category
- 2007 - 1st Prize in IV Iberian Trophy of Accordion – Juvenile Classic Category
- 2007 - 1st Prize in 57th World Trophy of Accordion (CMA), Russia – Junior Varietté
- 2008 - 1st Prize in XIV National Trophy of Accordion, Junior Classic Category
- 2009 - 1st Prize in XV National Trophy of Accordion, Junior Classic Category
- 2010 - 1st Prize in XVI National Trophy of Accordion, Junior Classic Category
- 2010 - 1st Prize in International Prize of Accordion "City of Alcobaça"
- 2010 - 1st Prize in 60th World Trophy of Accordion (CMA), Spain – Junior Classical
- 2010 - 1st Prize in 63rd Coupe Mondiale (CIA), Croatia – Junior Classical
- 2012 - 1st Prize in EDP Cool Jazz Talents
- 2013 - 1st Prize in Folefest 2013
- 2013 - 1st Prize in 11th Jazz Fest of São Luiz Theatre
- 2013 - 1st Prize in 7th V-Accordion Festival Roland Iberia
- 2014 - 1st Prize in Folefest 2014
- 2015 - 1st Prize in Made in New York Jazz Competition (Solo Instrumental Category)
- 2015 - 1st Prize in Made in New York Jazz Competition (All Categories)
- 2016 - 1st Prize - Young Musician Award - Jazz
