= Juan Garcia-Herreros =

Colombian bassist

Juan García-Herreros
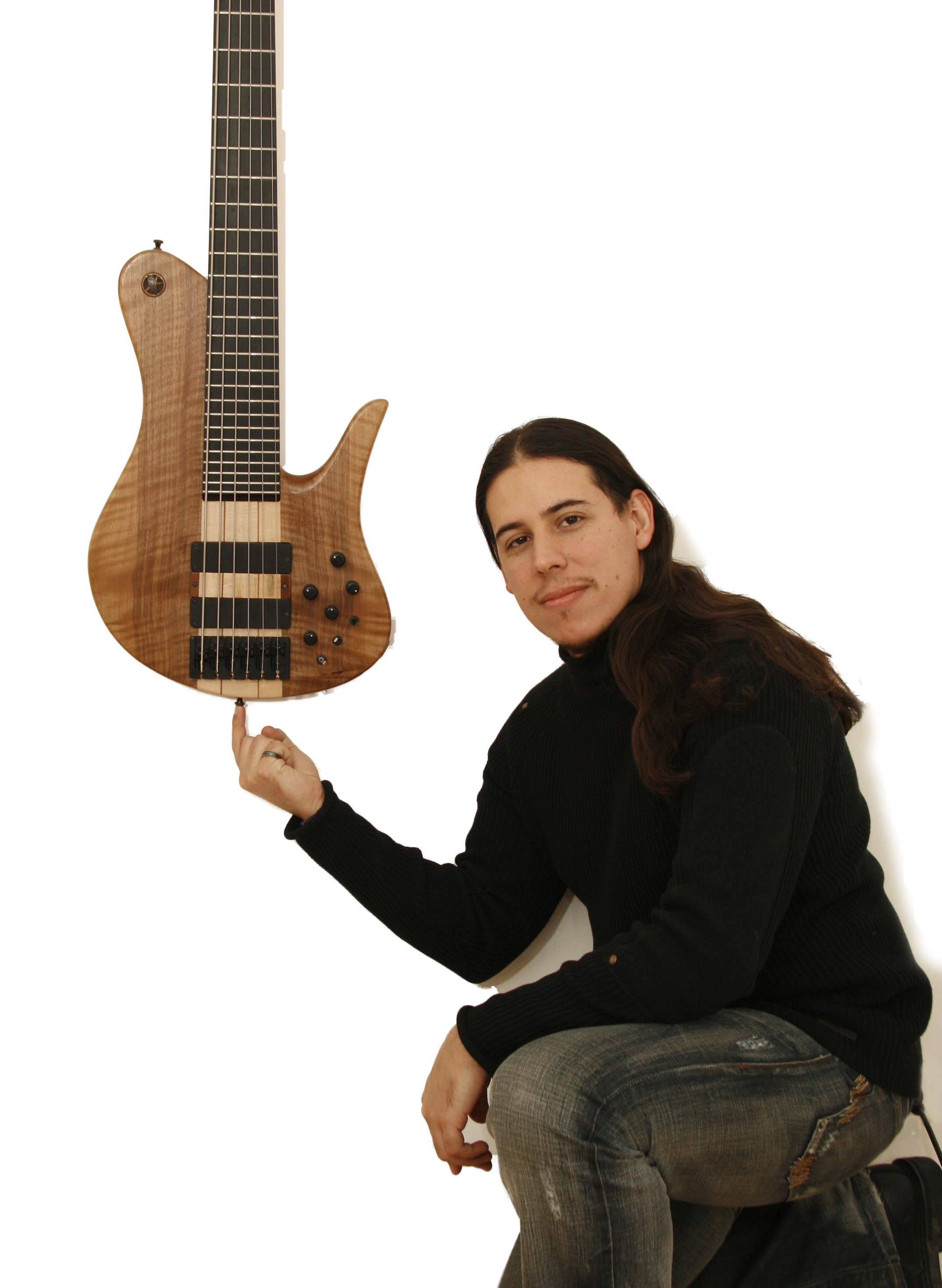

Background information
- Born: Juan Sebastian García-Herreros; July 1, 1977 (age 49); Bogotá, Colombia
- Genres: World music, Latin jazz, orchestral
- Occupations: Musician, record producer
- Instrument: Electric contrabass guitar
- Label: Inner Circle Music
- Website: the-snow-owl.com

Juan García-Herreros, also known as "The Snow Owl", is a Colombian bassist who plays a custom six-string electric bass guitar.

== History ==
Juan García-Herreros was born in Bogotá, Colombia. His first musical studies began with flute at the age 9 after moving to New York City with his family. Once he completed middle school his family relocated once again to Dunedin, Florida where he discovered the electric bass. There he also continued learning music at this time. Due to the fact that his family was unable to afford private lessons his passion for learning fueled him to become a self-taught musician, where he would discover the 6-string bass he is known so well for today. Juan was 16 when he began to teach music theory and jazz performance at Dunedin High School in Florida. His high-school band teacher encouraged him to also study acoustic bass so that he could be a part of the symphonic band in school. He auditioned and became proficient enough to perform with the Tampa Bay Symphony at 17 years of age.

At age 30, he was selected by a jury to become part of the faculty for the Jazz Institute of the Universität für Musik und darstellende Kunst Graz. He was the first Colombian to be honored with such an academic position in Austria. He left the Jazz Institute in the fall of 2012 due to a very busy touring schedule.

At age 37, he was nominated for a Latin Grammy Award in the category of Best Latin Jazz Album, for his third CD release entitled "Normas".

== Awards and honors ==
- 2006 Best Jazz Artist award, Jazz First, a cooperation between Jazzeit magazine, Quinton Records, and Erste Bank.
- Snow Owl, Quartet selected Critic's Choice in Germany by Bayerischer Rundfunk in 2006
- November 2008 – Hans Koller Preis CD of the Year for Martin Reiter's ALMA. The CD features Juan García-Herreros on "Pra Frederic".
- February 2009 Selected Projekt X-Change Ambassador to represent Colombia
- 2010 Art of Contrabass Guitar, Best Traditional Latin Jazz Album in America by O's Jazz newsletter.
- 2011 Austrian World Music Prize recipient with Mamadou Diabate's Percussion Mania.
- 2013 Art of Contrabass Guitar selected by Bass Musician magazine as one of the most 21 influential Latin Jazz CDs of the decade.
- 2014 Latin Grammy Nomination, Best Latin Jazz Album, Normas
- 2016 Global Music Awards Gold Medalist, World Jazz, The Blue Road
- 2016 Global Music Awards Gold Medalist, Best Album, The Blue Road
- 2016 Global Music Awards Gold Medalist, Best New Release 2016, The Blue Road
- 2016 Global Music Awards Bronze Medalist, Instrumental Music
- 2017 Quarterfinalist, Music Video Underground committee in Los Angeles, for his animated short film directorial debut of the song "She Became a Thousand Birds". The film is an homage to Omayra Sánchez and victims of the 1985 Armero tragedy in Colombia
- 2019: The best bass player in the world ^{[musicradar.com]}.

== Filmography ==
Year	Title	Role	Notes
2012	Hollywood in Vienna	Electric Bass	Music of Lalo Schifrin
2013	Hollywood in Vienna	Electric Bass	Music of James Horner
2014	Hollywood in Vienna	Electric Bass	Music of Randy Newman
2015	Hollywood in Vienna	Electric Bass	Music of James Newton Howard
2016	Hollywood in Vienna	Electric Bass	Music of Alexandre Desplat
2017	Hollywood in Vienna	Electric Bass	Music of Danny Elfman
2017	She Became a Thousand Birds	Director	Animated Short Music Film
2024	Dune: Part Two	Electric bass, solo double bass	Music of Hans Zimmer

== Discography ==
The Blue Road (Feistritz Castle, Sankt Peter am Kammersberg, AUT)

- Released: July 12, 2016
- Format: CD
- Label: Inner Circle Music
- Producer: Juan García-Herreros
- Tracks: 11

Normas (Home Music Studio Vienna, AUT)

- Released: November 7, 2013
- Format: CD
- Label: Inner Circle Music
- Producer: Juan García-Herreros
- Chart position: No. 3 U.S. Jazz Charts
- Tracks: 7

Art of Contrabass Guitar (Avatar Studios New York City)

- Released: February 1, 2010
- Format: CD
- Label: Inner Circle Music
- Producer: Juan García-Herreros
- Tracks: 10

Snow Owl Quartet (4 Tune Studios Vienna, AUT)

- Released: September 1, 2006
- Format: CD
- Label: Quinton Records
- Producer: Andreas Rathammer & Heinrich Schläfer
