= Yacouba Sissoko =

Mali kora player

- Born: Kita, Mali
- Genres: Music of Mali, world music, jazz music, pop music, R&B, classical music
- Instrument: kora
- Labels: Electric Honey
- Member of: Siya
- Formerly of: Fula Flute
- Website: yacousiskora.com

Yacouba Sissoko is a Mali kora player, best known for his collaborations with jazz and pop musicians. Born in Mali, he now lives in Harlem in New York City.

Sissiko was born in Kita to a well-known Bambara family of djelis. He began learning the kora and its associated oral tradition at age nine from his grandfather. In his teens he began touring Mali. He moved to Bamako to attend the National Institute of the Arts. While at the NIA he, like his mother and grandmother, was part of L'Ensemble Instrumental National, and performed with Kandia Kouyate and Amy Koita. In 1993 he joined the internationally touring Ensemble Koteba, based in Abidjan.

In 1998, Sissiko relocated permanently to New York City. Since then he has been a performer in and leader of a variety of musical groups, including classical ensembles, Lenny Seidman's group Spoken Hand, and Baaba Maal's band. However, he is better known for collaboration with western pop and jazz musicians such as Regina Carter, Paul Simon, and Damon Albarn. He has performed at the Smithsonian Folklife Festival, Playboy Jazz Festival, Grant Park Music Festival, Portland Jazz Festival, Detroit Jazz Festival, Monterey Jazz Festival, and others. He has led educational sessions at the Weill Music Institute of Carnegie Hall and the Malcolm X and Dr. Betty Shabazz Memorial and Educational Center. He is also sometimes called upon to perform the traditional role of a djeli at weddings and baptisms in New York City's West African immigrant community.

== Discography ==
=== As leader/solo ===
- Ti Mangala Ki (with Fakoly Tamani) (2015)
- Siya (2017)
- Duwa Wu, Blessing (2023)

=== As collaborator ===
- Smithsonian Folkways – Badenya: Manden Jaliya in New York City (2002)
- Fula Flute (with Fula Flute) (2002)
- Smithsonian Folkways – Mali Lolo: Stars of Mali (2003)
- Gipsy Kings – Roots (2004)
- Ido Ziv – Assiya (2005)
- Pharaoh's Daughter – Haran (2007)
- Sidiki Conde – Sidiki (2008)
- Tom Rossi – Connections (2008)
- Mansa America (with Fula Flute) (2009)
- Abdoulaye Diabaté – Sara (2009)
- Regina Carter – Reverse Thread (2010)
- Jamie Saft – A Bag of Shells, track "Parliament" (2010)
- Rahim Alhaj – Little Earth (2010)
- Leni Stern – Sa Belle Belle Ba (2010)
- Paul Simon – So Beautiful or So What (2011)
- Disney Jazz, Vol. 1: Everybody Wants To Be a Cat (2011)
- Damon Albarn – Maison Des Jeunes, track "Chanson Denko Tapestry" (2013)
- Alex Skolnick – Planetary Coalition (2014)
- Kavita Shah – Visions (2014)
- Atropolis – KoraNYC (2015)
- Tamikrest – Kidal (2017)
- Fabrizio Cassol – Strange Fruit (2017)
- Jayme Stone, Yacouba Sissoko & Kavita Shah, Diyabarana (2018)
