= Lenny Seidman =

American drummer

- Born: Philadelphia, Pennsylvania, United States
- Occupations: Musician, composer
- Instrument: Tabla

Lenny Seidman (born in Philadelphia, Pennsylvania) is a tabla player, a composer, a co-director of the Spoken Hand Percussion Orchestra, and a World Music/Jazz curator at the Painted Bride Art Center in Philadelphia.

== History, ensembles, touring, teachers ==
Lenny Seidman is a tabla player, composer and teacher based in Philadelphia. For the past 30 years, his creative output has centered around the application of tabla to a wide range of interdisciplinary and intercultural settings.

The son of a cantor and choir leader, he graduated Temple University with a degree in accounting. Realizing that this was not his calling after a few years and after an equally discouraging stint in the army, he "dropped out" and began studying classical and jazz piano with aspirations of becoming a jazz pianist. Along the way, however, he experienced an epiphany in discovering Indian classical music and tabla in 1971. He immediately began studying tabla, first with Ishwarlal Misra followed by Chotelal Misra and Kiran Deshponde, all from Benares, India. Inspired by this rich, ancient musical culture and seeking deeper personal awareness of the world around him, he set off on several journeys to India, Nepal, Kashmir, Eastern and Western Europe, backpacking and hitchhiking with his tabla and quickly learning that music is the universal language no matter where he found himself. Playing tabla allowed him entry into many different communities even if he didn't speak the language.

His first formal entry into the magical world of music was working with improvisational musicians and dancers in Philadelphia. He was hooked. By the 80s, feeling the need to dig deeper into Indian rhythms, Lenny began learning the South Indian rhythm system with carnatic violinist Adrian L'Armand. At the same time, he had been expanding his creative vision by integrating analog electronic music (Serge Modular) with tabla and other percussion - composing and performing pieces for independent choreographers, dance companies and installation artists and for his own music ensembles, Lotus and Shamanistics, with such creative musicians including Jamaaladeen Tacuma, Ric Iannacone, Michael Daugherty and Toshi Makihara. Memorable events include week long solo performances at ARTPARK in Lewiston NY for an outdoor fabric installation in the woods by Elaine Crivelli, several performances in East and West Berlin with Group Motion Dance Theater Co. directed by Manfred and Brigitta Fischbeck and a collaboration with choreographer/dancer Benoit LaChambre at the Canada Dance Festival in Ottawa. He continued his tabla development with performances of North and South Indian classical music with L'Armand and with North Indian bansuri flutist, Paul John.

In 1991, Lenny became a student of tabla maestro and composer, Zakir Hussain in California that permanently cemented his commitment exclusively to tabla as his life's work moving forward. He subsequently designed, coordinated and performed in two intensive residencies led by Zakir and kathak dancer/choreographer, Antonia Minnecola, that involved 20 culturally diverse traditional hand drummers and dancers. This experience helped launch Seidman into dedicating himself to focusing on creating his own projects that bring cultures together.

A three-month residency in 1993 at the Headlands Center for the Arts in Sausalito, California provided Seidman a fertile cultural environment for continued study with Zakir, composing, collaborating with fellow residents and researching for what was to follow. In 1996, Spoken Hand Percussion Orchestra and the Lenny Seidman Tabla Choir were born. He was awarded a fellowship/residency at APPEX (Asian Pacific Performing Arts Exchange) hosted by UCLA in 1999, that monumentally expanding Lenny's aesthetic and world view. This intense six-week residency, curated and coordinated by Judy Mitoma, involved living, work-shopping and performing with a large group of traditional and contemporary drummers, choreographers, and theater artists from many Pacific Rim countries. The performances took place at UCLA and other venues in Los Angeles.

Lenny was co-director with Daryl Burgee of Spoken Hand Percussion Orchestra, unifying the drumming traditions of North Indian tabla, Afro-Cuban bata, Afro-Brazilian samba, and West African djembe into its own unique voice. Spoken Hand performed and conducted workshops extensively in university, festival and theater settings nationally for twenty years. Among their many accomplishments was a collaboration in 2002 with Zakir Hussain and pioneer hip-hop choreographer Rennie Harris' Puremovement in "Flammable Contents". Shortly after, Spoken Hand released its first CD and followed up with their "Skins & Songs" CD, a collaboration with Philip Hamilton's "Voices," with whom Lenny also performed in Poland. He completed a four-year international tour in 2007 with hip hop pioneer Rennie Harris' PureMovement epic piece, "Facing Mekka," as a musical collaborator. Seidman is director of the Lenny Seidman Tabla Choir and is an original member of Atzilut, the Middle Eastern Jewish/Arabic music ensemble noted for their "Concerts for Peace" performed at the United Nations, throughout the U.S., and Europe.

In other more recent projects, he was musical director and composer for Nadine Patterson's feature film, "Tango Macbeth" which screened internationally. He guest performed with the contemporary opera "Ghosts of Monticello" at Bucknell University in 2015 (Garrett Fisher (composer), Carmen Gillespie (librettist), and Emily Martin-Mobley (director)). In late 2015, he collaborated with butoh artist Michael Sakamoto with his tabla choir (Daniel Ando Scholnick and Mike Nevin) at the Barnes Foundation in Philadelphia.

By this time, Seidman had become hyper aware of the thread that was subconsciously weaving through his creative life over the past few decades - applying tabla to a multitude of collaborative inter cultural and interdisciplinary environments and reconciling all their inherent differences. The culmination of this formalized mission resulted in a 2017 project grant from Pew Center for Arts & Heritage to create and direct "ARC", a full-length contemporary suite merging the drumming traditions of tabla and taiko with choreography and dance representing Asia Pacific, African diasporic, hip hop and Western post modern. With substantial additional support from the William J. Cooper Foundation, the world premier took place at Swarthmore College in October, 2018. The cast consisted of Joe Small, Kristy Oshiro, Isaku Kageyama, Laurel Jenkins, Ani Gavino, Orlando Hunter, Daniel Ando Scholnick, Jonathan Marmor, and Seidman. A month long artist retreat at the Millay Colony for the Arts in Austerlitz, NY provided him uninterrupted time to develop his vision and compose music for this project.

Lenny had founded and coordinated several other ensembles along the way including the Shamanistics with Michael Daugherty and Ric Iannacone, and Splinter Group, a percussion/dance ensemble that included Rennie Harris, Roko Kawai, Grace Zarnoch-Green, Toshi Makihara, Joe Ruscitto and Branavan Ganesan. He has performed and/or recorded throughout the Americas, as well as abroad, with such music artists including Zakir Hussain, Kenny Endo, Simon Shaheen, Yacouba Sissoko; LL Cool J, Kenny Muhammad, I Dewa Puta Berata; Butch Morris, Yair Dalal, Kyaw Kyaw Naing, Elio Villafranca, Papo Vazquez, Adam Rudolph, Joe Small and poet Ursula Rucker.

He has also collaborated with many choreographers including Cynthia Lee, Viji Rao, Helmut Gottschild, Christine Cox, Nina Martin, Myra Bazell, Eko Supriyanto, Cheng-Chieh Yu, Sen Hea Ha, Ananya Chatterjea, Kim Arrow, and Pallabi Chakrobarty. He was a guest artist at Swarthmore College Department of Music and Dance from 1998 to 2012 teaching tabla, collaborating with their gamelan orchestra and taiko ensemble, and the kathak dance classes. Lenny has given workshops nationally, teaches tabla and rhythm theory privately, and has been the World Music and Jazz curator at the Painted Bride Art Center in Philadelphia since 1986 having programmed over 400 concerts, residencies and educational outreach activities. He continues to perform for South Asian community events.

== Grants, fellowships, commissions, residencies, awards ==
Lenny's creative work has been supported by the Pennsylvania Council on the Arts, Independence Foundation, National Endowment for the Arts, Rockefeller Foundation's MAP Fund, William J. Cooper Foundation and Pew Center for Arts and Heritage. He was commissioned by Phrenic New Ballet to compose a new piece for choreographer Christine Cox's "Tabula Rasa," and by Kim Arrow for his "Quasimodo in the Outback". He was awarded the APPEX Fellowship in 1999, a six-week inter-cultural residency at UCLA where he collaborated and lived with 30 performing artists from throughout Asia. He also was awarded a three-month residency at Headlands Center for the Arts in Sausalito, CA in 1993. Seidman completed a month-long artist retreat at The Millay Colony for the Arts in April 2017, and was awarded a project grant from the Pew Center for Arts & Heritage to develop "ARC", a performance suite that brings together the drumming traditions of tabla and taiko along with the added dimension of dance.

== Compositions ==
- "Rain Man of Fitz. Mercy" - Composed in honor of his brother, Murray, who was murdered in early 2011. This piece was performed by Spoken Hand Percussion Orchestra in May 2011.
- "Taal of the Wild" - Commissioned by the Independence Foundation. "Taal"(or tala) refers to the rhythmic system of Indian music. This piece was inspired by his trek into the Himalayas in Kashmir, and features themes and variations of a phrase played at 4 to the beat and 7 to the beat. "Taal of the Wild" is part of Spoken Hand Percussion Orchestra's repertory, and has also been performed by the APPEX Percussion Ensemble at the Japan/American Theatre in Los Angeles.
- "Bendir, Done Dat" - Composed for Spoken Hand Percussion Orchestra. Features a trio of Bendir(frame drum with snare) players. It is now part of Spoken Hand's repertory.
- "Peshkar" - Composed for Spoken Hand. Peshkar is one of the primary compositional forms in the classical tabla repertoire. It is now in the Spoken Hand repertory.
- "Mudra Hang" - Commissioned by choreographer Kim Arrow for his multimedia work, "Quasimodo in the Outback". Composed for the tabla choir, this suite collaborates with both live and animated dance.
- "Dha Funk" - Inspired by the work of South Indian violin master L.Shankar, this 19-beat cycle gets tongue-in-cheek treatment in a call-and-response recitation of the tabla drum strokes. "Dha Funk" is part of Spoken Hand's repertory.
- "Skinful" - This Spoken Hand Percussion Orchestra repertory piece, in a cycle of 16 beats, merges both North Indian(Hindustani) and South Indian(Carnatic) rhythmic concepts, and features a Carnatic style of melodic instrument/drum interplay. "Skinful" was performed by the APPEX Percussion Ensemble at UCLA.
- "Haitian Taiko" - Composed for tabla and Swarthmore College's Taiko Ensemble. The primary rhythmic theme was inspired by an Afro/Haitian rhythm, developed for the tabla choir.
- "Batu-Batu Tukene" - Composed for tabla and Swarthmore College's Balinese Gamelan ensemble Semara Santi. Batu-Batu denotes a quick, repetitive drum pattern that supports a fast passage in a gamelan composition, and tukene is a 3 count tabla phrase. This piece merges both traditions in a contemporary format, set to a 6 beat cycle in a main subdivision of 9-7-5-3.
- "Dha Terekita Cak" - Composed for tabla and Semara Santi Gamelan Ensemble, this piece features the rhythmic recitation practices from the Balinese gamelan and North/South Indian drumming traditions conversing with each other.
- "Tabula Rasa" - Commissioned by Phrenic New Ballet, this piece was composed for choreographer Christine Cox. It was recorded in a recording studio suite consisting of multi-track tabla layers of various pitches, and included an abstract electronic music section.
- "Meet Mr. R" - A 75-minute solo piece performed by Seidman for tabla and frame drum approximately 12 times during 1994 and 1995 for Helmut Gottschild. "Meet Mr. R" performed at Oberlin College, Oberlin, Ohio; Allegheny College, Meadeville PA; University of the Arts Theater, Philadelphia PA and Painted Bride Art Center, and Philadelphia PA.
