= Xindong Bridge =

Bridge in Miaoli County, Taiwan

Xindong Bridge 新東大橋
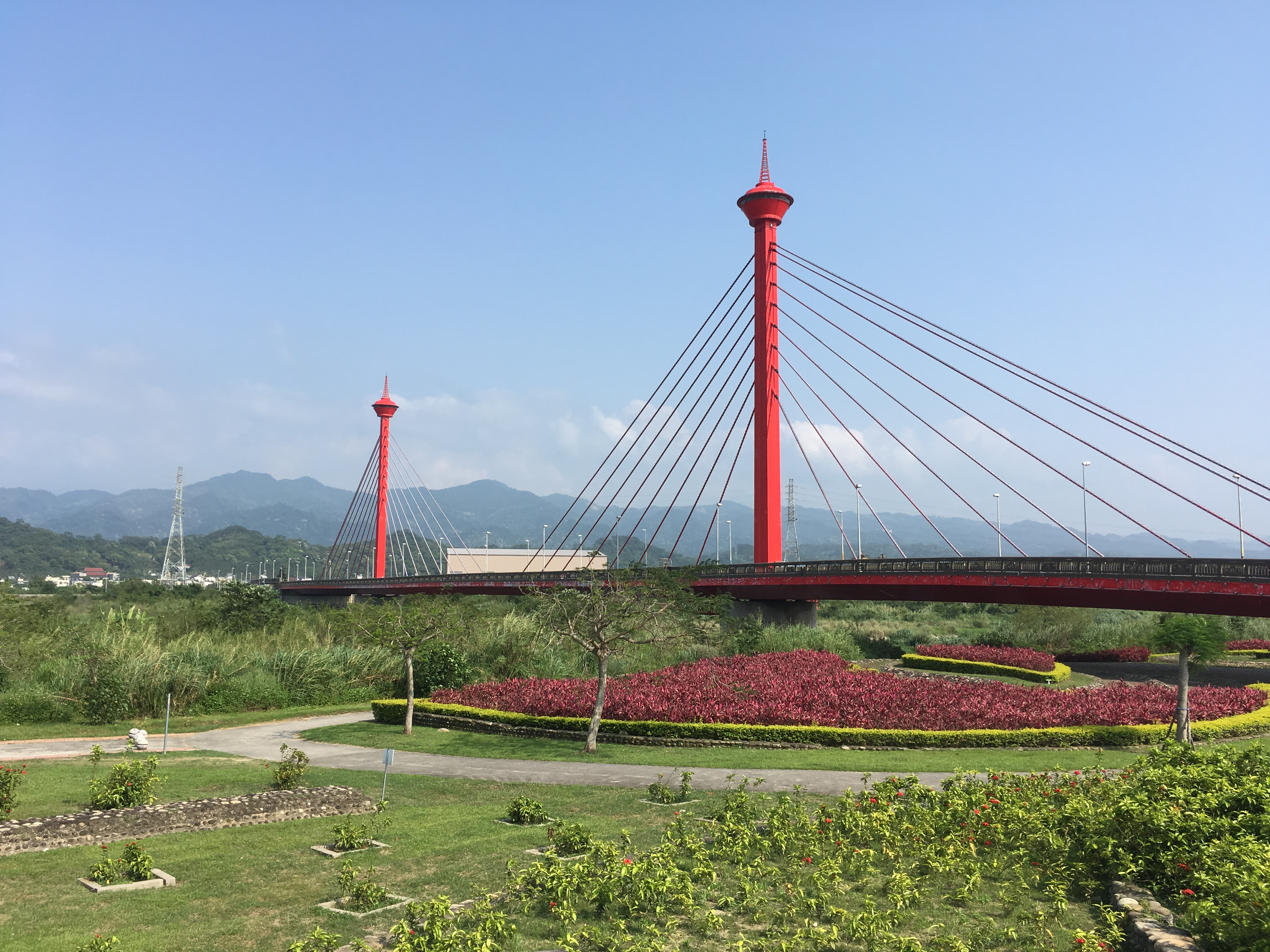
- Coordinates: 24°32′45.2″N 120°49′48.0″E
- Crosses: Houlong River
- Locale: Gongguan and Miaoli City in Miaoli County, Taiwan

Characteristics
- Design: bridge
- Total length: 326 metres (1,070 ft)
- Width: 21 m (69 ft)
- Longest span: 176 metres (577 ft)
- No. of lanes: 4

History
- Construction start: 1995
- Construction end: 1997

Location
- Interactive map of Xindong Bridge

The Xindong Bridge (traditional Chinese: 新東大橋; simplified Chinese: 新东大桥; pinyin: Xīndōng Dàqiáo) is a bridge connecting Gongguan Township and Miaoli City in Miaoli County, Taiwan.

== History ==
The construction of the bridge began in 1995 and was completed in 1997.

== Technical specifications ==
The total length of the bridge is 326 meters with its main span spans over a length of 176 meters. It carries 4 lanes of traffic in its 21 meters width and it crosses the Houlong River.

== See also ==
- List of bridges in Taiwan
