= Visions (Melissa Aldana album) =

Studio album by Melissa Aldana
- Released: May 24, 2019
- Recorded: September 14–15
- Studio: The Samurai Hotel
- Genre: Jazz
- Length: 67:34
- Label: Motéma Music
- Producer: Melissa Aldana and Jure Pukl

Melissa Aldana chronology
Back Home (2016)	Visions (2019)	12 Stars (2022)

Visions is a 2019 studio album by Melissa Aldana, released on the Motéma Music label, featuring music inspired by the life of the Latina painter Frida Kahlo. Three of the tracks on the album were originally on her suite “Visions: For Frida Kahlo”, which was commissioned by the Jazz Gallery.

== Critical reception ==
Professional ratings
Review scores
Source	Rating
Jazzwise	4/5 stars
PopMatters	7/10
Jazz Journal	3/5 stars

Will Layman, writing for PopMatters, stated that "The joy in Visions is in hearing the group interplay, the way that Aldana’s tunes and arrangements are about using the colors and personalities she has chosen for this project."

== Track listing ==
All tracks written by Melissa Aldana except as otherwise indicated

1. Visions – 8:13
2. Acceptance – 4:58
3. La Madrina – 6:03
4. Perdon (Pablo Menares) – 3:43
5. Abre Tus Ojos – 2:37
6. Elsewhere – 5:58
7. Dos Casas, Un Puente – 8:27
8. Never Let Me Go (Livingston & Evans) – 6:29
9. The Search – 6:30
10. Su Trajedia – 5:27
11. El Castillo De Velenje – 9:09

== Personnel ==
- Melissa Aldana – tenor saxophone
- Sam Harris – piano
- Pablo Menares – bass
- Tommy Crane – drums
- Joel Ross – vibraphone
