= Made in New York Jazz Festival and Competition =

The Made in New York Jazz Competition and Festival is a brand that started as a local festival in New York City and tristate area. In 2013 the brand introduced the first, online-based, global jazz competition, followed by the annual, International Jazz Gala at the Tribeca Performing Arts Center, Made In New York Jazz Festival in Montenegro and multiple independent shows mostly held in the US. The Brand debuted in 2010 and was founded by jazz aficionado, and music producer, Michael Brovkine.

== History ==
The idea of organizing a global, online jazz competition was the brainchild of a musician and producer, Michael Brovkine. The concept was born in 2010, with the growing popularity of the internet, but it took another three years and the use of social media for the first competition to come to fruition.

In January 2013, The Made in New York Jazz Competition website launched, and by August 2013, the Competition had more than 250 registered artists and musicians representing 35 countries, and over 12,000 registered website users.

In May 2014, the first online-based, year-round jazz competition made its Gala Concert debut at the Tribeca Performing Arts Center, in New York City. Although the contest headquarters is located in New York, the contest itself occurs online. One of the unique aspects of the competition is that entries are accepted year-round, and winners are determined by the accumulation of votes received from online voters, committee members, and competition judges.

The Grand Prize for winning the contest includes $3,000 plus 10% of registration fees, round-trip ticket to the International Jazz Gala in New York as a performer (courtesy of Kawai Musical Instruments), various prizes from competition and gala sponsors, the opportunity to perform on stage with jazz legends, network with industry notables, and the chance to gain global exposure.

The competition gained popularity quickly, gaining over 30,000 registered jazz musicians and fans representing 50 countries around the globe.

In May 2016, Made In New York Jazz Competition launched the brand in Europe, in collaboration with Montenegrin publishing house, Rabbit Records and main partner, Capital Plaza, with an inauguration festival in Montenegro.

== Leadership and Board of Members ==
- Michael Brovkine: Founder & CEO
- Yaacov Mayman: Artistic Director
- Alexandra Djordjevic: Managing Director
- Vladimir Maraš: Affiliate Director, Montenegro
- Pablo Elorza: Affiliate Director, Argentina
- Mario Biondi: Honored International Artistic Advisor (2016-2017)

== Supporters, partners, and sponsors ==
- French Embassy in the United States
- German Mission in the United States
- Balassi Institute
- Consulate of Montenegro in the United States
- Onassis Cultural Center
- Bodossaki Foundation
- Kawai Musical Instruments
- Alex Soldier
- Andy Filimon Photography
- Mario Biondi
- Cantamessa
- Gismart
- Synthogy
- Impression Cymbals
- Intellectsoft
- Capital Plaza
- Renault
- Hipotekarna Banka
- Telenor
- Adriatic Properties
- CdM Media
- Montenegro Ministry of Culture
- Hotel Ziya
- Yamaha/Eurounit
- Hard Rock Café
- Ethno Jazz Club Sejdefa
- US Embassy in Montenegro
- Porto Montenegro

== Performers and gala hosts ==
=== First Annual Jazz Gala 2014 (New York) ===
- Lenny White, Multi-Grammy Award Winner
- Randy Brecker, Multi-Grammy Award Winner
- Anita Vitale, Competition winner
- Evgeny Lebedev, Second Place winner
- Vladimir Maras
- Migayel Voskanyan and Friends
- Ricardo Baldaci
- Pablo Elorza
- Nick Vintskevich

=== Jazz Gala 2015 (New York) ===
- Randy Brecker, Multi-Grammy Award Winner
- Bobby Sanabria, Grammy Award nominee
- Alex Blake
- Yaacov Mayman
- Eden Rabin International Project, Competition winner
- Jan Prax Quartet
- Polly Gibbons
- Uraz Kivaner
- Thana Alexa
- Sinan Alimanović

=== Jazz Gala 2016 (New York) ===
- Rufus Reid
- Philip Harper
- Tommy Campbell
- Bobby Sanabria, Grammy Award nominee
- George V. Johnson Jr.
- Federico Malaman
- Yaacov Mayman
- Giulia Malaspina
- Karim Maurice
- The Next Step Quintet
- Diogo Monzo
- João Barradas, Competition winner

==== Made In New York Jazz Festival 2016 (Montenegro) ====
- Randy Brecker, Multi-Grammy Award Winner
- Bobby Sanabria, Grammy Award Nominee
- Edsel Gomez, Grammy Award Nominee
- Yaacov Mayman
- Anita Vitale
- George V. Johnson Jr.
- Essiet Essiet
- Vladimir Maras
- Nick and Leonid Vintskevich
- Ljuba Paunic
- Sule Jovovic
- Perunicic Miladin
- Ivan Aleksijevic

=== Jazz Gala 2017 (New York) ===
- Lenny White
- John Benitez
- Roberto Quintero
- Yaacov Mayman
- Juan Ibarra
- Antonino Restuccia
- Santiago Beis
- Barbie Camion
- Esra Kayıkçı
- Pamai Chirdkiatisak
- Victoria Petrovskaya
- Alexis Baro
- Vaja Mania
- Papuna Sharikadze
- Jorge Luis Pacheco

==== 2nd Made In New York Jazz Festival 2017 (Montenegro) ====
- Mike Stern
- Alex Blake
- Wayne Escoffery
- Yaacov Mayman
- Jerome Jennings
- Sharon Clark
- Sule Jovovic
- Aleksandar Grujic
- Vasil Hadzimanov
- Rick Swann
- João Barradas

==== 5th Anniversary Jazz Gala 2018 (New York) ====
- John Patitucci
- Randy Brecker
- Francisco Mela
- Yaacov Mayman
- Vladimir Maras
- Lauren Sevian
- Alexa Tarantino
- JD Warren & The Rudiment
- Jesús Javier Molina Acosta
- Michal Martyniuk
- Michael Moody

==== 3rd Made In New York Jazz Festival 2018 (Montenegro) ====
- Dave Weckl
- Richie Goods
- Raymond Angry
- Yaacov Mayman
- Igmar Thomas
- Caloé
- Jorge Luis Pacheco
- Brianna Thomas
- Ivan Aleksijevic
- Sule Jovovic
- Max Kochetov
- Ivan Ilic

==== 6th Annual Jazz Gala 2019 (New York) ====
- Al Foster
- John Lee
- Bobby Sanabria
- Yaacov Mayman
- Anthony Wonsey
- Alex Norris
- Alexey Alexandrov
- Pureum Jin
- David Marino
- Shuo-Kuan Shiao
- Nuci Nebieridze
- Alex's Sipiagin NYU Jazz Ensemble

==== 4th Made In New York Jazz Festival 2019 (Montenegro) ====
- Lenny White
- Bill Evans (saxophonist)
- Ameen Saleem
- Charenee Wade
- Polly Gibbons
- Hermin Deurloo
- Pippo Corvino
- Sule Jovovic
- Yaacov Mayman
- Vladimir Maras
- Axel Tosca
- Vasil Hadzimanov
- Vladimir Krnetic

==== 5th Made In New York Jazz Festival 2020 (Montenegro) ====
- Tommy Campbell
- Calvin Jones
- Marianne Solivan
- Yaacov Mayman
- Stafford Hunter
- Matija Dedic
- Sara Jovovic
- Rastko Obradovic
- Sule Jovovic
- Filip Bulatovich

==== 6th Made In New York Jazz Festival 2022 (Montenegro) ====
- Stanley Jordan
- Lezlie Harrison
- John Lee
- Vincent Ector
- Cyrus Chestnut
- Yaacov Mayman
- Freddie Hendrix
- Pedja Milutinovic
- Sule Jovovic
- Enes Tahirović

==== 7th Made In New York Jazz Festival 2022 (Montenegro) ====
10 Days fest.

- Camille Thurman
- Allan Harris
- Benny Benack III
- Russell Hall
- Jesús Molina
- Yaacov Mayman
- Darrell Green
- Ben Kraef
- Filip Bulatovic
- Shule Jovovic
- John Lee
- Freddie Hendrix
- Cyrus Chestnut
- Lezlie Harrison
- Stanley Jordan
- Vince Ector

==== 8th Made In New York Jazz Festival 2023 (Montenegro) ====
- Dennis Chambers
- Santi Debriano
- Dee Dee Bridgewater
- Bisera veletanlić
- Ashley Pezzotti
- Aaron Goldberg
- Alexis Baro
- Vasil Hadzimanov
- Yaacov Mayman
- Sule Jovovich
- Goran Potich

==== 9th Made In New York Jazz Festival 2024 (Montenegro) ====
- Nathan East
- Jeff "Tain" Watts
- Frank Gambale
- Kennedy Kennedy
- Ekep Nkwelle
- Noa East
- Michal Martyniuk
- Luis Bonilla
- Yaacov Mayman
- Milan Pavkovic
- Filip Bulatovic
- Sule Jovovic
- Branko Sterpin

== Categories ==
- Solo Instrumental
- Solo Vocal
- Small Band
- Composer
- Arrangement

== Grand Prize Winners ==
- 2014: Anita Vitale, Italy
- 2015: Eden Rabin International Project with artists from Israel, Germany, United States and Chile
- 2016: João Barradas, Portugal
- 2017: European Jazz Trumpet, France
- 2017: LSAT Duo Lauren Sevian and Alexa Tarantino United States
- 2018: Alexey Alexandrov, United States
- 2024: Who Parked The Car, France

== Judges ==
=== 2014 ===
- Randy Brecker, 18 times nominated 6 time Grammy Award winner trumpet player
- Joe Lovano, Grammy Award winner
- Lenny White, 3 times Grammy Award Winner jazz fusion drummer

=== 2015 ===
- Randy Brecker 18 times nominated 6 time Grammy Award winner trumpet player r
- Joe Lovano Grammy Award winner
- Lenny White 3 times Grammy Award Winner jazz fusion drummer

=== 2016 ===
- Randy Brecker 18 times nominated 6 time Grammy Award winner trumpet player
- Mike Stern, six-time Grammy Award nominee, jazz guitarist
- Lenny White 3 times Grammy Award Winner jazz fusion drummer

=== 2017 ===
- Randy Brecker 18 times nominated 6 time Grammy Award winner trumpet player
- Mike Stern, six-time Grammy Award nominee, jazz guitarist
- Lenny White 3 times Grammy Award Winner jazz fusion drummer

=== 2018 ===
- Randy Brecker 18 times nominated 6 time Grammy Award winner trumpet player
- Mike Stern, six-time Grammy Award nominee, jazz guitarist
- Lenny White 3 times Grammy Award Winner jazz fusion drummer
