= Yuhan Su =

- Born: Gongguan, Miaoli, Taiwan
- Genres: Jazz
- Occupation: Musician
- Instrument: Vibraphone
- Years active: 2013–present
- Labels: Inner Circle Music, Sunnyside Records
- Website: www.yuhansu.com

Chinese name
- Traditional Chinese: 蘇郁涵
Transcriptions

Yuhan Su (蘇郁涵) is a jazz vibraphonist and composer based in New York City. Born in Gongguan, Miaoli, Taiwan, she moved to Taipei when she was 18 and later to the United States from Taiwan in 2008 to study at Berklee College of Music.

== Discography ==
=== As leader ===
- Flying Alone (Inner Circle Music, 2008)
  - with Rafael Aguiar on alto saxophone; Cesar Joaniquet on tenor and soprano saxophones, Publio Delgado on guitar, Christian Li on piano, Jeong Lim Yang on acoustic bass and Deepak Gopinath on drums
- A Room of One's Own (Inner Circle Music, 2013)
  - with Matt Holman on trumpet, Kenji Herbert on guitar, Petros Klampanis on bass and Nathan Ellman-Bell on drums.
- City Animals (Sunnyside Records, 2018)
  - with Matt Holman on trumpet, Alex LoRe on alto saxophone, Petros Klampanis on bass and Nathan Ellman-Bell on drums

== Awards ==
Year	Award	Category	Recipients	Result	Ref.
2019	10th Golden Indie Music Awards	Best Album	City Animals	Won	
2019	10th Golden Indie Music Awards	Best Jazz Album	City Animals	Won	
2019	10th Golden Indie Music Awards	Best Musician	Yuhan Su	Nominated	
2019	10th Golden Indie Music Awards	Best Jazz Single	"Feet Dance"	Nominated	
