= Inner Circle Music =

American jazz record label

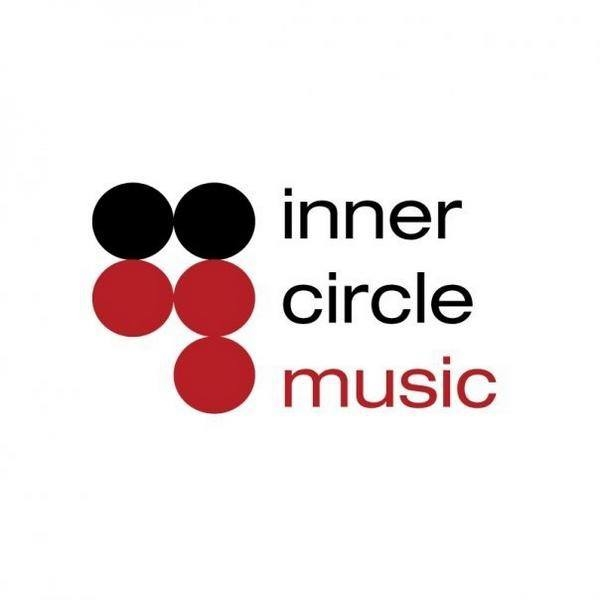
- Founded: 2007
- Founder: Greg Osby
- Genre: Jazz
- Country of origin: United States
- Location: New York City
- Official website: www.innercirclemusic.com

Inner Circle Music is an American jazz record label founded by Greg Osby in 2007.

After 15 albums with Blue Note Records, saxophonist Greg Osby left to start his own label. The label specializes in releasing self-produced works from artists from many different backgrounds and parts of the world. In 2008, its first album, 9 Levels, was released by Osby himself.

Inner Circle Music's roster includes Melissa Aldana, João Barradas, Ran Blake, Juan Garcia-Herreros, Petros Klampanis, Logan Richardson, Kavita Shah, Yuhan Su, Gabriel Vicéns, and James Weidman.

Since its founding, Inner Circle Music has released over 100 recordings. In 2016, All About Jazz noted that "Inner Circle Music is a prominent example of a label based on the ideas of creativity and community spirit." That same year, Jazz In Europe wrote, "This active jazz label represents Osby's eagerness to keep jazz alive by pushing forward new young talent in the hope of facilitating their professional careers across the globe."

== Discography ==
Title	Release date	Artist
9 Levels	2008	Greg Osby
Prologue	2008	Michael Pinto
Ethos	2008	Logan Richardson
Blueprint	2008	Lauren Sevian
Praia	2008	Sara Serpa
Dead Reckoning	2008	Jacob Yoffee
Day One	2008	Meilana Gillard
Three Worlds	2009	James Weidman
Go+	2010	Jangeun Bae
Art of Contrabass Guitar	2010	Snow Owl
Quare	2010	André Matos
Dreams	2010	Yukari
Camera Obscura	2010	Ran Blake and Sara Serpa
Wake Up, Fall Asleep	2010	Jangeun Bae
Go+	2010	Tammy Scheffer
Free Fall	2010	Melissa Aldana
Math Or Magic	2010	Evan Weiss
Ruminations	2011	Jason Yeager
Contextual	2011	Petros Klampanis
Mobile	2011	Sara Serpa
Flying Alone	2011	Yuhan Su
To Journal Square	2012	Russell Kirk
Organized Memories	2011	Ben Azar
Dear Abbey (The Music Of Abbey Lincoln)	2012	Teri Roiger
Girl From Queens	2012	Camille Gainer
Septagon	2012	Blake Meister
Second Cycle	2012	Melissa Aldana
Love's Last Lullaby	2013	Christian Li
Truth And Actuality	2013	The Aperturistic Trio
Normas	2013	Snow Owl
Lucid Dreamer	2013	Simona Premazzi
October Feeling	2014	James Weidman
Dream House	2014	Alex Lore
I Remember You	2014	John Menegon
Cimarrón	2014	Jorge Vistel
Primavera	2014	Sara Serpa and André Matos
Visions	2014	Kavita Shah
Affirmation	2014	Jason Yeager
Optics	2014	Alice Ricciardi
iRESI	2015	Carlos Averhoff Jr.
Minor Dispute	2015	Petros Klampanis
Selective Amnesia	2015	Adam Larson
Days	2015	Gabriel Vicéns
Roots	2015	Tomoko Omura
Pasos	2015	Maikel Vistel
La terra dei ciclopi	2016	Sade Farida
Mediterrana (Goddess Of Light)	2016	Lefteris Kordis
A Room Of One's Own	2016	Yuhan Su
The Blue Road	2016	Snow Owl
More Figs And Blue Things	2016	Alex Lore
The Way The Light Falls	2016	Kenji Herbert
At Risk	2016	Gary Thomas
Causes and Conditions	2017	Kevin B. Clark
Directions	2017	João Barradas
Tales & Tones	2017	Troy Roberts
Stories	2017	Viktorija Pilatovic
Post Bop Gypsies	2017	Tomoko Omura
Second City	2017	Adam Larson
Spiritual Impressions	2017	James Weidman
Polygon	2017	Eric Hove
Jazz Meets Cuban Timba	2018	Carlos Averhoff Jr.
Spillimacheen	2018	Matt Choboter
The Only Light	2019	Viktorija Pilatovic
Caruma	2019	Ricardo Pinheiro
Portrait	2020	João Barradas
Rec·i·proc·i·ty	2020	George Burton
Reflections Of The Eternal Line	2020	Greg Osby, Florian Arbenz, and Stephan Spicher
Dedications	2020	Michel El Malem
The Way We Are Created	2021	Gabriel Vicéns
Living In Shadows And Light	2021	Fabiana Martone
Speleology	2021	Nicola Guida
Dança Do Pólen	2022	Ricardo Pinheiro
