= Kavita Shah =

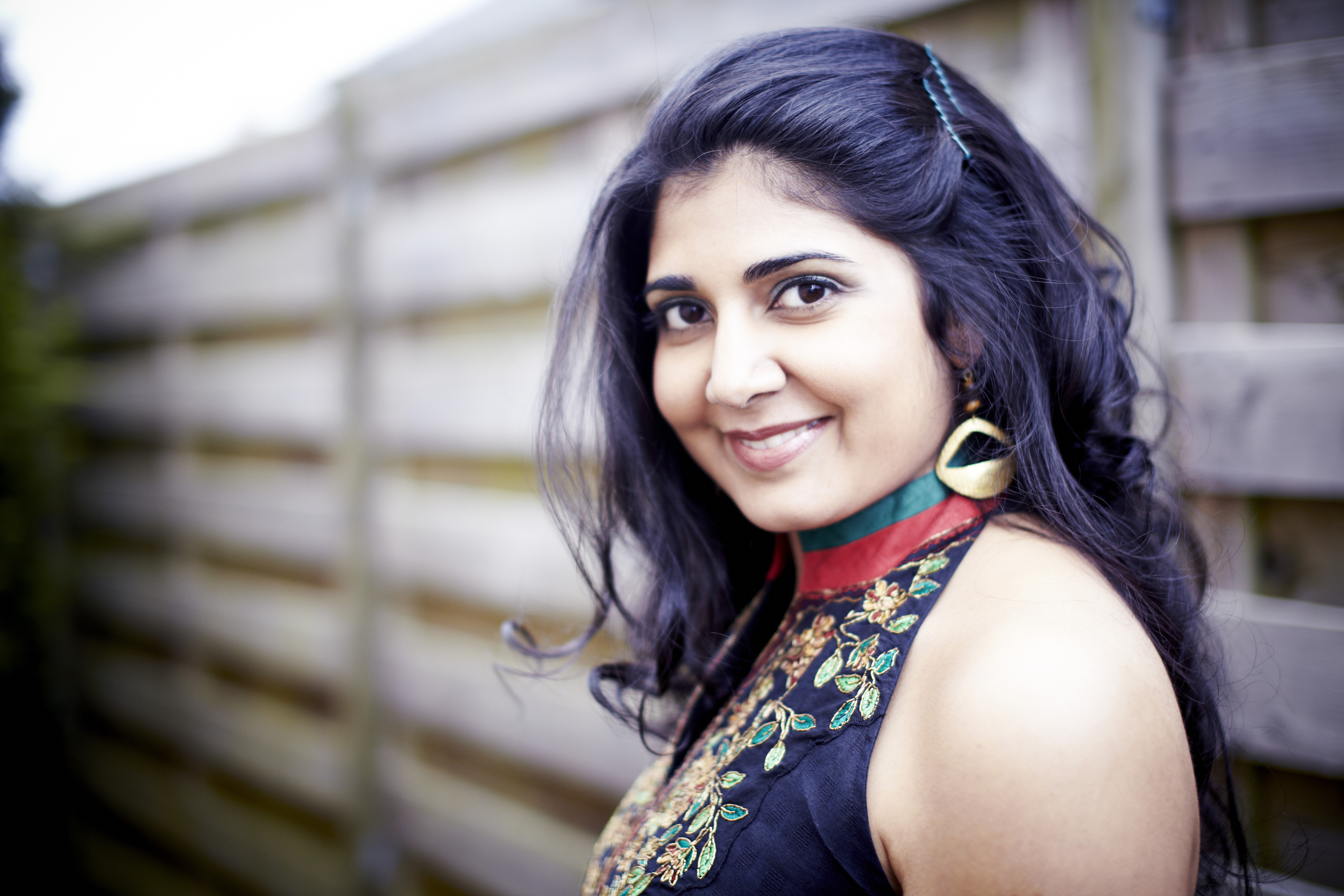
- Kavita Shah

Background information
- Origin: New York, NY, USA
- Genres: Jazz, Brazilian, World music, morna
- Occupations: Singer, composer, producer, arranger
- Instruments: Voice, piano, ukulele
- Labels: Folkalist Records, Naïve, Inner Circle Music
- Website: kavitashahmusic.com

Kavita Shah is a vocalist and composer from New York, NY. She has been hailed by NPR for possessing an “amazing dexterity with musical languages”.

== Early years ==
Shah's family is of Gujarati origin, and her parents are originally from Mumbai, India.

Raised in Manhattan, Shah began her musical training in classical piano at age 5. She spent her formative years performing regularly at Carnegie Hall and Lincoln Center as a member of the prestigious Young People's Chorus of New York City, with whom she trained in styles ranging from opera to gospel to folk music in more than 20 languages. She traces her commitment to jazz to the childhood influence of uptown saxophonist Patience Higgins, a former neighbor whose band she would later join at Harlem venues including like Minton's and the Lenox Lounge.

Shah attended New York City public schools, and became fluent in Spanish at the age of 16 after living with a host family in Ecuador. She went on to major in Latin American Studies at Harvard College, where she also studied Yorùbá and became fluent in Portuguese and French. During her undergraduate years, Shah lived abroad in Perú, China, and Brazil, where she conducted fieldwork on Afro-Brazilian music and politics; her honors thesis "Experiments with Transnationalism: Constructing Diaspora in the bloco-afro Malê Debalê” was awarded the Kenneth D. Maxwell Thesis Prize in Brazilian Studies and the Cultural Agents Thesis Prize. While at Harvard, she also received the Cecília Meireles Prize and the David McCord Prize.

After college, Shah briefly worked at The Nation magazine and Human Rights Watch, before a chance meeting with NEA Jazz Master Sheila Jordan on the New York City Subway would steer her toward a career in music. She earned a Master's in Jazz Voice from Manhattan School of Music.

== Music ==
Shah has performed her music at leading festivals, concert halls and venues on six continents, including the Kennedy Center, Art Basel: Miami, Rochester Jazz Festival, San Jose Jazz Festival, Melbourne Jazz Festival, Park Avenue Armory, Blue Note, Joe's Pub, Blue Whale, Vermont Jazz Center, Philadelphia Museum of Art, the Rubin Museum of Art, and Copenhagen Jazz Festival.

She has worked with Lionel Loueke, Sheila Jordan, Martial Solal, François Moutin, Greg Osby, Steve Wilson, Alune Wade (Senegal), and Mulatu Astatke.

She was named “Best Graduate Jazz Vocalist” by Downbeat in 2012 and won the ASCAP Herb Alpert Young Jazz Composers Award in 2013.

Shah's 2014 debut album, Visions, was produced by Benin-born jazz guitarist Lionel Loueke, and released on saxophonist Greg Osby's record label Inner Circle Music. "Visions" integrates a jazz quintet with the West African kora and Indian tabla, and includes special guests Loueke (guitar, vocals), Steve Wilson (saxophone, flute), and Rogerio Boccato (percussion).

In 2017, Shah premiered the contemporary work "Folk Songs of Naboréa: a song-cycle for seven voices” at the Park Avenue Armory. The concert was named by NPR critic Nate Chinen as one of the Top 10 Performances of the year.

In 2018, Shah released Interplay, a bass-and-voice duo album co-led by François Moutin, on Dot Time Records. The album features standards and originals, and includes improvisation; Moutin and Shah are joined on two tracks by pianist Martial Solal and vocalist Sheila Jordan. The DownBeat review of the release commented on "Moutin's dark, reedy bass acting like a dance partner to Shah's pliant, flickering vocals, which retain a tonal richness even through passages of extreme agility." Jazz Times also described the album as "a stellar rapport" between the duo who "are fearless in their interpretations".

In 2019, she sang on composer Miho Hazama's "Dancer in Nowhere," which was nominated for a GRAMMY for Best Large Ensemble Jazz Album.

After 7 years of research on the Atlantic island of São Vicente, Cape Verde, she released Cape Verdean Blues in 2023, a tribute to her idol Cesária Évora in collaboration with guitarist Bau (Cesária's former musical director) and Miroca Paris. The album explores traditional mornas and coladeiras from Cabo Verde. It was hailed by the Guardian as "gorgeous" and by the New York Times as "quietly riveting."

== Discography ==
=== As leader ===
- Kavita Shah, Cape Verdean Blues (Folkalist Records, 2023), with Bau & Miroca Paris.
- Kavita Shah, Visions (Inner Circle Music, 2014), co-produced by Lionel Loueke.

=== As co-leader ===
- Kavita Shah & François Moutin, Interplay (Dot Time Records, 2018), with special guests Sheila Jordan & Martial Solal.

=== As sideperson ===
- Kenny Barron, Songbook (Artwork Records, 2025).
- Jayme Stone & Yacouba Sissoko, Diyabarana (Folklife, 2023).
- Steve Newcomb, Pluto and the Sun (2022).
- Saawee, Saawee (미러볼 뮤직, 2021).
- Miho Hazama & m-unit, Dancer in Nowhere (Universal Japan, 2018).
- Fredy Guzmán, Waijazz, produced by Lionel Loueke (2015).
- Jay Sand, All Around this World: South and Central Asia Vol. 1, produced by Samir Chatterjee (2015).
- Steve Newcomb Orchestra, Caterpillar Chronicles (Listen Hear, 2012).
