= Gongguan, Miaoli =

Rural township in Miaoli County, Taiwan

Coordinates: 24.505269°N 120.844749°E

Gongguan Township 公館鄉
- Rural township
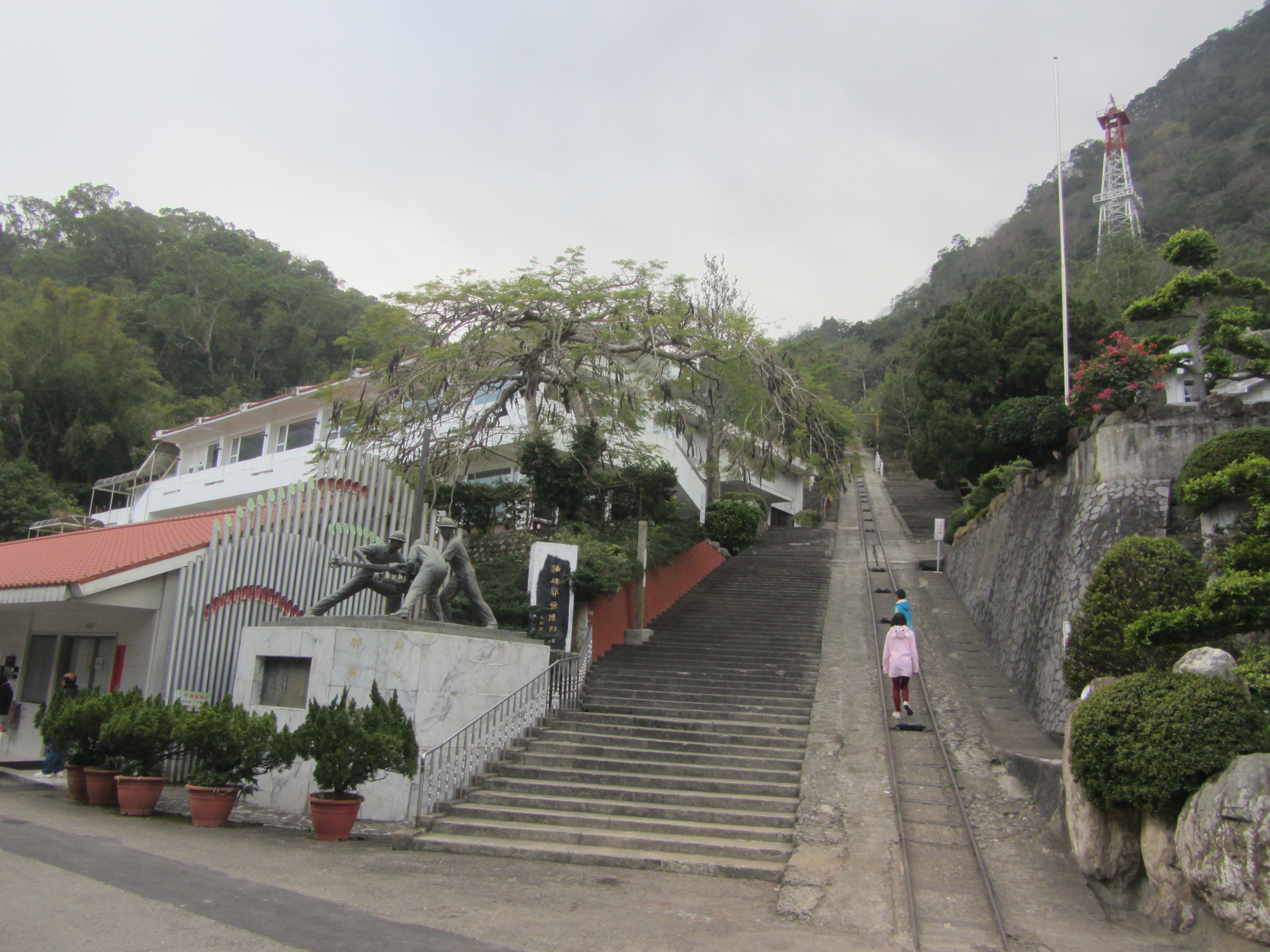

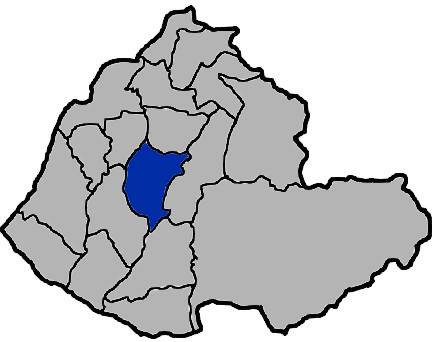
- Gongguan Township in Miaoli County
- Location: Miaoli County, Taiwan

Area
  - Total: 71 km^{2} (27 sq mi)

Population (September 2023)
  - Total: 31,327
  - Density: 440/km^{2} (1,100/sq mi)
- Website: www.kungkuan.gov.tw (in Chinese)

Gongguan Township (Chinese: 公館鄉; pinyin: Gōngguǎn Xiāng) is a rural township near the center of Miaoli County, Taiwan. Its climate is sub-tropical, mild and very rainy. The yearly average humidity is 80%.

== Geography ==
Gongguan occupies an area of 71.45 square kilometres (27.59 sq mi). As of September 2023, it had 10,980 households and a total population of 31,327.

== Administrative divisions ==
The township comprises 19 villages: Beihe, Dakeng, Fude, Fuji, Fuxing, Guannan, Guantung, Guanzhong, Hegang, Heshan, Jianshan, Kaikuang, Nanhe, Renan, Shiqiang, Wugu, Yugu, Yuquan and Zhongyi.

== Politics ==
The township is part of Miaoli County Constituency II electoral district for Legislative Yuan.

== Economy ==
Oil and gas has been discovered and explored in the area since more than a century ago.

== Transportation ==
- United Bus Gongguan Station
- Hsinchu Bus Gongguan Station
- Sun Yat-sen Freeway Miaoli Interchange
- Ta1 6 Line
- County Road 128:Tongxiao － Sihu Hsiang Shuijiapu － Tongluo Hsiang － Gongguan Hsiang
- Miao 26-2:Miaoli City Sindong Street—Sindong Bridge－Gongguan Hsiang Beihe—Siyi Tunnel—Shihtan Hsiang
- Tai 72:EXPRESSWAY Houlong - Wenshui
- County Road 119甲:Kesu Bridge—Gongguan Along Mountain Way
- Xindong Bridge

== Tourist attractions ==
- Miaoli Ceramics Museum
- Taiwan Oil Field Exhibition Hall
- Wugu Cultural Village
- Taiwan Seri-Apiculture and Entomology Education Park

== Notable natives ==
- Yang Jih-sung, former forensic scientist
- Yuhan Su, jazz vibraphonist and composer

== Climate ==
Climate data for Gongguan, Miaoli (1991–2020 normals, extremes 1995–present)
Month	Jan	Feb	Mar	Apr	May	Jun	Jul	Aug	Sep	Oct	Nov	Dec	Year
Record high °C (°F)	31.3 (88.3)	34.0 (93.2)	33.8 (92.8)	37.0 (98.6)	38.0 (100.4)	38.1 (100.6)	39.2 (102.6)	39.9 (103.8)	40.0 (104.0)	37.3 (99.1)	34.1 (93.4)	31.3 (88.3)	40.0 (104.0)
Mean daily maximum °C (°F)	19.9 (67.8)	20.3 (68.5)	22.7 (72.9)	26.6 (79.9)	29.7 (85.5)	32.0 (89.6)	33.3 (91.9)	32.7 (90.9)	31.6 (88.9)	28.8 (83.8)	25.8 (78.4)	21.8 (71.2)	27.1 (80.8)
Daily mean °C (°F)	15.0 (59.0)	15.6 (60.1)	17.8 (64.0)	21.7 (71.1)	25.0 (77.0)	27.4 (81.3)	28.4 (83.1)	27.9 (82.2)	26.4 (79.5)	23.5 (74.3)	20.5 (68.9)	16.8 (62.2)	22.2 (71.9)
Mean daily minimum °C (°F)	11.6 (52.9)	12.2 (54.0)	14.3 (57.7)	18.0 (64.4)	21.3 (70.3)	24.0 (75.2)	24.8 (76.6)	24.5 (76.1)	22.7 (72.9)	19.7 (67.5)	16.7 (62.1)	13.0 (55.4)	18.6 (65.4)
Record low °C (°F)	1.4 (34.5)	3.6 (38.5)	5.1 (41.2)	6.8 (44.2)	12.4 (54.3)	16.4 (61.5)	21.8 (71.2)	21.6 (70.9)	16.4 (61.5)	9.9 (49.8)	5.8 (42.4)	1.9 (35.4)	1.4 (34.5)
Average precipitation mm (inches)	52.5 (2.07)	85.9 (3.38)	130.9 (5.15)	146.3 (5.76)	217.5 (8.56)	282.8 (11.13)	198.0 (7.80)	283.3 (11.15)	167.6 (6.60)	38.1 (1.50)	34.3 (1.35)	40.6 (1.60)	1,677.8 (66.05)
Average precipitation days	6.2	7.6	10.1	9.6	10.3	11.6	9.0	11.4	7.2	3.4	4.7	5.9	97
Average relative humidity (%)	83.0	84.4	83.6	82.8	82.4	80.1	80.1	82.7	84.1	81.3	81.8	81.4	82.3
Mean monthly sunshine hours	135.1	112.7	145.2	155.7	178.1	198.5	229.1	210.8	214.5	212.5	162.1	143.5	2,097.8
Source: Central Weather Administration (precipitation days 1995–2020, sun 2008–2020)
