= Yang Jih-sung =

Taiwanese forensic scientist

- 楊日松
- Born: 23 November 1927; Kōkan, Byōritsu, Shinchiku Prefecture, Taiwan, Empire of Japan (today Gongguan, Miaoli, Taiwan)
- Died: 23 November 2011 (aged 84); Da'an, Taipei, Taiwan
- Citizenship: Empire of Japan (until 1945); Republic of China (from 1945)
- Education: National Taiwan University (MD)
- Scientific career
- Fields: forensics

Yang Jih-sung (Chinese: 楊日松; pinyin: Yáng Rìsōng; 23 November 1927 – 23 November 2011) was a Taiwanese forensic scientist.

== Career ==
Born in Miaoli County to a family of Hakka descent on 23 November 1927, Yang earned a degree from the National Taiwan University College of Medicine. At his graduation, Yang was the only member of his class to have been trained in forensics, a field he sought to pursue after seeing his brother jailed due to a coerced confession and a friend's subsequent wrongful conviction on charges of theft. Yang solved his first case while still a student in 1949. Due to Yang's efforts, the survivor of a suspected double suicide by hanging later admitted to murdering his girlfriend and forging a suicide note. He also assisted in solving the 1977 death of Chang Ming-fong. Suspect Lin Hsien-kun sexually assaulted Chang before killing and dismembering the victim, resulting in Taiwan's first homicide involving dismemberment. The 1990 death of Iguchi Mariko remained unsolved until the next year, when the body was discovered and Yang joined the case. For his work, the University of Tokyo granted Yang an honorary doctorate. In 1993, Yang found that Republic of China Marine Corps Captain Yin Ching-feng had been killed before an unknown suspect attempted to cover up Yin's death by throwing the body into the ocean. The investigation launched by Yin's murder subsequently uncovered the La Fayette-class frigate scandal which dated back to 1991.

Yang Jih-sung was called to investigate the 1997 murder of Pai Hsiao-yen, and retired the next year. Over the course of his career, Yang Jih-sung allegedly handled over 30,000 bodies and was frequently compared to Sherlock Holmes and Bao Zheng. He was also known for his refusal to wear protective gear on the job. In retirement, Yang became a consultant for the Institute of Forensic Medicine. In 2004, he was named to a commission convened to investigate the 3-19 shooting incident. Yang died of colon cancer at Cathay General Hospital in Taipei on his 84th birthday in 2011.

One of Yang's children, Yang Wen-hsien, later participated in a new investigation into the Yin murder.
