= Houlong River =

Coordinates: 24.6153°N 120.7528°E

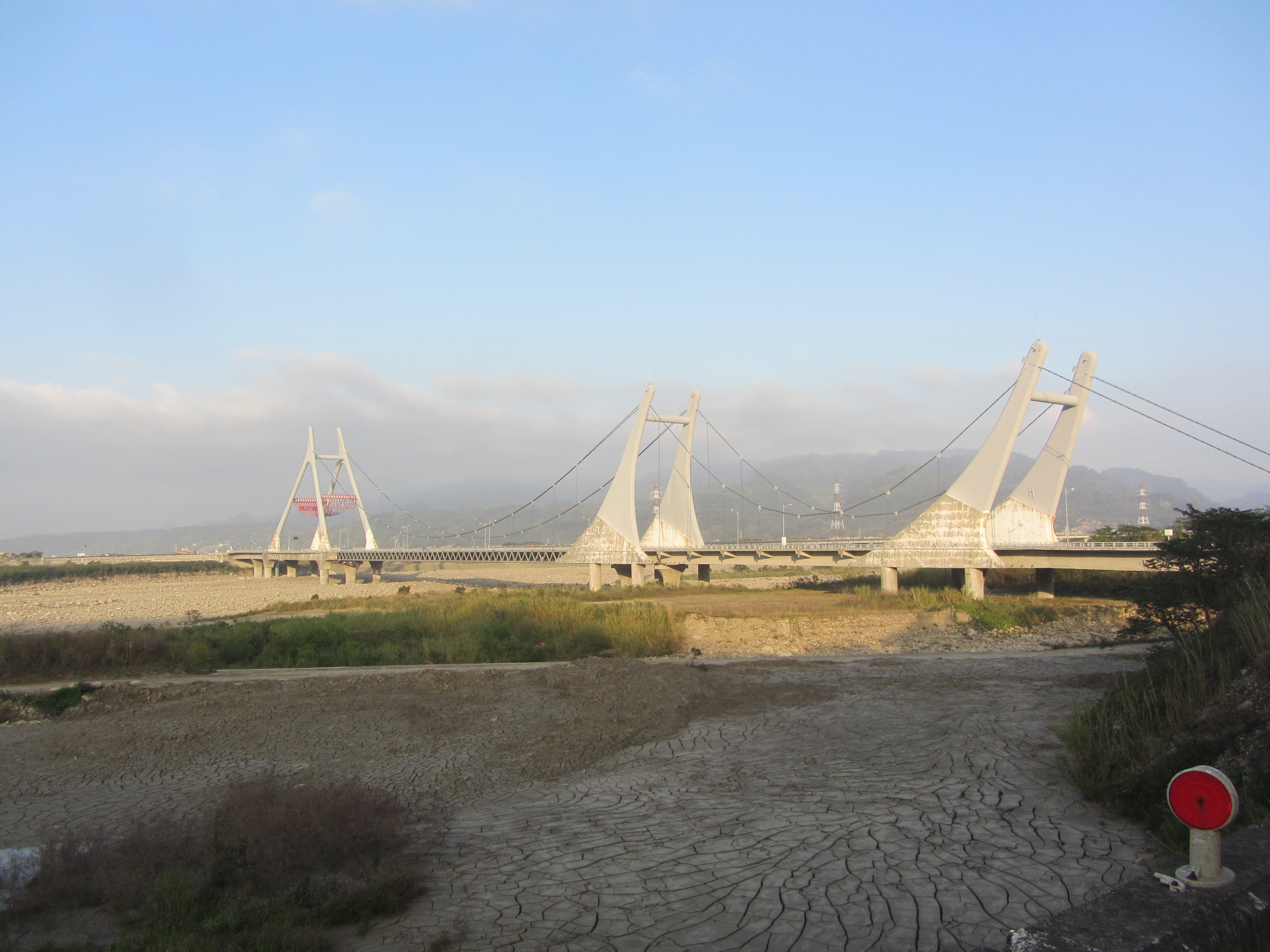
- Hakka Bridge over Houlong River

- Houlong River in Taiwan
- Native name: 後龍溪 (Chinese)

Location
- Country: Taiwan

Physical characteristics
- Source
  - location: Jiali Mountain (加里山)
- Mouth
  - location: Taiwan Strait: Miaoli County
- Length: 58.3 km (36.2 mi)
- Basin size: 536.59 km^{2} (207.18 sq mi)

The Houlong River (Chinese: 後龍溪; pinyin: Hòulóng Xī; Wade–Giles: Hou^{4}-lung^{2} Hsi^{1}) is a river in northwestern Taiwan. It flows through Miaoli County for 58 kilometers.

== Bridges ==
- Xindong Bridge

== See also ==
- List of rivers in Taiwan
