= Wugu Cultural Village =

Cultural center in Gongguan, Miaoli County, Taiwan

- 五榖文化村
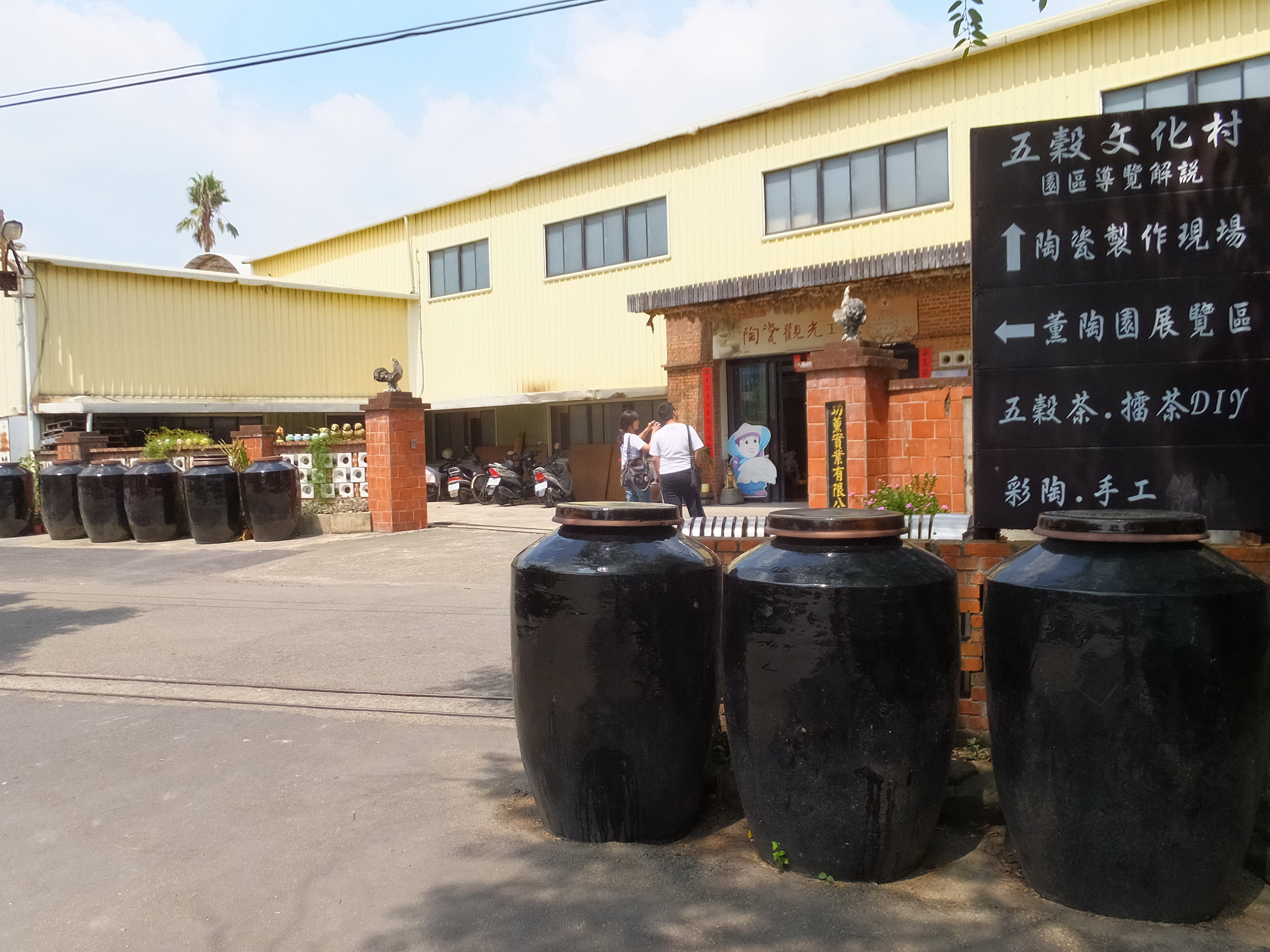
- Interactive map of Wugu Cultural Village
- Location: Gongguan, Miaoli County, Taiwan
- Coordinates: 24°31′3.1″N 120°49′21.0″E
- Owner: Hsu Yong-huan
- Type: cultural center

Construction
- Opened: 2000

Website
- Official website (in Chinese)

The Wugu Cultural Village (traditional Chinese: 五榖文化村; simplified Chinese: 五谷文化村; pinyin: Wǔgǔ Wénhuà Cūn) is a cultural center about ceramics in Gongguan Township, Miaoli County, Taiwan.

== Name ==
The name Wugu was derived from the nearby temple name. It represents the Chinese agriculture with the meaning of "five grains", which are rice, wheat, corn, bluesteam grass and beans.

== History ==
The center was originally established in 1987 as a ceramic manufacturing company under the name Gong Hsun Enterprise Co. (Chinese: 功薰陶瓷公司) by renting a courtyard house as their factory facility. Many of its products were exported to the United States and Europe. Due to the growing demand of their products, the factory had to be relocated to its present location in 1990 and more of its manufacturing process became automated. Along the way, the founder decided to turn the company into a tourism factory. The factory was redesigned to suit tourist visits. The center was then opened in 2000 under the name Wugu Cultural Village.

After the signing of Economic Cooperation Framework Agreement on 29 June 2010 between Mainland China and Taiwan, the center faces tougher competition from the cheaper mainland products. In 2011, the center requested assistance from the Industrial Technology Research Institute. Subsequently, the center signed a technology transfer agreement with the institute and started to modify parts of the center facilities to manufacture ceramic knives.

== Architecture ==
The center spans over an area of 1.55 hectares and divided into seven sections in a Hakka architectural style, which are Bamboo Rice Pavilion, Granary Pavilion, Hakka Cultural Relics Pavilion, Silk Pavilion and Smoked Pottery Garden. It also features a souvenir shop.

== Exhibitions ==
The center is the combination of industry, economy and culture-themed tourism. It showcases the traditional ceramics industry, Hakka rice and silk artworks from its 200 ceramic products display. It exhibits the tools used by farmers and daily utensils used by local residents. The center is decorated with various kinds of pottery urns at its yards.

== Activities ==
The center offers hands-on activities, such as ceramic paintings, cookie, ground tea, Hakka snacks and Hakka baozi making.

== Visitors ==
The center currently receives around 400,000 visitors annually.

== Transportation ==
The center is accessible from Tongluo Station of Taiwan Railway.

== See also ==
- List of tourist attractions in Taiwan
