= Gabriel Vicéns =

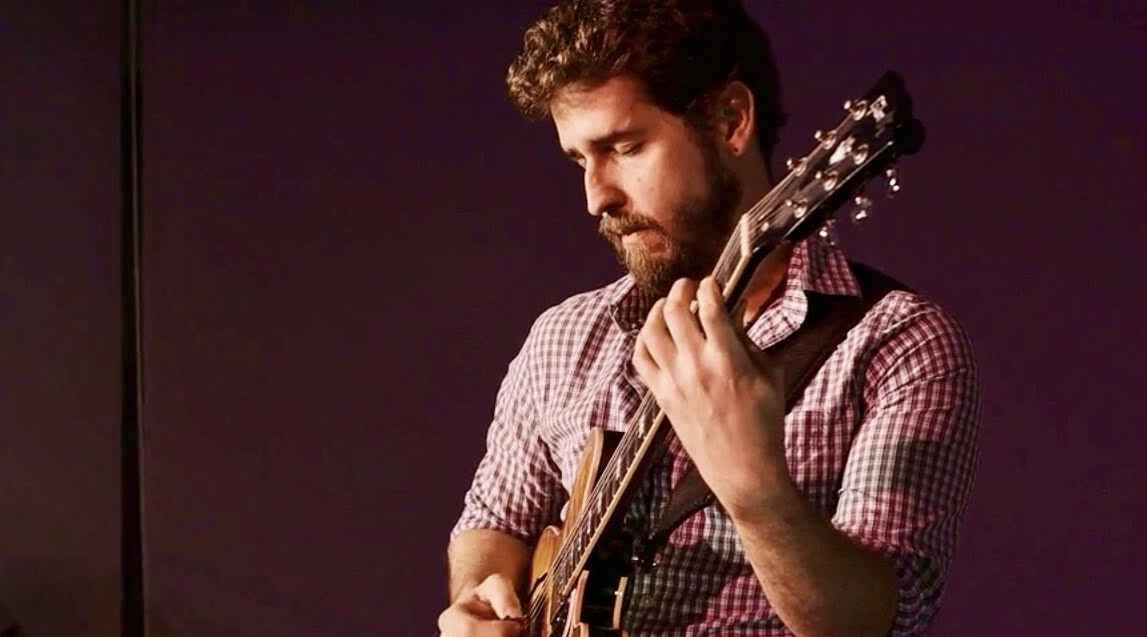
- Vicéns performing at the SFJAZZ Center, 2018

Background information
- Born: March 16, 1988 (age 38); Guaynabo, Puerto Rico
- Genres: Jazz, Experimental, Classical
- Occupation: Musician
- Instrument: Guitar
- Years active: 2005–present
- Label: Clepsydra Records Inner Circle Music Setola di Maiale Stradivarius
- Website: www.gabrielvicens.com

Gabriel Vicéns (born March 16, 1988) is a Puerto Rican guitarist, composer, and producer, as well as a bandleader, educator, and visual artist based in New York City.

== Early life and education ==
Born and raised in Guaynabo, Puerto Rico, Vicéns began his musical training at the age of 14 and soon performed jazz in local clubs. He attended the Conservatorio de Música de Puerto Rico, where he earned a Bachelor of Music in Jazz and Caribbean Music studies, graduating summa cum laude in 2010 as the program's first guitarist.

In 2016, he moved to New York City and attended Queens College, where he received a Master of Music in 2017. Between 2019 and 2021, Vicéns studied painting at The Art Students League of New York with Pat Lipsky.

In 2022, he earned a Doctor of Musical Arts in Jazz Studies and Performance from Stony Brook University, where he studied under Ray Anderson. His guitar teachers include Fernando Mattina and Paul Bollenback, and he studied composition with Carlos Cabrer, Daria Semegen, Lois V Vierk, and Antoine Beuger.

== Career ==
Vicéns leads several ensembles and has collaborated with artists including Eddie Gómez, David Sánchez, Alex Sipiagin, and Miguel Zenón. He became an adjunct professor at the Interamerican University of Puerto Rico at age 24, where he taught private guitar lessons until 2015.

He has released five studio albums as a leader: Point In Time (2012), Days (2015), The Way We Are Created (2021), Mural (2024), and Niebla (2026). His second and third albums were released on Greg Osby's Inner Circle Music. Mural, issued by the Milan-based label Stradivarius, consists of contemporary chamber works. Niebla was released on his own label, Clepsydra Records.

Vicéns is also co-leader of the free improvisation group No Base Trio, formed in 2010 in San Juan, Puerto Rico. The trio has released two albums on the label Setola di Maiale: No Base Trio (2020) and NBT II (2022).

His compositions are published by Edition Wandelweiser and Edition Musicali Stradivarius.

In 2023, he received a Chamber Music America New Jazz Works award. His work has been reviewed in publications such as DownBeat, JazzTimes, Fanfare, American Record Guide, All About Jazz, Jazzwise, Musica Jazz, Jazz Journal, Neue Musikzeitung, Blow Up, Jazz Inside, El Nuevo Día, El Vocero, and Fundación Nacional para la Cultura Popular.

== Recordings and reception ==
Gabriel Vicéns’s debut album Point in Time (2012) was described by Bill Milkowski of JazzTimes as the work of a “leading light of Puerto Rico’s jazz scene,” noting its modernist sensibility, warm-toned guitar style, and comparisons to contemporary jazz guitarists such as Kurt Rosenwinkel, Mike Moreno, and Ben Monder. Writing in All About Jazz, Dan Bilawsky highlighted Vicéns’s decision to remain in Puerto Rico for his studies rather than attend Berklee College of Music, describing the album as reflecting an emerging compositional identity characterized by patience, maturity, and strong ensemble interplay with alto saxophonist Jonathan Suazo. In JAZZIZ, James Rozzi highlighted the album’s “beautifully crafted” modern compositions and the band’s “stellar” performances, noting the presence of guest musicians including tenor saxophonist David Sánchez and bassist Eddie Gómez.

Vicéns’s second album Days (2015) has been described by Mark F. Turner of All About Jazz as combining post-bop jazz with rock-influenced energy and Latin rhythmic elements, featuring musicians including saxophonist David Sánchez and trumpeter Alex Sipiagin. Turner highlighted its melodic hooks, ensemble interplay, and extended improvisational structures, while Scott Yanow of DownBeat characterized Vicéns as a “thoughtful improviser” working within a modern post-bop framework. Writing in Jazz Podium, Alexander Schmitz emphasized Vicéns’s collaborative approach, describing him as a “team player” whose music avoids stylistic clichés and reflects a transnational modern jazz aesthetic.

Gabriel Vicéns’s album The Way We Are Created (2021), reviewed by Mark Sullivan of All About Jazz and Mike Hobart of Jazzwise, draws on Afro-Caribbean musical traditions, particularly Puerto Rican bomba and plena, as well as elements of Cuban changüí. Critics described the album as integrating these influences into a contemporary jazz framework through ostinato-based structures, rhythmic grooves, and coordinated ensemble writing. Hobart also noted influences from New York jazz figures such as Greg Osby and Miguel Zenón, highlighting a “painterly” compositional approach marked by contrast and clarity of ensemble interaction. Writing in Jazz Journal, Roger Farbey emphasized Vicéns’s melodic guitar approach, often favoring single-note lines over chordal textures, and noted elements drawn from folk, Latin, and popular music, as well as careful attention to ensemble balance and arrangement.

Vicéns’s chamber music work Mural (2024) has been discussed in relation to contemporary classical traditions. Critics including Gary Higginson of MusicWeb International and David DeBoor Canfield of Fanfare have identified influences from Morton Feldman, Anton Webern, and Arnold Schoenberg, particularly in the use of sparse textures, pointillistic writing, and an emphasis on timbre, silence, and spatial organization. The work has been described as “evocative and arresting” and “immersive and mood-inducing.” Writing in American Record Guide, Rob Haskins emphasized Vicéns’s attention to sonic detail, likening aspects of the music to “sounding sculptures,” and highlighted its formal processes of accumulation and dissolution, as well as its use of fragmentation and shifting textures.

His later album Niebla (2026) has received attention from jazz and mainstream critics for its stylistic diversity and contrast-driven structure. Ammar Kalia of The Guardian described it as “a joyous journey through Latin bomba rhythm and the intricate ensemble sound” of Vicéns’s sextet. Writing in JazzTimes, Eric Snider characterized the album as “high-minded music rife with extremes,” highlighting its combination of complex polyrhythms, angular melodic writing, and extended passages of silence and spatial openness. In DownBeat, Josef Woodard emphasized the album’s integration of jazz, contemporary classical elements, and Puerto Rican musical heritage, as well as its conceptual influences drawn from visual art and cinema, citing figures such as Mark Rothko, Michelangelo Antonioni, and Tsai Ming-liang, and describing the work as a cohesive yet exploratory and poetic musical statement.

== No Base Trio ==
Gabriel Vicéns is a co-leader of the No Base Trio, an experimental trio consisting of Vicéns on guitar, alto saxophonist Jonathan Suazo (also synthesizer and EWI), and drummer Leonardo Osuna.

The trio’s music is entirely collectively improvised and emphasizes extended-form development, timbral exploration, and dense rhythmic interaction, with reviewers noting the absence of a bass instrument as central to its sound.

The group’s 2020 debut album was described in All About Jazz as featuring an “eerie sumptuousness” and a “gravity-free, genre-less sound” characterized by shifting sonic textures and open-form improvisation. Writing in Avant Music News, Daniel Barbiero characterized the recording as attentively crafted improvised music shaped by an eclectic set of influences, with strong ensemble cohesion and forward motion despite its open structure. In The Free Jazz Collective, Paul Acquaro described the album as “a welcome surprise,” highlighting its blend of ambient rock textures, electronic elements, and free improvisation, and noting the trio’s evolution from a more traditional jazz format toward a layered, texturally driven approach.

Their second album, NBT II (2022), consists of extended collectively improvised performances with gradual structural evolution, alternating between restrained atmospheric passages and more intense, rhythmically dense sections. Writing in Jazz Journal, Roger Farbey described the album as a challenging but rewarding set of improvisations, highlighting the trio’s ability to listen and respond in real time and noting its emphasis on dynamic contrast and long-form development. In another review for All About Jazz, Mike Jurkovic characterized the recording as a “wholly improvised” and “immersive exploration” of open-ended and less categorized forms of jazz, noting its fluid expansion and contraction of musical ideas and its emphasis on abstraction, textural interplay, and expressive freedom.

== Selected works ==
- Carnal, for violin and piano (2019)
- Una Superficie Sin Rostro, for piano (2020)
- Sueños Ligados, for violin, cello, and piano (2020)
- Mural, for clarinet, violin, and piano (2021)
- La Esfera, for cello and piano (2021)
- Ficción, for flute, oboe, clarinet, bassoon, and horn (2021)
- El Matorral, for flute, clarinet, violin, cello, piano, and vibraphone (2022)

== Discography ==
=== As leader ===
Release year	Title	Label	Personnel
2012	Point In Time	Self-Released	Gabriel Vicéns (guitar and compositions), Jonathan Suazo (alto saxophone), David Sánchez (tenor saxophone), Eduardo Zayas (piano), Eddie Gomez (bass), Matt Clohesy (bass), and Vladimir Coronel (drums)
2015	Days	Inner Circle Music	Gabriel Vicéns (guitar and compositions), Alex Sipiagin (trumpet and flugelhorn), Jonathan Suazo (alto saxophone), David Sánchez (tenor saxophone), Bienvenido Dinzey (piano), Leonardo Osuna (drums), and Paoli Mejias (percussion)
2021	The Way We Are Created	Inner Circle Music	Gabriel Vicéns (guitar and compositions), Roman Filiú (alto saxophone), Glenn Zaleski (piano), Rick Rosato (bass), E.J. Strickland (drums), and Victor Pablo (percussion)
2024	Mural	Stradivarius	Gabriel Vicéns (compositions), Roberta Michel (flute), Raissa Fahlman (clarinet), Joenne Dumitrascu (violin), Adrianne Munden-Dixon (violin), Rocío Díaz de Cossío (cello), Wick Simmons (cello), Julia Henderson (cello), Corinne Penner (piano), Mayumi Tsuchida (piano), Mikael Darmanie (piano), John Ling (vibraphone), David Bloom (conductor), and Nu Quintet
2026	Niebla	Clepsydra Records	Gabriel Vicéns (guitar and compositions), Roman Filiú (alto saxophone), Vitor Gonçalves (piano), Rick Rosato (bass), E.J. Strickland (drums), and Victor Pablo (percussion)

=== As co-leader ===
Release year	Artist	Title	Label	Personnel
2020	No Base Trio	No Base Trio	Setola di Maiale	Jonathan Suazo (alto saxophone), Gabriel Vicéns (guitar), and Leonardo Osuna (drums)
2022	No Base Trio	NBT II	Setola di Maiale	Jonathan Suazo (alto saxophone and flute), Gabriel Vicéns (guitar), and Leonardo Osuna (drums)

=== As sideman ===
Release year	Artist	Title	Label
2012	Jonathan Suazo	Extracts of a Desire	Self-Released
2012	SM Quinteto	Historias, Cuentos y Canciones	Self-Released
2012	Joan Torres' All Is Fused	Before	Self-Released
2014	5 Esquinas	Tamarindo	Self-Released
2014	Joan Torres' All Is Fused	The Beginning	Self-Released
2014	Jonathan Suazo	Vital	Self-Released
2016	Joan Torres' All Is Fused	Of the Musical	Self-Released
2018	Fernando García	Guasábara Puerto Rico	Zoho Music
2018	Pasha Karchevsky	Hope	Inner Circle Music
2019	Pablo Campos	Enfoque	Self-Released
2019	Joan Torres' All Is Fused	Revolution	Self-Released
2019	Andre Carvalho	Outside in Music, Vol. 3 - Live at Pinch Recording	Outside In Music
2022	Slavo Rican Assembly	Intercosmic	World Music Network
2023	Joan Torres' All Is Fused	Embrace Form	Self-Released
2023	Fernando García	Behique	Sunnyside Records
2023	Jonathan Suazo	Ricano	Ropeadope Records
2026	Fernando García	Yocahú	Pinch Records
