= MusicaNeo =

- Website type: Music and social networking
- Headquarters
- Owner: LoadCD GmbH
- Website: MusicaNeo.com
- Registration: Required (to post/upload)
- Launched: October 2003
- Current status: site not available

MusicaNeo is a global online music platform for free publishing and sale of digital sheet music and performing licenses. The platform caters for all categories of music lovers – professional composers, arrangers, teachers, conductors, text authors, editors, as well as amateur musicians.

== Backgrounds ==
The project was initiated and is maintained by Load.CD GmbH. This privately held company was founded by CEO Friedrich Kisters and has been operating since 2003. The main office is based in Kreuzlingen, Switzerland, but the project's team is international: it comprises music experts, content managers and programmers. Back in 2003, the project started under the name of Load.CD at a time when CDs were at peak. However, 2012 saw a complete rebranding of the platform, which, above substantial technical improvements, brought the change of name – MusicaNeo.

== Key features ==
Currently, more than 500 individual sellers are offering over 160 000 individual scores through MusicaNeo service. Every registered user is provided with a free personal website with a unique address where they can present professional and personal information, add images, articles and news, select a site design to their liking. Users can also upload, publish and sell sheet music due to a store function, which is integrated in each personal website. Uploaders maintain the full control of their materials and author's rights, they set the prices for music works themselves and can track the whole procedure from score download to fee pay-off. The earned money can be collected via one of the four payment methods – PayPal, WebMoney, Bank account or Cheque. Due to the international character the platform is multilingual and supports four languages – English, German, Russian and Portuguese.

== Musician community ==
MusicaNeo has established an active online community. Its members interact with each other in the site's Community section, with the help of site's tools, to exchange information, provide feedback, news, experience and share the site's content in popular social networks. Besides the Community section, the Music Jobs and Music Competitions features allow users to establish creative cooperation by posting job offers/vacancies and apply/post calls for various music contests currently being held worldwide.

== Contemporary Composers Index ==
The CCI (Contemporary Composers Index) is a part of MusicaNeo project. It is a global online directory of contemporary composers that currently counts almost 15,000 entries of composers of all musical genres and styles worldwide. Each entry contains basic information about a composer, such as biographical data, origin, year of birth, occupation and music genre/genres he/she is working in. Entries are free of charge and are curated by composers themselves. CCI is an open index and can be extended by anyone. Users who would like to add a new composer to the list can fill in an inquiry form online.

== Ernst Levy collection ==
In cooperation with the "Universitätsbibliothek Basel" (University Library of Basel, Switzerland) and Frank Ezra Levy (an acknowledged composer and cellist), MusicaNeo digitalized the works of his father – a Swiss piano prodigy and inventive composer Ernst Levy.

The entire collection – original scores and manuscripts – has been transferred into digital format and is now available for download at MusicaNeo. There are over 450 works in the catalogue.
