= Pablo Elorza =

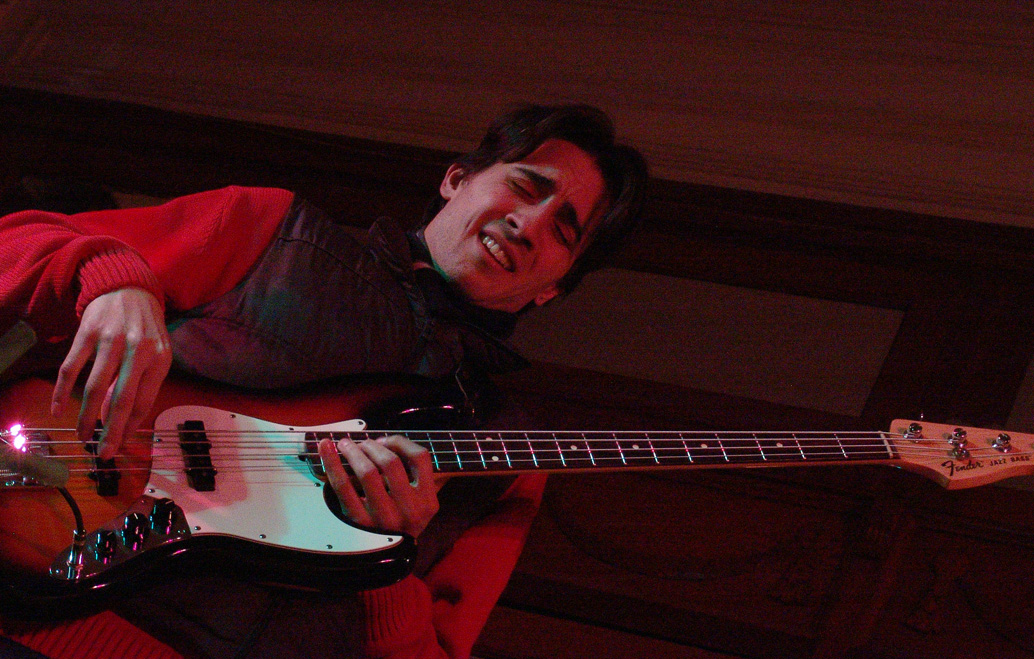
- Pablo Elorza playing at a Jazz Festival.

Background information
- Born: Pablo Elorza; June 10, 1982 (age 44); Villa María, Córdoba, Argentina.
- Genres: Jazz, jazz fusion, Tango, World Music
- Occupations: Musician, songwriter, producer, author, arranger, educator
- Instruments: Electric bass, upright bass
- Years active: 2004–present
- Website: www.pabloelorza.com

Pablo Elorza (born June 10, 1982 in Villa María, Córdoba, Argentina) is a bass player, composer, arranger, author, producer and educator.

== Biography ==
In 1998, influenced by his brother, began studying the bass guitar and popular music in EMPO. (School of Popular Music).

In 2000, and based in the city of Córdoba, extended for three years at the School of Music "La Colmena" and participates in seminars, clinics and private studies with teachers of music from the likes of Alejandro Herrera, Javier Malosetti, Dave Weckl, Guillermo Vadala, Chango Spasiuk, Lee Konitz, Ernesto Jodos, Nick Schneider, Steve Zenz, Fred Sturm, among others.

In 2003, begins with self-development and research on electric bass, resulting thus in a new teaching method "The Litlle String" published in the U.S. in 2007.

In 2004, he began his work as a session recording player for various artists of diverse genres such as rock, pop, folk, funk, jazz, Latin, kids music, fusion, folk song, soul, among others.

In 2007, he released his first solo album of contemporary jazz "The Other", which receives Docta award 2007 for Best Jazz "Solo Composition".

In 2008, and based in Buenos Aires, he wrote his first work of symphonic character "of Buenos Aires Astor" in tribute to Astor Piazzolla and has since made arrangements, orchestrations and written music for various formations and styles including String Quartet, musical comedy, jazz big band, jazz combo, concert band, trios, among others. His concert band arrangement of "Adios Nonino" by the Argentine bandoneon player Astor Piazzolla and his classical studies for Bass "5 Etudes for Electric Bass" also were published in the United States.

In 2010, released his second solo album Jazz "EPTrío - Vol1" searching for a new role for the electric bass. Using audio effects he created a sound similar to a wind instrument played in the context of traditional jazz trio accompanied by upright bass and drums.

In 2011, two of his compositions become part of the project Real Book Argentina, a collection of popular music written by Argentine authors of all generations.

In 2012, he recorded his third album "Japanese Garden" with a big band he called "Pablo Elorza Orchestra". This lineup was created in late 2011 bringing together a large group of Argentine jazz artists. The compositions of the album, all originals, can be framed within the genre fusion or world music with rhythmic elements from all over the world and the improvisational flavor of jazz.

In September of the same year he made the educational video "Deep Into Electric Bass Classics" analyzing Havona, the mythical theme by bassist Jaco Pastorius. Bassist and educator Jon Liebman chose it as "video of the week" in his famous digital community "For Bass Players Only".

== Discography ==
Solo:

Album	Year
Jardín Japonés	2012
E.P. Trio Vol.1	2010
El Otro	2007

Composer / Arranger / Sessionist:

Proyecto	Album	Año
Pablo Cordero	Vocabulario	2011
Sardina	Contra la corriente	2011
Agustin Strizzi	Will	2011
Santiago Hernández	Tramando Algo	2011
Federico Palmolella	Keep on Groovin´	2011
Laura Lotito	Peppermint	2011
Mirtha Perez Webber	Entre Espirales del Tiempo	2011
Coqui Dutto	Canciones de Cuna Vol.3	2008
Raúl Manfredini	El Duende de los Sueños	2008
Imagineros	Secretos de otros tiempos	2007
La Tumbada	La Tumbada	2005
La Chicharra Cantora	Conciertos Bichos	2004
