= Architextures =

Studio album by Vijay Iyer
- Released: October 13, 1998
- Recorded: August 5 and September 4, 1996
- Studio: OTR Studios, Belmont, CA
- Genre: Jazz
- Length: 1:04:02
- Label: Asian Improv Records AIR 0034
- Producer: Vijay Iyer

Vijay Iyer chronology
Memorophilia (1995)	Architextures (1998)	Panoptic Modes (2001)

Professional ratings
Review scores
Source	Rating
Allmusic	3/5 stars
Tom Hull	A–
The Penguin Guide to Jazz Recordings	3.5/4 stars

Architextures is the second studio album by American jazz pianist Vijay Iyer recorded with eight musicians. The album was released on October 13, 1998 via Asian Improv Records label. The tracks 3, 4, 7, 9 were recorded by a trio of Iyer, Brock, and Hargreaves. The tracks 2, 5, 6, 8, 10, 11 were recorded by an octet. The tracks 1 and 12 were recorded solo by Iyer.

== Reception ==
Robert Spencer of All About Jazz stated: "Vijay Iyer is 'one of the most fascinating jazz pianists around,' says Berkeley's East Bay Express, and I couldn't have said it better myself. It is getting ever more difficult to hear someone with something really new to say, but Architextures should establish Vijay Iyer as a pianist to be reckoned with... Architextures amply rewards repeated listens and has made me, for one, make a note to look out for the man's next disc and even greater things to come."

David R. Adler of Allmusic noted: "As on his debut, 1995's Memorophilia, Iyer is after a sound that combines modern jazz with elements inspired by the South Asian diaspora of which he is a part. The clearest references to non-Western music appear on 'Three Peas,' which features Mahanthappa and the two bassists. Otherwise, Iyer's multifarious influences are harder to separate or even detect, as they're deeply interwoven within the dense stew of rhythms and improvisational dialogues undertaken by both ensembles. There's an opaque quality and a relentless intensity in much of Iyer's music. Pianistically, he has something in common with non-traditional players such as Jason Moran and Ethan Iverson (neither of whom were prominent at the time of this recording). As a composer, Iyer draws upon figures such as Andrew Hill, Cecil Taylor, and Steve Coleman, but he is clearly arriving at his own highly complex style."

== Track listing ==
All tracks are written by Vijay Iyer.

No.	Title	Length
1.	"Prelude: Paradise Lost"	2:30
2.	"Meeting-of-Rivers"	8:36
3.	"Microchips and Bullock Carts"	6:02
4.	"Charms"	4:27
5.	"Sadhu"	7:18
6.	"Three Peas"	5:30
7.	"Trident"	6:41
8.	"Taste the Sea"	3:39
9.	"Los Ojos"	6:09
10.	"Utopia of a Tired Man"	4:45
11.	"Journey Over Sands"	5:58
12.	"Postlude: Prayer"	1:27
Total length:		1:04:02

== Personnel ==
Band

- Vijay Iyer – liner notes, mixing, piano, producer
- Jeff Brock – bass
- Eric Crystal – sax (soprano), sax (tenor)
- Liberty Ellman – guitar
- Brad Hargreaves – drums
- Aaron Stewart – sax (tenor)
- Rudresh Mahanthappa – sax (alto)
- Kevin Ellington Mingus – bass

Production

- Matt Levine – mastering
- Cookie Marenco – engineer, mixing
