= Tirtha =

Tirtha or Teertha may refer to:

- Teertha, Dharwad, village in Karnataka, India
- Tirtha (Hinduism), a pilgrimage center in Hinduism
- Tirtha (Jainism), a pilgrimage center in Jainism
- Tirtha (album), an album by pianist Vijay Iyer
- Theertham, holy water given at temples

== See also ==
- Tirthankara, a holy leader in Jainism
