= Memorophilia =

Studio album by Vijay Iyer
- Released: 1995
- Recorded: August & September, 1995
- Studio: OTR Studios, Belmont, California
- Genre: Jazz
- Length: 67:36
- Label: Asian Improv
- Producer: Vijay Iyer

Vijay Iyer chronology
Memorophilia (1995)	Architextures (1998)

Memorophilia is the debut studio album by American jazz pianist Vijay Iyer, which was recorded in 1995 and released on the Asian Improv label.

== Background ==
The album features a solo piano piece and three different ensembles: the Vijay Iyer Trio (M-Base saxophonist Steve Coleman joins the trio on two tracks), the electric funk quartet Poisonous Prophets, and the improvising quintet Spirit Complex, with AACM trombonist George Lewis and Asian Improv instigator Francis Wong.

== Reception ==
Professional ratings
Review scores
Source	Rating
AllMusic	4/5 stars
Tom Hull	B+

In his review for AllMusic, David R. Adler states "His cerebral compositional approach and advanced playing style unite all the disparate streams that the album has to offer."

== Track listing ==
All compositions by Vijay Iyer

1. "Relativist's Waltz" – 6:13
2. "Stars Over Mars" – 9:07
3. "Spellbound and Sacrosanct, Cowrie Shells and the Shimmering Sea" – 7:03
4. "March & Epilogue" – 8:15
5. "Peripatetics" – 7:51
6. "Algebra" – 7:51
7. "Off the Top" – 7:10
8. "Memorophilia" – 7:57
9. "Segment for Sentiment #2" – 6:09

== Personnel ==
- Vijay Iyer – piano
- Jeff Brock – bass on 1, 2, 3, 7 & 8
- Brad Hargreaves – drums on 1, 2, 3, 7 & 8
- Steve Coleman – alto sax on 1 & 7
- George Lewis – trombone on 4 & 9
- Francis Wong – tenor sax on 4 & 9
- Kash Killion – cello on 4 & 9
- Elliot Humberto Kavee – drums on 4, 5 & 9
- Liberty Ellman – guitar on 5
- Jeff Bilmes – electric bass on 5
