= Historicity (album) =

Studio album by Vijay Iyer Trio
- Released: October 13, 2009
- Recorded: November 3, 2008 & March 31, 2009 at Systems Two Sound, NYC
- Genre: Jazz
- Length: 61:50
- Label: ACT Music ACT 9489
- Producer: Vijay Iyer

Vijay Iyer chronology
Tragicomic (2008)	Historicity (2009)	Solo (2010)

Historicity is an album by pianist Vijay Iyer released on the ACT label in 2009.

== Reception ==
Professional ratings
Aggregate scores
Source	Rating
Metacritic	87/100
Review scores
Source	Rating
AllMusic	4.5/5 stars
All About Jazz	4.5/5 stars
The Guardian	4/5 stars
Los Angeles Times	3.5/4 stars
Pitchfork	7.8/10
PopMatters	9/10
Tom Hull	A−
Uncut	4/5 stars
Under the Radar	7/10

The album received universal acclaim with Metacritic giving it a score of 87 from 8 reviews. The AllMusic review by Michael G. Nastos awarded the album 4½ stars out of 5, stating, "Vijay Iyer has mad skills, overwhelmingly and powerfully demonstrated on all of his recordings, but especially this one. He's also maturing at a rapid rate, while at the height of his powers on this incredible effort that sounds like much more than a mere piano-bass-drums mainstream jazz trio. This is an incredible CD, and a strong candidate for best jazz CD of 2009". Writing for All About Jazz, Chris May said, "A galvanizing album. No further explanation necessary. Please". PopMatters writer Will Layman said, "Pianist Vijay Iyer is happy to stun you, to knock you into awe, to blow your mind. He brings technique, imagination, and wide perspective to his art. Historicity, the first recording wholly devoted to Iyer’s trio with bassist Stephen Crump and drummer Marcus Gilmore, is a jewel".

== Track listing ==
All compositions by Vijay Iyer except as indicated

1. "Historicity" - 7:50
2. "Somewhere" (Leonard Bernstein, Stephen Sondheim) - 6:57
3. "Galang (Trio Riot Version)" (Justine Frischmann, Maya Arulpragasam, Ross Orton, Steve Mackey) - 2:41
4. "Helix" - 4:00
5. "Smoke Stack" (Andrew Hill) - 8:09
6. "Big Brother" (Stevie Wonder) - 4:48
7. "Dogon A.D." (Julius Hemphill) - 9:20
8. "Mystic Brew (Trixation Version)" (Ronnie Foster) - 4:56
9. "Trident: 2010" - 9:10
10. "Segment for Sentiment #2" - 4:03

== Personnel ==
- Vijay Iyer — piano
- Stephan Crump — bass
- Marcus Gilmore — drums
