= Still Life with Commentator =

Studio album by Vijay Iyer & Mike Ladd
- Released: March 6, 2007
- Recorded: March 26–27, 2006; June 17, 2006
- Studios: Hotel Neutor, Salzburg; Listen, New York
- Genre: Jazz
- Length: 65:35
- Label: Savoy Jazz
- Producers: Vijay Iyer; Mike Ladd; Scotty Hard

Vijay Iyer chronology
Raw Materials (2006)	Still Life with Commentator (2007)	Tragicomic (2008)

Still Life with Commentator is a collaborative studio album by American jazz pianist Vijay Iyer and American hip-hop musician Mike Ladd. It was released on Savoy Jazz in 2007.

== Critical reception ==
Professional ratings
Review scores
Source	Rating
All About Jazz	5/5 stars
AllMusic	3.5/5 stars
Tom Hull	A–
The Penguin Guide to Jazz Recordings	3/4 stars

Lyn Horton of All About Jazz gave the album 5 out of 5 stars, commenting that "This work illuminates the perils within contemporary global society from the standpoint of the media and information blitz." Sean Westergaard of AllMusic gave the album 3.5 out of 5 stars, describing it as "a dense, thought-provoking piece that takes some effort to internalize." Mike Shanley of JazzTimes wrote, "This disc exists in a musical Bermuda Triangle that conjoins jazz, electronica and that mutant, undefined style of pop music created by the likes of Björk."

== Track listing ==
No.	Title	Length
1.	"Infogee Rhapsody"	4:17
2.	"Edward L. Bernays Flies the Hindenburg"	2:33
3.	"Been There Done That"	7:59
4.	"Cleaning Up the Mess"	5:13
5.	"Lake Aaron (Commentator Landscape #1: Aaron Brown)"	3:02
6.	"Jon Stewart on Crossfire"	3:22
7.	"Shep's Brook (Commentator Landscape #2: Shepard Smith)"	3:04
8.	"Riding on the Intro Graphics to Cable News"	4:09
9.	"Man Channel"	4:11
10.	"Fox 'n' Friends"	0:30
11.	"Holocaust Blog"	5:33
12.	"Cybernut Bucolia"	3:59
13.	"Mount Rather (Commentator Landscape #3: Dan Rather)"	4:28
14.	"Latex Thumbs Up"	3:24
15.	"Redemption Chant"	2:06
16.	"Blog Mom's Anthem"	2:52
17.	"The Last Atrocity"	4:51

== Personnel ==
Credits adapted from liner notes.

- Vijay Iyer – piano, synthesizer
- Mike Ladd – vocals, production, liner notes, photography
- Guillermo E. Brown – vocals, electronic percussion
- Pálína Jónsdóttir – vocals
- Masayasu Nakanishi – vocals
- Liberty Ellman – guitar
- Okkyung Lee – cello
- Pamela Z – vocals, electronic processing, translation
- Scotty Hard – production

== See also ==
- Jon Stewart's 2004 appearance on Crossfire
