= Ophiuchus Butterfly =

Studio album by Liberty Ellman
- Released: 2006
- Recorded: September 2005
- Studio: Brooklyn Recording, Brooklyn
- Genre: Jazz
- Length: 57:37
- Label: Pi Recordings
- Producer: Liberty Ellman

Liberty Ellman chronology
Tactiles (2003)	Ophiuchus Butterfly (2006)	Radiate (2015)

Ophiuchus Butterfly is an album by jazz guitarist Liberty Ellman, which was recorded in 2005 and released on Pi Recordings. He leads a sextet with Steve Lehman on alto sax, Mark Shim on tenor sax, Jose Davila on tuba, Stephan Crump on bass and Gerald Cleaver on drums.

== Reception ==
Professional ratings
Review scores
Source	Rating
AllMusic	3.5/5 stars
The Penguin Guide to Jazz Recordings	3.5/4 stars

In his review for AllMusic, Scott Yanow states "This music will take a bit of patience but it is worth the time for Ellman's music is quite original and subtle."

The All About Jazz review by Mark F. Turner notes "The creative and exhilarating Ophiuchus Butterfly finds Ellman digging deeper into eccentric and progressive territories with a sextet of like-minded artists with distinct voices."

In a review for PopMatters, Will Layman says "Ophiuchus Butterfly is reserved in its solo statements, but exuberant in its rhythms and construction."

The JazzTimes review by Aaron Steinberg states "Ellman still likes his funk and bop, but he’s now thinking in bigger structures, more complicated voicings and in textures."

== Track listing ==
All Compositions by Liberty Ellman

1. "Ophiuchus Butterfly" – 6:33
2. "Aestivation" – 6:56
3. "Snow Lips" – 4:09
4. "You Have Ears" – 6:35
5. "The Naturalists" – 1:51
6. "Pretty Words, Like Blades" – 4:34
7. "Tarmacadam" – 7:08
8. "Looking Up" – 7:58
9. "Chromos" – 8:48
10. "Borealis" – 3:05

== Personnel ==
- Liberty Ellman – guitar, synthesizer, sampler
- Steve Lehman – alto saxophone
- Mark Shim – tenor saxophone
- Jose Davila – tuba
- Stephan Crump – acoustic bass
- Gerald Cleaver – drums
