= Simulated Progress =

Studio album by Fieldwork
- Released: 2005
- Recorded: September 16, 2004
- Studio: Systems Two, Brooklyn
- Genre: Jazz
- Length: 48:55
- Label: Pi Recordings
- Producer: Fieldwork & Scott Harding

Vijay Iyer chronology
| Blood Sutra (2003) | Simulated Progress (2005) | Reimagining (2005) |

Simulated Progress is the second album by Fieldwork, a collective trio consisting of Vijay Iyer on piano, Elliot Humberto Kavee on drums, and Steve Lehman on alto and sopranino saxophone replacing former saxophonist Aaron Stewart, which was recorded in 2004 and released on Pi Recordings.

== Reception ==
Professional ratings
Review scores
| Source | Rating |
|---|---|
| AllMusic | 3/5 stars |
| Tom Hull | A– |
| The Penguin Guide to Jazz Recordings | 3.5/4 stars |

In his review for AllMusic, Scott Yanow states "No fireworks occur, the originals are forgettable, and the magic that is necessary to make this type of advanced jazz project a success is lacking."

The JazzTimes review by David R. Adler notes "Fieldwork’s rhythmic logic can be immensely involved, but the results are disarmingly concise. The music is also rich in paradox: dark yet uplifting, intellectually demanding yet effortlessly funky."

The All About Jazz review by Paul Olson states "The greatest compliment that can be paid to Simulated Progress is that there is nothing else out there that sounds like it. This is difficult music. In its risk-taking, fragility, and fearlessness, it's also very thrilling."

== Track listing ==
1. "Headlong" (Vijay Iyer) – 4:07
2. "Transgression" (Elliot Humberto Kavee) – 5:34
3. "Trips" (Steve Lehman) – 3:57
4. "Telematic" (Vijay Iyer) – 2:42
5. "Media Studies" (Steve Lehman) – 5:12
6. "Gaudi" (Elliot Humberto Kavee) – 4:02
7. "Transitions" (Vijay Iyer) – 5:49
8. "Peril" (Elliot Humberto Kavee) – 4:49
9. "Reprise" (Steve Lehman) – 3:38
10. "Infogee Dub" (Vijay Iyer) – 4:29
11. "Durations" (Steve Lehman) – 4:36

== Personnel ==
- Vijay Iyer – piano
- Steve Lehman – alto saxophone, sopranino saxophone
- Elliot Humberto Kavee – drums
