= Holding It Down: The Veterans' Dreams Project =

Studio album by Vijay Iyer & Mike Ladd
- Released: September 24, 2013
- Recorded: June 21–22, 2012
- Studios: The Bunker, Brooklyn, New York
- Genre: Jazz
- Length: 70:04
- Label: Pi Recordings
- Producer: Vijay Iyer

Vijay Iyer chronology
Accelerando (2012)	Holding It Down: The Veterans' Dreams Project (2013)	Mutations (2014)

Holding It Down: The Veterans' Dreams Project is a collaborative studio album by American jazz pianist Vijay Iyer and American hip-hop musician Mike Ladd. It was released on Pi Recordings in 2013.

== Critical reception ==
Professional ratings
Review scores
Source	Rating
All About Jazz	4/5 stars
Financial Times	4/5 stars
Tom Hull	B+
The Irish Times	4/5 stars
JazzTimes	favorable
Los Angeles Times	4/4 stars
MusicOMH	4.5/5 stars
PopMatters	8/10 stars

Daniel Paton of MusicOMH gave the album 4.5 out of 5 stars, calling it "compelling and beautiful; troubling and moving in equal measure." Mike Hobart of Financial Times gave the album 4 out of 5 stars, writing, "Each track is stalked by the fear, guilt and surrealism of the post-traumatic dreams that were culled from scores of interviews."

== Track listing ==
No.	Title	Writer(s)	Length
1.	"Here" (Mike, Cambridge)	Vijay Iyer; Mike Ladd	3:07
2.	"Derelict Poetry" (Maurice, Brooklyn)	Maurice Decaul; Iyer	4:15
3.	"Capacity" (Lynn, Bronx)	Lynn Hill; Iyer	3:56
4.	"Walking with the Duppy" (Rashan, Queens)	Iyer; Ladd	3:42
5.	"There Is a Man Slouching in the Stairway" (Maurice, Brooklyn)	Decaul; Iyer	3:59
6.	"My Fire" (Brad, Chester)	Iyer; Ladd	3:09
7.	"On Patrol" (Maurice, Brooklyn)	Decaul; Iyer	4:53
8.	"Dream of an Ex-Ranger" (William, Newton)	Iyer; Ladd	3:09
9.	"Name" (Lynn, Bronx)	Hill; Iyer	3:37
10.	"Costume" (Mike, Cambridge)	Iyer; Ladd	4:08
11.	"Tormented Star of Morning" (Maurice, Brooklyn)	Decaul; Iyer	5:09
12.	"Patton" (Calvin, Massapequa)	Iyer; Ladd	4:58
13.	"Shush" (Maurice, Brooklyn)	Decaul; Iyer	4:06
14.	"REM Killer" (Kirk, Lexington)	Iyer; Ladd	3:48
15.	"Requiem for an Insomniac" (Maurice, Brooklyn)	Decaul; Iyer	5:14
16.	"Dreams in Color" (Lynn, Bronx)	Hill; Iyer	2:39
17.	"Mess Hall" (Merrin, San Diego)	Ladd; Pamela Z	6:15
Total length:			70:04

== Personnel ==
Credits adapted from liner notes.

- Vijay Iyer – piano, electric piano, electronics, production, programming, liner notes
- Mike Ladd – vocals, analogue synthesizer, liner notes
- Maurice Decaul – vocals
- Lynn Hill – vocals
- Pamela Z – vocals
- Guillermo E. Brown – vocals, effects
- Liberty Ellman – guitar, mixing
- Okkyung Lee – cello
- Kassa Overall – drums
