= Marcus Gilmore =

American jazz drummer (born 1986)

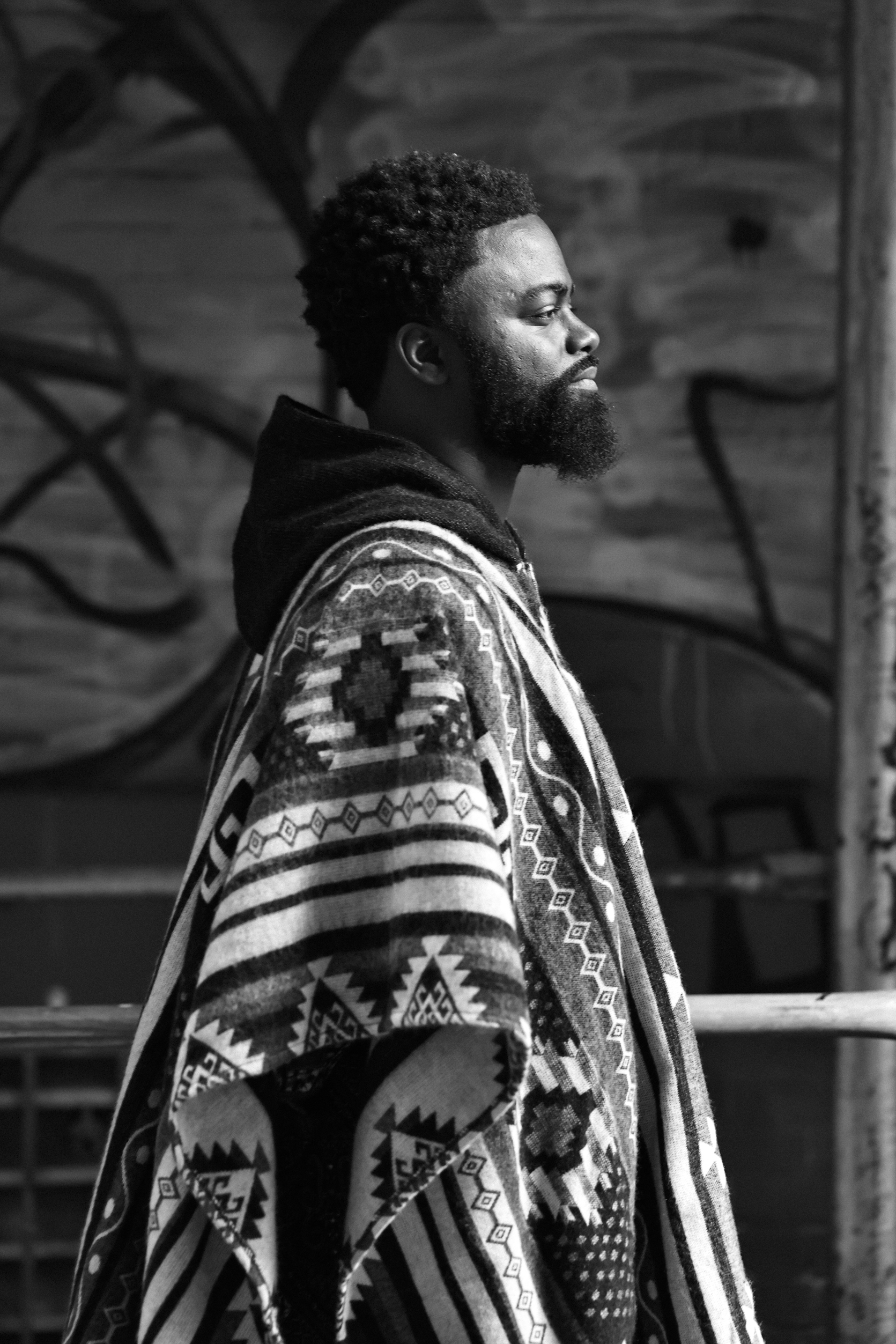
- Gilmore in 2023

Background information
- Born: Hollis, Queens, New York, U.S.
- Occupations: Musician, composer, producer, musical director
- Instruments: Drums

Marcus Gilmore (born October 10, 1986) is an American jazz drummer. In 2009, New York Times critic Ben Ratliff included Gilmore in his list of drummers who are "finding new ways to look at the drum set, and at jazz itself". Ratliff also said that Gilmore had "created that pleasant citywide buzz when someone new and special blows through New York clubs and jam sessions".

== Biography ==
A graduate of the Fiorello H. LaGuardia High School of Music & Art and Performing Arts, Gilmore also received full ride scholarships to the Juilliard School of Music and Manhattan School of Music. He has been touring professionally since the age of sixteen.

The New York based musician was a protégé of the 2018 Rolex Mentors And Protégé project.

He has performed or recorded with Mulatu Astatke, Chick Corea, Pharoah Sanders, Savion Glover, Pat Metheny, Ambrose Akinmusire, Ravi Coltrane, Common, Flying Lotus, Robert Glasper, Natalie Cole, Steve Coleman, Vijay Iyer, Derrick Hodge, Chief Xian aTunde Adjuah, Thundercat, Brad Mehldau, Cassandra Wilson, Gonzalo Rubalcaba, Nicholas Payton, Jill Scott, Talib Kweli, Queen Latifah, Norah Jones, Black Thought, Zakir Hussain, The Cadillacs, Bilal, Terrence Blanchard, Roy Hargrove, Terrace Martin, Taylor McFerrin, and Fred Armisen.

Gilmore was featured on the cover of Modern Drummer Magazine for their June 2019 issue.

Gilmore was chosen as a primary artist to contribute to the Original Motion Picture Soundtrack for the 2020 Disney-Pixar film Soul.

Gilmore was commissioned by the American Composers Orchestra to write his first Orchestral work, which debuted in 2020 with members of the Cape Town Philharmonic. In June 2023, he premiered his full composition with the American Composers Orchestra, in NYC.

== Awards and honors ==
Gilmore won a Grammy Award for Best Latin Jazz Album for Antidote, as part of Chick Corea's band.

Gilmore was introduced as one of the “25 for the Future” by DownBeat magazine in 2016.

Gilmore’s debut album as bandleader, Journey to the New: Live at the Village Vanguard received the number one position on The New York Times Best Jazz Albums of 2025 list.

At the 2026 Grammy Awards, he won a Grammy for his performance on Sullivan Fortner's album Southern Nights in the Best Jazz Instrumental Album category.

== Musical style ==
Like his grandfather Roy Haynes, Gilmore draws upon a wide variety of influences from Tony Williams to free jazz drummer Milford Graves. When talking about Graves in Modern Drummer, he said "A lot of Milford's playing deals with rhythm, but not in a very metric way—it's non-metric, a lot of waves. It's still melodic, even more so because it's very linguistic. Milford doesn't even really play snares. He keeps the snares off. His drumming sounds very melodic and very lyrical. It sounds like a language." He has specifically cited Elvin Jones on the album Speak No Evil and Tony Williams' Lifetime as influences.

== Discography ==
=== As leader/co-leader ===
- 2023 For Loved Ones (Dream Gold Soul)
- 2023 Refract (Red Hook)
- 2025 Journey to the New: Live at the Village Vanguard (Drummerslams)
- 2025 Trio of Bloom (Pyroclastic Records)
- 2026 Purpose (Sounds of Crenshaw)
- 2026 Shards (Red Hook)

=== As sideman ===
With Ambrose Akinmusire

- 2018 Origami Harvest (Blue Note)

With Steve Coleman

- 2006 Steve Coleman and Five Elements, Weaving Symbolics (Blue Label)
- 2011 The Mancy of Sound (Pi)
- 2015 Synovial Joints (Pi)

With Chick Corea

- 2012 The Continents: Concerto for Jazz Quintet & Chamber Orchestra
- 2013 The Vigil
- 2019 Antidote

With Sullivan Fortner

- Southern Nights (Artwork, 2025)

With Graham Haynes

- 2007 Full Circle (Kindred Rhythm)

With Gilad Hekselman

- 2008 Words Unspoken
- 2011 Hearts Wide Open (Jazz Village)
- 2013 This Just In (Jazz Village)
- 2015 Homes

With In Common: Walter Smith III & Matthew Stevens

- 2018 In Common (Featuring Joel Ross, Harish Raghavan and Marcus Gilmore) (Whirlwind Recordings)

With Vijay Iyer

- 2005 Reimagining (Savoy Jazz )
- 2008 Tragicomic (Sunnyside)
- 2009 Historicity (ACT)
- 2012 Accelerando (ACT)
- 2015 Break Stuff (ECM)

With Joe Martin

- 2009 Not by Chance (Anzic)

With Taylor McFerrin

- 2014 Early Riser (Brainfeeder)

With Nicholas Payton

- 2008 Into the Blue (Nonesuch)

With Chris Potter

- 2017 The Dreamer Is the Dream (ECM)

With Gonzalo Rubalcaba

- 2008 Avatar (Blue Note)
- 2011 XXI Century (SPassion)

With Mark Turner

- 2014 Lathe of Heaven (ECM)

With Lionel Loueke

- 2010 Mwaliko (Blue Note)

Main source:
