= Door (Fieldwork album) =

Studio album by Fieldwork
- Released: April 22, 2008
- Recorded: December 21, 2007
- Studio: Brooklyn Recording, Brooklyn
- Genre: Jazz
- Length: 51:52
- Label: Pi Recordings
- Producer: Fieldwork

Vijay Iyer chronology
Tragicomic (2008)	Door (2008)	Tirtha (2011)

Door is the third album by Fieldwork, a collective trio consisting of Vijay Iyer on piano, Steve Lehman on alto saxophone and Tyshawn Sorey on drums replacing former drummer Elliot Humberto Kavee, which was recorded in 2007 and released on Pi Recordings.

== Reception ==
Professional ratings
Review scores
Source	Rating
AllMusic	3/5 stars
Tom Hull	A−
PopMatters	7/10

In his review for AllMusic, Michael G. Nastos states, "A music not for everyone in the jazz world, but those who are bold and will listen closely hear a phenomenal concept brought fully to fruition by these incredible, challenging, forward-thinking musicians."

The JazzTimes review by Mike Shanley notes, "Tension and suspense are two key qualities on Door: a gargled alto sax squawk lurking in the distance, stop-start beats played on the rims of the snare and bassy piano lines played in the low register more than make up for the trio’s lack of the stringed instrument."

The All About Jazz review by Troy Collins states, "A truly singular post-modern hybrid that draws equally from M-Base rhythms, Braxtonian structural theory and stark minimalism, Door is the formidable trio's most expansive and challenging recording to date."

== Track listing ==
1. "Of" (Tyshawn Sorey) – 3:52
2. "After Meaning" (Steve Lehman) – 4:44
3. "Less" (Vijay Iyer) – 4:56
4. "Balanced" (Vijay Iyer) – 2:59
5. "Bend" (Tyshawn Sorey) – 8:11
6. "Cycle I" (Tyshawn Sorey) – 7:18
7. "Pivot Point" (Tyshawn Sorey) – 2:53
8. "Pivot Point Redux" (Tyshawn Sorey) – 3:08
9. "Ghost Time" (Vijay Iyer) – 6:20
10. "Cycle II" (Tyshawn Sorey) – 3:56
11. "Rai" (Steve Lehman) – 4:35

== Personnel ==
- Vijay Iyer – piano
- Steve Lehman – alto saxophone, sopranino saxophone
- Tyshawn Sorey – drums
