= In What Language? =

Studio album by Vijay Iyer & Mike Ladd
- Released: October 21, 2003
- Recorded: April 30, 2003; May 2–3, 2003
- Studio: Sorcerer Sound, New York; TME, New York
- Genre: Jazz; downtempo
- Length: 68:58
- Label: Pi
- Producer: Vijay Iyer; Mike Ladd; Scotty Hard

Vijay Iyer & Mike Ladd chronology
Your Life Flashes (2002)	In What Language? (2003)	Blood Sutra (2003)

In What Language? is a collaborative studio album by American jazz pianist Vijay Iyer and American hip-hop musician Mike Ladd. It was released on Pi Recordings in 2003.

== Critical reception ==
Professional ratings
Review scores
Source	Rating
AllMusic	4/5 stars
The Penguin Guide to Jazz Recordings	4/4 stars
Pitchfork	8.3/10
PopMatters	favorable

Joe Tangari of Pitchfork wrote, "What might make In What Language? truly important ... is that it's focused intently on probing social issues in meaningful ways." Chris Nickson of AllMusic commented, "Written originally to be performed on-stage in a theatrical setting, it transfers well to a purely recorded medium, dense and demanding, but ultimately satisfying, inasmuch as it leaves the listener full of questions and less certain about the world." Lyn Horton of All About Jazz stated, "These composers have instituted a new paradigm for 21st century opera." Anastasia Tsioulcas of Billboard wrote, "With Iyer working as composer and Ladd as librettist, the two weave together elements of jazz, hip-hop and spoken-word art into a new, subversive kind of song cycle."

== Track listing ==
No.	Title	Length
1.	"The Color of My Circumference I"	4:10
2.	"The Density of the 19th Century"	5:15
3.	"Terminal City"	1:55
4.	"Rentals"	2:44
5.	"Security"	3:39
6.	"DeGaulle"	6:37
7.	"TLC"	2:39
8.	"Three Lotto Stories"	4:49
9.	"The Color of My Circumference II"	2:09
10.	"Iraqi Businessman"	2:42
11.	"Taking Back The Airplane"	4:54
12.	"The Color of My Circumference III"	2:29
13.	"Innana After Baghdad"	2:32
14.	"In What Language"	4:05
15.	"Asylum"	6:21
16.	"The Color of My Circumference IV"	5:51
17.	"Plastic Bag"	6:07

== Personnel ==
Credits adapted from liner notes.

- Vijay Iyer – piano, keyboards, electronics, production, mixing, liner notes
- Mike Ladd – vocals (1–3, 9, 12, 16, 17), electronics, production, mixing, liner notes, photography
- Latasha N. Nevada Diggs – vocals (2, 5, 8, 13), electronics (13)
- Allison Easter – vocals (2, 6, 11, 13, 15)
- Ajay Naidu – vocals (4, 7, 10, 14)
- Rudresh Mahanthappa – alto saxophone
- Ambrose Akinmusire – trumpet
- Dana Leong – cello, flugelhorn, trombone
- Liberty Ellman – guitar
- Stephan Crump – double bass
- Trevor Holder – drums
- Scotty Hard – production
