= Radhe Radhe: Rites of Holi =

Studio album by Vijay Iyer
- Released: November 7, 2014
- Genre: Soundtrack
- Length: 32:59
- Label: ECM ECM 5507
- Producer: Manfred Eicher, Lauren Snelling, Vijay Iyer

Vijay Iyer chronology
Mutations (2013)	Radhe Radhe: Rites of Holi (2014)	Break Stuff (2014)

Professional ratings
Review scores
Source	Rating
Orlando Weekly	4/5 stars

Radhe Radhe: Rites of Holi is a studio album by American jazz musician Vijay Iyer. It was released on November 7, 2014 under ECM Records as a soundtrack for Prashant Bhargava's experimental documentary film Radhe Radhe. The album was commissioned by Emil Kang, Executive Director of the Carolina Performing Arts as part of a wider series of works to celebrate the centenary of Igor Stravinsky's The Rite of Spring (1913).

== Reception ==
Ian Patterson of All About Jazz stated "With a lesser orchestrator and technician than Iyer it would have been easy to succumb entirely to Bhargava's seductive visual poetry, with the music relegated to second plane. Iyer, however, is finely attuned to the dramaturgy unfolding and his highly empathetic score traces the arc between the myriad manifestations of the festival's early morning preparations and the unfolding maelstrom of mass euphoria that follows. To the initial frames of nature—so still they seem to be photographs—the dual pianos of Iyer and Cory Smythe impose contrasting tension—a harbinger of the drama to come."

Jason Ferguson of Orlando Weekly wrote "Much like Stravinsky’s Rite, Iyer and Bhargava’s Rites is a work that’s steeped in dissonance and dashed expectations. As the day unfolds and societal strictures are loosened, the music and filmwork intensifies, immersing the viewer in the dizzying, suppressive chaos of celebrations that gradually turn threatening, especially to the women taking part; meanwhile, the coupling of Radha and Krishna follows a similarly pulse-raising path, with Radha’s sly smile turning ominous and imposing."

== Track listing ==
All music is composed by Vijay Iyer Part I: Adoration.

No.	Title	Length
1.	"Dawn"	3:25
2.	"Promise"	3:13
3.	"Summoning"	1:43
4.	"Spring Fever"	1:51
5.	"Procession"	1:53
6.	"Colors"	3:41

Part II: Transcendence

No.	Title	Length
7.	"Thirst"	3:08
8.	"Intoxication"	3:09
9.	"Exaltation"	2:14
10.	"Spirits"	1:43
11.	"Rituals"	2:22
12.	"Purging Rites"	4:24
Total length:		32:59

== Personnel ==
- Adam Sliwinski – conductor
- Vijay Iyer – piano (left channel), electronics
- Cory Smythe – piano (right channel)
- Amir Elsaffar – trumpet
- Jennifer Curtis – violin
- Gareth Flowers – trumpet
- Rebekah Heller – bassoon
- Laura Cocks – flute
- Joshua Rubin – clarinet
- Kyle Armbrust – viola
- Kivie Cahn-Lipman – cello
- Eric Lamb – flute
- Tyshawn Sorey – percussion
- Ross Karre – percussion
