= Solo (Vijay Iyer album) =

Studio album by Vijay Iyer
- Released: August 23, 2010
- Recorded: May 16–17, 2010 at OTR Studios, Belmont, CA
- Genre: Jazz
- Length: 59:49
- Label: ACT Music ACT 9524
- Producer: Vijay Iyer

Vijay Iyer chronology
| Historicity (2009) | Solo (2010) | Tirtha (2011) |

Solo is a solo album by pianist Vijay Iyer recorded in 2010 and released on the ACT label.

== Reception ==
Professional ratings
Aggregate scores
| Source | Rating |
|---|---|
| Metacritic | 81/100 |
Review scores
| Source | Rating |
| AllMusic | 3.5/5 stars |
| All About Jazz | 3/5 stars |
| The Guardian | 4/5 stars |
| Jazzwise | 4/5 stars |
| Pitchfork | 7.7/10 |
| PopMatters | 9/10 |
| Tom Hull | B+ |
| Uncut | 3/5 stars |

The album received universal acclaim with Metacritic giving it a score of 81 from 11 reviews. Phil Freeman, in his review for AllMusic states, "He can clearly make a piano do just about anything he wants it to, and Solo is a project that puts the thought that went into its construction clearly visible, but it's never breathtaking in the way a truly great solo piano performance can be". The Guardian review by John Fordham awarded the album 4 stars noting "Pianist Vijay Iyer's wealth of traditional jazz experience might not always be apparent in the organised, intricate contemporary music he plays with his own groups". PopMatters' Will Layman said "Iyer defies comparison other than in convincing you that he belongs in august company. If this first solo recital was a historical test, then Vijay Iyer gets an A". Writing for All About Jazz, Lyn Horton was less enthusiastic stating "Music history is already integrated into Iyer's being. If he were only to step out of the academic environment in which he has spent and spends so much time, he might stop following a never-ending path of reinterpreting history in order to move his compositional strength forward. It is likely that Iyer will receive positive accolades for this premiere solo effort. But his awareness of what he can do best seems to have slipped away".

== Track listing ==
All compositions by Vijay Iyer except as indicated

1. "Human Nature" (Steve Porcaro, John Bettis) - 6:07
2. "Epistrophy" (Thelonious Monk, Kenny Clarke) - 4:56
3. "Darn That Dream" (Jimmy Van Heusen, Eddie DeLange) - 4:14
4. "Black and Tan Fantasy" (Duke Ellington, Bubber Miley) - 4:50
5. "Prelude: Heartpiece" - 2:06
6. "Autoscopy" - 6:38
7. "Patterns" - 8:29
8. "Desiring" - 4:50
9. "Games" (Steve Coleman) - 3:37
10. "Fleurette Africaine" (Ellington) - 7:56
11. "One for Blount" - 3:03

== Personnel ==
- Vijay Iyer – piano
