= Panoptic Modes =

Studio album by Vijay Iyer
- Released: 2001
- Recorded: June 9, 2000
- Studio: The Studio/Current Sounds, NYC
- Genre: Jazz
- Length: 65:58
- Label: Red Giant RG 011
- Producer: Cookie Marenco and Vijay Iyer

Vijay Iyer chronology
Architextures (1998)	Panoptic Modes (2001)	Your Life Flashes (2002)

Panoptic Modes is the third studio album led by American pianist Vijay Iyer originally released on the Red Giant label in 2001 and re-released on Pi Recordings in 2010.

== Reception ==
Professional ratings
Review scores
Source	Rating
Allmusic	4/5 stars
Tom Hull	B+
The Penguin Guide to Jazz Recordings	4/4 stars

The Allmusic review by David R. Adler stated, "His harmonic and formal concepts are as challenging as ever, yet his exceedingly difficult writing is rendered oddly accessible by the unperturbed facility of his band". Writing for All About Jazz, Jim Santella said, "Vijay Iyer's music contains the adventurousness and dramatic tension that you'd expect from avant-garde jazz; as well as a light, rhythmic swing, for those of us who live in the mainstream. His third album is accessible to one and all. They're his originals, and they're interpreted by a stellar quartet".

== Track listing ==
All compositions by Vijay Iyer

1. "Invocation" - 6:07
2. "Configurations" - 6:41
3. "One Thousand and One" - 8:30
4. "History Is Alive" - 4:41
5. "Father Spirit" - 6:19
6. "Atlantean Tropes" - 6:54
7. "Numbers (For Mumia)" - 1:43
8. "Trident: 2001" - 7:16
9. "Circular Argument" - 4:47
10. "Invariants" - 8:19
11. "Mountains" - 4:41

== Personnel ==
- Vijay Iyer — piano
- Rudresh Mahanthappa — alto saxophone
- Stephan Crump — bass
- Derrek Phillips — drums
