= Break Stuff (album) =

Studio album by Vijay Iyer Trio
- Released: February 10, 2015
- Recorded: June 2014
- Studio: Avatar (New York, New York)
- Genre: Jazz
- Length: 1:10:36
- Label: ECM; ECM 2420
- Producer: Manfred Eicher

Vijay Iyer Trio chronology
| Radhe Radhe: Rites of Holi (2014) | Break Stuff (2015) | A Cosmic Rhythm with Each Stroke (2016) |

Professional ratings
Aggregate scores
| Source | Rating |
|---|---|
| Metacritic | 84/100 |
Review scores
| Source | Rating |
| All Music | 4/5 stars |
| The Guardian | 4/5 stars |
| PopMatters | 8/10 |
| The Irish Times | 4/5 stars |
| All About Jazz | 4.5/5 stars |
| Tom Hull | B+ |

Break Stuff is an album by the Vijay Iyer Trio recorded in June 2014 and released on ECM February the following year. The trio features rhythm section Stephan Crump and Marcus Gilmore.

== Reception ==
Thom Jurek in his review for All Music says that "This trio aims at an interior center, finds it, and pushes out, projecting Iyer & Co.'s discoveries."

In The Guardian, John Fordham gave this album four stars out of five, saying, "Iyer, bassist Stephan Crump and drummer Marcus Gilmore sound joined at the hip even when sometimes seeming to be investigating completely different tunes, but almost everything here feels just as jazz-rooted as the three classic covers on the tracklist."

John Garelick of The Boston Globe stated:

Like the pianist and composer’s other trio records, it makes for a satisfying, portable Iyer, alternating math-y rhythmic concoctions like the post-minimalist “Hood” (for the Detroit techno producer DJ Robert Hood) and “Mystery Woman” (which draws from the compound rhythms of South Indian music) with varied jazz standards (Thelonious Monk's “Work,” John Coltrane's “Countdown,” Billy Strayhorn's “Blood Count”) and more atmospheric originals. Iyer, bassist Stephan Crump, and drummer Marcus Gilmore have fully incorporated electronica and hip-hop into a jazz vocabulary. Despite the album's layered meters, you couldn't ask for a more swinging “Work,” or a more moving solo-piano treatment of “Blood Count,” ending with a repetition of the questing opening phrase over somber low-register chords. With all of this band's attention to rhythm, it's nice to have an isolated example of Iyer's sensitive voice leading, his beautiful touch and tone.

== Track listing ==
All music is composed by Vijay Iyer, except where indicated.

| No. | Title | Writer(s) | Length |
|---|---|---|---|
| 1. | "Starlings" | | 3:52 |
| 2. | "Chorale" | | 4:35 |
| 3. | "Diptych" | | 6:47 |
| 4. | "Hood" | | 6:10 |
| 5. | "Work" | Thelonious Monk | 6:14 |
| 6. | "Taking Flight" | | 7:15 |
| 7. | "Blood Count" | Billy Strayhorn | 4:34 |
| 8. | "Break Stuff" | | 5:26 |
| 9. | "Mystery Woman" | | 6:21 |
| 10. | "Geese" | | 6:38 |
| 11. | "Countdown" | John Coltrane | 5:57 |
| 12. | "Wrens" | | 6:47 |
| Total length: | | | 1:10:36 |

== Personnel ==
- Vijay Iyer – piano
- Stephan Crump – bass
- Marcus Gilmore – drums

== Charts ==
2015 chart performance for Break Stuff
| Chart (2015) | Peak position |
|---|---|
| Belgian Albums (Ultratop Flanders) | 186 |
| US Top Jazz Albums (Billboard) | 8 |

2025 chart performance for Break Stuff
| Chart (2025) | Peak position |
|---|---|
| Swedish Jazz Albums (Sverigetopplistan) | 17 |
