= Far from Over (Vijay Iyer album) =

Studio album by Vijay Iyer
- Released: August 25, 2017
- Recorded: April 2017
- Studio: Avatar (New York, New York)
- Genre: Jazz
- Length: 57:49
- Label: ECM; ECM 2581
- Producer: Manfred Eicher

Vijay Iyer chronology
A Cosmic Rhythm with Each Stroke (2016)	Far from Over (2017)	The Transitory Poems (2019)

Far from Over is a studio album by the Vijay Iyer Sextet recorded in April 2017 and released on ECM August that same year. The sextet features brass section Graham Haynes, Steve Lehman and Mark Shim and rhythm section Stephan Crump and Tyshawn Sorey.

== Reception ==
Professional ratings
Aggregate scores
Source	Rating
Metacritic	88/100
Review scores
Source	Rating
AllMusic	4.5/5 stars
The Guardian	5/5 stars
The Irish Times	4/5 stars
RTÉ	4/5 stars
PopMatters	8/10
Pitchfork	7.7/10
All About Jazz	4.5/5 stars
The Times	4/5 stars
Blurt	4/5 stars
Rolling Stone	4/5 stars

Far from Over was generally well-regarded by professional music critics on release. At Metacritic, which assigns a normalized rating out of 100 to reviews from mainstream critics, the album received an average score of 88, based on five reviews, indicating "universal acclaim".

In his review for AllMusic, Matt Collar wrote, "What's particularly engaging about Far from Over is Iyer and his band's sense of danger and risk-taking. Ultimately, it's that balance of harmonically adventurous exploration and no-holds-barred blowing that make Far from Over nothing short of thrilling."

== Track listing ==
All music is composed by Vijay Iyer.

No.	Title	Length
1.	"Poles"	7:49
2.	"Far from Over"	6:15
3.	"Nope"	5:41
4.	"End of the Tunnel"	2:17
5.	"Down to the Wire"	7:43
6.	"For Amiri Baraka"	3:22
7.	"Into Action"	5:00
8.	"Wake"	4:46
9.	"Good on the Ground"	6:32
10.	"Threnody"	8:24
Total length:		57:49

== Personnel ==
=== Vijay Iyer Sextet ===
- Vijay Iyer – piano
- Graham Haynes – cornet, flugelhorn, electronics
- Steve Lehman – alto saxophone
- Mark Shim – tenor saxophone
- Stephan Crump – double bass
- Tyshawn Sorey – drums

=== Production ===
- Manfred Eicher – producer, mixing
- James Farber – engineer, mixing
- Nate Odden – assistant engineer

== Charts ==
Chart	Peak position
US Top Jazz Albums (Billboard)	1
Belgian Albums (Ultratop Flanders)	160
