= City Parks Foundation =

American nonprofit organization

- Formation: 1989
- Headquarters: New York City
- Executive director: Heather Lubov
- Website: https://cityparksfoundation.org/

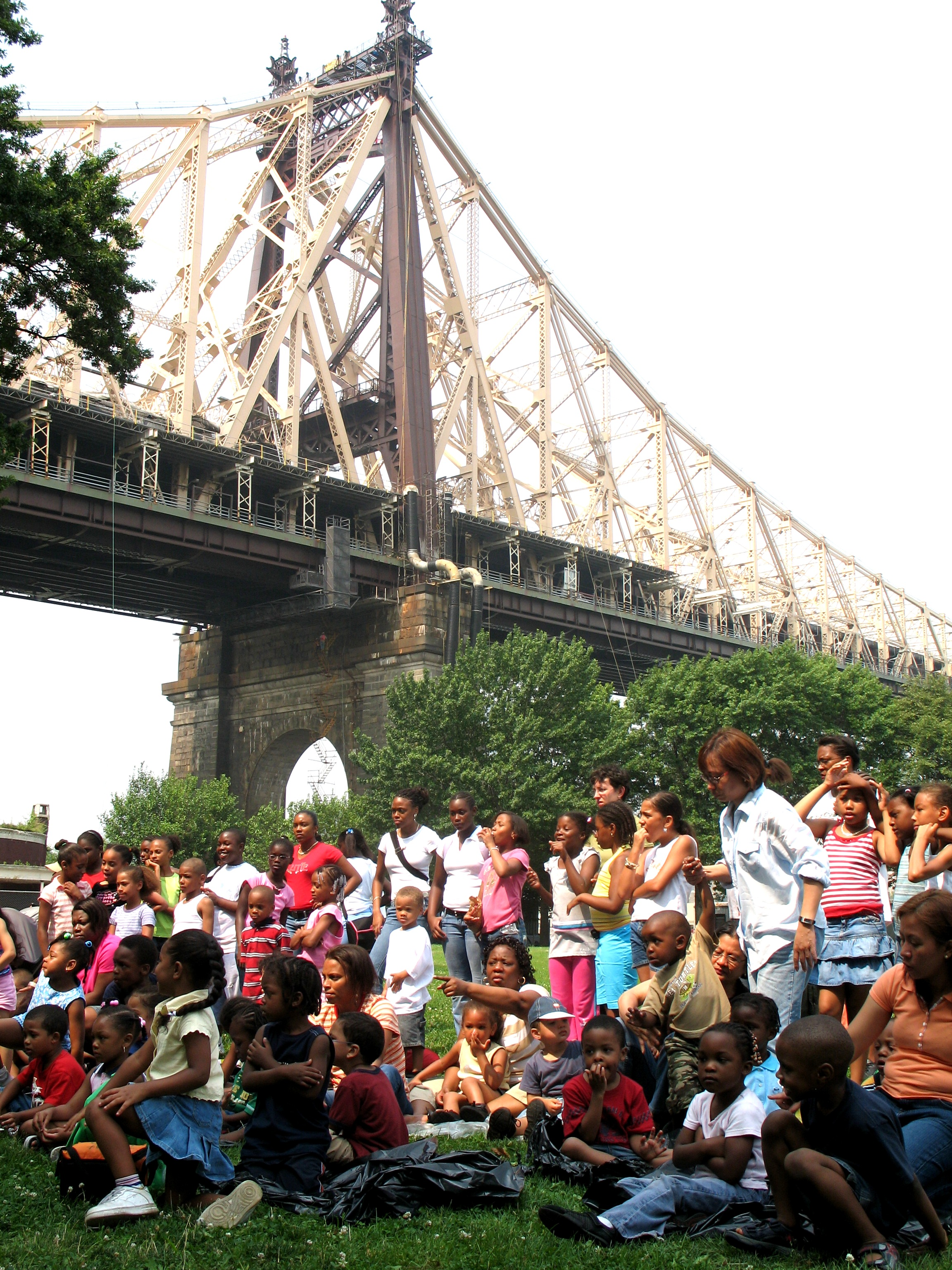
Queensbridge Park gathering

The City Parks Foundation is an independent nonprofit organization that provides free arts, sports, education, and community-building programs in parks across New York City. Founded in 1989, the Foundation operates in more than 400 parks, recreation centers, and public schools, serving approximately 285,000 New Yorkers each year. Its major initiatives include SummerStage, a citywide performing arts festival, and CityParks Tennis, one of the largest municipal youth tennis programs in the country. Additional offerings include golf, track and field, senior fitness, and outdoor education programs such as Coastal Classroom, Green Girls, Learning Gardens, and Seeds to Trees.

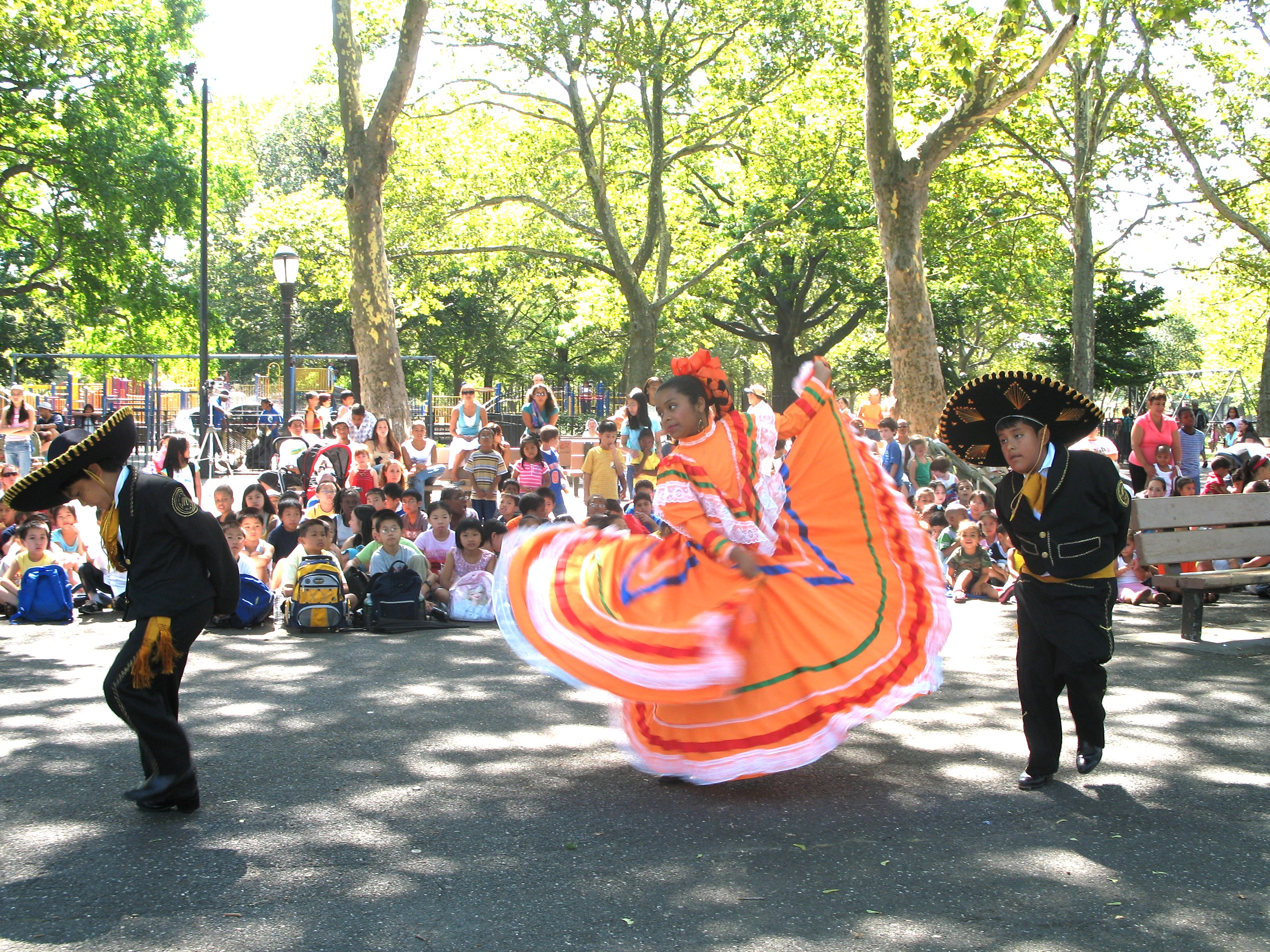
CityParks Kids Mexican dancers

The City Parks Foundation partners with the New York City Department of Parks & Recreation through initiatives such as Partnerships for Parks, a joint program that works to start, strengthen, and support neighborhood park groups. The initiative provides workshops, small grants, organization development, and problem solving to aid local efforts to revitalize parks and the communities that surround them. According to NYC Parks, the Foundation offers free, park-based programs in arts, sports, and education, reaching over 600,000 children and adults throughout New York City each year.

== Historical events ==
In 2006, the City Parks Foundation introduced a free outdoor dance series in city parks, featuring performances by twelve companies in Manhattan, Brooklyn, and Queens. Each event included a 45-minute participatory dance class open to all ages and skill levels, held prior to the performances. The initiative aimed to engage communities by immersing audiences in the language of dance and reflected the foundation's broader mission of “animating the parks” through accessible, hands-on cultural programming.

In 2015, the 22nd edition of the Charlie Parker Jazz Festival featured free outdoor concerts in Harlem and the East Village and included performances by Joe Lovano and Esperanza Spalding. The festival also hosted a public conversation between Rudresh Mahanthappa and Oliver Lake and received support from the Dalio Foundation.

In 2018, the City Parks Foundation's SummerStage festival featured free performances by Big Daddy Kane, Talib Kweli, Pete Rock, and The Lox as part of a lineup celebrating hip-hop’s legacy, with over 100 free shows across the five boroughs in genres including pop, opera, jazz, and dance.

In September 2019, the foundation celebrated its 30th anniversary with a gala in Central Park in September 2019. In the same year, it completed a $5.5 million renovation of the SummerStage venue in Central Park, adding a new stage, canopy, LED screens, upgraded sound and lighting systems, improved seating, and expanded dressing rooms for performers.

In 2020, amid the COVID-19 pandemic, the City Parks Foundation held its annual SummerStage Jubilee as a virtual benefit concert, according to ABC News. The event featured performances by Sting, Norah Jones, Trey Anastasio, Rufus Wainwright, Leslie Odom Jr., and Rosanne Cash, and was streamed across multiple platforms to raise support for the foundation's park-based programs. The concert also highlighted advocacy from public figures such as Billie Jean King, Ryan Seacrest, and Paul Shaffer.

During the 2023 season, SummerStage presented nearly 80 performances in 13 city parks, including sets by Tanya Tucker, Grandmaster Flash, and Monie Love.
