= Amir ElSaffar =

American jazz musician

- Born: 1977 (age 47–48); Chicago, Illinois, U.S.
- Genres: Jazz
- Occupation(s): Trumpeter, singer, musician
- Instrument(s): Trumpet, vocals

Amir ElSaffar (born 1977 in Chicago, Illinois) is an American jazz trumpeter and vocalist. His compositions combine jazz, classical, and traditional Arabic music.

== Life and career ==
ElSaffar was born in Chicago, Illinois, in 1977. His mother, Ruth El Saffar, an American, was a Cervantes scholar and Jungian analyst. His father, Zuhair El Saffar, is an Iraqi immigrant and physicist. He studied classical music at Depaul University in Chicago. In 2001, he won the Carmine Caruso Jazz Trumpet Competition and the International Trumpet Guild Jazz Improvisation Competition. He studied Iraqi maqam music in Baghdad and learned to play an Iraqi instrument, the santur. He began to weave traditional Arabic music into modern jazz trumpet. In 2007, he released his debut album, Two Rivers, for Pi Recordings. For the 2020-2021 school year, he is a Hodder Fellow at Princeton University.

ElSaffar has created new techniques to play microtones and ornaments that are idiomatic to Arab music but are not typically heard on the trumpet. As a composer, ElSaffar has used the microtones found in maqam music to create a unique approach to harmony and melody.

In 2002 he began studying the maqam tradition of music composition in Baghdad and London, with Hamid al-Saadi, one of the most renowned maqam singers in Iraq and is currently an acknowledged performer of the classical Iraqi maqam tradition. He performs actively as a vocalist and santur player with his group, Safaafir, the only ensemble in the US performing Iraqi Maqam in its traditional format.

In 2006, ElSaffar received commissions from the Painted Bride Art Center in Philadelphia and from the Festival of New Trumpet Music (FONT), to compose Two Rivers, a suite that invokes Iraqi musical traditions and frames them in a modern jazz setting. ElSaffar has since received commissions from the Jerome Foundation, the Jazz Institute of Chicago, and Chamber Music America and has continued developing a singular approach to integrating Middle Eastern tonalities and rhythms into an American jazz context, releasing three albums; Two Rivers (2006), Radif Suite (2010), and Inana (2011) to critical acclaim. He has also composed for theater projects and film soundtracks, and appeared in Jonathan Demme’s Oscar-nominated film, Rachel Getting Married.

As a sideman, ElSaffar has performed with Cecil Taylor, Simon Shaheen, Randy Brecker, Miya Masaoka, Rudresh Mahanthappa, Vijay Iyer, and Samir Chatterjee.

In addition to his busy performance schedule, ElSaffar curates a weekly concert series at Alwan for the Arts, New York's premiere center for Middle Eastern arts and culture.

== Discography ==
As leader

- Maqams of Baghdad (2006), Safaafir
- Two Rivers (Pi, 2007), Two Rivers Ensemble
- Radif Suite (2009), Hafez Modirzadeh/Amir ElSaffar Quartet
- Inana (2011), Two Rivers Ensemble
- Alchemy (2013), Amir ElSaffar Quintet
- Crisis (2015), Two Rivers Ensemble
- Rivers Of Sound (2017) [Not Two]
- The Other Shore (2021) (& Rivers of Sound) - As sideman
- Tribute to Ellington (1999), by Daniel Barenboim
- Goodnight Oslo (2009), by Robyn Hitchcock
