= Reimagining (album) =

Studio album by Vijay Iyer
- Released: May 17, 2005
- Recorded: November 22–23, 2004
- Studio: Systems Two, Brooklyn
- Genre: Jazz
- Length: 55:39
- Label: Savoy
- Producer: Vijay Iyer

Vijay Iyer chronology
Simulated Progress (2005)	Reimagining (2005)	Raw Materials (2006)

Reimagining is an album by American jazz pianist Vijay Iyer, which was recorded in 2004, originally released on the Savoy label and reissued in Europe by Pi Recordings. The follow-up to Blood Sutra, the record features nine Iyer's compositions for his quartet with Rudresh Mahanthappa on alto sax, Stephan Crump on bass and Marcus Gilmore on drums, and a solo piano interpretation of John Lennon's "Imagine".

== Reception ==
Professional ratings
Review scores
Source	Rating
AllMusic	4/5 stars
Tom Hull	A–
The Penguin Guide to Jazz Recordings	3/4 stars

In his review for AllMusic, Thom Jurek states, "Reimagining is the sound of the mature Iyer, who is at once authoritative and inquisitive, finding and relating mystery as he uncovers it and, in the process, furthering the jazz tradition. Bravo."

The JazzTimes review by Thomas Conrad says, "The most interesting question about Iyer is how, having fully elaborated a unique and specific musical space, he goes forward from here."

The All About Jazz review by Paul Olson notes, "Reimagining might not reach the searing highs of Blood Sutra, but it substitutes an organic, austere consistency of vision and accomplishment that's simply stunning."

== Track listing ==
All compositions by Vijay Iyer except where noted.

1. "Revolutions" – 6:32
2. "Inertia" – 3:19
3. "Song for Midwood" – 7:27
4. "Infogee's Cakewalk" – 5:36
5. "The Big Almost" – 6:42
6. "Cardio" – 5:36
7. "Experience" – 3:44
8. "Composites" – 5:30
9. "Phalanx" – 7:29
10. "Imagine" (John Lennon) – 3:44

== Personnel ==
- Vijay Iyer – piano
- Rudresh Mahanthappa – alto saxophone
- Stefan Crump – bass
- Marcus Gilmore – drums
