= Your Life Flashes =

Studio album by Fieldwork
- Released: 2002
- Recorded: March 27, 2002
- Studio: Sorcerer Sound, New York City
- Genre: Jazz
- Length: 50:01
- Label: Pi Recordings
- Producer: Fieldwork

Vijay Iyer chronology
Panoptic Modes (2001)	Your Life Flashes (2002)	In What Language? (2003)

Your Life Flashes is the debut album by Fieldwork, a collective trio consisting of Aaron Stewart on tenor saxophone, Vijay Iyer on piano, and Elliot Humberto Kavee on drums, which was recorded in 2002 and released on Pi Recordings.

== Reception ==
Professional ratings
Review scores
Source	Rating
AllMusic	4/5 stars
Tom Hull	A–
The Penguin Guide to Jazz Recordings	3.5/4 stars

In his review for AllMusic, David R. Adler states, "Like much of what Iyer creates under his own name, this music has the distinction of being toe-tappingly accessible and yet, on a technical level, nearly incomprehensible. It is a highly specialized language, to be sure, but also an endlessly refreshing one."

The JazzTimes review by Aaron Steinberg suggests, "Fieldwork's musicians have absorbed the highly rhythmic, dryly funky style that came out of the M-Base school and have adapted it to a cutting modern acoustic jazz setting. What sets Fieldwork apart, however, is the trio’s fervent and unwavering embrace of rhythm and attack."

The All About Jazz review by Dan McLenaghan states, "Your Life Flashes sounds foreign and familiar and avant-garde and mainstream all at the same time."

== Track listing ==
All compositions by Vijay Iyer except where noted.

1. "In Medias Res" – 6:03
2. "Accumulated Gestures" – 5:43
3. "Sublimination" (Aaron Stewart) – 4:37
4. "Generations" – 5:49
5. "Mosaic" (Aaron Stewart) – 4:51
6. "Sympathy" – 4:21
7. "Step Lively" – 2:53
8. "Horoscape" – 4:51
9. "The Inner World" – 5:29
10. "Path of Action (for Horace Tapscott)" – 5:24

== Personnel ==
- Vijay Iyer – piano
- Aaron Stewart – tenor saxophone
- Elliot Humberto Kavee – drums
