= A Cosmic Rhythm with Each Stroke =

Studio album by Vijay Iyer and Wadada Leo Smith
- Released: March 11, 2016
- Recorded: October 17–19, 2015
- Studios: Avatar, New York City
- Genre: Jazz
- Length: 1:06:13
- Label: ECM ECM 2486
- Producer: Manfred Eicher

Vijay Iyer chronology
Break Stuff (2014)	A Cosmic Rhythm with Each Stroke (2016)	Far from Over (2017)

Wadada Leo Smith chronology
Celestial Weather (2015)	A Cosmic Rhythm with Each Stroke (2015)	America's National Parks (2016)

Professional ratings
Aggregate scores
Source	Rating
Metacritic	82/100
Review scores
Source	Rating
All Music	4/5 stars
The Guardian	4/5 stars
Pitchfork	8.5/10
All About Jazz	5/5 stars
The Guardian	4/5 stars
RTÉ.ie	4/5 stars
Blurt Magazine	3/5 stars
Record Collector	3/5 stars
Financial Times	4/5 stars
Tom Hull	B+

A Cosmic Rhythm with Each Stroke is an album by trumpeter Wadada Leo Smith and pianist Vijay Iyer which was released in March 2016 on ECM Records.

== Reception ==
At Metacritic, that assigns a normalized rating out of 100 to reviews from mainstream critics, the album received an average score of 82, based on seven reviews, which indicates "universal acclaim".

Thom Jurek in his review for Allmusic says that:

The instincts these players offer in these works display the duo's mutual desire for intimate communication and spiritual trust through the medium of sound. Their uncompromising movement toward them results in a shared musical mind that speaks in a distinctive, unique emotional language.

— "A Cosmic Rhythm with Each Stroke (All Music Review)". All Music.

They also selected it as one of their Favorite Jazz Albums of 2016.

In The Guardian, John Fordham gave this album four stars and says that:

Smith’s tone and phrasing often reflect mid-period Miles Davis, but he blends free jazz into those resources with a unique poetic focus. Long high squeals and tumbling unfold over Iyer’s humming electronics, a bright brass fanfare soars over a chordal rumble, and a lamenting muted-trumpet descent invokes Sketches of Spain. Iyer mostly functions as a discreet foil, but this intimate conversation swells from interesting to enthralling as it unfolds.

— "A Cosmic Rhythm with Each Stroke (The Guardian Review)". The Guardian.

== Track listing ==
ECM Records – ECM 2420.

All music is composed by Vijay Iyer and Wadada Leo Smith, except where noted.

No.	Title	Writer(s)	Length
1.	"Passage"	Vijay Iyer	6:15
2.	"All Becomes Alive"		9:09
3.	"The Empty Mind Receives"		4:55
4.	"Labyrinths"		6:43
5.	"A Divine Courage"		9:12
6.	"Uncut Emeralds"		7:43
7.	"A Cold Fire"		5:55
8.	"Notes on Water"		7:58
9.	"Marian Anderson"	Wadada Leo Smith	8:23
Total length:			1:06:13

== Personnel ==
- Vijay Iyer – piano, fender rhodes, electronics
- Wadada Leo Smith – trumpet
