= Tragicomic (album) =

Studio album by Vijay Iyer
- Released: April 22, 2008
- Recorded: September 30 & October 1, 2007
- Studio: Bedford Studios, Brooklyn
- Genre: Jazz
- Length: 60:33
- Label: Sunnyside
- Producer: Vijay Iyer

Vijay Iyer chronology
Still Life with Commentator (2007)	Tragicomic (2008)	Door (2008)

Tragicomic is an album by American jazz pianist Vijay Iyer, which was recorded in 2007 and released on the Sunnyside label. The follow-up to Reimagining, the record features ten Iyer's compositions for his quartet with Rudresh Mahanthappa on alto sax, Stephan Crump on bass and Marcus Gilmore on drums, and two covers: a dub version of Bud Powell's "Comin' Up" and a solo piano interpretation of the standard "I'm All Smiles".

== Reception ==
Professional ratings
Review scores
Source	Rating
AllMusic	4/5 stars
Tom Hull	A

In his review for AllMusic, Ken Dryden states "Vijay Iyer and alto saxophonist Rudresh Mahanthappa blend their Indian heritage with the influence of their New York jazz experience in this striking session."

The JazzTimes review by Steve Greenlee says "The music is a marriage of intellect and power, of brains and brawn. Iyer has absorbed Andrew Hill, McCoy Tyner, Matthew Shipp and others, and that fact comes through whether he plays a burner or a ballad."

The All About Jazz review by Troy Collins states "A stunning achievement, Tragicomic is one of the year's best albums."

== Track listing ==
All compositions by Vijay Iyer except where noted.

1. "The Weight of Things" – 2:17
2. "Macaca Please" – 4:54
3. "Aftermath" – 6:20
4. "Comin' Up" (Bud Powell) – 4:26
5. "Without Lions" – 2:54
6. "Mehndi" – 6:50
7. "Age of Everything" – 5:23
8. "Window Text" – 5:41
9. "I'm All Smiles" (Michael Leonard) – 4:44
10. "Machine Days" – 7:26
11. "Threnody" – 6:02
12. "Becoming" – 3:36

== Personnel ==
- Vijay Iyer – piano
- Rudresh Mahanthappa – alto saxophone
- Stefan Crump – bass
- Marcus Gilmore – drums
