= Pi Recordings =

- Founded: 2001
- Founder: Seth Rosner
- Genre: Jazz, avant-garde jazz
- Country of origin: U.S.
- Location: New York City
- Official website: www.pirecordings.com

Pi Recordings is a jazz record label founded by Seth Rosner in 2001. He was soon joined as partner by Yulun Wang. Pi specializes in avant-garde jazz. Its first two albums were by Henry Threadgill.

Pi's roster includes Amir ElSaffar, Anthony Braxton, Corey Wilkes, James Blood Ulmer, Leroy Jenkins, Liberty Ellman, Marc Ribot, Muhal Richard Abrams, Roscoe Mitchell, Rudresh Mahanthappa, Steve Lehman, Art Ensemble of Chicago, Steve Coleman, Vijay Iyer, and Wadada Leo Smith.

In its first twenty years, Pi released fewer than a hundred recordings. In 2021, DownBeat wrote that "Pi releases rigorous, pathbreaking music that stretches the boundaries of jazz while honoring its history."

== Discography ==
=== Main series ===
1. Everybodys Mouth's a Book (2001) – Henry Threadgill
2. Up Popped the Two Lips (2001) – Henry Threadgill
3. Song for My Sister (2002) – Roscoe Mitchell & The Note Factory
4. The Year of the Elephant (2002) – Wadada Leo Smith's Golden Quartet
5. Your Life Flashes (2002) – Fieldwork (Vijay Iyer, Elliot Humberto Kavee, Aaron Stewart)
6. Organic Resonance (2003) – Wadada Leo Smith & Anthony Braxton
7. The Meeting (2003) – Art Ensemble of Chicago
8. Tactiles (2003) – Liberty Ellman
9. In What Language? (2003) – Vijay Iyer & Mike Ladd
10. Saturn, Conjunct the Grand Canyon in a Sweet Embrace (2004) – Wadada Leo Smith & Anthony Braxton
11. Sirius Calling (2004) – Art Ensemble of Chicago
12. Juncture (2004) – Various Artists
13. And Now... (2004) – Revolutionary Ensemble
14. Mother Tongue (2004) – Rudresh Mahanthappa
15. Spiritual Unity (2005) – Marc Ribot
16. Simulated Progress (2005) – Fieldwork (Vijay Iyer, Steve Lehman, Elliot Humberto Kavee)
17. Demian as Posthuman (2005) – Steve Lehman
18. Back in Time (2005) – James Blood Ulmer
19. Ophiuchus Butterfly (2006) – Liberty Ellman
20. Non-Cognitive Aspects of the City (2006) – Art Ensemble of Chicago
21. Codebook (2006) – Rudresh Mahanthappa
22. Streaming (2006) – Muhal Richard Abrams, George E. Lewis & Roscoe Mitchell
23. Vision Towards Essence (2007) – Muhal Richard Abrams
24. Two Rivers (2007) – Amir ElSaffar
25. On Meaning (2007) – Steve Lehman
26. Door (2008) – Fieldwork (Vijay Iyer, Steve Lehman, Tyshawn Sorey)
27. Party Intellectuals (2008) – Marc Ribot's Ceramic Dog
28. Kinsmen (2008) – Rudresh Mahanthappa
29. Cries from tha Ghetto (2009) – Corey Wilkes
30. Travail Transformation and Flow (2009) – Steve Lehman
31. This Brings Us to Volume 1 (2009) – Henry Threadgill Zooid
32. Radif Suite (2010) – Amir ElSaffar & Hafez Modirzadeh
33. Harvesting Semblances and Affinities (2010) – Steve Coleman and Five Elements
34. Silent Movies (2010) – Marc Ribot
35. Apex (2010) – Rudresh Mahanthappa & Bunky Green
36. This Brings Us to Volume 2 (2010) – Henry Threadgill Zooid
37. SoundDance (2011) – Muhal Richard Abrams with Fred Anderson and George E. Lewis
38. The Mancy of Sound (2011) – Steve Coleman and Five Elements
39. Synastry (2011) – Jen Shyu & Mark Dresser
40. Oblique–1 (2011) – Tyshawn Sorey
41. Inana (2011) – Amir ElSaffar
42. Dialect Fluorescent (2012) – Steve Lehman Trio
43. Tomorrow Sunny / The Revelry, Spp (2012) – Henry Threadgill Zooid
44. Post–Chromodal Out! (2012) – Hafez Modirzadeh
45. Reunion: Live in New York (2012) – Sam Rivers Trio
46. Continuum (2012) – David Virelles
47. Functional Arrhythmias (2013) – Steve Coleman and Five Elements
48. Moment and the Message (2013) – Jonathan Finlayson & Sicilian Defence
49. Holding It Down: The Veterans' Dreams Project (2013) – Vijay Iyer & Mike Ladd
50. Fiction (2013) – Matt Mitchell
51. Alchemy (2013) – Amir ElSaffar
52. Fourteen (2014) – Dan Weiss
53. Live at the Village Vanguard (2014) – Marc Ribot Trio
54. Mise en Abîme (2014) –Steve Lehman Octet
55. In Convergence Liberation (2014) – Hafez Modirzadeh, ETHEL
56. Alloy (2014) – Tyshawn Sorey
57. Synovial Joints (2015) – Steve Coleman and the Council of Balance
58. In for a Penny, In for a Pound (2015) – Henry Threadgill's Zooid
59. Crisis (2015) – Amir ElSaffar Two Rivers Ensemble
60. Radiate (2015) – Liberty Ellman
61. Sounds and Cries of the World (2015) – Jen Shyu & Jade Tongue
62. Vista Accumulation (2015) – Matt Mitchell
63. Sixteen: Drummers Suite (2016) – Dan Weiss
64. Old Locks and Irregular Verbs (2016) – Henry Threadgill
65. The Inner Spectrum of Variables (2016) – Tyshawn Sorey
66. Sélébéyone (2016) – Steve Lehman
67. Moving Still (2016) – Jonathan Finlayson
68. Trickster (2017) – Miles Okazaki
69. Morphogenesis (2017) – Steve Coleman's Natal Eclipse
70. Verisimilitude (2017) – Tyshawn Sorey
71. A Pouting Grimace (2017) – Matt Mitchell
72. Song of Silver Geese (2017) – Jen Shyu
73. Dirt… And More Dirt (2018) – Henry Threadgill 14 or 15 Kestra: Agg
74. Starebaby (2018) – Dan Weiss
75. Double Up, Plays Double Up Plus (2018) – Henry Threadgill
76. Live at the Village Vanguard, Vol. 1 (The Embedded Sets) (2018) – Steve Coleman and Five Elements
77. 3 Times Round (2018) – Jonathan Finlayson
78. Igbó Alákọrin (The Singer’s Grove) Vol. I & II (2018) – David Virelles
79. Clockwise (2019) – Anna Webber
80. We Are On The Edge: A 50th Anniversary Celebration (2019) – Art Ensemble of Chicago
81. Phalanx Ambassadors (2019) – Matt Mitchell
82. The People I Love (2019) – Steve Lehman
83. The Adornment of Time (2019) – Tyshawn Sorey & Marilyn Crispell
84. The Sky Below (2019) – Miles Okazaki
85. Last Desert (2020) – Liberty Ellman
86. Natural Selection (2020) – Dan Weiss

=== Reissues ===
- 901 Blood Sutra (2006) – Vijay Iyer – originally released on Artists House in 2003
- 902 Reimagining (2006) – Vijay Iyer – originally released on Savoy Jazz in 2005
- 903 Raw Materials (2006) – Vijay Iyer & Rudresh Mahanthappa – originally released on Savoy Jazz in 2006
- 904 Panoptic Modes (2010) – Vijay Iyer – originally released on Red Giant in 2001

== See also ==
- List of record labels
