= Uneasy (album) =

Studio album by Vijay Iyer
- Released: April 9, 2021
- Recorded: December 2019
- Studio: Oktaven Audio Studio; Mount Vernon, New York
- Genre: Free jazz
- Length: 71:46
- Label: ECM 2692
- Producer: Manfred Eicher, Vijay Iyer

Vijay Iyer chronology
The Transitory Poems (2019)	Uneasy (2021)

Uneasy is an album by American pianist and composer Vijay Iyer recorded in December 2019 and released on ECM in April 2021. The trio features rhythm section Linda May Han Oh and Tyshawn Sorey.

== Critical reception ==
Professional ratings
Aggregate scores
Source	Rating
Metacritic	85/100
Review scores
Source	Rating
AllMusic	4/5 stars
The Guardian	4/5 stars
Mojo	4/5 stars
Pitchfork	8.6/10
PopMatters	8/10
Spectrum Culture	88%

On Metacritic, it holds a score of 85 out of 100, indicating "universal acclaim," based on six reviews.

Uneasy ranked forty-second on Pitchfork's list The 50 Best Albums of 2021.

== Track listing ==
All tracks are written by Vijay Iyer except as noted

No.	Title	Writer(s)	Length
1.	"Children of Flint"		6:26
2.	"Combat Breathing"		7:50
3.	"Night and Day"	Cole Porter	9:33
4.	"Touba"	Iyer; Mike Ladd	7:17
5.	"Drummer's Song"	Geri Allen	6:47
6.	"Augury"		3:29
7.	"Configurations"		9:27
8.	"Uneasy"		9:11
9.	"Retrofit"		6:40
10.	"Entrustment"		5:06
Total length:			71:46

== Personnel ==
- Vijay Iyer – piano
- Linda May Han Oh – double bass
- Tyshawn Sorey – drums
