= Accelerando (album) =

Studio album by Vijay Iyer
- Released: March 13, 2012
- Recorded: August 8–9, 2011
- Studio: Sear Sound, New York City
- Genre: Jazz
- Length: 59:49
- Label: ACT Music ACT 9524
- Producer: Vijay Iyer

Vijay Iyer chronology
Tirtha (2011)	Accelerando (2012)	Holding It Down: The Veterans' Dreams Project (2013)

Accelerando is a studio album by Indian-American pianist Vijay Iyer recorded in 2011 and released through the ACT label on March 13, 2012.

== Reception ==
Professional ratings
Aggregate scores
Source	Rating
Metacritic	88/100
Review scores
Source	Rating
AllMusic	4/5 stars
All About Jazz	4.5/5 stars
The Guardian	4/5 stars
Los Angeles Times	4/4 stars
Pitchfork	8.2/10
PopMatters	8/10 stars
musicOMH	4.5/5 stars
Tom Hull	A–

The album received universal acclaim with Metacritic giving it a score of 88 from 9 reviews. Thom Jurek, in his review for AllMusic states, "Accelerando is a triumph in creativity and expert musicianship, and further underscores Iyer's status as a genuine jazz innovator". Writing for All About Jazz, Troy Collins said "Accelerando is a masterful collection that balances high-minded conceptualism with heartfelt conviction". The Guardian review by John Fordham awarded the album 4 stars noting "The world's full of fine jazz piano trios, but Iyer's is way up the A-list". PopMatters editor John Garratt said "Accelerando is an album filled with highlights... There is a reason Vijay Iyer keeps popping up on year-end best-of lists; it’s because he synthesizes such disparate styles, some easily palatable and some requiring more effort, into a striking vision of his own".

== Track listing ==
All compositions by Vijay Iyer except as indicated

1. "Bode" - 2:18
2. "Optimism" - 7:23
3. "The Star of a Story" (Rod Temperton) - 5:46
4. "Human Nature" (Steve Porcaro, John Bettis) - 9:39
5. "Wildflower" (Herbie Nichols) - 4:10
6. "Mmmhmm" (Stephen Bruner, Steve Ellison) - 4:33
7. "Little Pocket Size Demons" (Henry Threadgill) 7:14
8. "Lude" - 4:54
9. "Accelerando" - 2:51
10. "Actions Speak" - 5:38
11. "The Village of the Virgins" (Duke Ellington) - 5:17

== Personnel ==
- Vijay Iyer — piano
- Stephan Crump — bass
- Marcus Gilmore — drums
