= Vijay Iyer =

American musical artist (born 1971)

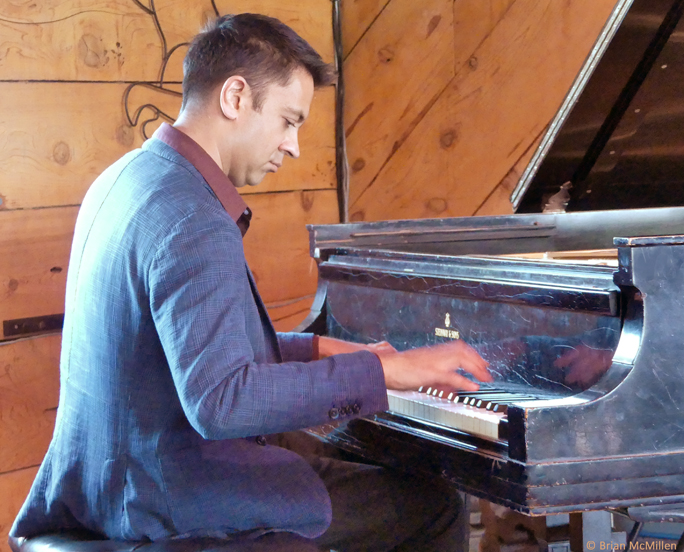
- Vijay Iyer performing in Half Moon Bay, California in 2018 / (photo: Brian McMillen)

Background information
- Born: October 26, 1971 (age 55); Albany, New York, United States
- Genres: Jazz, classical
- Occupations: Composer, musician
- Instrument: Piano
- Labels: ECM, ACT, Verve, Asian Improv, Pi, Artists House, Savoy, Sunnyside
- Website: www.vijay-iyer.com

Vijay Iyer ([ˌvɪdʒeɪ ˈaɪjər]; born Vijay Raghunathan, October 26, 1971) is an American composer, pianist, bandleader, producer, writer, and professor based in New York City. The New York Times has called him a "social conscience, multimedia collaborator, system builder, rhapsodist, historical thinker and multicultural gateway". Iyer received a 2013 MacArthur Fellowship, a Doris Duke Performing Artist Award, a United States Artists Fellowship, three Grammy nominations, and the Alpert Award in the Arts. He was voted Jazz Artist of the Year in the Downbeat magazine international critics' polls in 2012, 2015, 2016, and 2018. In 2014, he was jointly appointed with tenure to Harvard University's departments of music and African American studies as the Franklin D. and Florence Rosenblatt Professor of the Arts.

== Early life and education ==
Born in Albany and raised in Fairport, New York (a suburb of Rochester), he is the son of Indian immigrants to the United States. He received 15 years of Western classical training on violin beginning at the age of three. He began playing the piano by ear in his childhood and is mostly self-taught on that instrument.

After completing a B.S. degree in mathematics and physics at Yale University in 1992, Iyer attended the University of California, Berkeley, where he obtained an M.A. degree in 1994 and initially intended to pursue a doctorate in physics. Some of his early musical innovations related to these academic interests. "I have this love for mathematical rigour and elegance," Iyer explained, "which influences the rhythms, forms and structures of my compositions." One example was his use of the sequence of Fibonacci numbers; in 2009 Iyer wrote, "I became intrigued by these numbers some years ago, and have used them to structure much of my work ever since." While in graduate school he continued to pursue his musical interests, playing in ensembles led by the drummers E. W. Wainwright and Donald Bailey. In 1994, he started working with Steve Coleman and George E. Lewis.

In 1995, concurrently with his composing, recording and touring, he left the Berkeley physics department and assembled an interdisciplinary Ph.D. degree program in technology and the arts, through which he developed a critical intervention on the field of music cognition. His 1998 dissertation, "Microstructures of Feel, Macrostructures of Sound: Embodied Cognition in West African and African-American Musics", applied the dual frameworks of embodied cognition and situated cognition to the music of the African diaspora, challenging the Eurocentric underpinnings of music cognition. His graduate advisor was the music perception and computer music researcher David Wessel, with further guidance from Olly Wilson, George E. Lewis, Donald Glaser and Erv Hafter.

== Composing, performing, bandleading, recording ==
Iyer performs internationally with his ensembles and in collaborations. Among these are his award-winning trios, featured on five albums (Compassion (2024, ECM), Uneasy (2021, ECM), Break Stuff (2015, ECM), Accelerando (2012, ACT) and the Grammy-nominated Historicity (2009, ACT)); his sextet with Graham Haynes, Steve Lehman, Mark Shim, Stephan Crump, and Tyshawn Sorey, featured on Far From Over (2017, ECM); the collaborative trio Fieldwork, documented on four albums (Thereupon (2025), Door (2008), Simulated Progress (2005), and Your Life Flashes (2002), all on Pi Recordings; the collaborative trio of Arooj Aftab, Iyer, and Shahzad Ismaily, documented on Love in Exile (2023, Verve); and his duo project with Wadada Leo Smith, documented on A Cosmic Rhythm with Each Stroke (2016, ECM) and Defiant Life (2025, ECM).

He has collaborated with Amiri Baraka, Teju Cole, Carrie Mae Weems, Wadada Leo Smith, Arooj Aftab, Roscoe Mitchell, Oliver Lake, Henry Threadgill, Reggie Workman, Andrew Cyrille, Amina Claudine Myers, Butch Morris, George E. Lewis, Craig Taborn, Rudresh Mahanthappa, Steve Coleman, Kassa Overall, Linda May Han Oh, Liberty Ellman, Melvin Gibbs, Dafnis Prieto, Ambrose Akinmusire, Robert Stewart, Yosvany Terry, Okkyung Lee, Miya Masaoka, Francis Wong, Hafez Modirzadeh, Amir ElSaffar, Matana Roberts, Trichy Sankaran, L. Subramaniam, Zakir Hussain, Aruna Sairam, Alam Khan, Guitar Prasanna, Pamela Z, Burnt Sugar, Karsh Kale, Mike Ladd, Robin Coste Lewis, Julie Mehretu, DJ Spooky, dead prez, HPrizm, Das Racist, Himanshu Suri, Will Power, Karole Armitage, the Brentano Quartet, the Imani Winds, the International Contemporary Ensemble, the Parker Quartet, Matt Haimovitz, Claire Chase, Jennifer Koh, Miranda Cuckson, Prashant Bhargava and Haile Gerima.

In 2003, Iyer premiered his first collaboration with the poet-producer-performer Mike Ladd, In What Language?, a song cycle about airports, fear and surveillance before and after 9/11, commissioned by the Asia Society and released in 2004 on Pi Recordings. His next project with Ladd, Still Life with Commentator, a satirical oratorio about 24-hour news culture in wartime, was co-commissioned by UNC-Chapel Hill and the Brooklyn Academy of Music for its 2006 Next Wave Festival. It was released on CD by Savoy Jazz. Their third major collaboration, Holding It Down: The Veterans' Dreams Project, focuses on the dreams of young American veterans from the 21st-century wars in Iraq and Afghanistan, and was commissioned by Harlem Stage to premiere in 2012. It was released on CD by Pi Recordings in 2013.

In 1996, Iyer began collaborating with the saxophonist Rudresh Mahanthappa, resulting in five albums under Iyer's name (Architextures (1998), Panoptic Modes (2001), Blood Sutra (2003), Reimagining (2005) and Tragicomic (2008)), three under Mahanthappa's name (Black Water, Mother Tongue, Code Book), and a duo album, Raw Materials (2006).

Iyer was the 2015–16 Artist in Residence at the Metropolitan Museum of Art. He was the music director of the 2017 Ojai Music Festival. Iyer was the Composer-in-Residence at the Wigmore Hall in London for its 2019–20 season.

== Composing for others ==
Iyer has been active as a composer of concert music. His composition Mutations I-X was commissioned and premiered by the string quartet Ethel in 2005. It was released on CD by ECM Records in 2014. His orchestral work Interventions was commissioned and premiered in 2007 by the American Composers Orchestra conducted by Dennis Russell Davies. Iyer co-created the score for Teza (2009) by the filmmaker Haile Gerima. He collaborated with the filmmaker Bill Morrison on the short film and audiovisual installation Release (2009), commissioned by the Eastern State Penitentiary in Philadelphia, Pennsylvania, which is now operated as an historic site.

In 2011, he created Mozart Effects, commissioned by the Brentano String Quartet as a response to an unfinished fragment by Mozart. He also created and performed the score to UnEasy, a ballet choreographed by Karole Armitage and commissioned by Central Park Summerstage. In 2012, the Silk Road Ensemble debuted his commissioned piece, Playlist for an Extreme Occasion, which appears on its 2013 album A Playlist Without Borders. In 2013, the International Contemporary Ensemble premiered his composition Radhe Radhe: Rites of Holi, a large-scale collaboration with the filmmaker Prashant Bhargava commissioned by Carolina Performing Arts in commemoration of the centenary of Igor Stravinsky's The Rite of Spring. In 2013, Brooklyn Rider premiered and recorded his string quartet Dig the Say. In 2014, he premiered Time, Place, Action, a piano quintet he performed with the Brentano Quartet, and Bruits, a sextet for Imani Winds and the pianist Cory Smythe, later recorded on their Grammy-nominated 2021 album of the same name. Later that year, the moving images by Bhargava, combined with Iyer's music, were released by ECM Records. In 2015, he had pieces premiered by the cellist Matt Haimovitz ("Run" for solo cello, an overture to Bach's Cello Suite No. 3) and the violinist Jennifer Koh ("Bridgetower Fantasy", a companion piece to Beethoven's "Kreutzer" Sonata). In 2016, he premiered Emergence for trio and orchestra, with his trio with Stephan Crump and Tyshawn Sorey plus the Leopoldinum Chamber Orchestra in Wrocław, Poland. In 2017, he composed Trouble for violin and orchestra, premiered by Jennifer Koh and International Contemporary Ensemble at Ojai Music Festival, Asunder commissioned by Orpheus Chamber Orchestra and The Law of Returns for piano quartet. In 2018, So Percussion premiered his mallet quartet Torque at Caramoor Summer Music Festival. In 2019, Iyer composed Crisis Modes for strings and percussion, co-commissioned by the Los Angeles Philharmonic, Kölner Philharmonie and Wigmore Hall, Hallucination Party commissioned by Mishka Rushdie Momen and recorded on her album Variations, and Song for Flint for viola solo, commissioned by Miller Theatre at Columbia University and premiered in Iyer's Portrait Concert there on October 24, 2019.

Other works include For Violin Alone written for Jennifer Koh, My Boy (Song of Remembrance) composed for Boston Lyric Opera, Plinth (for Kwame Ture) composed for Shai Wosner, The Window composed for Inbal Segev and Iyer, Equal Night composed for Matt Haimovitz, For My Father composed for Sarah Rothenberg and Disunities composed for Lydian Quartet with David Krakauer.

Iyer's concert works are published by Schott Music.

In 2013 he collaborated with filmmaker Prashant Bhargava on the multidisciplinary project Radhe Radhe: Rites Of Holi dealing with springtime rituals in India. The project was commissioned to commemorate the 100th anniversary of Igor Stravinsky's The Rite Of Spring, with Iyer's score to Bhargava's film performed live by the International Contemporary Ensemble. Bhargava died at the age of 42 by heart attack in May 2015. In memory of him Iyer as the music director of the 2017 Ojai Music Festival has staged the film score as a live act with members of the Oberlin Ensemble and the International Contemporary Ensemble conducted by UC San Diego music professor Steven Schick.

== Teaching and writing ==
In 2014, Iyer joined the senior faculty in the Department of Music at Harvard University as the Franklin D. and Florence Rosenblatt Professor of the Arts. In 2017, he received a joint appointment with Harvard's Department of African and African American Studies.

From 2013 to 2021, Iyer was the artistic director of the International Workshop in Jazz and Creative Music at the Banff Centre for Arts and Creativity (jointly with co-artistic director Tyshawn Sorey starting in 2017).

Previously, Iyer was a faculty member at the Manhattan School of Music, New York University, The New School and the School for Improvisational Music.

His writings have appeared in various journals and anthologies.

Iyer is a member of Faculty and Staff for Justice in Palestine (FSJP). He has delivered statements on behalf of FJSP during the 2024 Harvard encampment.

Iyer can be seen as a contemporary musicologist who is most interested in researching not historical but improvisational music.

- 1998: “Microstructures of Feel, Macrostructures of Sound: Embodied Cognition in West African and African-American Musics.” Ph.D. dissertation, University of California, Berkeley.
- 2002: “Being Home: Jazz Authority and the Politics of Place.” Current Musicology 71-73: 462–476.
- 2004: “Exploding the Narrative in Jazz Improvisation.” In O’Meally, R., B. Edwards & F. Griffin, eds., Uptown Conversation: The New Jazz Studies. New York: Columbia University Press.
- 2006: “Sangha: Collaborative improvisations on community.” Critical Studies in Improvisation / Etudes critiques en improvisation 1(3).
- 2008: “On Improvisation, Temporality, and Embodied Experience.” In Miller, P., ed., Sound Unbound: Sampling Digital Music and Culture. Cambridge, MA: MIT Press, p. 273-292
- 2014: “Improvisation, Action Understanding, and Music Cognition With and Without Bodies.” In Lewis, George E., and Benjamin Piekut, eds. The Oxford Handbook of Critical Improvisation Studies. New York: Oxford University Press.
- 2019: “Beneath Improvisation.” In Rehding, Alexander and Steven Rings, eds., The Oxford Handbook of Critical Concepts in Music Theory. New York: Oxford University Press.
- 2020 “The Deft, Quiet Shout of Her Hands: Geri Allen’s Speculative Musicalities.” Jazz and Culture vol. 4.
- 2021 “What’s not music, but feels like music to you?” Behavioral and Brain Sciences Volume 44: e79.
- 2021 “The Law of Returns: Muhal Richard Abrams and Vijay Iyer in Conversation.” In Oja, Carol, and Charles Hiroshi Garrett, eds., Sounding Together: Collaborative Perspectives on U.S. Music in the 21st Century. Ann Arbor: University of Michigan Press.
- 2023 “On Black Speculative Musicalities,” in Kelly, M, and M. Roelofs, eds., Black Art and Aesthetics: Relationalities, Interiorities, Reckonings. New York: Bloomsbury Academic.

He is aside from that a Steinway artist and uses Ableton Live software.

== Awards and honors ==
Iyer's recording Uneasy was listed among the best albums of 2021 in Pitchfork, The New Yorker, JazzTimes, The Boston Globe, PopMatters, and the ArtsFuse jazz critics' poll. His sextet album Far From Over was named one of the best albums of 2017 in Rolling Stone, The New York Times, Los Angeles Times, Chicago Tribune and Slate and was voted the number one jazz album of 2017 in the NPR critics' poll.

His trio album Break Stuff received five stars (highest rating) in the March 2015 issue of DownBeat magazine, was listed as one of the best albums of 2015 in Time, NPR, Slate, The New York Times, the Los Angeles Times, The Boston Globe, AllMusic, and PopMatters, and won the Preis der deutschen Schallplattenkritik (the German record critics' prize) of the year.

Iyer received the 2003 Alpert Award in the Arts, a 2006 fellowship from the New York Foundation for the Arts, and commissioning grants from the Rockefeller Foundation, the New York State Council on the Arts, Creative Capital, the Mary Flagler Cary Charitable Trust, the American Composers Forum, Chamber Music America and Meet the Composer. He was named one of the "50 most influential global Indians" by GQ India and he received the 2010 India Abroad Publisher's Award for Special Excellence.

He was awarded a 2012 Doris Duke Performing Artist Award, the 2012 Greenfield Prize for Music, and an unprecedented "quintuple crown" in the 2012 DownBeat International Jazz Critics Poll, in which he was voted Artist of the Year, Pianist of the Year, Small Group of the Year (for the Vijay Iyer Trio), Album of the Year (for Accelerando) and Rising Star Composer of the Year. He received a 2013 MacArthur fellowship, a 2013 Trailblazer Award by the Association of South Asians in Media, Marketing and Entertainment (SAMMA), and a 2013 ECHO Award for Best Jazz Pianist (International). He received a 2014 United States Artists Fellowship. He was voted 2014 Pianist of the Year and 2015 Jazz Artist of the Year in the DownBeat International Jazz Critics Poll. He was the critics' Jazz Artist of the Year again in 2016 and in 2018, and his sextet was voted 2018 Jazz Group of the Year. He was also voted Artist of the Year in JazzTimes's 2017 Critics' Poll and the 2017 Readers' Poll.

== Political and social advocacy ==
Critics and scholars have consistently described Iyer's artistic work as inseparable from his political and social concerns. Jazz critic Nate Chinen, writing for WBGO, observed that "artistry and activism have always been fully entwined in the music of Vijay Iyer."

=== Music as political expression ===
Several of Iyer's compositions address specific political and social events. "Combat Breathing" was written in 2014 to accompany a political action at the Brooklyn Academy of Music during early Black Lives Matter protests, taking its title from a term associated with the deaths of Eric Garner and others. "Children of Flint," released on Uneasy (2021), is dedicated to the children of Flint, Michigan, whose drinking water was contaminated with lead through what Iyer described as "gross negligence and systematic racism." Compassion (2024) includes further memorial works: "Arch," dedicated to Desmond Tutu, and "It Goes," dedicated to Emmett Till.

Iyer's earlier large-scale collaborative works with poet-producer Mike Ladd also engaged directly with political subjects: In What Language? (2003) addressed airports, racial profiling, and surveillance following 9/11, while Holding It Down: The Veterans' Dreams Project (2013) drew on interviews with veterans of color from the wars in Iraq and Afghanistan.

In 2024, Iyer premiered What Isn't Hard to See, a set of four nocturnes for violin and piano commissioned by the McKim Fund at the Library of Congress. The third nocturne is dedicated to Refaat Alareer, a Palestinian writer killed in an Israeli airstrike in December 2023, and the work as a whole is dedicated to the Palestinian people. Iyer donated his commission fee to Palestinian causes. A related composition, "Kite (for Refaat Alareer)," appeared on his duo album Defiant Life with Wadada Leo Smith (ECM, 2025).

=== Institutional advocacy ===
Iyer is a member of Harvard Faculty and Staff for Justice in Palestine (FSJP). In April 2024, during a pro-Palestinian encampment in Harvard Yard, he spoke on behalf of FSJP and called on the university to reinstate the suspended Harvard Undergraduate Palestine Solidarity Committee. At a Harvard Faculty of Arts and Sciences meeting in May 2024, Iyer questioned the administration's stance on Israel, asking "Why isn't a conversation about divestment on the table?" Speaking to GBH News at the time, he described the encampment movement as addressing "one of the most burning issues facing the world today."

In January 2026, Iyer was elected to the Pulitzer Prize Board.

== Discography ==
=== As leader/co-leader ===
List of albums as leader or co-leader
Year recorded	Title	Label	Year released	Notes
1995	Memorophilia	Asian Improv	1995	One track solo piano; three tracks trio, with Jeff Brock (bass), Brad Hargreaves (drums); two tracks quartet, with Steve Coleman (alto sax) added; one track quartet with Liberty Ellman (guitar), Jeff Bilmes (electric bass), Elliot Humberto Kavee (drums); two tracks quintet, with Francis Wong (tenor sax), George Lewis (trombone), Kash Killion (cello), Kavee (drums)
1996	Architextures	Asian Improv/Red Giant	1998	Two tracks solo piano, four tracks trio, with Jeff Brock (bass), Brad Hargreaves (drums), six tracks octet, with Eric Crystal (soprano and tenor sax), Aaron Stewart (tenor sax), Rudresh Mahanthappa (alto sax), Liberty Ellman (guitar), and Kevin Ellington Mingus (bass) added
2000	Panoptic Modes	Red Giant	2001	Quartet, with Rudresh Mahanthappa (alto sax), Stephan Crump (bass), Derrek Phillips (drums)
2002	Your Life Flashes	Pi	2002	As Fieldwork; trio, with Aaron Stewart (tenor sax), Elliot Humberto Kavee (drums)
2003	In What Language?	Pi	2003	Joint with Mike Ladd, feat. Latasha N. Nevada Diggs, Ajay Naidu, Alison Easter, Rudresh Mahanthappa, Ambrose Akinmusire, Dana Leong, Liberty Ellman, Stephan Crump, Trevor Holder. Co-produced by Scotty Hard
2003	Blood Sutra	Artists House	2003	Quartet, with Rudresh Mahanthappa (alto sax), Stephan Crump (bass), Tyshawn Sorey (drums)
2004	Simulated Progress	Pi	2005	As Fieldwork; trio, with Steve Lehman (alto sax, sopranino sax), Elliot Humberto Kavee (drums)
2004	Reimagining	Savoy	2005	Quartet, with Rudresh Mahanthappa (alto sax), Stephan Crump (bass), Marcus Gilmore (drums)
2005	Raw Materials	Savoy	2006	Duo, with Rudresh Mahanthappa (alto sax)
2006	Still Life with Commentator	Savoy	2007	With Mike Ladd
2007	Tragicomic	Sunnyside	2008	Quartet, with Rudresh Mahanthappa (alto sax), Stephan Crump (bass), Marcus Gilmore (drums)
2007	Door	Pi	2008	As Fieldwork; trio, with Steve Lehman (alto sax, sopranino sax), Tyshawn Sorey (drums)
2008–09	Historicity	ACT	2009	Trio, with Stephan Crump (bass), Marcus Gilmore (drums)
2010	Solo	ACT	2010	Solo piano
2011?	Tirtha	ACT	2011	Trio, with Prasanna (guitar, vocals), Nitin Mitta (tabla)
2012?	Accelerando	ACT	2012	Trio, with Stephan Crump (bass), Marcus Gilmore (drums)
2013?	Holding It Down: The Veterans' Dreams Project	Pi	2013	With Mike Ladd
2013	Mutations	ECM	2014	Some tracks solo piano and electronics; some tracks quintet, with Michi Wiancko and Miranda Cuckson (violin), Kyle Armbrust (viola), Kivie Cahn-Lipman (cello)
2014?	Radhe Radhe: Rites of Holi	ECM	2014	Score composed by Vijay Iyer and performed live with the film of the same name by Prashant Bhargava. Featuring Iyer, International Contemporary Ensemble, Tyshawn Sorey, Amir ElSaffar.
2014	Break Stuff	ECM	2015	Trio, with Stephan Crump (bass), Marcus Gilmore (drums)
2016	A Cosmic Rhythm with Each Stroke	ECM	2016	Duo, with Wadada Leo Smith (trumpet)
2017	Far from Over	ECM	2017	Sextet, with Graham Haynes (cornet, flugelhorn, electronics), Mark Shim (tenor sax), Steve Lehman (alto sax), Stephan Crump (bass), Tyshawn Sorey (drums)
2018	The Transitory Poems	ECM	2019	Duo, with Craig Taborn (piano)
2019	Uneasy	ECM	2021	Trio, with Linda May Han Oh (double bass) and Tyshawn Sorey (drums), released in April 2021
2020?	InWhatStrumentals	Pi	2020	Joint with Mike Ladd, Instrumental dub of In What Language?, featuring Rudresh Mahanthappa, Ambrose Akinmusire, Dana Leong, Liberty Ellman, Stephan Crump, Trevor Holder. Co-produced by Scotty Hard, originally recorded 2003
Unknown	Love in Exile	Verve	2023	Joint with Arooj Aftab and Shahzad Ismaily
2022	Compassion	ECM	2024	Trio with Oh and Sorey
2024	Defiant Life	ECM	2025	Duo, with Wadada Leo Smith (trumpet)
2024	Thereupon	Pi	2025	As Fieldwork; trio, with Steve Lehman (alto sax), Tyshawn Sorey (drums)

=== As a featured pianist ===
With Rez Abbasi

- Unfiltered Universe (Whirlwind, 2017)
- Suno Suno (Enja, 2011)
- Things to Come (Sunnyside, 2009)

With Burnt Sugar (led by Greg Tate)

- All Ya Needs That Negrocity (2011)
- More Than Posthuman: Rise of the Mojosexual Cotillion (2006)
- If You Can't Dazzle Them With Your Brilliance, Then Baffle Them With Your Blisluth (2005)
- Not April in Paris: Live from Banlieus Bleues (2004)
- Black Sex Yall Liberation & Bloody Random Violets (2003)
- The Rites: Conductions Inspired by Stravinsky's Le Sacre du Printemps (2003)
- That Depends On What You Know (2001)
- Blood on the Leaf: Opus No. 1 (2000)

With Steve Coleman

- The Ascension to Light (BMG France, 1999)
- The Sonic Language of Myth (BMG France, 1998)
- Genesis (BMG France, 1997)
- Myths, Modes and Means: Live at Hot Brass, Paris (BMG France, 1995)

With Mike Ladd

- Mike Ladd Presents Father Divine (ROIR, 2005)
- Negrophilia: The Album (Thirsty Ear, 2005)
- The Nostalgialator (!K7, 2004)

With Rudresh Mahanthappa

- Code Book (Pi, 2006)
- Mother Tongue (Pi, 2004)
- Black Water (Red Giant, 2002)

With Roscoe Mitchell

- Far Side (ECM, 2007)
- Song for My Sister (Pi, 2002)

Iyer and Wadada Leo Smith performing in Knoxville, TN, 2025

With Wadada Leo Smith

- Defiant Life (ECM, 2025)
- A Love Sonnet for Billie Holiday (as Wadada Leo Smith / Vijay Iyer / Jack DeJohnette) (TUM, 2021)
- A Cosmic Rhythm with Each Stroke (ECM, 2016)
- Spiritual Dimensions (Cuneiform, 2009)
- Tabligh (Cuneiform, 2008)
- Eclipse (concert film, 2005)

With others

- ganavya, Daughter of a Temple (Leiter Verlag, 2024—V.I. is featured on the piece "Om Supreme")
- Arooj Aftab, Night Reign (Verve Records, 2024—V.I. is featured on "Saaqi")
- Heems, Veena (Veena Sounds/Mass Appeal India, 2024—V.I. is featured on "Manto")
- Kassa Overall, Animals (Warp Records, 2023 - V.I. is featured on "The Score Was Made")
- Ivo Perelman, Brass and Ivory Tales: Tale 9 duo CD (Fundacja Słuchaj, 2021)
- Aggregate Prime (Ralph Peterson), Dream Deferred (Aggregate Prime, 2016)
- Arturo O'Farrill, The Offense of the Drum (Motéma, 2014)
- Pete Robbins, Pyramid (Hate Laugh, 2014)
- Trio 3 (Oliver Lake/Reggie Workman/Andrew Cyrille), Wiring (Intakt, 2014)
- Hafez Modirzadeh, Post-Chromodal Out! (Pi, 2012)
- Dave Douglas, Orange Afternoons (Greenleaf, 2011)
- Das Racist, Sit Down, Man (Greedhead / Mad Decent, 2010)
- Steve Lehman, Demian as Posthuman (Pi, 2005)
- Amiri Baraka, The Shani Project (Brown Sound, 2004)

=== Compositions recorded by others ===
- For My Father performed by Sarah Rothenberg on In Darkness and Light (Da Camera Editions, 2026)
- Crown Thy Good performed by Min Kwon on America/Beautiful (Delos, 2026)
- Torque performed by Sō Percussion on 25x25 (Sō Percussion, 2025)
- Crisis Modes, Trouble, & Asunder on Vijay Iyer: Trouble, a composer portrait album by Boston Modern Orchestra Project conducted by Gil Rose with Jennifer Koh, violin (BMOP/sound, 2024)
- Crown Thy Good performed by Laura Downes on Love at Last (Pentatone, 2023)
- Dig The Say performed by PUBLIQuartet on What Is American (Bright Shiny Things, 2022)
- The Window for cello and piano, performed by Inbal Segev and Vijay Iyer on 20 for 2020, vol II (Avie, 2021)
- For Violin Alone, performed by Jennifer Koh on Alone Together (Cedille, 2021)
- Equal Night, performed by Matt Haimovitz on Primavera I: The Wind (Pentatone, 2021)
- My Boy (Song of Remembrance), performed by Justin Vivian Bond as part of Desert In, a collaborative tele-opera released as a limited television series by Boston Lyric Opera, 2021
- Bruits for wind quintet and piano, performed by Imani Winds and Cory Smythe on Bruits (Bright Shiny Things, 2021)
- The Diamond for violin and piano, performed by Jennifer Koh and Vijay Iyer on Limitless (Cedille, 2019)
- Hallucination Party for piano, performed by Mishka Rushdie Momen on Variations (Somm, 2019)
- Run for solo cello, performed by Matt Haimovitz on Overtures to Bach (Oxingale, 2015)
- Dig The Say for string quartet, performed by Brooklyn Rider on Brooklyn Rider Almanac (Mercury Classics, 2014)
- Playlist for an Extreme Occasion performed by Silk Road Ensemble on Playlist Without Borders (Sony Classical, 2013)
- Playlist One (Resonance) for solo violin, performed by Cornelius Dufallo (Innova Records, 2012)
