= Jeffrey Brock =

American mathematician

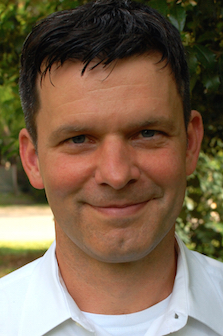
A recent picture of Jeffrey Brock

Jeffrey Farlowe Brock (born June 14, 1970, in Bronxville, New York) is an American mathematician, working in low-dimensional geometry and topology. He is known for his contributions to the understanding of hyperbolic 3-manifolds and the geometry of Teichmüller spaces.

Since July 2018, Brock has been a professor of mathematics at Yale University, and in January 2019 he became the first FAS (Faculty of Arts and Sciences) dean of science at Yale. In July 2019, he was additionally appointed Dean of the Yale School of Engineering & Applied Science.

Before joining Yale, he was a professor at Brown University, and also founding director of the Data Science Initiative at Brown University.

== Biography ==
Brock obtained a BA (with distinction in Mathematics) from Yale University in 1992. He completed a Ph.D. in mathematics from the University of California, Berkeley in 1997, under the supervision of Curtis T. McMullen.

Brock then held positions as (NSF-funded) Szego Assistant Professor at Stanford University (1997–2000), assistant professor at the University of Chicago (2000–2003), and Donald D. Harrington Faculty Fellow at the University of Texas at Austin (2003–2004). He became associate professor with tenure at Brown University in 2004, and a full professor in 2007. He was chair of the Mathematics Department from 2013 to 2017.

Brock has been associate director of ICERM since 2013. Previously, he had been deputy director between 2010 and 2013.

Since July 2018, Brock has been a professor of mathematics at Yale University, and in January 2019 he became the first FAS (Faculty of Arts and Sciences) dean of science at Yale. In July 2019, he was additionally appointed Dean of the Yale School of Engineering & Applied Science.

Brock is also an accomplished jazz musician. He was the founding bassist of the Vijay Iyer Trio, led by the acclaimed jazz pianist Vijay Iyer.

He is married and has three children.

== Research ==
Jeffrey Brock's research focuses on low-dimensional topology and geometry, particularly on spaces with hyperbolic geometry or negative curvature. His joint work with Richard Canary and Yair Minsky resulted in a solution to the "Ending Lamination Conjecture" of William Thurston, culminating in the geometric classification theorem for (topologically finite) hyperbolic 3-manifolds in terms of their fundamental group and the structure of their ends.

More recently, he has worked to understand applications of geometry and topology to the structure of massive and complex data sets and the risks and implications of the increasing use of 'black box' algorithms in science and society.

== Honors and awards ==
- Fellow of the American Mathematical Society, 2017.
- Simons Fellowship (declined), 2016.
- John Simon Guggenheim Fellow, 2008.
- Donald D. Harrington Faculty Fellow, University of Texas at Austin, 2003–2004.
- National Science Foundation Postdoctoral Fellow, Stanford University, 1997–2000.
- Alfred P. Sloan Doctoral Dissertation Fellow, U.C. Berkeley, 1996–1997.
- Outstanding Graduate Student Instructor Award, U.C. Berkeley, 1996.
- National Science Foundation Graduate Fellow, U.C. Berkeley, 1993–1996.
- Stanley and DeForest Mathematics Prizes, Yale University, 1991 and 1992.

== Selected invited talks ==
- Geometric Topology in Low Dimensions (University of Warwick), 2017.
- Geometry, Topology and Dynamics of Moduli Spaces (National University of Singapore), 2016.
- Classical and quantum hyperbolic geometry and topology (Orsay), 2015.
- Hyperbolic Geometry and Minimal Surfaces (IMPA), 2015.
- Hyperbolic Geometry and Geometric Group Theory (Tokyo), 2014.

== Selected publications ==
- (with Nathan Dunfield) "Norms on the cohomology of hyperbolic 3-manifolds", Invent. Math. 210 (2017), no. 2, 531–558.
- (with Yair Minsky, Hossein Namazi and Juan Souto), "Bounded combinatorics and uniform models for hyperbolic 3-manifolds." J. Topol. 9 (2016), no. 2, 451–501.
- (with Richard Canary and Yair Minsky) "The classification of Kleinian surface groups, II: The ending lamination conjecture." Ann. of Math. (2) 176 (2012), no. 1, 1–149.
- (with Benson Farb) "Curvature and rank of Teichmüller space." Amer. J. Math. 128 (2006), no. 1, 1–22.
- (with Kenneth Bromberg) "On the density of geometrically finite Kleinian groups." Acta Math. 192 (2004), no. 1, 33–93.
- "The Weil–Petersson metric and volumes of 3-dimensional hyperbolic convex cores." J. Amer. Math. Soc. 16 (2003), no. 3, 495–535.
- "Iteration of mapping classes and limits of hyperbolic 3-manifolds." Invent. Math. 143 (2001), no. 3, 523–570.
- "Boundaries of Teichmüller spaces and end-invariants for hyperbolic 3-manifolds." Duke Math. J. 106 (2001), no. 3, 527–552.
