= Mark Shim =

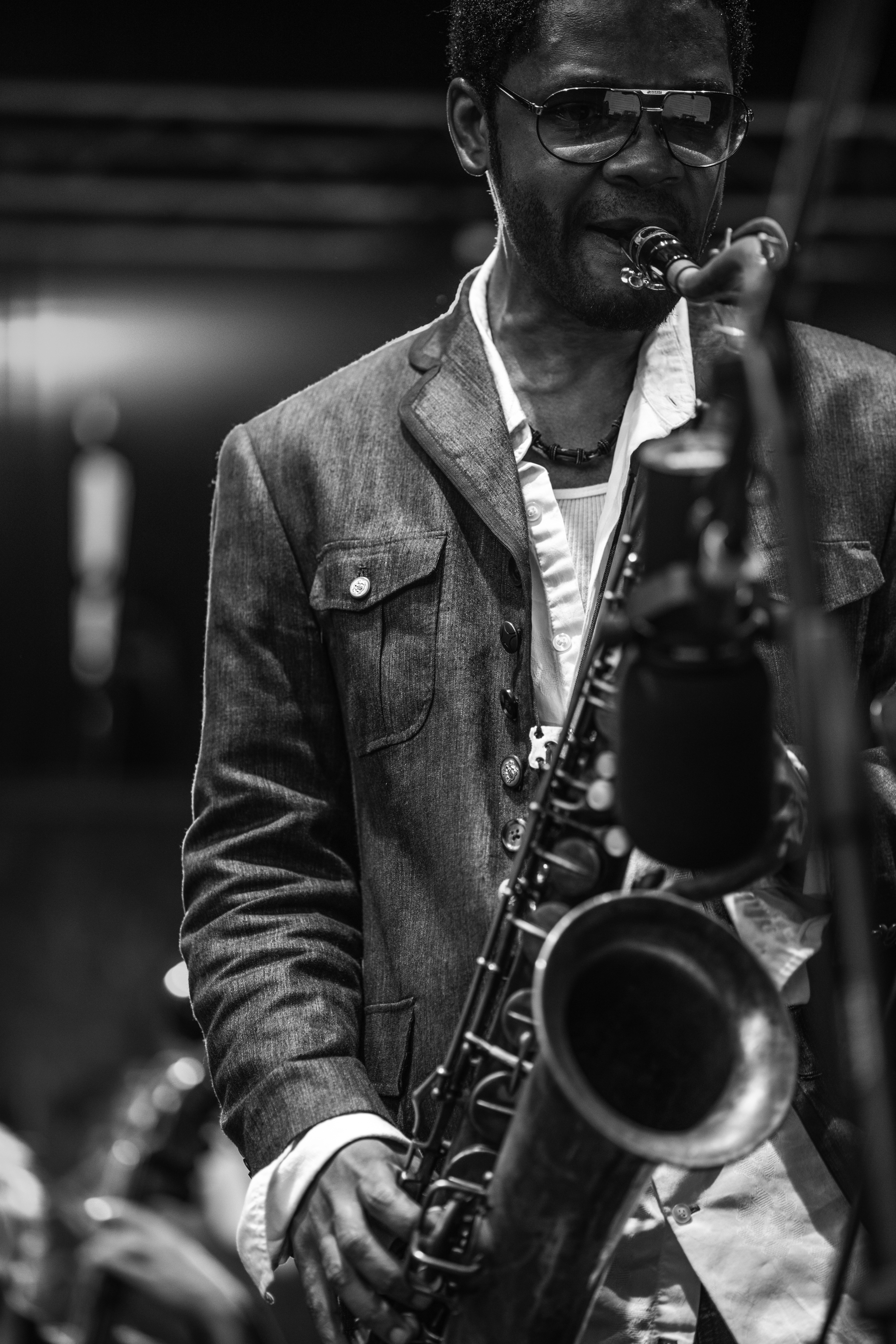
- Shim performing at International Jazz Festival of Punta del Este in 2015.

Background information
- Born: November 21, 1973 (age 52); Kingston, Jamaica
- Genres: Jazz
- Instrument: Tenor saxophone

Mark Shim (born November 21, 1973, in Kingston, Jamaica) is a jazz tenor saxophonist.

== History ==
Shim's family moved from Kingston to Canada when he was eight years old, and then settled in Richmond, Virginia, five years later. He started on sax in seventh grade, graduating from high school in 1991 and attending Virginia Commonwealth University and William Paterson College. In 1994 he moved to Brooklyn, where he played and recorded with Hamiett Bluiett in Harlem. He then played with Elvin Jones, Mose Allison, Betty Carter, Greg Osby, and the Mingus Big Band. Shim's debut record for Blue Note appeared in 1998, with two more following on the label in 2000.

== Discography ==
- Mind over Matter (Blue Note, 1998)
- New Directions with Stefon Harris, Jason Moran, Greg Osby (Blue Note, 2000)
- Turbulent Flow (Blue Note, 2000)
- Purpose with Curtis Lundy (Justin Time, 2002)
- Far from Over with Vijay Iyer (ECM, 2017)
- Travail, Transformation, and Flow with the Steve Lehman Octet (Pi Recordings, 2009)
- Mise en Abîme with the Steve Lehman Octet (Pi Recordings, 2014)
