= Prashant Bhargava =

American film director

- Born: January 12, 1973; Chicago, Illinois, U.S.
- Died: May 15, 2015 (aged 42); New York City, U.S.
- Occupation: Director
- Notable work: Patang : The Kite

Prashant Bhargava (January 12, 1973 – May 15, 2015) was an Indian-American filmmaker and designer. He died of a heart attack from a history of heart trouble. Bhargava's short film Sangam, described by Greg Tate of the Village Voice as "an elegant and poetic evocation of immigrant angst, memory and haunted spirituality", premiered at the Sundance Film Festival, and PBS. His other directorial efforts include the documentary portrait of his grandmother Ammaji, experimental Super 8 short Backwaters and the poignant and meditative Kashmir, an audiovisual performance with band Dawn of Midi

Bhargava's feature-length directorial debut, Patang : The Kite (2012) was premiered at the Berlin International Film Festival and Tribeca Film Festival. The film was subsequently released in the U.S. and Canada, garnered much attention with rave reviews from the New York Times, and Los Angeles Times. Movie critic Roger Ebert gave the film 4 out of 4 stars, inviting Prashant to present the film at Ebertfest.

His film "Radhe Radhe" (2014) has been dealing with springtime rituals in India. So he asked Vijay Iyer to contribute the sound track based on the coincidence of the 100th anniversary of Stravinsky's "[The] Rite Of Spring". And the jazz musician and 2014 appointed Rosenblatt Professor of the Arts at Harvard University said okay and contributed as film composer and created a live score to it working with the International Contemporary Ensemble.

Bhargava died at the age of 42 in 2015. In memory of him Vijay Iyer as the music director of the 2017 Ojai Music Festival has staged the film score in 2017 as a live act with members of the Oberlin Ensemble and the International Contemporary Ensemble conducted by UC San Diego music professor Steven Schick while the film was shown on a large screen above the heads of the musicians.

== Background ==
Bhargava was born and raised on the south side of Chicago, a graduate of Kenwood Academy. His interest in the arts began in his youth, when he was a graffiti artist. Bhargava studied computer science at Cornell University and theatrical directing at the Barrow Group and at the Actors Studio MFA program.

== Filmography ==
- Radhe Radhe (2014)
- Patang : The Kite (2012)
- Kashmir (2011)
- Ammaji (2014)
- Backwaters (2005)
- Sangam (2004)
