= Teertha, Dharwad =

Teertha
- village
- Country: India
- State: Karnataka
- District: Dharwad

Population (2011)
  - Total: 784

Languages
  - Official: Kannada
- Time zone: UTC+5:30 (IST)

Teertha is a village in the southern state of Karnataka, India. It is located in the Kundgol taluk of Dharwad district.

== Demographics ==
As of the 2011 Census of India there were 168 households in Teertha and a total population of 784 consisting of 425 males and 359 females. There were 122 children ages 0-6.
