= Blood Sutra =

Studio album by Vijay Iyer
- Released: October 21, 2003
- Recorded: February 21, 2003
- Studio: Sorcerer Sound, New York
- Genre: Jazz
- Length: 58:10
- Label: Artists House AH 9
- Producer: Vijay Iyer

Vijay Iyer chronology
In What Language? (2003)	Blood Sutra (2003)	Simulated Progress (2004)

Blood Sutra is an album by pianist Vijay Iyer recorded in 2003 and originally released on the Artists House label before being reissued on Pi Recordings in 2006.

== Reception ==
Professional ratings
Review scores
Source	Rating
Allmusic	4/5 stars
Tom Hull	A–
The Penguin Guide to Jazz Recordings	4/4 stars

The AllMusic review by Thom Jurek said, "Blood Sutra only adds more luster to Iyer's presence on the short list of forward-looking jazz creators these days. His muse still tends towards the severe but there's no denying the individuality and the fact he doesn't make the listening easy is also precisely what makes it so rewarding". Writing for All About Jazz, Dan McCleneghan observed, "An initial listen to Blood Sutra had me thinking "no new ground broken here" since Panoptic Modes and You Life Flashes (Pi Records, 2002) by Fieldwork, an Iyer trio vehicle. But a "sit down and concentrate on the sounds" session reveals nuances and subtle shadings creeping in ... Vijay Iyer evolves in fascinating fashion". The JazzTimes review by Nate Chinen noted, "This is exciting and eminently listenable stuff, intuitive in bearing and dynamic in execution.

An essential for adventurous listeners, Blood Sutra could also serve as an ideal introduction to Iyer's burgeoning oeuvre".

== Track listing ==
All compositions by Vijay Iyer except where noted

1. "Proximity (Crossroads)" – 2:12
2. "Brute Facts" – 6:10
3. "Habeas Corpus" – 5:58
4. "Ascent" – 1:22
5. "When History Sleeps" – 6:07
6. "Questions of Agency" – 5:11
7. "Kinship" – 6:10
8. "Stigmatism" – 4:02
9. "That Much Music" – 2:31
10. "Imagined Nations" – 6:11
11. "Because of Guns (Hey Joe Redux)" – 7:47 contains elements of "Hey Joe" by Billy Roberts
12. "Desiring" – 4:34

== Personnel ==
- Vijay Iyer – piano
- Rudresh Mahanthappa – alto saxophone
- Stefan Crump – bass
- Tyshawn Sorey – drums
