= Raw Materials (album) =

Studio album by Vijay Iyer & Rudresh Mahanthappa
- Released: May 23, 2006
- Recorded: October 4, 2005
- Studios: Clubhouse, Rhinebeck, NY
- Genre: Jazz
- Length: 1:08:58
- Label: Savoy Jazz SVY 17603
- Producers: Vijay Iyer, Rudresh Mahanthappa, Cookie Marenco

Vijay Iyer chronology
Reimagining (2005)	Raw Materials (2006)	Still Life with Commentator (2007)

Professional ratings
Review scores
Source	Rating
AllMusic	4/5 stars
All About Jazz	4.5/5 stars
Tom Hull	B
The Penguin Guide to Jazz Recordings	3/4 stars

Raw Materials is a studio album by American jazz pianist Vijay Iyer and American jazz saxophonist Rudresh Mahanthappa. The album was released on May 23, 2006 via Savoy Jazz label.

== Reception ==
David R. Adler of JazzTimes stated "The two cover plenty of ground but aren’t at all longwinded. Somehow their impeccable precision enhances rather than limits their improvisational freedom. Their challenging rhythmic syntax, well documented on their respective quartet discs, takes on a greater immediacy in the duo context".

Jonathan Widran of AllMusic wrote "For the first time, they distill their otherworldly, closely entwined musical language into a 13-track recording on Raw Materials -- the first 12 of which are from the suite "Sangha: Collaborative Fables," which was commissioned by the Jazz Gallery with a grant from the Rockefeller Foundation Multi-Arts Production Fund... They're a brilliantly talented, visionary but unusual pair whose debut will appeal mostly to jazz and classical fans with open minds".

== Track listing ==
No.	Title	Writer(s)	Length
1.	"The Shape of Things"	Mahanthappa, Iyer	3:25
2.	"All the Names"	Iyer	5:04
3.	"Forgotten System"	Mahanthappa	5:43
4.	"Remembrance"	Iyer	4:27
5.	"Frontlash"	Iyer	4:23
6.	"Five Fingers Make a Fist"	Mahanthappa	2:58
7.	"Inside the Machine"	Iyer	3:07
8.	"Stronger Than Itself"	Iyer	2:17
9.	"Come Back"	Mahanthappa	6:19
10.	"Fly Higher"	Mahanthappa	3:10
11.	"Common Ground"	Mahanthappa	5:54
12.	"Rataplan"	Iyer	4:15
13.	"Hope"	Mahanthappa	6:01
Total length:			1:08:58

== Personnel ==
- Vijay Iyer – arranger, piano, producer
- Rudresh Mahanthappa – arranger, composer, producer, saxophone
