= Rudresh Mahanthappa =

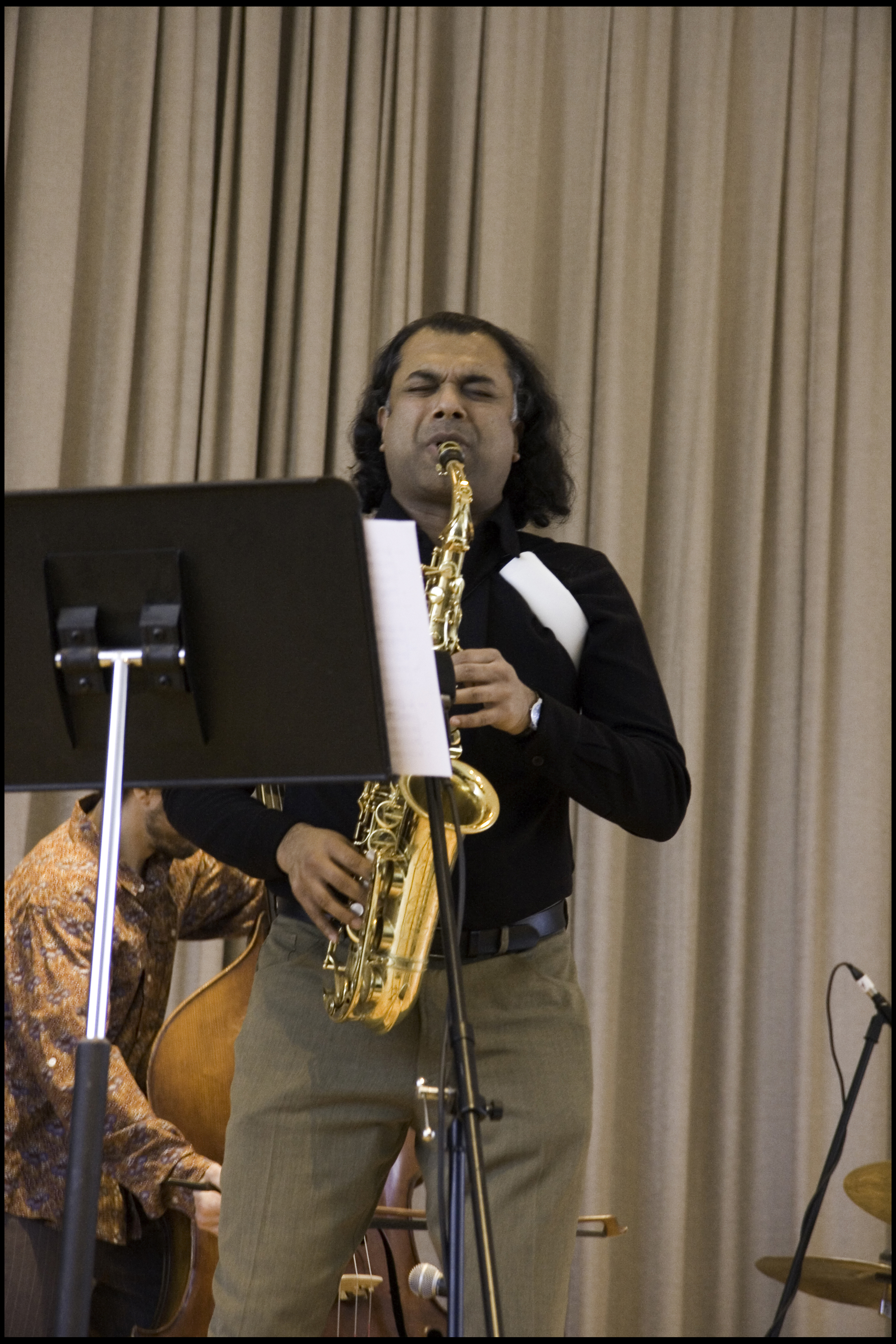

Background information
- Born: May 4, 1971 (age 54); Trieste, Italy
- Genres: Jazz, avant-garde jazz
- Occupations: Musician, composer
- Instrument: Alto saxophone
- Years active: 1990s–present
- Labels: Pi, ACT
- Website: www.rudreshm.com

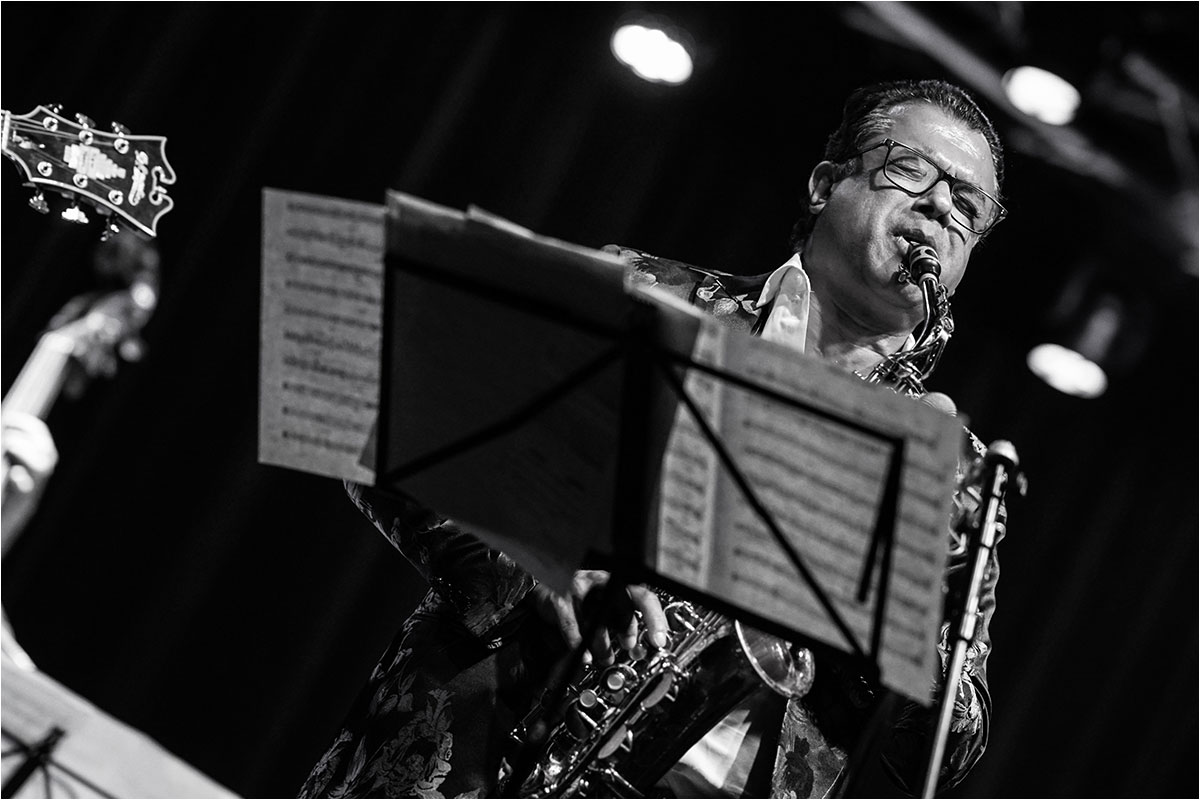
Denmark 2019 Photo Hreinn Gudlaugsson

Rudresh Mahanthappa (born May 4, 1971) is a New York-based jazz alto saxophonist and composer.

== Biography ==
Mahanthappa is the son of Kodava Indian emigrants to the U.S. He was born in Trieste, Italy as a result of his father's job in academia, but spent most of his life in Boulder, Colorado. He graduated from Fairview High School in 1988, subsequently receiving a BM from the Berklee College of Music in 1992 and an MM in jazz composition from Chicago's DePaul University in 1998.

After moving to New York City in 1997, he released the album Architextures with pianist Vijay Iyer. The two would continue to collaborate often, releasing the albums Black Water, Mother Tongue and Codebook with Mahanthappa's quartet, and Raw Materials as a duo.

Mahanthappa is currently the Anthony P. Lee'79 Director of Jazz at Princeton University, where he teaches improvisation and directs small groups. In 2019, he organized the first annual Princeton University Jazz Festival, which featured headliner Dave Holland along with other student and professional musicians.

== Musical influences ==
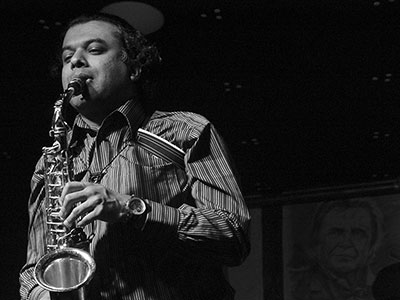
Rudresh Mahanthappa

During his time at Berklee, he was introduced to the music of Indian saxophonist Kadri Gopalnath, whose use of a Western instrument in carnatic music surprised and inspired Mahanthappa. He would later travel to India on a grant to work with Gopalnath; the two played together in concert between 2005 and 2008 and collaborated on the album Kinsmen (2008), which fuses Western and Indian approaches to improvisation.

In 2010, Mahanthappa recorded and released Apex with saxophonist Bunky Green. As Mahanthappa tells it, "I first heard about Bunky from the late great saxophone teacher Joe Viola when I was a student at Berklee in the early 90s. Joe heard me warming up once and recommended that I check Bunky out as he thought that my approach was on track to being something similar to his. He loaned me Bunky's record Places We've Never Been (Vanguard) which totally knocked me out!" Mahanthappa sought Green out and sent him a tape of his playing to which Green responded by providing some encouraging feedback, leading to a long friendship.

Mahanthappa traveled again to India for his Guggenheim Fellowship so that he could study and gain a better understanding of the formal elements of carnatic music. In a 2011 interview with Westword newspaper about the resulting album, Samdhi, Mahanthappa said, "my idea was to take whatever I learned—take that knowledge—and really put in a setting that has nothing to do with Indian classical music. Mahanthappa further claims The Brecker Brothers, The Yellowjackets, David Sanborn, Grover Washington, Jr., and Miles Davis' electric bands as influences in creating Samdhi.

== Groups ==
He leads or co-leads the Rudresh Mahanthappa Quartet (with Vijay Iyer or Craig Taborn on piano, François Moutin on bass, and Dan Weiss on drums), Raw Materials (with Vijay Iyer), Indo-Pak Coalition (with Rez Abbasi on sitar-guitar and Dan Weiss on tabla), MSG (with Ronan Guilfoyle on bass and Chander Sardjoe on drums), Dakshina Ensemble septet, and various groups playing under the label Dual Identity.

== Awards and honors ==
Since 2003, Mahanthappa has been listed frequently in the Critics' Poll of Down Beat magazine. He was named both "No. 1 Rising Star Jazz Artist" and "No. 1 Rising Star Alto Saxophonist" in the 2010 poll. In 2011, he was voted the No. 1 Alto Saxophonist of the Year by the 59th Annual Down Beat Critics' Poll.

He was given a grant by the New York Foundation for the Arts Fellow in Music (2006), three Rockefeller MAP grants, and two grants from the New York State Council on the Arts.

In 2007, he was named a Guggenheim fellow to pursue his interest in how carnatic music can inform and inspire American jazz.

The Jazz Journalists Association named Mahanthappa Alto Saxophonist of the Year in 2009, 2010, and 2011.

== Discography ==
=== As leader/co-leader ===
Year	Title	Artist	Label	Footnotes
1994	Yatra	Rudresh Mahanthappa	Red Giant	
2002	Black Water	Rudresh Mahanthappa	Red Giant	
2004	Mother Tongue	Rudresh Mahanthappa	Pi	
2006	Raw Materials	Vijay Iyer & Rudresh Mahanthappa	Savoy Jazz	
2006	Codebook	Rudresh Mahanthappa	Pi	
2006	The Beautiful Enabler	Mauger Trio (Rudresh Mahanthappa, Mark Dresser, Gerry Hemingway)	Clean Feed	
2008	Kinsmen	Rudresh Mahanthappa & Kadri Gopalnath: The Dakshina Ensemble	Pi	
2008	Apti	Rudresh Mahanthappa's Indo-Pak Coalition	Innova	
2010	Dual Identity	Rudresh Mahanthappa & Steve Lehman	Clean Feed	
2010	Apex	Rudresh Mahanthappa & Bunky Green	Pi	
2011	Tasty!	MSG: Rudresh Mahanthappa, Chander Sardjoe, Ronan Guilfoyle	Plus Loin	
2011	Samdhi	Rudresh Mahanthappa	ACT	
2013	Gamak	Rudresh Mahanthappa	ACT	
2015	Bird Calls	Rudresh Mahanthappa	ACT	

=== As sideman ===
Year	Title	Artist	Label	Footnotes
1992	Plays Music by Rich Latham	The Oversize Quartet	Accurate	
1994	Big Band Basie	Clark Terry with the DePaul University Big Band	Reference	
1998	Architextures	Vijay Iyer	Red Giant	
2001	Panoptic Modes	Vijay Iyer	Red Giant	
2003	Blood Sutra	Vijay Iyer	Pi	
2003	In What Language?	Vijay Iyer	Pi	
2005	Far Side of Here	Brooklyn Saxophone Quartet	Omnitone	
2005	Reimagining	Vijay Iyer	Savoy Jazz	
2006	Bazaar	Rez Abbasi	Zoho	
2007	The Chicago Sessions	Clark Terry with the DePaul University Big Band	Summit	
2007	Two Rivers	Amir ElSaffar	Pi	
2008	A Celebration of the Music of Miles Davis	Miles from India, produced by Bob Belden	Four Quarters	
2008	Real People	Anders Morgensen	Blackout	
2008	Tragicomic	Vijay Iyer	Sunnyside	
2009	Things to Come	Rez Abbasi	Sunnyside	
2010	The Two Faces of Janus	Jason Robinson	Cuneiform	
2010	Providencia	Danilo Pérez	Mack Avenue	
2011	Live at Yoshi's 2010	Jack DeJohnette	Golden Beams	
2011	Suno Suno	Rez Abbasi	Enja	
