= Tirtha (album) =

Studio album by Vijay Iyer with Prasanna and Nitin Mitta
- Released: February 25, 2011
- Recorded: August 11 & 12, 2008 at Systems Two in Brooklyn NY
- Genre: Jazz
- Length: 60:31
- Label: ACT Music ACT 9503
- Producer: Tirtha

Vijay Iyer chronology
Door (2007)	Tirtha (2011)	Accelerando (2012)

Tirtha is an album by pianist Vijay Iyer with Prasanna and Nitin Mitta recorded in 2008 and released on the ACT label in 2011.

== Reception ==
Professional ratings
Aggregate scores
Source	Rating
Metacritic	81/100
Review scores
Source	Rating
AllMusic	4/5 stars
All About Jazz	4.5/5 stars
The Guardian	4/5 stars
Los Angeles Times	3/4 stars
musicOMH	4/5 stars
Tom Hull	B+

The album received universal acclaim with Metacritic giving it a score of 81 from 8 reviews. Thom Jurek, in his review for AllMusic states, "Tirtha is a triumph; it is a high-water mark in hearing the constantly evolving discussion between jazz and Indian music". Writing for All About Jazz, Mark F. Turner said "the recording crosses the channels of jazz and Indian music, eschewing the hybridization of the two styles; a semblance of familiarity but also something entirely fresh. The nine tracks contain robust elements of ethnicity, thriving improvisation, and exhaustive composition; steeped in modern and old worlds". The Guardian review by John Fordham awarded the album 4 stars noting "Iyer and his partners sound like a spontaneous ensemble from the outset – not self-conscious participants in a fusion experiment".

== Track listing ==
All compositions by Vijay Iyer except as indicated

1. "Duality" - 5:59
2. "Tribal Wisdom" (Prasanna) - 11:06
3. "Tirtha" - 7:04
4. "Abundance" - 7:46
5. "Falsehood" (Prasanna) - 6:38
6. "Gauntlet" - 2:10
7. "Polytheism" (Prasanna) - 5:43
8. "Remembrance" - 6:09
9. "Entropy and Time" (Prasanna based on a composition by T.R. Subramanyam) - 7:58

== Personnel ==
- Vijay Iyer — piano
- Prasanna — guitar, voice
- Nitin Mitta — tabla
