= Steve Lehman (musician) =

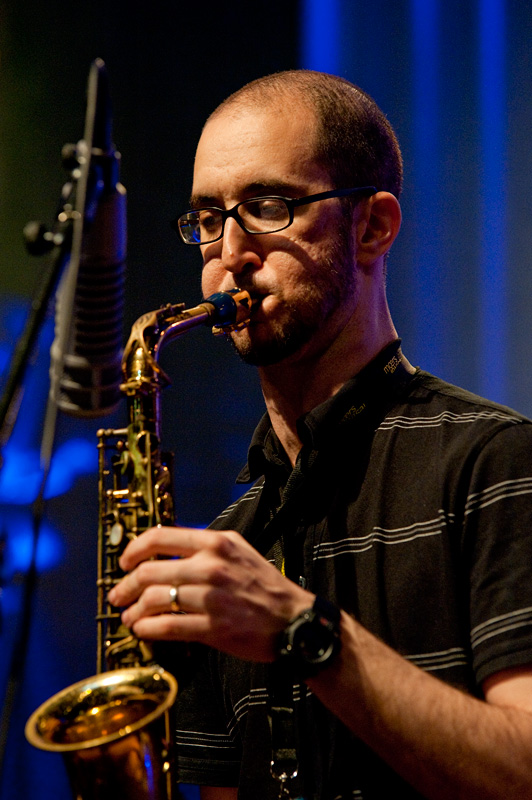

Background information
- Born: 1978 (age 46–47); New York City, New York, U.S.
- Genres: Jazz, experimental
- Occupation(s): Musician, composer
- Instrument: Saxophone
- Labels: Pi, Clean Feed
- Spouse: Olivia Newman
- Website: www.stevelehman.com

Steve Lehman (born 1978) is an American composer and saxophonist in the genres of jazz and experimental music. His compositions have been performed by a number of international performers and orchestras.

== Early life and education ==
Lehman was born in New York City. He earned a Bachelor of Arts and Master of Arts in composition from Wesleyan University and received his Doctor of Musical Arts with distinction in composition from Columbia University (under the direction of Tristan Murail, George E. Lewis, Fabien Lévy and Fred Lerdahl). He also attended classes with Jackie McLean for many years at the University of Hartford Hartt School.

== Career ==
As a performer, Lehman leads a number of his own ensembles and performs frequently as a sideman with artists like Anthony Braxton, Vijay Iyer, and Jason Moran. His recording Travail, Transformation & Flow (Pi Recordings 2009) was chosen as the #1 Jazz Album of the year by The New York Times. Lehman’s work has been reviewed in Artforum, Down Beat magazine, The New York Times, Newsweek, and The Wire, National Public Radio, and the BBC. Lehman was a Fulbright scholar from 2002–2003. Lehman is a professor of Music at the California Institute of the Arts in Valencia, California.

== Awards and honors ==
- Jazz Album of the Year, New York Times, 2009, Travail, Transformation & Flow
- Best New Album, NPR Music Jazz Critics Poll, 2014, Mise en Abime
- Guggenheim Fellowship 2015
- Doris Duke Artist Award 2014

== Discography ==
=== As leader ===
- Structural Fire (CIMP, 2001)
- Camoflage (CIMP, 2002)
- Interface (Clean Feed, 2004)
- Artificial Light (Fresh Sound, 2004)
- Demian as Posthuman (Pi, 2005)
- Manifold (Clean Feed, 2007)
- On Meaning (Pi, 2007)
- Travail, Transformation, and Flow (Pi, 2009)
- Dual Identity with Rudresh Mahanthappa (Clean Feed, 2010)
- Kaleidoscope & Collage with Stephan Crump (Intakt, 2011)
- Dialect Fluorescent (Pi, 2012)
- Mise en Abîme (Pi, 2014)
- Steve Lehman & Sélébéyone (Pi, 2016)
- The People I Love with Craig Taborn (Pi, 2019)
- Xenakis and the Valedictorian (Pi, 2020)
- Ex Machina with Orchestre National de Jazz (Pi, 2023)
- The Music of Anthony Braxton with Mark Turner (Pi, 2025)

=== As sideman ===
With Anthony Braxton

- Nine Compositions (Hill) 2000 (CIMP, 2001)
- 12+1tet (Victoriaville) 2007 (Victo, 2007)
- Sax Quintet (Middletown) 1998 Part I (New Braxton House, 2011)
- Sax Quintet (Middletown) 1998 Part II (New Braxton House, 2011)
- Tentet (Antwerp) 2000 Part I (New Braxton House, 2011)
- Tentet (Antwerp) 2000 Part II (New Braxton House, 2011)
- Tentet (Wesleyan) 2000 (Part I) (New Braxton House, 2011)
- Tentet (Wesleyan) 2000 (Part II) (New Braxton House, 2011)
- Tentet (Wesleyan) 1999 Part I (New Braxton House, 2012)
- Tentet (Wesleyan) 1999 Part II (New Braxton House, 2012)
- Alumni Orchestra (Wesleyan) 2005 (New Braxton House, 2012)
- Echo Echo Mirror House (NYC) 2011 (New Braxton House, 2012)
- Tentet (Paris) 2001 (New Braxton House, 2013)

With Liberty Ellman

- Ophiuchus Butterfly (Pi, 2006)
- Radiate (Pi, 2015)
- Last Desert (Pi, 2020)

With others

- Vijay Iyer, Far from Over (ECM, 2017)
- Jason Moran, All Rise: A Joyful Elegy for Fats Waller (Blue Note, 2014)
- Kevin Norton, Change Dance Troubled Energy (Barking Hoop, 2001)
- Matthew Welch, Ceol Nua (Leo, 2002)
