= Liberty Ellman =

- Born: July 17, 1971 (age 55); London, England
- Genre: Jazz
- Occupations: Musician, audio engineer, record producer
- Instrument: Guitar
- Label: Pi
- Website: libertyellman.com

Liberty Ellman (born July 17, 1971) is a jazz guitarist born in London and raised in the United States, beginning in New York City. In the early 1980s, Ellman's family moved to California. Before leaving New York, he attended City and Country School in Greenwich Village.

== Biography ==
In the 1990s, Ellman was associated with the M-Base musical scene in San Francisco, California, where he played with Vijay Iyer, Miya Masaoka, Ledisi, Steve Coleman, Eric Crystal, EW Wainwright's African Roots of Jazz, Omar Sosa, and D'Armous Boone Collective. He worked with hip hop acts the Coup and Midnight Voices, and performed opening spots for Devo, Ice Cube, Pharcyde, and the Stray Cats. During this time Ellman composed for the San Francisco Mime Troupe. He released his debut album on his label, Red Giant Records, in 1997 and moved back to New York City the following year.

Ellman has performed and recorded with Ben Goldberg, Okkyung Lee, Steve Lehman, Joe Lovano, Rudresh Mahanthappa, Barney McAll, Myra Melford, Butch Morris, Greg Osby, Matana Roberts, Josh Roseman, Michele Rosewoman, and Wadada Leo Smith. In 2014 he worked with Jason Moran as part of Luanda Kinshasa, a video installation by filmmaker Stan Douglas. In 2016 he was asked by John Zorn to perform a solo concert of a selection of Zorn's Bagatelles.

He is a member of Henry Threadgill's ensemble Zooid. Threadgill's album In for a Penny, In for a Pound won a Pulitzer Prize for Music. Ellman is credited as producer and mixing engineer on that album. He mixed and mastered Be Good by Gregory Porter. The album was nominated for Grammy Award.

In 2016, Ellman was voted No. 1 Rising Star guitarist in the DownBeat magazine Critics' Poll. The expanded Critics' Poll at JazzTimes magazine named him one of the top jazz guitarists of 2015 with Bill Frisell, John Scofield, and Julian Lage.

== Discography ==
=== As leader ===
- Orthodoxy (Red Giant, 1997)
- Tactiles (Pi, 2003)
- Ophiuchus Butterfly (Pi, 2006)
- Radiate (Pi, 2015)
- Last Desert (Pi, 2020)

=== As sideman ===
With Vijay Iyer

- Memorophilia (Asian Improv 1995)
- Architextures (Asian Improv 1998)
- In What Language? (Pi, 2003)
- Still Life with Commentator (Savoy, 2007)
- Holding It Down (Pi, 2013)

With Myra Melford

- Snowy Egret (Yellowbird, 2015)
- The Other Side of Air (Firehouse 12, 2018)
- 12 from 25 (Firehouse 12, 2018)

With Jason Robinson

- Resonant Geographies (pfMENTUM, 2018)
- The Two Faces of Janus (Cuneiform, 2010)
- Tiresian Symmetry (Cuneiform, 2012)

With Somi

- Live at Jazz Standard (Palmetto, 2011)
- The Lagos Music Salon (Okeh, 2014)
- Petite Afrique (Okeh, 2017)

With Henry Threadgill

- Up Popped the Two Lips (Pi, 2001)
- Pop Start the Tape, Stop (Hardedge, 2004)
- This Brings Us to Volume I (Pi, 2009)
- This Brings Us to Volume II (Pi, 2010)
- Tomorrow Sunny/the Revelry, Spp (Pi, 2012)
- In for a Penny, In for a Pound (Pi, 2015)
- Dirt...and More Dirt (Pi, 2018)

With others

- J. D. Allen, Radio Flyer (Savant, 2017)
- J. D. Allen, Love Stone (Savant, 2018)
- Jen Chapin, Light of Mine (Purple Chair Music, 2008)
- Groove Collective, People People Music Music (Savoy, 2005)
- Dealers of God, Dealer's Choice (Dismiss Yourself, 2023)
- Dealers of God, Dealer’s Choice: Director’s Cut (Dismiss Yourself, 2024)
- Chico Hamilton, 6th Avenue Romp (Joyous Shout!, 2006)
- Joel Harrison, The Music of Paul Motian (Sunnyside, 2010)
- J. C. Hopkins, Underneath a Brooklyn Moon (Tigerlily, 2005)
- Rudresh Mahanthappa & Steve Lehman, Dual Identity (Clean Feed, 2010)
- Masaoka Orchestra, What Is the Difference Between Stripping & Playing the Violin? (Victo, 1998)
- Barney McAll, Mother of Dreams and Secrets (Research, 2018)
- Josh Roseman, Treats for the Nightwalker (Enja, 2003)
- Adam Rudolph, Turning Towards the Light (Cuneiform, 2015)
- Samo Salamon, Dream Suites Vol. 1 (Samo Records, 2025)
