= List of 2014 albums =

The following is a list of albums, EPs, and mixtapes released in 2014. These albums are (1) original, i.e. excluding reissues, remasters, and compilations of previously released recordings, and (2) notable, defined as having received significant coverage from reliable sources independent of the subject.

For additional information about bands formed, reformed, disbanded, or on hiatus, for deaths of musicians, and for links to musical awards, see 2014 in music.

== First quarter ==
=== January ===
List of albums released in January 2014
Go to: January | February | March | April | May | June | July | August | September | October | November | December | Back to top
Release date	Artist	Album	Genre	Label	Ref.
January 1	Del the Funky Homosapien	Iller Than Most	Hip-hop		
January 2	Rain	Rain Effect	K-pop	Cube	
January 3	Legion of the Damned	Ravenous Plague	Death metal, thrash metal	Napalm	
January 3	Pixies	EP2	Alternative rock, indie rock		
January 6	Iced Earth	Plagues of Babylon	Heavy metal	Century Media	
January 6	Jan Gunnar Hoff	Fly North	Jazz	Losen	
January 6	TVXQ	Tense	K-pop, R&B, dance	S.M. Entertainment	
January 7	Kid Ink	My Own Lane	Hip-hop	RCA, Tha Alumni Music Group, 88 Classic	
January 7	Stephen Malkmus and the Jicks	Wig Out at Jagbags	Indie rock	Matador	
January 10	Arve Henriksen	Chron		Rune Grammofon	
January 10	James Vincent McMorrow	Post Tropical		Believe Recordings, Vagrant	
January 13	East India Youth	Total Strife Forever	Indietronica	Stolen	
January 14	Bruce Springsteen	High Hopes	Rock	Columbia	
January 14	The Crystal Method	The Crystal Method	Trip hop, electronica, breakbeat	Tiny e Records	
January 14	Mary Chapin Carpenter	Songs from the Movie	Country	Zoë, Decca, Rounder	
January 14	Number One Gun	This Is All We Know	Alternative rock, Christian rock	Tooth & Nail	
January 14	Rosanne Cash	The River & the Thread		Blue Note	
January 14	Sharon Jones & the Dap-Kings	Give the People What They Want	Soul, funk	Daptone	
January 14	Switchfoot	Fading West	Alternative rock, pop	lowercase people, Atlantic	
January 17	Alcest	Shelter	Post-rock, shoegaze, dream pop	Prophecy Productions	
January 17	Tord Gustavsen Quartet	Extended Circle	Jazz	ECM	
January 17	Warpaint	Warpaint	Indie rock, dream pop	Rough Trade	
January 20	Mogwai	Rave Tapes	Post-rock, electronic music	Rock Action	
January 20	Thee Silver Mt. Zion Memorial Orchestra	Fuck Off Get Free We Pour Light on Everything	Experimental rock	Constellation	
January 20	Sophie Ellis-Bextor	Wanderlust	Indie pop, folk	EBGB's	
January 21	Against Me!	Transgender Dysphoria Blues	Punk rock	Total Treble Music	
January 21	Hard Working Americans	Hard Working Americans	Rock	Thirty Tigers, Melvin Records	
January 21	Ice Nine Kills	The Predator Becomes the Prey	Metalcore, post-hardcore	Outerloop Records, Fearless	
January 21	Monte Pittman	The Power of Three		Metal Blade	
January 21	Step Brothers	Lord Steppington	Hip-hop	Rhymesayers	
January 21	Ty Dolla Sign	Beach House EP	Hip-hop, R&B	Atlantic, Taylor Gang, Pu$haz Ink	
January 21	Young the Giant	Mind over Matter	Alternative rock	Fueled by Ramen	
January 22	AKB48	Tsugi no Ashiato	J-pop	King	
January 22	Dum Dum Girls	Too True	Indie pop	Sub Pop	
January 22	Primal Fear	Delivering the Black	Power metal, heavy metal	Frontiers	
January 22	Within Temptation	Hydra	Symphonic metal, power metal, gothic metal	Nuclear Blast, Dramatico, BMG	
January 24	Of Mice & Men	Restoring Force	Metalcore, nu metal	Rise	
January 27	Actress	Ghettoville	Electronic, glitch, minimal techno	Werkdiscs, Ninja Tune	
January 27	Hildegunn Øiseth	Valencia	Jazz	Losen	
January 27	Moodymann	Moodymann	Detroit techno, house, psychedelic soul	KDJ	
January 27	Transatlantic	Kaleidoscope	Progressive rock	Inside Out, Radiant Records, Metal Blade	
January 27	You Me at Six	Cavalier Youth	Alternative rock, pop rock	BMG	
January 28	The Autumn Defense	Fifth	Indie rock	Yep Roc	
January 28	Casting Crowns	Thrive	Contemporary Christian, rock	Beach Street, Reunion	
January 28	Dave Barnes	Golden Days	Acoustic rock, pop, Southern rock	50 Year Plan Records	
January 28	David Crosby	Croz	Rock	Blue Castle Records	
January 28	Jamie Grace	Ready to Fly	CCM, Christian hip-hop, R&B	Gotee	
January 28	Laura Cantrell	No Way There from Here	Americana, country	Thrift Shop Recordings	
January 28	The Lawrence Arms	Metropole	Punk rock	Epitaph	
January 28	The New Mendicants	Into the Lime	Indie rock	XPT Records	
January 28	Quilt	Held in Splendor	Indie folk, psychedelic folk	Mexican Summer	
January 28	RuPaul	RuPaul Presents: The CoverGurlz	Dance	World of Wonder	
January 28	Shinedown	Acoustic Sessions		Atlantic	
January 29	Nina Persson	Animal Heart	Alternative rock, indie pop	Lojinx, The End	
January 30	MKTO	MKTO	Pop, teen pop, hip-hop	Columbia	
January 31	Broken Bells	After the Disco	Indie rock, space rock	Columbia	
January 31	Dolly Parton	Blue Smoke	Country	Dolly Records, Sony Masterworks	
January 31	Young Fathers	Dead	Alternative hip-hop, alternative R&B	Anticon, Big Dada	

=== February ===
List of albums released in February 2014
Go to: January | February | March | April | May | June | July | August | September | October | November | December | Back to top
Release date	Artist	Album	Genre	Label	Ref.
February 3	Augustines	Augustines	Indie rock	Votiv, Caroline International	
February 3	Behemoth	The Satanist	Blackened death metal	Nuclear Blast, Metal Blade, Mystic	
February 3	Bombay Bicycle Club	So Long, See You Tomorrow	Indie rock, indietronica, alternative dance	Island, Vagrant	
February 3	Maxïmo Park	Too Much Information	Indie rock	Vertigo, Daylighting	
February 3	Sunn O))) and Ulver	Terrestrials	Experimental metal, post-black metal	Southern Lord	
February 4	A. J. Croce	Twelve Tales			
February 4	For Today	Fight the Silence	Metalcore	Razor & Tie	
February 4	Gardens & Villa	Dunes	Indie rock	Secretly Canadian	
February 4	Marissa Nadler	July	Indie folk, dream pop	Bella Union, Sacred Bones	
February 4	Paul Rodgers	The Royal Sessions	Blues, soul	429, Pie Records	
February 4	Prince Po and Oh No	Animal Serum	Hip-hop	Wandering Worx, Green Streets Entertainment	
February 4	Toni Braxton & Babyface	Love, Marriage & Divorce	R&B, pop, soul	Motown	
February 4	Xiu Xiu	Angel Guts: Red Classroom	Art rock	Polyvinyl	
February 5	Temples	Sun Structures	Neo-psychedelia, psychedelic rock	Heavenly, Fat Possum	
February 7	John Butler Trio	Flesh & Blood	Folk	Jarrah, MGM	
February 7	Katy B	Little Red	Electronic, dance, R&B	Columbia, Sony Music	
February 7	Neil Finn	Dizzy Heights	Alternative rock	Lester Records	
February 10	Tinariwen	Emmaar	African blues, world	Anti-	
February 11	Crosses	Crosses	Electronic rock, dream pop, electronica	Sumerian	
February 11	Eric Church	The Outsiders	Country, country rock	EMI Nashville	
February 11	Frankie Ballard	Sunshine & Whiskey	Country	Warner Bros. Nashville	
February 11	The Glitch Mob	Love Death Immortality	Electronic, glitch	Glass Air	
February 11	Hurray for the Riff Raff	Small Town Heroes	Americana, folk, roots rock	ATO	
February 11	Kutless	Glory	Christian rock, contemporary worship music	BEC	
February 11	Modern Baseball	You're Gonna Miss It All	Emo, indie rock, folk rock	Run for Cover	
February 11	Sun Kil Moon	Benji	Folk rock	Caldo Verde	
February 12	BTS	Skool Luv Affair	K-pop	Big Hit	
February 12	Dead by April	Let the World Know	Metalcore, pop metal	Universal	
February 14	Benighted	Carnivore Sublime	Deathgrind	Season of Mist	
February 14	Cibo Matto	Hotel Valentine	Trip hop, indie pop, shibuya-kei	Chimera Music	
February 14	Cynic	Kindly Bent to Free Us	Progressive rock, progressive metal	Season of Mist	
February 14	I Killed the Prom Queen	Beloved	Metalcore	Epitaph	
February 14	JoJo	LoveJo	Gospel, R&B, pop	Atlantic	
February 14	Mýa	With Love	R&B, soul	Planet 9	
February 14	Nina Nesbitt	Peroxide	Folk pop	Island	
February 14	Planningtorock	All Love's Legal	Electronic pop, house, disco	Human Level	
February 14	The Presidents of the United States of America	Kudos to You!	Alternative rock	PUSA, Burnside	
February 14	Pwr Bttm and Jawbreaker Reunion	Republican National Convention			
February 17	Angel Olsen	Burn Your Fire for No Witness	Indie rock, alternative country, folk	Jagjaguwar	
February 17	Jesca Hoop	Undress	Acoustic	Last Laugh Records, Republic of Music	
February 18	Bear Hands	Distraction	Experimental rock, indie rock, post-punk	Cantora	
February 18	Candice Glover	Music Speaks	R&B, soul	19, Interscope	
February 18	Guided by Voices	Motivational Jumpsuit	Indie rock	Guided by Voices Inc.	
February 18	Issues	Issues	Metalcore, nu metal	Rise	
February 18	Juvenile	The Fundamentals	Hip-hop	UTP Records, Rap-A-Lot, RED	
February 18	Kevin Seconds	Off Stockton		Rise	
February 18	Lake Street Dive	Bad Self Portraits	Pop, blue-eyed soul	Signature Sounds	
February 18	Lydia Loveless	Somewhere Else		Bloodshot	
February 18	Phantogram	Voices	Electronica, trip hop, indie pop	Republic	
February 20	Lakutis	Three Seashells	Hip-hop	Greedhead Music	
February 20	Raimundos	Cantigas de Roda			
February 21	Beck	Morning Phase	Folk rock	Capitol	
February 21	Markus Schulz	Scream 2	Trance	Armada	
February 21	Papa vs Pretty	White Deer Park	Rock, indie rock, alternative rock	Peace & Riot, EMI	
February 22	Dorota Masłowska	Społeczeństwo jest niemiłe	Hip-hop, punk rock, dance		
February 24	Arthur Beatrice	Working Out			
February 24	Girls' Generation	Mr.Mr.	Electropop, R&B, pop	SM, KT Music, Universal	
February 24	RuPaul	Born Naked	Dance, electronic, bounce	RuCo Inc.	
February 24	Russian Red	Agent Cooper			
February 24	Skaters	Manhattan	Post-punk revival	Warner Bros.	
February 24	Wild Beasts	Present Tense	Indie rock	Domino	
February 25	Dierks Bentley	Riser	Country	Capitol Nashville	
February 25	The Fray	Helios	Pop rock	Epic	
February 25	Kid Cudi	Satellite Flight: The Journey to Mother Moon	Alternative hip-hop	Wicked Awesome, Republic	
February 25	Mike Gordon	Overstep	Rock	Megaplum, ATO	
February 25	Neneh Cherry	Blank Project	Electronic, trip hop, experimental	Smalltown Supersound	
February 25	The Notwist	Close to the Glass	Electronic, experimental, post-rock	City Slang, Sub Pop	
February 25	Schoolboy Q	Oxymoron	West Coast hip-hop, gangsta rap	Top Dawg, Interscope	
February 25	St. Vincent	St. Vincent	Art rock, noise pop, pop rock	Loma Vista, Republic	
February 26	Babymetal	Babymetal	Kawaii metal	BMD Fox, Toy's Factory, Amuse	
February 27	2NE1	Crush	K-pop, hip-hop, R&B	YG	
February 28	Lea Michele	Louder	Pop, EDM, power pop	Columbia	

=== March ===
List of albums released in March 2014
Go to: January | February | March | April | May | June | July | August | September | October | November | December | Back to top
Release date	Artist	Album	Genre	Label	Ref.
March 1	Calle 13	Multi_Viral	Latin, alternative hip-hop, urban	El Abismo	
March 3	American Authors	Oh, What a Life	Indie rock, alternative rock	Mercury	
March 3	Bigelf	Into the Maelstrom	Progressive rock, psychedelic rock	Inside Out	
March 3	Blood Red Shoes	Blood Red Shoes	Alternative rock, stoner rock	Jazz Life	
March 3	Eagulls	Eagulls		Partisan	
March 3	Laibach	Spectre	Martial industrial, neoclassical dark wave, electro-industrial	Mute	
March 3	Mike Oldfield	Man on the Rocks	Rock	Virgin EMI	
March 3	Pharrell Williams	Girl	R&B, funk	Columbia	
March 3	Rick Ross	Mastermind	Hip-hop	Maybach, Slip-n-Slide, Def Jam	
March 4	Ashanti	Braveheart	R&B	Written, eOne	
March 4	Carnifex	Die Without Hope	Deathcore, symphonic black metal	Nuclear Blast	
March 4	Comeback Kid	Die Knowing	Hardcore punk	Victory	
March 4	David Nail	I'm a Fire	Country	MCA Nashville	
March 4	Destrage	Are You Kidding Me? No.	Progressive metalcore	Metal Blade	
March 4	Drive-By Truckers	English Oceans	Southern rock	ATO	
March 4	Eli Young Band	10,000 Towns	Country	Republic Nashville	
March 4	Fuel	Puppet Strings	Hard rock	Megaforce	
March 4	The Men	Tomorrow's Hits	Indie rock, punk rock	Sacred Bones	
March 4	Nothing	Guilty of Everything		Relapse	
March 4	The Overseer	Rest and Let Go	Christian rock, experimental rock, screamo	Solid State	
March 4	Real Estate	Atlas	Indie rock, jangle pop, dream pop	Domino	
March 4	Vijay Iyer	Mutations	Jazz	ECM	
March 7	JTR	Touchdown	Pop	Sony Music, MGM	
March 7	King Gizzard & the Lizard Wizard	Oddments	Psychedelic rock, psychedelic pop, folk rock	Flightless	
March 7	MØ	No Mythologies to Follow	Electropop, synth-pop	Chess Club, RCA Victor	
March 7	Motorpsycho	Behind the Sun		Stickman Records, Rune Grammofon	
March 10	Charlotte Church	Four	Indie pop, alternative rock, math rock	Alligator Wine	
March 10	Dan Croll	Sweet Disarray	Indie rock, pop rock	Deram	
March 10	Elbow	The Take Off and Landing of Everything	Alternative rock, indie rock	Fiction	
March 10	Metronomy	Love Letters	Indietronica, indie pop, synth-pop	Because	
March 10	Paloma Faith	A Perfect Contradiction	Pop, R&B	RCA, Epic	
March 11	311	Stereolithic	Alternative rock, reggae rock, rap rock	311 Records	
March 11	Architects	Lost Forever // Lost Together	Metalcore	Epitaph, UNFD, New Damage	
March 11	Juanes	Loco de Amor		Universal Music Latino	
March 11	Le1f	Hey	Hip-hop	Terrible	
March 11	Ledisi	The Truth	R&B, pop	Verve	
March 11	Peter Furler Band	Sun and Shield	Christian rock, Contemporary Christian	New Day Records, Platinum Pop Records	
March 11	Young Money Entertainment	Young Money: Rise of an Empire	Hip-hop	Young Money, Cash Money, Republic	
March 12	The Pretty Reckless	Going to Hell	Hard rock	Razor & Tie	
March 14	The Audreys	'Til My Tears Roll Away		ABC Music	
March 14	Enrique Iglesias	Sex and Love	Latin pop, electropop	Republic	
March 14	Foster the People	Supermodel	Alternative rock, indie pop, neo-psychedelia	Columbia	
March 14	George Michael	Symphonica	Pop	Aegean, Virgin EMI	
March 14	Kate Miller-Heidke	O Vertigo!	Pop, rock	Cooking Vinyl	
March 14	Kylie Minogue	Kiss Me Once	Pop, dance-pop	Parlophone	
March 14	Skrillex	Recess	EDM	Big Beat, Owsla, Atlantic	
March 17	Black Lips	Underneath the Rainbow	Indie rock, garage rock, blues rock	Vice	
March 18	The Coathangers	Suck My Shirt	Punk rock, garage rock	Suicide Squeeze	
March 18	Demon Hunter	Extremist	Metalcore	Solid State	
March 18	La Dispute	Rooms of the House	Post-hardcore, progressive rock, spoken word	Better Living, Big Scary Monsters	
March 18	Freddie Gibbs & Madlib	Piñata	Hip-hop	Madlib Invazion	
March 18	I Am the Avalanche	Wolverines	Rock	I Surrender Records	
March 18	Jo Dee Messina	Me	Country	Dreambound Records	
March 18	Kevin Drew	Darlings	Indie rock	Arts & Crafts	
March 18	Onyx	Wakedafucup	East Coast hip-hop, hardcore hip-hop	Goon MuSick	
March 18	Perfect Pussy	Save Yes to Love	Punk rock, noise rock	Captured Tracks	
March 18	Sisyphus	Sisyphus	Hip-hop, electronic	Asthmatic Kitty	
March 18	Taking Back Sunday	Happiness Is	Alternative rock, pop rock	Hopeless	
March 18	Tycho	Awake	Ambient, post-rock	Ghostly International	
March 18	The War on Drugs	Lost in the Dream	Indie rock	Secretly Canadian	
March 18	YG	My Krazy Life	West Coast hip-hop	Pushaz Ink, CTE World, Def Jam	
March 20	Kool A.D.	Word O.K.	Hip-hop, alternative hip-hop		
March 21	Asia	Gravitas	Progressive rock	Frontiers	
March 21	Lali	A Bailar		Lali Espósito, Sony Music	
March 21	Shakira	Shakira	Pop	RCA, Sony Latin	
March 23	Wolfmother	New Crown	Hard rock, blues rock	Wolfmother	
March 24	Animals as Leaders	The Joy of Motion	Progressive metal, djent	Sumerian	
March 24	Combichrist	We Love You	Aggrotech	Metropolis	
March 24	Future Islands	Singles	Synth-pop	4AD	
March 24	Jimi Goodwin	Odludek	Rock	Heavenly	
March 24	Liars	Mess	Alternative dance, dance-punk, electronica	Mute	
March 24	MBLAQ	Broken	K-pop	J. Tune Camp	
March 24	Michael W. Smith	Hymns	CCM, worship	Provident	
March 24	Pixies	EP3	Indie rock, alternative rock		
March 24	Tokyo Police Club	Forcefield	Indie rock, indie pop, post-punk revival	Mom + Pop, Memphis Industries, Dine Alone	
March 25	The Bad Plus	The Rite of Spring	Jazz	Sony Masterworks	
March 25	The Baseball Project	3rd	Indie rock	Yep Roc	
March 25	Chuck Ragan	Till Midnight	Folk rock, indie folk	SideOneDummy	
March 25	Grieves	Winter & the Wolves	Hip-hop	Rhymesayers Entertainment	
March 25	The Hold Steady	Teeth Dreams	Indie rock	Razor & Tie	
March 25	Jerrod Niemann	High Noon	Country	Sea Gayle, Arista Nashville	
March 25	Johnny Cash	Out Among the Stars	Country	Columbia, Legacy	
March 25	Karmin	Pulses	Pop	Epic	
March 25	Memphis May Fire	Unconditional	Metalcore	Rise	
March 25	Thievery Corporation	Saudade	Bossa nova, Latin jazz, lounge	ESL Music	
March 25	Various artists	Bob Dylan in the 80s: Volume One	Alternative rock	ATO	
March 25	Wilko Johnson and Roger Daltrey	Going Back Home	Rhythm and blues, blues rock, hard rock	Chess	
March 26	Atari Teenage Riot	Reset	Digital hardcore, noise, electronic	Beat Records, Digital Hardcore	
March 26	Elena Paparizou	One Life	Pop	Lionheart	
March 26	Sebastian Bach	Give 'Em Hell	Heavy metal, hard rock, progressive metal	Frontiers	
March 26	Weaves	Weaves	Indie pop	Buzz	
March 28	Architecture in Helsinki	Now + 4eva	Indie pop	Casual Workout	
March 28	Stian Westerhus & Pale Horses	Maelstrom		Rune Grammofon	
March 31	Ai Aso	Lone	Folk	Ideologic Organ	
March 31	Band of Skulls	Himalayan	Hard rock, blues rock	Electric Blues Records	
March 31	Haywyre	Two Fold Pt. 1	Glitch hop, drumstep, UK garage	Monstercat	
March 31	Kaiser Chiefs	Education, Education, Education & War	Britpop	Fiction, B-Unique, ATO	
March 31	Lacuna Coil	Broken Crown Halo	Gothic metal, alternative metal	Century Media	
March 31	Robert Cray	In My Soul	Blues, soul	Provogue	
March 31	Timber Timbre	Hot Dreams	Folk, country blues	Arts & Crafts	

== Second quarter ==
=== April ===
List of albums released in April 2014
Go to: January | February | March | April | May | June | July | August | September | October | November | December | Back to top
Release date	Artist	Album	Genre	Label	Ref.
April 1	Chevelle	La Gárgola	Alternative metal, hard rock	Epic	
April 1	Chiodos	Devil	Post-hardcore	Razor & Tie	
April 1	Christina Perri	Head or Heart	Pop	Atlantic	
April 1	Cloud Nothings	Here and Nowhere Else	Indie rock	Carpark, Wichita	
April 1	Dan + Shay	Where It All Began	Country pop	Warner Bros. Nashville	
April 1	Fairweather	Fairweather		Equal Vision	
April 1	Mac DeMarco	Salad Days	Psychedelic pop	Captured Tracks	
April 1	Manchester Orchestra	Cope	Indie rock	Loma Vista, Favorite Gentlemen	
April 1	Mobb Deep	The Infamous Mobb Deep	Hip-hop, East Coast hip-hop	Infamous Records, RED	
April 1	Steel Panther	All You Can Eat	Glam metal, heavy metal, comedy rock	Open E Music	
April 1	The Used	Imaginary Enemy	Alternative rock, post-hardcore	GAS Union, Hopeless	
April 4	The Black Sorrows	Certified Blue	Rock, soul, blues	Head Records	
April 4	Delain	The Human Contradiction	Symphonic metal	Napalm	
April 4	For the Fallen Dreams	Heavy Hearts	Metalcore	Rise	
April 7	Black Label Society	Catacombs of the Black Vatican	Heavy metal	Mascot, eOne	
April 7	EMA	The Future's Void	Rock, folk-noise	City Slang, Matador	
April 7	LostAlone	Shapes of Screams	Rock	Graphite Records	
April 8	Girl Talk and Freeway	Broken Ankles	Mashup, hip-hop, electronic	Girl Talk Music	
April 8	James Durbin	Celebrate	Pop rock	Wind-up	
April 8	John Frusciante	Enclosure	Synth-pop, electronica, experimental rock	Record Collection	
April 8	Joan Osborne	Love and Hate		eOne	
April 8	Off!	Wasted Years	Hardcore punk	Vice	
April 8	Protomartyr	Under Color of Official Right	Post-punk, noise rock	Hardly Art	
April 8	Teebs	Estara	Instrumental hip-hop, ambient	Brainfeeder	
April 8	Todd Terje	It's Album Time	Nu-disco, space disco	Olsen Records	
April 9	Aldous Harding	Aldous Harding	Folk	Lyttelton Records	
April 11	Chet Faker	Built on Glass	Electronic, R&B, soul	Future Classic, Opulent	
April 11	The Vamps	Meet the Vamps	Pop, pop rock	Mercury, Virgin EMI	
April 14	Ben Watt	Hendra	Acoustic, downtempo	Unmade Road	
April 14	The Hoosiers	The News from Nowhere	Indie pop	Crab Race Ltd.	
April 14	Paolo Nutini	Caustic Love	Soul, R&B	Atlantic	
April 15	The Afghan Whigs	Do to the Beast		Sub Pop	
April 15	Anubis Gate	Horizons			
April 15	Bobby Rush with Blinddog Smokin'	Decisions			
April 15	Breathe Carolina	Savages	Electropop, emo pop	Fearless	
April 15	Emmure	Eternal Enemies	Nu metal	Victory	
April 15	Hawthorne Heights	The Silence in Black and White Acoustic		InVogue	
April 15	Ingrid Michaelson	Lights Out	Indie pop	Cabin 24	
April 15	Jason Derulo	Talk Dirty	Pop, R&B	Warner Bros., Beluga Heights	
April 15	Medeski Martin & Wood and Nels Cline	Woodstock Sessions Vol. 2	Jazz	Woodstock Sessions	
April 15	Needtobreathe	Rivers in the Wasteland		Atlantic, Word, Curb	
April 15	Pharoahe Monch	PTSD	Hip-hop	W.A.R. Media, INgrooves	
April 15	Sevendust	Time Travelers & Bonfires	Acoustic rock	Asylum, 7Bros. Records	
April 15	Temperance	Temperance	Power metal, symphonic metal	Scarlet	
April 15	Triptykon	Melana Chasmata	Extreme metal	Prowling Death, Century Media	
April 15	Woods	With Light and with Love	Indie folk, alternative rock	Woodsist	
April 18	Kelis	Food	R&B, soul	Ninja Tune	
April 18	Stream of Passion	A War of Our Own	Progressive metal, symphonic metal, gothic metal	PIAS, Rough Trade	
April 19	Green Day	Demolicious	Punk rock	Reprise	
April 19	Neil Young	A Letter Home	Folk rock, lo-fi	Third Man	
April 19	Pixies	Indie Cindy	Alternative rock	Pixiesmusic, PIAS	
April 21	Eels	The Cautionary Tales of Mark Oliver Everett	Indie rock	E Works	
April 21	Iggy Azalea	The New Classic	Hip-hop	Def Jam, Virgin EMI	
April 21	Keram	Come to Life		Constant Change Music	
April 21	Mýa	Sweet XVI	R&B, soul	Planet 9	
April 22	Asher Roth	RetroHash	Progressive hip-hop	Federal Prism, Pale Fire	
April 22	Drake Bell	Ready Steady Go!	Rockabilly, rock and roll, pop	Surfdog	
April 22	Francesca Battistelli	If We're Honest	CCM	Word, Fervent	
April 22	Future	Honest	Hip-hop	A1, Freebandz, Epic	
April 22	Justin Rutledge	Daredevil	Alternative country	Outside Music	
April 22	Keb' Mo'	BLUESAmericana	Blues	Kind of Blue Music	
April 22	Neon Trees	Pop Psychology	New wave	Mercury, Def Jam	
April 22	Rachele Lynae	Rachele Lynae	Country	Momentum Label Group	
April 22	Teen	The Way and Color		Carpark	
April 23	Prong	Ruining Lives	Groove metal, thrash metal	SPV/Steamhammer	
April 23	Winger	Better Days Comin'	Hard rock, progressive metal	Frontiers	
April 25	Damon Albarn	Everyday Robots	Art pop, trip hop, folktronica	Parlophone, Warner Bros.	
April 25	Embrace	Embrace	Alternative rock	Cooking Vinyl	
April 25	Insomnium	Shadows of the Dying Sun	Melodic death metal	Century Media	
April 25	Miss May I	Rise of the Lion	Metalcore	Rise	
April 27	Neil Cicierega	Mouth Sounds	Mashup		
April 28	Brody Dalle	Diploid Love	Punk rock, alternative rock	Caroline, Queen of Hearts	
April 29	Chris Robinson Brotherhood	Phosphorescent Harvest	Blues rock	Silver Arrow Records	
April 29	Eli "Paperboy" Reed	Nights Like This			
April 29	Framing Hanley	The Sum of Who We Are		Imagen Records	
April 29	The Ghost of a Saber Tooth Tiger	Midnight Sun		Chimera Music	
April 29	Lindsey Stirling	Shatter Me	Classical crossover, EDM	Decca, Universal Music	
April 29	The Nels Cline Singers	Macroscope	Rock, jazz	Mack Avenue	
April 29	Pink Mountaintops	Get Back	Alternative rock, indie rock	Jagjaguwar	
April 29	Ray LaMontagne	Supernova	Folk rock	RCA	
April 29	Thee Silver Mt. Zion Memorial Orchestra	Hang On to Each Other	EDM	Constellation	
April 29	Whitechapel	Our Endless War	Deathcore	Metal Blade	
April 29	Wye Oak	Shriek	Indie rock	Merge	

=== May ===
List of albums released in May 2014
Go to: January | February | March | April | May | June | July | August | September | October | November | December | Back to top
Release date	Artist	Album	Genre	Label	Ref.
May 1	Buzzcocks	The Way	Pop-punk		
May 2	Anastacia	Resurrection		Sanctuary, BMG	
May 2	Epica	The Quantum Enigma	Symphonic metal	Nuclear Blast	
May 2	Lily Allen	Sheezus	Electropop	Regal, Parlophone	
May 2	Lykke Li	I Never Learn	Indie pop, dream pop	LL, Atlantic	
May 2	Xandria	Sacrificium	Symphonic metal	Napalm	
May 5	Brian Eno and Karl Hyde	Someday World	Electronic	Warp	
May 5	The Horrors	Luminous	Neo-psychedelia, dream pop	XL	
May 5	Tune-Yards	Nikki Nack	Art pop	4AD	
May 6	Andrew Jackson Jihad	Christmas Island	Indie rock, folk punk, indie folk	SideOneDummy	
May 6	Antwon	Heavy Hearted in Doldrums	Hip-hop	UNIF, Nature World	
May 6	Atmosphere	Southsiders	Hip-hop	Rhymesayers	
May 6	BadBadNotGood	III	Jazz	Innovative Leisure, Pirates Blend	
May 6	Ben & Ellen Harper	Childhood Home	Blues rock, folk rock, Americana	Prestige Folklore	
May 6	Curtis Harding	Soul Power	Soul, blues, R&B	Burger	
May 6	Natalie Merchant	Natalie Merchant	Soft rock, folk-pop	Nonesuch	
May 6	Santana	Corazón	Latin rock	RCA, Sony Latin Iberia	
May 6	Sarah McLachlan	Shine On	Pop rock	Verve	
May 6	Tech N9ne	Strangeulation	Hip-hop	Strange Music	
May 9	Killer Be Killed	Killer Be Killed	Groove metal, thrash metal	Nuclear Blast	
May 9	Little Dragon	Nabuma Rubberband	Trip hop, soul, pop	Because	
May 9	Michael Jackson	Xscape	Pop, R&B	MJJ, Epic	
May 9	Tori Amos	Unrepentant Geraldines	Alternative rock, pop rock	Mercury Classics	
May 11	Mac Miller	Faces	Experimental hip-hop	REMember Music, Warner	
May 12	The Black Keys	Turn Blue	Garage rock, blues rock, psychedelic rock	Nonesuch	
May 12	Blondie	Blondie 4(0) Ever		Noble ID	
May 12	Cakes da Killa	I Run This Club (Remixes)		HMUSA Records	
May 12	Chromeo	White Women	Electro-funk	Last Gang	
May 12	Foxes	Glorious	Synth-pop	RCA, Sign of the Times	
May 12	Hollie Cook	Twice	Reggae	Mr Bongo	
May 12	Swans	To Be Kind	Noise rock, drone, experimental	Young God	
May 12	Sylvan Esso	Sylvan Esso	Electronic, indie pop	Partisan	
May 12	Titãs	Nheengatu	Rock, punk rock	Som Livre	
May 13	Agalloch	The Serpent & the Sphere	Black metal, doom metal, folk metal	Profound Lore	
May 13	Amen Dunes	Love		Sacred Bones	
May 13	Down	Down IV – Part II	Sludge metal, stoner metal, Southern metal	Down Records, Independent Label Group	
May 13	Guided by Voices	Cool Planet	Indie rock	Guided by Voices Inc., Fire	
May 13	Kishi Bashi	Lighght	Indie pop, psychedelic pop	Joyful Noise	
May 13	Mad Caddies	Dirty Rice	Ska	Fat Wreck Chords	
May 13	Michael W. Smith	Sovereign	CCM, worship	Capitol, Sparrow	
May 13	Mushroomhead	The Righteous & the Butterfly	Alternative metal, industrial metal, experimental metal	Megaforce	
May 13	Only Crime	Pursuance	Melodic hardcore	Rise	
May 13	The Pains of Being Pure at Heart	Days of Abandon	Indie pop	Yebo	
May 13	Rascal Flatts	Rewind	Country	Big Machine	
May 13	Sturgill Simpson	Metamodern Sounds in Country Music	Outlaw country	High Top Mountain, Loose Music	
May 13	Tobacco	Ultima II Massage	Electronic	Ghostly International	
May 13	Vince Staples	Shyne Coldchain II	Hip-hop	Blacksmith	
May 14	Casualties of Cool	Casualties of Cool	Country rock, blues rock, ambient	HevyDevy Records	
May 16	Afrojack	Forget the World	Electro house, progressive house, hip house	Universal, Def Jam, Island	
May 16	Phillip Phillips	Behind the Light	Pop rock	Interscope, 19	
May 19	Blu	Good to Be Home	Alternative hip-hop	New World Color, Nature Sounds	
May 19	Brantley Gilbert	Just as I Am	Country, rock	Valory Music	
May 19	The Brian Jonestown Massacre	Revelation	Neo-psychedelia	A Records	
May 19	Cherry Ghost	Herd Runners	Indie rock, chamber pop	Heavenly	
May 19	Coldplay	Ghost Stories	Electronica, synth-pop	Parlophone, Atlantic	
May 19	Conor Oberst	Upside Down Mountain	Indie rock, folk rock	Nonesuch	
May 19	Melanie Martinez	Dollhouse		Atlantic, Warner Chappell	
May 19	Miss Fortune	A Spark to Believe		Sumerian	
May 19	Plaid	Reachy Prints	Electronic music, IDM	Warp	
May 19	The Roots	...And Then You Shoot Your Cousin	Alternative hip-hop	Def Jam	
May 19	Sleaford Mods	Divide and Exit		Harbinger Sound	
May 19	Various artists	The Fault in Our Stars		Atlantic	
May 20	Jolie Holland	Wine Dark Sea		Anti-	
May 23	Austin Mahone	The Secret	Pop, EDM	Chase, Cash Money, Republic	
May 23	Freeman	Freeman	Alternative rock, indie rock, pop rock	Partisan	
May 23	Mariah Carey	Me. I Am Mariah... The Elusive Chanteuse	R&B	Def Jam	
May 23	Röyksopp and Robyn	Do It Again	Electronic	Dog Triumph	
May 26	Bury Tomorrow	Runes	Metalcore	Nuclear Blast	
May 26	Hercules and Love Affair	The Feast of the Broken Heart	House	Moshi Moshi	
May 26	Sam Smith	In the Lonely Hour	Pop, soul	Capitol, Method	
May 26	Wolf Alice	Creature Songs	Grunge, folk	Dirty Hit	
May 27	7Seconds	Leave a Light On		Rise	
May 27	Cher Lloyd	Sorry I'm Late	Pop	Epic, Syco, Mr. Kanani	
May 27	Jamie Lynn Spears	The Journey	Country pop	Sweet Jamie Music	
May 27	Jamie O'Neal	Eternal	Country	Shanachie	
May 27	Owen Pallett	In Conflict	Indie rock	Domino, Secret City	
May 27	Powerman 5000	Builders of the Future	Electronic rock, industrial rock	T-Boy Records	
May 27	The Ready Set	The Bad & the Better	Electropop, pop	Razor & Tie	
May 27	Sharon Van Etten	Are We There	Indie rock, folk rock, soul	Jagjaguwar	
May 27	Tanya Tagaq	Animism	Inuit throat singing	Six Shooter	
May 30	Clean Bandit	New Eyes	House, classical crossover, baroque pop	Warner, Atlantic	
May 30	Sleep Party People	Floating	Dream pop, shoegaze, alternative rock	Blood and Biscuits	

=== June ===
List of albums released in June 2014
Go to: January | February | March | April | May | June | July | August | September | October | November | December | Back to top
Release date	Artist	Album	Genre	Label	Ref.
June 2	Christine and the Queens	Chaleur humaine		Because, Neon Gold	
June 2	Godflesh	Decline & Fall	Industrial metal, post-punk	Avalanche	
June 2	Howling Bells	Heartstrings	Indie rock	Birthday Records	
June 2	Kyla La Grange	Cut Your Teeth	Indie, electronica, synth-pop	Epic	
June 2	LP	Forever for Now	Pop	Warner Bros.	
June 2	Paws	Youth Culture Forever		FatCat	
June 3	50 Cent	Animal Ambition: An Untamed Desire To Win	Hip-hop	G-Unit, Caroline, Capitol	
June 3	Andrew Bird	Things Are Really Great Here, Sort Of...	Indie folk	Wegawam Music Co.	
June 3	Bob Mould	Beauty & Ruin	Alternative rock	Merge	
June 3	Die Antwoord	Donker Mag		Zef Records	
June 3	Echo & the Bunnymen	Meteorites	Alternative rock, neo-psychedelia	429	
June 3	Fucked Up	Glass Boys	Hardcore punk, punk rock, indie rock	Matador	
June 3	Hamilton Leithauser	Black Hours		Ribbon Music	
June 3	Lucy Hale	Road Between	Country pop	Hollywood	
June 3	Matisyahu	Akeda	Reggae, hip-hop		
June 3	Miranda Lambert	Platinum	Country	RCA Nashville	
June 3	Nazareth	Rock 'n' Roll Telephone	Hard rock	Union Square Music	
June 3	The Orwells	Disgraceland	Garage rock, indie rock	Atlantic	
June 3	Parquet Courts	Sunbathing Animal	Garage rock, post-punk	What's Your Rupture?, Rough Trade	
June 3	Priests	Bodies and Control and Money and Power	Punk rock, post-punk	Don Giovanni, Sister Polygon	
June 3	Sage Francis	Copper Gone	Hip-hop	Strange Famous	
June 4	Arch Enemy	War Eternal	Melodic death metal	Century Media	
June 4	Buck-Tick	Arui wa Anarchy		Lingua Sounda	
June 5	TV Girl	French Exit	Indie pop		
June 6	The Amity Affliction	Let the Ocean Take Me	Post-hardcore, metalcore	Roadrunner	
June 6	First Aid Kit	Stay Gold	Indie folk	Columbia	
June 6	Kasabian	48:13	Electronic rock, electronica	Columbia	
June 6	Passenger	Whispers		Nettwerk, Black Crow UK	
June 6	Rival Sons	Great Western Valkyrie	Blues rock, hard rock	Earache	
June 6	Tesla	Simplicity	Hard rock	Tesla Electric Company Recording, Frontiers	
June 9	Glass Animals	Zaba	Psychedelic pop, indie rock, indie pop	Wolf Tone, Caroline	
June 9	Tom Vek	Luck		Moshi Moshi	
June 10	Beartooth	Disgusting	Metalcore, hardcore punk	Red Bull, UNFD	
June 10	Chrissie Hynde	Stockholm	Power pop	Caroline, Will Travel	
June 10	Clipping	CLPPNG	Underground hip-hop, experimental hip-hop, musique concrète	Sub Pop	
June 10	Jack White	Lazaretto	Blues rock, country rock	Third Man, Columbia	
June 10	The Knife	Shaken-Up Versions		Brille, Rabid, Mute	
June 10	¡MursDay!	¡MursDay!	Hip-hop	Strange	
June 10	O.A.R.	The Rockville LP		Vanguard	
June 10	Open Mike Eagle	Dark Comedy	Hip-hop	MMG	
June 10	Popcaan	Where We Come From	Dancehall, pop	Mixpak	
June 10	Say Anything	Hebrews		Equal Vision	
June 10	Umphrey's McGee	Similar Skin	Progressive rock	Nothing Too Fancy Music	
June 10	The Word Alive	Real	Metalcore	Fearless	
June 13	Jennifer Lopez	A.K.A.	EDM, R&B, pop	Capitol	
June 13	Lana Del Rey	Ultraviolence	Desert rock, dream pop, psychedelic rock	Polydor, Interscope	
June 13	Linkin Park	The Hunting Party	Alternative metal, hard rock, rap rock	Warner Bros., Machine Shop	
June 13	Tiësto	A Town Called Paradise	EDM, progressive house, electro house	PM:AM	
June 16	Klaxons	Love Frequency	Indietronica, electronica, dance-pop	Red Records	
June 16	Venetian Snares	My Love Is a Bulldozer	Breakcore, modern classical	Planet Mu	
June 17	Alex G	DSU	Indie rock	Orchid Tapes	
June 17	The Antlers	Familiars	Indie rock, art rock, dream pop	Anti-, Transgressive	
June 17	Big Freedia	Just Be Free	Bounce	Queen Diva	
June 17	David Gray	Mutineers	Folk rock	Good Soldier Songs	
June 17	Deadmau5	while(1<2)		Mau5trap, Astralwerks, Capitol	
June 17	Joshua Redman	Trios Live	Post-bop	Nonesuch	
June 17	Pat Mastelotto & Tobias Ralph	ToPaRaMa		7d Media Records	
June 17	Radio Moscow	Magical Dirt	Psychedelic rock	Alive Naturalsound	
June 17	White Lung	Deep Fantasy	Punk rock	Domino	
June 17	Willie Nelson	Band of Brothers	Country	Legacy	
June 18	Cakes da Killa	Hunger Pangs			
June 19	Creeper	Creeper	Horror punk, punk rock	Palm Reader Records, Roadrunner	
June 20	Ed Sheeran	x		Asylum, Atlantic	
June 20	Paul Oakenfold	Trance Mission	Trance, breakbeat	Perfecto, Armada	
June 23	Buraka Som Sistema	Buraka			
June 23	For All Those Sleeping	Incomplete Me	Metalcore	Fearless	
June 23	G-Eazy	These Things Happen	Hip-hop	RCA, BPG, RVG	
June 23	Jason Lancaster	As You Are	Alternative rock, pop rock	Outerloop	
June 24	Ab-Soul	These Days...	Hip-hop	Top Dawg	
June 24	Alias	Pitch Black Prism	Instrumental hip-hop	Anticon	
June 24	Buckshot and P-Money	Backpack Travels	Hip-hop	Dawn Raid, Dirty, Duck Down	
June 24	Kitten	Kitten	Alternative rock, synth-pop, new wave	Elektra	
June 24	Mastodon	Once More 'Round the Sun	Progressive metal	Reprise	
June 24	The Never Ending	One	Indie rock, folk	Ryan River Studio	
June 24	Nothing More	Nothing More	Alternative metal, hard rock, progressive metal	Eleven Seven	
June 24	Phish	Fuego	Rock	JEMP	
June 24	Riff Raff	Neon Icon	Hip-hop	Mad Decent	
June 24	Slaves	Through Art We Are All Equals	Post-hardcore, experimental rock	Artery	
June 24	Sons of Magdalene	Move to Pain		Audraglint Recordings	
June 24	A Sunny Day in Glasgow	Sea When Absent	shoegaze	Lefse Records	
June 24	Total Control	Typical System	Post-punk, new wave, indie rock	Iron Lung Records	
June 27	5 Seconds of Summer	5 Seconds of Summer	Pop rock, power pop, pop-punk	Capitol, Hi or Hey	
June 27	Owl City	Ultraviolet		Republic	
June 30	Brian Eno and Karl Hyde	High Life	Art rock	Warp	
June 30	George Ezra	Wanted on Voyage		Columbia	
June 30	Magic!	Don't Kill the Magic	Pop, reggae fusion	Latium, RCA	
June 30	Matthewdavid	In My World	Electronic	Brainfeeder	
June 30	Sanna Nielsen	7	Pop	Warner Music	

== Third quarter ==
=== July ===
List of albums released in July 2014
Go to: January | February | March | April | May | June | July | August | September | October | November | December | Back to top
Release date	Artist	Album	Genre	Label	Ref.
July 1	Antemasque	Antemasque		Nadie Sound	
July 1	Beverly	Careers	Indie rock, noise pop	Kanine, That Summer Feeling	
July 1	Billy Bang and William Parker	Medicine Buddha	Free jazz	NoBusiness	
July 1	Corrosion of Conformity	IX	Stoner rock, sludge metal	Candlelight	
July 1	Every Time I Die	From Parts Unknown	Metalcore, hardcore punk	Epitaph	
July 1	Robin Thicke	Paula	R&B	Star Trak, Interscope	
July 1	Seether	Isolate and Medicate	Post-grunge, alternative metal	Bicycle Music, Concord Music, Spinefarm	
July 1	Tessanne Chin	Count On My Love	Dance-pop, reggae, R&B	Republic, Universal Republic	
July 1	Trey Songz	Trigga	R&B	Atlantic	
July 4	Midge Ure	Fragile		Hypertension Music	
July 4	Sia	1000 Forms of Fear	Electropop	Monkey Puzzle, RCA	
July 4	Tarja	Left in the Dark		Edel	
July 7	Comet Gain	Paperback Ghosts		Fortuna Pop!	
July 7	Example	Live Life Living	EDM	Epic	
July 7	f(x)	Red Light	EDM, electropop, synth-pop	SM	
July 7	Manic Street Preachers	Futurology	Alternative rock, post-punk, dance-rock	Columbia	
July 8	Chelsea Grin	Ashes to Ashes	Deathcore	Artery, Razor & Tie	
July 8	Cold Beat	Over Me		Crime on the Moon	
July 8	Dirty Heads	Sound of Change		Five Seven	
July 8	John Mellencamp	Performs Trouble No More Live at Town Hall	Americana, country blues, heartland rock	Mercury	
July 8	Judas Priest	Redeemer of Souls	Heavy metal	Epic, Columbia	
July 8	Leela James	Fall for You	Soul, R&B, neo soul		
July 8	Starset	Transmissions	Hard rock, alternative rock, electronic rock	Razor & Tie	
July 11	Bleachers	Strange Desire	Indie pop, alternative rock	RCA	
July 11	Jason Mraz	Yes!	Pop rock	Atlantic	
July 11	Sheppard	Bombs Away	Indie pop, indie rock	Empire of Song, Decca, Republic	
July 11	Taylor Henderson	Burnt Letters	Pop, folk, country	Sony Music Australia	
July 14	Fink	Hard Believer		R'COUP'D, Ninja Tune	
July 14	Jungle	Jungle	Nu-disco	XL	
July 14	Slow Club	Complete Surrender	Folk, indie pop	Caroline International	
July 14	Suicide Silence	You Can't Stop Me	Deathcore	Nuclear Blast	
July 15	Betraying the Martyrs	Phantom	Deathcore, metalcore, melodic death metal	Sumerian	
July 15	I, the Breather	Life Reaper	Metalcore	Sumerian	
July 15	Morrissey	World Peace Is None of Your Business	Alternative rock	Harvest	
July 15	Novembers Doom	Bled White	Death-doom, progressive death metal, gothic metal	The End	
July 15	Pennywise	Yesterdays	Punk rock	Epitaph	
July 15	Puss n Boots	No Fools, No Fun		Blue Note	
July 15	Rise Against	The Black Market	Melodic hardcore	Interscope	
July 15	"Weird Al" Yankovic	Mandatory Fun	Comedy	RCA	
July 16	Yes	Heaven & Earth	Progressive rock, soft rock, arena rock	Frontiers	
July 18	Biffy Clyro	Similarities	Alternative rock, experimental rock	14th Floor	
July 18	La Roux	Trouble in Paradise	Synth-pop, new wave, disco	Polydor	
July 19	Neil Cicierega	Mouth Silence	Mashup		
July 21	King Creosote	From Scotland with Love	Folk		
July 22	Alvvays	Alvvays	Indie pop, dream pop, indie rock	Polyvinyl	
July 22	Anberlin	Lowborn	Alternative rock	Tooth & Nail	
July 22	Common	Nobody's Smiling	Hip-hop	ARTium, Def Jam	
July 22	Crown the Empire	The Resistance: Rise of The Runaways	Metalcore, post-hardcore	Rise	
July 22	Dave Douglas and Uri Caine	Present Joys	Jazz	Greenleaf Music	
July 22	Jesse McCartney	In Technicolor	R&B, pop, blue-eyed soul	Eight0Eight Records, Fontana	
July 22	Joyce Manor	Never Hungover Again	Punk rock, pop-punk, indie rock	Epitaph	
July 22	The Muffs	Whoop Dee Doo	Punk rock	Burger	
July 22	Rx Bandits	Gemini, Her Majesty	Progressive rock	MDB Records	
July 22	War of Ages	Supreme Chaos	Metalcore, Christian metal	Facedown	
July 22	Within the Ruins	Phenomena	Metalcore, deathcore, progressive metal	eOne Music, Good Fight Music	
July 28	Basement	Further Sky	Alternative rock	Run for Cover	
July 28	Tom Petty and the Heartbreakers	Hypnotic Eye	Heartland rock, blues rock	Reprise	
July 29	Adelitas Way	Stuck	Alternative metal, hard rock, post-grunge	Virgin	
July 29	Eric Clapton & Friends	The Breeze: An Appreciation of JJ Cale	Blues rock	Bushbranch, Surfdog	
July 29	Jenny Lewis	The Voyager	Indie rock	Warner Bros.	
July 29	PartyNextDoor	PartyNextDoor Two	Alternative R&B, lofi, chillwave	OVO Sound	
July 29	Shabazz Palaces	Lese Majesty	Experimental hip-hop	Sub Pop	
July 29	Theory of a Deadman	Savages	Hard rock, alternative metal, post-grunge	Roadrunner	

=== August ===
List of albums released in August 2014
Go to: January | February | March | April | May | June | July | August | September | October | November | December | Back to top
Release date	Artist	Album	Genre	Label	Ref.
August 1	Alestorm	Sunset on the Golden Age	Folk metal, power metal, pirate metal	Napalm	
August 1	Angus & Julia Stone	Angus & Julia Stone	Folk, acoustic	EMI Music Australia, American	
August 1	Eluveitie	Origins	Folk metal, melodic death metal, Celtic metal	Nuclear Blast	
August 5	Arkells	High Noon	Rock	Dine Alone Records, Universal Music Canada	
August 5	Capture the Crown	Reign of Terror	Metalcore, nu metal	Artery	
August 5	Godsmack	1000hp	Hard rock, alternative metal	Republic, Spinefarm	
August 5	Spoon	They Want My Soul	Indie rock, art rock	Loma Vista, Anti-	
August 6	Fear, and Loathing in Las Vegas	Phase 2	Post hardcore, electronicore, metalcore	VAP	
August 6	FKA twigs	LP1	R&B, electronic	Young Turks	
August 8	Adam Brand	My Side of the Street	Country	Adam Brand Enterprises, ABC Music	
August 8	The Gaslight Anthem	Get Hurt	Alternative rock, heartland rock	Island	
August 8	Hilltop Hoods	Walking Under Stars	Australian hip-hop	Golden Era	
August 11	Sinéad O'Connor	I'm Not Bossy, I'm the Boss	Rock	Nettwerk	
August 12	Brian Setzer	Rockabilly Riot!: All Original	Rockabilly	Surfdog	
August 12	Dilated Peoples	Directors of Photography	Hip-hop	Rhymesayers	
August 12	George Watsky	All You Can Do	Alternative hip-hop	Steel Wool Media, Welk Music Group	
August 12	Porter Robinson	Worlds	Synth-pop	Astralwerks, Virgin	
August 12	The Underachievers	Cellar Door: Terminus ut Exordium	East Coast hip-hop	RPM MSC Distribution	
August 12	Upon a Burning Body	The World Is My Enemy Now	Metalcore	Sumerian	
August 14	Kayo Dot	Coffins on Io	Electronic	The Flenser	
August 15	Accept	Blind Rage	Heavy metal	Nuclear Blast	
August 15	Kimbra	The Golden Echo	Art pop	Warner Bros.	
August 17	James Yorkston	The Cellardyke Recording and Wassailing Society	Folk	Domino	
August 18	Ace Frehley	Space Invader	Hard rock, heavy metal	eOne	
August 18	Courteeners	Concrete Love	Indie rock	PIAS Cooperative	
August 18	DragonForce	Maximum Overload	Power metal	earMUSIC, Metal Blade, JVC Victor	
August 18	Imogen Heap	Sparks	Electropop	RCA, Megaphonic	
August 18	King 810	Memoirs of a Murderer	Nu metal, alternative metal, melodic metalcore	Roadrunner	
August 18	Travis Scott	Days Before Rodeo	Hip-hop	Grand Hustle	
August 18	Twin Atlantic	Great Divide	Rock	Red Bull	
August 18	Wiz Khalifa	Blacc Hollywood	Hip-hop	Rostrum, Atlantic	
August 19	Amy Grant	In Motion: The Remixes		Capitol CMG, Sparrow, Amy Grant Productions	
August 19	Colton Dixon	Anchor	CCM, Christian rock	Sparrow, 19	
August 19	Dr. John	Ske-Dat-De-Dat: The Spirit of Satch	R&B	Proper, Concord	
August 19	He Is Legend	Heavy Fruit	Hard rock, stoner rock, alternative rock	Tragic Hero	
August 19	Liam Bailey	Definitely Now		Flying Buddha, Sony Masterworks	
August 19	Pallbearer	Foundations of Burden	Doom metal	Profound Lore	
August 19	Statik Selektah	What Goes Around	Hip-hop, jazz rap	Showoff Records, Duck Down Music	
August 22	The Rentals	Lost in Alphaville	Alternative rock	Polyvinyl	
August 22	Various artists, Jack Cooper	Mists: Charles Ives for Jazz Orchestra	Jazz, big band, instrumental	Planet Arts	
August 25	Amy Lee	Aftermath	Rock	Amy Lee Music, Inc	
August 25	Ariana Grande	My Everything	Pop, R&B	Republic	
August 25	The Bad Plus	Inevitable Western	Jazz	Okeh	
August 25	Basement Jaxx	Junto		Atlantic Jaxx, PIAS	
August 25	Brad Paisley	Moonshine in the Trunk	Country	Arista Nashville	
August 25	Frnkiero andthe cellabration	Stomachaches	Alternative rock, post-hardcore, punk rock	Staple Records	
August 25	G-Unit	The Beauty of Independence	Hip-hop	G-Unit	
August 25	Opeth	Pale Communion	Progressive rock	Roadrunner	
August 25	Royal Blood	Royal Blood	Garage rock, hard rock, blues rock	Warner Bros.	
August 25	Rustie	Green Language		Warp	
August 25	Ty Segall	Manipulator	Psychedelic rock, glam rock, garage rock	Drag City	
August 25	The Wytches	Annabel Dream Reader		Heavenly	
August 25	Yandel	Legacy: De Líder a Leyenda Tour	Reggaeton	Sony Music Latin	
August 26	Mono/Poly	Golden Skies	Electronic	Brainfeeder	
August 26	The New Pornographers	Brill Bruisers	Indie rock	Last Gang, Matador	
August 26	Souls of Mischief	There Is Only Now	Hip-hop	Linear Labs, Essential Music	
August 26	Thousand Foot Krutch	Oxygen: Inhale	Nu metal, pop rock, post-grunge		
August 27	Alexandra Stan	Unlocked	Dance, techno, pop	Victor Entertainment Corp, Ultra	
August 27	HammerFall	(r)Evolution	Power metal, heavy metal	Nuclear Blast	
August 29	Jimmy Barnes	30:30 Hindsight	Rock	Liberation Music	
August 29	Kasey Chambers	Bittersweet	Country, pop	Warner Bros.	
August 29	Maroon 5	V	Pop, pop rock	222, Interscope	
August 29	Zoot Woman	Star Climbing	Synth-pop	Embassy One Records	

=== September ===
List of albums released in September 2014
Go to: January | February | March | April | May | June | July | August | September | October | November | December | Back to top
Release date	Artist	Album	Genre	Label	Ref.
September 1	The Pierces	Creation	Folk rock	Polydor	
September 1	Pulled Apart by Horses	Blood	Alternative rock, post-hardcore	Best Of The Best, Sony RED	
September 2	Blonde Redhead	Barragán	Alternative rock, art rock, dream pop	Kobalt	
September 2	Code Orange	I Am King	Metalcore, post-hardcore	Deathwish	
September 2	The Color Morale	Hold On Pain Ends	Post-hardcore	Fearless	
September 2	Counting Crows	Somewhere Under Wonderland	Alternative rock	Capitol	
September 2	Earth	Primitive and Deadly	Doom metal, post-rock	Southern Lord	
September 2	Homeboy Sandman	Hallways	Hip-hop	Stones Throw	
September 2	Jeezy	Seen It All: The Autobiography	Hip-hop	Def Jam, CTE World	
September 2	The Killjoy Club (Insane Clown Posse and Da Mafia 6ix)	Reindeer Games	Hardcore hip-hop	Psychopathic	
September 2	Nick Carter & Jordan Knight	Nick & Knight	Pop	Nick & Knight, Mass Appeal, BMG	
September 2	Tops	Picture You Staring		Arbutus	
September 2	The Vines	Wicked Nature	Alternative rock	Wicked Nature Music	
September 5	Banks	Goddess	Electronica, R&B, trip hop	Harvest	
September 5	Emarosa	Versus	Alternative rock	Rise	
September 5	Karen O	Crush Songs	Indie rock, lo-fi	Cult	
September 5	The Mark Turner Quartet	Lathe of Heaven	Jazz	ECM	
September 5	Vance Joy	Dream Your Life Away	Indie folk, indie pop	Liberation, Warner Music	
September 8	Interpol	El Pintor	Indie rock, post-punk revival	Matador, Soft Limit	
September 8	The Kooks	Listen	Indie rock	Virgin EMI	
September 8	Robert Plant	Lullaby and the Ceaseless Roar	Folk rock, worldbeat, experimental rock	Nonesuch, Warner Bros.	
September 8	Ryan Adams	Ryan Adams	Rock, alternative country	PAX AM	
September 8	Tricky	Adrian Thaws	Trip hop, hip house, dub	False Idols	
September 9	Better Than Ezra	All Together Now	Alternative rock	The End	
September 9	Brothers Osborne	Brothers Osborne	Country	EMI Nashville	
September 9	Busdriver	Perfect Hair	Hip-hop	Big Dada	
September 9	Death from Above 1979	The Physical World	Dance-punk, noise rock, alternative rock	Last Gang	
September 9	Francisca Valenzuela	Tajo Abierto	Latin pop, pop, synth-pop	Frantastic Records, Sin Anestesia	
September 9	Hiss Golden Messenger	Lateness of Dancers		Merge	
September 9	In Flames	Siren Charms	Alternative metal	Sony Music	
September 9	Jhené Aiko	Souled Out	Alternative R&B	ARTium, Def Jam	
September 9	Justin Townes Earle	Single Mothers	Country	Vagrant, Loose	
September 9	Lecrae	Anomaly	Christian hip-hop	Reach	
September 9	Lee Brice	I Don't Dance	Country	Curb	
September 9	Mannequin Pussy	Mannequin Pussy	Punk rock	Rarebit Records, Tiny Engines	
September 9	Meghan Trainor	Title	Pop, R&B	Epic	
September 9	Michelle Williams	Journey to Freedom	Contemporary gospel, R&B	E1 Music, Light	
September 9	Pere Ubu	Carnival of Souls	Alternative rock	Fire	
September 9	Rittz	Next to Nothing	Hip-hop	Strange Music	
September 9	Simian Mobile Disco	Whorl		Anti-	
September 9	Sloan	Commonwealth		Murder, Yep Roc	
September 9	Switchfoot	The Edge of the Earth	Alternative rock	lowercase people, Atlantic	
September 9	Tiny Moving Parts	Pleasant Living		Triple Crown	
September 9	U2	Songs of Innocence	Rock	Island, Interscope	
September 10	Slash featuring Myles Kennedy and The Conspirators	World on Fire	Hard rock, heavy metal	Dik Hayd International, Roadrunner	
September 11	Lil' Kim	Hard Core 2K14	Hip-hop	International Rock Star Records	
September 12	Chris Brown	X	R&B	RCA	
September 12	The Script	No Sound Without Silence	Pop rock, R&B	Phonogenic, Columbia	
September 15	Catfish and the Bottlemen	The Balcony	Indie rock, alternative rock	Island, Communion Music	
September 15	Irène Schweizer and Jürg Wickihalder	Spring	Jazz, free improvisation	Intakt	
September 15	Medeski Scofield Martin & Wood	Juice	Jazz	Indirecto Records	
September 15	Motionless in White	Reincarnate	Industrial metal, melodic metalcore, gothic metal	Fearless	
September 15	My Brightest Diamond	This Is My Hand	Indie rock	Asthmatic Kitty	
September 15	Octave Minds	Octave Minds	Electronic, downtempo	Boysnoize Records	
September 16	Barbra Streisand	Partners	Traditional pop, vocal music	Columbia	
September 16	Cannibal Corpse	A Skeletal Domain	Death metal	Metal Blade	
September 16	The Contortionist	Language	Progressive metal, progressive rock	eOne, Good Fight	
September 16	Flyleaf	Between the Stars	Alternative rock, post-grunge	Loud & Proud	
September 16	For King & Country	Run Wild. Live Free. Love Strong.	Contemporary Christian	Word	
September 16	Iron Reagan	The Tyranny of Will	Crossover thrash	Relapse	
September 16	Lowell	We Loved Her Dearly			
September 16	The Madden Brothers	Greetings from California	Pop rock, folk rock	Capitol	
September 16	Nico & Vinz	Black Star Elephant	Hip-hop, R&B	Warner Bros., 5 Star Entertainment	
September 16	Shellac	Dude Incredible	Noise rock, math rock, post-hardcore	Touch and Go	
September 16	Tim McGraw	Sundown Heaven Town	Country	Big Machine	
September 16	Train	Bulletproof Picasso	Rock, pop rock	Columbia	
September 16	Wadada Leo Smith	The Great Lakes Suites	Jazz	TUM Records	
September 17	Wizkid	Ayo	Reggae, afrobeats, highlife	Empire Mates, Starboy Entertainment	
September 19	Aphex Twin	Syro	Electronic	Warp	
September 19	Hozier	Hozier	Blues, soul, R&B	Rubyworks, Island, Columbia	
September 19	Leonard Cohen	Popular Problems	Contemporary folk, folk-pop, soft rock	Columbia	
September 19	Lights	Little Machines	Electropop	Warner Bros.	
September 19	Professor Green	Growing Up in Public	British hip-hop, grime	Virgin	
September 19	Tony Bennett & Lady Gaga	Cheek to Cheek	Jazz, traditional pop	Streamline, Interscope, Columbia	
September 21	Joanne Shaw Taylor	The Dirty Truth	Blues rock, electric blues	Axehouse Music	
September 22	Alt-J	This Is All Yours		Infectious	
September 22	Decapitated	Blood Mantra	Groove metal, technical death metal	Nuclear Blast, Mystic Production	
September 22	John Mellencamp	Plain Spoken	Americana, folk rock, roots rock	Republic	
September 23	Big & Rich	Gravity	Country pop	Big & Rich Records	
September 23	Dntel	Human Voice		Leaving	
September 23	Goat	Commune	Experimental rock, worldbeat, neo-psychedelia	Sub Pop	
September 23	Information Society	Hello World	Synth-pop, freestyle	Hakatak International	
September 23	Jennifer Hudson	JHUD	R&B	RCA	
September 23	John Coltrane	Offering: Live at Temple University	Free jazz	Resonance	
September 23	Julian Casablancas+The Voidz	Tyranny	Experimental rock, noise rock, neo-psychedelia	Cult	
September 23	Kenny Chesney	The Big Revival	Country	Columbia Nashville, Blue Chair Records	
September 23	Lee Ann Womack	The Way I'm Livin'	Neotraditional country, Americana, roots revival	Sugar Hill	
September 23	Lenny Kravitz	Strut	Rock	Roxie Records, Kobalt	
September 23	Lori McKenna	Numbered Doors	Country, folk	Hoodie Songs	
September 23	Perfume Genius	Too Bright	Lo-fi, pop, soul	Matador	
September 23	Sondre Lerche	Please	Indie pop	Mona, Yep Roc	
September 23	Wadada Leo Smith, Jamie Saft, Joe Morris and Balázs Pándi	Red Hill	Jazz	RareNoise	
September 23	Whirr	Sway	Shoegaze	Graveface	
September 24	Mr. Big	...The Stories We Could Tell	Hard rock	WOWOW Entertainment, Frontiers	
September 24	Tove Lo	Queen of the Clouds	Electropop	Island	
September 26	Thom Yorke	Tomorrow's Modern Boxes	Electronica		
September 29	The Dø	Shake Shook Shaken	Pop, synth-pop, electropop	Get Down!, Cinq 7, Wagram	
September 29	Electric Wizard	Time to Die	Doom metal, stoner metal	Spinefarm	
September 29	Flying Colors	Second Nature	Progressive rock, hard rock	Mascot Label	
September 29	Gerard Way	Hesitant Alien	Alternative rock, Britpop	Warner Bros.	
September 29	Marmozets	The Weird and Wonderful Marmozets	Alternative rock, post-hardcore, math rock	Roadrunner	
September 29	Rich Gang	Rich Gang: Tha Tour Pt. 1	Hip-hop	Cash Money	
September 29	Robin Gibb	50 St. Catherine's Drive	Soul, contemporary R&B, neo soul	Rhino	
September 29	The Vaselines	V for Vaselines	Alternative rock, indie rock, punk rock	Rosary Music	
September 30	Annie Lennox	Nostalgia	Soul, jazz	Island	
September 30	Blake Shelton	Bringing Back the Sunshine	Country	Warner Bros. Nashville	
September 30	Bryan Adams	Tracks of My Years	Rock	Polydor	
September 30	Colbie Caillat	Gypsy Heart	Pop rock, folk, R&B	Republic	
September 30	Diamond D	The Diam Piece	Hip-hop	Dymond Mine Records	
September 30	Electric Youth	Innerworld	Synth-pop	Secretly Canadian, Last Gang	
September 30	Finch	Back to Oblivion	Post-hardcore	Razor & Tie	
September 30	Lady Antebellum	747	Country	Capitol Nashville	
September 30	Lucinda Williams	Down Where the Spirit Meets the Bone	Americana, folk rock, alternative country	Highway 20 Records	
September 30	Melissa Etheridge	This Is M.E.	Rock	ME Records	
September 30	Michael W. Smith	The Spirit of Christmas	Christmas, CCM, country	Capitol	
September 30	Nonpoint	The Return	Alternative metal	Razor & Tie, Metal Blade	
September 30	Prince	Art Official Age	R&B, electro-funk	NPG, Warner Bros.	
September 30	Prince & 3rdeyegirl	Plectrumelectrum	Funk rock	NPG, Warner Bros.	
September 30	Roseanna Vitro	Clarity: Music of Clare Fischer	Vocal jazz, Afro-Cuban jazz, Brazilian jazz	Random Act Records	
September 30	Seth MacFarlane	Holiday for Swing	Christmas, traditional pop, swing	Republic	
September 30	Sick of It All	The Last Act of Defiance	Hardcore punk	Century Media	
September 30	Steve Aoki	Neon Future I	EDM	Dim Mak, Ultra	
September 30	Stevie Nicks	24 Karat Gold: Songs from the Vault	Rock	Reprise	

== Fourth quarter ==
=== October ===
List of albums released in October 2014
Go to: January | February | March | April | May | June | July | August | September | October | November | December | Back to top
Release date	Artist	Album	Genre	Label	Ref.
October 2	Tofubeats	First Album	J-pop, electropop	Unborde	
October 3	Betty Who	Take Me When You Go	Synth-pop	RCA	
October 3	Scar Symmetry	The Singularity (Phase I – Neohumanity)	Melodic death metal, progressive metal, power metal	Nuclear Blast	
October 3	Tinashe	Aquarius	R&B, alternative R&B, pop	RCA	
October 6	Allo Darlin'	We Come from the Same Place	Indie pop	Fortuna Pop!, Slumberland	
October 6	Bill Frisell	Guitar in the Space Age!	Jazz, pop, rock	Okeh	
October 6	Caribou	Our Love	Electronic, house	City Slang, Merge	
October 6	Flying Lotus	You're Dead!	Electronic, experimental, jazz fusion	Warp	
October 6	Gorgon City	Sirens	Deep house, dance	Virgin EMI, Black Butter	
October 6	Iceage	Plowing Into the Field of Love	Post-punk, gothic rock, punk rock	Matador	
October 6	Jamie Cullum	Interlude	Jazz, big band	Island	
October 6	Johnny Marr	Playland	Indie rock	New Voodoo, Warner Bros.	
October 6	Lower Than Atlantis	Lower Than Atlantis	Alternative rock	Sony Music	
October 6	Philip Selway	Weatherhouse	Art rock	Bella Union	
October 6	Sanctuary	The Year the Sun Died	Power metal, thrash metal	Century Media	
October 6	Vashti Bunyan	Heartleap	Psychedelic folk, freak folk	FatCat	
October 6	We Were Promised Jetpacks	Unravelling	Indie rock, alternative rock	FatCat	
October 6	A Winged Victory for the Sullen	Atomos	Ambient	Kranky, Erased Tapes	
October 6	Zola Jesus	Taiga	Synth-pop	Mute	
October 7	Alex & Sierra	It's About Us	Folk-pop	Columbia	
October 7	C. W. Stoneking	Gon' Boogaloo	Blues, rock and roll		
October 7	Ex Hex	Rips	Garage rock, power pop, rock and roll	Merge	
October 7	Godflesh	A World Lit Only by Fire	Industrial metal	Avalanche	
October 7	Jason Aldean	Old Boots, New Dirt	Country	Broken Bow	
October 7	Keyshia Cole	Point of No Return	R&B, hip-hop, soul	Interscope	
October 7	NehruvianDOOM	NehruvianDoom	Hip-hop	Lex	
October 7	New Found Glory	Resurrection	Pop-punk, alternative rock	Hopeless	
October 7	Peaking Lights	Cosmic Logic	Synth-pop	Weird World, Domino	
October 7	Sbtrkt	Wonder Where We Land	Electronica, UK garage	Young Turks	
October 7	Single Mothers	Negative Qualities		Hot Charity	
October 7	Sixx:A.M.	Modern Vintage	Hard rock	Eleven Seven	
October 7	Traci Braxton	Crash & Burn	R&B	Entertainment One	
October 7	Vince Staples	Hell Can Wait	Hip-hop	ARTium Recordings, Def Jam	
October 7	Weezer	Everything Will Be Alright in the End	Alternative rock	Republic	
October 7	Wild Party	Phantom Pop		Old Friends	
October 7	Yellowcard	Lift a Sail	Alternative rock	Razor & Tie	
October 10	...And You Will Know Us by the Trail of Dead	IX	Alternative rock	Superball Music	
October 10	Ella Henderson	Chapter One	Pop, soul	Syco	
October 13	Jessie J	Sweet Talker	Pop	Lava, Republic	
October 13	Jessie Ware	Tough Love	Pop, R&B, electronica	PMR, Island, Interscope	
October 14	The Acacia Strain	Coma Witch	Metalcore, deathcore	Rise	
October 14	Alexz Johnson	Let 'Em Eat Cake			
October 14	Bob Seger	Ride Out	Rock, heartland rock	Capitol	
October 14	The Bots	Pink Palms	Indie rock	Fader Label	
October 14	Dami Im	Heart Beats	Pop	Sony Music Australia	
October 14	Enterprise Earth	23	Deathcore	We Are Triumphant	
October 14	Exodus	Blood In, Blood Out	Thrash metal	Nuclear Blast	
October 14	Fit for a King	Slave to Nothing	Metalcore	Solid State	
October 14	Florida Georgia Line	Anything Goes	Country	Republic Nashville	
October 14	Foxygen	...And Star Power	Psychedelic pop	Jagjaguwar	
October 14	Hoodie Allen	People Keep Talking	Hip-hop	ADA	
October 14	Idina Menzel	Holiday Wishes	Christmas	Warner Bros.	
October 14	Kevin Morby	Still Life	Indie rock	Woodsist	
October 14	Kindness	Otherness		Female Energy, Mom + Pop	
October 14	KMFDM	Our Time Will Come	Industrial rock	KMFDM, Metropolis	
October 14	Mary Lambert	Heart on My Sleeve			
October 14	Melvins	Hold It In	Experimental rock, sludge metal	Ipecac	
October 14	Museum of Love	Museum of Love		DFA	
October 14	OK Go	Hungry Ghosts	Power pop	Paracadute, BMG	
October 14	Sammy Hagar with Vic Johnson	Lite Roast	Acoustic	Mailboat	
October 14	Set It Off	Duality	Pop-punk, R&B	Equal Vision, Rude	
October 14	You+Me	rose ave.	Folk	RCA	
October 17	Aretha Franklin	Aretha Franklin Sings the Great Diva Classics		RCA	
October 17	The Church	Further/Deeper	Alternative rock, neo-psychedelia, psychedelic rock	Unorthodox Records	
October 17	Billy Idol	Kings & Queens of the Underground	Rock	BFI	
October 17	Kiesza	Sound of a Woman	House, dance-pop, EDM	Lokal Legend, Island	
October 17	Nicole Scherzinger	Big Fat Lie	R&B, pop	RCA	
October 17	Ricki-Lee Coulter	Dance in the Rain	R&B, pop, dance-pop	EMI	
October 19	Slipknot	.5: The Gray Chapter	Heavy metal, nu metal, alternative metal	Roadrunner	
October 20	Baxter Dury	It's a Pleasure		PIAS	
October 20	Freddie Gibbs & Madlib	Knicks (Remix)		Madlib Invazion	
October 20	Inspiral Carpets	Inspiral Carpets	Alternative rock, indie rock	Cherry Red	
October 20	Thurston Moore	The Best Day	Alternative rock, noise rock	Matador	
October 21	Ben Howard	I Forget Where We Were	Folk, indie folk, ambient	Island, tôt Ou tard, Republic	
October 21	Boyz II Men	Collide	R&B	BMG, MSM Music Group	
October 21	Bush	Man on the Run	Alternative rock, post-grunge	Zuma Rock Records	
October 21	Cold War Kids	Hold My Home	Indie rock	Downtown	
October 21	Earth, Wind & Fire	Holiday	Christmas, R&B	Legacy	
October 21	Little Big Town	Pain Killer	Country	Capitol Nashville	
October 21	Logic	Under Pressure	Hip-hop	Visionary Music, Def Jam	
October 21	Mark Lanegan	Phantom Radio	Blues, folktronica	Vagrant	
October 21	Neil Diamond	Melody Road	Pop, folk	Capitol	
October 21	Primus	Primus & the Chocolate Factory with the Fungi Ensemble	Experimental rock	ATO, Prawn Song	
October 21	Scott Walker and Sunn O)))	Soused		4AD	
October 21	Susan Boyle	Hope		Syco, Sony Music	
October 21	T.I.	Paperwork	Hip-hop	Grand Hustle, Columbia	
October 24	Obituary	Inked in Blood	Death metal	Gibtown Music, Relapse	
October 24	Run the Jewels	Run the Jewels 2	Hip-hop	Mass Appeal, RED	
October 24	Terje Isungset & Arve Henriksen	World of Glass		All Ice	
October 24	The Ting Tings	Super Critical	Disco, funk, pop	Finca Records	
October 27	Black Veil Brides	Black Veil Brides	Hard rock, glam metal	Lava, Universal Republic	
October 27	Chris Tomlin	Love Ran Red	CCM, worship	sixstepsrecords	
October 27	Danity Kane	DK3	R&B, pop	Stereotypes, BMG, Mass Appeal	
October 27	Devin Townsend	Z²	Progressive metal, industrial metal, progressive rock	HevyDevy	
October 27	Dillon Francis	Money Sucks, Friends Rule	Electro house, EDM, synth-pop	Columbia, Mad Decent	
October 27	The Flaming Lips	With a Little Help from My Fwends	Psychedelic rock, neo-psychedelia	Warner Bros.	
October 27	Rancid	Honor Is All We Know	Punk rock, ska punk	Hellcat, Epitaph	
October 27	Taylor Swift	1989	Synth-pop	Big Machine	
October 27	Transatlantic	KaLIVEoscope	Progressive rock	Radiant, Metal Blade, Inside Out	
October 27	Trip Lee	Rise	Christian hip-hop	Reach	
October 27	The Twilight Sad	Nobody Wants to Be Here and Nobody Wants to Leave	Post-punk revival, indie rock	FatCat	
October 28	At the Gates	At War with Reality	Melodic death metal	Century Media	
October 28	Black Milk	If There's a Hell Below	Hip-hop	Computer Ugly Recirsd, Fat Beats Records	
October 28	Future	Monster	Hip-hop, trap	Freebandz	
October 28	Lagwagon	Hang	Punk rock, skate punk, pop-punk	Fat Wreck Chords	
October 28	Live	The Turn	Alternative rock, post-grunge, hard rock	Think Loud Recordings	
October 28	Mykki Blanco	Gay Dog Food		UNO Records, Ormolycka	
October 30	M.I	The Chairman	Hip-hop	Chocolate City, Loopy Music	
October 31	Calvin Harris	Motion	EDM, electro house	Fly Eye, Columbia	
October 31	Cavalera Conspiracy	Pandemonium	Thrash metal, death metal	Napalm	
October 31	Grouper	Ruins	Ambient	Kranky	
October 31	King Gizzard & the Lizard Wizard	I'm in Your Mind Fuzz	Garage rock, psychedelic rock	Heavenly, Flightless	
October 31	Lordi	Scare Force One	Hard rock, heavy metal, shock rock	AFM	
October 31	Simple Minds	Big Music	Pop rock, synth-pop	Sony Music	
October 31	The Smith Street Band	Throw Me in the River	Punk rock, indie rock	Poison City, Banquet, SideOneDummy	

=== November ===
List of albums released in November 2014
Go to: January | February | March | April | May | June | July | August | September | October | November | December | Back to top
Release date	Artist	Album	Genre	Label	Ref.
November 3	Clark	Clark	IDM, electro, bass	Warp	
November 3	Dean Blunt	Black Metal	Experimental, indie pop	Rough Trade	
November 3	Deptford Goth	Songs		37 Adventures	
November 4	Ani DiFranco	Allergic to Water	Indie rock, folk rock	Righteous Babe	
November 4	Bette Midler	It's the Girls!	Traditional pop	Warner Music	
November 4	The Doobie Brothers	Southbound	Country rock	Arista Nashville	
November 4	Joe Budden	Some Love Lost	Hip-hop	Mood Muzik Entertainment, eOne	
November 4	Mother Mother	Very Good Bad Thing	Indie rock	Universal Music Canada, Def Jam	
November 4	Neil Young	Storytone	Folk rock	Reprise	
November 4	Psychostick	IV: Revenge of the Vengeance	Comedy rock	Rock Ridge	
November 4	Ryan Hemsworth	Alone for the First Time	Electronic	Last Gang, Secret Songs	
November 5	Shiina Ringo	Hi Izuru Tokoro	Pop, rock, jazz	EMI Japan	
November 7	Albatrosh	Night Owl	Jazz	Rune Grammofon	
November 7	Azealia Banks	Broke with Expensive Taste	Dance-pop, hip house	Azealia Banks, Prospect Park	
November 7	Cheryl	Only Human	Electronic, pop, R&B	Polydor	
November 7	iamamiwhoami	Blue	Synth-pop, electropop	To whom it may concern.	
November 7	Knife Party	Abandon Ship	Electro house	Earstorm	
November 7	Machine Head	Bloodstone & Diamonds	Groove metal, thrash metal	Nuclear Blast	
November 7	Pink Floyd	The Endless River	Ambient, psychedelic, blues rock	Parlophone, Columbia	
November 7	Röyksopp	The Inevitable End	Electropop, electronic rock	Dog Triumph	
November 7	Tim Wheeler	Lost Domain		Sony RED	
November 10	Big K.R.I.T.	Cadillactica	Hip-hop	Def Jam, Cinematic Music	
November 10	Foo Fighters	Sonic Highways	Alternative rock, post-grunge, hard rock	RCA	
November 10	Hookworms	The Hum	Noise rock, psychedelic rock	Weird World	
November 10	Nick Jonas	Nick Jonas	R&B, pop	Island	
November 10	Queen	Queen Forever	Rock	Virgin EMI, Hollywood	
November 10	Whitney Houston	Whitney Houston Live: Her Greatest Performances	R&B, soul, pop	Legacy	
November 11	The Birthday Massacre	Superstition	Electronic rock	Metropolis	
November 11	Frontier Ruckus	Sitcom Afterlife	Folk rock, indie pop	Quite Scientific Records	
November 11	Garth Brooks	Man Against Machine	Country pop, pop rock	Pearl, RCA Nashville	
November 11	Ha*Ash	Primera Fila: Hecho Realidad	Acoustic music, latin pop	Sony Music Latin	
November 11	Mitski	Bury Me at Makeout Creek	Indie rock	Double Double Whammy, Don Giovanni	
November 11	The New Basement Tapes	Lost on the River: The New Basement Tapes		Electromagnetic Recordings, Harvest	
November 11	Serengeti	Kenny Dennis III	Hip-hop	Joyful Noise	
November 11	Willie Nile	If I Was a River	Folk rock	River House Records, Blue Rose	
November 14	Gemma Hayes	Bones + Longing	Indie pop, indie rock	Chasing Dragons	
November 14	Kerser	King		Obese	
November 14	Monster Magnet	Milking the Stars: A Re-Imagining of Last Patrol	Stoner rock	Napalm	
November 14	Nickelback	No Fixed Address	Post-grunge, hard rock	Republic	
November 17	Ariel Pink	Pom Pom	Art rock, psychedelic pop	4AD	
November 17	Bella Thorne	Jersey	Teen pop, electropop	Hollywood	
November 17	Bryan Ferry	Avonmore	Art pop sophisti-pop	BMG	
November 17	In This Moment	Black Widow	Gothic metal, alternative metal, industrial metal	Atlantic	
November 17	One Direction	Four	Pop	Syco	
November 17	Thompson	Family	Folk rock	Fantasy, Concord Music	
November 17	Trisha Yearwood	PrizeFighter: Hit After Hit	Country, country pop	Gwendolyn Records, RCA Nashville	
November 17	Various artists	The Hunger Games: Mockingjay, Part 1	Electronic, Alternative pop	Republic	
November 18	Fugazi	First Demo	Post-hardcore	Dischord	
November 18	Kristin Chenoweth	Coming Home	Country, pop	Concord	
November 18	Lena Katina	This Is Who I Am	Europop, rock, electronic	Katina Music	
November 18	Mr. Oizo	The Church	Wonky, electro house, glitch	Brainfeeder	
November 18	Steve Taylor & The Perfect Foil	Goliath	Alternative rock, CCM, new wave revival	Splint Entertainment	
November 18	TV on the Radio	Seeds	Art rock, indie rock, synth-pop	Harvest	
November 21	Boyzone	Dublin to Detroit	Soul	East West	
November 21	David Guetta	Listen	EDM, pop	What a Music, Parlophone, Atlantic	
November 21	Guy Sebastian	Madness	Pop, R&B	Sony Music Australia	
November 21	Iggy Azalea	Reclassified	Hip-hop	Virgin EMI, Def Jam	
November 21	Olly Murs	Never Been Better	Pop	Epic, Syco	
November 21	Pitbull	Globalization	Hip-hop	Mr. 305, Polo Grounds, RCA	
November 21	Rise of the Northstar	Welcame	Metalcore, crossover thrash, groove metal	Nuclear Blast	
November 21	The Veronicas	The Veronicas	Progressive pop	Sony Music Australia	
November 24	Beyoncé	Beyoncé: Platinum Edition	Electro, R&B	Parkwood, Columbia	
November 24	Circa Survive	Descensus	Progressive rock, indie rock, post-hardcore	Sumerian	
November 24	Copeland	Ixora	Alternative rock, indie pop	Tooth & Nail	
November 24	Full of Hell & Merzbow	Full of Hell & Merzbow	Grindcore, noise	Profound Lore	
November 24	Kelis	Live in London		Concert Live	
November 24	Mary J. Blige	The London Sessions	R&B, UK garage, deep house	Capitol, Matriarch	
November 24	Rick Ross	Hood Billionaire	Hip-hop	Maybach, Def Jam, Slip-n-Slide	
November 24	Selena Gomez	For You	Dance-pop	Hollywood	
November 24	Sleaford Mods	Tiswas EP	Post-punk, hip-hop, funk	Invada	
November 24	Various artists	Shady XV	Hip-hop	Shady, Interscope	
November 25	Nels Cline and Julian Lage	Room	Rock, jazz	Mack Avenue	
November 25	Tiziano Ferro	TZN - The Best of Tiziano Ferro	Pop, R&B	Universal	
November 25	Your Old Droog	Your Old Droog			
November 28	AC/DC	Rock or Bust	Hard rock	Columbia	
November 28	Justice Crew	Live by the Words	Pop	Sony Music Australia	
November 28	Parquet Courts	Content Nausea	Indie rock, post-punk	What's Your Rupture?	
November 28	Pavlov's Dog	The Pekin Tapes	Progressive rock, art rock	Rockville Music	
November 28	Take That	III	Pop	Polydor	

=== December ===
List of albums released in December 2014
Go to: January | February | March | April | May | June | July | August | September | October | November | December | Back to top
Release date	Artist	Album	Genre	Label	Ref.
December 1	McBusted	McBusted		Island	
December 2	She & Him	Classics	Indie pop, jazz	Columbia	
December 2	Walk the Moon	Talking Is Hard		RCA	
December 2	Willie Nelson	December Day: Willie's Stash, Vol. 1	Country	Legacy	
December 2	Wu-Tang Clan	A Better Tomorrow	Hip-hop	Asylum, Warner Bros.	
December 8	Robbie Williams	Under the Radar Volume 1	Britpop, pop, pop rock	Robbie Williams	
December 8	Union J	You Got It All – The Album	Pop	Epic, Syco	
December 9	Angels & Airwaves	The Dream Walker	Alternative rock, space rock	To the Stars	
December 9	Carrie Underwood	Greatest Hits: Decade #1	Country	Arista Nashville	
December 9	Ghostface Killah	36 Seasons	Hip-hop	Tommy Boy	
December 9	J. Cole	2014 Forest Hills Drive	Hip-hop	Dreamville, Roc Nation, Columbia	
December 9	JMSN	JMSN (Blue Album)		White Room Records	
December 9	K. Michelle	Anybody Wanna Buy a Heart?	R&B, soul	Atlantic	
December 9	PRhyme	PRhyme	Hip-hop	PRhyme Records	
December 9	The Smashing Pumpkins	Monuments to an Elegy	Alternative rock	Martha's Music	
December 10	Dir en grey	Arche	Avant-garde metal, progressive metal	Firewall Div.	
December 12	Nicki Minaj	The Pinkprint	Hip-hop	Young Money, Cash Money, Republic	
December 12	Praiz	Rich & Famous	R&B, pop	X3M	
December 15	Charli XCX	Sucker	Pop-punk, power pop, punk rock	Asylum, Atlantic, Neon Gold	
December 15	D'Angelo and The Vanguard	Black Messiah	Soul, funk, R&B	RCA	
December 16	Ludacris	Burning Bridges	Hip-hop	Disturbing tha Peace, Def Jam	
