= Autumn, Again =

Studio album by A Sunny Day in Glasgow
- Released: October 19, 2010
- Recorded: 2008–2010
- Studio: Downtown Performing Arts Center (Lambertville, New Jersey); Naomi Donabedian's apartment (Brooklyn, New York); West Philly Vocoder (Philadelphia, Pennsylvania); Alle Rut (Sydney); Hotel Bloom (Brussels); Remi's grandmother's apartment (Reims); Oetinger Villa (Darmstadt); Pension Raidel (Rothenburg ob der Tauber); Harcourt Hotel (Dublin); Hotel Barcelona Princess (Barcelona)
- Genre: Dream pop; shoegaze
- Length: 33:38

A Sunny Day in Glasgow chronology
Nitetime Rainbows (2010)	Autumn, Again (2010)	Sea When Absent (2014)

Professional ratings
Aggregate scores
Source	Rating
Metacritic	58/100
Review scores
Source	Rating
Consequence	3.5/5 stars
Pitchfork	7.9/10
PopMatters	2/10
Tiny Mix Tapes	4/5

Autumn, Again is the third studio album by American indie rock band A Sunny Day in Glasgow. It was self-released by the band on October 19, 2010 as a free digital download, as well as on LP in a limited run of 500 copies.

== Background ==
A Sunny Day in Glasgow recorded the songs on Autumn, Again at various locations in Australia, Europe and the United States from 2008 to 2010. The songs were originally composed by the band for their previous album Ashes Grammar (2009), but ultimately did not make the final track listing for that album.

== Track listing ==
All tracks are written by Ben Daniels, except where noted

No.	Title	Writer(s)	Length
1.	"Autumn, Again"		0:43
2.	"Fall in Love"		2:41
3.	"Petition to Refrain from Repetition"		1:26
4.	"Sigh, Inhibitionist (Come All Day with Me)"		4:55
5.	"Moments on the Lawn"		1:49
6.	"Drink Drank Drunk"		3:57
7.	"Violet Mary Haunts Me or Loss of Forgetfulness on Renfrew Street"		2:46
8.	"How Does Somebody Say When They Like You?"	Daniels; Jen Goma	4:39
9.	"Calling It Love Isn't Love (Don't Fall in Love)"		3:41
10.	"This Assclown Eats Ambien or Nobody Likes You (No Art)"		1:58
11.	"100/0 (Snowdays Forever)"	Daniels; Annie Fredrickson; Goma	5:03
Total length:			33:38

== Personnel ==
Credits are adapted from the album's digital notes.

A Sunny Day in Glasgow

- Ben Daniels
- Annie Fredrickson
- Jen Goma
- Adam Herndon
- Josh Meakim
- Ryan Newmyer

Production

- Ben Daniels – mixing, recording
- Thomas Kee – mastering
- Josh Meakim – mixing, recording

Design

- Naomi Donabedian – design, layout
- Edvard Munch – cover artwork
