= Mother (Cold Beat album) =

2020 studio album by Cold Beat

Studio album by Cold Beat
- Released: February 28, 2020
- Genre: Synth-pop; post-punk; new wave
- Length: 35:25
- Label: DFA
- Producer: Cold Beat

Cold Beat chronology
| Chaos by Invitation (2017) | Mother (2020) | War Garden (2021) |

Mother is the fourth studio album by the American synth-pop band Cold Beat, released on February 28, 2020, on DFA Records. It is the band's only release for the label. The album was written largely while frontwoman Hannah Lew was pregnant with her first child, and its lyrics address motherhood, climate change, and political anxiety through 1980s-influenced electronic arrangements.

Mother received generally favorable reviews. Bandcamp Daily named it Album of the Day, AllMusic's Heather Phares rated it four out of five stars, and BrooklynVegan placed it at number 32 on its Indie Basement Top 40 Albums of 2020 year-end list.

== Background and recording ==
Cold Beat is the project of San Francisco musician Hannah Lew, formerly the bassist of the post-punk trio Grass Widow. Mother was preceded by the lead single "Flat Earth", released on December 6, 2019, which marked the band's signing to DFA Records. A second single, "Prism", followed with a music video directed by Lew that premiered on January 10, 2020.

Lew wrote much of the album during her pregnancy, and described the record as reflecting both anxiety about the world and the experience of impending motherhood. Critics identified sonic touchstones including the Eurythmics, the Human League, Depeche Mode, and Gary Numan. The album was recorded by the band, mixed by Mikey Young, and mastered by Joe Lambert.

== Critical reception ==
Writing for Bandcamp Daily, J. Edward Keyes described Mother as operating "at a kind of icy, android-like remove" and praised the band for nailing "their chosen touchstones with striking efficiency." In Treble, Konstantin Rega compared the singles to the Cocteau Twins and called the album "a concise and dreamy pop album that leaves a craving for more." AllMusic's Heather Phares gave the album four out of five stars.

BrooklynVegan's Bill Pearis ranked Mother at number 32 on the publication's Indie Basement Top 40 Albums of 2020 list, calling it "the warmest, most appealing she's made yet" and singling out "Double Sided Mirror" as "the best thing Cold Beat have done to date." Uncut also reviewed the album in print.

== Track listing ==
All lyrics written by Hannah Lew.

| No. | Title | Length |
|---|---|---|
| 1. | "Smoke" | 1:49 |
| 2. | "Prism" | 4:22 |
| 3. | "Paper" | 3:28 |
| 4. | "Pearls" | 5:45 |
| 5. | "Gloves" | 3:29 |
| 6. | "Through" | 4:00 |
| 7. | "Double Sided Mirror" | 4:07 |
| 8. | "Mother" | 2:35 |
| 9. | "Crimes" | 3:17 |
| 10. | "Flat Earth" | 2:39 |
| Total length: | | 35:25 |

== Personnel ==
Credits adapted from the album's liner notes.

- Hannah Lew – lead vocals, bass, synthesizers
- Kyle King – guitar, synthesizer
- Sean Monaghan – guitar, synthesizer
- Luciano Talpini Aita – drums, synthesizer
- Mikey Young – mixing
- Joe Lambert – mastering
