= Over Me =

Over Me may refer to:

- Over Me (album), an album by Cold Beat
- "Over Me", a song by Charlotte Cardin from the album, Phoenix
- "Over Me", a song by New Found Glory from the album, Coming Home
