= Scribble Mural Comic Journal =

Studio album by A Sunny Day in Glasgow
- Released: February 13, 2007
- Recorded: January – August 2006
- Studio: Ben Daniels' apartment (West Philadelphia, Pennsylvania); Daniels residences (Abington, Pennsylvania)
- Genre: Dream pop; shoegaze
- Length: 54:03
- Label: Notenuf
- Producer: A Sunny Day in Glasgow

A Sunny Day in Glasgow chronology
The Sunniest Day Ever (2006)	Scribble Mural Comic Journal (2007)	Tout New Age (2007)

Scribble Mural Comic Journal is the debut studio album by American indie rock band A Sunny Day in Glasgow. It was released on February 13, 2007 by Notenuf Records. Ruined Potential Records reissued the album on LP on August 5, 2008.

== Background and recording ==
Scribble Mural Comic Journal was recorded from January to August 2006 by A Sunny Day in Glasgow, at the time consisting of siblings Ben, Lauren and Robin Daniels. It was recorded at Ben Daniels' apartment in West Philadelphia and the Daniels siblings' parents' houses in Abington. The album also incorporates sounds recorded in the streets of London in 2005.

The Scribble Mural Comic Journal tracks "The Best Summer Ever", "C'mon" and "A Mundane Phone Call to Jack Parsons" were first released as the opening three tracks on A Sunny Day in Glasgow's 2006 debut EP The Sunniest Day Ever.

Several outtakes from Scribble Mural Comic Journal were later released on the band's 2007 EP Tout New Age.

== Music ==
Jeremy D. Larson of Pitchfork wrote: "Scribble Mural Comic Journal is the sound of an email with the subject line 'FWD: FWD: FWD: FWD: dream pop.' It’s a slightly radical, distorted definition of it, one beyond chiming 4AD guitars and gossamer vocals, disassembled and rearranged in a space somewhere between a parasomnia hallucination and a club at the bottom of a lake."

== Critical reception ==
Professional ratings
Review scores
Source	Rating
AllMusic	4/5 stars
Drowned in Sound	9/10
Pitchfork	8.0/10
The Skinny	4/5 stars
Stylus Magazine	B+

In 2018, Pitchfork ranked Scribble Mural Comic Journal at number 30 on its list of the best dream pop albums. "A song like 'Lists, Plans' could scatter away into the night, but it’s this formlessness, this broken-mirror sound that speaks to their rightful place in the dream pop canon."

== Track listing ==
All tracks are written by Ben Daniels.

No.	Title	Length
1.	"Wake Up Pretty"	1:59
2.	"No. 6 Von Karman Street"	4:15
3.	"A Mundane Phonecall to Jack Parsons"	3:21
4.	"Our Change into Rain Is No Change at All (Talkin' 'Bout Us)"	4:24
5.	"Ghost in the Graveyard"	5:59
6.	"5:15 Train"	4:12
7.	"Lists, Plans"	4:54
8.	"C'mon"	4:27
9.	"The Horn Song"	1:28
10.	"Panic Attacks Are What Make Me 'Me'"	5:15
11.	"Watery (Drowning Is Just Another Word for Being Buried Alive Under Water)"	4:01
12.	"Things Only I Can See"	5:05
13.	"The Best Summer Ever"	4:43
Total length:		54:03

2008 Ruined Potential reissue bonus tracks
No.	Title	Length
14.	"Ghost in the Graveyard" (Ulrich Schnauss remix)	4:19
15.	"Summerlong Silences" (Asobi Seksu remix)	4:40
Total length:		63:02

== Personnel ==
Credits are adapted from the album's liner notes.

A Sunny Day in Glasgow

- Ben Daniels
- Lauren Daniels
- Robin Daniels

Additional musicians

- Jody Hamilton – horns
- Steve Heise – banjo
- The Merds – additional vocals on "No. 6 Von Karman Street"

Production

- A Sunny Day in Glasgow – production, mixing, recording
- Dan Swift – mastering

Design

- Naomi Donabedian – design
- Ever Nalens – artwork
