= Cosmic Logic =

Studio album by Peaking Lights
- Released: October 7, 2014
- Genre: Synth-pop
- Length: 46:27
- Labels: Weird World; Domino
- Producer: Matt Thornley

Peaking Lights chronology
Lucifer (2012)	Cosmic Logic (2014)	The Fifth State of Consciousness (2017)

Singles from Cosmic Logic
- 1. "Breakdown" Released: August 18, 2014; 2. "Everyone and Us" Released: September 17, 2014

Cosmic Logic is the fourth studio album by California-based psychedelic pop duo Peaking Lights. It was released on October 7, 2014, via Weird World and Domino Recording Company, in LP, CD and digital formats.

The album, incorporating elements of experimental rock, dancehall and Afrobeat, was produced by former LCD Soundsystem guitarist Matt Thornley. "Breakdown" was released as the lead single on August 18, 2014, alongside a music video directed by Eugene Kotlyarenko. It was followed by the second single, "Everyone and Us", on September 17, 2014.

== Reception ==
Professional ratings
Review scores
Source	Rating
Clash	6/10
DIY	4/5 stars
Exclaim!	9/10
Irish Times	4/5 stars
Louder Than War	9/10
MusicOMH	4/5 stars
NME	4/5 stars
Pitchfork	6.5/10
Rolling Stone	3/5 stars
The Skinny	2/5 stars

AllMusic's Fred Thomas remarked, "Peaking Lights simply push for greater clarity and articulation on Cosmic Logic, refining their approach but keeping the blurry balance of rhythm and sun-dazed psychedelia."

Writing for Beat, the Sideman referred to the album as "a collection of short, spacey but not spaced-out psychedelic pop songs marks a significant change in direction for the Californian-based husband/wife duo." The album received a rating of six from Clash, whose reviewer Kim Hillyard noted it as "an entirely new trip" with "less ayahuasca haze, more intergalactic kitsch", "minimal metallic worms replace the fuzzy sunbeams," and "odd popping analogue synthesizers cut tropical disco shards."

Consequence's Sasha Geffen called Cosmic Logic "by far the most concrete work Peaking Lights have laid to tape, and at points it can hammer down too bluntly," noting its "dub-inflected synthpop" style. In a four-star review for DIY, Jamie Milton observed that the album is "rigid" and "sharp in delivery," stating "There's a density to these songs, too. It's not just a band speeding up the tempo and following the odd rule – their songwriting's become more complex." Scott Simpson, in his review for Exclaim!, noted the album's "all supremely catchy melodies, simple and almost spoken-word lyricism and constant use of repetition," rating it nine out of ten. Chris Jones of the Irish Times assigned the album a rating of four stars and commented, "on Cosmic Logic they've taken a scalpel to their sound."

It was described as "a collection of tracks stuffed with bang-on-trend, four-on-the-floor beats buried beneath squelching bass and faraway vocals" by Luke Cartledge of the Line of Best Fit. Reviewing for Louder Than War, Paul Scott-Bates called the album "yet another auditory delight," opining that "the trademark oriental sound and influences are still present and lyrically it maybe leaves something to be desired." Christopher Monk of MusicOMH referred to songs on the album as "strong and as instantly appealing", commenting "Lucifer's fans might bemoan the band's decision not to explore further the crossover between dub, indie rock and synth pop."

The album was rated four stars by NME's Rhian Daly who called it "tighter than anything they've recorded previously" and "a great return and a slick change of direction." In a 6.5-rated review for Pitchfork, Stuart Berman remarked, "from a sonic standpoint at least, Cosmic Logic is a triumph, retaining the heady allure of the band's earlier records but infusing it with enough rhythmic intricacy and fidgety energy to warrant a band-name change to Tweaking Lights." Assigning it a rating of seven, PopMatters' Colin Fitzgerald opined, "On Cosmic Logic, the band's glittery electronic aesthetics and hypnotic drum machine rhythms remain, but the songs are stripped of the dense atmospherics and ambling structures of previous efforts."

Commenting "On their fourth album, the pair explore the more lysergic parts of our world through gossamer electronica, buoyant vocal effects and metaphysical grooves", Paula Mejía of Rolling Stone gave it a rating of four stars. In a two-star review for the Skinny, Gary Kaill noted, "Cosmic Logic demonstrates its craft via studio smarts rather than deep song craft." Anthony Carew of the Sydney Morning Herald observed, "Cosmic Logic, their fourth, has plenty of spacey lyrics and trailing echo, but its melodies are bold and its production brilliant; the LP playing like Peaking Lights' bona fide breakout."

== Track listing ==
Cosmic Logic track listing
No.	Title	Length
1.	"Infinite Trips"	3:06
2.	"Telephone Call"	4:04
3.	"Hypnotic Hustle"	4:22
4.	"Everyone and Us"	3:44
5.	"Little Light"	4:17
6.	"Dreamquest"	3:47
7.	"Eyes to Sea"	3:54
8.	"Bad with the Good"	4:28
9.	"New Grrrls"	4:46
10.	"Breakdown"	4:37
11.	"Tell Me Your Song"	4:42
Total length:		46:27

== Personnel ==
Credits adapted from AllMusic.

- Aaron Coyes – bass, engineer, guitar, noise, piano, producer, programming, synthesizer, tapes
- Be Hussey – assistant
- Drew Fischer – assistant
- Indra Dunis – drums, piano, synthesizer, vocals
- Matt Thornley – mixing, vocal engineer
- Rob Carmichael – design, illustrations
- Shawn Reed – illustrations
- Simon Davey – mastering
