= Tout New Age =

EP by A Sunny Day in Glasgow
- Released: July 10, 2007
- Recorded: 2006 & 2007
- Genre: Pop, Shoegaze, Ambient, Indie
- Length: 31:12
- Label: Notenuf ntnf007
- Producer: A Sunny Day in Glasgow

A Sunny Day in Glasgow chronology
Scribble Mural Comic Journal (2007)	Tout New Age (2007)	Ashes Grammar (2009)

Professional ratings
Review scores
Source	Rating
Drowned in Sound	(8/10)

Tout New Age is a collection of outtakes from A Sunny Day in Glasgow's debut album, Scribble Mural Comic Journal. The band originally released it as a tour-only CD in 2007 and then released it in July 2007 as a digital download EP.

== Track listing ==
All songs by A Sunny Day in Glasgow

1. "They Made My Baby Care About Things That Didn't Matter" – 5:41
2. "Laughter (Victims)" – 1:57
3. "Summerlong Silences" – 3:08
4. "The Ossifrage (Tout New Age)" – 3:12
5. "Take Care of Yourself (Our Next Breath Will Be Our Last)" – 3:03
6. "Yellow" – 4:54
7. "Shame, Who Wouldn't Think It's Evil (Let's Get Beat Up)" – 5:28
8. "Hugs & Kisses (Theme From A Sunny Day in Glasgow)" – 3:49

== Personnel ==
- Robin Daniels
- Lauren Daniels
- Ben Daniels
- Jody Hamilton - horns
- Jeddidiah Smith - mastering
