= Chaos by Invitation =

Studio album by Cold Beat
- Released: April 7, 2017
- Recorded: 2016–2017
- Studios: El Studio, San Francisco
- Genres: Synth-pop; post-punk; new wave
- Length: 33:38
- Label: Crime On The Moon
- Producers: Phil Manley; Mikey Young; Hannah Lew

Cold Beat chronology
Into the Air (2015)	Chaos by Invitation (2017)	Live Studio Recordings (2017)

Chaos by Invitation is the third studio album by the American synth-pop band Cold Beat, the project of San Francisco musician Hannah Lew. It was released on April 7, 2017, on Lew's own label, Crime On The Moon. Marking a shift toward a more electronic, synthesizer-driven sound than the band's earlier guitar-based post-punk, the album was written and largely recorded by Lew on her own before additional contributions from collaborators.

The album was preceded by the lead single "62 Moons", which premiered through NPR's All Songs Considered in February 2017. Critics generally received the album favorably, with Under the Radar describing it as the band's strongest release to that point.

== Background and recording ==
Cold Beat is the project of Hannah Lew, who had previously been the bassist of the San Francisco post-punk trio Grass Widow. Lew began performing as Cold Beat in 2013 and released the band's debut album, Over Me, in 2014, followed by Into the Air in 2015.

Chaos by Invitation was written and recorded primarily by Lew on her own. Initial tracking was done by Phil Manley, of the band Trans Am, at El Studio in San Francisco; when Manley became unavailable to complete the project, Lew finished the recording at home and with the Australian musician Mikey Young, of Total Control, who also handled additional arrangement, mixing, and mastering. The sessions also featured contributions from Kyle King, Jackson Blumgart, and Alex Shen.

In interviews, Lew connected the album's themes to astronomy and to the writing of Ursula K. Le Guin, and described the title as reflecting a sense of personal accountability for disorder in one's own life. The cover artwork, created by Kevin McCarthy of the band Rank Xerox, was designed to be machine readable.

== "62 Moons" ==
The album's lead single, "62 Moons", was released on February 8, 2017, premiering through NPR's All Songs Considered. One of the few guitar-led tracks on the album, the song was described by NPR's Lars Gotrich as a piece of "dreamy synth-pop." Lew explained that the song concerns love taken for granted, drawing an analogy to the 62 moons then attributed to the planet Saturn, orbiting it in constant motion. The number reflected the count of Saturn's known moons at the time of writing.

The single was also premiered by Stereogum, which praised the song's "striking payoff," and by the music site BrooklynVegan. In its review of the album, Under the Radar singled out "62 Moons" as a highlight.

== Critical reception ==
Chaos by Invitation received generally favorable reviews. Writing for FLOOD, Cameron Crowell rated the album seven out of ten and compared its sound to that of New Order and Modern English. Matthew Berlyant of Under the Radar praised the record, drawing comparisons to Gary Numan, Wire, and Frankie Rose, and called it the best Cold Beat album to date.

In an interview feature for Bandcamp Daily, Allison Hussey wrote that the album's songs took time to settle in and stretch out. The Canadian publication The Revue described it as the band's "most focused" and personal record to that point. The Portland magazine Eleven noted that the band had never sounded so electronic.

== Track listing ==
All tracks written by Hannah Lew.

No.	Title	Length
1.	"In Motion"	5:49
2.	"Thin Ice"	2:50
3.	"Don't Touch"	2:58
4.	"Black Licorice"	3:35
5.	"UDW"	0:43
6.	"62 Moons"	3:58
7.	"False Alarm"	4:21
8.	"Chainmaille"	2:32
9.	"Ivory Tower"	2:48
10.	"Strawberry Moon"	2:15
11.	"In Motion Reprise"	1:45
Total length:		33:38

== Personnel ==
Credits adapted from the album's liner notes.

- Hannah Lew – bass, vocals, synthesizers, percussion
- Kyle King – guitar, synthesizer, piano
- Jackson Blumgart – guitar, percussion, synthesizer
- Alex Shen – drums
- Mikey Young – additional instrumentation, arrangement, mixing, mastering
- Phil Manley – recording engineer
- Kevin McCarthy – cover art
- Sean Hewitt – layout
