= Ashes Grammar =

Studio album by A Sunny Day in Glasgow
- Released: September 15, 2009
- Recorded: September – December 2008
- Studio: Downtown Performing Arts Center (Lambertville, New Jersey)
- Genre: Dream pop; shoegaze
- Length: 63:08
- Label: Mis Ojos Discos

A Sunny Day in Glasgow chronology
| Tout New Age (2007) | Ashes Grammar (2009) | Nitetime Rainbows (2010) |

Singles from Ashes Grammar
- 1. "Shy" Released: November 10, 2009

Ashes Grammar is the second studio album by American indie rock band A Sunny Day in Glasgow. It was released on September 15, 2009, by Mis Ojos Discos.

== Background and recording ==
Following a successful European tour, A Sunny Day in Glasgow's Ben Daniels began preparations for the recording of the band's next album. He rented a large dance studio space within the Downtown Performing Arts Center in Lambertville, which became the primary location for recording. He and bandmate Josh Meakim then began experimenting with sounds and setting up microphones in the space. Prior to the start of formal work on the album, however, three members of A Sunny Day in Glasgow departed the band under varying circumstances: Brice Hickey, who had "very seriously" broken his legs in an accident while loading equipment into his car on the day that recording was set to begin; Lauren Daniels, who left in order to care for Hickey, her then-boyfriend; and Robin Daniels, who wished to pursue her graduate studies. The band was subsequently reduced to Ben Daniels and Josh Meakim. Annie Fredrickson was later invited to join A Sunny Day in Glasgow on the recommendation of a fan of the band who was familiar to Ben Daniels "from shows", after Daniels asked the fan whether he knew any vocalists. The trio of Daniels, Meakim and Fredrickson helmed the album's recording.

Ashes Grammar was recorded from September to December 2008. The expansiveness of the dance studio space allowed Ben Daniels the freedom to experiment with different acoustics. He has cited Alvin Lucier's I Am Sitting in a Room as an influence on the recording process. As Lauren and Robin Daniels, the lead singers on earlier A Sunny Day in Glasgow recordings, had left the band, vocal duties on Ashes Grammar were shared by Fredrickson and Meakim. Fredrickson's friend Beverly Science performed additional vocals on the album. Mich White, who was previously a touring bassist for A Sunny Day in Glasgow, also "contributed ideas" from his home in Austin.

== Critical reception ==
Professional ratings
Aggregate scores
| Source | Rating |
|---|---|
| AnyDecentMusic? | 6.9/10 |
| Metacritic | 77/100 |
Review scores
| Source | Rating |
| AllMusic | 4/5 stars |
| Drowned in Sound | 8/10 |
| NME | 5/10 |
| Pitchfork | 8.3/10 |
| PopMatters | 6/10 |
| The Skinny | 4/5 stars |
| Tiny Mix Tapes | 4.5/5 |

In 2016, Pitchfork ranked Ashes Grammar at number 35 on its list of the best shoegaze albums of all time.

== Track listing ==
All tracks are written by Ben Daniels, except where noted.

| No. | Title | Writer(s) | Length |
|---|---|---|---|
| 1. | "Magna for Annie, Josh, and Robin" | | 0:10 |
| 2. | "Secrets at the Prom" | | 0:42 |
| 3. | "Slaughter Killing Carnage (The Meaning of Words)" | | 2:12 |
| 4. | "Failure" | Daniels; Josh Meakim | 3:30 |
| 5. | "Curse Words" | Daniels; Annie Fredrickson; Meakim | 1:43 |
| 6. | "Close Chorus" | | 6:24 |
| 7. | "Shy" | | 5:43 |
| 8. | "Lights" | | 0:22 |
| 9. | "Passionate Introverts (Dinosaurs)" | Daniels; Fredrickson | 4:31 |
| 10. | "West Philly Vocoder" | | 2:05 |
| 11. | "Evil, with Evil, Against Evil" | | 2:30 |
| 12. | "The White Witch" | Daniels; Meakim | 3:51 |
| 13. | "Nitetime Rainbows" | Daniels; Meakim | 5:31 |
| 14. | "Canalfish" | Daniels; Fredrickson | 1:30 |
| 15. | "Loudly" | Daniels; Fredrickson | 1:51 |
| 16. | "Blood White" | | 4:20 |
| 17. | "Ashes Grammar" | | 1:11 |
| 18. | "Ashes Maths" | | 3:23 |
| 19. | "Miss My Friends" | | 1:30 |
| 20. | "Starting at a Disadvantage" | | 4:41 |
| 21. | "Life's Great" | | 0:41 |
| 22. | "Headphone Space" | | 4:47 |
| Total length: | | | 63:08 |

Notes

- The track order for the LP edition repositions "Blood White" between "Passionate Introverts (Dinosaurs)" and "West Philly Vocoder".

== Personnel ==
Credits are adapted from the album's liner notes.

A Sunny Day in Glasgow

- Ben Daniels
- Robin Daniels
- Annie Fredrickson
- Brice Hickey
- Josh Meakim
- Beverly Science
- Mich White

Additional musicians

- Jody Hamilton – horns on "Failure" and "Close Chorus"
- Ryan Mitchell – theremin on "Curse Words"
- Chuck Nicholson – vibraphone on "Nitetime Rainbows"

Production

- Matt Coogan – mastering
- Ben Daniels – mixing
- Tom Kee – mastering
- Josh Meakim – mixing, recording

Design

- Naomi Donabedian – layout
- Jaakko Mattila – artwork
