= 936 (album) =

Studio album by Peaking Lights
- Released: February 8, 2011
- Recorded: June 6–8, 2010 at Flat Black Studios in Iowa City, Iowa
- Genres: Neo-psychedelia, dub
- Length: 48:53 (CD)
- Labels: Not Not Fun (US), Weird World (UK)
- Producers: Aaron Coyes, Indra Dunis

Peaking Lights chronology
Imaginary Falcons (2009)	936 (2011)	Lucifer (2012)

936 is a 2011 neo-psychedelic album by Peaking Lights, a Spring Green, Wisconsin-based husband-and-wife duo of Aaron Coyes and Indra Dunis. Peaking Lights stepped outside of the lo-fi style of their previous recordings, recording in a studio for the first time, and infused their psychedelic pop style with sounds from dub and hypnagogic chillwave.

936 became independent label Not Not Fun's best-selling release, and was consequently picked up for UK release by Weird World. The album garnered critical acclaim, and was identified as one of the best underground releases of 2011.

== Recording and musical content ==
Peaking Lights' previous album, Imaginary Falcons, was noisy, psychedelic jamming recorded by Coyes and Dunis at home. The direction of 936's production was influenced by the band's performance at the KRAAK Festival in 2010. The quality of sound equipment at the festival allowed the band to hear their own music in a different way at a time than their earlier lo-fi recordings. Three songs from 936 had been written by that time. According to Dunis, "When we had the opportunity to listen to it more spread out, and with a higher fidelity, we thought this is actually how we’d like our record to sound."

936 was recorded over the course of three days at Flat Back Studios; it was the band's first recording session in a studio. Coyes said that access to the higher fidelity equipment was more significant than any change in songwriting, while Dunis said that she wrote more conventionally melodic vocal lines than she had done before. Although Dunis played the album's percussion, Coyes wrote the rhythms, and said "I tried to write rhythms that would clash with each other but still work, so on this record I tried to go deeper into that idea."

936 is a psychedelic album that draws heavily from the style of dub. Other genres that critics have cited as sonic reference points include improvisational krautrock, 1960s soul, techno, and post-punk. A critic from Playground said "each and every one of the tracks has been constructed from cavernous basslines and rhythm boxes, over which more poppy aspects, like the dispassionate yet emotive voice of singer Indra Dunis, Morricone-like guitars ... and cosmic synths are laid." The sound of 936 has been compared to reggae artists like King Tubby, Lee "Scratch" Perry, Augustus Pablo; alternative groups like Young Marble Giants and Primal Scream; and contemporaries like Sun Araw, Pocahaunted, Excepter, and Eternal Tapestry. Coyes acknowledged that the band is inspired by old sounds but approaches these influences from an experimental rather than nostalgic attitude. The lyrics contain numerous references to spirituality and nature, inspired by Coyes's and Dunis's upbringings.

== Release ==
The album title was chosen for the numerological significance it holds for Coyes and Dunis. Through a combination of critical appraisal and word-of-mouth, the album attracted an unexpected level of attention. With about 3,000 copies sold as of March 2012, 936 became Not Not Fun's best-selling release.

The album's relative success drew attention from larger indie labels looking to rerelease the album. At the time, Coyes and Dunis made a living through a store that sold vintage clothing and records. The album was released on November 21 in the UK and Europe through Weird World, an imprint of Domino. To promote the rerelease, the band embarked on a tour of the UK and Amsterdam, streamed music on the website 936.fm, and commissioned remixes of songs from 936. Peaking Lights announced that they would release their next album on Mexican Summer in the US and Weird World in Europe. In 2013, Peaking Lights announced that they had founded their own label, Two Flowers, and that their first release would be a new pressing of 936.

== Reception ==
Professional ratings
Aggregate scores
Source	Rating
AnyDecentMusic?	7.5/10
Metacritic	76/100
Review scores
Source	Rating
AllMusic	4/5 stars
The A.V. Club	A
DIY	8/10
The Irish Times	3/5 stars
Mixmag	8/10
Mojo	4/5 stars
NME	6/10
Pitchfork	7.7/10
Q	3/5 stars
Uncut	4/5 stars

Upon release, 936 was generally well received by both American and UK critics.

A writer from indie blog Gorilla vs. Bear said the album "emerged seemingly out of nowhere to become one of the year's most compelling and replayable jams." Sam Bloch of LA Weekly called the album "a game-changer. At that time, so-called chillwavers were achieving popularity by washing facile pop melodies in baths of haze and echo. The mellow, dubbier stuff of Peaking Lights was a refreshing alternative." Pitchfork named 936 one of the most overlooked albums of the year and said it exemplified the neglected creativity of a new wave of Midwestern musicians. Fact, The Wire, and About.com also included the album in year-end lists.

== Track listing ==
All songs written by Peaking Lights.

CD/Cassette

1. "Synthy" 2:58
2. "All the Sun That Shines" – 6:53
3. "Amazing and Wonderful" – 5:29
4. "Birds of Paradise (Dub Version)" – 7:57
5. "Hey Sparrow" – 3:56
6. "Tiger Eyes (Laid Back)" – 7:47
7. "Marshmellow Yellow" – 8:27
8. "Summertime" – 5:26

Vinyl
A1 "All the Sun That Shines" – 6:53
A2 "Amazing and Wonderful" – 5:29
A3 "Birds of Paradise (Dub Version)" – 7:57
B1 "Hey Sparrow" – 3:56
B2 "Tiger Eyes (Laid Back)" – 7:47
B3 "Marshmellow Yellow" – 8:27

Weird World vinyl issue: Bonus CD

1. "Amazing and Wonderful" (Cadenza Remix)
2. "Hey Sparrow" (d'Eon Remix)
3. "Birds of Paradise" (Maria Minerva's Ooh and Ah Edit)
4. "Amazing and Wonderful" (Sunless '9 Remix)
5. "All the Sun That Shines" (Doldrums Remix)
6. "Amazing and Wonderful" (Damu Remix)

== Personnel ==
- Aaron Coyes – guitar, bass, drum programming, tape, synth, effects, production
- Indra Dunis – vocals, keyboards, synth, drums, drum Programming, effects, production
- Luke Tweedy – engineer, recording
