= Songs (Deptford Goth album) =

Studio album by Deptford Goth
- Released: 3 November 2014

Professional ratings
Aggregate scores
Source	Rating
Metacritic	77/100
Review scores
Source	Rating
Allmusic	3.5/5 stars
Clash	6/10
Consequence of Sound	B
DIY	4/5 stars
Drowned in Sound	7/10
musicOMH	4/5 stars
The Observer	4/5 stars
Pitchfork Media	6.8/10
The Skinny	3/5 stars
Under the Radar	7/10 stars

Songs is an album by Deptford Goth.

== Track listing ==
No.	Title	Length
1.	"Relics"	3:57
2.	"Do Exist"	3:57
3.	"The Lovers"	3:28
4.	"We Symbolise"	4:49
5.	"Code"	3:19
6.	"The Loop"	3:33
7.	"A Circle"	3:41
8.	"Near to a River"	4:42
9.	"Dust"	1:50
10.	"Two Hearts"	3:55
11.	"A Shelter, a Weapon"	4:26
Total length:		40:37
