= Sea When Absent =

Studio album by A Sunny Day in Glasgow
- Released: June 24, 2014
- Studio: Uniform (Philadelphia, Pennsylvania); Fantastic Imagination (Philadelphia); Jen Goma's apartment (Brooklyn, New York); Oxford Christmas Rat (Sydney)
- Genre: Dream pop; psychedelic pop; shoegaze
- Length: 47:13
- Label: Lefse

A Sunny Day in Glasgow chronology
Autumn, Again (2010)	Sea When Absent (2014)

Singles from Sea When Absent
- 1. "In Love with Useless (The Timeless Geometry in the Tradition of Passing)" Released: January 6, 2014

Sea When Absent is the fourth studio album by American indie rock band A Sunny Day in Glasgow. It was released on June 24, 2014 by Lefse Records.

The recording of Sea When Absent was financed through the crowdfunding platform Kickstarter. The album could be streamed through Pitchfork's Advance service from June 16 to June 23, 2014.

== Recording ==
While it was widely reported that the members of A Sunny Day in Glasgow were never in the same room while making Sea When Absent, the band has clarified that this was not the case. Band member Ben Daniels said: "I think that's an angle that's kind of over-played, because for most of the recording we were all definitely in the same room. We live in different cities, but we would meet up in Philadelphia to go to the studio together. Then we'd go back to where we lived, and keep working on it, so there was a little bit of both."

== Critical reception ==
Professional ratings
Aggregate scores
Source	Rating
AnyDecentMusic?	8.0/10
Metacritic	82/100
Review scores
Source	Rating
AllMusic	4/5 stars
DIY	4/5 stars
Drowned in Sound	8/10
Exclaim!	9/10
The Guardian	4/5 stars
NME	8/10
Pitchfork	8.5/10
PopMatters	7/10
Slant Magazine	3.5/5 stars
Under the Radar	8/10

Pitchfork accorded Sea When Absent a "Best New Music" designation; reviewer Lindsay Zoladz found that A Sunny Day in Glasgow had produced a more sonically abrasive work than their previous releases, "but without abandoning the ambiance that makes them so distinct."

== Track listing ==
No.	Title	Writer(s)	Length
1.	"Bye Bye, Big Ocean (The End)"	Ben Daniels; Annie Fredrickson; Jen Goma	4:17
2.	"In Love with Useless (The Timeless Geometry in the Tradition of Passing)"	Daniels; Goma; Fredrickson; Ryan Newmyer; Josh Meakim; Adam Herndon	5:08
3.	"Crushin'"	Daniels; Goma; Newmyer	4:44
4.	"MTLOV (Minor Keys)"	Daniels; Goma; Newmyer	4:09
5.	"The Things They Do to Me"	Daniels; Goma; Meakim	5:07
6.	"Boys Turn into Girls (Initiation Rites)"	Daniels; Meakim	5:06
7.	"Never Nothing (It's Alright [It's Ok])"	Daniels; Goma; Meakim	5:06
8.	"Double Dutch"	Daniels	1:33
9.	"The Body, It Bends (ペルセポネが帰ってきた!)"	Daniels; Fredrickson; Goma; Meakim	3:45
10.	"Oh, I'm a Wrecker (What to Say to Crazy People)"	Daniels; Goma; Newmyer	4:08
11.	"Golden Waves"	Daniels; Fredrickson; Goma	4:10
Total length:			47:13

== Personnel ==
Credits are adapted from the album's liner notes.

A Sunny Day in Glasgow

- Ben Daniels
- Annie Fredrickson
- Jen Goma
- Adam Herndon
- Josh Meakim
- Ryan Newmyer

Additional musicians

- David Kain – trumpet
- Joseph Kille – violin
- St. Spanky's Children's Choir for the Deaf – choir vocals

Production

- Ben Daniels – mixing, additional recording
- Jen Goma – additional mixing and recording
- Thomas Kee – mastering
- Josh Meakim – additional mixing and recording
- Jeff Zeigler – recording, additional mixing

Design

- Ben Daniels – photography
- Sabrina Franz – photography
- Annie Fredrickson – photography
- Adam Herndon – design, layout
- Ever Nalens – photography
- James Rickman – photography
- Corey Jacob Williams – photography

== Charts ==
Chart (2014)	Peak position
UK Independent Albums (OCC)	42
US Heatseekers Albums (Billboard)	12
