= Beverly (band) =

American pop rock band

- Origin: Brooklyn, New York
- Genres: Indie rock; indie pop
- Years active: 2013–present
- Labels: Kanine Records
- Members: Drew Citron; Scott Rosenthal
- Past members: Frankie Rose

Beverly is a Brooklyn-based American pop rock band that formed in 2013. They began recording their debut LP, Careers, in 2013 and finished in early 2014. It was released on July 1, 2014, on Williamsburg-based Kanine Records.

Beverly's original lineup consisted of Frankie Rose and Drew Citron, both from the Brooklyn indie music scene. Rose is a former member of Crystal Stilts, Vivian Girls, and Dum Dum Girls, while Citron is a former member of Avan Lava. They released their first single, "Honey Do", on Gorilla vs. Bear on February 10, 2014, and it was quickly picked up by other notable music blogs such as Pitchfork Media. The track was featured on Kanine Records' Record Store Day compilation Non Violent Femmes.

== Discography ==
- Careers (2014)
- The Blue Swell (2016)
