= Careers (album) =

2014 studio album by Beverly

Studio album by Beverly
- Released: July 1, 2014
- Genres: Indie rock, noise pop
- Length: 29:18
- Labels: Kanine Records, That Summer Feeling

Professional ratings
Aggregate scores
Source	Rating
Metacritic	73/100
Review scores
Source	Rating
AllMusic	3.5/5 stars
Exclaim!	(8/10)
NME	(7/10)
PopMatters	(7/10)

Careers is the debut studio album by American duo Beverly. It was released July 1, 2014 on LP / CD by Kanine Records and cassette by That Summer Feeling.

== Track listing ==
No.	Title	Length
1.	"Madora"	2:35
2.	"Honey Do"	3:08
3.	"Planet Birthday"	3:12
4.	"All the Things"	2:58
5.	"Yale's Life"	3:10
6.	"Ambular"	2:20
7.	"Out on a Ride"	2:08
8.	"Hong Kong Hotel"	2:54
9.	"You Can't Get It Right"	3:03
10.	"Black and Grey"	3:50
