= Lone (album) =

Live album by Ai Aso
- Released: 31 March 2014
- Recorded: 3 November 2012
- Venues: Daikanyama Unit (Tokyo, Japan)
- Genre: Folk
- Length: 33:53
- Label: Ideologic Organ

Ai Aso chronology
Aida (2009)	Lone (2014)	The Faintest Hint (2020)

Lone is a live album by Japanese musician Ai Aso. It was released on 31 March 2014 through Ideologic Organ.

== Background ==
Ai Aso is a Japanese musician who previously collaborated with Boris. Lone is her first album in five years, following Aida (2009). The album was recorded live in front of hundreds of audiences at Daikanyama Unit, Tokyo, on 3 November 2012, when she opened for Boris, Sunn O))), and Chelsea Wolfe. It consists of seven tracks and features her performing solo on vocals, guitar, and keyboards. It clocks in at 34 minutes.

The album was released on 31 March 2014 through Stephen O'Malley's Ideologic Organ, a subsidiary record label of Editions Mego.

== Critical reception ==
Professional ratings
Review scores
Source	Rating
Fact	4/5 stars
Spectrum Culture	3.0/5
Tiny Mix Tapes	4/5 stars

Maya Kalev of Fact wrote, "Her solo music, such as 2004's Lavender Edition LP, has always been fragile and spellbinding, but none so far has delved quite as deeply into solitude as Lone." She added, "At the time of recording these intimate songs may have been a prelude to heavier music, but as a standalone album Lone wields its own subtle power." Ben Rafliff of The New York Times stated, "the music feels decelerated to about two-thirds of the tempo it should be: not a dramatic and obvious act of resistance, but just slower than you expect, and more mysterious for that."

=== Accolades ===
Year-end lists for Lone
Publication	List	Rank	Ref.
Tiny Mix Tapes	Favorite 50 Music Releases of 2014	47	

== Track listing ==
Lone track listing
No.	Title	Length
1.	"Agenda"	4:32
2.	"Kamitsure no Ookina Mizutamari"	4:34
3.	"Most Children Do"	3:52
4.	"Date"	3:01
5.	"Colchicum"	3:54
6.	"Komish..."	6:53
7.	"Land"	7:05
Total length:		33:53

== Personnel ==
Credits adapted from liner notes.

- Ai Aso – vocals, guitar, keyboards
- Takashi Itoga – engineering, recording
- Soichiro Nakamura – mastering
- CGB – vinyl cut
- Miki Matsushima – portrait photography
