= The Fifth State of Consciousness =

Studio album by Peaking Lights
- Released: June 16, 2017
- Recorded: 2015–17
- Studios: Dreamfuzz Studio, Los Angeles, California
- Genres: Psychedelic pop; experimental; synth-pop
- Length: 72:34
- Label: Two Flowers
- Producer: Aaron Coyes

Peaking Lights chronology
Cosmic Logic (2014)	The Fifth State of Consciousness (2017)

Singles from The Fifth State of Consciousness
- 1. "Everytime I See The Light" Released: April 11, 2017; 2. "I'll Be In The Sky" Released: May 10, 2017; 3. "Love Can Move Mountains" Released: June 6, 2017; 4. "Coyote Ghost Melodies" Released: June 13, 2017

The Fifth State of Consciousness is a double album by husband-and-wife psychedelic pop duo Peaking Lights, consisting of Aaron Coyes and Indra Dunis. The making of the record differed from previous albums by the duo in that Coyes and Dunis had no involvement from other labels (the LP was released on a label formed by the duo named Two Flowers), they were in the studio together more often, and they were much more experimental with the music. The Fifth State of Consciousness's press release summarizes that the album is "a story of overcoming the shadow to rise above" with concepts of "dreams, loss of innocence, strength and seeking an enlightened state of being after trials and tribulations." An example of this theme on the LP is "Love Can Move Mountains," which was inspired by the duo's disappointment from the results of the 2016 United States presidential election. In general, professional critics wrote favorable reviews of The Fifth State of Consciousness upon its June 2017 release.

== Production and composition ==
The making of The Fifth State of Consciousness significantly differs from previous Peaking Lights albums. It was the first album by Peaking Lights where Aaron Coyes and Indra Dunis produced and funded a full-length LP on their own and without label involvement. As Coyes explained, "That’s cost us in some ways, and in other ways it hasn’t cost us, but what we’ve learned is you have to do things yourself, you have to learn how to record things yourself and for this record we decided we wanted to put it out ourself."

Peaking Lights produced the album as a slower rate so they could have more time to spend with their children. In addition, Coyes and Dunis were able to work together in the studio more than their previous album Cosmic Logic (2014), which Coyes favored: "The clarity in thought and being able to work together was super important and production wise was probably more important than any piece of gear or technique, we were vibing and that made the approach feel fresh." Recording of The Fifth State of Consciousness took place for two years at Peaking Lights' own Los Angeles studio named Dreamfuzz Studio, which was described by Coyes as consisting of "a lot of junk and crap, but we try and use that stuff in whatever way we can to make sounds that are different to what you can make on the computer."

As Matt Oliver Clash magazine categorized, The Fifth State of Consciousness mainly "covers new romanticism and keeps on the coattails of today’s synth pop with dayglo indie standards." The record is also much more experimental than Peaking Lights' previous albums, which the official press release of the album described the album as having a diverse and "magical" sound throughout: "Sonically the double album shifts through many states from beginning to end, resonating deep, like a drive thru foreign landscapes where you’re glued to the window as everything slowly changes around you." Oliver labeled Dunis' vocal performance as a "floating head swap of Lana Del Rey and Spalding Rockwell" and described the set of sounds produced by Coyes as "tropical[,] both of twinkling waters on pixel beaches and bone-dry tundra." As he analyzed, "The longer [the sounds] go on, Peaking Lights’ paradise becomes a slow release of quicksand suffocating the ‘80s motifs and kitsch semantics, suckering you in with easy listening propositions before turning the tides."

According to the press release, making the LP involved "using tape machines, writing melodies backwards then playing them in reverse, layering sound upon sound to create “pads”, literally breaking electronics to get sounds, and a strict motto of "anything goes, pure creativity"." The album was produced with a combination of Pro Tools and various analog equipment such as "cheap battery powered mics," a 1976 Soundcraft Series Two mixing console, an Otari MTR-12 tape machine, and a Yamaha four-track cassette recorder. Coyes bought the Series Two mixer in 2016 for $100 in a deal. As he said, "It was a really crazy find. The guy had an ad up with really shitty pictures that said make me an offer."

== Concept ==
As the official press release states, The Fifth State of Consciousness is conceptually "a story of overcoming the shadow to rise above," dealing with themes of "dreams, loss of innocence, strength and seeking an enlightened state of being after trials and tribulations." AllMusic journalist Paul Simpson wrote The Fifth State of Consciousness "generally feels easygoing yet energetic, and informed of the state of the world while trying to achieve inner peace and enjoy life to the fullest." One of the tracks made for The Fifth State of Consciousness was initially titled “Thinking Out Loud." The track was originally not going to be on the final album since, in Coyes' words, the duo "never felt it was right." However, the duo's sadness from the results of the 2016 United States presidential election influenced them to keep working on the track and make it about blue aliens trying to overthrow an "orange creature" leading them. The name of the song was also changed to "Love Can Move Mountains."

== Critical reception ==
Professional ratings
Aggregate scores
Source	Rating
AnyDecentMusic?	6.4/10
Metacritic	75/100
Review scores
Source	Rating
AllMusic	4/5 stars
Clash	5/10
Drowned in Sound	8/10
The Irish Times	3/5 stars
Loud and Quiet	6/10
Mojo	3/5 stars
Pitchfork	7.6/10
Q	4/5 stars
Under the Radar	7/10 stars

Under the Radar claimed that with The Fifth State of Consciousness, "Peaking Lights continue to advance their sound by blurring genre lines and this time found a winning combination of hypnotic reggae beats, airy synths, and semi R&B grooves." Irish music journalist Jim Carroll opined the LP consists of a "series of sounds that appears wonky and disembodied yet produces a satisfying and effective through-line." A Drowned in Sound reviewer opined the LP was the most like Peaking Lights' early works, and as a result, "Peaking Lights have, rather bizarrely, flown forwards, proving in the process that, when handled correctly, nostalgia can be a fine tool." Marc Masters of Pitchfork wrote that the "unique signature" of Peaking Lights was much less buried in "generic" styles than on Cosmic Logic.

The mixed reviews of The Fifth State of Consciousness were primarily critical of the album's use of sounds that wander for too long. As Oliver stated, "the humidity rarely lets in any fresh air — certain tracks could do with their loops being curtailed, seemingly not knowing when to stop (‘Sweetness Isn’t Far Away’) — and lack of vocal variety (again, historically straight-laced) prompts the knock-on of making matters fuzzy and forgettable." He also noted the "disengagement" between the vocals and the music which "makes [the duo] sound achingly image conscious, a set of sunglasses saying everything and nothing." A Loud and Quiet critic wrote that "while [the duo] remain determined to move to their own beat, there’s little stopping [the album from] drifting off into the ether."

== Track listing ==
Derived from the liner notes of the official Bandcamp page for The Fifth State of Consciousness.

No.	Title	Length
1.	"Dreaming Outside"	6:51
2.	"Coyote Ghost Melodies"	7:17
3.	"Everytime I See the Light"	6:12
4.	"I'll Be In the Sky"	4:08
5.	"Love Can Move Mountains"	5:33
6.	"Sweetness Isn't Far Away"	10:24
7.	"Que Du Bon"	5:42
8.	"A Phoenix and a Fish"	6:24
9.	"Eclipse of the Heart"	6:55
10.	"In My Disguise"	5:03
11.	"Put Down Your Guns"	7:31
12.	"Wild Paradise"	6:56
Total length:		72:34

== Personnel ==
Derived from the liner notes of the official Bandcamp page for The Fifth State of Consciousness.

- Writing by Aaron Coyes and Indra Dunis
- Produced, recorded and mixed by Coyes at Dreamfuzz Studio in Los Angeles, California
- Mastered by Sonic Boom at New Atlantis in Yellow Springs, Ohio

== Release history ==
Region	Date	Format(s)	Label
Worldwide	June 16, 2017	Digital download; vinyl	Two Flowers
