= Peaking Lights =

American-Dutch psychedelic pop music duo

- Origin: San Francisco, CA
- Genre: Psychedelic pop
- Years active: 2008–present
- Labels: Night People; Mexican Summer; Weird World; Two Flowers
- Members: Aaron Coyes; Indra Dunis
- Website: peakinglights.com

Peaking Lights are a husband-and-wife music duo who met in San Francisco in 2006 and moved to Spring Green, Wisconsin in December 2007 where they lived until 2009. The couple then moved to Madison, Wisconsin, where they stayed until their return to the West Coast in 2011 to live in Los Angeles. Currently they are based in Amsterdam.

Peaking Lights' music has been described as psychedelic pop. The band formed in 2008, performing live in order to fund a road trip to Texas, at which point they self-released the CD-R Clearvoiant (later released on cassette via Night People).

The couple's son Mikko contributed vocals to their third album, Lucifer. In 2013 their second son Marlon was born.

They were among the "friends" that contributed in 2013 to The Flaming Lips' The Time Has Come To Shoot You Down…What A Sound, a reworking of the Stone Roses' debut album.

In 2019, Peaking Lights collaborated with Lee "Scratch" Perry on a 12-inch Life of the Plants, released under Perry's name on Stones Throw Records.

== Discography ==
=== Studio albums ===
- Imaginary Falcons (2009, Night People)
- 936 (2011, Weird World / Not Not Fun)
- Lucifer (2012, Mexican Summer / Weird World)
- Cosmic Logic (2014, Weird World)
- The Fifth State of Consciousness (2017, Two Flowers)
- E S C A P E (2020, Dekmantel)

=== EPs ===
- Space Primitive (2010, Night People)
- Lucifer in Dub (2012, Weird World / Mexican Summer)

=== Singles ===
- "Space Primitive" (12", S/Sided, EP, Cle) [2010]
- "All the Sun That Shines" (2011)
- "Low Hi" (2012)
- "Beautiful Son" (2012)
- "More High" (7", Single, Ltd) [2014]
- "Breakdown" (2014)
- "Everyone And Us" (2014)
- "Conga Blue" (2016)
