= Cold Beat =

American synth-pop band

- Origin: San Francisco, California, USA
- Genres: Synth-pop
- Years active: 2013
- Labels: Crime on the Moon; Dark Entries; DFA Records; Like LTD
- Members: Hannah Lew
- Website: Cold Beat's Bandcamp page

Cold Beat is an American synth-pop band founded in 2013 by Hannah Lew, formerly the bassist and co-vocalist of Grass Widow. Named after a song by the British post-punk group The Sound, the project began as a solo vehicle for songs Lew had written that did not fit Grass Widow's collaborative aesthetic, and evolved into a four-piece band. Cold Beat has released five studio albums and two EPs on Crime on the Moon (Lew's own label), Dark Entries Records, DFA Records, and Like LTD.

Other musicians to play on Cold Beat's music have included Grass Widow drummer Lillian Maring, Neon Piss guitarist Kyle King, Shannon and the Clams guitarist/synth player Cody Blanchard, Erase Errata drummer Bianca Sparta, drummer Susi Leni, guitarist Jackson Blumgart, guitarist Sean Monaghan, and keyboardist Luciano Talpini Aita.

Mother (2020) was recorded when Lew was pregnant. A review in Treble described it as "dream pop," with an electronic tone that goes well with Lew's "chilly vocal delivery."

== Discography ==
=== EPs ===
- Worms / Year 5772 (Crime on the Moon, 2013)
- A Simple Reflection (Dark Entries, 2018)

=== Albums ===
- Over Me (Crime on the Moon, 2014)
- Into the Air (Crime on the Moon, 2015)
- Chaos by Invitation (Crime on the Moon, 2017)
- Mother (DFA Records, 2020)
- War Garden (Like LTD, 2021)
