= A Sunny Day in Glasgow =

American shoegaze band

- Origin: Philadelphia, Pennsylvania, United States
- Genres: Dream pop, shoegaze, ambient
- Years active: 2006–current
- Labels: Mis Ojos Discos, Geographic North, Lefse Records
- Members: Ben Daniels; Josh Meakim; Annie Fredrickson; Jen Goma; Adam Herndon; Ryan Newmyer
- Past members: Ever Nalens; Lauren Daniels; Robin Daniels; Brice Hickey; Mich White; Beverly Science; Pete Leonard; Jason Trill
- Website: A Sunny Day in Glasgow

A Sunny Day in Glasgow is an American shoegaze band from Philadelphia, Pennsylvania. Formed in 2006, the band initially had a rotating lineup, with Ben Daniels as the only constant member. Since 2010, the group has consisted of Ben Daniels, Josh Meakim, Annie Fredrickson, Ryan Newmyer, Adam Herndon, and Jen Goma.

== Background ==
A Sunny Day in Glasgow began as a collaboration between friends Ben Daniels and Ever Nalens, who had recently returned to Philadelphia after several years in the UK. Nalens, who had been living in Glasgow, gave the band name, and Daniels kept it after Nalens left the project. Daniels also asked his twin sisters, Robin and Lauren, to start singing on the songs they had been working on.

In March 2006, the band collected several songs and released them as an EP titled The Sunniest Day Ever. The EP received attention from college radio, charting number 1 on NYU's WNYU, as well as music blogs, with Pitchfork Media contributing an early, favorable review.

In 2006, the band signed to Notenuf Records and eventually released their debut LP, Scribble Mural Comic Journal, in February 2007. The record received widespread critical acclaim with Pitchfork Media giving it an "8.0" and "Recommended" rating, while Drowned in Sound gave the album a "9/10" and called it a "contender for album of the year." The band compiled outtakes from earlier recording sessions and released them as the Tout New Age EP in the Summer of 2007.

2009 saw the band release their second studio LP, Ashes Grammar. The band was forced to undergo several member changes during the recording process. The first of these changes came when former bassist Brice Hickey fell when loading equipment into his car, breaking several bones in his legs. This left Ben Daniels to record the bass parts for the album but also meant that vocalist Robin Daniels had to leave to care for the bedridden Hickey, her boyfriend. Lauren Daniels also had to leave the group due to attending grad school in Colorado, forcing Ben Daniels and guitarist/drummer Josh Meakim to recruit vocalist Annie Fredrickson, a classically trained cellist and pianist. After recording the album, Ryan Newmyer joined as bassist and Meakim's friend Adam Herndon as drummer. In addition, through an advert via their Myspace blog, the band found another vocalist, Jen Goma. The new line-up completed all of the songs from the Ashes sessions and released them as the Nitetime Rainbows EP in March 2010 and "Autumn, Again" later in October

On June 24, 2014, they released their album Sea When Absent.

They released the double EP Planning Weed Like It's Acid / Life Is Loss on November 13, 2015

== Members ==
- Ben Daniels – guitars, programming
- Josh Meakim – guitars, keyboards, vocals
- Annie Fredrickson – vocals, cello, keyboards
- Jen Goma – vocals
- Ryan Newmeyer – bass
- Adam Herndon – drums

== Discography ==
=== Albums ===
- Scribble Mural Comic Journal (February 13, 2007) (CD/LP)
- Ashes Grammar (September 15, 2009) (CD/LP)
- Autumn, Again (October 19, 2010) (download/LP)
- Sea When Absent (June 24, 2014) (LP/CD/download)

=== EPs ===
- The Sunniest Day Ever (March 2006) (CDR)
- Tout New Age (July 10, 2007) (CDR)
- Nitetime Rainbows (March 2, 2010) (12 inch vinyl)
- No Death (2014) (CDR, free with Sea When Absent)
- Sketch for Winter (2014) (cassette)
- Planning Weed Like It's Acid / Life Is Loss (November 13, 2015) (CD)

=== Singles ===
- Slumberland Records: "Searching for the Now, Volume 3" 7" (June 11, 2008)
- Geographic North Records: "You Can't Hide Your Love Forever Vol. 1" - "(Cult of) The Cemetery Flowers (mandolins version)" 7" (July 8, 2008)
- "Summerlong Silences" 7" (July 21, 2008)
- "Shy", digital single (November 10, 2009)
