= Mutations (Vijay Iyer album) =

Studio album by Vijay Iyer
- Released: March 4, 2014
- Recorded: September 2013
- Studio: Avatar (New York, New York)
- Genre: Jazz
- Length: 60:13
- Label: ECM 2372
- Producer: Manfred Eicher

Vijay Iyer chronology
Holding It Down: The Veterans' Dreams Project (2013)	Mutations (2014)	Radhe Radhe: Rites of Holi (2014)

Mutations is a studio album by jazz pianist Vijay Iyer recorded in September 2013 and released on ECM the following year. The titular suite features a string quartet consisting of violinists Michi Wiancko and Miranda Cuckson, violist Kyle Armbrust, and cellist Kivie Cahn-Lipman.

== Reception ==
Professional ratings
Review scores
Source	Rating
AllMusic	4.5/5 stars
All About Jazz	5/5 stars
The Guardian	4/5 stars
Financial Times	4/5 stars
RTÉ.ie	2.5/5 stars
Exclaim!	7/10
Tom Hull	A–

The AllMusic review by Thom Jurek awarded the album 4½ stars out of 5, stating "Mutations rewards with well-considered, inspired performances."

Writing for All About Jazz, John Kelman said, "Mutations is a landmark recording from an artist who, while already possessing an admirable discography, has clearly been limited to more decidedly jazz-oriented concerns. Representing a significant musical shift, if Mutations is but the first sign of the greater freedom ECM plans to afford Iyer, the only vaticinator of what's to follow will surely be its complete and utter unpredictability."

The Guardian review by John Fordham awarded the album 4 stars, noting "It's thoughtful, typically original, and unexpectedly very exciting." Rob Shepherd, writing for PostGenre, noted "Vijay Iyer’s first for ECM is also arguably his best [to date]. While his previous releases showcased a supremely talented pianist, it appears that signing with the Munich-based label opened a number of doors creatively for him."

Not all reviews were as enthusiastic, with JazzTimes stating that "Mutations is a major disappointment. The problem is Iyer's writing for strings. There is a 10-part suite for string quartet, piano, and electronics. The suite is stunningly devoid of the aesthetic and emotional content that makes most people listen to music. Qualities such as lyric discovery, melodic fulfillment, and rhythmic engagement are absent."

== Track listing ==
All compositions by Vijay Iyer

1. "Spellbound and Sacrosanct, Cowrie Shells and the Shimmering Sea" - 7:39
2. "Vuln, Part 2" - 4:34
3. "Mutation 1: Air" - 4:12
4. "Mutation 2: Rise" - 2:44
5. "Mutation 3: Canon" - 5:47
6. "Mutation 4: Chain" - 5:25
7. "Mutation 5: Automata" - 6:32
8. "Mutation 6: Waves" - 3:00
9. "Mutation 7: Kernel" - 5:59
10. "Mutation 8: Clade" - 1:34
11. "Mutation 9: Descent" - 5:17
12. "Mutation 10: Time" - 4:00
13. "When We're Gone" - 3:30

== Personnel ==
- Vijay Iyer – piano, electronics
- Michi Wiancko, Miranda Cuckson – violin (tracks 3–12)
- Kyle Armbrust – viola (tracks 3–12)
- Kivie Cahn-Lipman – cello (tracks 3–12)
