= Jaakko Mattila =

Finnish abstract painter (born 1976)

- Born: Jaakko Antti Mattila; 30 July 1976 (age 49); Oulu, Finland
- Known for: Painter

Jaakko Antti Mattila (born 30 July 1976) is a Finnish abstract painter.

Mattila was born in Oulu, and graduated from The Surrey Institute of Art & Design University College in 2001. Since then his works have been displayed in Finland, the United Kingdom, Italy and France and he has made public works.

Mattila is interested in the fundamental elements that create our sense, or illusion, of the world. Nature is his biggest single inspiration. He is also interested in the constructive principles of the universe such as infinity, smallness, greatness and time. Among his paintings he has made sculptures, installations and art furniture. Mattila currently lives and works in Finland.

He is a member of the Finnish Painters Union, Oulu Artist Organisation and artist group CollectEast.

== Public works ==
- Pallautuneet-sculpture, traffic signs, steel, polyurethane paint, Nallikari Camping, Hietasaari, Oulu, 2005
- Mural (with Petri Yrjölä), Club 45 Special, Oulu, 2006
- A Detail of the Cosmos (45 remix), acrylic, Club 45 Special, Oulu, 2007

== Literature ==
- Jaakko Mattila: Teoksia 2003-2008, Kalevaprint, 2008, ISBN 978-952-92-4011-1 (in Finnish and English)
