= Over Me (album) =

Debut album by Cold Beat

Studio album by Cold Beat
- Released: July 8, 2014
- Label: Crime on the Moon

Cold Beat chronology
Over Me (2014)	Into the Air (2015)

Over Me is the first full-length album by Cold Beat, released in 2014 on the label Crime on the Moon. Cold Beat is the recording project of American artist and multi-instrumentalist Hannah Lew. On this album the band included Neon Piss guitarist Kyle King and Erase Errata drummer Bianca Sparta.

== Reception ==
The album received a 7.6/10 on Pitchfork, with the reviewer noting that "Over Me is Hannah Lew standing before the mirror, unsure of what she sees within herself, her future, her music. But she’s looking." Consequence of Sound was more mixed, saying that the album is "not a complete regurgitation of the past; it’s straightforward, pastoral rock channeled through a lo-fi filter that’s appealing if rarely all that exciting." WNYC praised the album's "controlled chaos" and Lew's "ethereal vocals."
