= Salt (disambiguation) =

Salt is a dietary mineral, used for flavoring and preservation.

Salt or salts may also refer to:

== Chemistry ==
- Salt (chemistry), an ionic compound
  - Epsom salt, magnesium sulfate
  - Glauber's salt, sodium sulfate
  - Sodium chloride, the main ingredient in edible salt (table salt)
- Halite (rock salt)
- Road salt, calcium chloride or sodium chloride used to de-ice roads
- Sea salt, a mixture of salts and minerals, obtained by evaporation of seawater

== Places ==
- Salt, Jordan
  - Salt Municipality, a municipality in and around Salt, Jordan
- Salt Rural LLG, Papua New Guinea
- Salt, Spain, a municipality in Catalonia
- Salt, Staffordshire, England
- Salt, Uttarakhand, a town in Uttarakhand, India
  - Salt (Uttarakhand Assembly constituency), the state Assembly constituency centered around the town
- Salt River (disambiguation)

== People with the name ==
- Salt (surname)
- Salt (rapper) (born Cheryl James, 1966), hip-hop artist and member of Salt-N-Pepa
- Abu al-Salt, Andalusian-Arab polymath
- Don Reitz, American ceramic artist nicknamed "Mr. Salt"
- Salt, female professional wrestler from the Gorgeous Ladies of Wrestling

== Arts, entertainment, and media ==
=== Fictional characters ===
- Salt, played by Haruka Shimazaki in the series Majisuka Gakuen
- Charlie Salt, played by Sammy Davis Jr. in the 1968 film Salt and Pepper
- Evelyn Salt, the titular protagonist of the 2010 film Salt
- Heluda Salt, in the 2002 Tamora Pierce novel Cold Fire
- Mr. Salt, in the Nick Jr. series Blue's Clues
- Mr. Salt, a recurring character in the animated streaming television series Close Enough
- Sally Salt, played by Sarah Polley in the 1988 film The Adventures of Baron Munchausen
- Veruca Salt (character), in the 1964 Roald Dahl novel Charlie and the Chocolate Factory

=== Films ===
- Salt (1965 film), a Bulgarian short documentary by Eduard Zahariev
- Salt (1985 film), North Korean tragedy film
- Salt (1987 film), an Indian Malayalam film
- Salt (2006 film), a thriller
- Salt (2009 film), a short documentary
- Salt (2010 film), an action film starring Angelina Jolie

=== Literature ===
- Salt (Roberts novel), a 2000 science fiction novel by Adam Roberts
- Salt (Lovelace novel), a 1997 Trinidadian novel by Earl Lovelace
- Salt: A World History, a non-fiction book by Mark Kurlansky
- Salt: An International Journal of Poetry and Poetics, a literary journal published in Australia from 1990 until 2003

=== Music ===
==== Groups ====
- Salt (Swedish band), a Swedish alternative rock band
- Salt (French-American band), a French-American rock band founded in 2016
- SALT (quartet), a Swedish barbershop quartet

==== Albums ====
- Salt (Angie McMahon album), 2019
- Salt (Arto Lindsay album), 2004
- Salt (Forget Cassettes album)
- Salt (Half Moon Run album)
- Salt (Lizz Wright album), 2003
- Salt (Venetian Snares album)
- Salt (Wuthering Heights album)
- Salt (Blackbear EP)

==== Songs ====
- "Salt" (Ava Max song), 2018
- "Salt" (Oh Land song), 2019
- "Salt", a song by Bad Suns from Language & Perspective, 2014
- "Salt", a song by Lizz Wright from Salt, 2003
- "Salt", a song by Moka Only from Carrots and Eggs, 2008
- "Salt", a song by Madrugada from Industrial Silence, 1999
- "Salt", a song by Tinashe from Joyride, 2018
- "Salt", a song by Venetian Snares from Salt, 2000
- "S.A.L.T.", a song by The Orb on Orblivion, 1997
- "Salts", a song by Sannhet from So Numb, 2017

==== Opera ====
- "Salt", a mini-opera for alto voice, amplified cello and electronics by Missy Mazzoli from 2012

== Computing ==
- Salt (cryptography), random data used as an additional input to a one-way function that hashes a password or passphrase
- Salt (software), a Python-based open source configuration management and remote execution application
- Speech Application Language Tags, an XML-based markup language
- Syntactic salt, a type of computer language syntax

== Enterprises ==
- Salt Mobile, a Swiss mobile provider
- Salt Publishing, a book publisher
- Salts Healthcare, UK medical manufacturer
- Salts Mill, former textile mill now art gallery etc in Saltaire, West Yorkshire, UK
- Salt (food truck), a food truck in Dubai

== Organizations ==
- SALT (institution), a non-profit institution in Istanbul, Turkey
- Sail and Life Training Society (SALTS), a non-profit Christian organization based in Victoria, British Columbia, which provides sail training and life lessons
- Salt Grammar School, former name of Titus Salt School, Bradford, England
- Salts F.C., a soccer team in Saltaire, West Yorkshire, England, UK
- Socialist Alternative (Australia) (SAlt; c.f. SA for Socialist Alliance), a revolutionary socialist organisation in Australia
- Solidarity Across Land Trades, a UK trade union representing land-workers
- The Savior's Alliance for Lifting the Truth, a sexual abstinence organization

== Other uses ==
- Salt (Swedish magazine), political magazine published between 1999 and 2002
- Salt (union organizing), a labor union member who gets a job at a specific workplace with the intent of organizing a union
- Salt cellar, also known just as "salt", tableware
- SALT Conference, a financial conference hosted by SkyBridge Capital
- Seminars About Long-term Thinking (SALT), a lecture series
- Skin-associated lymphoid tissue, a component of Mucosa-associated lymphoid tissue
- SkyBridge Alternatives Conference (SALT), the largest hedge fund conference in the world
- Southern African Large Telescope (SALT), a 10-metre class optical telescope at the South African Astronomical Observatory
- Speech and Language Therapy (SALT)
- State and local tax, especially in the context of the state and local tax ("SALT") deduction in US federal income tax
- Strategic Arms Limitation Talks, nuclear weapon talks between the US and USSR, or the resultant treaties:
  - SALT I of 1972
  - SALT II of 1979

== See also ==
- Ionic compound
- Saltvik, a municipality of Åland
- Salter (disambiguation)
- Salting (disambiguation)
- Salty (disambiguation)
- Sault (disambiguation)
