= Salting =

Salting or Salted may refer to:

- Salting (food), the preparation of food with edible salt for conservation or taste
- Salting the earth, the practice of "sowing" salt on cities or property as a symbolic act
- Salting (union organizing), a labor union tactic involving the act of getting a job at a specific workplace with the intent of organizing a union
- Salting (initiation ceremony), an early modern English university initiation ceremony
- Salting roads, the application of salt to roads in winter to act as a de-icing agent
- Salting a bird's tail, a superstition
- Salting out, a method of separating proteins using salt
- Figuratively, adding ("sprinkling") a small quantity of something to something else for various reasons
  - Salt (cryptography), a method to secure passwords
  - Salted bomb, a nuclear weapon specifically engineered to enhance residual radioactivity
  - Salting (confidence trick), process of adding valuable substances to a core sample, or otherwise scattering valuable resources on a piece of property to be "discovered" by a prospective buyer
  - Salting mailing lists, including fictitious entries in mailing lists to detect misuse
- A "Salting Carpet" is a type of Persian carpet from the 16th century named after "The Salting Carpet" in the collection of the Victoria & Albert Museum (T.402-1910)
- Salt marsh
- Salted (book), a 2010 cookbook by Mark Bitterman
- In quality control, deliberately placing defective pieces among a batch to be inspected or tested, to confirm effectiveness

== People ==
- George Salting (1835–1909), Australian-born English art collector, who left the Salting Bequest, which included the
  - Salting Madonna (Antonello da Messina), National Gallery, London

== See also ==
- Salt (disambiguation)
- Salter (disambiguation)
- Salty (disambiguation)
