= Urban Blues (Leroy Jenkins album) =

Live album by Leroy Jenkins's Sting
- Released: 1984
- Recorded: January 2, 1984
- Venue: Sweet Basil, New York City
- Genre: jazz
- Length: 38:19
- Label: Black Saint; BSR 0083
- Producer: Leroy Jenkins

Leroy Jenkins chronology
Straight Ahead/Free at Last (1980)	Urban Blues (1984)	Leroy Jenkins Live! (1993)

Urban Blues is a live album by violinist and composer Leroy Jenkins. It was recorded in January 1984 at Sweet Basil in New York City, and was released by Black Saint later that year. On the album, Jenkins is joined by members of his band Sting: Terry Jenoure on violin and vocals, Brandon Ross and James Emery on guitar, Alonzo Gardner on bass, and Kamal Sabir on drums.

== Reception ==
Professional ratings
Review scores
Source	Rating
AllMusic	4/5 stars
The Penguin Guide to Jazz	2.5/4 stars
The Rolling Stone Jazz & Blues Album Guide	4/5 stars

In a review for AllMusic, Ron Wynn wrote: "Violinist Leroy Jenkins was at the helm of Sting, which played funky and free, did originals and vintage spirituals, and would shift from stretches of collective improvisation to challenging solo exchanges. They were a unique, intriguing group, but sadly didn't last. This 1984 album... presented them at their best, displaying the breadth of influences, genres, sources and styles that converged and resulted in the work of a great band. "

The authors of the Penguin Guide to Jazz Recordings commented: "Jenkins's working band Sting were capable of great things in a live setting, an impact not unlike that of Ornette Coleman's Prime Time. The instrumentation is strongly reminiscent... but Jenkins redeploys the harmonic and rhythmic emphases differently. Where Prime Time can be bludgeoningly illogical, Sting can sound, as here, perversely rational."

== Track listing ==
All compositions by Leroy Jenkins.

1. "Static in the Attic" – 6:25
2. "Looking for the Blues" – 9:50
3. "Come on Home, Baby" – 2:25
4. "Why Can't I Fly?" – 5:31
5. "O.W. Fredrick" – 7:15
6. "No Banks River" – 4:00
7. "Through the Ages, Jehovah" – 2:53

== Personnel ==
- Leroy Jenkins – violin
- Terry Jenoure – violin, vocals
- Brandon Ross – guitar
- James Emery – guitar
- Alonzo Gardner – bass
- Kamal Sabir – drums
