= Maldoror =

Maldoror may refer to:

- Maldoror (album), a solo album by American cellist Erik Friedlander
- Maldoror (band), a music project consisting of Mike Patton and Masami Akita
- Maldoror (film), a 2024 film by Fabrice Du Welz
- Maldoror (record label), a label founded by David Tibet
- Sarah Maldoror (1929−2020), a French filmmaker
- Les Chants de Maldoror, a 19th-century French poetic novel
