= Where's Your Cup? =

Studio album by Henry Threadgill
- Released: 1997
- Recorded: August 1996
- Genre: Jazz, post-bop, avant-garde
- Length: 66:13
- Label: Columbia
- Producer: Henry Threadgill, Bill Laswell

Henry Threadgill chronology
Makin' a Move (1995)	Where's Your Cup? (1997)	Everybodys Mouth's a Book (2001)

Where's Your Cup? is an album by Henry Threadgill released on the Columbia label in 1997. The album features seven of Threadgill's compositions performed by Threadgill's Make a Move band: Brandon Ross, Tony Cedras, Stomu Takeishi, and J.T. Lewis.

== Reception ==
The Allmusic review by John Uhl awarded the album 4 stars, stating, "Even though Henry Threadgill is often considered "difficult to listen to," most blindfolded listeners would probably find themselves identifying any randomly selected 20-second segment of Where's Your Cup as something a little more mainstream... Such is the elusiveness of Threadgill's a-bit-of-everything approach to modern jazz, a style-collage sound he achieves here with a lot of help from his band, Make a Move... But give the credit of assembling these varied and sundry elements into a consistent product to Threadgill. Where's My Cup has its highly organized moments as well, which possess the same spaced-out mysteriousness as all the clamoring jam-out uproar".

Professional ratings
Review scores
Source	Rating
Allmusic	4/5 stars

== Track listing ==
All compositions by Henry Threadgill

1. "100 Year Old Game" - 10:54
2. "Laughing Club" - 5:00
3. "Where's Your Cup?" - 11:14
4. "And This" - 13:40
5. "Feels Like It" - 6:39
6. "The Flew" - 9:50
7. "Go to Far" - 8:56

Recorded at East Side Sound, New York City in August 1996

== Personnel ==
- Henry Threadgill - alto saxophone, flute
- Brandon Ross - electric guitar, classical guitar
- Tony Cedras - accordion, harmonium
- Stomu Takeishi - 5-string fretless bass
- J.T. Lewis - drums
