= Prize (album) =

Studio album by Arto Lindsay
- Released: 1999
- Label: Righteous Babe
- Producer: Arto Lindsay, Melvin Gibbs, Andres Levin

Arto Lindsay chronology
| Noon Chill (1997) | Prize (1999) | Ecomixes (2000) |

Prize is an album by the American musician Arto Lindsay, released in 1999. Lindsay considered it an attempt at pop music; it is one of a number of his solo albums inspired by the Brazilian music he heard while growing up in the country.

== Production ==
The album was produced by Lindsay, Melvin Gibbs, and Andres Levin. It was recorded in Bahia and New York. Five of the songs are sung in Portuguese. Vinicius Cantuaria and Skoota Warner contributed to the album; Beans rapped on "Prefeelings".

== Critical reception ==
Professional ratings
Review scores
| Source | Rating |
|---|---|
| AllMusic | 4/5 stars |
| Robert Christgau | A− |
| The Encyclopedia of Popular Music | 3/5 stars |
| Los Angeles Times | 3.5/4 stars |
| Orange County Register | A− |
| Orlando Sentinel | 5/5 stars |

Robert Christgau stated that the songs float by "on the sinuous current and spring-fed babble of a Brazilian groove bent, folded, spindled, and mutilated by the latest avant-dance fads and electronic developments." The Riverfront Times wrote: "Sensuous and ripe, exotic and incandescent, Prize pulsates along rhythms whose headwaters are found in the airy heights of Brazilian tropicalia jazz." Newsday thought that "the disc has the soft, understated swing of bossa nova—even Lindsay's occasionally skronk guitar doesn't much disturb its romantic patina."

The Los Angeles Times noted that "this master alchemist likes to offset his love of lush, tropical music with sharp, modernist accents." The Orlando Sentinel determined that "Lindsay's slightly out-of-focus singing has a dreamy gentleness that helps unite the strikingly disparate elements on Prize ... the bossa nova and samba prove perfectly compatible with elements of avant-electronica and obstreperous art-rock." The Independent listed Prize as one of the 15 best pop albums of 1999.

AllMusic wrote that "the drum'n'bass textures that lay on the surface of his last album like laminate are more fully integrated this time out: 'Prefeelings' combines a fractured breakbeat with salsa-fied acoustic guitar and saxophones."

== Track listing ==
| No. | Title | Length |
|---|---|---|
| 1. | "Ondina" |
| 2. | "The Prize" |
| 3. | "Pode Ficar" |
| 4. | "Prefeelings" |
| 5. | "Modos" |
| 6. | "Ex-Preguiça" |
| 7. | "Unsure" |
| 8. | "Resemblances" |
| 9. | "O Nome Dela" |
| 10. | "Tone" |
| 11. | "Interior Life" |
| 12. | "E Ai Esqueço" |
