= Prowl =

Prowl may refer to:

- Prowl, walking while partially squatting to maintain a low profile
- Predation, a biological interaction where a predator, an organism that is hunting, feeds on its prey
- Prowl (Transformers), a fictional robot superhero character in the Transformers robot superhero franchise.
- Prowl (album), a 2006 album by cellist Erik Friedlander
- Prowl (film), a horror film starring Bruce Payne
- Prowl, a lifestyle brand by Indian actor Tiger Shroff
