= Quake (album) =

Studio album by Erik Friedlander
- Released: April 22, 2003
- Recorded: January 15 & 16, 2002; Context Studio, New York, NY
- Genre: Avant-garde, jazz, contemporary classical music
- Length: 62:19
- Label: Cryptogramophone CG 118
- Producer: Erik Friedlander

Erik Friedlander chronology
Grains of Paradise (2001)	Quake (2003)	Maldoror (2003)

Quake is a 2003 album by cellist Erik Friedlander which was released on the Cryptogramophone label featuring the quartet that previously appeared on Topaz.

== Reception ==
Professional ratings
Review scores
Source	Rating
Allmusic	4.5/5 stars

The Allmusic review by Thom Jurek awarded the album 4½ stars stating "Ultimately, Quake is a newer and finer example than anything before of Friedlander's unified vision of not only jazz but also the engagement of the dynamic and harmonic within an ensemble to create something that is compelling, beautiful, and unusual even in the outsider downtown tradition".

Writing for All About Jazz, Elliot Simon commented "Quake is further indication that Topaz, led by Friedlander's cello and world view, continues to break ground with its particular brand of synchronic global stew".

Andrew Lindemann Malone stated in JazzTimes that "Erik Friedlander, however, has shown throughout his career that the personality of a cello is determined more than anything else by the personality of its cellist, and his new album as a leader, Quake, proves that even when surrounded by strong, imaginative personalities, his cello is anything but reticent".

== Track listing ==
All compositions by Erik Friedlander.

1. "Consternation" - 4:25
2. "After Hours" - 4:07
3. "Bedlam" - 6:13
4. "Gol Gham" - 3:35
5. "Wire" - 5:49
6. "Beauty Beauty" - 11:15
7. "Quake" - 3:32
8. "Sainted" - 3:49
9. "Glass Bell" - 5:31
10. "Biscuits" - 5:47
11. "Aap Ki" - 2:48
12. "Fig" - 5:16

== Personnel ==
- Erik Friedlander – cello
- Andy Laster – alto saxophone
- Stomu Takeishi – bass
- Satoshi Takeishi – percussion
