= In for a Penny, In for a Pound (disambiguation) =

In for a Penny, In for a Pound is 2015 album composed by Henry Threadgill for his jazz quintet that won the 2016 Pulitzer Prize for Music.

In for a Penny, In for a Pound may also refer to

- "In for a Penny, In for a Pound", a 2014 season 2 episode of Canadian series Yukon Gold
- "In for a Penny, In for a Pound", a 2016 season 3 episode of Japanese series Durarara!!x2

== See also ==
- In for a Penny (disambiguation)
