= Christopher Hoffman =

Christopher Hoffman may refer to:

- Christopher Hoffman (actor) (born 1981), Zimbabwe actor and voice artist
- Christopher Hoffman (musician) (born 1978), American cellist, composer, sound technician and filmmaker

== See also ==
- Christoph Hoffmann (1815–1885), theologian
- Christoph Hoffmann (politician) (born 1957), German politician
