= Lust (Ambitious Lovers album) =

Studio album by Ambitious Lovers
- Released: January 18, 1991
- Studios: Skyline, Creative Audio, Power Station, and Platinum Island, New York City, NY
- Genre: New wave
- Length: 47:28
- Label: Elektra
- Producer: Peter Scherer

Ambitious Lovers chronology
Greed (1984)	Lust (1991)

Lust is the third album by Ambitious Lovers. It was released in 1991 through Elektra Records. It was the band's final album.

The band's cover of Jorge Ben's "Umbabarauma" was a minor dance hit.

== Production ==
The album was produced by band member Peter Scherer.

== Critical reception ==
Professional ratings
Review scores
Source	Rating
AllMusic	4.5/5 stars
Robert Christgau	(1-star Honorable Mention)
The Encyclopedia of Popular Music	3/5 stars
Entertainment Weekly	B
MusicHound Rock: The Essential Album Guide	3.5/5 stars
The Rolling Stone Album Guide	3.5/5 stars

Trouser Press wrote that "Lust has enough of that unique Lindsay guitar squeal to keep the old-timers interested, but traditionalists might be disappointed that Arto’s turning into an out-and-out crooner — and a damn good one at that." The New York Times thought that the album "works with the idea that the subversion of mass-market tastes can be achieved by slipping in noise, odd sounds and other things under a shiny, pop veneer." The Spin Alternative Record Guide wrote that it oozes "sensual, hypnotic funk and samba."

== Track listing ==
All tracks are written by Arto Lindsay and Peter Scherer, except where noted.

No.	Title	Writer(s)	Length
1.	"Lust"		4:56
2.	"It's Gonna Rain"		4:44
3.	"Tuck It In"		4:30
4.	"Ponta de Lança Africano (Umbabarauma)"	Ben Jor	4:57
5.	"Monster"		4:39
6.	"Villain"	Veloso	4:54
7.	"Half Out of It"		4:56
8.	"Slippery"		3:42
9.	"Make It Easy"		3:50
10.	"More Light"		3:50
11.	"É Preciso Perdoar"	Coqueijo, Luz	2:30

== Personnel ==
Ambitious Lovers

- Arto Lindsay – vocals, guitar
- Peter Scherer – keyboards, synthesizer bass, sampling, production

Additional musicians

- D.K. Dyson – backing vocals
- Melvin Gibbs – bass guitar
- Tony Lewis – drums
- Marc Ribot – guitar
- Naná Vasconcelos – percussion

Production

- Paul Angelli – assistant engineering
- Scott Ansell – additional recording
- Josef Astor – photography
- Jason Baker – recording
- Patrick Dillett – assistant engineering
- Bil Emmons – assistant engineering
- Masashi Kuwamoto – photography
- Anthony Lee – art direction
- Bob Ludwig – mastering
- Francis Manzella – additional recording
- Katherine Miller – assistant engineering
- Roger Moutenot – mixing, assistant recording
- David Schiffman – assistant engineering
- Norika Sora – illustrations
- Tomoyo Tanaka – art direction
