= Stomu Takeishi =

Japanese jazz rock bass player (born 1964)

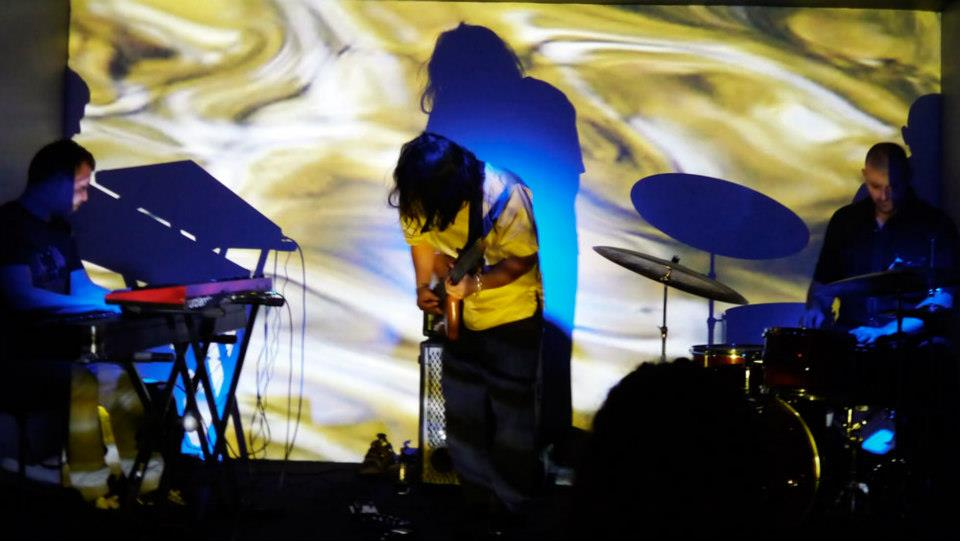
- Stomu Takeishi with Hernán Hecht and Mark Aanderud

Background information
- Born: 1964 (age 60–61); Mito, Ibaraki, Japan
- Genres: Jazz rock
- Occupation: Musician
- Instrument: Bass guitar

Stomu Takeishi (born 1964, in Mito, Ibaraki Prefecture) is a Japanese experimental and jazz rock bassist. He is known for playing fretless five-string electric bass guitar and a Klein five-string acoustic bass guitar, often using extended techniques and electronic manipulations such as looping.

== Career ==
Takeishi began as a koto player. He moved to the United States in 1983 to attend the Berklee College of Music in Boston, Massachusetts. After completing his degree in 1986, he moved to Manhattan to continue his studies at The New School.

In the 1990s, he began to achieve prominence as an innovative New York jazz bass player, and critics have noted both his adventurous playing and sensitivity to sound and timbre. He has played in many international jazz festivals and often performs at major venues in New York, the United States, and Europe.

He has performed and/or recorded with Don Cherry, Henry Threadgill, Pat Metheny, Bill Frisell, Butch Morris, Dave Liebman, Randy Brecker, Wynton Marsalis, Paul Motian, Myra Melford, Cuong Vu, Badal Roy, David Tronzo, Erik Friedlander, Satoko Fujii, Laszlo Gardony, Ahmad Mansour, Andy Laster, Ned Rothenberg, and with Molé, a trio with Hernan Hecht and Mark Aanderud. Takeishi also plays in groups with his brother, percussionist Satoshi Takeishi, though the two did not collaborate until Satoshi moved to New York in the 1990s.

Takeishi began duo collaborations with Brandon Ross in the year 2000, having gotten to know him while playing together in Henry Threadgill's Make A Move band in the mid-1990s. The two perform as For Living Lovers, and released their first album, Revealing Essence, in 2014.

In 2009, the DownBeat Critics Poll named Takeishi Rising Star, Electric Bass.

== Discography ==
With Taylor Ho Bynum

- The Ambiguity Manifesto (Firehouse 12, 2019)

With Erik Friedlander

- Topaz (Siam, 1999)
- Skin (Siam, 2000)
- Quake (Cryptogramaphone, 2003)
- Prowl (Cryptogramaphone, 2006)

With Myra Melford

- Dance Beyond the Color (Arabesque, 2000) with Crush
- Where the Two Worlds Touch (Arabesque, 2004) with The Tent
- The Image of Your Body (Cryptogramophone, 2006) with Be Bread
- The Whole Tree Gone (Firehouse 12, 2010) with Be Bread
- Snowy Egret (Yellowbird, 2015)
- The Other Side of Air (Firehouse 12, 2018)

With Molé (Mark Aanderud, Hernan Hecht, Takeishi)

- RGB (RareNoise Records, 2014)

With Paul Motian

- Paul Motian and the Electric Bebop Band (Winter & Winter, 2004)

With Lucía Pulido

- Waning Moon (Adventure Music, 2008)

With Brandon Ross

- For Living Lovers : Brandon Ross | Stomu Takeishi - Revealing Essence (Sunnyside Records, 2014)

With Henry Threadgill

- Where's Your Cup? (Columbia, 1996)
- Everybodys Mouth's a Book (Pi, 2001)
- This Brings Us to Volume 1 (Pi, 2009)
- This Brings Us to Volume 2 (Pi, 2010)
- Tomorrow Sunny / The Revelry, Spp (Pi, 2012)

With Cuong Vu

- Ragged Jack (Avant, 1997)
- Bound (Omnitone, 2000)
- Pure (Knitting Factory, 2000)
- Come Play with Me (Knitting Factory, 2001)
- It's Mostly Residual (ArtistShare/EMI, 2005)
- Vu-Tet (ArtistShare, 2007)
- Leaps of Faith (Origin, 2011)
- Cuong Vu Trio Meets Pat Metheny (Nonesuch, 2016)
