= Noon Chill =

Studio album by Arto Lindsay
- Released: September 1997
- Genre: Art pop, bossa nova, tropicália, jazz pop, experimental rock
- Length: 48:02
- Label: For Life, Bar None, Rykodisc
- Producer: Arto Lindsay, 7 Cycle, Andrés Levin, Melvin Gibbs, Patrick Dillett

Arto Lindsay chronology
Mundo Civilizado (1996)	Noon Chill (1997)	Prize (1999)

Noon Chill is the third solo album by American musician Arto Lindsay.

== Critical reception ==
Professional ratings
Review scores
Source	Rating
AllMusic	4.5/5 stars
DownBeat	4/5 stars
Pitchfork	6.8/10
Spin	7/10
Uncut	4/5 stars
The Village Voice	B+

Commenting on the "duality" of Lindsay's work, DownBeat critic Jon Andrews wrote that "the moody songs on Noon Chill transmit mixed signals, scrambling tenderness and romanticism with aloof detachment and cryptic lyrics." He further noted that the record's lilting Brazilian rhythms are "offset" by its keyboard textures, a contrast he credited for "giving the music its edge." AllMusic's Tim Sheridan highlighted the album's "hypnotic rhythms and enigmatic lyrics" and found that Lindsay's "narcotic delivery is nicely suited to the pictures he paints."

== Track listing ==
1. "Noon Chill"
2. "Whirlwind"
3. "Simply Are"
4. "Blue Eye Shadow"
5. "Mulata Fuzarqueira"
6. "Ridicously Deep"
7. "Anything"
8. "Gods are Weak"
9. "Take My Place"
10. "Daily Life"
11. "Light Moves Away"
12. "Why Compare"
13. "Reentry"
