= Everybodys Mouth's a Book =

Studio album by Henry Threadgill
- Released: 2001
- Recorded: February 25–27, 2001
- Studio: Orange Music Sound Studio, West Orange, NJ
- Genre: Jazz
- Length: 50:28
- Label: Pi Recordings
- Producer: Henry Threadgill

Henry Threadgill chronology
Where's Your Cup? (1996)	Everybodys Mouth's a Book (2001)	Up Popped the Two Lips (2001)

Everybodys Mouth's a Book is an album by Henry Threadgill featuring eight of Threadgill's compositions performed by Threadgill & Make a Move. The album was the first album on the Pi Recordings label and was released simultaneously with Up Popped the Two Lips by Threadgill's Zooid in 2001.

== Reception ==
Both of Threadgill's initial Pi releases attracted critical approval. The Allmusic review by Thom Jurek awarded the album 4 stars, stating, "This is deft footwork on the part of Threadgill as a leader, who lets his musicians shine and keeps them focused on the task at hand. Everybody's Mouth's a Book is as solid top to bottom as its companion release on Pi". The All About Jazz review by Glenn Astarita stated, "Henry Threadgill's importance to modern jazz cannot be denied, as there are few composers who possess such a distinguishable methodology to music in general". The Boston Phoenix{'}s Ed Hazell stated, "Everybodys Mouth’s a Book, the Make a Move quintet’s second release, feels like a more traditional jazz album: the tempos are faster, and the instrumentation is closer to what you expect from a jazz quintet. But after the band’s first album, this one too defies expectation".

Professional ratings
Review scores
Source	Rating
Allmusic	4/5 stars
The Penguin Guide to Jazz Recordings	3.5/4 stars

== Track listing ==
All compositions by Henry Threadgill

1. "Platinum Inside Straight" - 7:10
2. "Don't Turn Around" - 7:32
3. "Biggest Crumb" - 4:42
4. "Burnt Til Recognition" - 7:35
5. "Where Coconuts Fall" - 6:32
6. "Pink Water Pink Airplane" - 3:42
7. "Shake It Off" - 5:07
8. "What to Do, What to Do" - 8:08

== Personnel ==
- Henry Threadgill - alto saxophone, flute
- Bryan Carrott - vibraphone, marimba
- Brandon Ross - electric guitar, acoustic guitar
- Stomu Takeishi - electric bass, acoustic bass guitar
- Dafnis Prieto - drums
