= Salty =

Salty commonly refers to:

- High concentration of salt
- Salinity, the saltiness of a liquid
- Saltiness, one of the basic tastes

== People ==
- B. Chance Saltzman (born 1969), 2nd U.S. Space Force chief of space operations
- Salty Parker (1912–1992), baseball player and coach
- Salty du Rand (1926–1979), South African rugby player
- Salty Saltwell (born 1924), baseball manager
- Jarrod Saltalamacchia (born 1985), baseball player

== Characters ==
- Mister Salty, a character for advertising Nabisco Mr. Salty Pretzels
- Salty the Seal, a character in Disney's Pluto cartoons
- Salty, a diesel engine in Thomas the Tank Engine and Friends
- Salty the Parrot, first mate in Sinbad Jr. and his Magic Belt
- Salty, a character of the group Captain Bogg and Salty

== Film ==
- Salty (film), a 1973 family film about a sea-lion
- Gun Shy (2017 film), a 2017 comedy film produced under the working title Salty

== Other uses ==
- Salty (album), by The Mutton Birds
- Salty and Roselle § Salty, one of two guide dogs who led their owners out of the World Trade Center during the September 11 attacks
- Salty, slang for any ocean-going ship that enters the Great Lakes via the St. Lawrence Seaway
- Internet slang for the feeling of resentment

== See also ==
- Saltwater crocodiles in Australia, colloquial "Saltie"
- Salt (disambiguation)
- Salty dog (disambiguation)
- Saltire (diagonal cross)
