= This Brings Us to Volume 2 =

Studio album by Henry Threadgill
- Released: 2010
- Recorded: November 2008
- Studio: Brooklyn Recording, Brooklyn
- Genre: Jazz
- Length: 43:27
- Label: Pi Recordings
- Producer: Liberty Ellman

Henry Threadgill chronology
This Brings Us to Volume 1 (2009)	This Brings Us to Volume 2 (2010)	Tomorrow Sunny / The Revelry, Spp (2012)

This Brings Us to Volume 2 is an album by American jazz saxophonist Henry Threadgill with his band Zooid, featuring Jose Davila on trombone and tuba, Liberty Ellman on guitar, Stomu Takeishi on bass guitar, and Elliot Humberto Kavee on drums. It was recorded in 2008 and released on Pi Recordings.

== Reception ==
Professional ratings
Review scores
Source	Rating
AllMusic	4/5 stars
Down Beat	3.5/5 stars

In his review for AllMusic, Thom Jurek states, "The music Zooid creates has the subtlety and lyricism of fine poetry. Given Threadgill's reputation as a musical polymath, this shouldn't be a surprise, because, as evidenced here, in his own way he is reinventing jazz from the inside out."

The Down Beat review by Bill Meyer notes, "Despite a conceptual debt to the collectivism of Ornette Coleman's harmolodics, you won't mistake this music for anyone's other than Threadgill's, even though he keeps a tight rein on his own plating."

The All About Jazz review by Troy Collins says, "A superb follow-up to last year's return to form, This Brings Us to, Volume 2 is a stellar effort documenting the ongoing efforts of one of today's most important improvising composers."

== Track listing ==
All Compositions by Henry Threadgill

1. "Lying Eyes" – 10:04
2. "This Brings Us to" – 6:30
3. "Extremely Sweet William" – 8:08
4. "Polymorph" – 11:29
5. "It Never Moved" – 7:16

== Personnel ==
- Henry Threadgill – flute, alto saxophone
- Liberty Ellman – guitar
- Jose Davila – trombone, tuba
- Stomu Takeishi – bass guitar
- Elliot Humberto Kavee – drums
