= Grains of Paradise (album) =

Studio album by Erik Friedlander
- Released: November 20, 2001
- Recorded: June 18 & 19, 2001; Context Studios, New York, NY
- Genre: Avant-garde, jazz, contemporary classical music
- Length: 56:05
- Label: Tzadik TZ 7154
- Producer: Erik Friedlander

Erik Friedlander chronology
Skin (2000)	Grains of Paradise (2001)	Quake (2004)

Grains of Paradise is a 2001 album by cellist Erik Friedlander which was released on the Tzadik label.

== Reception ==
Professional ratings
Review scores
Source	Rating
Allmusic	4/5 stars
The Penguin Guide to Jazz Recordings	2.5/4 stars

The Allmusic review by Thom Jurek awarded the album 4 stars stating "Fans of Friedlander's earlier work may at first be put off by all the violins, but those willing to offer a second listen will be taken by the sheer generosity of the vision and the expansive artfulness on display here compositionally. Wonderful".

== Track listing ==
All compositions by Erik Friedlander

1. "Zahtar" – 3:39
2. "Na'Na'" – 4:40
3. "Shamir" – 6:22
4. "Tapuz" – 3:35
5. "Rashad" – 6:09
6. "Aley Dafna" – 3:53
7. "Batzal" – 7:42
8. "Tziporen" – 8:33
9. "Grains of Paradise" – 5:14

== Personnel ==
- Erik Friedlander – cello
- Joyce Hammann, Karen Milne, Peter Rovit – violin
- Bryce Dessner – guitar
- Trevor Dunn – bass
- Satoshi Takeishi – percussion
