= O Corpo Sutil (The Subtle Body) =

Studio album by Arto Lindsay
- Released: 1995
- Genre: Bossa nova
- Length: 34:51
- Labels: Gut; Bar None, Rykodisc
- Producers: Arto Lindsay, Vinicius Cantuária, Patrick Dillett

Arto Lindsay chronology
O Corpo Sutil (The Subtle Body) (1995)	Mundo Civilizado (1996)

O Corpo Sutil (The Subtle Body) is the debut solo album by musician Arto Lindsay, released in 1995.

== Critical reception ==
The Independent wrote that Lindsay "has taken the sand-between-the-toes sound of bossa nova, enrolled colleagues such as Brian Eno, Ryuichi Sakamoto and Bill Frisell to distress it into post-modern form, and set the tunes to his own very effective lyrics and delicate voice." In his book Grown Up All Wrong: 75 Great Rock and Pop Artists from Vaudeville to Techno, Robert Christgau praised the album's lyrics and called it "quiet and traditional-sounding—a formal translation of what samba means to Lusophones like Lindsay, for whom it's a music not just of entrancing groove but of world-class poetry."

William Ruhlmann for AllMusic noted the change of direction Lindsay had taken from his days of leading noise rock bands like DNA, and called it "a charming, restrained record, not the kind of adjectives generally used to describe Lindsay's music before now."

== Track listing ==
All tracks composed by Arto Lindsay and Vinicius Cantuária; except where indicated

1. "4 Skies" (Lindsay, Amadeo Pace)
2. "Child Prodigy" (Lindsay, Caetano Veloso)
3. "Anima Animale" (Lindsay, Towa Tei, Vinicius Cantuária)
4. "Esta Seu Olhar" (Antônio Carlos Jobim)
5. "My Mind is Going" (Joey Baron, Bill Frisell)
6. "Enxugar"
7. "No Meu Soutague"
8. "Unbearable"
9. "Nobody in Bed" (Lindsay, Bill Frisell)
10. "Astronauts"
11. "Sovereign" (Lindsay, Ryuichi Sakamoto)
