= In for a Penny, In for a Pound =

Studio album by Henry Threadgill
- Released: 2015
- Recorded: December 8–9, 2014
- Studios: Systems Two, Brooklyn
- Genre: Jazz
- Length: 79:13
- Label: Pi
- Producer: Liberty Ellman

Henry Threadgill chronology
Tomorrow Sunny / The Revelry, Spp (2012)	In for a Penny, In for a Pound (2015)	Old Locks and Irregular Verbs (2016)

In for a Penny, In for a Pound is an album composed by Henry Threadgill for his jazz quintet Zooid, featuring Jose Davila, Liberty Ellman, Christopher Hoffman, and Elliot Humberto Kavee. It was released by Pi Recordings and was awarded the 2016 Pulitzer Prize for Music.

== Recording and music ==
In for a Penny, In for a Pound was composed by Henry Threadgill and recorded by his band, Zooid. The album, which is a two-disc suite, is composed of six tracks. Threadgill composed a concerto-like piece for each of his band members. However, the album includes improvisation. Patrick Jarenwattananon of National Public Radio describes the style of performance as "contrapuntal improvisation within a specific intervallic framework". Threadgill describes the album using the term "epic".

Jose Davila plays trombone and tuba and is joined on the album by guitarist Liberty Ellman, cellist Christopher Hoffman and drummer Elliot Humberto Kavee. Davila is featured on "Tresepic", Kavee is featured on "Ceroepic", Hoffman is featured on "Dosepic", and Ellman is featured on "Unoepic". Threadgill performs alto saxophone, flute and bass flute within each piece.

== Release and reception ==
Professional ratings
Review scores
Source	Rating
Down Beat	4.5/5 stars
Tom Hull – on the Web	A−

The album was released by Pi Recordings on May 26, 2015. The Wall Street Journal critic Larry Blumenfeld describes the opening piece as "an old song joined in progress". Nate Chinen of The New York Times described the album as brilliant. John Fordham of The Guardian described the work as "welcomingly warm and melodious" despite the "sinewy slipperiness" of the rhythms and tunes. In his review for Down Beat Peter Margasak states, "there are so many fast-moving details and epiphanies at work here that it takes some rigor to hear how it all fits together, even if isolated phrases and sallies are rich in delight."

== Awards ==
The album is the third by a jazz composer to win the Pulitzer Prize for Music (following Wynton Marsalis's Blood on the Fields in 1997 and Ornette Coleman's Sound Grammar in 2007).

== Track listing ==
All compositions by Henry Threadgill.

1. "In for a Penny, In for a Pound (opening)" – 4:35
2. "Ceroepic (for drums and percussion)" – 19:35
3. "Dosepic (for cello)" – 16:00
4. "Off the Prompt Box (exordium)" – 3:35
5. "Tresepic (for trombone and tuba)" – 17:25
6. "Unoepic (for guitar)" – 17:56

== Personnel ==
Adapted from AllMusic.

=== Musicians ===
- Jose Davila – trombone, tuba
- Liberty Ellman – guitar
- Christopher Hoffman – cello, violin
- Elliot Humberto Kavee – drums, percussion
- Henry Threadgill – flute, bass flute, alto saxophone

=== Production ===
- Jules Allen – cover photo
- Liberty Ellman – photography, producer
- Steve Fallone – mastering
- Simon Grendene – design
- Michael Marciano – engineering
- John Rogers – photography
- Seth Rosner – executive producer
- Yulun Wang – executive producer
