= Tomorrow Sunny / The Revelry, Spp =

Studio album by Henry Threadgill
- Released: 2012
- Recorded: December 3 & 4, 2011
- Studio: Brooklyn Recording, Brooklyn
- Genre: Jazz
- Length: 42:20
- Label: Pi Recordings
- Producer: Liberty Ellman

Henry Threadgill chronology
This Brings Us to Volume 2 (2010)	Tomorrow Sunny / The Revelry, Spp (2012)	In for a Penny, In for a Pound (2015)

Tomorrow Sunny / The Revelry, Spp is an album by American jazz saxophonist Henry Threadgill with his band Zooid, featuring Jose Davila on trombone and tuba, Liberty Ellman on guitar, Stomu Takeishi on bass guitar, Elliot Humberto Kavee on drums, and new member Christopher Hoffman on cello, who joined the group making it a sextet. It was recorded in 2011 and released on Pi Recordings.

== Reception ==
Professional ratings
Review scores
Source	Rating
Down Beat	5/5 stars

The Down Beat review by John Corbett states, "With this incarnation of Zooid, Threadgill has yet again found the ideal vehicle for his evolving ideas."

The All About Jazz review by Troy Collins says, "Bolstered by the unswerving dedication of his longstanding sidemen, Tomorrow Sunny / The Revelry, Spp continues the ongoing documentation of Threadgill's Zooid, a consistently fascinating endeavor from one of the most compelling composers of our time."

In a review for PopMatters, John Garratt notes, "Tomorrow Sunny/The Revlery, Spp is the sound of Zooid branching out and out some more. They’re becoming more somber and melodic, more edgy and chaotic, softer and louder, seemingly all at once."

The JazzTimes review by Mike Shanley states, "Everything has a strong sense of direction, even during moments when things sound spare and minimal. As a result, the album comes off as the most focused Zooid release yet."

== Track listing ==
All Compositions by Henry Threadgill

1. "A Day Off" – 5:50
2. "Tomorrow Sunny" – 6:30
3. "So Pleased, No Clue" – 3:34
4. "See the Blackbird Now" – 9:27
5. "Ambient Pressure Thereby" – 10:34
6. "Put On Keep / Frontispiece, Spp" – 6:25

== Personnel ==
- Henry Threadgill – flute, bass flute, alto saxophone
- Liberty Ellman – guitar
- Jose Davila – trombone, tuba
- Christopher Hoffman – cello
- Stomu Takeishi – bass guitar
- Elliot Humberto Kavee – drums
