= Prowl (album) =

Studio album by Erik Friedlander
- Released: February 21, 2006
- Recorded: March 25 & 26, 2005; Castle Oaks Studio, Calabasas, California
- Genre: Avant-garde, jazz, contemporary classical music
- Length: 53:59
- Label: Cryptogramophone CG 127
- Producer: Jeff Gauthier

Erik Friedlander chronology
Maldoror (2003)	Prowl (2006)	Eiger (2007)

Prowl is a 2006 album by cellist Erik Friedlander performing his compositions with the quartet that previously appeared on Topaz which was released on the Cryptogramophone label.

== Reception ==
Professional ratings
Review scores
Source	Rating
Allmusic	4/5 stars
PopMatters	8/10 stars

The Allmusic review by William Tilland awarded the album 4 stars stating "it's clear on this CD that Friedlander has moved well beyond simple virtuosity and has used his compositional skills and the collective talent of his group to capture something much more elusive and valuable. This is music with legs, which reveals new depths and delights even after long exposure. Highly recommended".

PopMatters rated the album 8 out of 10 observing that "Erik Friedlander’s melodies, when he deploys them, go straight to the cerebellum, where they lodge pretty much forever".

Writing for All About Jazz, Troy Collins commented "Topaz, which celebrates its tenth anniversary with this fourth album, has long been Friedlander's primary vehicle for exploring global rhythms in a jazz context, and Prowl delivers evidence of that concept in spades".

David R. Adler stated in JazzTimes that "The group’s main asset is its distinctive sound, which is quasi-electric but without conventional drums. Friedlander’s instrument can freely alternate between bass and melody, arco and pizzicato".

== Track listing ==
All compositions by Erik Friedlander except as indicated

1. "Howling Circle" - 5:14
2. "Anhinga" - 4:55
3. "Prowl" - 5:23
4. "Chanting" - 4:43
5. "7th Sister" - 6:11
6. "Rain Bearers" - 8:04
7. "A Dangerous Game" - 6:37
8. "A Closer Walk with Thee" (Traditional) - 5:55
9. "Najime" - 6:44

== Personnel ==
- Erik Friedlander – cello
- Andy Laster – alto saxophone
- Stomu Takeishi – bass
- Satoshi Takeishi – percussion
