= Ambitious Lovers =

Musical duo

Ambitious Lovers were a musical duo composed of guitarist/singer Arto Lindsay and keyboardist Peter Scherer, active from the mid-1980s to the early 1990s. Their music incorporated elements from Brazilian music and funk. Despite strong reviews from critics for their three albums, Ambitious Lovers found little success with mainstream audiences.

== Band history ==
Lindsay had earlier been active with DNA, a seminal group in New York City's noisy no wave music scene. With Ambitious Lovers, however, Lindsay would reduce the abrasive qualities in his music apart from his own distinctive, untrained guitar style. Instead, Scherer and Lindsay increased the presence of standard pop music elements and conventional songwriting. Notable was a strong influence from Brazilian music and funk, with Lindsay sometimes singing in Portuguese (much of his childhood was in Brazil with his missionary parents).

Envy (1984) was the first of a projected series of albums inspired by the seven deadly sins, though Ambitious Lovers recorded only Greed (1988) and Lust (1991) before disbanding.

Most of their albums featured appearances from many prominent New York-based musicians, including guitarists Marc Ribot, Vernon Reid and Bill Frisell; Brazilian music legend Caetano Veloso; percussionists Nana Vasconcelos and Joey Baron; bassist Melvin Gibbs; and Nile Rodgers.

Their legacy helped promote the modernization and globalization of world music under a singular brand and helped forward careers of many performers, who have since recorded for record labels like Nonesuch Records and Luaka Bop.

Their song "It Only Has to Happen Once" was featured in the 1990 film Wild Orchid.

== Discography ==
- 1984 - Envy (EG/Caroline)
- 1988 - Greed (Virgin/EMI)
- 1991 - Lust (Elektra/Warner)
