= Up Popped the Two Lips =

Studio album by Henry Threadgill
- Released: 2001
- Recorded: April 28–30, 2001
- Genre: Jazz
- Label: Pi Recordings
- Producer: Henry Threadgill

Henry Threadgill chronology
Everybodys Mouth's a Book (2001)	Up Popped the Two Lips (2001)	Pop Start the Tape, Stop (2005)

Up Popped the Two Lips is an album by Henry Threadgill featuring seven of Threadgill's compositions performed by Threadgill's Zooid. The album was the second album on the Pi Records label and was released simultaneously with Everybodys Mouth's a Book by Threadgill & Make a Move in 2001.

== Reception ==
Both of Threadgill's initial Pi Recordings releases attracted critical approval. The Allmusic review by Thom Jurek awarded the album 4 stars, stating, "This is a fun, deft, and smart record. Threadgill is more on his game as a composer and as a bandleader than at any point in his career." The All About Jazz review by Glenn Astarita stated, "it is a joy to delve into the band's multidirectional evolutionary processes." The Boston Phoenix's Ed Hazell stated, "Threadgill has mixed these elements before, but not all in one working band, and he’s rarely given himself as much solo room in music so heavily composed."

Professional ratings
Review scores
Source	Rating
Allmusic	4/5 stars
The Penguin Guide to Jazz Recordings	3/4 stars

== Track listing ==
All compositions by Henry Threadgill

1. "Tickled Pink" - 6:54
2. "Dark Black" - 5:26
3. "Look" - 4:54
4. "Around My Goose" - 8:00
5. "Calm Down" - 5:35
6. "Did You See That" - 7:43
7. "Do the Needful" - 6:53

Recorded at Orange Music Sound Studio, West Orange, NJ, on April 28, 29 & 30, 2001

== Personnel ==
- Henry Threadgill - alto saxophone, flute
- Liberty Ellman - acoustic guitar
- Tarik Benbrahim - oud
- José Davila - tuba
- Dana Leong - cello
- Dafnis Prieto - drums
