= Apollo Up! =

- Origin: Nashville, Tennessee, U.S.
- Genres: Alternative rock; indie rock; punk rock; pop punk; post-punk revival; post-hardcore
- Years active: 2002–2008
- Label: Theory 8
- Spinoff of: Lotushalo, Shiboleth, On Command
- Members: Jay Leo Phillips; Mike Shepherd; Jereme Frey

Apollo Up! is an American post-punk/pop punk/indie band based in Nashville, Tennessee. Billboard described the band as post-hardcore. Their sound has been compared to Ted Leo and the Pharmacists, and Fugazi.

Singer/guitarist Jay Leo Phillips, bassist Mike Shepherd, and drummer Jereme Frey, each former or ongoing members of local bands Lotushalo, Shiboleth, On Command, and Forget Cassettes, formed the band in late 2002. Their debut album, Light the End and Burn It Through, was released by indie label Theory 8 Records in January 2004.

Phillips divided his activities between Apollo Up! and dream pop trio Forget Cassettes, touring with both bands and working on the latter's second album, Salt, before concentrating on Apollo's second release, Chariots of Fire in June 2006. The group continued to gig locally and toured, playing, among other venues, at Cincinnati's Desdemona Festival in 2006. The band released a 5-song EP, Walking Papers, in 2008.
