= Salt (Arto Lindsay album) =

Studio album by Arto Lindsay
- Released: May 11, 2004
- Label: Righteous Babe
- Producer: Melvin Gibbs, Kassin, Berna Ceppas, Arto Lindsay

Arto Lindsay chronology
Invoke (2002)	Salt (2004)	Scarcity (2013)

Salt is an album by the American musician Arto Lindsay, released on May 11, 2004.

== Production ==
Recorded at Lindsay's New York City apartment and at his house in Salvador, Brazil, the album was produced by Melvin Gibbs, Kassin, Berna Ceppas, and Lindsay. It originated as a soundtrack for a parade that Lindsay was planning with the artist Matthew Barney. Vernon Reid played guitar on a few tracks. Lindsay sang in Portuguese and English, sometimes alternating languages in the same song. "Personagem" is performed in a bossa nova style; other songs were influenced by music originating in the favelas of Brazil.

== Critical reception ==
Professional ratings
Review scores
Source	Rating
AllMusic	4/5 stars
The Boston Globe	3/5 stars
Robert Christgau	A−
Pitchfork	6.5/10
Uncut	1.5/5 stars

The Guardian said that Salt "includes some appealing grooves and tunes: 'Personagem', with its attractive horn arrangement; the breezy 'Kamo (Dark Stripe)'; the catchy 'Combustivel'... But it doesn't have the spark of those earlier Ryko albums." The Washington Post stated that "the weird sounds burbling beneath songs such as 'Habite em Mim' and "Personagem" simply add to the atmosphere, which is fostered by the cool sophistication of a handful of regular Lindsay collaborators". The Boston Globe noted that Lindsay "prefers to sketch rough ideas and then color them in with his crystalline tenor." The Chicago Tribune listed Salt as one of the 10 best "underheard" albums of 2004. Uncut dismissed the album as "more avant-cocktail lounge music".

== Track listing ==
No.	Title	Length
1.	"Habite em Mim"
2.	"Kamo (Dark Stripe)"
3.	"Personagem"
4.	"Twins"
5.	"Into Shade"
6.	"Jardim da Alma"
7.	"De Lama Lâmina"
8.	"Combustível"
9.	"Make That Sound"
10.	"Salt"
