= In for a Penny (disambiguation) =

"In for a Penny" is a 1975 single by Slade from Nobody's Fools.

In for a Penny may also refer to:

== Television ==
- In for a Penny (game show), a British television programme
- "In for a Penny...", a 2011 season 6 episode of American series Psych
- "In for a Penny", 2004 season 1 episode of Canadian series Zixx
- A 1968 season 2 episode of Australian series Contrabandits
- In for a Penny, a 1972 London Weekend Television sitcom starring Bob Todd

== Music ==
- In for a Penny, 1981 album from Arabesque

== See also ==
- In for a Penny, In for a Pound (disambiguation)
