= This Brings Us to Volume 1 =

Studio album by Henry Threadgill
- Released: 2009
- Recorded: November 2008
- Genre: Jazz
- Label: Pi Recordings
- Producer: Henry Threadgill

Henry Threadgill chronology
Pop Start the Tape, Stop (2005)	This Brings Us to Volume 1 (2009)	This Brings Us to Volume 2 (2010)

This Brings Us to Volume 1 is an album by Henry Threadgill featuring six of Threadgill's compositions performed by Threadgill's Zooid. The album, Threadgill's first in eight years besides the limited edition Pop Start the Tape, Stop (2005), was released on the Pi Recordings label in 2009.

== Reception ==
Professional ratings
Review scores
Source	Rating
AllMusic	3.5/5 stars

The album was selected as one of the best jazz recordings of the year by The New York Times, The Wall Street Journal and PopMatters.

The AllMusic review by Michael G. Nastos stated: "A most unique combination of musicians that collectively sounds like no other modern jazz ensemble, Threadgill's Zooid must be heard to be appreciated, especially live, as the studio does not do the band justice." The All About Jazz review by Troy Collins stated, "Threadgill unfurls fluid variations from his vocally expressive flute on the first half of the album, tortuous bluesy cadences from his acerbic alto on the second".

== Track listing ==
All compositions by Henry Threadgill

1. "White Wednesday Off the Wall" - 4:57
2. "To Undertake My Corners Open" - 8:40
3. "Chairmaster" - 7:42
4. "After Some Time" - 8:40
5. "Sap" - 4:57
6. "Mirror Mirror the Verb" - 3:20

Recorded at Brooklyn Recording, Brooklyn, New York, in November 2008

== Personnel ==
- Henry Threadgill - alto saxophone, flute
- Liberty Ellman - acoustic guitar
- Stomu Takeishi - bass guitar
- José Davila - trombone, tuba
- Elliot Humberto Kavee - drums
