= Mundo Civilizado =

Studio album by Arto Lindsay
- Released: May 20, 1997
- Genre: Art pop, bossa nova, tropicália, jazz pop, experimental rock
- Length: 40:24
- Label: Bar None, Rykodisc
- Producer: Arto Lindsay with C-n-A (Andrés Levin and Camus Maré Celli)

Arto Lindsay chronology
O Corpo Sutil (The Subtle Body) (1996)	Mundo Civilizado (1997)	Noon Chill (1997)

Mundo Civilizado is the second solo album by American musician Arto Lindsay.

== Critical reception ==
Professional ratings
Review scores
Source	Rating
AllMusic	4/5 stars
Chicago Tribune	4/4 stars
Christgau's Consumer Guide	A+
Entertainment Weekly	A

Rock critic Robert Christgau lauded Mundo Civilizado as "a fragile, lyrical, sly, beatwise, embarrassingly beautiful cross-cultural appropriation that just goes to show how people grow up and settle down even when they don't." He named the album his favorite of 1997 in the annual Pazz & Jop poll published by The Village Voice, and in 2021, he named it among the 10 best albums from the 1990s.

== Track listing ==
1. "Complicity" – 4:07
2. "Q Samba" – 3:27
3. "Simply Beautiful" (Al Green cover) – 3:59
4. "Mundo Civilizado" – 4:24
5. "Titled" – 3:19
6. "Horizontal" – 3:32
7. "Mar da Gávea" – 2:43
8. "Imbassaí" – 3:18
9. "Pleasure" – 2:38
10. "Erotic City" (Prince cover) – 5:02
11. "Clown" – 3:50
