= Greed (Ambitious Lovers album) =

Studio album by Ambitious Lovers
- Released: 1988
- Recorded: Skyline, Creative Audio, Platinum Island, Nas Nuvens Rio De Janeiro and Cianni Musica, New York City, NY
- Length: 40:49
- Label: Virgin
- Producer: Peter Scherer

Ambitious Lovers chronology
Envy (1984)	Greed (1988)	Lust (1991)

Greed is the second album by Ambitious Lovers, released in 1988 through Virgin Records. Naná Vasconcelos and John Zorn were among the album's many guest musicians.

== Critical reception ==
Professional ratings
Review scores
Source	Rating
AllMusic	4.5/5 stars
Christgau's Record Guide	A
The Philadelphia Inquirer	3/4 stars

The Philadelphia Inquirer wrote that "Lindsay and Scherer tame their clattering compositional talents just enough to create a series of attractively funky rock songs." The Washington Post deemed the album "samba-punk." The State determined that "songs like 'Copy Me', ' 'Privacy' and 'Love Overlap' are urban dance tunes that feature melodic choruses that seem especially smooth when sandwiched between steamy funk."

== Track listing ==
All tracks are written by Arto Lindsay and Peter Scherer, except "Para Não Contrariar Voce" by Paulinho da Viola.

No.	Title	Length
1.	"Copy Me"	3:45
2.	"Privacy"	3:48
3.	"Caso"	2:40
4.	"King"	4:38
5.	"Omotesando"	1:36
6.	"Too Far"	3:03
7.	"Love Overlap"	4:42
8.	"Admit It"	3:44
9.	"Steel Wool"	1:03
10.	"Para Não Contrariar Voce"	2:38
11.	"Quasi You"	4:24
12.	"It Only Has to Happen Once"	3:42
13.	"Dot Stuff"	1:04

== Personnel ==
Ambitious Lovers

- Arto Lindsay – vocals, guitar
- Peter Scherer – keyboards, synthesizer bass, drum programming, sampling, production

Additional musicians

- Joey Baron – drums on "Steel Wool" and "Para Não Contrariar Voce"
- D.K. Dyson – backing vocals
- Bill Frisell – guitar on "Steel Wool" and "Para Não Contrariar Voce"
- Gail Lou – backing vocals
- Vernon Reid – guitar on "Copy Me", "Privacy" and "Love Overlap"
- Naná Vasconcelos – percussion, vocals on "Copy Me" and "It Only Has to Happen Once"
- John Zorn – saxophone on "Privacy" and "Admit It"

Production

- Knut Bohn – additional recording
- Ed Brooks – assistant engineering
- John Cicchitti – assistant engineering
- Vitor Farias – additional recording
- Keith Freedman – assistant engineering, additional recording
- Oz Fritz – assistant engineering
- Eric Hurtig – additional recording
- Bob Ludwig – mastering
- Francis Manzella – additional recording
- Roger Moutenot – assistant engineering, mixing, recording
- UE Nastasi – assistant engineering
- Paula Zanes – art direction, photography
- Dary Sulich – assistant engineering
