= Harriet Tubman (band) =

American jazz-based band

- Origin: New York City, U.S.
- Genres: Jazz; doom-jazz; avant-rock
- Years active: 1998–present
- Labels: Knitting Factory Works; Avant; Sunnyside; Pi Recordings
- Members: Melvin Gibbs; Brandon Ross; J.T. Lewis

Harriet Tubman is an American jazz-based band, formed in New York City in 1998 by bassist Melvin Gibbs, guitarist Brandon Ross, and percussionist J.T. Lewis. The trio is named after abolitionist Harriet Tubman. The band's music is a "unique blend of electronic jazz, rock and funk".

In 1998, Harriet Tubman released its debut album I Am a Man. The record was followed by Prototype in 2000, Ascension in 2011, Araminta in 2017 (featuring trumpeter Wadada Leo Smith), The Terror End of Beauty in 2018, and Electrical Field of Love in 2026 (with Georgia Anne Muldrow). Ascension was on PopMatters' Best Jazz of 2011 list, while The Terror End of Beauty was on No Depression's Best Jazz Albums of 2018 list.

== Discography ==
- I Am a Man (1998)
- Prototype (2000)
- Ascension (2011)
- Araminta (2017)
- The Terror End of Beauty (2018)
- Electrical Field of Love (2026) (with Georgia Anne Muldrow)
