= Arto Lindsay =

American guitarist, singer, and composer

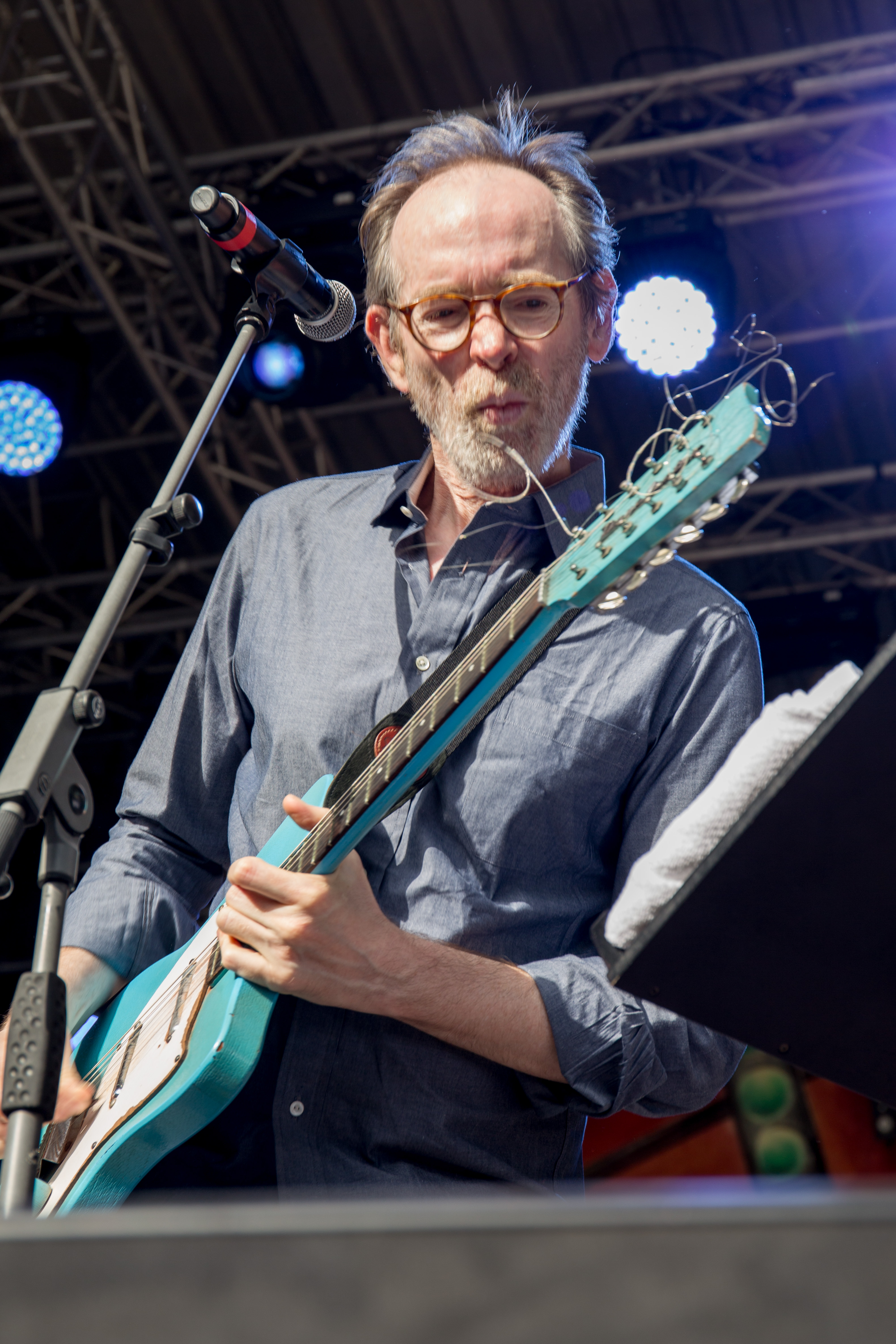
- Lindsay in 2014

Background information
- Born: Arthur Morgan Lindsay; May 28, 1953 (age 73)
- Origin: Richmond, Virginia, U.S.
- Genres: No wave; noise; avant-garde jazz; MPB; art pop
- Occupations: Composer; musician; record producer
- Instruments: Guitar; vocals
- Labels: ZE; Righteous Babe
- Formerly of: Ambitious Lovers; DNA; The Golden Palominos; The Lounge Lizards
- Website: artolindsay.com

Arthur Morgan "Arto" Lindsay (born May 28, 1953) is an American guitarist, singer, record producer and experimental composer. He was a member of the pioneering 1970s no wave group DNA, which featured on the 1978 compilation No New York. In the 1980s, he formed the group Ambitious Lovers. He also performed with the Golden Palominos and the Lounge Lizards.

He has a distinctive soft voice and an often noisy, self-taught guitar style consisting almost entirely of unconventional extended techniques, described by Brian Olewnick as "studiedly naïve ... sounding like the bastard child of Derek Bailey".

== Early life and career ==
Although Lindsay was born in the United States, he grew up in Brazil. His parents were Christian missionaries in the state of Pernambuco, and he speaks fluent Brazilian Portuguese. He returned to the United States in the mid-1970s to attend college.

In the late 1970s, he helped form the no wave band DNA with Ikue Mori and Robin Crutchfield, although Tim Wright of Pere Ubu soon replaced Crutchfield. In 1978, DNA was featured on the four-band sampler No New York (produced by Brian Eno).

In the early 1980s, Lindsay performed on early albums by The Lounge Lizards and The Golden Palominos. "He's never lost his interest in weirdness," journalist Robert Christgau wrote, "even ran the Kitchen for a year, and in the eighties his unschooled guitar was in demand all over downtown as he radiated out from the overlapping John Lurie, Anton Fier, John Zorn, and Kip Hanrahan circles to enterprising jazz and funk guys as well as Cuban drummers..." Bassist Melvin Gibbs met Lindsay in 1979, and they worked together musically for the first time in 1984 and many times in the decades since. Lindsay described Gibbs as his "closest collaborator."

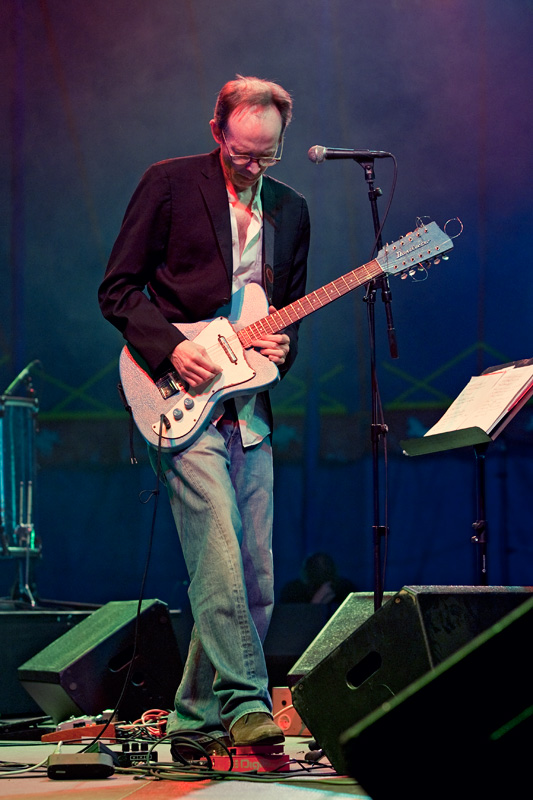
Arto Lindsay, Moers Festival 2010

After the Lounge Lizards, Lindsay and keyboardist Peter Scherer formed the Ambitious Lovers, influenced by pop, samba, and bossa nova. In an interview with Bomb magazine, Linsday said, "the whole idea was Al Green and samba. That against this; this against that; not a blend, a juxtaposition, loud/soft. There's no particular point in putting these things together. The point is what comes out in the end." The band's albums included Envy, Greed, and Lust.

== Producer ==
Lindsay began his experience as producer in 1981 working with Italian No wave band Hi-Fi Bros. He has produced recordings by Brazilian musicians Caetano Veloso, Tom Zé, Vinicius Cantuária, Gal Costa, Carlinhos Brown, Marisa Monte, Adriana Calcanhotto, Orquestra Contemporânea de Olinda and Lucas Santtana. He also co-produced the first album of Anarchist Republic of Bzzz, and CHASM by Ryuichi Sakamoto.

== Collaborations ==
Lindsay lent his talents to the 1993 opera Agamemnon and to Jun Miyake's Stolen From Strangers album (2008), providing vocals and guitar on the album's opener "Alviveride" as well as on "O Fim", "Turn Back" and "Outros Escuros". For Performa 09, the third edition of the Performa Biennial, Lindsay created Somewhere I Read collaborating with the choreographer Lily Baldwin. In 2013, Lindsay sang on "I Guess We're Floating" by Stephon Alexander and Rioux. The song was released on the album Here Comes Now in August 2014 by Connect Records.

== Exhibition ==
- netmage 2006 performs Ipanema Théories with Dominique Gonzalez Foerster and alone Garden of self regard

== Discography ==
More or less comprehensive, this discography integrates all recordings as a leader, band projects and contributions to albums by other musicians. Lindsay's own work can simply be singled out by sorting "Leading artist". Minor contributions may only be mentioned in the notes of an earlier album of the respective artist. The No New York compilation is added due to its significance. Later compilations of older material are listed with the recording year followed by the release date in brackets. Within a year the albums are sorted alphabetically by artist not by specified dates. (Leading artist sorts by first name.)

Date	Leading artist or band	Album	Label	Notes
1978	DNA	No New York	Antilles	compilation by Brian Eno. A single produced by Robert Quine was released the same year: "You & You" (Medical, 1978)
1978 [2003]	Arto/Neto and Pill Factory	N.Y No Wave - The Ultimate East Village 80's Soundtrack	ZE	compilation with single „Pini Pini“/„Malú“ with S. Neto (=Seth Tillet) and a track by Pill Factory for the film Grutzi Elvis by Diego Cortez
1979 [1985]	The Lounge Lizards	Live 79-81	ROIR	only on MC, LP/CD reissue in 1990. Liner notes by Jim Jarmusch
1980	Peter Gordon & Love of Life Orchestra	Extended Niceties	Infidelity	plays guitar on two of four tracks (besides David Byrne), 12" single
1980−83 [2008]	Toy Killers	The Unlistenable Years	ugExplode	project by Mark E. Miller and Charles K. Noyes recorded at The Kitchen, the OAO Studio and elsewhere
1981	DNA	A Taste of DNA	American Clave	
1981	The Lounge Lizards	The Lounge Lizards	Editions EG	
1981	Kip Hanrahan	Coup de tête	American Clave	
1982 [1993]	DNA	Last Live at CBGB's	Avant	recorded June 25, 1982, at CBGB's
1983	The Golden Palominos	The Golden Palominos	Celluloid	Lindsay is also guest on "I.D. (Like a Version)", B-side of single "Omaha", and Visions of Excess both Celluloid, 1985
1983	Kip Hanrahan	Desire Develops an Edge	American Clave	
1983	John Zorn	Locus Solus	Rift	reissued on Eva (Jp) in 1991 and on Tzadik in 1997
1984	Ambitious Lovers	Envy	Editions EG	credited as "Arto Lindsay Ambitious Lovers", co-produced by M. E. Miller and Peter Scherer
1984	David Moss	Full House	Moers Music	
1984	Arto Lindsay, John Zorn, Wayne Horvitz and M. E. Miller	That's the Way I Feel Now - A Tribute to Thelonious Monk	A&M	compilation with "Shuffle Boil"
1985	Kip Hanrahan	Vertical's Currency	American Clave	
1985	John Lurie	Music from the Original Scores: Stranger Than Paradise and the Resurrection of Albert Ayler	Crammed Discs, Made to Measure	only on "The Resurrection of Albert Ayler"
1985	David Moss	Dense Band	Moers Music	
1985	Ryuichi Sakamoto	Esperanto	MIDI Inc.	Lindsay plays guitar, also on "Parolibre" of following Futurista (MIDI Inc., 1986)
1986	Arto Lindsay	Godard, ça vous chante?	Nato (F)	compilation with two quartet pieces featuring Lucy Hamilton, Clint Ruin and Roli Mosimann (also includes Zorn's "Godard" w/o Lindsay)
1986	John Zorn	The Big Gundown	Nonesuch	subtitle John Zorn Plays the Music of Ennio Morricone
1986 [1990]	John Zorn	Filmworks 1986–1990	Eva (Jp)	Lindsay on first four tracks for White and Lazy. Also on two tracks from 1990 released on Filmworks III: 1990–1995
1987	John Lurie	Down by Law	Crammed Discs, Made to Measure	Soundtrack to the Jim Jarmush film, featuring Lurie beside Tom Waits and Roberto Benigni as lead actors
1987	John Zorn	Cobra	Hat Hut	only studio recording
1988	Ambitious Lovers	Greed	Virgin	
1988	Heiner Goebbels/Heiner Müller	Der Mann im Fahrstuhl/The Man in the Elevator	ECM	
1989	Laurie Anderson	Strange Angels	Warner Bros.	produced in part by Lindsay and Scherer. Lindsay also sings on the title track of her following album Bright Red (1994)
1989	Bill Frisell	Before We Were Born	Elektra/Musician	
1989	Allen Ginsberg	The Lion for Real	Antilles/Island	Hal Wilner project
1989	Seigen Ono	Comme des Garçons, Volume One	Venture	Lindsay also is guest musician and producer on The Green Chinese Table (1988) and Comme des Garçons, Volume Two (1989)
1989	Ryuichi Sakamoto	Beauty	Virgin	Lindsay also sings on "Psychedelic Afternoon" of his following album Sweet Revenge (1994) and plays guitar on "Bibounoaozora" of the next, Smoochy (Güt/For Life, 1996)
1989	Caetano Veloso	Estrangeiro	Elektra/Musician	produced by Lindsay and Peter Scherer
1989	John Zorn	Cynical Hysterie Hour	CBS/Sony (Jp)	on "Bubblin' Singin'"; rereleased on Tzadik in 1997 as Filmworks VII: Cynical Hysterie Hour
1990	Ambitious Lovers as Peter Scherer & Arto Lindsay	Pretty Ugly	Crammed Discs, Made to Measure	music for a ballett choreographed by Amanda Miller
1990	Marisa Monte	Mais	EMI	produced album
1990	Marc Ribot	Rootless Cosmopolitans	Island	
1990	They Might Be Giants	Flood	Elektra	Lindsay on one track
1991	Ambitious Lovers	Lust	Elektra	
1991	Marisa Monte	Mais	EMI/World Pacific	produced by Lindsay, debut album by Monte, features Ribot, Zorn a.o.
1991	Caetano Veloso	Circuladô	Elektra/Nonesuch	produced by Lindsay
1992	Davis Moss	Dense Band	Moers Music	
1992	Tom Zé	The Hips of Tradition - The Return of Tom Zé	Luaka Bop/Warner Bros.	co-produced; translated his songs for 1990 Luaka Bop compilation Brazil Classics 4: Tom Zé
1993	Arnaldo Antunes	Nome	RCA	
1993	Gal Costa	O Sorriso do Gato de Alice	RCA	produced by Lindsay
1994	David Byrne	David Byrne	Luaka Bop/Warner Bros.	
1994	Marisa Monte	Verde, Anil, Amarelo, Cor de Rosa e Carvão	EMI	produced album
1995	Arto Lindsay Trio	Aggregates 1–26	Knitting Factory	trio with Melvin Gibbs and Dougie Bowne
1995	Arto Lindsay	O Corpo Sutil (The Subtle Body)	Güt/For Life (Jp), Bar/None	first solo album after the Ambitious Lovers, features prominently Bill Frisell
1996	Carlinhos Brown	Alfagamabetizado	EMI/Delabel	produced in part by Lindsay (other half by Wally Badarou)
1996	Vinicius Cantuaria	Sol na Cara	Gramavision	produced by Lindsay
1996	Arto Lindsay	Mundo Civilizado	Güt/For Life (Jp), Bar/None	co-produced by Andres Levin, Camus Celli. Illbient remixes on Hyper Civilizado (Gütbounce/Gramavision)
1994	Marisa Monte	Barulhinho Bom	EMI	co-produced with Carlinhos Brown and Monte
1997	Taeko Onuki	LUCY	USM Japan	produced and co-arranged the song Mon doux Soleil with Ryuichi Sakamoto
1997	Arto Lindsay	Noon Chill	Güt/For Life (Jp), Bar/None	co-produced by Andres Levin, Melvin Gibbs, Pat Dillett and 7 Cycle. Rykodisc issued a limited edition in 1998 adding the EP Reentry, first released in Japan on Güt
1998	Vinicius Cantuaria	Tucumã	Verve	Lindsay co-wrote "Maravilhar" and "Sanfona", and plays guitar on "Vivo Isolado do Mundo"
1998	Seigen Ono	Comme des Garçons + Remix Arto Lindsay	Epic/Sony	re-release with added remixes
1999	Arto Lindsay	Prize	Righteous Babe	co-produced by Andres Levin and Melvin Gibbs
1999	Piccola Orchestra Avion Travel	Cirano	Sugar	producer
2000	Arto Lindsay	Ecomixes	Avex Trax	compilation of remixes and four live tracks
2000	Marisa Monte	Memórias, Crônicas, e Declarações de Amor	EMI/Phonomotor	co-produced with Monte
2002	Arto Lindsay	Invoke	Righteous Babe	co-produced by Andres Levin and Melvin Gibbs, two tracks by Kassin and Berna Ceppas
2002	Jun Miyake	Innocent Bossa in the Mirror	Nektar/Tropical Music	co-produced and sings
2004	Arto Lindsay	Salt	Righteous Babe	co-produced by Melvin Gibbs, Kassin and Berna Ceppas
2008	Adriana Calcanhotto	Mare	Sony/BMG	co-producer, plays drums and guitar on two tracks
2008	Jun Miyake	Stolen from Strangers	Videoarts Music	
2009	Anarchist Republic of Bzzz	Anarchist Republic of Bzzz	Sub Rosa	co-producer with head Seb El Zin, and plays guitar
2013	Arto Lindsay, Paal Nilssen-Love	Scarcity	PNL	12"/CD
2014	Arto Lindsay	Encyclopedia of Arto	Northern Spy	compilation with a second CD comprising solo live recordings
2016	Anarchist Republic of Bzzz	United Diktaturs of Europe	Bzzz	plays guitar
2017	Arto Lindsay	Cuidado Madame	Northern Spy/P-Vine (Jp)	again with Melvin Gibbs, features drummer Kassa Overall
2019	Arto Lindsay, Ken Vandermark, Joe McPhee, Phil Sudderberg	Largest Afternoon	Corbett vs. Dempsey	
2022	Arto Lindsay	Charivari	Corbett vs. Dempsey	solo recording
