= Envy (Ambitious Lovers album) =

Studio album by Ambitious Lovers
- Released: 1984
- Recorded: BC Studio, Brooklyn, NY
- Genre: New wave
- Length: 32:46
- Label: E.G.
- Producer: Arto Lindsay, M. E. Miller and Peter Scherer

Ambitious Lovers chronology
| Envy (1984) | Greed (1988) |

Professional ratings
Review scores
| Source | Rating |
|---|---|
| AllMusic | 3/5 stars |
| Robert Christgau | A |
| The Encyclopedia of Popular Music | 3/5 stars |
| The Rolling Stone Album Guide | 3/5 stars |

Envy is the debut album by Ambitious Lovers. It was released in 1984 through E.G. Records. The album marked the first entry in what, at one point, was supposed to be a seven-album series on the seven deadly sins.

== Production ==
Arto Lindsay, who grew up in Brazil, incorporates on the album many elements of that country's heritage. Most of the music was written by keyboardist Peter Scherer.

== Critical reception ==
Trouser Press wrote that "Lindsay’s words are tantalizingly oblique, but there’s nothing oblique about his record’s lusty cry for recognition." Maximum Rocknroll called the album "slick and subdued," writing that Lindsey is "one of the few improv dudes who can make you laugh." MusicHound Rock: The Essential Album Guide called it "shocking in its juxtapositions."

John Leland of Spin called it, "the most generous and appealing work Lindsay has ever done. He brings his formerly anti-pop trademarks — demented, chicken-scratch guitar, fragmented lyrics, idiosyncratic compositions, choppy rhythms — intact into a contemporary pop format."

== Track listing ==
Side one
| No. | Title | Writer(s) | Length |
|---|---|---|---|
| 1. | "Cross Your Legs" | Lindsay, Miller, Scherer | 5:05 |
| 2. | "Trouble Maker" | Lindsay, Miller, Scherer | 2:25 |
| 3. | "Pagode Americano" | Fernandes, Nogueira, Silva | 2:12 |
| 4. | "Nothing's Monstered" | Lindsay, Miller, Moss | 1:00 |
| 5. | "Crowning Roar" | Lindsay, Miller | 1:00 |
| 6. | "Too Many Mansions" | Lindsay, Miller, Scherer | 3:52 |

Side two
| No. | Title | Writer(s) | Length |
|---|---|---|---|
| 1. | "Let's Be Adult" | Lindsay, Scherer | 4:18 |
| 2. | "Venus Lost Her Shirt" | Fernandes, Lindsay, Miller, Nogueira, Scherer, Silva | 1:55 |
| 3. | "My Competition" | Lindsay, Miller | 0:45 |
| 4. | "Badú" | Nogueira, Silva, Silva | 1:06 |
| 5. | "Dora" | Caymmi | 2:55 |
| 6. | "Beberibe" | Lindsay, Nogueira | 1:00 |
| 7. | "Locus Coruleus" | Fier, Lindsay, Scherer | 5:06 |

== Sampling ==
The hook in "Let's Be Adult" is also in the song "Song 4 Mutya (Out of Control)" by Groove Armada.

== Personnel ==
Ambitious Lovers

- Arto Lindsay – vocals, guitar, production
- Peter Scherer – Yamaha DX7, Synclavier, synthesizer bass, sampling, production

Additional musicians and production

- Martin Bisi – mixing, recording
- Reinaldo Fernandes – vocals, repinique
- Mark E. Miller – Oberheim DMX, tom-toms, backing vocals, production
- Robert Musso – mastering
- David Moss – voice
- Toni Nogueira – surdo, timpani
- Claudio Silva – pandeiro
- Jorge Silva – repinique
- Seth Tillett – art direction
- Howie Weinberg – mastering
