= Skin (Erik Friedlander album) =

Studio album by Erik Friedlander
- Released: February 15, 2000
- Recorded: June 8 and 9, 1999; Clinton Recording Studios, New York, NY
- Genre: Avant-garde, jazz, contemporary classical music
- Length: 53:38
- Label: Siam SMD-50008
- Producer: Erik Friedlander

Erik Friedlander chronology
Topaz (1998)	Skin (2000)	Grains of Paradise (2001)

Skin is a 2000 album by cellist Erik Friedlander which was released on the Siam label and features the quartet that previously appeared on Topaz. The album was also released as a DVD

== Reception ==
Professional ratings
Review scores
Source	Rating
AllMusic	4/5 stars
The Penguin Guide to Jazz Recordings	3/4 stars

The AllMusic review by Michael G. Nastos awarded the album 4 stars stating "Because Friedlander explores many avenues of improvisation and composition, he can't be pegged; his work doesn't fit into a definable bag. You could call it great modern music, and that would be enough. The sounds are challenging, eminently accessible, and definitely compelling, marking more progress in this marvelous musician's burgeoning career. Highly recommended, and a step beyond his previous CD, Topaz".

Writing for All About Jazz, David Adler commented "Friedlander at times deploys his cello as though it were a second horn, joining Andy Laster's alto sax for the seductive harmonies of Mancini's "Susan." Elsewhere the cellist takes on a bass-like role, complementing the unpredictable twists and turns of bassist Stomu Takeishi".

Bill Bennett stated in JazzTimes that "The joys of this recording are many, and Friedlander is a bandleader to watch".

== Track listing ==
All compositions by Erik Friedlander except as indicated

1. "Split Screen" - 6:28
2. "Susan" (Henry Mancini) - 3:16
3. "Life, In-Line" - 3:34
4. "Skin 1" (Julius Hemphill) - 6:41
5. "Sahel Va Danya" (Googoosh) - 4:57
6. "Reflections" - 3:47
7. "Fekunk" - 6:21
8. "White Mountain" - 5:06
9. "Doomwatcher" - 6:01
10. "Eclipse" (Charles Mingus) - 3:39
11. "Golden Dawn" (Carlos Santana) - 3:42

== Personnel ==
- Erik Friedlander – cello
- Andy Laster – alto saxophone
- Stomu Takeishi – bass
- Satoshi Takeishi – percussion
- Alexander Fedoriouk – cimbalom
- The Atlas Cello Quartet: Bruce Wang, Christine Gummere, Karl R. Derricho, Peter Sanders – cello
