= Leroy Jenkins Live! =

Live album by Leroy Jenkins
- Released: 1993
- Recorded: March 15, 1992
- Venue: P.S. 122, New York City
- Genre: Jazz
- Length: 51:54
- Label: Black Saint; 120122-2
- Producer: Leroy Jenkins

Leroy Jenkins chronology
Urban Blues (1984)	Leroy Jenkins Live! (1993)	Themes & Improvisations on the Blues (1994)

Leroy Jenkins Live! is a live album by violinist / composer Leroy Jenkins. It was recorded in March 1992 at P.S. 122 in New York City, and was released by Black Saint in 1993. On the album, Jenkins is joined by guitarist Brandon Ross, synthesizer player Eric Johnson, bassist Hill Greene, and drummer Reggie Nicholson. The album is subtitled "featuring Computer Minds."

== Reception ==
Professional ratings
Review scores
Source	Rating
AllMusic	3/5 stars
The Penguin Guide to Jazz	3.5/4 stars
The Rolling Stone Jazz & Blues Album Guide	3.5/5 stars

The authors of the Penguin Guide to Jazz Recordings awarded the album 3.5 stars, stating: "The live session completely merits the exclamation mark. It's a fierce, urgent session, recorded in a New York public school, and sounds appropriately in contact with what's going on in the streets."

A review in the MusicHound Jazz Guide commented: "The energy level throughout is taut yet explosive, with special kudos to 'Static in the Attic and 'Computer Minds'."

== Track listing ==
All compositions by Leroy Jenkins.

1. "Bird, Eddie, And Monk" - 9:42
2. "A Prayer" - 5:31
3. "Static In The Attic" - 8:15
4. "Computer Minds" - 4:44
5. "Looking For The Blues" - 6:57
6. "Chicago" - 13:40
7. "Jehovah Theme" - 3:05
- Recorded March 15, 1992 at P.S. 122, New York City.

== Personnel ==
- Leroy Jenkins – violin
- Brandon Ross – guitar
- Eric Johnson – synthesizer
- Hill Greene – bass
- Reggie Nicholson – drums
