= Salting (initiation ceremony) =

Englisg initiation ceremony

Saltings were festive ceremonies which, in the 16th and 17th centuries, initiated University of Cambridge and Oxford freshmen into the academic and social communities of their individual colleges. Humorous speeches by one or more sophisters (second- or third-year students) introduced first-year students to the assembled college society. Relatively little is known about the conventions governing these entertainments; when the tradition died out in the mid-17th century, most of the performance details were lost as well.

== Contemporary accounts ==
Saltings seem to have been performed, with periodic lapses, in various colleges in both universities for over one hundred and fifty years. The earliest known reference to the custom, dated 1509–10, is the record of a salting payment made by John Fisher on behalf of his protégé Gilbert Latham of Christ's College, Cambridge. The latest dated reference is Anthony Wood's reminiscent account of his own salting ceremony at Merton College, Oxford in 1647–8. Wood states that the tradition, at least at Oxford, had fallen into disuse by the time of the Restoration.

At Cambridge salting ceremonies, the "father" delivered a speech in verse addressing each of his "sons" in turn – punning on names, joking about appearances, highlighting personal traits or idiosyncrasies, or telling witty anecdotes about each one. The freshmen were apparently sometimes required to respond, but whether their ripostes were meant to be prepared or extemporaneous is unclear.

== Official reaction ==
Salting nights were occasions for great celebration and were evidently notorious for their rowdiness. Simonds D'Ewes reported that at a Pembroke salting, "a great deal of beer, as at all such meetings, was drunk" and that after an evening of overindulgence, he "got but little rest during the night"; which had the salutary effect of making him cautious ever after, as he had never been before, "to avoid all nimiety of this kind." Not surprisingly, this kind of skylarking provoked prohibitive reactions from the authorities. The Elizabethan statutes of Cambridge University expressly forbade saltings, but such injunctions were often ignored.

== Salting payments ==
Periodic injunctions notwithstanding, Cambridge college authorities seem to have sanctioned, to some degree at least, the practice of saltings. Many payments of students' salting fees, for example, can be found recorded in their tutors' account books. Each student was charged for his salting according to precedence and means: the generally accepted fee scale appears to have been six pence for sizars, two shillings for pensioners, and three shillings and four pence for fellow commoners. These fees may have contributed to the cost of a special salting night dinner to celebrate the occasion.
