= Brooklyn Conservatory of Music =

Coordinates: 40°40′33″N 73°58′29″W

- Interactive map of the Brooklyn Conservatory of Music area
- Former names: M. Brasher Residence

General information
- Type: Brick with brownstone trim
- Location: 58 Seventh Avenue; Brooklyn, New York City
- Completed: 1881
- Owner: Brooklyn Conservatory of Music

Design and construction
- Architect: S. F. Evelette

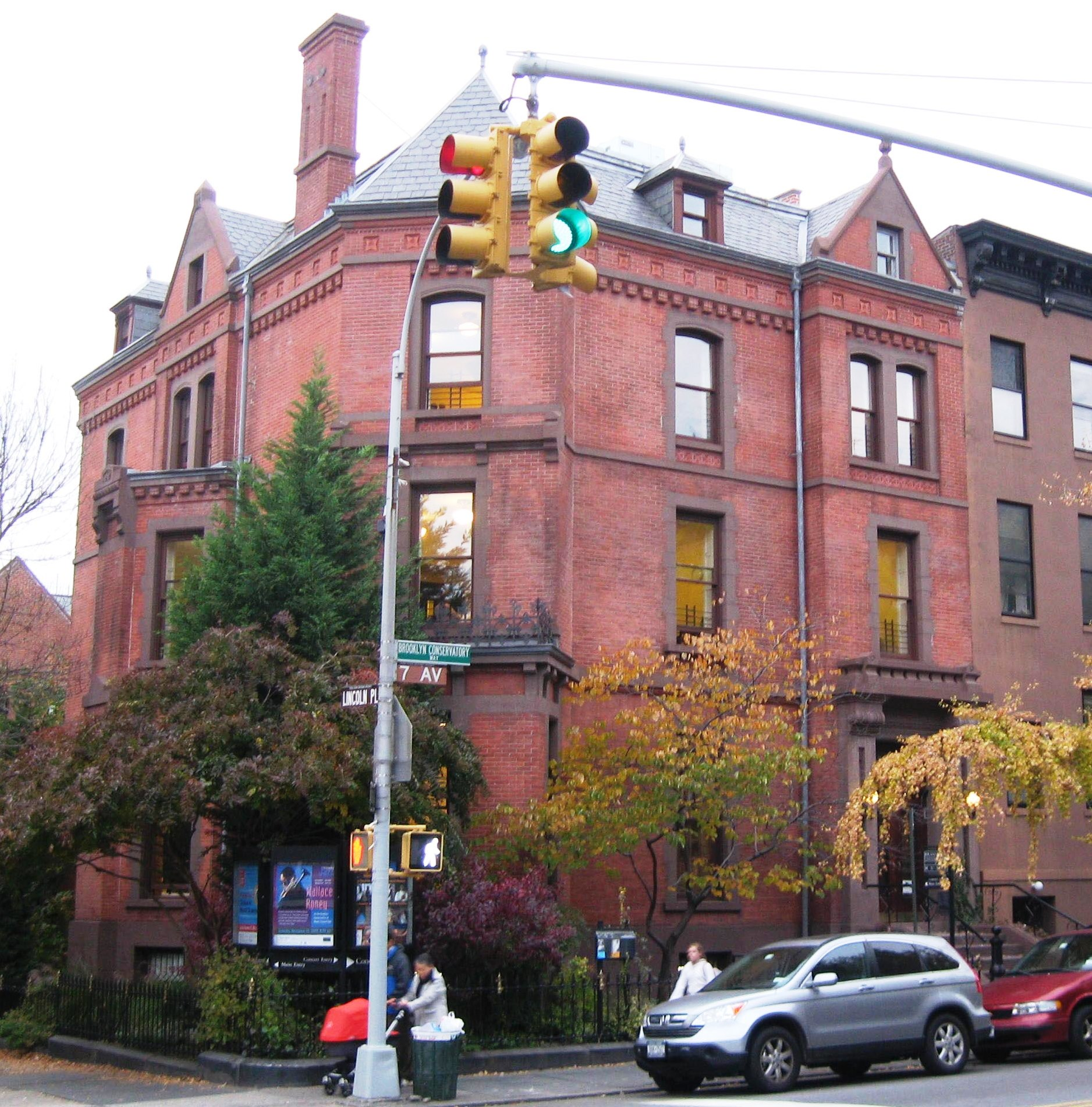
58 Seventh Avenue

The Brooklyn Conservatory of Music, known at one time as the Brooklyn-Queens Conservatory of Music, is a music conservatory located in Brooklyn, New York City. It offers a broad range of instruction in areas of American song, jazz and gospel singing, Latin jazz, and African drumming. The conservatory was founded in 1897 by German-American immigrants as a classical European conservatory.

The conservatory was initially located at Franklin Avenue and Lefferts Place. In 1944 it moved to occupy an 1881 five-story mansion at 58 Seventh Avenue, Park Slope, Brooklyn, which had been built in 1881 as the residence of M. Brasher, and subsequently became the Park Slope Masonic Club. The building was designed by S. F. Evelette in the Victorian Gothic style, with Queen Anne elements. It is located in the Park Slope Historic District.

The Conservatory operates four divisions catering to 7,500 full and part-time students. It hosts over 200 community events each year including singalongs, recitals, dance parties, curated concert series, performances, workshops and festivals.

The Conservatory is a 501(c)(3). Operating funds come from earned revenue and donations made by individual donors, corporations, foundations and government entities.

== Community Music School ==
800 students participate in weekly private lessons or group classes in every major musical instrument at the Conservatory's Park Slope headquarters. The Community Music School encompasses the Conservatory's 22 ensembles and chamber groups, including the Brooklyn Conservatory Community Orchestra (BCCO) and the Brooklyn Conservatory Chorale (BCO), as well its early childhood and summer programs.

== Suzuki Program ==
The Suzuki program at the Conservatory offers programs in violin, viola, cello, guitar, piano, bass and flute. Children ages 3.5 and up are eligible to participate. 240 students, ages 3–18 enroll each year.

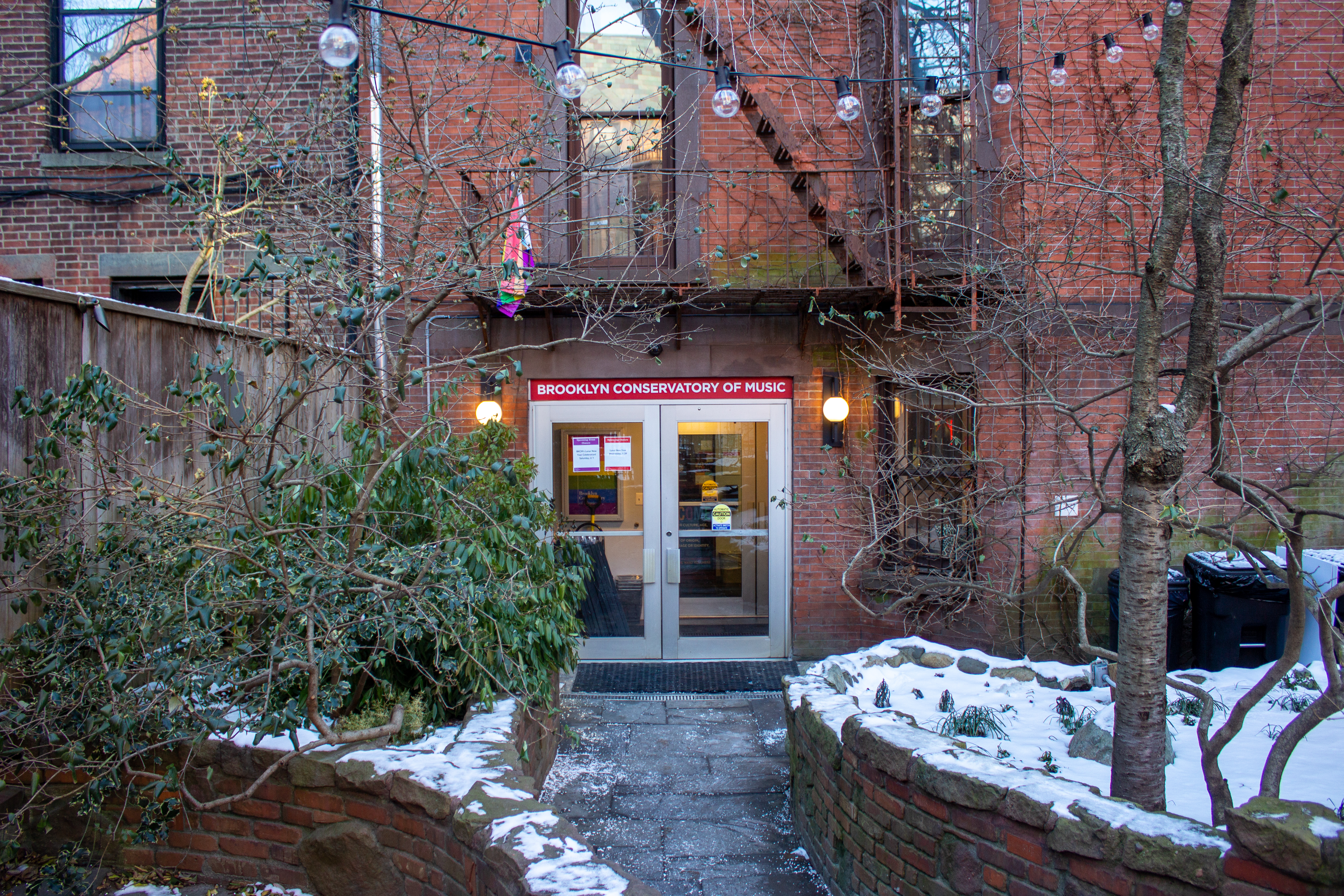

== Music Therapy ==
In 2003, the Music Therapy program was established to address the developmental, emotional, psychological and social needs of children and adults through active music-making in a relationship with a master's and doctoral degree level, certified music therapists. This program serves 1,600 clients citywide at 42 sites.

== Music Partners ==
Music Partners was created in 1988 in response to a critical need in New York City — the rising number of public schools offering no music instruction. It now serves over 5,000 students —two thirds living at or below the poverty line— at 30 sites across the city, making Music Partners the largest off-site music program of any community music school in New York City.
