= Salt (food truck) =

Restaurant chain originating in Dubai

SALT

Restaurant information
- Established: 2014; 12 years ago (2014)
- Location: Dubai, United Arab Emirates
- Website: findsalt.com

SALT (a.k.a. FindSALT) is a restaurant chain that originated as food truck in Dubai, United Arab Emirates.

== History ==
FindSALT was co-founded in 2014 by Amal Al Marri and Deem Albassam. It began as a food truck on Kite Beach and later expanded into a chain.

== See also ==
- List of food trucks
