= Salty dog =

Salty Dog may refer to:

- Salty dog (cocktail), a drink made with vodka or gin and grapefruit juice

== Music ==
- A Salty Dog, a 1969 album by the band Procol Harum
  - "A Salty Dog" (song), a song from the album
- "Salty Dog", a song from a 1964 album "Back in Town" by The Kingston Trio
- "Salty Dog", a 2000 song by Flogging Molly
- Salty Dog (band), an American hard rock band formed in 1986
- "Salty Dog Blues", a traditional folk song
- "Salty Dog Rag", a 1952 hit by Red Foley
- The Original Salty Dogs Jazz Band, a jazz ensemble from the Midwestern United States

== Other uses ==
- Syracuse Salty Dogs, a soccer team from Syracuse, New York
- VX-23, a U.S. Navy squadron known by the nickname Salty Dogs
- Salty Dog, a character on Lily's Driftwood Bay
