= Maldoror (album) =

Studio album by Erik Friedlander
- Released: November 11, 2003
- Recorded: April 25, 2002; Teldex Studios, Berlin
- Genre: Avant-garde, jazz, contemporary classical music
- Length: 40:23
- Label: Brassland HWY-005
- Producer: Michael Montes

Erik Friedlander chronology
| Quake (2003) | Maldoror (2003) | Prowl (2006) |

Maldoror is a solo album by cellist Erik Friedlander recorded in Berlin and released on the Brassland label featuring music inspired by the French poet Comte de Lautréamont's Les Chants de Maldoror.

== Reception ==
Professional ratings
Review scores
| Source | Rating |
|---|---|
| Allmusic | 4.5/5 stars |
| Pitchfork | 8.3/10 stars |

The Allmusic review by Thom Jurek awarded the album 4½ stars stating "For all its intensity, it is nearly shockingly accessible, even with its far-flung and dramatic sense of dynamics. This is an album created to be listened to as one work, the individual selections all contribute to a haunting, hunted whole, and don't really exist well outside their framework as such. Nonetheless, this is a brilliantly conceived and executed recording, alluringly musical, and decadently humorous in places. As Friedlander's latest chapter, it is also his finest".

Pitchfork rated the album 8.3 out of 10 observing that "The formula is simple: put a piece of Ducasse's text in front of the cellist in the studio, along with a few notes, and let him compose music to match it on the spot. It panned out, more or less, not because Maldoror was conceived as a series of songs, but because Erik Friedlander can do things with a cello that should have a reasonable listener fearing for her life".

Jazz Review's John Kelman wrote "Maldoror is, quite simply, an important recording of solo improvised pieces, regardless of the instrument; but all the more compelling because it shows a side to the cello that has not been seen before".

== Track listing ==
All compositions by Erik Friedlander

1. "May It Please Heaven" - 3:31
2. "One Should Let One's Fingernails Grow" - 3:08
3. "The Wind Groans" - 5:30
4. "O Stern Mathematics" - 4:54
5. "The Palace of Pleasures" - 4:33
6. "Here Comes the Madwoman" - 2:54
7. "I Am Filthy" - 4:53
8. "Flights of Starlings" - 3:47
9. "He Contemplates the Moon" - 3:31
10. "A Sewing-Machine and an Umbrella" - 3:45

== Personnel ==
- Erik Friedlander – cello
