= Salt (French-American band) =

Multinational band

SALT
- Origin: France
- Genres: Power pop, indie rock, psychedelic music
- Years active: 2016–present
- Labels: Beehive; Propeller Sound Recordings
- Members: Stéphane Schück; Fred Quentin; Benoit Lautridou
- Past members: Ken Stringfellow; Anton Barbeau
- Website: The Salt Collective

SALT, also known as The Salt Collective, is a French-American band that was formed in 2016 by songwriter Stéphane Schück (guitar), producer Ken Stringfellow (guitar), and Anton Barbeau (keyboards, lead vocals). Joined by bassist Fred Quentin and drummer Benoit Lautridou, they released their first album in 2019.

After reducing their lineup in 2022 to the Paris-based core of Schück, Lautridou, and Quentin, SALT collaborated with producer Chris Stamey and numerous guest musicians, releasing the 2023 album Life under the name The Salt Collective.

== History ==
=== Founding and early years ===
Schück, Quentin, and Lautridou became friends during their high school years in Caen, Normandy, bonding around a shared enthusiasm for what Lautridou described as post-punk pop of the 80s and 90s. Lautridou recalled that they exchanged cassettes and vinyl of favorite artists such as The Clash. Lautridou was also very enthusiastic about Game Theory, and Schück about the dB's, while Quintin favored The Specials, XTC, and Madness.

As university students, the trio formed a band and continued to play together periodically while pursuing professional careers in medicine (Schück and Quentin) and education (Lautridou). By the 2000s, Schück had become a successful Paris-based physician specializing in public health and epidemiology. He recruited one of his musical idols, Scott Miller of Game Theory, to produce a demo recording for his band with Quentin and Lautridou, which was then called Swan Plastic Swan. Schück continued a friendship with Miller, and the two had co-written four songs together by the time of Miller's death in 2013.

SALT was formed in 2016 by multi-instrumentalist Anton Barbeau, producer Ken Stringfellow, and Schück. Miller had been a friend and musical collaborator with each of the three, who had never met one another before Miller's death. Schück first came together with Barbeau and Stringfellow at Abbey Road Studios in London, during July 2015 recording sessions for Supercalifragile, the posthumous final album by Miller's band Game Theory, which Stringfellow was producing.

With Schück as SALT's songwriter, playing guitar alongside Stringfellow, Barbeau took on lead vocals and keyboard duties. Quentin and Lautridou later joined SALT as bassist and drummer. Barbeau and Stringfellow, both American expatriates, live in Berlin and Paris, respectively, and the group rehearsed in both cities. Their debut album, titled The Loneliness of Clouds, was recorded in Paris and in London at Abbey Road Studios. It was released in June 2019 on Beehive Records, Barbeau's label. The lyrics of its ten songs, all written by Schück, were "translated" by lead vocalist Barbeau from "heavily French'd English into a more standardized tongue."

=== The Salt Collective ===
In 2022, after paring down its lineup to the core trio of Schück, Lautridou, and Quentin, SALT teamed with producer Chris Stamey of The dB's to enlist additional musical collaborators for their work in progress. The resulting "international 'supergroup' collaboration" was dubbed The Salt Collective, and under that billing, Propeller Sound Recordings released the album Life in 2023.

In addition to SALT, contributors to the twelve songs on the album included Juliana Hatfield, Matthew Sweet, Susan Cowsill, Mitch Easter, Matthew Caws of Nada Surf, and Richard Lloyd of Television, along with Stamey and fellow dB's members Peter Holsapple, Will Rigby, and Gene Holder.

== Critical response ==
In a Power Popaholic review, SALT was called "a power pop supergroup that skipped under the radar". Even prior to the release of SALT's first album, critic Bill Kopp of Musoscribe contemplated the term "supergroup" based on Stringfellow and Barbeau's distinctive musical histories. Kopp suggested:

Imagine the best qualities of Barbeau's wonderfully idiosyncratic approach wedded to the oomph of Posies at their rockingest. Now add a previously unknown quantity: Schück's high quality songwriting. The result is a must-have for fans of the better-known musicians. Somehow quirky and straightforward at once.

The Big Takeover's Michael Toland recommended the group to "aficionados of guitar-based melody and singalong choruses", adding that "songwriters Schück and Barbeau are plainly incapable of penning anything that doesn't have hooks". Toland described SALT's debut album as "a bucket of the kind of catchy, slightly psychedelic power pop you'd expect from these folks... Stringfellow uses his producer's seat to guide the tracks toward maximum melodic glory."

Babysue wrote, "With a lineup like this... you can bet there's no way things couldn't sound rather fantastic." Pointing to XTC, Game Theory, and The Beatles as the group's main influences, the reviewer added:

[P]erhaps most surprising is that many of these songs remind us very much of Split Enz (a band whose music we have always admired). Schuck's songs have smooth hummable melodies and cool subtle hooks. Barbeau's vocals sound fantastic (as always)... The Loneliness of Clouds possesses everything that's good about modern underground pop.

In Stomp and Stammer magazine, Glen Sarvady called The Loneliness of Clouds "a solid set of lite psychedelia well suited for fans of the Paisley Underground or Dukes of Stratosphear. The harmony-rich mid-tempo procession gives equal play to guitars and keys, and when the tunes occasionally veer toward the homogeneous, Barbeau's quirks swoop in to clinch the deal."

Glide Magazine, in its review of the 2023 album Life, described The Salt Collective as a "revolving door supergroup", focusing on the Paris-based core of Schück, Lautridou, and Quentin. SALT's 2019 debut was recharacterized as "one of their first collaborations."

According to Musoscribe, the "major talents" who appear as guest artists on Life "never overwhelm the project. These are top-flight musicians who are long past having to prove themselves; there's an assured sense of creative freedom at work throughout."
