= Forget Cassettes =

American alternative rock band

- Also known as: Eliza the Arrow; Elizabeth Grace
- Origin: Nashville, Tennessee
- Genres: Alternative rock, indie rock, synth pop, dream pop
- Years active: 2001–2016
- Labels: Theory 8 Records, One Little Indian Records
- Members: Beth Cameron; Doni Schroader; Aaron Ford; Jay Leo Phillips

Forget Cassettes was an alternative rock band from Nashville, Tennessee, active between 2001 and 2016 on the Theory 8 Records label. Frontwoman Beth Cameron was the band's only permanent member throughout the band's years of activity.

== History ==
=== Formation and Instruments of Action (2003) ===
Forget Cassettes was formed in Nashville by vocalist Beth Cameron, formerly of the musical trio Fair Verona. In 2001, Fair Verona broke up after a record deal failed to come to fruition. This band received revived interest in 2024 after its 1999 song, The Downfall of a Well Known Actress, was investigated by the Lostwave community on Reddit.

Following the band's dissolution, Cameron was joined by Fair Verona's drummer, Doni Schroader. They recorded Forget Cassettes' first album, Instruments of Action (2003), through Theory 8 Records. The album, produced by Mike McCarthy, debuted at 47 on the Core Chart, a collation of playlists from the largest 100 college radio stations in the United States.

In a review for Dusted Magazine, Joel Calahan compared Forget Cassettes' debut to Mission of Burma and Gang of Four, "infusing the post-rock genre with a modern, explosive sensibility." Airplay received by the album on Ohio-based radio station WOXY.com brought Forget Cassettes to the top of the station's People’s Choice Countdown for several weeks.

=== Salt (2006) and other activities ===
When Schroader left to tour with ...And You Will Know Us by the Trail of Dead shortly after the recording of Instruments of Action, Cameron partnered with multi-instrumentalist Jay Leo Philips and drummer Aaron Ford. At this time, Philips and Ford were Cameron's fellow labelmates.

This line-up was responsible for the band's second album, Salt (2006), also released via Theory 8 Records. Recorded with producer Jeremy Ferguson, Salt's musical style and Cameron's vocals invited comparisons to PJ Harvey and Karen O by Spin magazine, while Hayley Avron of Plan B compared track "Quiero, Quieres" to the Dresden Dolls. Cameron would cite PJ Harvey as a personal inspiration in an interview with Missbehave in 2007.

Salt was slated to receive a European release through One Little Independent Records in 2007, but the deal fell through. Cameron, who had relocated to Chicago in anticipation of further career opportunities, felt disillusioned with the music industry after this experience. She returned to Nashville and enrolled in college.

Also in 2007, Schroader returned to the band. The group was briefly active as a four piece until Jay Leo Philips and Aaron Ford departed the same year. Philips left to become the frontman of band Apollo Up!. Cameron and Schroader briefly performed under the name Elizabeth Grace, then Eliza the Arrow in 2009.

=== O Cursa (2013) and breakup ===
Cameron and Schroader collaborated for the band's third and final album, O Cursa (2013). Preceding the album's release, the band released a music video for the track, "Sometimes You're The Bad Guy."

A collection of three Forget Cassettes EPs into a two-part LP, the first half of the album was released in November, followed by the second half in December. O Cursa fell "just shy" of making it to the Nashville Scene Critics' Poll of Top Local Albums (2013). The album represented a move from the band's rock sound to "richly textured electro-rock," as described by D. Patrick Rodgers.

Cameron performed alone as Forget Cassettes for several years following the album's release. She also performed with the band Ponychase until around 2016.

== Later activity ==
=== Black Bra ===
In 2016, Cameron married Miles Price, a fellow musician who she had met at her solo Forget Cassettes shows. They enlisted other musicians to form a band, Black Bra, which signed to Y2K Records in 2019. The band remains on the label as of 2026.

=== Reunion ===
Cameron, Philips, and Ford reunited in November 2022 to discuss the writing and recording of Salt (2006) with Nashville music outlet, We Own This Town.

== Band members ==
- Beth Cameron (guitar, vocals, keys)
- Aaron Ford (drums)
- Jay Leo Phillips (bass, guitar, keys, backing vocals)
- Doni Schroader (drums, percussion, backing vocals, keys)
- Jason Milan Dietz (bass and keys 2007)

== Discography ==
- Instruments of Action (2003)
- Salt (2006)
- O Cursa (2013)
