= Salter =

Salter may refer to:

- Salter (fish), a sea-run population of brook trout (Salvelinus fontinalis)
- Salter (occupation), someone who trades in salt
- Salter (surname)
- Salter (trap)
- Salter Brecknell, a manufacturer of light commercial weighing scales, part of Avery Weigh-Tronix
- Salter Housewares, a manufacturer of consumer weighing scales
- Salters Steamers, a boating company on the River Thames, England
- Worshipful Company of Salters, a Livery Company of the City of London

== See also ==
- Salt (disambiguation)
- Psalter, a Book of Psalms
- Drysalter, a dealer in chemical products
