= Christopher Hoffman (musician) =

American musician (born 1978)

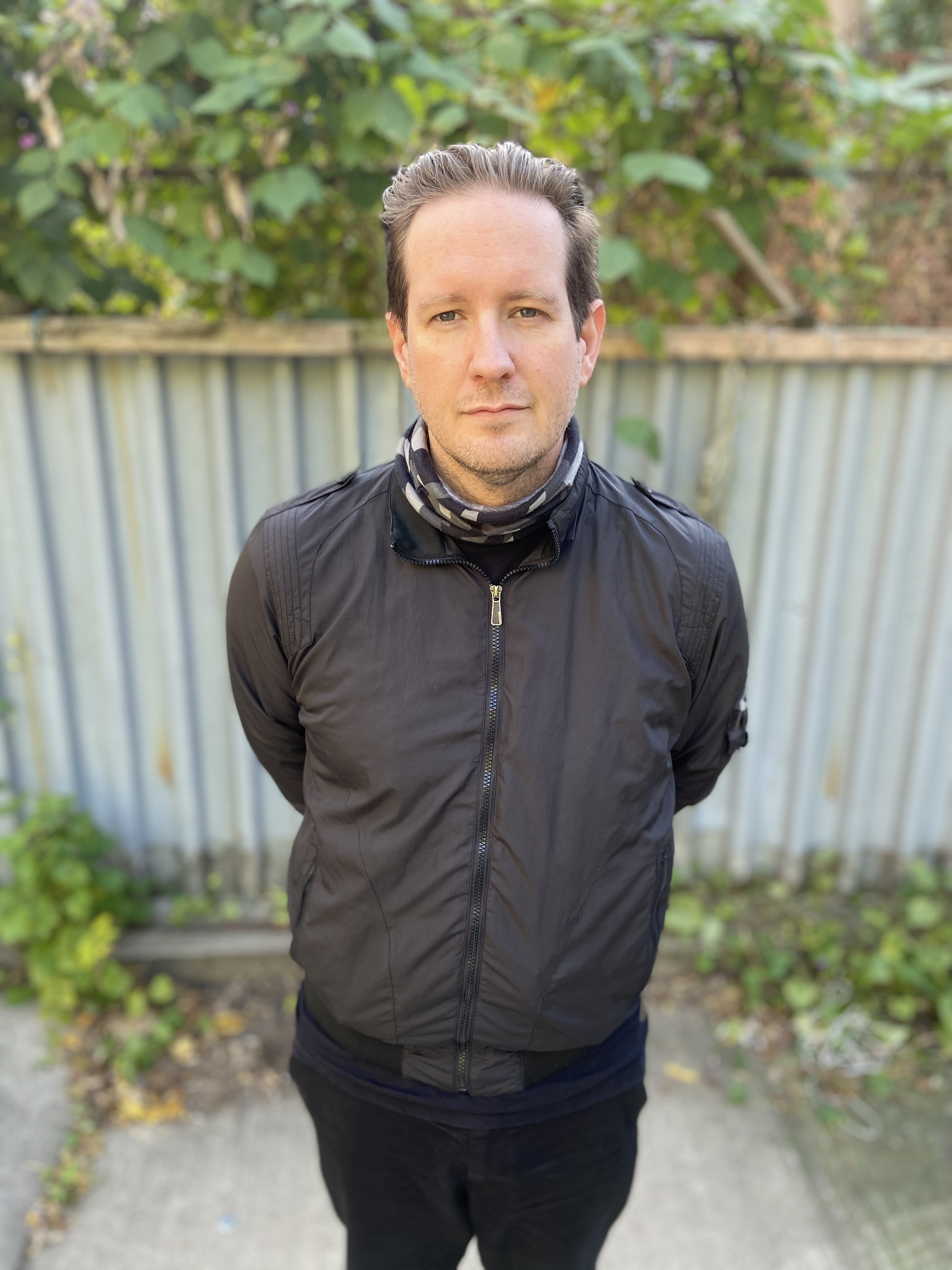

Background information
- Born: 26 June 1978 (age 47); Park Ridge, Illinois, U.S.
- Genres: Jazz, rock, folk, experimental music
- Occupations: Musician, composer, filmmaker
- Instrument: Cello
- Website: www.christopherhoffman.com

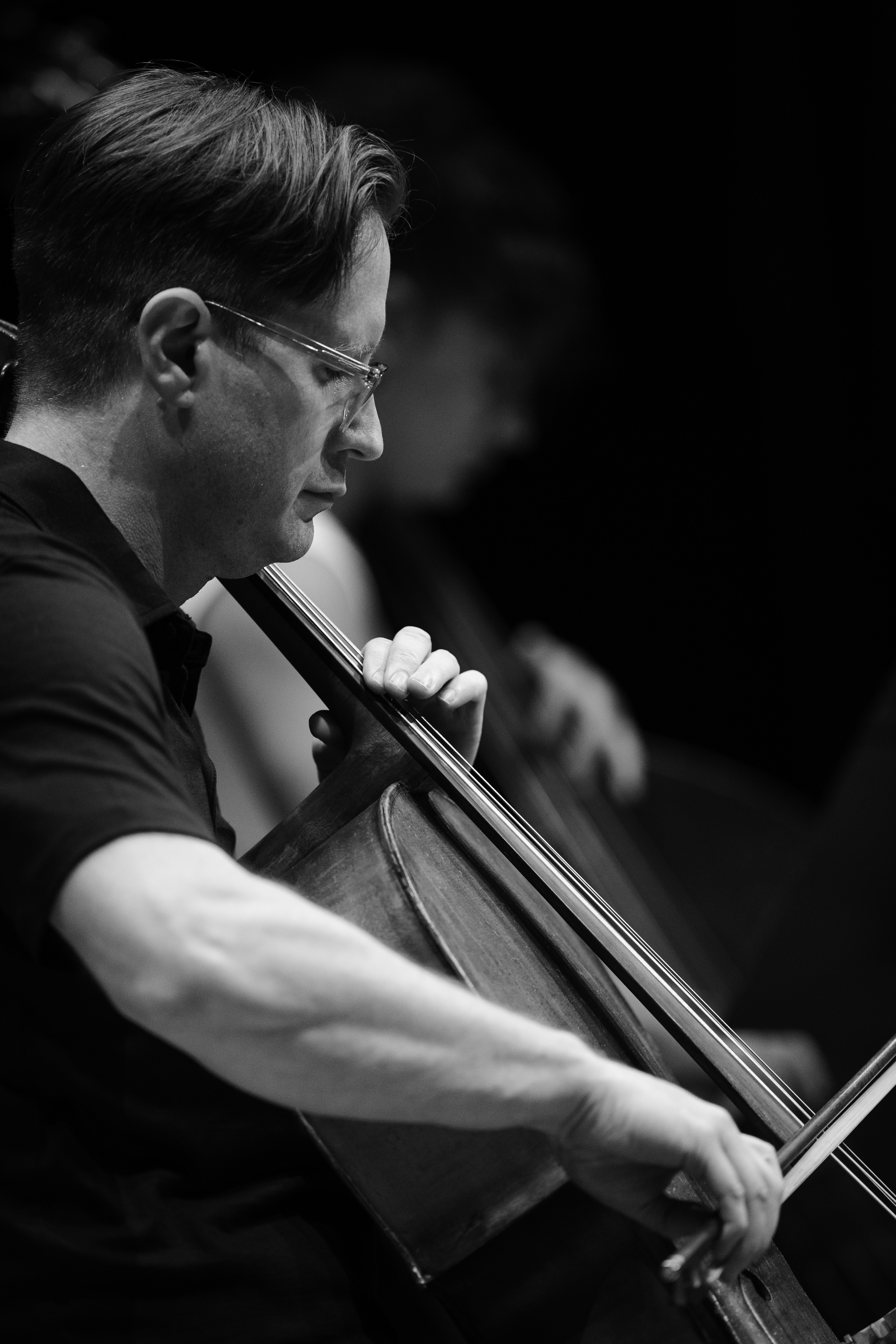
Christopher Hoffman, Arts for Art - Vision Festival 2024. Photo by Marek Lazarski

Christopher Hoffman (born June 26, 1978) is an American cellist, composer, sound technician and filmmaker. He leads the Christopher Hoffman Quartet, MULTIFARIAM and experimental rock band Company Of Selves. Hoffman plays with saxophonists James Brandon Lewis and Michael Blake and is a longtime member of Henry Threadgill's Zooid. In his review of Hoffman's 2021 album Asp Nimbus, New York Times jazz critic Giovanni Russenello wrote, "The cellist Christopher Hoffman's unruly, unorthodox quartet moves around with its limbs loose, but its body held together".

== Career ==
In 2006 he joined actor and musician Michael Pitt's rock band Pagoda.

Hoffman formed Slow To Wake in 2007 with EJ Fry & Geoff Kreally.

In 2008 he released The Other with his brothers Ian and Dylan Hoffman under the name Needers & Givers.

In 2010 he collaborated with Michael Pitt for Martin Scorsese's Shutter Island with Hoffman arranging and performing a multi-tracked cello version of Gustav Mahler's A Minor Piano Quartet for the end credits.That year he joined Henry Threadgill's Zooid and has appeared on six of Threadgill's records. Most notably the 2016 Pulitzer Prize winning In For A Penny, In For A Pound.

In 2014 Hoffman played on the Juno Award nominated Mirror Of The Mind by Earl MacDonald.

Hoffman released Silver Cord Quintet in 2016 featuring Tony Malaby & Kris Davis.

In 2018 he released MULTIFARIAM featuring Tony Malaby, Christina Courtin & Gerald Cleaver. Hoffman also played on Andy Milne's album The Seasons of Being which won the Juno Award for 2019 Jazz Album of the Year.

In 2019 he appeared on Anat Cohen's Grammy Nominated Triple Helix and Anna Webber's Clockwise which was included in the 2019 NPR Music Jazz Critics Poll.

In 2021 Hoffman released Asp Nimbus featuring David Virelles, Bryan Carrott, Rashaan Carter & Craig Weinrib. It made Bandcamp's Best Jazz of 2021(13) and was featured on The New York Times: The Playlist. He is a member of James Brandon Lewis's Red Lily Quintet whose 2021 release Jesup Wagon was named Best Jazz Album Of 2021 by The New York Times, NPR, Slate, JazzTimes, PopMatters, Stereo Gum, The Wire, Magnet & The New York City Jazz Record.

Hoffman has performed with Yoko Ono, Bleachers, Marianne Faithfull, Iron & Wine, Ryan Adams, Lee Konitz and Marc Ribot. Hoffman formed Slow To Wake in 2007 with EJ Fry and Geoff Kreally.

== Discography (partial) ==
- 2008 - The Other (w Needers & Givers, Ian and Dylan Hoffman)
- 2011 - Induction - Hundred Pockets Recs (& Sad Companion) HPR
- 2016 - Butterfly Handlers & Memory Travelers - COS - Fleeting Youth Recs
- 2016 - Silver Cord Quintet - Asclepius Recs (w Tony Malaby & Kris Davis)
- 2018 - MULTIFARIAM - Asclepius Recs
- 2021 - Asp Nimbus - Out Of Your Head Recs (w David Virelles, Bryan Carrott, Rashaan Carter & Craig Weinrib)
- 2024 - Vision Is The Identity - Out Of Your Head Recs ()
