= Topaz (Erik Friedlander album) =

Studio album by Erik Friedlander
- Released: March 2, 1999
- Recorded: December 29 & 30, 1997; Clinton Recording Studios, New York, NY
- Genre: Avant-garde, jazz, contemporary classical music
- Length: 56:05
- Label: Siam SMD-50003
- Producer: Erik Friedlander

Erik Friedlander chronology
The Watchman (1996)	Topaz (1999)	Skin (2000)

Topaz is a 1999 album by cellist Erik Friedlander which was released on the Siam label and features the quartet that became known as Topaz.

== Reception ==
Professional ratings
Review scores
Source	Rating
Allmusic	4/5 stars
The Penguin Guide to Jazz Recordings	3/4 stars

The Allmusic review by Alex Henderson awarded the album 4 stars stating "Topaz, like a lot of avant-garde jazz, isn't easy to absorb on the first listen. But the more times you listen, the more you realize how much this left-of-center CD has going for it".

== Track listing ==
All compositions by Erik Friedlander except as indicated

1. "Verdine" - 5:37
2. "November" - 4:20
3. "Shining" - 6:10
4. "Straw Dogs" - 7:29
5. "Topaz" - 2:49
6. "Three Desperate Men" - 3:31
7. "Tout de Suite" (Miles Davis) - 8:29
8. "Hat and Beard" (Eric Dolphy) - 4:45
9. "Something Sweet, Something Tender / Cienega" (Dolphy / Friedlander) - 6:59
10. "Agon" - 5:56

== Personnel ==
- Erik Friedlander – cello
- Andy Laster – alto saxophone
- Stomu Takeishi – bass
- Satoshi Takeishi – percussion
