= Brandon Ross =

American jazz guitarist

Brandon K. Ross is an American jazz rock guitarist. He was born in New Brunswick, New Jersey.

== Career ==
Ross did clerical work for Leroy Jenkins before playing with Archie Shepp and Marion Brown in the second half of the 1970s.

He has performed with Wadada Leo Smith, Gene Lake, Marcus Rojas, John Lurie, Henry Threadgill, Don Byron, and Cassandra Wilson.

In 1998, Ross, bassist Melvin Gibbs, and drummer J.T. Lewis formed the trio Harriet Tubman, which continues to perform concerts and record, as of 2023.

== Discography ==
=== As leader ===
- Costume (Intoxicate, 2004)
- Puppet (Intoxicate, 2006)
- For Living Lovers (Sunnyside, 2014)
- Phantom Station - Off the End (Sunnyside, 2024)

=== As co-leader ===
- Harriet Tubman: I am a Man (with Melvin Gibbs, J. T. Lewis) (Knitting Factory Records, 1998)
- Harriet Tubman: Ascension (with Melvin Gibbs, J. T. Lewis e. a.) (Sunnyside, 2011)
- Harriet Tubman: Araminta (with Melvin Gibbs, J. T. Lewis e. a.) (Sunnyside, 2017)
- Harriet Tubman: The Terror End of Beauty (with Melvin Gibbs, J. T. Lewis) (Sunnyside, 2018)

=== As sideman ===
With Kip Hanrahan

- A Thousand Nights and a Night (1-Red Night) (American Clave, 1996)
- A Thousand Nights and a Night (Shadow Night 1) (Justin Time, 1998)
- Beautiful Scars (American Clave, 2007)
- Crescent Moon Waning (Yellowbird, 2018)

With Oliver Lake

- Plug It (Gramavision, 1983)
- Dancevision (Blue Heron, 1986)
- Impala (Gramavision, 1987)

With Meshell Ndegeocello

- The Spirt Music Jamia (Universal, 2005)
- The Article 3 (Bismallah, 2006)
- The World Has Made Me the Man of My Dreams (Bismallah, 2007)

With Wadada Leo Smith

- Spiritual Dimensions (Cuneiform, 2009)
- Heart's Reflections (Cuneiform, 2011)
- Najwa (TUM, 2017)

With Henry Threadgill

- Spirit of Nuff...Nuff (Black Saint, 1991)
- Too Much Sugar for a Dime (Axiom, 1993)
- Song Out of My Trees (Black Saint, 1994)
- Carry the Day (Columbia, 1995)
- Making a Move (Columbia, 1995)
- Where's Your Cup? (Columbia, 1997)
- Everybody's Mouth's a Book (Pi, 2001)

With Cassandra Wilson

- Blue Light Till Dawn (Blue Note, 1993)
- New Moon Daughter (Blue Note, 1995)
- Glamoured (Blue Note, 2003)
- Closer to You (Blue Note, 2009)
- Silver Pony (Blue Note, 2010)

With others

- Pheeroan akLaff, Fits Like a Glove (Gramavision, 1983)
- Arrested Development, Unplugged (Chrysalis, 1993)
- Marion Brown, La Placita (Timeless Muse, 1979)
- Marion Brown, Five Improvisations (B.Free, 2014)
- Don Byron, Plays the Music of Mickey Katz (Elektra Nonesuch, 1993)
- Don Byron, Love, Peace, and Soul (Savoy, 2012)
- Alana Davis, Blame It on Me (Elektra, 1997)
- DJ Logic, Project Logic (Ropeadope, 1999)
- Fred Hopkins, Prophecy (About Time, 1990)
- Graham Haynes, Transition (Antilles, 1995)
- Graham Haynes, BPM (Knitting Factory, 2000)
- Leroy Jenkins, Leroy Jenkins Live! (Black Saint, 1993)
- Leroy Jenkins, Urban Blues (Black Saint, 1984)
- Bill Laswell, Jazzonia (Douglas Music, 1998)
- Bill Laswell, Moody's Mood for Love (Douglas, 1998)
- Myra Melford, The Image of Your Body (Cryptogramophone, 2006)
- Myra Melford, The Whole Tree Gone (Firehouse 12, 2010)
- Ron Miles, Laughing Barrel (Sterling Circle, 2003)
- Butch Morris, Current Trends in Racism in Modern America (Sound Aspects, 1985)
- Ivo Perelman, Children of Ibeji (Enja, 1992)
- Julian Schnabel, Every Silver Lining Has a Cloud (Island, 1995)
- Archie Shepp, There's a Trumpet in My Soul (Arista/Freedom, 1975)
- Archie Shepp, Attica Blues Big Band Live at the Palais Des Glaces (Blue Marge, 1979)
