= Melvin Gibbs =

American bassist

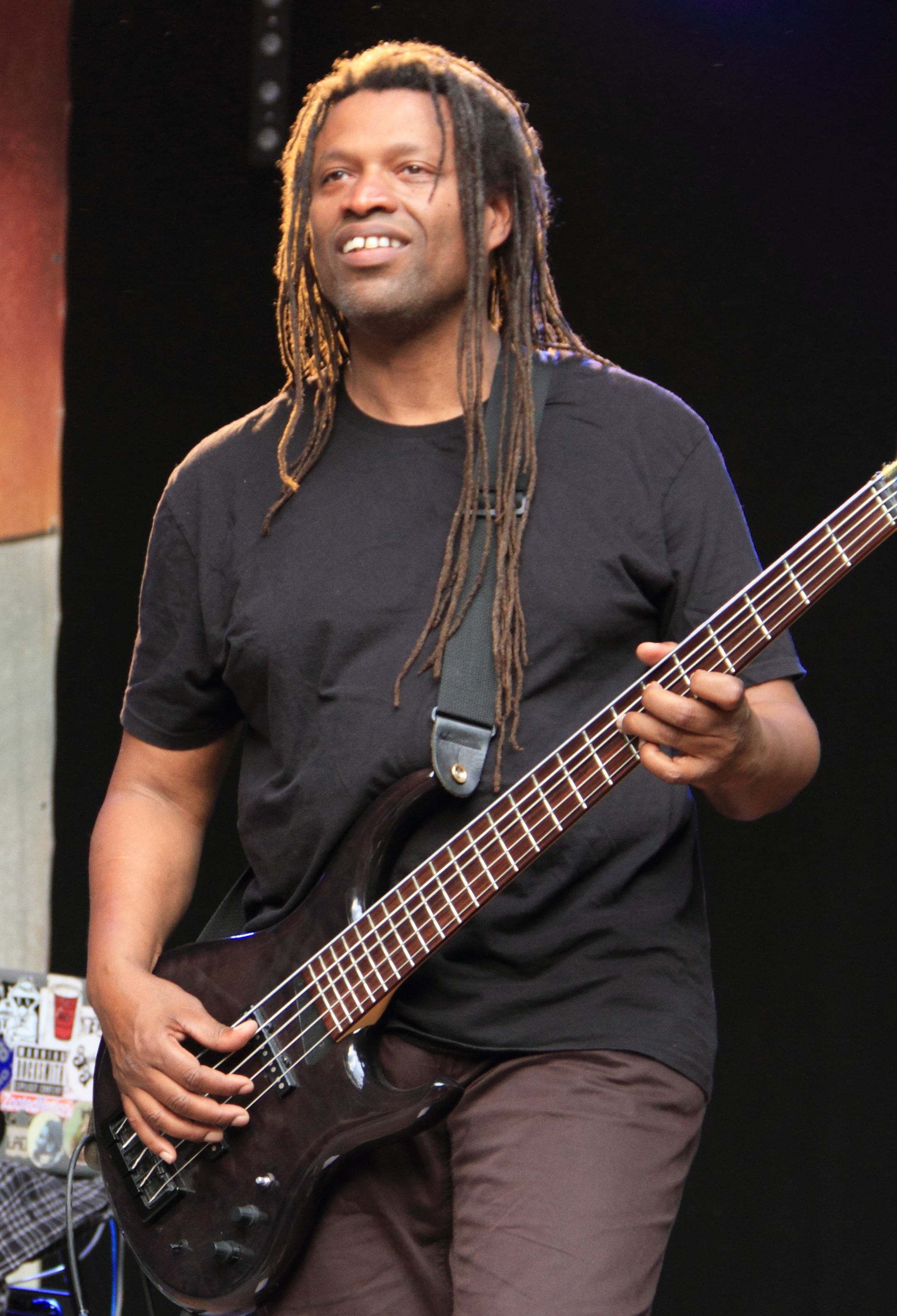
- Gibbs performing in 2014

Background information
- Origin: Brooklyn, New York, U.S.
- Education: Medgar Evers College; Brooklyn Conservatory of Music
- Genres: Jazz fusion, alternative metal, funk rock, ambient, hip hop
- Occupations: Musician, composer, producer
- Instrument: Bass guitar
- Years active: 1980–present
- Labels: Livewired Music, Rage
- Member of: Harriet Tubman
- Formerly of: Rollins Band, Defunkt, Eye and I, Black Rock Coalition
- Website: melvin-gibbs.bandcamp.com

Melvin Gibbs is an American bass guitarist who has appeared on close to 200 albums in diverse genres of music. Among others, Gibbs is known for working in jazz with drummer Ronald Shannon Jackson and guitarist Sonny Sharrock, and in rock music with Rollins Band and Arto Lindsay. He is a member of the band Harriet Tubman, with whom he was included in the New York Times list of best performances of 2017, and Body Meπa, recognized in Bandcamp Daily's best experimental music of 2024.

== Career ==
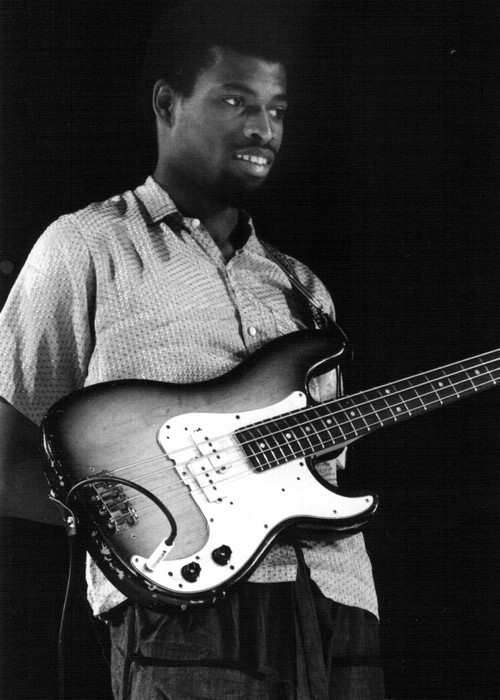
Gibbs in a July 1980 performance in Paris, France

Melvin Gibbs was born on May 25, 1958. A native of Brooklyn, New York, Gibbs attended Medgar Evers College and the Brooklyn Conservatory of Music. He first came to public notice as a member of the group Defunkt, which was a mainstay of the early 1980s downtown New York scene. Throughout the 1980s, he played in drummer Ronald Shannon Jackson's Decoding Society, with guitarist Vernon Reid, and with guitarist Sonny Sharrock and saxophonist John Zorn. With Jackson and guitarist Bill Frisell, Gibbs was a member of the group Power Tools. Gibbs co-led the band Eye and I with D.K. Dyson who also co-founded the Black Rock Coalition of which he is an original member.

Gibbs took on the role of record producer while with the Rollins Band in the 1990s. He worked in that capacity, producing records for other artists on Rage Records.

He was a member of the avant-metal Rollins Band from 1993 to about 1998 and again in 2006 when the group briefly reformed. As a member of the Rollins Band, he performed at Woodstock '94 in 1994 and was nominated for a Grammy Award in 1995. Gibbs has also recorded with hip-hop duo Dead Prez, Brazilian musicians Caetano Veloso and Marisa Monte, Latin jazz musician Eddie Palmieri, Nigerian musician Femi Kuti, and guitarist Marc Ribot. Gibbs has produced albums by turntablist DJ Logic and guitarist Arto Lindsay. Gibbs and Lindsay met in 1979 and first collaborated musically in 1984, and Lindsay has referred to Gibbs as his "closest collaborator".

Gibbs formed the Punk-Funk All-Stars with James Blood Ulmer, Defunkt leader Joseph Bowie, Vernon Reid and Ronald Shannon Jackson. In 1998, Gibbs, guitarist Brandon Ross, and drummer J.T. Lewis formed the trio Harriet Tubman.

Ancients Speak, the first album by Melvin Gibbs' Elevated Entity, was released on March 17, 2009, by Livewired Music. In 2009, he joined the group SociaLybrium with Bernie Worrell of Parliament-Funkadelic, DeWayne "Blackbyrd" McKnight, and J.T. Lewis. The group's album For You/For Us/For All was released by Livewired in December 2009.

Gibbs' other projects include Melvin Runs the Hoodoo Down with guitarist Pete Cosey and keyboard player John Medeski; the Geechee Seminoles with percussionist David Pleasant; Zig Zag Power Trio with guitarist Vernon Reid and drummer Will Calhoun; God Particle with cosmologist/saxophonist Stephon Alexander, David Pleasant, and other musicians; and Melvin Gibbs Magnum.

In June 2026 Gibbs released a 304 pages non-fiction book, How Black Music Took Over the World with the publisher Bloomsbury Sigma (ISBN 9781399433280).

== Discography ==
=== As leader ===
Year	Artist	Title	Label
2009	Melvin Gibbs' Elevated Entity	Ancients Speak	LiveWired
2011	Melvin Gibbs	Phree-dem downloads	
2021	Melvin Gibbs	4 + 1 equals 5 for May 25	
2022	Melvin Gibbs	Anamibia Sessions Vol. 1: The Wave	Editions Mego
2025	Melvin Gibbs	Amasia: Anamibia Sessions 2	Hausu Mountain

=== As co-leader ===
Year	Artist	Title	Label	Personnel
1987	Power Tools	Strange Meeting	Antilles New Directions	Gibbs, Ronald Shannon Jackson, Bill Frisell
1998	Harriet Tubman	I Am a Man	SlaveNo Mo'/Knitting Factory	Gibbs, Brandon Ross, J.T. Lewis
2000	Harriet Tubman	Prototype	Avant	Gibbs, Ross, Lewis
2004	Sharp / Gibbs / Carter	Raw Meet	Intakt	Gibbs, Elliott Sharp, Lance Carter
2010	Socialybrium	For You – For Us – For All	LiveWired	Gibbs, Bernie Worrell, DeWayne McKnight, Lewis
2011	Harriet Tubman	Ascension	Sunnyside	Gibbs, Ross, Lewis
2013	Sharp / Gibbs / Niggli	Crossing the Waters	Intakt	Gibbs, Sharp, Lucas Niggli
2017	Harriet Tubman	Araminta	Sunnyside	Gibbs, Ross, Lewis
2018	Zig Zag Power Trio	Woodstock Sessions	Woodstock Sessions	Gibbs, Vernon Reid, Will Calhoun
2018	Harriet Tubman	The Terror End of Beauty	Sunnyside	Gibbs, Ross, Lewis
2021	Body Meπa	The Work Is Slow	Hausu Mountain	Gibbs, Greg Fox, Sasha Frere-Jones, Grey Mcmurray
2024	Body Meπa	Prayer in Dub	Hausu Mountain	Gibbs, Fox, Frere-Jones, Mcmurray

=== Singles ===
- 2011: "E-volution" single (rereleased later, Melvin Gibbs via bandcamp)
- 2011: Lucent Steps: Ascension Remix single (Melvin Gibbs via bandcamp)
- 2013: "Still Dreamin'" single (rereleased later, Melvin Gibbs via bandcamp)
- 2020: "Holy Ground: 38th and Chicago – initial thoughts" single (Melvin Gibbs via bandcamp)
- 2021: "It's Been a Long Time Coming" single (Melvin Gibbs via bandcamp)
- 2021: FlyBoy's Bardo EZ Pass single (Melvin Gibbs via bandcamp)

=== As sideman ===
With Defunkt

- 1980: Defunkt
- 1994: Live & Reunified
- 2005: Defunkt/Thermonuclear Sweat

With Rollins Band

- 1994: Weight
- 1997: Come In and Burn

With Jean-Paul Bourelly

- 1994: Saints & Sinners
- 1997: Fade to Cacophony: Live
- 2002: Trance Atlantic

With DJ Logic

- 1999: Project Logic
- 2001: The Anomaly
- 2006: Zen of Logic

With Ronald Shannon Jackson

- 1980: Eye on You
- 1981: Nasty
- 1982: Mandance (Antilles)
- 1983: Street Priest
- 1983: Barbeque Dog (Antilles)
- 1985: Decode Yourself (Island)
- 1990: Taboo
- 1999: Live in Montreux
- 2000: Earned Dreams
- 2000: Live at Greenwich House

With Arto Lindsay

- 1995: Aggregates 1-26
- 1996: Mundo Civilizado
- 1996: Subtle Body
- 1998: Noon Chill
- 1999: Prize
- 2000: Ecomixes
- 2002: Invoke
- 2004: Salt
- 2014: Encyclopedia of Arto
- 2017: Cuidado Madame

With Marisa Monte

- 1991: Mais
- 1996: Barulhinho Bom (A Great Noise)

With Sonny Sharrock

- 1987: Seize the Rainbow (Enemy)
- 1989: Live in New York (Enemy)
- 1996: Into Another Light

With Moreno Veloso

- 2001: Music Typewriter
- 2014: Coisa Boa

With Vitamin C

- 1999: Vitamin C
- 2000: More

With John Zorn

- 1986: The Big Gundown (Elektra)
- 1988: Spillane

With others

- 1982: Sueño, Eddie Palmieri
- 1989: Come Together as One, Will Downing
- 1989: Unh!, Philip Tabane
- 1990: Metamorphosis, World Saxophone Quartet
- 1990: Rootless Cosmopolitans, Marc Ribot
- 1991: Circulado, Caetano Veloso
- 1991: Lust, Ambitious Lovers
- 1995: Very Neon Pet, Peter Scherer
- 1997: Terra Incognita, Chris Whitley
- 1998: Black Music, Chocolate Genius
- 1999: Mustango, Jean-Louis Murat
- 1999: Pasajes de un Sueno, Ana Torroja
- 1999: Return of Kill Dog E, Scotty Hard
- 2000 Let's Get Free, Dead Prez
- 2000: Menace to Sobriety, OPM
- 2003: The Rites with Burnt Sugar (Greg Tate), Butch Morris, Pete Cosey (Avant Groidd Musica)
- 2003: Deeper Than Oceans, Kazufumi Miyazawa
- 2004: Ten, Ellery Eskelin
- 2010: Christian Marclay: Graffiti Composition with Elliott Sharp, Mary Halvorson, Lee Ranaldo, Vernon Reid
- 2010: Electric Willie: a Tribute to Willie Dixon with Elliott Sharp, Henry Kaiser, Eric Mingus, Queen Esther, Glenn Phillips, Lance Carter (Yellowbird)
- 2010: The Art of Bellydance, Bellydance Superstars
- 2020: Marching Music, Dave Douglas (Greenleaf)
