= To Tell the Truth (disambiguation) =

To Tell the Truth is an American panel game show that debuted in 1956.

To Tell the Truth may also refer to:

- To Tell the Truth (Canadian game show), a 1962–1964 version of the American game show
- "To Tell the Truth" (Frasier), a 1999 television episode
- "To Tell the Truth" (The Outer Limits), a 1998 television episode
- "To Tell the Truth" (Roseanne), a 1990 television episode
- To Tell the Truth (album) or the title song, by Jaymay, 2016
- To Tell the Truth, a 2005 memoir by Charles Robert Jenkins

== See also ==
- Tell the Truth (disambiguation)
- Tell Us the Truth, a 1978 album by Sham '69
- Lenny Bruce: Swear to Tell the Truth, a 1998 documentary film
- Sworn testimony, including the phrase "swear to tell the truth, the whole truth, and nothing but the truth"
