= Bradshaw Leigh =

American Audio Engineer

Bradshaw (Brad) Leigh
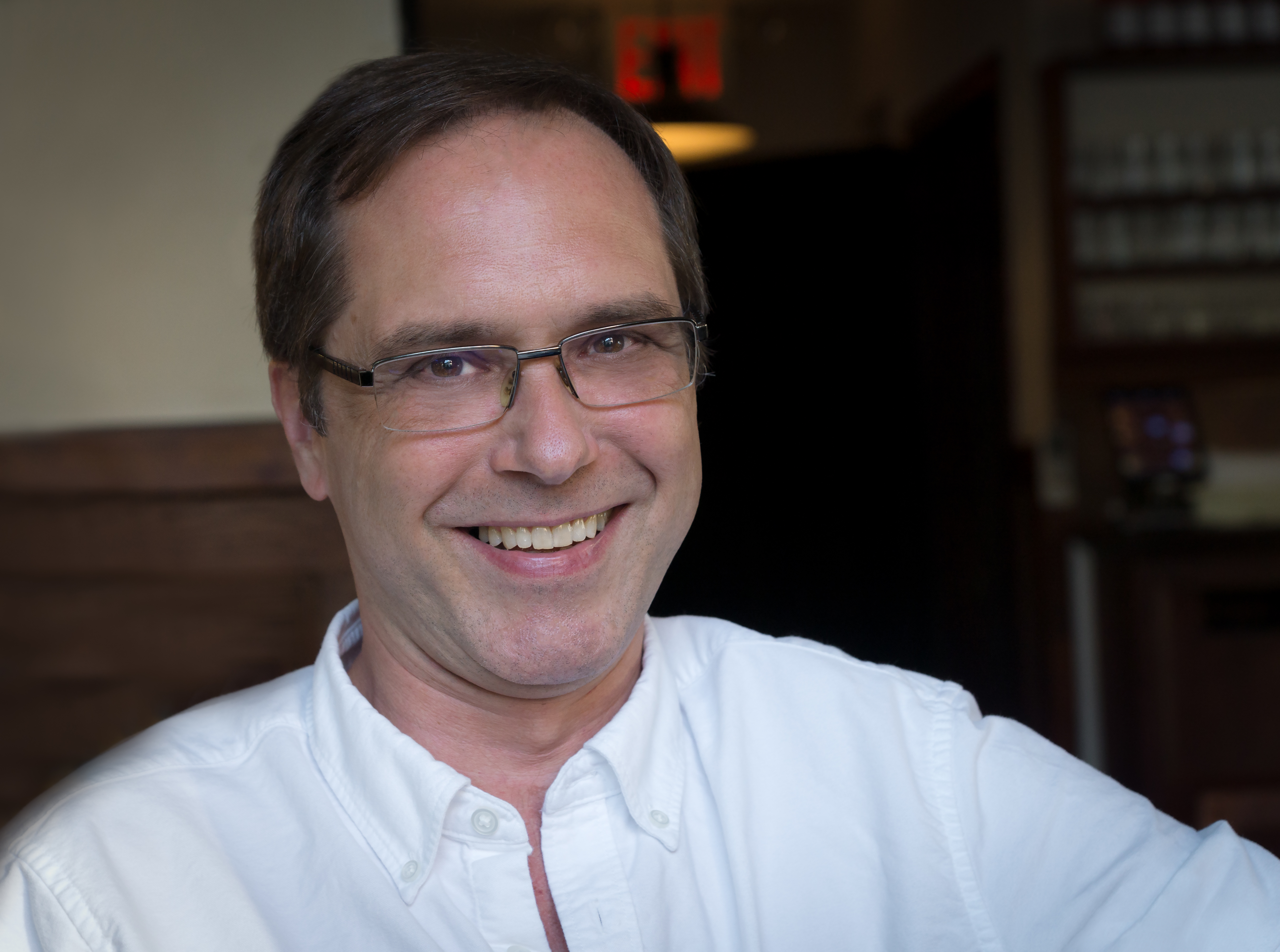

Background information
- Born: New York, NY, U.S.
- Occupation: Audio Engineer
- Website: www.leighaudio.com

Brad Leigh is an American audio engineer, known for having recorded and mixed many recordings including Billy Joel's River of Dreams, Tracy Chapman's Matters of the Heart as well as Julian Lennon's Valotte and Secret Value of Daydreaming

== Biography ==
Brad Leigh was born and raised in New York City. While attending Brooklyn Technical High School, he worked as an usher during concerts at Carnegie Hall. After graduation in 1975, Leigh attended Al Grundy and John Woram's Institute of Audio Research and was then hired at Chelsea Sound by Mark Freeh as an intern/assistant engineer/tech. In 1977, he left Chelsea Sound and took an MCI Factory training course to learn to repair MCI pro audio equipment, after which he was hired as a tech by Don Frey at A&R Recording. It was during this time that Leigh first met producer/engineer and owner of A&R Recording, Phil Ramone. The following year, Leigh became the assistant engineer for Jim Boyer who was Phil Ramone's chief engineer. Leigh assisted Boyer until 1979, when Leigh became Phil Ramone's assistant engineer on Billy Joel's Glass Houses. While assisting Ramone, Leigh worked on albums for Paul Simon, Chicago, and Frank Sinatra. He continued to engineer for Ramone through the late eighties. Leigh's first full engineering credit was for the score/soundtrack for the film Reds followed by the original cast album for Little Shop of Horrors and while freelancing, he went on to engineer for Jimmy Iovine, Russ Titelman, Billy Joel and Davitt Sigerson. Leigh has recorded and mixed live concerts for HBO and Showtime using The Record Plant, Effanel, Sheffield remote recording trucks, and has recorded film scores for Marvin Hamlisch, David Grusin and Carly Simon.

In the late 1990s, Leigh accepted a position as Chief Technical Engineer at Sound on Sound Recording, NYC, where he continued to engineer recordings such as Widespread Panic's Til the Medicine Takes and Five for Fighting's debut, Message for Albert. In 2005, Sound on Sound merged with Right Track Recording, changing its name to MSR Studios. Leigh was Chief Technical Engineer at MSR until its closing in June 2016.

=== Technical Design ===
While at MSR, Leigh designed and manufactured audio equipment including custom dual 18″ subwoofers which were in both Studio A and Studio C and used on countless records as well as high resolution dynamics meters for the Neve VR console, the Procue personal headphone mixing system and a high quality DVD interface for SACD players.

== Selected works ==
Studio Recordings

- Jaymay - Fallin' Like Snow
- Widespread Panic - Til the Medicine Takes
- Tracy Chapman - Matters of the Heart
- Billy Joel - River of Dreams
- Chet Baker - The Best Thing For You
- Bus Stop - Miracle Time
- Cords Taurus - No Bull
- Tanya Blount - Natural Thing
- Malcolm McLaren - Fans
- Billy Joel - An Innocent Man
- Megadeth - Hangar 18 (EP)
- Julio Iglesias - Crazy
- Collision - Collision
- Ten Wings - Wishing Well
- Billy Joel - Complete Hits Collection 1974-1977
- Grupo Miguelito - Grupo Miguelito
- Lazybatsu - Other View
- Best of World Music - “I’m Not Tired” (M. Fashek)
- Majek Fashek - Spirit of Love
- Jude Cole - Jude Cole
- Charles & Eddie - Duophonic
- Julian Lennon - Valotte
- Billy Joel - Nylon Curtain
- The Daou (Vanessa Daou) - Head Music
- Ghost of an American Dream - Skin
- Cords - Gasping
- Carly Simon - Working Girl Sound Track
- Frank Sinatra - L.A. Is My Lady
- Parlor James - Dreadful Sorry
- Five For Fighting - Message For Albert…
- Vernon Reid/Bill T. Jones - Still Here (Live at BAM)
- Madder Rose - Bring it Down
- Peabo Bryson - Through The Fire
- Milla “Gentleman Who Fell” (Single)
- Julian Lennon - The Secret Value of Daydreaming
- Billy Joel - Songs in the Attic
- Joe Jackson - Mike’s Murder
- Famous Charisma Box - Self Titled
- John Waite - Rover’s Return

Live Recordings

- Billy Crystal - Midnight Train to Moscow
- Billy Joel - Koheupt- Live from Leningrad (BBC)
- Wynton Marsalis - The Late Show (BBC)Free To Be A Family Live from the Hard Rock NYC
- Billy Joel - A Matter of Trust (ABC)
- Tallinn - Rock Summer ’88 Pil.
- Big Country - Boris Grebenshikov and Dave Stewart
- Julian Lennon - Stand By Me (Showtime)
- VH-1 Lifebeat Concert (Milla segment)

Film and Broadway

- Jason Robert Brown - Wearing Someone Else's Clothes
- Marvin Hamlisch - The Goodbye Girl
- Carly Simon - Working Girl
- Phil Ramone/Dave Grusin - Reds
- Dave Grusin - Tootsie
- Little Shop of Horrors - Original Cast Album
- Marvin Hamlisch - Winter Garden
- Various artists - D.C. Cab
- Steve Poltz - "Everything About You" for Notting Hill
- Marvin Hamlisch - Men and Women
- Drums of Passion - The Serpent and the Rainbow
