= As the Cry Flows =

Studio album by Seafood
- Released: 3 May 2004
- Genre: Rock
- Length: 45:30
- Label: Cooking Vinyl
- Producer: Ian McCutcheon and Mark Van Hoen

Seafood chronology
When Do We Start Fighting... (2001)	As the Cry Flows (2004)	Paper Crown King (2006)

As the Cry Flows is an album by British band Seafood, released on 3 May 2004.

== Track listing ==
All songs written by Seafood unless otherwise stated.

1. "I Dreamt We Ruled The Sun" – 5:18
2. "Heat Walks Against Me" – 3:36
3. "No Sense Of Home" – 4:31
4. "Summer Falls" – 4:59
5. "Kicking The Walls" – 3:21
6. "Milk And Honey" – 3:45
7. "1324" – 1:34
8. "Sleepover" – 4:59
9. "Good Reason" – 2:40
10. "Orange Rise" – 2:41
11. "Broken Promises" – 3:44
12. "Willow's Song" (Paul Giovanni) – 4:15

== Personnel ==
- David Line - Vocals, guitars
- Kevin Penney - Guitars
- Kevin Hendrick - Bass, vocals
- Caroline Banks - Drums
- Mark Van Hoen - Synthesizers
- Ian McCutcheon - Percussion, keyboards, Hammond organ, backing vocals
- Ed Harcourt - Piano, Hammond organ, Wurlitzer
- Nick Zala - Pedal steel guitar, mandolin
- Sam Lacey - Trumpet
- Ros Murray - Cello
