= Fallin' Like Snow =

Studio album by Jaymay
- Released: December 2, 2016
- Genre: Christmas music; folk rock; indie pop
- Length: 36:04
- Label: Jaymay Music
- Producer: Jaymay, Daniel Belardinelli

Jaymay chronology
To Tell the Truth (2016)	Fallin' Like Snow (2016)

Fallin' Like Snow is the third full-length album by Jaymay, consisting of thirteen Christmas and other winter-themed original compositions and covers. These recordings, together with thirteen others recorded during the same sessions, were originally released online as a 26-song "advent calendar" for fans, released one per day in December 2015.

The opening track of the album, "This Is a Christmas Song, My Love", was named 2016's "Best Holiday Song" by Blurt.

== Track listing ==
All songs written by Jaymay except where noted.

1. "This Is a Christmas Song, My Love" – 2:17
2. "Winter Wonderland" (F. Bernard, R. Smith) – 2:28
3. "Up in the Sky" – (Jaymay, G. Go) 3:48
4. "For Christ's Sake, Pick Up the Phone!" – 2:59
5. "Carol of the Bells" (M. Leontovich, P. Wilhousky) – 1:27
6. "Farewell, New York" – 2:57
7. "Up on the Housetop" (B. Hanby) – 2:34
8. "Santa's Little Helper" – 2:29
9. "My Evergreen" (T. Maxwell) – 2:37
10. "Silent Night" (F. Gruber, J. Mohr) – 2:46
11. "Little Drummer Girl" (K. Davis, H. Onorati, H. Simeone) – 2:23
12. "Fallin' Like Snow" – 3:51
13. "Ave Maria" (traditional) – 3:26

== Personnel ==
Musicians

- Jaymay – vox, guitar, electric guitar
- Daniel Belardinelli – piano, keyboards, celesta
- Taylor McLam – guitars, bass, drums
- David Luther – saxophone
- Lara Somogyi – harp
- Mike Block – cello
- Hanneke Cassel – violin
- Alexander MacDonald – tap dance
- Tyler Chester – bass on 2
- Gary Go – vox on 3
- UCLA Lab School Intermediate kids directed by Nick Kello – vox on 3
- Jonathan Monroe – guitar on 6
- The City of Prague Philharmonic Orchestra conducted by Paul Bateman
- The Manhattan Choral Ensemble directed by Thomas Cunningham – Molly Austin, Matt Borgmeyer, Tom Blanchard, Nancy Brandler, Connie Brooks, Evelyn Chu, Covey Crolius, Tom Davidson, Liz Davis, Alison Dolinger, Dave Erbach, Adam Guzik, Stephanie Hagan, Elizabeth Healy, Erin Hillmar, Greg Johnson, Danielle Marchand, Dan Melius, Laura O'Reilly, David Prestigiacomo, Paola Rekalde, Arden Rogow-Bales, Julie Strauss, Gwen Thompson, Blake Wandesforde, Thomas Wang, Risa Ward, Evelyn Way, Brian Wong

Production

- Jaymay – producer, arranger, orchestrator
- Daniel Belardinelli – producer, arranger, orchestrator
- Patrick MacDougall – mixing
- Brad Leigh – mixing
- Satoshi Mark Noguchi – mixing
- Colleen Lutz – engineer assistant
- Oscar Zambrano – mastering
- Bill Wadman – cover photograph
- The City of Prague Philharmonic Orchestra recorded at Smecky Studios, Prague
- Jan Holzner – Orchestra Recording Engineer
- James Fitzpatrick – Orchestra Contractor & Session Producer
- Daniel Clive McCallum - Orchestration
- David Krystal, Kevin Smithers – Additional Orchestration & Music Preparation
