= When Do We Start Fighting... =

Studio album by Seafood
- Released: July 2001
- Recorded: ????
- Genre: Rock
- Length: 48:46
- Label: Infectious
- Producer: Eli Janney

Seafood chronology
Surviving the Quiet (2000)	When Do We Start Fighting... (2001)	As the Cry Flows (2004)

Professional ratings
Review scores
Source	Rating
AllMusic	2.5/5 stars
Kerrang!	4/5 stars

When Do We Start Fighting... is an album by British band Seafood, released in July 2001.

The track "What May Be The Oldest" originally featured on the b-side of the "Led By Bison" single from Seafood's previous album Surviving the Quiet. The re-recorded version on When Do We Start Fighting... features vocals from former Madder Rose singer Mary Lorson.

== Track listing ==
All songs written by Seafood.

1. "Intro" – 0:39
2. "Cloaking" – 2:34
3. "Western Battle" – 3:37
4. "Pleasurehead" – 4:00
5. "What May Be The Oldest" – 3:10
6. "People Are Underestimated" – 4:50
7. "Splinter" – 3:40
8. "In This Light Will You Fight Me?" – 5:14
9. "Desert Stretched Before The Sun" – 3:20
10. "Similar Assassins" – 4:31
11. "He Collects Dust" – 5:34
  - "Clueso" (hidden track) – 3:07

The track listing as given on the album's sleeve lists track 1 as "Cloaking", track 2 as "Western Battle" etc. omitting to mention that the album actually starts with "Intro".

On the album's initial release a limited edition of 5000 copies was produced in card sleeves with added multimedia content including movies, a diary, screensaver and a Seafood game. Early copies of this limited edition were signed by the band.

The album was re-released in March 2002 with a bonus disc entitled Coursework featuring demos and live session tracks. The Coursework CD was also available to order from Seafood's official website and features the following tracks:

1. "Cloaking (Demo)" – 2:34
2. "In This Light Will You Fight Me? (Demo)" – 4:59
3. "Similar Assassins (Demo)" – 3:45
4. "People Are Underestimated (Session track)" – 3:10
5. "What May Be The Oldest (Session track)" – 3:09
6. "Porchlight (Session track)" – 5:31

=== US track listing ===
1. "Intro"/"Splinter" – 4:17
2. "Western Battle" – 3:37
3. "What May Be The Oldest" – 3:10
4. "Pleasurehead" – 4:00
5. "Cloaking" – 2:34
6. "Similar Assassins" – 4:31
7. "People Are Underestimated" – 4:50
8. "Desert Stretched Before The Sun" – 3:20
9. "In This Light Will You Fight Me?" – 5:14
10. "He Collects Dust" – 5:34
  - "Clueso" (hidden track) – 3:07

== Personnel ==
- David Line - Vocals, guitars
- Kevin Hendrick - Bass, vocals
- Charles MacLeod - Guitars
- Caroline Banks - Drums, vocals

=== additional musicians ===
- Mary Lorson - Vocals on "What May Be The Oldest"
- Scott McCloud - Spoken word on "He Collects Dust"
- Pete de Boer - Additional screaming on "He Collects Dust"
- Ben Hutchinson - Percussion
- Eli Janney - Keyboards
