= Seafood (band) =

British band

- Origin: London, England,
- Genres: Rock; Alternative; Punk
- Years active: 1996–2009
- Labels: Fierce Panda, Infectious, Cooking Vinyl,
- Members: David Line; Caroline Banks; Kevin Penney
- Past members: Charles MacLeod; Kevin Hendrick

Seafood were a UK band formed in London around 1996.

The line-up included chief songwriter David Line (vocals, guitar), Caroline Banks (drums and backing vocals) and Kevin Penney (guitars) who joined the band following the departure of founder-member Charles MacLeod. Bassist and founder member Kevin Hendrick left the group to join Pre/Male Bonding following the recording of their fourth album Paper Crown King in 2006, and was not permanently replaced. Cahir O'Doherty, from Fighting with Wire and Jetplane Landing, played bass on numerous tours.

== Band History ==
=== Early years ===
Seafood were formed on 31 August 1996 by David and Charles, who advertised for a female bassist and male drummer in classified magazine Loot. The line-up turned out differently – a female drummer and male bassist – but, happily, this worked out and Seafood played their first gig at Camden's Dublin Castle in March 1997. Seafood were signed to Fierce Panda Records after their fourth gig in London's Highbury Garage. The band claim that they could have been signed at their third gig, had the representative of Fierce Panda not been too drunk from a Kerrang! magazine party to turn up in time to see their set.

Seafood came to the attention of the music press with the release of "Scorch Comfort" on Fierce Panda, a noisy but melodic track that was oddly compared to both Sonic Youth and Bis. This was followed by the release of "Psychic Rainy Nights" on Kooky Records, and "Porchlight" on Fierce Panda. All of these singles were eventually compiled with their b-sides on the Messenger in the Camp mini-album.

At this time, Seafood embarked on two national tours, one supporting Kenickie, and the other as part of the "Panda in a Vanda" record label tour with Billy Mahonie and Tiny Too. They also played support slots for Laptop, Grandaddy and Dawn of the Replicants, amongst others. Seafood played as a three-piece at the Reading Festival after Charles lacerated his hands in an accident, ending with a 10-minute noise version of Walking in the Air as made popular by choir-boy Aled Jones. 1998 ended with the release of Messenger in the Camp, and a gig at London's LSE.

In 1999, Seafood headed off on tour again, this time with Idlewild and Llama Farmers, and returned to play a full set at the Reading Festival. They also made their American debut at the CMJ band marathon.

=== Surviving The Quiet and When Do We Start Fighting ===
1999 also the year they recorded their debut album, Surviving the Quiet. Produced by Ian McCutcheon the album was released by Fierce Panda Records worldwide in January 2000. The LP included flutes, cello, acoustic and electric guitar and a 10-minute noise breakdown on the last track. Four singles were released from Surviving the Quiet: "Easy Path" and "This Is Not An Exit" were both released before the album, and "Belt" and "Led by Bison" which were released after the album.

After the release of the LP, Seafood toured extensively during 2000, firstly with Wilt and Turn, then with Gerling. They also did a short tour of the US, playing with Jimmy Eat World and Hot Rod Circuit.

In 2001, Seafood continued touring as well as beginning the recording of their follow-up to Surviving the Quiet. The second LP, When Do We Start Fighting... was recorded and produced in New York by Girls Against Boys member Eli Janney. It featured guest appearances by Mary Lorson of Madder Rose and Scott McCloud of Girls Against Boys.

The album release in July 2001 (on Infectious Records) was preceded by the release of "Cloaking" as a single. The release of two further singles, "Splinter" and "Western Battle" followed in December 2001 and March 2002 respectively. 2001 saw a Seafood headlining a tour with Easyworld as support, they also opened for Sportfreunde Stiller in Germany, and My Vitriol and Ash on their UK tours.

In 2002 the band toured with Dashboard Confessional in the US, played a long UK tour with Jetplane Landing, supported Jimmy Eat World on their UK tour and played their own headline UK tour with Crackout as support.

After this tour, Seafood spent time working on building a studio, Neat Science Laboratories, in preparation for recording their next album, eventually released in the summer of 2004. During this time, Seafood played only a handful of gigs due to problems with singer David Line's health following the collapse of one of his lungs.

=== As The Cry Flows, Paper Crown King and split ===
As the Cry Flows was recorded with Surviving The Quiet producer Ian McCutcheon at the end of 2003, and released by Cooking Vinyl records in May 2004. An attempt at touring the record around the time of its release was cut short when David Line's lung problem flared up again. However, they were able to finally tour the UK in late 2004, and Europe in early 2005. After the conclusion of their European tour, the band retreated to write songs for their next release.

On 17 September 2005, the band played their first live show for almost six months, at the 2nd annual Smalltown America Records Charity All-Dayer at London's 93 Feet East venue, where they played a set that consisted almost entirely of new material.

The band embarked on their first national tour of the UK for several years in July 2006 and released the single "Signal Sparks" on the 31st of that month. The band's fourth album, Paper Crown King, followed in September of the same year. In early May 2007 Seafood announced, via their website, that they would be releasing covers of The Cure's "Lovesong" and Townes Van Zandt's "I'll be Here in the Morning" as a double A-side download-only single on 11 June to accompany their May/June UK tour.

In mid-2009 it was announced via the band's website that Seafood no longer exists, but each member of the band continues to work in various side projects.

Seafood on Facebook

== Discography ==
Albums

- Messenger in the Camp (1998)
- Surviving the Quiet (2000)
- When Do We Start Fighting... (2001)
- As the Cry Flows (2004)
- Paper Crown King (2006)

Singles

- "Scorch Comfort"
- "Psychic Rainy Nights"
- "Porchlight"
- "Easy Path"
- "This Is Not An Exit"
- "Belt"
- "Led By Bison"
- "Cloaking"
- "Splinter" (December 2001)
- "Coursework" EP (2001)
- "Western Battle" (March 2002)
- "Pleasurehead" (June 2002, split single with Jetplane Landing)
- "Summer Falls" (March 2004)
- "Good Reason" (April 2004)
- "Sleepover" (October 2004)
- "Signal Sparks" (July 2006)
- "I Will Talk" (October 2006)
- "Lovesong" / "I'll be Here in the Morning" (June 2007)

DVD

- "Seafood: Where have you been?" (October 2009)
