= Crackout (band) =

British pop punk band

- Origin: Bicester, Oxfordshire, England
- Genre: Pop punk / indie
- Years active: 1997–2005
- Labels: Shifty Disco (1998); Hut Recordings (2001–2004)
- Spinoffs: Blackholes; Out of the Afternoon
- Members: Steven Eagles; Nicholas Millard; Jack Dunkley
- Past members: Rachel Lavelle

Crackout were an English three-piece pop punk band formed in Bicester, Oxfordshire, in 1997. The band released two albums and a handful of singles and toured with artists such as Sum 41, Seafood, Haven and Span before disbanding in late 2005.

== Career ==
The band, singer-guitarist Steven Eagles, drummer Nicholas Millard and bassist Rachel Lavelle, were all 16 years old when they signed to the Shifty Disco label after playing only eight gigs as 'Crackout' (named after 'Brian Krakow', a character in the American TV teen drama My So-Called Life). Within four weeks of the record label first seeing the band live, they had recorded and released their debut "Chuck" single. An album was also recorded around this time, but was never released. Lavelle was replaced in 1999 by Jack Dunkley when Lavelle and the rest of the band drifted apart in the last year of school due to differing life plans.

Crackout toured with Sick of It All / 28 Days in late December 2000, where they sold a self-released tape containing early recordings of "Breakout" and "Joey Lost His Mind" (both later re-recorded and included on debut album This Is Really Neat). "EP1", a 500-limited edition CD with four songs showing early promise, and "EP2" shortly followed in 2001. Both EPs came with a free sticker and in a hand-numbered cardboard sleeve, finished with a wax seal (red on "EP1"; green on "EP2"). Their debut album, This Is Really Neat, was released that October featuring artwork by Jane Wooster Scott.

In 2002, plans to release old favourite "Volume" (the B-side to their first single, later re-recorded and featured on This Is Really Neat) were scrapped when, "I Am the One", was used in an advert for Salomon Sports. "Volume" was therefore the only Crackout song not released as a single with its own music video.

After long delays, the band's follow up to This Is Really Neat was released in March 2004. However, the promotion for Oh No! was ended abruptly due to EMI deciding to close down Hut Recordings shortly after the album's release. Whilst making plans for a third album, their record producer friend Clive Langer, also the producer of Oh No!, asked them if they were interested in playing on a film soundtrack which he was scoring. This resulted in Crackout being cast for small roles in Brothers of the Head, the 2006 mockumentary based on the 1977 novel by Brian Aldiss.

In 2005, Crackout toyed with the idea of adding an extra member to provide them with options with guitars, keyboards and backing vocals live. This led to a few low-key gigs with additional member Simon Plumbley in October that year. After playing these gigs, however, they felt like too much time had passed since their last shows and decided to disband Crackout, leaving the following statement on their now archived website.

Dear All,

Sadly, after a few years of incredible fun, we have decided to end Crackout. While we are still the best of friends and intend on continuing with music, it just didn't seem right to continue with Crackout any longer. While we were involved with other projects, too much time had passed since we last toured and when we came back to play the recent gigs. Although those gigs were enjoyable to play, we simply felt at odds with our past and unable to continue.

From the bottom of our hearts, we thank you all for your support,

Steven, Nick and Jack.

== Post-Crackout ==
Despite Crackout disbanding, Eagles, Millard, Dunkley and Plumbley formed a new group called 'Blackholes' in 2006 and released "The Alcohol EP" through their MySpace profile, featuring a couple of tracks played at their last few Crackout gigs. During this time, Eagles, Millard and Dunkley also played in French pop act Vanessa and the O's in a few of their live shows.

It was announced in 2007 that Dunkley had left the original lineup due to 'creative differences', with Alex Szrok replacing him on bass. In September of the same year, Blackholes decided to regroup, changing the name of the band to 'Out of the Afternoon'. Out of the Afternoon released their first record 'The Bird EP' in 2008, which was followed by a single, "I Won't Forget You" released in June 2010. The group have since disbanded.

During 2008 Millard played drums for The Kooks whilst Paul Garred, the usual drummer in the band, was sidelined with an arm injury.

Millard started studying International Agriculture at Hadlow College in 2011. In May 2013, as a second year mature student, he was awarded Pinnacle Business Management Gold Award, the Nickerson Cup and a cheque for £2,000 for his plans for developing and producing Buckinghamshire's first artisan cheese for more than a century.

Eagles now works as a guitar tech, having worked with the likes of The Darkness.

== Discography ==
=== Albums ===
- This Is Really Neat (2001, Hut Recordings, CD / ltd Gatefold CD / 12" vinyl)
- Oh No! (2004, Hut Recordings, CD / 12" vinyl)

=== Singles ===
- "Demo Tape" (December 1997, self released, ltd 100 tape)
- "Chuck" (1998, Shifty Disco, ltd 1000 CD)
- "Gig Tape" (2000, self released, tape only available on the Sick of It All / 28 Days / Crackout tour)
- "EP1" (2001, Precious Cargo, ltd 500 CD)
- "EP2" (2001, Precious Cargo, ltd 500 CD)
- "You Dumb Fuck" (2001, Hut Recordings, CD / 7" vinyl) – UK No. 87
- "I Am the One" (2002, Hut Recordings, CD / 7" vinyl) – UK No. 72
- "Out of Our Minds" (2003, Hut Recordings, CD / 7" vinyl, DVD) – UK No. 63
- "This Is What We Do" (2004, Hut Recordings, CD1 / CD2 / 7" vinyl) – UK No. 65
