= Obuchowski =

Obuchowski (feminine: Obuchowska; plural: Obuchowscy) is a Polish surname. Notable people with this surname include:

- David Obuchowski, American rock musician
- Eugeniusz Obuchowski (born 1933), Polish horse breeder and politician
- Irena Obuchowska (1932–2016), Polish psychologist
- Iwona Obuchowska, Polish ophthalmologist
- Kazimierz Obuchowski (1931–2014), Polish psychologist
- Michael J. Obuchowski (born 1952), American politician
- Nancy Obuchowski (born 1962), American biostatistician and radiologist
- Wojciech Obuchowski, Polish revolutionary, participant in the November Uprising of 1830
