= Long Walk to Never EP =

Long Walk to Never

EP by Jaymay
- Released: September 2, 2010
- Genre: Folk rock Indie pop
- Label: Jaymay Music
- Producer: Jaymay with Chris Mitchell

Jaymay chronology
LVNG RM EP (2010)	Long Walk to Never (2010)	10UNDER2 (2012)

All of the songs from the Long Walk to Never EP (and ten others by Jaymay) are featured in the 2010 film HappyThankYouMorePlease, for which "Never Be Daunted" was shortlisted for the Academy of Motion Pictures Arts & Sciences' Best Original Song Academy Award. "All Souls" was also featured in the 2010 film Barney's Version, and "Long Walk to Never" in 2014's There's Always Woodstock.

The vocals and guitar for this EP were recorded on GarageBand using only the computer's internal microphone.

The cover photo was taken by Jaymay's Uncle Vincent and features her mother and her mother's siblings walking with an "intelligent horse".

== Track listing ==
All songs written by Jaymay

1. "All Souls" - 2:49
2. "Long Walk to Never" - 1:55
3. "One May Die So Lonely" - 3:37
4. "Never Be Daunted" - 2:17
5. "Rock Scissors Paper (RSP)" - 2:01

== Personnel ==
Musicians

- Jaymay - All instruments except:
- Chris Mitchell - Piano, drums, glockenspiel & melodica on 1 and 2
- Jared Engel - Bass on 1 and 2
- Mike Block - Cello & violin on 1 and 2
- Steve Lewis - Guitar on 1
- Jay Foote - Bass on 5

Production

- Jaymay - Producer, Engineer, Cover design
- Chris Mitchell - Producer, Engineer
- Patrick MacDougall - Mixing
- Robert Vosgien - Mastering
- Rory Wilson - Album layout
