= Tragic Magic (Madder Rose album) =

Studio album by Madder Rose
- Released: 1997
- Label: Atlantic
- Producer: Billy Coté

Madder Rose chronology
Panic On (1994)	Tragic Magic (1997)	Hello June Fool (1999)

Tragic Magic, also stylized as tragicmagic, is an album by the American band Madder Rose, released in 1997. The band promoted the album by touring with Junior Cottonmouth.

== Production ==
The album was produced by bandmember Billy Coté, who also wrote most of the lyrics. It was Madder Rose's first album with bass player Chris Giammalvo. The band added elements of funk and hip hop to its sound. Later editions of the album contain different opening tracks, "Narco" and "Jailbird".

== Critical reception ==
Professional ratings
Review scores
Source	Rating
AllMusic	3.5/5 stars
The Encyclopedia of Popular Music	3/5 stars
Entertainment Weekly	B−
The Evening Post	4/5 stars
Los Angeles Daily News	3/4 stars
MusicHound Rock: The Essential Album Guide	3.5/5 stars
The Republican	1/5 stars

Entertainment Weekly wrote that the album "is frustratingly half-baked and suffers from near-funereal pacing... Fortunately, Mary Lorson's lighter-than-air vocals counter even the most sedative of tracks." The Washington Post thought that "the melodies are sturdy... It's tunes like 'Hung Up in You', more than the revisited folk-hop sound, that provides most of the album's appeal." The Los Angeles Daily News praised the "innovative, bass-heavy sound and standout songs." The Republican opined that "the seductive grooves of 'My Star', and the mildly appealing '(She's a) Satellite', are two of the only salvageable moments here."

The Dayton Daily News stated: "Sometimes laid-back jazzy, sometimes spacey coffeehouse pop, always lyrically introspective, there really isn't a bad cut here." Guitar Player called Coté a "vibey and tasteful popster," writing that he "dials in a music store's worth of tones-pristine arpeggios, scritchy wah washes, fuzzy flashbacks, surf solos, hypnotic noir motifs."

AllMusic wrote that, "as if to signal that they were still hip, Madder Rose incorporated heavy elements of trip-hop on Tragic Magic, and while that gambit failed for some of their peers, the band manages to blend the dance and guitar-pop well."

== Track listing ==
No.	Title	Length
1.	"My Star"
2.	"Real Feel"
3.	"Float to the Top"
4.	"Hung Up in You"
5.	"Delight's Pool"
6.	"(She's a) Satellite"
7.	"Peter and Victor"
8.	"Best Friend"
9.	"Scenes from 'Starbright'"
10.	"Midnight on the Dot"
11.	"Don Greene"
12.	"Not Perfect"

UK version with alterative tracks and mixes
No.	Title	Length
1.	"Narco"
2.	"Jailbird"
3.	"My Star"
4.	"Real Feel"
5.	"Float to the Top"
6.	"Hung Up in You"
7.	"Delight's Pool"
8.	"Peter & Victor"
9.	"Best Friend"
10.	"Scenes from "Starbright""
11.	"Don Greene"
12.	"Not Perfect"

Uk versions of Tragic Magic were labeled with alternative tracks and mixes
