= Tell the Truth =

Tell the Truth may refer to:

== Arts, entertainment, and media ==
- Tell the Truth (film), 1946
- "Tell the Truth", a 1958 song by The "5" Royales
- Tell the Truth (Otis Redding album), 1970, or the title song
- "Tell the Truth" (Derek and the Dominos song), 1970
- "Tell the Truth" (Jude Cole song), 1992
- "Tell the Truth", a song by 2nd Chapter of Acts from the 1980 album The Roar of Love
- Tell the Truth (Billy Squier album), 1993
- Tell the Truth (British game show)

== Other uses ==
- Tell the Truth!, political campaign in the Republic of Belarus

== See also ==
- To Tell the Truth (disambiguation)
- Tell Us the Truth (1978 album) by Sham '69
- Lenny Bruce: Swear to Tell the Truth (1998 film) documentary
- sworn testimony, including the phrase "swear, to tell the truth, the whole truth, and nothing but the truth"
