= Bring It Down =

Bring it Down

Studio album by Madder Rose
- Released: 1993
- Genres: Alternative rock, indie pop
- Length: 49:53
- Label: Seed
- Producer: Kevin Salem

Madder Rose chronology
Bring it Down (1993)	Panic On (1994)

Bring It Down is the debut album by New York City-based alternative rock band Madder Rose. It was released in 1993 on Seed Records, an alternative-oriented subsidiary of Big Beat Records, and was produced by Kevin Salem. In the United Kingdom, the album was released by Revolver Distribution, and its song "Swim" was released as an import single there. "Swim" increased the band's popularity in the UK thanks to the single's promotion by John Peel of the BBC. As of March 5, 1994, the album had sold 10,000 copies in the UK.

== Reception ==
Bring it Down received mainly positive reviews upon its release, and prompted many British critics to proclaim Madder Rose as the second coming of the Velvet Underground. The album's title track was named the 27th best song of 1993 by NME. It has been described, retrospectively, as "an amalgam of driving beats, searing guitars, and sweet vocals." Another favorable retrospective assessment came from Everett True, who wrote in 2009 that the album was "pretty gorgeous". In addition, in a favorable review, Rachel Felder compared Madder Rose's guitar sound to that of Dinosaur Jr. and My Bloody Valentine. However, some critics, such as Peter Margasak, criticized the album for sounding too much like typical indie rock.

Professional ratings
Review scores
Source	Rating
AllMusic	4.5/5 stars
Chicago Tribune	3.5/4 stars
Entertainment Weekly	(positive)
The Village Voice	(choice cut)

== Track listing ==
1. Beautiful John
2. While Away
3. Bring It Down
4. 20 Foot Red
5. Swim
6. Lay Down Low
7. Altar Boy
8. Lights Go Down
9. (Living A) Daydream
10. Sugarsweet
11. Razor Pilot
12. Waiting for Engines
13. Pocket Fulla Medicine

== Personnel ==
- Alan Bezozi-Drum Programming
- Diane Carpentieri-Design
- Billy Coté -Bass, Composer, Guitar, Guitar (Rhythm)
- Brian Doherty-Drums
- Johnny Kick-Drums, Vocals (Background)
- Adam Lasus-Engineer, Mixing
- Bradshaw Leigh-Mixing
- Mary Lorson-Composer, Guitar, Vocals
- James MacMillan-Engineer
- Madder Rose-Primary Artist
- Kevin Salem-Drum Programming, Drums, Engineer, Guest Artist, Producer
- Matt Verta-Ray-Bass, Composer, Guitar (Rhythm), Slide Guitar, Vocals (Background)
