= Jane Scott =

Jane Scott may refer to:

- Jane Scott, Duchess of Buccleuch (1929–2011), British peeress
- Jane Scott (film producer), Australian film producer
- Jane Scott, Baroness Scott of Bybrook (born 1947), British politician
- Jane Scott (rock critic) (1919–2011), American rock critic
- Jane Scott (theatre manager) (1779–1839), 19th century theater manager, actor, and playwright
- Jane Scott, Countess of Dalkeith (1701–1729)
- Jane Wooster Scott, American painter
