= Enlighten Me =

Enlighten Me may refer to:

- "Enlighten Me" (Echo & the Bunnymen song), 1990
- "Enlighten Me" (Grouplove song)
- "Enlighten Me" (Masterplan song)
- Enlighten Me (album), a 2015 album by Jaymay
