= To Tell the Truth (album) =

Studio album by Jaymay
- Released: August 26, 2016
- Genre: Folk rock; indie pop
- Length: 42:03
- Label: Jaymay Music
- Producer: Jaymay, Jay Foote, Philip Mohn

Jaymay chronology
10UNDER2 EP (2012)	To Tell the Truth (2016)	Fallin' Like Snow (2016)

To Tell the Truth is the second full-length album by Jaymay, released in 2016.

The thirteen songs on this album are about Jaymay's personal struggles during the preceding few years, including intense pain from Crohn's disease that forced her to cancel her 2013 tour, and the death of her developmentally disabled sister, Cassie, for whom "Cassie's Song" is named. A percentage of the funding for the album that Jaymay raised through PledgeMusic was donated to The Center for Discovery in Monticello, New York, where Cassie went to school.

The album's cover image is of glass tiles arranged in a "TTTT" pattern, which was photographed at the beach at the end of the street on which Jaymay lived as a child.

== Critical reception ==
Popdose called the songs on the album "simply sweet and well-constructed" and that Jaymay "clearly has the goods as a singer and songwriter." Bust Magazine rated the album 3 out of 5, saying that "Jaymay’s evolution as an artist continues, as she excavates her emotional pain for artistic fuel."

== Track listing ==
All songs written by Jaymay, except where indicated

1. "Baby, Maybe One Day" – 2:38
2. "I Was Only Lovin' You" – 2:54
3. "To Tell the Truth" – 4:03
4. "Never Weep" (adapted from "For Una" by Robinson Jeffers) – 3:25
5. "Just Got Over You" – 2:10
6. "Enlighten Me" – 7:07
7. "I Stand Up for Me" – 3:28
8. "Today & Tmoro" – 3:30
9. "Cassie's Song" – 3:35
10. "For Goodness Sake" – 1:54
11. "Singin' of the Birds" – 2:14
12. "There Are Red Roses" – 3:07
13. "We Say Goodbye" – 2:04

== Personnel ==
Musicians

- Jaymay – vox, guitars, glockenspiel, drum programming, percussion, keys, violin, accordion
- Jay Foote – bass, mellotron flutes, moog synth, acoustic guitar
- Alex Foote – guitars, piano
- James McAlister – drums, percussion
- Patrick MacDougall – trumpet
- Karen Waltuch – viola
- Nico Georis – piano on 6
- Mike Block – cello, mandolin, violin on 6
- Aaron Dugan – electric guitar on 6
- Elmo Lovano – drums on 6
- Philip Mohn – guitars, mandolin on 2, 3, 9, 13
- Terje Stølde – bass on 2, 3, 9, 13
- Tomas Pettersen – drums, percussion on 2, 3, 9, 13

Production

- Jaymay – producer, TTTT iPhone photos
- Jay Foote – producer, engineer
- Patrick MacDougall – mixing, mastering, remastering
- Philip Mohn – production, mixing on 2, 3, 9, 13
- Tomas Pettersen – co-production, mixing on 2, 3, 9, 13
- Sverre Dæhli – Mastering
