= Things to Come (Rez Abbasi album) =

Studio album by Rez Abbasi
- Released: August 25, 2009
- Recorded: December 15 & 16, 2008 and January 20, 2009
- Studio: Systems Two, Brooklyn. NY
- Genre: Jazz
- Length: 58:41
- Label: Sunnyside; SSC 1236
- Producer: Michael Marciano

Rez Abbasi chronology
Bazaar (2006)	Things to Come (2009)	Natural Selection (2010)

Things to Come is an album by guitarist Rez Abbasi which was recorded in late 2008 and early 2009 and released on the Sunnyside label.

== Critical reception ==
Professional ratings
Review scores
Source	Rating
Allmusic	4/5 stars
All About Jazz	4.5/5 stars
All About Jazz	4.5/5 stars

The Allmusic review by Thom Jurek stated "Abbasi's complex lyric lines – which were all composed on instruments other than guitar – engage his sidemen to solo through them and arrive at a destination that creates yet another possibility. Iyer in particular pushes the melodic frame of each tune with his percussive, intricate approach to counterpoint, whereas Mahanthappa traverses along the outside of these edges and Abbasi changes his soloing style for each tune. But it's the rhythm section that astonishes most on this set. The variations on themes, on other rhythmic structures, and on striated time figures are all offered to the listener as a unified whole. Ultimately, Things to Come is ... more proof in the pudding that the integration of South Asian music into the jazz idiom and its tradition is complete, creating entirely new possibilities for both. This is not an album that sums up the past, but brilliantly and soulfully points to new futures".

In Guitar Player Barry Cleveland wrote " this latest recording from the Pakistani-American guitarist represents another step forward in the realization of his personal vision... Abbasi's compositions are highly sophisticated and complex, containing myriad polyrhythmic crosscurrents and dynamic shifts, yet he and his crew brilliantly navigate these challenging waters without ever forsaking the groove or losing sight of the emotional landscape underlying them. Abbasi's guitar playing is magnificent throughout, whether comping behind the other soloists, intertwining with Mahanthrappa's scintillating sax excursions, or stepping out front. His tones are warm and seductive, and his superb phrasing and ornamentation elevate what would otherwise be merely formidable bop chops into the empyrean realms of fusion mastery".

On All About Jazz Mark F. Turner noted "It would be in incorrect to state that Abbasi has arrived, with his already impressive body of work, but Things To Come, as aptly titled, signals a new chapter in the evolution of a masterful musician and thinker, leaving much anticipation for what he'll deliver next". On the same sire Glenn Astarita said "With his sixth outing as a leader, Pakistani-American guitar hero Rez Abbasi continues to reinvent himself, both musically and ideologically. He intertwines the quest for growth with a sense of humanity on this compelling release. Interspersed with ceremonious Eastern song-forms, Abbasi helps turn a new leaf on the sometimes staid, progressive-jazz realm".

== Track listing ==
All compositions by Rez Abbasi

1. "Dream State" – 8:07
2. "Air Traffic" – 8:09
3. "Hard Colors" – 7:07
4. "Things to Come" – 2:03
5. "Why Me Why Them" – 7:32
6. "Within Sanity" – 11:03
7. "Realities of Chromaticism" – 9:07
8. "Insulin" – 5:38

== Personnel ==
- Rez Abbasi – guitar
- Rudresh Mahanthappa – alto saxophone
- Vijay Iyer – piano
- Johannes Weidenmueller – bass
- Dan Weiss – drums
- Kiran Ahluwalia – vocals (tracks 2–4 & 6)
- Mike Block – cello (tracks 2 & 7)
