= Autumn Fallin' =

Studio album by Jaymay
- Released: November 12, 2007 (UK); March 11, 2008 (US)
- Genres: Folk rock Indie pop
- Length: 42:11
- Labels: Heavenly Recordings; Blue Note
- Producers: Jaymay with Jared Engel, Louis Schefano and Nico Georis

Jaymay chronology
Sea Green, See Blue EP (2006)	Autumn Fallin' (2007)	LVNG RM EP (2010)

Professional ratings
Review scores
Source	Rating
The Guardian	(not rated)
musicOMH	4/5 stars
NY Daily News	(not rated)
The Observer	4/5 stars
Paste	(not rated)
Spin	(not rated)
The Times	3/5 stars
The Washington Post	(not rated)

Autumn Fallin' is the debut album by American singer-songwriter Jaymay. It was released by Heavenly Recordings in the United Kingdom on November 12, 2007 and by Blue Note Records in the United States on March 11, 2008.

The track "Sea Green, See Blue" was used in the 2010 film The Switch, a 2009 episode of ABC's Brothers & Sisters, and the second season finale of the CBS TV series How I Met Your Mother.

== Track listing ==
All songs written by Jaymay

1. "Gray Or Blue" - 3:24
2. "Sycamore Down" - 2:17
3. "Blue Skies" - 3:56
4. "Sea Green, See Blue" - 6:17
5. "Autumn Fallin'" - 2:44
6. "You'd Rather Run" - 9:50
7. "Hard to Say" - 1:57
8. "Big Ben" - 3:30
9. "Ill Willed Person" - 3:19
10. "You Are the Only One I Love" - 4:57

== Credits ==
=== Musicians ===
- Jaymay - All instruments, with:
- Jonathan Ahrens - Bass on 5, 7 and 9
- Ryan Anderson - Clarinet and vocals on 10
- Jared Engel - Various instruments on 1
- Nico Georis - Keyboards and accordion on 5, piano on 7, keyboards on 9, piano solo on 10
- Bobby Hartry - Guitar on 5 and 9
- Julian Raymond - Bass on 3
- Louis Schefano - Various instruments on 6 and 10, drums on 3, vocals on 8
- Aaron Sterling - Drums on 5, drums and percussion on 7 and 9
- Julia Singleton, Calina de la Mare, Sally Herbert and Gini Ball - Violins on 3
- Dinah Beamish, Emily Burridge and Rory MacFarlane - Cellos on 3
- Samantha Seerman, Cassandra Seerman, Dave Seerman, Diana Seerman, Reed Seerman, Chubs Seerman, Susan Seerman, David Seerman, Alexandra Rappaport, Rex Rappaport, Katharine Rappaport, Dorothy Ann Rappaport, Stephen Rappaport, Luke Mitrani, Jack Mitrani, Liza Mitrani, Cindy Mitrani, Al Mitrani, Duke Sarnataro, Rosalie Sarnatoro, Traci Sarnataro, Dane Sarnataro, Frank Sarnataro, Dorothy Sarnataro, Jack Frederick, Kate Tubbs, John Gasper - Vocals on 10
