= Christylez Bacon =

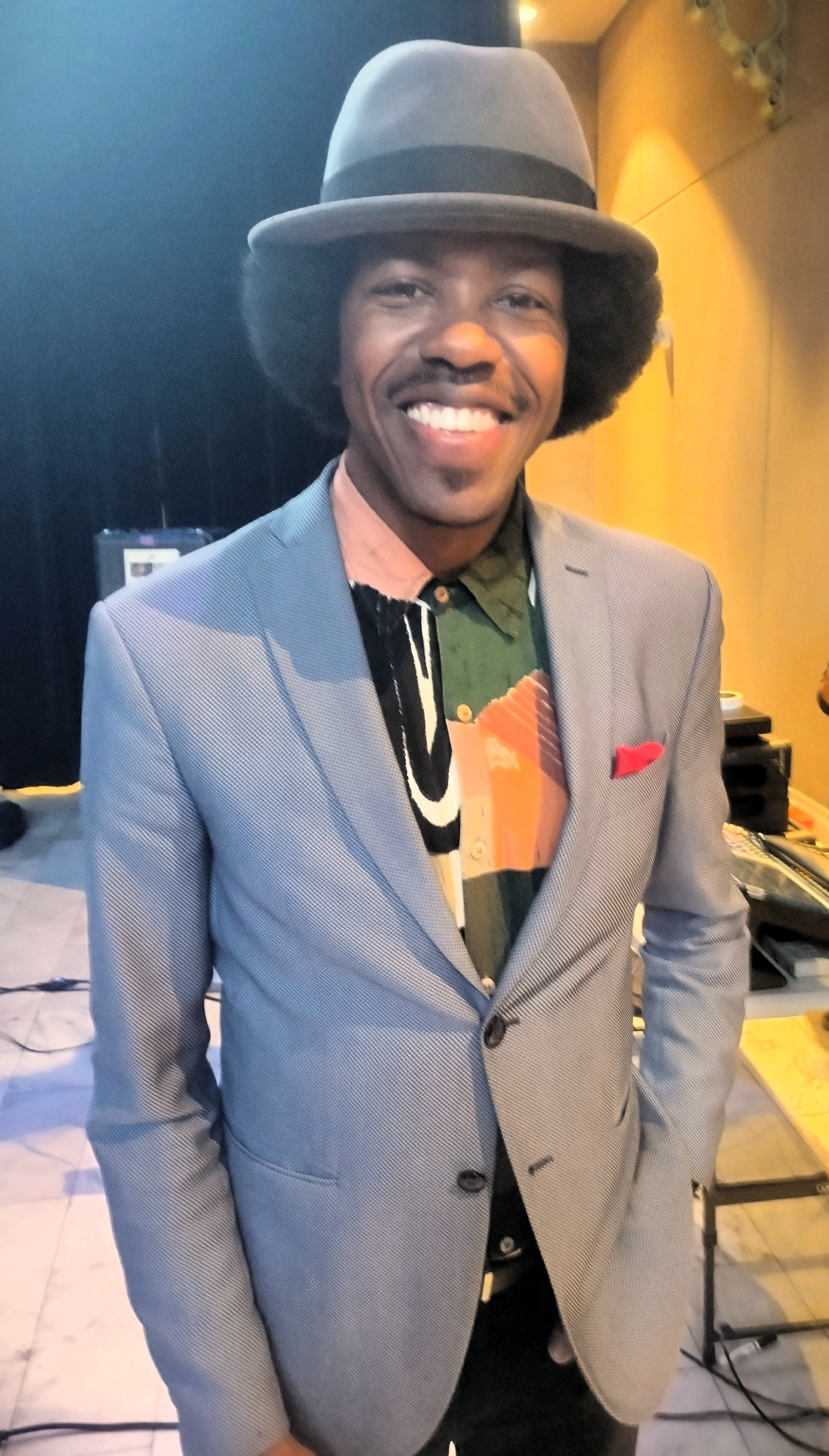
- Bacon in 2025

Background information
- Born: Christon Bacon; 5 March 1986 (age 40)
- Origin: Southeast, Washington, D.C.
- Genres: Progressive hip hop
- Occupations: Musician, Composer, Songwriter, Educator
- Instruments: Vocals, human-beatbox, Guitar, ukulele, Percussion
- Years active: 2004 - Present

Christylez Bacon (pronounced: Chris-Styles) (born March 5, 1986) is a hip hop music artist and multi-instrumentalist from Southeast Washington, Washington, D.C.

He was nominated for a Grammy in 2010 for Banjos to Beatbox, a children's album covering many different musical genres.

== Biography ==
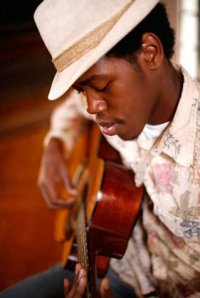
Bacon in 2008

Bacon was born and grew up in Washington, DC and attended the Duke Ellington School of the Arts in the city. He has been featured on Morning Edition, National Public Radio, performed at the John F. Kennedy Center for the Performing Arts and founded the Washington Sound Museum, a regular concert series at the Atlas Performing Arts center in Washington's H Street NE. The Washington Post notes that he is a beatboxer and progressive hip hop artist. He also played with the National Symphony Orchestra.

Bacon classifies his largely diverse music as progressive hip hop. In a local interview, He states,

"It takes traditional hip-hop elements and fuses live instrumentation and genres from around the world. The inspiration came from knowing our simple connection in music. Every culture or group of people on this planet has music and the arts. I have always believed that ignorance causes hate, disrespect, and lack of communication among us all. The idea of the "remix" in hip-hop music made it evident that we can put any style into the mix, thus uniting lovers of hip-hop, salsa, classical, jazz, and bhangra in one space. The music is the lure and the lyric is the education that will destroy the many barriers that prevent us from recognizing our connections with each other."

== Collaborations ==
=== 2008–2009 ===
- Triflava, Progressive Hip-Hop Band
- Urban Artistry, Hip-Hop Dance Collective
- Lily Neill, Celtic Harpist
- Rock N' Roll String Quartet, Classical/Rock String Quartet
- Cathy Fink & Marcy Marxer, 2x GRAMMY Winning Bluegrass/Children's Music Duo

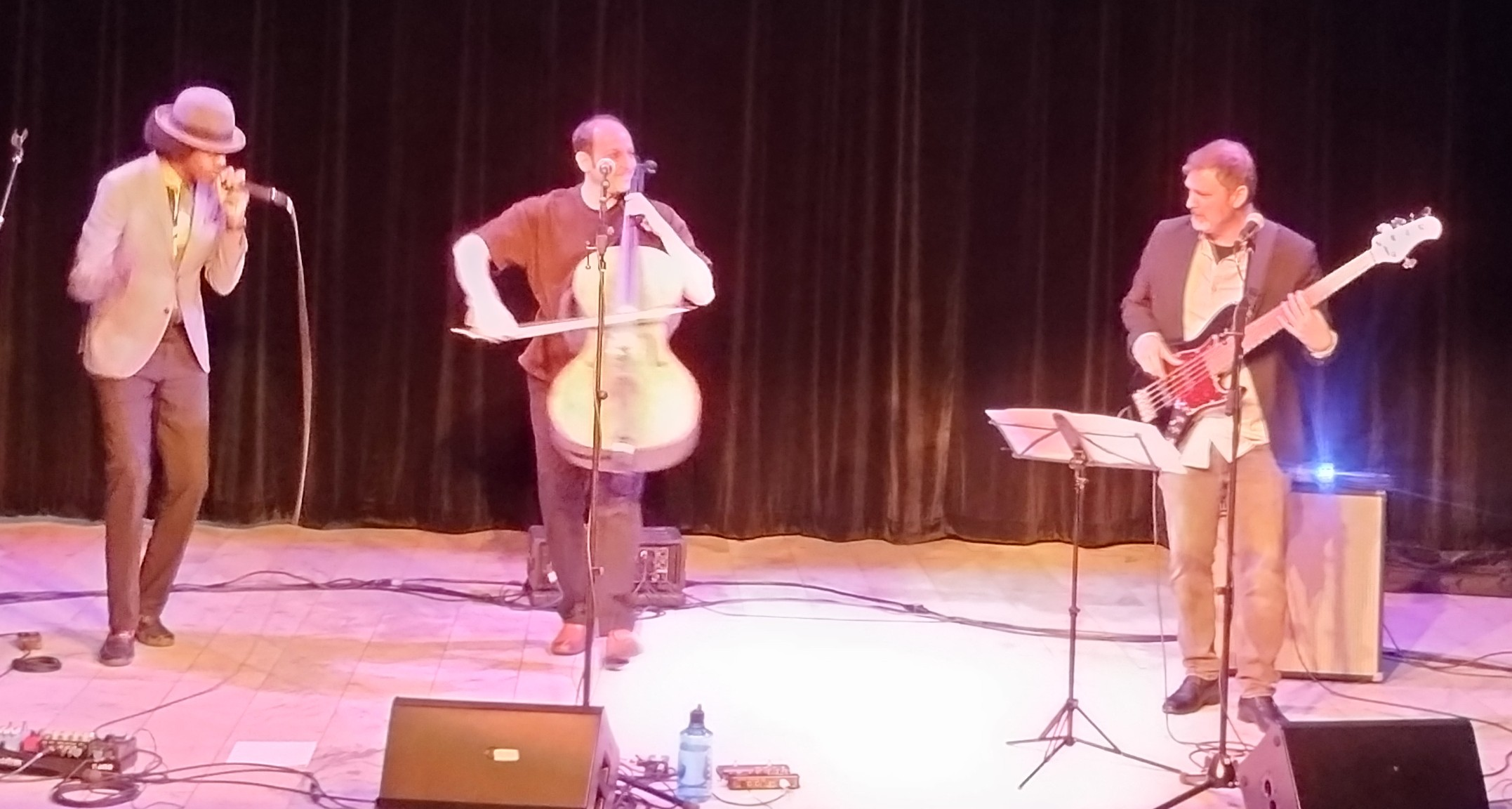
Biribá Union performing in 2025. Left to right: Christylez Bacon, Mike Block, Edward Perez.

== Discography ==
=== Advanced Artistry (2008–2009) ===
In an interview, Christylez explains the concept of this debut recording,

I called the album Advanced Artistry because it takes on traditional hip-hop elements and expands everything about it, with the use of piano solos in between the chorus & verses, heavy extended chord progressions, altered song structuring, and all original composition without sampling records. Being a student at Duke Ellington School of the Arts...I always saw these connections between sonata-allegro form and hip-hop song structure, scat & rapping. But hip-hop artists weren't doing that. That takes a true ear, music theory, and natural flava...I created this album out of a dream and a longing to hear the combination of cultures, genres, and social classes. I call it progressive hip-hop. It takes traditional hip-hop elements and fuses live instrumentation and genres from around the world...From there, my executive producer/friend/mentor, Bomani Armah, helped me sort through the collection, discarding the fluff. I worked exclusively with pianist, Mychael "Myke P" Pollard, in flushing out some of the arrangements...it's a musical journal of a kid in high school transitioning towards a short-term of college and a space in the 'real world'
