= Jaymay in Norway =

Studio album by Jaymay
- Released: November 1, 2014
- Genre: Folk rock Indie pop
- Label: Jaymay Music

Jaymay chronology
10UNDER2 EP (2012)	Jaymay in Norway (2014)	Enlighten Me (2015)

Jaymay in Norway is the 2014 album by American singer-songwriter Jaymay, recorded entirely at Spinner-Studio in Halden, Norway

== Track listing ==
All songs written by Jaymay.

1. "Orange Peels" - 3:41
2. "I Was Only Lovin' You" - 2:54
3. "Necklace I" - 1:11
4. "To Tell the Truth" - 4:01
5. "Letter" - 2:21
6. "Cassie's Song" - 3:34
7. "Necklace II" - 3:16
8. "Pins & Needles (feat. Vidar Busk)" - 2:47
9. "We Say Goodbye (Norway)" - 2:03

== Personnel ==
=== Musicians ===
- Jaymay - Musician and vocals
- Philip Mohn - Musician and vocals
- Tomas Pettersen - Musician
- Terje Støldal - Musician
- Vidar Busk - Musician and vocals
- Ole Amundsen - Musician and vocals
- Sverre Dæhli - Vocals
- Håvard Dahle - Vocals

=== Production ===
- Philip Mohn - Producer
- Tomas Pettersen - Co-Producer
- Philip Mohn - Mixing
- Tomas Pettersen - Mixing
- Sverre Dæhli - Mastering
- Geir Foshaug - Photography
