= Kiran Ahluwalia =

Indo-Canadian singer, composer (born 1965)

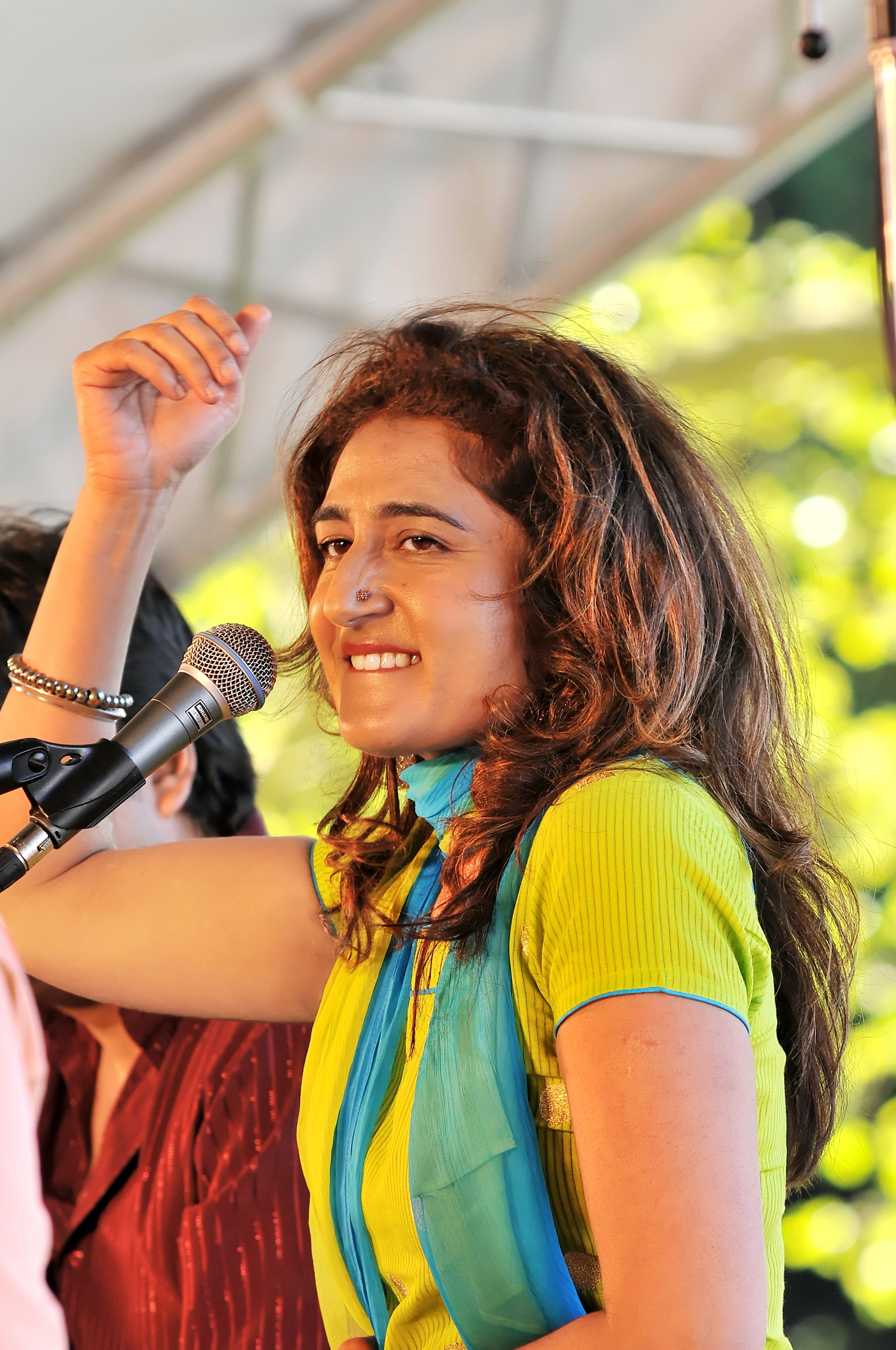
- Kiran Ahluwalia performing (2010)

Background information
- Born: 1 July 1965 (age 60); Patna, India
- Origin: Toronto, Canada
- Occupation(s): Singer and composer
- Years active: 2000–present
- Website: www.kiranmusic.com

Kiran Ahluwalia is a Canadian singer-songwriter who infuses Indian music with African desert blues and Western styles. Ahluwalia won the 'Newcomer' category in the inaugural Songlines Music Awards (2009) – announced 1 May 2009 – the new 'world music' awards organised by the UK-based magazine, Songlines.

== Personal life ==
Ahluwalia was born in Patna, grew up in Delhi and moved to Toronto at the age of nine. After completing her MBA at Dalhousie University, she returned to Toronto with the plan of being in the financial services industry, she changed her mind and went back to India to study music and then returned to Toronto to build her career as a musician.

Ahluwalia is married to guitar player and co-arranger Rez Abbasi, and currently lives in New York.

In 2016, Ahluwalia was one of the recipients of the Top 25 Canadian Immigrant Awards presented by Canadian Immigrant magazine.

== Discography ==
Title	Release	Record label	Awards
Kashish — Attraction	2000	Kiran Music	Nominated: 2002 Juno Award for Best Global Album
Beyond Boundaries	2003	Kiran Music	Won: 2004 Juno Award for World Music Album of the Year
Kiran Ahluwalia	2005	Triloka Records	
Wanderlust	2007	Four-Quarters Entertainment	Nominated: 2008 Juno Award for World Music Album of the Year
Wanderlust	2007	Four-Quarters Entertainment	winner of 2009 Songlines/WOMAD Best Newcomer Award
Aam Zameen – Common Ground	2011	Kiran Music (Canada), Avokado Artists Recordings (United States, Europe, Australia)	Won: 2011 Canadian Folk Music Award for Best World Solo Artist
Aam Zameen – Common Ground	2011	Kiran Music (Canada), Avokado Artists Recordings (United States, Europe, Australia)	Won: 2012 Juno Award for World Music Album of the Year
Sanata : Stillness	2014–15	ARC/Magenta	
7 Billion	2018	Six Degrees Records	
Comfort Food	2024	Kiran Music	

With Rez Abbasi

- Things to Come (Sunnyside, 2009)

Featured by Delerium

- Indoctrination (from Nuages du Monde) (Nettwerk, 2006)
