= Enlighten Me (album) =

Studio album by Jaymay
- Released: August 3, 2015
- Genre: Folk rock Indie pop
- Length: 31:15
- Label: Jaymay Music
- Producer: Jaymay and Josh Foote

Jaymay chronology
Jaymay in Norway (2014)	Enlighten Me (2015)	Jaymay Sings Christmas (2016)

Enlighten Me is the third full-length album by American singer-songwriter Jaymay, released in 2015. It was recorded in Los Angeles, California and at Snow God Studios in Brooklyn, New York.

"Never Weep" is adapted from and contains text from the poem entitled “For Una” by Robinson Jeffers.

"We Say Goodbye" is an alternate version of the recording from Jaymay in Norway (2014).

== Track listing ==
All songs written by Jaymay. 1. "I Stand Up for Me" - 3:28 2. "Baby Maybe One Day" - 2:36 3. "For Goodness Sake" - 1:53 4. "Never Weep" - 3:25 5. "Should Have Known" - 0:51 6. "Enlighten Me" - 7:07 7. "Singin' of the Birds" - 2:13 8. "There Are Red Roses" - 3:08 9. "Today & Tmoro" - 3:31 10. "Just Got Over You" - 2:12 11. "We Say Goodbye" - 0:51

== Personnel ==
=== Musicians ===
- Jaymay
- Jay Foote
- Alex Foote
- James McAlister
- Patrick MacDougall
- Karen Waltuch
- Aaron Dugan
- Nico Georis
- Mike Block
- Elmo Lovano

=== Production ===
- Jaymay - Producer, Engineer
- Jay Foote - Producer, Engineer
- Patrick MacDougall - Engineer, Mixing, Mastering
- Roc Morin - Photography
