= Panic On =

Studio album by Madder Rose
- Released: March 1994
- Recorded: Waterfront, Hoboken, NJ
- Genre: Alternative rock, indie pop
- Length: 51:05
- Label: Seed, Atlantic
- Producer: Madder Rose, Mark Freegard

Madder Rose chronology
Bring it Down (1993)	Panic On (1994)	Tragic Magic (1997)

Panic On is the second album by indie pop band Madder Rose, released in March 1994 on Atlantic Records.

== Recording ==
The album was recorded with, and co-produced by, Mark Freegard at Waterfront Studios in Hoboken, New Jersey. According to Madder Rose guitarist Billy Cote, the band recorded Panic On just after they had finished touring, and had only ten days to prepare for the recording sessions. He has also said that it was very easy to record the album's songs. After the album was recorded, the band's bassist, Matt Verta-Ray, left the band, whereupon they had five weeks to choose a new one; they settled on Chris Giammalvo from Eve's Plum.

== Critical reception ==
Professional ratings
Review scores
Source	Rating
AllMusic	4/5 stars
Christgau's Consumer Guide	(neither)
Entertainment Weekly	A–
Los Angeles Times	3/4 stars
Rolling Stone	4/5 stars
Spin	1/1 star

Among the many critics who reviewed Panic On favorably was Rolling Stone's Kara Manning, who wrote that it "beautifully blends poetry and mayhem" and gave it 4 out of 5 stars. Robert Christgau, however, was less complimentary, awarding the album a "neither", which, according to him, denotes an album that "may impress once or twice with consistent craft or an arresting track or two. Then it won't."

== Track listing ==
1. Sleep, Forever
2. Car Song
3. Panic On
4. What Holly Sees
5. Almost Lost My Mind
6. Drop a Bomb
7. Ultra Anxiety (Teenage Style)
8. Happy New Year
9. Day In, Day Out
10. Margaret
11. Foolish Ways
12. Black Eye Town
13. When You Smile
14. Mad Dog

== Personnel ==
- Dave Battelene—Assistant Engineer
- Diane Carpentieri—Design, Flute
- Billy Coté—Artwork, Composer, Cover Art, Guitar, Guitar (Rhythm), Slide Guitar, Vibraphone
- Greg Di Gesu—Assistant Engineer
- Mark Freegard—Engineer, Mini Moog, Mixing, Producer
- Ted Jensen—Mastering
- Johnny Kick—Artwork, Composer, Drums, Organ, Piano, Vibraphone, Vocals (Background)
- Rich Lamb—Assistant Engineer, Mixing Assistant
- Mary Lorson—Collage, Composer, Guitar, Organ, Piano, Vocals
- Madder Rose—Primary Artist, Producer
- Jeff Mauriello—Assistant Engineer
- Robert Musso—Engineer, Producer
- Tom Sheehan—Photography
- Matt Verta-Ray—Artwork, Bass, Composer, Cover Art, Guitar, Organ, Vibraphone, Violin, Vocals (Background)
- Steve Yegelwel—A&R
