= Surviving the Quiet =

Studio album by Seafood
- Released: January 2000
- Genre: Rock
- Length: 45:52
- Label: Fierce Panda
- Producer: Ian McCutcheon

Seafood chronology
Messenger in the Camp (1998)	Surviving the Quiet (2000)	When Do We Start Fighting... (2001)

Professional ratings
Review scores
Source	Rating
AllMusic	3/5 stars
The Encyclopedia of Popular Music	3/5 stars
Kerrang!	3/5 stars
NME	3.5/5 stars
Pitchfork Media	7.0/10
The Times	8/10

Surviving the Quiet is the debut album by the British band Seafood, following 1998's singles compilation Messenger in the Camp. The album was released in 2000.

== Critical reception ==
Kerrang! wrote: "'Folksong Crisis' is a sweet-and-sour sing-along that rides its hooks like Sonic Youth thrashing it out with Sleater-Kinney; and the more subdued numbers showcased a young band reaching a kind of creative maturity that’d feed into a very good follow-up, 2001’s When Do We Start Fighting..." The Times deemed it a "crackling bolt of sonic electricity." The Independent thought that the band's "repertoire sounds like a reprise of much of the best of the 1990s American alternative scene ... But the guys carry it off."

== Track listing ==
All songs written by Seafood.

1. "Guntrip" – 2:35
2. "Easy Path" – 3:12
3. "Belt" – 5:23
4. "Dear Leap The Ride" – 2:54
5. "This Is Not An Exit" – 3:43
6. "Led By Bison" – 4:29
7. "Toggle" – 6:02
8. "Beware Design" – 2:06
9. "Folksong Crisis" – 4:32
10. "fscII/The Quiet" – 10:51

== Personnel ==
- David Line – Vocals, guitars
- Charles Macleod – Guitars
- Kevin Hendrik – Bass, vocals
- Caroline Banks – Drums, vocals
- Melvin Duffy – Pedal steel guitar on "Dear Leap The Ride" and "Toggle"
- Sarah Measures – Flute on "Folksong Crisis" and "fscII/The Quiet"
- Leo – Cello on "Beware Design"
