= Hello June Fool =

Studio album by Madder Rose
- Released: 1999
- Label: Thirsty Ear
- Producer: Billy Coté

Madder Rose chronology
Tragic Magic (1997)	Hello June Fool (1999)	To Be Beautiful (2019)

Hello June Fool is an album by the American band Madder Rose, released in 1999. The album peaked at No. 41 on the UK Independent Albums Chart. Madder Rose supported it with UK and North American tours.

== Production ==
Lead guitarist Billy Coté wrote or cowrote the majority of the album's songs; he thought that many were about the oppressive rather than enjoyable aspects of summer. The sound of Hello June Fool was influenced by trip hop, with "Train" incorporating the style of dub reggae.

== Critical reception ==
Professional ratings
Review scores
Source	Rating
AllMusic	4/5 stars
Daily Mail	2/5 stars
The Independent	2/5 stars
NME	8/10
Pitchfork	7.1/10
The Times	6/10
The Virgin Encyclopedia of Nineties Music	3/5 stars

Pitchfork noted that "the warm narcotic haze of the guitars envelops you like an old blanket, but Mary Lorson's vocals, still cold as ice-nine, keep you from passing out completely." The Daily Mail determined that "the hypnotic hooks of their debut album, Bring It Down, are missing." NME said that "Madder Rose have liberated the breezy beauty that has long bubbled under their smokiest torch songs."

The Guardian opined that "Lorson's voice has made the transition from otherworldly to bored." The Independent wrote that "it's a rambling whole and Mary Lorson's vocals lack their usual conviction." Newsday said that "Madder Rose resonates like an amalgam of the worst Mazzy Star-Cowboy Junkies pap imaginable." The Chicago Tribune noted that the "songs don't rock so much as they shimmer with a warm, end-of-summer psychedelia."

AllMusic concluded that "there's a definite air of wistful, smoky mystery throughout Hello June Fool, almost suggesting the touch of such acts as Portishead and Massive Attack."

== Track listing ==
No.	Title	Length
1.	"Feels Like Summer"
2.	"Overflow"
3.	"Hotel"
4.	"Fade"
5.	"Goodbye June Fool"
6.	"Something"
7.	"You Remember"
8.	"Should Have Known"
9.	"Talking to Myself"
10.	"Train"
11.	"Dark Rain"
