= Paper Crown King =

Studio album by Seafood
- Released: 4 September 2006
- Recorded: Neat Science Studios, London, September 2005 - February 2006
- Genre: Rock
- Length: 45:51
- Label: Cooking Vinyl
- Producer: Kevin Peney and David Line; Mixed by Eli Janney

Seafood chronology
As the Cry Flows (2004)	Paper Crown King (2006)

Professional ratings
Review scores
Source	Rating
AllMusic	3.5/5 stars

Paper Crown King is the fourth and final album by British band Seafood, released on 4 September 2006 in the United Kingdom and 13 February 2007 in North America.

== Track listing ==
All songs written by Seafood.

1. "I Will Talk" – 4:31
2. "Signal Sparks" – 4:52
3. "Between the Noise Pt.2" – 4:22
4. "Time & Tides" – 4:53
5. "Last Outpost" – 5:49
6. "Awkward Ghost" – 4:28
7. "Disappear" – 5:05
8. "Little Pieces" – 3:03
9. "Paper Crown King" – 5:17
10. "How You Gonna Live Without Me?" – 3:23

== Personnel ==
- David Line - Vocals, guitars
- Kevin Penney - Guitars
- Kevin Hendrick - Bass, vocals
- Caroline Banks - Drums
- Peter Back - Saxophone on "How You Gonna Live Without Me?"
