= Jaymay =

American singer-songwriter from New York (born 1981)

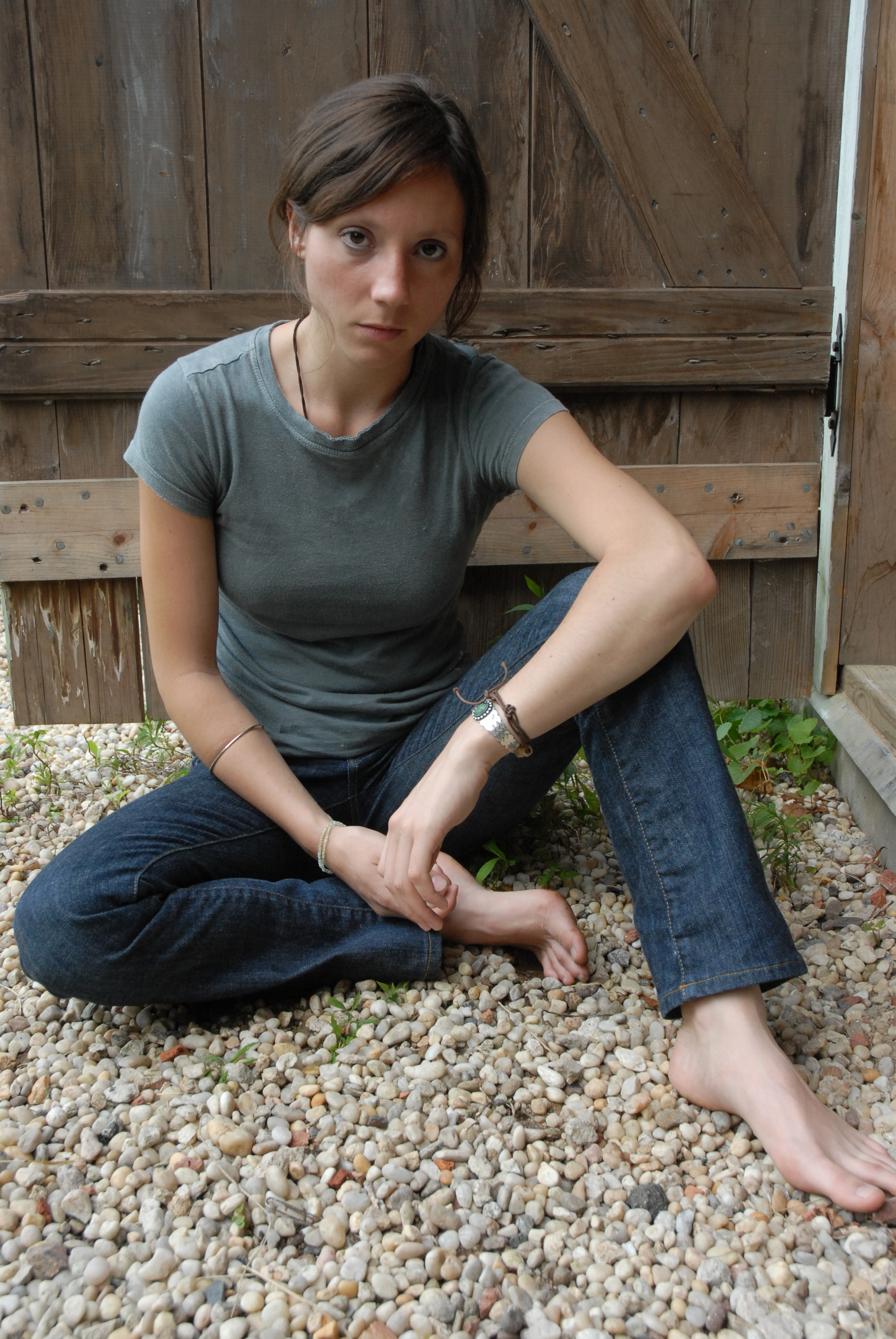

Background information
- Born: Jamie Kristine Seerman; January 3, 1981 (age 45); New York City, United States
- Genres: Singer/Songwriter; Contemporary folk music Indie pop
- Instruments: Vocals, Guitar, Piano, Violin, Typewriter, xylophone
- Labels: Jaymay Music; Heavenly Recordings; Blue Note Records
- Website: jaymaymusic.com

Jamie Seerman is an American singer-songwriter from New York. She performs under the name Jaymay.

== Early life ==
Jaymay was born Jamie Seerman on January 3, 1981, and was raised on Long Island. For undergrad, she studied at New College of Florida, Columbia University and Hunter College in New York City, as well as Lorenzo de' Medici in Florence, Italy. After graduating from New College in 2003, she moved to NYC, where she began regularly performing at the SideWalk Cafe's open mic night every Monday night.

== Career ==
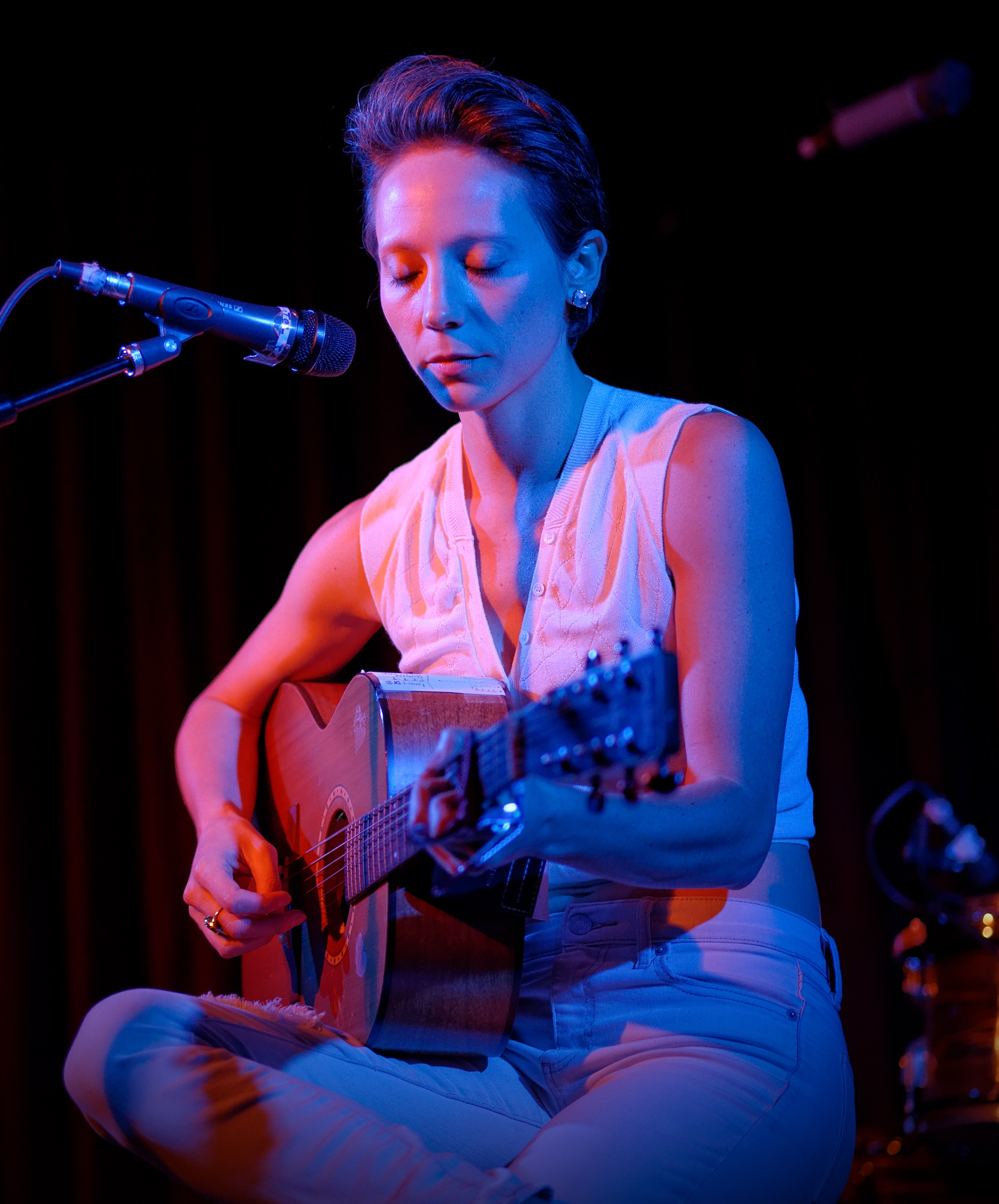
Jaymay in 2015

Jaymay has played live concerts supporting Bright Eyes, Bon Iver, Beirut, Teddy Thompson, A.A. Bondy, Deer Tick, Isobel Campbell & Mark Lanegan, Jose Gonzales, Okkervil River, Kevin Devine, Hayden, Tift Merritt, Cherry Ghost, Caribou, Elvis Perkins, Nouvelle Vague, The Bird and the Bee, Jens Lekman, Goldfrapp, and others, and has played festivals such as Glastonbury, Latitude, Edinburgh Fringe, Belladrum Tartan Heart Festival, Hillside and more.

The song "Sea Green, See Blue" was featured in the Season 2 finale of CBS's How I Met Your Mother, which aired May 14, 2007.

Jaymay wrote and provided songs and the score to the 2010 film Happythankyoumoreplease at the insistence of writer/director/star Josh Radnor, a longtime fan of Jaymay. "Never Be Daunted" from the film was shortlisted for the Academy of Motion Pictures Arts & Sciences' Best Original Song Academy Award.

Jaymay provided vocals for the cover of the Kinks' "Big Sky" on ''Orchestral Variations V.01'' by The Separate, which was the final album released by Setanta Records in 2012.

In November 2013, Jaymay flew to Keithville, Louisiana to play at the bedside of Lexi Gordon, a 2-year old fan diagnosed with the terminal neurological disease Tay–Sachs disease, after the family made the wish to Pay It Forward Networking to reach out to Lexi's favorite performer.

The live version of "You Are The Only One I Love" from the Lvng Rm EP was featured in Facebook's national Mother's Day TV and internet commercial in 2014 and 2015 in the United States.

In August 2014, a musical based on the album Autumn Fallin' was produced at the Edinburgh Fringe Festival by Anton Benson Productions.

Jaymay's cover recordings of "A Tombstone Every Mile" and "Dream a Little Dream of Me" were featured in the 2014 film Stephen King's A Good Marriage.

Jaymay has made television appearances performing on "Late Night with Conan O'Brien", "The Late Late Show with Craig Ferguson" and "Colour Room" in 2008, and "Good Morning" in Romania in 2014.

In 2015, Jaymay's song, "If You Take My Window", was recorded by musician & activist, Wynn Walent, and released as part of an album to raise money for the St. Luke Foundation for Haiti. Jaymay's original recording of the song appears on her 1 & ! EP.

She has been described by the BBC as being the "darling of the New York 'Anti-Folk' scene", and by the New York Times as a "big name...for the indie universe".

On June 1, 2016, Jaymay announced online that she would be releasing a new album, To Tell the Truth, in conjunction with a PledgeMusic campaign.

In 2021, Jaymay was reported to be appearing on the podcast Storybound.

=== Collaborations ===
Jaymay has collaborated with Kevin Devine on the songs "Brother's Blood", "Time to Burn" and "Murphy's Song", with Cheyenne on "Write It Down in Red", and with Dirty on Purpose on "Light Pollution" and "Like Bees".

Jaymay provided guest vocals on art-metal band Goes Cube's second full-length studio album, In Tides and Drifts. She is also featured on the My Cousin, The Emperor's songs "Burly, Old Couch" and "Somedays" from The Subway EPs, Vol. I: Prospect Park West, released March 29, 2011.

Jaymay collaborated with K'Naan and was a vocalist on his 2012 EP More Beautiful Than Silence.

== Discography ==
=== Albums ===
- 2007: Autumn Fallin'
- 2014: Jaymay in Norway
- 2015: Enlighten Me
- 2016: To Tell the Truth
- 2016: Fallin' Like Snow

=== EPs ===
- 2006: Sea Green, See Blue.
- 2010: Lvng Rm EP
- 2010: Long Walk to Never
- 2012: 10UNDER2
- 2016: 1 & !
- 2016: Song for Paul
- 2016: Demon Love
- 2016: Not Your Fault
- 2016: Evil People
- 2016: Over My Head
- 2016: Orange Peels

=== Compilation appearances ===
- 2014: "You Are the Only One I Love (piano demo)", Friends (Fadeaway Records)
- 2015: "Pretty Girls Make Graves", Tease Torment Tantalize: A 30th Anniversary Tribute to the Smiths' Debut (Reimagine Music)
