= Messenger in the Camp =

Studio album by Seafood
- Released: November 1998
- Genre: Rock
- Length: 44:31
- Label: Fierce Panda
- Producer: Seafood

Seafood chronology
Messenger in the Camp (1998)	Surviving the Quiet (2000)

Professional ratings
Review scores
Source	Rating
AllMusic	4/5 stars

Messenger in the Camp is a mini-album by British band Seafood. Released in 1998, the album collects together the band's first three singles, their accompanying b-sides and two radio session tracks recorded in the Xfm London station studios.

== Track listing ==
All songs written by Seafood.

1. "Scorch Comfort" – 4:01
2. "Psychic Rainy Nights" – 5:22
3. "Porchlight" – 4:33
4. "Ukiah" – 3:07
5. "Rot Of The Stars (Xfm session)" – 4:00
6. "Dope Slax (Xfm session)" – 4:48
7. "We Felt Maroon" – 2:58
8. "Dig" – 6:16

== Personnel ==
- David Line - Vocals, guitars
- Charles MacLeod - Guitars
- Kevin Hendrick - Bass, vocals
- Caroline Banks - Drums, vocals
