= Another Day Has Passed =

Studio album by Goes Cube
- Released: May 12, 2009
- Genre: Hard rock
- Length: 45:04
- Label: The End
- Producer: Dean Baltulonis

Professional ratings
Review scores
Source	Rating
Allmusic	3.5/5 stars
Blistering	8/10 stars
Blogcritics	positive
Decibel	9/10 stars
Revolver	3/4 stars
Rhapsody	

Another Day Has Passed is the debut studio album by American hard rock–heavy metal band Goes Cube. It was released May 12, 2009 on The End Records.

== Music ==
On Another Day Has Passed, Goes Cube fuses hard rock and heavy metal in what one critic described as "an onslaught of loud, buzzing guitars inspired by the metallic side of noise-rock and the artsy side of post-hardcore."

== Critical reception ==
Another Day Has Passed was well received by critics. Brent Burton of Revolver called the album "a-tight-and upbeat brand of metal that aims straight at the heart of the mainstream—and mostly hits strikes." The album also received positive reviews from Allmusic, Blistering magazine, Blogcritics, and Decibel.

== Track listing ==
1. "Bluest Sky" – 1:56
2. "Grinding the Knife Blade" – 3:15
3. "Restore" – 3:20
4. "The Only Daughter" – 2:58
5. "I Hold Grudges" – 2:20
6. "Saab Sonnet" – 4:05
7. "Goes Cube Song 30" – 3:12
8. "Back to Basics" – 2:31
9. "Goes Cube Song 57" – 2:16
10. "Urbana-Champaign" – 4:56
11. "Clenching Jaws" – 2:47
12. "Victory" – 3:14
13. "Another Day Has Passed" – 8:09

== Personnel ==
- Kenny Appell – drums
- Matthew Frey – bass, backing vocals
- David Obuchowski – guitar, vocals
- Dean Baltulonis – production
- Dave Gardner – mastering
- Joseph Yoon – executive producer
