= Saint Low =

- Also known as: Mary Lorson & Saint Low
- Origin: Newfield, New York, U.S.
- Genres: Jazz, funk, pop
- Years active: 2000–present
- Labels: Cooking Vinyl; LoveCat Music
- Members: Mary Lorson; Stahl Caso; Zaun Marshburn; Joe Myer; Michael Stark; Jennie Stearns
- Website: Saint Low on MySpace

Saint Low is a band and vehicle for singer-songwriter Mary Lorson, formerly of Madder Rose. Lorson formed the band in 2000, after taking a break from Madder Rose three years earlier.

In Madder Rose, Lorson sang lead vocals, but guitar player Billy Coté wrote the majority of songs on each album, leaving Lorson with a backlog of her own songs. After Madder Rose released its last album, Hello June Fool, in 1999, Lorson formed Saint Low to release that material. The band's second and third albums have been released under the moniker "Mary Lorson & Saint Low" due to confusion among fans, some of whom misinterpreted Saint Low as an alter-ego for Lorson, rather than a band name.

Although Saint Low is an American band and released in the US on LoveCat Music; in UK, its albums are released on Cooking Vinyl.

== Discography ==
- "Keep An Open Mind/Anywhere", 1998 (single)
- "On The Outside", 2000 (single)
- Saint Low, 2000
- Tricks for Dawn, 2002 (as Mary Lorson & Saint Low)
- Realistic, 2005 (as Mary Lorson & Saint Low)
