= Junior Cottonmouth =

English pop rock band

Junior Cottonmouth (stylized as ju.nior cottonmouth), also known as Cottonmouth or Cotto, was a pop rock quartet from Lancaster, England. They released one album, Bespoke, on Atlantic Records in 1997. This album was mostly produced by Craig Leon.

== Reception ==
Bespoke received mixed reviews from critics. Mark Jenkins wrote in the Washington Post that the album "features bouncy melodies, pithy guitar solos and catchy refrains," while also adding, "Few of those refrains, however, are indelible." Similarly, Steven Mirkin wrote in Entertainment Weekly that the album was "Pleasant, off-the-rack Britpop" and gave it a C+ grade. Robert Christgau gave the album a "choice cut" grade, which corresponds to an album he thinks is mostly bad but that has a few good songs on it. He identified these songs as "Physical Stuff" and "Something Scratching". A review in Billboard described the album's single, "Something Scratching," as "the closest thing to a perfect pop record you are likely to hear at the moment."
