= Ian McCutcheon =

American neurosurgeon

- Born: 1959 (age 66–67); London, Ontario, Canada
- Education: Yale University; McGill University Faculty of Medicine; Montreal Neurological Institute
- Occupation: Neurosurgeon
- Children: 2

== Ian E. McCutcheon ==
Ian E. McCutcheon (born 1959), is a Canadian-American neurosurgeon, academic, and clinical leader in the field of neuro-oncology. He is currently a Professor of Neurosurgery at the University of Texas MD Anderson Cancer Center, where he holds the Anne C. Brooks & Anthony D. Bullock III Distinguished Chair in Neurosurgery. He is recognized for his work on pituitary tumors, neuroendocrine disorders, and the surgical management of complex brain and nerve sheath tumors.

=== Early life and education ===
McCutcheon entered Yale University at age 16 and earned a Bachelor of Arts in Chemistry in 1978. Following the passing of his father during his freshman year, he accelerated his studies to graduate in three years. He then attended McGill University Faculty of Medicine, earning his M.D. in 1984. He completed his general surgery internship at Cedars-Sinai Medical Center in Los Angeles. He then trained in neurosurgery at the Montreal Neurological Institute and Montreal General Hospital, followed by a clinical research fellowship at the National Institutes of Health.

=== Career ===
McCutcheon joined the Department of Neurosurgery at MD Anderson Cancer Center in 1991. Over the next three decades, he built and led one of the country's foremost pituitary tumor programs, treating over 100 patients annually. He also serves as the primary neurosurgeon for institutional programs related to von Hippel–Lindau disease, neurofibromatosis type 1 and 2, and malignant peripheral nerve sheath tumors.

As Director of the Neuroendocrine Program, McCutcheon pioneered multidisciplinary care models that include endocrinologists, radiation oncologists, and neuropathologists. His contributions have advanced surgical standards and clinical outcomes for patients with complex skull base and pituitary lesions.

=== Research and publications ===
McCutcheon has authored over 125 peer-reviewed publications and 25 book chapters. His research focuses on meningiomas, PitNETs (pituitary neuroendocrine tumors), brain metastases, and MPNSTs. He has contributed to the refinement of pituitary tumor classification through work on multilineage PitNETs co-expressing PIT1 and SF1. His clinical trials include studies on stereotactic radiosurgery, outcomes of pituitary carcinomas, and imaging modalities for brain tumors.

McCutcheon's work is indexed in major scientific databases including PubMed, and his institutional contributions are cataloged in Elsevier Pure and ResearchGate. His translational research has influenced updates to WHO tumor classifications and informed therapeutic strategies for rare CNS tumors.

=== Honors and affiliations ===
McCutcheon is a fellow of the Royal College of Surgeons of Canada (FRCS(C)) and the American College of Surgeons (FACS). He has served in the United States Navy Reserve.

He has held leadership roles in multiple professional societies:

- President, Pituitary Network Association
- President, Society of University Neurosurgeons
- President, Texas Association of Neurological Surgeons
- President, Houston Neurological Society

He has served as a visiting professor at over 30 academic institutions internationally and is a frequent presenter at national and international conferences.

McCutcheon is also a member of editorial boards for:

- Journal of Neuro-Oncology
- Neuro-Oncology
- World Neurosurgery

=== Selected awards ===
- Anne C. Brooks & Anthony D. Bullock III Distinguished Chair in Neurosurgery, MD Anderson Cancer Center (2022–Present)
- Ashbel Smith Professorship, MD Anderson Cancer Center (2017–2021)
- Ronald L. Bittner Award for Brain Tumor Research (2012)
- National Brain Tumor Society Mahaley Award (2012)

=== Selected publications ===
- Faraj C.A., et al. \"A case of a (not so) diffuse leptomeningeal glioneuronal tumor.\" J. Neuropathol. Exp. Neurol. (2025).
- Dasgupta P., et al. \"A massive thoracic meningocele in NF1.\" Can. J. Neurol. Sci. (2025).
- McCutcheon I.E., et al. \"Pituitary carcinoma: The University of Texas MD Anderson Cancer Center Experience.\" J. Clin. Endocrinol. Metab. (2018).

=== Personal life ===
McCutcheon is known for his love of books stamp collecting, and travel. He is known by students and peers for his intellect, humility, and dry wit.
