= Nick Zala =

Nick Zala (born 21 January 1959), is an English pedal steel and guitar player from Barnet, Hertfordshire, England.

== Early life ==
Born Nicholas Michael Anthony Zala, he was exposed to music from a very young age. His grandparents were both skilled pianists – one a sight reader, and the other a jazz musician who played entirely by ear. He took up the cello at the age of seven but gave it up only two years later in favour of the more portable guitar. By the age of 15, he had received jazz guitar tuition from Ike Isaacs and some useful advice in a one-to-one with Joe Pass.

== Career ==
After 30 years as a professional guitar-player and teacher, Zala took up the pedal steel guitar. His first band, The Loose Salute, contacted him eight weeks after he had bought his pedal steel. A positive review of his first gig with The Loose Salute appeared in The Guardian, boosting his career. Between 2003 and 2007, he recorded on eleven albums, toured in Europe and the United States, appeared on television and radio, and made it into the top ten of the UK Albums Chart, with pop band McFly's platinum-selling album Motion in the Ocean.

Numerous albums have subsequently followed, both in the retail and production music areas, and likewise many sessions, both on guitar, pedal steel and other instruments, including banjo, mandolin, ukulele and harmonica.

His latest title Jazz Guitar described by him as "a homage to Ike (Isaacs), and Joe (Pass), and a fresh look at the genre".

In 2012, Zala played guitar and pedal steel in "Acetones" with Alan Darby (guitar), Jim Watson (keyboards), and Jonathan Noyce (bass).

Zala has been working with composer Chris Bangs on the feature film, Highly Functional set for U.S. release in September 2016 (pedal steel, guitar, mandolin).

== Discography ==
- 2003 – Seafood – As The Cry Flows
- 2004 – The General Store – Mountain Rescue
- 2004 – Frankie Miller – Long Way Home
- 2005 – The Loose Salute – Suck It Up Buttercup
- 2006 – Mojave Three – Puzzles Like You
- 2006 – McFly – Motion in the Ocean
- 2006 – Songs From The Blue House – Tree
- 2007 – Jessica Blake – Three Good Reason
- 2007 – Matt Willis – Crash
- 2007 – The Loose Salute – Tuned To Love
- 2007 – Virginia Younger – Fall in Love Again
- 2010 – Bottleneck Banjo (Library/Production)
- 2010 – Light Country Ballads (Library/Production)
- 2010 – Light Country Ballads Volume 2 (Library/Production)
- 2010 - Pedal Steel Themes and Beds (Library/Production)
- 2010 – Pedal Steel Themes and Beds Volume 2 (Library/Production)
- 2011 – Classical Guitar Concertos
- 2011 – Classical Guitar Concertos Volume 2
- 2011 - Pedal Steel Heaven
- 2011 – Pedal Steel Heaven Volume 2
- 2011 – The Ultimate Folk Collection
- 2011 – The Ultimate Folk Collection Volume 2
- 2011 – The Ultimate Folk Collection Volume 3
- 2011 – The Ultimate Folk Collection Volume 4
- 2011 – Classical Guitar Masterpieces
- 2011 – Classical Guitar Masterpieces Volume 2
- 2011 – The Platinum Country Collection
- 2011 – The Platinum Country Collection Volume 2
- 2011 – The Platinum Country Collection Volume 3
- 2011 – The Platinum Country Collection Volume 4
- 2011 - American Anthems
- 2011 - American Anthems Volume 2
- 2011 - Ultimate Love Songs Collection
- 2011 - Ultimate Love Songs Collection Volume 2
- 2011 – The Hank Williams Songbook
- 2011 – Bluegrass Greats
- 2011 – Music of Love
- 2011 – Music of Love Volume 2
- 2011 – Music of Love Volume 3
- 2011 – Strictly Swing
- 2011 - Strictly Ballroom Swing
- 2012 – Absolute Guitar
- 2012 – Romantic Guitar Collection
- 2012 – Romantic Guitar Collection Volume 2
- 2012 – Country Classics
- 2012 - Light Jazz Guitar Themes and Beds (Library/Production)
- 2012 – Light Jazz Guitar Themes and Beds Volume 2 (Library/Production)
- 2012 – Absolute Love
- 2012 - 40 Folk Classics
- 2012 – Songs From The Blue House – IV
- 2012 - Songs From the Blue House – You’re So Vain
- 2013 – Peter Sanford – Help For Heroes
- 2013 - Jazz Guitar
