= Bill Wadman =

American portrait photographer (born 1975)

- Born: January 4, 1975 (age 51)
- Occupation: Photographer
- Website: www.billwadman.com

William George Wadman (born January 4, 1975) is an American portrait photographer. He has been a contributor to Time, BusinessWeek, Improper Bostonian, POZ, and others. His images have been featured worldwide in Le Monde, Der Spiegel, Times of London, USA Today, The New York Times, and Corriere della Sera. His work tends towards traditional portraiture in both environmental and studio settings. He shoots in all formats and in both film and digital. Bill was also the co-host of the On Taking Pictures podcast on the 5by5 Studios network of shows.

== Before photography ==
Wadman grew up in suburban Connecticut, attended the University of Connecticut for two years before earning a bachelor's degree in music from Berklee College in Boston. He spent the next decade working as a freelance art director for major brands including Colgate, Sprint, Phillip Morris, Royal Caribbean, Clairol, RCA, and Xerox. After almost a decade in advertising, Wadman turned his attention to photography.

== Work ==
=== 365 Portraits ===
Over the course of 2007, Wadman created his "365 Portraits" project wherein he took a portraits of 365 different people, one a day, posting them as a daily blog. Over the course of the year he traveled from his native New York to London, San Francisco, Yosemite National Park, Los Angeles, and Washington DC to collect his images. According to interviews, his subjects were largely volunteers who followed the project. Unlike most projects of the type, the portraits were all different and were taken on location and in the studio in 35mm digital, medium format film, or 4x5 Polaroid.

On June 23, 2007, 365portraits.com was chosen as Yahoo! site of the day and earned press coverage from USA Today and The Times of London.

At its peak, 365portraits.com had approximately 20,000 visitors per day and has been widely imitated. His subjects included Apollo astronaut Buzz Aldrin, politico Tucker Carlson, Grammy award-winning singer-songwriter Imogen Heap, essayist Geoff Dyer, Lord Bath, humanitarian Terry Waite, photographer Timothy Greenfield-Sanders, TV personality Mo Rocca, historian James Burke, adult film star Nicole Sheridan, activist Chelsea Sexton, and physicist Brian Greene.

A limited-edition book was released which contained all 365 portraits. The project was also presented at April 2010 meeting of Photographic Arts & Imaging at the Arts Club in New York City.

=== Drabbles ===
In late 2009, Wadman started his Drabbles series; a collection of 46 wide-angle landscape portraits. A departure from his earlier, more intimate work, Drabbles were a voyeuristic look into more scripted image often with the subject playing a role.

A selection of 20 large prints from Drabbles were featured in a solo show at the SoHo Photo Gallery in September 2010. A video of The Making of Drabbles lecture was given at the gallery and can be found online at YouTube and Vimeo.

=== Current projects ===
Wadman is currently working on multiple personal projects.

"Motion" is a series of long exposure studies of human motion shot in the studio. It was featured on the Huffington Post and Petapixel.com.

"Panels" is a collection of multi-photographic works laid out as a page from a graphic novel. Each contains the story of a stereotypical dream. Flying, teeth falling out, chased in the woods, unprepared test, etc.

Starting in mid-2014 the "Corner Project" started out as a DIY project to make it easier to take pictures of people without dealing with the hassle of coordinating people and locations. Wadman turned a corner of his apartment into a textured background to take portraits against. The resulting series of portraits garnering interest from the online photographic community and he was interviewed by several notable photography blogs.

=== On Taking Pictures podcast ===
The On Taking Pictures podcast, about the more cerebral parts of photography and art creation, was hosted by Bill and Jeffery Saddoris; they talked weekly. As of November 2021, the most recent podcast was number 326 dated October 30, 2018.

=== Other work ===
Wadman's portrait of Malcolm Gladwell was requested to be in "About Face", a show of famous Ontarians by the lieutenant governor of Ontario.

Wadman is also featured in the Adobe Press book Photoshop: Masterclass.

CreativeMornings used Wadman as the artist for their "Failure" theme, which was deconstructed by Wadman on his blog.
