= Rez Abbasi =

Pakistan-born American jazz musician

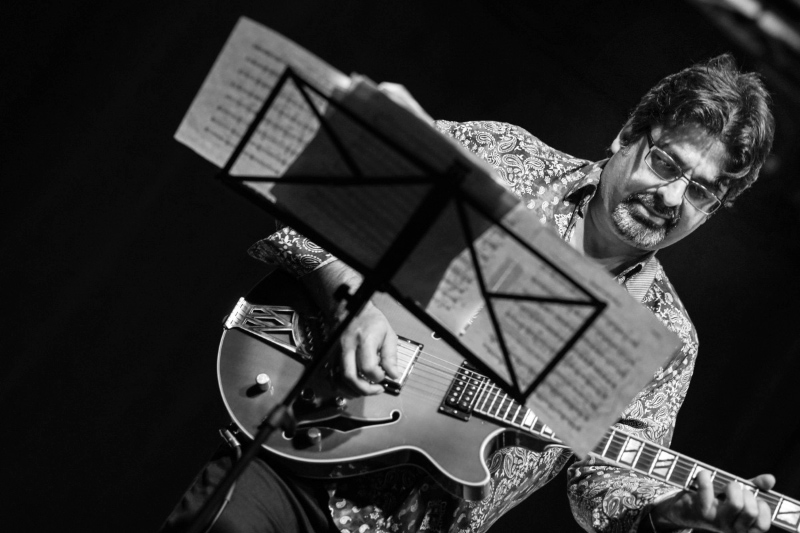

Background information
- Born: August 27, 1965; Karachi, Pakistan
- Genres: Jazz, jazz fusion, Indian classical
- Occupations: Musician, composer, producer
- Instrument: Guitar
- Years active: 1990–present
- Labels: Sunnyside, Enja, Cuneiform
- Spouse: Kiran Ahluwalia
- Website: www.reztone.com

Rez Abbasi (born August 27, 1965) is a Pakistan-born American jazz guitarist, composer, and record producer based in New York City.

== Biography ==
Abbasi was born in Karachi, Pakistan. When he was four, his family moved to Los Angeles, and at eleven he started learning guitar. He spent his early teens playing in rock bands. Inspired at a concert featuring vocalist Ella Fitzgerald and guitarist Joe Pass, he began to pursue jazz and classical music.

Abbasi studied guitar at the University of Southern California and at the Manhattan School of Music. After graduating in 1989, he spent a couple months in India studying tabla with Alla Rakha, which kindled an interest in the music of India and Pakistan.

He traveled to India to study under master tabla player Ustad Alla Rakha, to develop an east–west fusion style. However, as he told Guitar Player magazine, "I’ve never studied the sitar or the sarod because to really learn to play either of them I would have had to give up everything else. So, I learned some of the techniques on what you might call a jazz street level. ... [I] have been influenced by rock and roll and jazz and other music since I was a kid."

He has been a member of the Indo-Pak Coalition and Dakshani, two groups led by saxophonist Rudresh Mahanthappa, and has played and arranged for his wife and singer Kiran Ahluwalia. He has also worked with Billy Hart, D. D. Jackson, Dave Liebman, Dave Pietro, Gary Thomas, Gary Versace, Kenny Werner, Marvin Smith, Rick Margitza, Sunny Jain, Tim Hagans, and Tony Malaby.

== Discography ==
=== As leader ===
- Rez Abbasi (Self-released, 1993)
- Third Ear (Cathexis, 1995)
- Modern Memory (Cathexis, 1998)
- Out of Body (String Jazz, 2002)
- Snake Charmer (Earth Sounds, 2005)
- Bazaar (Zoho, 2006)
- Things to Come (Sunnyside, 2009)
- Natural Selection (Sunnyside, 2010)
- Suno Suno (Enja, 2011)
- Continuous Beat (Enja, 2012)
- Intents and Purposes (Enja, 2015)
- Behind the Vibration (Cuneiform, 2016)
- Unfiltered Universe (Whirlwind, 2017)
- A Throw of Dice (Whirlwind, 2019)
- Django-Shift (Whirlwind, 2020)
- Oasis with Isabelle Oliver (Enja, 2020)
- Charm (Whirlwind, 2023)

=== As guest ===
- Kiran Ahluwalia, Aam Zameen: Common Ground (Self-released 2011)
- Kiran Ahluwalia, Wanderlust (World Connection, 2007)
- Mike Clark, Carnival of Soul (Owl Studios, 2010)
- Sunny Jain, Mango Festival (Zoho, 2004)
- Rudresh Mahanthappa, Kinsmen (Pi, 2008)
- Rudresh Mahanthappa, Apti (Innova, 2008)
- Dave Pietro, The Chakra Suite (Challenge, 2008)
- Adam Rudolph, Turning Towards the Light (Cuneiform, 2015)

== Sources ==
- Bielefeld Catalogue, 1988 & 2002
- Richard Cook and Brian Morton: The Penguin Guide to Jazz Recordings, 8th Edition, London, Penguin, 2006, ISBN 0-141-02327-9
- Official site
