= Jane Wooster Scott =

American painter

Jane Wooster Scott is an American painter, who was named by Guinness Book of World Records as the most reproduced artist in America. She started painting at the age of 35 and has never had a lesson. Her works hang on permanent display at the American embassies in Portugal and Australia, and have hung at the US White House. She has sold works to Carol Burnett, Charlton Heston, Paul Newman, Arnold Schwarzenegger, Nancy Sinatra, Sylvester Stallone and many others.
