= Goes Cube =

American rock band

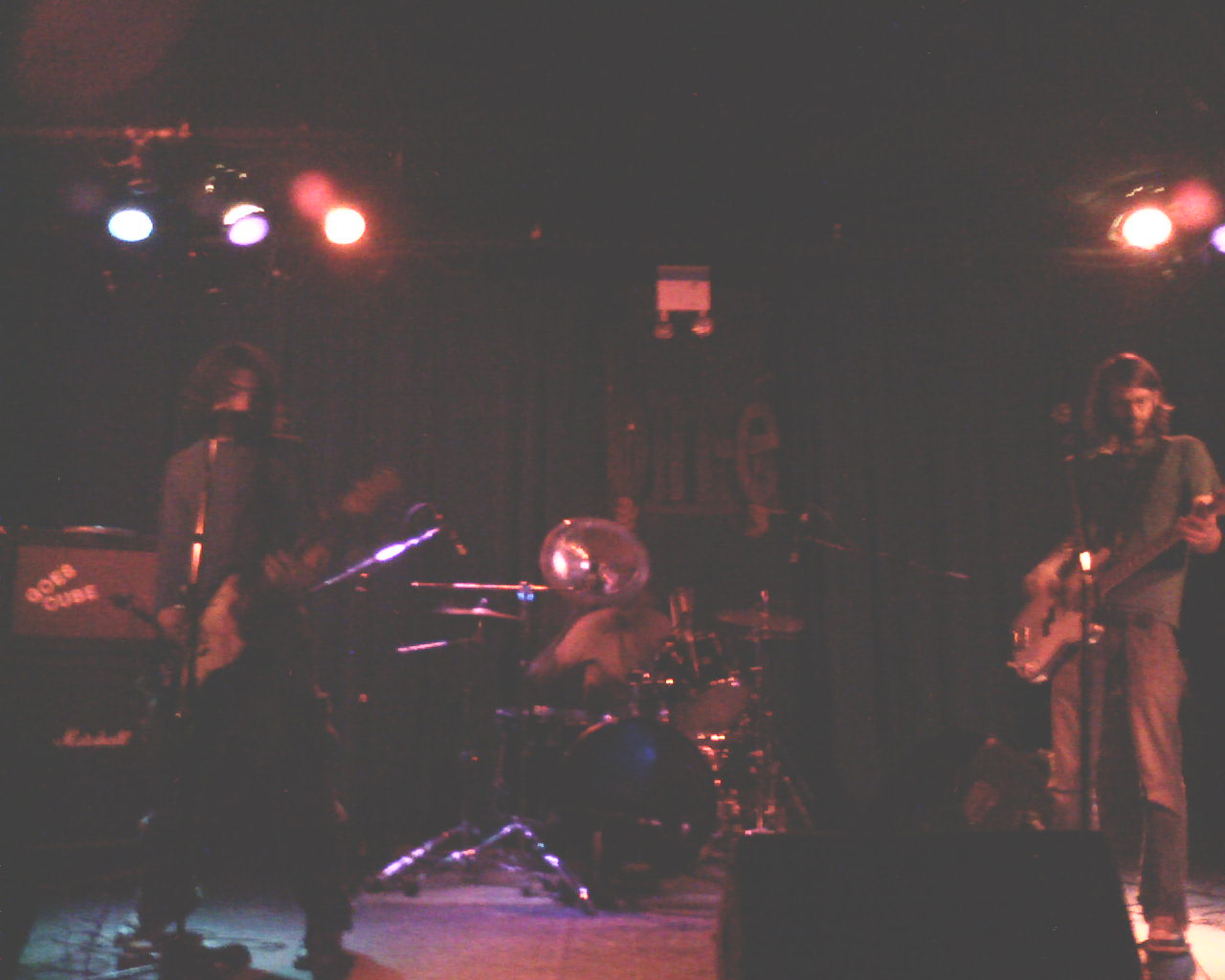
- Goes Cube playing in New York City in September 2006. L–R: David Obuchowski, Kenny Appell, Matthew Frey.

Background information
- Origin: Brooklyn, New York
- Genres: Rock, hardcore
- Years active: 2003–2016
- Label: The End
- Members: David Obuchowski; Kenny Appell; Matt Tyson
- Past members: Matthew Frey
- Website: Goes Cube

Goes Cube is an American rock band formed in late 2003 in Brooklyn, New York by guitarist–vocalist David Obuchowski and bassist Matthew Frey. In 2005, drummer Kenny Appell joined the band. In May 2009, Frey left the band and was replaced by Matt Tyson. In April 2016, after several years of inactivity, Goes Cube announced they would record a final before disbanding; this album, Shadows Swallowed the Flood, was released on October 21, 2016. The band has released three full-length albums and six EPs.

== History ==
While in high school, New Jersey resident David Obuchowski was part of a punk rock band called the Sick Terrific Nosebleeds. When a possible record deal with the independent label Sympathy for the Record Industry fell through, Obuchowski put his musical prospects on hold.

Later, while attending the University of Illinois, Obuchowski met Matthew Frey, and the two played in several "joke bands" together. The two parted ways after graduating, and Obuchowski became an advertising copywriter. This position left him "absolutely miserable," and he moved to Brooklyn, New York to reunite with Frey and start a band. Frey obtained the name Goes Cube from a poor Babel Fish back-translation of the phrase "Go Die" between English and German. During their first few years together, the duo used a drum machine known as "The Beating Machine", and named their songs numerically based on the rhythm tracks used (e.g. "Goes Cube Song 23").

After releasing a three-song self-titled demo, Obuchowski and Frey found this approach stale and they decided to find a drummer. In 2005 they acquired Kenny Appell, a high school bandmate of Obuchowski. This arrangement gave the band a new momentum which they channeled into their first major EP, Beckon the Dagger God (2007). The EP brought the band attention for "a heavy, assaultive style that's rare among acts from their area."

During their first show with Appell on January 26, 2006, the band met music journalist Matt Tyson, who was impressed with their music. Tyson remained in touch with the band, and eventually suggested he shoot a documentary about their upcoming US tour, to which they agreed. Tyson toured with Goes Cube for five weeks in early 2007. During this period, Tyson became close friends with the band. In early 2009, bassist Matthew Frey decided he wanted to retire from the band in order to pursue his own interests.

Goes Cube released their first full-length album, Another Day Has Passed, through The End Records on May 12, 2009. The album was well received. Brent Burton of Revolver called it "a-tight-and upbeat brand of metal that aims straight at the heart of the mainstream—and mostly hits strikes." Frey retired from the band on May 14, 2009, after the album's release show. Tyson was chosen as Frey's replacement, and joined them for their national tour which began May 15, 2009.

After the release of their 2011 album, In Tides and Drifts, the Goes Cube became mostly idle for several years while working on other projects: Obuchowski with Publicist UK and Distant Correspondent, and Appell with Cleanteeth and White Widows Pact. On April 7, 2016, the band announced they were entering the studio for one final album. Obuchowski explained: "It’s not right that Goes Cube would just fade away, like, oh, they must not be doing anything anymore. We just feel like we need to make this next album (and whatever shows we do to support it) our best yet, and our final statement."

== Musical style ==
Goes Cube's musical style features a mix of styles which the band calls a "blend of metal, punk, and full-on rock." The band's music has been described as rock, metal, hardcore, post-hardcore, avant-punk, and power indie, among others. The Boston Globe described the band's music as a mix of "pummeling punk, art noise, and – dare we say it? – sludgy grunge."

== Members ==
- David Obuchowski – guitar, vocals (2003–present)
- Kenny Appell – drums (2005–present)
- Matt Tyson – bass (2009–present)

=== Former members ===
- Matthew Frey – bass (2003–2009)

== Discography ==
=== Studio albums ===
- Another Day Has Passed (2009)
- In Tides and Drifts (2011)
- Shadows Swallowed the Flood (2016)

=== EPs ===
- Goes Cube (2005)
- Goes Cube (2006)
- Beckon the Dagger God (2007)
- Not What We Thought (2008)
- Hutchinson (2008)
- What Ruckus: Loud Songs From 2005-2011 (2012)

=== Singles ===
- Property / The Ban Has Lifted (2010)
- Coextinction Records 2 (2010)
