= Sworn testimony =

Evidence given by a witness ordered to tell the truth

Sworn testimony is evidence given by a witness who has made a commitment to tell the truth. If the witness is later found to have lied whilst bound by the commitment, they can often be charged with the crime of perjury. The types of commitment can include oaths, affirmations and promises which are explained in more detail below. The exact wording of the commitments vary from country to country.

== Types of commitment ==
The commitment can come in different forms depending on the situation of the witness. The types of commitment used in the United Kingdom are:

- Oath: A commitment made to the witness's deity, or on their holy book.
- Affirmation: A secular variant of the oath where the witness does not have to mention a deity or holy book.
- Promise: A commitment made by a witness under the age of 17, or of all witnesses if none of the accused are over the age of 17.

== Variations by country ==
=== Canada ===
Affirmation:

I solemnly affirm that the evidence to be given by me shall be the truth, the whole truth, and nothing but the truth.

=== India ===
Oath/Affirmation:

I do (swear in the name of God/solemnly affirm) that what I shall state shall be the truth, the whole truth, and nothing but the truth.

=== South Africa ===
Oath:

I swear that the evidence that I shall give shall be the truth, the whole truth, and nothing but the truth, so help me God.

Affirmation:

I solemnly affirm that the evidence that I shall give shall be the truth, the whole truth, and nothing but the truth.

=== United Kingdom and Australia ===
==== England, Wales and Australia ====
Oath:

I swear by [substitute Almighty God/Name of God (such as Jehovah) or the name of the holy scripture] that the evidence I shall give shall be the truth, the whole truth, and nothing but the truth.

Affirmation:

I do solemnly and sincerely and truly declare and affirm that the evidence I shall give shall be the truth, the whole truth, and nothing but the truth.

Promise:

I promise before Almighty God that the evidence which I shall give shall be the truth, the whole truth, and nothing but the truth.

In the UK, a person may give testimony at any age, but will not be sworn in unless 14 years old or over.

==== Scotland ====
Oath:

I swear by Almighty God that I will tell the truth, the whole truth, and nothing but the truth.

Affirmation:

I solemnly, sincerely and truly declare and affirm that I will tell the truth, the whole truth, and nothing but the truth.

=== United States ===
Oath:

Do you solemnly (swear/affirm) that you will tell the truth, the whole truth, and nothing but the truth?

These modifications to the oath were originally introduced in order to accommodate those who feel uncomfortable swearing religious oaths, such as Quakers, as well as to accommodate the irreligious. In United States v. Ward, the Ninth Circuit Court of Appeals ruled that certain other modifications of the oath were acceptable so long as they demonstrated "a moral or ethical sense of right and wrong".

Oath (California):

Do you solemnly state that the evidence you shall give in this issue (or matter) shall be the truth, the whole truth, and nothing but the truth, so help you God?

== See also ==
- Statutory declaration
- Affirmation in law
- Performativity
