= Madder Rose =

American alternative rock band

- Origin: New York City, United States
- Genres: Alternative rock
- Years active: 1991–1999; 2015–present
- Labels: Seed; Atlantic
- Members: Mary Lorson; Billy Coté; Johnny Kick; Matt Verta-Ray; Chris Giammalvo

Madder Rose is a New York City-based alternative rock band who recorded in the 1990s. After a 20-year hiatus, a new album was released in September 2019. The band is fronted by Mary Lorson, who shares songwriting duties with guitarist Billy Coté.

The two singer/songwriters continued their collaboration after Madder Rose disbanded in 1999, Coté as guitarist and producer on Lorson's three albums with Saint Low, Lorson as guest vocalist on Coté's Jazz Cannon album. Lorson and Coté have also created the original scores to several films, notably HBO's documentary What Remains: The Life and Work of Sally Mann, and in 2008, they released an album with Kathy Ziegler as the Piano Creeps.

The name Madder Rose came from the herb-based paint rose madder. Many of their songs, including "Panic On" and "Car Song", were featured in John Peel's end-of-year round-up, the Festive Fifty, major feature films, and television shows. The band has released six studio albums to date.

== History ==
Madder Rose was formed in 1991 in a Greenwich Village apartment, after Billy Coté, the band's songwriter, was informed by a mutual friend that Mary Lorson was looking for a project. They released their debut album Bring It Down in 1993 on Atlantic Records' quasi-independent label Seed Records, followed by the Swim EP later that year on the same label. Originally, Atlantic had asked to sign them, but Lorson turned them down. In an interview with The Miscellany News, she said she did so because she was "just too intimidated." The band's ascent to relative fame was secured when they landed a main-stage appearance at the 1993 Reading Festival, and by the critical acclaim Bring it Down received shortly after its release, including reviews in the Chicago Tribune, and being ranked as one of the top 10 albums of the year by the College Media Journal. Panic On was released on Atlantic Records in 1994. Madder Rose went on to release two more albums, Tragic Magic and Hello June Fool, before breaking up in 1999.

In February 2015, Coté indicated that he expected to release new Madder Rose material. A new album, entitled To Be Beautiful, was released by Trome Records on September 10, 2019. In 2023, it was followed by No One Gets Hurt Ever.

== Musical style ==
The band's music has been described as suggesting druggy languor, which inspired the British music press to trumpet Madder Rose as the second coming of the Velvet Underground. A 1994 review in Rolling Stone characterized their sound as an "alloy" of grunge and "the buttercup sighs of The Cranberries". Their sound progressed from indie pop rock, not unlike peers Velocity Girl, Lush, Helium, and Juliana Hatfield, to shoegaze and trip-hop.

== Other projects ==
After the breakup, Lorson founded the alt-folk outfit Saint Low, which featured Coté on guitar and production duties, releasing its eponymous debut in 2000. This was followed, under the name Mary Larson & Saint Low, by Tricks for Dawn (2002) and Realistic (2006). 2011 saw the release of Burn Baby Burn under the name Mary B. Lorson & The Soubrettes.

Coté released the album Amateur Soul Surgery in 2000, and two 12" singles as The Jazz Cannon with vocalist Don Greene, which also feature vocal contributions from Lorson. Coté subsequently released an album with vocalist/songwriter Uniit Carruyo under the name Glen the Owl (also featuring vocal contributions from Lorson) which, like the early Madder Rose releases, featured sleeve art by Coté.

Coté and Lorson together released a largely instrumental album Piano Creeps under their own names on Cooking Vinyl in 2003. Coté, Lorson, and multi-instrumentalist Kathy Zeigler then released an album as The Piano Creeps in 2008, called Future Blues (For Me and You), on The Kora Records.

Currently, Billy Coté works occasionally with Johnny Dowd. He has guested on guitar on two of Dowd's albums. Together, they have contributed the song "Bound for Hell" to a Love and Rockets' tribute album, New Tales to Tell, and another, "Constant Waiting", to We Are Only Riders, a Jeffrey Lee Pierce tribute collection. Coté has also featured on moog and guitars Evi Vine's second album Give Your Heart to the Hawks, released in 2015.

== Band members ==
- Billy Coté – guitar
- Mary Lorson – vocals, guitar
- Matt Verta-Ray – bass, vocals
- Rick Kubic a.k.a. Johnny Kick – drums, vocals
- Chris Giammalvo – bass

== Discography ==
Albums

- Bring It Down (1993)
- Panic On (1994)
- Tragic Magic (1997)
- Hello June Fool (1999)
- To Be Beautiful (2019)
- No One Gets Hurt Ever (2023)

EPs

- Swim (1993)
- Car Song (1994)
- The Love You Save (1995)

Singles

- "Beautiful John" (1993)
