= Mary Lorson =

American writer, musician and composer

- Born: Mary Lorson; New York City, U.S.
- Genres: Alternative rock
- Occupation: Musician
- Instruments: Vocals, guitar, piano
- Years active: 1991–present

Mary Lorson is an American writer, musician and composer. Best known as the lead singer of alternative pop groups Madder Rose and Saint Low, Lorson has gone on to release albums with The Piano Creeps and Mary Lorson & the Soubrettes. She lives in Ithaca, New York.

== Biography ==
Lorson was born and raised in the suburbs of New York City and formed Madder Rose with Billy Coté in 1991 in Greenwich Village. When Madder Rose disbanded in 1999 she founded Saint Low with bassist Stahl Caso, violinist Joe Myer, pianist Michael Stark, vocalist Jennie Stearns, and drummer Zaun Marshburn. Lorson and Coté toured with Tanya Donelly from 1996-7.

Lorson and Coté have collaborated on film scores including the original score for "What Remains: The Life and Art of Sally Mann" for Steven Cantor and HBO. She and Coté have a son, Roman. A breast cancer survivor and high school English teacher, Lorson is the author of "Freak Baby and the Kill Thought," an original screenplay about the life of vaudeville singer and actress Eva Tanguay. The album "BurnBabyBurn," released by Mary Lorson & the Soubrettes in 2011, features a version of Tanguay's 1922 song "I Don't Care."

Lorson's projects also have included developing a television series, "Old School"; scoring the independent web series "The Chanticleer"; a multimedia performance memoir, "Signal"; and setting a chapter of James Joyce's Finnegans Wake to music, for the Waywords and Meansigns project. Her 11th full-length album, "Themes From Whatever," was released in November 2017.

== Discography ==
Studio albums

- Piano Creeps (with Billy Coté) (2003)

=== With Billy Coté ===
- Two Left Shoes, original score, 2003
- Barrier Device, original score, 2004
- What Remains, original score, 2007

=== Mary Brett Lorson ===
- Themes from Whatever, 2017

=== Mary Lorson & the Soubrettes ===
- BurnBabyBurn, 2011

=== The Piano Creeps ===
- Future Blues (for me and you), 2008

=== Mary Lorson & Saint Low ===
- Realistic, 2006
- Tricks for Dawn, 2002
- Saint Low, 2000

=== Madder Rose ===
- Beautiful John (Single) (1993)
- Bring It Down, 1993
- Swim (1993)
- Car Song (EP), (1994)
- Panic On, 1994
- The Love You Save (EP), 1995
- Tragic Magic, 1997
- Hello June Fool, 1999
