= Mike Block =

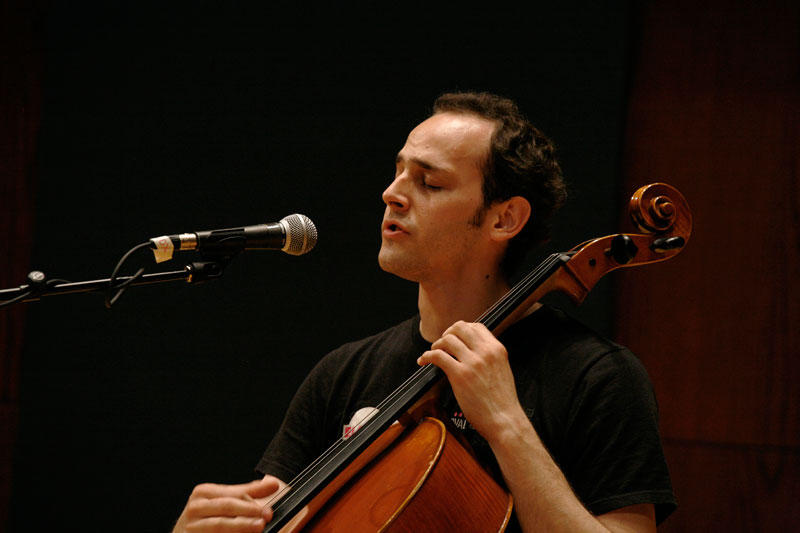
- Mike Block plays the cello

Background information
- Born: Michael Glen Block; May 25, 1982 (age 44); Boston, Massachusetts, U.S.
- Genres: Classical; folk; jazz; bluegrass; rock; pop
- Occupations: Singer; musician; composer; arranger
- Instruments: Cello; vocals
- Years active: 2006–present
- Website: mikeblockmusic.com

Michael Glen Block (born May 25, 1982) is an American cellist, singer, composer, and arranger.

== Career ==
Block has played second cello alongside Yo-Yo Ma. He also performed in Mark O'Connor's Appalachia Waltz trio for three years. Block has performed with Bobby McFerrin, Lenny Kravitz, Shakira, The National, Joe Zawinul, Alison Krauss, and Rachel Barton Pine. Block plays with the Silkroad Ensemble. Block has served as musical director for Yo-Yo Ma, Bobby McFerrin, Lil' Buck Sinegal, Bill Irwin, Marcus Printup, The Silkroad Ensemble, and The Knights.

Block leads the Mike Block Trio alongside Joe K. Walsh (mandolin/vocals) and Zachariah Hickman (bass/vocals.) Most recently, their album What Now? was released on Bright Shiny Things records in 2022.

Block plays regularly as part of a duo with Indian tabla player Sandeep Das. In 2022, they released their debut album Where the Soul Never Dies on the Bright Shiny Things record label.

Alongside balafon player Balla Kouyaté, Block is a member of Djékady. The project "puts Malian music into conversation with American folk music and contemporary styles". Along with Block and Kouyaté, the band consists of Sekou Dembele, Idrissa Koné, Luke Okerlund, and Mike Rivard.

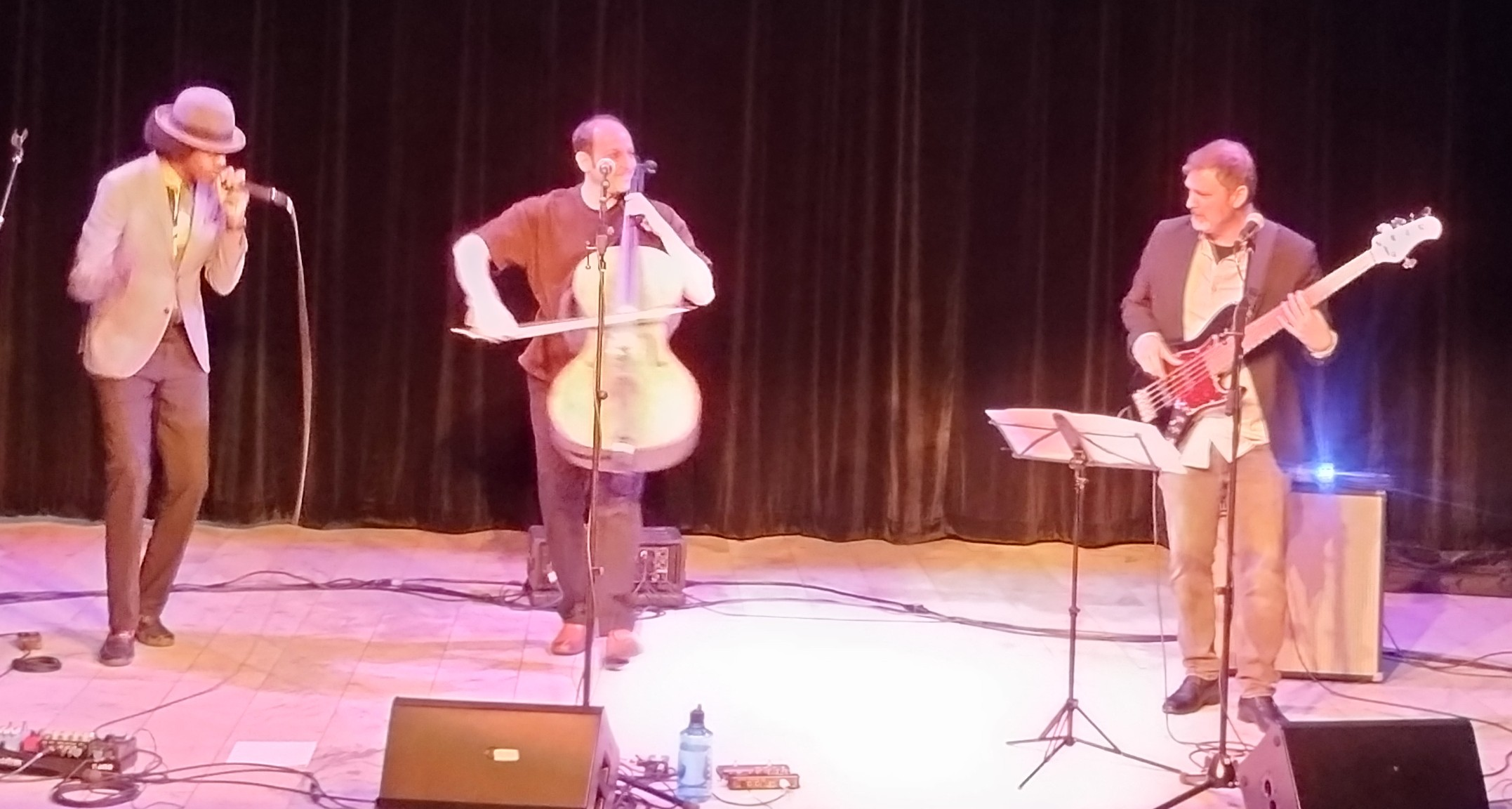
Biribá Union performing in 2025. Left to right: Christylez Bacon, Mike Block, Edward Perez.

Since 2022, Block has been a member of Biribá Union along with Christylez Bacon and Patricia Ligia. The trio originally met at Silkroad's Global Musician Workshop. Their music is a blend of "Brazilian beats, bluegrass, jazz, classical, hip-hop, funk, and pop." Their debut album will be released on the Bright Shiny Things label in 2025.

== Teaching ==
In 2012, Block was appointed Associate Professor of Music at the Berklee College of Music in Boston, and in 2018, he joined the faculty of New England Conservatory. Notable students include Laufey and Nana Ouyang. He has presented at Stanford University, Princeton University, Harvard University, New York University, Berklee College of Music, Cleveland Institute of Music, New England Conservatory, Belmont University, Southern Methodist University, Sam Houston State University, Illinois State University, Illinois Wesleyan University, and University of Arkansas.

In 2006, he received Suzuki method certification in music education from the New York City-based School for Strings, under Pamela Devenport.

From 2009 to 2012, he was the Lead Teaching Artist for Silk Road Connect, a partnership between Silkroad and schools in New York City and Boston.

In June 2024, Block, alongside his wife, Hanneke Cassel, designed and taught an artist's retreat called "Insight/Onsight: A Creative Retreat" at Fallingwater, a UNESCO World Heritage Site designed by famed architect Frank Lloyd Wright in Mill Run, Pennsylvania. Musicians of any instrument can apply for the program, which runs each June for one week. The program consists of both instructor led and independent sessions, which are all "inspired by Frank Lloyd Wright's philosophy of 'learning by doing'".

Block has been teaching cello online in partnership with ArtistWorks since 2015.

== Mike Block String Camp ==
In 2009 Block founded the Mike Block String Camp (MBSC) in Vero Beach, Florida. World-class faculty provides instruction in multiple traditions, develop improvisational skills, and coach student bands to prepare for performances.

== Products ==
In 2015, Block patented the Block Cello Strap, "the first product designed so you can stand & move while playing the cello comfortably with standard technique."

Mike is also the Chief Musical Advisor for Forte3D, creator of the world's first 3D-printed carbon fiber cello, which appeared on season 17 episode 6 of ABC’s Shark Tank. The company manufactures "cellos with bodies and necks made with cutting-edge 3D printing technology using high-strength carbon fiber and polymers, combined with traditional material components like wooden bridges and sound posts, ebony fingerboards, and standard tailpieces, endpins, and tuning pegs."

== Play for the Vote ==
In 2020, Mike founded Play Vote the Vote, a 501(c)(3) nonprofit organization "dedicated to amplifying voter turnout and civic engagement through the transformative power of live music." The initiative aims to "make voting a more positive experience for everyone, using the power of music to build community and amplify voter turnout." Musicians of any age, background, or style can sign up to play at their local polling location.

== Other work ==
From 2011 to 2012, Block was the Artistic Director and host of GALA Brooklyn: "Global Art – Local Art", a Music Festival in Brooklyn. Block started the Vero Beach International Music Festival in 2014, which features performances by students and faculty of the Mike Block String Camp. He has appeared on Late Night with Conan O'Brien, National Public Radio's St. Paul Sunday, Regis and Kelly, VH1, the Disney Channel, WNBC-TV with Chuck Scarborough, and the CBS Early Show. He worked with director Yaron Zilberman as a music consultant for A Late Quartet, a 2011 movie starring Philip Seymour Hoffman and Christopher Walken.

== Education ==
Block attended Cleveland Institute of Music (B.M. 2004) and The Juilliard School (M.M. 2006).

== Personal life ==
In January 2014, Block married fiddler and composer Hanneke Cassel. He currently lives in Boston with his wife and daughter.

Block was struck by a Manhattan taxi in 2009, with injuries that required multiple surgeries.

== Collaborations ==
- Mike Block's Biribá Union with Christylez Bacon and Patricia Ligia
- Mike Block Trio with Joe K. Walsh and Zachariah Hickman
- Darol Anger's Republic of Strings
- Djékady (feat. Balla Kouyaté and Mike Block)
- Duo with Hanneke Cassel, Celtic fiddler
- Duo with Sandeep Das, Indian tabla player
- Duo with Balla Kouyate, balafon player from Mali
- Duo with Rachel Barton Pine, classical violinist
- Duo with Clay Ross, guitarist and singer
- Duo with Yang Wei, Chinese pipa player
- Duo with Derek Gripper, South African guitarist

== Discography ==
- Words R Words, Mike Block Band (2009)
- After the Factory Closes, Mike Block Band (2010)
- Naïve Melody, Triborough Trio (2011)
- Brick by Brick (2012)
- Final Night at Camp (2018)
- Echoes of Bach, with Shane Shanahan (2018)
- Saturday Morning in Boston, with Derek Gripper (2019)
- Walls of Time (2019)
- It’s Time to Dance (2019)
- 13 Shades I 13 Farbtöne, with Stephan Braun (2019)
- Step into the Void: The Complete Bach Cello Suites (2020)
- Guzo (2020)
- The Edge of the Atmosphere (2020)
- Where the Soul Never Dies, Sandeep Das & Mike Block Duo (2021)
- Planispheres (2021)
- Machines That Fly (2022)
- Round and Round; Kids’ Songs for Mixed Ages, with Barry Rothman (2022)
- What Now?, Mike Block Trio (2022)

With Rez Abbasi

- Things to Come (Sunnyside, 2009)
