= Laclede =

Laclede, LaClede or La Clede may refer:

- Pierre Laclède, founder of St. Louis, Missouri
  - Laclede's Landing, St. Louis
- LaClede Town in St. Louis
- LaClede Township, Fayette County, Illinois
  - La Clede, Illinois
- Laclede, Missouri, a small city
- Laclede County, Missouri
- The Laclede Group, public utility holding company
  - Laclede Gas Company, its primary subsidiary
- Laclede, Idaho
