= Baikida Carroll =

American jazz trumpeter

Baikida Carroll (born January 15, 1947) is an American jazz trumpeter.

Carroll studied at Southern Illinois University and at the Armed Forces School of Music. Following this he became a member of the Black Artists Group in St. Louis, where he directed their big band. This group recorded in Europe in the 1970s.

== Biography ==
Carroll was born in St. Louis, Missouri, United States, and attended Vashon and Soldan High School. He studied trumpet with Vernon Nashville. His early influences were Clark Terry and Lee Morgan. Carroll worked with the All City Jazz Band, whose members included Lester Bowie, J.D. Parran and James ”Jabbo” Ware. While still in high school he worked with Albert King, Little Milton, and Oliver Sain. Carroll joined the United States Army in 1965 and served in the 3rd Infantry Division Band in Wurzburg, Germany. In 1968, he returned to St. Louis and led the Baikida Carroll Sextet, also becoming orchestra conductor/director of the Black Artists Group of St. Louis (BAG), a multidisciplinary arts collective that brought him into contact with Julius Hemphill, Oliver Lake, Hamiet Bluiett, and John Hicks. In 1972, Carroll, Lake, Joseph Bowie, Charles "Bobo" Shaw, and Floyd LeFlore ventured to Paris, France, touring as Oliver Lake and the Black Artists Group. He also performed with Anthony Braxton, Alan Silva, Steve Lacy, and his own quartet. He taught theory and trumpet at The American Center in Paris and was artist in residence at the Cité internationale des arts.

Carroll moved to New York City in 1975 and was active in the free jazz community. He also taught at Queens College. He began composing music for plays with Joseph Papp at the New York Public Theater and continued to score for Broadway and WNET-TV as part of the series The American Playhouse and at McCarter Theatre. In 1981, he performed at the Woodstock Jazz Festival that celebrated the tenth anniversary of the Creative Music Studio. His performance and recorded history includes works with Julius Hemphill, Howard Johnson, Sam Rivers, Charlie Haden, Jack DeJohnette, Cecil Taylor, Reggie Workman, Oliver Lake, Carla Bley, Wadada Leo Smith, Jay McShann, Bobby Bradford, Roscoe Mitchell, Tim Berne and Naná Vasconcelos.

== Discography ==
=== As leader ===
- Orange Fish Tears (Palm, 1974)
- The Spoken Word (HatHUT, 1977–1978 [1979])
- Shadows and Reflections (Soul Note, 1982)
- Door of the Cage (Soul Note, 1995)
- Marionettes on a High Wire (OmniTone, 2001)

=== As sideman ===
- Human Arts Ensemble, Whisper of Dharma, Universal Justice, 1972
- Solidarity Unit, Inc., Red, Black and Green, Universal Justice, 1972
- Julius Hemphill, Dogon A.D., Mbari, 1972
- Oliver Lake, NTU, Ntu: Point from Which Creation Begins, Freedom, 1976
- Black Artists Group, In Paris, Aries 1973, BAG Records, 1973; reissued by Aguirre in 2018
- Julius Hemphill, Coon Bid'ness, Freedom, 1975
- Hidden Strength, Hidden Strength, United Artists, 1975
- Michael Gregory, Heart and Center, Novus Records, 1979
- Michael Gregory, Gifts, Novus, 1979
- Vinny Golia, Openhearted, Nine Winds, 1979
- Oliver Lake, Prophet, Black Saint, 1980
- Muhal Richard Abrams, Mama and Daddy, Black Saint, 1980
- Muhal Richard Abrams, Blues Forever, Black Saint, 1980
- Oliver Lake, Plug It, Gramavision, 1982
- Oliver Lake, Clevont Fitzhubert, Black Saint, 1981
- Muhal Richard Abrams, Rejoicing with the Light, Black Saint, 1980
- Jack DeJohnette, Inflation Blues, ECM, 1983
- David Murray, Live at Sweet Basil Volume 1, Black Saint, 1984
- David Murray, Live at Sweet Basil Volume 2, Black Saint, 1984
- Michele Rosewoman, The Source, Black Saint, 1984
- John Carter, Castles of Ghana, Gramavision, 1986
- David Murray, New Life, Black Saint, 1988
- Carla Bley, Watts Work Family Album, ECM, 1989
- Oliver Lake, Gramavision Tenth Anniversary Sampler, Gramavision, 1990
- Graham Parker, Struck by Lightning, Demon, 1991
- Charles Papasoff, Papasoff, Red Toucan, 1993
- Steve Weisberg, I can't stand another night alone (in bed with you), ECM, 1994
- New York Collective, Naxos, 1996
- Pheeroan akLaff, Global Mantras, Modern Masters, 1997
- New York Collective, I Don't Know This World Without Don Cherry, Naxos, 1998
- Sam Rivers, Inspiration, BMG/RCA Victor, 1999
- Sam Rivers, Culmination, BMG/RCA Victor, 1999
- Alan Silva, H.Con.Res.57/Treasure Box, Eremite, 2003
- Oliver Lake, Cloth, Passin' Thru, 2003
- John Lindberg, Winter Birds, Between The Lines, 2005
- Leslie Ritter, This Christmas Morning, Collective Works, 2005
- Tim Berne Octet, Insomnia, Clean Feed, 2011
- Julius Hemphill, The Boyé Multi-National Crusade for Harmony, New World, 2021

=== As producer ===
- Danielle Woerner, She Walks In Beauty, Parnassus, 1998
- Jeff Siegel, Magical Spaces, Consolidated Artist Productions, 2005
- Danielle Woerner, Voices of the Valley, Albany Music Distribution, 2006
