= Floyd LeFlore =

- Born: Floyd LeFlore; 1940
- Died: 2014 (aged 73–74) St. Louis, MO
- Genres: Jazz, avant-garde jazz, free jazz
- Occupation: Musician
- Instruments: Trumpet, percussion

Floyd LeFlore (1940–2014) was a jazz composer, trumpet player, and poet from St. Louis. In 1968, LeFlore helped to found the Black Artists Group (BAG).

== Biography ==
LeFlore was the nephew of Clarence "Bucky" Jarman, a guitarist also of St. Louis. In high school, LeFlore attended Sumner High School with many other students who later became notable jazz musicians. From 1962 to 1965, LeFlore served in the military. For a brief time between 1972 and 1973, LeFlore lived and performed in Paris where the album In Paris, Aries 1973 was recorded with other BAG musicians. LeFlore lived in LaClede Town with many other BAG members, appreciating the "racial, socio-economic, and immigrant mix provided for his children.". LeFlore was married to Shirley LeFlore and had three daughters including the author Lyah LeFlore-Ituen. LeFlore died in 2014.

== Discography ==
=== As performer ===
- 1970 Ofamfa (trumpet and small instruments) with Children of the Sun (Universal Justice Records)
- 1970 Red, Black and Green (trumpet) with BAG Solidarity Unit, Inc. (BAG Live Concert Series)
- 1972 Whisper of Dharma with Human Arts Ensemble (Universal Justice)
- 1973 In Paris, Aries 1973 (trumpet, vocal, misc. instruments) with Black Artists Group expatriates (very limited initial release; reissued by Aguirre in 2018)
- 1973 Funky Donkey Volume 1 & 2 with Luther Thomas Human Arts Ensemble (Creative Consciousness; reissued as CD on Atavistic/Unheard Music Series)
- 1976 Ntu: Point from Which Creation Begins (trumpet, percussion) (Arista/Freedom)

=== As leader ===
- 1997 City Sidewalk Street Song Suite (Vid Recordings : Music Masters MM-34612)
