= In Paris (disambiguation) =

"Niggas in Paris" is a song by Jay-Z and Kanye West.

In Paris may also refer to:

- In Paris, Aries 1973, a live album by the Black Artists Group, 1973
- In Paris, A.W.O.L., a film by Roland D. Reed, 1936
