= Abdul Wadud (musician) =

American cellist (1947–2022)

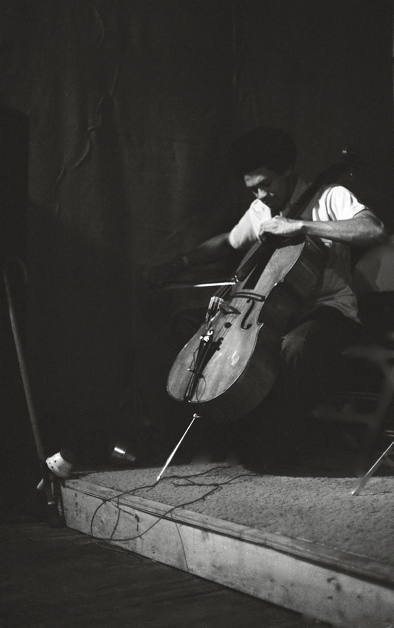
- Wadud in 1976

Background information
- Born: Ronald Earsall DeVaughn; April 30, 1947; Cleveland, Ohio, U.S.
- Died: August 10, 2022 (aged 75) Cleveland
- Genres: Jazz, avant-garde jazz, classical
- Occupation: Musician
- Instrument: Cello
- Years active: 1965–2022

Abdul Wadud (born Ronald Earsall DeVaughn; April 30, 1947 – August 10, 2022) was an American cellist known for his work in jazz and classical settings. Jazz musician and fellow composer Tomeka Reid hailed Abdul Wadud's "Camille" in a 2020 feature in the New York Times on music that one could play to make friends fall in love with the cello.

He grew up in Cleveland, Ohio, the youngest of twelve children in a musical family; his father played trumpet and French horn. He studied cello in the city’s public schools while also playing saxophone, and took private lessons with members of the Cleveland Orchestra. He first attended Youngstown State University, then transferred to the Oberlin Conservatory, where he converted to Islam and adopted the name Abdul Wadud. In Cleveland he co-founded the Black Unity Trio with saxophonist Yusuf Mumin and drummer Hasan Shahid; the group’s album Al-Fatihah was recorded in 1968 and released in 1969. Wadud later earned a master’s degree in performance at the State University of New York at Stony Brook and worked in orchestras including the New Jersey Symphony, alongside an active presence on the 1970s loft-jazz scene.

His son is R&B singer Raheem DeVaughn.

Wadud died on August 10, 2022, at the age of 75.

== By Myself and legacy ==
Wadud’s only solo album, By Myself, was recorded in New York in 1977 and self-released the same year on his Bisharra label. Critics and musicians have highlighted the record’s blend of classical technique with chordal strumming, pizzicato lines, and blues-inflected improvisation, marking it as a landmark for improvised cello. After decades out of print, the album was remastered and reissued in 2023 by the Cleveland label Gotta Groove Records, prompting renewed critical attention and tributes from improvising string players who cite Wadud’s influence.

== Discography ==
=== As leader ===
- 1977: By Myself Bishara, 1978
- 1976: Live In New York (with Julius Hemphill) Red Records, 1978
- 1979: Straight Ahead/Free At Last (with Leroy Jenkins) Red
- 1984: I've Known Rivers (with James Newton & Anthony Davis) Gramavision
- 1986: Black Swan Quartet (with Akbar Ali, Eileen Folson & Reggie Workman) Minor Music
- 1990: Trio^2 (with James Newton & Anthony Davis) Gramavision
- 1993: Oakland Duets (with Julius Hemphill) Music & Arts

=== As sideman ===
- Black Unity Trio – Al-Fatihah (1971) Salaam
- Frank Lowe – Fresh (1974) Black Lion
- George Lewis – Shadowgraph 5 (1977) Black Saint
- Charles "Bobo" Shaw – The Streets of St. Louis (1977)
- Oliver Lake – Shine! (1978)
- Barry Altschul – Another Time/Another Place (1978) Muse
- Michael Franks – Tiger In The Rain (1979) Warner Brothers
- Muhal Richard Abrams – Rejoicing with the Light (Black Saint, 1983)
- David Murray – The People's Choice (1988) Columbia
- Marty Ehrlich Dark Woods Ensemble – Emergency Peace (1991) New World
- Juma Sultan's Aboriginal Music Society – Father of Origin (Eremite, 2011) recorded in 1970–1971

With James Newton

- Paseo Del Mar (1978)
- Portraits (1982)
- Romance And Revolution (1986)

With Julius Hemphill

- Dogon A.D. (Mbari, 1972)
- Coon Bid'ness (Mbari, 1975)
- Raw Materials and Residuals (Black Saint, 1977)
- Flat-Out Jump Suite (Black Saint, 1980)
- Live from the New Music Cafe (Music & Arts, 1991)
- The Boyé Multi-National Crusade for Harmony (New World, 2021)

With Arthur Blythe

- Light Blue: Arthur Blythe Plays Thelonious Monk (1983) Columbia
- Elaborations (1982) Columbia
- Illusions (1980) Columbia
- The Grip (1977) India Navigation
- Metamorphosis (1977) India Navigation

With Anthony Davis

- Of Blues And Dreams (1978) Sackville
- Epistemes (1981)
- Undines (1986)
