= Human Arts Ensemble =

American musical collective

Human Art Ensemble
- Genres: Free jazz, jazz fusion
- Past members: Joseph Bowie; Lester Bowie; Marty Ehrlich; Oliver Lake; John Lindberg; Luther Thomas; John Zorn; Charles "Bobo" Shaw; Abdallah Yakub; Abdul Wadud; Alan Suits; Butch Smith; Carol Marshall; Dominique Gaumont; Hamiet Bluiett; J. D. Parran; James Marshall; Julius Hemphill; Victor Reef; Vincent Terrell

The Human Arts Ensemble was a 1970s musical collective operating in St. Louis, Missouri. Members explored free jazz and loosely associated themselves with the Association for the Advancement of Creative Musicians (AACM) and the Black Artists' Group (BAG) collective. It was formed in 1971 with the idea that performers could perform in the ensemble, without restrictions as to the performer's race. Additionally, public funding had ended for musical associations that were suspected of having connections with radical organizations. It disbanded in 1977.

Human Arts Ensemble co-founder, saxophonist James Marshall, continues to pursue the vision of HAE to this day in Tucson, Arizona. Originally, after its activity in St. Louis, Jim and his then wife (and HAE co-founder) Carol, moved to Oregon to continue the project there in the context of a musician's commune. Unfortunately, neither the marriage (they're still friends) nor the commune lasted. However, when Jim moved to Tucson, Arizona, he continued to pursue his vision of free form and soulful jazz improvisation.

Jim worked closely with another partner from the St. Louis days—Ajule Eneke Rutlin, who died suddenly in 2006. Ajule had been associated with the Black Artists Group, which inspired the foundation of HAE, and was also a founding member of HAE. The Human Arts Ensemble was not only committed to the beauty that can emerge from humans interacting freely and without restriction, but it also consciously, from the beginning, saw its music as a direct, soulful contradiction to a world of hate produced by racism, consumerism, greed, and war. To this day, the new incarnation of HAE that exists in Tucson still maintains that vision. During the 90's Human Arts Ensemble played benefits to raise money for Iraqi civilians suffering under the effect of US/UN sanctions, and HAE members have regularly performed at anti-war protests.

== Discography ==
- 1972: Whisper of Dharma (Universal Justice)
- 1973: Poem of Gratitude (Universal Justice)
- 1973: Under the Sun (Freedom)
- 1974: Streets Of St. Louis as Charles Bobo Shaw with Human Arts Ensemble (Moers Music)
- 1978: Live In Trio Performance Vols. 1 & 2 (Circle Records (Germany))
- 1978: Junk Trap as Charles Bobo Shaw with Human Arts Ensemble (Black Saint)
