= Tricks of the Trade =

Tricks of the Trade may refer to:

- "Tricks of the Trade" (Matlock), a 2025 two-part television episode
- "Tricks of the Trade" (Suits), a 2011 television episode
- Tricks of the Trade, a 1990 album by Detroit's Most Wanted
- Tricks of the Trade, Vol. II: The Money Is Made, a 1992 album by Detroit's Most Wanted
- Tricks of the Trade, a 1990 Hardy Boys novel
