= Red, Black and Green (album) =

Red, Black & Green

Live album by Solidarity Unit, Inc.
- Released: 1972; 2008
- Recorded: September 18, 1970
- Venues: BAG Room, East St. Louis, Illinois
- Genre: Free jazz
- Length: 1:07:20
- Labels: Universal Justice Records; 29489; Eremite; MTE-52
- Producers: Charles "Bobo" Shaw (original release), Michael Ehlers (reissue)

Red, Black & Green is a live album by the Black Artists Group-affiliated band known as Solidarity Unit, Inc., led by drummer Charles "Bobo" Shaw. The group's sole release, it was recorded on September 18, 1970, at the BAG Room in East St. Louis, Illinois, and was initially issued on LP by Shaw's Universal Justice Records in 1972 as part of the BAG Live Concert Series. On the album, Shaw is joined by saxophonist and flutist Oliver Lake, trumpeters Floyd LeFlore and Baikida Carroll (listed as Baikida Yaseen), trombonist Joseph Bowie, guitarist Richard Martin, pianist Clovis Bordeaux, bassists Kada Kayan and Carl Richardson, and percussionist Danny Trice. In 2008, the album was reissued on LP in remastered form and in limited quantities by Eremite Records.

Red, Black & Green marked the recorded debut of Bowie, Carroll, and Martin. It was dedicated to Jimi Hendrix, who died on the day of the concert.

== Reception ==
Writing for DownBeat, John Corbett called the album a "seminal work of St. Louis' BAG," and commented: "Open, a tad funky and venomously strong with room for drift, it was a tornado of a recording that should have been heard, though with its tiny private pressing it remained the domain of specialists alone."

In a review for Point of Departure, Stuart Broomer wrote: "the music has an incendiary power, always alert and driving, but with sudden explosive entries by the two trumpets that suggest the drama and power of R 'n' B. While many of the instruments blur into a collective roar, there are some very fine moments."

Clifford Allen of All About Jazz described the album as "a raw and far-reaching set that provides an excellent window into the activities of the Black Artists Group," and stated: "If you were to compare the AACM and BAG aesthetics on the basis of a single title, BAG music would come off as being significantly rougher and more unhinged. Though the use of 'little instruments' like flutes, harmonica, bells and noisemakers is prevalent, there's a sense of raw urgency in the proceedings, a combination of urban squalor blues and an attitude reminiscent of Lester Bowie's 'good old country ass-kicking'."

In an article for Arthur, Byron Coley and Thurston Moore noted that the recording is "filled with some of the craziest electric guitar ever, courtesy of the late Richard Martin," and remarked: "The sonics have the same raw galacto-fidelity associated with Arkestral recordings of the same period, and this is a great goddamn explosion. You bet!"

== Track listing ==
Track timings not provided.

Side A

1. "Something to Play On" (Charles "Bobo" Shaw)

Side B

1. "Floreo" (Floyd LeFlore)
2. "Beyond the New Horizon" (Charles "Bobo" Shaw)

== Personnel ==
- Charles "Bobo" Shaw – percussion
- Oliver Lake – alto saxophone, flute
- Floyd LeFlore – trumpet
- Baikida Carroll (listed as Baikida Yaseen) – trumpet
- Joseph Bowie – trombone
- Richard Martin – electric guitar
- Clovis Bordeaux – piano
- Kada Kayan – bass
- Carl Richardson – bass
- Danny Trice – conga drums
