= Rope-A-Dope =

Studio album by Lester Bowie
- Released: 1976
- Recorded: June 17, 1975
- Studio: Blue Rock; New York City
- Genre: Jazz
- Length: 35:15
- Label: Muse
- Producer: Michael Cuscuna

Lester Bowie chronology
Fast Last! (1974)	Rope-A-Dope (1976)	African Children (1978)

Rope-A-Dope is an album trumpeter Lester Bowie, recorded for the Muse label and released in 1976. It features performances by Bowie, Joseph Bowie, Malachi Favors Maghostut, Don Moye, Charles Bobo Shaw and Raymund Cheng.

== Reception ==
Professional ratings
Review scores
Source	Rating
AllMusic	4/5 stars
The Rolling Stone Jazz Record Guide	3/5 stars

In his review for AllMusic, Scott Yanow stated: "Throughout, the highly expressive Lester Bowie is heard in prime form".

== Track listing ==
- All compositions by Lester Bowie except where indicated
- Recorded at Blue Rock Studios, New York City, June 17, 1975
1. "Tender Openings" 9:29
2. "St. Louis Blues (Chicago Style)" 9:36 (Handy)
3. "Mirage" 6:40
4. "Rope-a-Dope" 9:30

== Personnel ==
- Lester Bowie: trumpet
- Joseph Bowie: trombone (tracks 2 & 4), percussion (track 1)
- Malachi Favors Maghostut: bass
- Don Moye: drums (tracks 1, 2, & 3), congas (track 4)
- Charles Bobo Shaw: drums (tracks 1, 2 & 4)
- Raymund Cheng: violin (track 1)
