= Thermonuclear Sweat =

Studio album by Defunkt
- Released: 1982
- Studio: Olympic, London; Vanguard and Electric Lady, NYC
- Genre: Jazz, funk, punk
- Label: Hannibal
- Producer: Joe Boyd

Defunkt chronology
The Razor's Edge (1981)	Thermonuclear Sweat (1982)	In America (1988)

Thermonuclear Sweat is an album by the American musical group Defunkt. It was released in 1982 via Hannibal Records. The group broke up after the release of the album, reforming in 1986.

== Production ==
The album was produced by Joe Boyd. Aside from the leader and trombonist Joseph Bowie, the guitar player Kelvyn Bell was the only other member who had played on the debut. Vernon Reid played guitar on six of the album's tracks. "Big Bird (Au Private)" is a tribute to Charlie Parker.

== Critical reception ==
Professional ratings
Review scores
Source	Rating
AllMusic	3/5 stars
Robert Christgau	B+
The Encyclopedia of Popular Music	4/5 stars
MusicHound R&B: The Essential Album Guide	5/5 stars

The Washington Post wrote: "As a dance band, Defunkt is best at break-neck rhythms—'Illusion', the tongue-in- cheek, feet-firmly-in-the-groove 'Avoid the Funk', and the boppish escapade and tribute to Charlie Parker, 'Big Bird (Au Private)' on which the band's jazz roots are well displayed." Trouser Press called the album "sweeter-sounding and jazzier" than the group's debut.

Robert Christgau lamented that the group's cover of "For the Love of Money" "sounds like slumming, especially from a guy who couldn't outsing Kenny Gamble in the shower." The New York Times thought that "when this band plays funk, it plays hard, dance-floor funk, with a cavalier disregard for the pop sweetening most funk bands add to their records in order to get radio play and hits."

Reviewing the reissue that paired Thermonuclear Sweat with the debut, The Independent called the albums "groundbreaking" and among the 1980s' "alternative essentials."

== Track listing ==
No.	Title	Length
1.	"Illusion"	5:33
2.	"I Tried to Live Alone"	5:08
3.	"Cocktail Hour (Blue Bossa)"	3:26
4.	"Ooh Baby"	6:05
5.	"Avoid the Funk"	4:26
6.	"Big Bird (Au Private)"	2:07
7.	"For the Love of Money"	5:54
8.	"Believing in Love"	7:14
