= In America (Defunkt album) =

Studio album by Defunkt
- Released: 1988
- Genre: Rock; funk; jazz
- Length: 39:15
- Label: Antilles
- Producer: Gene Kraut

Defunkt chronology
Thermonuclear Sweat (1982)	In America (1988)	Avoid the Funk: A Defunkt Anthology (1988)

In America is an album by the American band Defunkt, released in 1988. The band supported the album with North American and United Kingdom tours.

== Production ==
Trombonist Joseph Bowie began assembling a new lineup of Defunkt in 1985, in New York City. The bandmembers collaborated on the songwriting, a change from previous albums. The album was produced by Gene Kraut, who also served as the band's manager. The title track uses samples of American presidential speeches, particularly those of Richard Nixon. "Eraserhead" is an instrumental. "Spiritual Sponsor" is about how businesses manipulate spiritual concepts to sell products.

== Critical reception ==
Professional ratings
Review scores
Source	Rating
Funk	7/10
MusicHound R&B: The Essential Album Guide	4/5 stars
Omaha World-Herald	4/5 stars
The Philadelphia Inquirer	4/4 stars
The Virgin Encyclopedia of Eighties Music	3/5 stars

The Philadelphia Inquirer noted that "the foundation for the revamped Defunkt ... is Kim Annette Clarke's spandex-style bass, which flits between rumbling bottom and twisted melody lines, and the straightforward drumming of Kenny Martin." The Omaha World-Herald said that the "funky, horn-powered roots rock sizzles under the guidance of bandleader Joseph Bowie". The St. Petersburg Times opined that the band "sounds lean and powerful; unforgiving in its rhythmic urgency; intoxicating with its heady instrumental interplay; bold, cocksure and witty in its social commentary"; the paper later listed the album among the 10 best of 1988.

The Times stated that "weighty slabs of extemporization feature plenty of virtuoso guitar soloing in the 'thermonuclear' tradition by Bill Bickford, broken up by pugnacious horn section interjections and underpinned by rapid-fire funk rhythms." The Macon Telegraph and News concluded that "the drums and bass are more jazz than funk, which really sets Defunkt apart." The Morning Call said that "Defunkt's rhythms are jagged [and] the horn work is smooth".

Trouser Press called the album "a dynamic rock-funk-jazz concoction of popping bass, neck-melting guitar ... and Bowie's inventive trombone figures and up-close-and-personable vocals."

== Track listing ==
In America track listing
No.	Title	Length
1.	"Smooth Love"	5:10
2.	"Eraserhead"	0:40
3.	"A Peace of Mind"	5:18
4.	"In America"	6:34
5.	"Change"	6:03
6.	"Love You from Afar"	4:56
7.	"Tell Me"	3:58
8.	"Spiritual Sponsor"	2:58
9.	"Selfdisclosure"	3:38
Total length:		39:15
