= Orange Fish Tears =

Studio album by Baikida E.J. Carroll
- Released: 1974
- Recorded: June 3–5, 1974
- Studios: Studio Palm, Paris
- Genre: Free jazz
- Labels: Palm; PALM 13

Baikida Carroll chronology
Orange Fish Tears (1974)	The Spoken Word (1979)

Orange Fish Tears is the debut album by trumpeter and composer Baikida Carroll, on which he is joined by saxophonist Oliver Lake, pianist Manuel Villardel, and percussionist Naná Vasconcelos. It was recorded during June 3–5, 1974, at Studio Palm in Paris, during a visit to France by members of the Black Artists Group. The album was initially released on vinyl in 1974 by Palm Records, and was reissued in 2023 in remastered form on vinyl, CD, and as a digital download, by the French label SouffleContinu Records.

== Reception ==
Professional ratings
Review scores
Source	Rating
Tom Hull – on the Web	B+

JJ Skolnik of Bandcamp Daily called the recording "a rich and joyous album that more than deserves its place in the free jazz canon," and wrote: "Orange Fish Tears is perhaps free jazz at its most approachable, but that in no way means that it's any less fiery than the more avant-garde side of things."

The New York City Jazz Record's Duck Baker stated: "As one of the most significant improvising trumpet voices of the past 50 years, it's shocking to realize that Baikida Carroll has only averaged barely one record per decade as a leader... This was a most impressive debut, and it stands the test of time extremely well as a unique gem that amply rewards repeated listening."

Ed Hazell of Point of Departure commented: "the album certainly ranks among the most assured leader debuts in jazz... Carroll emphasizes a collective group approach, careful integration of composition and improvisation, and a fine balance between musical elements... The reissue lets us consider its place among the most innovative and important albums of its day."

Writing for JazzWord, Ken Waxman noted that the album "heralds further explorations," and remarked: "Creation of sound collages as well as whinnying and staccato pivots into pure improvisation and rhythmic asides is what makes Orange Fish Tears a BAG-classic and progenitor of musical currents that would be more fully investigated in the following decades."

== Track listing ==
1. "Orange Fish Tears" (Baikida Carroll) – 8:00
2. "Forest Scorpion" (Baikida Carroll) – 12:06
3. "Rue Roger" (Oliver Lake) – 9:41
4. "Porte D'Orléans" (Baikida Carroll) – 14:15

== Personnel ==
- Baikida Carroll – trumpet, flugelhorn, cowbell, horns, percussion
- Oliver Lake – soprano saxophone, alto saxophone, tenor saxophone, flute, bamboo flute, percussion
- Manuel Villaroel – piano, electric piano, percussion
- Naná Vasconcelos – cuica, tabla, timbales, bells, percussion
