= Whisper of Dharma =

Studio album by Human Arts Ensemble
- Released: 1972
- Recorded: October 6, 1972
- Studio: St. Louis, Missouri
- Genre: Free jazz
- Label: Universal Justice; UJ 103
- Producer: Charles "Bobo" Shaw, James Marshall

Human Arts Ensemble chronology
Whisper of Dharma (1972)	Poem of Gratitude (1973)

Reissue cover

Whisper of Dharma is the debut album by the Human Arts Ensemble, a musical collective that was an offshoot of the St. Louis-based Black Artists Group. Consisting of two 22-minute pieces, it was recorded on October 6, 1972, in St. Louis, and was initially released later that year by the small Universal Justice label. In 1977, it was reissued by Arista/Freedom with different cover art. The album features drummer and group leader Charles "Bobo" Shaw, saxophonists Oliver Lake, J. D. Parran, and James Marshall, trumpeter Floyd LeFlore, trombonist Joseph Bowie, multi-instrumentalist Baikida Carroll, and percussionist Gene Lake, who was six years old at the time of the recording session. On the recording, the musicians supplemented their primary instruments with miscellaneous "small instruments" plus a Tibetan trumpet introduced by Marshall, who had just returned from a trip through India and Nepal.

== Reception ==
Professional ratings
Review scores
Source	Rating
AllMusic	4.5/5 stars
DownBeat	4/5 stars

The editors of AllMusic awarded the album 4½ stars out of a possible 5, while DownBeat awarded it 4 stars out of 5. In the DownBeat review, Will Smith wrote, "Dharma is graceful, slow-developing, quiet and peacefully cool". "Of special interest on Dharma are solo passages featuring the bass clarinet of Parran, the flute solos and duets by Lake and Marshall, the solos and interplay between Parran's and Lake’s sopranos, and snatches of Leflore's muted trumpet".

Coda's Art Lange noted the "extremely gentle and evocative" character of the first track, describing it as a "cool wash of delicate sound" that is "reminiscent of Marion Brown's Afternoon of a Georgia Faun." He called the second track "an aggressive, hot, shouting exhortation of demons... an exhilarating, chaotic celebration with a much denser texture, never turning violent or ugly." In conclusion, he stated: "The success of an ensemble music such as this depends upon a near-telepathic interplay between musicians. That these two performances are so sensitively shaded, colorful, rhythmically balanced, and explosively imagistic is a credit to the musicians involved."

A writer for Musician, Player and Listener commented: "Extraordinary music, collective improvisation of a very high order... On both sides the level of continuity is remarkably high. This is some of the best avant garde jazz I have heard on record. If you've ever played free jazz you'd know how incredibly difficult it is to play it this well."

Author Dennis Owsley called the first track "trance music, slow-moving and elegiac," and praised the "interplay between all of the horns," while noting that, on the second track, "the sonic landscape is so dense that it is difficult to follow."

== Track listing ==
Composed by Charles "Bobo" Shaw and James Marshall.

1. "Whisper of Dharma" – 21:40
2. "A World New" – 21:35

== Personnel ==
- Charles "Bobo" Shaw – drums, small Instruments
- Oliver Lake – tenor saxophone, soprano saxophone, flute, small instruments
- J. D. Parran – tenor saxophone, soprano saxophone, bass clarinet, small instruments
- James Marshall – alto saxophone, Tibetan trumpet, wooden flute
- Floyd LeFlore – trumpet, small instruments
- Joseph Bowie – trombone, congas, small instruments
- Baikida Carroll – gong, small instruments
- Gene Lake – drums, small Instruments
