= Ntu: Point from Which Creation Begins =

Studio album by Oliver Lake
- Released: 1976
- Recorded: 1971
- Studio: St. Louis
- Genre: Free jazz
- Length: 36:16
- Label: Freedom; AL 1024
- Producer: John Hicks

Oliver Lake chronology
Holding Together (1976)	Ntu: Point from Which Creation Begins (1976)	Buster Bee (1978)

Ntu: Point from Which Creation Begins is an album by saxophonist Oliver Lake. It was recorded in St. Louis, Missouri, in 1971, and was released on vinyl in 1976 by Arista's Freedom Records imprint. On the album, Lake is joined by fellow musicians associated with the Black Artists Group: trumpeters Baikida Carroll and Floyd LeFlore, trombonist Joseph Bowie, guitarist Richard Martin, pianists Clovis Bordeux and John Hicks, bassist Don Officer, drummer Charles "Bobo" Shaw, and percussionist Don Moye.

The album was intended to be Lake's debut as a leader, and the saxophonist had planned to use it as the basis for a European tour with the group. However, the small label that intended to issue the recording went out of business, leaving Lake to try to find a record company willing to release it. The album was finally released by Arista/Freedom in 1976 after Lake had moved to New York City following several years in Paris.

According to author Jeff Schwartz, the album title reflects the influence of Janheinz Jahn's book Muntu: African Culture and the Western World, which was widely read by jazz musicians during the 1970s.

== Reception ==
Professional ratings
Review scores
Source	Rating
AllMusic	4/5 stars
Tom Hull – on the Web	A−
The Virgin Encyclopedia of Jazz	4/5 stars
The Rolling Stone Jazz Record Guide	3/5 stars

In a review for AllMusic, Scott Yanow described the music as "quite avant-garde, often very loose and influenced by the Art Ensemble of Chicago," and wrote: "Much of this music is hit and miss, but it has its successful moments."

Dean Minderman of All About Jazz called the album "an historic session," and stated: "the alternating sparse and dense textures and free-form improvisations of Ntu suggest some kinship with the Art Ensemble, but there also are passing resemblances to Sun Ra's Arkestra, the various 'New Thing' recordings by Coltrane, Shepp and others on the Impulse! label, and some of the music Miles Davis was doing around the same time. If you have any interest in this period or style, it's certainly worth hearing for both aesthetic and historic reasons."

Author Benjamin Looker noted the influence of Eric Dolphy on Lake's playing on the album, commenting that he "was carving out angular sonic figures with a newly biting and acerbic tone. Propelling his improvisations with a dextrous command of the full range of the alto, he frequently combined wild, bluesy riffs with madcap intervallic leaps, sometimes anchoring the listener with phrases reminiscent of his bebop hero, Jackie McLean."

== Track listing ==
Side A

1. "Africa" (Oliver Lake) – 12:57
2. "Tse'lane" (Baikida Carroll) – 5:55

Side B

1. "Electric Freedom Colors" (Baikida Carroll, Oliver Lake) – 6:24
2. "Eriee" (Oliver Lake) – 7:40
3. "Zip" (Oliver Lake) – 4:40

== Personnel ==
- Oliver Lake – alto sax, soprano sax, flute
- Baikida Carroll – trumpet
- Floyd LeFlore – trumpet
- Joseph Bowie – trombone
- Richard Martin – guitar
- Clovis Bordeux – electric piano
- John Hicks – piano
- Don Officer – bass
- Charles "Bobo" Shaw – drums
- Don Moye – congas
