= The Flam =

Studio album by Frank Lowe
- Released: 1975
- Recorded: October 20 & 21, 1975 at Generation Sound Studios, New York City
- Genre: Jazz
- Length: 43:37
- Label: Black Saint
- Producer: Giacomo Pellicciotti

Frank Lowe chronology
Fresh (1974)	The Flam (1975)	Tricks of the Trade (1976)

The Flam is an album by American jazz saxophonist Frank Lowe recorded in 1975 for the Italian Black Saint label.

== Reception ==
The Allmusic review by Scott Yanow awarded the album 4½ stars stating "The very explorative and rather emotional music holds one's interest throughout. These often heated performances are better heard than described".

Professional ratings
Review scores
Source	Rating
Allmusic	4.5/5 stars
The Penguin Guide to Jazz Recordings	4/4 stars

== Track listing ==
1. "Sun Voyage" (Joseph Bowie) - 7:35
2. "Flam" (Frank Lowe) - 14:03
3. "Be-Bo-Bo-Be" (Charles Bobo Shaw) - 10:53
4. "Third St. Stomp" (Alex Blake, Joseph Bowie, Frank Lowe, Charles Bobo Shaw, Leo Smith) - 10:21
5. "U.B.O." (Leo Smith) - 0:45

== Personnel ==
- Frank Lowe - tenor saxophone
- Leo Smith - trumpet, flugelhorn, wood flute
- Joseph Bowie - trombone
- Alex Blake - bass, electric bass
- Charles "Bobo" Shaw - drums
