= Dogon A.D. =

Studio album by Julius Hemphill
- Released: 1972
- Recorded: February 1972; Archway Studios, St. Louis
- Genre: Avant-garde jazz
- Label: Freedom
- Producer: Julius Hemphill

Julius Hemphill chronology
Dogon A.D. (1972)	Coon Bid'ness (1975)

Dogon A.D. is an album by saxophonist Julius Hemphill. It was recorded in February 1972 in St. Louis, Missouri, and was initially released on LP in limited quantities later that year by Hemphill's own Mbari Records, a label he created for the express purpose of issuing his own music. The album was reissued on LP by the Freedom label in 1977, and was reissued on CD in 2011, with extra liner notes and reproductions of the artwork from both the Mbari and Freedom releases, by International Phonograph. A fourth track from the recording session, titled "The Hard Blues," and featuring guest saxophonist Hamiet Bluiett, was originally released on Hemphill's 1975 album Coon Bid'ness, and was included as a bonus track on the 2011 reissue of Dogon A.D., bringing together all the music from the session.

The title of the album stems from Hemphill's fascination with the art and culture of the Dogon people of West Africa. "A.D." refers to the Dogon's "adapted dance," in which they modified some of their ceremonies with the goal of presenting them to Western visitors.

According to author Benjamin Looker, several of the musicians who were scheduled to participate in the recording session, fellow members of the Black Artists Group (BAG), failed to show up, leaving Hemphill with a quartet. In addition, some of the recording equipment failed to work properly. Despite these challenges, the group managed to produce what Looker called "an almost accidental classic." He wrote: "that February day in the studio, with the malfunctioning equipment and the truant musicians, stands proxy for the individual creative energy released and replenished by BAG. The Dogon A.D. project turned out to be emblematic of the collective's musical program, embodying both an economic and an aesthetic rejoinder to the era's social and musical challenges."

== Reception ==
Professional ratings
Review scores
Source	Rating
AllMusic	5/5 stars
All About Jazz	5/5 stars
The Absolute Sound	5/5 stars

AllMusic awarded the album 5 stars, and Scott Yanow stated: "This historic album features four then-unknowns on three lengthy avant-garde explorations that were quite influential... This important music is better to be heard than described".

Mike Shanley of Jazz Times commented: "Dogon A.D. suffers from sonic shortcomings inherent in the original tapes, with distortion and static popping up in a few places. Grin and bear it though, because this music is worth it."

In a review for All About Jazz, Troy Collins described the album as an "historic masterpiece," stating that it "is widely considered the missing link between the avant-garde and populist forms such as blues, funk and soul," and writing: "Dogon A.D. is a timeless masterwork culled from the crossroads of African-American music traditions."

Writing for The Absolute Sound, Duck Baker remarked: "Abdul Wadud... could make his axe combine the functions of a jazz bass and a Mississippi Delta guitarist. Drummer Philip Wilson and trumpeter Baikida Carroll fit in perfectly, with the horns blowing long but strongly-rooted solos over Wadud's insistent bass figures and Wilson's spare commentary."

In an article for NPR, Kevin Whitehead referred to Dogon A.D. as "one of the startling jazz recordings of the 1970s, a rethinking of possibilities open to the avant-garde," and commented: "Hemphill made other great albums on his own... But none had quite the impact of Dogon A.D. Almost 40 years later, it's still a revelation."

Burning Ambulance's Phil Freeman stated: "Minor sonic flaws aside, this is a must-own for any fan of jazz's rougher edges. Basically, if you're coming to this site on any kind of regular basis, you need to own this album.

Ed Hazell of Point of Departure stated: "Few albums have ever announced so unequivocally the arrival of a major new talent; it's simply one of the most vital and exciting jazz albums ever recorded... Not only is the playing at a very high level of virtuosity, but Hemphill's concept of the small jazz band betrays serious consideration of the sound, balance, and role of the instruments." Regarding the 2011 reissue, he wrote: "Hearing the complete session on one disc only emphasizes what a historically important date this session is. The album is simply a masterpiece."

== Track listing ==
All compositions by Julius Hemphill

1. "Dogon A.D." – 14:30
2. "Rites" – 8:07
3. "The Painter" – 15:00

Bonus track on 2011 CD reissue

4. "The Hard Blues" – 20:07

== Personnel ==
- Julius Hemphill – alto saxophone, flute
- Baikida E.J. Carroll – trumpet
- Abdul Wadud – cello
- Philip Wilson – drums
- Hamiet Bluiett – baritone saxophone (track 4)

== Production ==
- Oliver Sain – engineer
- Michael Cuscuna, Steve Backer – production co-ordination
- Dennis Pohl – cover art for Freedom release
