= The Spoken Word =

Live album by Baikida Carroll
- Released: 1979
- Recorded: April 22, 1977; April 1, 1978
- Venue: Mapenzi, Berkeley, California
- Genre: Free jazz
- Length: 1:09:05
- Label: Hat Hut; M/N
- Producer: Pia and Werner X. Uehlinger

Baikida Carroll chronology
Orange Fish Tears (1974)	The Spoken Word (1979)	Shadows and Reflections (1982)

The Spoken Word is a live solo album by trumpeter and composer Baikida Carroll. It was recorded on April 22, 1977, and April 1, 1978, at Mapenzi in Berkeley, California, and was released on vinyl in 1979 as a double album by Hat Hut Records, with liner notes by Julius Hemphill.

== Reception ==
Professional ratings
Review scores
Source	Rating
AllMusic	3/5 stars

In a review for DownBeat, John Corbett noted the paucity of solo trumpet albums, and called The Spoken Word "a very special record, extremely approachable, lovely and refreshing." He praised the album's closing tracks, acknowledging Carroll's "beautiful, radiant tone," and "measured, phrase-by-phrase introspection," and writing: "With crickets in the background laying a pulse bed, Carroll plays gentle, sweet and sour melodies, adding Harmon mute, then bathing his soft calls in reverb."

A writer for Coda commented: "this music affirms Carroll's roots in the blues tradition, whether evoking speech patterns through his trumpet mouthpiece... or offering florid, heavily ornamented flurries of notes occasionally volatile in their urgency... The lack of supporting rhythm section or alternate solo voices creates an arhythmic pulse sculpted out of air."

== Track listing ==
Composed by Baikida Carroll.

Disc 1

1. "The Spoken Word I" – 17:05
2. "The Spoken Word II" – 14:30

Disc 2

1. "Third Image" – 15:15
2. "Rites and Rituals" – 11:50
3. "Double Rainbow Forest" – 10:25

Disc 1 recorded live on April 22, 1977; disc 2 recorded live on April 1, 1978. Both discs recorded at Mapenzi, Berkeley, California.

== Personnel ==
- Baikida Carroll – trumpet, flugelhorn, prepared trumpet
