= African Children =

Studio album by Lester Bowie
- Released: 1978
- Recorded: April 16, 1978
- Genre: Jazz
- Label: Horo
- Producer: Aldo Sinesio

Lester Bowie chronology
Rope-A-Dope (1976)	African Children (1978)	Duet (1978)

African Children is a double LP by Lester Bowie recorded for the Italian Horo label and released in 1978. It features performances by Bowie, Arthur Blythe, Amina Claudine Myers, Malachi Favors and Phillip Wilson.

== Track listing ==
Side one

1. "Amina" (Bowie, Blythe, Myers, Favors, Wilson) – 19:28

Side two

1. "Captain Courageous" -10:40
2. "Tricky Slicky" (Bowie, Blythe, Myers, Favors, Wilson) – 10:32

Side three

1. "Chili MacDonald (Bowie, Blythe, Myers, Favors, Wilson) – 20:00

Side four

1. "For Fela" – 20:16

All compositions by Lester Bowie except as indicated

  - Recorded on April 16, 1978, at Mama Dog Studio, Rome, Italy

== Personnel ==
- Lester Bowie – trumpet
- Arthur Blythe – alto saxophone
- Amina Claudine Myers – piano, vocals
- Malachi Favors – bass
- Phillip Wilson – drums
