= Many Faces of Death, Vol. III =

Studio album by Detroit's Most Wanted
- Released: March 29, 1993
- Recorded: 1992–1993
- Length: 57:44
- Labels: Ichiban Records, Bryant Records
- Producers: Gangsta Pat, Kid Money, Motsi Ski, Joel H. Bryant, Jr. (Exec.)

Detroit's Most Wanted chronology
Tricks Of The Trade, Vol. II: The Money is Made (1992)	Many Faces of Death, Vol. III (1993)	Bow The Fuck Down (1994)

Professional ratings
Review scores
Source	Rating
AllMusic	2.5/5 stars

Many Faces of Death, Vol. III is the third album by Detroit rap group Detroit's Most Wanted. Legalize It and Keep Holding On were released as singles. The song I Never Had a Good Day is a response to Ice Cube's hit single It Was a Good Day from the previous year. Shortly before the release of this album, The group would break up due to a conflict of interest as MC Hammer wanted to sign DMW to his label Bust It Records but was prevented from doing so only by group leader Motsi Ski who would turn down the offer after disapproving of Hammer's plans for the group which would've involved a name change and a toning down of the group's lyrics. MC Lee and DJ Duncan Hines would leave DMW to go sign with Hammer on Bust It Records, Causing Motsi Ski to be the only remaining member left in the group. This would be the final album as a group effort by DMW until the 2004 bonus disc of the Special Anniversary Edition of Tricks Of The Trade, Vol. II: The Money is Made.

== Critical response ==
Ron Wynn of Allmusic wrote: With gangsta rap a dominant trend in 1990s hip-hop, acts that break from the pack are those able to tell their stories with conviction and flair. Detroit's Most Wanted didn't on this occasion, and the litany of violent incidents, coupled with an assortment of come-ons, sexist putdowns, and so on, reduced this to just another day at the rap office.

== Track listing ==
1. "Ratt Trapp"
2. "Had to Buck Em Down"
3. "Off the Hook"
4. "Legalize It"
5. "Deeper Than the Underground"
6. "Back on My Block"
7. "Trying to Get Over"
8. "Keep Holding On"
9. "I Never Had a Good Day"
10. "What Truly Is a Mack"
11. "Back on My Block" (Instrumental)
