= Blue Boyé =

Studio album by Julius Hemphill
- Released: 1977
- Recorded: January 1977
- Studio: Mayhew Street Studios, Larchmont, New York
- Genre: Free jazz
- Length: 1:22:44
- Label: Mbari; MPC 1000X
- Producer: Julius Hemphill

Julius Hemphill chronology
Coon Bid'ness (1975)	Blue Boyé (1977)	Roi Boyé & the Gotham Minstrels (1977)

CD reissue cover

Blue Boyé is a solo album by Julius Hemphill. It was recorded at Mayhew Street Studios in Larchmont, New York, during January 1977, and was released on vinyl by Hemphill's own Mbari label later that year as a two-LP set. In 1998, it was reissued on CD by Tim Berne's Screwgun Records. On the album, which features eight original compositions, Hemphill performs all instrumental parts via overdubbing, and is heard on alto saxophone, soprano saxophone, flute, and percussion.

== Reception ==
Professional ratings
Review scores
Source	Rating
AllMusic	4.5/5 stars
The Penguin Guide to Jazz	3/4 stars

In a review for AllMusic, Thom Jurek wrote: "Blue Boyé is a singular album, born of equal parts inspiration, determination, and artistry. It should be heard by virtually everyone interested in Hemphill to be sure, but not exclusively."

Robert Palmer of The New York Times noted that "not everything works," but stated: "the music is most interesting when Hemphill re-examines traditional forms such as Kansas City swing and the spiritual, subjecting them to modern harmonic and rhythmic treatments without jeopardizing their idiomatic integrity."

Author Gary Giddins singled out the ten-bar blues "Kansas City Line" for praise, commenting: "at the end of every chorus you feel as if he might go over a cliff, but he always grabs the tonic in time... he descries the spirit and fiber of [Charlie] Parker without reiterating his actual phrases, an effect achieved by muting notes and twisting figures that are almost but not quite generic."

Writing for JazzTimes, Amiri Baraka remarked: "Hemphill's playing, self-consciously cerebral, sometimes to a fault, the tart, incisive tone, the richness and whimsicality of his improvisation, give a cutting edge of excitement to his work. In retrospect, it is easy to see how influential... Hemphill's work remains, certainly as a model for many of the 'off shore' avants."

In an article for All About Jazz, Mike Neely wrote: "Not only is it a quirky portrait of an American master early in his career, but it is also startling jazz... Soulful, bluesy, subtle, and complex are adjectives I associate with Hemphill and this wonderful disc set only deepens my admiration for one of the truly neglected figures of modern jazz."

CMJ New Music Report's Tad Hendrickson stated: "the songs have a soulful, orchestral-like quality that keeps in close touch with the blues. Horns weave in and out to play melody and counter-melody in a joyful musical dance that lends real insight into the mind of this musical genius."

== Track listing ==
Composed by Julius Hemphill.

1. "Countryside" – 10:07
2. "Hotend" – 12:30
3. "OK Rubberband" – 9:23
4. "Antecedent" – 8:16
5. "Kansas City Line" – 8:43
6. "C.M.E." – 11:31
7. "Dirty Row" – 7:52
8. "Homeboy Tootin' at the Dog/Star" – 9:11

== Personnel ==
- Julius Hemphill – alto saxophone, soprano saxophone, flute, percussion
