= Palm Records =

French jazz record label

Palm Records (short for Productions Artistiques Littéraires et Musicales) was a French jazz record label founded by Jef Gilson in the early 1970s.

== Discography ==
- PALM 1: Gilson Malagasy 1972
- PALM 2: Jef Gilson / Jean-Charles Capon / Gilbert Rovere / Jean-Luc Ponty / Lionel Maga Concert À La M.J.C. Colombes 1972
- PALM 3: Christian Vander / Frank Raholison Fiesta In Drums 1973
- PALM 4: Sylvain Marc / Del Rabenja Madagascar Now – Maintenant 'Zao 1973
- PALM 5: Gilson Malagasy At Newport-Paris 1973
- PALM 6: Christian Vander Christian Vander Et Les 3 Jef
- PALM 7: Philippe Maté / Jef Gilson Workshop 1973
- PALM 8: Byard Lancaster / Sylvain Marc / Steve McCall Us 1974
- PALM 9: Byard Lancaster – Clint Jackson III Mother Africa 1974
- PALM 10: Khan Jamal Give The Vibes Some 1974
- PALM 11/12: Byard Lancaster / Keno Speller Exactement
- PALM 13: Baikida Carroll Orange Fish Tears 1974
- PALM 16: Machi Oul Quetzalcoatl 1975
- PALM 17: Jacques Thollot Watch Devil Go 1975
- PALM 18: Jef Gilson Anthology Jef Gilson 1945/1975 : The Beginning Of Jef Gilson 1975
- PALM 20: Jef Gilson Anthology Jef Gilson 1945/1975 : The Big Band Era 1975
- PALM 22: François Jeanneau Une Bien Curieuse Planète 1975
- PALM 23: François Couturier / André Jaume / Fred Ramamonjiarisoa Nadja / Salana-Resaka 1975
- PALM 24: Raymond Boni Rêve En Couleurs 1976
- PALM 25: Frank Lowe The Other Side 1977
- PALM 26: Jean-Charles Capon / Philippe Maté / Butch Morris / Serge RahoersonUntitled 1977
- PALM 27: Jean Peron Garvanoff Boogie Woogie Blues 1977
- PALM 28: L. "Butch" Morris / J.L. Chautemps / F. Jeanneau / A. Jaume / Ph. Maté / A. Hatot / M. Richard / J.C. Capon / J. Gilson / P.Y. Sorin / G. BrownEuropamerica 1977
- PALM 29: Siracusa – Jaume – Boni Nommo - Dans Le Caprice Amer Des Sables 1976
- PALM 30: André Jaume Le Collier De La Colombe 1977
- PALM 31: David Murray Organic Saxophone 1978
- PALM 32: David S. Ware featuring Jean-Charles Capon From Silence To Music 1978
