= Fast Last! =

Studio album by Lester Bowie
- Released: 1974
- Recorded: September 1974
- Genre: Jazz
- Length: 42:46
- Label: Muse
- Producer: Michael Cuscuna

Lester Bowie chronology
Gittin' to Know Y'All (1970)	Fast Last! (1974)	Rope-A-Dope (1976)

Fast Last! is an album by trumpeter Lester Bowie, recorded for the Muse label and released in 1974. It features performances by Bowie, Julius Hemphill, John Hicks, John Stubblefield, Joseph Bowie, Bob Stewart, Cecil McBee, Jerome Cooper, Charles Shaw and Phillip Wilson.

== Reception ==
The AllMusic review by Scott Yanow stated, "As is often true of a Lester Bowie record, this set has surprising moments and a liberal use of absurd humor, along with some fine playing... A fine introduction to Lester Bowie's diverse music".

Professional ratings
Review scores
Source	Rating
AllMusic	4/5 stars
The Rolling Stone Jazz Record Guide	4/5 stars

The duo recording of "Hello Dolly" with Hicks "recalls [Louis] Armstrong's acclaimed version of 'Dear Old Southland' with Buck Washington on piano (Apr. 5, 1930) and thus illustrates Bowie's interest in connecting his avant-garde trumpeting with Armstrong's lyrical tone."

== Track listing ==
1. "Lonely Woman" (Coleman) - 5:15
2. "Banana Whistle" - 9:48
3. "Hello Dolly" (Herman) - 5:00
4. "Fast Last/C" - 12:55
5. "F Troop Rides Again" - 9:38

All compositions by Lester Bowie except as indicated

- Recorded September 1974 at C.I. Recording Studios

== Personnel ==
- Lester Bowie – trumpet (all tracks) and flugelhorn (track 4)
- Julius Hemphill – alto saxophone (tracks 1, 2 & 4), arrangements (track 1)
- John Hicks – piano (tracks 1, 2, 3 & 4)
- John Stubblefield – tenor saxophone (tracks 1 & 2)
- Joseph Bowie – trombone (tracks 1 & 2)
- Bob Stewart – tuba (tracks 1 & 2)
- Cecil McBee – bass (tracks 1, 2 & 4)
- Phillip Wilson – drums (tracks 1, 2, 4 & 5)
- Jerome Cooper – drums (track 5)
- Charles Shaw – drums (track 5)
