= By Myself (Abdul Wadud album) =

Studio album by Abdul Wadud
- Released: 1978
- Recorded: 1977
- Studio: Blank Tape Studios, New York City
- Genre: Free improvisation
- Label: Bisharra Records; BR/101
- Producer: Abdul Wadud

Abdul Wadud chronology
| By Myself (1978) | Live in New York (1978) |

By Myself is a solo cello album by Abdul Wadud. It was recorded during 1977 at Blank Tape Studios in New York City, and was released on vinyl in 1978 by Wadud's Bisharra Records, the label's sole release. In 2023, after being out of print for years, the album was reissued in remastered form by Gotta Groove Records, with assistance from mastering engineer Paul Blakemore, and with the approval of Wadud, who died in 2022.

In the album liner notes, Wadud stated that the recording is "dedicated to my parents and Mother Africa. For if it were not for them I would not be able to speak the Music the way I speak it." In a 2014 interview, he described what led him to record a solo album: "At that time people were doing that... We branched off and people were expressing themselves that way [with solo recordings]. So, I wanted to do one for the cello as well... [it] was definitely a self-produced situation. I had offers to do it with some labels, but I wanted to do it myself and have control of what I was doing." Concerning the music, he recalled that he "approached the cello not in the lyrical sense that it was known for. I had a percussive approach at times, chordal approach, as well as linear approach and tried to incorporate all of that depending on the situation and the demands of the music at that time."

== Critical reception ==
Professional ratings
Review scores
| Source | Rating |
|---|---|
| AllMusic | 3/5 stars |
| The Rolling Stone Jazz Record Guide | 4/5 stars |
| DownBeat | 4/5 stars |

In an article for The New York Times, Jon Pareles wrote: "Wadud projects all the physicality of his instrument. He makes the cello sound like an assemblage of tense catgut and wood, vibrating to a plunk or a twang or sustained moan." He praised the track titled "Expansions," noting that it "puts the cello through all the string-snapping, bow-twisting exertions called for in Bela Bartok's string quartets, while he also shows his connection to the stringed-instrument tradition in African music, such as the Dagomba music of Ghana." NYT writer Hank Shteamer stated that the album's "holistic sound drew on [Wadud's] extensive experiences in both jazz and classical, as well as the rich array of Black music he absorbed growing up in Cleveland in the 1950s, and influences from... Mother Africa."

Writing for The Rolling Stone Jazz Record Guide, Fred Goodman noted that "as soon as Wadud picks up his instrument, class is in session," and commented: "A dynamic soloist, Wadud can cover a lot of ground. By turns percussive, rhythmic and melodic, he is a leader among the handful of cellists presently working in jazz."

Jon Dale of Fact Magazine wrote: "By Myself... comes across as [Wadud's] finest moment, a series of plangent, melancholic pieces for solo cello... a record this stunning needs to reach new ears."

The Hum's Bradford Bailey described the album as "an incredibly honest record with few equivalents" and "pure unmediated creativity and art." He remarked: "There are very few albums of solo improvisations that achieve the heights of Wadud's gesture on By Myself. It's endlessly surprising and moving, with a range and ease which is astounding. A singular statement of individuality, drawing from the broad cultural legacies of the American diaspora."

Commenting for Bandcamp Daily, Bret Sjerven called the album "groundbreaking," stating that it "would spotlight the incredible things Wadud could do on the cello," and pondering: "while By Myself stands as a testament to Wadud's vision and improvisatory gifts, it's hard not to wonder how he might have followed it."

Reed Jackson of Spectrum Culture described By Myself as "if not one of the great solo debuts in jazz history, what was most definitely the greatest album for solo jazz cello ever recorded," and praised "the freshness and innovative daring of the music." He stated: "By Myself... is as bold and free-thinking as you'd expect an album for jazz cello to be... It feels reductive to call By Myself a work of radical synthesis, even though its melding of classical, jazz and even funk elements is extraordinary... But to focus on its technical accomplishment is to shortchange its startling emotional directness, its ability to connect, using uncommon methods and unheard-of techniques, with the things that bind us all together."

In a review for In Sheep's Clothing Hi-Fi, Randall Roberts noted that the album is "the kind of record that will hush a crowded room and quiet the chatter overwhelming your inner thoughts," and concluded: "Wadud's record is unlike anything before or after it."

Chip Stern gave the album 4 stars in his DownBeat review. Stern noted, "The music on By Myself is cyclical in form, not conforming to song form patterns, but rather using freely associated motifs to tell a story. Much of Wadud’s attention is devoted to the pizzacato aspects of the cello, relating his instrument to Delta bluesman, and even farther back, to the oud players of North Africa".

== Tributes from other musicians ==
George E. Lewis's composition "Not Alone" (2014–15), issued on the album The Recombinant Trilogy (New Focus, 2021), is a response to Wadud's album. Lewis commented: "Using techniques of his own design, Wadud transforms the instrument into a blues guitar, a percussion instrument, and much more. In 'Not Alone', however, the cellist is always accompanied by a digitized response that is sometimes only tangentially related to its acoustic origin."

In 2022, drummer Tom Skinner released an album titled Voices of Bishara, paying tribute to Wadud's recording, which Skinner listened to frequently during the COVID-19 lockdown.

In a New York Times article titled "5 Minutes That Will Make You Love the Cello," cellist Tomeka Reid singled out the track titled "Camille" for praise, and wrote: "I love the freedom and creativity in his playing. He uses the whole range of the cello and moves between lyrical, free playing and groove with ease, something I strive to do in my own work. He's definitely a cellist I wish not only more cellists knew about, but also more people in general."

Pianist and composer Ethan Iverson stated: "There must be a few other solo cello jazz/improv records out there, but the masterpiece is surely By Myself, which is actually one of the most friendly and listenable of all avant jazz solo recitals on any instrument."

Cellist Lori Goldston called the album "incredible," noting that it "had a huge impact on me and the improvising cellists of my generation." She commented: "So much integrity, warmth and intelligence, it deserves to be heard more broadly."

Bassist and guimbri player Joshua Abrams remarked: "Hearing this record made me reconsider how I approach the bass. The range of sounds, emotions and ideas on the album is astonishing... Somehow Wadud's virtuosity does not overshadow all the music he's playing. If I had more time I'd start a fan club."

== Track listing ==
All compositions by Abdul Wadud.

1. "Oasis" – 6:57
2. "Kaleidoscope" – 5:40
3. "Camille" – 5:30
4. "Expansions" – 7:40
5. "In a Breeze" – 5:20
6. "Happiness" – 5:30

== Personnel ==
- Abdul Wadud – cello
