= Culmination (album) =

Studio album by Sam Rivers' Rivbea All-star Orchestra
- Released: 1999
- Recorded: September 28–29, 1998
- Studio: Systems Two Recording Studio, Brooklyn, New York
- Genre: Jazz
- Length: 59:31
- Label: BMG France; 74321-68311-2
- Producer: Steve Coleman, Sam Rivers, Sophia Wong

Sam Rivers chronology
Inspiration (1999)	Culmination (1999)	Firestorm (2002)

Culmination is an album by multi-instrumentalist and composer Sam Rivers. It was recorded during September 1998 at Systems Two Recording Studio in Brooklyn, New York, at the same sessions that yielded the album Inspiration, and was released in 1999 by BMG France. On the album, Rivers is joined by members of the Rivbea All-star Orchestra: saxophonists Greg Osby, Steve Coleman, Chico Freeman, Gary Thomas, and Hamiet Bluiett, trumpeters Baikida Carroll, James Zollar, Ralph Alessi, and Ravi Best, trombonists Art Baron, Joseph Bowie, and Ray Anderson, baritone horn player Joseph Daley, tubist Bob Stewart, bassist Doug Mathews, and drummer Anthony Cole.

== Reception ==
Professional ratings
Review scores
Source	Rating
AllMusic	4.5/5 stars
The Penguin Guide to Jazz	3/4 stars
Tom Hull – on the Web	B+

The album was nominated for "Best Large Jazz Ensemble Album" at the 43rd Annual Grammy Awards.

In a review for AllMusic, Scott Yanow wrote: "The music, which is frequently atonal, has so much going on at times that it will take several listens to comprehend everything... [it] is remarkable in ways and well worth acquiring by free jazz collectors."

Mark Corroto of All About Jazz stated that Rivers' "six-to thirteen-minute big band songs are wondrous treats. By shortening the solos and compacting the arrangements he seems to be bringing 'pop' hits back to the jazz orchestra." AAJ's David Adler commented: "You can practically hear the 70s loft scene come to life as Rivers and the other strong soloists on this record... take turns navigating the atonal contours of these compositions. Yet another elliptically eloquent statement from Rivers, one of the most refreshingly radical improvisers of our time."

Writing for JazzTimes, Larry Appelbaum noted that the album "is likely to end up on many year-end best-of lists," and remarked: "Though many of the densely textured pieces have similar tempos and dynamics, they are all rhythmically and harmonically adventurous... Just about everyone in this 16-piece orchestra is a leader, so it’s no surprise that Rivers is generous with the solo space... It's clear that, at age 77, Sam Rivers shows no signs of slowing down."

== Track listing ==
All tracks composed by Sam Rivers.

1. "Spectrum" – 7:22
2. "Bubbles" – 8:27
3. "Revelation" – 10:36
4. "Culmination" – 8:12
5. "Ripples" – 13:38
6. "Neptune" – 5:53
7. "Riffin'" – 6:26

== Personnel ==
- Sam Rivers – soprano saxophone, tenor saxophone, flute
- Greg Osby – alto saxophone
- Steve Coleman – alto saxophone
- Chico Freeman – tenor saxophone
- Gary Thomas – tenor saxophone
- Hamiet Bluiett – baritone saxophone
- Baikida Carroll – trumpet
- James Zollar – trumpet
- Ralph Alessi – trumpet
- Ravi Best – trumpet
- Art Baron – trombone
- Joseph Bowie – trombone
- Ray Anderson – trombone
- Joseph Daley – baritone horn
- Bob Stewart – tuba
- Doug Mathews – bass
- Anthony Cole – drums
