= Coon Bid'ness =

Studio album by Julius Hemphill
- Released: 1975
- Recorded: January 29, 1975; C.I. Studios, New York City except "The Hard Blues" February 1972
- Genre: Jazz, avant-garde jazz
- Length: 42:36
- Label: Arista
- Producer: Michael Cuscuna

Julius Hemphill chronology
Dogon A.D. (1972)	Coon Bid'ness (1975)	Blue Boyé (1977)

Coon Bid'ness is an album released by Julius Hemphill in 1975 on Arista featuring performances by Hemphill, Baikida Carroll, Abdul Wadud, Phillip Wilson, Arthur Blythe, Barry Altschul and Daniel Zebulon. The final track, "The Hard Blues," was recorded at the same recording session as Hemphill's debut album Dogon A.D.. After Hemphill's death in 1995, Freedom Records re-released the album as a CD under the name Reflections.

Regarding the album title, Hemphill recalled: "This was '75, and the title is a reference to minstrel shows. That's a reference to music and an era in which blacks had flowered a little bit. They used to call them coon shows, and stuff. And so I was just getting in some bicentennial licks."

In 2011, writer Greg Tate and musician LaTasha N. Nevada Diggs launched a print on demand magazine titled Coon Bidness, named after the Hemphill album.

== Reception ==
Professional ratings
Review scores
Source	Rating
AllMusic	4.5/5 stars
The Rolling Stone Jazz & Blues Album Guide	4/5 stars
The Virgin Encyclopedia of Jazz	3/5 stars

The editors of AllMusic awarded the album 4½ stars, and reviewer Scott Yanow wrote: "The music throughout is quite avant-garde but differs from the high-energy jams of the 1960s due to its emphasis on building improvisations as a logical outgrowth from advanced compositions. It's well worth several listens.".

Writer Richard Williams stated that, on "The Hard Blues," "Hemphill seemed to have fused the harsh, elemental sound of John Lee Hooker, the warmth and colour of an Ellington small group and the collective exuberance of a Mingus ensemble into something that pointed a way to the future."

Critic Gary Giddins also praised "The Hard Blues," commenting: "How startlingly fresh that music remains: the sinuous, sensuous, riveting directness of his blues is at once fiercely elemental and engagingly modern."

Musician Henry Kuntz noted that the first four tracks (Side A of the LP) function "as a single composition," and suggested that "Hemphill... likes to work with several layers of sound, to slowly take them apart – to the point of near dissolution – then to put them back together again (though not necessarily the same as they were before)." He remarked: "In the U.S., it seems, the Seventies have been more a period of consolidation rather than of innovation (as if the advances of the last decade had to be justified before being built upon)... Hemphill's album offers music of this sort, and it's recommended."

== Track listing ==
All tracks by Julius Hemphill

1. "Reflections" – 2:30
2. "Lyric" – 7:24
3. "Skin, No. 1" – 10:07
4. "Skin, No. 2" – 2:28
5. "The Hard Blues" – 20:07

== Personnel ==
Tracks 1–4:

- Julius Hemphill – alto saxophone, flute
- Arthur Blythe – alto saxophone
- Hamiet Bluiett – baritone saxophone
- Abdul Wadud – cello
- Barry Altschul – drums
- Daniel Zebulon – congas

Track 5:

- Julius Hemphill – alto saxophone, flute
- Baikida Carroll – trumpet
- Hamiet Bluiett – baritone saxophone
- Abdul Wadud – cello
- Phillip Wilson – drums
