= Roi Boyé & the Gotham Minstrels =

Studio album by Julius Hemphill
- Released: 1977
- Recorded: November 1976; March 1977
- Studio: Matthew Studios, Larchmont, New York; Thunder Sound, Toronto, Ontario, Canada
- Genre: Free jazz
- Length: 1:31:02
- Label: Sackville; 3014/15
- Producer: Julius Hemphill

Julius Hemphill chronology
Blue Boyé (1977)	Roi Boyé & the Gotham Minstrels (1977)	Raw Materials and Residuals (1978)

Roi Boyé & the Gotham Minstrels is a solo album by Julius Hemphill. Billed as an "audiodrama," it was recorded at Matthew Studios in Larchmont, New York, during November 1976, and at Thunder Sound in Toronto during March 1977, and was released on vinyl by Sackville Records in 1977 as a two-LP set. In 2001, it was reissued on CD in limited quantities as part of the Sackville Collection series. On the album, Hemphill performs all instrumental parts via overdubbing, and is heard on alto saxophone, soprano saxophone, and flute.

== Reception ==
Professional ratings
Review scores
Source	Rating
AllMusic	3/5 stars
The Penguin Guide to Jazz	3.5/4 stars

In a review for AllMusic, Michael G. Nastos described the album as "Psycho-theater drama in the form of the free African-American creative-jazz movement at its height."

The authors of The Penguin Guide to Jazz Recordings called the album "a classic," stating that it "is enough in itself to guarantee Hemphill a place among the major figures of the last 50 years." They wrote: "it is an aural evocation of New York City and more abstractly a brilliant exercise in the integration of reed voices... Hemphill's three voices... weave together into a single musical personality."

Seymour Wright of The Wire commented: "Hemphill's words and instrumental voices meld whisper, hum, bark and intone long, slow (polemic) reflection... Across Roi Boyé's four sides unfold a reflection on Gotham (New York) that rewards repeated, patient listening... It is a meticulous, resourceful visionary music."

Rock Salted's Syd Fablo remarked: "A one-of-a-kind sound... The music melds a flamboyant dramatic sense from musical theater and vaudeville with the techniques and improvisational choices of free jazz, tinged just slightly with blues and R&B influences... The theatrical aspects of this help hold it together."

== Track listing ==
Composed by Julius Hemphill.

Disc 1

1. "Roi Boyé & the Gotham Minstrels" – 24:00
2. "Roi Boyé & the Gotham Minstrels" – 22:16

Disc 2

1. "Roi Boyé & the Gotham Minstrels" – 22:41
2. "Roi Boyé & the Gotham Minstrels" – 21:46

== Personnel ==
- Julius Hemphill – alto saxophone, soprano saxophone, flute
