= Defunkt =

American band

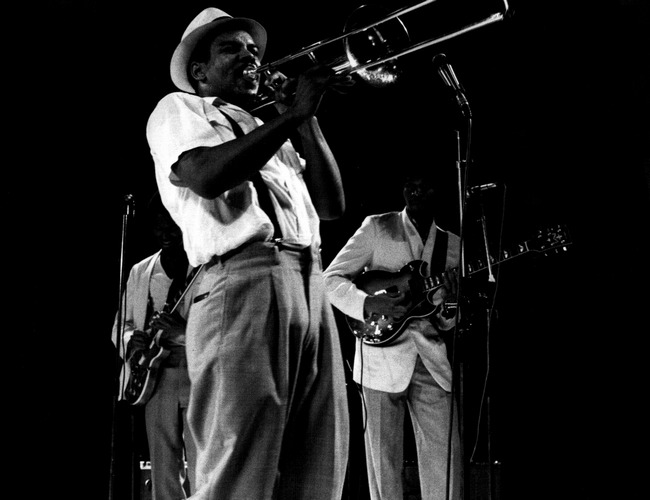
- Defunkt in 1981

Background information
- Origin: New York City, U.S.
- Genres: Jazz fusion; punk jazz; dance-punk; avant-funk; experimental
- Years active: 1978–present
- Members: Joseph Bowie; Kim Clarke; Ronnie Drayton; Bill Bickford; John Mulkerin; Kenny Martin
- Past members: Full list
- Website: josephbowie.com

Defunkt is an American musical group founded by the trombonist and singer Joseph Bowie in 1978 in New York City. Their music touches on elements of punk rock, funk, and jazz.

== History ==
Joseph Bowie is the brother of big band musician Byron Bowie and Art Ensemble of Chicago co-founder Lester Bowie. Joseph, who had previously worked as a sideman for various 1970s jazz musicians, founded Defunkt in 1978 with members of a band that had backed James Chance. The new group's original focus was on danceable jazz music. Joseph Bowie remains the only consistent member of the group over its history; he has been noted for displaying the influence of far-ranging musicians like Ornette Coleman, James Brown, and Joe Strummer.

The first incarnation of the group was active in New York City's "No Wave" radical underground music scene, which also included fusion-oriented groups like Material and Sonic Youth. Joseph's saxophonist brother Byron, bassist Melvin Gibbs and future Living Colour guitarist Vernon Reid were early contributors. The group's debut self-titled album was released in 1980 and combined the band's original jazz focus with soul, funk, rock, and blues. That album was particularly popular in Eastern Europe and Japan. Their second album Thermonuclear Sweat followed in 1982.

Bowie disbanded the group in 1983 due to a lack of mainstream success, and retired to the island of St. Croix for a few years. He returned to New York in 1986 and assembled a new Defunkt lineup, with the addition of multiple singers and a large horn section to pursue a new focus on combining 1930s big band and swing music with 1970s funk. This incarnation of the group, with many lineup changes under Bowie's leadership, has released several additional studio albums, starting with In America in 1988. Their latest album, Mastervolt, was released in 2015.

== Musical style ==
AllMusic described the Defunkt's music as "some of the most adventurous sounds of the last quarter of the 20th century." Trouser Press has praised the group's later works for "a dynamic rock-funk-jazz concoction of popping bass, neck-melting guitar [...] and Bowie's inventive trombone figures and up-close-and-personable vocals."

== Discography ==
- Defunkt (1980)
- The Razor's Edge (12"-Maxi-Single, 1981)
- Thermonuclear Sweat (1982)
- In America (1988)
- Avoid the Funk: a Defunkt Anthology (Compilation, 1988)
- Heroes (1990)
- Live at the Knitting Factory (Live, 1991)
- Crisis (1992)
- Cum Funky (1993)
- Live and Reunified (Live, 1993)
- A Blues Tribute to Muddy Waters and Jimi Hendrix (1994)
- One World (1995)
- Defunkt live in Stuttgart (Live, 1996)
- The Legend of Defunkt, Volume 1 (Compilation, 2001)
- Defunkt – The Legend Continues (2001)
- Defunkt Live in Europe (Live-Doppelalbum, 2002)
- Journey (2004)
- Defunkt + Thermonuclear Sweat (2005)
- Mastervolt (2015)
- Live at Channel Zero (2016)

== Members ==
=== Current ===
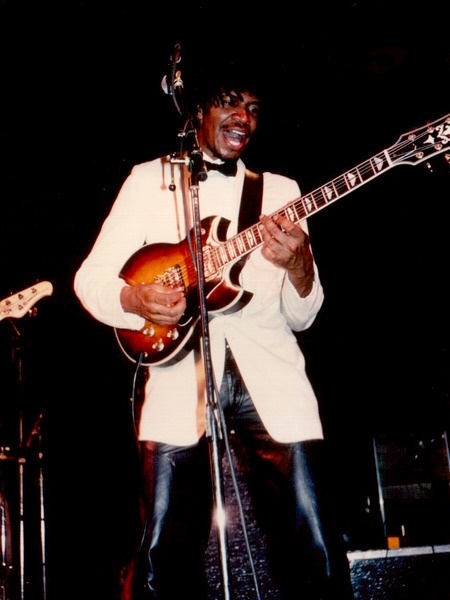
Kelvyn Bell

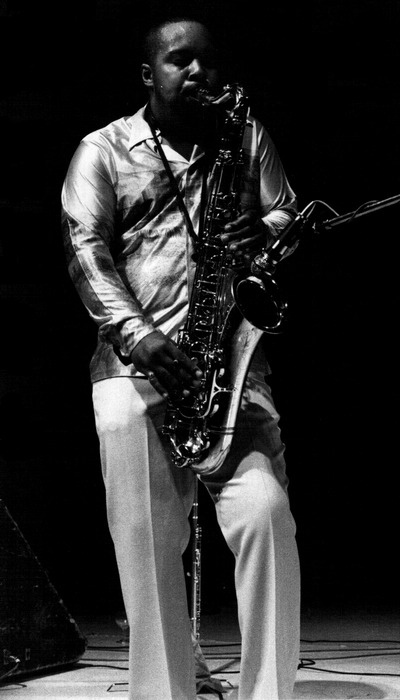
Byron Bowie

- Joseph Bowie – trombone, vocals
- Kim Clarke – bass
- Bill Bickford – guitar
- John Mulkerin – trumpet
- Kenny Martin – drums

=== Former ===
- Ronny Drayton – guitar
- Kelvyn Bell – guitar
- Ayodele Maakheru (Martin Aubert) – guitar
- Vernon Reid – guitar
- Richard Martin – guitar
- Rocco Zifarelli - guitar
- Melvin Gibbs – bass
- Ron Mac Jenkins – bass
- Reggie Washington – bass
- Ted Daniels – trumpet
- Byron Bowie – saxophone
- Luther Thomas – saxophone
- Charles Green – saxophone
- Alex Harding – baritone saxophone
- Ronnie Burrage – drums
- Rishard Lampese – guitar
- Skoota Warner – drums
- Tobias Ralph – drums
- Kahil El'Zabar – percussion
- Kelli Sae – vocals
- Martin Fischer – keyboards
- Marcus Persiani – keyboards
- Kevin Bents – keyboards
- Bahnamous Bowie – keyboards
- Adam Klipple – keyboards
- Cliff Branch – keyboards
