= Flat-Out Jump Suite =

Studio album by Julius Hemphill
- Released: 1980
- Recorded: June 4 & 5, 1980
- Genre: Jazz
- Length: 41:24
- Label: Black Saint
- Producer: Giovanni Bonandrini

Julius Hemphill chronology
Live in New York (1978)	Flat-Out Jump Suite (1980)	Georgia Blue (1984)

Flat-Out Jump Suite is an album by jazz saxophonist Julius Hemphill, recorded in 1980 for the Italian Black Saint label.

== Reception ==
Professional ratings
Review scores
Source	Rating
AllMusic	3/5 stars
The Penguin Guide to Jazz	4/4 stars
The Rolling Stone Jazz Record Guide	3/5 stars

The authors of The Penguin Guide to Jazz selected the recording as part of its suggested Core Collection, and called it "a remarkably quiet album that requires some concentration.".

The editors of AllMusic awarded the album 3 stars, and reviewer Brian Olewnick called it "a solid set from a quartet of fine musicians".

== Track listing ==
All compositions by Julius Hemphill

1. "Ear" - 8:54
2. "Mind (1st Part)" - 12:25
3. "Mind (2nd Part)" - 3:17
4. "Heart" - 9:50
5. "Body" - 6:58
  - Recorded at Barigozzi Studio in Milano, Italy on June 4 & 5, 1980

== Personnel ==
- Julius Hemphill - flute, tenor saxophone
- Olu Dara - trumpet
- Abdul Wadud - cello
- Warren Smith - percussion
