= Buster Bee =

Studio album by Oliver Lake and Julius Hemphill
- Released: 1978
- Recorded: March 1, 1978
- Studio: Eastern Sound, Toronto
- Genre: Free jazz
- Length: 45:43
- Label: Sackville; 3018
- Producer: Bill Smith

Oliver Lake chronology
Ntu: Point from Which Creation Begins (1976)	Buster Bee (1978)	Life Dance of Is (1978)

Julius Hemphill chronology
Raw Materials and Residuals (1978)	Buster Bee (1978)	Live in New York (1978)

Buster Bee is an album by saxophonists Oliver Lake and Julius Hemphill. Featuring three compositions by each musician, it was recorded at Eastern Sound in Toronto, on March 1, 1978, and was released on vinyl by Sackville Records later that year. In 2001, it was reissued on CD in limited quantities as part of the Sackville Collection series.

== Reception ==
Professional ratings
Review scores
Source	Rating
AllMusic	3/5 stars
DownBeat	4.5/5 stars
The Penguin Guide to Jazz	3/4 stars
The Virgin Encyclopedia of Jazz	3/5 stars

Robert Palmer of The New York Times noted that the album "is steeped in the two altoists' rhythm-and-blues roots and should delight anyone who has enjoyed the World Saxophone Quartet in concert." A writer for Billboard remarked: "Lake and Hemphill require intense concentration, but to the patient, open-minded listener, their efforts can be rewarding." The Globe and Mail opined that "some of the music, especially the tune 'Buster Bee', is bebop 30 years later, after Ornette Coleman and after Anthony Braxton... It often swings—even though no one's counting time—and it's supremely lyrical."

In a review for AllMusic, Brian Olewnick stated that the album "allows [the musicians] an unusual intimacy that fosters some lovely playing and interaction," and wrote: "All of the tracks are composed (though allowing for substantial improvisation) and are a pleasingly varied bunch... Both players are near the top of their game, with subtle liquid phrasing giving way to impassioned cries on a moment's notice. Recommended." The authors of The Penguin Guide to Jazz Recordings called the album "nicely intimate," and commented: "It feels a little like eavesdropping on a private conversation, but a nice historical glimpse none the less."

Author Gary Giddins stated that, although "solo and duo wind recitals were commonplace" at the time of the recording, Buster Bee is "one of the best," showing Hemphill's "strong yet uncompromising individual link to Charlie Parker."

DownBeat reviewer John Litweiler wrote that "the act of creating together brings forth grace, respect, easy humor. Again and again each man's sensitivity to the other is tangible: here are two outstanding jazzmen renewing the discoveries of their many years’ association. Melody flows in a continuous stream from beginning to end of this album; more, the joy of Lake’s and Hemphill’s duo art communicates directly to the listener. Buster Bee is one of the highlights of a rich year for jazz recordings".

== Track listing ==
1. "Buster Bee" (Julius Hemphill) – 10:15
2. "Vator" (Oliver Lake) – 5:48
3. "Fertility" (Julius Hemphill) – 6:55
4. "'S'" (Julius Hemphill) – 8:08
5. "A Stand" (Oliver Lake) – 4:23
6. "Flesh Turns Chi" (Oliver Lake) – 9:49

== Personnel ==
- Oliver Lake – alto saxophone, soprano saxophone, flute, percussion
- Julius Hemphill – alto saxophone, soprano saxophone, flute
