= Circle Records (Germany) =

West Germany jazz record label

Circle Records was a West German jazz record label established in 1976.

Circle Records Germany has been relaunched and continued its activities in 2022 by restoring and remastering their originals such as releasing the Chet Baker Paris recordings from 1980.

www.circlerecords.de

== Discography ==
=== Albums ===
Catalog #	Leader	Album	Year
2976 / 1	Sam Rivers	The Tuba Trio Vol 1: Essence	76
2976 / 2	Sam Rivers	The Tuba Trio Vol 2	76
2976 / 3	Sam Rivers	The Tuba Trio Vol 3	76
18877 / 4	David Murray	Live Vol 1: Penthouse Jazz	77
16177 / 5	David Murray & James Newton	Solomon's Sons	77
7376 / 6	Sam Rivers	Jazz Of The 70's	73, 76
7677 / 7	Sam Rivers, James Newton	Flutes!	77, 76
18877 / 8	David Murray	Live Vol 2: Holy Siege On Intrigue	77
23578 / 9	Human Arts Ensemble	Live In Trio Performance Vol 1	78
14778 / 10	Phillip Wilson	Fruits	78
21877 / 11	James Newton	Binu	77
23578 / 12	Human Arts Ensemble	Live Vol 2	78
101978 / 13	Gil Evans	Little Wing	78
111178 / 14	Burton Greene	Structures: The N.B.G. Trio Live	78
1977 / 15	Luther Thomas	Funkey Donkey	77
15978 / 16	Keshavan Maslak	Buddha's Hand	78
5679 / 17	Cheik Tidiane Fall, Malachi Favors, Sunny Murray	African Magic: Great African Encounter	79
121178 / 18	Burton Greene	European Heritage	78
291079 / 19	Karl Berger & Lee Konitz	Seasons Change	79
31279 / 20	Marty Cook	Trance	79
7879 / 21	John Fischer	6 x 1 = 10 Decade	77,78
25680 / 22	Chet Baker	Night Bird	80
25680 / 23	Chet Baker	Tune Up	80
23581 / 24	Chet Baker	My Funny Valentine	81
23581 / 25	Chet Baker	Round Midnight	81
22380 / 26	Chet Baker	In Your Own Sweet Way	80
22380 / 27	Chet Baker	Just Friends	80
23581 / 28	Chet Baker	I Remember You	81
61084 / 29	Archie Shepp	African Moods	84
241184 / 30	Herb Geller	Hot House	84
24978 / 31	Archie Shepp, George Adams, & Heinz Sauer	Tenor Saxes	78
27680 / 32	Chet Baker	Conception	80
7884 / 33	Archie Shepp	Devil Blues	78,84
241184 / 34	Herb Geller	Fungi Mama	84
22380 / 35	Chet Baker	Down	80
25680 / 36	Chet Baker	It Never Entered My Mind	80
6984 / 37	George Adams, Billy Cobham & Johannes Faber	When Sun Lights Up The Future	

== See also ==
- List of record labels
