= Shadows and Reflections =

Studio album by Baikida Carroll
- Released: 1982
- Recorded: January 13 and 20, 1982
- Studio: Sound House Studio, Newburgh, New York
- Genre: Free jazz
- Length: 42:28
- Label: Soul Note; SN 1023
- Producer: Baikida Carroll

Baikida Carroll chronology
The Spoken Word (1979)	Shadows and Reflections (1982)	Door of the Cage (1995)

Shadows and Reflections is an album by trumpeter and composer Baikida Carroll. It was recorded on January 13 and 20, 1982, at Sound House Studio in Newburgh, New York, and was released on vinyl later that year by Soul Note. On the album, Carroll is joined by saxophonist Julius Hemphill, pianist Anthony Davis, double bassist Dave Holland, and drummer Pheeroan akLaff.

== Reception ==
Professional ratings
Review scores
Source	Rating
AllMusic	4/5 stars
The Penguin Guide to Jazz Recordings	4/4 stars
Tom Hull – on the Web	B+

In a review for AllMusic, Bob Rusch wrote: "The material here sounded like it could have been a late Blue Note recording; in fact, there were times when the horns brought back flashbacks of the Jackie McLean-Charles Tolliver front line of the '60s. And for all their avant-garde credentials, this group sounded very comfortable and at home with the squirrelly free bop displayed here."

On a similar note, Robert Palmer of The New York Times suggested that the album is "most reminiscent of the records the Blue Note label used to turn out in the mid-1960's - adventurous music that was always grounded in the verities of swing and the blues," and called it "a breath of fresh air." He remarked: "Anyone who doubts that musicians associated with the avant-garde can play this sort of thing, and make it move, should listen to what Mr. Carroll, Anthony Davis, Pheeroan Ak Laff, and the other musicians heard here do with it."

The authors of The Penguin Guide to Jazz Recordings awarded the album a full four stars, and commented: "Carroll has assembled a superb group of musicians... Holland... emerges as the key player, rooting the music in something dark and tremulously substantial."

== Track listing ==
Composed by Baikida Carroll.

1. "Kaki" – 7:18
2. "Jahi Sundance Lake" – 7:46
3. "Left Jab" – 8:58
4. "Pyramids" – 10:08
5. "At Roi" – 8:18

== Personnel ==
- Baikida Carroll – trumpet, flugelhorn
- Julius Hemphill – alto saxophone, tenor saxophone
- Anthony Davis – piano
- Dave Holland – double bass
- Pheeroan akLaff – drums
