= Luisah Teish =

American spiritual writer

Iyanifa Luisah Teish
- Fajembola Fatunmise
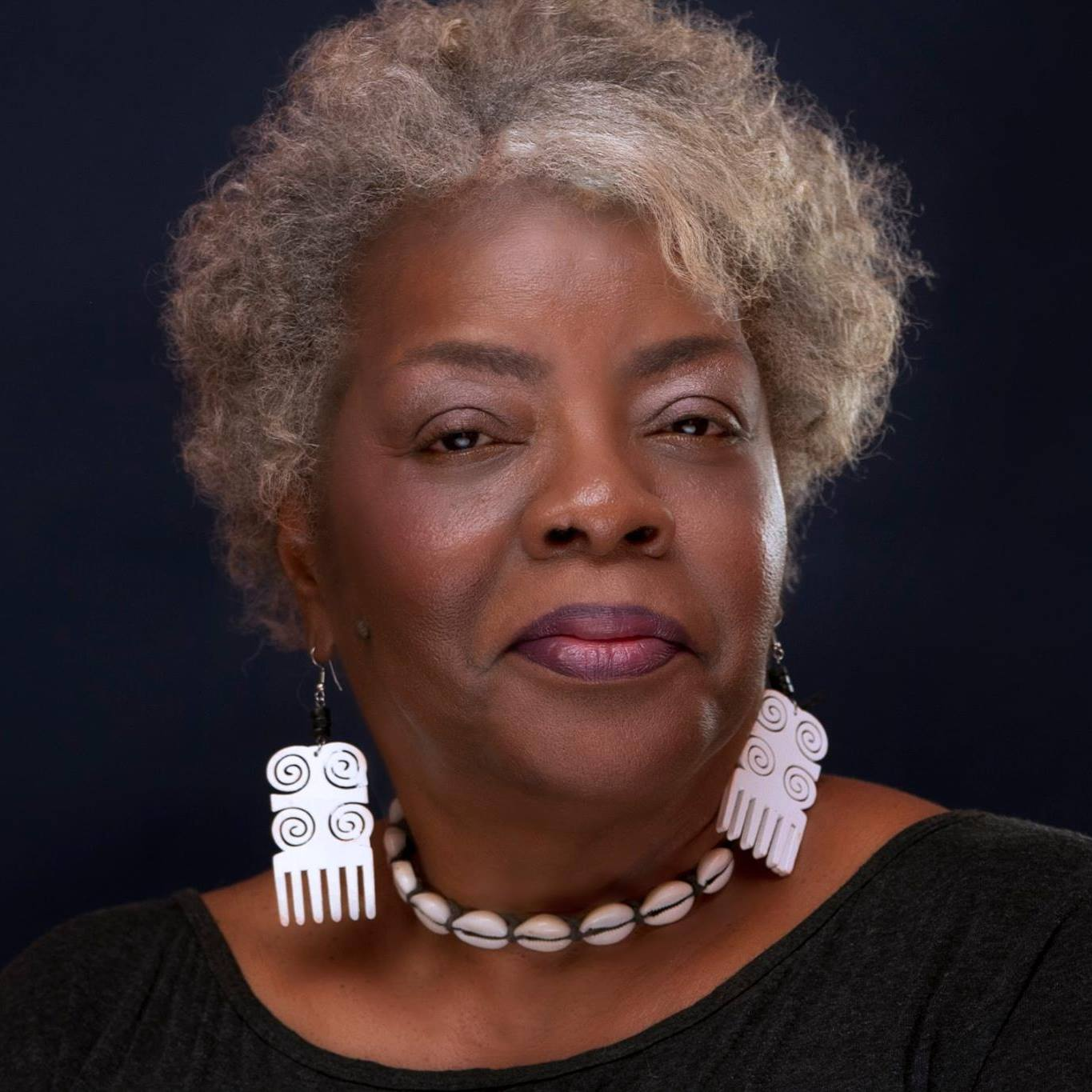
- Teish in 2017
- Born: April 20, 1948 (age 78); New Orleans, Louisiana
- Occupations: Teacher; author; Yoruba priestess
- Writing career
- Years active: 1977–present
- Subjects: Folklore; spirituality; magical realism
- Notable works: Jambalaya: The Natural Woman's Book of Personal Charms and Practical Rituals
- Website: yeyeluisahteish.com

Luisah Teish (/tiːʃ/ TEESH; also known as Iyanifa Fajembola Fatunmise) is a teacher and an author, most notably of Jambalaya: The Natural Woman's Book of Personal Charms and Practical Rituals. She is an Iyanifa and Oshun chief in the Yoruba Lucumi tradition.

== Life ==
Luisah Teish is an African-American, born in New Orleans, Louisiana. Her father, Wilson Allen, Sr. was an African Methodist Episcopal whose parents had been two-generation servants and only one generation away from slavery. Her mother, Serena "Rene" Allen, was a Catholic, of Haitian, French, and Choctaw heritage. Her original ancestry also includes Yoruba West African.

In the late 1960s, Teish was a dancer in Katherine Dunham's group, where she learned and performed traditional African and Caribbean dances. After leaving the dance company, she became a choreographer in St. Louis. In 1969 she joined the Fahami Temple of Amun-Ra, and it was here that she took the name "Luisah Teish", which means "adventuresome spirit". She led the dance troupe of the Black Artists Group (BAG) in St. Louis after the departure of BAG's first dance leader, Georgia Collins.

In the late 1970s she became an initiate and priestess of the Lucumi religion, and began teaching students in 1977. She currently resides in Oakland, California.

Teish has said, "My tradition is very celebratory - there's always music, dance, song, and food in our services - as well as a sense of reverence for the children. It's joyful as well as meditative."

One author said she was the "perhaps the most well known.. Yoruba priestess.. of the [San Francisco] Bay Area" (2010). Another author characterized her as "..well known internationally in Goddess circles as a writer and ritual-maker."

== Bibliography ==
- What Don't Kill is Fattening: Poems by Luisah Teish (1980) Fan Tree Press ASIN: B0007BJRRE
- Jambalaya: The Natural Woman's Book of Personal Charms and Practical Rituals (1988) HarperOne ISBN 0-06-250859-8, ISBN 978-0-06-250859-1
- Carnival of the Spirit: Seasonal Celebrations and Rites of Passage (1994) Harpercollins ISBN 0-06-250868-7, ISBN 978-0-06-250868-3
- Soul Between the Lines: Freeing Your Creative Spirit Through Writing (with Dorothy Randall Gray) (1998) Avon Books ISBN 0-380-79142-0, ISBN 978-0-380-79142-2
- Eye of the Storm (1998) E P Dutton ISBN 0-525-94032-4, ISBN 978-0-525-94032-6
- Jump Up: Good Times Throughout the Season with Celebrations from Around the World (2000) Conari Press ISBN 1-57324-551-8, ISBN 978-1-57324-551-7
- What Don’t Kill Is Fattening Revisited: Twenty Years of Poetry, Prose, and Myth (2002) Orikire Publications
- Zulu Shaman: Dreams, Prophecies, and Mysteries (with Vusamazulu Credo Mutwa and Stephen Larsen) (2003) Destiny Books (New Edition of Song of the Stars) ISBN 0-89281-129-3, ISBN 978-0-89281-129-8
