= Clevont Fitzhubert =

Studio album by Oliver Lake
- Released: 1981
- Recorded: April 13 & 14, 1981
- Genre: Jazz
- Length: 37:31
- Label: Black Saint
- Producer: Oliver Lake

Oliver Lake chronology
Jump Up (1981)	Clevont Fitzhubert (1981)	Plug It (1982)

Clevont Fitzhubert is an album by American jazz saxophonist Oliver Lake, recorded in 1981 for the Italian Black Saint label.

== Reception ==
The AllMusic review by Scott Yanow called the album a "consistently stimulating set... Worth several listens".

Professional ratings
Review scores
Source	Rating
AllMusic	3/5 stars
The Penguin Guide to Jazz Recordings	3/4 stars

== Track listing ==
All compositions by Oliver Lake except as indicated

1. "November '80" - 8:26
2. "Sop" - 4:15
3. "Clevont Fitzhubert" - 7:39
4. "King" (Baikida Carroll) - 8:11
5. "Tap Dancer" - 4:37
6. "Hmbay" - 4:23
  - Recorded at Barigozzi Studio in Milano, Italy, on April 13 & 14, 1981

== Personnel ==
- Oliver Lake - alto saxophone, soprano saxophone, flute
- Baikida Carroll - trumpet, flugelhorn
- Donald Smith - piano
- Pheeroan akLaff - drums
