= Inspiration (Sam Rivers album) =

Studio album by Sam Rivers' Rivbea All-star Orchestra
- Released: 1999
- Recorded: September 28–29, 1998
- Studio: Systems Two Recording Studio, Brooklyn, New York
- Genre: Jazz
- Length: 1:10:27
- Label: BMG France; 74321-64717-2
- Producer: Steve Coleman, Sam Rivers, Sophia Wong

Sam Rivers chronology
Eight Day Journal (1998)	Inspiration (1999)	Culmination (1999)

Inspiration is an album by multi-instrumentalist and composer Sam Rivers. It was recorded during September 1998 at Systems Two Recording Studio in Brooklyn, New York, at the same sessions that yielded the album Culmination, and was released in 1999 by BMG France. On the album, Rivers is joined by members of the Rivbea All-star Orchestra: saxophonists Greg Osby, Steve Coleman, Chico Freeman, Gary Thomas, and Hamiet Bluiett, trumpeters Baikida Carroll, James Zollar, Ralph Alessi, and Ravi Best, trombonists Art Baron, Joseph Bowie, and Ray Anderson, baritone horn player Joseph Daley, tubist Bob Stewart, bassist Doug Mathews, and drummer Anthony Cole.

== Reception ==
Professional ratings
Review scores
Source	Rating
All About Jazz	4.5/5 stars
AllMusic	5/5 stars
The Penguin Guide to Jazz	4/4 stars
Tom Hull – on the Web	B+

The album was nominated for "Best Large Jazz Ensemble Performance" at the 42nd Annual Grammy Awards.

In a review for AllMusic, Stephen Thomas Erlewine awarded the album a full 5 stars, calling it "astonishing." He wrote: "all of the compositions not only sound fresh, they sound visionary -- still ahead of their time. It's not only because the stellar musicians give vibrant, unpredictable performances, although that undeniably helps; Rivers' writing is the real key... Inspiration truly is a revelation, proving not only that Rivers retains all his creative power at the age of 75, but that avant-garde jazz can be as inviting as any other style without sacrificing any of its depth or daring."

Bill Shoemaker of JazzTimes stated that Rivers's "current work has a more vibrant edge than 99.9% of the music now glutting the market," and commented: "Rivers' avant-icon status obscures the fact that his sensibility is pan-stylistic, and that, more often than not, the dense clusters and jarring voicings of his orchestra works are in the service of setting up tangy funk, Latin, and swing grooves for soloists."

The authors of The Penguin Guide to Jazz Recordings awarded Inspiration a full 4 stars, and noted "the sheer originality of Rivers's concept: that he can mould an orchestra of highly individual performers so that it sounds like the expression of a single, idiosyncratic imagination."

Writing for All About Jazz, Glenn Astarita remarked: "Big band fanatics and modern jazz aficionados should enjoy the heck out of this one. A most gratifying and noteworthy effort from the venerable Sam Rivers and his modern jazz all-stars!"

Author Gary Giddins stated that the album "brims with the exhilaration exclusive to the form," and wrote: "The music is wonderfully schizoid; the dense voicings are dissonant, but the riffs and pithy solos are downright toasty."

A writer for Mother Jones commented: "Imagine funk idol Maceo Parker falling under the sway of abstract expressionism, and you have an idea of how Rivers' new album combines aggressive dissonance, tricky rhythms, and unconventional grooves... At 77, Rivers has produced an album that any audacious young avant-gardiste would envy."

== Track listing ==
All tracks composed by Sam Rivers.

1. "Vines" – 13:36
2. "Nebula" – 11:18
3. "Beatrice" – 10:37
4. "Inspiration" – 9:42
5. "Solace" – 11:01
6. "Whirlwind" – 5:44
7. "Rejuvenation" – 8:36

== Personnel ==
- Sam Rivers – soprano saxophone, tenor saxophone, flute
- Greg Osby – alto saxophone
- Steve Coleman – alto saxophone
- Chico Freeman – tenor saxophone
- Gary Thomas – tenor saxophone
- Hamiet Bluiett – baritone saxophone
- Baikida Carroll – trumpet
- James Zollar – trumpet
- Ralph Alessi – trumpet
- Ravi Best – trumpet
- Art Baron – trombone
- Joseph Bowie – trombone
- Ray Anderson – trombone
- Joseph Daley – baritone horn
- Bob Stewart – tuba
- Doug Mathews – electric bass
- Anthony Cole – drums
