= Live in New York (Julius Hemphill and Abdul Wadud album) =

Live album by Julius Hemphill and Abdul Wadud
- Released: 1978
- Recorded: May 28, 1976
- Venue: La MaMa, New York City
- Genre: Free jazz
- Length: 45:28
- Label: Red Records; VPA 138

Julius Hemphill chronology
Buster Bee (1978)	Live in New York (1978)	Flat-Out Jump Suite (1980)

Abdul Wadud chronology
By Myself (1977)	Live in New York (1978)	Straight Ahead/Free At Last (1979)

Live in New York is a live album by saxophonist Julius Hemphill and cellist Abdul Wadud. Featuring four Hemphill compositions, it was recorded at La MaMa in New York City, on May 28, 1976, and was released by the Italian label Red Records in 1978.

== Reception ==
Professional ratings
Review scores
Source	Rating
AllMusic	4.5/5 stars
The Encyclopedia of Popular Music	3/5 stars
The Penguin Guide to Jazz	3.5/4 stars
Tom Hull – on the Web	B+

In a review for AllMusic, Steve Loewy wrote: "The setting lets Hemphill stretch, his country and blues roots in full bloom. His poignant sound was never more compelling, and Wadud was a bracing partner whose emotional depth and extraordinary technique are unequaled on the instrument."

The authors of The Penguin Guide to Jazz Recordings stated that the four compositions "offer the best introduction to Hemphill the composer, even in the context of the most basic personnel. Virtually all the later things... stem from this."

== Track listing ==
Composed by Julius Hemphill.

1. "In Space" – 6:52
2. "Pensive" – 8:12
3. "Echo 1 (Morning)" – 7:40
4. "Echo 2 (Evening)" – 22:44

== Personnel ==
- Julius Hemphill – alto saxophone
- Abdul Wadud – cello
