= Seasons Change (Lee Konitz and Karl Berger album) =

Studio album by Lee Konitz and Karl Berger
- Released: 1980
- Recorded: October 29, 1979
- Studio: Bruno Spoerri Studios, Zürich, Switzerland
- Genre: Jazz
- Length: 42:10
- Label: Circle; RK 291079/19
- Producer: Rudolf Kreis and Michael E. Fischer

Lee Konitz chronology
Live at Laren (1979)	Seasons Change (1980)	Heroes (1980)

Karl Berger chronology
Changing the Time (1978)	Seasons Change (1979)	New Moon (1980)

Seasons Change is an album by saxophonist Lee Konitz and vibraphonist/pianist Karl Berger recorded in Zürich in 1979 and released on the German Circle label.

Professional ratings
Review scores
Source	Rating
Allmusic	3/5 stars

== Track listing ==
All compositions by Lee Konitz except where noted.

1. "Some Blues" - 4:53
2. "Ballad" - 4:47
3. "A Tuno for Bruno" - 4:09
4. "Standard" - 5:33
5. "Talk" (Karl Berger) - 5:02
6. "Seasons Change" (Berger) - 4:42
7. "Sundance" (Berger) - 2:10
8. "Mamidi II" (Berger) - 2:10
9. "Taking Time" (Berger) - 3:47
10. "Fun (Whole-Half Down 89)" (Berger) - 4:57

== Personnel ==
- Lee Konitz – alto saxophone
- Karl Berger – vibraphone, piano
