= Live at Laren =

Live album by Lee Konitz Nonet
- Released: 1984
- Recorded: August 12, 1979
- Venue: Laren Jazz Festival, North Holland
- Genre: Jazz
- Length: 51:07
- Label: Soul Note; 121 069
- Producer: Giovanni Bonandrini

Lee Konitz chronology
Four Keys (1979)	Live at Laren (1984)	Seasons Change (1979)

Live at Laren is a live album by American jazz saxophonist Lee Konitz's Nonet recorded in 1979 by Dutch Broadcasting, NOS -Hilversum and released on the Italian Soul Note label in 1984.

== Critical reception ==
Professional ratings
Review scores
Source	Rating
Allmusic	4/5 stars
The Penguin Guide to Jazz Recordings	2.5/4 stars

Ken Dryden on Allmusic called it: "One of the less familiar releases in Lee Konitz's extensive discography".

== Track listing ==
1. "April" (Lennie Tristano) - 7:03
2. "Who You" (Jimmy Knepper) - 6:15
3. "Without a Song" (Vincent Youmans, Billy Rose, Edward Eliscu) - 9:32
4. "Moon Dreams" (Chummy MacGregor, Johnny Mercer) - 3:45
5. "Times Lie" (Chick Corea) - 10:54
6. "Matrix" (Corea) - 13:38

== Personnel ==
- Lee Konitz – alto saxophone, soprano saxophone
- Red Rodney – trumpet, flugelhorn
- John Eckert - trumpet, flugelhorn, piccolo trumpet
- Jimmy Knepper – trombone
- Sam Burtis – bass trombone, tuba
- Ronnie Cuber – baritone saxophone, clarinet
- Ben Aranov – piano
- Ray Drummond – bass
- Billy Hart – drums
