= Art Baron =

American jazz trombonist (born 1950)

- Born: Arthur John Baron; January 5, 1950 (age 76); Bridgeport, Connecticut, U.S.
- Genres: Jazz
- Occupation: Musician
- Instrument: Trombone
- Years active: 1973–present

Arthur John Baron (born January 5, 1950) is an American jazz trombonist. He also plays didgeridoo, conch shell, penny-whistle, alto and bass recorder, and tuba.

== Career overview ==
Baron is an alumnus of the Berklee College of Music. He joined the Duke Ellington band in August 1973 at the age of 23 during the last year Ellington led the band and was the last trombonist Ellington ever hired. Baron leads The Duke's Men, a band made up of Duke Ellington band alumni. He has performed and/or recorded with Buddy Rich, Bruce Springsteen, Lou Reed, Stevie Wonder, James Taylor, Illinois Jacquet, Sam Eckhardt, Roswell Rudd, Mel Tormé, Charlie Musselwhite, Andy Harlow (né Andre H. Kahn; born 1945), Fontella Bass, Sam Rivers, Glen Velez, John Tchicai, Wilber Morris, Alan Silva, George Gruntz, Joey DeFrancesco, Bobby Watson, Elliott Sharp, Annea Lockwood, Matt Glaser, Cyro Baptista, and She & Him.

Baron lives in New York City.

== Discography ==
- Ray Anderson: Big Band Record (Gramavision, 1994) with the George Gruntz Concert Jazz Band
- Alice Babs: Far Away Star (Bluebell, 1973–1976); OCLC 458759220
- Betty Carter: The Music Never Stops (Blue Engine, 2019)
- Duke Ellington: Continuum (Fantasy, 1974–1975); OCLC 42554761
- Joey DeFrancesco: Where Were You? (Columbia, 1990); OCLC 21585305
- George Gruntz Concert Jazz Band: Blues 'n Dues et cetera (Enja, 1991); OCLC 716119553
- George Gruntz Concert Jazz Band: Beyond Another Wall (TCB (de), 1994); OCLC 41120645
- George Gruntz Concert Jazz Band: Merryteria (TCB, 1999); OCLC 767805575
- Lincoln Center Jazz Orchestra: Portraits by Ellington (Columbia, 1992); OCLC 178707422, 27118574
- Hal Willner Presents: Weird Nightmare: Meditations on Mingus (Columbia, 1992); OCLC 27261567
- Mingus Big Band: Nostalgia in Times Square (Dreyfus, 1993); OCLC 263151379
- Sam Rivers' Rivbea All-star Orchestra, Inspiration (BMG France, 1999)
- Sam Rivers' Rivbea All-star Orchestra, Culmination (BMG France, 1999)
- David Sanborn: Another Hand (Elektra, 1990), Upfront (Elektra, 1991); OCLC 173203209
- Alan Silva: Alan Silva & the Sound Visions Orchestra (Eremite, 1999); OCLC 54713022
- Peggy Stern: Actual Size (Koch, 1998); OCLC 43907867
- Frank Wess: Entre Nous (Concord, 1990); OCLC 26399518
- New York Composers Orchestra, music of Marty Ehrlich, Robin Holcomb, Wayne Horvitz, Doug Wieselman (de) (New World, 1990); OCLC 25094883
- New York Composers Orchestra: First Program in Standard Time (New World, 1990–1992); OCLC 26065265
- Bruce Springsteen: Wrecking Ball (Columbia, 2012); OCLC 773616043
- She & Him: Classics (Columbia, 2014); OCLC 894525699
- Stevie Wonder: Music of My Mind (Tamla, 1972); OCLC 44970068
