= Raw Materials and Residuals =

Studio album by Julius Hemphill
- Released: 1978
- Recorded: November 1977
- Genre: Jazz
- Length: 35:51
- Label: Black Saint
- Producer: Giacomo Pellicciotti

Julius Hemphill chronology
| Roi Boyé & the Gotham Minstrels (1977) | Raw Materials and Residuals (1978) | Buster Bee (1978) |

Raw Materials and Residuals is an album by jazz saxophonist Julius Hemphill featuring cellist Abdul Wadud and percussionist Don Moye recorded in 1977 for the Italian Black Saint label.

== Reception ==
Professional ratings
Review scores
| Source | Rating |
|---|---|
| AllMusic | 4/5 stars |
| The Rolling Stone Jazz Record Guide | 4/5 stars |
| The Virgin Encyclopedia of Jazz | 3/5 stars |

The editors of AllMusic awarded the album 4 stars, and reviewer Michael G. Nastos called it "One of the great titles in the modern jazz chronology... a landmark recording in the second wave avant-garde movement of the '70s".

Writing for The New York Times, Robert Palmer stated that the album "marks a triumphant return to the sparseness of Dogon A.D., but because the saxophonist and Mr. Wadud have grown, the music is more varied and resourceful."

Seymour Wright of The Wire described the recording as "an album of clarity and un-compromise," and "a brilliant recording of Hemphill's metal-hard saxophone sound – silver, guttural, in which the voice is ever present." He commented: "The striking cover photo of a shaven-headed Hemphill, arms folded across his naked torso with his alto saxophone hanging pendular, connotes something precise, poised and physical. The same goes for the elemental, alliterative poetics of its title(s). The LP's five compositions present a svelte, sinewy, structured trio music that, as Hemphill puts it in his sleevenotes, 'progresses from vigour-to-reflection-to-vigour'."

== Track listing ==
All compositions by Julius Hemphill

1. "C" - 6:27
2. "Mirrors" - 7:03
3. "Long Rhythm" - 5:00
4. "Plateau" - 8:58
5. "G Song" - 8:23

- Recorded at Generation Sound Studios in New York City in November 1977

== Personnel ==
- Julius Hemphill - alto saxophone, soprano saxophone
- Abdul Wadud - cello
- Don Moye - percussion
