= La Clede, Illinois =

La Clede
- Unincorporated community
- Location within Illinois
- Coordinates: 38°52′50″N 88°42′46″W
- Country: United States
- State: Illinois
- County: Fayette
- Township: LaClede
- Named after: Pierre Laclède

Area
  - Total: 0.31 sq mi (0.80 km^{2})
  - Land: 0.31 sq mi (0.80 km^{2})
  - Water: 0 sq mi (0.00 km^{2})
- Elevation: 574 ft (175 m)

Population (2020)
  - Total: 113
  - Density: 367.9/sq mi (142.04/km^{2})
- ZIP code: 62838
- FIPS code: 17-40520
- GNIS feature ID: 2806512

La Clede is an unincorporated community in La Clede Township, Fayette County, Illinois, United States. As of the 2020 census, La Clede had a population of 113.

The community was named after Pierre Laclède, a French fur trader.

== Geography ==
According to the 2021 census gazetteer files, La Clede has a total area of 0.31 square miles (0.80 km^{2}), all land.

== Demographics ==
Historical population
Census	Pop.	Note	%±
2020	113		—
U.S. Decennial Census

La Clede first appeared as a census designated place in the 2020 U.S. census.

As of the 2020 census there were 113 people, 14 households, and 5 families residing in the CDP. The population density was 368.08 inhabitants per square mile (142.12/km^{2}). There were 40 housing units at an average density of 130.29 per square mile (50.31/km^{2}). The racial makeup of the CDP was 97.35% White, 0.00% African American, 0.00% Native American, 0.00% Asian, 0.00% Pacific Islander, 0.00% from other races, and 2.65% from two or more races. Hispanic or Latino of any race were 0.00% of the population.

There were 14 households, out of which 0.0% had children under the age of 18 living with them, 35.71% were married couples living together, 0.00% had a female householder with no husband present, and 64.29% were non-families. 0.00% of all households were made up of individuals, and 0.00% had someone living alone who was 65 years of age or older. The average household size was 3.20 and the average family size was 2.36.

The CDP's age distribution consisted of 0.0% under the age of 18, 0.0% from 18 to 24, 0% from 25 to 44, 51.5% from 45 to 64, and 48.5% who were 65 years of age or older. The median age was 50.9 years. For every 100 females, there were 135.7 males. For every 100 females age 18 and over, there were 135.7 males.
