= Tricks of the Trade, Vol. II: The Money Is Made =

Tricks Of The Trade, Vol. II: The Money is Made

Studio album by Detroit's Most Wanted
- Released: April 6, 1992
- Recorded: 1992
- Length: 53:36
- Label: Ichiban Records, Bryant Records
- Producer: Dunkin Hines, Motsi Ski, Joel H. Bryant (Exec.)

Detroit's Most Wanted chronology
Tricks Of The Trade (1990)	Tricks Of The Trade, Vol. II: The Money is Made (1992)	Many Faces Of Death, Vol. III (1993)

Professional ratings
Review scores
Source	Rating
Allmusic	2/5 stars

Tricks Of The Trade, Vol. II: The Money Is Made is the second album by Detroit rap group Detroit's Most Wanted released on April 6, 1992. It is their most successful album as it has peaked at #58 on the Billboard Top R&B Albums Chart. The Money Is Made and Pop The Trunk were released as singles. A music video was made for the song The Money Is Made which was the first rap video to ever be filmed at a casino as it was shot on location at Atlantic City, New Jersey.

== Special Anniversary Edition ==
In 2004, the album was re-released as a 2-disc set which contained an updated version of the cover as well as a separate disc of all new songs. The late rapper Proof from D-12 appears on two songs in this disc.

== Track listing ==
1. Intro
2. Pop the Trunk
3. The Setup
4. The Money Is Made
5. The Retaliation
6. Tricks of the Trade Pt. II
7. Rape (Scene I)
8. Put the Suckers to Sleep
9. Backstabber
10. Rape (Scene II)
11. The City of Boom (Remix)
12. A.P.B. (That's the Name of the Click)
13. All About Ya Yo
14. To the Real Ones
15. That Funky Stuff

=== 2004 Special Anniversary Edition bonus disc ===
1. Guess Who's Back
2. Life On The Streets
3. We Here We Ain't Never Left
4. Dry Your Eyes (Featuring Eddie Stubbles)
5. My Old Man
6. Civil War (Featuring Proof, Big Dogg, & T-Stuck)
7. Ain't No Punk In Me
8. 4 Fathers (Featuring Proof, Big Dogg, & T-Stuck)
9. Last Don (Featuring Eddie Stubbles)
