= In Paris, Aries 1973 =

Live album by Black Artists Group
- Released: 1973
- Recorded: 1973
- Venue: Paris
- Genre: Free jazz
- Label: Aguirre Records

In Paris, Aries 1973 is a live album by the Black Artists Group, featuring saxophonist Oliver Lake, trumpeters Baikida Carroll and Floyd LeFlore, trombonist Joseph Bowie, and drummer Charles "Bobo" Shaw. The album was recorded in 1973 in Paris, and was initially self-released in very limited quantities. It was reissued in 2011 in a limited edition of 500 LPs by Rank and File Records, and was remastered and reissued on LP by Aguirre Records in 2018, with extensive liner notes by Julian Cowley, again in a limited edition of 500 copies.

In Paris, Aries 1973 is the only album ever issued under the BAG name. The group had traveled to Paris at the recommendation of Lester Bowie, and used the Art Ensemble of Chicago's agent upon arrival. The zodiac reference in the album title is a tribute to bassist and group member Kada Kayan, to whom the album is dedicated, and who fell ill and died before the group left for Paris.

== Reception ==
Elliott Sharp included the album in a Village Voice article titled "Ten Free Jazz Albums to Hear Before You Die," describing it as a "gem."

Writer Greg Tate stated that, while listening to the album, he found himself "returned to a state of analogue innocence and freedom jazz paradise regained," and wrote that he treasured "the audible intimacy of the setting." He praised "the spirited generosity and affability that can be heard going on between the members... how conversational, elated, and relaxed the group sounds unleashing all that artillery." He concluded: "In Paris is a welcome addition to a small and brilliant canon of mature, atmospheric album-length freedom jazz works... by a pan-idiomatic and boundary-free hive mind of spiritually connected virtuosi."

In an article for Fact Magazine, Jon Dale wrote: "it's a scorching set, moving from relatively denuded passages for multiple percussion and snake-charming sax, through to more reflective, intimate improvisations."

Regarding "Something to Play On," author Max Brzezinski commented that it "creates a cacophony of rhythm out of pieces of metal and found percussion–it, like the best of the free jazz, is more spirited, even aggressively so, than the 'spiritual' tag might suggest."

Bill Shoemaker, writing for Point of Departure, noted that, even during "flat out" sections, the musicians "avoid trampling over each other or creating a muddy mass of sound." Regarding their visit to Paris, he commented: "Given the quality of In Paris, Aries 1973, it is clear they arrived ready."

Thurston Moore included the recording in his "Top Ten from the Free Jazz Underground" list (first published in 1995 in the second issue of the defunct Grand Royal Magazine), writing: "This is squeaky, spindly stuff and very OPEN and a good indication of what was happening in the early 70's."

== Track listing ==
Track timings not provided.

=== Side one ===
1. "Echos" (Carroll, Shaw, Le Flore, Bowie, Lake)
2. "Something to Play On" (Shaw)

=== Side two ===
1. "Re-Cre-A-Tion" (Lake)
2. "OLCSJBFLBC Bag" (BAG)

== Personnel ==
- Oliver Lake – reeds, flute, percussion
- Baikida Carroll – trumpet, flugelhorn, percussion
- Floyd LeFlore – trumpet, voice, percussion
- Joseph Bowie – trombone, percussion
- Charles "Bobo" Shaw – drums, percussion
