= LaClede Township, Fayette County, Illinois =

LaClede Township
- Township
- Location in Fayette County

- Fayette County's location in Illinois
- Coordinates: 38°52′19″N 88°45′00″W
- Country: United States
- State: Illinois
- County: Fayette
- Established: November 9, 1859
- Named for: Pierre Laclède

Area
  - Total: 36.84 sq mi (95.4 km^{2})
  - Land: 36.8 sq mi (95 km^{2})
  - Water: 0.04 sq mi (0.10 km^{2}) 0.11%
- Elevation: 584 ft (178 m)

Population (2020)
  - Total: 844
  - Density: 22.9/sq mi (8.86/km^{2})
- Time zone: UTC-6 (CST)
  - Summer (DST): UTC-5 (CDT)
- ZIP codes: 62426, 62838, 62880
- FIPS code: 17-051-40533

LaClede Township is one of twenty townships in Fayette County, Illinois, USA. As of the 2020 census, its population was 844 and it contained 374 housing units.

LaClede Township was named for Pierre Laclède, the founder of St. Louis, Missouri.

== Geography ==
According to the 2021 census gazetteer files, LaClede Township has a total area of 36.84 square miles (95.42 km^{2}), of which 36.80 square miles (95.31 km^{2}) (or 99.89%) is land and 0.04 square miles (0.10 km^{2}) (or 0.11%) is water.

=== Cities, towns, villages ===
- Farina (northeast three-quarters)

=== Unincorporated towns ===
- La Clede

=== Cemeteries ===
The township contains Farina Cemetery.

=== Major highways ===
- Interstate 57
- Illinois Route 185

== Demographics ==
As of the 2020 census there were 844 people, 336 households, and 212 families residing in the township. The population density was 22.91 inhabitants per square mile (8.85/km^{2}). There were 374 housing units at an average density of 10.15 per square mile (3.92/km^{2}). The racial makeup of the township was 96.21% White, 0.00% African American, 0.24% Native American, 0.59% Asian, 0.00% Pacific Islander, 0.12% from other races, and 2.84% from two or more races. Hispanic or Latino of any race were 1.18% of the population.

There were 336 households, out of which 31.00% had children under the age of 18 living with them, 48.51% were married couples living together, 12.20% had a female householder with no spouse present, and 36.90% were non-families. 31.50% of all households were made up of individuals, and 11.60% had someone living alone who was 65 years of age or older. The average household size was 2.72 and the average family size was 3.30.

The township's age distribution consisted of 20.2% under the age of 18, 11.2% from 18 to 24, 19% from 25 to 44, 22% from 45 to 64, and 27.6% who were 65 years of age or older. The median age was 44.9 years. For every 100 females, there were 101.5 males. For every 100 females age 18 and over, there were 104.8 males.

The median income for a household in the township was $52,833, and the median income for a family was $60,000. Males had a median income of $34,881 versus $23,125 for females. The per capita income for the township was $26,690. About 22.2% of families and 17.1% of the population were below the poverty line, including 28.7% of those under age 18 and 12.3% of those age 65 or over.

Historical population
Census	Pop.	Note	%±
2000	899		—
2010	909		1.1%
2020	844		−7.2%
U.S. Decennial Census

== School districts ==
- Altamont Community Unit School District 10
- Effingham Community Unit School District 40
- South Central Community Unit School District 401

== Political districts ==
- Illinois's 19th congressional district
- State House District 102
- State Senate District 51
