= Shirley LeFlore =

American poet (1940–2019)

Shirley LeFlore (1940–2019) was an American poet, one of St. Louis' most influential performance art poets. Before she became a board member for Word In Motion, she split her time between performances in New York City and teaching creative writing at the University of Missouri–St. Louis. One of the premiere women's voices in St. Louis, Shirley has been a part of many underground activists poetry organizations including the Black Artists' Group and Harmony. Brassbones and Rainbows, a collection of her work, is available from 2-Leaf Press.

LeFlore was also a recipient of the Warrior Poet Award from Word in Motion in 2005.

She died from renal failure at her home in Frontenac, Missouri on May 12, 2019.
