= Charles "Bobo" Shaw =

American musician

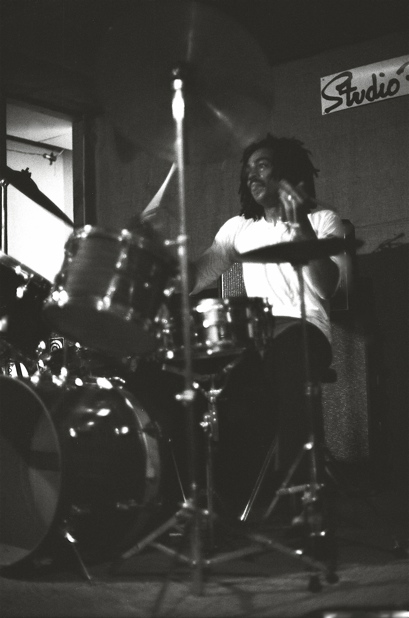
1976

Charles Wesley "Bobo" Shaw (September 5, 1947 – January 16, 2017) was an American free jazz drummer, known as a prominent member of the Human Arts Ensemble and Black Artists Group. He was born in Pope, Mississippi, United States.

Charles "Bobo" Shaw joined the American Woodsman Drummer bugle corp in 1953 and also played with the Tom Powel Post American Legion #77. Shaw also learned trombone and bass growing up, and studied drums under Joe Charles and Elijah Shaw. "Bobo" also studied with Rich O'Donnel and Bernnie Snyder of the Saint Louis Symphony Orchestra. He also was a founding member of the Black Artists Group, a St. Louis, Missouri, ensemble, in the 1960s; during that decade he also played with Lester Bowie, Frank Lowe, Hamiett Bluiett, and Oliver Lake. He moved to Europe later in the 1960s and played in Paris with Anthony Braxton, Steve Lacy, Frank Wright, Alan Silva, Michel Portal, Cecil Taylor, and Frank Lowe.

After returning to St. Louis, he played with Lake again in 1971 and then in the 1970s led the Human Arts Ensemble, playing with Lester Bowie, Joseph Bowie, Julius Hemphill, David Murray and Lake again. He played with Billy Bang in the 1980s, and experimented with incorporating new wave and funk music into his improvisational jam sessions at venues in New York City.

Charles was a long time resident of Garfield Apartments, a part of Peter & Paul Community Service in St Louis, Missouri. He was placed into a nursing care center in December 2016 due to his failing health. Shaw died on January 16, 2017, at the age of 69.

== Discography ==
=== As leader ===
- Red, Black & Green (Universal Justice Records, 1972; Eremite, 2008) with Solidarity Unit, Inc.
- Junk Trap (Black Saint, 1978)
- Concere Ntasiah (Universal Justice, 1978)
- Streets of St. Louis (Moers Music, 1978)
- P'NKJ'ZZ featuring Joseph Bowie and The Human Arts Ensemble (Muse Records 5232, 1981)
- Bugle Boy Bop (Muse, 1983)

=== As sideman ===
- Billy Bang, The Fire from Within (Soul Note, 1985)
- Black Artists Group, In Paris, Aries 1973 (self-released, 1973; reissued by Aguirre, 2018)
- Joseph Bowie, Luther Thomas, I Can't Figure Out (Whatcha Doin' to Me) (Moers Music, 1979)
- Lester Bowie, Fast Last! (Muse, 1974)
- Lester Bowie, Rope-A-Dope (Muse, 1976)
- Anthony Braxton, Quintet (Basel) 1977 (hatOLOGY, 2001)
- Anthony Braxton, Orchestra (Paris) 1978 (Braxton Bootleg, 2011)
- Anthony Braxton, Quintet (Moers) 1977 05.30 (Braxton Bootleg, 2013)
- Defunkt, Defunkt (Hannibal, 1980)
- Human Arts Ensemble, Whisper of Dharma (Universal Justice, 1972)
- Human Arts Ensemble, The Human Arts Ensemble Live (Circle, 1978)
- Leroy Jenkins/Jazz Composer's Orchestra, For Players Only (JCOA, 1975)
- Oliver Lake, Heavy Spirits (Arista/Freedom, 1975)
- Oliver Lake, Ntu: Point from Which Creation Begins (Arista/Freedom, 1976)
- Frank Lowe, Fresh (Arista/Freedom, 1975)
- Frank Lowe, The Flam (Black Saint, 1976)
- Juma Sultan's Aboriginal Music Society, Father of Origin (Eremite, 2011) recorded in 1970–1971
- Luther Thomas, Funky Donkey Vol. 1 (Creative Consciousness, 1977)
- Luther Thomas, Banana (The Lost Session, St. Louis, 1973) (Atavistic, 2001)
