= Detroit's Most Wanted =

American rapper

- Also known as: D.M.W.
- Origin: Detroit, Michigan
- Genres: Hardcore hip hop
- Years active: 1986-1993, 2004-present
- Labels: Bryant Records; Ichiban Records
- Members: Motsi Ski; MC Lee; DJ Dunkin Hines

Detroit's Most Wanted is an American hip hop group from Detroit, Michigan. Formed in 1986, the group pioneered Detroit hardcore hip hop. The group was one of the first Detroit rap groups to secure a national record label deal, although they did not achieve national success.

== Formation ==
Motsi Ski met MC Lee at Cooley High School and DJ Dunkin Hines through a mutual friend. The guys originally hated each other for a little while until they were able to put their differences aside and stop competing with each other for the attention of girls. The trio formed Detroit's Most Wanted in 1986 and were financed by a local drug dealer through the making of their debut album.

== Tricks Of The Trades and Tricks Of The Trade, Vol. II: The Money is Made (1990-1992) ==
In 1990, DMW released their debut album Tricks Of The Trades. The album was independently released on Motsi Ski's label Bryant Records and the album became a local bestseller, reaching No. 83 on the Billboard Top R&B Albums chart. DMW signed to Ichiban Records and secured national distribution through them some time after and released their most successful album, Tricks Of The Trade, Vol. II: The Money is Made on April 6, 1992. Like their debut, The album was well received in their hometown of Detroit and reached the Billboard Top R&B Albums chart, peaking at No. 58. A music video for "The Money Is Made" was made and was able to gain some airplay locally in Detroit and nationwide. The video was shot on location in Atlantic City, New Jersey, and was the first rap video to be shot in a casino. At this point, The group began gaining a cult following that went beyond their hometown of Detroit and eventually earned the attention of MC Hammer.

== Break-up, DMW continuing on as a Motsi Ski solo project (1993-1997) ==
DJ Duncan Hines wanted to rap more on the group's songs but Motsi objected to this idea, thinking that Hines should focus more on being a DJ instead of a rapper, which would cause a rift in the group. Then, MC Hammer began showing interest in the group and wanted to sign them to his record label, Bust It Records. However, group leader Motsi Ski turned down the offer citing a disapproval of Hammer's plans for the group which would involve a name change and a toning down of the group's lyrical content. However, this did not stop DJ Hines and MC Lee from accepting the offer and the two left Detroit's Most Wanted to form Ditch Diggers on Hammer's label. This left Motsi as the only remaining member in the group. On March 29, 1993, DMW released its third and final album, Many Faces Of Death, Vol. III. The album was not as successful as the previous two albums, as it did not chart on any of the Billboard charts but the album still sold pretty well locally in the city of Detroit. It was the final DMW album to be released through Ichiban Records. Now a solo project, Motsi used the DMW name for the fourth album which was called Bow The F--- Down. It was released on May 16, 1994. In the album, Motsi dissed his former partners DJ Duncan Hines and MC Lee in a remix to "Legalize It" as retaliation for them leaving taunting messages on his answering machine, and also make fun of them in the album's liner notes by saying: Special shout out to them hoe niggas for going bootie i got tired of carrying yall hoes anyway bitch ass niggas. Despite this, the three always respected each other and still managed to keep in contact with each other after the break-up of the group. On November 15, 1994, a compilation entitled Early Days was released and it featured songs from DMW's first two albums. The final DMW album, Ghetto Drama, was released on January 9, 1996. Throughout the mid-1990s, Motsi began experiencing legal troubles as he was incarcerated on separate occasions for marijuana possession, violating probation, and carrying a firearm as a convicted felon. The DMW name was officially retired after Ghetto Drama and Motsi re-surfaced with his own name as a solo artist in the 2000s.

== Reunion, Tricks Of The Trade, Vol. II Anniversary Edition, and recent events (2004-present) ==
In 2004, Motsi reunited with DJ Dunkin Hines and MC Lee and reformed Detroit's Most Wanted. Shortly after the reunion, the group re-released their most successful album Tricks Of The Trade Vol. II: The Money Is Made on December 28, 2004. This re-release, known as the Special Anniversary Edition, featured an updated version of the original album's cover as well as a bonus disc of nine new songs. The group planned to release a new album entitled Timeless, but as of 2019, that album has never been released. On June 16, 2011, a new song by DMW entitled "Pay Homage" was uploaded onto YouTube. Today, DMW occasionally performs in their hometown of Detroit. On May 25, 2012, DMW released Greatest Hits, which contained 15 of their best-known songs. On November 14, 2012, DMW performed at the Detroit Old School Legends Of Hip Hop reunion party alongside other Detroit rappers such as Awesome Dre, A.W.O.L., Dice, and many others. On March 4, 2014, The group released a second Greatest Hits album entitled Anthology, which celebrated the group's 25th anniversary and featured 26 of the group's most well-known songs.

== Discography ==
=== Studio albums ===
- 1990: Tricks Of The Trades
- 1992: Tricks Of The Trade, Vol. II: The Money is Made
- 1993: Many Faces Of Death, Vol. III
- 1994: Bow The F--- Down
- 1996: Ghetto Drama

=== Compilation albums ===
- 1994: Early Years
- 2012: Greatest Hits
- 2014: Anthology
