= Luther Thomas =

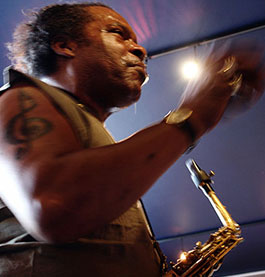

Background information
- Born: June 23, 1950; United States
- Origin: St. Louis, Missouri, United States
- Died: September 8, 2009 (aged 59) Denmark
- Genres: Jazz
- Occupation: Instrumentalist
- Instrument: Alto saxophone

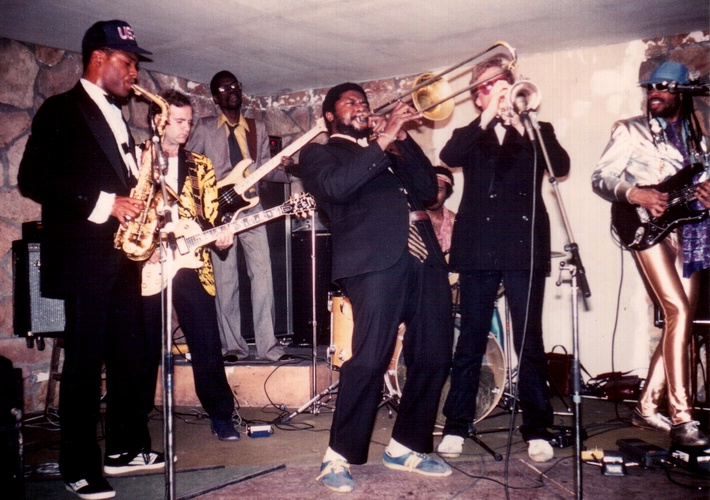
Dizzazz in June 1981. From left to right : Luther Thomas (as), Danny Petroni (g), Donald Nicks (bass), Marvin Neal (tb), Warren Benbow (drums), John K. Mulkerin (tp) and Billy "Spaceman" Paterson (g)

Luther Thomas was an alto saxophonist and multi-instrumentalist from St. Louis.

He is known for his free jazz playing drawing also on funk. He was involved with the Black Artists Group starting in the 1960s, played in the Human Arts Ensemble with Charles Bobo Shaw in the 1970s, and led a group called Dizzazz in the early 1980s. He has also played saxophone for James Chance and the Contortions. Thomas-led sessions from the early 1970s have been reissued on CD as part of Atavistic Records' Unheard Music Series. Luther Thomas was born on June 23, 1950, and died on September 8, 2009.

== Discography ==
- Luther Thomas Creative Ensemble – Funky Donkey (Circle)
- Human Arts Ensemble: Junk Trap (Black Saint, 1978)
- Human Arts Ensemble: : Live, Vol. 1 (Circle, 1978)
- Saint Louis Creative Ensemble: Live at Moers (Moers Music, 1979)
- Billy Bang Sextet with Frank Lowe: Sweet Space (Anima, 1979)
- Luther Thomas and Dizzaz: Yo' Momma (Moers, 1981)
- Luther Thomas Quintett: Don't Tell! (2007, with Ted Daniel, Charles Eubanks, Wilber Morris, Denis Charles)
- BAGin It (CIMP, 1996) with Ted daniel, Wilber Morris, Dennis Charles
- Luther Thomas and John Lindberg: Spirit of St. Louis (Ayler Records, 2008)
- DizzazzDatonezz Gang$tarJazz with Per Løkkegaard and Miloud Sabri (Helicopter Records, 2010)
- Luther Thomas: In Denmark (ILK Music, 2014)

== Gallery ==
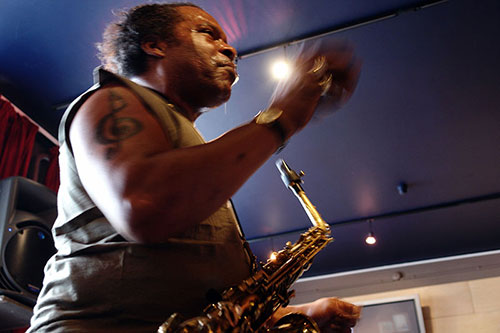

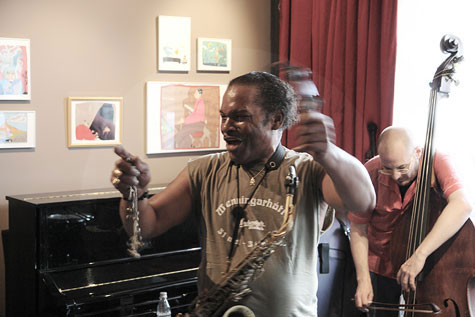

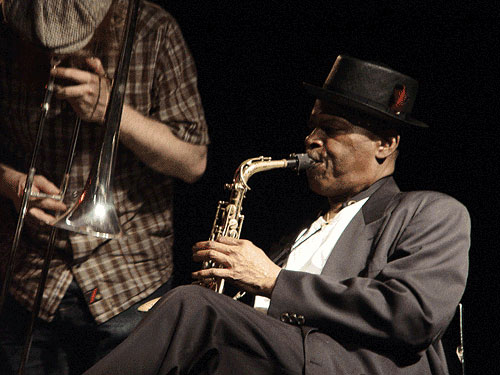
