= Joseph Bowie =

American jazz musician

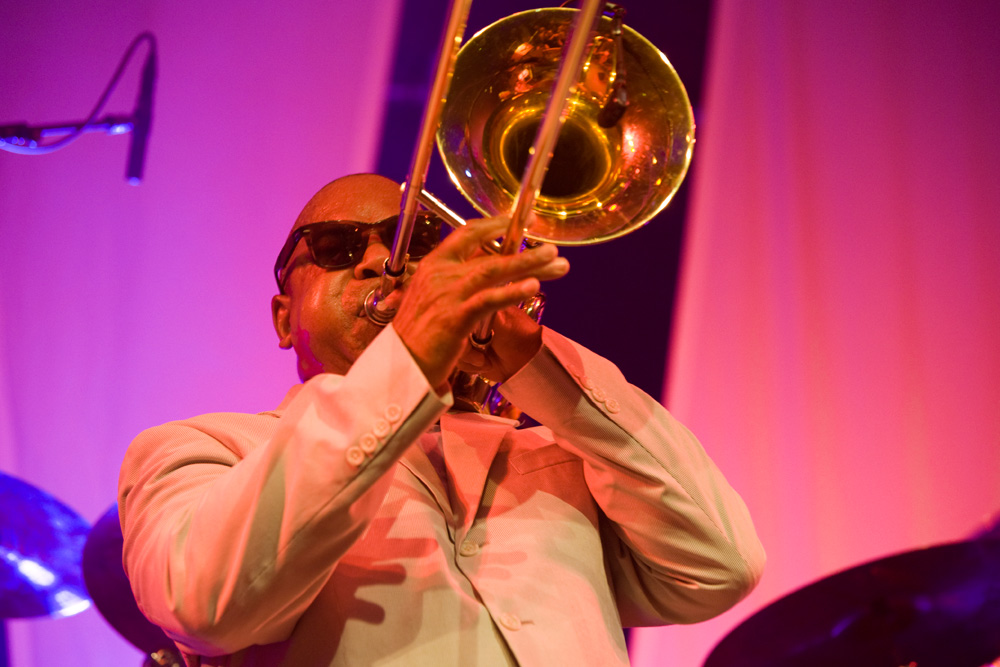
- Bowie at Moers Festival 2012

Background information
- Born: October 17, 1953 (age 72); St. Louis, Missouri, U.S.
- Genres: Jazz fusion, R&B, jazz, funk
- Occupation: Musician
- Instruments: Trombone, vocals
- Labels: Black Saint, DIW
- Website: josephbowie.com

Joseph Bowie (born October 17, 1953) is an American jazz trombonist and vocalist. The brother of trumpeter Lester Bowie, Joseph is known for leading the jazz-punk group Defunkt and for membership in the Ethnic Heritage Ensemble.

== Career ==
Bowie was greatly influenced by his older brothers, saxophonist Byron Bowie and trumpeter Lester Bowie. His brother Lester Bowie was married to R&B singer Fontella Bass, whose 1965 hit "Rescue Me" reached number one on the Billboard R&B chart. Their son Bahnamous Lee Bowie, Joseph's nephew, is a documented member of Defunkt (keyboards) and record producer who appeared as a featured guest on two Art Ensemble of Chicago recordings, Ancient to the Future (DIW Records, 1987) and Coming Home Jamaica (Atlantic Records, 1998). His first international tour was with Oliver Lake of the Black Artists Group in 1971. During this time in Paris, he worked with Alan Silva, Frank Wright, and Bobby Few. He also worked with Dr. John in Montreux in 1973. He moved to New York City, and with the help of Off Broadway Theater impresario Ellen Stewart he established La Mama children's theater. He performed with Cecil Taylor, Human Arts Ensemble, Nona Hendryx, Leroy Jenkins, Vernon Reid, Stanley Cowell, Sam Rivers, Philippe Gaillot, Dominique Gaumont and Ornette Coleman. In 1976 he moved to Chicago, where he led bands for Tyrone Davis and other R&B artists.

Returning to New York City in 1978 he began singing with punk and funk musician James Chance and the Contortions. Defunkt was born during that time. During the next 25 years, Defunkt recorded 15 albums. Bowie has collaborated with Jean-Paul Bourelly and Jamaaladeen Tacuma. He has performed "big band funk" arrangements with Ed Partyka at Music School Lucerne, Barbary Coast Ensemble at Dartmouth College, JazzArt Orchestra, and the HR Frankfurt Radio Big Band. The first Defunkt Big Band debuted in 1999 in New York City at the Texaco Jazz Festival sponsored by the Knitting Factory.

In 2003, he moved to the Netherlands where he met Hans Dulfer and was introduced to the Dutch music scene. He has performed with Hans and Candy Dulfer and also performs as guest with the Saskia Laroo Band, Naked Ears, Monsieur Dubois, Emergency Room, Funkateer, Seven Eleven, and Almost Three.

In 2014 he produced Sax Pistols Allergy for the U.S (ZIP Records) with lyricist Hilarius Hofstede and musicians Yuri Honing, Luc Houtcamp, Chazzy Green, Bart Wirtz, Koen Schouten, James White and Defunkt rhythm section of Kim Clarke, Tobias Ralph, and Rocco Zifarelli. In 2009 he created Defunkt Mastervolt with Paris-based musicians Linley Marthe, Rocco Zifarelli, Emma Lamadji, Michael Lecoq, and Jon Grandcamp. The album Defunkt Mastervolt was released in 2015 on ZIP Records.

Robin van Erven Dorens directed the documentary In Groove We Trust about Bowie's life.

== Discography ==
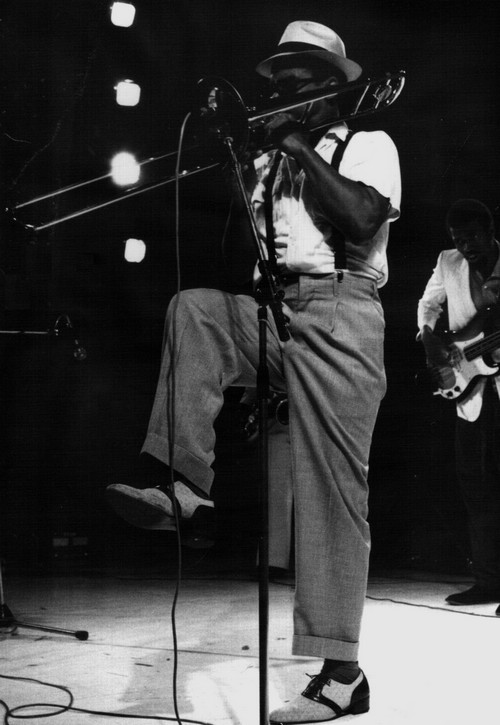
Bowie in 1980

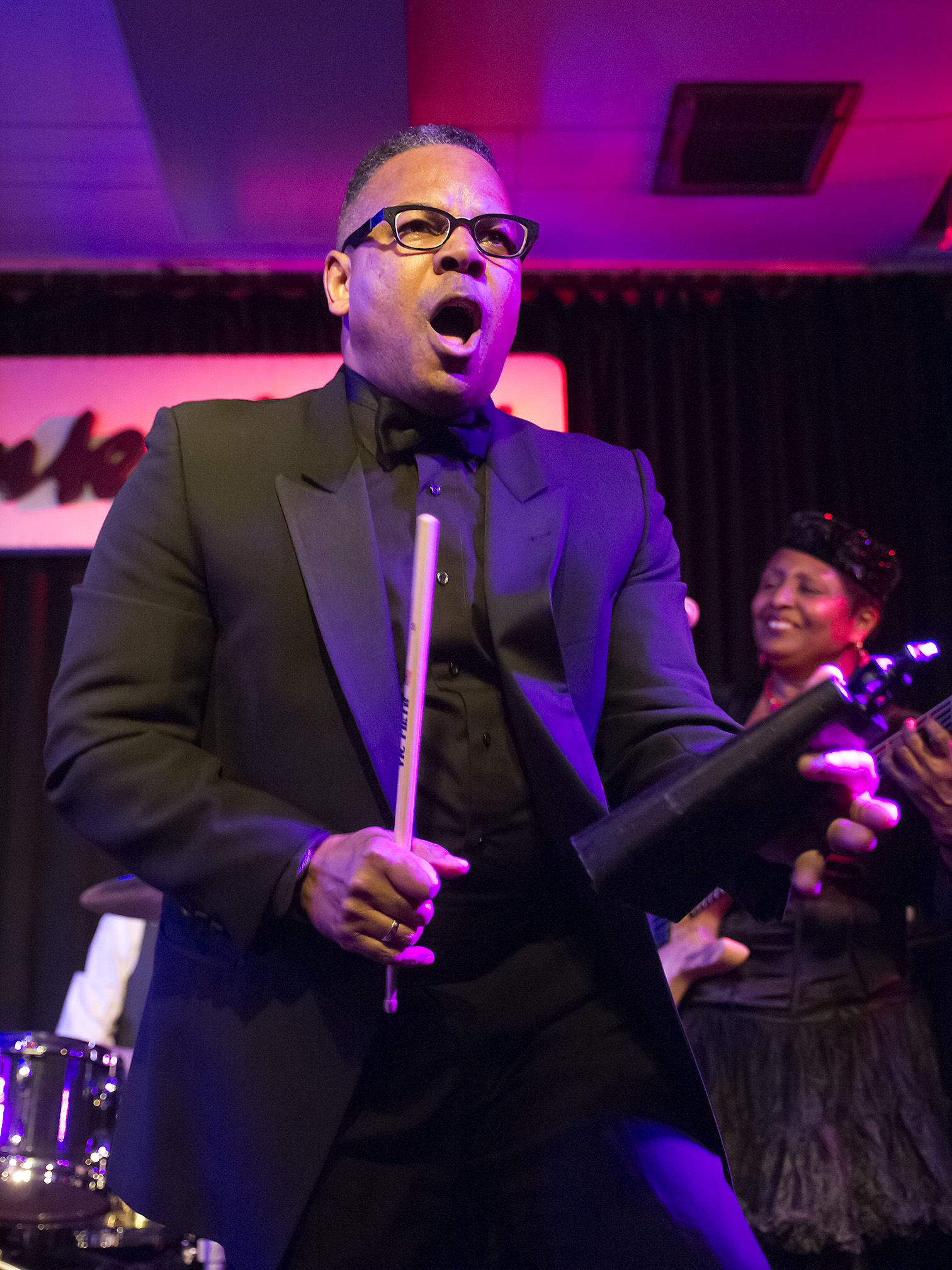
Bowie in 2012

=== As leader ===
- Heroes (DIW, 1990)

=== As sideman ===
With Lester Bowie

- 1974 Fast Last!
- 1999 American Gumbo

With James Chance

- 1981 Live in New York
- 2000 White Cannibal
- 2003 Irresistible Impulse

With Defunkt

- 1980 Defunkt
- 1982 Thermonuclear Sweat
- 1988 In America
- 1992 Crisis
- 1994 Cum Funky
- 1994 Live & Reunified
- 1994 Live at the Knitting Factory NYC
- 1995 A Blues Tribute: Jimi Hendrix & Muddy Waters
- 2015 Mastervolt
- 2016 Live at Channel Zero

With Ethnic Heritage Ensemble

- Ancestral Song (Silkheart, 1988)
- Hang Tuff (Open Minds, 1991)
- Dance with the Ancestors (Chameleon, 1993)
- 21st Century Union March (Silkheart, 1997)
- The Continuum (Delmark, 1997)
- Papa's Bounce (CIMP, 1998)
- Freedom Jazz Dance (Delmark, 1999)

With Oliver Lake

- 1975 Heavy Spirits
- 2003 Cloth
- 2017 Live at A-Space 1976

With others

- 1972 Red, Black & Green, Solidarity Unit, Inc.
- 1972 Whisper of Dharma, Human Arts Ensemble
- 1973 In Paris, Aries 1973, Black Artists Group
- 1975 For Players Only, Leroy Jenkins
- 1975 Fresh, Frank Lowe
- 1975 The Flam, Frank Lowe
- 1976 Ntu: Point from Which Creation Begins, Oliver Lake
- 1977 Streets of St. Louis, Charles Bobo Shaw
- 1992 Under the Wire, Michael Marcus
- 1993 Highlights: Live in Vienna, Vienna Art Orchestra
- 1995 Sacred Common Ground, Don Pullen
- 1997 Junk Trap, Charles Bobo Shaw
- 1999 Inspiration, Sam Rivers
- 1999 Culmination, Sam Rivers
- 2000 Beyond the Sky, Yusef Lateef
- 2001 Funky Donkey, Vols. 1 & 2, Luther Thomas
- 2002 Just Add Water, Bobby Previte
- 2002 Trance Atlantic (Boom Bop II), Jean-Paul Bourelly
- 2003 H.Con.Res.57/Treasure Box, Alan Silva
- 2007 Transmigration, Kahil El'Zabar
- 2009 Funked Up!, Candy Dulfer
