= LaClede Town =

Coordinates: 38°38′02″N 90°13′28″W

LaClede Town was a mixed-income, federally funded housing project in St. Louis, Missouri. Located near St. Louis University, it opened in 1964. It incorporated a mix of housing types and had spaces dedicated to social interaction and artistic production. It was an intentionally diverse community with respect to residents' income and race/ethnicity. This experimental urban development was "cool, hip, cheap and populated by people committed to making integration work." It became an incubator for new music, dance, poetry and other arts, especially jazz. Loyal former residents began organizing reunions in 1997.

Eventually, LaClede Town became run down, and the complex was demolished in the late 1980s. Some of the Grand Forest Apartments, a part of LaClede town, still exist as student housing for St. Louis University. Berea Presbyterian Church, which was central to the community and predated the LaClede Town development, still stands. However, it has been redesigned for commercial use.

== See also ==
- Pierre Laclède
- Missouri History Museum
