= Black Artists Group =

- Also known as: BAG
- Origin: St. Louis, Missouri, United States
- Genres: Jazz
- Years active: 1968–1972
- Past members: Julius Hemphill; Oliver Lake; J. D. Parran; LeRoi S. Shelton; Hamiet Bluiett; Luther Thomas; Baikida Carroll; Floyd LeFlore; Joseph Bowie; Bensid Thigpen; Charles "Bobo" Shaw; Arzinia Richardson; Portia Hunt; Malinke Robert Elliott; Vincent Terrell; Muthal Naidoo; Ajule (Bruce) Rutlin; Shirley LeFlore; Georgia Collins; Luisah Teish; Emilio Cruz; Oliver Lee Jackson; Harold Pudgy Attyberry; Ronnie Burrage; Billy "Hassan" Ingram

The Black Artists Group (BAG) was a multidisciplinary arts collective that existed in St. Louis, Missouri, from 1968 to 1972. BAG is known for the convergence of free jazz and experimental theater.

== Members ==
Members included saxophonists Julius Hemphill, Oliver Lake, Lester Bowie, J. D. Parran, Hamiet Bluiett, and Luther Thomas; trumpeters Baikida Carroll and Floyd LeFlore; trombonist Joseph Bowie; drummers Bensid Thigpen and Charles "Bobo" Shaw; bassist Bobby Reed, Arzinia Richardson; stage directors Malinke Robert Elliott, Vincent Terrell, and Muthal Naidoo; actors LeRoi S. Shelton; poets Ajule (Bruce) Rutlin and Shirley LeFlore; dancers Georgia Collins and Luisah Teish; and painters Emilio Cruz and Oliver Lee Jackson. While Jackson was not officially a member, he was deeply involved with BAG and is usually listed as a member. In addition, Ronnie Burrage was considered one of the youngest members (11 and 12 years old) of BAG as he began to perform with various members in 1971 and 1972.

== History ==
Members Oliver Lake, Lester Bowie, and Floyd LeFlore studied music in the jazz program at Sumner High School. They continued music education at Lincoln University alongside Julius Hemphill. Several members were drafted into military service, and all played music in St. Louis through the 1960s. Frustration with discrimination and limited opportunities brought the musical artists together with black actors marginalized from the theater scene, and they began collaborating on artistic productions around LaClede Town, the Circle Coffee Shop, and Berea Church.

While strongly influenced by Chicago's Association for the Advancement of Creative Musicians, the Black Artists Group was unique in including artists from dance, theater, visual arts, and creative writing. They incorporated as a not-for-profit organization under the name "The Black Artists' Group, Inc" in 1968. BAG received major grant funding from the Danforth Foundation and the Rockefeller Foundation. In July 1969, the group paid $1 annual rent for a building at 2665 Washington Blvd.

Many of the BAG members relocated to Paris and then New York in the 1970s. A recording of a 1973 performance in Paris was released on an LP titled In Paris, Aries 1973; it was the only album ever issued under the BAG name until the 2024 release of For Peace And Liberty, In Paris Dec 1972.

== Legacy ==
BAG inspired other groups and artistic collectives to form around the United States and influenced Chicago's Association for the Advancement of Creative Musicians.

Oliver Lake, Julius Hemphill and Hamiet Bluiett formed the African Continuum and organized the 1971 multimedia concert "Images: Sons/Ancestors" at Powell Symphony Hall, which was delayed by a bomb threat. They went on to form the World Saxophone Quartet and were notable in the "loft-jazz" scene of New York's underground in the 1980s.

== Discography ==
Albums

- In Paris, Aries 1973 (1973, self-release; reissued in 2011 and 2018)
- For Peace And Liberty, In Paris Dec 1972 (2024, Wewantsounds)

== See also ==
- Black Arts Movement
- Harlem Renaissance
- Black Artists in America
