= Four Now =

Studio album by World Saxophone Quartet
- Released: 1996
- Recorded: October 3–4, 1995
- Genre: Jazz
- Length: 54:10
- Label: Justin Time

World Saxophone Quartet chronology
| Breath of Life (1994) | Four Now (1996) | Takin' It 2 the Next Level (1996) |

Four Now is an album by the jazz group the World Saxophone Quartet, released by the Canadian Justin Time label. The album features performances by Hamiet Bluiett, John Purcell, Oliver Lake and David Murray, with guests Chief Bey, Mor Thiam, and Mar Gueye on African drums.

== Reception ==
Professional ratings
Review scores
| Source | Rating |
|---|---|
| Tom Hull | B+ |
| The Penguin Guide to Jazz Recordings | 3.5/4 stars |

The authors of The Penguin Guide to Jazz Recordings noted that, in relation to the earlier recording titled Metamorphosis, which features the same three African drummers, Four Now is "the better album because the elements seem to work together rather than in strict parallel... There are also fewer avant-garde gestures from the WSQ itself."

A reviewer for All About Jazz wrote that, in contrast with Metamorphosis, "the group explores more rhythmic freedom on Four Now, juxtaposing the cross-continental interplay of drum improvisation and horn improvisation. The results of this American-African cultural fusion are dramatically successful."

Billboard praised Purcell's contributions, commenting: "If the future of the World Saxophone Quartet was cast into doubt by the passing of Julius Hemphill, fans can now rejoice."

== Track listing ==
1. "Dou Dou N'Daiye Rose" (Gueye) - 8:42
2. "Dakar Darkness" (Lake, Murray) - 8:28
3. "Suga" (Thiam) - 6:50
4. "Colors" (Purcell) - 6:57
5. "For Now" (Bluiett) - 5:24
6. "What a Dream" (Lake) - 7:21
7. "Sangara" (Thiam) - 10:40

== Personnel ==
- Hamiet Bluiett — baritone saxophone, contra-alto clarinet
- John Purcell — saxello, alto flute, english horn, alto and C flutes
- Oliver Lake — alto saxophone, vocals
- David Murray — tenor saxophone, bass clarinet
- Chief Bey — African drums
- Mor Thiam — African drums
- Mar Gueye — African drums
