= M'Bizo =

Studio album by World Saxophone Quartet
- Released: 1999
- Recorded: November 10, 1997–June 18, 1998
- Genre: Jazz
- Length: 49:17
- Label: Justin Time
- Producer: David Murray

World Saxophone Quartet chronology
Selim Sivad: a Tribute to Miles Davis (1998)	M'Bizo (1999)	Requiem for Julius (2000)

M'Bizo is an album by American jazz group the World Saxophone Quartet released by the Canadian Justin Time label. The album features performances by Hamiet Bluiett, John Purcell, Oliver Lake and David Murray, with guests Ronnie Burrage on drums, Mario Canonge and D. D. Jackson on pianos, Mabeleng Moholo on musical bow, Jimane Nelson on organ, and James Lewis and Jaribu Shahid on basses.

== Reception ==
Professional ratings
Review scores
Source	Rating
AllMusic	4/5 stars
The Penguin Guide to Jazz Recordings	3/4 stars

The AllMusic review by Scott Yanow stated, "The singers and percussionists add to the party atmosphere which even when remembering the dark days of apartheid, sounds quite hopeful and optimistic. Well worth exploring."

The authors of The Penguin Guide to Jazz Recordings wrote that the album "is the fruit of a trip to South Africa and some very happy musical associations created there," and noted that it is dedicated to Johnny Dyani. They commented: "The three-part 'M'Bizo Suite' occupies the bulk of the record, though the opening 'Snanapo'... and 'Matsidiso'... are both powerful works."

In a review for All About Jazz, Derrick A. Smith stated: "with M'Bizo, it's as if the WSQ and their South African guests internalized the notions of Unity to the point of complete unity of performance. The entire album, true to jazz and to African music, moves like a conversive dance."

John Murph, writing for Jazz Times, commented: "M'Bizo manages to successfully absorb the multilayers of musical ideas without succumbing to pretensions... It almost goes without saying that all members of the quartet unleash wicked solos and soulful cacophony, but in recent times the funk began to stale, M'Bizo offers a different and potent stank."

== Track listing ==
All compositions by David Murray.

1. "Snanapo" - 12:21
2. "M'Bizo Suite: Africa-Europe-Asia" - 7:59
3. "M'Bizo Suite: Sizelapha" - 2:56
4. "M'Bizo Suite: M'Bizo" - 12:37
5. "Matsidiso" - 13:24

== Personnel ==
- Hamiet Bluiett — baritone saxophone, bass saxophone, contra-alto clarinet
- John Purcell — saxello
- Oliver Lake — alto saxophone
- David Murray — tenor saxophone, bass clarinet
- Ronnie Burrage — drums (on tracks 1 & 5)
- Mario Canonge — piano (on tracks 1 & 5)
- D. D. Jackson — piano (on tracks 2, 3 & 4)
- James Lewis — bass (on tracks 2, 3 & 4)
- Mabeleng Moholo — string bow (on track 1)
- Jimane Nelson — organ (on tracks 1 & 5)
- Jaribu Shahid — bass (on tracks 1 & 5)
