= Selim Sivad: A Tribute to Miles Davis =

Selim Sivad: a Tribute to Miles Davis

Studio album by World Saxophone Quartet
- Released: 1998
- Recorded: March 2–3, 1998
- Genre: Jazz
- Length: 52:42
- Label: Justin Time
- Producer: Hamiet Bluiett

World Saxophone Quartet chronology
Takin' It 2 the Next Level (1996)	Selim Sivad: a Tribute to Miles Davis (1998)	M'Bizo (1999)

Selim Sivad: The Music of Miles Davis is an album by the jazz group the World Saxophone Quartet released on the Canadian Justin Time label. The album features performances by Hamiet Bluiett, John Purcell, Oliver Lake and David Murray, with guests Jack DeJohnette, Chief Bey, Okyerema Asante, and Titos Sompa and is dedicated to Miles Davis.

== Reception ==
Professional ratings
Review scores
Source	Rating
AllMusic	4/5 stars
The Penguin Guide to Jazz Recordings	4/4 stars

The AllMusic review by Tim Sheridan stated, "While there is a plethora of Miles Davis tribute albums out there, this one is interesting for the basic fact that this horn quartet attempts to evoke his spirit without the use of a trumpet. To add spice, they employ African drums, with kalimba and voice."

The authors of The Penguin Guide to Jazz Recordings wrote: "the WSQ's take on Miles Davis's... career is cast very much in the band's own idiom... Miles's music is comprehensively rethought rather than merely pastiched... A brilliant, beautiful record."

Ed Hazell, writing for The Phoenix, stated: "There's solid blowing from everyone... WSQ works as a jazz band because every member plays like a drum, and here the presence of percussionists makes the rhythmic roots of even the most abstract moments doubly clear."

A reviewer for All About Jazz commented: "Compared to the earlier WSQ+drums records, Selim Sivad includes a greater variety of improvisational approaches... The expanded quartet expresses a clear appreciation for the wide range of styles explored by Miles Davis during his career, while endowing the (mostly) Davis compositions with its own personal touch. Of course, it's an ambitious project to interpret the works of Miles Davis using four saxophones and four drummers—but amazingly, the WSQ succeeds."

== Track listing ==
1. "Seven Steps to Heaven" (Miles Davis, Feldman) - 6:12
2. "Selim" - 7:30
3. "Freddie Freeloader" - 6:48
4. "The Road to Nefertiti" (Bluiett, Lake, Murray, Purcell) - 9:59
5. "Tutu" (Miller) - 6:52
6. "Blue in Green" - 5:31
7. "All Blues" - 9:50

All compositions by Miles Davis except as indicated.

== Personnel ==
- Hamiet Bluiett — baritone saxophone, contra-alto clarinet
- John Purcell — saxello, alto flute
- Oliver Lake — alto saxophone, flute
- David Murray — tenor saxophone, bass clarinet
- Jack DeJohnette — drums, piano
- Chief Bey — Ashiko African drums
- Okyerema Asante — African drums, percussion, kalimba
- Titos Sompa — African drums, percussion, kalimba, voice
