= Breath of Life (World Saxophone Quartet album) =

Studio album by World Saxophone Quartet
- Released: 1994
- Recorded: April & September 1992
- Genre: Jazz
- Length: 61:32
- Label: Elektra/Nonesuch
- Producer: Hamiett Bluiett

World Saxophone Quartet chronology
Moving Right Along (1992)	Breath of Life (1994)	Four Now (1995)

Breath of Life is an album by the jazz group the World Saxophone Quartet. It was recorded in 1992 and released on the Elektra/Nonesuch label in 1994 and features performances by Hamiet Bluiett, Arthur Blythe, Oliver Lake and David Murray with Fontella Bass and a rhythm section.

== Reception ==
Professional ratings
Review scores
Source	Rating
AllMusic	4/5 stars
The Penguin Guide to Jazz Recordings	3/4 stars

The AllMusic review by Al Campbell stated, "Going a step further from the previous year's experiment with African drums on Metamorphosis, Breath of Life continues to find the sax quartet stretching the boundaries associated with its acappella approach of the past".

The authors of The Penguin Guide to Jazz Recordings wrote: "Breath of Life has to be accounted an off-day in the WSQ's impressive progress. The playing is immaculate as ever, but there is a strange lack of focus in the writing, a bland equalization of voices, almost as if someone had called a truce on competing visions."

== Track listing ==
1. "Jest a Little" (Oliver Lake) – 9:14
2. "Cairo Blues" (David Murray) – 1:11
3. "Suffering with the Blues" (Conyers Temberton) – 5:39
4. "You Don't Know Me" (Eddy Arnold, Cindy Walker) – 6:35
5. "Picasso" (Murray) – 5:52
6. "Song for Camille" (Hamiett Bluiett) – 7:42
7. "Breath of Life" (Lake) – 4:43
8. "Deb" (Bluiett) – 4:43
  - Recorded at Clinton Recording Studios and Power Station in New`York City in April and September 1992

== Personnel ==
- Hamiet Bluiett — baritone saxophone, contra-alto clarinet
- Arthur Blythe — alto saxophone
- Oliver Lake — alto saxophone
- David Murray — tenor saxophone, bass clarinet
- Amina Claudine Myers — organ (tracks 1 & 6)
- Donald Smith – piano (tracks 1, 6 & 8), organ (tracks 3 & 4)
- Fred Hopkins (tracks 1 & 6), Tarik Shah (track 7) — bass
- Ronnie Burrage (tracks 1, 6 & 8), Gene Lake (tracks 4 & 7) — drums
- Fontella Bass – vocals, piano (tracks 3, 4 & 7)
