= Political Blues =

Studio album by World Saxophone Quartet
- Released: 2006
- Recorded: January 2006
- Genre: Jazz
- Length: 61:52
- Label: Justin Time
- Producer: Jamaaladeen Tacuma

World Saxophone Quartet chronology
Experience (2004)	Political Blues (2006)	Yes We Can (2010)

Political Blues is an album by the jazz group the World Saxophone Quartet released by the Canadian Justin Time label. The album features performances by Hamiet Bluiett, Jaleel Shaw, Oliver Lake and David Murray, with guests Craig Harris on trombone, Jeremy Pelt on trumpet, James "Blood" Ulmer on guitar, Jamaaladeen Tacuma (who also produced the album) on bass guitar, and Lee Pearson on drums.

== Reception ==
Professional ratings
Review scores
Source	Rating
AllMusic	4/5 stars
All About Jazz #1	4/5 stars
All About Jazz #2	4.5/5 stars

The AllMusic review by Alex Henderson awarded the album 4 stars, stating, "Political Blues' mixture of jazz, blues and funk is mildly avant-garde, but it isn't radically avant-garde -- and those who have admired WSQ's spirit of adventure will be happy to know that the saxophonists are still taking chances even at their most accessible."

In an article for Jazz Times, Steve Greenlee wrote: "The music is WSQ at its most accessible. There are jazz-funk jams, hard-swinging blues, syncopated rhythms, catchy melodies and, on half the tunes, vocals-lyrics aimed squarely at Dubya and his deputies... For all the polemics, it's the music that sustains this effort. The horns... play with stunning force; the solos scorch against a wondrous chorus of horns... Political disillusionment hasn't been this much fun since Charles Mingus and Sun Ra were writing songs about nuclear arms."

Jim Santella, writing for All About Jazz, commented: "Political Blues allows its members to communicate with a broader audience in terms that everybody can appreciate. They've incorporated the blues into their creative work in such a way that it gets right to the heart of the matter... The WSQ has departed from its funky avant-garde position, and has entered territory usually reserved for rhythm-and-blues bands... Intense and filled with passion, their music rocks hard. This time out, however, they've decided to communicate from a casual perspective that opens the door for pointed lyric messages and vital discourse. The world needs to wake up and listen." In a separate AAJ review, Karl A.D. Evangelista stated: "This is the fierce, hard spirit of jazz, a volley at the heart of dire times that tugs at the bare, black and blue roots of the music... There are seldom records like this one—for better or worse, perhaps, but few so plain and downright angry... It took the combined forces of racism, political conservatism, war, economic downturn, and unprecedented economic disaster to turn the joie de vivre of the WSQ sound into something altogether more menacing and, at times, shockingly unchecked... Many musicians have tried, but few have achieved so devastating and honest a picture of the American struggle in the 21st Century."

== Track listing ==
1. "Political Blues" (Murray) - 9:04
2. "Hal's Blues" (Murray) - 2:54
3. "Mannish Boy" (Morganfield) - 7:26
4. "Let's Have Some Fun" (Lake) - 7:23
5. "Amazin' Disgrace" (Bluiett) - 5:55
6. "Bluocracy, Part 1" (Harris) - 5:03
7. "Bluocracy, Part 2" (Harris) - 2:21
8. "Bluocracy, Part 3" (Harris) - 3:44
9. "Blue Diamond" (Pearson, Tacuma) - 4:41
10. "Harlem" (Harris) - 7:27
11. "Spy on Me Blues" (Lake) - 5:54

== Personnel ==
- Hamiet Bluiett — baritone saxophone, contra-alto clarinet
- Jaleel Shaw — alto saxophone, soprano saxophone
- Oliver Lake — alto saxophone, flute
- David Murray — tenor saxophone, bass clarinet
- Craig Harris — trombone
- Jamaaladeen Tacuma — electric bass
- Lee Pearson — drums
- Jeremy Pelt — trumpet
- James Blood Ulmer — guitar, vocals
- Herve Samb — guitar
