= 25th Anniversary: The New Chapter =

Studio album by World Saxophone Quartet
- Released: 2001
- Recorded: May 19–22, 2000
- Genre: Jazz
- Length: 51:31
- Label: Justin Time

World Saxophone Quartet chronology
| Requiem for Julius (2000) | 25th Anniversary: The New Chapter (2001) | Steppenwolf (2002) |

25th Anniversary: The New Chapter is an album by the jazz group the World Saxophone Quartet released by the Canadian Justin Time label. The album features performances and compositions by Hamiet Bluiett, John Purcell, Oliver Lake and David Murray.

== Reception ==
Professional ratings
Review scores
| Source | Rating |
|---|---|
| AllMusic | 4/5 stars |
| Tom Hull | B |
| The Penguin Guide to Jazz | 3.5/4 stars |

The AllMusic review by Paula Edelstein stated, "This is the WSQ's sixth recording for the Justin Time label and exceeds the listening possibilities and interpretations of their Takin' It 2 the Next Level CD because of their extensive range of approaches, new sonorities, hi-tech themes, and the overdubbing experimentation." The Penguin Guide to Jazz stated that this and Requiem for Julius were "perhaps the most accessible recordings by the group".

Derek Taylor, writing for All About Jazz, commented: "The music on hand for the improvisatory jubilee is a cross-section of the quartet's influences and usual repertoire... With this record the WSQ has proven once again as all of their past documents have that jazz is not a music beholden to any set instrumentation, that the feeling can be conveyed by any combination of voices properly wielded. Their longevity is cause for celebration to be sure." Another AAJ reviewer wrote: "With a combined eight decades of shared experience, the members of the WSQ have an amazing degree of cohesion. They constantly teeter on the balance between arranged parts and full-on improvisation, knowing intuitively when to hold back and when to unleash their collective energy... This disc offers special rewards to listeners interested in the possibilities available through pure saxophone sound. With the amazing tonal and timbral range available to these four players, 25th Anniversary presents proof that maturity can indeed be a valuable asset."

== Track listing ==
| No. | Title | Writer(s) | Length |
|---|---|---|---|
| 1. | "Suki Suki Now" | Murray | 11:11 |
| 2. | "Netdown" | Lake | 3:43 |
| 3. | "Bit's N' Pieces" | Bluiett | 3:29 |
| 4. | "Goin' Home" | Traditional, arranged Murray | 5:59 |
| 5. | "Over a Cloud (Sobre Una Nube)" | Bluiett | 9:11 |
| 6. | "Stock" | Lake | 5:55 |
| 7. | "The New Chapter" | Purcell | 12:06 |

== Personnel ==
- Hamiet Bluiett — baritone saxophone
- John Purcell — alto saxophone
- Oliver Lake — alto saxophone
- David Murray — tenor saxophone
