= Requiem for Julius =

Studio album by World Saxophone Quartet
- Released: 2000
- Recorded: 1999
- Genre: Jazz
- Length: 55:52
- Label: Justin Time
- Producer: Hamiet Bluiett

World Saxophone Quartet chronology
M'Bizo (1999)	Requiem for Julius (2000)	25th Anniversary: The New Chapter (2001)

Requiem for Julius is an album by the jazz group the World Saxophone Quartet, released by the Justin Time label. The album features performances by Hamiet Bluiett, John Purcell, Oliver Lake and David Murray and is dedicated to the band's founding member Julius Hemphill.

== Reception ==
Professional ratings
Review scores
Source	Rating
AllMusic	4/5 stars
The Penguin Guide to Jazz Recordings	3.5/4 stars

The AllMusic review by Michael G. Nastos stated: "A long-overdue official farewell for Hemphill, Requiem for Julius not only harkens back to the sound of WSQ's initial recordings, but indicates that they have plenty of original music left in the tank."

The authors of The Penguin Guide to Jazz Recordings wrote: "Not just for their connection with the WSQ's past, this and the 25th-anniversary record are perhaps the most accessible recordings by the group and they are certainly a good place to start."

All About Jazz's Glenn Astarita commented: "Requiem For Julius is a truly exceptional homage to the late great saxophonist/composer... a durable, multidimensional, fervent and altogether superfine recollection of the late great Julius Hemphill and undoubtedly one of the finest WSQ recordings in recent years. Highly recommended!" Another AAJ reviewer stated: "The quartet... invokes its remarkable ability to trade off between tight arrangements and free improvisation. In fact, it's often hard to tell where the arrangements leave off and the improvisation begins."

== Track listing ==
1. "Ebony" (DeJohnette) - 7:45
2. "Free and Independent Thought" (Bluiett) - 3:01
3. "All Praise" (Purcell) - 5:57
4. "Requiem for Julius" (Murray) - 6:46
5. "Le Sport Suite" (Lake) - 7:50
6. "Hurricane Floyd" (Murray) - 10:46
7. "Potato Vamp" (Lake) - 3:42
8. "Tone Poem" (Lake) - 5:54
9. "Blues" (Bluiett, Lake, Murray, Purcell) - 4:11

== Personnel ==
- Hamiet Bluiett — baritone saxophone
- John Purcell — alto saxophone
- Oliver Lake — alto saxophone
- David Murray — tenor saxophone
