= Experience (World Saxophone Quartet album) =

Studio album by World Saxophone Quartet
- Released: 2004
- Recorded: March 13–15, 2003
- Genre: Jazz
- Length: 57:01
- Label: Justin Time

World Saxophone Quartet chronology
Steppenwolf (2000)	Experience (2004)	Political Blues (2006)

Experience is an album by the jazz group the World Saxophone Quartet, released by the Canadian Justin Time label. The album features performances by Hamiet Bluiett, Oliver Lake, David Murray and Bruce Williams, with guests Craig Harris on trombone, Billy Bang on violin, Matthew Garrison on bass and Gene Lake on drums, and features the music of, and is dedicated to, Jimi Hendrix.

== Reception ==
Professional ratings
Review scores
Source	Rating
AllMusic	4/5 stars
The Penguin Guide to Jazz Recordings	3/4 stars

The AllMusic review by Alex Henderson stated, "Some die-hard Hendrix lovers might nitpick about the absence of their personal favorites -- perhaps "Purple Haze," perhaps "Voodoo Child (Slight Return)" or "Castles Made of Sand"; regardless, Experience is an excellent CD that finds the WSQ still going strong 26 years after its formation."

The authors of The Penguin Guide to Jazz Recordings wrote: "We wondered how long it would be before the WSQ tackled the Jimi Hendrix songbook. Here it is, fresh, brash and sophisticated in exactly the proportions you would expect."

In a review for Jazz Times, Mike Shanley stated: "the WSQ approaches the material with their usual reverence and sense of adventure... Throughout the album all four members get plenty of spotlight time... Once again, the World Saxophone Quartet has taken a bold concept and exceeded expectations."

Kurt Gottschalk, writing for All About Jazz, commented: "Experience is a rewarding, if uneven album... the album doesn't quite work as a piece, but the individual tracks still succeed." In a separate AAJ review, Phil DiPietro remarked: "Quick, name another sax quartet that's done Jimi at all, let alone this well. Now name a rock artist whose sonic mayhem lends itself better to the WSQ's particular brand of...sonic mayhem." AAJ's Jim Santella stated that the group's "music lets you escape from a humdrum routine and from all the usual sources for worry. With this Experience, you're in for a world class treat."

In an article for SF Weekly, Sam Prestianni described the album as "a collection of spot-on yet wildly personal takes on the guitarist's tunes," and commented: "The members of the World Saxophone Quartet clearly understand the still-beating heart of this music. Their forward-jazz interpretations of Hendrix's beloved songbook feel like a natural evolution, a long-overdue fruition, a homecoming. These players get what Hendrix was about."

== Track listing ==
1. "Freedom" - 7:14
2. "If 6 Was 9" - 5:20
3. "Hey Joe" (Roberts) - 7:10
4. "Machine Gun" - 8:02
5. "Little Wing" - 7:34
6. "Foxy Lady" - 5:29
7. "Hear My Train a Comin'" - 8:34
8. "The Wind Cries Mary"- 7:38

All compositions by Jimi Hendrix except as indicated.

== Personnel ==
- Hamiet Bluiett — baritone saxophone
- Bruce Williams — alto saxophone, soprano saxophone
- Oliver Lake — alto saxophone, soprano saxophone
- David Murray — tenor saxophone, bass clarinet
- Craig Harris — trombone, didgeridoo
- Billy Bang — violin
- Matthew Garrison — electric bass
- Gene Lake — drums
