= Sweet D =

Sweet D may refer to:

- Dennis DuVal (born 1954), an American basketball player
- Walter Davis (basketball) (1954–2023), an American basketball player
- "Sweet D", a jazz track by the World Saxophone Quartet from their 1998 album Dances and Ballads

== See also ==
- Deandra Reynolds, nicknamed "Sweet Dee", a character from It's Always Sunny in Philadelphia
