= Takin' It 2 the Next Level =

Studio album by World Saxophone Quartet
- Released: 1996
- Recorded: June 10–12, 1996
- Genre: Jazz
- Length: 66:46
- Label: Justin Time
- Producer: World Saxophone Quartet

World Saxophone Quartet chronology
Four Now (1996)	Takin' It 2 the Next Level (1996)	Selim Sivad: A Tribute to Miles Davis (1998)

Takin' It 2 the Next Level is an album by the jazz group the World Saxophone Quartet released by the Canadian Justin Time label. The album features performances by Hamiet Bluiett, John Purcell, Oliver Lake and David Murray, with a rhythm section of Don Blackman, Calvin X Jones and Ronnie Burrage.

== Reception ==
Professional ratings
Review scores
Source	Rating
AllMusic	3/5 stars
Tom Hull	B
The Penguin Guide to Jazz Recordings	3/4 stars

The AllMusic review by Scott Yanow stated, "Mostly sticking to group originals, the expanded band explores many moods on such numbers as "Wiring," "Rio," "The Desegregation of Our Children" and "When Thee Monarchs Come to Town."

The authors of The Penguin Guide to Jazz Recordings wrote: "The results are typically spirited and entirely within the WSQ tradition," but cautioned: "it's hard to avoid the feeling that the group is not continuing out of any artistic necessity."

Billboard commented: "For the World Saxophone Quartet... the 'next level' expands its sound beyond accompanying percussion... Yet even these... additions couldn't change the wild, reedy nature of this ground-breaking ensemble."

== Track listing ==
1. "Wiring" (Lake) - 6:28
2. "Soft Landing" (Lake) - 1:11
3. "Rio" (Lake) - 7:30
4. "The Peace Before" (Blackman) - 1:23
5. "Blues for a Warrior Spirit" (Bluiett) - 13:08
6. "The Desegregation of Our Children" (Murray) - 12:35
7. "When the Monarchs Come to Town" (Murray) - 2:51
8. "Endless Flight" (Burrage) - 7:35
9. "Ballad After Us" (Purcell) - 4:36
10. "Australopithecus" (Antonio Underwood) - 9:29

== Personnel ==
- Hamiet Bluiett — baritone saxophone, contra-alto clarinet
- John Purcell — saxello, alto flute, English horn, alto and C flutes
- Oliver Lake — alto saxophone, vocals
- David Murray — tenor saxophone, bass clarinet
- Donald Blackman — keyboards
- Calvin X Jones — bass
- Ronnie Burrage — drums
