= Steppenwolf (World Saxophone Quartet album) =

Live album by World Saxophone Quartet
- Released: 2002
- Recorded: March 1, 1999
- Genre: Jazz
- Length: 72:44
- Label: Justin Time
- Producer: Hamiet Bluiett

World Saxophone Quartet chronology
25th Anniversary: The New Chapter (2001)	Steppenwolf (2002)	Experience (2004)

Steppenwolf is an album by the jazz group the World Saxophone Quartet, released by the Justin Time label. The album features a live performance by Hamiet Bluiett, John Purcell, Oliver Lake and David Murray and was recorded at the Steppenwolf Theatre in Chicago on March 1, 1999. This was Purcell's final album with the group.

== Reception ==
Professional ratings
Review scores
Source	Rating
AllMusic	4/5 stars
The Penguin Guide to Jazz Recordings	4/4 stars

The AllMusic review by David R. Adler stated, "Bluiett's 'Hattie Wall', the WSQ theme song, concludes the program with boogying showmanship. Recommended."

The authors of The Penguin Guide to Jazz Recordings called the album "the one we would most strongly recommend," and wrote: "This was the night when Purcell finally sounded like a permanent and unmoveable component of the quartet." They described the quartet's performance of "Giant Steps" as "a career high-point."

In a review for Jazz Times, Bill Bennett commented: "The word virtuoso comes to mind and quickly falls short of the mark in characterizing the ineffable totality of the World Saxophone Quartet... John Purcell... has brought stability and a creative spark to the chair vacated by Julius Hemphill a decade ago... The Quartet's rendering of Coltrane's 'Giant Steps'... asserts its claim to a very high spot in the ranks of collective improvisation."

Jim Santella, writing for All About Jazz, remarked: "Each of the four artists has something vital to offer... Emotions run high throughout the performance, and their music has never sounded better. Highly recommended, this one is yet another thrilling episode from a superb unit." Another AAJ reviewer wrote: "Steppenwolf offers a refreshing contrast to much of the quartet's studio work: it documents a live performance. For such a finely tuned machine, this change is akin to taking the Ferrari off the racetrack and setting it loose on the open road... Steppenwolf is a fine record indeed... most definitely up to the very high standards this group has set over the last quarter century."

== Track listing ==
1. "Intro" - 1:05
2. "The Crossing" (Murray) - 12:39
3. "Intro" - 2:07
4. "Li'l Poki" (Purcell) - 15:23
5. "Intro" - 0:27
6. "Sunrise (Brazilian Sunshine)" (Mahal) - 9:14
7. "Giant Steps" (Coltrane) - 3:15
8. "Intro" - 0:13
9. "Color for Duke" (Bluiett) - 8:34
10. "Intro" - 0:35
11. "Toré" (Purcell) - 6:08
12. "What If" (Lake) - 9:29
13. "Hattie Wall (Theme Song)" (Bluiett) - 3:35

== Personnel ==
- Hamiet Bluiett — baritone saxophone
- John Purcell — alto saxophone
- Oliver Lake — alto saxophone
- David Murray — tenor saxophone
