= Talkin' Stick =

Studio album by Oliver Lake
- Released: 2000
- Recorded: March 4, 1997
- Studio: Tedesco, Paramus, New Jersey
- Genre: Jazz
- Length: 73:28
- Label: Pasin' Thru
- Producer: Richard Franklin, Oliver Lake

Oliver Lake chronology
Movement, Turns & Switches (1997)	Talkin' Stick (2000)	Kinda' Up (2000)

Talkin' Stick is an album by American jazz saxophonist Oliver Lake, recorded in 1997 and released on Lake's own Passin' Thru label. It features a quintet with vibraphonist Jay Hoggard, pianist Geri Allen, bassist Belden Bullock and drummer Cecil Brooks III, playing six Lake's originals, Julius Hemphill's composition "Hard Blues", and the piece "Only If You Live There" by Curtis Clark.

== Reception ==
Professional ratings
Review scores
Source	Rating
AllMusic	4/5 stars
The Penguin Guide to Jazz	3.5/4 stars

In his review for AllMusic, David Dupont states: "Talkin' Stick puts the versatile Oliver Lake into what could pass for a conventional hard bop quintet. However, with Lake's full-throated alto as the primary voice, there's little that's business-as-usual about this date."

The Penguin Guide to Jazz wrote: "The partnership of alto and vibes will inevitably make some listeners think of Dolphy's Out to Lunch!, and the connection is definitely there. Fortunately, the material is so strong and the group so well suited to the project that the results are high quality."

== Track listing ==
All compositions by Oliver Lake except as indicated

1. "Talkin' Stick" – 7:17
2. "Hard Blues" (Julius Hemphill) – 8:50
3. "Reminds Me" – 7:22
4. "Massai Moves" – 12:15
5. "Only If You Live There" (Curtis Clark) – 6:57
6. "Shifts" – 8:54
7. "Song for Jay" – 9:07
8. "Philly Blues" – 12:41

== Personnel ==
- Oliver Lake – alto saxophone
- Jay Hoggard – vibraphone
- Geri Allen – piano
- Belden Bullock – bass
- Cecil Brooks III – drums
