= Resolution (Hamiet Bluiett album) =

Studio album by Hamiet Bluiett
- Released: 1977
- Recorded: November 1977
- Genre: Jazz
- Length: 40:58
- Label: Black Saint
- Producer: Giacomo Pellicciotti

Hamiet Bluiett chronology
Birthright (1977)	Resolution (1977)	Dangerously Suite (1981)

Resolution is an album by American jazz saxophonist Hamiet Bluiett recorded in 1977 for the Italian Black Saint label.

== Reception ==
The Allmusic review awarded the album 3 stars.

Professional ratings
Review scores
Source	Rating
Allmusic	3/5 stars
The Penguin Guide to Jazz Recordings	3.5/4 stars

== Track listing ==
All compositions by Hamiet Bluiett except as indicated

1. "Happy Spirit" - 14:35
2. "Flux/A Bad M.F." - 6:32
3. "Head Drake" - 7:50
4. "Before Yesterday" (Bluiett, Fred Hopkins, Billy Hart, Don Moye) - 5:16
5. "Spring's Joy" - 4:47
6. "Mahalia...No Other One" (Bluiett, Don Pullen) - 1:58

- Recorded at Generation Sound Studios in New York City in November 1977

== Personnel ==
- Hamiet Bluiett - baritone saxophone, clarinet, flute, bamboo flute
- Don Pullen - piano, organ
- Fred Hopkins - bass
- Billy Hart - drums, percussion
- Don Moye - Sun percussion
