= John Purcell (musician) =

American jazz musician

John Raymond Purcell (born May 8, 1952, New York City) is an American jazz saxophonist.

== Biography ==
Purcell was raised in Westchester, New York, where he started on French horn before switching to saxophone. He attended the Manhattan School of Music, achieving his master's degree in 1978, then formed a 22-piece ensemble based in Westchester; Frank Foster co-led the ensemble for a time. In 1975 Purcell developed a tumor on his larynx, which prevented him from playing for a year; he devoted this time to studying instrument design.

In the late 1970s and early 1980s Purcell worked freelance in many local New York ensembles and in Broadway pit orchestras. He played with Machito's Afro-Cuban Big Band, Chico Hamilton, Sam Rivers, Onaje Allen Gumbs (1983), Muhal Richard Abrams (1983–90), He recorded with the Roger Dawson septet featuring Hilton Ruiz piano, Claudio Roditi trumpet, John Betsch drums, percussionist Milton Cardona and bassist Anthony Cox(1983). American Jazz Orchestra (1985–91), Third Kind of Blue with Ronnie Burrage and again with another date for Anthony Cox (1984–87), Tania Maria (1984), Henry Butler (1987) He did work as a consultant for film and television shows in the 1980s and 1990s, and appears in the 1985 film The Cotton Club.

Unlike many reed players, Purcell is proficient on virtually all the reeds from piccolo, bass clarinet, flute, alto flute, oboe, tenor, alto and soprano saxes, a great reader who is also an original improvisor which made him a natural to replace Julius Hemphill in "The World Saxophone Quartet" when Hemphill left the group due to illness. Purcell was also a part of Jack DeJohnette's Special Edition This group also helped the careers of many lesser-known young horn players, as it had a rotating front line that included Purcell, David Murray, Arthur Blythe, Chico Freeman, and bassist Rufus Reid.

Purcell has taught at Westchester Conservatory (1970–80), Dwight Morrow High School (1976–79), Lehman College (1985–89), Rutgers (1987–90) and the Manhattan School of Music (1987–94). He also taught Jazz and World Music at the California State University at Monterey Bay in Seaside, California during the late 90s.

== Discography ==
=== As leader ===
- 1994: John Purcell & Sweeca: Trent Song
- 1995: John Purcell (Mapleshade)
- 1998: Saxello Christmas in Vienna
- 1999: Little Ray of Sunshine

=== As sideman ===
With Muhal Richard Abrams

- Colors in Thirty-Third (Black Saint, 1986)
- The Hearinga Suite (Black Saint, 1989)

With Henry Butler

- The Village (Impulse!, 1987)

With Benny Carter

- Central City Sketches (MusicMasters, 1987)

With Jack DeJohnette

- Tin Can Alley (ECM, 1980),
- Album Album (ECM, 1984),
- Inflation Blues (ECM, 1982)

With Dennis González

- Stefan (Silkheart, 1987)

With Julius Hemphill

- The Boyé Multi-National Crusade for Harmony (New World, 2021)

With Meco

- Star Wars And Other Galactic Funk (Millennium, 1977)

With David Murray

- Live at Sweet Basil Volume 1 (Black Saint, 1984)
- Live at Sweet Basil Volume 2 (Black Saint, 1984)
- David Murray Big Band (DIW, 1991),
- South of the Border (DIW, 1992)

With David Sanborn

- Upfront (Elektra, 1992)
- Hearsay (Elektra, 1995)
- Pearls (Elektra, 1995)

With Jarek Śmietana

- Out Of The Question (Not Two Records, 2001)

With World Saxophone Quartet

- Four Now (Justin Time, 1995)
- Takin' It 2 the Next Level (Justin Time, 1996)
- Selim Sivad: a Tribute to Miles Davis (Justin Time, 1998)
- Requiem for Julius (Justin Time, 2000)
- 25th Anniversary: The New Chapter (Justin Time, 2001)
- Steppenwolf (Justin Time, 2002)
