= Revue (album) =

Studio album by World Saxophone Quartet
- Released: 1982
- Recorded: October 14, 1980
- Genre: Jazz
- Length: 44:13
- Label: Black Saint

World Saxophone Quartet chronology
| W.S.Q. (1980) | Revue (1982) | Live in Zurich (1983) |

Revue is an album by the jazz group the World Saxophone Quartet released on the Italian Black Saint label. The album features performances and compositions by Hamiet Bluiett, Julius Hemphill, Oliver Lake and David Murray.

== Reception ==
Professional ratings
Review scores
| Source | Rating |
|---|---|
| AllMusic | 4/5 stars |
| Tom Hull | B+ |
| The Penguin Guide to Jazz Recordings | 3.5/4 stars |
| The Rolling Stone Jazz Record Guide | 5/5 stars |

The AllMusic review by Scott Yanow stated: "The nine numbers on this set are generally concise (only two songs exceed six minutes) and consist of originals by all four saxophonists... Sometimes quite rhythmic (and almost danceable) despite not having a rhythm section, the WSQ used melodies and rhythm for their own purposes, creating unpredictable music that always holds one's attention. This release is a good example of their talents."

The authors of The Penguin Guide to Jazz Recordings wrote that, in relation to the group's previous albums, "with Revue... the centre of gravity shifts slightly towards rising star Murray and towards what looks like a reassessment of the group's development."

Writing for JazzTimes, Michael J. West stated that the album "contains music that was unquestionably avant-garde but also remarkably accessible. Hemphill's title track and Bluiett's 'I Heard That' offer sly (rhythm and) blues grooves; 'Slide' swings as hard as anything can without a rhythm section; and even meditations like Murray's 'Ming' and Lake's 'Hymn for the Old Year' have surprising hooks in them. If loft jazz remains something of an obscurity, its aftermath is indelible."

== Track listing ==
1. "Revue" (Hemphill) - 8:00
2. "Affairs of the Heart" (Hemphill) - 5:40
3. "Slide" (Hemphill) - 3:41
4. "Little Samba" (Hemphill) - 5:26
5. "I Heard That" (Bluiett) - 3:23
6. "Hymn for the Old Year" (Lake) - 4:24
7. "Ming" (Murray) - 4:21
8. "David's Tune" (Murray) - 8:15
9. "Quinn Chapel A.M. E Church" (Bluiett) - 1:03

== Personnel ==
- Hamiet Bluiett — baritone saxophone
- Julius Hemphill — alto saxophone
- Oliver Lake — alto saxophone
- David Murray — tenor saxophone
