= Chief Bey =

American jazz musician and African folklorist

- Born: James Hawthorne Bey; April 17, 1913; Yemassee, South Carolina
- Died: April 8, 2004 (aged 90); Brooklyn, New York
- Occupations: Baritone opera singer; jazz and African drummer
- Notable work: Chief Bey & Ife Olofi, Taboo Chief Bey and his Royal Household 1959, Congo Percussion 1960, Hamiet Bluiett Dangerous Suite
- Website: www.africandanceaz.org

James Hawthorne (April 17, 1913 – April 8, 2004), also known as James Hawthorne Bey and Chief Bey, was an American jazz percussionist and vocalist, a visual artist and folklorist of African traditions. He was also ordained in Nigeria as a Shango Priest.

== Early life and education ==
Born James Hawthorne in Yemassee, South Carolina, on April 17, 1913, Bey moved with his family to Brooklyn and then to Harlem, where he began playing drums and singing in church choirs.

He also served in both the Army and Navy and during World War II. He attended cosmetology school.

== Career ==
In the 1950s, Chief Bey performed in an international tour of Porgy and Bess along with his wife Louise Hawthorne, starring Leontyne Price and Cab Calloway. He also began a busy recording career, performing with flautist Herbie Mann's At the Village Gate (1961), Art Blakey's The African Beat (1962), Ahmed Abdul-Malik's Sounds of Africa (New Jazz, 1961), as well as albums by Harry Belafonte, Miriam Makeba, Miriam Greaves and Pharoah Sanders, among others.

He took his stage name after joining the Moorish Science Temple of America, a Muslim sect whose practitioners often add the suffix "Bey" to their names. Then he taught the shékéré, a West African gourd percussion instrument, at the Griot Institute at Intermediate School 246 in Brooklyn. He performed on Baba Olatunji albums as a vocalist and played African drums and Percussion, Agbé/large Shékéré, Agogo/Bells. As a drum maker, he invented the No Whole Tension Technique of roping skin onto drums.

He worked with Count Basie, Duke Ellington, Nina Simone, Geoffrey Holder, Randy Weston, Reggie Workman, Sonny Morgan, Mongo Santamaria, Eddie Palmieri, and John Coltrane. He was a singer in the original musical Porgy & Bess, along with his wife, soprano opera singer Louise Hawthorne. Chief Bey was principal drummer for Baba Olatunji, Bernice Johnson, the Clark Center for the Performing Arts, and Alvin Ailey American Dance Theater. He was also principal musician for the Broadway musical Timbuktu, and drummer for Trailblazer, Pearl Primus, and Katherine Dunham.

In later life, he taught the shekere at the Griot Institute at Intermediate School 246 in Brooklyn.

== Personal life and death ==
He married Louise Hawthorne, soprano opera singer and they had three children.

James Hawthorne died of stomach cancer on April 8, 2004 in his Brooklyn home, at the age of 90.

His common-law wife Barbara Kenyatta was a priestess of Yémaya in the Yoruba religion. She collapsed and died four days later.

== Discography ==
=== As leader ===
- Children of the House of God (Mapleshade, 1997)

=== As sideman ===
With Hamiet Bluiett

- Orchestra, Duo & Septet (Chiaroscuro, 1977)
- Dangerously Suite (Soul Note, 1981)
- Nali Kola (Soul Note, 1989)
- Bearer of the Holy Flame (Black Fire, 1994)
- Bluiett's Barbeque Band (Mapleshade, 1996)
- Live at Carlos 1 (Just a Memory, 1997)
- Live at Carlos 1: Another Night (Just a Memory, 1997)
- Live at Carlos 1: Last Night (Just a Memory, 1998)

With Babatunde Olatunji

- Zungo! (Columbia, 1961)
- High Life! (Columbia, 1963)
- Drums! Drums! Drums! (Roulette, 1964)

With others

- Ahmed Abdul-Malik, Sounds of Africa (New Jazz, 1962)
- Ray Barretto, Mysterious Instinct (Charlie Parker, 1962)
- Harry Belafonte & Miriam Makeba, An Evening with Belafonte/Makeba (RCA Victor, 1965)
- Art Blakey, The African Beat (Blue Note, 1962)
- Solomon Ilori, African High Life (Blue Note, 1963)
- Herbie Mann, Herbie Mann at the Village Gate (Atlantic, 1962)
- Herbie Mann, Herbie Mann Returns to the Village Gate (Atlantic, 1963)
- Miriam Makeba, Makeba Sings! (RCA Victor, 1965)
- Howard Roberts, Lord Shango (Bryan, 1975)
- Pharoah Sanders, Thembi (ABC Impulse!, 1971)
- Pharoah Sanders, Izipho Zam (My Gifts) (Strata-East, 1973)
- Warren Smith, Cats Are Stealing My $hit (Mapleshade, 1998)
- Guy Warren, Themes for African Drums (RCA Victor, 1959)
- Randy Weston, Khepera (Verve, 1998)
- Judd Woldin, Raisin (Columbia, 1973)
- World Saxophone Quartet, Metamorphosis (Elektra Nonesuch, 1991)
- World Saxophone Quartet, Selim Sivad. Tribute to Miles Davis with African Drums (Justin Time, 1998)
