= Eugène Albert =

Belgian instrument maker (1816–1890)

Eugène Albert (April 26, 1816 – May 11, 1890) was a Belgian woodwind instrument maker, primarily known for his clarinets, based in Brussels. His work started around 1839, and his sons, Jean-Baptiste (1845–99), Jacques (1849–1918), and E.J. Albert, continued making clarinets until the end of the World War I. The model of clarinet he made is still widely known, especially in the U.S., as the "Albert system", although this model is basically the same as Iwan Müller's 13-key instrument, with the addition of some improvements inspired in his tutor, Adolphe Sax. Sax was the first to use ring keys on the clarinet. In 1840 he made an improvement in Iwan Müller's 13-key clarinet, adding two rings, or brille (glasses), to the lower joint. This resulted in the 13 keys / 2 rings clarinet. In the same year, Albert, based on Müller modifications and Adolphe Sax's rings created a new keywork system, adding more two rings to the upper joint, resulting in a 13 keys / 4 rings clarinet. His instruments are reported have had "better tone and intonation than Boehm models of the time".

Albert's instruments were very well made, and finely tuned. His clarinets were very popular in England, where the leading clarinettist of the time, Henry Lazarus, owned eight of Albert's instruments. When Boosey & Co. (now Boosey & Hawkes) decided to begin making clarinets, Albert was brought to London as a consultant.

Eugène Albert's instruments were almost all made for high pitch, A'=c452, meaning that after World War I few professional clarinettists played them. His son, E. J. Albert, made a range of models in A'=440, meaning that his reputation lasted far after his death, and his instruments were played up until the end of the 20th century. Probably it was E. J. Albert, and not Eugène, who about 1890 built an early contra-alto clarinet in F.

== See also ==
- Clarinet makers
