= Mapleshade Records =

American independent record label

- Founded: 1990
- Founder: Pierre Sprey
- Genre: Jazz, blues, gospel, classical
- Country of origin: United States
- Location: Baltimore, Maryland
- Official website: www.mapleshaderecords.com

Mapleshade Records is an American jazz record company and independent record label founded by Pierre Sprey in Upper Marlboro, Maryland, United States, in 1990. Sprey claimed his recording techniques at Mapleshade aimed to record in a way that physically mimicked what would be heard by a person listening in an ideal location and having little manipulation of the recorded signals.

Mapleshade's catalogue includes Bobby Battle, Gary Bartz, Walter Davis, Clifford Jordan, Frank Kimbrough, and Norris Turney. Sprey, an electronics enthusiast, built his equipment and has a recording studio in his house. At one time, Hamiet Bluiett and Larry Willis were artists and repertoire (A&R) men for the company. Both musicians recorded albums as leaders for the label. A recording with the Addicts Rehabilitation Center (ARC) Choir singing "Walk With Me" produced by Mapleshade Records appears in Kanye West's 2004 hit "Jesus Walks". Sprey said he earned enough royalties from the West song "to support 30 of my money-losing jazz albums."

A sister label, Wildchild Records, was founded in 1995. In later years the label branched into R&B and blues.

== Roster ==
- Steve Abshire
- Douglas Allanbrook
- Okyerema Asante
- Gary Bartz
- Bobby Battle
- Keter Betts
- Hamiet Bluiett
- Walter Davis Jr.
- Archie Edwards
- Frank Foster
- John Hicks
- Shirley Horn
- Clifford Jordan
- Frank Kimbrough
- Danny Knicely
- Consuela Lee
- Paul Murphy
- Ted Nash
- Bob Northern
- John Purcell
- Tao Ruspoli
- Gali Sanchez
- Kendra Shank
- Warren Smith
- Sunny Sumper
- Norris Turney
- Charles Williams
- Larry Willis
