= Yes We Can (album) =

Live album by World Saxophone Quartet
- Released: 2010
- Recorded: March 28, 2009
- Venue: Kino Babylon, Berlin
- Genre: Jazz
- Label: Jazzwerkstatt; 098

World Saxophone Quartet chronology
Political Blues (2006)	Yes We Can (2010)

Yes We Can is a live album by the jazz group the World Saxophone Quartet. It features Hamiet Bluiett on baritone saxophone, James Carter on soprano and tenor saxophones, Kidd Jordan on alto saxophone, and David Murray on tenor saxophone and bass clarinet. The album was recorded on March 28, 2009, at Kino Babylon in Berlin, and was released in 2010 by Jazzwerkstatt.

== Reception ==
Professional ratings
Review scores
Source	Rating
AllMusic	3.5/5 stars
The Guardian	3/5 stars
PopMatters	7/10 stars
Financial Times	3/5 stars

In a review for AllMusic, William Ruhlmann wrote: "Bluiett holds down the rhythm and the bottom, allowing fellow founding member David Murray and his compatriots to take off... Like competing ghosts of John Coltrane, they sometimes achieve near cacophony in spots, occasionally seeming to imitate the sound of a herd of angry elephants... World Saxophone Quartet is always a challenging listen... but the results can be exhilarating, and they seem to be to the enthusiastic audience that whoops and hollers at this show."

Bill Milkowski, writing for Jazz Times, stated: "In this two-tenor onslaught, Murray and Carter can hardly be distinguished, especially when they launch into simultaneous altissimo flights... Murray's title track, recorded just two months after President Obama's inauguration, is a soulful fanfare brimming with optimism that highlights Carter's uncanny virtuosity on soprano."

In a review for the Financial Times, Mike Hobart called the recording a "blast of optimism," and commented: "New recruit James Carter matches founder-member David Murray's energy and agility, and the hell-for-leather free-for-alls are balanced by languorous harmonies."

The Guardian's John Fordham remarked: "Post-Coltrane free jazz, elegant Ellingtonian four-part harmonies and the powerful personalities of the four members... make it a highly varied set... Yes We Can represents the WSQ in exuberantly incandescent mood."

Will Layman, in an article for PopMatters, wrote: "Yes We Can is proof that the band remains utterly solid, even with two players who are essentially new to things. It's an endorsement not merely of the group, but also of the idea of the group that this concert seems like the quartet at its very best. Here is the World Saxophone Quartet again, embracing old verities but sounding fresh because in fact there is new blood in the veins."

In a review for Stereophile, Fred Kaplan stated: "Yes We Can is the most jolting, swinging, all-round best album by the World Saxophone Quartet in nearly 20 years."

== Track listing ==
1. "Hattie Wall" (Bluiett) – 10:54
2. "The River Niger" (Jordan) – 9:06
3. "Yes We Can" (Murray) – 9:36
4. "The God of Pain" (Murray) – 6:19
5. "The Angel of Pain" (Murray) – 7:48
6. "The Guessing Game" (Bluiett) – 11:10
7. "Long March to Freedom" (Murray) – 9:00
8. "Hattie Wall (Reprise)" (Bluiett) – 4:32

== Personnel ==
- Hamiet Bluiett – baritone saxophone
- James Carter – soprano saxophone, tenor saxophone
- Kidd Jordan – alto saxophone
- David Murray – tenor saxophone, bass clarinet
