= One Atmosphere =

Studio album by Julius Hemphill
- Released: August 2003
- Studio: Peter Karl Studios
- Genre: Experimental
- Length: 51:02
- Label: Tzadik
- Producer: Marty Ehrlich

One Atmosphere is an album composed entirely by Texas-born saxophonist Julius Hemphill. Tzadik Records released the album in August 2003. It is considered experimental and avant-garde.

== Reception ==
Professional ratings
Review scores
Source	Rating
All About Jazz	4.5/5 stars
AllMusic	4.5/5 stars

In a review for AllMusic, Thom Jurek called the opening track "one of [Hemphill's] most compelling pieces," while "Savannah Suite" "concentrates on the interrelationships of the various kinds of lyric tones and rural themes that obsessed Hemphill throughout his life." Jurek went on to describe the four-part "Water Music" as "easily the most monumental and breathtaking piece of music Hemphill ever composed... a labyrinthine work that is the epitome of Hemphill's musicality and deep, almost reverential dedication to the wind family."

Jeff Stockton of All About Jazz noted the music's "combination of blues roots and classical formalism," and wrote: "Tzadik and producer Ehrlich have performed a service documenting and making this music of Julius Hemphill available. All that's missing is the great man himself."

== Track listing ==
1. "One Atmosphere" - 9:01
2. "Savannah Suite" - 8:20
3. "Water Music for Woodwinds: Mr. Neptune" - 9:13
4. "Water Music for Woodwinds: Miss Catherine" - 7:31
5. "Water Music for Woodwinds: King's Pawn" - 7:40
6. "Water Music for Woodwinds: Backwater" - 9:17

== Personnel ==
Although composed by Hemphill, the music was performed by various musicians, as Hemphill died in 1995.

- Pheeroan akLaff - drums, percussion
- Tim Berne - alto and baritone saxophones
- Robert DeBellis - tenor saxophone, flute, clarinet
- Marty Ehrlich - soprano and alto saxophones, flute
- Erik Friedlander - cello
- Sam Furnace - soprano and alto saxophones, flute
- Oliver Lake - soprano and alto saxophones, flute
- Ursula Oppens - piano
- J. D. Parran - baritone saxophone, flute, clarinet
- Aaron Stewart - tenor saxophone, flute
- Pacific String Quartet
