= Metamorphosis (World Saxophone Quartet album) =

Studio album by World Saxophone Quartet
- Released: 1990
- Recorded: 1990
- Genre: Jazz
- Length: 61:32
- Label: Elektra/Nonesuch

World Saxophone Quartet chronology
Rhythm and Blues (1990)	Metamorphosis (1990)	Moving Right Along (1992)

Metamorphosis is an album by the jazz group the World Saxophone Quartet, released in 1990 on the Elektra/Nonesuch label and features performances by Hamiet Bluiett, Arthur Blythe, Oliver Lake and David Murray with Chief Bey, Melvin Gibbs and Mor Thiam. It was the first album recorded by the group after the departure of foundation member Julius Hemphill and their first to feature additional musicians.

== Reception ==
Professional ratings
Review scores
Source	Rating
AllMusic	2.5/5 stars
The Penguin Guide to Jazz Recordings	3/4 stars

The AllMusic review by Brian Olewnick stated, "By their own high standards, Metamorphosis had to be reckoned a disappointment."

The authors of The Penguin Guide to Jazz Recordings wrote that Blythe "fills the outgoing man's shoes with impressive confidence, checking in with a powerful contrapuntal weave that is lifted a notch by the presence of the three African drummers."

Writing for The Washington Post, Geoffrey Himes noted that "the results are uneven," but stated that the album is most convincing "when the emphasis shifts to American jazz, and the Senegalese add their rhythmic flavors to the background."

== Track listing ==
1. "The Holy Men" (Bluiett) - 2:48
2. "Lullaby" (Thiam) - 4:51
3. "Metamorphosis" (Blythe) - 3:28
4. "Su Mama Ah Zumu" (Murray, Thiam) - 6:25
5. "Africa" (Lake) - 8:54
6. "Ballad for the Blackman" (Murray) - 7:52
7. "Masai Warrior's Dance" (Bluiett) - 5:14
8. "Love Like Sisters" (Lake) - 4:07
9. "Lo Chi Lo" (Murray) -6:57
10. "Feed the People" (Bluiett) - 10:56

== Personnel ==
- Hamiet Bluiett — baritone saxophone
- Arthur Blythe — alto saxophone
- Oliver Lake — alto saxophone, soprano saxophone, flute
- David Murray — tenor saxophone, bass clarinet
- Chief Bey — asiko, signal drum, shakere
- Mor Thiam — gmba, gabala, gum gum, rain stick, bgnn
- Mar Gueye — limbe, m'beum m'beum, gring m'biss m'biss
- Melvin Gibbs — electric bass (on 1,2,5)
