= Oliver Lake =

American jazz musician, composer, poet, and artist (born 1942)

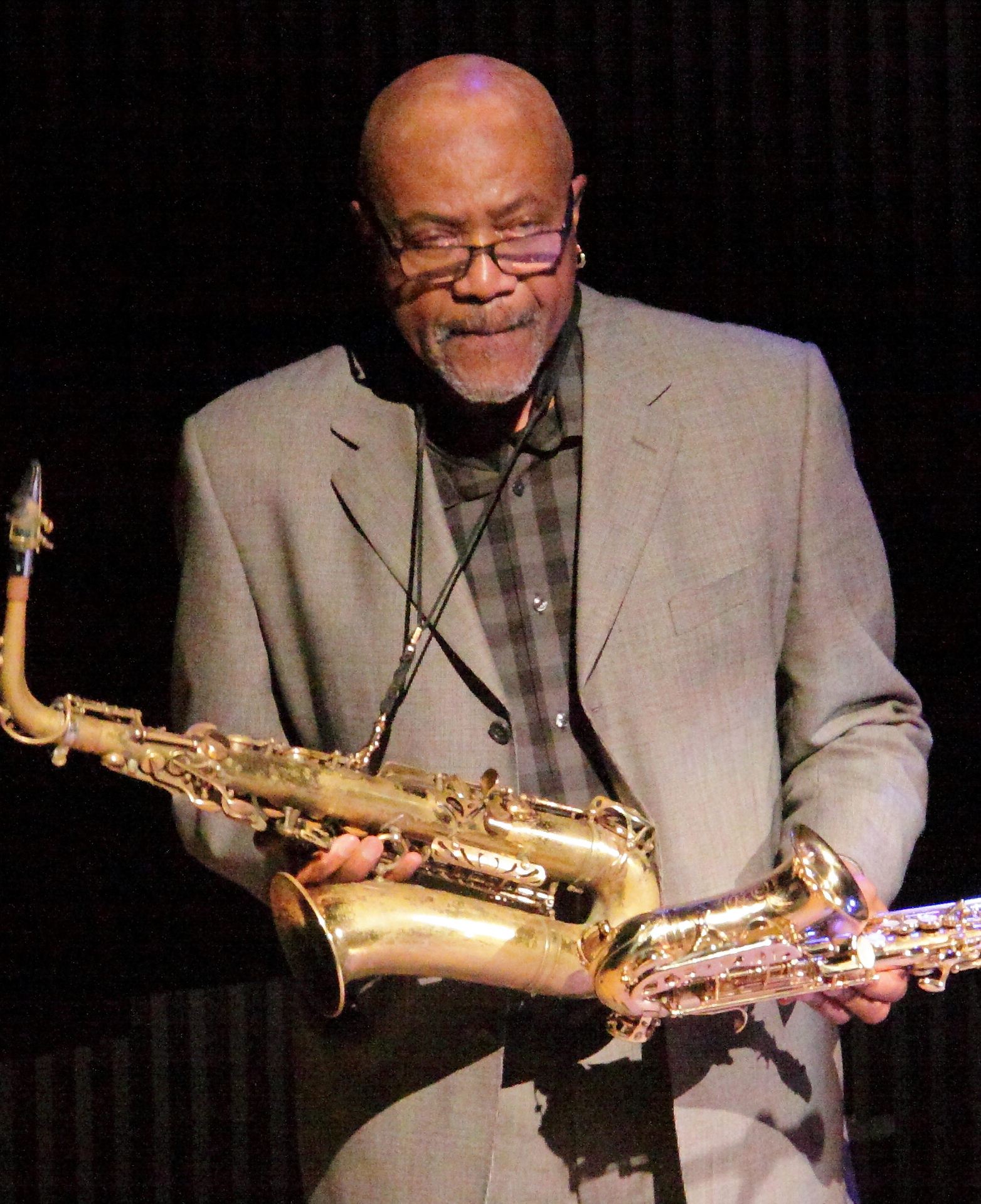
- Lake taking a bow at Other Minds, San Francisco, 2016

Background information
- Born: September 14, 1942 (age 84); Marianna, Arkansas, U.S.
- Genre: Jazz
- Occupation: Musician
- Instrument: Saxophone
- Years active: 1971–present
- Labels: Freedom, Black Saint, Arista Novus, Gramavision, Intakt, Justin Time
- Formerly of: World Saxophone Quartet
- Website: www.oliverlake.net

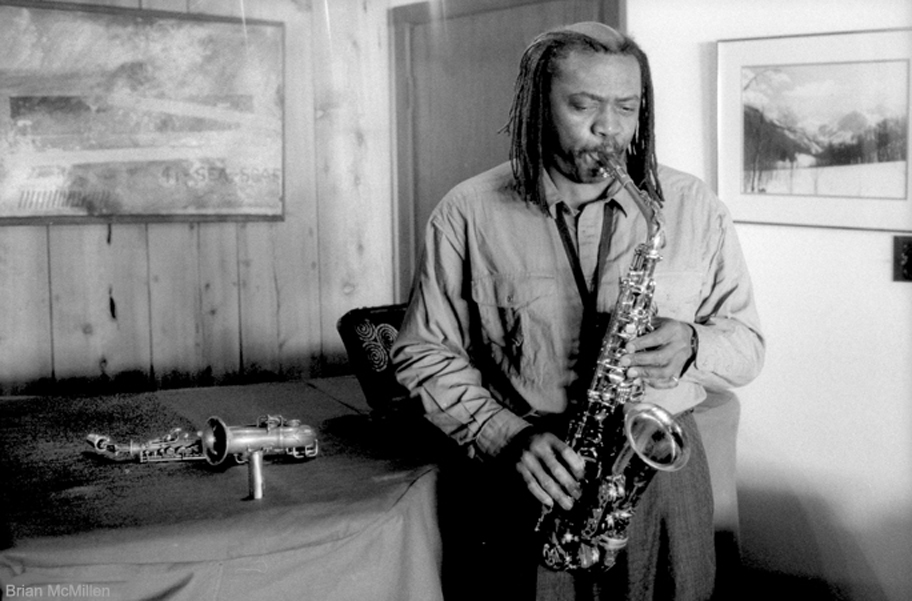
Lake at Bach Dancing & Dynamite Society, Half Moon Bay, CA, 3/6/88

Oliver Lake (born September 14, 1942) is an American jazz saxophonist, flutist, composer, poet, and visual artist. He is known mainly for alto saxophone, but he also performs on soprano and flute. During the 1960s, Lake worked with the Black Artists Group in St. Louis. In 1977, he founded the World Saxophone Quartet with David Murray, Julius Hemphill, and Hamiet Bluiett. Lake worked in the group Trio 3 with Reggie Workman and Andrew Cyrille. Lake has appeared on more than 80 albums as a bandleader, co-leader, and side musician. He is the father of drummer Gene Lake. Lake has been a resident of Montclair, New Jersey.

== Awards and honors ==
- Guggenheim Fellowship (1993)
- Mellon Jazz Living Legacy Award (2006)
- Doris Duke Performing Artist Award (2014)

== Discography ==
=== As leader or co-leader ===
- Passing Thru (Africa, 1974)
- Heavy Spirits (Arista/Freedom, 1975)
- Holding Together (Black Saint, 1976)
- Ntu: Point from Which Creation Begins (Arista/Freedom, 1976, recorded 1971)
- Buster Bee (Sackville, 1978)
- Life Dance of Is (Arista Novus, 1978)
- Shine! (Arista Novus, 1979)
- Clevont Fitzhubert (Black Saint, 1981)
- Prophet (Black Saint, 1981)
- Jump Up (Gramavision, 1982)
- Plug It (Gramavision, 1983)
- Expandable Language (Black Saint, 1985)
- Gallery (Gramavision, 1986)
- Dancevision (Blue Heron, 1986)
- Impala (Gramavision, 1987)
- Otherside (Gramavision, 1988)
- Again and Again (Gramavision, 1991)
- Boston Duets (Music & Arts, 1992)
- Virtual Reality (Total Escapism) (Gazell, 1992)
- Zaki (hat ART, 1992)
- Edge-ing (Black Saint, 1994)
- Dedicated to Dolphy (Black Saint, 1996)
- Matador of 1st & 1st (Passin' Thru, 1996)
- Movement, Turns & Switches (Passin' Thru, 1997)
- Kinda' Up (Justin Time, 2000)
- Talkin' Stick (Passin' Thru, 2000)
- Have Yourself a Merry... (Passin' Thru, 2001)
- Cloth (Passin' Thru, 2003)
- Dat Love (Passin' Thru, 2004)
- Live (Passin' Thru, 2005)
- Urban Rumination (Metaphysical, 2005)
- Lake/Tchicai/Osgood/Westergaard (Passin' Thru, 2006)
- Makin' It (Passin' Thru, 2008)
- For a Little Dancin (Intakt, 2010)
- Plan (Passin' Thru, 2010)
- Lakes at the Stone (Passin' Thru, 2011)
- Wheels (Passin' Thru, 2013)
- All Decks (Intakt, 2013)
- What I Heard (Passin' Thru, 2014)
- To Roy (Intakt, 2015)
- Live at the Downtown Music Gallery NYC (2016)
- Right Up On (Passin' Thru, 2017)
- Spirit (SFÄR, 2023)

With Trio 3

- Live in Willisau (Dizim, 1997)
- Encounter (Passin' Thru, 2000)
- Open Ideas (Palmetto, 2002)
- Time Being (Intakt, 2006)
- Wha's Nine: Live at the Sunset (Marge, 2008)
- Berne Concert (Intakt, 2009)
- At This Time (Intakt, 2009)
- Celebrating Mary Lou Williams–Live at Birdland New York (Intakt, 2011)
- Refraction – Breakin' Glass (Intakt, 2013)
- Wiring (Intakt, 2014)
- Visiting Texture (Intakt, 2017)

With the OGJB Quartet (Lake, Graham Haynes, Joe Fonda, Barry Altschul)

- Bamako (TUM, 2019)
- Ode to O (TUM, 2022)

=== As sideman ===
With Karl Berger

- Live at the Donaueschingen Music Festival (MPS, 1980)
- New Moon (Palcoscenico, 1980)

With Björk

- Debut (One Little Indian, 1993)
- Celebrating Wood and Metal (MTV, 1997)
- Surrounded (One Little Indian, 2006)

With Andrew Cyrille

- My Friend Louis (DIW, 1992)
- Ode to the Living Tree (Venus, 1995)

With Ted Daniel

- In the Beginning (Altura Music, 1997)
- Innerconnection (NoBusiness, 2014)

With Michael Gregory Jackson

- Clarity (Bija, 1977)
- Karmonic Suite (Improvising Artists 1978)

With Meshell Ndegeocello

- The World Has Made Me the Man of My Dreams (Bismillah, 2007)
- The Spirit Music Jamia: Dance of the Infidel (Universal/EmArcy, 2005)

With Malachi Thompson

- Freebop Now! (Delmark, 1998)
- Talking Horns (Delmark, 2001)

With James Blood Ulmer

- Are You Glad to Be in America? (Rough Trade, 1980)
- Free Lancing (Columbia, 1981)

With World Saxophone Quartet

- Point of No Return (Moers Music, 1977)
- Steppin' with the World Saxophone Quartet (Black Saint, 1979)
- W.S.Q. (Black Saint, 1981)
- Revue (Black Saint, 1982)
- Live in Zurich (Black Saint, 1984)
- Live at Brooklyn Academy of Music (Black Saint, 1986)
- Plays Duke Ellington (Elektra Nonesuch, 1986)
- Dances and Ballads (Elektra Nonesuch, 1987)
- Rhythm and Blues (Elektra Musician, 1989)
- Metamorphosis (Elektra Nonesuch, 1991)
- Moving Right Along (Black Saint, 1994)
- Breath of Life (Elektra Nonesuch, 1994)
- Takin' It 2 the Next Level (Justin Time, 1996)
- Four Now (Justin Time, 1996)
- Selim Sivad: a Tribute to Miles Davis (Justin Time, 1998)
- M'Bizo (Justin Time, 1999)
- Requiem for Julius (Justin Time, 2000)
- 25th Anniversary: The New Chapter (Justin Time, 2001)
- Steppenwolf (Justin Time, 2002)
- Experience (Justin Time, 2004)
- Political Blues (Justin Time, 2006)

With others

- Pheeroan Aklaff, Global Mantras (ModernMasters, 1998)
- Dee Alexander, Songs My Mother Loves (Blujazz, 2014)
- Borah Bergman, A New Organization (Soul Note, 1999)
- Black Artists Group, In Paris, Aries 1973 (self-issued in 1973; reissued by Aguirre in 2018)
- Samuel Blaser, Early in the Morning (Outnote, 2018)
- Joseph Bowie, Joseph Bowie & Oliver Lake (Sackville, 1976)
- Anthony Braxton, New York, Fall 1974 (Arista, 1975)
- Baikida Carroll, Orange Fish Tears (Palm, 1974)
- Alex Cline, For People in Sorrow (Cryptogramophone, 2013)
- Jerome Cooper, For the People (hat Hut, 1980)
- Marilyn Crispell, Circles (Victo, 1991)
- Defunkt, Live in Europe (Music Avenue, 2002)
- Dave Douglas, Metamorphosis (Greenleaf Music, 2017)
- Lisle Ellis, Sucker Punch Requiem: Henceforth (2008)
- Laika Fatien, Nebula (Verve, 2011)
- Donal Fox, Gone City (New World, 1997)
- Dennis Gonzalez, Idle Wild (Clean Feed, 2005)
- Ross Hammond, Our Place On the Wheel (Prescott, 2020)
- Craig Harris, Souls Within the Veil (Aquastra Music, 2005)
- Billy Hart, Enchance (Horizon, 1977)
- Julius Hemphill, One Atmosphere (Tzadik, 2003)
- Human Arts Ensemble, Whisper of Dharma (Universal Justice, 1972)
- Bill Laswell, Bill Laswell & Material (Golden Stars, 2005)
- Abbey Lincoln, Who Used to Dance (Verve/Gitanes, 1997)
- Mark Masters, Farewell Walter Dewey Redman (Capri, 2008)
- Material, One Down (Elektra/Celluloid, 1982)
- Mediaeval Baebes, Undrentide (BMG, 2000)
- Tatsuya Nakamura, Song of Pat (Nadja, 1976)
- Lou Reed, Set the Twilight Reeling (Warner Bros., 1995)
- Archie Shepp, Phat Jam in Milano (Dawn of Freedom 2009)
- Solidarity Unit, Inc., Red, Black & Green (Universal Justice Records, 1972; Eremite, 2008)
- Bernadette Speach, Without Borders (Mode, 1988)
- String Trio of New York, Frozen Ropes (Barking Hoop, 2005)
- Sunny Murray, Apple Cores (Philly Jazz, 1978)
- Trio Transition, Trio Transition with Special Guest Oliver Lake (DIW, 1988)
- Bennie Wallace, The Art of the Saxophone (Denon, 1987)
- Reggie Workman, Synthesis (Leo, 1986)
