= Steppin' with the World Saxophone Quartet =

Studio album by World Saxophone Quartet
- Released: 1979
- Recorded: December 1978
- Genre: Jazz
- Length: 44:40
- Label: Black Saint
- Producer: Giacomo Pellicciotti

World Saxophone Quartet chronology
Point of No Return (1977)	Steppin' with the World Saxophone Quartet (1979)	W.S.Q. (1980)

Steppin' with the World Saxophone Quartet is an album by the jazz group the World Saxophone Quartet, released on the Italian Black Saint label in 1979. The album features performances by Hamiet Bluiett, Julius Hemphill, Oliver Lake and David Murray.

== Reception ==
Professional ratings
Review scores
Source	Rating
AllMusic	4.5/5 stars
DownBeat	3.5/5 stars
Tom Hull	B
The Penguin Guide to Jazz Recordings	3/4 stars
The Rolling Stone Jazz Record Guide	4/5 stars

The AllMusic review by Scott Yanow stated: "The second recording by The World Saxophone Quartet (which follows by a year their Moers Music release Point of No Return) gives one a well-rounded look at this powerful group. Composed of altoist Julius Hemphill (who contributes four of the six group originals), altoist Oliver Lake, tenorman David Murray and baritonist Hamiet Bluiett, the explorative yet rhythmic group is heard in their early prime on this stimulating release".

In an article for The New York Times, Robert Palmer wrote: "Each of the pieces on Steppin' is a vivid and complete statement with a sound and direction of its own... Throughout, the quartet demonstrates that the musicians know exactly what they are doing."

== Track listing ==
1. "Steppin'" (Hemphill) - 9:06
2. "Ra-Ta-Ta" (Lake) - 5:26
3. "Dream Scheme" (Hemphill) - 7:18
4. "P.O. in Cairo" (Murray) - 10:47
5. "Hearts" (Hemphill) - 3:01
6. "R&B" (Hemphill) - 8:39

== Personnel ==
- Hamiet Bluiett — baritone saxophone
- Julius Hemphill — alto saxophone
- Oliver Lake — alto saxophone
- David Murray — tenor saxophone
