= Live in Zurich (World Saxophone Quartet album) =

Live album by World Saxophone Quartet
- Released: 1984
- Recorded: November 6, 1981
- Genre: Jazz
- Length: 40:13
- Label: Black Saint

World Saxophone Quartet chronology
Revue (1982)	Live in Zurich (1984)	Live at Brooklyn Academy of Music (1986)

Live in Zurich is an album by the jazz group the World Saxophone Quartet, recorded in 1981 and released on the Italian Black Saint label.

The album features live performances by alto saxophonists Julius Hemphill and Oliver Lake, tenor saxophonist David Murray and baritone saxophonist Julius Hemphill, recorded in Zurich on November 6, 1981. The album features Julius Hemphill's compositions exclusively, with the exception of the opening and closing versions of Hamiett Bluiett's 'WSQ theme', "Hattie Wall".

== Reception ==
Professional ratings
Review scores
Source	Rating
AllMusic	4.5/5 stars
Tom Hull	B+
The Penguin Guide to Jazz Recordings	3/4 stars
The Rolling Stone Jazz Record Guide	4/5 stars

The AllMusic review by Scott Yanow stated, "By 1981, after four years of existence, it was obvious that the most talented writer in the World Saxophone Quartet was altoist Julius Hemphill. This Black Saint release finds Hemphill contributing six of the eight pieces, including the hard-swinging 'Bordertown', the colorful 'Steppin' and a vivid feature for David Murray's tenor on 'My First Winter'. A particularly strong release by a classic and innovative group."

The Washington Post's Mike Joyce noted that "the sweeping elegance and sumptuous colors reminiscent of Duke Ellington's work are occasionally reflected in Hemphill's compositions," and stated that the album "offers further evidence of just how important and influential this group has become. The recording displays the band's exceptional rhythmic autonomy, the feverish mind of composer Julius Hemphill and the robust yet precise ensemble work of all the players."

== Track listing ==
1. "Hattie Wall" (Bluiett) – 1:40
2. "Funny Paper" (Hemphill) – 4:45
3. "Touchic" (Hemphill) – 5:21
4. "My First Winter" (Hemphill) – 6:54
5. "Bordertown" (Hemphill) – 7:30
6. "Steppin'" (Hemphill) – 7:15
7. "Stick" (Hemphill) – 5:18
8. "Hattie Wall" (Bluiett) – 1:30

== Personnel ==
- Hamiet Bluiett — baritone saxophone
- Julius Hemphill — alto saxophone
- Oliver Lake — alto saxophone
- David Murray — tenor saxophone
