= Prophet (Oliver Lake album) =

Studio album by Oliver Lake
- Released: 1980
- Recorded: August 11 & 12, 1980
- Genre: Jazz
- Length: 39:25
- Label: Black Saint
- Producer: Oliver Lake

Oliver Lake chronology
Life Dance of Is (1978)	Prophet (1980)	Jump Up (1981)

Prophet is an album by American jazz saxophonist Oliver Lake, recorded in 1980 for the Italian Black Saint label. The album is a tribute to Eric Dolphy.

== Reception ==
The AllMusic review by Al Campbell called the album "a relatively straight-ahead date".

Professional ratings
Review scores
Source	Rating
AllMusic	4/5 stars
The Penguin Guide to Jazz Recordings	3/4 stars
The Rolling Stone Jazz Record Guide	4/5 stars

== Track listing ==
All compositions by Oliver Lake except as indicated

1. "Hat and Beard" (Eric Dolphy) - 7:00
2. "Something Sweet, Something Tender" (Dolphy) - 4:30
3. "Poster" - 6:25
4. "The Prophet" (Dolphy) - 7:05
5. "Cotton IV" - 7:40
6. "Firm and Ripe" - 6:45

- Recorded at Sound Heights Studios in Brooklyn, New York, on August 11 & 12, 1980

== Personnel ==
- Oliver Lake - alto saxophone
- Baikida Carroll - trumpet, flugelhorn
- Donald Smith - piano
- Jerome Harris - bass
- Pheeroan akLaff - drums
