= Rhythm and Blues (World Saxophone Quartet album) =

Studio album by World Saxophone Quartet
- Released: 1989
- Recorded: November 1988
- Genre: Jazz
- Length: 39:55
- Label: Elektra/Musician
- Producer: Marty Khan

World Saxophone Quartet chronology
Dances and Ballads (1987)	Rhythm and Blues (1989)	Metamorphosis (1990)

Rhythm and Blues is an album by the jazz group the World Saxophone Quartet, released on the Elektra label. The album features performances by Hamiet Bluiett, Julius Hemphill, Oliver Lake and David Murray and was first released in 1989.

== Reception ==
Professional ratings
Review scores
Source	Rating
AllMusic	4.5/5 stars
The Penguin Guide to Jazz Recordings	3.5/4 stars

The AllMusic review by Scott Yanow stated, "The combination works quite well on this surprising success."

The authors of The Penguin Guide to Jazz Recordings wrote: "The soul staples covered on Rhythm and Blues... are done with absolute conviction and seriousness."

Geoffrey Himes, writing for The Washington Post, praised the group's "sumptuous sound," and commented: "David Murray and Julius Hemphill conjure up the rich voices of Redding and Gaye on their horns (and Hamiet Bluiett's deep baritone sax resembles the bass voice of the Coasters' Bobby Nunn). The arrangements refract the vocal melody into three simultaneous alternatives that proceed while Bluiett honks his strong bass lines."

In an article for the Chicago Tribune, Chris Heim wrote: "Rhythm and Blues focuses on a well-known sound. The group faces special challenges here, since the original versions of these nine tracks... relied heavily not only on a rhythm section, but also on a powerful singing voice. But WSQ suggests all that and more. Call it whatever you like, but what this group really makes is magic."

== Track listing ==
1. "For the Love of Money" (Gamble, Huff) - 4:13
2. "Let's Get It On" (Gaye, Townsend) - 5:33
3. "I Heard That" (Bluiett) - 4:48
4. "Loopology" (Hemphill) - 3:09
5. "(Sittin' On) The Dock of the Bay" (Cropper, Redding) - 4:30
6. "Messin' with the Kid" (London) - 4:05
7. "Try a Little Tenderness" (Campbell, Connelly, Woods) - 6:30
8. "Nemesis" (Bluiett) - 3:01
9. "Night Train" (Forrest, Simpkins, Washington) - 4:06

== Personnel ==
- Hamiet Bluiett — baritone saxophone
- Julius Hemphill — alto saxophone
- Oliver Lake — alto saxophone
- David Murray — tenor saxophone
