= Point of No Return (World Saxophone Quartet album) =

Live album by World Saxophone Quartet
- Released: 1977
- Recorded: June 1977
- Genre: Jazz
- Length: 44:40
- Label: Moers Music
- Producer: Burkhard Hennen

World Saxophone Quartet chronology
Point of No Return (1977)	Steppin' with the World Saxophone Quartet (1979)

Point of No Return is the debut album by the jazz group the World Saxophone Quartet, released on the Moers Music label in 1977.

The album features a live performance by alto saxophonists Julius Hemphill and Oliver Lake, tenor saxophonist David Murray and baritone saxophonist Hamiett Bluiett. It was recorded at the 6th International New Jazz Festival in Moers in June 1977.

== Reception ==
Professional ratings
Review scores
Source	Rating
AllMusic	4/5 stars
The Penguin Guide to Jazz	3.5/4 stars
The Rolling Stone Jazz Record Guide	3/5 stars

The AllMusic review by Scott Yanow stated: "In future years, World Saxophone Quartet would better temper their free solos with inventive writing, but this early set is pretty self-indulgent."

Writer Gary Giddins commented: "little on... Point of No Return suggested serious absorption in exploring the potential of a renegade sax section (Murray's hurly-burly 'Scared Sheetless' pointedly fills most of the play time), and that little bit was by Hemphill, who always preferred group conception to workaday nightly improvisation."

Todd S. Jenkins called the album "one of their most daunting documents," and described "Sacred Sheetless" as "a series of increasingly abrasive solos." He noted: "perhaps realizing that this approach was a little too overboard for their target audience, the men chose to temper their energy just a bit in future projects."

== Track listing ==
1. "Dar el Sudan" (Hemphill) - 2:48
2. "Bajou Scetches" (Bluiett) - 10:13
3. "Point of No Return" (Hemphill) - 10:32
4. "Sacred Sheetless" (Murray) - 24:26
5. "Hymn for the Old Year" (Lake) - 3:38

== Personnel ==
- Hamiet Bluiett — baritone saxophone
- Julius Hemphill — alto saxophone
- Oliver Lake — alto saxophone
- David Murray — tenor saxophone
