= World Saxophone Quartet: Plays Duke Ellington =

Plays Duke Ellington

Studio album by World Saxophone Quartet
- Released: 1986
- Recorded: April 1986
- Genre: Jazz
- Length: 69:16
- Label: Elektra/Nonesuch
- Producer: Robert Hurwitz

World Saxophone Quartet chronology
Live at Brooklyn Academy of Music (1986)	Plays Duke Ellington (1986)	Dances and Ballads (1987)

Plays Duke Ellington is an album by the jazz group the World Saxophone Quartet, released in 1986.

The album marked a departure for the quartet, as their first six albums had been of music written by the four musicians themselves; this was their first venture into jazz standards.

== Reception ==
Professional ratings
Review scores
Source	Rating
AllMusic	5/5 stars
Robert Christgau	A−
The Penguin Guide to Jazz Recordings	3.5/4 stars

AllMusic's Scott Yanow wrote: "Although the tunes... are familiar, the interpretations are certainly unusual, showing respect for the original melodies and then coming up with new directions. This is thought-provoking music that serves as the perfect introduction to the unique World Saxophone Quartet."

Robert Christgau stated: "I admire the way the quartet format suggests sonorous magnificence without deploying an embarrassment of riches in its service. Barely touched by deconstructive anarchy, these homages constitute the richest, mellowest music ever recorded by a group whose accomplishment has always been tarnished by a certain theoretical veneer."

The authors of The Penguin Guide to Jazz Recordings wrote that the album "marks a gentle, middle-market turn that did the group no harm at all... The sound is better than usual, with no congestion round about the middle, as on some of the earlier sets."

Writing for The Washington Post, Mike Joyce commented: "Not only is this the band's most accessible album... but it's also the group's crowning glory -- a deeply felt and strikingly original homage to Ellington's genius... It's also hard to imagine Ellington... not being pleased with these results."

== Track listing ==
1. "Take the 'A' Train" (Strayhorn) – 1:33
2. "Lush Life" (Strayhorn) – 6:30
3. "Prelude to a Kiss" (Ellington–Gordon–Mills) – 2:43
4. "Sophisticated Lady" (Ellington–Mills–Parish) – 4:41
5. "I Let a Song Go Out of My Heart" (Ellington–Mills–Nemo) – 6:02
6. "Come Sunday" (Ellington) – 7:36
7. "In a Sentimental Mood" (Ellington–Kurtz–Mills) – 5:16
8. "Take the 'A' Train" (Strayhorn) – 4:55

== Personnel ==
- Hamiet Bluiett – baritone saxophone
- Julius Hemphill – alto saxophone
- Oliver Lake – alto saxophone
- David Murray – tenor saxophone
