= W.S.Q. (album) =

Studio album by World Saxophone Quartet
- Released: 1980
- Recorded: March 1980
- Genre: Jazz
- Length: 39:35
- Label: Black Saint

World Saxophone Quartet chronology
Steppin' with the World Saxophone Quartet (1979)	W.S.Q. (1980)	Revue (1982)

W.S.Q. is a 1980 album by the jazz group the World Saxophone Quartet released on the Italian Black Saint label. The album features performances and compositions by Hamiet Bluiett, Julius Hemphill, Oliver Lake and David Murray.

== Reception ==
Professional ratings
Review scores
Source	Rating
AllMusic	4/5 stars
The Encyclopedia of Popular Music	3/5 stars
Tom Hull	B+
The Penguin Guide to Jazz	4/4 stars
The Rolling Stone Jazz Record Guide	5/5 stars

The album was identified by Chris Kelsey in his AllMusic essay "Free Jazz: A Subjective History" as one of the 20 Essential Free Jazz Albums.

The AllMusic review by Scott Yanow stated, "There is plenty of variety to the third album by the unique World Saxophone Quartet. The music ranges from nearly free improvisations to the four-part "Suite Music," which was almost completely written out. Rather than being a screamfest for the four innovative saxophonists..., this is a well constructed and sometimes surprisingly accessible (although always explorative) program."

The authors of The Penguin Guide to Jazz Recordings awarded the album 4 stars, calling it "the best of the earlier records," and noting that it is "dominated by a long suite that blends jazz and popular elements with considerable ingenuity and real improvisational fire." They stated that "Fast Life" is "as fine a curtain-piece as the group has recorded."

== Track listing ==
1. "Sundance" (Bluiett) - 2:38
2. "Plainsong" (Hemphill) - 4:19
3. "Connections" (Hemphill) - 8:06
4. "W.S.Q." (Lake) - 5:15
5. "Pillars Latino" (Hemphill) - 5:19
6. "Suite Music: The Key/Ballad for Eddie Jefferson/Pam-Maw/Hattie Wall" (Bluiett) - 5:24
7. "Sound Light" (Lake) - 5:35
8. "Fast Life" (Murray) - 2:59

== Personnel ==
- Hamiet Bluiett — baritone saxophone
- Julius Hemphill — alto saxophone
- Oliver Lake — alto saxophone
- David Murray — tenor saxophone
