= Live at Brooklyn Academy of Music =

Live album by World Saxophone Quartet
- Released: 1986
- Recorded: December 6–7, 1985
- Genre: Jazz
- Length: 47:35
- Label: Black Saint

World Saxophone Quartet chronology
Live in Zurich (1984)	Live at Brooklyn Academy of Music (1986)	World Saxophone Quartet Plays Duke Ellington (1987)

Live at Brooklyn Academy of Music is a live album by the jazz group the World Saxophone Quartet, released on the Italian Black Saint label.

The album features live performances by Hamiet Bluiett, Julius Hemphill, Oliver Lake and David Murray recorded at the Brooklyn Academy of Music in New York City on December 6–7, 1985.

== Reception ==
Professional ratings
Review scores
Source	Rating
AllMusic	4/5 stars
Tom Hull	B

The AllMusic review by Scott Yanow stated, "Of their six originals, it is as usual the three Hemphill contributions that are most memorable."

Martin Johnson of New York included the album in his list "The New York Canon: Jazz", writing, "Soulful pop energy and avant-garde elusiveness prefiguring the late-eighties–early-nineties Knitting Factory scene."

A reviewer for Billboard wrote that the album "finds Messrs. Bluiett, Hemphill, Lake, and Murray waxing bluesy, swinging, and cacophonous."

== Track listing ==
1. "One/Waltz/Time" (Hemphill) - 3:51
2. "Great Peace" (Murray) - 14:58
3. "Kinda' Up" (Lake) - 3:50
4. "Paper Works" (Bluiett) - 8:07
5. "Open Air (For Tommy)" (Hemphill) - 10:14
6. "Georgia Blue" (Hemphill) - 6:35

== Personnel ==
- Hamiet Bluiett — baritone saxophone
- Julius Hemphill — alto saxophone
- Oliver Lake — alto saxophone
- David Murray — tenor saxophone
