= Ebu (album) =

Studio album by Hamiet Bluiett Quartet
- Released: 1984
- Recorded: February 1, 2 and 13, 1984; Classic Sound Studio, New York
- Genre: Jazz
- Length: 44:04
- Label: Soul Note; SN 1088
- Producer: Giovanni Bonandrini

Hamiet Bluiett chronology
Dangerously Suite (1981)	Ebu (1984)	The Clarinet Family (1984)

Ebu is an album by American jazz saxophonist Hamiet Bluiett recorded in 1984 and released on the Italian Soul Note label.

== Reception ==
Professional ratings
Review scores
Source	Rating
AllMusic	3/5 stars
The Penguin Guide to Jazz	3/4 stars

In his review for AllMusic, Chris Kelsey states "Though Ebu has a taste of the arcane, it is mostly a collection of relatively straightahead Bluiett-penned blowing vehicles done with fire and invention. Bluiett has the biggest sound in town; his phrasing and articulation is a little heavy, as one would expect, but he plays with a strength and conviction that's rarely equalled by other baritonists. This music has a manifest unruliness, a spirit of adventure; it leaps outrageously into the unknown and usually lands square on its feet."

== Track listing ==
All compositions by Hamiet Bluiett except as indicated

1. "Ebu" – 8:30
2. "New Bones" – 9:05
3. "Nu Tune" – 3:30
4. "Gumbo (Vegetarian Style)" – 8:02
5. "Things Will Never Be the Same" – 7:40
6. "A Night in Tunisia" (Dizzy Gillespie, Frank Paparelli) – 7:17

== Personnel ==
- Hamiet Bluiett – baritone saxophone, alto clarinet
- John Hicks – piano
- Fred Hopkins – bass
- Marvin "Smitty" Smith – drums
