= Dances and Ballads =

Studio album by World Saxophone Quartet
- Released: 1988
- Recorded: April 1987
- Genre: Jazz
- Length: 47:59
- Label: Elektra/Nonesuch
- Producer: Robert Hurwitz

World Saxophone Quartet chronology
World Saxophone Quartet: Plays Duke Ellington (1986)	Dances and Ballads (1988)	Rhythm and Blues (1990)

Dances and Ballads is an album by the jazz group the World Saxophone Quartet, released in 1988 and featuring performances by Hamiet Bluiett, Julius Hemphill, Oliver Lake and David Murray.

== Reception ==
Professional ratings
Review scores
Source	Rating
AllMusic	4/5 stars
The Penguin Guide to Jazz Recordings	4/4 stars

The AllMusic review by Scott Yanow stated, "This is an underrated release, recorded between their better-known Plays Duke Ellington and Rhythm and Blues CDs."

The authors of The Penguin Guide to Jazz Recordings commented: "There's a broader big-band sound to Dances and Ballads, achieved without the addition of outsiders... there's a fine version of David Murray's Pres tribute, 'For Lester'... and Oliver Lake's 'West African Snap', 'Belly Up', and 'Adjacent' are among the best of his recorded compositions."

== Track listing ==
1. "Sweet D" (Hemphill) - 6:35
2. "For Lester" (Murray) - 4:20
3. "Belly Up" (Lake) - 6:44
4. "Cool Red" (Hemphill) - 5:12
5. "Hattie Wall" (Bluiett) - 4:04
6. "Adjacent" (Lake) - 4:49
7. "West African Snap" (Lake) - 3:41
8. "Full, Deep and Mellow" (Bluiett) - 3:16
9. "Dance Until Dawn (For Little Anthony)" (Murray) - 7:08
10. "Fast Life" (Murray) - 3:01

== Personnel ==
- Hamiet Bluiett — baritone saxophone
- Julius Hemphill — alto saxophone
- Oliver Lake — alto saxophone
- David Murray — tenor saxophone
