= Hamiet Bluiett =

American jazz musician and composer (1940–2018)

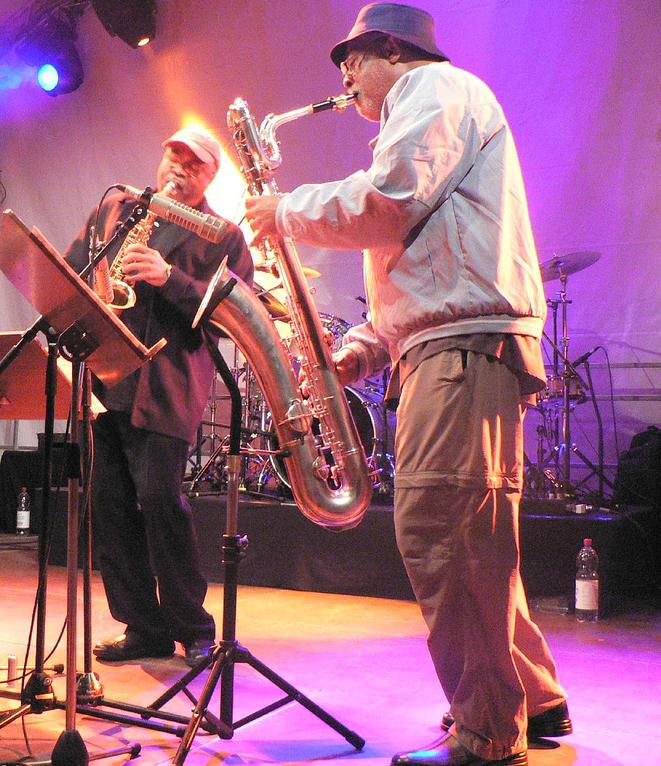
- Oliver Lake (left) and Hamiet Bluiett performing in 2007

Background information
- Born: September 16, 1940; Brooklyn, Illinois, U.S.
- Died: October 4, 2018 (aged 78) St. Louis, Missouri, U.S.
- Genre: Jazz
- Occupation: Musician
- Instrument: Saxophone
- Years active: 1961–2018
- Labels: India Navigation, Musica, Black Saint, Mapleshade, Knitting Factory, Moers, Justin Time
- Formerly of: World Saxophone Quartet, D.D. Jackson, Kahil El'Zabar
- Website: www.allaboutjazz.com/musicians/hamiet-bluiett

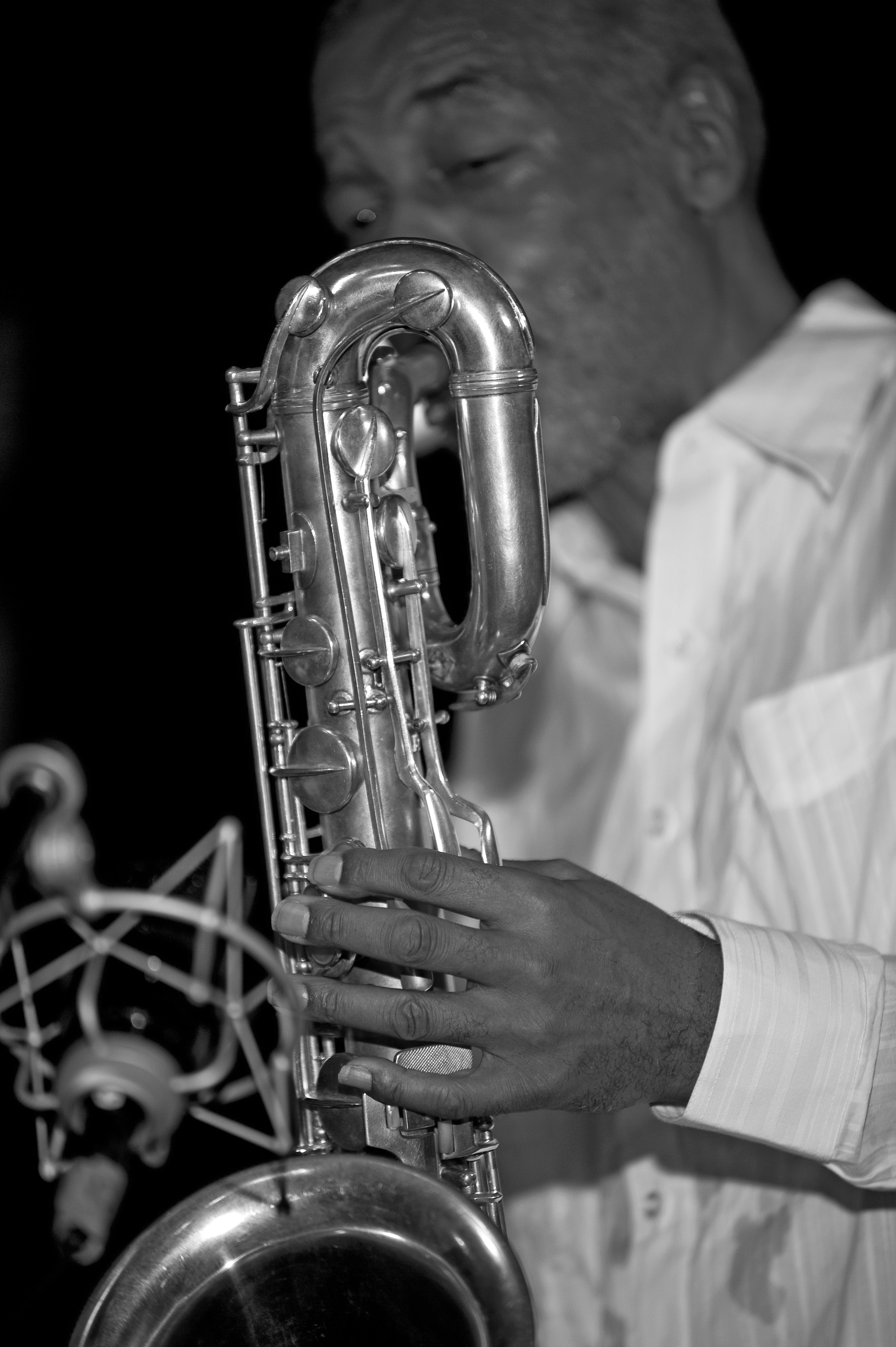
Hamiet Bluiett, Vision XIII Festival

Hamiet Bluiett (BLUE-et; September 16, 1940 – October 4, 2018) was an American jazz saxophonist, clarinetist, and composer. His primary instrument was the baritone saxophone, and he was considered one of the finest players of this instrument. A member of the World Saxophone Quartet, he also played (and recorded with) the bass saxophone, E-flat alto clarinet, E-flat contra-alto clarinet, and wooden flute.

== Biography ==
Bluiett was born just north of East St. Louis in Brooklyn, Illinois (also known as Lovejoy), a predominantly African-American village that had been founded as a free black refuge community in the 1830s, and which later became America's first majority-black town. As a child, he studied piano, trumpet, and clarinet, but was attracted most strongly to the baritone saxophone from the age of ten. He began his musical career by playing the clarinet for barrelhouse dances in Brooklyn, Illinois, before joining the Navy band in 1961. He attended Southern Illinois University Carbondale.

In his mid-twenties, Bluiett heard Harry Carney (the baritone player in the Duke Ellington band) play in a live concert in Boston, which also made a strong impression on the young Bluiett, providing an example of a baritone saxophonist who played as soloist rather than accompanist.

Following his time in the Navy, he returned to the St. Louis area in the mid-1960s. In the late 1960s Bluiett co-founded the Black Artists' Group (BAG) of St. Louis, Missouri, a collective dedicated to fostering creative work in theater, visual arts, dance, poetry, film, and music. He led the BAG big band during 1968 and 1969.

In late 1969, Bluiett moved to New York City, where he joined the Charles Mingus Quintet and the Sam Rivers large ensemble. In late 1972, Bluiett joined Charles Mingus and toured Europe with him. In January 1974, Bluiett returned to Mingus and played in a quintet alongside George Adams, appearing on Mingus at Carnegie Hall. He continued to play with Mingus until autumn 1974, when he left to make his own recordings as a leader.

In 1976 he co-founded the World Saxophone Quartet, along with two other Black Artists' Group members, Julius Hemphill and Oliver Lake, as well as multi-reedist David Murray.

He remained a champion of the somewhat unwieldy baritone saxophone, organizing large groups of baritone saxophones. In the 1980s, he also founded the Clarinet Family, a group of eight clarinetists playing clarinets of various sizes ranging from E-flat soprano to contrabass. Since the 1990s Bluiett led a quartet, the Bluiett Baritone Nation, made up entirely of baritone saxophones, with drum set accompaniment.

Bluiett also worked with Babatunde Olatunji, Abdullah Ibrahim, Stevie Wonder, and Marvin Gaye.

He returned to his hometown of Brooklyn, Illinois, in 2002 but moved back to New York City in 2012. In his final years, he performed at gigs, including the New Haven Jazz Festival on August 22, 2009. He performed with students from Neighborhood Music School in New Haven, Connecticut. The group were known as Hamiet Bluiett and the Improvisational Youth Orchestra. He died in St. Louis, Missouri on October 4, 2018, after a period of declining health.

== Discography ==
=== As leader ===
- 1976: Endangered Species (India Navigation)
- 1977: Bars (Musica)
- 1977: Resolution (Black Saint)
- 1978: Birthright (India Navigation)
- 1979: Im/Possible to Keep (India Navigation)
- 1981: Dangerously Suite (Soul Note)
- 1984: Ebu (Soul Note)
- 1987: The Clarinet Family (Black Saint)
- 1991: If You Have To Ask You Don't Need To Know (Tutu)
- 1993: Nali Kola (Soul Note)
- 1993: Sankofa / Rear Garde (Soul Note)
- 1994: Bearer of the Holy Flame (Black Fire)
- 1995: Young Warrior, Old Warrior (Mapleshade)
- 1996: Bluiett's Barbecue Band (Mapleshade)
- 1997: Live at the Village Vanguard - Ballads & Blues (Soul Note)
- 1997: Makin' Whoopee: Tribute to the King Cole Trio (Mapleshade)
- 1997: Hamiet Bluiett & Concept: Live at Carlos 1 (Justin Time, 1997)
- 1997: Hamiet Bluiett & Concept: Live at Carlos 1: Another Night (Justin Time, 1997)
- 1998: Hamiet Bluiett & Concept: Live at Carlos 1: Last Night (Justin Time, 1998)
- 1998: Bluiett Baritone Saxophone Group Live at the Knitting Factory (Knitting Factory)
- 1998: Bluiett Baritone Nation: Libation for the Baritone Saxophone Nation (Justin Time)
- 1999: Join Us (Justin Time) (with D. D. Jackson and Mor Thiam)
- 2000: With Eyes Wide Open (Justin Time)
- 2001: The Calling with D. D. Jackson and Kahil El'Zabar
- 2002: Blueblack

With the World Saxophone Quartet

Title	Year	Label
Point of No Return	1977	Moers
Steppin' with the World Saxophone Quartet	1979	Black Saint
W.S.Q.	1981	Black Saint
Revue	1982	Black Saint
Live in Zurich	1984	Black Saint
Live at Brooklyn Academy of Music	1986	Black Saint
Plays Duke Ellington	1986	Elektra / Nonesuch
Dances and Ballads	1987	Elektra / Nonesuch
Rhythm and Blues	1989	Elektra / Nonesuch
Metamorphosis	1991	Elektra / Nonesuch
Moving Right Along	1993	Black Saint
Breath of Life	1994	Elektra / Nonesuch
Four Now	1996	Justin Time
Takin' It 2 the Next Level	1996	Justin Time
Selim Sivad: a Tribute to Miles Davis	1998	Justin Time
Requiem for Julius	2000	Justin Time
25th Anniversary: The New Chapter	2001	Justin Time
Steppenwolf	2002	Justin Time
Experience	2004	Justin Time
Political Blues	2006	Justin Time
Yes We Can	2010	Jazzwerkstatt

=== As sideman ===
With The 360 Degree Music Experience

- In: Sanity (Black Saint, 1976)

With Lester Bowie

- The Great Pretender (ECM, 1981)

With Anthony Braxton

- New York, Fall 1974 (Arista, 1974)

With James Carter

- Conversin' with the Elders (Atlantic, 1996)
- Out of Nowhere (Half Note, 2005)

With Andrew Cyrille

- Route de Frères (Tum, 2011)

With Gil Evans

- Live at the Public Theater (New York 1980) (Trio, 1981)
- Bud and Bird (Electric Bird/King, 1986 [1987])
- Farewell (Evidence, 1986 [1992])

With Craig Harris

- F-Stops (Soul Note, 1993)

With Abdullah Ibrahim

- The Journey (Chiaroscuro, 1977)

With Charles Mingus

- Mingus at Carnegie Hall (Atlantic, 1974)

With David Murray

- Now Is Another Time (Justin Time, 2003)

With the Music Revelation Ensemble

- In the Name of... (DIW, 1994)
- Knights of Power (DIW, 1996)

With Sam Rivers' Rivbea All-star Orchestra

- Inspiration (BMG France, 1999)
- Culmination (BMG France, 1999)

With Malachi Thompson

- Talking Horns (Delmark, 2001) with Oliver Lake

With Randy Weston and Melba Liston

- Volcano Blues (Verve, 1993)
