= Dangerously Suite =

Studio album by Hamiet Bluiett
- Released: 1981
- Recorded: April 9, 1981; Right Track Recording Studio, New York, NY
- Genre: Jazz
- Length: 44:24
- Label: Soul Note; SN 1018
- Producer: Giovanni Bonandrini

Hamiet Bluiett chronology
Im/Possible to Keep (1979)	Dangerously Suite (1981)	Ebu (1984)

Dangerously Suite is an album by American jazz saxophonist Hamiet Bluiett recorded in 1980 and released on the Italian Soul Note label.

== Reception ==
Professional ratings
Review scores
Source	Rating
AllMusic	2.5/5 stars

In his review for AllMusic, Milo Fine states the session "tried a bit too hard to cover all the "Black music" bases from ballads to swing to blues to gospel to funk. The group played well, but only a few surface levels of feeling/commitment seemed to be explored."

== Track listing ==
All compositions by Hamiet Bluiett except as indicated

1. "Between the Raindrops" – 8:17
2. "Ballad of Eddie Jefferson" – 6:35
3. "Full, Deep and Mellow" – 6:48
4. "Prayer" (Chief Bey) – 1:20
5. "Blues for Atlanta Georgia" – 5:08
6. "Mighty Denn" – 4:22
7. "Doll Baby" – 4:17
8. "Oasis" – 5:39
9. "Rain Shout" (Chief Bey, Hamiet Bluiett) – 1:58

== Personnel ==
- Hamiet Bluiett – baritone saxophone, alto clarinet
- Bob Neloms – piano
- Buster Williams – bass
- Jabali Billy Hart – drums
- Chief Bey – African percussion
- Irene Datcher – vocals
