= Gene Lake =

American jazz drummer (born 1966)

Oliver Gene Lake, Jr. (born January 12, 1966, in St. Louis) is an American jazz drummer. He is the son of saxophonist Oliver Lake.

Lake began playing drums when he was five years old, and took lessons with Pheeroan akLaff as a high schooler at The High School of Music & Art in New York City. He attended Berklee College of Music, where he worked with Tommy Campbell, and played in local Boston bands in a variety of styles. He played with his father in New York in 1987 and 1988, then joined Henry Threadgill's ensemble in 1990.

Later in the 1990s he worked with Steve Coleman, Lunar Crush (with David Fiuczynski and John Medeski), Marcus Miller, Brandon Ross, David Sanborn, the World Saxophone Quartet, and Joe Zawinul. Outside of jazz, Lake also played with R&B musicians such as Maxwell and Me'Shell Ndegeocello.

Lake has recorded several albums as a leader, including "The Oliver Lake Quartet" (1990), "Dedication" (1998), and "At This Time" (2009).

Lake has been a resident of Montclair, New Jersey.

== Discography ==
As bandleader leader:

- Cycles (2000)
- Here and Now (2011)
- The Kingdom Within (2018)
- Head to the Sky (2021)

As a sideman:

- Steve Coleman and Five Elements - The Thao of Mad Phat (1993)
- David Fiuczynski and John Medeski - Lunar Crush (1994)
- D'Angelo - Brown Sugar (1995)
- Me'shell Nedegeocello - Peace Beyond Passion (1996)
- Maxwell - Embrya (1998)
- Me'shell Nedegeocello - Cookie (2002)
- The RH Factor - Hard Groove (2003)
- Axelle Red - French Soul (2004)
- Me'shell Nedegeocello - The Spirit Music Jamia: Dance of the Infidel (2005)
- Leo Courbot - Passion at a Distance (2024)
