= World Saxophone Quartet =

American jazz ensemble

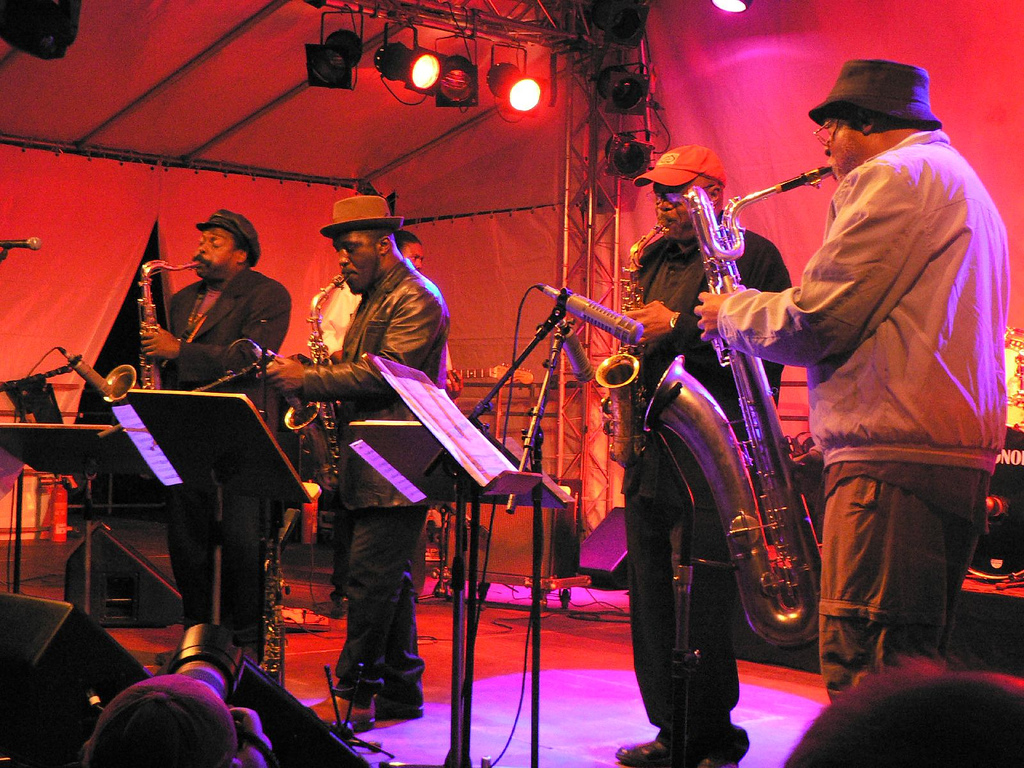
- In 2007, from left to right: David Murray, Tony Kofi, Oliver Lake and Hamiet Bluiett. Photo by Andy Newcombe

Background information
- Years active: 1977–2016
- Past members: David Murray; Hamiet Bluiett (deceased); James Carter; Kidd Jordan (deceased); Julius Hemphill (deceased); Oliver Lake; Arthur Blythe (deceased); Eric Person; John Purcell; Bruce Williams; Jaleel Shaw

The World Saxophone Quartet was an American jazz ensemble founded in 1977, incorporating elements of free jazz, R&B, funk and South African jazz into their music.

The original members were Julius Hemphill (alto and soprano saxophone, flute), Oliver Lake (alto and soprano saxophone), Hamiet Bluiett (baritone saxophone, alto clarinet), and David Murray (tenor saxophone, bass clarinet). The first three had worked together as members of the Black Artists' Group in St. Louis, Missouri, and had appeared together on Anthony Braxton's album New York, Fall 1974. In 1991, Hemphill left the group due to illness, and was replaced by Arthur Blythe, although several saxophonists have filled his chair in the years since. Hemphill died on April 2, 1995. Beginning in the early 1980s, the quartet used Bluiett's composition "Hattie Wall" (released on W.S.Q., Live in Zurich, Dances and Ballads, Steppenwolf and Yes We Can) as a signature theme for the group. The group principally recorded and performed as a saxophone quartet, usually with a line-up of two altos, tenor, and baritone (reflecting the composition of a classical string quartet), but were also joined later in their career by drummers, bassists, and other musicians. Occasionally other saxophonists would sit in or substitute for a tour. These guests have included Sam Rivers, Tony Kofi, Steve Potts, Branford Marsalis, James Spaulding and Jorge Sylvester. Hamiet Bluiett died on October 4, 2018, after an extended illness. The ensemble had split up in 2016.

== Discography ==
=== Predecessor Tack ===
- Composition No. 37 from "New York, Fall 1974" (Arista, AL 4032) [Anthony Braxton, Oliver Lake, Julius Hemphill, Hamiet Bluiett]

=== Albums ===
Title	Year	Label
Point of No Return	1977	Moers Music
Steppin' with the World Saxophone Quartet	1979	Black Saint
W.S.Q.	1981	Black Saint
Revue	1982	Black Saint
Live in Zurich	1984	Black Saint
Live at Brooklyn Academy of Music	1986	Black Saint
Plays Duke Ellington	1986	Elektra / Nonesuch
Dances and Ballads	1987	Elektra / Nonesuch
Rhythm and Blues	1989	Elektra / Nonesuch
Metamorphosis	1991	Elektra / Nonesuch
Moving Right Along	1993	Black Saint
Breath of Life	1994	Elektra / Nonesuch
Four Now	1996	Justin Time
Takin' It 2 the Next Level	1996	Justin Time
Selim Sivad: A Tribute to Miles Davis	1998	Justin Time
M'Bizo	1999	Justin Time
Requiem for Julius	2000	Justin Time
25th Anniversary: The New Chapter	2001	Justin Time
Steppenwolf	2002	Justin Time
Experience	2004	Justin Time
Political Blues	2006	Justin Time
Yes We Can	2010	Jazzwerkstatt
