= Okyerema Asante =

Ghanaian musician

Okyerema Asante is a master drummer. Born in Ghana, he is famous for performing all parts of a traditional five-person drum group by himself. He attaches percussion instruments to various parts of his body and simultaneously plays drums, a balafon, and many other instruments. He uses as many as 85 instruments in one performance. Coming from a family of drummers, Asante is an expert of traditional Ghanaian talking drums. Asante is also known for playing with Paul Simon on his Graceland album.

== Albums ==
- Ohene Kesee A Ebin
- Crabs in a Bucket
- Bringing The Flame Home: From Havana to Africa (with Benito Gonzalez).
