= Julius Hemphill =

American jazz composer and saxophonist (1938–1995)

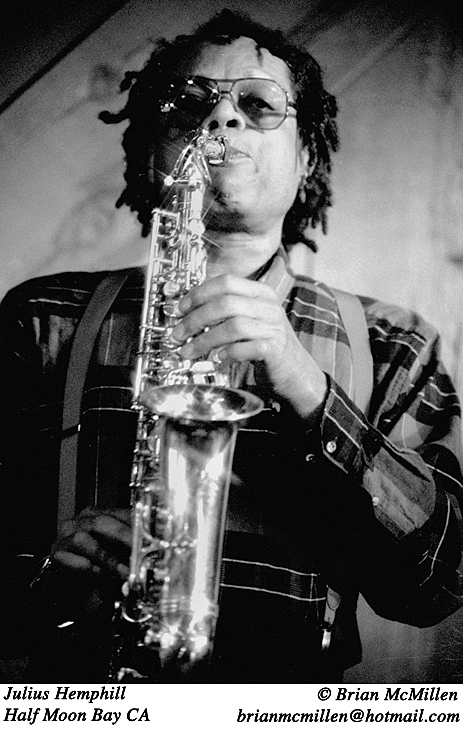
- Julius Hemphill, Bach Dancing & Dynamite Society, Half Moon Bay, California; March 6, 1988

Background information
- Born: Julius Arthur Hemphill; January 24, 1938; Fort Worth, Texas, U.S.
- Died: April 2, 1995 (aged 57) New York City
- Genres: Jazz, avant-garde jazz, free jazz
- Occupation: Musician
- Instrument: Saxophone
- Years active: 1965–1995
- Labels: Black Lion, Screwgun, Sackville, Arista, Black Saint, Music & Arts
- Formerly of: World Saxophone Quartet

Julius Arthur Hemphill (January 24, 1938 – April 2, 1995) was a jazz composer and saxophone player. He performed mainly on alto saxophone, less often on soprano and tenor saxophones and flute.

== Biography ==
Hemphill was born in Fort Worth, Texas, and attended I.M. Terrell High School (as did Ornette Coleman). He studied the clarinet with John Carter, another I.M. Terrell alumnus, before learning saxophone. Gerry Mulligan was an early influence. He studied music at North Texas State College.

Hemphill joined the United States Army in 1964, and served for several years in the United States Army Band. He later performed with Ike Turner for a brief period. In 1968, Hemphill moved to St. Louis, Missouri, and co-founded the Black Artists' Group (BAG), a multidisciplinary arts collective that brought him into contact with artists such as saxophonists Oliver Lake and Hamiet Bluiett, trumpeters Baikida Carroll and Floyd LeFlore, and writer/director Malinke Robert Elliott.

Hemphill moved to New York City in the mid-1970s, and was active in the then-thriving free jazz community. He gave saxophone lessons to a number of musicians, including David Sanborn and Tim Berne. Hemphill was probably best known as the founder of the World Saxophone Quartet, a group he formed in 1976, after collaborating with Anthony Braxton in several saxophone-only ensembles. Hemphill left the World Saxophone Quartet in the early 1990s, and formed a saxophone quintet.

Hemphill recorded over 20 albums as a leader, around 10 records with the World Saxophone Quartet and recorded or performed with Björk, Bill Frisell, Anthony Braxton and others. Late in his life, ill-health (including diabetes and heart surgery) forced Hemphill to stop playing saxophone, but he continued writing music until his death in New York City. His saxophone sextet, led by Marty Ehrlich, also released several albums of Hemphill's music, but without Hemphill playing. The most recent is entitled The Hard Blues, recorded live in Lisbon after Hemphill's death from diabetes.

In 2021, New World Records released a retrospective seven-disc box set album titled The Boyé Multi-National Crusade for Harmony featuring Hemphill in a variety of mostly live solo and group contexts.

A source of information on Hemphill's life and music is a multi-hour oral history interview that he conducted for the Smithsonian Institution in March and April 1994, and which is held at the Archives Center of the National Museum of American History in Washington, D.C.

== Discography ==
=== As leader ===
- Dogon A.D. (Mbari, 1972)
- Coon Bid'ness (Arista/Freedom, 1975) reissued as Reflections in 1995
- Blue Boyé (Mbari, 1977) (Reissued by Screwgun in 1999)
- Roi Boyé & the Gotham Minstrels (Sackville, 1977)
- Raw Materials and Residuals (Black Saint, 1978)
- Buster Bee (Sackville, 1978) with Oliver Lake
- Live in New York (Red Record, 1978) with Abdul Wadud
- Flat-Out Jump Suite (Black Saint, 1980)
- Georgia Blue (Minor Music, 1984)
- Julius Hemphill Big Band (Elektra Musician, 1988)
- Fat Man and the Hard Blues (Black Saint, 1991)
- Live from the New Music Cafe (Music & Arts, 1992)
- Oakland Duets (Music & Arts, 1992) with Abdul Wadud
- Five Chord Stud (Black Saint, 1993) Hemphill conducts but does not perform
- Chile New York (Black Saint, 1998) (Recorded 1980) with Warren Smith
- Live at Kassiopeia (NoBusiness, 2011) (Recorded 1987) with Peter Kowald
- The Boyé Multi-National Crusade for Harmony (New World, 2021) a seven-CD archival set recorded during 1977–2007
- Circle the Heart (Relative Pitch, 2006) (Recorded 1982) with Marty Ehrlich

Albums featuring Hemphill's music

- Diminutive Mysteries (Mostly Hemphill) (JMT, 1993)
- At Dr. King's Table (New World, 1997)
- One Atmosphere (Tzadik, 2003)
- The Hard Blues: Live in Lisbon (Clean Feed, 2004)
- Hotend: Do Tell Plays the Music of Julius Hemphill (Amirani, 2015)
- The Hemphill Stringtet Plays The Music Of Julius Hemphill (Out Of Your Head, 2025)

With World Saxophone Quartet

- Point of No Return (Moers Music, 1977)
- Steppin' with the World Saxophone Quartet (Black Saint, 1979)
- W.S.Q. (Black Saint, 1981)
- Revue (Black Saint, 1982)
- Live in Zurich (Black Saint, 1984)
- Live at Brooklyn Academy of Music (Black Saint, 1986)
- Plays Duke Ellington (Nonesuch, 1986)
- Dances and Ballads (Elektra Nonesuch, 1987)
- Rhythm and Blues (Elektra Musician, 1989)

=== As sideman ===
- Lightnin' Rod, Hustlers Convention (United Artists, 1973)
- Lester Bowie, Fast Last! (Muse, 1974)
- Anthony Braxton, New York, Fall 1974 (Arista, 1975)
- Charles "Bobo" Shaw, Concere Ntasiah (Universal Justice, 1978)
- Charles "Bobo" Shaw, Streets of St. Louis (Moers Music, 1978)
- Kalaparush, Ram's Run (Cadence, 1982)
- Baikida Carroll, Shadows and Reflections (Soul Note, 1982)
- Jamaaladeen Tacuma, Show Stopper (Gramavision, 1983)
- Jean-Paul Bourelly, Jungle Cowboy (JMT, 1987)
- Bill Frisell, Before We Were Born (Elektra Musician, 1989)
- Allen Lowe, At the Moment of Impact (Fairhaven, 1990)
- Allen Lowe, New Tango 92: After Astor Piazzolla (Fairhaven, 1991)
- Peter Kowald, Duos America (FMP, 1991)
- Peter Kowald, Duos: Europa America Japan (FMP, 1991)
- Juma Sultan's Aboriginal Music Society, Father of Origin (Eremite, 2011)
