= Contra-alto clarinet =

Low pitched instrument

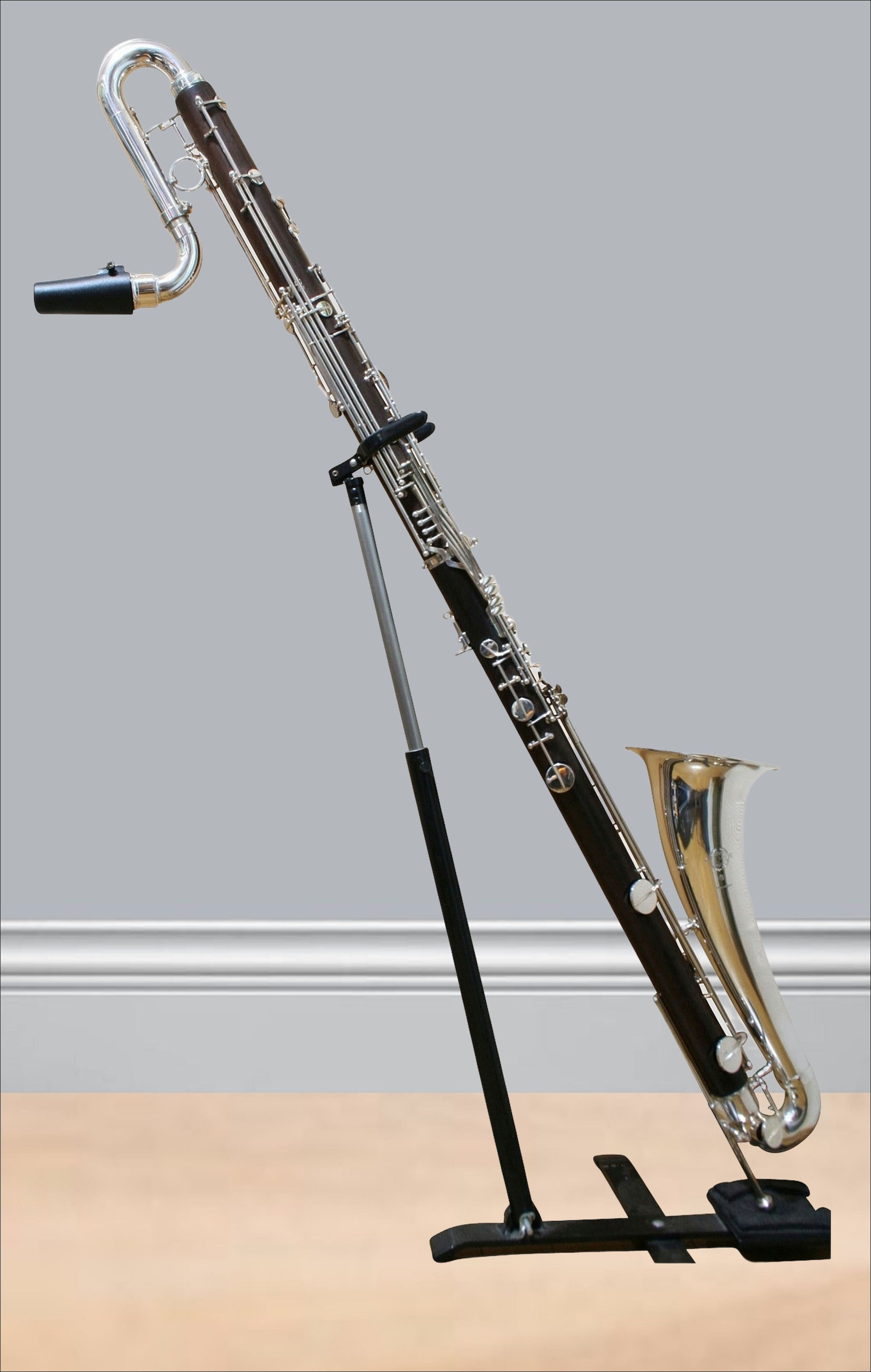
- Selmer Contra-alto clarinet

Woodwind instrument
- Classification: Wind; Woodwind; Single-reed
- Hornbostel–Sachs classification: (Single-reeded aerophone with keys)

Playing range
- written E♭3-F7, sounding F♯1-A♭5

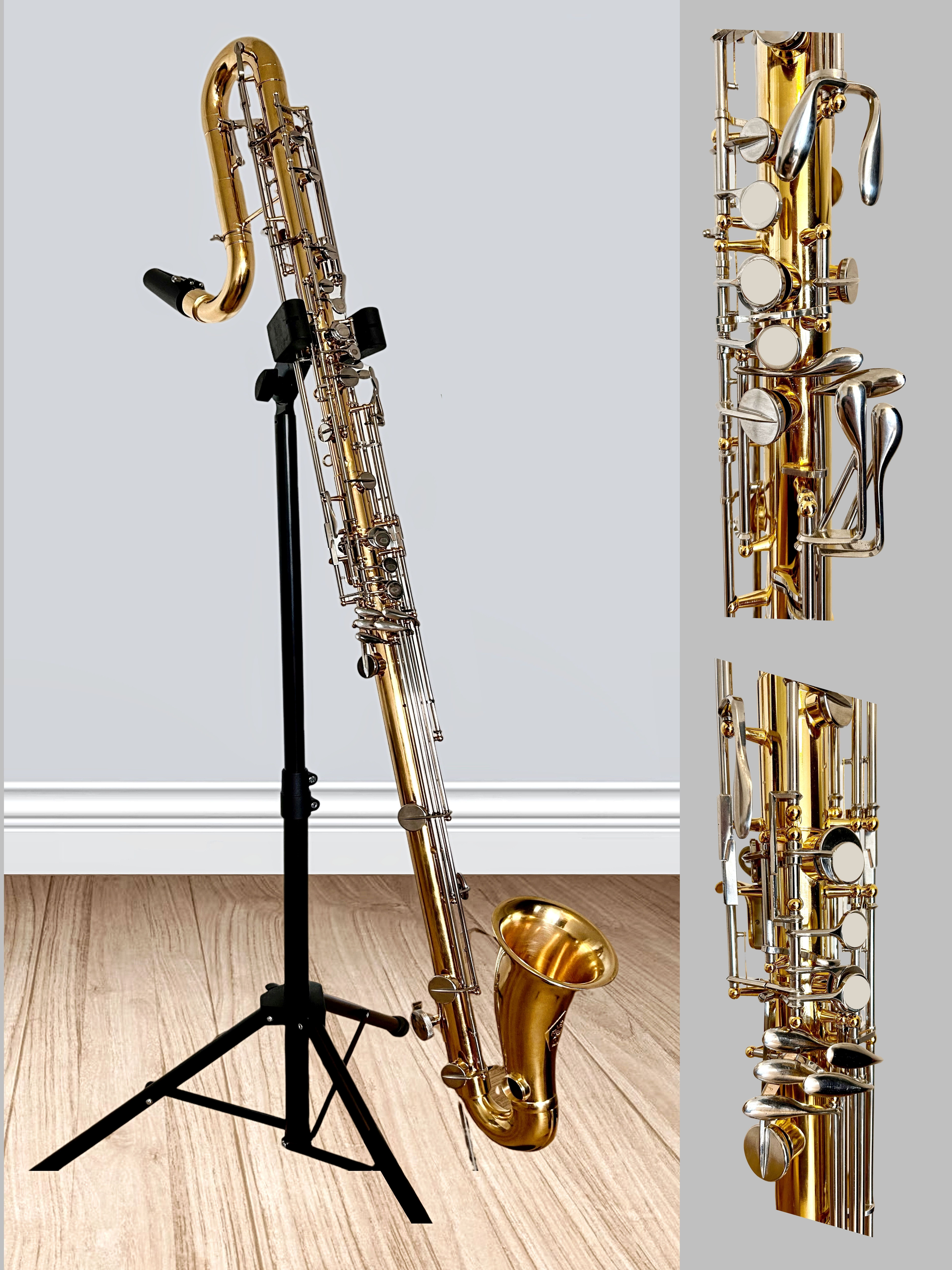
Contra-alto clarinet by Leblanc

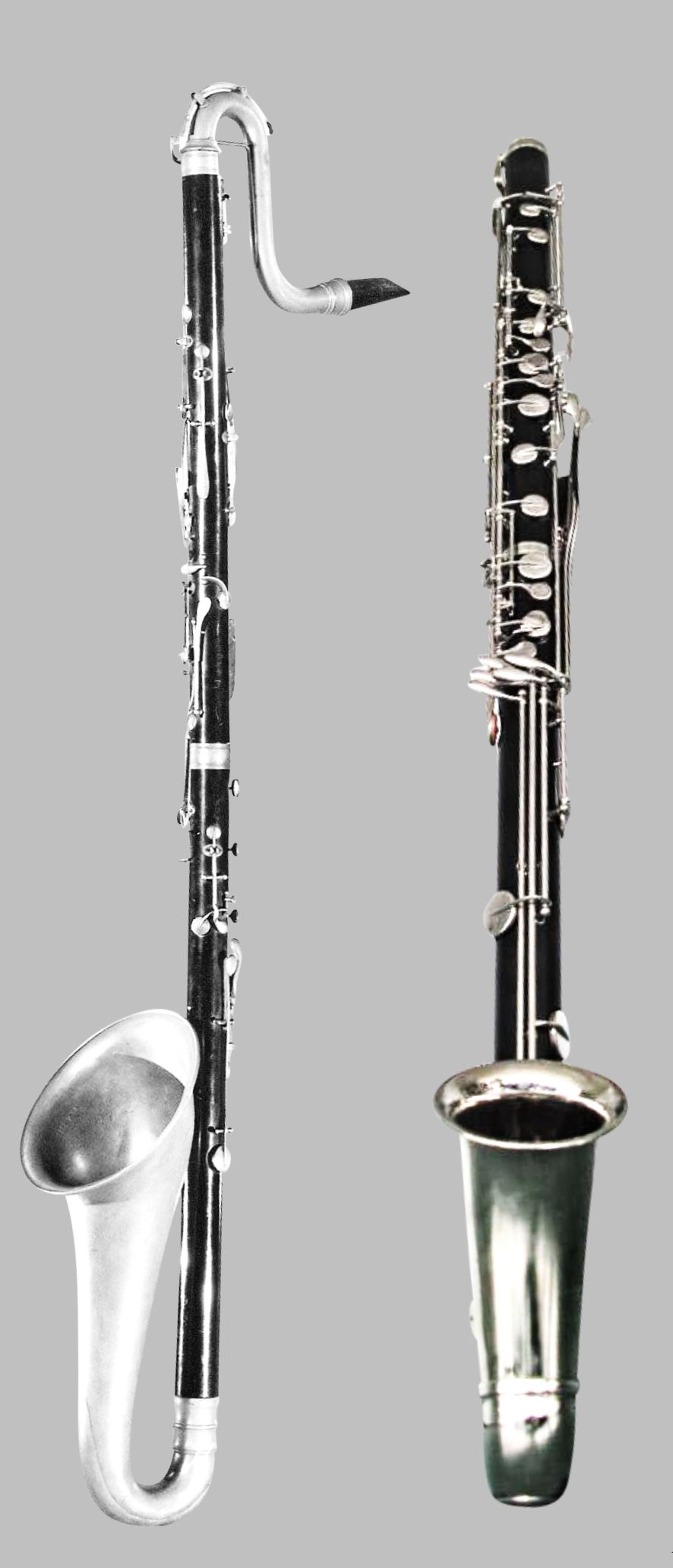
Maldura's contralto clarinet, c. 1880, known as Clarone grande from the side, and a newer instrument from the front.

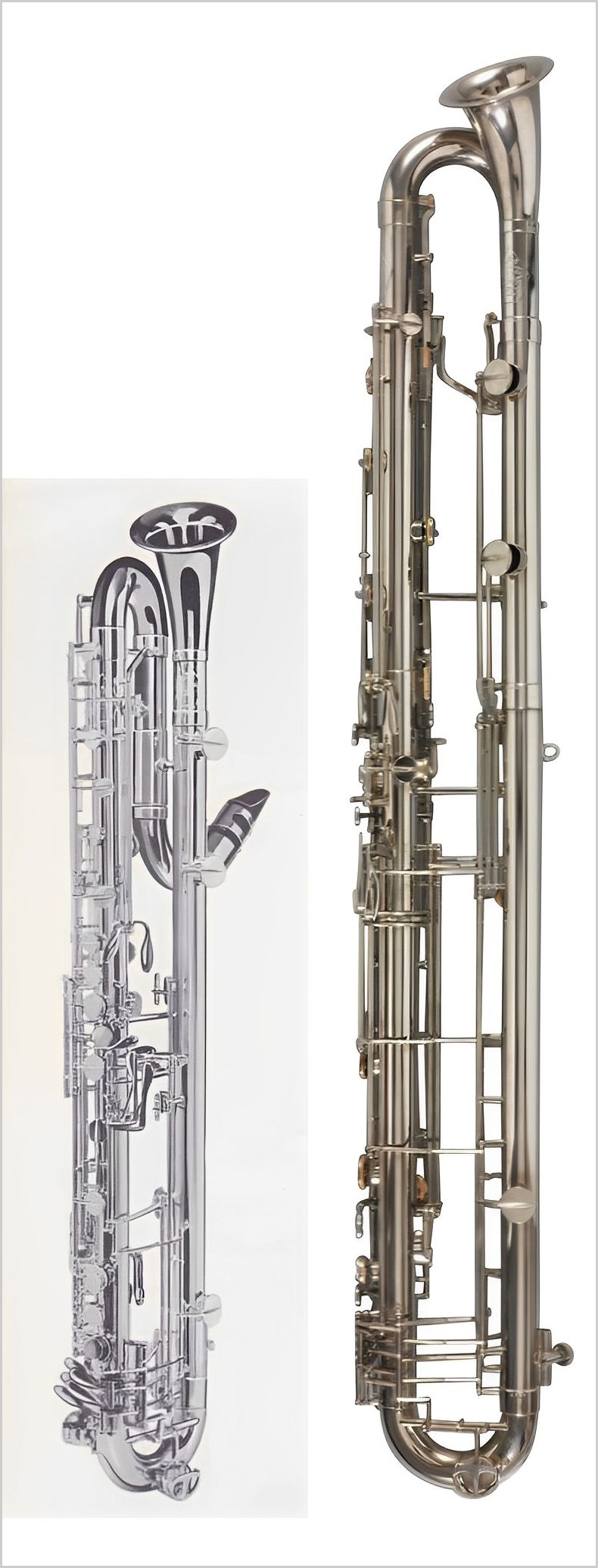
Clarinets "Paperclip" by Georges Leblanc Paris as contra-alto and as contrabass clarinet

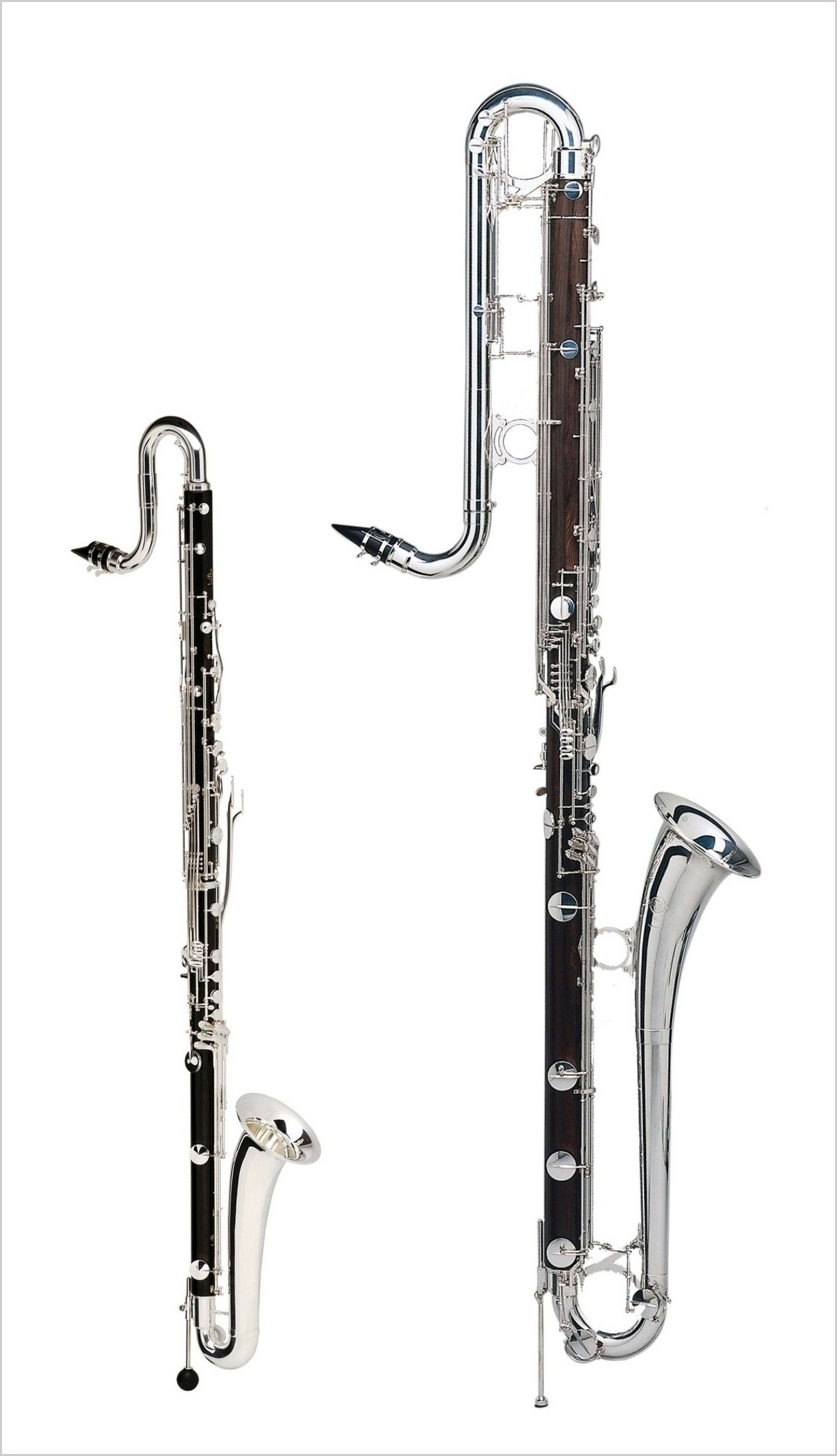
Buffet Crampon contra-alto clarinet compared to a Selmer contrabass clarinet

The contra-alto clarinet, sometimes referred to as the E♭ contrabass clarinet, is a large clarinet pitched a perfect fifth below the B♭ bass clarinet. It is a transposing instrument in E♭ sounding an octave and a major sixth below its written pitch, between the bass clarinet and the B♭ contrabass clarinet.

The contra-alto clarinet is often used in clarinet choirs and ensembles of clarinets and saxophones. It may also be present in a wind band. The repertoire for contra-alto clarinet in the symphony orchestra is limited. In ensembles it is usually used in unison with the other woodwind instruments, such as (bassoon, bass clarinet and contrabass clarinet), or it plays the lower octave in addition.

== History ==
The contra-alto clarinet is largely a development of the 2nd half of the 20th century, although there were some precursors in the 19th century:

- In 1829, Johann Heinrich Gottlieb Streitwolf, an instrument maker in Göttingen, introduced an instrument tuned in F in the shape and fingering of a basset horn, which could be called a contrabasset horn because it played an octave lower than it.
- Around 1890 the Belgian clarinet maker Eugène Albert or his son E. J. Albert also developed an alto clarinet in F, but without the additional basset notes typical of the basset horn notated C to it.
- In 1851, Adolphe Sax applied for a patent for an instrument, he called "contrabass clarinet in E♭" in order to replace the bowed contrabass of symphony orchestras in wind bands with an instrument whose lowest sounding note is contra-G or G1, like the contrabass. This is the case with a contra clarinet tuned in E♭, whose written lowest tone is the small E♭ (E-flat_{3}), as with most clarinets. The pitch of this instrument today identifies it as a contra alto clarinet. However, it never came onto the market.
- Around 1880 the Italian clarinet maker Alessandro Maldura built a contra alto clarinet in E♭ of grenadilla wood with 14 keys, 1.93 m long, which he called Clarone grande, exhibited at the 1881 Italian National Exhibition in Milan.

=== 20th century ===
- Georges Leblanc Paris built two models of a contra-alto clarinet in E-flat, Model 350 and 352, from metal. Model 350 was in a curved shape (known as a paperclip) and went to written low C. These models also have three trill keys on the right side of the upper joint. The curved shape makes the instrument much easier to transport than the traditional straight, non-dismantled model. Model 352 was straight in a bass clarinet-shape to written low E♭.

Other makers of contra-alto clarinets have developed mainly stretched models. These include:

- Henri Selmer Paris
  - Model 26/40 in rosewood to written E, E♭, or D
- Buffet Crampon
  - Metal model patented in 1891 for Evette and Schaeffer (patent FR218373/5)
  - Model Prestige 1553 made of grenadilla, 19 keys.
- Conn-Selmer USA (1980 onwards), Bundy (from 1964 to 1980), Buescher (c. 1968–1969): model 1440 made of ebonite, to written E♭ (written), with 18 keys and 7 plateau keys.
- Leblanc USA / Vito: Model L7181 in Reso-Tone material to E flat (written).
- Ripamonti, Italian manufacturer: model 322 in rosewood, to d (written).
- Martin Frères Company
  - EE-3488 model in ABS
  - EE-3434 model in ebonite
- Harry Pedler, Inc. (Elkhart, IN) was by late 1926 making a contrabass clarinet—presumably an E flat contra-alto.

Today's contra-alto clarinets are mainly based on the Boehm system, Foag Klarinettenbau offers two models with the German system.

== Description and technique ==
The range of most contra-alto clarinets extends downwards to its low E♭ (concert G♭_{1}). Some models go down to D (concert F_{1}) or C (concert E♭_{1}). For this the instrument must be longer and have additional keys which the player operates with the right thumb and/or little fingers (as with the basset horn). In the altissimo range, the fingerings on the contra-alto clarinet are sometimes different from those on the higher clarinets.

Modern contra-alto clarinets have a double (or even triple) automatic stop key.

The contra-alto clarinet has a curved bell, mainly made of metal, which is necessary for sound projection. It is located in the lowest part of the instrument. On the curved clarinets ("paper clip") the bell is in the upper part of the instrument.

The instrument can be played sitting down or standing up with the help of a peg or a strap.

In orchestration, the contra-alto clarinet's playing is as fast as that of the bass clarinet. Unlike other low wind instruments (contrabassoon, tuba, ...) it can play a wide range of nuances from "fff" to "ppp" and articulations ("legato", "staccato", slap, ...). In contemporary music, composers use its ability to produce polyphonic sounds.

== Length ==
The length of the tube (without bell) ranges from about 190 centimeters for a contra-alto clarinet, which lowest written tone is E♭, and up to about 230 centimeters for an instrument down to C.

== Repertoire ==
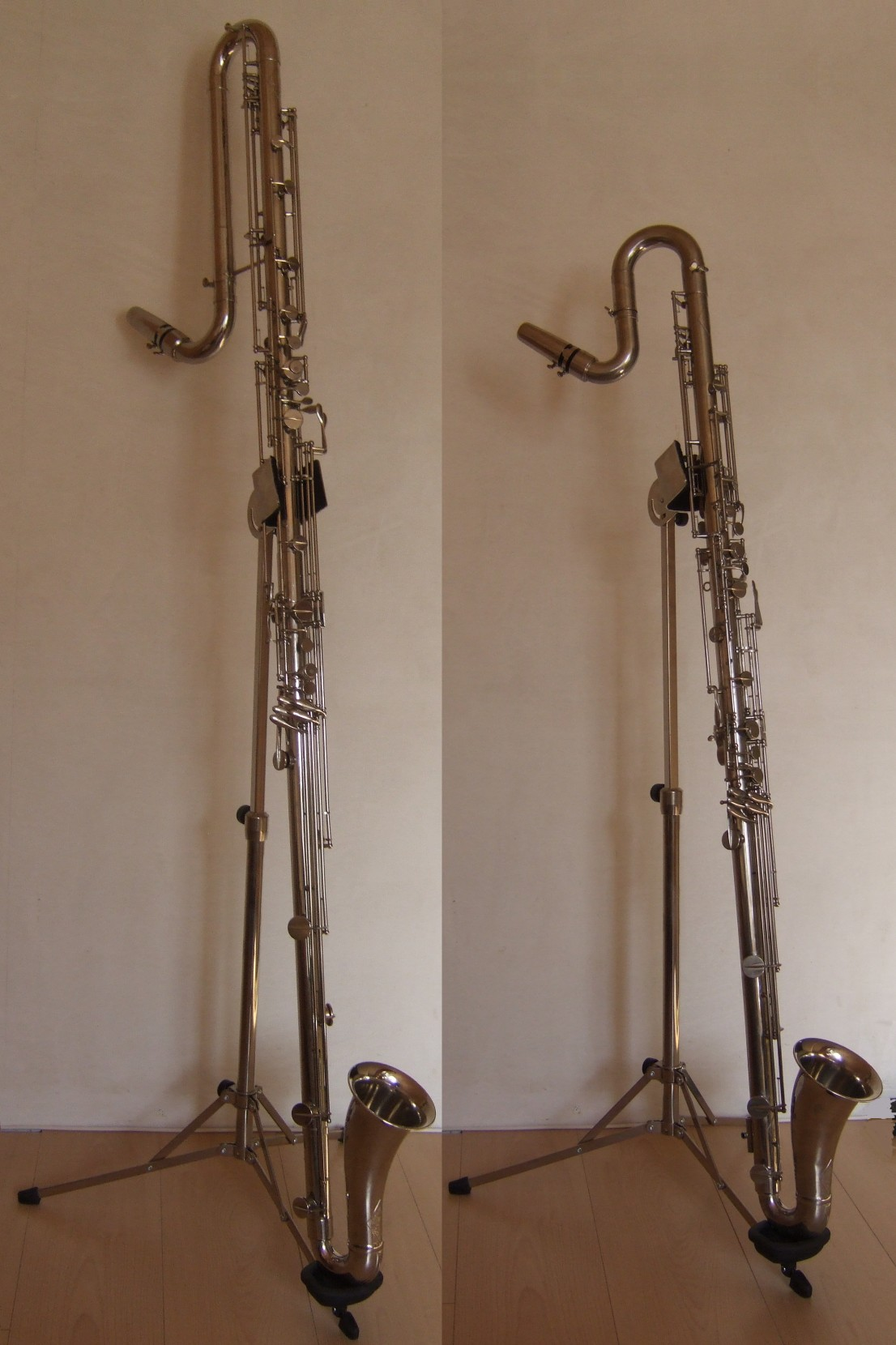
A 352 Leblanc contra-alto clarinet (right) compared to a 342 Leblanc contrabass clarinet.

As the contra-alto clarinet is a relatively young instrument, its repertoire is limited and much smaller than that of the contrabass clarinet. It is represented in all musical styles that emerged after the end of the 19th century, from neoclassicism, New Music, jazz and contemporary music to experimental rock.

In the mid-1960s, pieces in which contra-alto clarinets were also used were said to be heard even from the loudspeakers of small television sets. The instrument was also in Hollywood: early episodes of The Twilight Zone, Star Trek

Given the limited written repertoire in orchestras and ensembles, contra-alto clarinets can play in unison with other low wind instruments or provide a foundation in the lower octave to the woodwinds playing higher (organ pedal effect).

Parts for baritone saxophone in E♭ for wind bands can also be used for contra-alto clarinet. There are also transcriptions and transpositions of pieces written for low instruments in C, such as double bass, bass guitar, bassoon, and tuba.

In the publishing houses, part of the repertoire of the contra-alto clarinet is shared with that of the contrabass clarinet.

=== Neoclassicism ===
- Lien, Fantastic Scherzo with Piano.
- Siennicki, Nocturne with piano.
- Bret Newton, Three Songs for Contra Alto Clarinet and Piano.

=== Contemporary solo and chamber music ===
- Zeno Baldi: copia carbone for ensemble incl. contralto clarinet and electronics
- Chris Dench: Funk for contralto clarinet and percussion
- Davide Ianni: Dedalo Nero for contralto clarinet solo
- Bernhard Lang: Das Hirn for soprano and ensemble incl. ossia part for contralto clarinet

=== Clarinet ensemble ===
- Dick Hyman, Sextet for Clarinets.

=== Wind orchestra ===
- Lucien Cailliet is known for his arrangements for wind orchestra and clarinet ensemble, combining over 6 octaves of different clarinets from the E♭ sopranino to the contra-alto clarinet. The contra-alto clarinet is regularly used in professional wind orchestras.

Americans became aware of the importance of instrumentation during the 20th century to give instruments such as the contra-alto clarinet a place in the brass band (in English military band or concert band).

=== Arrangements ===
There are arrangements for this instrument drawn from the repertoire for other low wind instruments (tuba, bassoon, ...).

- Andrea Catozzi, Beelzebub (Varied programme for tuba solo).

== CD recordings with contra-alto clarinet ==
Recordings in which the contra-alto clarinettist appears as a soloist or chamber musician are extremely rare. A compact disc of duets for contra-alto and contrabass clarinets was recorded in 2018.

- Brandon Evans, Solo Contra Alto Clarinet (Live in Brussels, 1999) (CD, 2001, Parallactic Recordings label).
- Alberto Pinton, Mirror for Contra-Alto Clarinet in the album The Visible, (CD, 2005, Moserobie, MMP, CD022).
- Teppo Salakka, Fragmented Visions (CD, 2018).
- Jason Alder and Piotr Michalowski, Contradictions: Duets for Contrabass and Contra-Alto Clarinets (CD, 2019, Creative Sources Recordings label, CS602).
- Denis Colin, Quiet men (CD, 2019, label Faubourg du Monde).
- Brian Landrus.
- Richard F. Dixon.
- John Linnell, with his band They Might Be Giants, Nanobots (CD, 2013, Lojinx label).
- Damien Sabatier, with his band Impérial Quartet, GRAND CARNAVAL (CD, 2016, Inouïe Distribution label).

== Bibliography ==
- Charles Koechlin (1954), Traité de l'Orchestration (in French), vol. 1: (a) Study of Instruments (b) Balance of Timbres, Paris: Éditions Max Eschig, p. 35, "clarinette-contralto, d'une belle sonorité, à l'8ve grave de la Cl. Alto (The contra-alto clarinet has a beautiful sound)."
- Charles Koechlin (1948), PUF (ed.), "Les instruments à vent", Que sais-je?, vol. 267, Paris, p. 128 OCLC 301429451
