= Justin Time Records =

Canadian record label

- Founded: 1983
- Founder: Jim West
- Distributor: Nettwerk
- Genre: Jazz
- Country of origin: Canada
- Location: Montreal, Quebec
- Official website: justin-time.com

Justin Time Records is a Canadian record company and independent record label founded in Montreal by Jim West. It was established in 1983 and specialises in jazz and blues. Although Justin Time initially recorded Canadian musicians such as Oliver Jones, Ranee Lee, and Diana Krall, it grew to include Americans like David Murray and the World Saxophone Quartet. Paul Bley, Jeri Brown, and D. D. Jackson are also artists in its catalogue.

== Roster ==
- Susie Arioli
- Hugh Ball/Yank Barry
- Jon Ballantyne
- Billy Bang
- Ed Bickert
- Paul Bley
- Hamiet Bluiett
- Bowser and Blue/Yank Barry
- Trudy Desmond
- Brandi Disterheft
- Hilario Durán
- D.O.A.
- Wray Downes
- Emma Frank
- Sonny Greenwich
- Russell Gunn
- Murray Head
- Thomas Hellman
- Brian Hughes
- D.D. Jackson
- Ingrid Jensen
- Oliver Jones
- Sheila Jordan
- Hilary Kole
- Moe Koffman
- Diana Krall
- Michael Laucke
- Bryan Lee
- Lorne Lofsky
- Halie Loren
- Carmen Lundy
- Curtis Lundy
- Michael Marcus
- Miranie Morissette
- Montreal Jubilation Gospel Choir
- David Murray
- Jordan Officer
- Johnny O'Neal
- Alex Pangman
- P.J. Perry
- Hugh Ragin
- Adam Rudolph
- John Stetch
- Nelson Symonds
- Don Thompson
- Ed Thigpen
- David Virelles
- Oliver Whitehead
- World Saxophone Quartet
- Chet Doxas
