= 1986 in jazz =

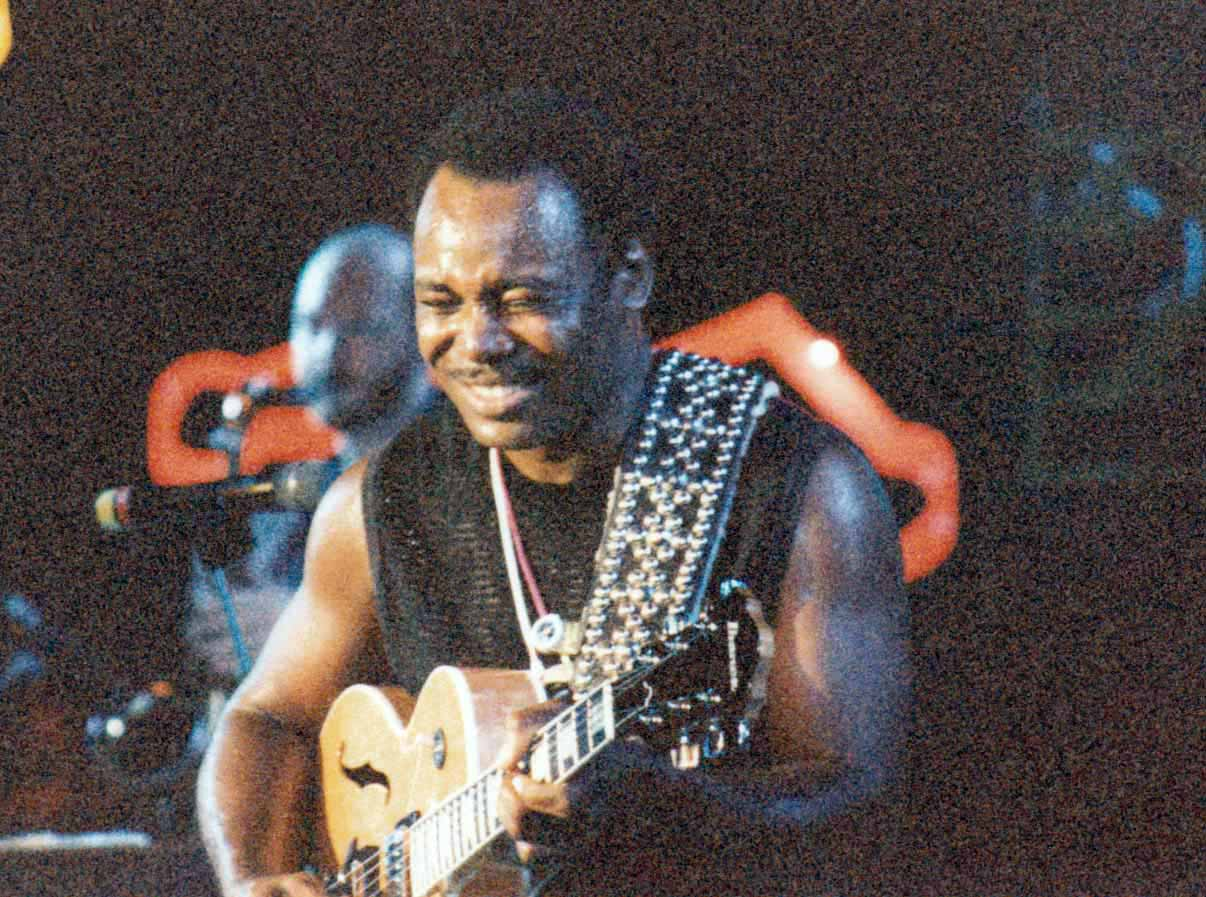
- George Benson in 1986 at Montreux Jazz Festival.
- Decade: 1980s in jazz
- Music: 1986 in music
- Standards: List of post-1950 jazz standards
- See also: 1985 in jazz – 1987 in jazz

This is a timeline documenting events of Jazz in the year 1986.

== Events ==
=== March ===
- 21 – The 13th Vossajazz started in Vossavangen, Norway (March 21 – 23).

=== May ===
- 16 – 15th Moers Festival started in Moers, Germany (May 16 – 19).
- 21 – 14th Nattjazz started in Bergen, Norway (May 21 – June 4).

=== June ===
- 27 – The 7th Montreal International Jazz Festival started in Montreal, Quebec, Canada (June 27 – July 6).

=== July ===
- 3 – The 20th Montreux Jazz Festival started in Montreux, Switzerland (July 43 – 19).
- 11 – The 11th North Sea Jazz Festival started in The Hague, Netherlands (July 11 – 13).

=== August ===
- 15 – The 3rd Brecon Jazz Festival started in Brecon, Wales (April 15 – 17).

=== September ===
- 19 – The 29th Monterey Jazz Festival started in Monterey, California (September 19 – 21).

== Album releases ==
- 16–17: 16–17
- Tim Berne: Fulton Street Maul
- Ran Blake: Short Life of Barbara Monk
- Larry Carlton: Alone / But Never Alone
- Larry Carlton: Discovery
- John Carter: Dance of Love Ghosts
- Steve Coleman: On the Edge of Tomorrow
- Christy Doran: Red Twist and Tuned Arrow
- Eliane Elias: Illusions
- ICP Orchestra: Bospaadje Konijnehol I
- Kenny G: Duotones
- Steve Lacy: Outings
- Last Exit: Last Exit
- Last Exit: Koln
- Lyle Mays: Lyle Mays
- Pat Metheny & Ornette Coleman: Song X
- James Newton: Romance and Revolution
- Evan Parker: Atlanta
- Evan Parker: The Snake Decides
- Courtney Pine: Journey to the Urge Within
- Ned Rothenberg: Trespass
- Arturo Sandoval: Tumbaito
- Sonny Sharrock: Guitar
- Michael Shrieve: In Suspect Terrain
- Jim Staley: Mumbo Jumbo
- Henry Threadgill: You Know the Number
- Cecil Taylor: For Olim
- Bobby Watson: Love Remains
- Kazumi Watanabe: Spice Of Life
- Reggie Workman: Synthesis
- John Zorn: Cobra
- Bill Bruford: Master Strokes 1978–1985

== Deaths ==
January

- 26 – Ken Moule, English pianist, composer, and arranger (born 1925).
- 29 – Everett Barksdale, American guitarist (born 1910).

February

- 26 – Karel Vlach, Czech musician, orchestra conductor, and arranger (born 1911).

March

- 21 – Raymond Burke, American clarinetist (born 1904).

April

- 26 – Cliff Leeman, American drummer (born 1913).

May

- 19 – Jimmy Lyons, American alto saxophonist (born 1931).
- 30 – Hank Mobley, American tenor saxophonist (born 1930).

June

- 13 – Benny Goodman, American clarinetist and bandleader (born 1909).
- 29 – Cliff Townshend, English saxophonist and clarinetist (born 1916).

July

- 3 – Curley Russell, American upright bassist (born 1917).
- 31 – Teddy Wilson, American pianist (born 1912).

August

- 21 – Thad Jones, American trumpeter (born 1923).

September

- 2 – Billy Taylor, American upright bassist (born 1906).
- 10 – Pepper Adams, American baritone saxophonist and composer (born 1930).

October

- 22 – Thorgeir Stubø, Norwegian guitarist, band leader, and composer (born 1943).
- 27 – Alan Branscombe, English pianist, vibraphonist, and alto saxophonist (born 1936).

November

- 3 – Eddie "Lockjaw" Davis, American tenor saxophonist (born 1922).
- 23 – Svein Øvergaard, Norwegian saxophonist and percussionist (born 1912).

December

- 2 – Paul Bascomb, American tenor saxophonist (born 1912).

Unknown date

- Arthur Rosebery, English pianist and singer (born 1904).

== Births ==
January

- 2 – Trombone Shorty, American trombonist, vocalist and composer.
- 4 – Theo Jackson, British songwriter, pianist and vocalist.
- 12 – Philip Schjetlein, Norwegian guitarist.
- 27 – Takashi Matsunaga, Japanese pianist and composer.

March

- 10 – Justin Kauflin, American pianist, composer, and record producer.
- 11 – Ayumi Tanaka, Japanese pianist.
- 19 – Susanne Sundfør, Norwegian singer and songwriter.

April

- 20 – Roxy Coss, American saxophonist and composer.
- 23 – Laura Mvula, British singer, songwriter, and composer.

May

- 18 – Adam Bałdych, Polish violinist, composer, music producer.
- 26 – Kit Downes, British pianist and composer.

June

- 24 – Ivan Blomqvist, Swedish pianist, keyboarder, and composer.

July

- 11 – Jakop Janssønn Hauan, Norwegian drummer.
- 21 – Rebecca Ferguson, British singer and songwriter.

October

- 10
  - Marcus Gilmore, American drummer.
  - Ellen Andrea Wang, Norwegian upright bassist and singer.

November

- 8 – Nikola Rachelle, British singer and songwriter.
- 11 – Jon Batiste, American singer, multi-instrumentalist, and bandleader.
- 12 – Jonas Kilmork Vemøy, Norwegian trumpeter, and composer.
- 13 – Miss Tati, Norwegian DJ, singer, and songwriter.

December

- 2 – Tal Wilkenfeld, Australian bass guitarist.
- 27 – Pablo Held, German pianist and composer.
- 29 – Sullivan Fortner, American pianist and composer.

Unknown date

- Adrián Carrio, Spanish pianist.
- Emilie Stoesen Christensen, Norwegian singer and actor.
- Jon Audun Baar, Norwegian drummer.
- Julia Kadel, German pianist, composer, and band leader.
- Lars Ove Fossheim, Norwegian jazz guitarist.
- Romano Ricciardi, Italian-Swiss saxophonist.
- Sasha Masakowski, American singer.

== See also ==
- 1980s in jazz
- List of years in jazz
- 1986 in music
