= 1980s in jazz =

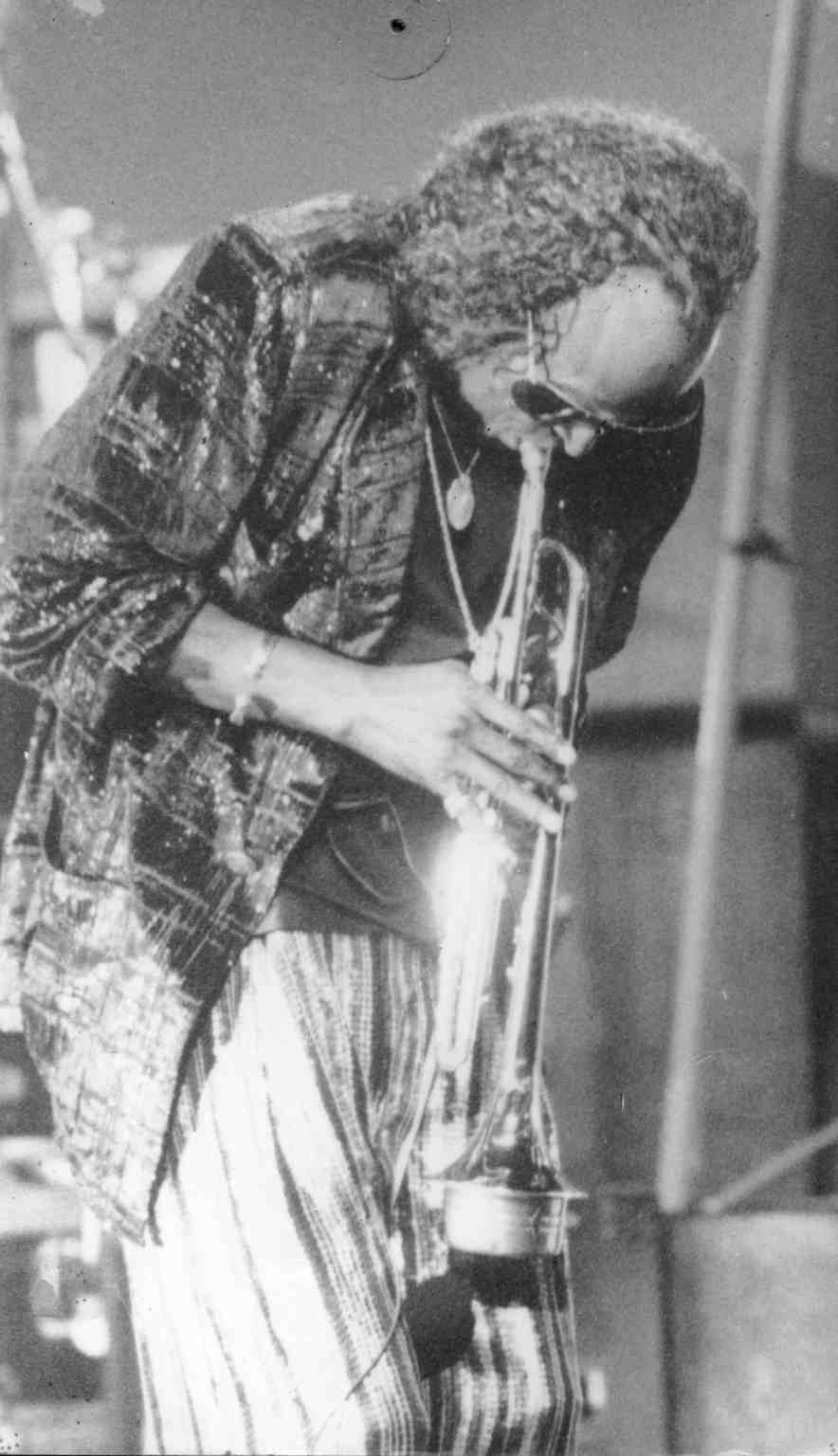
Miles Davis (pictured in 1984), whose 1970s fusion music helped lead to the development of smooth jazz in the 1980s.

In the 1980s in jazz, the jazz community shrank dramatically and split. A mainly older audience retained an interest in traditional and straight-ahead jazz styles. Wynton Marsalis strove to create music within what he believed was the tradition, creating extensions of small and large forms initially pioneered by such artists as Louis Armstrong and Duke Ellington. In the early 1980s, a commercial form of jazz fusion called pop fusion or "smooth jazz" became successful and garnered significant radio airplay. Smooth jazz saxophonists include Grover Washington Jr., Kenny G, Kirk Whalum, Boney James, and David Sanborn. Smooth jazz received frequent airplay with more straight-ahead jazz in "quiet storm" time slots at radio stations in urban markets across the U.S., helping to establish or bolster the careers of vocalists including Al Jarreau, Anita Baker, Chaka Khan, and Sade. In this same time period Chaka Khan released Echoes of an Era, which featured Joe Henderson, Freddie Hubbard, Chick Corea, Stanley Clarke, and Lenny White. She also released the song "And the Melody Still Lingers On (Night in Tunisia)" with Dizzy Gillespie reviving the solo break from "Night in Tunisia".

== Overview ==
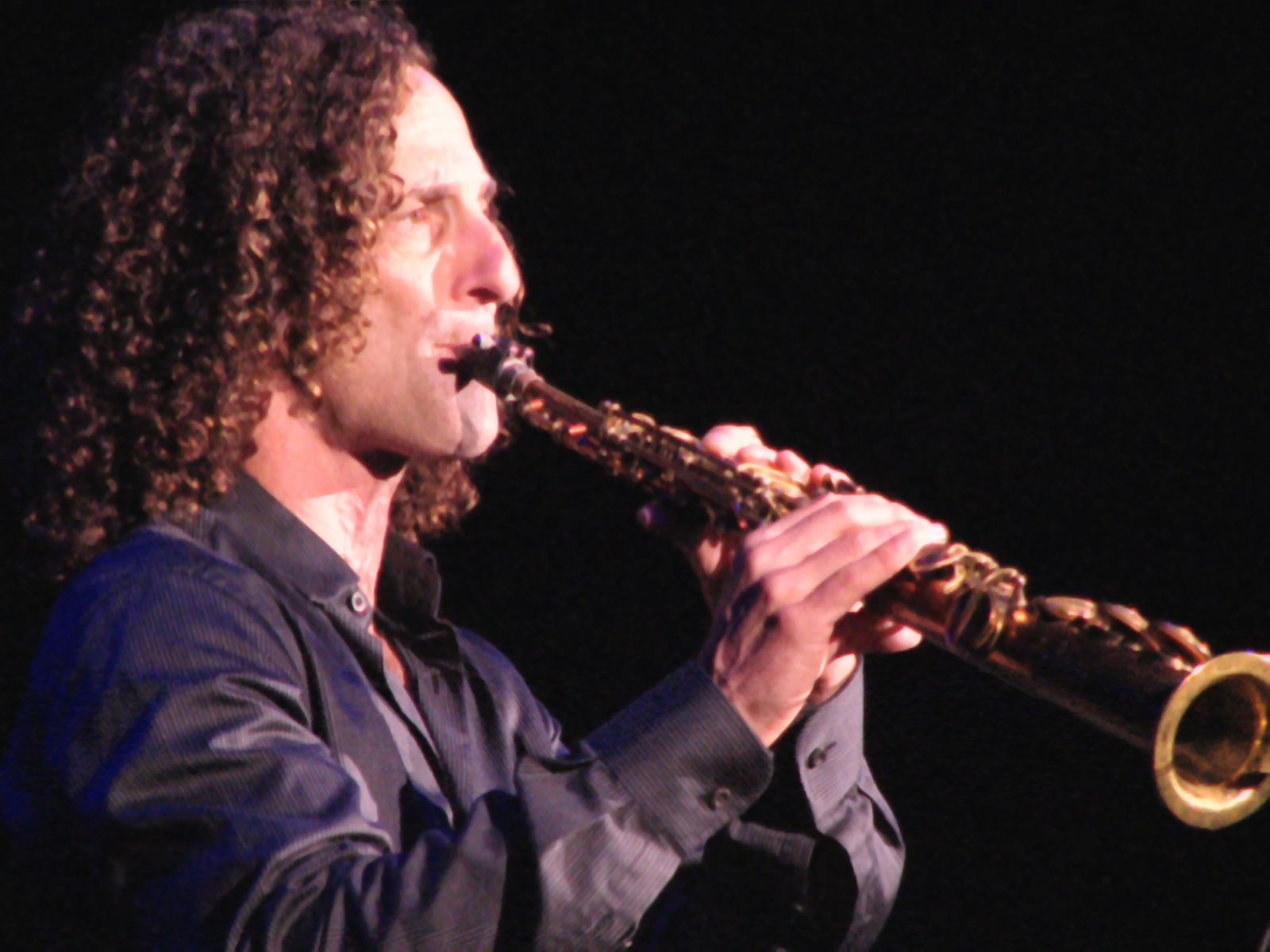
Kenny G, one of the leading smooth jazz artists which emerged in the 1980s

According to Robert Christgau, in the 1980s Miles Davis capitalized on the popularity of the electric fusion style he had pioneered in the 1970s. In the Newsweek article "The Problem With Jazz Criticism", Stanley Crouch considered Davis' playing of fusion as a turning point that led to smooth jazz. In Aaron J. West's introduction to his analysis of smooth jazz, "Caught Between Jazz and Pop" he states, "I challenge the prevalent marginalization and malignment of smooth jazz in the standard jazz narrative. Furthermore, I question the assumption that smooth jazz is an unfortunate and unwelcomed evolutionary outcome of the jazz-fusion era. Instead, I argue that smooth jazz is a long-lived musical style that merits multi-disciplinary analyses of its origins, critical dialogues, performance practice, and reception."

Acid jazz developed in the UK over the 1980s and 1990s and was influenced by jazz-funk and electronic dance music. Vibraphonist Roy Ayers is considered a forerunner of acid jazz. Although acid jazz often contains electronic composition (sometimes including sampling or live DJ cutting and scratching), it is just as likely to be played live by musicians who showcase jazz interpretation as part of their performance. Nu jazz is influenced by jazz harmony and melodies. There are usually no improvisational aspects. It ranges from combining live instrumentation with beats of jazz house, exemplified by St Germain, Jazzanova, and Fila Brazillia, to more band-based improvised jazz with electronic elements such as that of The Cinematic Orchestra, Kobol, and the Norwegian "future jazz" style pioneered by Bugge Wesseltoft, Jaga Jazzist, Nils Petter Molvær, and others. Nu jazz can be very experimental in nature and can vary widely in sound and concept.

Jazz rap developed in the late 1980s and early 1990s, and incorporates jazz influence into hip hop. In 1988, Gang Starr released the debut single "Words I Manifest", sampling Dizzy Gillespie's 1962 "Night in Tunisia", and Stetsasonic released "Talkin' All That Jazz", sampling Lonnie Liston Smith. Gang Starr's debut LP, No More Mr. Nice Guy (Wild Pitch, 1989), and their track "Jazz Thing" (CBS, 1990) for the soundtrack of Mo' Better Blues, sampling Charlie Parker and Ramsey Lewis. Gang Starr also collaborated with Branford Marsalis and Terence Blanchard. Groups making up the collective known as the Native Tongues Posse tended towards jazzy releases; these include the Jungle Brothers' debut Straight Out the Jungle (Warlock, 1988) and A Tribe Called Quest's People's Instinctive Travels and the Paths of Rhythm (Jive, 1990) and The Low End Theory (Jive, 1991).

In 1987, the US House of Representatives and Senate passed a resolution proposed by Democratic Representative John Conyers Jr. to define jazz as a unique form of American music stating, among other things, "...that jazz is hereby designated as a rare and valuable national American treasure to which we should devote our attention, support and resources to make certain it is preserved, understood and promulgated."

== 1980 ==
=== Album releases ===
- Anthony Davis: Lady of the Mirrors
- Rova Saxophone Quartet: Invisible Frames
- Om: Cerberus
- Pat Metheny: As Falls Wichita, so Falls Wichita Falls
- Billy Bang: Changing Seasons
- Julius Hemphill: Flat-Out Jump Suite
- Charles Noyes: Free Mammals
- Pat Metheny: 80/81
- Steve Tibbetts: Yr
- World Saxophone Quartet: W.S.Q.
- David Murray: Ming
- Ganelin Trio: Ancora da Capo
- Joanne Brackeen: Ancient Dynasty
- Ran Blake: Film Noir
- Muhal Richard Abrams: Mama and Daddy
- Derek Bailey: Aida
- Evan Parker: Six of One
- Steps Ahead: Step by Step
- Steve Beresford: Double Indemnity
- Music Revelation Ensemble: No Wave
- Jan Garbarek: Eventyr
- Dave Liebman: If They Only Knew
- Tom Varner: Quartet
- Harvie Swartz: Underneath It All
- Paul Winter: Callings
- World Saxophone Quartet: Revue
- James Ulmer: Are You Glad to Be in America?
- Kazumi Watanabe: To Chi Ka
- Chico Freeman: Peaceful Heart, Gentle Spirit
- Jack DeJohnette: Tin Can Alley
- Jay Clayton: All Out
- Ronald Shannon Jackson: Eye on You
- Art Pepper: Winter Moon

=== Deaths ===
- Bill Evans (August 16, 1929 – September 15, 1980)
- Ronnie Boykins (December 17, 1935 – April 20, 1980)
- Barney Bigard (March 3, 1906 – June 27, 1980)

=== Births ===
- Christina Bjordal (January 10), Norwegian guitarist
- Lars Horntveth (March 10), Norwegian saxophonist and guitarist
- Pål Hausken (August 25), Norwegian drummer
- Julie Dahle Aagård (September 25), Norwegian singer

== 1981 ==
=== Album releases ===
- Anthony Davis: Episteme (1981)
- Joe McPhee: Topology (1981)
- Paul Motian: Psalm (1981)
- Rova Saxophone Quartet: As Was (1981)
- Marilyn Crispell: Spirit Music (1981)
- Muhal Richard Abrams: Blues Forever (1981)
- Henry Kaiser: Aloha (1981)
- Sergey Kuryokhin: The Ways of Freedom (1981)
- David Moss: Terrain (1981)
- David Murray: Home (1981)
- Frank Lowe: Skizoke (1981)
- Willem Breuker: In Holland (1981)
- Ronald Shannon Jackson: Nasty (1981)
- Billy Bang: Rainbow Gladiator (1981)
- Don Moye: Black Paladins (1981)
- Frederic Hand: Heart's Song (1981)
- Jaco Pastorius: Word of Mouth (1981)
- Joanne Brackeen: Special Identity (1981)
- Hal Russell: NRG Ensemble (1981)
- Marvin Peterson: The Angels of Atlanta (1981)
- Jan Garbarek: Paths Prints (1981)
- Oscar Peterson: Nigerian Marketplace (1981)
- Saheb Sarbib: Aisha (1981)
- Ronald Shannon Jackson: Street Priest (1981)
- Steve Douglas: Rainbow Suite (1981)
- Steve Khan: Eyewitness (1981)
- Wynton Marsalis: Wynton Marsalis (1981)
- Keith Tippett: Mujician (1981)
- Larry Carlton: Strikes Twice

=== Deaths ===
- Sonny Red (December 17, 1932 – March 20, 1981)
- Mary Lou Williams (May 8, 1910 – May 28, 1981)
- Bob Bates (September 1, 1923 - September 13, 1981)
- Cat Anderson (12 September 1916 – 29 April 1981)
- Helen Humes (June 23, 1913 - September 9, 1981)
- Russell Procope (11 August 1908 – 21 January 1981)
- Bill Coleman (August 4, 1904 – August 24, 1981)
- Sam Jones (12 November 1924 – 15 December 1981)
- Tommy Turk (1927–1981)

=== Births ===
- Ivar Loe Bjørnstad, Norwegian drummer
- Hilde Marie Kjersem (April 27), Norwegian singer
- Sigurd Hole (July 13), Norwegian upright bassist

== 1982 ==
=== Album releases ===
- Anthony Davis: Variations In Dream-time (1982)
- Henry Threadgill: When Was That (1982)
- Air: 80° Below '82 (1982)
- Billy Bang: Outline No. 12 (1982)
- Dave Holland: Life Cycle (1982)
- David Murray: Murray's Steps (1982)
- Jane Ira Bloom: Mighty Lights (1982)
- Lol Coxhill: Instant Replay (1982)
- Dewey Redman: The Struggle Continues (1982)
- Steve Lacy: Flame (1982)
- Elements: Elements (1982)
- Errol Parker: Tentet (1982)
- James Ulmer: Black Rock (1982)
- Joe McPhee: Oleo (1982)
- John Carter: Dauwhe (1982)
- Sonny Simmons: Backwoods Suite (1982)
- Steps Ahead: Paradox (1982)
- Tony Coe: Tournee Du Chat (1982)
- Ronald Shannon Jackson: Mandance (1982)
- Warren Vaché: Midtown Jazz (1982)
- Paul Winter: Missa Gaia (1982)
- Cecil McBee: Flying Out (1982)
- Shadowfax: Shadowfax (1982)
- Jack DeJohnette: Inflation Blues (1982)
- Stanley Jordan: Touch Sensitive (1982)
- Kevin Eubanks: Guitarist (1982)
- Claus Ogerman and Michael Brecker: Cityscape (1982)

=== Deaths ===
- Thelonious Monk (October 10, 1917 – February 17, 1982)
- Sonny Stitt (February 2, 1924, - July 22, 1982)
- Gábor Szabó (March 8, 1936 - February 26, 1982)
- Art Pepper (September 1, 1925 – June 15, 1982)
- Cal Tjader (July 16, 1925 – May 5, 1982)
- Al Haig (July 19, 1924 – November 16, 1982)
- Sonny Greer (13 December 1895 – 23 March 1982)

=== Births ===
- Even Helte Hermansen (February 13), Norwegian guitarist
- Daniel Herskedal (April 2), Norwegian tubist
- Anders Hana (August 7), Norwegian guitarist

== 1983 ==
=== Album releases ===
- Borbetomagus: Barbed Wire Maggot (1983)
- Anthony Davis: Hemispheres (1983)
- Terje Rypdal: Eos (1983)
- Don Pullen: Evidence of Things Unseen (1983)
- James Newton: Luella (1983)
- Marilyn Crispell: Rhythms Hung in Undrawn Sky (1983)
- Ganelin Trio: Semplice (1983)
- Microscopic Septet: Take the Z Train (1983)
- Muhal Richard Abrams: Rejoicing with Light (1983)
- Tim Berne: Mutant Variations (1983)
- Steps Ahead: Steps Ahead (1983)
- Dollar Brand: Ekaya (1983)
- Jamaaladeen Tacuma: Show Stopper (1983)
- Paul Motian: The Story Of Maryam (1983)
- Joachim Kuhn: I'm Not Dreaming (1983)
- Kenny Wheeler: Double Double You (1983)
- L. Subramaniam: Spanish Wave (1983)
- Roger Neumann: Introducing Rather Large Band (1983)
- Dave Holland: Jumpin' In (1983)
- Henry Threadgill: Just the Facts (1983)
- George Russell: So What (1983)
- Derek Bailey: Epiphany (1982)
- Bobby Shew: Breakfast Wine (1983)
- Bob Wasserman: Solo (1983)
- Joe McPhee: Visitation (1983)
- Bobby Watson: Jewel (1983)
- Branford Marsalis: Scenes In The City (1983)
- Ronald Shannon Jackson: Barbeque Dog (1983)
- Shadowfax: Shadowdance (1983)

=== Deaths ===
- Roy Milton (July 31, 1907 – September 18, 1983)
- Kai Winding (May 18, 1922 – May 6, 1983)
- Gigi Gryce (November 28, 1925 — March 14, 1983)
- Earl Hines (December 28, 1903 – April 22, 1983)
- Paul Quinichette (17 May 1916 - 25 May 1983)
- Willie Bobo (February 28, 1934 – September 15, 1983)
- Ken Kersey (April 3, 1916 - April 1, 1983)
- Harry James (March 15, 1916 – July 5, 1983)

=== Births ===
- Mari Kvien Brunvoll, Norwegian singer
- Espen Berg (June 30), Norwegian pianist
- Svein Magnus Furu (November 10), Norwegian saxophonist

== 1984 ==
=== Album releases ===
- John Zorn: Locus Solus (1984)
- Geri Allen: Printmakers (1984)
- Steps Ahead: Modern Times (1984)
- Oliver Lake: Expandable Language (1984)
- Henry Threadgill: Subject To Change (1984)
- Hal Russell: Conserving NRG (1984)
- Microscopic Septet: Let's Flip (1984)
- Joachim Kuhn: Distance (1984)
- Henry Kaiser: Invite The Spirit (1984)
- Mark Helias: Split Image (1984)
- Hilton Ruiz: Crosscurrents (1984)
- Paul Motian: It Should've Happened A Long Time Ago (1984)
- Keith Tippett: A Loose Kite In A Gentle Wind (1984)
- Dave Holland: Seeds of Time (1984)
- James Williams: Alter Ego (1984)
- Andy Laverne: Liquid Silver (1984)
- Bobby McFerrin: The Voice (1984)

=== Deaths ===
- Red Garland (May 13, 1923 – April 23, 1984)
- Count Basie (August 21, 1904 – April 26, 1984)
- Vic Dickenson (August 6, 1906 - November 16, 1984)

=== Births ===
- Andrea Rydin Berge (April 12), Norwegian singer, pianist and autoharpist
- Frida Ånnevik (June 18), Norwegian singer

== 1985 ==
=== Album releases ===
- Butch Morris: Current Trends In Racism (1985)
- Bobby Previte: Bump The Renaissance (1985)
- George Russell: The African Game (1985)
- Rova Saxophone Quartet: Crowd (1985)
- Lyle Mays: Lyle Mays (1985)
- David Liebman: The Loneliness Of A Long-Distance Runner (1985)
- James Newton: Water Mystery (1985)
- Hank Robertson: Transparency (1985)
- David Torn: Best Laid Plans (1985)
- Borbetomagus: Borbeto Jam (1985)
- Mark Nauseef: Wun Wun (1985)
- Kip Hanrahan: Vertical Currency (1985)
- Patrick O'Hearn: Ancient Dreams (1985)
- Don Pullen: Sixth Sense (1985)
- John Carter: Castles of Ghana (1985)
- Gerry Hemingway: Outerbridge Crossing (1985)
- Leni Stern: Clairvoyant (1985)
- Marc Johnson: Bass Desires (1985)
- Terje Rypdal: Chasers (1985)
- Tom Harrell: Moon Alley (1985)
- Wynton Marsalis: Black Codes (1985)
- Wynton Marsalis: J Mood (1985)
- Paul Winter: Canyon (1985)
- Tony Williams: Civilization (1985)
- Michael Mantler: Alien (1985)
- Herbie Hancock: Village Life (1985)
- Manhattan Transfer: Vocalese (1985)

=== Deaths ===
- Philly Joe Jones (July 15, 1923 – August 30, 1985)
- Kenny Clarke (January 9, 1914 - January 26, 1985)
- Cootie Williams (July 10, 1911 - September 15, 1985)
- Jo Jones (October 7, 1911 – September 3, 1985)
- Benny Morton (January 31, 1907 – December 28, 1985)
- Dicky Wells (June 10, 1907 - November 12, 1985)

=== Births ===
- Per Arne Ferner, Norwegian guitarist
- Eyolf Dale (March 5), Norwegian pianist
- Ellen Brekken (June 20), Norwegian upright bassist, bass guitarist and tubist
- Kim Johannesen (August 22), Norwegian guitarist

== 1986 ==
=== Album releases ===
- John Zorn: Cobra (1986)
- Evan Parker: Atlanta (1986)
- ICP Orchestra: Bospaadje Konijnehol I (1986)
- 16-17: 16-17 (1986)
- Steve Coleman: On the Edge Of Tomorrow (1986)
- Steve Lacy: Outings (1986)
- Jim Staley: Mumbo Jumbo (1986)
- James Newton: Romance and Revolution (1986)
- Tim Berne: Fulton Street Maul (1986)
- Cecil Taylor: For Olim (1986)
- Last Exit: Last Exit (1986)
- Michael Shrieve: In Suspect Terrain (1986)
- Kazumi Watanabe: Spice Of Life (1986)
- Lyle Mays: Lyle Mays (1986)
- Ned Rothenberg: Trespass (1986)
- Sonny Sharrock: Guitar (1986)
- Evan Parker: The Snake Decides (1986)
- Courtney Pine: Journey to the Urge Within (1986)
- Henry Threadgill: You Know the Number (1986)
- Pat Metheny & Ornette Coleman: Song X (1986)
- Last Exit: Koln (1986)
- John Carter: Dance of Love Ghosts (1986)
- Kenny G: Duotones (1986)
- Reggie Workman: Synthesis (1986)
- Ran Blake: Short Life of Barbara Monk (1986)
- Bobby Watson: Love Remains (1986)
- Christy Doran: Red Twist and Tuned Arrow (1986)
- Arturo Sandoval: Tumbaito (1986)
- Larry Carlton: Alone / But Never Alone
- Larry Carlton: Discovery

=== Deaths ===
- Jimmy Lyons (December 1, 1931 – May 19)
- Hank Mobley (July 7, 1930 – May 30)
- Benny Goodman (May 30, 1909 – June 13)
- Curley Russell (March 19, 1917 – July 3)
- Teddy Wilson (November 24, 1912 – July 31)
- Thad Jones (March 28, 1923 – August 21)
- Billy Taylor (April 3, 1906 – September 2)
- Eddie Davis (March 2, 1922 – November 3)

=== Births ===
- Jon Audun Baar, Norwegian drummer
- Emilie Stoesen Christensen, Norwegian singer and actor
- Ayumi Tanaka (March 11), Japanese pianist
- Jakop Janssønn Hauan (July 11), Norwegian drummer
- Ellen Andrea Wang (October 10), Norwegian upright-bassist and singer
- Jon Batiste (November 11), American singer, multi-instrumentalist, and bandleader
- Tal Wilkenfeld (December 2), Australian bass guitarist

== 1987 ==
=== Album releases ===
- Henry Threadgill: Easily Slip Into Another World (1987)
- Anthony Davis: Undine (1987)
- Steve Lacy: Momentum (1987)
- John Zorn: Spillane (1987)
- Hank Roberts: Black Pastels (1987)
- Marilyn Crispell: Labyrinths (1987)
- Guy Klucevsek: Scenes From A Mirage (1987)
- David Torn: Cloud About Mercury (1987)
- Bobby Previte: Dull Bang, Gushing Sound, Human Shriek (1987)
- Tim Berne: Sanctified Dreams (1987)
- Borbetomagus: Fish That Sparkling Bubble (1987)
- Marty Ehrlich: Pliant Plaint (1987)
- Tim Berne: Fulton Street Maul (1987)
- Benny Carter: Central City Sketches (1987)
- Bobby Previte: Pushing The Envelope (1987)
- Phil Woods: Bouquet (1987)
- Danny Gottlieb: Aquamarine (1987)
- Dave Holland: Razor's Edge (1987)
- Elements: Illumination (1987)
- Henry Kaiser: Crazy-backwards Alphabet (1987)
- Henry Kaiser: Devil In The Drain (1987)
- Kenny Wheeler: Flutter By Butterfly (1987)
- Mark Helias: The Current Set (1987)
- Michael Brecker: Michael Brecker (1987)
- Montreaux: Sign Language (1987)
- Sonny Sharrock: Seize the Rainbow (1987)
- Mulgrew Miller: Wingspan (1987)
- Neil Swainson: 49th Parallel (1987)
- Earthworks: Earthworks (1987)
- Chick Corea Elektric Band: Light Years (1987)

=== Deaths ===
- Buddy Rich (September 30, 1917 – April 2, 1987)
- Jaco Pastorius (December 1, 1951 – September 21, 1987)
- Maxine Sullivan (May 13, 1911 – April 7, 1987)
- Freddie Green (March 31, 1911 – March 1, 1987)
- Woody Herman (May 16, 1913 – October 29, 1987)
- Howard McGhee (March 6, 1918 – July 17, 1987)

=== Births ===
- Hanne Kalleberg, Norwegian singer and composer
- Eldar Djangirov (January 28), American pianist
- Trygve Waldemar Fiske (February 15), Norwegian upright-bassist
- Marte Eberson (December 12), Norwegian keyboardist
- Julian Lage (December 25), American guitarist

== 1988 ==
=== Events ===
- Jazz guitarist Larry Carlton is shot in a random gun shooting outside his Los Angeles studios.

=== Album releases ===
- Bill Frisell: Before We Were Born (1988)
- Henry Threadgill: Rag Bush And All (1988)
- Turtle Island String Quartet: Turtle Island String Quartet (1988)
- Lyle Mays: Street Dreams (1988)
- Dave Holland: Triplicate (1988)
- Jackie McLean: Dynasty (1988)
- John Carter: Fields (1988)
- Leni Stern: Secrets (1988)
- Microscopic Septet: Beauty Based on Science (1988)
- Music Revelation Ensemble: Music Revelation Ensemble (1988)
- Willem Breuker: Psalm 122 (1988)
- Steve Turre: Fire and Ice (1988)
- Trilok Gurtu: Usfret (1988)
- Bobby Previte: Claude's Late Morning (1988)
- Bill Frisell: Lookout for Hope (1988)
- Misha Mengelberg: Impromptus (1988)
- Marcus Roberts: Truth is Spoken Here (1988)
- David Ware: Passage To Music (1988)
- David Liebman: Trio + One (1988)
- Freddie Hubbard: Stardust (1988)
- Gary Thomas: Code Violations (1988)
- Hilton Ruiz: El Camino (1988)
- Phil Woods: Evolution (1988)
- Ralph More: Rejuvenate (1988)

=== Deaths ===
- Chet Baker (December 23, 1929 – May 13, 1988)
- Gil Evans (13 May 1912 – 20 March 1988)
- Eddie Vinson (December 18, 1917 – July 2, 1988)
- Tommy Potter (September 21, 1918 - March 1, 1988)
- Sy Oliver (December 17, 1910 – May 28, 1988)
- J. C. Heard (August 10, 1917, in Dayton, Ohio – September 27, 1988)

=== Births ===
- Fredrik Luhr Dietrichson (February 5), Norwegian upright bassist

== 1989 ==
=== Album releases ===
- Marty Ehrlich: Traveller's Tale
- Tim Berne: Fractured Fairy Tales
- Joe Maneri: Kalavinka
- 16-17: When All Else Fails
- Joe Lovano: Worlds
- Nimal: Nimal
- John Oswald: Plunderphonics
- Michael Shrieve: Stiletto
- Dave Holland: Extensions
- Andrew Hill: Eternal Spirit
- Christy Doran: Phoenix
- Henry Kaiser: Re-Marrying For Money
- Michael Shrieve: Big Picture
- Muhal Richard Abrams: Hearinga Suite
- Don Pullen: Song Everlasting
- Fred Hersh: Heartsongs
- Geri Allen: Twylight
- Leni Stern: Closer to the Light
- Ganelin Trio: Cantabile
- Marty Fogel: Many Bobbing Heads
- London Jazz Composers Orchestra:Harmos
- Montreaux: Let Them Say
- No Safety: This Lost Leg
- John Carter: Shadows on a Wall
- Ralph Peterson: Triangular
- Ray Anderson: Blues Bred
- King Ubu Orchestru: Binaurality
- Evan Parker: Conic Sections
- Dewey Redman: Living on the Edge
- Charles Earland: Third Degree Burn
- John Scofield: Time on My Hands
- Roy Hargrove: Diamond in the Rough
- Tom Harrell: Sail Away
- Tommy Flanagan: Jazz Poet
- Larry Carlton: On Solid Ground
- Neal Schon:Late Nite

=== Deaths ===
- Phineas Newborn Jr. (December 14, 1931 – May 26, 1989)
- Woody Shaw (December 24, 1944 – May 10, 1989)
- Roy Eldridge (January 30, 1911 – February 26, 1989)
- Kenny Hagood (1926 - November 9, 1989)

=== Births ===
- Hans Hulbækmo, Norwegian drummer
