= Sleepwalk =

Sleepwalk may refer to:

- Sleepwalking or somnambulism, a sleep disorder
- Sleepwalk (film), a 1986 American film directed by Sara Driver
- Sleepwalk, a 1991 novel by John Saul
- Sleepwalk (comics), a DC Comics supervillain

== Music ==
- "Sleep Walk", an instrumental by Santo & Johnny, 1959
- "Sleepwalk" (song), by Ultravox, 1980
- "Sleepwalk", a song by Christian Death from Catastrophe Ballet, 1984
- "Sleepwalk", a song by Zior Park, 2019
- Sleepwalk, a 1982 album by Larry Carlton
- Sleepwalk, a 2000 album by Matrix
- Sleepwalk, a 2007 album by Astral
- Sleepwalk, a shoegaze band from Chicago, IL

== See also ==
- Sleepwalker (disambiguation)
- Sleepwalking (disambiguation)
