= Larry Carlton (disambiguation) =

Larry Carlton (born 1948) is an American guitarist.

Lawrence or Larry Carlton may also refer to:

- Larry Carlton (album)
- Lawrence K. Karlton, American judge
