= Petras Vyšniauskas =

Lithuanian saxophonist and university teacher

Petras Vyšniauskas (born 11 June 1957 in Plungė) is a Lithuania multi-instrumentalist (mainly soprano saxophone) of Modern Creative Jazz and a university teacher as a music teacher at the Lithuanian Academy of Music and Theatre in Vilnius.

== Life ==
Vysniauskas has previously worked with such musicians as Steve Lacy, Han Bennink, Jon Christensen, Kent Carter, Tomas Kutavičius, Elliott Sharp, Paul Jeffrey, the Rova Saxophone Quartet, Charlie Mariano, Karl Berger, Bobo Stenson, Reiner Winterschladen, Hilliard Greene, Vijay Iyer, Robert Dick, John Lindberg, Eric Vloeimans, Mark Tokar and others. Together with Klaus Kugel he recorded the film music for the German movie Leni. Both have been members of Vyacheslav Ganelin's Ganelin Trio Priority since 1999. In 1999 he appeared in Theo Jörgensmann Sextett in Wuppertal (Fellowship).

He also directs the quartet Poksis with Lithuanian guitarist Juozas Milasius, Russian double bass player Vladimir Volkov and drummer Klaus Kugel. Currently Vysniauskas plays in the Vilnius Power Trio with Juozas Milasius and drummer Dalius Naujokaitis.

The Vilnius-based musician combines the music of his Lithuanian homeland with modern sounds and is one of the musicians who set important accents in European jazz. Critic Bert Noglik wrote about Petras Vysniauskas: "His music breathes some of the austere beauty of the Lithuanian landscape and the passion of many of his compatriots. It was the music of Petras Vysniauskas, which I remembered for its clear, individual conception". Vysniauskas by his own account "in Lithuanian folk songs, [hears] echoes of the music of John Coltrane", which he tries to combine with the free expression of today's jazz.

Critic Howard Mandel of the Jazz Journalists Association has described him as "one of the most profoundly original musicians concentrating on [the soprano saxophone]".

From 1988 to 2003 he was senior assistant, from 2003 lecturer and now professor at the Music and Theater Academy of Lithuania. He is one of the most acclaimed musicians of his country, having been decorated with multiple awards, including Musician of the Year of the Soviet Union in the 1980s, Order of the Lithuanian Grand Duke Gediminas, the Lithuanian National Arts and Culture Prize, the Baltic Assembly Prize for the Arts and the award of the Vilnius Jazz Festival.

His son is the trumpeter Dominykas Vysniauskas and his daughter the singer Marija Vysniauskaite, with whom he performs as Cherry Trio.

== Discography (selection) ==
- Viennese Concert (Leo Records, 1989)
- Lithuania (ITM, 1990) with Arkadij Gotesman
- Vysniauskas-Christoph Baumann-Siron: Nuit Balte (1994)
- Fellowship (1999) with Theo Jörgensmann, Charlie Mariano, Karl Berger, Kent Carter and Klaus Kugel
- Petras Vysniauskas Quartet Light In The Dark (2003)
- Baltic Trio Live at Jazz Welten Dresden 2005 (2005) with Vladimir Volkov and Klaus Kugel
- Ganelin Trio Priority Visions (2007) with Vyacheslav Ganelin and Klaus Kugel
