= French horn in jazz =

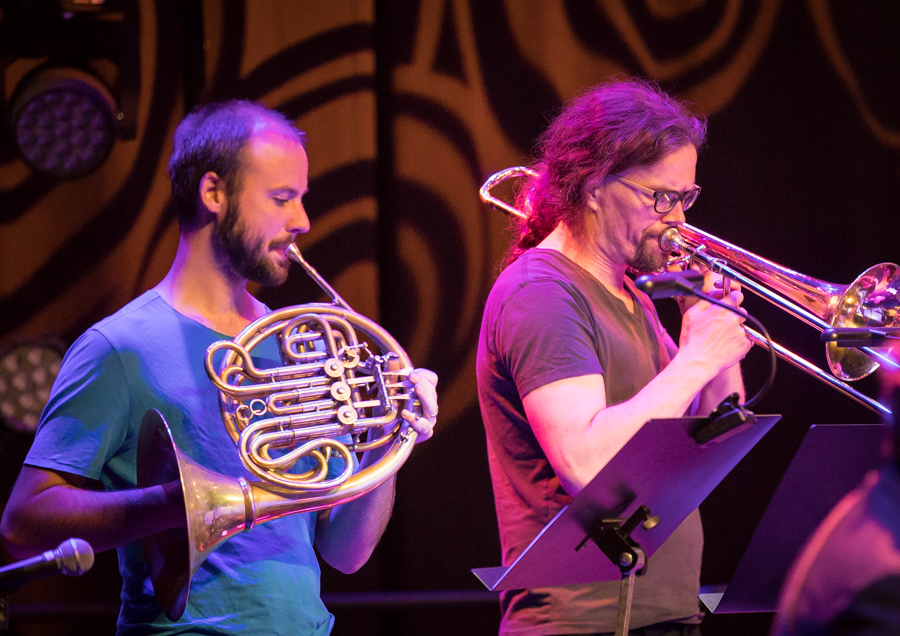
Daniel W. Knellesvik (Left) and Erik Johannessen (Right) with Trondheim jazz Orchestra, Eirik Hegel and Joshua Redman at the stage of Kongsberg Music Theatre. Kongsberg jazz festival, July 6th. 2017.

While the French horn is primarily used in classical music pieces, in the mid-20th century it broke into the jazz world. While the instrument remains relatively rare, the role of the French horn in jazz has developed from its beginnings in the 1940s through to the 2010s. Note that the expression "horns" in jazz is often used colloquially to refer to all wind instruments used in jazz (e.g., trumpet, sax, trombone, etc.).

== Beginnings ==
The Claude Thornhill Orchestra was the first group to incorporate the French horn into a jazz ensemble. In early 1940, the Claude Thornhill Orchestra had moved out to southern California. During this time, the Thornhill band was moving jazz in an entirely new direction, creating an entirely new sound. Thornhill's original band comprised twelve musicians, all playing traditionally "jazz" instruments. When Thornhill hired Bill Borden as an arranger, they created a group with a more orchestral style. Their new sound involved using instruments that were not typical to jazz and mixing unusual instrument voicing.

Around the same time, Julius Watkins joined a six-member jazz band playing French horn. Watkins had previously worked and toured with Ernie Fields' band for three years, only playing extra trumpet parts as needed. The band played together for a short while, about a year, and then dissolved in 1943. After playing in dance bands for a few years, Watkins was offered to play in Milt Buckner's jazz band in Detroit. He then found himself in high demand, as the only jazz French horn player in the Midwest. Watkins played not only with Buckner's band on recording dates but also with Milt Jackson's small group. He recorded his first featured solo tune with Buckner's band in 1949, a song titled Yesterdays.

In the 1950s, hearing the French horn in jazz was not as common as one might think, even though bands had been using them for almost a decade already. Lionel Hampton's band rather haphazardly picked up Willie Ruff on French horn in 1954. After Hampton's band played on The Ed Sullivan Show, Ruff called his friend Ivory Mitchell, the group's pianist, who convinced Ruff to come play with the group for a gig the following evening. Immediately after the group finished the performance, Hampton hired Ruff into the group.

== Headline roles ==
After the French horn found a home in larger ensembles, many players were frustrated with being stuck in a supporting role. Many notable French horn musicians struck out in smaller groups, giving the instrument a headliner role in jazz combos. A good account of the presence of the French horn in jazz is Ronald Sweetman's study, A Preliminary Chronology of the Use of the French Horn in Jazz, Further Rev. 1991 Text, Montréal Vintage Society, 1991, ISBN 1-895002-05-2.

=== Julius Watkins Sextet ===
In 1950, Watkins moved to New York City to study at the Manhattan School of Music. While working with Milt Buckner’s group, Watkins felt that he wasn't integrated properly into the group with respect to Buckner's arrangements. He continued recording with notable artists like Thelonious Monk but was not satisfied being a sideman anymore. In July 1954 the Julius Watkins Sextet was born. The team comprised Watkins on French horn, Frank Foster on tenor saxophone, Perry Lopez on guitar, Oscar Pettiford on bass, Kenny Clarke on drums and George Butcher on piano. Together the sextet recorded nine tracks on two albums. Watkins himself wrote six original compositions featured on those albums.

=== Mitchell-Ruff Duo ===
Ruff and Ivory Mitchell struck out to form the Mitchell-Ruff Duo after leaving Lionel Hampton’s band. As it turns out, Ruff and Mitchell played together when they were stationed at Lockebourne Air Base outside of Columbus, OH. The first time around the duo starred Mitchell on piano and Ruff on bass, which he picked up to play a gig at Mitchell’s request. This time Ruff played French horn, occasionally bass, and Mitchell piano. They worked tirelessly and played opposite a number of popular groups, performing during intermission at Café Bohemia for Max Roach, Stan Getz, Horace Silver, J.J. Johnson and Jimmy Smith.

The duo moved from Café Bohemia to Birdland when they were booked as Count Basie’s intermission band. Knowing that they could not compete directly with Basie's hard-swinging blues, the duo capitalized on their contrast from Basie’s sound, playing with a soft and mellow sound. By showcasing their different sound, Ruff and Mitchell continued to get bookings from Birdland to play intermission for other big name groups like Miles Davis, Dizzy Gillespie, Sarah Vaughan, Lester Young, Dinah Washington and others.

== Gil Evans' influence ==
After working with Claude Thornhill and arranging for his orchestra, Gil Evans began arranging for Miles Davis. In 1948 the Miles Davis Nonet was formed with a sound completely unlike anything jazz listeners had heard before. The original idea for the nonet was to achieve a sound like the Thornhill Orchestra but with fewer personnel. The group sent jazz off into a new path away from the huge big band, which was popular at the time. However they did adopt the new instrumentation with French horn, which would stay in Evans’ arrangements throughout the rest of his career.

The Miles Davis Nonet recorded “Birth of the Cool” from January 1949 until March 1950 and rotated through three different French horn players on the recordings, Gunther Schuller, Junior Collins and Sandy Siegelstein.

Gil Evans continued to arrange and compose after he left Miles Davis. He created a larger jazz orchestra, upwards of 16 musicians. Evans arranged and recorded well into the 1980s. Most of his recordings with his orchestra incorporated French horn and other non-traditional jazz instruments. Evans allowed for French horn players to have a more stable role in playing and recording jazz.

== Third stream ==
The term "third stream" was coined in 1957 by Gunther Schuller, composer and hornist, to describe a fusion of jazz improvisation and classical music. This new genre gave the French horn a more permanent place that traditional jazz groups could not offer.

=== John Graas ===
John Graas is one of the foremost orchestral jazz arrangers. Before arranging Graas played French horn with many famous jazz musicians such as Paul Whiteman, Stan Kenton and Glenn Miller. In the early 1950s he began composing third stream music, even before there was a term to define it. Throughout his career he would arrange and play many popular jazz sound tracks. His greatest accomplishments though are his jazz compositions for orchestra with French horn.

=== Gunther Schuller ===
From a young age Schuller listened to both jazz and classical music. Having grown up in a home with his father a violinist, he originally considered classical music of higher quality musically and culturally than jazz. One night Schuller had an epiphany while listening to Duke Ellington that jazz was not as lowbrow as his father had originally considered. He began transcribing Ellington's recordings and studying his work, which was very similar to the way he started with classical recordings. After a while, Schuller started playing in jazz groups, at a time when there were still relatively few French horns in jazz groups.

Schuller got his start conducting when working in a group with JJ Johnson. Johnson would write huge multi-movement works and Schuller, being the only conductor, was left to pick it up. He then got involved in composing and arranging, though he began composing without recognition earlier. His first piece, “Jumpin in the Future” was an atonal jazz composition based on 12-tone music.

However once Schuller began composing, he stopped playing French horn. Once he spent too much time away from the instrument, he believed he no longer had the chops to continue playing. Still, most of his third stream works include horn parts.

== Contemporary French horn in jazz ==
Many contemporary jazz French horn players have made a name for themselves in the 70s, 80s, 90s, and 00s. Some popular jazz hornists were taught privately by the breakthrough jazz horn players. Besides those mentioned below, other important jazz French horn players include Robert Routch, Adam Unsworth, Jim Rattigan, Richard Todd, Arkady Shilkloper, Giovanni Hoffer, Sharon Freeman, Peter Gordon, and Marshall Sealy.

=== Musicians ===
==== John Clark ====
John Clark is perhaps the most important French hornist in jazz after Julius Watkins, and plays on many jazz and studio dates, and is still active today.

==== Adam Unsworth ====
Soloist and recording artist Adam Unsworth is Associate Professor of Horn at the University of Michigan in Ann Arbor. As a performer he is dedicated to commissioning and performing works of living composers, with a goal of expanding repertoire and redefining the boundaries of the French horn. His newest release titled Balance is a jazz recording for French horn, jazz quintet, and chamber orchestra, which features arrangements of his original compositions.

==== Tom Bacon ====
Tom Bacon is considered one of the founders of modern jazz French horn playing. After Julius Watkins' death, Tom Bacon picked up his idea of having the horn featured in the jazz setting. He is a virtuoso, beginning his professional career at 18 with the Chicago Civic Orchestra. Though most of Bacon's musical education was not in jazz, he was inspired by greats such as Duke Ellington and Ella Fitzgerald to play jazz. He recorded an album The Flipside featuring literature written exclusively for solo jazz French horn; seven of the works were written specifically for Bacon with two written by himself.

==== Tom Varner ====
Tom Varner is now one of the most well known jazz French horn musicians. He studied under Julius Watkins in the 1970s. After working with many notable jazz musicians and groups as a sideman, he broke out to lead his own group. Beginning in the 1980s he started his own groups, featuring the French horn. Even today he is composing and leading recordings. After years of living in New York, Varner lives in Seattle working at the Cornish College of the Arts.

==== Vincent Chancey ====
Another student of Julius Watkins, Vincent Chancey is another example of contemporary artists featuring their skills on the French horn in jazz. After having played as a side man on over 150 recordings, Chancey began recording his own jazz albums, featuring the horn. His first album released in 1993 entitled Welcome, Mr. Chancey comprised a quartet featuring Chancey on horn with electric guitar, bass and drums. In 1996, he released a second album, Vincent Chancey and Next Mode with himself and four other instruments, tenor saxophone, piano, bass and drums.

==== Arkady Shilkloper ====
Born in Moscow, Shilkloper has mastered extended techniques for both the French horn and the alphorn. According to Leonard Feather, his control of the French horn and his creativity have set a new standard. https://en.wikipedia.org/wiki/Arkady_Shilkloper

==== Mark Taylor ====
Born in Chattanooga, Tennessee, Mark Taylor is a member of the "next generation" of jazz French hornists. After graduate studies with Dave Holland and George Russell at New England Conservatory in Boston, Mark moved to New York where he has performed and recorded with an array of modern giants and released three CDs as a leader, QuietLand on Mapleshade Records and Circle Squared and At What Age on his own Taymons Music label. Mark has worked with jazz legend Max Roach as a featured soloist and critically acclaimed cutting-edge composers Henry Threadgill (Very Very Circus), Muhal Richard Abrams and Anthony Braxton, among others. He has performed in jazz clubs, festivals and concert halls from Finland to Syria and was a featured performer at the very first Julius Watkins Jazz Horn Festival at New York City's Knitting Factory.

==== Alex Brofsky ====
After recording more "traditional" jazz styles with notable artists such as Sonny Rollins, Miles Davis and Gil Evans, Alex Brofsky took the French horn into acid jazz. He has experimented with many different styles and has found success with his acid jazz band AB+. His latest work is a collaborative effort with vocalist Michael Slattery (Helen's Funeral Band - Living Slowly). He is also going to release an album through a U.K. Label - Adaptation Music. Alex Brofsky is featured on Stalley's release Ohio in 2014. He wrote and played the French Horn and Rhodes 73 parts over a beat by D.A. Doman for the song "What it Be Like." The track was produced by David D.A. Doman for Maybach Music and features Stalley and Nipsey Hussle.

=== Julius Watkins Jazz French Horn Festival ===
The Julius Watkins Jazz French Horn Festival was organized by Tom Varner and was held annually from 1994 until 1998 in New York City, beginning at the Knitting Factory. The Festival was made to honor Watkins' legacy and promote the continued progress of the art of jazz horn. In its first five years, performers and speakers included Varner, John Clark, Vincent Chancey, Mark Taylor, David Amram, Doug Hill, Deborah Thurlow, Robert Routch, Marshall Sealy, Alex Brofsky, and Ray Alonge. After an 11-year hiatus, the festival was revived in 2009 by Tom Varner in Seattle at the Cornish College of the Arts, featuring Varner, Vincent Chancey, John Clark and Adam Unsworth, all premier contemporary jazz hornists.
