= Sleepwalker =

Sleepwalker(s) or The Sleepwalker(s) may refer to:

- Sleepwalking or somnambulism, a sleep disorder

== Film and television ==
=== Films ===
- The Sleepwalker (1922 film), an American silent film directed by Edward LeSaint
- The Sleepwalker (1942 film), a Disney animated short film featuring Pluto
- The Sleepwalker (1951 film), a French film directed by Maurice Labro
- Sleepwalkers (1978 film), a Spanish film by Manuel Gutiérrez Aragón
- Sleepwalker, a 1984 film featuring Fulton Mackay
- Sleepwalkers (1992 film), an American horror film written by Stephen King
- Sleepwalker (2000 film), a Swedish horror-thriller film directed by Johannes Runeborg
- Sleepwalker (2011 film), a Hong Kong film directed by Oxide Pang
- The Sleepwalker (2014 film), a Norwegian-American drama directed by Mona Fastvold
- The Sleepwalker (2015 film), a Canadian animated short film directed by Theodore Ushev
- Sleepwalker (2017 film), an American mystery film directed by Elliott Lester
- The Sleepwalkers (2019 film), an Argentine film directed by Paula Hernández
- Sleepwalker (2026 film), an American film directed by Brandon Auman

=== Television ===
- Sleepwalkers (TV series), a 1997–98 American science fiction series
- "The Sleepwalker" (The Honeymooners), a television episode
- "The Sleepwalker", an episode of Strange Experiences

== Literature ==
- Sleepwalker (character), a Marvel Comics character
- The Sleepwalker (novel), a 2008 novel by Robert Muchamore
- The Sleepwalker (Fear Street), a 1990 novel by R. L. Stine
- The Sleepwalkers (Broch novel), a 1930s novel in three parts by Hermann Broch
- The Sleepwalkers: A History of Man's Changing Vision of the Universe, a 1959 book by Arthur Koestler
- The Sleepwalkers: How Europe Went to War in 1914, a 2012 book by Christopher Clark

== Music ==
- La sonnambula (The Sleepwalker), an 1831 opera semiseria by Vincenzo Bellini

=== Albums ===
- Sleepwalker (The Kinks album) or the title song (see below), 1977
- Sleepwalker (EP), by Kylie and Garibay, 2014
- Sleepwalker, by JamisonParker, 2005
- Sleepwalkers (Brian Fallon album) or the title song, 2018
- Sleepwalkers (David Sylvian album) or the title song, 2010
- Sleepwalkers, by Dead Swans, 2009

=== Songs ===
- "Sleepwalker" (Adam Lambert song), 2011
- "Sleepwalker" (The Kinks song), 1977
- "Sleepwalker" (Nightwish song), 2000
- "Sleepwalker", by Ava Max from Diamonds & Dancefloors, 2023
- "Sleepwalker", by Bonnie McKee, 2013
- "Sleepwalker", by Daniel Johns from Talk, 2015
- "Sleepwalker", by Faunts from M4, 2006
- "Sleepwalker", by Gang of Four from Shrinkwrapped, 1995
- "Sleepwalker", by the Killers from Pressure Machine, 2021
- "Sleepwalker", by King Gizzard & the Lizard Wizard from Oddments, 2014
- "Sleepwalker", by Logan Henderson, 2017
- "Sleepwalker", by Megadeth from United Abominations, 2007
- "Sleepwalker", by Of Monsters and Men from Fever Dream, 2019
- "Sleepwalker", by Parkway Drive from Deep Blue, 2010
- "Sleepwalker", by the Wallflowers from Breach, 2000
- "Sleepwalker", by Xmal Deutschland from Devils, 1989
- "The Sleepwalker", by Cat Power from Dear Sir, 1995
- "Sleepwalkers", by Bone Thugs-n-Harmony from The Collection, 2000
- "Sleepwalkers", by Draconian from Under a Godless Veil, 2020
- "Sleepwalkers", by They Might Be Giants from No!, 2002
- "Sleepwalkers", by the Hundred in the Hands from This Desert, 2010
- "The Sleepwalkers", by Level 42 from Running in the Family, 1987
- "The Sleepwalkers", by Van Der Graaf Generator from Godbluff, 1975

== Other uses ==
- Sleepwalker (Štyrský), a 1925 painting by Jindřich Štyrský
- Sleepwalker (video game), a 1993 platform game
- Sleepwalkers (video installation), a 2007 outdoor film installation by Doug Aitken

== See also ==
- Sleepwalk (disambiguation)
- Sleepwalking (disambiguation)
