= The Baked Potato =

Jazz club in Los Angeles, California

Coordinates: 34°8′12″N 118°21′47″W

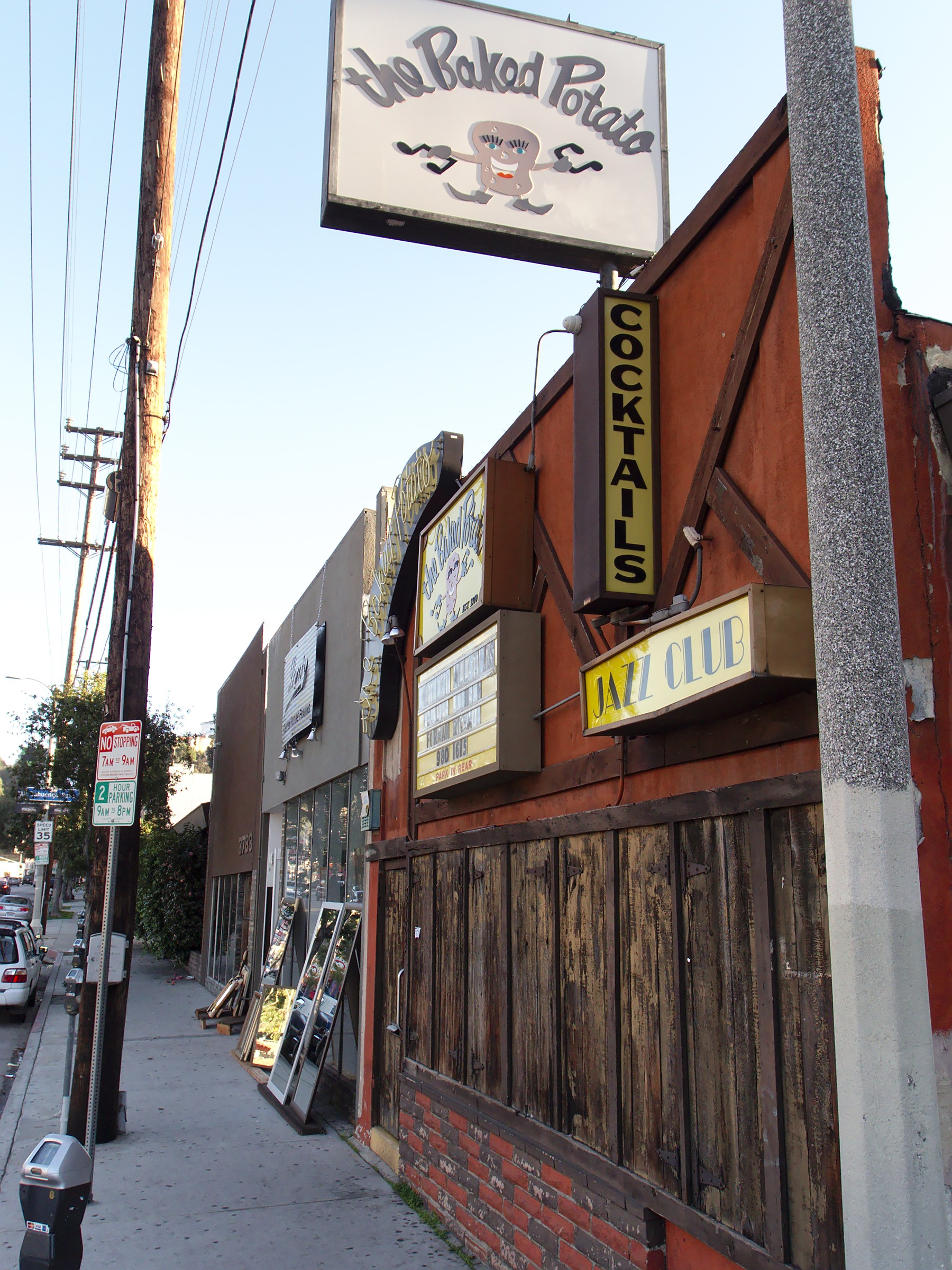
- Club exterior in 2015
- Interactive map of The Baked Potato
- Address: 3787 Cahuenga Blvd. Studio City, California; United States
- Owner: Don Randi

Construction
- Opened: 1970; 56 years ago

The Baked Potato is a prominent jazz club on Cahuenga Boulevard in Studio City, Los Angeles, California, opened by Don Randi (father of bassist Leah Randi) in 1970. It is the oldest continuously operating jazz room in Los Angeles.

== History ==
Don Randi opened The Baked Potato in 1970. He formed his own group, Don Randi and Quest, as the house band. Over the years, it has hosted many live recordings from jazz-fusion artists. Larry Carlton recorded Last Nite there in 1986. In 2010 The Baked Potato was named the Best Jazz Club in Los Angeles by Los Angeles magazine. They have cited it as a "mainstay for session players since 1975".

== Menu ==
The Baked Potato offers 24 variations on the plain baked potato such as the Philly cheesesteak potato, pepperoni pizza potato, barbecue chicken potato, maple ham and cheese potato, egg and sauteed spinach potato, and teriyaki chicken potato.

== In media ==
- Nick Menza of Megadeth collapsed and died while playing at the club with his band OHM on May 21, 2016.
- The club is mentioned in the 2016 musical film La La Land.
