= Last Nite (Larry Carlton album) =

Live album by Larry Carlton
- Released: February 17, 1986
- Recorded: Baked Potato (North Hollywood, CA)
- Studio: Room 335 (Hollywood, CA)
- Genre: Jazz fusion
- Length: 43:54
- Label: MCA
- Producer: Larry Carlton

Professional ratings
Review scores
Source	Rating
Allmusic	4/5 stars

Last Nite is a live album by Larry Carlton, released in 1986. Recorded at the Baked Potato in North Hollywood, California, Carlton is supported by keyboardist Terry Trotter, bassist Abraham Laboriel, drummer John Robinson, and percussionist Alex Acuña.

Technical note: Carlton, who is known as "Mr. 335" because of his preference of the Gibson ES-335 semi-hollow body guitar in his early career, used a custom-made Valley Arts Strat solid-body guitar with active EMG pick-ups for these recordings, which accounts for the distinctly different tone when compared to earlier Carlton recordings.

== Track listing ==
All tracks composed by Larry Carlton; except where indicated

1. "So What" (Miles Davis) - 7:57
2. "Don't Give It Up" - 5:32
3. "The B.P. Blues" - 7:53
4. "All Blues" (Miles Davis) - 8:18
5. "Last Nite" - 7:57
6. "Emotions Wound Us So" - 6:17

== Personnel ==
- Larry Carlton – guitars
- Terry Trotter – keyboards
- Abraham Laboriel – bass
- John Robinson – drums (1–3, 5, 6)
- Rick Marotta – drums (4)
- Alex Acuña – percussion
- Mark Russo – saxophones
- Gary Grant – trumpet
- Jerry Hey – trumpet, horn arrangements

=== Production ===
- Larry Carlton – producer, liner notes
- Rik Pekkonen – recording, engineer, mixing
- Bernie Grundman – mastering at Bernie Grundman Mastering (Hollywood, California)
- Jeff Adamoff – art direction
- Dick Bouchard – design, Illustration
- Jeff Lancaster – design, Illustration
- Robert Matheu – photography
- Charlie Rico – management
