= The Beautiful Girl (1969 film) =

Lithuanian film

- Directed by: Arūnas Žebriūnas
- Starring: Inga Mickytė; Lilija Žadeikytė
- Music by: Vyacheslav Ganelin
- Release date: December 27, 1969
- Running time: 71 minutes
- Country: Lithuania (Soviet Union)
- Languages: Lithuanian, Russian

The Beautiful Girl (Lithuanian: Gražuolė) is a 1969 (Soviet) Lithuanian film directed by Arūnas Žebriūnas.

== Plot ==
Nine-year-old Inga is the kindest and most radiant girl in her neighborhood, always chosen as the "beauty" during games with her friends. Her dream is to find a rare wild rosemary flower (Rhododendron tomentosum), a symbol of the magical world she cherishes. However, the arrival of a new boy in the yard forces Inga and her friends to confront reality for the first time. The strict realist boy dismisses their playful fantasies and mocks their choice of Inga as the "beauty," calling her nothing more than a "freckled scarecrow." He cannot understand her longing for the rosemary, a flower she imagines might bloom with violets. The boy's harshness shakes Inga's confidence, disrupting the joyful world she once knew.

Victor, Inga’s loyal friend, notices her distress and makes a heartfelt attempt to help. He sacrifices his most treasured possession—his grandfather’s sapper scissors—in exchange for the new boy revealing where the rosemary might be found. Victor also arranges for Inga to visit a hairdresser, believing it will help her feel beautiful, like the elegant women he has seen leaving the salon. But these gestures fail to console her. Inga, faced with her first true disappointment, begins to see the world differently. She notices her mother’s quiet sadness and realizes, for the first time, that her mother needs comfort too. Yet, as a little girl, Inga knows only one way to bring joy to others—the one taken from her: she begins to play make-believe with her mother, creating a shared world of fantasy that helps them both cope with their struggles.

== Cast ==
- Inga Mickytė - Inga
- Lilija Žadeikytė - Inga's Mother
- Sergey Martinson - Lonely Old Man
- Arvydas Samukas - Viktoras
- Tauras Ragalevičius - The New One
