= Vilnius Jazz Festival =

Festival in Vilnius, Lithuania

The Vilnius Jazz Festival is a jazz festival held in Vilnius, Lithuania. The festival runs over 3–4 days, and includes concerts, workshops and jazz sessions. It attracts around 5000 people each year. Many notable groups and musicians have performed at the festival, including The Zawinul Syndicate, Steve Lacy, Viacheslav Ganelin, Otomo Yoshihide, Defunkt, The Cinematic Orchestra, Iva Bittova, Willem Breuker Kollektief, Kazutoki Umezu, and the Marc Ducret Trio. The 37th festival was held in 2024.

== History ==
The festival was founded in 1987. Since then it has earned a reputation as "a radical avant-garde festival oriented towards novelty and limit-stretching creativity". The festival runs over 3–4 days, and includes concerts, workshops and jazz sessions. It has been organised since the beginning by Antanas Gustys. Around 5000 people attend each year. The festival joined the Europe Jazz Network in 2005.

Notable past participants in the festival include The Zawinul Syndicate, Steve Lacy, Leroy Jenkins, Viacheslav Ganelin, Otomo Yoshihide, Fred Frith, Defunkt, Django Bates, The Cinematic Orchestra, Iva Bittova, Myra Melford Quartet, Willem Breuker Kollektief, Kazutoki Umezu, and the Marc Ducret Trio.

The festival collaborates with institutions internationally, such as the Goethe Institut, the British Council, Swedish Institute, Pro Helvetia, and Japan Foundation.

In 2018, the festival was held for the 31st time; the programme included: Nate Wooley’s Knknighgh Quartet, Shai Maestro Trio, Sofia Jernberg, Vincent Courtois, Brian Marsella Trio, Ping Machine, Reinless and Paweł Brodowski. A 2023 reviewer for Jazzwise described the festival as hosting avant garde jazz and wrote that it was "a showcase unafraid to keep pushing into the future". The 2024 festival was the 37th event.
