= Sleepwalk (album) =

Studio album by Larry Carlton
- Released: January 6, 1982
- Recorded: 1981
- Studios: Room 335 (Hollywood); Strings recorded at Capitol Studio A (Hollywood)
- Genre: Jazz fusion
- Length: 40:14
- Label: Warner Bros.
- Producer: Larry Carlton

Larry Carlton chronology
Strikes Twice (1980)	Sleepwalk (1982)	Friends (1983)

Sleepwalk is the fifth studio album by jazz guitarist Larry Carlton, released on January 6, 1982.

== Track listing ==
All tracks are written by Larry Carlton, except where noted.

Side one
No.	Title	Length
1.	"Last Nite"	5:20
2.	"Blues Bird"	4:30
3.	"Song for Katie"	3:47
4.	"Frenchman's Flat"	4:32

Side two
No.	Title	Writer(s)	Length
5.	"Sleepwalk"	Santo Farina, John Farina, Ann Farina	4:34
6.	"Upper Kern"		7:30
7.	"10:00 P.M."		5:07
8.	"You Gotta Get It While You Can"		4:54
Total length:			40:14

Professional ratings
Review scores
Source	Rating
Allmusic	3/5 stars

== Personnel ==
Adapted from the album's liner notes.

=== Musicians ===
- Larry Carlton – guitar, arrangements (5)
- Carlos Rios – rhythm guitar (1)
- Terry Trotter – Fender Rhodes (1–3, 5–7)
- Brian Mann – Prophet (2–4, 8), Mini Moog (8)
- Don Freeman – Wurlitzer (2), Fender Rhodes (5), arrangements (5)
- Greg Mathieson – Fender Rhodes (4, 8), organ (6), Prophet (8), acoustic piano (8)
- Abe Laboriel – bass (1–3, 6–8)
- Steve Gadd – drums (1, 8)
- Jeff Porcaro – drums (2–4, 6, 7)
- John Ferraro – drums (5)
- Paulinho da Costa – percussion (1, 6, 8)
- David Sanborn – saxophone (6)
- Assa Drori – concertmaster

=== Technical ===
- Produced, engineered, and mixed by Larry Carlton
- Assistant engineers – Steve Carlton and Jim Hodson
- Strings engineered by Al Schmitt
- Strings arranged and conducted by Larry Carlton
- Mastered by Mike Reese at The Mastering Lab (Hollywood, CA)
- Art direction and design – Simon Levy
- Photography – Bob Seidemann
- Management – Charlie Lico
