= Sleepwalking (disambiguation) =

Sleepwalking is a sleep disorder.

Sleepwalking may also refer to:

== Albums ==
- Sleepwalking (Gerry Rafferty album) or the title song, 1982
- Sleepwalking (Magnum album) or the title song, 1992
- Sleepwalking (Memphis May Fire album) or the title song, 2009
- Sleepwalking (Rae & Christian album), 2001
- Sleepwalking (EP) or the title song, by Ammonia, 1995
- Sleepwalking, by Jonathan Bree, 2018

== Songs ==
- "Sleepwalking" (Bring Me the Horizon song), 2013
- "Sleepwalking" (The Chain Gang of 1974 song), 2014
- "Sleepwalking" (Maria Lawson song), 2006
- "Sleepwalking", by the Automatic from This Is a Fix, 2008
- "Sleepwalking", by Lily Allen from West End Girl, 2025
- "Sleepwalking", by Lissie from Back to Forever, 2013
- "Sleepwalking (Couples Only Dance Prom Night)", by Modest Mouse from Interstate 8, 1996
- "Sleep Walkin", by Mozzy from 1 Up Top Ahk, 2017

== Other uses ==
- Sleepwalking (film), a 2008 American drama
- Sleepwalking (Shameless), an episode of the American TV series Shameless
- Atmel SleepWalking, a form of autonomous peripheral operation in Atmel/Microchip microcontrollers

== See also ==
- Sleepwalk (disambiguation)
- Sleepwalker (disambiguation)
