= Strikes Twice =

Studio album by Larry Carlton
- Released: August 22, 1980
- Recorded: 1980
- Studio: Room 335 (Hollywood)
- Genres: Jazz fusion; rock
- Length: 40:50
- Label: Warner Bros.
- Producer: Larry Carlton

Larry Carlton chronology
Larry Carlton (1978)	Strikes Twice (1980)	Sleepwalk (1982)

Strikes Twice is the fourth studio album by jazz guitarist Larry Carlton, released in August 1980.

Professional ratings
Review scores
Source	Rating
Allmusic	3/5 stars

== Track listing ==
All tracks are written by Larry Carlton, except where noted.

Side one
No.	Title	Writer(s)	Length
1.	"Strikes Twice"		5:18
2.	"Ain't Nothin' for a Heartache"	Kerry Chater, Baron Longfellow	3:16
3.	"Midnight Parade"		5:06
4.	"The Magician"		4:11

Side two
No.	Title	Writer(s)	Length
5.	"Springville"		6:36
6.	"Mulberry Street"		7:15
7.	"In My Blood"	Carlton, John Townsend	4:09
8.	"For Love Alone"		4:59
Total length:			40:50

== Personnel ==
Adapted from the album's liner notes.

- Larry Carlton – guitar, guitar synthesizer (2, 3, 6), vocals (2, 4, 7), Fender Rhodes (8), bass (8), drums (8), percussion (8)
- Greg Mathieson – Fender Rhodes (1–3), Oberheim (4), CS-80 (4, 5), organ (5–7), Mini Moog (7)
- Don Freeman – CP-70 electric grand (1), Fender Rhodes (4, 5, 7), clavinet (2–4, 7)
- Brian Mann – CS-80 solo (1), Oberheim (1, 8)
- Terry Trotter – electric piano (6)
- Pops Popwell – bass (1–7)
- John Ferraro – drums (2–7)
- Paulinho da Costa – percussion (1–6)

=== Technical ===
- Produced and arranged by Larry Carlton
- Engineer – Larry Carlton
- Second engineer – Steve Carlton
- Remix – Larry Carlton
- Remix consultant – Jay Graydon
- Mastered by Bernie Grundman at A&M Studios (Hollywood, California)
- Art direction – Janet Cejka
- Graphic designer – Cherry Wood
- Photography – Bob Seidemann
- Lightning photo – Lief Ericksenn
- Career direction – Larson & Recor Associates
