= On Solid Ground =

Studio album by Larry Carlton
- Released: 1989
- Studio: Room 335 and Rock This House (Hollywood, California); Location Recording Service (Burbank, California)
- Genre: Jazz fusion
- Length: 53:47
- Label: MCA
- Producer: Larry Carlton

On Solid Ground is an album by the American musician Larry Carlton, released in 1989. The album features keyboardists Terry Trotter and Alan Pasqua, and saxophonist Kirk Whalum. Carlton was shot in the neck while working on the album, delaying its release. Carlton supported the album with a North American tour.

== Production ==
Carlton played on the original recording of Steely Dan's "Josie", although not the guitar solo.

== Critical reception ==
Professional ratings
Review scores
Source	Rating
AllMusic	3/5 stars
Los Angeles Times	3.5/5 stars

The Los Angeles Times wrote that Carlton plays "with his trademark shiny, thick sound and relaxed jazz/blues/rock feel." The Philadelphia Daily News noted the "graceful, stately melody and by the purity of guitarist Carlton's playing" on the title track.

== Track listing ==
All songs written by Larry Carlton, except where noted.

1. "Josie" (Walter Becker, Donald Fagen) - 5:08
2. "All in Good Time" - 8:39
3. "The Philosopher" - 4:06
4. "Layla" (Eric Clapton, Jim Gordon) - 4:06
5. "On Solid Ground" - 4:19
6. "The Wãffer" - 6:36
7. "Bubble Shuffle" - 4:32
8. "Chapter II" - 4:48
9. "Honey Samba" - 5:06
10. "Sea Space" - 6:27

== Personnel ==
- Larry Carlton – guitar, keyboards (3, 4), bass (8, 9)
- Terry Trotter – keyboards (1–4, 6, 7, 9, 10)
- Eric Persing – programming (1)
- Willy LeMaster – sequencer programming (1)
- Alan Pasqua – keyboards (2, 6–8, 10), keyboard programming (2, 7), programming (3, 6, 10)
- Rhett Lawrence – programming (3, 10), keyboards (5), keyboard programming (5), drum programming (5)
- Brad Cole – programming (4)
- David Foster – keyboards (5)
- Brian Mann – keyboards (9)
- Dean Parks – rhythm guitar (2, 3, 7)
- Abraham Laboriel – bass (1)
- Nathan East – bass (2)
- John Peña – bass (3, 4, 6, 7, 10)
- John Robinson – drums (1–8, 10)
- Rick Marotta – drums (9)
- Paulinho da Costa – percussion (1)
- Michael Fisher – percussion (2–4, 6, 7, 9, 10)
- Kirk Whalum – saxophone (1, 3–6, 8)

Production

- Larry Carlton – producer, arrangements, interlude arrangement (3)
- Rick Logan – interlude arrangement (3)
- Rik Pekkonen – recording, mixing (1–3, 6–10)
- Hal Sacks – recording (4, 5), remixing (4, 5)
- Michael Verdick – remixing (4, 5)
- Rhett Lawrence – keyboard overdub recording
- Bernie Grundman – mastering at Bernie Grundman Mastering (Hollywood, California)
- Kathleen Covert – art direction, design
- Timothy White – photography
