= Alone / But Never Alone =

Studio album by Larry Carlton
- Released: 1986
- Studio: Room 335 (Hollywood, California)
- Genre: Smooth jazz
- Length: 39:24
- Label: MCA
- Producer: Larry Carlton

Professional ratings
Review scores
Source	Rating
Allmusic	4/5 stars

Alone / But Never Alone is an album by Larry Carlton, released in 1986.

== Track listing ==
All tracks by Larry Carlton except where noted

1. "Smiles and Smiles to Go" – 5:47
2. "Perfect Peace" – 4:28
3. "Carrying You" – 4:00
4. "The Lord's Prayer" (Albert Malotte) – 5:09
5. "High Steppin'" – 5:44
6. "Whatever Happens" (Larry Carlton, Bill Withers) – 4:27
7. "Pure Delight" – 5:33
8. "Alone/But Never Alone" – 3:37

== Personnel ==
- Larry Carlton – acoustic guitar, additional keyboards (1, 5), keyboards (2, 3, 6), bass (2, 3, 6), electric guitar (9)
- Terry Trotter – Yamaha DX7 (1), keyboards (5, 8)
- Abraham Laboriel – bass (1, 5, 7)
- Rick Marotta – drums (1–3, 5–7)
- Michael Fisher – percussion (1–3, 5–7)

=== Production ===
- Larry Carlton – producer, arrangements
- Rik Pekkonen – recording, mixing
- Hal Sacks – assistant engineer
- Bernie Grundman – mastering at Bernie Grundman Mastering (Hollywood, California)
- Simon Levy – art direction
- Thomas Ryan – design
- Jim "Señior" McGuire – photography
- Charlie Lico – management

== Chart performance ==
Year	Chart	Position
1986	US Billboard Jazz Albums	1
1986	US Billboard 200	141
