= Julia Kadel =

German jazz pianist and composer (born 1986)

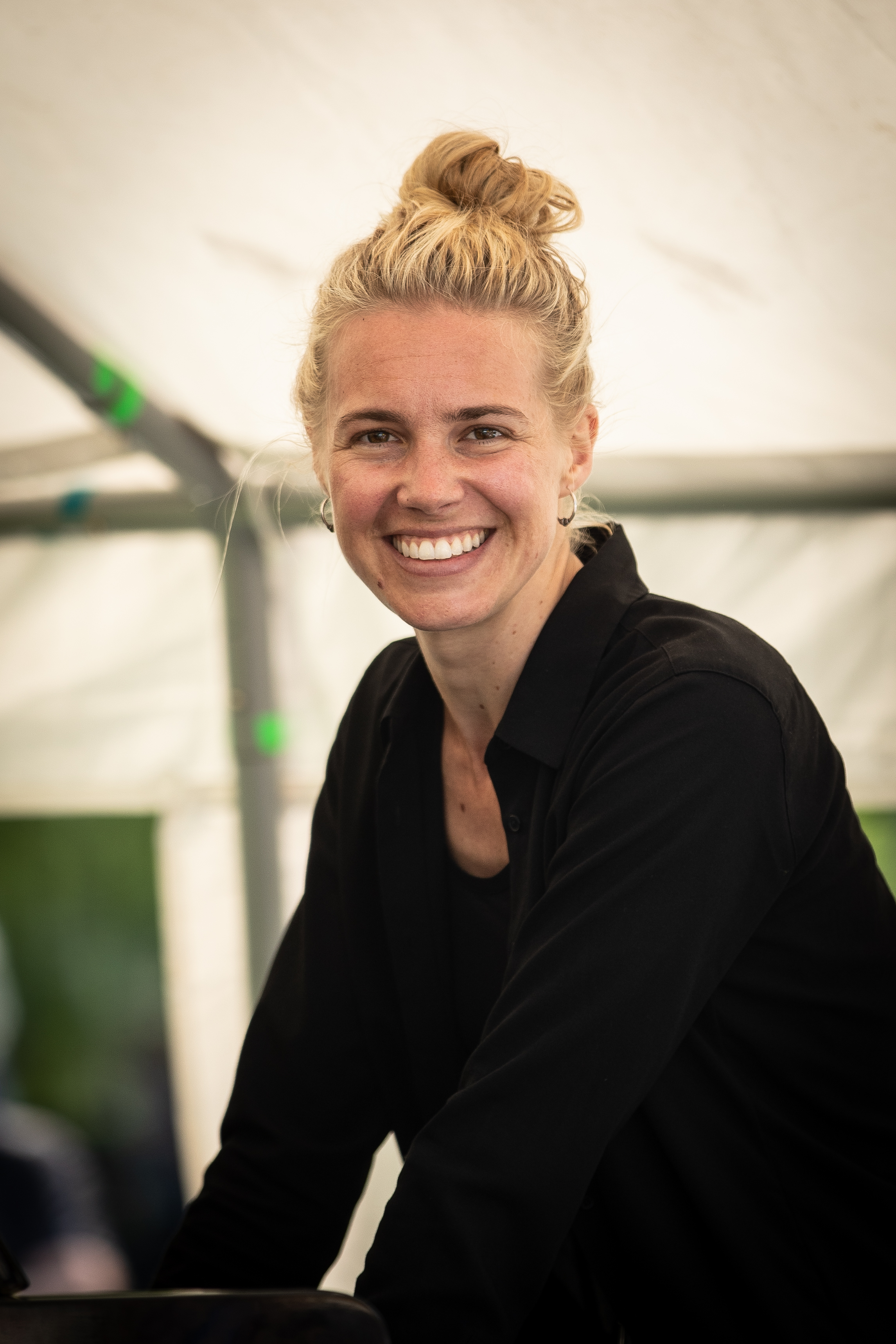
- Kadel at the Moers Festival 2018

Background information
- Born: 1986 (age 39–40); Berlin-Kreuzberg, West Berlin, West Germany
- Genres: Jazz
- Instrument: Piano
- Website: http://juliakadel.com/

Julia Kadel (born 1986 in Berlin-Kreuzberg) is a German jazz pianist and composer.

== Biography ==
Kadel began playing piano at the age of seven. She started out on classical piano and took up jazz at the age of fifteen. She studied psychology at Humboldt University of Berlin, then went on to study jazz piano at the Hochschule für Musik Carl Maria von Weber in Dresden from 2009 to 2014.

She led a trio with the German-Norwegian bassist Karl-Erik Enkelmann and Dresden drummer Steffen Roth. In 2014, their debut album Im Vertrauen was released by Blue Note Records/Universal. It was presented at the Überjazz Festival in Hamburg, and was awarded the first jazz prize from Hochschule für Musik Saar in 2013.

== Discography ==
- 2014: Im Vertrauen (Blue Note), with Julia Kadel Trio (Karl-Erik Enkelmann and Steffen Roth)
- 2016: Über und Unter (Blue Note) with Julia Kadel Trio (Karl-Erik Enkelmann and Steffen Roth)
- 2019: Kaskaden (MPS), with Julia Kadel Trio (Karl-Erik Enkelmann and Steffen Roth)
- 2023: Powerful Vulnerability (MPS), with Julia Kadel Trio (Athina Kontou and Devin Gray)
