= Romano Ricciardi =

Romano Ricciardi (born 1986) is an Italian/Swiss Jazz-Saxophonist.

Born in Zürich, Switzerland in 1986. Romano developed an early interest in music listening to old jazz musicians like Charlie Parker, Sonny Stitt, Cannonball Adderley, Lou Donaldson, Sonny Rollins, Hank Mobley, Dexter Gordon, John Coltrane and many others.

He began to play the saxophone at age 10 autodidactically. At the age of 12 he played in a funk/blues band with his older brother Alessandro who is a pianist. They won the second prize at a newcomer contest. By the time he was 14 he performed with local jazz ensembles in different jazz clubs. In 2004 he moved to Bern, where he studied for one year with George Robert and for another with Andy Scherrer at the Swiss Jazz School. At this time he used to play in a quartet with his brother Alessandro on piano, Thomas Dürst on bass and Ueli Müller on drums and he took part in several jazz projects.

In 2006 he went for an exchange to Sicily, Italy, to get to know better his second native country. Back to Switzerland he moved back to Zürich, where he continued his studies at the Jazz School Bern and Zürich.

In February 2008 he released his first album entitled "Remembering Bird - A Tribute to Charlie Parker", which he recorded at the Radio DRS Studio 2 with the great bassist Giorgos Antoniou, Alessandro Ricciardi and two musicians from the UK: Steve Brown (drummer Scott Hamilton quartet) and Steve Fishwick (trumpet – played with Anita ‘O Day, Cedar Walton etc.).

Romano played in several Jazzclubs, like Moods Zürich, Mehrspur, "Isebähndli" Baden, Jazzclub Thalwil, Chorus Lausanne, Jazzkantine Luzern, Jazznojazz festival and performed with the Swiss All-Star-Big-Band 2009 (Guillermo Klein). In 2010 he got his master's degree in arts of music and pedagogy.

In 2006 Romano Ricciardi and his brother Alessandro founded LiveJazz.Ch.

== Sources ==
- http://www.romanoricciardi.com
- http://www.livejazz.ch
