= Ancora da Capo =

Live album by The Ganelin Trio
- Released: 1982
- Recorded: November 15, 1980
- Venue: Leningrad, Russia; West Berlin, Germany
- Genre: Free jazz
- Length: 77:36
- Label: Leo
- Producer: Leo Feigin

Vyacheslav Ganelin chronology
Con Anima (1978)	Ancora da Capo (1982)	Con Amore (1982)

Ancora da Capo is a live album by the Ganelin Trio led by pianist Vyacheslav Ganelin with Vladamir Tarasov and Vladimir Chekasin which was recorded in Leningrad in 1980 and released by Leo in 1982. The LP release was followed by a second volume. The 1997 CD release combined the first volume with a live recording from October 29, 1980, in West Berlin.

== Reception ==
Professional ratings
Review scores
Source	Rating
Penguin Guide to Jazz	👑
Allmusic	4.5/5 stars

The Penguin Guide to Jazz made the album part of their "Core Collection" of essential jazz albums and awarded the compilation a "Crown" signifying a recording that the authors "feel a special admiration or affection for".

The Allmusic review by William York said that the album was "a rare balance of form and freedom, wildness and restraint that makes it continually surprising (at times even jarringly so) as well as remarkably durable in terms of repeated listening".

At JazzTimes Duck Baker said, "the music stands up well. These men are playing for their lives, and have no time to worry about whether this or that transition might be difficult. As a result potential pitfalls vanish into thin air as they achieve a kind of mobility rare outside of Sun Ra and a freedom that must have been sweet indeed".

At Perfect Sound Forever Steve Kulak wrote, "Those lucky enough to be there would no doubt have witnessed first hand what was meant by "an insanely accelerated history of jazz." The music can be approached as one extended composition, or as a series of scenes, although it may seem odd to speak of scenes in a work where hearing and sound prevail. Yet hearing, together with vision, is the second sense that brings us knowledge from afar. And those who were there to see and hear the Trio were... astonished".

== Track listing ==
All compositions by Vyacheslav Ganelin

1. "Ancora da Capo Part 1" - 37:57
2. "Ancora da Capo Part 2" - 39:38

== Personnel ==
- Vyacheslav Ganelin – piano, basset horn, electric guitar, percussion
- Vladimir Chekasin – alto saxophone, tenor saxophone, basset horn, clarinet, wooden flute, violin, percussion, voice
- Vladimir Tarasov – drums, talking drum, bells, percussion
