= Discovery (Larry Carlton album) =

Studio album by Larry Carlton
- Released: 1987
- Studio: Room 335 (Hollywood, California)
- Genre: Smooth jazz, jazz fusion
- Length: 43:07
- Label: MCA
- Producer: Larry Carlton

Professional ratings
Review scores
Source	Rating
AllMusic	3/5 stars

Discovery is an album by Larry Carlton, released in 1987. It also features Kirk Whalum and his tenor saxophone solos on several tracks, with Terry Trotter on keyboards, John Peña on bass and Rick Marotta on drums. Carlton's instrumental cover of the Doobie Brothers' "Minute by Minute" won Best Pop Instrumental Performance at the 30th Annual Grammy Awards.

== Track listing ==
All songs written and arranged by Larry Carlton, except where noted.

1. "Hello Tomorrow" - 5:22
2. "Those Eyes" - 4:17
3. "Knock on Wood" (Steve Cropper, Eddie Floyd) - 6:21
4. "Discovery" - 5:22
5. "My Home Away from Home" - 4:53
6. "March of the Jazz Angels" - 5:14
7. "Minute by Minute" (Lester Abrams, Michael McDonald) - 4:58
8. "A Place for Skipper" - 4:45
9. "Her Favorite Song" - 1:55

== Personnel ==
- Larry Carlton – acoustic guitar (1–8), vocals (7), acoustic guitar solo (9), Roland GM-70 MIDI converter (9)
- Terry Trotter – keyboards (1–6, 8)
- David Garfield – synthesizer programming
- Marc Hugenberger – synthesizer programming
- Diego Schaff – synthesizer programming
- Michael McDonald – keyboards (7)
- John Peña – bass (1–8)
- Rick Marotta – drums (1–8)
- Michael Fisher – percussion (1–8)
- Kirk Whalum – saxophone solo (1, 3, 4, 7)
- Larry Williams – woodwinds (3, 7)
- Gary Grant – trumpet (3, 7)
- Jerry Hey – trumpet (3, 7), horn arrangements (3, 7)
- David Pack – vocals (7)
- Michele Pillar – vocals (7)

=== Production ===
- Larry Carlton – producer
- Rik Pekkonen – recording, mixing
- Joe Schift – assistant engineer
- Bernie Grundman – mastering at Bernie Grundman Mastering (Hollywood, California)
- Kathleen Covert – art direction, design
- Timothy White – photography
