= Theo Jackson (musician) =

English jazz songwriter, pianist and singer

Theo Jackson (born 4 January 1986) is an English jazz songwriter, pianist and singer. Jackson has released two albums, Jericho (2012), and Shoeless and the Girl (2015). Jackson has toured the UK, performing at such venues as Pizza Express Jazz Club in Soho and the 606 Club, performed in New Zealand and Germany, and is due to make his American debut in November 2015.

== Biography and career ==
Jackson was born in London and grew up predominantly in Thanet, Kent. He attended Chatham House Grammar School and subsequently Durham University where he read for a BA in Music. In January 2011 Jackson appeared at the 606 Club, London Jazz News wrote that he "leads his band from the piano, with a confidence and assurance that comes from being a true musician, and the trust and knowledge that the other guys on the stand are too" and his "...well-worked solos develop logically, being both thoughtfully-crafted and dexterously-impressive, and above all making sense, without resorting to flashy finger-wiggling". Jackson has also regularly performed at the Pizza Express Jazz Club in Soho.

Jackson independently released his debut album Jericho, in 2012. It was named for the suburb of Oxford where he was living at that time. Jericho was positively reviewed by Bruce Lindsay in All About Jazz who described it as "a welcome creation...the work of a young male vocalist who is steering a route that avoids the well-trodden paths of The Great American Songbook and heads towards a potentially fascinating musical destination".

Later in 2012 Jackson was invited to be a headline act at Manawatu International Jazz & Blues Festival in New Zealand. He performed a solo show and opened the headlining show featuring the jazz saxophonist and composer Bob Mintzer. Whilst in New Zealand Jackson was invited to play live on the morning television show Good Morning on TV One and also gave masterclasses for students at the New Zealand School of Music and Massey University.

In 2013 Jackson's inaugural UK tour saw him appear at numerous notable venues including the Cheltenham Jazz Festival and The Stables. Later in 2013 Jackson was invited to appear twice as part of the London Jazz Festival and also appeared live on BBC Radio London with Simon Lederman. He set a lyric to Scott LaFaro's composition "Gloria's Step", which was published by Concord Music Group.

2014 saw Jackson appear at the Love Supreme Jazz Festival, Cadogan Hall and The Late Night Jazz Series at the Royal Albert Hall. Later in the same year it was announced that Jackson had signed to the American record label Dot Time Records.

In April 2015 Jackson released his second album, Shoeless and the Girl, on Dot Time Records with a launch show at St James Theatre in London. The album featured eight compositions by Jackson alongside two lyrical adaptations of original compositions by saxophonist Wayne Shorter. Reviewing Shoeless and the Girl for All About Jazz, Bruce Lindsay wrote that "Jackson's voice has matured since his debut, gaining resonance and lower-register strength. He's developing into a superb singer, a stylist whose voice communicates with a welcome clarity" and the album was "...an old-fashioned kind of record. That's "old-fashioned" as in melodic, swinging, understated, lyrically engaging—old-fashioned in a really good way."

In May 2015 Jackson was featured at Jazz Ahead in Bremen, Germany, in his European debut. Jackson is due to make his American debut at the John F. Kennedy Center for the Performing Arts in November 2015.
