= Larry Carlton (album) =

Studio album by Larry Carlton
- Released: July 31, 1978
- Studios: Room 335 (Hollywood); Strings recorded at Western Recorders (Hollywood)
- Genres: Jazz-funk; jazz fusion
- Length: 41:13
- Label: Warner Bros.
- Producer: Larry Carlton

Larry Carlton chronology
Singing/Playing (1973)	Larry Carlton (1978)	Strikes Twice (1980)

Professional ratings
Review scores
Source	Rating
AllMusic	4/5 stars

Larry Carlton is an album released by jazz guitarist Larry Carlton on July 31, 1978. It was recorded at his studio, Room 335, in Hollywood, California.

== Track listing ==
All tracks are written by Larry Carlton, except where noted.

Side one
No.	Title	Writer(s)	Length
1.	"Room 335"		5:38
2.	"Where Did You Come From"	William Smith, Eric Mercury	3:27
3.	"Nite Crawler"		5:20
4.	"Point It Up"		4:56

Side two
No.	Title	Writer(s)	Length
5.	"Rio Samba"		6:55
6.	"I Apologize"	Smith, Mercury	4:20
7.	"Don't Give It Up"		6:04
8.	"(It Was) Only Yesterday"		4:33
Total length:			41:14

== Personnel ==
- Larry Carlton – guitars, lead vocals (2, 6), arrangements
- Greg Mathieson – keyboards
- Abraham Laboriel – bass
- Jeff Porcaro – drums
- Paulinho da Costa – percussion
- Gerald Vinci – concertmaster
- William "Smitty" Smith – background vocals, vocal arrangements

=== Technical ===
- Produced and engineered by Larry Carlton
- Strings engineered by Paul Dobbe
- Second engineer – Steve Carlton
- Art direction – John Cabalka
- Design – Brad Kanawyer and John Lumkin
- Artwork – John Lumkin
- Back cover photography – John Gilbert Gonzalez
