= Sleepwalker (Štyrský) =

1925 painting by Jindřich Štyrský

- Картината „Сомнамбулът“ (Bulgarian)
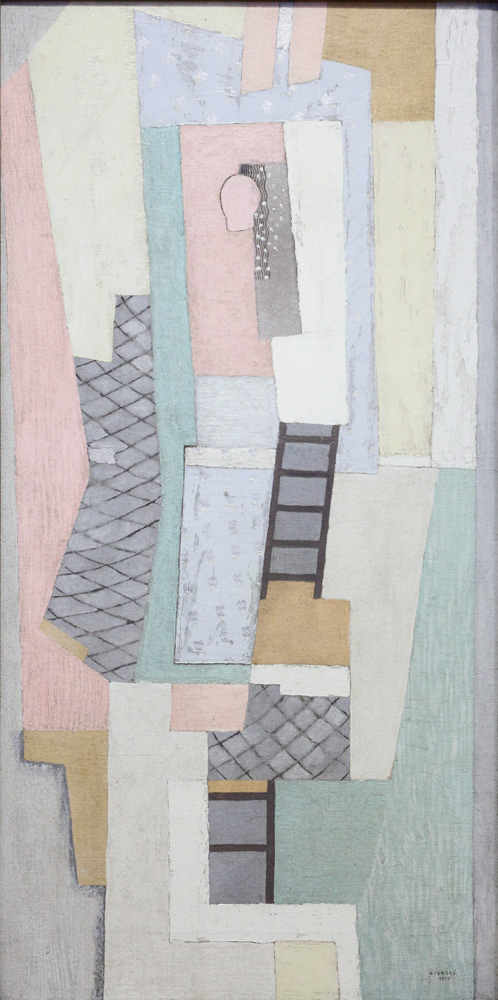
- Artist: Jindřich Štyrský
- Year: 1925
- Medium: oil on canvas
- Dimensions: 60.3 cm × 30.8 cm (23.7 in × 12.1 in)

Sleepwalker, "Somnambulist" (in Czech: Náměsíčná) is a painting from 1925 by Czech surrealist Jindřich Štyrský.

== Description ==
It is painted in oil on canvas and its dimensions are 60.3 x 30.8 centimeters. In 1965 the canvas was purchased by the Moravian Gallery in Brno.

== Analysis ==
In terms of style painting refers to the style of artificialism, developed by Shtirski in this period of his career.
