= Hanne Kalleberg =

Norwegian jazz singer and composer (born 1987)

- Born: 1987 (age 38–39); Flekkefjord, Vest-Agder
- Origin: Norway
- Genres: Jazz
- Occupations: Musician, composer
- Instrument: Vocals
- Website: hannekalleberg.no

Hanne Kalleberg (born 1987) is a Norwegian jazz singer and composer.

== Career ==
Kalleberg was born in Flekkefjord Municipality, and is a graduate of the Norwegian Academy of Music in Oslo. She released her debut album Papirfly (2013), within her own quartet 'Papirfly' (former name Hanne Kalleberg Kvartett). Here she collaborates with Philip Birkenes, Jakop Janssønn and Knut Olav Buverud Sandvik. She is also in the project 'Grønske', constituted by additional Ragnhild Briseid, Kjersti Støylen and Elisabeth Wulfsberg. They play self composed music for children, and has a show called "Climatus – Isbjørnen som vil redde jordkloden" (Climatus – The polar bear wants to save the planet earth) about climate and the environment.

== Discography ==
Within her own quartet Papirfly

- 2013: Papirfly (NorCD)
