= Vyacheslav Ganelin =

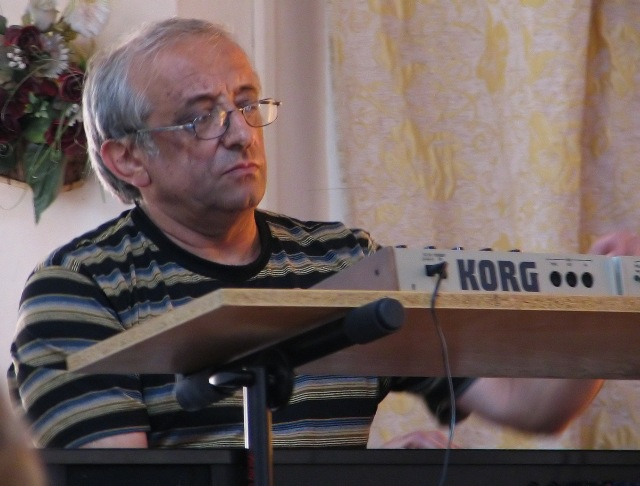
- Vyacheslav Ganelin (2008)

Background information
- Born: 17 December 1944 (age 81); Kraskovo, Russian SFSR, Soviet Union
- Genres: Free jazz, classical music
- Occupations: Musician, bandleader, composer, pedagogue
- Instruments: Piano, synthesizer
- Years active: 1961–present
- Website: ganelintrio.com

Vyacheslav (Slava) Ganelin (Hebrew: ויאצ'סלב (סלבה) גנלין, Lithuanian: Viačeslavas Ganelinas, Russian: Вячеслав Шевелевич Гане́лин; born 17 December 1944) is a Lithuanian–Israeli jazz pianist, composer, and pedagogue.

Primarily a pianist, he also plays other keyboards (organ and synthesizer) as well as bass, guitar, and percussions. He was the leader of the Ganelin Trio, described by critic Chris Kelsey as "arguably the world's greatest free jazz ensemble" of the 1970s and '80s. He was a founder of Lithuanian jazz (Soviet jazz, when Lithuania was controlled by the Soviet Union).

== Early career ==
Ganelin was born in Kraskovo, near Moscow. In 1948 his family moved to Lithuania, where he learned to play piano in the music school. Later he studied piano and composition at the Vilnius Conservatory where he graduated in 1968. He debuted as jazz pianist in a 1961 concert, during the Khrushchev Thaw.

For many years, Ganelin taught composition at the Vilnius Conservatory, and was music director of the Vilnius Russian Drama Theatre. He wrote music for many films, including The Beautiful Girl and the musical film Devil's Bride, and an opera, The Red-Haired Liar and the Soldier.

== Ganelin trio ==
In 1968, Ganelin formed a trio with percussionist Vladimir Tarasov and saxophonist Vladimir Rezitsky. Rezitsky left the trio in 1971, and was replaced with Vladimir Chekasin. The trio, called Ganelin Trio or GTCh, combined free jazz with elements of folk and classic music. It achieved critical acclaim in Soviet Union and abroad.

The trio performed at the Warsaw Jazz Jamboree in 1976. The same year, its first album, Con anima, was released. The 1980 performance at the Berlin Jazz Festival was described by Joachim-Ernst Berendt as "the wildest and yet the best organized and most professional free jazz I've heard in years". In 1984, the trio toured in the UK, and in 1986, in the US. The trio released more than 20 discs; it broke up in 1987, making a reunion tour in 2001.

Considered as the founders of Lithuanian Jazz School the trio received Lithuanian National Prize in 2016.

== Israel ==
In 1987, Ganelin immigrated to Israel, where he became a lecturer at the Jerusalem Academy of Music and Dance. In 1999 he founded the Ganelin Trio Priority with soprano saxophonist Petras Vyšniauskas and percussionist Klaus Kugel, which is still active. Ganelin also performs solo, as well as with various artists including the drummer Arkadiy Gotesman, the singer and dancer Esti Kenan-Ofri, the oud player Gershon Weiserfirer, and the classical pianist Irina Berkovich.

He directs the festival Jazz Globus in Jerusalem. He also continues to write music for movies and theatre. In particular, he wrote the music for the movies The Distance and Foreign Sister by Dan Wolman, and for the plays Beautiful Girl of the Yiddishpiel Theatre and The Naked King of the Lookingglass Theatre.

== Selected recordings ==
=== Solo ===
- Con amore (Leo, 1987)
- On Stage ... Backstage (Rec. live in Germany 1992; Leo, 1994)

=== Duos ===
- as Slava Ganelin, with Esti Kenan-Ofri: On the Edge of a Dream (Rec. live in Germany 1992, and Israel 1999; ZuTa, 1999)
- as Slava Ganelin, with Ned Rothenberg: Falling into Place (Rec. live in Israel 2004; Auris Media, 2006)

=== Ganelin Trio (Ganelin, Tarasov, Chekasin) ===
- Con anima (Melody, 1978)
- Live In East Germany (Leo, 1980)
- Concerto grosso (Melody, 1980)
- Non Troppo (Enja, 1983)
- Ancora da Capo (Leo, 1982)
- Non Troppo (Hat ART, 1985)
- 15 Year Reunion: Live at the Frankfurt Book Fair (Leo, 2003)

=== Ganelin Trio Priority ===
- Live in Germany (Rec. 1999; Auris Media, 2005)
- Live in Lugano 2006 (NotTwo (MW 783), 2007)
- Visions (Rec. live in New York 2007; SoLyD, 2010)
