= Jakop Janssønn Hauan =

Norwegian jazz musician (born 1986)

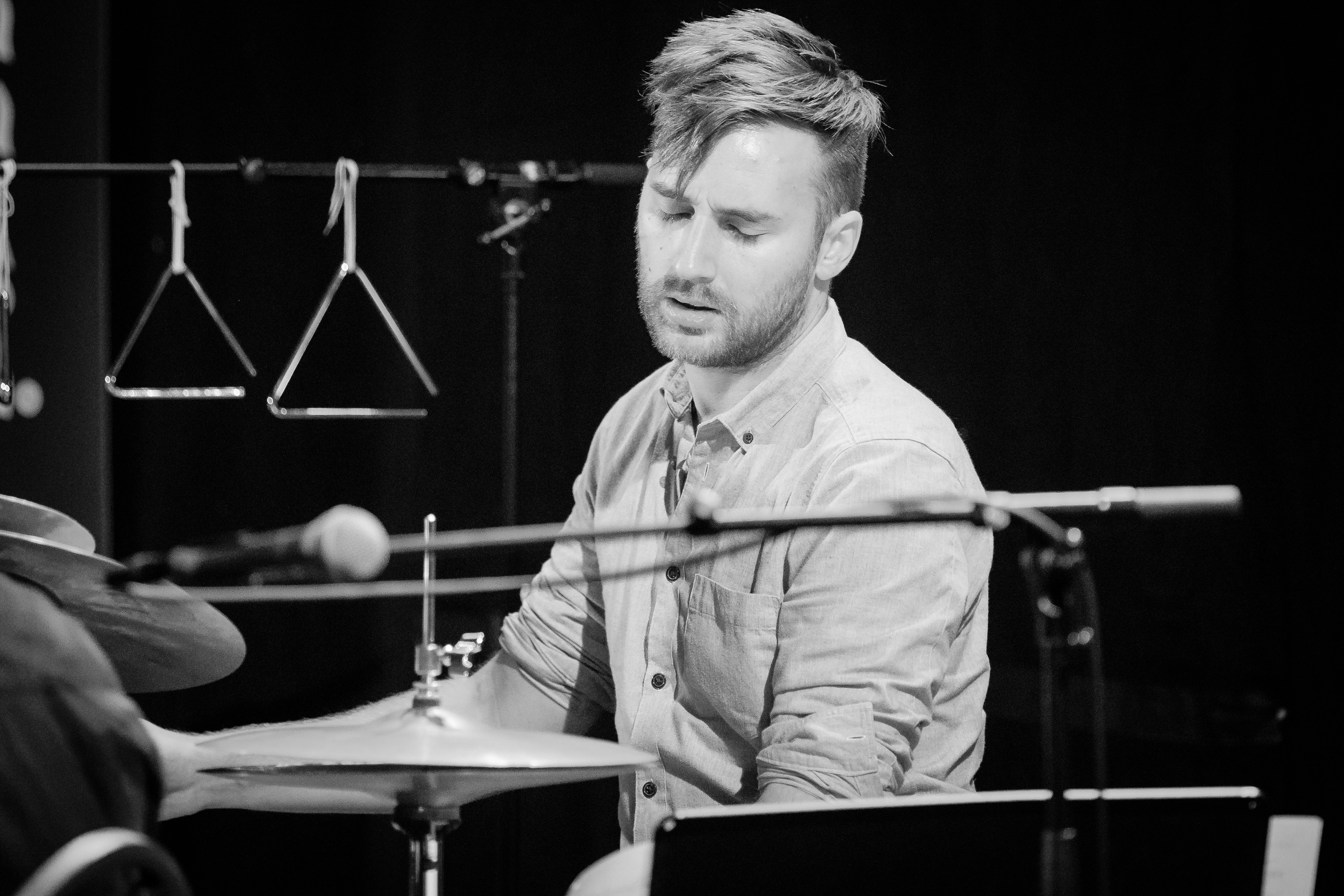
- At the 2018 Jazz på Jølst festival

Background information
- Born: Jakop Filip Janssønn Hauan; 11 July 1986 (age 39); Tromsø, Troms
- Origin: Norway
- Genres: Jazz
- Occupations: Musician, composer
- Instruments: Drums, electronics
- Website: jakopjanssonn.com

Jakop Filip Janssønn Hauan (born 11 July 1986 in Tromsø, Norway) is a Norwegian jazz musician (drums and electronics).

== Career ==
Hauan is a graduate of the Norwegian Academy of Music in Oslo (2011), holding a Bachelor's degree in executive drums and jazz improvisation. He has toured and played a series of concerts in Norway, Europe and Africa within bands like 'Halles Komet', 'Johan Lindvall Trio', 'Zarathustra', 'Northern Arc', 'IAmSound', 'Papirfly' (Hanne Kalleberg Kvartett) and has participated in the competitions Jazzintro within the bands Cinnamon Re:source and 'Hanne Kalleberg Kvartett' and gained second place in ”nõmme jazz international youth competition, Jazz artist 2010”.

Hauan collaborates within the duo AvantGong including Jørn Øien, where they want to create forms, melodies and coherence using synths, drums, electronics with free music and world music as a starting point. The result is musical ideas where the sound sources merges seamlessly into a free-improvised expression that groove and tonality varied through a stream of fascinating sound images. Inspired by the music and cultures from around the world, electronica music and noise, jazz and improvisational music, the duo seeks to create a distinctive sound.

Hauan is one of the initiators behind 'Lillesalen' concert series. The event which since the fall has taken place in 'Lillesalen' at Chateau Neuf, aims to be a stage for talented jazz musicians. According to the organizers, they are among the few that focuses exclusively on this group.

== Discography ==
With Morten Halle

- 2012: Northern Arc (Curling Legs)

Within the quartet Papirfly

- 2013: Papirfly (NorCD)
