= Terry Trotter =

American pianist (1940–2026)

- Born: October 5, 1940; Los Angeles, California, U.S.
- Died: August 4, 2026 (aged 85) Las Vegas, Nevada, U.S.
- Genres: Classical; jazz
- Occupation: Musician
- Instrument: Piano
- Years active: 1955–2019

Terry William Trotter (October 5, 1940 – August 4, 2026) was an American jazz pianist and teacher from Los Angeles. He recorded with such artists as Frank Sinatra, Ella Fitzgerald, Natalie Cole, Celine Dion, Larry Carlton, and many others. Trotter composed the theme music to the television show Everybody Loves Raymond.

== Life and career ==
Born in Los Angeles on October 5, 1940, Trotter was the youngest of two children born to Ralph K. Trotter and Phyllis Bader. (Note: His sister Linda Trotter performed as an opera singer in Europe for twenty-one years and later became chair of the vocal faculty at Western Michigan University.) At age four, he started studying piano, but by the time he was entering adolescence, Trotter's interest in music as a whole had all but vanished. At this time, Mrs. Trotter, herself a classical pianist, had an idea. "My mom found a piano teacher whose style was very Teddy Wilson / jazz-inspired. I fell in love with jazz. Then after studying it for a couple of years, I really fell in love with classical music, too." A few years later, when it came time to decide which area to focus on professionally, newly acquired acquaintance Leonid Hambro had some helpful advice. Said Trotter:

Leonid said, "You could probably get into the top 5 percent of classical pianists, but that's not going to be enough to survive. You really have to be in the top 1 or 2 percent to make it there. But as a jazz pianist you can do so much more. And you can still play classical music."
So that pretty much cinched it for me.

Between his classical training and his growing reputation as a quick study, Trotter had little trouble finding work, whether in the studio or on the road.

Trotter died on August 4, 2026, at the age of 85.
