= Larry Carlton =

American guitarist (born 1948)

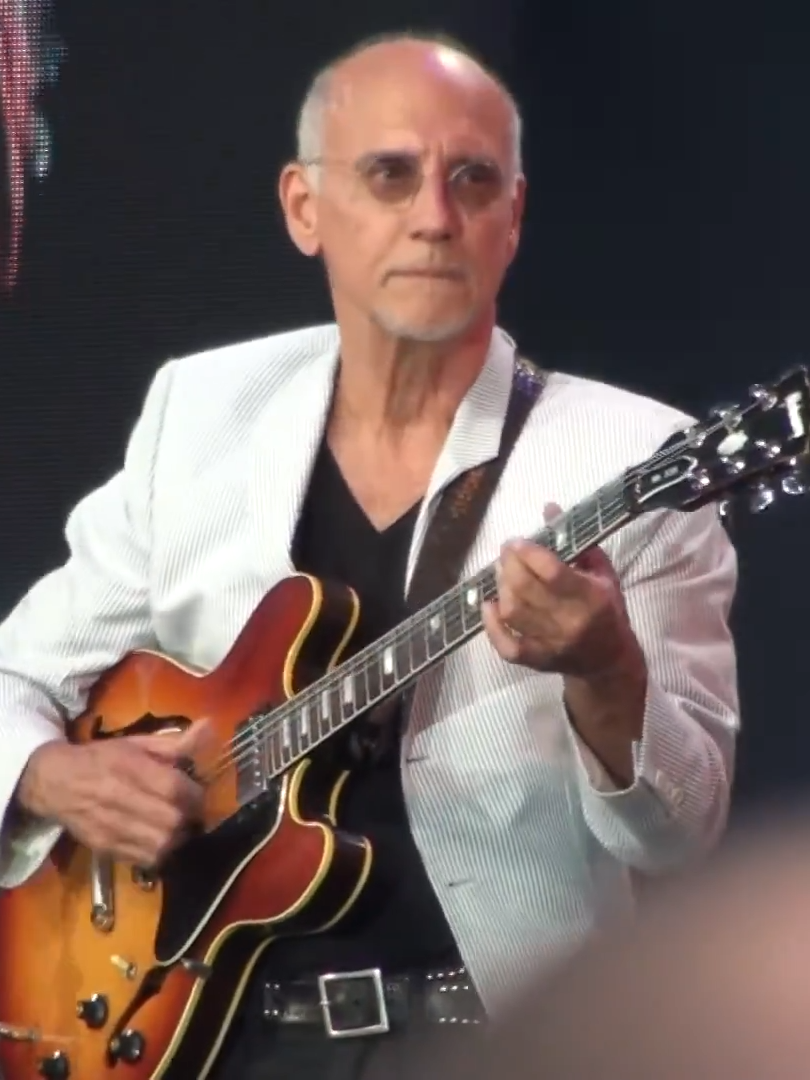
- Larry Carlton at Alfa Jazz Fest in Lviv, Ukraine, 2014

Background information
- Born: Larry Eugene Carlton; March 2, 1948 (age 78); Torrance, California, U.S.
- Genres: Jazz fusion; crossover jazz; smooth jazz; pop rock; pop
- Occupations: Musician; composer
- Instrument: Guitar
- Years active: 1962–present
- Labels: Warner Bros.; MCA; GRP; Favored Nations
- Website: larrycarlton335.com

Larry Eugene Carlton (born March 2, 1948) is an American guitarist who built his career as a studio musician in the 1970s and 1980s for acts including Steely Dan and Joni Mitchell. One of the most sought-after guitarists of his era, Carlton has participated in thousands of recording sessions, recorded on hundreds of albums in many genres including more than 100 gold records, in addition to music for television and movies. He was a member of the jazz fusion group the Crusaders and the smooth jazz band Fourplay maintaining a long solo career.

== Music career ==
=== Session work ===
Carlton was born in Torrance, California in the South Bay Area of L.A., and, at the age of six, began guitar lessons. In the early 1960s, while he was still in high school, he debuted his talent playing surf guitar with Eddie and the Showmen, who became the house band at the Retail Clerks Union Hall in Buena Park, California. His interest in jazz came from hearing guitarist Joe Pass on the radio, after which he started to listen to jazz guitarists Barney Kessel and Wes Montgomery, as well as blues guitarist B.B. King. He went to junior college and Long Beach State College while playing professionally at clubs in Los Angeles.

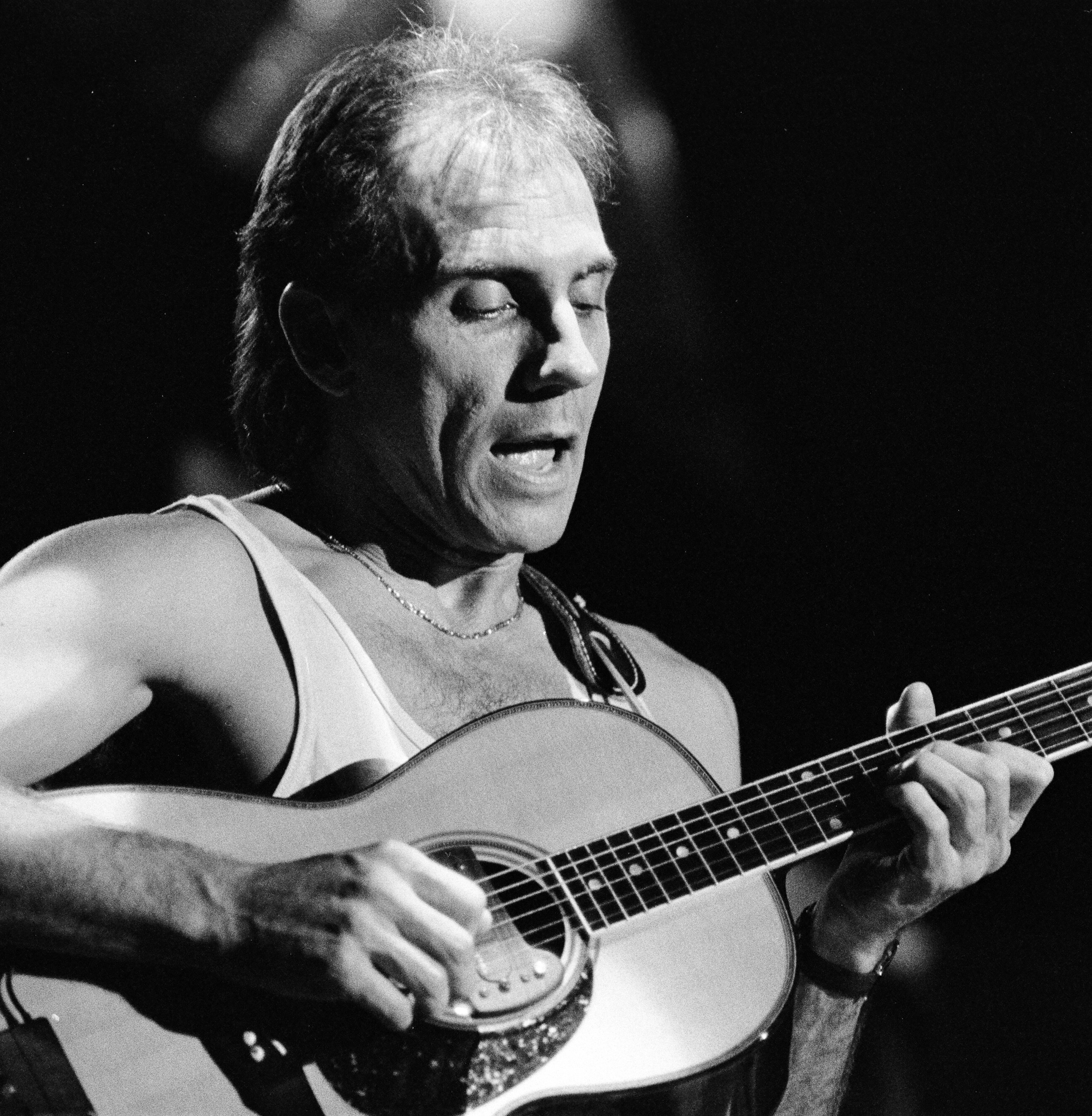
Carlton performing with Yellowjackets at Bailey Hall, Cornell University, September 1987

During the 1970s, he found steady work as a studio musician on electric and acoustic guitar in a variety of genres: pop, jazz pop, rock, rhythm and blues, soul, and country. Carlton appeared in hundreds of recording sessions with Steely Dan, Joni Mitchell, Linda Ronstadt, Michael Jackson, Quincy Jones, Bobby Bland, Sammy Davis Jr., Paulinho Da Costa, Charly García, the Fifth Dimension, Herb Alpert, Christopher Cross, Dolly Parton, Barbra Streisand, Andy Williams, and the Partridge Family. Carlton performed on Mike Post's 1981 "Theme from Hill Street Blues", which won Grammys for 'Best Instrumental Composition' and for 'Best Pop Instrumental Performance'. In 1982, he appeared on The Nightfly by Donald Fagen, lead singer/keyboardist for Steely Dan.

His guitar work on Steely Dan's "Kid Charlemagne" from their 1976 LP The Royal Scam was ranked No. 80 on a list of the best guitar songs by Rolling Stone.

=== Solo career ===
Carlton recorded his debut solo album, With a Little Help from My Friends, in 1968. In the mid-1970s he built a home studio and called it Room 335 after the Gibson ES-335, an electric guitar he is known for playing. He has recorded most of his albums at Room 335. In 1988, with his solo career burgeoning, he was shot in the throat by a teenager outside Room 335 and suffered nerve and vocal cord damage, which delayed completion of the album he was recording at the time, On Solid Ground. His left arm was paralyzed and for six months he was unable to play more than a few notes.

Carlton produced six albums from 1978 to 1984. His version of "Sleepwalk" by Santo Farina climbed the pop and adult contemporary charts. From 1985 to 1990, he did various solo projects, including the live album Last Nite. He was commissioned to compose music for the king of Thailand, Bhumibol Adulyadej, in honor of the king's birthday. He recorded The Jazz King (Sony BMG, 2008) with a jazz orchestra including Tom Scott, Nathan East, and Earl Klugh.

== Awards and honors ==
- Grammy Award for Best Pop Instrumental Performance, "Theme from Hill Street Blues", 1981
- Grammy Award for Best Pop Instrumental Performance, "Minute by Minute", 1987
- Grammy Award for Best Pop Instrumental Album, No Substitutions: Live in Osaka, 2001
- Grammy Award for Best Contemporary Instrumental Album, Take Your Pick, 2010

== Notable instruments ==
Carlton is best known for his 1969 Gibson ES-335, being often referred to as “Mr. 335”. Other guitars he owns and plays include a 1951 Fender Telecaster, a 1964 Fender Stratocaster, and a 1955 Gibson Les Paul Special. He has used a 1958 Fender Deluxe amplifier and his standard setup included a Dumble.

Now he plays Bludotone amplifiers. In 2020, Carlton began endorsing Sire Guitars, with whom he has a signature line of electric guitars.

== 1988 shooting ==
In 1988, Carlton was shot in the neck at the entrance of his home in the Hollywood Hills in Los Angeles. Speaking to the Los Angeles Times, Carlton identified the shooter as one of two young men whom he remembered jogging right after a dog ran by his carport. According to The Hamilton Spectator, the assailant was passing by on a bicycle. The attacker was never identified and the attack was speculated to have been an attempted robbery or an initiation rite for a gang.

It took Carlton "seven or eight months" before he was able to play the guitar again due to an axonal injury on the left side of his neck. He required extensive rehabilitation to build muscles in his left arm and it was about two years before he could perform again.

== Family ==
Carlton married contemporary Christian music artist Michele Pillar in 1987; they divorced in 2013. He is the father of Katie Carlton and Travis Carlton. Travis is a professional bassist.

== Discography ==
=== As leader ===
- With a Little Help from My Friends (Decca, 1968)
- Singing/Playing (Blue Thumb, 1973)
- Larry Carlton (Warner Bros., 1978)
- Mr. 335 Live in Japan (Warner Bros., 1979)
- Strikes Twice (Warner Bros., 1980)
- Sleepwalk (Warner Bros., 1982)
- Eight Times Up [live] (Warner Bros., 1982)
- Friends (Warner Bros., 1983)
- Alone / But Never Alone (MCA 5689, 1986)
- Last Nite (MCA 5866, 1986)
- Discovery (MCA 42003, 1987)
- On Solid Ground (MCA 6237, 1989)
- Christmas at My House (MCA 6322, 1989)
- Collection (GRP, 1990)
- Kid Gloves (GRP, 1992)
- Renegade Gentleman with Terry McMillan (GRP, 1993)
- Live at the Greek with Stanley Clarke (Epic, 1994)
- Larry & Lee with Lee Ritenour (GRP, 1995)
- The Gift (GRP, 1996)
- Fingerprints (Warner Bros., 2000)
- Deep Into It (Warner Bros., 2001)
- No Substitutions: Live in Osaka with Steve Lukather (Favored Nations, 2001)
- Sapphire Blue (Bluebird, 2003)
- Fire Wire (Bluebird, 2006)
- Live in Tokyo with Robben Ford (335 Records, 2007)
- Greatest Hits Rerecorded, Volume One (335, 2007)
- Take Your Pick with Tak Matsumoto (335, 2010)
- Plays the Sound of Philadelphia (335, 2010)
- New Morning: The Paris Concert (335, 2011)
- Four Hands & a Heart, Volume One (335, 2012)
- Unplugged with Robben Ford (335, 2013)
- Four Hands & a Heart: Christmas (335, 2014)
- At Billboard Live Tokyo with David T. Walker (335, 2015)
- At Blue Note Tokyo with Steve Lukather (335, 2016)
- Lights On [live] with the SWR Big Band (335, 2017)
- Soul Searchin' with Paul Brown (Shanachie, 2021)

With The Crusaders

- Crusaders 1 (Blue Thumb, 1972)
- The 2nd Crusade (Blue Thumb, 1973)
- Unsung Heroes (Blue Thumb, 1973)
- Scratch (Blue Thumb, 1974)
- Southern Comfort (Blue Thumb, 1974)
- Chain Reaction (Blue Thumb, 1975)
- Those Southern Knights (Blue Thumb, 1976)
- Free as the Wind (Blue Thumb, 1977)
- The Good and Bad Times (MCA, 1986)
- Happy Again (Sin-Drome, 1995)
- Louisiana Hot Sauce (Sin-Drome, 1996)

With Fourplay

- 4 (Warner Bros., 1998)
- Snowbound (Warner Bros., 1999)
- Yes, Please! (Warner Bros., 2000)
- Heartfelt (Bluebird, 2002)
- Journey (Bluebird, 2004)
- X (Bluebird, 2006)
- Energy (Heads Up, 2008)
- Silver (Heads Up, 2015)

=== As sideman ===
With Paul Anka

- The Painter (United Artists, 1976)
- The Music Man (United Artists, 1977)
- Headlines (RCA Victor, 1979)

With Joan Baez

- Diamonds & Rust (A&M, 1975)
- Speaking of Dreams (Guardian, 1989)

With Bobby Bland

- His California Album (Dunhill, 1973)
- Dreamer (Dunhill, 1974)

With Pat Boone

- Something Supernatural (Lamb & Lion, 1975)

With David Cassidy

- Cherish (Bell, 1972)
- Rock Me Baby (Bell, 1973)
- Dreams Are Nuthin' More Than Wishes (Bell, 1973)

With Paulinho da Costa

- Happy People (Pablo, 1979)
- Sunrise (Pablo, 1984) – rec. 1982
- Paulinho Da Costa (Columbia, 1984)

With Randy Crawford

- Everything Must Change (Warner Bros., 1976)
- Nightline (Warner Bros., 1983)

With Andraé Crouch

- Take Me Back (Light, 1975)
- I'll Be Thinking of You (Elektra, 1979)

With Four Tops

- Keeper of the Castle (Dunhill, 1972)
- Main Street People (Dunhill, 1973)
- Meeting of the Minds (Dunhill, 1974)

With Michael Franks

- The Art of Tea (Reprise, 1976)
- Sleeping Gypsy (Warner Bros., 1977)
- Objects of Desire (Warner Bros., 1982)
- Blue Pacific (Reprise, 1990)

With David Gates

- First (Elektra, 1973)
- Goodbye Girl (Elektra, 1978)

With Lani Hall

- Sun Down Lady (A&M, 1972)
- Hello It's Me (A&M, 1974)
- Sweet Bird (A&M, 1976)

With Albert Hammond

- It Never Rains in Southern California (Epic, 1972)
- The Free Electric Band (Mums, 1973)
- Albert Hammond (Mums, 1974)

With The Hues Corporation

- Freedom for the Stallion (RCA Victor, 1973)
- Love Corporation (RCA Victor, 1975)

With John Klemmer

- Touch (ABC, 1975)
- Barefoot Ballet (ABC, 1976)
- Hush (Elektra, 1981)
- Music (MCA, 1989)

With Bill LaBounty

- The Right Direction (Noteworthy Records, 1991)
- Back To Your Star (Chill Phill Records, 2009)

With Henry Mancini

- Music from the TV Series the Mancini Generation (RCA Victor, 1972)
- Country Gentleman (RCA Victor, 1974)

With Gap Mangione

- Suite Lady (A&M, 1978)
- Dancin' Is Makin' Love (A&M, 1979)

With Megan McDonough

- In the Megan Manner (RCA, 1972)
- Megan Music (RCA, 1972)
- Keepsake (RCA, 1973)
- Sketches (RCA, 1974)

With Joni Mitchell

- Court and Spark (Asylum, 1974)
- The Hissing of Summer Lawns (Asylum, 1975)
- Hejira (Asylum, 1976)
- Don Juan's Reckless Daughter (Asylum, 1977)
- Wild Things Run Fast (Geffen, 1982)

With Wayne Newton

- Daddy Don't You Walk So Fast (Chelsea, 1972)
- While We're Still Young (Chelsea, 1973)

With Michael Omartian

- White Horse (Dunhill, 1974)
- Adam Again (Myrrh, 1977)
- Mainstream (Sparrow, 1982)

With The Partridge Family

- The Partridge Family Notebook (Bell, 1972)
- Shopping Bag (Bell, 1972)
- Bulletin Board (Bell, 1973)
- Crossword Puzzle (Bell, 1973)

With Michele Pillar

- Look Who Loves You Now (Sparrow, 1984)
- Love Makes All the Difference (Urgent, 1991)
- I Hear Angels Calling (335 Records, 2006)

With Johnny Rivers

- L.A. Reggae (United Artists, 1972)
- Blue Suede Shoes (United Artists, 1973)
- New Lovers and Old Friends (Epic, 1975)
- Wild Night (United Artists, 1976)

With Leo Sayer

- Endless Flight (Chrysalis, 1976)
- Thunder in My Heart (Chrysalis, 1977)

With Tom Scott

- Great Scott! (A&M, 1972)
- Tom Scott and the L.A. Express (A&M, 1974)

With James Lee Stanley

- James Lee Stanley (RCA, 1973)
- Three's the Charm (RCA, 1974)

With Steely Dan

- Katy Lied (ABC, 1975)
- The Royal Scam (ABC, 1976)
- Aja (ABC, 1977)
- Gaucho (MCA, 1980)

With B. W. Stevenson

- Lead Free (RCA, 1972)
- My Maria (RCA, 1973)
- Calabasas (RCA, 1974)

With Barbra Streisand

- Stoney End (Columbia, 1971)
- ButterFly (Columbia, 1974)
- Lazy Afternoon (Columbia, 1975)
- Songbird (Columbia, 1978)
- Wet (Columbia, 1979)

With Livingston Taylor

- Man's Best Friend (Epic, 1980)
- Last Alaska Moon (Coconut Bay, 2010)

With others

- The 5th Dimension, Living Together, Growing Together (Bell, 1973)
- Alessi Brothers, Long Time Friends (Qwest, 1982)
- Herb Alpert, Midnight Sun (A&M, 1992)
- America, Harbor (Warner Bros., 1977)
- Chet Atkins, Stay Tuned (Columbia, 1985)
- Hoyt Axton, Fearless (A&M, 1976)
- Anita Baker, Christmas Fantasy (Blue Note, 2005)
- David Benoit, Letter to Evan (GRP, 1992)
- Stephen Bishop, Careless (ABC, 1976)
- Clint Black, Nothin' but the Taillights (RCA, 1997)
- David Blue, Com'n Back for More (Asylum, 1975)
- Terence Boylan, Suzy (Asylum, 1980)
- Teresa Brewer, Music, Music, Music (Amsterdam, 1973)
- The Brothers Johnson, Blam! (A&M Records, 1978)
- Glen Campbell, Bloodline (Capitol, 1976)
- Kim Carnes, Rest on Me (Amos, 1971)
- Vikki Carr, Ms. America (Columbia, 1973)
- Keith Carradine, I'm Easy (Asylum, 1976)
- David Crosby, Oh Yes I Can (A&M, 1989)
- Christopher Cross, Christopher Cross (Warner Bros., 1979)
- Dalbello, Lisa Dal Bello (MCA, 1977)
- Patti Dahlstrom, The Way I Am (20th Century, 1973)
- Eumir Deodato, Love Island (Warner Bros., 1978)
- Neil Diamond, Jonathan Livingston Seagull (Columbia, 1973)
- Cass Elliot, Cass Elliot (RCA Victor, 1972)
- Don Ellis, Haiku (MPS, 1974)
- Tommy Emmanuel, Can't Get Enough (Columbia, 1996)
- Eye to Eye, Shakespeare Stole My Baby (Warner Bros., 1983)
- Donald Fagen, The Nightfly (Warner Bros., 1982)
- Peter Frampton, All Blues (Universal, 2019)
- Peter Gabriel, Walk Through the Fire (Virgin, 1984)
- Charly García, Clics modernos (Interdisc, 1983)
- Jerry Garcia, Compliments of Garcia (Warner Bros., 1974)
- Art Garfunkel, Angel Clare (Columbia, 1973)
- Lesley Gore, Love Me By Name (A&M Records, 1976)
- Marjoe Gortner, Bad, but Not Evil (Chelsea, 1972)
- Hager Twins, Music on the Country Side (Barnaby, 1972)
- Carolyn Hester, Carolyn Hester (RCA Victor, 1973)
- Thelma Houston, I've Got the Music in Me (Sheffield, 1975)
- James Ingram, It's Your Night (Qwest, 1983)
- Chuck Jackson, Through All Times (ABC, 1973)
- Michael Jackson, Off the Wall (Epic, 1979)
- Etta James, Deep in the Night (Warner Bros., 1978)
- Al Jarreau, Glow (Reprise, 1976)
- Billy Joel, Piano Man (Columbia, 1973)
- Booker T. Jones, The Runaway (MCA, 1989)
- Marc Jordan, Mannequin Vivid Sound, (Warner Bros., 1978)
- The Keane Brothers, The Keane Brothers (20th Century Records, 1977)
- Abraham Laboriel, Dear Friends (Bluemoon, 1993)
- James Last, Well Kept Secret (Polydor, 1975)
- Peggy Lee, Norma Deloris Egstrom from Jamestown, North Dakota (Capitol, 1972)
- John Lennon, Rock 'n' Roll (Apple, 1975)
- Lori Lieberman, A Piece of Time (Capitol, 1974)
- Claudine Longet, Let's Spend the Night Together (Barnaby, 1972)
- Jeff Lorber, Private Passion (Warner Bros., 1986)
- Elliot Lurie, Elliot Lurie (Epic, 1975)
- Chuck Mangione, 70 Miles Young (A&M, 1982)
- Ray Manzarek, The Golden Scarab (Mercury, 1974)
- Johnny Mathis, A Special Part of Me (Columbia, 1984)
- Michael McDonald, Motown (Motown, 2003)
- Lonette McKee, Lonette (Sussex, 1974)
- Carmen McRae, Can't Hide Love (Blue Note, 1976)
- Anne Murray, Together (Capitol Records, 1975)
- Teruo Nakamura, Super Friends (Eastworld, 1985)
- Tracy Nelson, Time Is on My Side (MCA, 1976)
- Aaron Neville, Warm Your Heart (A&M, 1991)
- Olivia Newton-John, Soul Kiss (MCA Records, 1985)
- Dolly Parton, 9 to 5 and Odd Jobs (RCA Victor, 1980)
- Mike Post, Television Theme Songs (Elektra, 1982)
- Boots Randolph, Boots with Brass (Monument, 1970)
- Lou Rawls, She's Gone (Bell, 1974)
- Gene Redding, Blood Brother Haven (Capitol, 1974)
- Helen Reddy, Helen Reddy (Capitol Records, 1971)
- The Righteous Brothers, Give It to the People (Capitol, 1974)
- Minnie Riperton, Adventures in Paradise (Epic, 1975)
- Austin Roberts, The Last Thing On My Mind (Chelsea, 1973)
- Linda Ronstadt, Don't Cry Now (Asylum, 1973)
- Diana Ross, Ross (RCA Victor, 1983)
- Buffy Sainte-Marie, Sweet America (ABC, 1976)
- Joey Scarbury, America's Greatest Hero (Elektra, 1981)
- Diane Schuur, The Gathering (Vanguard, 2011)
- Seals and Crofts, Get Closer (Warner Bros., 1976)
- Marlena Shaw, Who Is This Bitch, Anyway? (Blue Note, 1975)
- Ben Sidran, The Doctor Is in (Arista, 1977)
- Dan Siegel, Dan Siegel (Elektra, 1982)
- Sonny & Cher, Mama Was a Rock and Roll Singer, Papa Used to Write All Her Songs (MCA, 1973)
- American Spring, Spring (United Artists, 1972)
- Dusty Springfield, Cameo (Dunhill, 1973)
- Jim Stafford, Not Just Another Pretty Foot (MGM, 1975)
- John Stewart, Sunstorm (Warner Bros., 1972)
- Tavares, Hard Core Poetry (Capitol, 1974)
- Cal Tjader, Last Bolero in Berkeley (Fantasy, 1973)
- Allen Toussaint, Motion (Warner Bros., 1978)
- Valdy, Landscapes (Hayda, 1973)
- Frankie Valli, Closeup (Private Stock, 1975)
- Townes Van Zandt, High, Low and In Between (Poppy, 1971)
- T-Bone Walker, Very Rare (Reprise, 1973)
- Dionne Warwick, Friends in Love (Arista Records, 1982)
- Tim Weisberg, Hurtwood Edge (A&M, 1972)
- Kirk Whalum, The Promise (Columbia, 1989)
- Vanessa Williams, The Sweetest Days (Mercury, 1994)
- Andy Williams, Andy (Columbia, 1976)
- Lorna Wright, Circle of Love (Rocket Records, 1978)

=== Charted singles ===
Year	Title	Peak chart positions			Album
Year	Title	Billboard Hot 100	Adult Cont.	Smooth Jazz Airplay	Album
1981	"Hill Street Blues (theme)" (Mike Post featuring Larry Carlton)	10	—	—N/a	Television Theme Songs
1982	"Sleepwalk"	74	13	—N/a	Sleepwalk
1986	"Smiles and Smiles to Go"	—	35	—N/a	Alone / But Never Alone
1987	"Minute by Minute"	—	25	—N/a	Discovery
2008	"All in Good Time" (re-recording)	—	—	30	Greatest Hits Re-Recorded – Volume One
2011	"I'll Be Around"	—	—	28	Plays the Sounds of Philadelphia
2011	"Back Stabbers"	—	—	21	Plays the Sounds of Philadelphia
2012	"Bad Luck"	—	—	18	Plays the Sounds of Philadelphia
2021	"Miles and Miles to Go" (Larry Carlton and Paul Brown)	—	—	20	Soul Searchin'
2026	"Storybook" (Boney James featuring Larry Carlton)	—	—	1	A Simple Man
"—" denotes a recording that did not chart.

== Video ==
- 1987: Larry Carlton Live
- 1988: Scrooged
- 1989: Star Licks Larry Carlton
- 1992: Star Licks Larry Carlton Vol. 2
- 1997: Larry Carlton Live at Montreal International Jazz Festival
- 2002: Ohne Filter (inakustik)
- 2002: Live at Montreal Jazz Festival (Eagle)
- 2004: Larry Carlton Recorded Live in Paris
- 2005: Carlton/Lukather Band – The Paris Concert (inakustik)
- 2007: Larry Carlton with Robben Ford Live in Osaka (335) - bonus DVD with CD Larry Carlton with Robben Ford Live in Tokyo
- 2008: Carlton, Ford + Autour Du Blues – The Paris Concert (inakustik)
- 2008: Carlton and the Sapphire Blues Band – The Paris Concert (inakustik)
- 2009: Carlton Trio – The Paris Concert (inakustik)
- 2004: Eric Clapton's Crossroads Guitar Festival
