= Stuart Nicholson (jazz historian) =

British jazz historian and academic (born 1948)

- Born: 8 January 1948 (age 78); Cardiff, Wales
- Occupation: Jazz historian

Stuart Nicholson (born 8 January 1948) is a British jazz historian, biographer, music critic, journalist, and academic. A recognised expert on the history of jazz, he has penned several books on jazz history and several biographies on jazz luminaries, including Ella Fitzgerald, Billie Holiday, and Duke Ellington. The author of numerous articles on jazz in newspapers, magazines and academic publications, he has taught as a visiting professor on the faculty of the Leeds College of Music and as a guest lecturer at multiple institutions internationally.

== Career ==
Born in Cardiff, Wales, Stuart Nicholson earned degrees in music theory and clarinet performance from the Welsh College of Music and Drama where he studied from 1967 to 1971. He has written biographies on Ella Fitzgerald, Billie Holiday, and Duke Ellington, and has published articles on jazz related topics in multiple journals and newspapers; including The Observer, The Western Mail, Gramophone, Jazzwise, Jazz Times, and The Wire among others. He has also written broad survey books on jazz and jazz-rock, is a contributing author to The Cambridge Companion to Jazz (2003, Cambridge University Press), and has chronicled the development of jazz fusion in Europe in the 21st century.

Nicholson is a former faculty member of the Leeds College of Music where he worked as a visiting professor. In 2009 he was the keynote speaker of the Jazz Platform at the conference of the European Association of Conservatoires held at the Conservatorium van Amsterdam. He has also appeared as a guest lecturer or as a keynote speaker at music conferences at a variety of institutions, including the Leeds Conservatoire, Trinity Laban Conservatoire of Music and Dance, the University of Music and Performing Arts Vienna, the Welsh College of Music and Drama, the MaiJazz Festival in Norway, and the National Jazz Archive in Essex, England among others.

== Partial list of work ==
- Ella Fitzgerald: a Biography of the First Lady of Jazz (first edition published in 1993, London; second edition published February 2004, London)
- Billie Holiday (1995, London)
- Jazz: the Modern Resurgence (1990, London); republished as Jazz: the 1980s Resurgence (1995, New York City)
- Jazz Rock: a History (1998, London)
- Reminiscing in Tempo: a Portrait of Duke Ellington (1999, London)
- Is Jazz Dead? (Or has it Moved to a New Address) (2005, London)
