= Mike Walker (jazz guitarist) =

British jazz guitarist (born 1962)

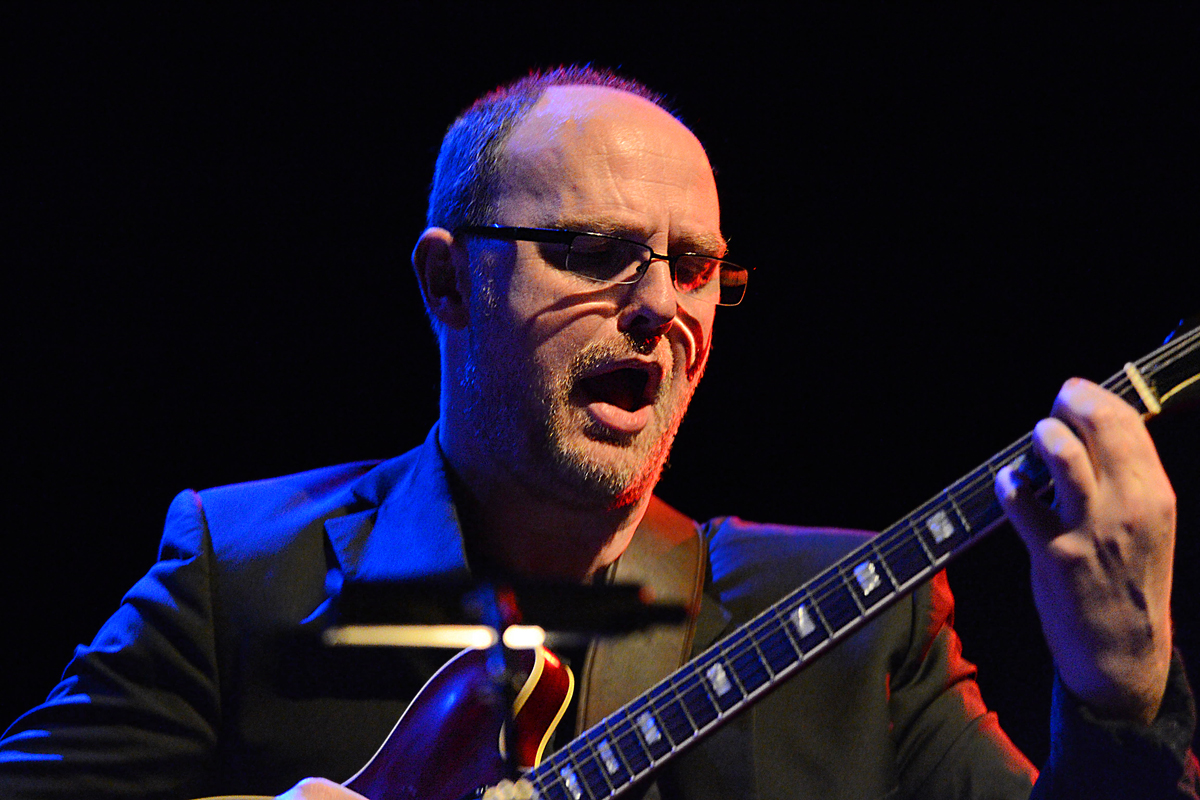
- Mike Walker in 2011

Background information
- Born: 10 July 1962 (age 63); Salford, Lancashire, England
- Genres: Jazz
- Occupation: Musician
- Instrument: Guitar
- Years active: 1981–present
- Website: www.mikejswalker.com

Mike Walker (born 12 July 1962) is a British jazz guitarist.

== Career ==
Walker was influenced by his father's piano playing, his mother's singing, and his brother's guitar playing. He went on to discover a passion for jazz guitarists Wes Montgomery, Joe Pass, Pat Metheny, John Scofield, Larry Coryell, and Tal Farlow.

He joined the jazz fusion band River People with Paul Allen, Tim Franks, and Paul Kilvington in Manchester. In the 1980s, he became a member of a quartet led by vibraphonist Alan Butler and worked with Michael Gibbs and Kenny Wheeler. He worked with Nikki and Richard Iles, then the Sylvan Richardson band, where he met saxophonist Iain Dixon. While in Zurich with the Kenny Wheeler big band, he met Julian Arguelles and joined his quartet.

In the 1990s he toured in bands led by saxophonist Tommy Smith. He has worked as George Russell's guitarist, recording with him on several occasions, and with the Creative Jazz Orchestra, Arild Andersen, Tim Berne, Anthony Braxton, Jacqui Dankworth, Tal Farlow, Bill Frisell, Dave Holland, Vince Mendoza, Bob Moses, Palle Mikkelborg, Mica Paris, John Taylor, Mark-Anthony Turnage, and Norma Winstone.

In May 2008, Walker released his debut album Madhouse and the Whole Thing There. It features the members of Brazil Nuts, plus strings and brass sections, piano, vocals, and French horn. Walker was commissioned to write some music for the Manchester Jazz Festival. He wrote a suite called Ropes that was performed by a 22-piece orchestra, a jazz quintet, and Adam Nussbaum on drums at the Royal Northern College of Music in Manchester.

Walker's sextet includes Les Chisnall, Iain Dixon, Malcolm Edmonstone, Pat Illingworth, and Steve Watts. He is a member of The Printmakers, a band organized by Nikki Iles and Norma Winstone with Mark Lockheart, Steve Watts, and James Maddren; and The Impossible Gentleman with Steve Swallow, Adam Nussbaum, and Gwilym Simcock.

He has taught a music summer school in Altrincham with Iain Dixon, and has been a tutor for the National Youth Jazz Collective, in addition to teaching guitar online.

== Discography ==
=== As leader ===
- Madhouse and the Whole Thing There (2008)
- Beholden (Shell Like, 2014)
- Ropes (Madhouse, 2018)

With Creme Anglaise

- Creme Anglaise (Jazzprint, 2006)

With The Impossible Gentlemen

- The Impossible Gentlemen (Basho, 2011)
- Internationally Recognised Aliens (Basho, 2013)
- Let's Get Deluxe (Basho, 2016)

With The Printmakers

- Westerly (Basho, 2015)

With Real Book North West

- Real Book North West (Jazz Services, 2010)

=== As sideman or guest ===
With Julian Argueelles

- Home Truths (Babel, 1995)
- Skull View (Babel, 1997)
- Escapade (Provocateur, 1999)
- As Above So Below (Provocateur, 2003)

With others

- Anthony Braxton, Composition No. 175, Composition No. 126 Trillium-Dialogues M (Leo, 2006)
- Mike Gibbs, By the Way (Ah Um, 1993)
- Roy Powell, North by Northwest (Nagel Heyer, 2001)
- George Russell, The 80th Birthday Concert (Concept, 2005)
- George Russell, It's About Time: 1996 (Label Bleu, 2016)
