= Julius Hemphill Big Band =

Studio album by Julius Hemphill
- Released: 1988
- Recorded: February 1988
- Genre: Jazz
- Length: 59:36
- Label: Elektra/Musician

Julius Hemphill chronology
Georgia Blue (1984)	Julius Hemphill Big Band (1988)	Fat Man and the Hard Blues (1991)

Julius Hemphill Big Band is an album by jazz saxophonist Julius Hemphill recorded in 1988 for the Elektra/Musician label.

== Reception ==
Professional ratings
Review scores
Source	Rating
AllMusic	3/5 stars
The Penguin Guide to Jazz	3.5/4 stars
The Rolling Stone Jazz & Blues Album Guide	4/5 stars

The editors of AllMusic awarded the album 3 stars, and reviewer Scott Yanow stated: "The only recording by altoist Julius Hemphill at the head of a big band is a mostly very stimulating set of exploratory music... This valuable, but increasingly rare CD is particularly notable for giving one a rare chance to hear Hemphill's adventurous big-band arrangements".

== Track listing ==
All compositions by Julius Hemphill except as indicated

1. "At Harmony" - 9:03
2. "Leora" - 6:02
3. "C/Saw" - 8:29
4. "For Billie" - 8:32
5. "Drunk on God" (Hemphill, K. Curtis Lyle) - 18:53
6. "Bordertown" - 9:35

- Recorded at RCA Studio A in New York City in February 1988

== Personnel ==
- Julius Hemphill - alto saxophone, soprano saxophone
- John Purcell, John Stubblefield, Marty Ehrlich - alto saxophone, soprano saxophone, flute
- J. D. Parran - baritone saxophone, flute
- David Hines, Rasul Siddik - trumpet
- Vincent Chancey - french horn
- Frank Lacy - trombone
- David Taylor - bass trombone
- Bill Frisell, Jack Wilkins - guitar
- Jerome Harris - electric bass
- Ronnie Burrage - drums
- Gordon Gottlieb - percussion
- K. Curtis Lyle - speaker (track 5)
- Darrold Hunt - conductor (track 5)
