= Dance of the Love Ghosts =

Studio album by John Carter
- Released: 1987
- Genre: Jazz
- Label: Gramavision
- Producer: Jonathan F. P. Rose

John Carter chronology
Castles of Ghana (1986)	Dance of the Love Ghosts (1987)	Fields (1988)

Dance of the Love Ghosts is an album by the American musician John Carter, released in 1987. It is the third part of Carter's Roots and Folklore: Episodes in the Development of American Folk Music series.

== Production ==
The album is about the Middle Passage and the initial experiences of enslaved Africans. It was engineered by Jim Anderson and Jim Goatly. Carter incorporated electronic elements for the first time on a record. He worked with musicians based mostly in New York City, including Benny Powell on trombone, Bobby Bradford on cornet, Fred Hopkins on bass, and Marty Ehrlich on clarinet. Don Preston contributed on keyboards; Andrew Cyrille contributed on drums, with additional rhythms provided by three Ashanti percussionists. Violinist Terry Jenoure sang on "The Captain's Dilemma". "The Silent Drum" employs African polyrhythms.

== Critical reception ==
Professional ratings
Review scores
Source	Rating
AllMusic	3/5 stars
DownBeat	5/5 stars
The Encyclopedia of Popular Music	3/5 stars
Omaha World-Herald	5/5 stars
The Philadelphia Inquirer	4/4 stars
The Rolling Stone Jazz & Blues Album Guide	4.5/5 stars

The Chicago Sun-Times called the album "an emotionally compelling and sometimes gripping telling of Africans being shipped to America as slaves". The Chicago Tribune said that "the colors of the writing are Ellingtonian, which is as it should be, and Bradford's singing tone at once sears and heals the soul." The New York Times labeled the music "a more open-ended, large-scale, abstract kind of chamber jazz".

The Buffalo News noted the influence of Charles Mingus, particularly on the first two tracks. The Miami Herald praised "the loose, up-tempo swing groove" of the rhythm section. The Philadelphia Inquirer listed Dance of the Love Ghosts among the 20 best jazz albums of 1987.

== Track listing ==
No.	Title	Length
1.	"Dance of the Love Ghosts"
2.	"The Silent Drum"
3.	"Journey"
4.	"The Captain's Dilemma"
5.	"Moon Waltz"
