= Castles of Ghana =

Studio album by John Carter
- Released: 1986
- Recorded: November 1985
- Studios: Eras, New York, NY
- Label: Gramavision 18-8603
- Producers: John Carter, Jonathan F. P. Rose

John Carter chronology
Dauwhe (1982)	Castles of Ghana (1986)	Dance of the Love Ghosts (1987)

Castles of Ghana is an album by the American musician John Carter. It was released in 1986. The composition was commissioned by the New York Shakespeare Festival for the concert series New Jazz at the Public, produced by Joseph Papp, and supported by the National Endowment for the Arts as well as the New York State Council on the Arts. Carter premiered the music at The Public Theater, in November 1985, and recorded the cycle at Eras Studio in New York the same month. Carter chose the title after being informed that former Ghanaian castles had been used to hold Africans sold into slavery.

== Production ==
The album was the second part of a five-part series on Black history, titled Roots and Folklore: Episodes in the Development of American Folk Music. The liner notes were written by Carter, who described the atrocity of slavery. Benny Powell played trombone on the album; Andrew Cyrille played drums. Carter called the composition "musical projections of the high emotions that must have gripped all the participants of this real life human dilemma."

== Critical reception ==
Professional ratings
Review scores
Source	Rating
AllMusic	4/5 stars
Robert Christgau	B−
The Encyclopedia of Popular Music	3/5 stars
MusicHound Jazz: The Essential Album Guide	4/5 stars

Robert Christgau wrote that "this ain't jazz, it's modern chamber music, quite European in view of its ostensible subject." The New York Times called the album "a powerful jazz composition in its own right and an ideal setting for the composer's hard-edged, penetrating clarinet improvisations."

The Gazette noted that it "is not easy listening," writing that "Carter's compositions are closer to the European brand of improvised jazz, without the rhythmic and harmonic convention usually associated with the music." The Los Angeles Times determined that Carter demonstrates "his amazing facility for jumping from one register to another with an ease that seems to extend the [clarinet]'s naturally capacious range."

The Philadelphia Inquirer listed Castles of Ghana among the 10 best jazz albums of 1986.

== Track listing ==
No.	Title	Length
1.	"Castles of Ghana"	13:22
2.	"Evening Prayer"	6:10
3.	"Conversations"	5:49
4.	"The Fallen Prince"	6:08
5.	"Theme of Desperation"	4:52
6.	"Capture"	11:19
7.	"Postlude"	0:40

== Personnel ==
- John Carter – clarinet, vocals
- Terry Jenoure – violin, vocals
- Marty Ehrlich – bass clarinet, bells, gong
- Bobby Bradford – cornet
- Baikida Carroll – trumpet, vocals
- Benny Powell – trombone
- Richard Davis – acoustic bass
- Andrew Cyrille – drums, percussion

Production

- John Carter – producer
- Jonathan F. P. Rose – producer, mixing engineer
- Jim Anderson – recording and mixing engineer
- Bob Ludwig – mastering (Masterdisk, New York)
