= Nikki Iles =

British jazz composer, pianist and educator

Nikki Iles BEM
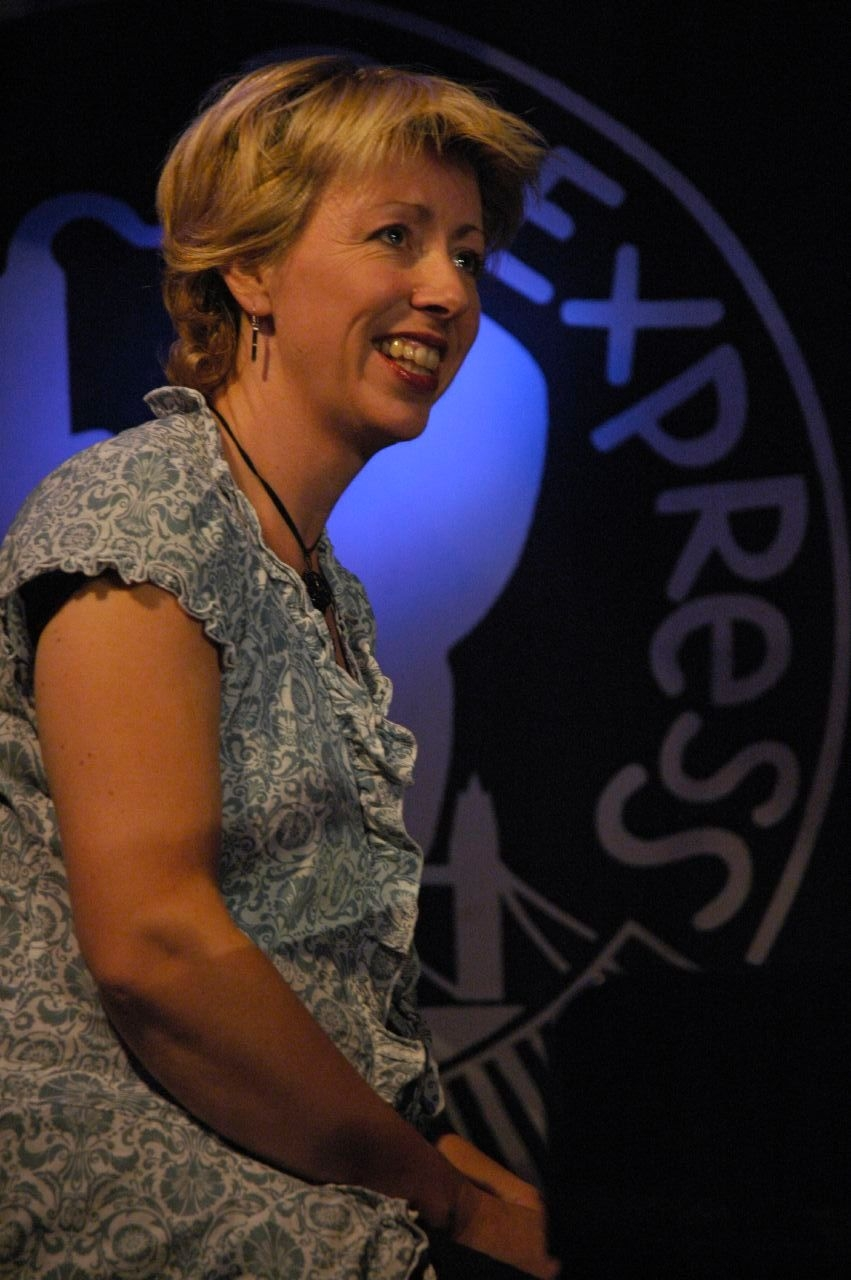

Background information
- Born: Nikki Anne Burnham; 16 May 1963 (age 62); Dunstable, Bedfordshire, UK
- Genres: Jazz
- Occupations: Musician, composer, educator
- Instrument: Piano
- Years active: Mid-1980s–present
- Labels: 33Jazz, Basho
- Website: www.nikkiiles.co.uk

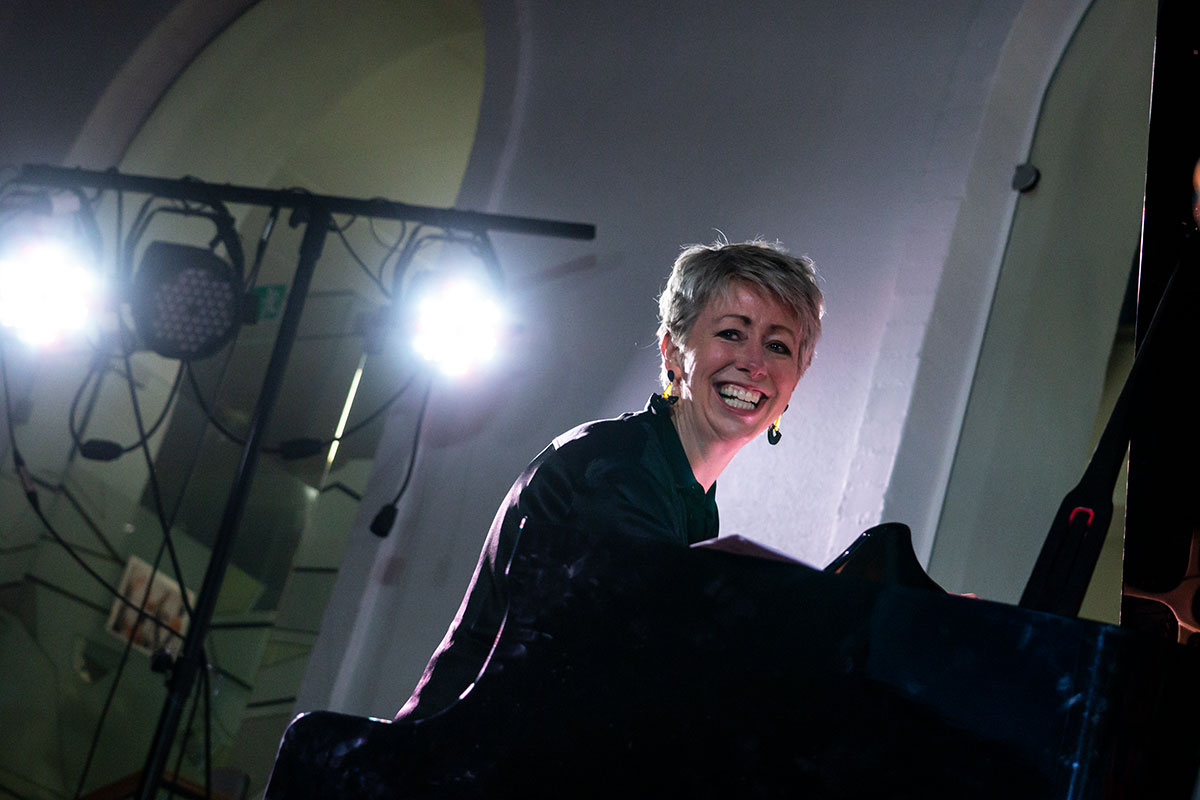
Aarhus (Denmark 2022) Photo Hreinn Gudlaugsson

Nikki Anne Iles BEM (née Burnham; born 16 May 1963) is a British jazz composer, pianist and educator.

== Early life ==
Iles was born in Dunstable, Bedfordshire, on 16 May 1963. She started her musical education at primary school, where she learnt to play the harmonica and the clarinet, and at eleven years old she won a junior exhibition at the Royal Academy of Music, where she studied clarinet and piano from 1974 to 1981. She became a member of the Bedfordshire Youth Jazz Orchestra. She went on to the Leeds College of Music (1981–1984).

== Later life and career ==
After graduating from the Leeds College of Music, she decided to settle in Yorkshire. After marrying trumpeter Richard Iles, she changed her surname from Burnham. She joined his band Emanon, with which she played some of her compositions. Iles also began playing with several London-based bands, such as those led by Steve Argüelles, Mick Hutton and Stan Sulzmann.

Iles won the 1996 John Dankworth Special Award at the BT Jazz Festival. Following a serious car crash after a gig, Iles opted to settle in London.

Iles was a senior lecturer at Middlesex University, and has taught at the University of York, Leeds College of Music, the Guildhall School of Music, and in Bulgaria, Holland, France, and Finland. In 2021 Iles was awarded the Ivor Novello Jazz Composition Award for her work 'The Caged Bird'.

Iles was awarded the British Empire Medal (BEM) in the 2022 New Year Honours for services to music.

In 2025 Iles was announced as the new principal conductor of Hamburg's NDR Bigband.

== Discography ==
=== As leader/co-leader ===
Year recorded	Title	Label	Notes
2023	Face to Face	Edition Records	With de:NDR Bigband
2015	Westerly	Basho	As The Printmakers; with Mike Walker (electric guitar), Mark Lockheart (saxes), Steve Watts (bass), James Maddren (drums), Norma Winstone (vocals)
2012	Hush	Basho	Trio, with Rufus Reid (bass), Jeff Williams (drums)
2002	Everything I Love	Basho	Trio, with Duncan Hopkins (bass), Anthony Michelli (drums)
2002	Veils	Symbol	Quintet, with Stan Sulzmann (soprano sax, tenor sax), Mike Outram (guitar), Mike Hutton (bass), Anthony Michelli (drums)
1998?	Snap	RFM	As Foolish Hearts (Iles, Steve Berry, Paul Clarvis, and Anthony Kerr)
1997?	Change of Sky	33Jazz	Duo, co-led with Tina May (vocals)
1997	The Tan Tien	FMR	with Martin Speake

=== As sidewoman ===
With Anthony Braxton

- Composition No. 175 / Composition No. 126: Trillium Dialogues M (Leo, 1994)

With Mike Gibbs

- By the Way (Ah Um, 1993)

With Ingrid Laubrock

- Some Times (Candid, 1998)

With Tina May

- One Fine Day (33Jazz, 1999)
- I'll Take Romance (Linn, 2002)
- More Than You Know (33Jazz, 2004)
- A Wing and a Prayer (33Jazz, 2005–06)

With Sylvan Richardson

- Pyrotechnics (Blue Note, 1992)

With Geoff Simkins

- Don't Ask (Symbol, 1999)

With Martin Speake

- Secret (Basho, 2000)

With Stan Sulzmann

- Treasure Trove (ASC, 1995)

With Dick Walter/Jazz Craft Ensemble

- Secret Moves (ASC, 1999)
