= Knitting Factory (Piano/Quartet) 1994, Vol. 1 =

Live album by Anthony Braxton
- Released: 1995
- Recorded: November 8–13, 1994
- Venue: Knitting Factory, NYC
- Genre: Jazz
- Length: 151:00
- Label: Leo; CD LR 222/223
- Producer: Leo Feigin

Anthony Braxton chronology
Piano Quartet, Yoshi's 1994 (1994)	Knitting Factory (Piano/Quartet) 1994, Vol. 1 (1995)	Knitting Factory (Piano/Quartet) 1994, Vol. 2 (1994)

Knitting Factory (Piano/Quartet) 1994, Vol. 1 is a live album by composer and pianist Anthony Braxton with a quartet, recorded at the Knitting Factory in 1994 and released on the Leo label.

== Reception ==
Professional ratings
Review scores
Source	Rating
Allmusic	4/5 stars
The Penguin Guide to Jazz Recordings	3/4 stars

The Allmusic review by Chris Kelsey stated "Braxton's pianistic style is much like his alto style. His rhythms are not even subdivisions of the beat. Braxton treats the pulse as a fence on which to hang the rhythms when he feels the urge, though he's just as likely to run alongside it, or ignore its existence altogether; he treats the harmonies with a similar bashful regard. His technique is that of an ingenious autodidact; he can definitely play, in his own way, but the way he treats the music is almost too personal. There's not much here that relates to tradition, and this vein of jazz is inextricably bound to tradition. This album is interesting in its way, but better to hear Braxton perform his own compositions in his native tongue than someone else's tunes in a borrowed language, even if he speaks that language in such a colorful and discerning dialect".

== Track listing ==
Disc one

1. "Wow" (Lennie Tristano) – 18:53
2. "Darn That Dream" (Jimmy Van Heusen, Eddie DeLange) – 13:10
3. "In Your Own Sweet Way" (Dave Brubeck) – 14:46
4. "Self Portrait in Three Colours" (Charles Mingus) – 16:24
5. "Off Minor" (Thelonious Monk) – 12:05

Disc two

1. "Epistrophy" (Monk, Kenny Clarke) – 21:28
2. "The Song Is You" (Jerome Kern, Oscar Hammerstein II) – 12:48
3. "The Star-Crossed Lovers" (Duke Ellington, Billy Strayhorn) – 11:31
4. "Goodbye Pork Pie Hat" (Mingus) – 16:05
5. "Virgo" (Wayne Shorter) – 13:49

== Personnel ==
- Anthony Braxton – piano
- Marty Ehrlich – alto saxophone, soprano saxophone, clarinet
- Joe Fonda – bass
- Pheeroan akLaff – drums
