= Rich Halley =

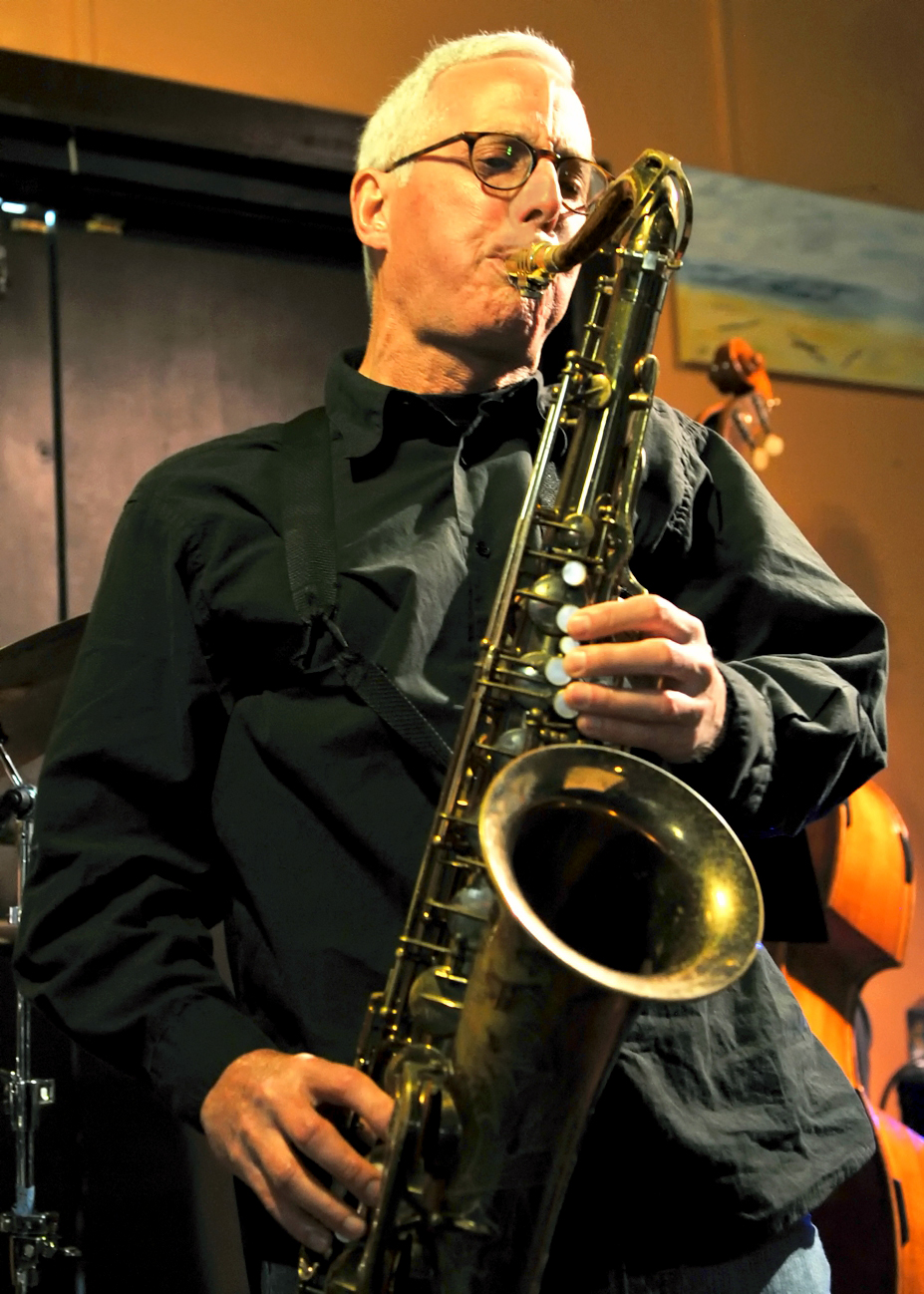
- Rich Halley performing in 2011

Background information
- Born: November 25, 1947 (age 78); Portland, Oregon
- Genres: Jazz
- Instrument: Tenor saxophone
- Label: Pine Eagle Records
- Website: www.richhalley.com

Rich Halley (born November 25, 1947, in Portland, Oregon) is an American jazz tenor saxophonist and composer. He has released 26 recordings as a leader. As Down Beat described him: “Oregon-based saxophonist Rich Halley has been turning out smart brawny music for a couple of decades”. All About Jazz called his music “a sublime balance of the cerebral and visceral”.

== Early life ==
Rich Halley is the son of Richard Halley Sr., an economics professor at Portland State University, and Libby Anne Halley, a reading and special education teacher. Growing up, he spent much of his time hiking, camping, hunting and fishing, and at an early age developed a lifelong passion for nature and the outdoors. At 15, he discovered jazz, and immediately became intensely interested in the music. Halley began playing clarinet at age 11 and tenor saxophone at age 15.

== Early career ==
Halley started playing in big bands and small jazz groups while he was in high school. Between 1965 and 1966 he lived in Cairo, Egypt where he played in a band with an international repertoire. When he arrived at the University of Chicago in 1966 he found himself surrounded by blues music and culture and the explorations of the Association for the Advancement of Creative Musicians. In 1967-68 he played in Home Juice, a blues band in Chicago that included singer/harmonic player Jeff Carp, trumpeter Jordan Sandke, guitarist Paul Asbell, bassist Al McClain and drummer Paul Morris. In 1968, he moved back to the Western United States where he played in Latin bands, rhythm & blues bands and jazz groups in San Francisco, Albuquerque and Portland. His early influences included Sonny Rollins, John Coltrane, Dexter Gordon, Ornette Coleman and Albert Ayler as well as Jim Pepper, who was also from Portland.

Between 1968 and 1975, he interspersed periods of musical activity with time spent climbing mountains and exploring the deserts and jungles of the Western US, Mexico and Central America.

From 1977 to 1981 Halley performed in the experimental group Multnomah Rhythm Ensemble that explored improvised music in combination with multi-media. His first recording, Multnomah Rhythms (Avocet), was released in 1983.

== 1980s and 1990s ==
During the 80s and 90s, Halley was the leader of the Lizard Brothers, a three or four horn sextet that released five recordings on Avocet and Nine Winds and performed in the US and Canada. The Lizard Brothers featured complex, multi-sectioned charts combined with open improvisation. At various times the group included reed player Vinny Golia, trombonist Michael Vlatkovich, trumpeter Rob Blakeslee, saxophonist Troy Grugett, saxophonist Gary Harris, trombonist Tom Hill, pianist Geoff Lee, bassist Phil Sparks and drummer William Thomas.

In 1991-92 Halley played in the cooperative band Jack's Headlights that included trumpeter Rob Blakeslee, saxophonist Hans Teuber, bassist Michael Bisio and drummer Aaron Alexander.

Halley co-founded Portland's Creative Music Guild in 1991 after being disappointed with the lack of performing opportunities for non-traditional jazz musicians. Since 1994 he has been the musical director of the Penofin Jazz Festival in Northern California, which has presented many leading creative jazz artists.

== 2000s ==
In 2001, Halley formed a trio with bassist Clyde Reed and drummer Dave Storrs. This band was more oriented toward free improvisation and less toward writing. From 2001 to 2005 the group released three trio recordings on Louie Records plus a quartet recording with cornetist Bobby Bradford in 2003.

Rich Halley is also the leader of the Outside Music Ensemble, a four horn/two percussion sextet that performs in purely acoustic outdoor settings. For 13 consecutive years the OME performed annual hike-in concerts on top of the butte in Powell Butte Nature Park as part of the Portland Parks Summer Concert Series. The group includes trombonist Michael Vlatkovich, trumpeter Jim Knodle, saxophonist Troy Grugett, percussionist Dave Storrs and drummer Carson Halley.

== Recent ==
In 2010 Halley released Live at the Penofin Jazz Festival featuring cornetist Bobby Bradford on his own label, Pine Eagle Records. Around this time he formed the Rich Halley 4 with trombonist Michael Vlatkovich, bassist Clyde Reed and drummer Carson Halley, his son. This group has released six recordings.

Halley emphasizes the importance of what he calls compositional group improvisation. This is the spontaneous development of musical structures by the group as it improvises, creating a varied musical story which provides a foundation for the drama and emotion in the music.

Rich Halley has worked with poets and dancers over the years, and in 2011, he released Children of the Blue Supermarket with poet Dan Raphael and drummer Carson Halley. This CD was picked as one of the best recordings of the year by Tom Hull in the 2011 Rhapsody (online music service) jazz poll.

In 2011, the Rich Halley 4 released Requiem for a Pit Viper, which was picked by Francis Davis in the Village Voice as one of the best recordings of the year. Davis recognized Halley as one of the top up and coming saxophonists in jazz.

In 2012, the Rich Halley 4 released Back From Beyond, which was listed in Down Beat as one of the best CD's of the year.

Halley has performed with Obo Addy, Matthew Shipp, Michael Bisio, Newman Taylor Baker, Rob Blakeslee, Bobby Bradford, Nels Cline, David Friesen, Vinny Golia, Julius Hemphill, Andrew Hill, Oliver Lake, Tony Malaby and Michael Vlatkovich.

== Personal life ==
Halley was educated as a field biologist and received a Master of Science in Biology from the University of New Mexico where he did research on rattlesnakes. His lifelong interest in nature has informed his music and led him on many trips into wilderness regions around the world. He worked for many years in information technology. He is married to Betty Halley and lives in Portland, Oregon.

== Discography ==
- Multnomah Rhythms, Rich Halley, Avocet P-100-1, 1983
- Ross Island, Dave Storrs and the Tone Sharks w/ Rich Halley, Avocet P-101, 1984
- Song of the Backlands, Rich Halley and the Lizard Brothers, Avocet P-103, 1985
- Jumper Cables, Dave Storrs and the Tone Sharks w/ Rich Halley, Avocet P-104, 1987
- Cracked Sidewalks, Rich Halley and the Lizard Brothers, Avocet P-105, 1988
- Saxophone Animals, Rich Halley and the Lizard Brothers, Nine Winds 0139, 1991
- Umatilla Variations, Rich Halley and the Lizard Brothers, Nine Winds 0163, 1994
- Live at Beanbenders, Rich Halley and the Lizard Brothers, Nine Winds 0215, 1998
- Waterloo Ice House, Rob Blakeslee, Rich Halley, Clyde Reed, Dave Storrs, Louie 012, 1999
- Coyotes in the City, Rich Halley, Clyde Reed, Dave Storrs, Louie 021, 2001
- Objects, Rich Halley, Clyde Reed, Dave Storrs, Louie 025, 2002
- Trialogue, Mark Burdon, Rich Halley, Josh Dahlager, Straw Dog 02/01, 2003
- The Blue Rims, Rich Halley, Bobby Bradford, Clyde Reed, Dave Storrs, Louie 030, 2003
- Across 36 Continents, Michael Vlatkovich Ensemble w/ Rich Halley, pfMENTUM 030, 2005
- Mountains and Plains, Rich Halley, Clyde Reed, Dave Storrs, Louie 035, 2005
- Live at the Penofin Jazz Festival, Rich Halley, Bobby Bradford, Clyde Reed, Carson Halley, Pine Eagle 001, 2010
- Children of the Blue Supermarket, Dan Raphael, Rich Halley, Carson Halley, Pine Eagle 002, 2011
- Requiem for a Pit Viper, Rich Halley, Michael Vlatkovich, Clyde Reed, Carson Halley, Pine Eagle 003, 2011
- Back from Beyond, Rich Halley, Michael Vlatkovich, Clyde Reed, Carson Halley, Pine Eagle 004, 2012
- Crossing the Passes, Rich Halley, Michael Vlatkovich, Clyde Reed, Carson Halley, Pine Eagle 005, 2013
- The Wisdom of Rocks, Rich Halley, Michael Vlatkovich, Clyde Reed, Carson Halley, Pine Eagle 006, 2014
- Creating Structure, Rich Halley, Michael Vlatkovich, Clyde Reed, Carson Halley, Pine Eagle 007, 2015
- Eleven, Rich Halley, Michael Vlatkovich, Clyde Reed, Carson Halley, Pine Eagle 008, 2015
- The Outlier, Rich Halley, Vinny Golia, Michael Vlatkovich, Clyde Reed, Carson Halley, Pine Eagle 009, 2016
- The Wild, Rich Halley, Carson Halley, Pine Eagle 010, 2017
- The Literature, Rich Halley, Clyde Reed, Carson Halley, Pine Eagle 011, 2018
- Terra Incognita, Rich Halley, Matthew Shipp, Michael Bisio, Newman Taylor Baker, Pine Eagle 012, 2019
- The Shape of Things, Rich Halley, Matthew Shipp, Michael Bisio, Newman Taylor Baker, Pine Eagle 013, 2020
- Boomslang, Rich Halley, Carson Halley, Clyde Reed, Dan Clucas, Pine Eagle 014, 2021
- Fire Within, Rich Halley, Matthew Shipp, Michael Bisio, Newman Taylor Baker, Pine Eagle 015, 2023
- Dusk and Dawn, Rich Halley, Michael Vlatkovich, Clyde Reed, Carson Halley, Pine Eagle 016, 2024
- A Distant Land, Rich Halley, Michael Vlatkovich, Andrew Jones, Carson Halley, Pine Eagle 017, 2026
