= Five Chord Stud =

Studio album by Julius Hemphill
- Released: 1993
- Recorded: November 18 & 19, 1993
- Genre: Jazz
- Length: 63:57
- Label: Black Saint
- Producer: Julius Hemphill

Julius Hemphill chronology
Oakland Duets (1993)	Five Chord Stud (1993)	Chile New York (1998)

Five Chord Stud is an album by jazz saxophonist/composer Julius Hemphill recorded in 1993 for the Italian Black Saint label.

== Reception ==
Professional ratings
Review scores
Source	Rating
AllMusic	4.5/5 stars
The Penguin Guide to Jazz Recordings	4/4 stars
The Rolling Stone Jazz & Blues Album Guide	3.5/5 stars

The editors of AllMusic awarded the album 4½ stars, and reviewer Scott Yanow wrote: "The generally fascinating music rewards repeated listenings but one has to have an open mind before putting it on".

The authors of The Penguin Guide to Jazz Recordings noted that, although Hemphill was not able to perform on the album due to health concerns, "this is unmistakably Hemphill's group and Hemphill's music."

Jim Macnie of Billboard stated that Hemphill's arrangements "were always intricate, belying the natural earthiness that they often conjure. Sometimes stereotyped as a radical, Hemphill's tunes nonetheless could contain outright beauty."

== Track listing ==
All compositions by Julius Hemphill

1. "Band Theme" - 5:38
2. "Mr. Critical" - 3:44
3. "Shorty" - 6:49
4. "Mirrors" - 5:49
5. "Five Chord Stud" - 13:46
6. "The Moat and the Bridge" - 7:20
7. "Georgia Blue" - 5:48
8. "Flush" - 7:51
9. "Spiritual Chairs" - 7:12
  - Recorded at Sear Sound in New York City on November 18 & 19, 1993

== Personnel ==
- Julius Hemphill - conductor, composer
- Tim Berne - alto saxophone
- Marty Ehrlich - soprano saxophone, alto saxophone
- Sam Furnace - soprano saxophone, alto saxophone
- James Carter - tenor saxophone
- Andrew White - tenor saxophone
- Fred Ho - baritone saxophone
