= Live at Kassiopeia =

Live album by Julius Hemphill and Peter Kowald
- Released: 2011
- Recorded: January 8, 1987
- Venue: Kassiopeia, Wuppertal, Germany
- Genre: Free jazz
- Label: NoBusiness Records; NBCD 35-36
- Producer: Danas Mikailionis

Julius Hemphill chronology
Chile New York (1998)	Live at Kassiopeia (2011)	The Boyé Multi-National Crusade for Harmony (2021)

Live at Kassiopeia is a live album by saxophonist Julius Hemphill and bassist Peter Kowald. It was recorded in Wuppertal, Germany, on January 8, 1987, and was released by NoBusiness Records as a double album in both LP and CD format in 2011, 24 years later. Disc 1 features three Hemphill solos followed by a Kowald solo, while disc 2 contains three duos.

== Reception ==
Professional ratings
Review scores
Source	Rating
All About Jazz	3.5/5 stars
Tom Hull – on the Web	B+
The Free Jazz Collective	4/5 stars

In a review for All About Jazz, John Sharpe called the album "a fascinating chronicle," and singled out Kowald's solo for praise, writing: "At times he exploits the harmonics where his splintered vocalized inflections create the illusion of multiple voices. In addition he does actually make use of his voice, subtly blending the throat singing he had learned from Siberian collaborations with his arco technique, adding a fetching human vulnerability."

Nilan Perera of Exclaim! stated: "when a vault somewhere pops open and a collaboration of two of improvised music's titans blows in from Wuppertal in 1987, one can be forgiven for being rendered speechless... This is easily one of the best releases of the year, if not the decade, and a must-have for anyone seriously interested in music."

Paris Transatlantic's Michael Rosenstein praised the album's "stellar music," and commented: "By the time they start the second, 36-minute [duo] improvisation, both men are firing on all cylinders: there's constant give and take as Hemphill's lithe melodicism, full of leaping intervals and circuitous lines, plays off Kowald's rumbling pizzicato, crying bent notes, and dark sliding tonalities."

A reviewer for The Free Jazz Collective described Hemphill's solos as "playful, jazzy, rhythmic, using phrases from old jazz traditionals and from the blues, and with an incredible sense of focus," while Kowald's solo is "more open and shifting with the new ideas coming, moving into different directions." They called the second duo the "pièce-de-resistance," noting that the musicians are "playing up a storm, full of intensity and sensitivity."

In an article for Dusted Magazine, Bill Meyer called the album "an unlikely but successful encounter," and wrote that, in his solos, "Hemphill navigates the blues, but he doesn't stop there. You can also hear his roots in technically imposing bebop... and a crying spirit that burrows beyond genre into a deep vein of longing."

Stuart Broomer of The New York City Jazz Record stated: "The duet CD presents two musicians equally familiar with the intersection of free jazz and free improvisation... The release is a fine commemoration of two lost masters."

== Track listing ==
Disc 1

1. "Solo I" (Hemphill) – 6:58
2. "Solo II" (Hemphill) – 7:23
3. "Solo III" (Hemphill) – 7:40
4. "Solo" (Kowald) – 32:20

Disc 2

1. "Duo I" (Hemphill/Kowald) – 7:27
2. "Duo II" (Hemphill/Kowald) – 36:31
3. "Duo III" (Hemphill/Kowald) – 2:49

== Personnel ==
- Julius Hemphill – soprano saxophone, alto saxophone (disc 1, tracks 1–3; disc 2, all tracks)
- Peter Kowald – bass (disc 1, track 4; disc 2, all tracks)
