= Marty Ehrlich =

Musical artist (born 1955)

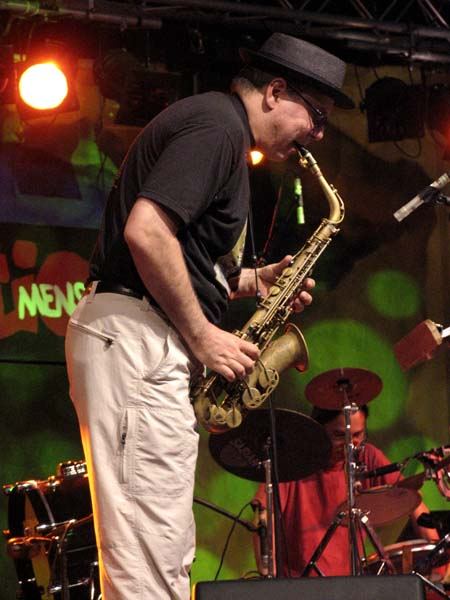

Background information
- Born: Martin Lewis Ehrlich; May 31, 1955 (age 71); Saint Paul, Minnesota, U.S.
- Genre: Avant-garde jazz
- Occupation: Musician
- Instruments: Saxophone; clarinet; flute
- Years active: 1973–present
- Labels: Tzadik; Palmetto; Enja; New World

Marty Ehrlich (born May 31, 1955) is a multi-instrumentalist (saxophones, clarinets, flutes) and is considered one of the leading proponents of the 1980s New York City "downtown" avant-garde jazz era.

== Early life ==
Though born in St. Paul, Minnesota, the portion of Ehrlich's youth spent in St. Louis, Missouri, was particularly important. As a high school student at University City High School in nearby University City, the teenager came into contact with the influential Black Artists' Group (BAG, 1968–72) which was modelled after the AACM in Chicago.

Later, during formal studies at the New England Conservatory, Ehrlich developed a particularly close relationship with pianist Jaki Byard. It was here that he was most deeply schooled in traditional jazz forms, as well as Western European classical music. During these formative years, Ehrlich was exposed to the cultural, political and musical workings of radical African-American art, and was mentored by such legends as Julius Hemphill and Oliver Lake. Often associated with "Radical Jewish Culture" and cult icon John Zorn, Ehrlich has throughout the years nevertheless resisted classification under any single musical genre. He has, for instance, been a mainstay of trumpeter Randy Sandke's Inside Out ensemble, which offers a unique combination of avant-garde–associated figures and mainstreamers.

== Career ==
Since his 1978 move to New York, Ehrlich has been a performer and leader with numerous bands of legendary repute, as well as a soloist for a number of major orchestras. But perhaps his most important recent contribution to the story of Jazz and improvised musics, The Long View, was completed at a residency in Harvard. The composition (scored for an ensemble of both strings and horns) is inspired from abstract paintings by Oliver Jackson, and has been hailed as "one of a handful of integral long-form works in jazz, standing beside those of the likes of Hemphill, Mingus, and Ellington" (Boston Phoenix).

Ehrlich currently lives in New York City, commuting to teach at Hampshire College, and devoting much energy to his duo with pianist Myra Melford, and trio with Mark Dresser (contrabass) and Andrew Cyrille (drums).

== Discography ==
=== As leader/co-leader ===
- In Duet - Unison with John Lindberg (CECMA, 1982)
- The Welcome (Sound Aspects, 1984)
- Pliant Pliant (Enja, 1988)
- The Traveller's Tale (Enja, 1990) – Stan Strickland, Lindsey Horner, Bobby Previte
- Falling Man with Anthony Cox (Muse, 1991) – recorded in 1989
- Marty Ehrlich's Dark Woods Ensemble, Emergency Peace (New World, 1991) – Abdul Wadud, Muhal Richard Abrams, Lindsey Horner
- Side by Side (Enja, 1991) – with Frank Lacy, Wayne Horvitz, Anthony Cox, Andrew Cyrille
- Can You Hear a Motion? (Enja, 1994) – with Stan Strickland, Michael Formanek, Bobby Previte
- Marty Ehrlich's Dark Woods Ensemble, Just Before the Dawn (New World, 1995) – with Vincent Chancey, Erik Friedlander, Mark Helias, Don Alias
- New York Child (Enja, 1996) – with Stan Strickland, Michael Cain, Michael Formanek, Bill Stewart
- The Open Air Meeting with Muhal Richard Abrams (New World , 1997)
- Light at the Crossroads with Ben Goldberg (Songlines Recordings, 1997)
- Marty Ehrlich's Dark Woods Ensemble, Live Wood (Music & Arts, 1997) – with Erik Friedlander, Mark Helias
- Marty Ehrlich's Dark Woods Ensemble, Sojourn (Tzadik, 1999) – with Erik Friedlander, Mark Helias, Marc Ribot
- Relativity with Michael Formanek and Peter Erskine (Enja, 1999)
- The Waiting Game with Mike Nock (Naxos Jazz, 2000)
- C / D / E with Andrew Cyrille and Mark Dresser (PAO, 2000)
- Marty Ehrlich's Traveler's Tales, Malinke's Dance (OmniTone, 2000) – with Tony Malaby, Jerome Harris, Bobby Previte
- Song (Enja, 2001) – with Uri Caine, Michael Formanek, Billy Drummond, Ray Anderson
- Yet Can Spring with Myra Melford (Arabesque, 2001)
- The Long View (Enja, 2002)
- Line on Love (Palmetto, 2003) – with Craig Taborn, Michael Formanek, Billy Drummond
- News on the Rail (Palmetto, 2005)
- Spark! with Myra Melford (Palmetto, 2007)
- Marty Ehrlich Rites Quartet, Things Have Got to Change (Clean Feed, 2009)
- Fables (Tzadik, 2010)
- Marty Ehrlich Rites Quartet, Frog Leg Logic (Clean Feed, 2011)
- Marty Ehrlich Large Ensemble, A Trumpet in the Morning (New World, 2013)
- Trio Exaltation (Clean Feed, 2018)
- Marty Ehrlich Trio Exaltation, This Time (Sunnyside, 2025)
- Cartographies of Flight (Corbett Vs. Dempsey, 2026)
- Circle the Heart with Julius Hemphill (Relative Pitch, 2026) – recorded in 1982
- Open Air: The Complete Saxophone Quartet Compositions of Julius Hemphill (Out of Your Head, 2026)

=== As sideman ===
With Ray Anderson

- Big Band Record (Gramavision, 1994) with the George Gruntz Concert Jazz Band

With Anthony Braxton

- Knitting Factory (Piano/Quartet) 1994, Vol. 1 (Leo, 1994)
- Creative Orchestra (Köln) 1978 (hatART, 1995) – recorded 1978
- Piano Quartet, Yoshi's 1994 (Music & Arts, 1996) – recorded 1994
- Knitting Factory (Piano/Quartet) 1994, Vol. 2 (Leo, 2000) – recorded 1994

With John Carter

- Castles of Ghana (Gramavision, 1986)
- Dance of the Love Ghosts (Gramavision, 1987)
- Fields (Gramavision, 1988)
- Shadows on a Wall (Gramavision, 1989)

With Anthony Coleman

- Lapidation (New World, 2007)

With Don Grolnick

- Nighttown (Blue Note, 1992)

With Julius Hemphill

- Fat Man and the Hard Blues (Black Saint, 1991)
- Five Chord Stud (Black Saint, 1994)
- At Dr. King's Table (New World, 1997)
- The Hard Blues: Live in Lisbon (Cleanfeed, 2004)
- The Boyé Multi-National Crusade for Harmony (New World, 2021)

With Michael Gregory Jackson

- Gifts (Arista Novus, 1979)

With Leroy Jenkins

- Mixed Quintet (Black Saint, 1979)
- Themes & Improvisations on the Blues (CRI, 1994)

With John Lindberg

- Dimension 5 (Black Saint, 1981)

With Myra Melford

- Even the Sounds Shine (Hat ART, 1995)

With Roscoe Mitchell

- Sketches from Bamboo (Moers Music, 1979)

With Bobby Previte

- Weather Clear, Track Fast (Enja, 1991)
- Hue and Cry (Enja, 1993)

== Awards and nominations ==
=== ARIA Music Awards ===
The ARIA Music Awards is an annual awards ceremony that recognises excellence, innovation, and achievement across all genres of Australian music. They commenced in 1987.

Year	Nominee / work	Award	Result	Ref.
2000	The Waiting Game (with Mike Nock)	Best Jazz Album	Nominated	
