= Dick Hawdon =

British Musician (1927–2009)

Richard Hawdon
- Born: August 27, 1927; Leeds, England
- Died: June 23, 2009 (aged 81)
- Known for: Jazz musician, jazz education pioneer
- Notable work: The Golden Striker (arrangement) Kool Kate (composition)
- Style: Trad jazz, modern jazz
- Movement: New Orleans jazz, modern jazz
- Children: Two daughters, one son

Richard Hawdon (August 27, 1927 – June 23, 2009), sometimes billed as Dick or Dickie Hawdon, was a British jazz musician and a pioneer of jazz music education in the United Kingdom. Beginning his career in his hometown of Leeds as a trumpeter, Hawdon played with many jazz ensembles, eventually leading his own quintet playing the double bass. Becoming one of the first instructors of jazz as an academic, Hawdon helped assemble first faculty members for what is now known as the Leeds Conservatoire.

== Early life ==
Born in Leeds to a family of musicians, Hawdon started playing the cello as a child. He studied this instrument for some seven years, the family playing a great deal of chamber music, until his friends introduced him to Jazz. Influenced by recordings like Deep in the Heart of Texas by Woody Heman (with Bing Crosby) he told Kitty Grime he would "sit all night at parties playing one chorus over and over again." In his youth, Hawdon studied agriculture and joined the British Army at the end of World War II, serving until 1948. Hawdon married Barbara Moran in 1950; they produced two daughters (Kate and Janet) and a son (Gavin). When his musical career began as a teenager he was primarily playing cornet and trumpet.

== Jazz musician ==
As early as 1947, Geoff Snowden remembers forming a band called The Chicagoans with, amongst others, Alan Cooper, Diz Disley and Dickie Hawdon which played at The Hotel Metropole in Leeds. While still in his native county, Hawdon also played for the Yorkshire Jazzmen and the Yorkshire Jazz Band. The latter had evolved from Ed O'Donnell's Leeds and Bradford Twin City Washboard Stompers and incorporated Hawdon and Cooper.

In 1950 he moved to London and started a band, while holding down a day job in a bookshop. Members of the band included his friend Dave Stevens along with Alexis Korner, Colin Smith, Denny Coffey and later, Roy Crimmins, and Dave Carey. Thanks to the 'family' of London's jazz aficionados who would meet on the London-Margate Riverboat Shuffle, John Dankworth was present at the opening night of the band's residency at the Studio 51 Club (Later the Ken Colyer Club). In 1951 he joined Chris Barber's New Orleans jazz band. Replacing Ken Colyer, he spent two years in The Christie Brothers' Stompers. Though becoming known as a trad jazz player, he was more and more influenced by Clifford Brown and in 1954 Don Rendell's sextet invited him to join them. However, in this band, in order to blend with Ronnie Ross' baritone, Hawdon switched from the trumpet to the flugelhorn for a year. Only semi-pro until joining the sextet, Hawdon had acquainted himself with the modern style by listening to musicians like Wardell Gray while working in record shops. Once in the band, though Rendell and his pianist Damian Robinson helped him with the more extensive knowledge of chords required, Hawdon told Kitty Grime that it was Jimmy Deuchar who taught him "more in three hours than anyone I'd ever met."

In 1955, he became trumpeter and arranger for Tubby Hayes. The following year saw him recording for Parlophone with The Kirchin Band, in Hawdon's words "a wild band" and "a lot of fun". A recording of the Tubby Hayes orchestra's concert at the Royal Festival Hall was made in February of the same year. In the late 50's he recorded with the Archie Semple Quintet. In 1957, he became lead trumpeter with the John Dankworth Orchestra a post he retained for most of the time until 1964 (Ron Simmonds joined Dankworth between May 61 and December 62, and Leon Calvert took over the lead chair in July of 61.) His own band The Dickie Hawdon Quintet also appeared in support of the Orchestra (1958). On August 18 of the same year, The Christie Brothers' Stompers reformed to record four tracks for Parlophone, the most successful of which was Hawdon's arrangement of The Golden Striker by John Lewis. During this period, he performed (with Dankworth) alongside Louis Armstrong, at the Newport Jazz Festival, and The Duke Ellington Orchestra, also for Parlophone. He plays the trumpet alongside Kenny Wheeler and Gus Galbraith on Dankworth's soundtrack to the 1960 film The Criminal. The same year, his compositions Kool Kate and Tribute to Chauncey were included on Dankworth's album Jazz Routes. Dankworth's orchestra had a Sunday night residency at The Marquee, an evening which included guests such as The Dudley Moore Trio and Benny Goodman.

In the 1960s Hawdon freelanced with Sid Phillips and Harry Gold, among other engagements, including a residency at the Hammersmith Palais. Between 1961 and 1964, he was with the Terry Lightfoot New Orleans Jazzmen and recorded with Columbia. In effect, while playing informally with Chris Barber, he had formed a trad' group Dickie Hawdon's Jazzmen in April 1961 to play at The Manor House, but when the Lightfoot job presented itself he said "I've been trying to make a living out of dixieland jazz for the past twelve years, and this is the first chance I've had in the last eight." In October 1963 he played with the Bill Russo orchestra at the Jazz Jamboree in St Pancras. Although an 'imaginative' fusion with classical music (including a string section) Hawdon was one of the soloists in the 20-piece band. In 1965 he paid hommage to Clifford Brown in a review of the American trumpeter's memorial album, saying that the death of the "Philadelphia phenomenon" had caused a personal sense of bereavement which "far exceeded the regret or sorrow kindled by the death of any other jazzman before or since." Before leaving London, he spent a year in the pit band at the Prince of Wales Theatre, he also played with artists Tony Bennet and Ertha Kitt at The Talk of The Town. Moreover, he toured for 13 weeks with Sarah Vaughan. In 1967, he was playing at the Batley Variety Club, when he was offered a job at the City of Leeds College of Music. However, still attached to the club as musical director, he was on hand to open for Louis Armstrong's All-Stars in June 1968.

In October 1970, he was a member (trumpet and flugel) of the Johnny Harrison Octet, who were booked to play on the BBC early morning show Breakfast Special. A pioneer of jazz education, he became 'Head of Light Music' at the Leeds College in 1972. There he remained until retiring in 1993. All the while, he performed, drawing on his childhood experience by accompanying others on the double bass. Although progressing from "trad" to "modern" to "commercial", the latter because of the impossibility of 'making a decent living out of Jazz' in the late 60's, he confided to Peter Vache: "my heart is still in New Orleans and Chicago in the 20's." However, his collaborations with Dankworth continued to the end of his life.

In May 1974, he was welcomed as a guest star at The Jazz Cellar in Stockport by Eddie Thompson. By 1975, Hawdon was touring with the Dick Hawdon Quintet, featuring William Charleson on sax with Brian Layton on percussion. Hawdon and Layton played with the Tony Faulkner Jazz Orchestra backing up Thad Jones during the 1975 Leeds Music Festival. By 1990 the Quintet was composed of fellow staff members Joe Palin (piano) and Ronnie Bottomley (drums), with Al Wood and Trevor Vincent on Horns.

== Legacy ==
John Dankworth compared Hawdon's range of playing to that of "a young Dizzy Gillespie." At the Newport festival, Dankworth's outfit was introduced as "Englands finest orchestra." Duke Ellington was apparently impressed enough with a live TV broadcast of his Mood Indigo, on which Hawdon played a beautiful solo, that he asked Dankworth for a copy of the arrangement. By 1960, the band's "now successful lead" was billed as Dankworth's "fiery soloist." By the end of 1961 he was considered "the king of the tenor cor."

In the early 1960s The Terry Lightfoot band (with Hawdon on trumpet) was considered to "cover more miles than any other jazz group, working every night and even up to 9 engagements in seven days." Lightfoot's "capture" of Dankworth's lead trumpeter in May 1961 "took the trad' scene by storm." Hawdon's composition (song) Kool Kate was included on EMI's The Best of Johnny Dankworth compilation in 2008. Other compositions include Daves Departure (recorded with Lightfoot) which was released on The British Traditional Jazz Collection Vol 1 CD in 1989 and One For Janet from Dankworth's 1957 album 5 Steps to Dankworth.

The Jazz course at the City of Leeds College of Music, which Hawdon helped institute, was the first of its kind in Europe. Its alumni include musicians like Alan Barnes, who said of Hawdon "He could smell bullshit at 5000 yards." A diehard performer, Hawdon's humility allowed him to continue playing professionally alongside his teaching and administration duties, while (according to his saxophonist) being happy to play "8 pound gigs in pubs with anybody." Despite his adoption of the double bass in 1977 because of "a lack of good local players," Hawdon's horn playing remained intact. Alan Stevens waxed lyrical about his particularly impressive flugel in 1974, saying that the Thompson Trio's interpretation of "Mean to Me" was one of the best he had ever heard. Ewan Mains confirmed that the same was true in 1992.

In an interview with Rolf Ericson in August 1964, when Ericson had remarked on the number of good musicians around, Hawdon replied: "That's the thing, you've got to get yourself into a position where you don't care what it is - you can just go and sit down, knowing very well that you're going to make a damn' good job of it."

== Early discography ==
- 1949 When You Were a Tulip Recorded April 23rd in London for Vogue records (Tempo); with the Yorkshire Jazz Band. (Hawdon plays the cornet).
- 1949 Muskrat Ramble Recorded April 23rd in London for Vogue records (Tempo); with the Yorkshire Jazz Band.
- 1950 Salty Dog / Shine with the Yorkshire Jazz Band.
- 1951 Jubilee Album Volume 1 (Hawdon Plays Trumpet in Chris Barber's Jazz Band).
- 1952 Old Fashioned Love / Fly Cat Boogie (for Melodisc) with The Christie Brothers Stompers.
- 1955 Don Rendell Sextet (EP for Tempo) with Hawdon on trumpet and flugelhorn.
- 1955 Didn't We / Dance Of The Ooblies (with Don Rendell as above).
- 1956 Modern Jazz Scene (tracks 1-7 on trumpets with Tubby Hayes and His Orchestra).
- 1957 After Lights Out (On trumpet with The Tubby Hayes Quintet for Tempo).
- 1957 Little Giant of Jazz (LP with Tubby Hayes).
- 1957 She's The Tops! (on Cleo Laine's LP ).
- 1957 5 Steps to Dankworth (LP includes One for Janet by Hawdon).
- 1958 Jazz At Toad Hall (on Tenor Horn with Ken Moule's Music LP for Decca).
- 1958 Together Again (EP for Parlophone) with The Christie Brothers Stompers.
- 1959 Bundle From Britain LP with Johnny Dankworth and his Orchestra where he plays tenor horn and trumpet.
- 1959 London To Newport he plays trumpet on Johnny Dankworth and his Orchestra's live album at the Newport Festival.
- 1960 Soundtrack Music From 'The Criminal'. Hawdon Plays the trumpet. Johnny Dankworth And His Orchestra. (Columbia)
- 1960 Jazz Routes (LP) Hawdon composed 'Tribute to Chauncey' and 'Kool Kate' for Johnny Dankworth And His Orchestra.
- 1962 Lightfoot At Lansdowne (LP) Hawdon plays trumpet for Terry Lightfoot's Jazzmen (Columbia).
- 1962 Bali Ha'i / Tain't What You Do (Hawdon sings) Terry Lightfoot's New Orleans Jazzmen.
- 1962 Collaboration! by Dankworth And The London Philharmonic Orchestra.
- 1963 What The Dickens! Hawdon plays trumpet, tuba (tenor horn) for Johnny Dankworth, His Orchestra And Guests (Fontana)
- 1964 The Clarinette of Archie Semple (LP) Hawdon plays trumpet on four of the tracks in the Archie Semple Quintet.
