= Andrew White (saxophonist) =

American jazz and R&B musician (1942–2020)

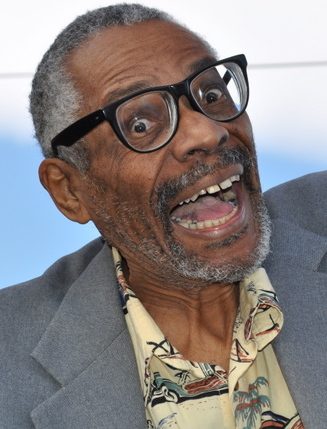
- At home in DC, 2010

Background information
- Born: Andrew Nathaniel White III; September 6, 1942; Washington, D.C., U.S.
- Died: November 11, 2020 (aged 78) Silver Spring, Maryland
- Genres: Hard Bop, jazz, avant-garde
- Occupations: Songwriter, musician, artist, poet, lyricist, composer, record producer
- Instruments: Saxophone, oboe, bass, piano
- Years active: 1960–2020
- Labels: Riverside Records, Andrew's Music

Andrew White (September 6, 1942 – November 11, 2020) was an American jazz and R&B multi-instrumentalist (saxophone, oboe and bass guitar), musicologist and publisher.

== Biography ==
White was born in Washington, D.C., and raised in Nashville, Tennessee, completing his public school education there. He returned to Washington, D.C., in September 1960 to attend Howard University. He graduated in June 1964, cum laude, with a Bachelor of Music degree, majoring in music theory, and with a minor in oboe. After his four years at Howard University, he attended the Paris Conservatory of Music, in Paris, France, on a John Hay Whitney Foundation Fellowship for continued study of the oboe.

As a saxophonist, White appeared on the jazz scene in September 1960, concurrent with his graduation from his studies at Howard University, when he appeared with Washington, D.C.'s J.F.K. Quintet (1961–63) which recorded two albums for the Riverside label. He later appeared with Kenny Clarke (1965), Otis Redding (1967), McCoy Tyner (1970), Elvin Jones (1980–81), Beaver Harris (1983), The Julius Hemphill Saxophone Sextet (1987), 'The Six Winds' a Dutch saxophone sextet (1999), and on his own Andrew White's ZORROSAX ALLSTARS, saxophone sextet (2002), and hundreds of personal solo appearances worldwide. These include solo performances at New York City’s Carnegie Hall (1974 and 1975), Lincoln Center (1990 and 1995), Town Hall (1975), The Kennedy Center, in Washington, D.C. (1970 through 2005), Paris, France’s Theatre du Chatelet (1980), La Vila (1995), and a 1994 solo tour of seven French cities.

As composer, publisher, conductor and saxophone soloist, White was presented at the Mass Double Reed Orchestra of 300 Double Reed Instruments at the 32nd Annual Convention of the International Double Reed Society, in June 2003, at the University of North Carolina, at Greensboro, North Carolina.

The ten-year career of White as oboist also included study at Tanglewood, Massachusetts, in the summers of 1963 and 1966, The Dartmouth Community Orchestra, at Dartmouth College, study and performance of contemporary music at The Center Of Creative And Performing Arts, at the State University of New York, at Buffalo, on two Rockefeller Foundation Fellowships, 1965–1967, and his final position as principal oboist with the American Ballet Theatre, from January 1968 through August 1970.

As an electric bassist, White's most viable career spanned the decade 1966-1976. He was primarily the electric bassist with the singer-songwriter Stevie Wonder, from 1968 through August 1970, concurrent with his position as oboist with the American Ballet Theatre Orchestra. He was the principal electric bassist with the popular singing group The 5th Dimension, from 1970 through 1976. Among his most memorable recordings as an electric bassist is with Weather Report's album, Sweetnighter, recorded in January 1973, on Columbia Records.

On May 14, 2006, White was the 2006 Gold Medal Honoree of the French Society of Arts, Sciences, and Letters, in Paris. He shares the award with past honorees including violinist-conductor Lord Yehudi Menuhin, trumpeter, Maurice André, composer Olivier Messiaen, and scientist-Nobel Prize laureate, Albert Schweitzer. White was the only American to receive this award for the year 2006.

=== Academic ===
As a musicologist, White published many musicological offerings through his music publishing firm, Andrew’s Music, including The Works of John Coltrane, Vols. 1 though 14: 701 transcriptions of John Coltrane’s Improvisations. Andrew White "thoroughly and meticulously transcribed, encyclopeiasized, catalogued, documented, and self-published the most significant linguistic contributor to the jazz language in the history of jazz, John Coltrane," wrote Peter Occiogrosso, in The Soho News, New York (May 15, 1975). White's book on the music of John Coltrane, Trane and Me (1981), was also published in this manner.

On November 15, 2007, White was honored as a saxophonist by Howard University with the Benny Golson Master Award. He was presented in ceremony and concert, featuring the Howard University Jazz Ensemble (Fred Irby, Director), at Howard University’s Andrew Rankin Chapel.

== Death ==
White died on November 11, 2020, at an assisted-living facility in Silver Spring, Maryland.

== Discography ==
=== As leader ===
Title	Year	Series	Label	No.
Andrew Nathaniel White III	1971		Andrew's Music	AM-1
Live at the New Thing in Washington D.C.	1973		Andrew's Music	AM-2
Live in Bucharest	1973		Andrew's Music	AM-3
Who Got de Funk?	1973		Andrew's Music	AM-4
Passion Flower	1974		Andrew's Music	AM-5
Songs for a French Lady	1974		Andrew's Music	AM-6
Theme	1974		Andrew's Music	AM-7
Live at the Foolery in Washington D.C. Vol. One	1974	Live at the Foolery	Andrew's Music	AM-8
Live at the Foolery in Washington D.C. Vol. Two	1974	Live at the Foolery	Andrew's Music	AM-9
Live at the Foolery in Washington D.C. Vol. Three	1974	Live at the Foolery	Andrew's Music	AM-10
Live at the Foolery in Washington D.C. Vol. Four	1974	Live at the Foolery	Andrew's Music	AM-11
Live at the Foolery in Washington D.C. Vol. Five	1974	Live at the Foolery	Andrew's Music	AM-12
Live at the Foolery in Washington D.C. Vol. Six	1974	Live at the Foolery	Andrew's Music	AM-13
Collage	1975		Andrew's Music	AM-14
Marathon '75 Vol. 1	1975	Marathon 1975	Andrew's Music	AM-15
Marathon '75 Vol. 2	1975	Marathon 1975	Andrew's Music	AM-16
Marathon '75 Vol. 3	1975	Marathon 1975	Andrew's Music	AM-17
Marathon '75 Vol. 4	1975	Marathon 1975	Andrew's Music	AM-18
Marathon '75 Vol. 5	1975	Marathon 1975	Andrew's Music	AM-19
Marathon '75 Vol. 6	1975	Marathon 1975	Andrew's Music	AM-20
Marathon '75 Vol. 7	1975	Marathon 1975	Andrew's Music	AM-21
Marathon '75 Vol. 8	1975	Marathon 1975	Andrew's Music	AM-22
Marathon '75 Vol. 9	1975	Marathon 1975	Andrew's Music	AM-23
Spotts, Maxine and Brown	1976	De Here We is Again	Andrew's Music	AM-24
Countdown	1976	De Here We is Again	Andrew's Music	AM-25
Red Top	1976	De Here We is Again	Andrew's Music	AM-26
Trinkle, Trinkle	1976	De Here We is Again	Andrew's Music	AM-27
Ebony Glaze	1976	De Here We is Again	Andrew's Music	AM-28
Miss Ann	1976	De Here We is Again	Andrew's Music	AM-29
Seven Giant Steps for Coltrane	1976	De Here We is Again	Andrew's Music	AM-30
Live in New York Vol. One	1977	Loft Jazz	Andrew's Music	AM-31
Live in New York Vol. Two	1977	Loft Jazz	Andrew's Music	AM-32
Bionic Saxophone	1978	Loft Jazz	Andrew's Music	AM-33
Saxophonitis	1979	Loft Jazz	Andrew's Music	AM-34
The Coltrane Interviews Volume One	1979	The Coltrane Interviews	Andrew's Music	AM-35
The Coltrane Interviews Volume Two	1979	The Coltrane Interviews	Andrew's Music	AM-36
Fonk Update	1979	Weekend at the One Step	Andrew's Music	AM-37
I Love Japan	1979	Weekend at the One Step	Andrew's Music	AM-38
Have Band Will Travel	1979	Weekend at the One Step	Andrew's Music	AM-39
Petite Suite Francaise	1982		Andrew's Music	AM-40
Seven More Giant Steps For Coltrane	1982		Andrew's Music	AMC-41
Profile	1984		Andrew's Music	AM-42
Far Out Flatulence	1988		Andrew's Music	AMC-43
Andrew's Easy Listening Music Cassette	1989		Andrew's Music	AMC-44
Nouveau Fonk	1999	Gigtime 2000	Andrew's Music	AMCD-45
Andrew's Music Theme	1999	Gigtime 2000	Andrew's Music	AMCD-46
Everybody Loves the Sugar	1999	Gigtime 2000	Andrew's Music	AMCD-47
Keep on Dancin', Baby!	1999	Gigtime 2000	Andrew's Music	AMCD-48
Fat Backin’ Vol. 1	2016	Fat Backin’	Andrew's Music	AMCD-50
Fat Backin’ Vol. 2	2016	Fat Backin’	Andrew's Music	AMCD-51
Fat Backin’ Vol. 3	2016	Fat Backin’	Andrew's Music	AMCD-52
Fat Backin’ Vol. 4	2016	Fat Backin’	Andrew's Music	AMCD-53
Fat Backin’ Vol. 5	2016	Fat Backin’	Andrew's Music	AMCD-54
Fat Backin’ Vol. 6	2016	Fat Backin’	Andrew's Music	AMCD-55
Fat Backin’ Vol. 7	2016	Fat Backin’	Andrew's Music	AMCD-56
Fat Backin’ Vol. 8	2016	Fat Backin’	Andrew's Music	AMCD-57
7 New York Bootlegs	2015		Andrew's Music	AMCD-58
Saxophonitis/Bionic Saxophone	2016	Saxophonitis Wondersax	Andrew's Music	AMCD-59
Passion Flower/Who Got De Funk	2016	Saxophonitis Wondersax	Andrew's Music	AMCD-60
Fonk Update/Miss Ann	2016	Saxophonitis Wondersax	Andrew's Music	AMCD-61
I Love Japan/Have Band Will Travel	2016	Saxophonitis Wondersax	Andrew's Music	AMCD-62
Super Bonus Sampler	2016	Saxophonitis Wondersax	Andrew's Music	AMCD-63
Giant Steps Live -- All Around The World	2017		Andrew's Music	AMCD-64
Mothballs	2019	M M and M	Andrew's Music	AMCD-65
Magical Genius	2019	M M and M	Andrew's Music	AMCD-66
Bio-Me	2019	M M and M	Andrew's Music	AMCD-67
Theme Fantasia	2019		Andrew's Music	AMCD-68
Candid Cassettes Vol. 1	1983		Andrew's Music	-
Candid Cassettes Vol. 2	1983		Andrew's Music	-

=== As sideman ===
With Julius Hemphill

- Fat Man and the Hard Blues (Black Saint, 1991)
- Five Chord Stud (Black Saint, 1994)
- At Dr. King's Table (1997)
- The Hard Blues (Clean Feed, 2004)

With McCoy Tyner

- Asante (Blue Note, 1974)
- Cosmos (Blue Note, 1976)

With Weather Report

- I Sing the Body Electric (Columbia, 1972)
- Sweetnighter (Columbia, 1973)
- Forecast: Tomorrow (Columbia, 2006)

With others

- The 5th Dimension, Live!! (Bell, 1971)
- Beaver Harris, Beaver Is My Name (Timeless, 1987)
- Elvin Jones, Soul Train (Denon, 1980)
- Lloyd McNeill, Washington Suite (ASHA, 1970)
- Marion Williams, Standing Here Wondering Which Way to Go (Atlantic, 1971)
