= Live from the New Music Cafe =

Live album by Julius Hemphill Trio
- Released: 1992
- Recorded: September 27, 1991
- Venue: New Music Cafe, New York City
- Genre: Free jazz
- Length: 1:09:58
- Label: Music & Arts; CD-731
- Producer: Cynthia B. Herbst

Julius Hemphill chronology
Fat Man and the Hard Blues (1991)	Live from the New Music Cafe (1992)	Oakland Duets (1993)

Live from the New Music Cafe is a live album by the Julius Hemphill Trio, led by saxophonist Hemphill, and featuring cellist Abdul Wadud and drummer Joe Bonadio. It was recorded on September 27, 1991, at the New Music Cafe in New York City, and was released by Music & Arts in 1992.

== Reception ==
Professional ratings
Review scores
Source	Rating
AllMusic	3/5 stars
MusicHound Jazz: The Essential Album Guide	3/5 stars
The Penguin Guide to Jazz	3/4 stars
The Rolling Stone Jazz & Blues Album Guide	3.5/5 stars
The Virgin Encyclopedia of Jazz	3/5 stars

In a review for AllMusic, Brian Olewnick wrote: "It's a loose set ranging from subtly structured pieces to hard drivers like his classic 'Dogon AD,' generally featuring nice interplay between the leader's sinuous alto and soprano and Wadud's cello, the two musicians having become, at this point, virtual extensions of each other."

The authors of The Penguin Guide to Jazz Recordings stated: "Bonadio isn't the most virtuosic drummer, but he's right for this music precisely because he doesn't want to plug every hole, fill every silence with sound."

== Track listing ==
Composed by Julius Hemphill.

1. "Sixteen" – 12:39
2. "Testament No. 5" – 9:54
3. "Fifteen" – 12:00
4. "Dogon A.D." – 13:00
5. "Georgia Blue" – 6:14
6. "Bordertown" – 9:10
7. "Floppy" – 6:30

== Personnel ==
- Julius Hemphill – alto saxophone, soprano saxophone
- Abdul Wadud – cello
- Joe Bonadio – drums, percussion
