= Piano Quartet, Yoshi's 1994 =

Live album by Anthony Braxton
- Released: 1996
- Recorded: June 15–19, 1994
- Venue: Yoshi's, Oakland, CA
- Genre: Jazz
- Length: 309:34
- Label: Music & Arts; CD 849

Anthony Braxton chronology
Composition No. 175 / Composition No. 126: Trillium Dialogues M (1994)	Piano Quartet, Yoshi's 1994 (1996)	Knitting Factory (Piano/Quartet) 1994, Vol. 1 (1994)

Piano Quartet, Yoshi's 1994 is a live album by composer and pianist Anthony Braxton with a quartet, recorded at the Yoshi's in 1994 and released on the Music & Arts label in 1996 as a four-CD box set.

== Reception ==
Professional ratings
Review scores
Source	Rating
AllMusic	4/5 stars
The Penguin Guide to Jazz Recordings	3/4 stars

The Allmusic review by Thom Jurek stated "Piano Quartet, Yoshi's 1994 is a four-CD collection focusing on the live dates Anthony Braxton's short-lived piano quartet played at Yoshi's Nitespot in Oakland, CA, in 1994. They mark the debut of Anthony Braxton as a pianist in a live jazz quartet setting, and were savaged fairly thoroughly by jazz critics when first issued. ... those critiques were motivated, it seems, not by the actual merits (or lack thereof) of Braxton's ability to play the instrument, but by the same insensitivity, meanness of spirit, and complete lack of understanding that has followed him his entire career ... this band never got to realize its full potential because of the various commitments and restless natures of its two principals. Nonetheless, this collection is more than a document; it is a development not only in Braxton's ever evolving and often confounding esthetic, but in the development of jazz itself as an interconnected, meta-textual music whose roots and branches are more deeply embedded into one another than we previously believed. The piano quartet has made a first step in dragging the roots out to be more closely examined in a driving, singing, swinging way".

== Track listing ==
Disc one

1. "Exotica" (John Coltrane) – 13:16
2. "Woody 'n' You" (Dizzy Gillespie) – 8:14
3. "Soul Eyes" (Mal Waldron) – 15:54
4. "Bluesette" (Toots Thielemans) – 12:45
5. "Stablemates" (Benny Golson) – 9:57
6. "Marionette" (Billy Bauer) – 11:32
7. "Cherokee" (Ray Noble) – 5:03

Disc two

1. "The Duke" (Dave Brubeck) – 9:22
2. "Nica's Dream" (Horace Silver) – 13:18
3. "Lament" (J. J. Johnson) – 10:50
4. "Pannonica" (Thelonious Monk) – 10:41
5. "Star Eyes" (Gene de Paul, Don Raye) – 8:47
6. "I Remember You" (Victor Schertzinger, Johnny Mercer) – 12:37
7. "Along Came Betty" (Golson) – 9:40

Disc three'

1. "Line for Lyons" (Gerry Mulligan) – 14:12
2. "Joy Spring" (Clifford Brown) – 10:09
3. "Lush Life" (Billy Strayhorn) – 16:22
4. "Jinrikisha" (Joe Henderson) – 13:38
5. "What's New?" (Bob Haggart, Johnny Burke) – 15:14
6. "Minority" (Gigi Gryce) – 9:03

Disc four

1. "Nardis" (Miles Davis) – 13:49
2. "Booker's Waltz" (Eric Dolphy) – 8:58
3. "Body and Soul" (Johnny Green, Frank Eyton, Edward Heyman, Robert Sour) – 7:45
4. "Just Friends" (John Klenner, Sam M. Lewis) – 13:36
5. "Afternoon in Paris" (John Lewis) – 11:22
6. "I Can't Get Started" (Vernon Duke, Ira Gershwin) – 15:01
7. "Early Autumn" (Ralph Burns, Woody Herman, Johnny Mercer) – 8:29

== Personnel ==
- Anthony Braxton – piano
- Marty Ehrlich – alto saxophone, soprano saxophone, clarinet
- Joe Fonda – bass
- Arthur Fuller – percussion
