= Fat Man and the Hard Blues =

Studio album by Julius Hemphill
- Released: 1991
- Recorded: July 15 & 16, 1991
- Genre: Jazz
- Length: 55:09
- Label: Black Saint
- Producer: Julius Hemphill

Julius Hemphill chronology
Julius Hemphill Big Band (1988)	Fat Man and the Hard Blues (1991)	Live from the New Music Cafe (1992)

Fat Man and the Hard Blues is an album by jazz saxophonist Julius Hemphill recorded in 1991 for the Italian Black Saint label.

== Reception ==
Professional ratings
Review scores
Source	Rating
AllMusic	5/5 stars
The Encyclopedia of Popular Music	4/5 stars
The Penguin Guide to Jazz Recordings	3.5/4 stars
The Rolling Stone Jazz & Blues Album Guide	4/5 stars

The editors of AllMusic awarded the album 5 stars, and reviewer Scott Yanow stated: "These miniatures (all under seven minutes) are most notable for their fresh melodies, logical arrangements, and spirited ensembles".

The authors of The Penguin Guide to Jazz Recordings called the album "both an intelligent continuation of the last decade's work and a challenging new departure."

== Track listing ==
All compositions by Julius Hemphill

1. "Otis' Groove" - 3:00
2. "Lenny" - 2:33
3. "Floppy" - 2:50
4. "Opening" - 4:07
5. "Headlines" - 2:59
6. "Four Saints" - 2:45
7. "Fat Man" - 5:16
8. "Glide" - 4:32
9. "Tendrils" - 6:18
10. "Anchorman" - 4:41
11. "Untitled" - 5:10
12. "Three-Step" - 2:00
13. "The Answer" - 2:18
14. "The Hard Blues" - 6:40
- Recorded at Sear Sound in New York City on June 15 & 16, 1991

== Personnel ==
- Julius Hemphill - alto saxophone
- Marty Ehrlich - soprano saxophone, alto saxophone, flute
- Carl Grubbs - soprano saxophone, alto saxophone
- James Carter - tenor saxophone
- Andrew White - tenor saxophone
- Sam Furnace - baritone saxophone, flute
