= Yorkshire Jazz Band =

The Yorkshire Jazz Band included founder members Diz Disley and clarinettist Alan Cooper, both fellow students of Leeds College of Art. In 1949, their members were Dick Hawdon (c), Arthur Rigg (p), Eddie O'Donnell (tb), Alan Cooper (cl), Bob Barclay (tuba), Eddie Encell (bio), and Tiny Lancaster (drums). They regularly played at the Studio 20 jazz club on New Briggate, Leeds in the 1950s, and were often photographed by Terry Cryer.

== Discography ==
- "St. Louis Blues" (William Christopher Handy) / "Weary Blues" (Artie Matthews), Tempo - Division of Vogue Records, recorded in London on 18 June 1949
- "Big Chief Battle Axe" (Allen) / "Muskrat Ramble" (Kid Ory) TEMPO A 17, Tempo - recorded in London on 23 April 1949
