= Oakland Duets =

Live album by Julius Hemphill and Abdul Wadud
- Released: 1993
- Recorded: November 13 and 14, 1992
- Venue: Oakland Museum, Oakland, California
- Genre: Free jazz
- Length: 1:01:36
- Label: Music & Arts; CD-791

Julius Hemphill chronology
Live from the New Music Cafe (1992)	Oakland Duets (1993)	Five Chord Stud (1993)

Abdul Wadud chronology
Trio 2 (1990)	Oakland Duets (1993)

Oakland Duets is a live album by saxophonist Julius Hemphill and cellist Abdul Wadud. It was recorded at the Oakland Museum in Oakland, California, on November 13 and 14, 1992, and was released by Music & Arts in 1993.

== Reception ==
Professional ratings
Review scores
Source	Rating
AllMusic	4.5/5 stars
The Virgin Encyclopedia of Jazz	3/5 stars
The Encyclopedia of Popular Music	3/5 stars
The Rolling Stone Jazz & Blues Album Guide	4/5 stars
MusicHound Jazz: The Essential Album Guide	3.5/5 stars
The Penguin Guide to Jazz	3/4 stars

In a review for AllMusic, Thom Jurek called the album "the absolute statement from these two artists who played literally hundreds of gigs but recorded together only six times," and wrote: "the disc... is a stomp of one color and style after another, painting a dizzying yet soulful tapestry of musical prowess and emotional honesty lacquered generously with the blackest of blues and the greasiest funky soul you've ever heard in an improv setting."

Author Gary Giddins described the album as "exuberant," and stated that the musicians "rouse each other in colloquies of impressive concentration and rare candor."

== Track listing ==
1. "Me & Wadud, Part I" (Hemphill) – 9:41
2. "'C'" (Hemphill) – 9:24
3. "Sigure" (Wadud) – 16:10
4. "Me & Wadud, Part II" (Hemphill) – 9:41
5. "For Billie" (Hemphill) – 8:29
6. "Dream" (Hemphill) – 7:49

== Personnel ==
- Julius Hemphill – saxophone
- Abdul Wadud – cello
