= Chile New York =

Chile New York: Sound Environment

Live album by Julius Hemphill and Warren Smith
- Released: 1998
- Recorded: May 1, 1980
- Venue: 42nd Street, New York City
- Genre: Free improvisation
- Length: 1:11:54
- Label: Black Saint; 120146-2
- Producer: Julius Hemphill

Julius Hemphill chronology
Five Chord Stud (1993)	Chile New York: Sound Environment (1998)	Live at Kassiopeia (2011)

Chile New York: Sound Environment is a live album by saxophonist Julius Hemphill and percussionist Warren Smith. The music was designed as an audio backdrop for a sculpture and poetry installation by Jeff Schlanger and James Scully, the subject of which was the 1973 overthrow of the democratic government in Santiago, Chile. The album was recorded in New York City on May 1, 1980, and was released by the Black Saint label in 1998, three years after Hemphill's death.

== Reception ==
Professional ratings
Review scores
Source	Rating
AllMusic	4/5 stars
The Penguin Guide to Jazz	3/4 stars
Tom Hull – on the Web	B+

In a review for AllMusic, Don Snowden wrote: "Chile New York always sustains interest because these two musicians are fully attuned to each other's nuances, and fans of Hemphill's solo sax excursions or duo/trio recordings will almost certainly enjoy it."

The authors of The Penguin Guide to Jazz Recordings stated: "the music stands somewhat apart from its occasion, and one doesn't need to know much about the programme or its setting to appreciate Hemphill's slow, meditative themes... Smith... provides the scampering backgrounds, redolent of rat alleys and paper-strewn streets, through which Julius walks, alone and troubled."

Texas Monthly's John Morthland commented: "Smith's multiple instruments paint a spacious soundscape, adding a level of depth not often present on duets, while Hemphill's spirited blowing skirmishes the craggy scenery with stark originality."

== Track listing ==
Composed by Julius Hemphill.

1. "One" – 21:21
2. "Two" – 22:15
3. "Three" – 19:46
4. "Four" – 2:01
5. "Five" – 1:41
6. "Six" – 1:37
7. "Seven" – 3:13

== Personnel ==
- Julius Hemphill – alto saxophone, tenor saxophone, flute, voice
- Warren Smith – percussion
