= Composition No. 175 / Composition No. 126: Trillium Dialogues M =

Live album by Anthony Braxton with the Creative Jazz Orchestra
- Released: 2006
- Recorded: May 15, 1994
- Venue: London Jazz Festival, Sadler's Wells Theatre
- Genre: Jazz
- Length: 151:00
- Label: Leo; CD LR 453/454
- Producer: Leo Feigin

Anthony Braxton chronology
Duet: Live at Merkin Hall (1994)	Composition No. 175 / Composition No. 126: Trillium Dialogues M (2006)	Piano Quartet, Yoshi's 1994 (1994)

Composition No. 175 / Composition No. 126: Trillium Dialogues M is a live album by composer and pianist Anthony Braxton with the Creative Jazz Orchestra, performing two extended compositions recorded at the London Jazz Festival in 1994 and released on the Leo label.

== Reception ==
Professional ratings
Review scores
Source	Rating
AllMusic	4/5 stars
All About Jazz	2.5/5 stars

The AllMusic review by arwulf arwulf stated "Both works are outgrowths of the composer's Trillium opera project, which was first defined a full decade before this recording was made. ... Structurally and texturally, the music at times seems closely aligned with what Braxton refers to as the Post-Webern Continuum, in the selection and configuration of tones and the use of silence as a structural element. The keyboard improvisations of Roy Powell are especially intriguing, as is the interplay among the instrumentalists behind the declamatory vocals. "Composition 175", which occupies the first disc in the set and features two vocalists rather than four, illustrates a later stage in the Trillium development. The opportunity to experience Anthony Braxton's approach to opera is most auspicious". On All About Jazz, John Eyles noted "despite the orchestra's name, this music is most definitely not jazz. It is avant-garde opera. The voices dominate and the orchestra rarely does more than accompany them. Both compositions have little in the way of conventional story or plot. Nor do they have any memorable melodies, in the style of classical Italian or German operas. ... On this evidence, Trillium is dense, wordy and rather repetitive. And as with much of Braxton's music, it makes a kind of sense when considered in the context of his other work. Each playing of this album reveals new things to enjoy and savour. ... I strongly suspect that one would need to see these operas performed on stage to fully appreciate the music. Nonetheless, as recorded music it does have a certain fascination. But jazz it isn't".

== Track listing ==
All compositions by Anthony Braxton

Disc One:

1. "Composition No.. 175" – 43:29

Disc Two:

1. "Composition No. 126: Act I" – 33:50
2. "Composition No. 126: Act II" – 14:35

== Personnel ==
- Creative Jazz Orchestra
  - Nick Purnell – artistic director
  - Mark White, Richard Iles – trumpet
  - Chris Bridges – trombone
  - Robin Hayward – tuba
  - Iain Dixon, Jim Hunt, Andy Schofield – reeds
  - Susanna Gibbon, Steve Wilkie – violin
  - Sara Swain – viola
  - Andrew Wardale – cello
  - Jackie Perkins, Lesley Davies, Paul Phoenix, Paul McNamara – vocals
  - Philippa Tunnell – harp
  - Mike Walker – guitar
  - Roy Powell – keyboards
  - Nikki Iles – piano
  - Gary Culshaw – bass
  - Eryl Roberts – drums
  - Liz Gilliver – tuned percussion
