= Self Determination Music =

Studio album by John Carter and Bobby Bradford
- Released: 1970
- Recorded: 1970
- Genre: Jazz
- Length: 44:01
- Label: Flying Dutchman; FDS 128
- Producer: John Carter, Bobby Bradford

John Carter and Bobby Bradford chronology
Seeking (1969)	Self Determination Music (1970)	Secrets (1971)

Self Determination Music is an album by American jazz saxophonist John Carter and trumpeter Bobby Bradford released by the Flying Dutchman label in 1970.

Professional ratings
Review scores
Source	Rating
AllMusic	4/5 stars

== Track listing ==
All compositions by John Carter except where noted

1. "The Sunday Afternoon Jazz Blues Society" − 5:50
2. "The Eye of the Storm" (Bobby Bradford) − 15:21
3. "Loneliness" − 9:10
4. "Encounter" − 13:27

== Personnel ==
- John Carter − alto saxophone, tenor saxophone, clarinet
- Bobby Bradford − cornet
- Henry Franklin, Tom Williamson − bass
- Bruz Freeman − drums
