= Flight for Four =

Studio album by John Carter & Bobby Bradford Quartet
- Released: 1969
- Recorded: January 3, 1969
- Studio: Los Angeles
- Genre: Jazz
- Length: 40:31
- Label: Flying Dutchman; FDS 108
- Producer: Bob Thiele

John Carter & Bobby Bradford Quartet chronology
Flight for Four (1969)	Seeking (1969)

Flight for Four is an album by American jazz saxophonist John Carter and trumpeter Bobby Bradford recorded in 1969 and released by the Flying Dutchman label.

Professional ratings
Review scores
Source	Rating
AllMusic	4/5 stars

== Track listing ==
All compositions by John Carter except where noted

1. "Call to the Festival" − 9:30
2. "The Second Set" − 8:42
3. "Woman" (Bobby Bradford) − 7:10
4. "Abstractions for Three Lovers" − 6:39
5. "Domino" − 7:57

== Personnel ==
- John Carter − alto saxophone, tenor saxophone, clarinet
- Bobby Bradford − trumpet
- Tom Williamson − bass
- Buzz Freeman − drums
