= Bobby Bradford =

American jazz musician, bandleader, and composer (born 1934)

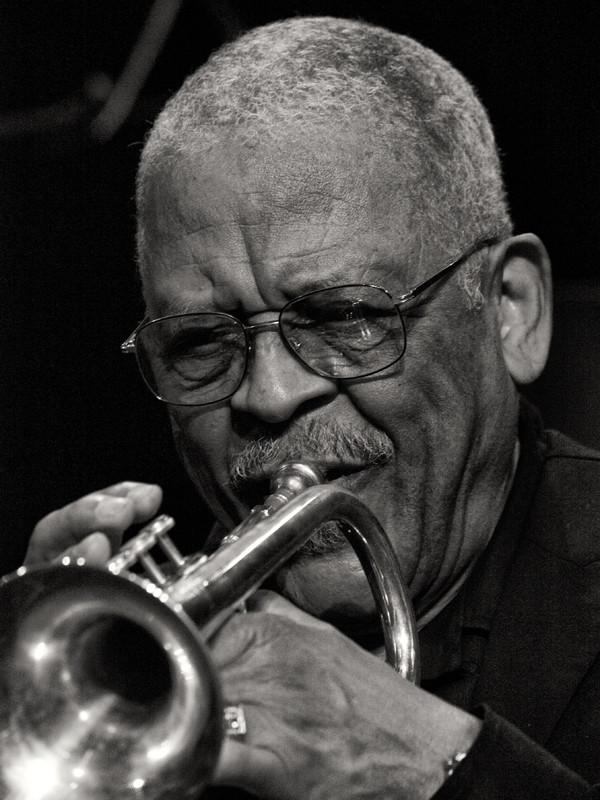
- Bradford at the Moers Festival in 2008

Background information
- Born: Bobby Lee Bradford; July 19, 1934 (age 91); Cleveland, Mississippi, U.S.
- Origin: Dallas, Texas
- Genres: Jazz
- Occupations: Musician, composer
- Instruments: Cornet, trumpet

Bobby Lee Bradford (born July 19, 1934) is an American jazz trumpeter, cornetist, bandleader, and composer. In addition to his solo work, Bradford is noted for his work with John Carter, Vinny Golia and Ornette Coleman. In October 2009, Bradford became the second recipient of the Festival of New Trumpet Music's Award of Recognition. He taught at Pomona College for 44 years.

== Biography ==
Bobby Lee Bradford's life began in Mississippi; he and his family then moved to Dallas, Texas, in 1946. He moved to Los Angeles, California, in 1953 where he reunited with Ornette Coleman, whom he had previously known in Texas. Bradford subsequently joined Coleman's ensemble, but was drafted into the U.S. Air Force and replaced by Don Cherry.

After playing in military bands from late 1954 to late 1958, he rejoined Coleman's quartet from 1961 to 1963, which infrequently performed in public, but was indeed recorded under Coleman's Atlantic contract. These tapes were among those many destroyed in the Great Atlantic Vault Fire. Freddie Hubbard acted as Bradford's replacement upon his departure to return to the West Coast and pursue further studies. Bradford soon began a long-running and relatively well-documented association with the clarinetist John Carter, a pairing that brought both increased exposure at international festivals (though the records remain scantily available, when one excludes web rips and bootlegs). Following Carter's death in 1991, Bradford fronted his own ensemble known as The Mo'tet, with which he has continued to perform since. He is the father of jazz vocalist Carmen Bradford.

He holds a B.M. degree from Huston–Tillotson College (now Huston–Tillotson University) in Austin, Texas.

In addition to Coleman, Bradford has performed with Eric Dolphy, Leon "Ndugu" Chancler, Ingebrigt Håker-Flaten, Bob Stewart, Charlie Haden, George Lewis (trombone), James Newton, Frode Gjerstad, Vinny Golia, Paal Nilssen-Love, and David Murray, who was previously a student of his in the 1970s.

He was a lecturer at Pomona College in Claremont, California, where he taught the history of jazz and led the school's jazz ensemble. After 44 years at the college, he retired in June 2021.

Bradford was among those who lost their Altadena, California homes in the Eaton Fire of January 2025.

== Discography ==
=== As leader ===
- Flight for Four (Flying Dutchman, 1969)
- Seeking with New Art Jazz Ensemble (Revelation, 1969)
- Self Determination Music with John Carter (Flying Dutchman, 1970)
- Secrets with John Carter (Revelation, 1973)
- Bobby Bradford with John Stevens and the Spontaneous Music Ensemble (Freedom/Intercord, 1974)
- Love's Dream (Emanem, 1974)
- Vols. 1 & 2 with John Stevens (Nessa, 1980, 1981)
- Lost in L.A. (Soul Note, 1984)
- Live One Night Stand (Soul Note, 1988)
- Comin' On with John Carter (hat ART, 1989)
- West Coast Hot with John Carter (BMG/Novus/RCA 1991)
- Tandem 1 with John Carter (Emanem, 1996)
- Tandem 2 with John Carter (Emanem, 1996)
- Purple Gums with Francis Wong & William Roper (Asian Improv, 2003)
- Mo' Betta Butta with Francis Wong & William Roper (Asian Improv, 2007)
- Reknes with Frode Gjerstad (Circulasione Totale, 2009)
- Varistar with Tom Heasley (Full Bleed Music, 2009)
- Live in LA with Mark Dresser (Clean Feed, 2011)
- Dragon with Frode Gjerstad, (PNL, 2012)
- Kampen with Frode Gjerstad, (NoBusiness, 2012)
- Silver Cornet with Frode Gjerstad (Nessa, 2014)
- No U-Turn Live in Pasadena 1975 with John Carter (Dark Tree, 2015)
- The Delaware River with Frode Gjerstad (NoBusiness, 2015)
- Live at the Open Gate with Hafez Modirzadeh (NoBusiness, 2016)
- Live at the Magic Triangle with Hafez Modirzadeh (NoBusiness, 2017)
- Live at the Blue Whale with Hafez Modirzadeh (NoBusiness, 2018)
- Blue Cat with Frode Gjerstad (NoBusiness, 2019)

With Circulasione Totale Orchestra

- Open Port (Circulasione Totale, 2008)
- Bandwidth (Rune Grammofon, 2009)
- PhilaOslo (Circulasione Totale, 2011)

=== As sideman ===
With John Carter

- Variations (Moers Music, 1979)
- Night Fire (Black Saint, 1981)
- Dauwhe (Black Saint, 1982)
- Castles of Ghana (Gramavision, 1986)
- Dance of the Love Ghosts (Gramavision, 1987)
- Fields (Gramavision, 1988)
- Shadows On a Wall (Gramavision, 1989)

With Vinny Golia

- Compositions for Large Ensemble (Nine Winds, 1982)
- Lineage (Nine Winds, 1998)
- Sfumato (Clean Feed, 2005)
- Take Your Time (Relative Pitch, 2011)
- Live at the Century City Playhouse Los Angeles 1979 (Dark Tree, 2017)

With David Murray

- Murray's Steps (Black Saint, 1983)
- Death of a Sideman (DIW, 1992)
- MX (Red Baron, 1992)
- Be My Monster Love (Motéma, 2013)

With others

- Nels Cline, New Monastery (Cryptogramophone, 2006)
- Ornette Coleman, Science Fiction (Columbia, 1972)
- Ornette Coleman, Broken Shadows (Columbia, 1982)
- Ornette Coleman, The Complete Science Fiction Sessions (Columbia, 2000)
- Jayne Cortez, Borders of Disorderly Time (Bola Press, 2003)
- Frode Gjerstad, Ikosa Mura (Cadence, 1998)
- Frode Gjerstad, Through the Woods (CIMP, 1998)
- Rich Halley, The Blue Rims (Louie, 2003)
- Rich Halley, Live at the Penofin Jazz Festival (Pine Eagle, 2010)
- Roberto Miranda's Home Music Ensemble, Live at Bing Theatre - Los Angeles, 1985 (Dark Tree, 2021)
- John Rapson, Dances and Orations (Music & Arts, 1996)
- John Rapson, Water and Blood (Nine Winds, 2001)
- Bob Thiele, Head Start (Flying Dutchman, 1969)

== Bibliography ==
- Isoardi, Steven L. (2006). The Dark Tree: Jazz and the Community Arts in Los Angeles. The George Gund Foundation Book in African American Studies. Berkeley: University of California Press. ISBN 0-520-24591-1
- Litweiler, John (1990). The Freedom Principle: Jazz After 1958. New York: Da Capo Press. ISBN 0-306-80377-1
- Dailey, Raleigh. Folklore, Composition, and Free Jazz: The Life and Music of John Carter. Ph.D. dissertation; University of Kentucky, 2007.
