= Leeds Conservatoire =

Music conservatoire in Leeds, England

Coordinates: 53°47′50″N 1°31′58″W

- Former names: Leeds Music Centre (1965–1971), City of Leeds College of Music (1971–1997), Leeds College of Music (1997–2020)
- Type: Conservatoire
- Established: 1965; 61 years ago
- Affiliations: Conservatoires UK; European Association of Conservatoires; Luminate Education Group
- Principal: Joe Wilson
- Students: 1500
- Location: 3 Quarry Hill, Leeds LS2 7PD, England
- Colours: Blue
- Website: www.leedsconservatoire.ac.uk

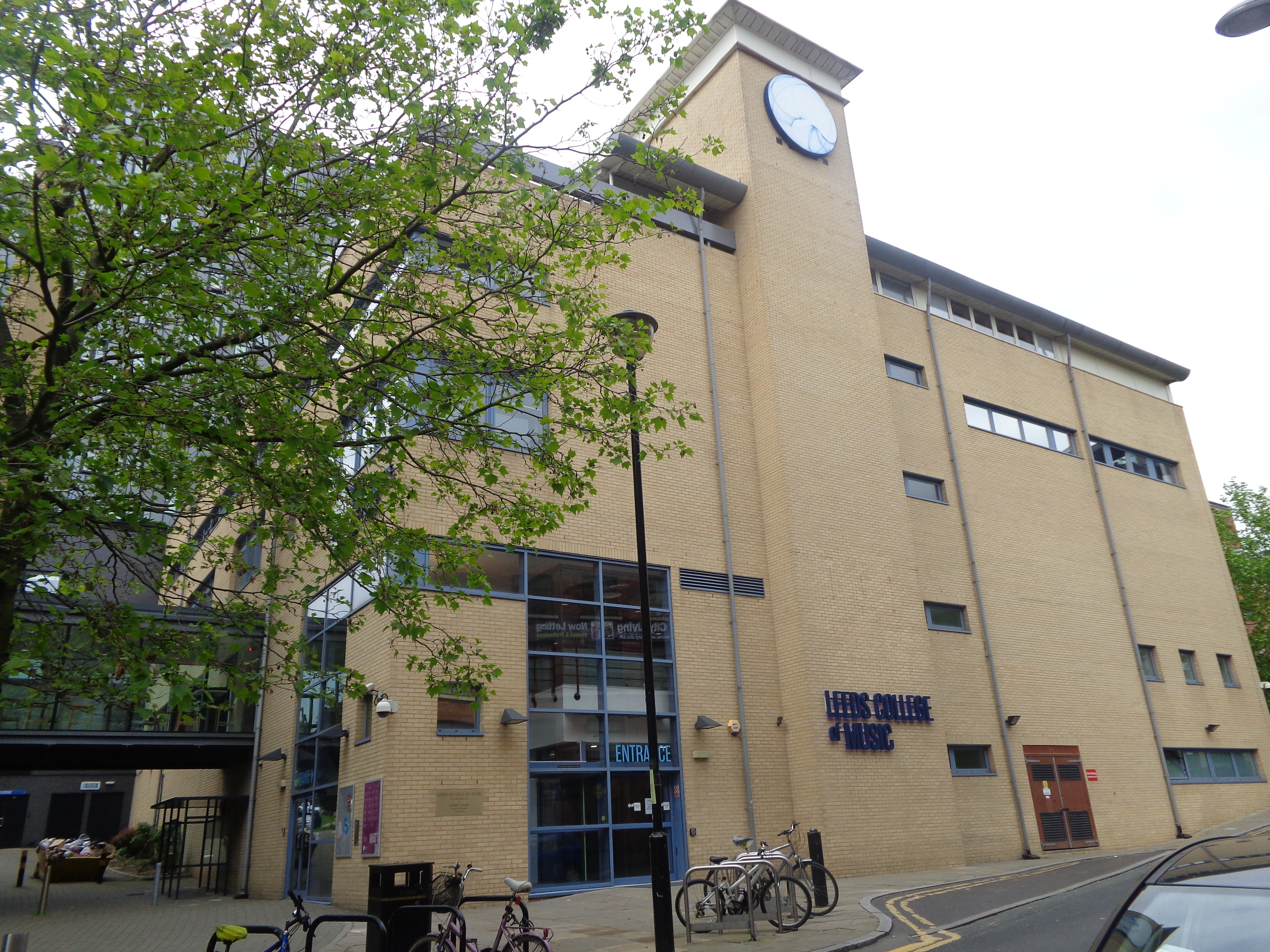
The conservatoire building in Quarry Hill in 2014

Leeds Conservatoire (formerly known as The Leeds Music Centre, the City of Leeds College of Music, and Leeds College of Music) is a higher education music conservatoire based in the Quarry Hill district of Leeds, England. It was founded in 1965 by Joseph Stones.

Aside from its education provision, which also includes short courses and programmes for adults and school-age musicians, Leeds Conservatoire hosts a seasonal programme of concerts, largely in its 350-seat auditorium 'The Venue'. In 2011, Leeds Conservatoire was awarded All-Steinway School status, becoming the only conservatoire in England to have 90% of its pianos from the Steinway family.

Leeds Conservatoire became a wholly owned subsidiary of Leeds City College in August 2011, and is now a member of the Luminate Education Group. In 2018, the conservatoire regained its status as a Higher Education Institution.

== Organisation ==
=== Affiliations ===
Leeds Conservatoire is partnered with Berklee College of Music as part of the Berklee International Network. Leeds Conservatoire is also a member of Conservatoires UK and partner of the European Association of Conservatoires.

== Academic profile ==
Leeds Conservatoire was dissolved as a Higher Education institution in 2009 after merging with Leeds City College, regaining Higher Education status in June 2018.

=== Admission ===
UCAS Admission Statistics
	2017	2016	2015	2014	2013
Applications	1,210	1,210	1,060	1,345	1,420
Enrols	320	355	295	400	370

=== Teaching and degrees ===
Undergraduate courses at Leeds Conservatoire are known as pathways; genres and styles of music that students choose to major in. Courses include Business, Classical, Film Music, Folk, Jazz, Popular, Production, Songwriting, Musical Theatre, Acting and Actor Musician. Students may also choose to combine two pathways. The conservatoire also offers a one-year Foundation Degree certificate providing students with an extra year before commencing their undergraduate study. Completion of any three-year undergraduate pathway will result in students being awarded a Bachelor of Arts. Leeds Conservatoire was the first music institution in Europe to offer a bachelor's degree in the study of Jazz music, and the first conservatoire in the UK to offer a degree in Popular music.

Until September 2018 the conservatoire also ran Further education courses, including BTEC Music and Music Technology. All FE courses were moved to the Creative Arts Faculty of Leeds City College.

The conservatoire also runs a one-year postgraduate programme in which students can study for a Master of Music or postgraduate diploma.

Since September 2013, all undergraduate and postgraduate degree courses are validated by the University of Hull.

In addition to degree courses, Leeds Conservatoire is also host to a series of short courses available to children and adults. This also includes Leeds Junior Conservatoire, previously known as the Saturday Music School, which runs courses available to children from ages 9–18. On Sundays, the conservatoire is also a host for Yorkshire Young Musicians.

== History ==
Leeds Conservatoire was established in 1965 as the Leeds Music Centre, delivering extra-curricular music classes at the Leeds Institute building near Millennium Square, which now houses Leeds City Museum. In 1971, it became affiliated with Leeds University and known as the City of Leeds College of Music. In 1993, the conservatoire launched the first Jazz degree in Europe.

In 1997, the conservatoire was moved to purpose-built premises on Quarry Hill, neighbouring with the Leeds Playhouse, Northern Ballet and the BBC Yorkshire building.

In 2009, the conservatoire announced plans to merge with Bradford University. In the following year, Leeds Conservatoire instead received approval from the Higher Education Funding Council for England (HEFCE) to merge with Leeds City College. On 1 August 2011, the conservatoire became a wholly owned subsidiary within the Leeds City College Group. As a result, the conservatoire lost its Higher Education Institution status, and so all undergraduate and postgraduate degrees were validated, first by Bradford University, and then by the University of Hull.

In 2012, Leeds Conservatoire received a £2 million refurbishment for its recording studios, performance and communal spaces. This also introduced raked seating to the conservatoire's main performance space, The Venue. Funding from the government and additional private donations saw the conservatoire receiving 54 Steinway pianos in September 2011, resulting in the conservatoire becoming the only All-Steinway school in England at the time.

The Sounds Like THIS festival, initiated by the conservatoire, made its debut in March 2017, showcasing artists "who take bold new approaches to sound, incorporating electronic, classical, electroacoustic, opera and immersive visual installation". The festival received a grant from Arts Council England for the 2018 season.

In 2017, the conservatoire revamped its performance space The Venue with a rooftop extension. In September 2017, Leeds Conservatoire unveiled the Leeds Music Library, a new location for their previously internal library space. Following the library's relocation, the conservatoire invested £0.5 million to refurbish the fifth floor of the main building with new practice rooms and study space.

In June 2018, the conservatoire regained its Higher Education Institution status.

In 2019, the conservatoire partnered with Opera North.

From 3 August 2020, Leeds College of Music adopted Leeds Conservatoire as its new name, following the launch of new degree courses in Musical Theatre, Acting and Actor Musician.

== Notable people ==
=== Alumni ===
The conservatoire has produced a variety of notable alumni in different musical disciplines. This includes classical pianist John Barstow, jazz pianists David Newton and Nikki Iles, saxophonists Pete Wareham and Alan Barnes, trumpeters Chris Batchelor and Richard Iles, horn player Alastair Hanson and guitarists Nick Webb and Giuliano Modarelli. Badly Drawn Boy, English Teacher. Snake Davis, John Thirkell, Adrian Snell, Matthew Bourne, James Lynch of Touch and Go, Michael Spearman of Everything Everything, Geoff Downes of Yes and Asia, Chris Sharkey of Trio VD and Acoustic Ladyland, Ryan and Gary Jarman of the Cribs, James Yeoburn Mark Holub and Brett Domino are also associated with the conservatoire. Dave Bainbridge, guitarist with Iona and later keyboards player for Strawbs, also studied there and won the BBC Radio 2 Best Jazz soloist award whilst at the conservatoire. Motorhead drummer Phil Taylor studied drumming at Leeds.

Singer John Newman studied for a BTEC in popular music from the conservatoire.

We Are Domi, the group who represented the Czech Republic at the Eurovision Song Contest 2022, met and formed at the conservatoire.

=== Staff ===
Pianist Fanny Waterman was the former head of the Advanced Performance Course. Jazz musicians Neil Yates, Nikki Iles, Mornington Lockett, Dave O'Higgins, Omar Puente, Louise Gibbs, Peter Churchill have previously taught at the conservatoire, as has the saxophone specialist Richard Ingham. Former John Dankworth trumpet soloist Dick Hawdon was head of Jazz Studies until his retirement in 1992. The Folk faculty includes many notable names including Jim Moray, Nancy Kerr, Bryony Griffith and Pete Flood of Bellowhead.

== Principals ==
Leeds Conservatoire has had five principals since its opening in 1965.

- Joseph Stones (1965–1993)
- David Hoult (1993–2008)
- Philip Meaden (2008–2014)
- Gerry Godley (2014–2020)
- Joe Wilson (2020–present)

== See also ==
- Music school
