= European Association of Conservatoires =

Association of colleges and university schools of music

European Association of Conservatoires or Association of European Conservatoires (AEC) is the main association of colleges and university schools of music in Europe and represents the interests of institutions that are concerned with training for the music profession.

It is abbreviated to and commonly known as the AEC, initials of its original French name, the Association Européenne des Conservatoires. Lately the name was extended to become the Association Européenne des Conservatoires, Académies de Musique et Musikhochschulen hence officially including the German music academies too, an important part of the network.

The AEC was established in 1953 and counts today (2022) about 300 member institutions in 57 countries, not all of them in Europe.

== Organisation ==
- The AEC Office team is based in Brussels in Belgium is responsible for coordinating all AEC activities. It counts seven employees.
- The AEC Council consists of twelve representatives from member institutions (twelve countries) of which the Executive Committee (a President, a Secretary General and two Vice-Presidents).
- The AEC General Assembly is said to be the main body of the Association. It consists of representatives of all AEC active and associate members and is described as the "General Organ of Direction of the Association". The General Assembly meets at least once a year and as often as the Council thinks necessary. It meets to decide on the Association’s policy and activities, to approve the annual reports and finances of the previous year and to elect representatives to the AEC Council.
- The AEC Working Groups consists in a group of experts in Higher Music Education (HME). They work on the preparation of AEC events and activities on a voluntary basis.

== Members ==
- (United Kingdom) UK Members:
1. University of Leeds - School of Music
2. Trinity Laban Conservatoire of Music and Dance
3. Royal Welsh College of Music & Drama
4. Royal Northern College of Music
5. Royal Conservatoire of Scotland
6. Royal College of Music - London
7. Royal Birmingham Conservatoire
8. Royal Academy of Music - London
9. Leeds Conservatoire
10. Guildhall School of Music and Drama
11. London Performing Academy of Music (LPMAM)

== See also ==
- National Association of Schools of Music
- College and university school of music
