= Dauwhe =

Studio album by The John Carter Octet
- Released: 1982
- Recorded: February 25 & 28 and March 8, 1982
- Studio: The Music Lab, Los Angeles, California
- Genre: Jazz
- Length: 41:18
- Label: Black Saint
- Producer: John Carter

John Carter chronology
Night Fire (1981)	Dauwhe (1982)	Tandem 1 (1982)

Dauwhe is an album by American jazz clarinetist John Carter, recorded in 1982 for the Italian Black Saint label.

== Reception ==
The AllMusic review by Scott Yanow stated: "The first of clarinetist John Carter's five-part series in which he musically depicts the history of black Americans is one of the strongest... Highly recommended for open-eared listeners".

Professional ratings
Review scores
Source	Rating
AllMusic	4.5/5 stars
The Penguin Guide to Jazz Recordings	3/4 stars

== Track listing ==
All compositions by John Carter

1. "Dauwhe" - 12:07
2. "Ode to the Flower Maiden" - 7:52
3. "Enter from the East" - 7:57
4. "Soft Dance" - 6:18
5. "The Mating Ritual" - 7:04

== Personnel ==
- John Carter - clarinet
- Bobby Bradford - cornet
- James Newton - flute
- Charles Owens - soprano saxophone, oboe, clarinet
- Red Callender - tuba
- Roberto Miranda - bass
- William Jeffrey - drums
- Luis Peralta - waterphone, percussion
