= John Carter (jazz musician) =

American jazz clarinet, saxophone, and flute player (1929–1991)

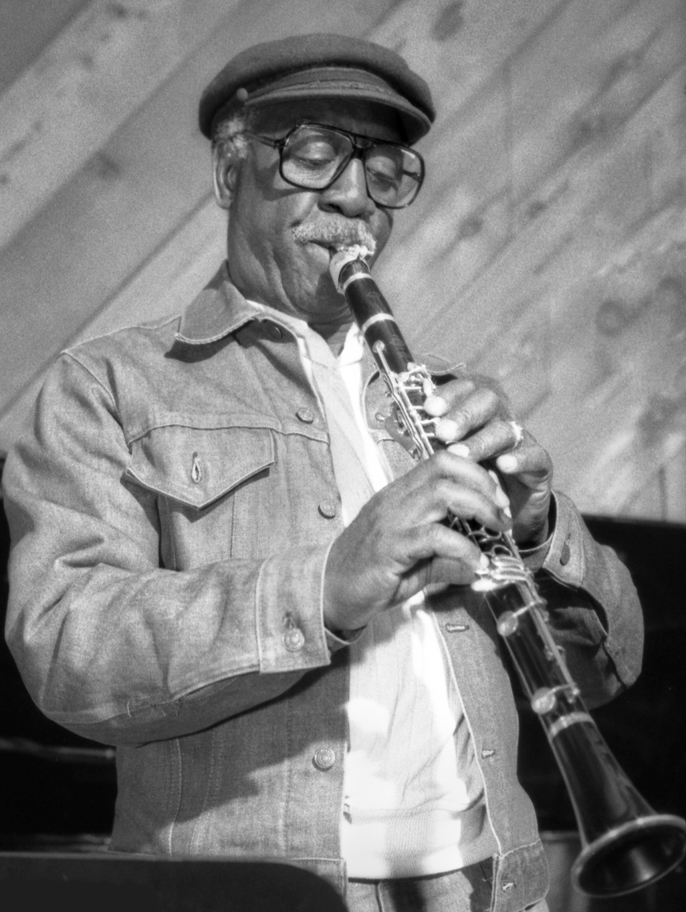
- Carter in 1988

Background information
- Born: John Wallace Carter; September 24, 1929; Fort Worth, Texas, U.S.
- Died: March 31, 1991 (aged 61) Inglewood, California, U.S.
- Genres: Jazz
- Occupations: Musician, educator
- Instruments: Clarinet, saxophone, flute

John Wallace Carter (September 24, 1929 – March 31, 1991) was an American jazz clarinet, saxophone, and flute player. He is noted for the acclaimed Roots and Folklore series, a five-album concept album set inspired by African American life and experiences.

== Biography ==
Born in Fort Worth, Texas, Carter attended I.M. Terrell High School, and played music with schoolmates Ornette Coleman and Charles Moffett in the 1940s.

Carter earned a Bachelor of Arts from Lincoln University in Jefferson, Missouri in 1949, and a Master of Arts from the University of Colorado in 1956. He also studied at the North Texas State and University of California at Los Angeles.

From 1961, Carter was based mainly on the West Coast. There he met Bobby Bradford in 1965, with whom he subsequently worked on a number of projects, notably the New Jazz Art Ensemble. He also played with Hampton Hawes and Harold Land. In the 1970s Carter became well known on the basis of his solo concerts. At New Jazz Festival Moers in 1979, he and the German clarinet player Theo Jörgensmann performed on three days. Afterwards Carter received complimentary reviews and wide recognition from around the world. He and Jörgensmann met again in 1984. The program of the Berlin JazzFest was built around the clarinet. After Carter's solo performance, he and Jörgensmann also played together.

Between 1982 and 1990, Carter composed and recorded Roots and Folklore: Episodes in the Development of American Folk Music, five albums focused on African Americans and their history. The complete set was acclaimed by jazz critics as containing some of the best releases of the 1980s.

A clarinet quartet with Perry Robinson, Jörgensmann and Eckard Koltermann was planned for 1991, but Carter did not recover from a non-malignant tumor. Later that year he was inducted into the Down Beat Jazz Hall of Fame.

== Discography ==
=== As leader/co-leader ===
- 1969: Seeking (Revelation/Hatology)
- 1969: Flight for Four (Flying Dutchman)
- 1970: Self Determination Music (Flying Dutchman)
- 1972: Secrets (Revelation)
- 1975: No U-Turn – Live in Pasadena, 1975 (Dark Tree)
- 1977: Echoes from Rudolph's (Ibedon)
- 1979: Variations on Selected Themes for Jazz Quintet (Moers)
- 1980: Suite of Early American Folk Pieces for Solo Clarinet (Moers)
- 1980: Night Fire (Black Saint)
- 1982: Tandem 1 (Emanem)
- 1989: Comin' On (hat Art) with Bobby Bradford
- 1996: Tandem 2 (Emanem)
- 1982: Dauwhe (Black Saint)
- 1986: Castles of Ghana (Gramavision)
- 1987: Dance of the Love Ghosts (Gramavision)
- 1988: Fields (Gramavision)
- 1989: Shadows on a Wall (Gramavision)

=== As sideman ===
With Tim Berne

- The Five Year Plan (Empire, 1979)

With Clarinet Summit

- You Better Fly Away (MPS, 1979)
- Clarinet Summit (India Navigation, 1983)
- Clarinet Summit, Vol. 2 (India Navigation, 1983)
- Southern Bells (Black Saint, 1987)

With Vinny Golia

- Spirits in Fellowship (Nine Winds, 1977)
- Live at the Century City Playhouse - Los Angeles, 1979 (Dark Tree, 2017)
- Compositions for Large Ensemble (Nine Winds, 1982)

With Richard Grossman

- In the Air (Nine Winds Records, 1991)

With Julius Hemphill

- The Boyé Multi-National Crusade for Harmony (New World, 2021)

With John Lindberg

- The East Side Suite (Sound Aspects Records, 1983)

With James Newton

- The Mystery School (India Navigation, 1980)
- Water Mystery (Gramavision, 1986)

With Horace Tapscott

- The Dark Tree (Hat ART, 1991 [1989])
