= Richard Iles =

British trumpeter

Richard Iles (born 1962 in Birmingham, England) is a jazz trumpeter. As a member of the Midland Youth Jazz Orchestra, he gained valuable experience in jazz. After leaving the Leeds College of Music in 1980 he became a founding member of the Creative Jazz Orchestra, performing with Kenny Wheeler, Mike Gibbs, Anthony Braxton, Vince Mendoza, Peter Erskine, and Bill Frisell.

He worked with the Northern Underground Orchestra led by Tim Garland and the Scottish National Jazz Orchestra directed by Tommy Smith. As a member of the latter, he accompanied Joe Lovano, Kurt Elling, John Scofield, and Gary Burton. He has written music for the nine-piece Miniature Brass Emporium and leads his band, the Richard Iles Group. Iles became a member of the Mike Gibbs band and participated in the recording By the Way. In 2000, he released From Hear to There with music for small and large ensembles.

He was hired as musical director of the Jazz Orchestra at Chetham's School of Music in Manchester and directs the jazz orchestra at Bolton Music Service. He is a principal lecturer in Jazz at Leeds College of Music, teaching trumpet and musical direction.

== Discography ==
=== As leader ===
- From Here to There (2000)

=== As sideman or guest ===
- Composition No. 175 / Composition No. 126: Trillium Dialogues M, Anthony Braxton (Leo, 1994 [2006])
- A Quiet Eye, June Tabor (2000)
- Always, June Tabor (2005)
- Celebration, Arild Andersen, Scottish National Jazz Orchestra, Tommy Smith (2012)
