= Chico Freeman discography =

This is the discography for American jazz musician Chico Freeman.

== As leader ==
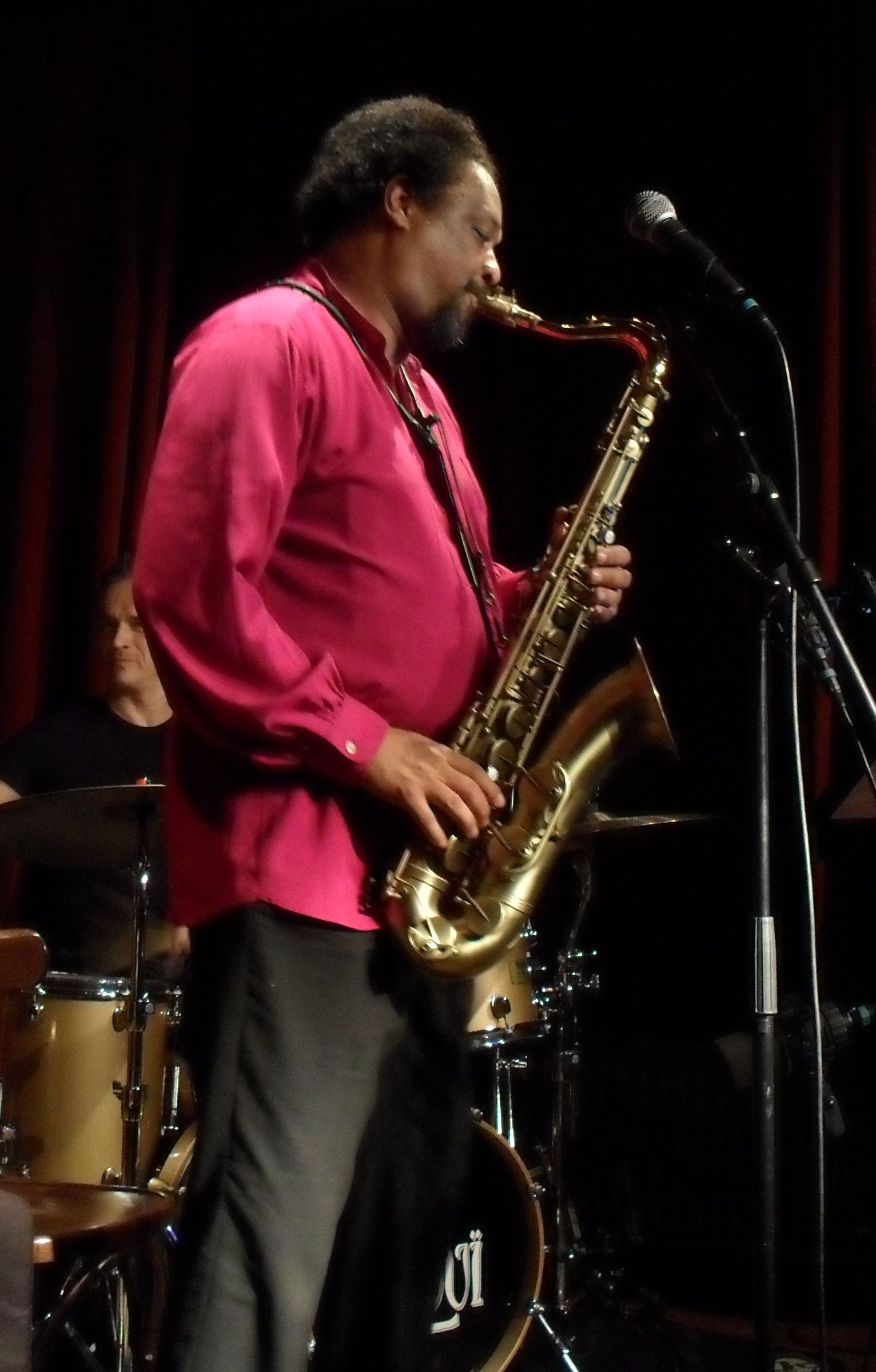
Chico Freeman in 2011 at L'Inouï Jazz club in Redange, Luxembourg.

- Morning Prayer (India Navigation/Whynot, 1976)
- Chico (India Navigation, 1977)
- Beyond the Rain (Contemporary, 1978)
- Kings of Mali (India Navigation, 1978)
- The Outside Within (India Navigation, 1978)
- Spirit Sensitive (India Navigation, 1979)
- No Time Left (Black Saint, 1979)
- Peaceful Heart, Gentle Spirit (Contemporary, 1980)
- Destiny's Dance (Contemporary, 1981)
- Tradition in Transition (Elektra/Musician, 1982)
- The Search (India Navigation, 1982)
- Tangents featuring Bobby McFerrin (Elektra/Musician, 1984)
- Live at Ronnie Scott’s (Hendring, 1988; recorded 1986)
- The Pied Piper (Black-Hawk, 1987)
- Tales of Ellington (Black-Hawk, 1987)
- Lord Riff and Me (Whynot/Candid, 2010; recorded 1987)
- Mystical Dreamer with Brainstorm (In & Out, 1989)
- You’ll Know When You Get There (Black Saint, 1990)
- Sweet Explosion with Brainstorm (In & Out, 1990)
- Threshold with Brainstorm (In & Out, 1993)
- The Unspoken Word with Arthur Blythe live at Ronnie Scott’s (Jazz House, 1994)
- Focus (Contemporary, 1995)
- Still Sensitive (India Navigation, 1995)
- The Emissary (Clarity, 1996)
- Oh, by the Way with Guataca (Double Moon, 2002)
- Out of Many Comes the One (Arabesque, 2004)
- The Essence of Silence with the Fritz Pauer Trio (CD Baby/Jive Music, 2010)
- Elvin: Tribute to Elvin Jones with Joe Lovano (CD Baby/Jive Music/Edel, 2012)
- The Arrival with Heiri Känzig (Intakt, 2015)
- Spoken Into Existence (Jive Music, 2015)

== As co-leader ==
With Arthur Blythe

- Luminous (Jazz House, 1989)
- Night Song (Clarity, 1997)

With Von Freeman

- Freeman & Freeman (India Navigation, 1981)
- Fathers & Sons (Columbia, 1982), only B-side (A-side provided by Marsalis family)
- Live at the Blue Note with Special Guest Dianne Reeves (Half Note, 1999)

With The Leaders

- Mudfoot (Black-Hawk, 1986)
- Out Here Like This (Black-Hawk, 1987)
- Unforeseen Blessings (Black Saint, 1988)
- Slipping and Sliding (Sound Hills, 1994)
- Spirits Alike (Double Moon, 2007)

With David Murray

- David Murray, Chico Freeman with Özay (ITM, 2011)

With Roots (Arthur Blythe, Nathan Davis, Sam Rivers, a.o.)

- Salutes the Saxophone - Tributes to John Coltrane, Dexter Gordon, Sonny Rollins and Lester Young (In & Out, 1992)
- Stablemates (In & Out, 1993)
- Say Something (In & Out, 1995)
- For Diz & Bird (In & Out, 2000)

With Mal Waldron

- Up and Down (Black Saint, 1989)

With The Young Lions (a.k.a. Lincoln Center Stars), feat. Wynton Marsalis, Paquito D’Rivera, Kevin Eubanks, Anthony Davis, a.o.

- The Young Lions (Elektra/Musician, 1982)

== As sideman ==
With Ahmed Abdullah

- Live at Ali's Alley (Cadence Jazz, 1980)

With Jack DeJohnette

- Tin Can Alley (ECM, 1981)
- Inflation Blues (ECM, 1983)

With Kip Hanrahan

- Coup de tête (American Clavé, 1981)
- Tenderness (American Clavé, 1990)
- All Roads Are Made of the Flesh (American Clavé, 1995)

With Jay Hoggard

- Rain Forrest (Contemporary, 1981)

With La Mont Zeno Theatre

- Black Fairy (Taifa, 1975)

With Carmen Lundy

- Moment to Moment (Arabesque, 1992)

With Cecil McBee

- Music from the Source (Enja, 1978)
- Compassion (Enja, 1979)
- Alternate Spaces (India Navigation, 1979)

With Don Pullen, Fred Hopkins and Bobby Battle

- Warriors (Black Saint, 1978)

With The Pyramids

- Music of Idris Ackamoor (Compilation on EM (Japan), 2006)

With Sam Rivers' Rivbea All-Star Orchestra

- Inspiration (BMG France, 1999)
- Culmination (BMG France, 1999)

With Dom Um Romão

- Saudades (Water Lily Acoustics, 1993)

With McCoy Tyner

- La Leyenda de La Hora (Columbia, 1981)

With Edward Vesala

- Heavy Life (Leo, 1980)

With the Reto Weber Percussion Orchestra and Franco Ambrosetti

- Face to Face (Live at the Jazzfest Berlin '99) (Double Moon, 1999)

With Mari Wilson

- The Rhythm Romance (Dino, 1991)
