= The Exchange Session =

The Exchange Session may refer to:

- The Exchange Session Vol. 1, a 2006 album by Kieran Hebden and Steve Reid
- The Exchange Session Vol. 2, a 2006 album by Kieran Hebden and Steve Reid
