= Spirits Alike =

Studio album by the Leaders
- Released: 2006
- Recorded: August 29 and 30, 2006
- Studio: Twinz, New Jersey
- Genre: Jazz
- Label: Double Moon; DMCHR 71060
- Producer: Chico Freeman, Volker Dueck

The Leaders chronology
Slipping and Sliding (1994)	Spirits Alike (2006)

Spirits Alike is an album by the all-star jazz group the Leaders. It was recorded in August 2006 in New Jersey, and was released later that year by Double Moon Records. The album features performances by a reconstituted version of the band: original members Chico Freeman (tenor saxophone) and Cecil McBee (bass) are joined by alto saxophonist Bobby Watson (replacing Arthur Blythe), trumpeter Eddie Henderson (replacing Lester Bowie), pianist Fred Harris (replacing Kirk Lightsey), and drummer Billy Hart (replacing Don Moye).

== Reception ==
Professional ratings
Review scores
Source	Rating
All About Jazz	3/5 stars
AllMusic	4/5 stars
The Penguin Guide to Jazz	3/4 stars

In a review for AllMusic, Scott Yanow wrote that "the new Leaders are of the same high quality as the original group. The music, all originals from bandmembers, ranges from advanced hard bop to hints of the avant-garde, from bluesy material to a pair of duets by Freeman and McBee. Watson and Freeman in particular consistently take solo honors although all of the musicians fare well. Recommended."

The authors of The Penguin Guide to Jazz Recordings stated: "With Freeman and McBee the only remaining members from the original group, one might reasonably expect this to sound nothing like the earlier records. In fact, the similarities are greater than anticipated, a nice blend of straightforward hard bop and some more adventurous material."

Troy Collins, writing for All About Jazz, noted that, in comparison with the original lineup, the new version of the band "has a more mainstream pedigree. Although the former incarnation of the super-group leaned further out than this one, the change in personnel doesn't affect its ability to swing... While the new line-up might lack some of the primal bite of the original, The Leaders soldiers on, still swinging mightily two decades later."

In an article for Jazz Times, Forrest Dylan Bryant commented: "The band's rapport is evident throughout the set, in its tight ensemble work, in-the-pocket soloing and several well-executed improvisational outros."

== Track listing ==
1. "Deep Pockets" (Bobby Watson) – 7:56
2. "Evolution" (Chico Freeman, Madhav Chari) – 5:18
3. "Spirits Alike" (Chico Freeman, Jan Pulsford, Robert Bond) – 6:37
4. "Consequence" (Cecil McBee) – 3:29
5. "The Ascended One" (Fred Harris) – 7:41
6. "Remembering Bob C Vol. 1" (Cecil McBee, Chico Freeman) – 2:30
7. "Lullaby For Imka" (Billy Hart) – 7:06
8. "Lady Bugg" (Cecil McBee) – 7:53
9. "Alas Poor John" (Chico Freeman, Jan Pulsford) – 8:51
10. "Remembering Bob C Vol. 2" (Cecil McBee, Chico Freeman) – 3:01

== Personnel ==
- Chico Freeman – tenor saxophone, soprano saxophone
- Bobby Watson – alto saxophone
- Eddie Henderson – trumpet
- Fred Harris – piano
- Cecil McBee – bass
- Billy Hart – drums
