= Heaven Dance =

Studio album by the Leaders Trio
- Released: 1984
- Recorded: May 28 & 29, 1988
- Studio: Sound Ideas Studio A, New York City
- Genre: Jazz
- Length: 50:44
- Label: Sunnyside; SSC 1034
- Producer: François Zalacain

The Leaders chronology
Out Here Like This (1987)	Heaven Dance (1984)	Unforeseen Blessings (1988)

Kirk Lightsey chronology
Temptation (1987)	Heaven Dance (1988)	From Kirk to Nat (1990)

Heaven Dance is an album by the Leaders Trio, pianist Kirk Lightsey, bassist Cecil McBee and drummer Don Moye, recorded in 1988 and released by the Sunnyside label.

== Reception ==
Professional ratings
Review scores
Source	Rating
AllMusic	4/5 stars
The Penguin Guide to Jazz	3.5/4 stars

The AllMusic review states: "Although there is close interplay by the musicians, the pianist is the lead voice, so one can look at this set as being a date by the Kirk Lightsey Trio. Excellent modern mainstream music".

The authors of The Penguin Guide to Jazz Recordings wrote that the album "sends us back to the original Leaders sets with a heightened awareness of what was going on in the warp-factor engine-room. Which is not to say that Heaven Dance is not a substantial achievement on its own terms... Recommended."

== Track listing ==
1. "Peacemaker" (Cecil McBee) – 7:39
2. "Unc'a Bubba" (Gary Bartz) – 6:24
3. "Cecil to Cecil" (McBee) – 4:37
4. "This Is All I Ask" (Gordon Jenkins) – 4:55
5. "Heaven Dance" (Kirk Lightsey) – 6:37
6. "Little Big John" (McBee) – 5:44
7. "Fresh Air" (Lightsey) – 7:55
8. "Ode to Wilbur Ware" (Don Moye) – 6:53

== Personnel ==
- Kirk Lightsey – piano, flute
- Cecil McBee – bass
- Don Moye – drums, percussion
