= Lenox Avenue Breakdown =

Studio album by Arthur Blythe
- Released: April 1979
- Recorded: 1978
- Studios: Mediasound, New York City
- Genre: Jazz
- Length: 39:58
- Label: Columbia
- Producer: Bob Thiele

Arthur Blythe chronology
In the Tradition (1979)	Lenox Avenue Breakdown (1979)	Illusions (1980)

Lenox Avenue Breakdown is an album by jazz saxophonist Arthur Blythe. It was released by Columbia Records in 1979 and reissued by Koch Jazz in 1998. The album reached No. 35 on the Billboard Jazz Albums chart in 1979.

== Reception ==
Professional ratings
Review scores
Source	Rating
AllMusic	4/5 stars
Christgau's Record Guide	A
The Penguin Guide to Jazz	👑
The Rolling Stone Jazz Record Guide	4/5 stars

Newsday called Lenox Avenue Breakdown "urbane, lucid jazz played with an animated spirit.' The Buffalo News deemed it a "blistering, eminently approachable set from a top level band."

The Penguin Guide to Jazz included Lenox Avenue Breakdown in its "Core Collection," and assigned its "crown" accolade to the album, along with a four-star rating (of a possible four stars). Penguin editors Richard Cook and Brian Morton called the album "one of the lost masterpieces of modern jazz," owing to its long period of unavailability before the 1998 CD release. Cook and Morton noted that "[Bob] Stewart's long tuba solo on the title-piece is one of the few genuinely important tuba statements in jazz, a nimble sermon that promises storms and sunshine."

Thom Jurek, writing for AllMusic, notes that "this group lays like a band that had been together for years, not the weeklong period it took them to rehearse and create one of Blythe's masterpieces. Over 20 years later, Lenox Avenue Breakdown still sounds new and different and ranks among the three finest albums in his catalog."

== Track listing ==
All compositions by Arthur Blythe.

Side one

1. "Down San Diego Way" – 7:44
2. "Lenox Avenue Breakdown" – 13:11

Side two

1. "Slidin' Through" – 9:33
2. "Odessa" – 9:30

== Personnel ==
- Arthur Blythe – alto saxophone, mixing
- James Newton – flute
- Bob Stewart – tuba
- James "Blood" Ulmer – guitar
- Cecil McBee – bass
- Jack DeJohnette – drums
- Guillermo Franco – percussion
- Bob Thiele – producer, mixing
- Doug Epstein – engineer, mixing
  - Carl Beatty, Lincoln Clapp – assistant engineers
- Vladimir Meller – mastering
- Gene Greif – design
- Mark Hess – illustration
- Jim Houghton – photography
- Stanley Crouch – liner notes
- Donald Elfman – reissue producer
- Nicole Cavalluzzo – reissue design

== Release history ==
Region	Date	Label	Format	Catalog
United States	1979	Columbia	LP	JC 35638
United States	1998	Koch	CD	KOC-CD-7871
