= Blythe Spirit =

Studio album by Arthur Blythe
- Released: 1981
- Recorded: 1981
- Studios: CBS, New York
- Genre: Jazz
- Label: Columbia
- Producers: Jim Fishel, Arthur Blythe

Arthur Blythe chronology
Illusions (1980)	Blythe Spirit (1981)	Elaborations (1982)

Blythe Spirit is an album by the American jazz saxophonist Arthur Blythe. It was his fourth album for the Columbia label, recorded in New York City in 1981.

== Reception ==
The AllMusic review by Scott Yanow states: "This is one of the most well-rounded Arthur Blythe records from his Columbia period... a fairly definitive Arthur Blythe recording, showing off his links to hard bop, r&b and the avant-garde". NME listed it as the 30th best album of 1981.

Professional ratings
Review scores
Source	Rating
AllMusic	3/5 stars
The Rolling Stone Jazz Record Guide	3/5 stars

== Track listing ==
All compositions by Arthur Blythe except as indicated

1. "Contemplation" - 6:54
2. "Faceless Woman" - 6:41
3. "Reverence" - 6:25
4. "Strike Up the Band" (George Gershwin, Ira Gershwin) - 2:44
5. "Misty" (Johnny Burke, Erroll Garner) - 7:24
6. "Spirits in the Field" - 3:29
7. "Just a Closer Walk with Thee" (Traditional) - 5:25

== Personnel ==
- Arthur Blythe – alto saxophone
- Abdul Wadud – cello (tracks 1–4 & 6)
- Kelvyn Bell – guitar (tracks 1–4)
- Bob Stewart – tuba (tracks 1–4, 6 & 7)
- John Hicks – piano (track 5)
- Amina Claudine Myers – organ (track 7)
- Fred Hopkins – bass (track 5)
- Bobby Battle (tracks 1–4), Steve McCall (track 5) – drums
