= Light Blue: Arthur Blythe Plays Thelonious Monk =

Studio album by Arthur Blythe
- Released: 1983
- Recorded: 1983
- Genre: Jazz
- Label: Columbia
- Producer: Arthur Blythe

Arthur Blythe chronology
Elaborations (1982)	Light Blue: Arthur Blythe Plays Thelonious Monk (1983)	Put Sunshine in It (1985)

Light Blue: Arthur Blythe Plays Thelonious Monk is jazz saxophonist Arthur Blythe's sixth album for the Columbia label, recorded in New York City in 1983. The album features Blythe's quintet performing compositions by Thelonious Monk.

== Critical reception ==
Professional ratings
Review scores
Source	Rating
AllMusic	3/5 stars
The Philadelphia Inquirer	5/5 stars
The Rolling Stone Jazz Record Guide	4/5 stars

The Philadelphia Inquirer wrote that "Blythe's alto sax variably wavers and squawks, blowing hard and soft, lyrical and tough, as his group, with its inventive contrast of big and little sounds, bops and floats and rocks."

The AllMusic review by Scott Yanow stated that "these creative players (and the unusual instrumentation) put a fresh slant on Monk's music... Blythe's passionate sound throughout this inspired set is consistently memorable."

== Track listing ==
All compositions by Thelonious Monk.

1. "We See" - 6:30
2. "Light Blue" - 5:12
3. "Off Minor" - 6:48
4. "Epistrophy" - 8:38
5. "Coming On the Hudson" - 6:05
6. "Nutty" - 6:45

It was recorded at CBS Recording Studios, New York.

== Personnel ==
- Arthur Blythe – alto saxophone
- Abdul Wadud – cello
- Kelvyn Bell – guitar
- Bob Stewart – tuba
- Bobby Battle – drums
