= Bush Baby =

Bush Baby may refer to:

- Galago, also known as bush babies, small nocturnal primates
- Bush Baby (album), an album by Arthur Blythe
- The Bush Baby, a 1992 anime series
- Children born in the US between 2001 and 2009, during the administration of George W. Bush
