= Elaborations =

Studio album by Arthur Blythe
- Released: 1982
- Recorded: 1982
- Genre: Jazz
- Label: Columbia
- Producers: Jim Fishel, Arthur Blythe

Arthur Blythe chronology
Blythe Spirit (1981)	Elaborations (1982)	Light Blue: Arthur Blythe Plays Thelonious Monk (1983)

Elaborations is an album by the American jazz saxophonist Arthur Blythe, released in 1982.

== Reception ==
Professional ratings
Review scores
Source	Rating
AllMusic	2.5/5 stars
The Rolling Stone Jazz Record Guide	4/5 stars

The AllMusic review by Scott Yanow states: "This post bop music (which falls between advanced hard bop and the avant-garde) is well worth several listens". In The Boston Phoenix, Bob Blumenthal focused on cellist Abdul Wadud's playing ("his bowing is clear and mobile as a violinist's, his lines are sweeping and rhapsodic"), but also noted that "there are other rewards as well on Elaborations: Stewart's barrel-chested blowing, Bell's growing assertiveness, Blythe’s invigorating swing".

== Track listing ==
All compositions by Arthur Blythe except as indicated

1. "Elaborations" - 7:23
2. "Metamorphosis" - 6:18
3. "Sister Daisy" - 7:17
4. "One Mint Julep" (Rudolph Toombs) - 4:54
5. "Shadows" - 4:25
6. "Lower Nile" - 10:37

Recorded at CBS Recording Studios, New York

== Personnel ==
- Arthur Blythe – alto saxophone
- Abdul Wadud – cello
- Kelvyn Bell – guitar
- Bob Stewart – tuba
- Bobby Battle – drums
- Wilbur Morris – bass (track 3)
- Muhammad Abdullah – congas (track 6)
