= Goin' Home (Bob Stewart album) =

Studio album by Bob Stewart First Line Band
- Released: 1989
- Recorded: December 1988; RPM Studios, New York City
- Genre: Jazz
- Length: 49:40
- Label: JMT; JMT 834 427
- Producer: Stefan F. Winter

Bob Stewart chronology
| First Line (1988) | Goin' Home (1989) | Then and Now (1996) |

Goin' Home is the second album by tubist Bob Stewart which was recorded in 1988 and released on the JMT label.

== Reception ==
The AllMusic review by Scott Yanow called it "Stimulating and often-surprising music that is generally more accessible than one might expect".

Professional ratings
Review scores
| Source | Rating |
|---|---|
| AllMusic | 4.5/5 stars |
| The Penguin Guide to Jazz Recordings | 3/4 stars |

== Track listing ==
All compositions by Bob Stewart except as indicated

1. "Subi la Nas Alturas" (Kelvyn Bell) - 7:04
2. "Art Deco" (Don Cherry) - 6:14
3. "Bell and Ponce" (Olu Dara) - 6:00
4. "Tunk" - 6:55
5. "Sugar Finger" (Traditional) - 5:33
6. "Sweet Georgia Brown Sweet:" - 5:17
  1. "Sweet Georgia Brown" (Ben Bernie, Maceo Pinkard, Kenneth Casey) - 3:59
  2. "Windmill" (Kenny Dorham) - 0:39
  3. "Donna" (Jackie McLean) - 0:35
7. "Priestess" (Billy Harper) - 12:37

== Personnel ==
- Bob Stewart - tuba
- Earl Gardner (tracks 1 & 7), James Zoller - trumpet
- John Clark - French horn (track 7)
- Steve Turre - trombone
- Jerome Harris - electric guitar
- Buddy Williams (tracks 1, 3 & 3–7), Ed Blackwell (tracks 2 & 4) - drums
- Frank Conlon - percussion (tracks 1 & 5)
