= First Line (album) =

Studio album by Bob Stewart
- Released: 1988
- Recorded: November 1987; RPM Sound Studios, New York City
- Genre: Jazz
- Length: 44:14
- Label: JMT; JMT 880 014
- Producer: Stefan F. Winter

Bob Stewart chronology
First Line (1988)	Goin' Home (1989)

First Line is the debut album by tubist Bob Stewart which was recorded in 1988 and released on the JMT label.

== Reception ==
The AllMusic review by Brian Olewnick called it "a bright, juicy set, rambunctious and alive, heavy on the bottom and rolling on top".

Professional ratings
Review scores
Source	Rating
AllMusic	4/5 stars
The Penguin Guide to Jazz Recordings	3.5/4 stars

== Track listing ==
All compositions by Bob Stewart except as indicated

1. "First Line" - 3:38
2. "C.J." - 6:02
3. "Metamorphosis" (Arthur Blythe) - 5:08
4. "Sometimes I Feel Like a Motherless Child/Nonet" (Traditional/Bob Stewart) - 7:42
5. "Hey Mama" (Traditional) - 3:20
6. "Bush Baby" (Blythe) 7:14
7. "Surinam" (Traditional) 4:04
8. "Hambone" - 6:43

== Personnel ==
- Bob Stewart - tuba
- Stanton Davis - trumpet
- Steve Turre - trombone, conch shell
- Kelvyn Bell - electric guitar
- Idris Muhammad - drums
- Arto Tunçboyacıyan - percussion
