= Basic Blythe =

Studio album by Arthur Blythe
- Released: 1988
- Genre: Jazz
- Label: Columbia

Arthur Blythe chronology
Da-Da (1986)	Basic Blythe (1988)	Hipmotism (1991)

Basic Blythe is an album by the American saxophonist Arthur Blythe, released in 1988. It was his final album for Columbia Records. Blythe supported it with East Coast live dates.

== Production ==
Blythe was backed by Bobby Battle on drums, Anthony Cox on bass, and John Hicks, who also composed "Heart to Heart", on piano. The arrangements for the eight-piece string section of violin, cello, and viola were by Bob Friedman. "Ruby My Dear" is a version of the Thelonious Monk song. "Lenox Avenue Breakdown" is an interpretation of one of Blythe's most famous compositions. "Autumn in New York" is a take on the Vernon Duke standard.

== Critical reception ==
Professional ratings
Review scores
Source	Rating
All Music Guide to Jazz	4/5 stars
The Encyclopedia of Popular Music	3/5 stars
MusicHound Jazz: The Essential Album Guide	4/5 stars
The Rolling Stone Jazz & Blues Album Guide	4.5/5 stars
The Sacramento Union	4.5/5 stars
The Windsor Star	A−

The Boston Globe opined, "This is one of Blythe's better efforts because he's playing up to his considerable potential here, and some times he hasn't. He also has first rate sidemen who are capable of pushing him". The St. Louis Post-Dispatch concluded that "the tone Arthur Blythe achieves on the alto saxophone is one of the most immediately riveting of any instrumentalist in jazz." The Globe and Mail noted that "the cushioning presence of strings makes the natural edge on his playing seem even sharper and his passions more vivid."

The Gazette said that "Blythe's aggressive, rootsy swinging is perfectly complemented by his fiery sound." The Windsor Star said that "the strings avoid that cliche-cushioning sound used in jazz—they have a darkly astringent sound, playing almost boppishly on the theme of 'Lenox Avenue Breakdown'". The Sacramento Union praised the "near-perfect" album and "musky ... earthy and rich" saxophone tone.

== Track listing ==
No.	Title	Length
1.	"Autumn in New York (Part One)"
2.	"Lenox Avenue Breakdown"
3.	"Heart to Heart"
4.	"As of Yet"
5.	"Ruby My Dear"
6.	"Faceless Woman"
7.	"Autumn in New York (Part Two)"
