= Da-Da =

Studio album by Arthur Blythe
- Released: 1986
- Studio: Sound Ideas
- Genre: Jazz
- Length: 34:24
- Label: Columbia
- Producer: Arthur Blythe (all tracks), Bruce Purse (track 2), Vincent Henry (tracks 2 and 3)

Arthur Blythe chronology
Put Sunshine in It (1985)	Da-Da (1986)	Basic Blythe (1987)

Da-Da is an album by the American saxophonist Arthur Blythe, released in 1986. Its title came from Blythe's son.

== Production ==
The album was coproduced by Bruce Purse. Blythe made heavy use of synthesizers. He considered some of the songs a return to the dance and blues styles of his youth. Olu Dara played cornet. John Hicks played piano. "After Paris" is a version of the Roland Hanna song; "Crescent" is an interpretation of the John Coltrane song.

== Critical reception ==
Professional ratings
Review scores
Source	Rating
AllMusic	3/5 stars
Robert Christgau	B
The Encyclopedia of Popular Music	3/5 stars

Robert Christgau wrote that "Blythe is a major musician and except for one piece of dinky funk this passes pleasantly enough, but its conceptual confusion epitomizes jazz's commercial impasse." The Ottawa Citizen stated that Blythe "can range freely from boppish lines through to free form and funk, with intermediate stops to sample the ideas of John Coltrane, Mid-East tonalities, gospel roots and latin rhythms."

The Sun-Sentinel deemed Da-Da "a multifaceted and perfectly balanced recording steeped in the essence of jazz." The Omaha World-Herald concluded that "Dara's contributions show that he continues to be a promising talent deserving of his own leadership date."

AllMusic wrote that "'Splain Thang', with its electronic rhythms, is a bit commercial but Bob Stewart's crazy electric tuba solo holds one's interest."

== Track listing ==
No.	Title	Length
1.	"Odessa"	7:32
2.	"Splain Thang"	5:32
3.	"Esquinas (Corners)"	4:55
4.	"Crescent"	6:34
5.	"Break Tune"	5:39
6.	"After Paris"	4:11
