= Shorter by Two =

Studio album by Kirk Lightsey and Harold Danko
- Released: 1984
- Recorded: July 19 & 21, 1983
- Studio: Penthouse Recordings, New York, NY
- Genre: Jazz
- Length: 54:45 CD reissue with additional track
- Label: Sunnyside; SSC 1004
- Producer: François Zalacain

Kirk Lightsey chronology
Everything Happens to Me (1983)	Shorter by Two (1984)	Lightsey 2 (1984)

Harold Danko chronology
Mirth Song (1982)	Shorter by Two (1984)	Ink and Water (1985)

Shorter by Two, subtitled The Music of Wayne Shorter Played on Two Pianos , is an album by pianists Kirk Lightsey and Harold Danko, featuring compositions by Wayne Shorter, that was recorded in 1983 and released by the Sunnyside label. The 1989 CD reissue included an additional track.

== Reception ==
Professional ratings
Review scores
Source	Rating
Allmusic	4.5/5 stars

The Allmusic review states "This CD is an off-the-wall project that was a big success. Kirk Lightsey and Harold Danko perform duo piano versions of 11 Wayne Shorter compositions ... bringing out unexpected beauty during their very different interpretations of the complex and often haunting material. Highly recommended". In JazzTimes, Michael J. West wrote "Even the conscientious jazz collector might have missed Shorter by Two upon its original 1984 release, performed as it was by Kirk Lightsey and Harold Danko, two of the most underrated pianists in jazz then and now. But 33 years later, Wayne Shorter having assumed elder statesmanship and acclaim as jazz’s greatest living composer, the music therein has greater prestige even as its players continue to get shortchanged".

== Track listing ==
All compositions by Wayne Shorter

1. "Ana Maria" – 9:26
2. "Delores" – 4:23
3. "Dance Cadaverous" – 6:51
4. "Pinocchio" – 2:54
5. "Marie Antoinette" – 4:06 Bonus track on CD reissue
6. "Armageddon" – 3:35
7. "Lester Left Town" – 3:01
8. "Witch Hunt" – 5:46
9. "Iris" – 6:35
10. "El Gaucho" – 4:11
11. "Nefertiti" – 3:57

== Personnel ==
- Kirk Lightsey, Harold Danko – piano
