= Milano Strut =

Studio album by Don Pullen
- Released: 1978
- Recorded: December 1978
- Genre: Jazz
- Length: 40:32
- Label: Black Saint
- Producer: Giacomo Pellicciotti

Don Pullen chronology
Warriors (1978)	Milano Strut (1978)	The Magic Triangle (1979)

Milano Strut is an album by American jazz pianist Don Pullen featuring drummer/percussionist Don Moye, recorded in 1978 for the Italian Black Saint label.

== Reception ==
The AllMusic review by Eugene Chadbourne deemed the album "a set of performances, each in the 10-minute range, that are among Pullen's finest work... The pianist unleashes the earthy, even raging power he absorbed from the Charles Mingus combo and also displays a kind of compositional memory for details and nuances that will prove to be important as each piece unfolds."

Professional ratings
Review scores
Source	Rating
AllMusic	4/5 stars
The Penguin Guide to Jazz Recordings	3/4 stars

== Track listing ==
All compositions by Don Pullen

1. "Conversation" - 9:10
2. "Communication" - 10:38
3. "Milano Strut" - 7:28
4. "Curve Eleven (For Giuseppi)" - 13:16

- Recorded at Barigozzi Studio in Milano, Italy in December 1978

== Personnel ==
- Don Pullen - piano, organ
- Don Moye - drums, percussion, congas, bells
