= Blythe Byte =

Studio album by Arthur Blythe
- Released: July 24, 2001
- Recorded: March 17, 2001
- Studios: Tedesco, Paramus, NJ
- Genre: Jazz
- Length: 54:28
- Labels: Savant; SCD 2036
- Producer: Cecil Brooks III

Arthur Blythe chronology
Spirits in the Field (2000)	Blythe Byte (2001)	Focus (2002)

Blythe Byte is an album by the saxophonist Arthur Blythe, recorded in 2001 and released on the Savant label.

== Reception ==
Professional ratings
Review scores
Source	Rating
AllMusic	4.5/5 stars
The Penguin Guide to Jazz	3/4 stars

In his review on AllMusic, arwulf arwulf called it "a well-balanced assortment". In JazzTimes, Bill Bennett wrote: "Working here in (and out of) a quartet setting, Blythe dances deftly between what we know and what he wants to show us".

== Track listing ==
All compositions by Arthur Blythe except where noted

1. "Hardly" – 7:29
2. "Besame Mucho" (Consuelo Velázquez, Sunny Skylar) – 5:47
3. "Blue Monk" (Thelonious Monk) – 6:09
4. "Light Blue" (Monk) – 5:02
5. "And One" (Dwayne Dolphin) – 6:23
6. "My Little Brown Book" (Billy Strayhorn) – 6:15
7. "Naima" (John Coltrane) – 6:11
8. "Ruby, My Dear" (Monk) – 6:00
9. "Blythe Byte" – 0:43
10. "What a Friend We Have in Jesus" (Joseph Scriven, Charles Crozat Converse) – 4:29

== Personnel ==
- Arthur Blythe – alto saxophone
- John Hicks – piano (tracks 1–8 & 10)
- Dwayne Dolphin – bass (tracks 1–3 & 5–7)
- Cecil Brooks III – drums (tracks 1–3 & 5–7)
