= Lady Bird (album) =

Studio album by Archie Shepp
- Released: 1979
- Recorded: December 7, 1978, New York City
- Genre: Jazz
- Length: 41:45
- Label: Denon

Lady Bird is an album by saxophonist Archie Shepp, recorded in 1978.

== Recording and music ==
Lady Bird was recorded in New York City on December 7, 1978. Shepp plays alto sax on the album, with Jaki Byard (piano), Cecil McBee (bass), and Roy Haynes (drums).

== Release ==
The album was released by Denon Records.

== Reception ==
Professional ratings
Review scores
Source	Rating
AllMusic	4/5 stars
MusicHound Jazz	4/5 stars
The Penguin Guide to Jazz	3.5/4 stars
The Virgin Encyclopedia of Jazz	3/5 stars

The authors of The Penguin Guide to Jazz Recordings described Shepp's Parker readings as "irregular pearls with a raw, slightly meretricious beauty," and called the first three tracks "first rate, with Byard and McBee birling through the changes at a furious lick, and Haynes crowding the saxophonist through each of his choruses."

Garaud MacTaggart of MusicHound Jazz stated that the sidemen "push Shepp to perform these bop classics at his best," and noted that "Byard is especially effective in his solo spots" while McBee and Haynes "keep the pulse cruising."

== Track listing ==
1. "Donna Lee" (Charlie Parker) – 6:32
2. "Relaxin' at Camarillo" (Parker) – 7:14
3. "Now's the Time" (Parker) – 7:43
4. "Lady Bird" (Tadd Dameron) – 7:47
5. "Flamingo" (Ed Anderson, Ted Grouya) – 12:29

== Personnel ==
- Archie Shepp – alto sax
- Jaki Byard – piano
- Cecil McBee – bass
- Roy Haynes – drums
