= Flying Out =

Studio album by Cecil McBee
- Released: 1982
- Recorded: 1982 at Sound Heights Studio, Brooklyn, NY
- Genre: Jazz
- Label: India Navigation IN 1053
- Producer: Bob Cummins

Cecil McBee chronology
Compassion (1979)	Flying Out (1982)	Roots of Blue (1986)

Flying Out is an album led by bassist Cecil McBee recorded in 1982 and first released on the India Navigation label.

== Reception ==
Professional ratings
Review scores
Source	Rating
AllMusic	4.5/5 stars
The Rolling Stone Jazz Record Guide	4/5 stars

In his review for AllMusic, Scott Yanow stated that "the advanced music and the blending of the unusual colors works quite well".

== Track listing ==
All compositions by Cecil McBee

1. "First Impression" - 8:54
2. "Truth - A Path to Peace" - 7:19
3. "Into a Fantasy" - 6:45
4. "Flying Out" - 7:12
5. "Blues on the Bottom - 5:41

== Personnel ==
- Cecil McBee - double bass, piano
- Olu Dara - cornet
- John Blake - violin
- David Eyges - cello
- Billy Hart - drums
