= Focus (Chico Freeman album) =

Studio album by Chico Freeman
- Released: 1995
- Recorded: May 16, 1994
- Genre: Jazz
- Length: 61:01
- Label: Contemporary; CCD 14073-2
- Producer: Eric Miller

Chico Freeman chronology
The Unspoken Word (1994)	Focus (1995)	Still Sensitive (1995)

Professional ratings
Review scores
Source	Rating
AllMusic	3.5/5 stars
The Penguin Guide to Jazz Recordings	3.5/4 stars

Focus is an album by the American jazz saxophonist Chico Freeman, featuring Arthur Blythe, recorded in 1994 and released on the Contemporary label.

== Reception ==
The AllMusic review by Alex Henderson stated: "Focus didn't go down in history as one of Freeman's essential works, but it's a generally decent and occasionally excellent CD that he can be proud of".

== Track listing ==
All compositions by Chico Freeman except as indicated

1. "Bemsha Swing" (Denzil Best, Thelonious Monk) - 7:47
2. "Blackfoot" (George Cables) - 6:55
3. "Ah, George, We Hardly Knew Ya" (Don Pullen) - 9:57
4. "To Hear a Tear, Drop in the Rain" - 9:05
5. "Playpen" (Freeman, Ed Maguire) - 8:25
6. "Peacemaker" (Cecil McBee) - 11:41
7. "Rhythm-a-Ning" (Monk) - 8:11

== Personnel ==
- Chico Freeman - tenor saxophone
- Arthur Blythe - alto saxophone
- George Cables - piano
- Santi Debriano - bass
- Yoron Israel - drums
