= Put Sunshine in It =

Studio album by Arthur Blythe
- Released: 1985
- Genre: Jazz, pop jazz
- Label: Columbia
- Producer: Todd Cochran, Bruce Purse

Arthur Blythe chronology
Light Blue: Arthur Blythe Plays Thelonious Monk (1983)	Put Sunshine in It (1985)	Da-Da (1986)

Put Sunshine in It is an album by the American saxophonist Arthur Blythe, released in 1985. The album was regarded as an attempt, at the behest of Blythe's label, Columbia Records, to woo a crossover fusion audience, although Blythe claimed that he was interested in trying a different style of music. Blythe supported the album with live dates, backed by his longtime band.

== Production ==
The album was produced by Todd Cochran, who also played keyboards, and Bruce Purse, who composed many of the songs. Blythe was also backed by Alphonso Johnson on bass, Michael O'Neill on guitar, and Leon "Ndugu" Chancler on drums. Blythe used drum machines and synthesizers on some of the tracks, which incorporated elements of disco and funk. "Sentimental Walk" is an interpretation of the song from the film Diva.

== Critical reception ==
Professional ratings
Review scores
Source	Rating
AllMusic	2/5 stars
Los Angeles Times	2/5 stars
Oakland Tribune	2/4 stars
Omaha World-Herald	3.5/5 stars
The Philadelphia Inquirer	1/4 stars
Valley Advocate	2/5 stars

The Philadelphia Inquirer opined that the "estimable alto saxophonist's desperate attempt to woo the Grover Washington Jr. crowd is a dismal failure even on its own lenient terms". The Omaha World-Herald concluded that "Blythe's slightly off-center sound and fiery, upper-register cries remain, but are somewhat diminished and diluted by elemental funk and ballads." The Globe and Mail said that "Blythe waves lightly at the six nondescript tunes, and his Tweety-Bird tone and high-flying ideas—thin though they are compared to previous efforts—are just enough to carry the music."

The Washington Post called Put Sunshine in It Blythe's worst album, stating that he "gets lost amid bland tunes and fuzak backing". The Buffalo News opined, "So human and urgent is his sound and so tactile his sculpting of melody, that it is profoundly musical, for all its obvious commerciality." The Sun panned the "unimaginative tunes encased in synthetic syrup."

AllMusic labeled the album a "dud" and noted that it was dominated by Cochran.

== Track listing ==
No.	Title	Length
1.	"Tumalumah"
2.	"Put Sunshine in It"
3.	"Uptown Strut"
4.	"Silhouette"
5.	"#5"
6.	"Sentimental Walk (Theme from Diva)"
