= Isotope (album) =

Studio album by Kirk Lightsey Trio
- Released: 1983
- Recorded: February 14, 1983
- Studio: Studio 44, Monster, Holland
- Genre: Jazz
- Length: 55:01 CD reissue with additional track
- Label: Criss Cross Jazz; 1003
- Producer: Gerry Teekens

Kirk Lightsey chronology
Lightsey 1 (1983)	Isotope (1983)	Everything Happens to Me (1983)

CD Cover

Isotope is an album by pianist Kirk Lightsey that was recorded in 1983 and released by the Dutch Criss Cross Jazz label. The 1993 CD reissue included an additional track recorded in 1991.

== Reception ==
Professional ratings
Review scores
Source	Rating
AllMusic	4/5 stars
The Penguin Guide to Jazz Recordings	3.5/4 stars

The AllMusic review states "The strong interplay between the musicians and the interesting material uplift the set above the average trio date".

== Track listing ==
1. "Isotope" (Joe Henderson) – 6:54
2. "Oleo" (Sonny Rollins) – 4:59
3. "Pee Wee" (Tony Williams) – 9:46
4. "Witch Hunt" (Wayne Shorter) – 7:59
5. "A Monk's Dream" (Johnny Griffin) – 5:30
6. "Little Daphne" (Rudolph Johnson) – 12:43
7. "I'll Never Stop Loving You" (Nicholas Brodszky, Sammy Cahn) – 6:40 Bonus track on CD reissue
- Recorded at Studio 44, Monster, Holland on February 14, 1983 (tracks 1–6) and at Sear Sound, New York City on December 13, 1991 (track 7)

== Personnel ==
- Kirk Lightsey – piano
- Jesper Lundgaard – bass
- Eddie Gladden – drums
