= Mutima =

Studio album by Cecil McBee
- Released: 1974
- Recorded: May 8, 1974, at Minot Studios, White Plains, New York
- Genre: Jazz
- Label: Strata-East SES-7417
- Producer: Cecil McBee

Cecil McBee chronology
Mutima (1974)	Alternate Spaces (1977)

Mutima is the debut album led by bassist Cecil McBee recorded in 1974 and first released on the Strata-East label.

== Reception ==
Professional ratings
Review scores
Source	Rating
AllMusic	4/5 stars
The Rolling Stone Jazz Record Guide	3/5 stars

In his review for AllMusic, Michael G. Nastos called it "A landmark recording in early creative improvised modern music" and states "McBee as a pure musician has staggering technique, rich harmonic ideas, and an indefatigable swing, but it is as a composer that he is set apart from other musicians of this mid-'70s era ...Mutima (translated as "unseen forces") undoubtedly solidified his stature and brilliance as a major player".

== Track listing ==
All compositions by Cecil McBee

1. "From Within" – 11:21
2. "Voice of the 7th Angel" – 2:02
3. "Life Waves" – 9:13
4. "Mutima" – 13:41
5. "A Feeling" – 2:38
6. "Tulsa Black" – 6:10

== Personnel ==
- Cecil McBee – bass
- Tex Allen – trumpet, flugelhorn (tracks 2–6)
- Art Webb – flute (tracks 2 & 4–6)
- Allen Braufman – alto saxophone (tracks 2–6)
- George Adams – tenor saxophone, soprano saxophone (tracks 2–6)
- Onaje Allen Gumbs – piano, electric piano (tracks 2–6)
- Jimmy Hopps – drums (tracks 2–6)
- Jabali Billy Hart – cymbal, percussion (tracks 2 & 4–6)
- Lawrence Killian – congas (tracks 2 & 4–6)
- Michael Carvin – gong, percussion (tracks 2 & 4–6)
- Dee Dee Bridgewater – vocals (track 2)
- Cecil McBee, Jr. – electric bass (track 6)
- Allen Nelson – drums (track 5)
