= Exhale (Arthur Blythe album) =

Studio album by Arthur Blythe
- Released: June 17, 2003
- Recorded: October 14, 2002
- Studio: Tedesco Studio, Paramus, NJ
- Genre: Jazz
- Length: 65:35
- Label: Savant; SCD 2050
- Producer: Cecil Brooks III

Arthur Blythe chronology
Focus (2002)	Exhale (2003)

Exhale, is the final album by saxophonist Arthur Blythe which was recorded in 2002 and released on the Savant label the following year.

== Reception ==
Professional ratings
Review scores
Source	Rating
AllMusic	4.5/5 stars
The Guardian	4/5 stars
The Penguin Guide to Jazz	3/4 stars

In his review on AllMusic, arwulf arwulf called it an "enjoyable album". In JazzTimes, John Litweiler wrote: "the leader himself casts a peculiarly gloomy, out-of-character spell. Blythe’s strengths-big sound, aggressive attack and bright melodic imagination-are best at up tempos and on pieces with chord changes, wherein the active harmonic structure lends shape to his frequently discontinuous lines. Exhale has too many slow tempos and one-chord pieces; moreover, his sound now is limpid and his attack laid-back ... Exhale must have simply been a bad day". In The Guardian, John Fordham observed "Not perfect playing, but very compelling music from a unique improviser, and the strange group sound grows on you".

== Track listing ==
All compositions by Arthur Blythe except where noted

1. "Cousin Mary" (John Coltrane) – 5:20
2. "Come Sunday" (Duke Ellington) – 6:16
3. "Exhaust Suite: Nonette" (Bob Stewart) – 3:16
4. "Exhaust Suite: Surrender" – 4:10
5. "Exhaust Suite: LC" – 1:15
6. "Exhaust Suite: Phase Two" – 2:31
7. "Night Train" (Jimmy Forrest, Oscar Washington) – 6:14
8. "7/4 Thang" – 3:54
9. "Equinox" (Coltrane) – 9:10
10. "Just Friends" (John Klenner, Sam M. Lewis) – 4:28
11. "CJ" (Stewart) – 5:26
12. "All Blues" (Miles Davis) – 8:38
13. "Straighten Up and Fly Right" (Nat King Cole, Irving Mills) – 4:04
14. "Exhale" – 0:53

== Personnel ==
- Arthur Blythe – alto saxophone
- Bob Stewart – tuba
- John Hicks – piano, organ
- Cecil Brooks III – drums
