= Two Tenor Winner =

Studio album by Clifford Jordan Quintet with Junior Cook
- Released: 1985
- Recorded: October 1, 1984
- Studio: Studio 44, Monster, Holland
- Genre: Jazz
- Length: 49:29
- Label: Criss Cross Jazz; 1011
- Producer: Gerry Teekens

Clifford Jordan chronology
Dr. Chicago (1984)	Two Tenor Winner (1985)	The Rotterdam Session (1985)

Two Tenor Winner is an album by saxophonist Clifford Jordan's Quintet with Junior Cook which was recorded in the Netherlands in 1984 and released on the Dutch Criss Cross Jazz label.

== Reception ==
Professional ratings
Review scores
Source	Rating
Allmusic	4/5 stars
The Penguin Guide to Jazz Recordings	3/4 stars

In his review on Allmusic, Scott Yanow called it "High-quality hard bop with a bit of competitiveness resulting in some fiery moments"

== Track listing ==
1. "Half and Half" (Charles Davis) - 9:46
2. "Song of Her" (Cecil McBee) - 5:05
3. "Groovin' High" (Dizzy Gillespie) - 9:56
4. "The Water Bearer" (Kirk Lightsey) - 8:05
5. "Make the Man Love Me" (Dorothy Fields, Arthur Schwartz) - 6:10
6. "Two Tenor Winner" (Charles Mims, Jr.) - 7:21
7. "Doug's Prelude" (Clifford Jordan) - 2:43

== Personnel ==
- Clifford Jordan, Junior Cook - tenor saxophone
- Kirk Lightsey - piano
- Cecil McBee - bass
- Eddie Gladden - drums
