= Mr. B (album) =

Studio album by Chet Baker Trio
- Released: 1984
- Recorded: May 25, 1983
- Studios: Studio 44, Monster, Holland
- Genre: Jazz
- Length: 46:02 CD release with bonus tracks
- Labels: Timeless; SJP 192
- Producer: Wim Wigt

Chet Baker chronology
| Everything Happens to Me (1984) | Mr. B (1984) | The Improviser (1984) |

Mr. B is an album by trumpeter Chet Baker which was recorded in 1983 and released on the Dutch Timeless label.

== Reception ==
Professional ratings
Review scores
| Source | Rating |
|---|---|
| Allmusic | 4/5 stars |

The Allmusic review states "There is a sadness permeating the trumpeter's sound throughout, exacerbated by the lazy, sometimes sluggish, tempos. A deep and touching beauty can be felt, marking this as one of Chet's best from the period".

== Track listing ==
1. "Dolphin Dance" (Herbie Hancock) – 6:23
2. "Ellen and David" (Charlie Haden) – 6:18
3. "Strollin'" (Horace Silver) – 7:24
4. "In Your Own Sweet Way" (Dave Brubeck) – 7:17
5. "Mister B" (Hal Galper) – 4:08
6. "Beatrice" (Sam Rivers) – 4:49
7. "White Blues" (Michel Graillier) – 5:02 Bonus track on CD release
8. "Father X-Mas" (Graillier) – 5:01 Bonus track on CD release

== Personnel ==
- Chet Baker – trumpet
- Michel Graillier – piano
- Riccardo del Fra – bass
- Philip Catherine – guitar (track 8)
