= Lightsey 1 =

Studio album by Kirk Lightsey
- Released: 1983
- Recorded: September 22 and October 5, 1982
- Studio: Penthouse Recordings, New York, NY
- Genre: Jazz
- Length: 38:39
- Label: Sunnyside; SSC 1002
- Producer: François Zalacain

Kirk Lightsey chronology
Habiba (1974)	Lightsey 1 (1983)	Isotope (1983)

Lightsey 1 is a solo album by pianist Kirk Lightsey that was recorded in 1982 and released by the Sunnyside label.

== Reception ==
Professional ratings
Review scores
Source	Rating
Allmusic	4.5/5 stars

The Allmusic review states "Long a top interpreter of modern mainstream jazz, pianist Kirk Lightsey was well recorded by the new Sunnyside label in the early 1980s ... The pianist is in top form throughout the well-paced program".

== Track listing ==
1. "Fee-Fi-Fo-Fum" (Wayne Shorter) – 4:35
2. "Habiba" (Kirk Lightsey) – 5:23
3. "Trinkle Tinkle" (Thelonious Monk) – 5:45
4. "Moon Ra" (David Durrah) – 3:46
5. "Fresh Air" (Lightsey) – 6:13
6. "Wild Flower" (Shorter) – 7:00
7. "Never Let Me Go" (Jay Livingston, Ray Evans) – 5:18

== Personnel ==
- Kirk Lightsey – piano, flute
