= Unspoken (Cecil McBee album) =

Studio album by Cecil McBee
- Released: 1997
- Recorded: October 20, 1996
- Studio: Sound on Sound, New York City
- Genre: Jazz
- Length: 47:43
- Label: Palmetto; PM 2023

Cecil McBee chronology
Roots of Blue (1986)	Unspoken (1997)	Tribal Ghost (2013)

Unspoken is an album by the Cecil McBee Band, led by double bassist Cecil McBee, who is joined by saxophonist Randall Connors, trumpeter James Zollar, pianist David Berkman, and drummer Matt Wilson. Featuring eight compositions by McBee, it was recorded on October 20, 1996, at Sound on Sound in New York City, and was released in 1997 by Palmetto Records.

== Reception ==
Professional ratings
Review scores
Source	Rating
AllMusic	4/5 stars
The Penguin Guide to Jazz	3/4 stars
The Rolling Stone Jazz & Blues Album Guide	4/5 stars

In a review for AllMusic, Scott Yanow wrote: "Rather than being a showcase for his distinctive bass solos, the set is most significant for featuring eight of McBee's diverse originals... The high musicianship and consistent inventiveness of Cecil McBee and his sidemen (along with the interesting tunes) make this a CD worth picking up."

The authors of The Penguin Guide to Jazz Recordings noted that the musicians "sound well rehearsed but not overprepared," and stated: "McBee doesn't feature himself any more often than seems appropriate, but his broad, chocolatey tone dominates the ensembles."

Rick Bruner of All About Jazz commented: "The focus is on the tunes and the band. McBee lets his band mates shine on his excellent compositions. Unspoken is a satisfying statement from a true jazz legend and his talented sidemen."

Noting that McBee has rarely appeared as a band leader, a writer for The Oklahoman remarked: "Unspoken is a most appropriate name for this superb album - one of the best we've reviewed so far this year... this tenacious album... is not only worth the wait, it also offers a rare chance to hear the unspoken personal thoughts and feelings of a true artist."

== Track listing ==
Composed by Cecil McBee

1. "Pantamime" – 5:15
2. "Unspoken" – 8:57
3. "Catfish" – 5:47
4. "Sleeping Giant" – 5:43
5. "Lucia" – 5:13
6. "Inside Out" – 3:30
7. "Slippin'n Slidin'" – 6:17
8. "Tight Squeeze" – 7:01

== Personnel ==
- Cecil McBee – double bass
- Randall Connors – alto saxophone
- James Zollar – trumpet
- David Berkman – piano
- Matt Wilson – drums
