= Tribal Ghost =

2013 saxophonists live album

Live album by John Tchicai, Charlie Kohlhase, Garrison Fewell, Cecil McBee, Billy Hart
- Released: 2013
- Recorded: February 9 and 10, 2007
- Venue: Birdland, New York City
- Genre: Free jazz
- Label: NoBusiness; NBLP 65
- Producer: Danas Mikailionis, Garrison Fewell, Valerij Anosov

John Tchicai chronology
West Africa Tour (Sierra Leone, Liberia & Guinea), April 1985 (2012)	Tribal Ghost (2013)	Clapham Duos (2015)

Cecil McBee chronology
Unspoken (1997)	Tribal Ghost (2013)

Tribal Ghost is a live album by saxophonists John Tchicai and Charlie Kohlhase, guitarist Garrison Fewell, bassist Cecil McBee, and drummer Billy Hart. It was recorded on February 9 and 10, 2007, at Birdland in New York City, and was released on vinyl in limited quantities in 2013 by NoBusiness Records.

== Reception ==
Professional ratings
Review scores
Source	Rating
The Free Jazz Collective	4.5/5 stars
The Free Jazz Collective	5/5 stars
All About Jazz	4.5/5 stars
All About Jazz	4.5/5 stars
Tom Hull – on the Web	A−

In a review for The Free Jazz Collective, Martin Schray described Tribal Ghost as "an outstanding album breathing the spirit of jazz history with every tone," and called Tchicai's "Llanto del Indio" "the highlight of the album," "innocent and tender, one of these musical moments you want to last forever." Another FJC reviewer stated that "the overall consistency of sound and quality throughout the album is amazing," while "the entire band is excellent." He commented: "It is a kind of down to earth, more human, more humanistic approach to Coltrane's exploration of the universe. It is tribal as the title suggests, yet then of the introspective rather than the exuberant kind."

Writing for The New York Times, Nate Chinen noted that the rapport between the two saxophonists "feels warm and unforced," and wrote: "The rhythm section maintains its composure throughout the album, simmering and smoking aplenty but never quite surrendering to flame."

Glenn Astarita of All About Jazz stated that the album is "unique from a perspective that includes sojourns into the avant jazz space, while containing memorably melodic themes, often standing as reference points amid the all-star group's improvisational dialogues." AAJ's John Sharpe remarked: "the restrained passion and simmering interplay of the ensemble form the main talking point here. There's no showboating. Everyone focuses on what the music needs to succeed."

In an article for Metropolis, Tim Niland called the ensemble "a cooperative group where no one dominates," and wrote: "This is a fine collective album, quiet and thoughtful, played at a summering level which allows space for all voices to be heard."

== Track listing ==
Track timings not provided.

Side A

1. "Tribal Ghost" (Garrison Fewell )
2. "The Queen of Ra" (Garrison Fewell )

Side B

1. "Dark Matter" (Garrison Fewell )
2. "Llanto del Indio" (John Tchicai)

== Personnel ==
- John Tchicai – tenor saxophone, bass clarinet
- Charlie Kohlhase – alto saxophone, tenor saxophone, baritone saxophone
- Garrison Fewell – guitar and percussion
- Cecil McBee – bass
- Billy Hart – drums
