= Kirk 'n Marcus =

Studio album by Kirk Lightsey Quintet featuring Marcus Belgrave
- Released: 1987
- Recorded: December 24 & 26, 1986
- Studio: Van Gelder Studio, Englewood Cliffs, NJ
- Genre: Jazz
- Length: 55:08 CD reissue with additional track
- Label: Criss Cross Jazz; 1030
- Producer: Gerry Teekens

Kirk Lightsey chronology
First Affairs (1987)	Kirk 'n Marcus (1987)	Temptation (1987)

Kirk 'n Marcus is an album by pianist Kirk Lightsey's Quintet featuring Marcus Belgrave that was recorded in 1986 and released by the Dutch Criss Cross Jazz label. The CD release included two additional tracks.

== Reception ==
Professional ratings
Review scores
Source	Rating
Allmusic	4/5 stars
The Penguin Guide to Jazz Recordings	3/4 stars

The Allmusic review states "The modern hard bop date has plenty of fine solos and is easily recommended to straight-ahead jazz collectors".

== Track listing ==
1. "All My Love" (Marcus Belgrave) – 6:34
2. "Loves I Once Knew" (David Durrah) – 6:41
3. "Windmill" (Kenny Dorham) – 8:46
4. "Marcus' Mates" (Robert Pipho) – 5:13
5. "Golden Legacy" (Santi Debriano) – 6:39
6. "Lower Bridge Level" (Jean Toussaint) – 5:36
7. "Lolita" (D. Jenkins) – 6:42 Additional track on CD release
8. "Fixed Wing" (Santi Debriano) – 8:30 Additional track on CD release

== Personnel ==
- Kirk Lightsey – piano
- Marcus Belgrave – trumpet, flugelhorn
- Jean Toussaint – tenor saxophone
- Santi Debriano – bass
- Eddie Gladden – drums
