= Steve Reid =

American jazz drummer (1944–2010)

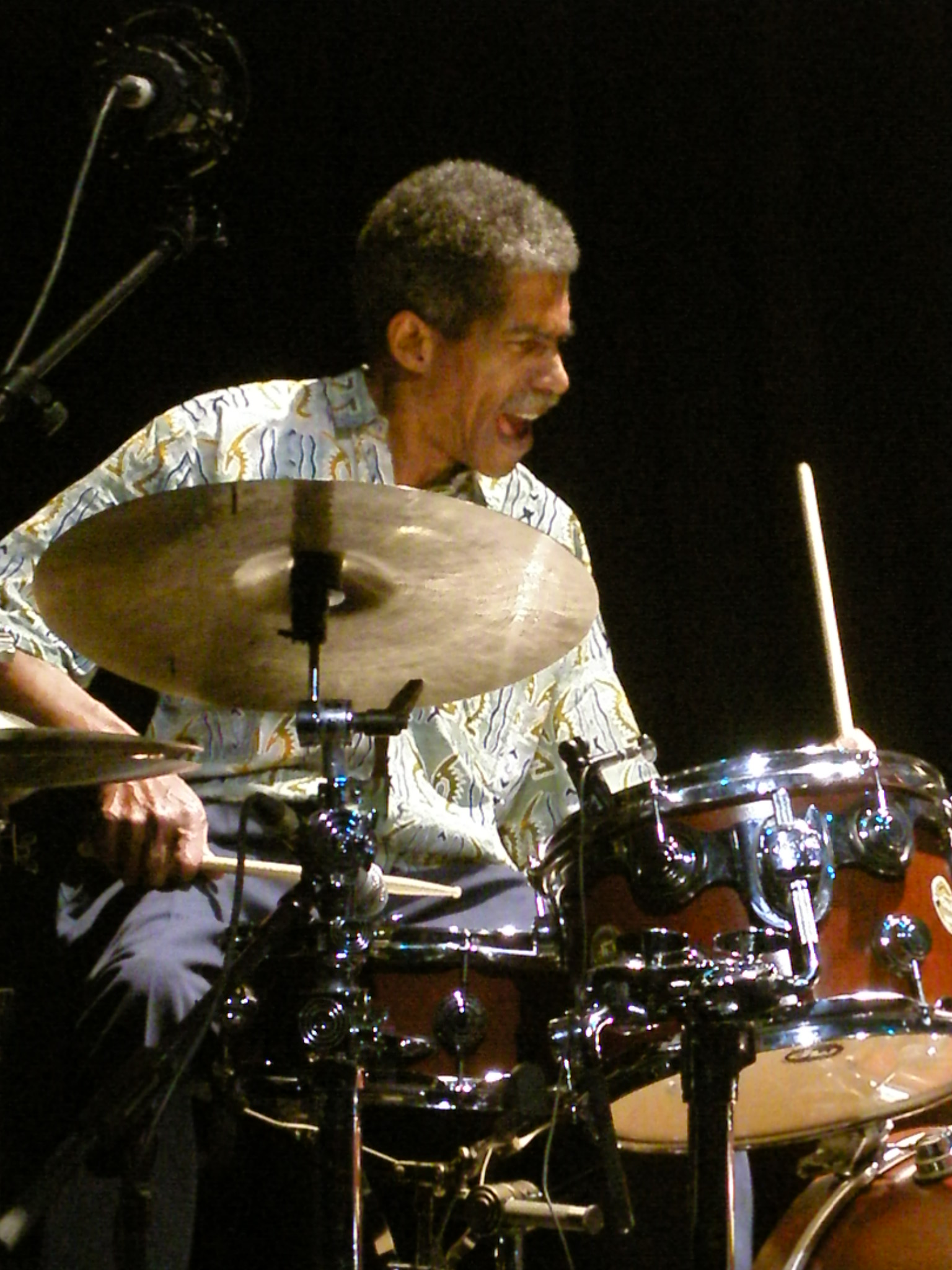
- Reid performing in Madrid in 2008

Background information
- Born: January 29, 1944; The Bronx, New York, U.S.
- Died: April 13, 2010 (aged 66) New York City
- Genres: Jazz, avant-garde jazz, free jazz
- Occupation: Musician
- Instrument: Drums
- Years active: 1960–2009
- Labels: Motown, Mustevic, Domino
- Website: steve-reid.com at the Wayback Machine (archived 6 April 2010)

Steve Reid (January 29, 1944 – April 13, 2010) was an American jazz drummer who played with Ornette Coleman, James Brown, Fela Kuti, Kieran Hebden, and Sun Ra. He worked as a session drummer for Motown.

== Biography ==
Born in the South Bronx, Reid started drumming at 16. His family moved to Queens, New York, three blocks away from John Coltrane. Before attending Adelphi University in Garden City, New York, he worked as part of the Apollo Theatre House Band and recorded with Martha and the Vandellas under the direction of Quincy Jones.

In 1969, Reid refused to register for the draft during the Vietnam War. He was arrested as a conscientious objector and sentenced to a four-year prison sentence at Lewisburg Federal Penitentiary, where he served with Jimmy Hoffa. After his release on parole in 1971, Reid found work as a session musician with Dionne Warwick, Horace Silver, Charles Tyler, Sun Ra, and Freddie Hubbard, in addition to Broadway stage work.

In 1974, Reid formed the Legendary Master Brotherhood and his record label, Mustevic Sound.

He lived in Lugano, Switzerland, for several years in later life and released several recordings for the English label Soul Jazz and the German label CPR. For his final albums, his band included Chuck Henderson (soprano saxophone), Boris Netsvetaev (piano), and Chris Lachotta (double-bass).

In 2006, Reid and electronic musician Kieran Hebden, recorded the experimental album The Exchange Session Vol. 1. The duo enjoyed this collaboration so much that they recorded three more albums: The Exchange Session Vol. 2 (2006), Tongues (2007), and NYC (2008). In an interview, Reid referred to Hebden as his "musical soul mate".

On April 13, 2010, Reid died in New York of throat cancer.

== Discography ==
=== As leader ===
- Rhythmatism (Mustevic, 1976)
- Nova (Mustevic, 1976)
- Odyssey of the Oblong Square (Mustevic, 1977)
- Raw Material with Per Henrik Wallin, Kevin Ross (Dragon, 1983)
- A Drum Story (Altrisuoni, 2001)
- Waves (C. P., 2003)
- Spirit Walk (Soul Jazz, 2005)
- Daxaar (Recorded in Africa) (Domino, 2007)

With Kieran Hebden

- The Exchange Session Vol. 1 (Domino, 2006)
- The Exchange Session Vol. 2 (Domino, 2006)
- Tongues (Domino, 2007)
- NYC (Domino, 2008)
- Live at the South Bank (Smalltown Superjazzz, 2011)

=== As sideman ===
With Arthur Blythe

- The Grip (India Navigation, 1977)
- Metamorphosis (India Navigation, 1979)

With James Brown

- The Popcorn (1969)

With Ted Daniel

- In the Beginning (Altura, 1975)

With Fela Ransome Kuti

- Africa One

With Frank Lowe

- Fresh (1975)
- Out Loud (2014)

With Martha and the Vandellas

- "Dancing in the Street" (Motown, 1964)

With Charles Tyler

- Voyage from Jericho (1975)
- Live in Europe (Umea, 1977)
- Saga of the Outlaws (Nessa, 1978)
- Folk and Mystery Stories (Sonet, 1980)
- Definite Volume 1 (Storyville, 1982)
- Definite Volume 2 (Storyville, 1984)
- At WKCR (2014)

With others

- Lorraine Feather, The Body Remembers (Bean Bag, 1996)
- Jackiem Joyner, Lil' Man Soul (Artistry, 2009)
