= Focus (Arthur Blythe album) =

Studio album by Arthur Blythe
- Released: July 30, 2002
- Recorded: April 11, 2002
- Studios: Tedesco, Paramus, NJ
- Genre: Jazz
- Length: 65:35
- Labels: Savant; SCD 2044
- Producer: Cecil Brooks III

Arthur Blythe chronology
Blythe Byte (2001)	Focus (2002)	Exhale (2003)

Focus, is an album by saxophonist Arthur Blythe, recorded in 2002 and released on the Savant label the following year.

== Reception ==
Professional ratings
Review scores
Source	Rating
AllMusic	4/5 stars
The Penguin Guide to Jazz	3.5/4 stars

In his review on AllMusic, Scott Yanow stated: " In grooves ranging from New Orleans to R&B-ish, along with freer explorations, this is a continually colorful set of high-quality music". On All About Jazz, Jon Wagner noted: "Focus sounds like it could have been conceived and recorded by some of the new crop of "downtown" musicians. The spare instrumentation and simple, elegant compositions sound fresh, relevant and forward-looking. But there's also a patina of maturity and self-assuredness that sets Focus apart from rawer, more experimental downtown sounds. That's because the musicians - supported on some tracks by special guest William Tsilis on concert grand marimba - have arrived at their maturity and self-assuredness through decades of experimental efforts. They've spent careers redefining jazz, and the fruits of their labor result in music that is relaxed and understated, yet emotive and powerful".

In JazzTimes, David Franklin wrote: "The primary attribute that distinguishes Arthur Blythe’s Focus is its sound. First there’s Blythe’s unique alto tone. Room filling and reedy (you can almost hear the individual vibrations) and ornamented by a quick, rhythmic vibrato, Blythe’s muscular sound identifies him immediately. Then there’s the quartet’s unusual instrumentation: tuba in place of string bass and marimba instead of piano. This special combination of sonic properties sets the recording apart from many others offering a similar stylistic approach. For aside from the extra latitude Bob Stewart’s tuba affords him in generating imaginative bass lines, the playing is essentially mainstream and straightahead".

== Track listing ==
All compositions by Arthur Blythe except where noted

1. "Opus" – 6:52
2. "Children's Song a.k.a. That Old Man" (Thelonious Monk) – 3:18
3. "C.C. Rider" (Traditional) – 4:58
4. "Once Again" – 2:53
5. "My Son Ra" – 8:09
6. "Hip Toe" – 6:20
7. "Night Song" – 6:50
8. "Bubbles" – 3:16
9. "Stuffy Turkey" (Monk) – 5:00
10. "Night Creeper" – 5:19
11. "In a Sentimental Mood" (Duke Ellington, Manny Kurtz, Irving Mills) – 7:58
12. "Focus" – 1:16

== Personnel ==
- Arthur Blythe – alto saxophone
- Gust William Tsilis – marimba
- Bob Stewart – tuba
- Cecil Brooks III – drums
