= Spirits in the Field =

Live album by Arthur Blythe
- Released: February 15, 2000
- Recorded: June 24, 1999
- Venue: Bimhuis, Amsterdam
- Genre: Jazz
- Length: 57:46
- Label: Savant; SCD 2024
- Producer: Cecil Brooks III

Arthur Blythe chronology
Today's Blues (1997)	Spirits in the Field (2000)	Blythe Byte (2001)

Spirits in the Field, is a live album by saxophonist Arthur Blythe, recorded at Bimhuis in Amsterdam in 1999 and released on the Savant label the following year.

== Reception ==
Professional ratings
Review scores
Source	Rating
AllMusic	3/5 stars
The Penguin Guide to Jazz	3/4 stars

In his review on AllMusic, Michael G. Nastos stated: "Blythe's husky, virile alto sax has never sounded better, and though the recording quality is a little thin, the music comes roaring through the speakers nonetheless... Blythe's sound and vision remain as fresh and vital as ever." In JazzTimes, Peter Margasak wrote: "this live recording puts the focus squarely on his music, finding it as strong, soulful and thrilling as ever."

== Track listing ==
All compositions by Arthur Blythe except where noted

1. "One Mint Julip" (Rudy Toombs) – 6:33
2. "Miss Nancy" – 7:26
3. "Odessa" – 10:59
4. "Rambler" (Bob Stewart) – 9:29
5. "Spirits in the Field" – 3:24
6. "Lenox Avenue Breakdown" – 6:37
7. "Ah, George, We Hardly Knew Ya" (Don Pullen) – 7:23
8. "Break Tune" – 5:55

== Personnel ==
- Arthur Blythe – alto saxophone
- Bob Stewart – tuba
- Cecil Brooks III – drums
