= Everything Happens to Me (Kirk Lightsey and Chet Baker album) =

Studio album by Kirk Lightsey Trio with Chet Baker
- Released: 1984
- Recorded: March 14, 1983
- Studio: Studio 44, Monster, Holland
- Genre: Jazz
- Length: 40:34
- Label: Timeless; SJP 176
- Producer: Wim Wigt

Kirk Lightsey chronology
| Isotope (1983) | Everything Happens to Me (1984) | Shorter by Two (1984) |

Chet Baker chronology
| Quintessence Volume 2 (1983) | Everything Happens to Me (1984) | Mr. B (1984) |

Everything Happens to Me, is an album by pianist Kirk Lightsey's Trio with trumpeter Chet Baker, that was recorded in 1983 and released by the Timeless label.

== Reception ==
Professional ratings
Review scores
| Source | Rating |
|---|---|
| Allmusic | 4/5 stars |

The Allmusic review states "While Baker is not in top form, he is a fine complement to the group sound ... A largely uneventful, if nonetheless relaxingly swinging set, Lightsey deftly walks through the chords with consummate skill. An underrated performer, the pianist is a skillful interpreter of American song, a performer who understands the meanings of tunes and infuses them with his own interpretations. Not terribly innovative, Lightsey is one of those few serious mainstream jazz piano soloists who pushes the edges ever so slightly but feels comfortable smack dab in the middle of traditional interplay". In JazzTimes, Michael J. West wrote "Even the conscientious jazz collector might have missed Shorter by Two upon its original 1984 release, performed as it was by Kirk Lightsey and Harold Danko, two of the most underrated pianists in jazz then and now. But 33 years later, Wayne Shorter having assumed elder statesmanship and acclaim as jazz's greatest living composer, the music therein has greater prestige even as its players continue to get shortchanged".

== Track listing ==
1. "Ray's Idea" (Ray Brown) – 4:52
2. "Everything Happens to Me" (Tom Adair, Matt Dennis) – 10:45
3. "Girl with the Purple Eyes" (Dexter Gordon) – 6:08
4. "Speak No Evil" (Wayne Shorter) – 6:57
5. "Inner Urge" (Joe Henderson) – 5:00
6. "Fee-Fi-Fo-Fum" (Shorter) – 6:52

== Personnel ==
- Kirk Lightsey – piano
- Chet Baker – trumpet, vocals (tracks 1 & 2)
- David Eubanks – bass
- Eddie Gladden – drums
