= Illusions (Arthur Blythe album) =

Studio album by Arthur Blythe
- Released: 1980
- Recorded: April–May 1980
- Genre: Jazz
- Length: 36:09
- Label: Columbia
- Producers: Jim Fishel, Arthur Blythe

Arthur Blythe chronology
Lenox Avenue Breakdown (1979)	Illusions (1980)	Blythe Spirit (1981)

Illusions is jazz saxophonist Arthur Blythe's third album for the Columbia label, recorded in New York City in 1980.

== Reception ==
Professional ratings
Review scores
Source	Rating
AllMusic	4/5 stars
The Rolling Stone Jazz Record Guide	5/5 stars

From contemporary reviews, Robert Palmer placed the album at fifth place in his best of 1980 list for The New York Times, proclaiming Blythe to be a "formidable alto saxophonist" and that the funk tunes on the album "proved that substantial yet danceable jazz isn't an impossible dream."

From retrospective reviews, Scott Yanow of AllMusic states that "the distinctive alto of Blythe is heard in top form on six of his unusual originals ... It's recommended."

== Track listing ==
All compositions by Arthur Blythe

1. "Bush Baby" - 6:28
2. "Miss Nancy" - 7:24
3. "Illusions" - 4:10
4. "My Son Ra" - 5:59
5. "Carespin' with Mamie" - 7:04
6. "As of Yet" - 5:04

- Recorded at CBS Recording Studios, New York, in April and May 1980.

== Personnel ==
- Arthur Blythe – alto saxophone
- Abdul Wadud – cello (tracks 1, 3 & 5)
- James Blood Ulmer – guitar (tracks 1, 3 & 5)
- Bob Stewart – tuba (tracks 1, 3 & 5)
- John Hicks – piano (tracks 2, 4 & 6)
- Fred Hopkins – bass (tracks 2, 4 & 6)
- Bobby Battle (tracks 1, 3 & 5), Steve McCall (tracks 2, 4 & 6) – drums
