= The Grip =

Live album by Arthur Blythe
- Released: 1977
- Recorded: February 26, 1977
- Genre: Jazz
- Label: India Navigation

Arthur Blythe chronology
The Grip (1977)	Metamorphosis (1977)

The Grip is a live debut album by jazz saxophonist Arthur Blythe, recorded at the Brook, in New York City, in 1977 and released on the India Navigation label. The album was released on CD as a compilation with Metamorphosis which was recorded at the same concert.

== Reception ==
Professional ratings
Review scores
Source	Rating
AllMusic	4/5 stars
DownBeat	4/5 stars
The Rolling Stone Jazz Record Guide	5/5 stars

The AllMusic review by Eugene Chadbourne states: "Jazz listeners who want to get 'lost in space' can consider this tasty slab of late-'70s indie jazz akin to a ticket on the Mars shuttle. Arthur Blythe and his associates on this record occupied one of the more spirited creative edges of the New York free jazz scene. The energy and determination with which the group plays is in itself an aspect that can make the sounds of other groups appear somewhat mummified".

== Track listing ==
All compositions by Arthur Blythe except as indicated

1. "The Grip" - 7:15
2. "Spirits in the Field" (Frank Lowe) - 8:36
3. "Sunrise Service" - 7:54
4. "Lower Nile" - 4:02
5. "As of Yet" - 12:37
6. "My Son Ra" - 3:22

- Recorded at the Brook in New York City on February 26, 1977.

== Personnel ==
- Arthur Blythe – alto saxophone
- Abdul Wadud – cello
- Ahmed Abdullah – trumpet
- Bob Stewart – tuba
- Steve Reid – drums
- Muhamad Abdullah – percussion
