= Tongues (Kieran Hebden and Steve Reid album) =

Studio album by Kieran Hebden and Steve Reid
- Released: 19 March 2007
- Recorded: 6–7 February 2006
- Genre: Jazz, electronic
- Length: 44:44
- Label: Domino
- Producer: Kieran Hebden

Kieran Hebden and Steve Reid chronology
The Exchange Session Vol. 2 (2006)	Tongues (2007)	NYC (2008)

Professional ratings
Aggregate scores
Source	Rating
Metacritic	67/100 link
Review scores
Source	Rating
Twisted Ear	link
Pitchfork Media	(4.2/10) link
Allmusic	link

Tongues is a 2007 album by Kieran Hebden and Steve Reid.

== Track listing ==
All tracks composed by Kieran Hebden and Steve Reid; except where indicated

1. "The Sun Never Sets" – 5:50
2. "Brain" – 3:48
3. "Our Time" – 5:04
4. "People Be Happy" – 4:42
5. "Greensleeves" (Traditional; arranged by Hebden and Reid) - 2:39
6. "Rhythm Dance" – 6:51
7. "Mirrors" – 3:11
8. "The Squid" – 4:12
9. "Superheroes" – 4:25
10. "Left Handed, Left Minded" – 4:05

== Personnel ==
- Kieran Hebden – samples, electronics and guitar
- Steve Reid – drums and percussion
