= NYC (album) =

Studio album by Kieran Hebden and Steve Reid
- Released: 18 November 2008
- Genre: Jazz, electronic
- Length: 41:58
- Label: Domino Records
- Producer: Kieran Hebden

Kieran Hebden and Steve Reid chronology
Tongues (2007)	NYC (2008)

Professional ratings
Aggregate scores
Source	Rating
Metacritic	61/100 link
Review scores
Source	Rating
Pitchfork Media	(6.8/10) link
Allmusic	link

NYC is an album by Kieran Hebden and Steve Reid. Hebden and Reid had previously collaborated on three studio albums, with NYC becoming their final release before Reid's death in 2010. Inspiration for the album came from Reid's home city, with the two musicians meeting to record the music over two days in February 2008 at New York's Avatar Studios. The album was released by Domino Records in November 2008.

== Track listing ==
All tracks composed by Kieren Hebden and Steve Reid

1. "Lyman Place" – 7:05
2. "1st & 1st" – 6:16
3. "25th Street" – 6:28
4. "Arrival" – 9:23
5. "Between B & C" – 5:46
6. "Departure" – 7:14

== Personnel ==
- Kieran Hebden – samples, electronics and guitar
- Steve Reid – drums and percussion
