= Metamorphosis (Arthur Blythe album) =

Live album by Arthur Blythe
- Released: 1979
- Recorded: February 26, 1977
- Genre: Jazz
- Label: India Navigation

Arthur Blythe chronology
The Grip (1977)	Metamorphosis (1979)	Bush Baby (1977)

Metamorphosis is a live album by jazz saxophonist Arthur Blythe, recorded at the Brook, New York City, in 1977 and released in 1979 on the India Navigation label. The album was released on CD as a compilation with The Grip, which was recorded at the same concert.

== Reception ==
The AllMusic review by Scott Yanow stated that the album "features the distinctive altoist Arthur Blythe fairly early in his career".

Professional ratings
Review scores
Source	Rating
AllMusic	4/5 stars
DownBeat	4/5 stars
The Rolling Stone Jazz Record Guide	4/5 stars

== Track listing ==
All compositions by Arthur Blythe

1. "Duet for Two" - 17:51
2. "Metamorphosis" - 8:00
3. "Shadows" - 7:40

- Recorded at the Brook in New York City on February 26, 1977.

== Personnel ==
- Arthur Blythe – alto saxophone
- Abdul Wadud – cello
- Ahmed Abdullah – trumpet (tracks 2 & 3)
- Bob Stewart – tuba (tracks 2 & 3)
- Steve Reid – drums (tracks 2 & 3)
- Muhamad Abdullah – percussion (tracks 2 & 3)
