= Lightsey 2 =

Studio album by Kirk Lightsey
- Released: June 1984
- Recorded: September 22, 1982 and August 19, 1983
- Studio: Penthouse Recordings, New York, NY
- Genre: Jazz
- Label: Sunnyside; SSC 1005
- Producer: François Zalacain

Kirk Lightsey chronology
Shorter by Two (1984)	Lightsey 2 (1984)	The Nights of Bradley's (1985)

Lightsey 2 is a solo album by pianist Kirk Lightsey (with one track featuring vocalist Roselyn Burrough) that was recorded in 1982 and 1983 and released by the Sunnyside label.

== Reception ==
Professional ratings
Review scores
Source	Rating
Allmusic	4.5/5 stars

The Allmusic review states "pianist Kirk Lightsey performs eight stimulating piano solos. The emphasis is on modern jazz originals, including tunes by Tony Williams, Wayne Shorter, Sonny Rollins and Phil Woods ("Goodbye Mr. Evans") plus three of Lightsey's own tunes. In addition, singer Roslyn Burrough makes a guest appearance on "You Are So Beautiful." Excellent music".

== Track listing ==
All compositions by Kirk Lightsey except where noted

1. "Pee Wee" (Tony Williams) – 4:08
2. "Speak No Evil" (Wayne Shorter) – 5:18
3. "Oleo" (Sonny Rollins) – 2:43
4. "Come Rain or Come Shine" (Harold Arlen, Johnny Mercer) – 5:15
5. "Water Bearer" – 3:55
6. "You Are So Beautiful" (Billy Preston, Bruce Fisher) – 5:47
7. "Everything Is Changed" – 5:35
8. "Heaven Dance" – 3:45
9. "Goodbye Mr. Evans" (Phil Woods) – 7:42
- Recorded at Penthouse Recordings, New York City on September 22, 1982 (tracks 1, 2, 4 & 5) and August 19, 1983 (tracks 3 & 6–8)

== Personnel ==
- Kirk Lightsey – piano
- Roselyn Burrough – vocals (track 6)
