= Warriors (jazz album) =

Studio album by Don Pullen, Chico Freeman, Fred Hopkins & Bobby Battle
- Released: 1978
- Recorded: April 1978
- Genre: Jazz
- Length: 51:33
- Label: Black Saint
- Producer: Giacomo Pellicciotti

Don Pullen chronology
Montreux Concert (1977)	Warriors (1978)	Milano Strut (1978)

Warriors is an album by American jazz pianist Don Pullen, saxophonist Chico Freeman, bassist Fred Hopkins and drummer Bobby Battle recorded in 1978 for the Italian Black Saint label.

== Reception ==
The Allmusic review awarded the album 4 stars.

Professional ratings
Review scores
Source	Rating
Allmusic	4/5 stars
The Penguin Guide to Jazz Recordings	3.5/4 stars

== Track listing ==
All compositions by Don Pullen

1. "Warriors Dance: Little Don" - 31:11
2. "Land of the Pharaohs" - 13:40

- Recorded at Barigozzi Studio in Milano, Italy in April 1978

== Personnel ==
- Don Pullen - piano
- Chico Freeman - saxophone
- Fred Hopkins - bass
- Bobby Battle - drums
