= The Exchange Session Vol. 1 =

Studio album by Kieran Hebden and Steve Reid
- Released: 27 February 2006
- Recorded: 4 April 2005 at the Exchange, London
- Genre: Jazz, electronic
- Length: 36:42
- Label: Domino Records
- Producer: Kieran Hebden

Kieran Hebden and Steve Reid chronology
Everything Ecstatic (2005)	The Exchange Session Vol. 1 (2006)	The Exchange Session Vol. 2 (2006)

Professional ratings
Aggregate scores
Source	Rating
Metacritic	68/100
Review scores
Source	Rating
Allmusic	3.5/5 stars
The Independent	3/5 stars
The Observer	4/5 stars
Pitchfork Media	(6.8/10)
The Times	4/5 stars
Tiny Mix Tapes	4/5 stars

The Exchange Session Vol. 1 is a 2006 album by Kieran Hebden and Steve Reid, recorded in one day at The Exchange Mastering Studios in London. The album contains no overdubbing or editing.

== Track listing ==
1. "Morning Prayer" – 6:38
2. "Soul Oscillations" – 14:19
3. "Electricity and Drum Will Change Your Mind" – 15:45

== Personnel ==
- Steve Reid – drums and percussion
- Kieran Hebden – electronics
