= Mudfoot =

Studio album by the Leaders
- Released: 1986
- Recorded: June 11 & 12, 1986
- Genre: Jazz
- Label: Black Hawk

The Leaders chronology
Mudfoot (1986)	Out Here Like This (1987)

Mudfoot is the debut album by the all-star jazz group the Leaders, released on the Black Hawk label in 1986. The album features performances by Lester Bowie, Chico Freeman, Arthur Blythe, Cecil McBee, Kirk Lightsey and Don Moye.

== Reception ==
Professional ratings
Review scores
Source	Rating
AllMusic	4/5 stars
Robert Christgau	A−
Tom Hull – on the Web	A−

The AllMusic review by Scott Yanow states that "it is an excellent effort. Two songs are group compositions (including the ad-lib 'Midnite Train'); Freeman provided a tribute to Eric Dolphy ('Freedom Swing Song'); and the other selections include originals by Blythe and McBee, plus Sam Cooke's 'Cupid' (which has a Freeman vocal). Worth searching for".

Robert Christgau wrote: "Opening with a glorious and playful 13-minute blues and closing with a sweet and crooked 'Cupid'... this all-star blowing unit gets arty in between and also gets away with it... Familiar gambits all by now, but this kind of execution is what everybody who begins with them is hoping to end up with."

Mike Joyce of The Washington Post commented: "All-star sessions are a commonplace in jazz... every so often an album such as Mudfoot... comes along and makes the idea seem vital and exciting again... It's an impressive lineup, but the group's debut album succeeds primarily because the band is just that – a real band, not just a group of all-stars gathered for a hastily produced recording session."

Pianist and composer Ethan Iverson praised Blythe's "Miss Nancy," writing: "damn, does Blythe take a great solo on this song... It's all there: the honk, the surreal, post-Coltrane pentatonics, even nailing the hard parallel changes when needed. Yeah!"

== Track listing ==
1. "Miss Nancy" (Arthur Blythe) – 13:14
2. "Elaborations" (Blythe) – 4:21
3. "Midnite Train" (Blythe, Lester Bowie, Chico Freeman, Kirk Lightsey, Cecil McBee, Don Moye) – 3:40
4. "Freedom Swing Song" (Freeman) – 4:41
5. "Song of Her" (McBee) – 5:37
6. "Mudfoot" (Blythe, Don Cherry, Freeman, Lightsey, McBee, Moye) – 6:49
7. "Cupid" (Sam Cooke) – 3:06

== Personnel ==
- Lester Bowie: trumpet
- Chico Freeman: tenor saxophone, soprano saxophone, bass clarinet, vocals
- Arthur Blythe: alto saxophone
- Cecil McBee: bass
- Kirk Lightsey: piano
- Don Moye: drums
