= Kirk Lightsey =

American jazz musician (born 1937)

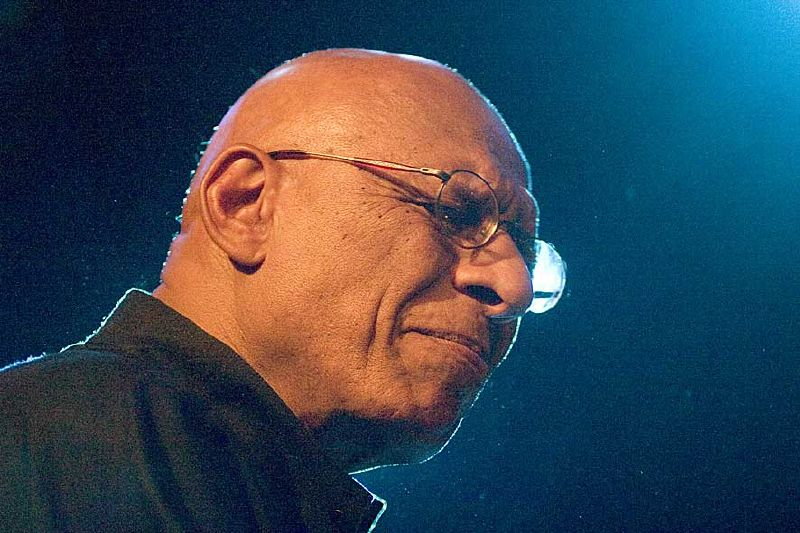
Photo by Tom Beetz

Kirkland "Kirk" Lightsey (born 15 February 1937), is an American jazz pianist.

== Biography ==
He was born in Detroit, Michigan, United States. Lightsey had piano instruction from the age of five and studied piano and clarinet through high school. After serving in the army, Lightsey worked in Detroit and California in the 1960s as an accompanist to singers. He also worked with jazz musicians such as Yusef Lateef, Betty Carter, Pharoah Sanders, Bobby Hutcherson, Sonny Stitt, Chet Baker, and Kenny Burrell. From 1979 to 1983 he toured with Dexter Gordon and was a member of The Leaders in the late 1980s. During the 1980s he led several sessions of his own, including duets with pianist Harold Danko.

He is also an accomplished flutist and occasionally doubles on flute in live performances. He has been living in Paris since 2000.

== Discography ==
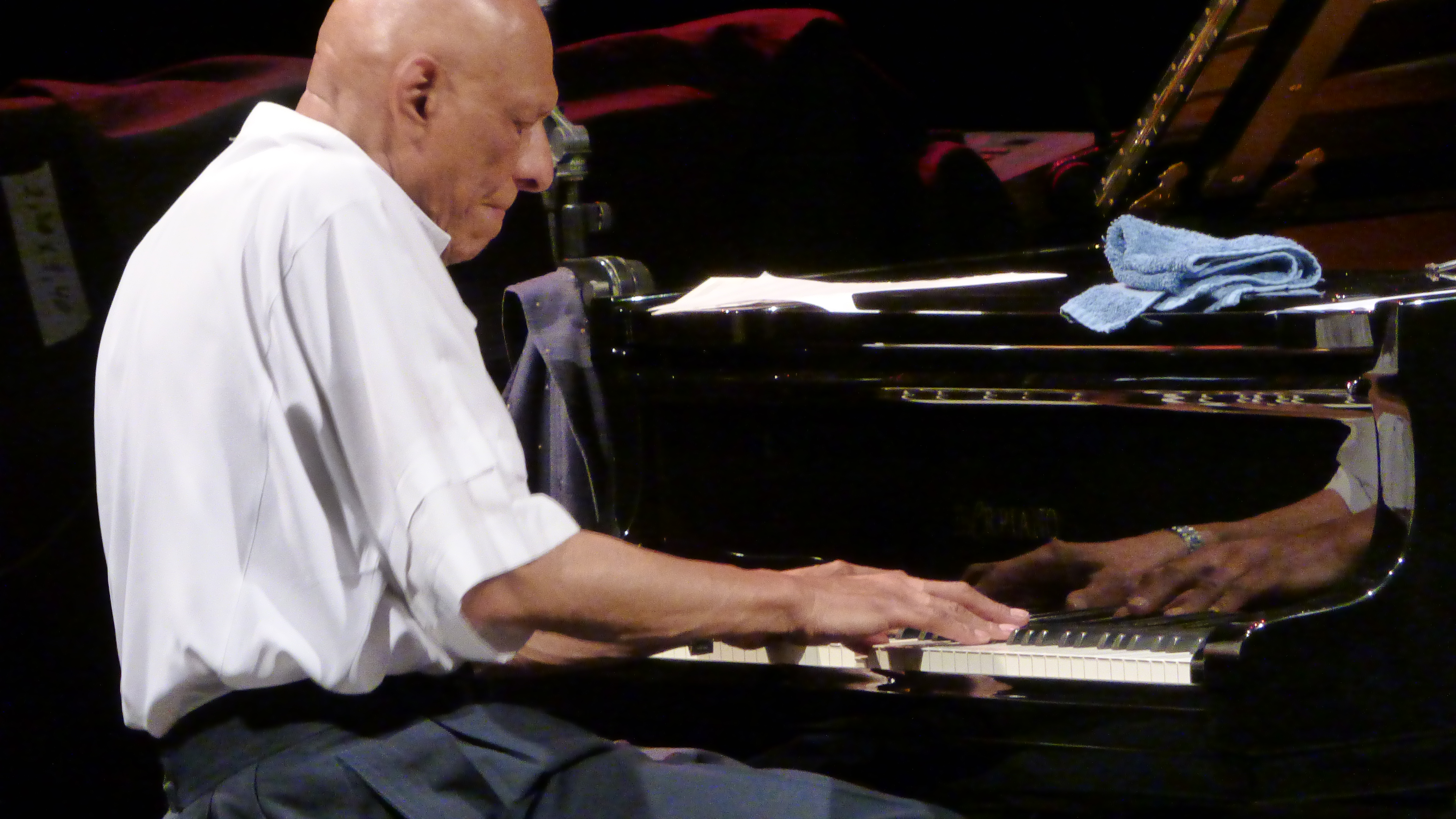
Kirk Lightsey concert at San Javier International Jazz Festival, 2016

=== As leader ===
- Habiba (Gallo, 1974) with Rudolph Johnson
- Lightsey 1 (Sunnyside, 1983)
- Isotope (Criss Cross, 1983)
- Everything Happens to Me (Timeless, 1983) with Chet Baker
- Shorter by Two (Sunnyside, 1983) with Harold Danko
- Lightsey 2 (Sunnyside, 1984)
- Lightsey Live (Sunnyside, 1985)
- First Affairs (Limetree, 1986)
- Everything Is Changed (Sunnyside, 1986)
- Kirk 'n Marcus (Criss Cross, 1986) with Marcus Belgrave
- From Kirk to Nat (Criss Cross, 1990)
- Goodbye Mr. Evans (Evidence, 1994)
- The Nights of Bradley's (Sunnyside, 1984 [2004])
- Estate (Itinera, 2006)
- Everybody’s Song But Our Own (33 Records, 2008) with Louise Gibbs
- Lightsey To Gladden (Criss Cross Jazz, 2008)
- If You're Not Having Fun By Now... (2013)
- Le Corbu (Unit Records, 2015) with Tibor Elekes, Don Moye
- Some Place Called Where (Losen Records, 2017) with Marilena Paradisi
- Coltrane Revisited (SteepleChase LookOut, 2021)
- Live at Smalls Jazz Club (Cellar Music Group, 2022)

=== As sideman ===
With Chet Baker

- Smokin' with the Chet Baker Quintet (Prestige, 1965)
- Groovin' with the Chet Baker Quintet (Prestige, 1965)
- Comin' On with the Chet Baker Quintet (Prestige, 1965)
- Cool Burnin' with the Chet Baker Quintet (Prestige, 1965)
- Boppin' with the Chet Baker Quintet (Prestige, 1965)

With Kenny Burrell

- Sky Street (Fantasy, 1975)

With Agostino Di Giorgio

- The Path (Fonò, 2001)

With Ricky Ford

- Shorter Ideas (Muse, 1984)
- Looking Ahead (Muse, 1986)
- Saxotic Stomp (Muse, 1987)

With Sonny Fortune

- Four in One (Blue Note, 1994)

With Dexter Gordon

- American Classic (Elektra Musician, 1982)
- More Than You Know 1981 (GleAM Records, 2025)

With Javon Jackson and Billy Pierce

- Burnin' (Criss Cross, 1991)

With Clifford Jordan

- Two Tenor Winner (Criss Cross, 1984)

With Louis Hayes

- The Super Quartet (Timeless, 1994)

With Brian Lynch

- Peer Pressure (Criss Cross, 1986)

With Blue Mitchell and Harold Land

- Mapenzi (Concord, 1977)

With David "Fathead" Newman

- Heads Up (Atlantic, 1987)
- Fire! Live at the Village Vanguard (Atlantic, 1989)

With David Murray

- Black & Black (Red Baron, 1991)

With The Leaders

- Mudfoot (Black Hawk, 1986)
- Out Here Like This (Black Saint, 1987)
- Unforeseen Blessings (Black Saint, 1988)
- Heaven Dance (Sunnyside, 1988)
- Slipping and Sliding (Sound Hills, 1994)

With Jimmy Raney

- The Master (Criss Cross, 1983)

With Rufus Reid

- Perpetual Stroll (Theresa, 1980)

With Roots

- Saying Something (1995)
- For Bird & Diz (In+Out, 1996)

With Saheb Sarbib

- It Couldn't Happen Without You (Soul Note)

With Woody Shaw

- Imagination (Muse, 1987)

With Sonny Stitt

- Pow! (Prestige, 1965)

With Rudolph Johnson

- The Second Coming (Black Jazz Records, 1973)

== Sources ==
- Kirk Lightsey at AllMusic
