= The Exchange Session Vol. 2 =

Studio album by Kieran Hebden and Steve Reid
- Released: 22 May 2006
- Recorded: 4 April 2005 at the Exchange, London
- Genres: Jazz, electronic
- Length: 53:55
- Label: Domino Records
- Producer: Kieran Hebden

Kieran Hebden and Steve Reid chronology
The Exchange Session Vol. 1 (2006)	The Exchange Session Vol. 2 (2006)	Tongues (2007)

Professional ratings
Aggregate scores
Source	Rating
Metacritic	64/100
Review scores
Source	Rating
Allmusic	3.5/5 stars

The Exchange Session Vol. 2 is a 2006 album by Kieran Hebden and Steve Reid. It documents a jam session.

== Track listing ==
1. "Hold Down the Rhythms, Hold Down the Machines" – 20:00
2. "Noémie" – 17:28
3. "We Dream Free" – 16:02

== Personnel ==
- Steve Reid – drums and percussion
- Kieran Hebden – electronics
