= Unforeseen Blessings =

Studio album by the Leaders
- Released: 1989
- Recorded: December 19–20, 1988
- Genre: Jazz
- Length: 45:10
- Label: Black Saint

The Leaders chronology
Heaven Dance (1988)	Unforeseen Blessings (1989)	Slipping and Sliding (1994)

Unforeseen Blessings is a jazz album released in 1989. It was the third album by the all-star jazz group the Leaders and the second to be released on the Italian Black Saint label. The album features performances by Lester Bowie, Chico Freeman, Arthur Blythe, Cecil McBee, Kirk Lightsey and Don Moye.

== Reception ==
Professional ratings
Review scores
Source	Rating
AllMusic	2/5 stars
Los Angeles Times	2/5 stars
The Penguin Guide to Jazz Recordings	2.5/4 stars

The AllMusic review by Scott Yanow stated, "Other than Lightsey's contributions, this effort is surprisingly forgettable."

The authors of The Penguin Guide to Jazz Recordings called the album "curious," and noted: "The pianist plays unaccompanied on the opening track and two others, and is the most prominent soloist. Bowie only has one extensive feature... and there is precious little from Blythe and Freeman."

Don Snowden of the Los Angeles Times commented: "'Unforeseen Session' is more like it. Only five of the 13 selections sport the Leaders' full sextet line-up -- the remainder are solo piano pieces by Kirk Lightsey, brief percussion interludes and what sound like blueprints for future compositions... Mystifying."

== Track listing ==
1. "In a Minute" (Lightsey) - 2:51
2. "Hip Dripper" (Blythe) - 3:35
3. "Sun Precondition Five" (Moye) - 0:38
4. "The Search" (Freeman) - 2:48
5. "Lightish" (Lightsey) - 1:22
6. "Sun Precondition Six" (Moye) - 0:18
7. "Peacemaker" (McBee) - 6:34
8. "Wait a Minute" (Bowie, Freeman, McBee) - 2:35
9. "Agadir" (Blythe) - 1:36
10. "Heaven Dance" (Lightsey) - 9:47
11. "Now a Moment" (Lightsey) - :49
12. "Lucia" (McBee) - 7:35
13. "Blueberry Hill" (Lewis, Rose, Stock) - 4:42

== Personnel ==
- Lester Bowie – trumpet
- Chico Freeman – saxophone
- Arthur Blythe – saxophone
- Cecil McBee – bass
- Kirk Lightsey – piano
- Don Moye – drums
