= Bush Baby (album) =

Studio album by Arthur Blythe
- Released: 1978
- Recorded: December 1977
- Genre: Jazz
- Label: Adelphi
- Producer: Arthur Blythe, Dan Doyle

Arthur Blythe chronology
Metamorphosis (1977)	Bush Baby (1978)	In the Tradition (1978)

Bush Baby is an album by jazz saxophonist Arthur Blythe. It was recorded in December 1977 and released in 1978 on the Adelphi label.

== Reception ==
Professional ratings
Review scores
Source	Rating
AllMusic	3/5 stars
The Rolling Stone Jazz Record Guide	5/5 stars

The Bay State Banner wrote that "the unusual instrumentation of alto sax-congatuba makes some striking voicings and harmonies, and Blythe displays some torrid phrasing and lines."

The AllMusic review by Scott Yanow stated: "Blythe had an original sound from the start and his soulful yet adventurous and intense style is heard in its early prime."

== Track listing ==
All compositions by Arthur Blythe

1. "Mamie Lee" – 10:32
2. "For Fats" – 8:43
3. "Off the Top" – 8:20
4. "Bush Baby" – 9:07
- Recorded at Blank Tapes Recording Studio in New York City in December 1977.

== Personnel ==
- Arthur Blythe – alto saxophone
- Ahkmed Abdullah – congas
- Bob Stewart – tuba
- Dan Doyle and Arthur Blythe – producers
- Bob Blank – recording engineer
- Dan Doyle and Gene Rosenthal – mix engineers
- Ron Warwell – cover illustration and design
- Candace – rear cover layout and design
- Gene Rosenthal – photography
- W. A. Brower – liner notes
