= From Kirk to Nat =

Studio album by Kirk Lightsey Trio
- Released: 1991
- Recorded: November 28, 1990
- Studio: Manhattan Recordings Studios, New York, NY
- Genre: Jazz
- Length: 54:51
- Label: Criss Cross Jazz; 1050
- Producer: Gerry Teekens

Kirk Lightsey chronology
Temptation (1987)	From Kirk to Nat (1991)	1991 (1991)

From Kirk to Nat is an album by pianist Kirk Lightsey that was recorded in 1990 and released by the Dutch Criss Cross Jazz label.

== Reception ==
Professional ratings
Review scores
Source	Rating
AllMusic	4/5 stars
The Penguin Guide to Jazz Recordings	3/4 stars

The AllMusic review states "One of the main reasons why this tribute to the Nat King Cole Trio by Kirk Lightsey is a success is that Lightsey (who is from a much later bop-influenced generation) sounds nothing like Cole ... Lightsey performs a set of music reminiscent of Cole but several of the songs were never actually recorded by Cole; Lightsey takes surprisingly effective vocals on the latter two songs".

== Track listing ==
1. "You and the Night and the Music" (Arthur Schwartz, Howard Dietz) – 6:12
2. "Sweet Lorraine" (Cliff Burwell, Mitchell Parish) – 7:42
3. "Never Let Me Go" (Jay Livingston, Ray Evans) – 4:45
4. "Bop Kick" (Nat King Cole) – 5:36
5. "Sophisticated Lady" (Duke Ellington, Irving Mills) – 8:05
6. "The Best Is Yet to Come" (C. Oliver) – 6:24
7. "Close Enough for Love" (Johnny Mandel, Paul Williams) – 4:32
8. "Little Old Lady" (Hoagy Carmichael, Stanley Adams) – 5:56
9. "Kirk's Blues" (Kirk Lightsey) – 5:35

== Personnel ==
- Kirk Lightsey – piano, vocals
- Kevin Eubanks – guitar
- Rufus Reid – bass
