= Alternate Spaces =

Studio album by Cecil McBee
- Released: 1977
- Recorded: 1977, New York
- Genre: Jazz
- Length: 35:23
- Label: 1977: Bomba Records BOM 573; 1979: India Navigation IN 1043
- Producer: Bob Cummins

Cecil McBee chronology
Mutima (1974)	Alternate Spaces (1977)	Music from the Source (1978)

Alternate Spaces is an album led by bassist Cecil McBee recorded in 1977 and first released on the Japanese Bomba label, after which it was reissued on India Navigation.

== Reception ==
Professional ratings
Review scores
Source	Rating
AllMusic	4/5 stars
The Rolling Stone Jazz Record Guide	4/5 stars
DownBeat	4.5/5 stars

In his review for AllMusic, Scott Yanow stated "The often melodic but unpredictable music definitely holds one's interest". JazzTimes writer Bill Shoemaker observed "McBee's program of boldly lined cookers, poignant ballads, and daring structural statements, elicit consistently strong work from Freeman, Pullen, Moye, trumpeter Joe Gardner, and drummer Allen Nelson. As a soloist, McBee nails everything from fleet blues choruses to wistful lyricism".

== Track listing ==
All compositions by Cecil McBee

1. "Alternate Spaces" - 9:05
2. "Consequence" - 8:15
3. "Come Sunrise" - 6:43
4. "Sorta, Kinda Blue" - 4:07
5. "Expression" - 7:13

== Personnel ==
- Cecil McBee - bass
- Joe Gardner - trumpet
- Chico Freeman - tenor saxophone, soprano saxophone, flute
- Don Pullen - piano
- Allen Nelson - drums
- Famoudou Don Moye - percussion
