= Slipping and Sliding =

Studio album by The Leaders
- Released: 1994
- Recorded: June 15, 16, and 17, 1993, and January 7 and 8, 1994
- Studio: System Two, Brooklyn, New York
- Genre: Jazz
- Length: 58:16
- Label: Sound Hills; SSCD-8054
- Producer: The Leaders

The Leaders chronology
Unforeseen Blessings (1989)	Slipping and Sliding (1994)	Spirits Alike (2006)

Slipping and Sliding is an album by the all-star jazz group The Leaders. It was recorded in June 1993 and January 1994 in Brooklyn, New York, and was released in 1994 by the Japanese label Sound Hills Records. The album features performances by tenor saxophonist Chico Freeman, alto saxophonist Arthur Blythe, trumpeter Lester Bowie, pianist Kirk Lightsey, bassist Cecil McBee, and drummer Don Moye.

== Reception ==
Professional ratings
Review scores
Source	Rating
The Penguin Guide to Jazz	3/4 stars

The authors of The Penguin Guide to Jazz Recordings stated: "Slipping and Sliding reinforces the Art Ensemble analogy more than we might have expected, with an emphasis on showmanship and pure theatre that might dismay some listeners. However, the sheer range of musicianship is what sustains this band and there is enough quality playing from just about every position to satisfy even the most finicky."

A reviewer for Jazz Times wrote: "the album establishes something akin to the mid-'60s eclecticism of many classic Blue Notes, allowing... wide-open improvisation."

== Track listing ==
1. "Slipping and Sliding" (Lightsey) – 11:17
2. "Everything Changed" (Lightsey) – 6:20
3. "Fukawe T." (Blythe, McBee, Freeman, Moye, Lightsey, Bowie) – 3:42
4. "High Summer" (Lightsey) – 7:48
5. "Louisa" (McBee) – 5:01
6. "Blues on the Bottom" (McBee) – 10:42
7. "Mist" (Freeman) – 6:43
8. "Drums Til Don" (Lightsey) – 6:46
- Recorded on June 15, 16, and 17, 1993, and January 7 and 8, 1994, at System Two Studios, Brooklyn, New York.

== Personnel ==
- Chico Freeman – tenor saxophone, soprano saxophone
- Arthur Blythe – alto saxophone
- Lester Bowie – trumpet
- Kirk Lightsey – piano, flute
- Cecil McBee – double bass, piano
- Don Moye – drums, congas, bongos, gong, chimes, bells
