= Music from the Source =

Live album by Cecil McBee Sextet
- Released: 1978
- Recorded: August 2, 1977 at Sweet Basil, NYC
- Genre: Jazz
- Length: 44:48
- Label: Enja 3019
- Producer: Cecil McBee

Cecil McBee chronology
Alternate Spaces (1977)	Music from the Source (1978)	Compassion (1979)

Music from the Source is a live album by bassist Cecil McBee's Sextet recorded at Sweet Basil in 1977 and released on the Enja label.

== Reception ==
Professional ratings
Review scores
Source	Rating
AllMusic	4.5/5 stars
The Rolling Stone Jazz Record Guide	3/5 stars

In his review for AllMusic, Scott Yanow stated "The music is spiritual in nature, sometimes quite modal and in the adventurous genre of John Coltrane without being derivative. A fine live set."

== Track listing ==
All compositions by Cecil McBee

1. "Agnez (With Respect to Roy Haynes)" - 19:04
2. "God Spirit" - 7:59
3. "First Song in the Day" - 17:04

== Personnel ==
- Cecil McBee - bass
- Joe Gardner - trumpet, flugelhorn
- Chico Freeman - tenor saxophone, flute
- Dennis Moorman - piano
- Steve McCall - drums
- Famoudou Don Moye - congas
