= Compassion (Cecil McBee album) =

Live album by Cecil McBee Sextet
- Released: 1979
- Recorded: August 3, 1977 at Sweet Basil, NYC
- Genre: Jazz
- Length: 41:35
- Label: Enja 3041
- Producer: Cecil McBee

Cecil McBee chronology
Music from the Source (1978)	Compassion (1979)	Flying Out (1982)

Compassion is a live album by bassist Cecil McBee's Sextet recorded at Sweet Basil in 1977 and released on the Enja label.

== Reception ==
Professional ratings
Review scores
Source	Rating
AllMusic	4.5/5 stars
The Rolling Stone Jazz Record Guide	3/5 stars

In his review for AllMusic, Scott Yanow called it an "excellent post-bop set" and stated "The excellent solos, particularly those of Freeman, are adventurous, yet still based in the hard bop/modal tradition".

== Track listing ==
All compositions by Cecil McBee except as indicated

1. "Pepi´s Samba" (Chico Freeman) - 13:15
2. "Undercurrent" - 10:55
3. "Compassion" - 17:25

== Personnel ==
- Cecil McBee - bass
- Joe Gardner - trumpet, flugelhorn
- Chico Freeman - tenor saxophone, soprano saxophone
- Dennis Moorman - piano
- Steve McCall - drums
- Famoudou Don Moye - congas
