= Night Song (Arthur Blythe album) =

Studio album by Arthur Blythe
- Released: 1997
- Recorded: August 13–15, 1996
- Studio: First Unitarian Church, Berkeley, CA
- Genre: Jazz
- Length: 59:40
- Label: Clarity; CCD-1016
- Producer: Chico Freeman

Arthur Blythe chronology
| Hipmotism (1991) | Night Song (1997) | Today's Blues (1997) |

Night Song is an album by the saxophonist Arthur Blythe, released via Clarity Recordings in 1997.

== Reception ==
Professional ratings
Review scores
| Source | Rating |
|---|---|
| AllMusic | 4.5/5 stars |
| The Penguin Guide to Jazz | 4/4 stars |

In his review for AllMusic, Scott Yanow stated: "This is a particularly intriguing and enjoyable release ... Whether it be hints at New Orleans parade rhythms, Afro-Cuban jazz, older styles of jazz, or freer explorations, this is a fascinating set that is well worth several listens". In JazzTimes, Miles Jordan wrote: "This challenging CD finds Blythe doing most of the soloing with Stewart’s ebullient tuba primarily functioning as a walking bass. ... On the tunes that feature the percussionists-all playing hand drums-his marimbas definitely imbue them with a 'world music' feeling".

== Track listing ==
All compositions by Arthur Blythe except where noted

1. "Night Song (Cancion de La Noche)" (Arthur Blythe, Gust Tsilias) – 5:44
2. "Sorrows of Sonny Liston" (Tsilias) – 3:58
3. "Down San Diego Way" – 3:43
4. "It's Hungry/Fulfillment" (Blythe, Chico Freeman, Bob Stewart, Arto Tuncboyaciyan) – 7:43
5. "Ransom" (Blythe, Tuncboyaciyan) – 4:04
6. "Cause of It All" (Blythe, Stewart) – 5:02
7. "We See" (Thelonious Monk) – 5:05
8. "Blood Count" (Billy Strayhorn) – 6:18
9. "Slanderous" – 3:57
10. "Contemplation" – 5:43
11. "Hardly" – 5:24
12. "Night Song (Cancion de La Noche) (Reprise)" (Blythe, Tsilias) – 2:59

== Personnel ==
- Arthur Blythe – alto saxophone
- Chico Freeman – bass clarinet, percussion
- Bob Stewart – tuba
- Gust Tsillis – marimba, vibraphone
- Arto Tunçboyacıyan, David Frazier, Josh Jones – percussion
