= Out Here Like This =

Studio album by the Leaders
- Released: 1987
- Recorded: February 18–19, 1987
- Genre: Jazz
- Length: 46:35
- Label: Black Saint

The Leaders chronology
Mudfoot (1986)	Out Here Like This (1987)	Heaven Dance (1989)

Out Here Like This is a jazz album released in 1987. It was the second album by the all-star jazz group the Leaders and the first to be released on the Italian Black Saint label. The album features performances by Lester Bowie, Chico Freeman, Arthur Blythe, Cecil McBee, Kirk Lightsey and Don Moye.

== Reception ==
Professional ratings
Review scores
Source	Rating
AllMusic	4/5 stars
The Penguin Guide to Jazz Recordings	3.5/4 stars

The AllMusic review by Scott Yanow stated: "The all-star band accurately called the Leaders developed its own group sound. Performing inside/outside music, the band's Black Saint release features originals by Freeman, Lightsey, McBee, and Bowie, plus an obscurity. The trumpeter's straight-ahead 'Zero' is a high point, and all of the musicians play up to their potential. It is particularly interesting to hear Bowie and Blythe excel in this fairly conservative (for them) setting".

The authors of The Penguin Guide to Jazz Recordings wrote: "There's a good balance of sound between the front-row voices and a more prominent role for McBee. Bowie's theatrical presentation... is also a vivid jazz history lesson."

== Track listing ==
1. "Zero" (Bowie) - 7:53
2. "Luna" (Freeman) - 6:33
3. "Cool T." (Bowie) - 5:13
4. "Donkey Dust" (Lightsey) - 7:06
5. "Portraits" (McBee) - 7:58
6. "Felicite" (McBee) - 5:59
7. "Loves I Once Knew" (David Durrah) - 5:53

== Personnel ==
- Lester Bowie – trumpet
- Chico Freeman – tenor saxophone, soprano saxophone, bass clarinet
- Arthur Blythe – alto saxophone
- Cecil McBee – bass
- Kirk Lightsey – piano
- Don Moye – drums
