= The Leaders =

Jazz supergroup formed in 1983

The Leaders is a jazz supergroup formed in 1983.

The initial lineup of the Leaders was put together in 1983 by saxophonist Chico Freeman and featured trumpeter Don Cherry, alto saxophonist Arthur Blythe, along with a rhythm section of pianist Don Pullen, bassist Cecil McBee, and drummer Famoudou Don Moye. In the second incarnation of the Leaders in 1984, pianist Don Pullen was replaced with Hilton Ruiz. In 1985, the third and final incarnation of the Leaders, pianist Hilton Ruiz was replaced by Kirk Lightsey and trumpeter Don Cherry was replaced by Lester Bowie. The Leaders released four albums in the late 1980s and early 1990s. The rhythm section also recorded one album on their own as The Leaders Trio (Heaven Dance, 1988).

In 2007 a new and reconstituted Leaders, again formed by Chico Freeman consisted of Freeman and McBee alongside Eddie Henderson on trumpet, Bobby Watson on alto, Fred Harris on piano, and Billy Hart on drums, released the album Spirits Alike.

== Discography ==
- 1986: Mudfoot (Black-Hawk)
- 1987: Out Here Like This (Black Saint)
- 1988: Heaven Dance (Sunnyside), piano trio album
- 1988: Unforeseen Blessings (Black Saint)
- 1994: Slipping and Sliding (Sound Hills Records) Japanese release
- 2006: Spirits Alike (Double Moon)
