= Bob Stewart (musician) =

American jazz tuba player and music teacher (born 1945)

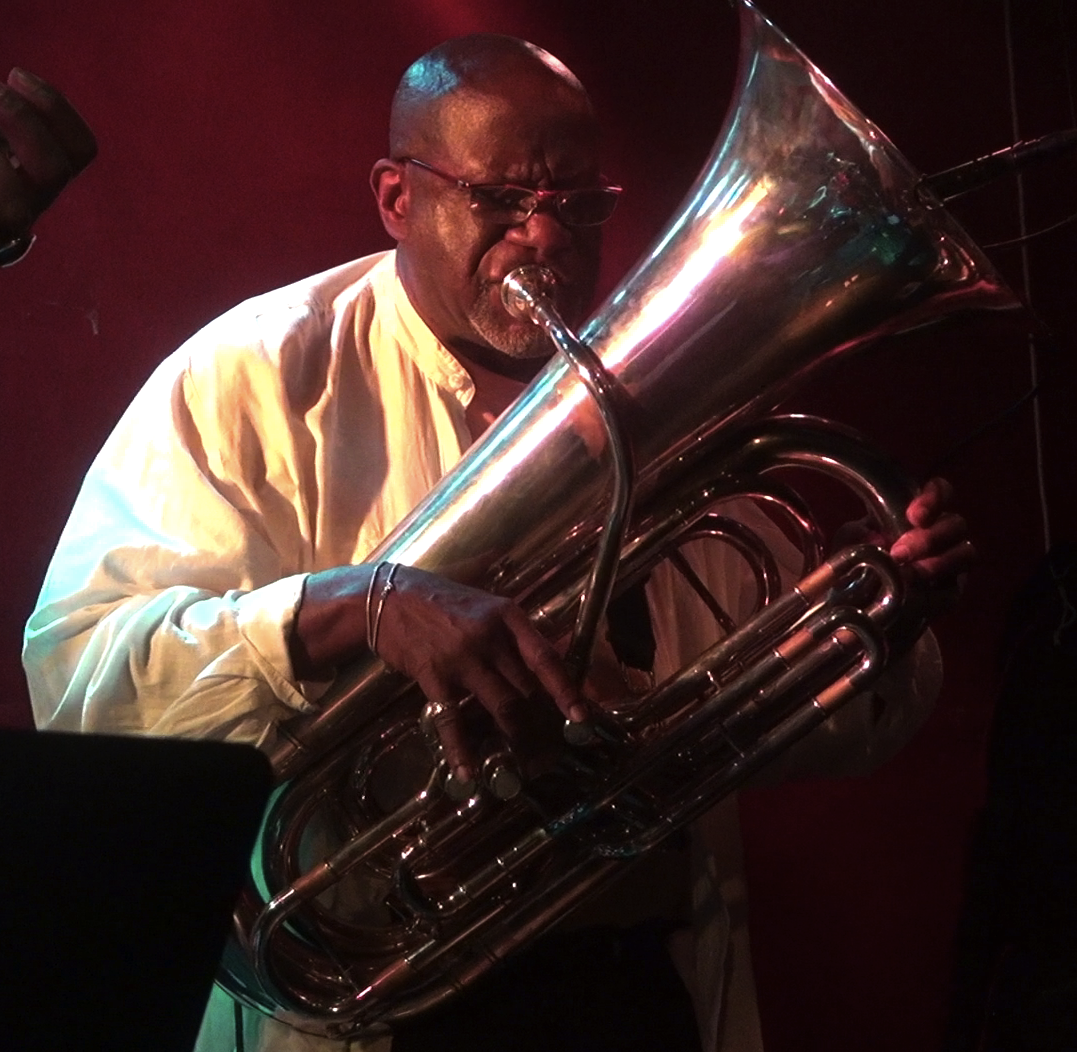
- Stewart playing in New York City

Background information
- Born: February 3, 1945 (age 81); Sioux Falls, South Dakota, U.S.
- Genres: Jazz
- Occupation: Musician
- Instrument: Tuba
- Label: Postcards
- Website: www.bobstewartuba.com

Bob Stewart (born February 3, 1945) is an American jazz tuba player and music teacher.

== Early life and education ==
Stewart was born in Sioux Falls, South Dakota. He earned a Bachelor of Arts degree in music education from the Philadelphia College of the Performing Arts and a Master of Education from Lehman College.

== Career ==
Stewart taught music in Pennsylvania public schools and at Fiorello H. LaGuardia High School in New York City. He is now a professor at the Juilliard School and is a distinguished lecturer at Lehman College.

Stewart has toured and recorded with such artists as Charles Mingus, Gil Evans, Carla Bley, Muhal Richard Abrams, David Murray, Taj Mahal, Dizzy Gillespie, McCoy Tyner, Freddie Hubbard, Don Cherry, Nicholas Payton, Wynton Marsalis, Charlie Haden, Lester Bowie, Bill Frisell, Globe Unity Orchestra and many others in the United States, Europe, and Eastern Asia.

He was a frequent collaborator with saxophonist Arthur Blythe from the 1970s into the early 2000s, often taking the place of the string bass that traditionally supports a jazz ensemble. In their review of Blythe's album Lenox Avenue Breakdown, the editors of The Penguin Guide to Jazz called Stewart's title track solo "one of the few genuinely important tuba statements in jazz."

== Discography ==
=== As leader ===
- 1987: First Line (JMT)
- 1988: Goin' Home (JMT)
- 2000: Then & Now (Postcards) with Taj Majal, Carlos Ward, Steve Turre, and Graham Haynes
- 2008: Heavy Metal Duo: Work Songs and Other Spirituals

=== As sideman ===
With Ahmed Abdullah's Diaspora and Francisco Mora Catlett's AfroHORN

- Jazz: A Music of the Spirit (Amedian, 2019)

With Ray Anderson

- It Just So Happens (Enja, 1987)

With Arthur Blythe

- Metamorphosis (1977)
- The Grip (1977)
- Bush Baby (1978)
- Lenox Avenue Breakdown (Columbia, 1979)
- Illusions (1980)
- Blythe Spirit (1981)
- Elaborations (1982)
- Light Blue: Arthur Blythe Plays Thelonious Monk (1983)
- Hipmotism (Enja, 1991)
- Night Song (Clarity, 1997)
- Spirits in the Field (Savant, 2000)
- Focus (Savant, 2002)
- Exhale (Savant, 2003)

With Henry Butler

- The Village (1987, Impulse!)

With Uri Caine

- The Sidewalks of New York: Tin Pan Alley (Winter & Winter, 1999)
- The Goldberg Variations (Winter & Winter, 2000)

With Don Cherry

- Multikuti (A&M, 1990)

With Gil Evans

- There Comes a Time (RCA, 1975)
- Priestess (Antilles, 1977 [1983])
- Gil Evans Live at the Royal Festival Hall London 1978 (RCA, 1979)

With Bill Frisell

- Rambler

With Dizzy Gillespie and Machito

- Afro-Cuban Jazz Moods (Pablo, 1975)

With Howard Johnson and Gravity

- Gravity!!! (Verve, 1996)
- Right Now! (Verve, 1997)
- Testimony (Tuscarora, 2017)

With Chris Joris

- Songs For Mbizo (VKH Tonesetters, 1991 and Jazz Halo/Omnitone, 2002) – with 1976 recordings

With David Murray

- Live at Sweet Basil Volume 1 (Black Saint, 1984)
- Live at Sweet Basil Volume 2 (Black Saint, 1984)
- David Murray Big Band (DIW/Columbia, 1991)

With Charles Mingus

- Let My Children Hear Music (Columbia, 1972)
- Charles Mingus and Friends in Concert (Columbia, 1972)

With Sam Rivers

- Crystals (Impulse!, 1974)
- Inspiration (BMG France, 1999)
- Culmination (BMG France, 1999)

With Herb Robertson

- Shades of Bud Powell (JMT, 1988)
