= Bobby Battle =

American jazz drummer (1944–2019)

Bobby Battle (January 8, 1944 – December 6, 2019 in Detroit) was an American jazz drummer. Occasionally, he played the saxophone.

== History ==
Battle moved to New York City in 1968, playing with Roland Kirk and Pharoah Sanders shortly after his arrival. He studied at New York University from 1972 to 1975. He played with Don Pullen and Sam Rivers through the late 1970s, and worked often with Arthur Blythe in the 1980s and 1990s. He also worked with Kenny Dorham, Sonny Stitt, and Sonny Fortune. He worked as a duo with Jimmy Ponder in 1987.

Battle's only release as a leader is The Offering, issued in 1990 on Mapleshade, in which Battle leads a quartet with David Murray, Larry Willis, and Santi Debriano.

== Discography ==
=== As leader ===
- The Offering (Mapleshade, 1990)

=== As sideman ===
With Arthur Blythe

- Illusions (Columbia, 1980)
- Blythe Spirit (Columbia, 1981)
- Elaborations (Columbia, 1982)
- Light Blue: Arthur Blythe Plays Thelonious Monk (Columbia, 1983)

With Don Pullen

- Capricorn Rising (Black Saint, 1975)
- Tomorrow's Promises (Atlantic, 1977)
- Warriors (Black Saint, 1979)
- The Sixth Sense (Black Saint, 1985)
