= Kelvyn Bell =

American jazz musician

Kelvyn Bell (born June 19, 1956, St. Louis) is an American guitarist and vocalist who plays in jazz and funk idioms.

Bell studied guitar under Oliver Lake and, through Lake, became a member of the Black Artists Group, meeting musicians such as Hamiett Bluiett, Lester Bowie, and Joseph Bowie. He attended University of Missouri and Southern Illinois University, then relocated to New York City, where he played with Lester Bowie, Charles "Bobo" Shaw, and Arthur Blythe (with whom he would play until the 1990s). He became a member of Defunkt, Joseph Bowie's ensemble, from 1980 to 1988, concomitantly leading his own band, Kelvynator (featuring Eric Person). During the 1980s, he also worked with Steve Coleman, Michele Rosewoman, Jean-Paul Bourelly, and Bob Stewart. He was a member of the group GX4 alongside Elliott Sharp, David Fiuczynski, and Marc Ribot late in the 1980s. His associations in the 1990s included Lester Bowie, Craig Harris, and Cassandra Wilson. He became a jazz educator at Harlem School of the Arts in 1995.
