= Cecil McBee =

American jazz bassist (born 1935)

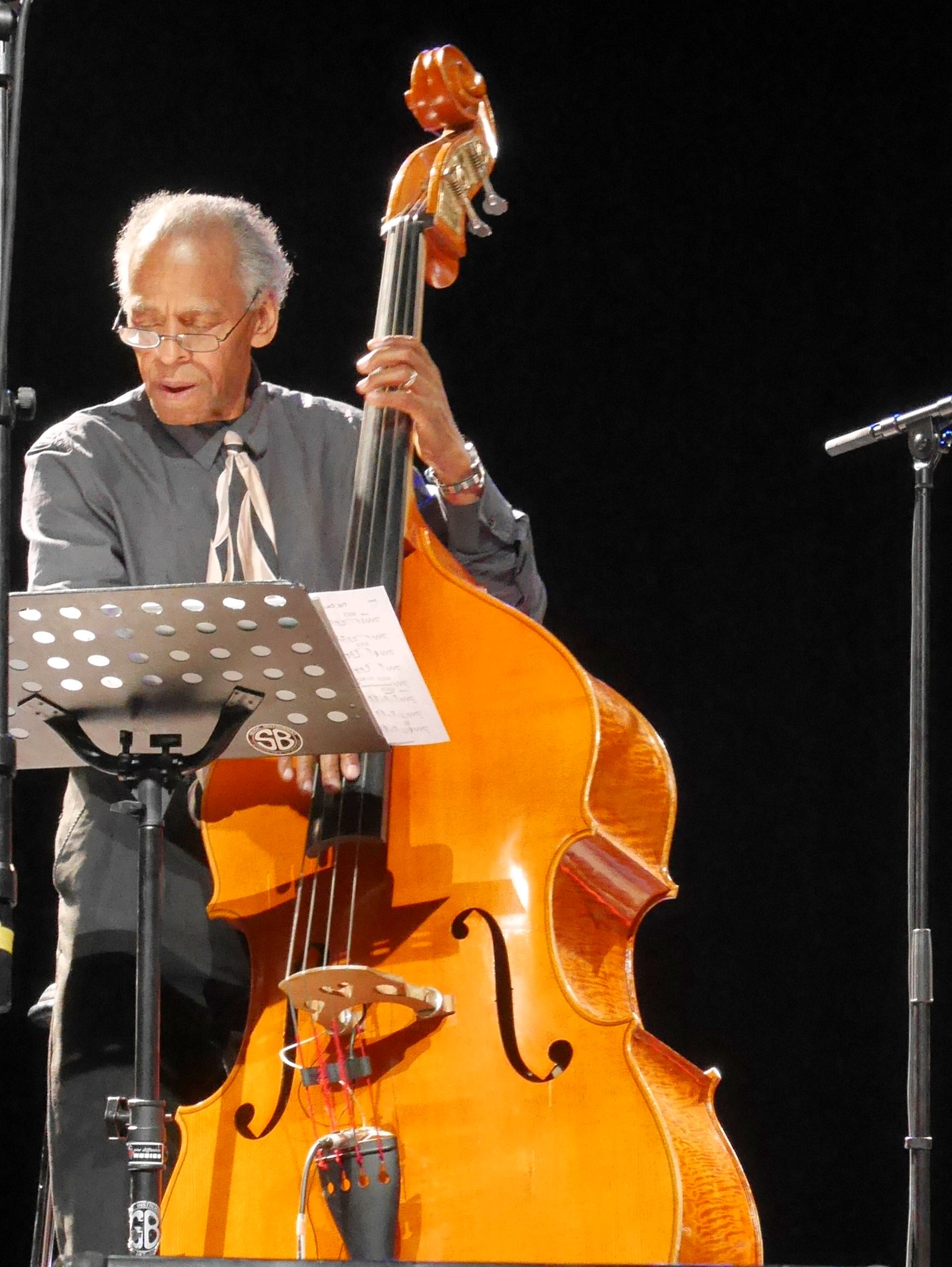
- Cecil McBee, The Cookers at Nice 2016

Background information
- Born: May 19, 1935 (age 91); Tulsa, Oklahoma, U.S.
- Genres: Jazz
- Occupation: Musician
- Instrument: Double bass
- Labels: Strata-East, Enja, India Navigation, Palmetto

Cecil McBee (born May 19, 1935) is an American jazz bassist. He has recorded as a leader only a handful of times since the 1970s, but has contributed as a sideman to a number of classic jazz albums.

== Early life and education ==
McBee was born in Tulsa, Oklahoma, United States. He studied clarinet at school, but switched to bass at the age of 17, and began playing in local nightclubs. After gaining a music degree from Ohio Central State University, McBee spent two years in the U.S. Army, during which time he conducted the band at Fort Knox.

=== Beginnings ===
In 1959, he played with Dinah Washington, and in 1962 he moved to Detroit, Michigan, where he worked with Paul Winter's folk-rock ensemble between 1963 and 1964.

=== New York ===
His jazz career began to take off in the mid-1960s, after he moved to New York, when he began playing and recording with a number of significant musicians including Miles Davis, Andrew Hill, Sam Rivers, Jackie McLean (1964), Wayne Shorter (1965–66), Charles Lloyd (1966), Yusef Lateef (1967–69), Keith Jarrett, Freddie Hubbard and Woody Shaw (1986), and Alice Coltrane (1969–72).

=== Later career ===
In the 2000s, McBee unsuccessfully sued a Japanese company that opened a chain of stores under his name. He was an artist in residence at Harvard from 2010 to 2011. He teaches at the New England Conservatory in Boston, Massachusetts.

== Awards ==
- 1991 he was inducted into the Oklahoma Jazz Hall of Fame.

=== Grammys ===
- Blues for Coltrane: A Tribute to John Coltrane (MCA, 1987), Pharoah Sanders/David Murray/McCoy Tyner/Cecil McBee/Roy Haynes – Winner, Best instrumental performance, individual or group, Grammy Awards, 1988.

== Discography ==
=== As leader/co-leader ===
- Mutima (Strata-East, 1974)
- Alternate Spaces (Bomba, 1977)
- Music from the Source (Enja, 1977 [1978])
- Compassion (Enja, 1977 [1979])
- Flying Out (India Navigation, 1982)
- Roots of Blue (RPR, 1986) – duets with Muhal Richard Abrams
- Unspoken (Palmetto, 1996 [1997])
- Tribal Ghost (NoBusiness, 2007 [2013]) with John Tchicai, Charlie Kohlhase, Garrison Fewell, and Billy Hart

With Almanac (Mike Nock, Bennie Maupin, McBee, Eddie Marshall)

- Almanac (Improvising Artists, 1967 [1977])

=== As sideman ===
With George Adams

- America (Blue Note, 1990)

With Ray Anderson

- Old Bottles - New Wine (Enja, 1985)

With Chet Baker

- Blues for a Reason (Criss Cross Jazz, 1985)

With Bill Barron

- Live at Cobi's 2 (SteepleChase, 1985 [2006])

With Kenny Barron

- Landscape (Baystate, 1984)
- What If? (Enja, 1986)
- Live at Fat Tuesdays (Enja, 1988)

With Joanne Brackeen

- Snooze (Choice, 1975)
- Tring-a-Ling (Choice, 1977)
- Havin' Fun (Concord Jazz, 1985)
- Fi-Fi Goes to Heaven (Concord Jazz, 1986)
- Turnaround (Evidence, 1992)

With Dollar Brand

- African Space Program (Enja, 1973)

With Anthony Braxton

- Eight (+3) Tristano Compositions, 1989: For Warne Marsh (hatArt, 1989)

With Roy Brooks

- The Free Slave (Muse, 1970 [1972])

With Joe Chambers

- The Almoravid (Muse, 1974)

With Alice Coltrane

- Journey in Satchidananda (Impulse!, 1970)
- Carnegie Hall '71 (Hi Hat, 2018)
- The Carnegie Hall Concert (Impulse!, 2024)

With Norman Connors

- Dance of Magic (Sony Music Entertainment, 1972)

With Junior Cook

- Pressure Cooker (Catalyst, 1977)

With Stanley Cowell

- Equipoise (Galaxy, 1979)
- Close to You Alone (DIW, 1990)

With Ted Curson

- Blue Piccolo (Whynot, 1976)

With Ricky Ford

- Looking Ahead (Muse. 1986)

With Chico Freeman

- Morning Prayer (India Navigation, 1976)
- Chico (India Navigation, 1977)
- The Outside Within (India Navigation, 1978)
- Kings of Mali (India Navigation, 1978)
- Spirit Sensitive (India Navigation, 1979)
- Destiny's Dance (Contemporary, 1981)

With Hal Galper

- Now Hear This (Enja, 1977)

With Johnny Griffin

- Birds and Ballads (1978)

With Louis Hayes

- Variety Is the Spice (Gryphon, 1978)

With Roy Haynes

- Thank You Thank You (Galaxy, 1977)
- Vistalite (Galaxy, 1977 [1979])

With Andrew Hill

- Compulsion! (Blue Note, 1965)

With Freddie Hubbard and Woody Shaw

- Double Take (Blue Note, 1986)

With Elvin Jones

- Power Trio (Novus, 1990) – with John Hicks
- When I Was at Aso-Mountain (Enja, 1990)
- Elvin Jones Jazz Machine (Trio, 1997)
- It Don't Mean a Thing (Enja, 1993)

With Clifford Jordan

- Two Tenor Winner (Criss Cross, 1984)

With John Klemmer

- Magic and Movement (Impulse!, 1974)

With Prince Lasha

- Inside Story (Enja, 1965 [1981])

With Yusef Lateef

- The Complete Yusef Lateef (Atlantic, 1967)
- The Blue Yusef Lateef (Atlantic, 1968)
- Yusef Lateef's Detroit (Atlantic, 1969)
- The Diverse Yusef Lateef (Atlantic, 1970)

With The Leaders

- Mudfoot (Black Hawk, 1986)
- Out Here Like This (Black Saint, 1987)
- Heaven Dance (Sunnyside, 1988) – The Leaders Trio with pianist Kirk Lightsey and drummer Don Moye
- Unforeseen Blessings (Black Saint, 1988)
- Slipping and Sliding (Sound Hills, 1994)
- Spirits Alike (Double Moon, 2006)

With Dave Liebman

- The Seasons (Soul Note, 1992)
- John Coltrane's Meditations (Arkadia Jazz, 1998)

With Charles Lloyd

- Dream Weaver (1966, Atlantic)
- Forest Flower (1966, Atlantic)
- The Flowering (1966, Atlantic)
- Charles Lloyd in Europe (1966, Atlantic)

With Raphe Malik

- Storyline (Boxholder, 1999) – with Cody Moffett

With Joe Maneri

- Dahabenzapple (hat ART, 1993 [1996])

With Jackie McLean

- It's Time! (Blue Note, 1964)
- Action Action Action (Blue Note, 1964)

With Lloyd McNeill

- Treasures (1976)

With Charles McPherson

- New Horizons (Xanadu, 1977)

With Grachan Moncur III

- Some Other Stuff (Blue Note, 1964)
- Echoes of Prayer (JCOA, 1975) with the Jazz Composer's Orchestra

With Tisziji Munoz

- Rendezvous With Now (India Navigation, 1978)
- Visiting This Planet (Anami Music, 1988)
- Presence of Joy (Anami Music, 1999)
- Divine Radiance (Anami Music, 2003)

With Amina Claudine Myers

- Salutes Bessie Smith (Leo, 1980)

With Art Pepper

- Winter Moon (Galaxy, 1980)

With Dannie Richmond

- "In" Jazz for the Culture Set (Impulse!, 1965)

With Sam Rivers

- Dimensions & Extensions (Blue Note, 1967)
- Streams (Impulse!, 1973)
- Hues (Impulse!, 1973)
- Emanation (NoBusiness, 2019) - Volume 1 of the Sam Rivers Archive Series; recorded in 1971

With Charlie Rouse

- Social Call (Uptown, 1984) with Red Rodney

With Pharoah Sanders

- Izipho Zam (My Gifts) (Strata-East, 1969 [1973])
- Jewels of Thought (Impulse!, 1969)
- Thembi (Impulse!, 1970)
- Black Unity (Impulse!, 1971)
- Live at the East (Impulse!, 1972)
- Village of the Pharoahs (Impulse!, 1973)
- Love in Us All (Impulse!, 1973)
- Wisdom Through Music (Impulse!, 1973)

With Saxophone Summit

- Gathering of Spirits (Telarch, 2004)

With Zbigniew Seifert

- Man of the Light (MPS Records, 1977)

With Woody Shaw

- The Moontrane (Muse, 1974)
- Love Dance (Muse, 1975)
- The Iron Men with Anthony Braxton (Muse, 1977 [1980])

With Archie Shepp

- Lady Bird (Denon, 1978)

With Wayne Shorter

- Et Cetera (Blue Note, 1965)
- Odyssey of Iska (Blue Note, 1970)

With Sonny Simmons

- Burning Spirits (Contemporary, 1971)

With Lonnie Liston Smith

- Astral Traveling (Flying Dutchman, 1973)
- Expansions (Flying Dutchman, 1975)
- Rejuvenation (Doctor Jazz, 1985)
- Make Someone Happy (Doctor Jazz, 1986)

With Buddy Tate and Dollar Brand

- Buddy Tate Meets Dollar Brand (Chiaroscuro, 1977)

With the Bob Thiele Collective

- Sunrise Sunset (Red Baron, 1990)

With Leon Thomas

- Spirits Known and Unknown (1969)

With Horace Tapscott

- The Dark Tree, Vol. 1 & 2 (hatOLOGY, 1989)

With Charles Tolliver

- Live at Slugs', Volume I & II (Strata-East, 1970)
- Music Inc. (Strata-East, 1971)
- Impact (Strata-East, 1975)
- With Love (Blue Note, 2006)

With Mickey Tucker

- Sojourn (Xanadu, 1977)
- Mister Mysterious (Muse, 1978)

With McCoy Tyner

- Quartets 4 X 4 (Milestone, 1980)
- Blues for Coltrane (1987)

With James "Blood" Ulmer

- Revealing (1977)

With Mal Waldron

- What It Is (Enja, 1981)

With Michael White

- The Land of Spirit and Light (Impulse!, 1973)

With Paul Winter

- Jazz Meets the Folk-Song (1963)

With Yōsuke Yamashita

- Sakura (Verve, 1990)
- Kurdish Dance (Verve, 1993)
- Dazzling Days (Verve, 1993)
- Fragments 1999 (Verve, 1999)
- Spider (Verve, 1996)
- Delightful Contrast (Universal, 2011)

With Denny Zeitlin

- Cathexis (Columbia, 1963)

With various artists

- The New Wave in Jazz (Impulse!, 1965)
