= Arthur Blythe =

American jazz saxophonist and composer (1940–2017)

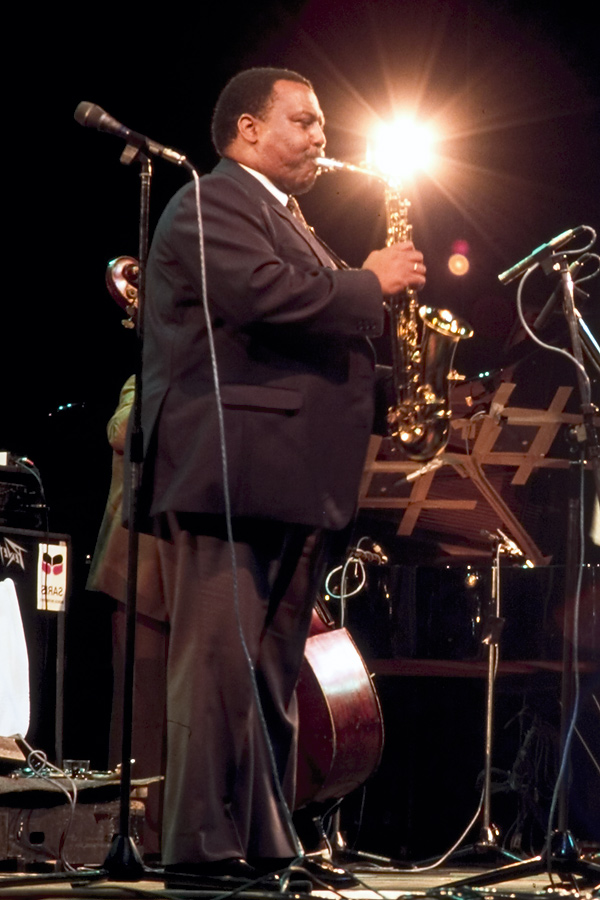
- Blythe at the North Sea Jazz Festival with The Leaders, 1989

Background information
- Also known as: Black Arthur
- Born: Arthur Murray Blythe; July 5, 1940; Los Angeles, California, U.S.
- Died: March 27, 2017 (aged 76) Lancaster, California, U.S.
- Genres: Jazz
- Occupations: Musician, bandleader, composer
- Instrument: Alto saxophone
- Years active: 1969–2017
- Labels: Columbia, Enja, Savant Records
- Formerly of: World Saxophone Quartet

Arthur Murray Blythe (July 5, 1940 – March 27, 2017) was an American jazz alto saxophonist and composer. He was described by critic Chris Kelsey as displaying "one of the most easily recognizable alto sax sounds in jazz, big and round, with a fast, wide vibrato and an aggressive, precise manner of phrasing" and furthermore as straddling the avant garde and traditionalist jazz, often with bands featuring unusual instrumentation.

== Biography ==
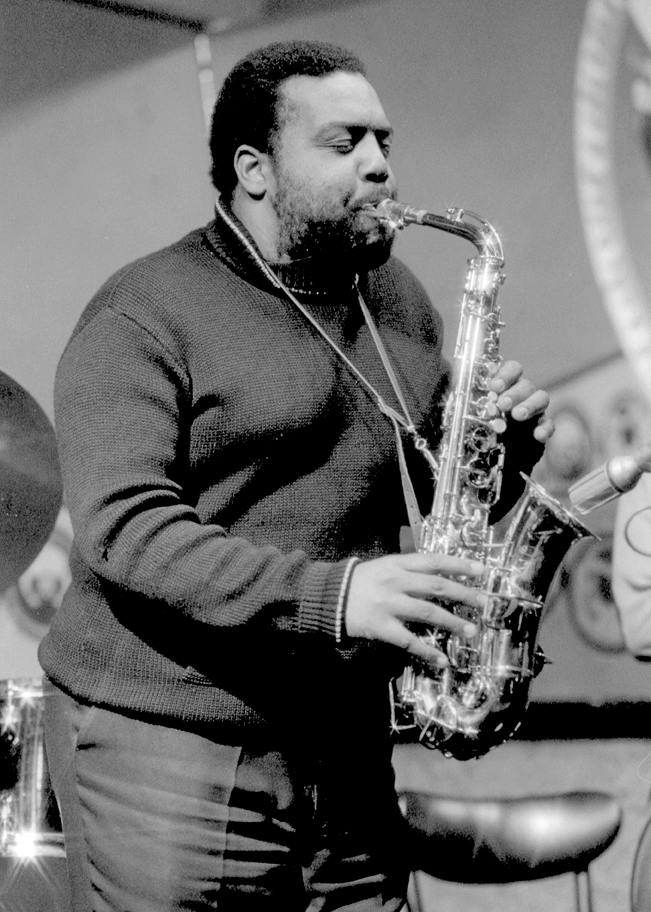
Arthur Blythe at Keystone Korner, San Francisco CA 3/81

Born in Los Angeles, Blythe lived in San Diego, returning to Los Angeles when he was 19 years old. He took up the alto saxophone at the age of nine, playing R&B until his mid-teens when he discovered jazz. In the mid-1960s, Blythe was part of the Underground Musicians and Artists Association (UGMAA), founded by Horace Tapscott, on whose 1969 The Giant Is Awakened he made his recording debut.

After moving to New York in the mid-1970s, Blythe worked as a security guard before being offered a place as sideman for Chico Hamilton (1975–77). He subsequently played with Gil Evans' Orchestra (1976–78), Lester Bowie (1978), Jack DeJohnette (1979) and McCoy Tyner (also 1979). Blythe's group – John Hicks, Fred Hopkins and Steve McCall – played Carnegie Hall and the Village Vanguard in 1979.

In 1977, Blythe appeared on the LP Rhythmatism, a recording led by drummer Steve Reid. Reviewing in Christgau's Record Guide: Rock Albums of the Seventies (1981), Robert Christgau highlighted Blythe's "forceful" alto-saxophone playing and said, "like so many of the new players Blythe isn't limited to modern methods by his modernism—he favors fluent, straight-ahead Coltrane modalities, but also demonstrates why he belongs on a tune for Cannonball."

Blythe began to record as a leader in 1977 for the India Navigation label and then for Columbia Records from 1978 to 1987. Bob Stewart's tuba was a regular feature of these albums, often taking the place of the more traditional string bass. Albums such as The Grip and Metamorphosis (both on the label) demonstrated Blythe's maturity as well as his ability to play in both free and traditional contexts with a fully-developed personal style. Blythe played on many pivotal albums of the 1980s, among them Jack DeJohnette's Special Edition on ECM. Blythe was a member of the all-star jazz group The Leaders and joined the World Saxophone Quartet after the departure of Julius Hemphill. Beginning in 2000 he made recordings on Savant Records which included Exhale (2003) with John Hicks (piano), Bob Stewart (tuba), and Cecil Brooks III (drums).

Blythe died in March, 2017 of complications from Parkinson's disease in Lancaster, California, at the age of 76.

== Discography ==
=== As leader ===
Year	Title	Label
1977	The Grip	India Navigation
1977	Metamorphosis	India Navigation
1977	Bush Baby	Adelphi
1978	In the Tradition	Columbia
1978	Lenox Avenue Breakdown	Columbia
1980	Illusions	Columbia
1981	Blythe Spirit	Columbia
1982	Elaborations	Columbia
1983	Light Blue: Arthur Blythe Plays Thelonious Monk	Columbia
1985	Put Sunshine in It	Columbia
1986	Da-Da	Columbia
1987	Basic Blythe	Columbia
1991	Hipmotism	Enja
1994	Retroflection	Enja
1995	Calling Card	Enja
1996	Synergy	In + Out
1997	Night Song	Clarity
1997	Today's Blues	CIMP
2000	Spirits in the Field	Savant
2001	Blythe Byte	Savant
2002	Focus	Savant
2003	Exhale	Savant

=== Collaborations ===
With Synthesis

- Six by Six (Chiaroscuro, 1977), with Olu Dara, a.o.
- Sentiments (Ra, 1979), with Olu Dara, David Murray, a.o.

With The Leaders

- Mudfoot (Black Hawk, 1986)
- Out Here Like This (Black Saint, 1987)
- Unforeseen Blessings (Black Saint, 1988)
- Slipping and Sliding (Sound Hills, 1994)

With Roots

- Salutes the Saxophone – Tributes to John Coltrane, Dexter Gordon, Sonny Rollins and Lester Young (In & Out, 1992)
- Stablemates (In & Out, 1993)
- Say Something (In & Out, 1995)

With Santi Debriano and Billy Hart

- 3-Ology (Konnex, 1993)

With Jeff Palmer, John Abercrombie, Victor Lewis

- Ease On (AudioQuest Music, 1993)

With David Eyges and Bruce Ditmas

- Synergy (In & Out, 1997)

With John Abercrombie, Terri Lyne Carrington, Anthony Cox, Mark Feldman, Gust Tsilis

- Echoes (Alessa, 2005)

=== As sideman ===
With Barry Altschul

- Another Time/Another Place (Muse, 1978)

With Joey Baron

- Down Home (Intuition, 1997) with Ron Carter and Bill Frisell
- We'll Soon Find Out (Intuition, 1999) with Ron Carter and Bill Frisell

With Lester Bowie

- The 5th Power (Black Saint, 1978)
- African Children (Horo, 1978)

With Jack DeJohnette

- Special Edition (ECM, 1979)

With Gil Evans

- Gil Evans Live at the Royal Festival Hall London 1978 (RCA, 1979)
- The Rest of Gil Evans Live at the Royal Festival Hall London 1978 (Mole Jazz, 1981)
- Parabola (Horo, 1979)
- Live at the Public Theater, Vol. 1 & 2 (Trio (Japan)/Storyville (Sweden), 1980)
- Priestess (Antilles, 1983)
- Sting and Gil Evans – Strange Fruit (ITM, 1993), three tracks with Blythe rec. 1976 without Sting

With John Fischer

- 6 × 1 = 10 Duos for a New Decade (Circle, 1980)

With Chico Freeman

- Luminous (Jazz House, 1989)
- Focus (Contemporary, 1995)

With Chico Hamilton

- Peregrinations (Blue Note, 1975)
- Chico Hamilton and the Players (Blue Note, 1976)

With Craig Harris

- Cold Sweat Plays J. B. (JMT, 1999)

With Julius Hemphill

- Coon Bid'ness (Freedom, 1972)

With Azar Lawrence

- Bridge into the New Age (Prestige, 1974)

With the Music Revelation Ensemble

- In the Name of... (DIW, 1994)
- Knights of Power (DIW, 1996)

With Woody Shaw

- The Iron Men with Anthony Braxton (Muse, 1977 [1980])

With Horace Tapscott

- The Giant is Awakened (Flying Dutchman, 1969)

With Gust William Tsilis & Alithea

- Pale Fire (Enja, 1988)

With McCoy Tyner

- Quartets 4 X 4 (Milestone, 1980)
- 44th Street Suite (Red Baron,1991)

With the World Saxophone Quartet

- Metamorphosis (Elektra Nonesuch, 1990)
- Breath of Life (Elektra Nonesuch, 1992)
