= Francis Wong =

Francis Wong 王世明
- Born: Francis Wong; April 13, 1957; San Francisco, CA, U.S.
- Genres: Jazz
- Occupations: Musician; community organizer; composer; professor of Asian American Studies
- Instruments: Tenor saxophone; flute; erhu
- Years active: 1982 - present
- Labels: Asian Improv Arts; Soul Note; Buzz; Southport; 4 A.M.; Eremite; Grex; FPE
- Website: www.franciswong.net

Francis Wong (Chinese: 王世明; pinyin: Wáng Shìmíng) is an American jazz saxophonist, flutist, and erhu player.

Wong is of Chinese descent; his father is from Shanghai and his mother is Cantonese. He specializes in the fusion of free jazz and Asian musics, and is a central member in the Asian American jazz movement. He has worked with Glenn Horiuchi, Jon Jang, John Tchicai, James Newton, Cecil Taylor, Anthony Brown, and Liu Qi-Chao. He and Jon Jang founded Asian Improv Records in 1987 (now Asian Improv aRts) and both have recorded albums for the label.

Wong lives in South San Francisco, California.

== As a performer ==
Wong is known for his versatility on the saxophone. He can use aggressive-sounding extended techniques, but can also play "so slowly and softly that he dissolves into the group, giving the feeling of an ethereal string ensemble." In an interview, Wong said:

I've put a lot of time into saxophone playing and having an individual sound on the instrument itself. I've gone through a lot of different influences and tried to develop extended techniques in my approach to the horn in order to be able to play the saxophone the way I feel. How can I make the saxophone play in my image? Part of it is getting from the masters certain traditions and sounds. But also, with that sense of control or mastery of the instrument, be able to have come out what's inside of me. Relating that to some sense of self-empowerment with the instrument. This is one of the basic messages of the African American masters. Be yourself. Looking at that whole tradition, every player that has come along to develop his individual sound has had to change the instrument or the way the instrument is played in order to be themself with it.

Central to Wong’s oeuvre is the intercultural cast of his music. The self-defining and uplifting qualities expressed in the music of Charlie Parker, John Coltrane, Sonny Rollins, and later Art Ensemble of Chicago, Cecil Taylor, and Ornette Coleman shaped him as a performer and composer. Asian American musicians felt comfortable exploring their heritage “in the context of African American music” because of prior collaborations such as Nat Janning performing with Cantonese opera musicians in 1968 and John Handy partnering with Ali Akbar Khan in 1973. Musicians found the “moment-to- moment interactions” amongst peers enriching, expanding musical dialogue into unknown sonic territories. Asian American musicians aspired to their African American jazz counterparts’ idea of music’s ability to affirm one’s humanity and culture. For Asian American musicians, that meant experimenting with and incorporating Asian musical instruments, forms, scales, rhythms, and aesthetic concepts into jazz-based music. Part of Wong’s leaning toward intercultural explorations derives in part from the Association for the Advancement of Creative Music’s (AACM) idea of improvisation as a means for cross-cultural communication in developing one’s music. Wong’s albums, Pachinko Dreamtrack 10 with Glenn Horiuchi and Joseph Jarman (1999) and Mo’ Betta Butta with William Roper and Bobby Bradford (2008) represent his interracial and intercultural partnerships, as does the collaborative performance of “4X4,” featuring Wayne Wallace Latin Jazz Quartet meets Francis Wong Special Edition Quartet on May 23, 2012 at the Hall of Culture, African American Arts and Culture Complex. The intercultural mix of Wong’s “Persistence of Vision Project” combined the talents of Tatsu Aoki, Elliott Humberto Kavee, Jon Jang, John Carlos Perea, and Hafez Modirzadeh with poets Lawson Fusao Inada and Genny Lim. The piece was performed for Asian Improv Arts’ 20th Anniversary celebration in September 2007.

As a pioneering member of the Asian American creative music scene in the San Francisco Bay Area, Wong’s interdisciplinary work with other Asian American artists stemmed from the communal activity at the I-Hotel (International Hotel). The community group Kalian Collective joined forces with Asian American gallery artists, poets, dancers, muralists, politicos, college students and Filipino tenants who set up operations in the hotel to save it from urban renewal. The Asian American movement in the 1970s that followed integrated political, social, cultural, and artistic ideas. Many artists spurred by the communal activity and the movement collaborated to create new work. This set the tone for Wong and many Asian American artists, resulting in interdisciplinary works promoted and produced by Asian Improv Arts. “Diaspora Tales #2: 1969” performed in April 2010 is an interdisciplinary piece featuring music by the Francis Wong Unit, spoken word by A.K. Black, dance by Lenora Lee, and media design by Olivia Ting. The project was a commission of the Oakland Asian Cultural Center with a grant from the East Bay Fund for Artists of the East Bay Community Foundation.

Connecting to communities and forming relationships is important to Wong. Newly emerged Asian American creative music burgeoned in the 1970s when African American and Asian American musicians played together in clubs in the historic jazz scene in San Francisco’s Fillmore District and nearby Japantown, linking musicians from Chinatown and Manilatown as well. In striving to promote jazz within Asian communities, Wong and Jon Jang gave jazz workshops and taught instrumental classes as Artists in Residence from 1990 to 1998 at the Cameron House in Chinatown. Through their efforts to integrate Chinese music into jazz, under the auspices of the California Arts Council, the two exercised true citizenship by drawing on their musicianship to enrich the community. The residency engendered the rise of a new generation of artists with whom Wong and Jang have performed – musicians Jeff Chan, Leon Lee, and dancer Lenora Lee. Wong remains committed to community work; he served as resident artist at the Oakland Asian Cultural Center and in Japantown, providing technical assistance to a local taiko drumming group, and teaching music classes and organizing concerts for young students. Performances persist with the support of Asia Improv Arts (AIA) under Wong’s artistic leadership. The “IMPROVISASIANS!” annual series of performances and workshops explore the connection between the performing arts and community building.

== As a community organizer ==
Throughout his career, Wong has helped numerous Asian American small-to-medium non-profits that focus on the arts, culture and heritage. His activities include strategic planning, meeting facilitation, grant writing, communications, operations, project management, and human resources. In 1987, he co-founded Asian Improv aRts (AIR), an organization dedicated to producing, presenting and documenting artistic works that represent Asian American experiences. Among the young artists he mentored at AIR are Vijay Iyer, Miya Masaoka and Jen Shyu. For nearly three decades, he was affiliated with Kularts (1991-2020), a San Francisco-based organization promoting traditional and contemporary Filipino arts, first as manager and later as a long-time Board President. Wong was also the former Co-Director of the Oakland Asian Cultural Center (2000–01).

== As an academic ==
Wong has long been active as a college-level educator. He taught jazz saxophone and jazz ensembles at San Francisco State University (1996–98), where one of his students was the Mescalero Apache jazz composer and bassist John-Carlos Perea. He also taught a course entitled "Aspects of Asian American Culture" at the UC-Santa Cruz (1996-2001). Since 2017, he has been a Lecturer in Asian American Studies at San Francisco State University.

== Personal ==
Wong is married to Julie Yumi Hatta.

== Awards and honors ==
Rockefeller Foundation Next Generation Leadership Fellow (2000-2001)

Senior Fellow, Wildflowers Institute (1999-current)

Ford Foundation Mid-Career Visionary Artist Award (2006)

Jazz Hero - Jazz Journalists Association (2017)

== Discography ==
As Leader or Co-Leader

Year recorded	Title	Ensemble	Label
1993	Great Wall		Asian Improv
1994	Pilgrimage		Music and Arts
1995	Chicago Time Code		Asian Improv
1995	Ming		Asian Improv
1995	Duets I	with Elliot Humberto Kavee	Asian Improv
1995	Lament of Absalom	with William Roper and Elliot Humberto Kavee	Asian Improv
1996	Urban Reception	with Tatsu Aoki and Dave Pavkovic	Southport
1997	Devotee	with Genny Lim	Asian Improv
1999	Graphic Evidence	with Jason Hwang, Tatsu Aoki and Wu Man	Asian Improv
1999	Pachinko Dreamtrack 10	with Glenn Horiuchi and Joseph Jarman	Music and Arts
1999	Gathering of Ancestors	with Elliot Humberto Kavee and John-Carlos Perea	Asian Improv
2003	Purple Gums	with William Roper and Bobby Bradford	Asian Improv
2005	Legends and Legacies		Asian Improv
2008	Mo’ Bettah Butta	with William Roper and Bobby Bradford	Asian Improv
2009	3 big guys + 1	with Jeff Parker, Tatsu Aoki and Elliot Humberto Kavee	Asian Improv
2010	Early Abstractions		Estrada Poznańska
2016	Needs Are Met	with Ari Brown	Asian Improv
2016	Wojtek Trio		Asian Improv
2017	Miyoshi Sketches		Asian Improv
2017	Soundtrack for Light	with Lenora Lee	Asian Improv
2017	Cartography	with William Roper and Glenn Horiuchi	Asian Improv

As Ensemble Performer

Year recorded	Title	Leader / Ensemble(s)	Label
1984	Are You Chinese or Charlie Chan?	Jon Jang Septet	RPM
1988	Next Step	Glenn Horiuchi	Asian Improv
1989	Never Give Up!	Jon Jang	Asian Improv
1989	Oxnard Beet	Glenn Horiuchi	Soul Note
1993	Tiananmen!	Jon Jang	Soul Note
1995	Dew Drop	Glenn Horiuchi	Asian Improv
1995	Memorophilia	Vijay Iyer	Asian Improv
1998	Big Bands Behind Barbed Wire	Asian American Jazz Orchestra	Asian Improv
1999	Infinitesimal Flash	John Tchicai	Buzz
1999	Fair Play	Glenn Horiuchi	Soul Note
1999	Far East Suite	Anthony Brown's Asian American Orchestra	Asian Improv
2002	A Symphony of Cities	Don Moye / Tatsu Aoki	Southport
2002	For Now	Jen Shyu	4 A.M.
2003	H.Con.Res.57/Treasure Box	Alan Silva Celestrial Communications Orchestra	Eremite
2006	Paper Son, Paper Songs	Jon Jang	Asian Improv
2007	Live in Poznan	Tatsu Aoki Miyumi Project	Southport
2008	Live at the Velvet Lounge Volume III	Fred Anderson Quartet	Asian Improv
2009	Horns of Plenty	Jeff Chan	Asian Improv
2013	Taglish	Karl Evangelista	Grex
2014	Shadow to Shadow	Melody Takata	Asian Improv
2019	Boxes	Melody Takata	Asian Improv
2020	Best of the Miyumi Project	Tatsu Aoki	FPE
