= Anthony Brown (jazz musician) =

American jazz musician

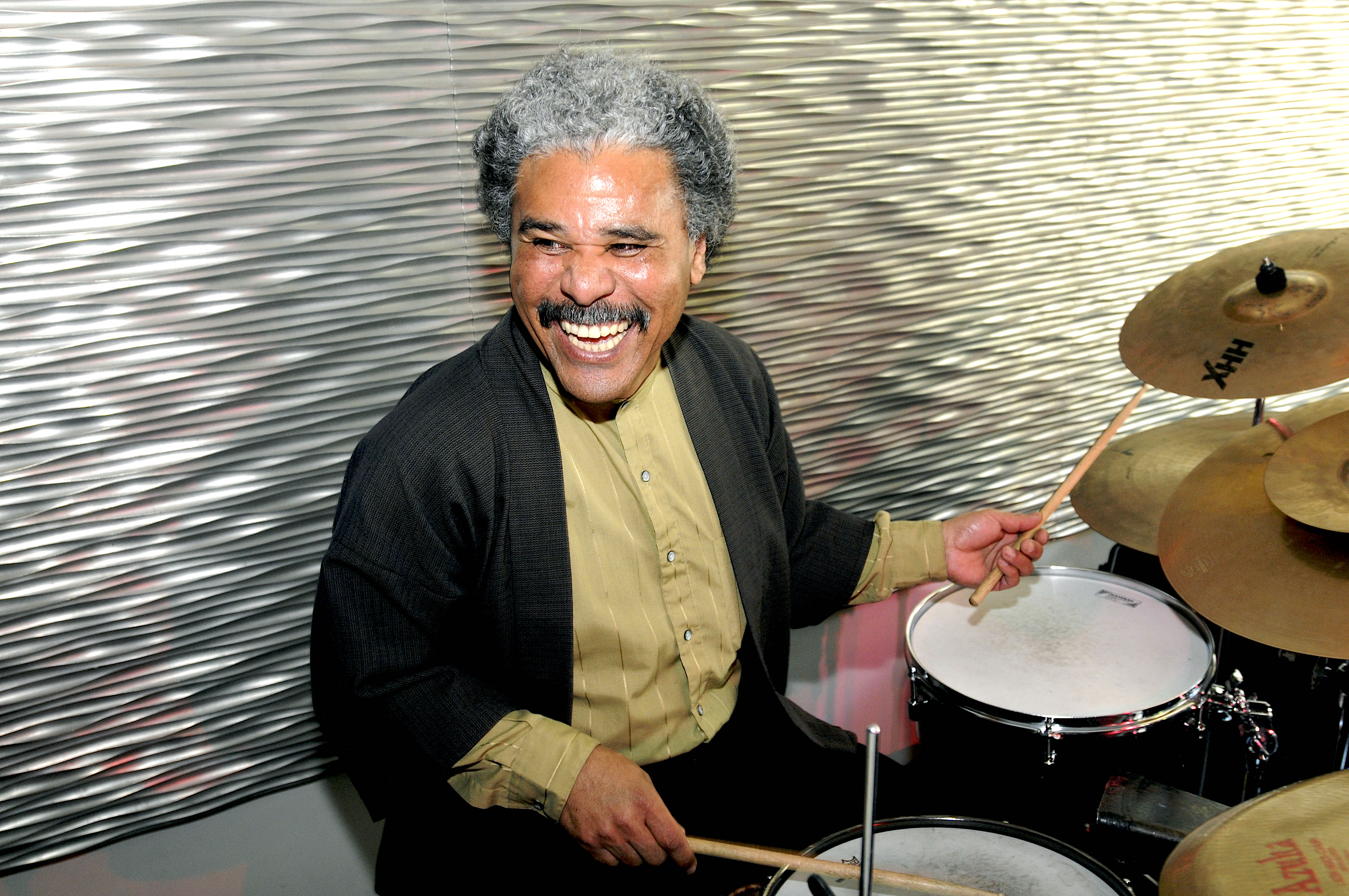

Background information
- Born: March 17, 1953 (age 73); Presidio, San Francisco, California, U.S.
- Genres: Progressive Jazz, World Music
- Occupations: Musician, composer, bandleader, educator
- Instruments: Drums, Percussion
- Years active: 1981–present
- Labels: Water Baby, Asian Improv, RPM, Soul Note, FMP, Hat Art, Gramavision, Sagittarius A-Star, Blue Note
- Website: fifthstreammusic.org
- Education: University of Oregon (BA); Rutgers University (MM); University of California, Berkeley (MA, PhD)

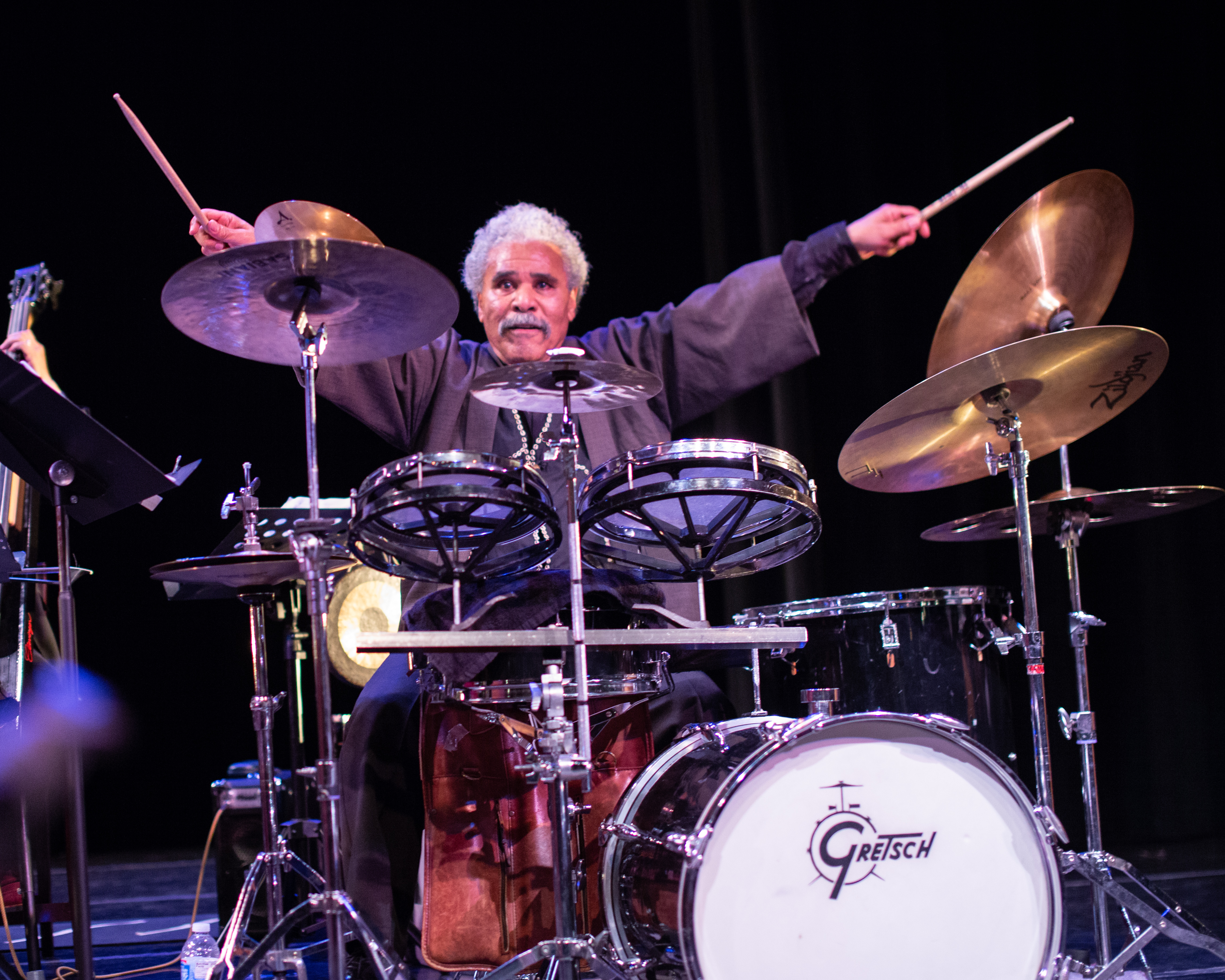
Anthony Brown performing with the Asian American Orchestra in San Francisco, CA

Anthony Brown is an American jazz percussionist, composer, bandleader, ethnomusicologist, and educator. He is known for leading, performing, and recording with the Grammy-nominated Asian American Orchestra since its founding in 1998. His compositions blend jazz instruments and improvisation with traditional Asian instruments and sensibilities, and include musical scores for documentary films, for theatrical and dance premieres, and for spoken word and poetry presentations.

From 1992 to 1996, Brown served as a curator and founding director of the Smithsonian Institution's Jazz Oral History Program. Subsequently, he served as a Smithsonian Associate Scholar presenting concerts and lecture demonstrations for Smithsonian Cultural Festivals nationally, and as the principal interviewer of NEA Jazz Masters for the Jazz Oral History Program until 2012. Brown taught as a visiting professor of music at the University of California, Berkeley, and is professor emeritus of the California Jazz Conservatory.

In 2023, Brown served as a U.S. State Department Cultural Ambassador in Thailand – an honored tradition for jazz musicians including Duke Ellington, Louis Armstrong, Dizzy Gillespie, Dave Brubeck, et al.

== Early life ==
Brown was born in the Presidio in San Francisco, California. His father, Willie Lee Brown, was an African American/Choctaw career soldier who met and married his mother, Sumi Ogita, in her native Tokyo, Japan after World War II. When Brown was nine years old, his father was assigned to Okinawa, Japan for four years, and the family spent summers at his mother's family home in Tokyo. Brown's older brother Mike taught him how to play the guitar and the Blues while in Japan; Mike would later play bass with Bo Diddley. After their father was promoted to Sergeant Major, the Browns returned to California in 1966, living in Los Angeles where Brown switched to drums and performed in Jimi Hendrix/Sly Stone cover bands. In 1970, Brown's father was assigned to Frankfurt, Germany, where Brown graduated from high school as a National Honor Society member in 1971.

== Education and career ==
Brown attended the University of Oregon on an Army ROTC scholarship, earning Bachelor of Science degrees in Music and Psychology. As a student, he studied orchestral percussion with Charles Dowd and performed in touring productions of Leonard Bernstein's "Mass" and Brecht/Weil's "Three Penny Opera".

He was commissioned a Lieutenant in Military Intelligence and assigned to Europe in 1976. While serving in Greece as a NATO Liaison Officer, Brown performed as house drummer at the Jazz Club-Athens. In 1977, Brown assumed command of the US Army Chorus, Europe in Heidelberg, Germany. While living in Europe, he performed and toured with visiting jazz artists James Newton, John Carter, Billy Bang, William Parker and the San Francisco group Cultural Odyssey. Upon completing his military service as a captain in 1980, he returned to San Francisco to pursue his career as a professional musician with groups Cultural Odyssey, United Front and others.

Brown was an early collaborator with the 1980s Asian American Jazz Movement, an outgrowth of the Bay Area's progressive jazz scene allied with Third World student politics in the late 1960s-70s. He toured and recorded internationally with United Front, and performed with the San Francisco Symphony in the premiere of Anthony Davis' "Wayang V" in 1984. Brown also taught drums and percussion at the New College of California in San Francisco with fellow faculty members saxophonist Joe Henderson, pianist Andrew Hill, and trumpeter Eddie Henderson.

Brown moved to New York in 1985 to perform in Anthony Davis' opera, "X, The Life and Times of Malcolm X" at the American Music Theater Festival in Philadelphia. He received a scholarship to attend Rutgers University and was the first graduate of their Masters in Music in Jazz Studies program in 1987, studying drumming with Ed Blackwell and Keith Copeland, and composition with Noel DaCosta. While living in New York, he performed with Kenny Barron, Art Farmer and George 'Big Nick' Nicholas, and performed in Europe with David Ware, Leo Wright, Peter Kowald, Butch Morris, Mark Helias and Tim Berne.

Brown subsequently chose to attend the University of California, Berkeley as a Ford Predoctoral Fellow to study with composer/ethnomusicologist Olly Wilson, African music with CK Ladzekpo, Japanese and North Indian music with Bonnie Wade, and American Indian music with Robert Black. Brown was awarded two research fellowships at the Smithsonian Institution in 1988 and 1989, exploring the origins of the jazz drum set and the newly acquired Duke Ellington collection. In 1989, he participated in the Jazz In July residency program at UMass-Amherst to study with Max Roach, Billy Taylor, Bobby Thomas and Yusef Lateef.

In 1992, Brown accepted employment as a music specialist at the Smithsonian Institution's National Museum of American History, where he also founded the Jazz Oral History Program and toured with the Smithsonian Jazz Trio with fellow musicians Sir Roland Hanna and Keter Betts. While in California he performed with John Handy, Julius Hemphill, Billy Taylor, Calvin Keys and steel pan virtuoso Len 'Boogsie' Sharpe. Brown toured internationally with the Sirone Sextet, Jon Jang's Pan-Asian Arkestra, and Mark Izu's Circle of Fire, recording with them and flautist James Newton.

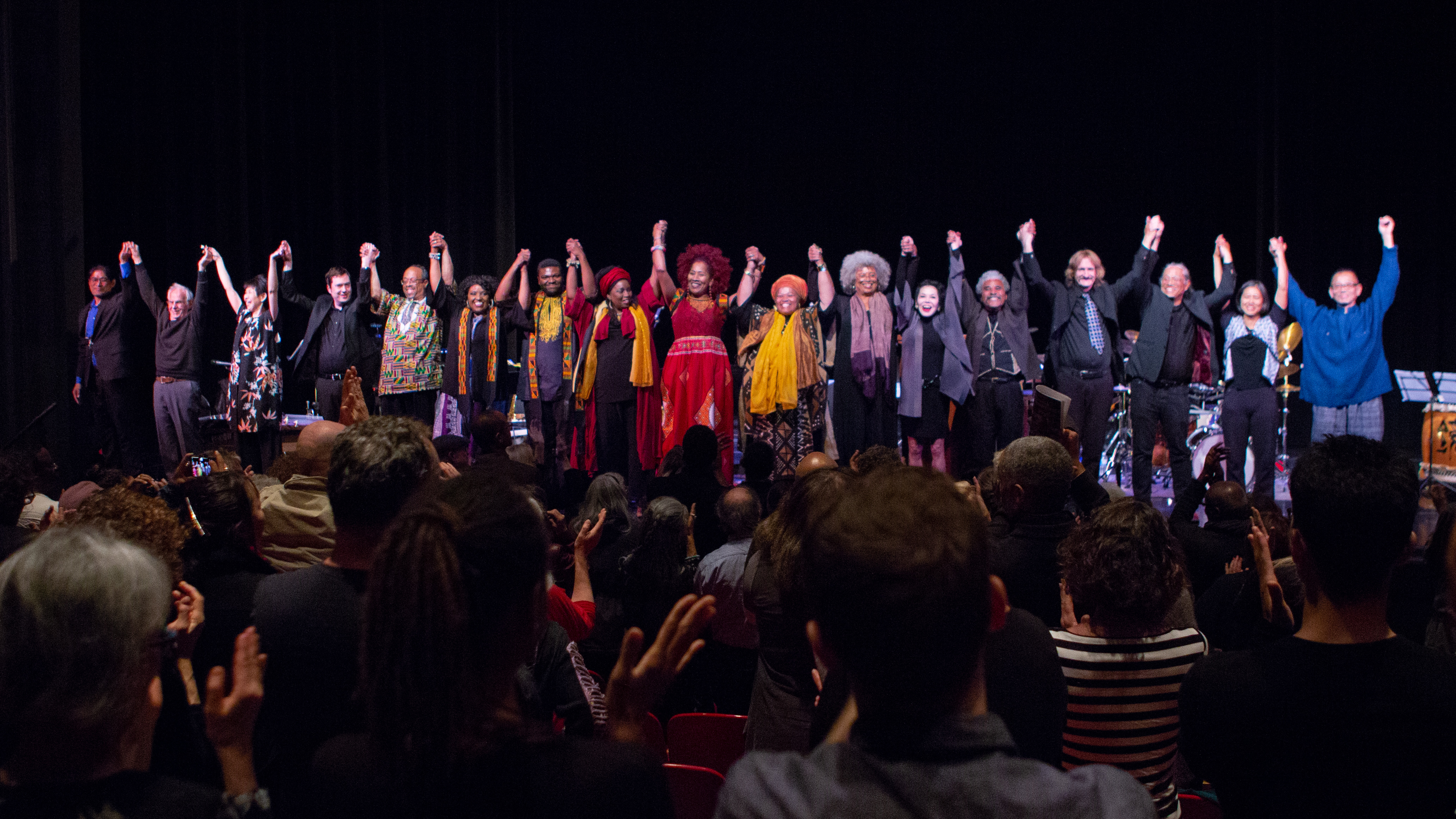
Anthony Brown's Asian American Orchestra and Voices of A Dream with Angela Davis and Janice Mirikitani, San Francisco, 2018

After leading a bi-coastal existence from 1992 to 1996, Brown returned to Berkeley to live with his wife Martha Faller and daughter Aiko Georgia, and complete his PhD in music. He served as the project director of "Big Bands Behind Barbed Wire: Jazz and Justice", a 1997 federally-funded multimedia educational project on the Japanese American incarceration experience during World War II, which birthed the Asian American Jazz Orchestra. With San Jose Taiko, the orchestra toured nationally and recorded the album Big Bands Behind Barbed Wire. After federal funding ended in 1998, Brown maintained the ensemble as Anthony Brown's Asian American Orchestra, touring nationally and recording six CDs. The Asian American Orchestra's interpretation of Duke Ellington's "Far East Suite" was nominated for a 1999 Grammy award. Their next CD, Monk's Moods was co-produced with Orrin Keepnews, featured Steve Lacy and earned a "Five-Star Masterpiece, Best CDs of 2003" rating by Downbeat magazine. Brown received a Guggenheim Fellowship in 2003 to compose "American Rhapsodies", a reimagining of Gershwin's "Rhapsody In Blue" from a 21st-century Pacific Rim perspective. In 2004, Brown founded his own record label, Water Baby Records, to produce subsequent recordings with the Asian American Orchestra, and in 2005, established Fifth Stream Music as a nonprofit organization to administer his performance and educational activities. In 2013, Fifth Stream Music founded the Gospel ensemble, Voices of A Dream (VOAD) to perform Brown's commissioned work, "Our Eyes on the Prize: King's Dream Fifty Years On". Brown's additional performance credits include Cecil Taylor, Max Roach, Pharoah Sanders, Angela Davis, Zakir Hussain, Bobby Hutcherson, Andrew Hill, Henry Butler, Donald Harrison, Art Davis, Oliver Lake, George Lewis, Kurt Elling, Gerald Veasley, Steve Vai, and Wadada Leo Smith's Golden Quartet, poets Sonia Sanchez, Jayne Cortez, San Francisco Poet Laureates Janice Mirikitani and devorah major.

Brown has presented scholarly papers, guest lectures and lecture-demonstrations at the Franz Schubert Conservatory in Vienna, the Academy of Sciences, the Library of Congress and the Smithsonian Institution in Washington, D.C., the Manhattan School of Music, California Institute for the Arts, Columbia and Stanford University, and most campuses of the University of California.

Brown has contributed chapters to John Coltrane and Back America's Quest for Freedom : Spirituality and the Music (Oxford University Press) and The Cambridge Companion to Duke Ellington (Cambridge University Press).

== Discography ==
=== As leader/co-leader ===
- Ohm: Unit of Resistance – United Front (RPM, 1981)
- Live In Berlin – United Front (FMP, 1983)
- Family – Anthony Brown's Eclipse quintet with San Jose Taiko (Asian Improv, 1996)
- Big Bands Behind Barbed Wire – Asian American Jazz Orchestra with San Jose Taiko (Asian Improv, 1998)
- Far East Suite – Asian American Orchestra (Asian Improv, Water Baby 1999)
- Monk's Moods – Asian American Orchestra w/ Steve Lacy (Water Baby, 2002)
- Rhapsodies – Asian American Orchestra w/ David Murray (Water Baby, 2005)
- Ten – Asian American Orchestra w/ Steve Lacy, David Murray (Water Baby, 2008)
- India and Africa: Tribute to John Coltrane – Asian American Orchestra (Water Baby, 2010)
- GO FOR BROKE! by the Asian American Orchestra feat. Janice Mirikitani (Water Baby, 2018)

=== As sideman ===
- Nomadic Winds – George Sams (Hat Art, 1981)
- Crystalization of the Mind – Jason Michaels (S&M, 1981)
- Jang – Jon Jang (RPM, 1982)
- Magnolia – Ray Collins and Autumn (Montclair, 1983)
- Are You Chinese or Charlie Chan? – Jon Jang (Asian Improv, 1983)
- The African Flower – James Newton (Blue Note, 1985)
- Water Mystery – James Newton (Gramavision, 1986)
- Never Give Up! – Jon Jang and the Pan-Asian Arkestra (Asian Improv, 1989)
- Self Defense! – Jon Jang and the Pan-Asian Arkestra (Soul Note, 1991)
- Tiananmen! – Jon Jang and the Pan-Asian Arkestra (Soul Note, 1993)
- Circle of Fire – Mark Izu & Circle of Fire (Asian Improv, 1994)
- What's the Difference Between Stripping and Playing the Violin? – Miya Masaoka (Les Disques Victo, 1998)
- In Xinjiang Time – Betty Ann Wong & Phoenix Spring Ensemble (1998)
- Legends and Legacies – Francis Wong (Asian Improv, 2005)
- Threading Time – Mark Izu (Belly to Belly, 2007)
- Live In Berlin, Ballhaus 1987 – Sirone Sextet (Sagittarius A-Star, 2011)

== Filmography ==
- Outside In Sight: The Music of United Front (1986) Greg Chapnick, Sharon Wood
- Doubles: Japan and America’s intercultural Children (1994) Regge Life
- Don’t Lose Your Soul: The Music of Anthony Brown and Mark Izu (2008) CAAM
- Witness to Hiroshima (2010) Kathy Sloane
- Alternative Facts: The Lies of Executive Order 9066 (2019) Jon Osaki
- Down By The Riverside – Requiem For A King featuring Angela Davis (2019) Fifth Stream Music
- GO FOR BROKE! A Tribute to Nisei Soldiers featuring Janice Mirikitani (2019) Fifth Stream Music

== Dance Commissions ==
- Igniting the Spirit (1986) José Limón Dance Studio, New York
- Between Me and the Other World (2013) Zaccho Dance Theater, San Francisco
- Cross Currents (2015) Dimensions Dance Theater, Oakland
- Port of Embarkation (2016) Zaccho Dance Theater, San Francisco

== Theater Commissions ==
- The Legacy Codes (2003) Theatre Works, Silicon Valley
- After The War (2007) American Conservatory Theater, San Francisco
