= Jay Hoggard =

American jazz vibraphonist

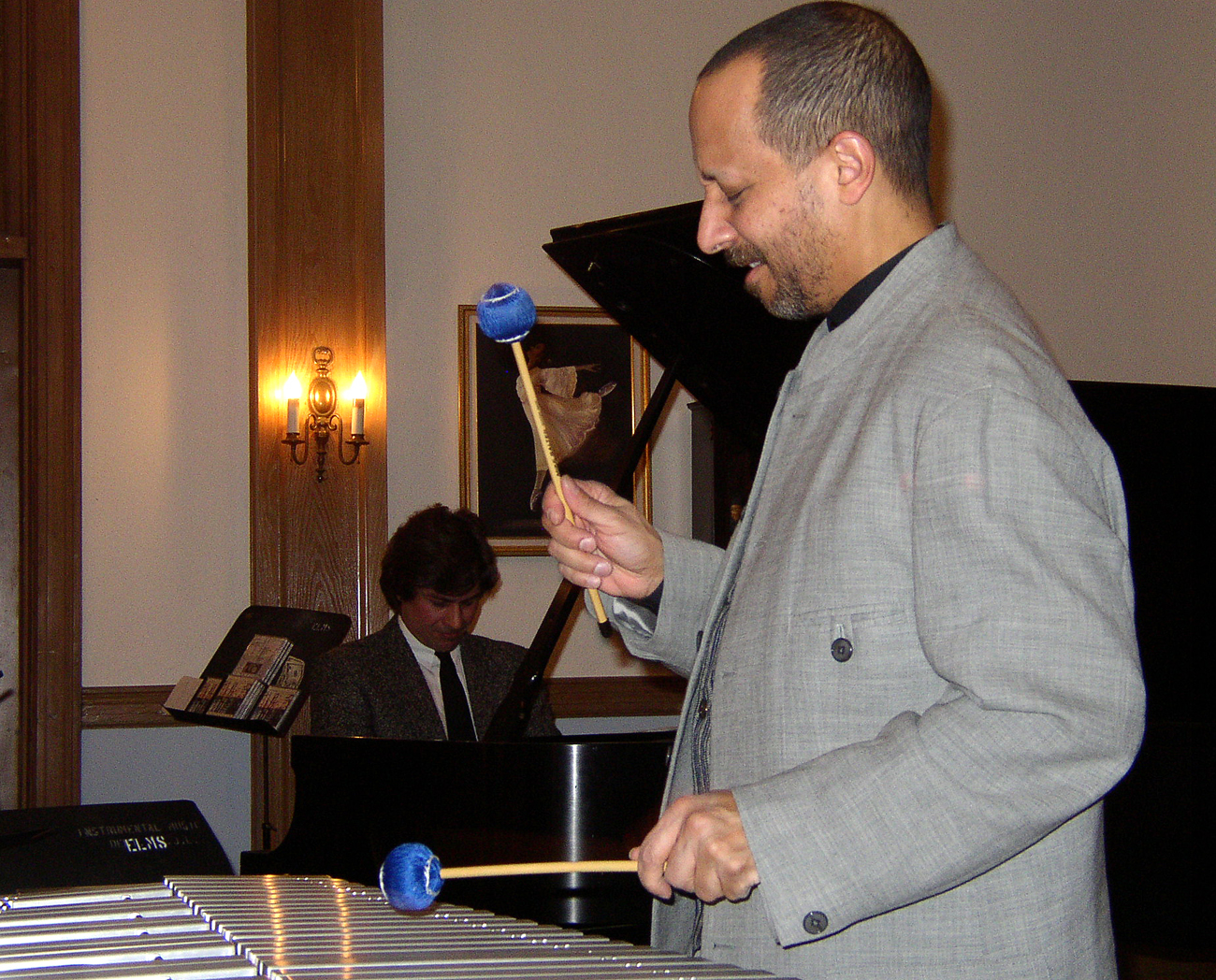
- Jay Hoggard performs with Christopher Bakriges in the background on piano at College of the Elms in Chicopee, Massachusetts on February 24, 2005.

Background information
- Born: September 24, 1954 (age 71); Washington, D.C.
- Genres: Jazz
- Occupation: Musician
- Instrument: Vibraphone
- Website: jayhoggard.com

Jay Hoggard (born September 24, 1954) is an American jazz vibraphonist.

== Biography ==
Jay Hoggard was raised in a religious family. He was born in Washington, D.C., but grew up in Mount Vernon, New York. His mother taught him how to play piano at a young age. At the age of 15, he started to play the vibraphone.

Hoggard played piano and saxophone before turning to vibraphone. He worked with Anthony Davis and Leo Smith in the early 1970s in New England. After moving to New York City in 1977, he worked again with Davis and with Chico Freeman, Sam Rivers, Cecil Taylor, James Newton, and Kenny Burrell. He has worked with vibraphonists such as Lionel Hampton, Milt Jackson, Tito Puente and Bobby Hutcherson.

Hoggard has played in venues in Africa, South America, Europe, Asia and the Caribbean. In the United States, he has performed at the Kennedy Center in Washington D.C., the Lincoln Center in New York City, and the Schomburg Center for Research in Black Culture in New York City. He has performed at jazz festivals such in St. Lucia, Montreux, Mount Fuji, Pori, and Hartford, Connecticut. He has appeared on television on CBS Sunday Morning and BET Jazz.

Hoggard is a professor of Music and African-American Studies at Wesleyan University in Middletown, CT, where he has taught since 1991.

== Discography ==
=== As leader ===
- Solo Vibraphone (India Navigation, 1979)
- Days Like These (Arista GRP, 1979)
- Rain Forest (Contemporary, 1981)
- Under the Double Moon with Anthony Davis (MPS, 1981)
- Mystic Winds, Tropic Breezes (India Navigation, 1982)
- Riverside Dance (India Navigation, 1985)
- Overview (Muse, 1989)
- The Little Tiger (Muse, 1991)
- The Fountain (Muse, 1992)
- In the Spirit (Muse, 1993)
- Love Is the Answer (Muse, 1994)
- A Night in Greenwich Village (Muse, 1996)
- Soular Power (JHVM, 2008)

=== As sideman ===
With Ahmed Abdullah

- Life's Force (About Time, 1979)

With Angelo Badalamenti

- Twin Peaks: Fire Walk with Me (Warner Bros., 1992)
- Twin Peaks: Season Two Music and More (David Lynch 2007)

With Taylor Ho Bynum

- Other Stories (Three Suites) (482 Music, 2005)
- Enter the Plustet (Firehouse 12 2016)

With Anthony Davis

- Song for the Old World (India Navigation, 1978)
- Episteme (Gramavision, 1981)

With Chico Freeman

- Kings of Mali (India Navigation, 1978)
- No Time Left (Black Saint, 1979)
- Peaceful Heart, Gentle Spirit (Contemporary, 1980)
- The Search (India Navigation, 1983)
- Tangents (Elektra Musician, 1984)
- Spirit Sensitive (India Navigation, 1988)

With James Newton

- James Newton (Gramavision, 1983)
- Luella (Gramavision, 1984)
- The African Flower (Blue Note, 1985)
- Romance and Revolution (Blue Note, 1987)

With others

- Anthony Braxton, 4 (Ensemble) Compositions 1992 (Black Saint, 1993)
- Kenny Burrell, Guiding Spirit (Contemporary, 1990)
- Color Me Badd, Time and Chance (Giant, 1993)
- Will Downing, Come Together As One (Island, 1989)
- Roberta Flack, Bustin' Loose (MCA, 1981)
- Jerome Harris, In Passing (Muse, 1990)
- Gerry Hemingway, Kwambe (Auricle, 1978)
- Terumasa Hino, Spark (Somethin' Else, 1994)
- Michael Gregory Jackson, Gifts (Arista Novus, 1979)
- Oliver Lake, Talkin' Stick (Passin' Thru, 2000)
- Candi Staton, Candi Staton (Warner Bros., 1980)
- Clifford Thornton, Communications Network (Third World 1972)
