= Hidden Voices =

Hidden Voices may refer to:

- Hidden Voices (album), 1979 Anthony Davis and James Newton quartet album
- Hidden Voices (game show), Vietnamese music game show series 2016-2020
