= Glenn Horiuchi =

American jazz musician

Glenn Horiuchi

Glenn Horiuchi (February 27, 1955 – June 3, 2000) was an American jazz pianist, composer, and shamisen player. He was a central figure in the development of the Asian American jazz movement.

He gave performances all around the world for example at the Berlin Jazz Festival, Vancouver Jazz Festival, Mexico's Japan Fest, Seattle's Earshot Festival, Asian American Jazz Festival in San Francisco and Chicago, New York's Japan and Asia Societies, Los Angeles Festival, at Yale University, and Brown University.

Horiuchi performed with Joseph Jarman, Wadada Leo Smith, George E. Lewis, John Tchicai, Art Davis, Francis Wong, Miya Masaoka, Tatsu Aoki, William Roper, Mark Izu, and San Jose Taiko. He recorded for the Asian Improve and Soul Note labels.

He also lectured and gave workshops at universities around the U.S. such as U.C. Berkeley, Wesleyan University, Northeastern University, and Stanford University. Horiuchi had many diverse talents and interests: besides attending graduate school in mathematics he had work experience as an auto mechanic, construction worker, and music teacher. He also had a long history of student and community activism including the campaign for Japanese Americans to win Redress/Reparations for the World War II incarceration in American concentration camps.

He served as an Artist in Residence teaching at the Japanese American National Museum in Los Angeles, California. He was also a Zen practitioner of the Kwan Um School of Zen.

Horiuchi was diagnosed with colorectal cancer in August 1999, and died on June 3, 2000. His final concert was held at the Japan America Theater a few months before his death.

== Discography ==
=== As leader/co-leader ===
Year recorded	Title	Label	Personnel/Notes
1988	Oxnard Beet	Soul Note	With Francis Wong (tenor sax, flute), Taiji Miyagawa (bass), Leon Alexander (drums, vibes)
1988?	Next Step	Asian Improv	
1989?	Manzanar Voices	Asian Improv	
1989?	Issei Spirit	Asian Improv	
1991	Poston Sonata	Asian Improv	with Lillian Nakano (shamisen)
1992?	Little Tokyo Suite	Asian Improv	cassette only
1993?	Live in Berlin	Asian Improv	cassette only. With Francis Wong (tenor sax), Lillian Nakano (Shamisen)
1994–95	Dewdrop	Asian Improv	With William Roper (tabla, vocals), Francis Wong (tenor sax, clarinet, flute, vocals), Joseph Mitchell (percussion)
1994–95	Kenzo's Vision	Asian Improv	with Francis Wong (tenor sax)
1995	Elegy for Sarajevo	Asian Improv	With William Roper (tabla, vocals), Francis Wong (tenor sax, clarinet, flute, vocals), Joseph Mitchell (percussion)
1995	Hilltop View	Music & Arts	
1995	Calling Is It and Now	Soul Note	With Francis Wong (tenor sax), Anders Swanson (bass), Jeanette Wrate (drums)
1996	Mercy	Music & Arts	with Francis Wong, Joseph Jarman (alto sax)
1998?	Pachinko Dream Track 10	Music & Arts	Jarman/Horiuchi/Wong
1999	Fair Play	Soul Note	With William Roper (tabla, vocals), Francis Wong (tenor sax, flute, vocals), Jeanette Wrate (drums, vocals)

=== As a sideman ===
What's the Difference Between, Miya Masaoka, Victo 0058, 1998

Golden Hearts Remembrance, Leo Smith, Chap Chap CPCD 002, 1997

Pilgrimage, Francis Wong, Music and Arts CD-974, 1997

Devotee, Francis Wong/ Genny Lim, Asian Improv AIR-0030, 1997

The Asian American Experience, Primary Source Media 7909 (CD-Rom), 1997

Sounds like 1996: Music by Asian American Artists, IEL 0002 1996

RMB Sampler, various artists, Marc Sabatella, 1996

Family, Anthony Brown, Asian Improv AIR-0027, 1996

Ming, Francis Wong, Asian Improv AIR-0020, 1995

== See also ==
- Asian American jazz
