= India Navigation =

American record company and label

- Founded: 1972
- Founder: Bob Cummins
- Status: Inactive
- Genre: Jazz
- Country of origin: U.S.
- Location: Nyack, New York

India Navigation was an American record company and independent record label that specialized in avant-garde jazz in the 1970s and 1980s. It was founded by Bob Cummins, a corporate lawyer who helped jazz musicians with legal matters. Its catalogue included Arthur Blythe, Pharoah Sanders, Hamiet Bluiett, Chico Freeman, Cecil McBee, and the Revolutionary Ensemble. In addition to this, some recordings of minimal music, such as Arnold Dreyblatt, Phill Niblock and Joseph Celli, or Tom Johnson, also appeared.

== Discography ==
Catalog	Artist	Album	Year
1023	Revolutionary Ensemble	Manhattan Cycles	1972
1024	Alan Braufman	Valley of Search	1975
1025	Hamiet Bluiett	Endangered Species	1976
1026	David Murray	Flowers for Albert	1976
1027	Pharoah Sanders	Pharoah	1976
1028	Leroy Jenkins	Solo Concert	1977
1029	Arthur Blythe	The Grip	1977
1030	Hamiet Bluiett	Birthright: A Solo Blues Concert	1977
1031	Chico Freeman	Chico	1977
1032	David Murray	Live at the Lower Manhattan Ocean Club Vol. 1	1977
1033	Joseph Jarman & Don Moye	Egwu-Anwu	1978
1034	Tisziji Muñoz	Rendezvous with Now	1978
1035	Chico Freeman	Kings of Mali	1977
1036	Anthony Davis	Song for the Old World	1978
1037	James Newton	Paseo del Mar	1978
1038	Arthur Blythe	Metamorphosis	1977
1039	Hamiet Bluiett	S.O.S. – We Have Come to Save You from Yourselves	1977
1040	Jay Hoggard	A Solo Vibes Concert	1978
1041	Anthony Davis/James Newton Quartet	Hidden Voices	1979
1042	Chico Freeman	The Outside Within	1978
1043	Cecil McBee	Alternate Spaces	1979
1044	David Murray	Live at the Lower Manhattan Ocean Club Vol. 2	1977
1045	Chico Freeman	Spirit Sensitive	1979
1046	James Newton	The Mystery School	1979
1047	Anthony Davis	Lady of the Mirrors	1980
1048	Amiri Baraka	New Music – New Poetry	1980
1049	Jay Hoggard	Mystic Winds, Tropic Breezes	1980
1050	Bob Neloms	Pretty Music	1981
1051	James Newton	Portraits	1982
1052	Chet Baker & Lee Konitz	In Concert	1974
1053	Cecil McBee	Flying Out	1982
1054	Ted Curson	Ted Curson & Co.	1976
1055	Dennis Moorman	Circle of Destiny	
1056	Anthony Davis	Variations in Dream-Time	1982
1057	Air	Air Song	1975
1058	Muhal Richard Abrams	Afrisong	1975
1059	Chico Freeman	The Search	1982
1060	Craig Harris	Aboriginal Affairs	1983
1061	Big Nick Nicholas	Big and Warm	1983
1062	Clarinet Summit	In Concert at the Public Theater	1981
1063	Chico Freeman	Morning Prayer	1976
1064	Air	Air Raid	1976
1065	Alvin Batiste	Musique d'Afrique Nouvelle Orléans	1985
1066	Big Nick Nicholas	Big Nick	1985
1067	Clarinet Summit	In Concert at the Public Theater Vol. 2	1981
1068	Jay Hoggard	Riverside Dance	1985
1069	Alvin Batiste	Bayou Magic	1988
1070	Chico Freeman and Von Freeman	Freeman and Freeman	1981
1071	Chico Freeman	Still Sensitive	
1072	Hamiet Bluiett	Im/possible to Keep	1977
3023	Tom Johnson	Nine Bells	1982
3024	Arnold Dreyblatt	Nodal Excitation	1982
3025	Yoshi Wada	Lament for the Rise and Fall of the Elephantine Crocodile	1981
3026	Phill Niblock	Nothin' to Look at Just a Record	
3027	Phill Niblock & Joseph Celli	Niblock for Celli: Celli Plays Niblock	1984
