= Axum (disambiguation) =

Axum may refer to:

- Axum, a city in northern Ethiopia also sometimes spelt as Aksum
- Kingdom of Aksum, a nation in northeastern Africa in the first millennium AD
- Axum (programming language), a programming language from Microsoft
- Axum (Star Wars planet), fictional planet within the Star Wars universe
- Axum, an Israeli hip hop/reggae band whose members are of Ethiopian and Moroccan/Yemeni descent
- Italian submarine Axum
- Axum (album by James Newton)
