= Liu Qichao =

Chinese-born American musician

Liu Qichao (simplified Chinese: 刘起超; traditional Chinese: 劉起超; pinyin: Liú Qǐchāo; born in Shandong) is a Chinese-born American musician. He graduated from the Shanghai Conservatory of Music. He now lives in Los Angeles.

== Instruments ==
Liu performs on an array of traditional Chinese instruments, including wind instruments: dizi, suona, sheng, bawu, xun, and xiao; stringed instruments: erhu, guzheng, and sanxian; and percussion: Chinese drums, cymbals, gongs, and woodblocks.

== Performances ==
In addition to his traditional performances, he has also worked in cross-cultural projects, collaborating with the Kronos Quartet, Jon Jang and the Pan Asian Arkestra, and the African Chinese Sextet featuring flutist James Newton. Due to his special interest in jazz, he has become associated with the Asian American jazz movement. Liu also leads his own ensemble, Chi Music.

== Works ==
In the 1970s, a revival for the zheng instrument came about in China, as asked for by the government. Qichao wrote a zheng composition during the period called Caoyuan Yingxiong Xiao Jiemei ("The Heroic Sisters from the Grassland").

== Legacy ==
A book was written by Weihua Zhang titled Music making as an expression of a changing Asian American identity: the music of Liu Qichao and Lee Pui Ming that prominently featured Qichao and his music.

== Personal life ==
His wife was the late Zhang Yan (张燕, 1945–1996), a guzheng player.
