= Chico (album) =

1977 live album by Chico Freeman

Live album by Chico Freeman
- Released: 1977
- Recorded: 1977
- Genre: Jazz
- Length: 41:41
- Label: India Navigation
- Producer: India Navigation

Chico Freeman chronology
Morning Prayer (1976)	Chico (album) (1977)	Beyond the Rain (1977)

Professional ratings
Review scores
Source	Rating
Allmusic	4/5 stars
The Rolling Stone Jazz Record Guide	4/5 stars

Chico is a post-bop jazz lp by Chico Freeman on India Navigation Records IN 1031 -on which Chico switches between tenor saxophone, bass clarinet and flute during long, explorative tracks.

The LP consists of compositions by Mr. Freeman and his frequent bassist, Cecil McBee. All of side 2 was recorded in concert in New York City.

== Criticism ==
Jazz critic Scott Yanow wrote: “Freeman shows why he was rated so high during this early productive period.”

== Background ==
The album is part of the AACM American experimental music group movement, whose motto is "Great Black Music, Ancient to the Future."

== Track listing ==
1. "Moments" (Freeman, McBee) – 16:31
  - a) Generation
  - b) Regeneration
2. "And All The World Moved…" (Freeman, McBee) – 9:05
3. "Merger" (Freeman)– 16:05

=== Reissues ===
An audio cd of this record was released in 1992 and again in 2000 by India Navigation, with the 24-minute, three-part "Moments" expanded by 7:23 for the reissue.

== Personnel ==
- Chico Freeman - tenor saxophone, flute, bass clarinet
- Cecil McBee – bass
- Muhal Richard Abrams – piano
- Steve McCall - drums
- Tito Sampa - percussion

== Production ==
- India Navigation Company
- Cover art: James Russell
