= Big Nick =

Big Nick may refer to:

== People ==
- Big Nick Nicholas (1922–1997), a jazz saxophonist
- John Nicholls (footballer) (born 1939), a former Australian rules footballer for Carlton

== Other uses ==
- "Big Nick", a composition by John Coltrane featured on the album Duke Ellington & John Coltrane dedicated to the jazz saxophonist known as "Big Nick"
