= A Symphony of Cities =

Studio album by Famoudou Don Moye and Tatsu Aoki
- Released: 2002
- Recorded: 2000
- Studio: Sparrow Sound Design, Chicago, Illinois
- Genre: Free jazz
- Length: 1:11:46
- Label: Southport Records; S-SSD 0096

A Symphony of Cities is an album by percussionist Famoudou Don Moye and bassist Tatsu Aoki. It was recorded in 2000 at Sparrow Sound Design in Chicago, Illinois, and was released on CD in 2002 by Southport Records. On the album, Moye and Aoki are joined by saxophonist Francis Wong and flutist Joel Brandon.

== Reception ==
In a review for All About Jazz, Jim Santella called the album "a symphony of African and Asian sounds that can easily be considered representative of every large population center," and wrote: "The African-Asian concept Moye and Aoki reveal with their first track is but one part of the formula. Their true spirit lies in every corner of the globe, and this recommended session remains accessible to all."

AAJ writer Mark F. Turner stated: "The sound of this recording is also a real treat as each instrument’s powerful and intricate voice comes through and transports the listener to another environment. The infectious percussion and interesting rhythms combined with a global yet urban flavor make A Symphony of Cities a unique and rewarding musical experience."

Writing for Jazz Times, Larry Appelbaum praised Moye's "Ode to Wilbur Ware", calling it "a moving tribute to another great Chicago bassist," and commenting: "it's altogether appropriate that Aoki should lay down a spare, deep ostinato, leaving Brandon and Wong to play the melody and dart around one another." He also noted that "it's good to see creative musicians in communities across the country collaborating and creating their own opportunities in the face of a record industry dominated by global media giants."

== Track listing ==
1. "Afro Asian Reflections" (Tatsu Aoki / Famoudou Don Moye) – 24:04
2. "Promise" (Tatsu Aoki / Famoudou Don Moye) – 14:04
3. "Ode to Wilbur Ware" (Famoudou Don Moye) – 16:23
4. "Tokyomad Tonal Efficiency" (Tatsu Aoki / Joel Brandon / Famoudou Don Moye / Francis Wong) – 12:16
5. "Soba Soba" (Tatsu Aoki / Famoudou Don Moye) – 4:59

== Personnel ==
- Famoudou Don Moye – drums, percussion
- Tatsu Aoki – acoustic bass, percussion
- Francis Wong – tenor saxophone
- Joel Brandon – flute, whistle
