= Brenda Wong Aoki =

American dramatist (born 1953)

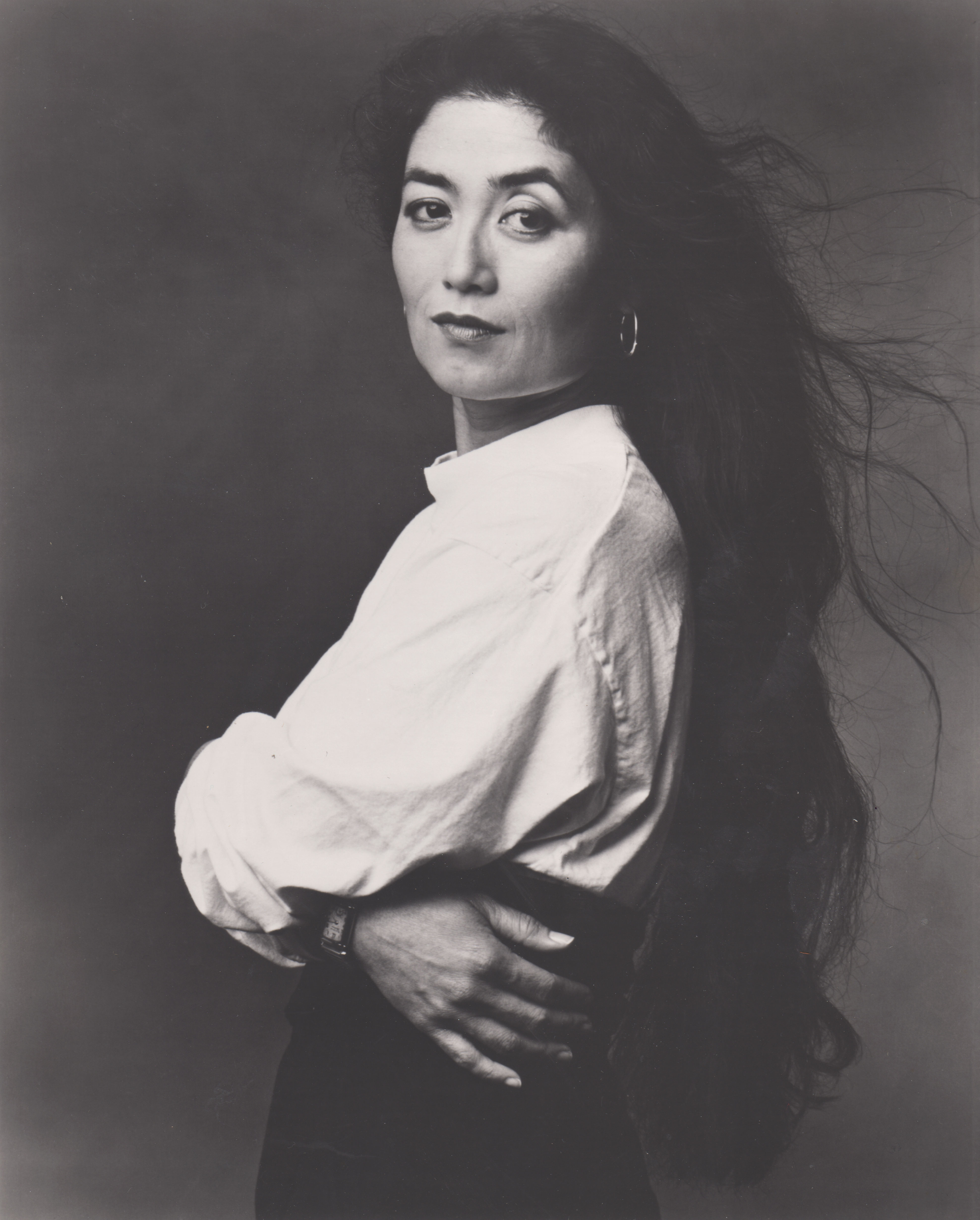
- Born: July 29, 1953 (age 73); Salt Lake City, Utah, U.S.
- Occupations: Artistic director, First Voice
- Notable work: The Queen’s Garden; Mermaid Meat
- Style: Noh, kyōgen, and contemporary storytelling
- Spouse: Mark Izu
- Children: Kai Kane Aoki Izu

Brenda Wong Aoki is an American playwright, actor and storyteller. She creates monodramas rooted in traditional storytelling, dance movement, and music. Aoki's work combines Eastern and Western narratives and theatrical traditions such as noh, kyogen, commedia dell'arte, modern dance, Japanese drumming, and American jazz. Most of her performances express themes of history, mixed race, home, gender, and mythology. Aoki is a founding faculty member of the Institute for Diversity in the Arts at Stanford University. Aoki and her husband Mark Izu, an Emmy-winning jazz music composer, are the founders of First Voice, a San Francisco-based nonprofit arts organization.

== Early life and education ==
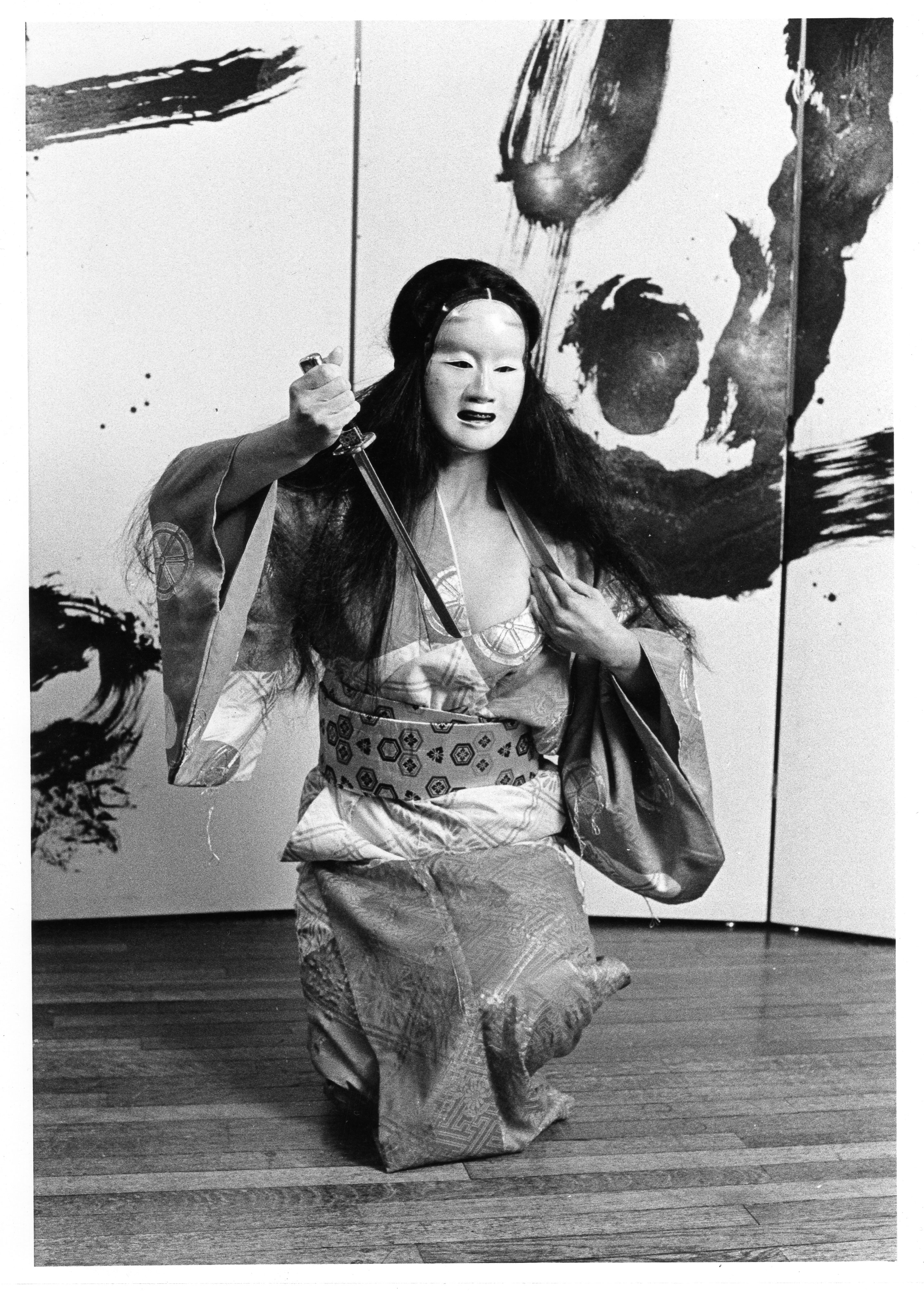
Brenda-Wong-Aoki-noh-gaku

Brenda Wong Aoki was born in Salt Lake City, Utah, and grew up in Long Beach, California. Aoki is of Japanese, Chinese, Spanish, and Scottish descent, and she is the eldest of six children. Aoki's paternal grandfather was a founder of San Francisco's Japantown in the 1890s.

Aoki graduated in 1976 from University of California,Santa Cruz, with a bachelor's degree in Community Studies. She later received a K-12 credential from San Francisco State University. She spent years as a community organizer working with at-risk-youth at Centro De La Raza and then as a public school teacher with the Long Beach Unified School District and San Francisco Unified School District, while continuing her activities as a poet, dancer, musician, singer and activist. [10] She taught one of the first Asian American Women's Studies Class in the country at San Francisco State University.

Aoki sought to trace her family history by consulting with relatives and finding information from archived newspapers at the San Francisco Public Library. In Japan, the Aoki family had been “Hidden Christians” and kept the faith during the 200-year period of Japan's persecution of Christians and isolation from the West. As a result, Aoki's paternal grandfather, Chojiro Peter Aoki, was sent from Japan in 1897 to become the leader of Seiko Ko Kai, the Japanese Episcopal mission, a founding institution of Japantown, San Francisco. Father Aoki was one of the first fully ordained Japanese Christian ministers In 1909, her great-uncle Gunjiro Aoki, a Japanese immigrant, became engaged to Helen Gladys Emery, the Caucasian daughter of Grace Cathedral's archdeacon. The engagement incited public outcry and resulted in Californian legislation adding Japanese immigrants to the list of races banned from marrying white citizens; a law that remained in effect until 1948. Father Aoki was asked to resign because of his support for his younger brother's marriage to a white woman. Banished by Grace Cathedral, he was sent to Utah where he and his wife died shortly after, leaving 11 children orphaned. Aoki developed a play based on her family's history that she began performing in 1998 called “Uncle Gunjiro’s Girlfriend.”

== Career in theatre ==
Aoki's performances combine traditional Japanese theater styles of Noh and Kyogen with contemporary storytelling. Her style uses dance, music and theater with few props, exaggerated movements, and simple sets. Aoki traveled to Japan to study Japanese theater. Additionally, Aoki studied with Mansaku Nomura and completed an apprenticeship with Yuriko Doi's Theater of Yugen in San Francisco in the 1970s. She studied Nohgaku with Living Treasure Mansaku Nomura at Chusonji, a UNESCO World Heritage Site.

Aoki began performing in 1976 and was a founding member of the Asian American Dance Collective, the Asian American Theatre Company and Dell Arte Players Company. In 1988, she launched her solo career. She was the first storyteller of Asian Pacific heritage to perform at the NAPPS National Storytelling Festival (National Association for the Preservation and Perpetuation of Storytelling) in Jonesborough, Tennessee. These sojourns brought her to the realization that America is in need of a new cosmology that includes the experience of all its people.

== Works ==
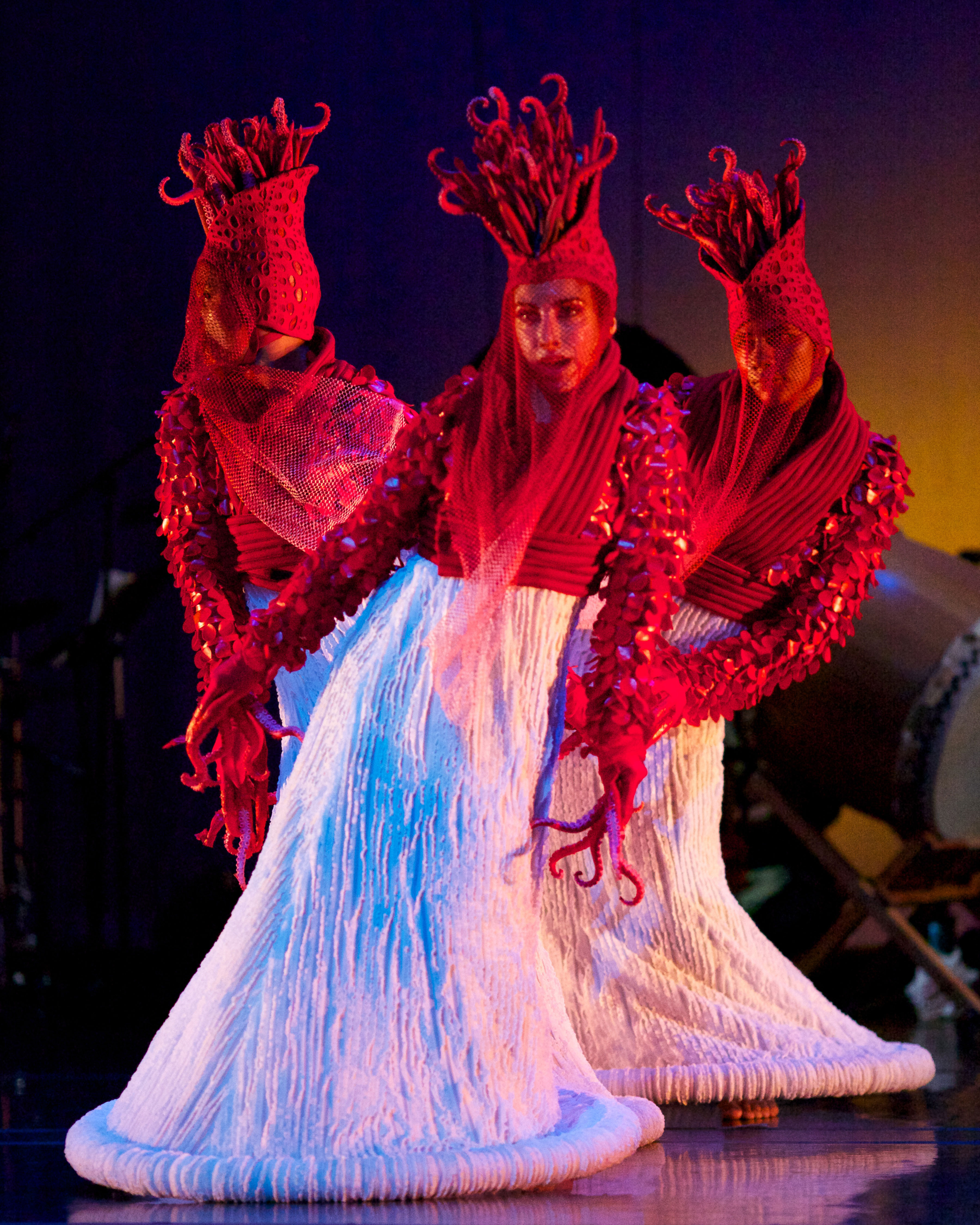
Brenda-Wong-Aoki-MU-red-tipped-worms

Aoki's multidisciplinary performances combine Japanese Noh, Kyogen Theater, Commedia dell'arte, movement and voice. She uses dance, music and theater with few props, exaggerated movements, and simple sets. She has performed in such as venues the Kennedy Center, New Victory Theater on Broadway, Hong Kong Performing Arts Center, the Adelaide International Festival in Australia, the Esplanade in Singapore, the Graz Festival Austria and the International House in Tokyo. Aoki's plays have been produced worldwide: Mermaid, a work for symphony, was commissioned by Maestro Kent Nagano, The Queen's Garden was published by Routledge Press and produced at the San Diego Repertory Theatre, Uncle Gunjiro's Girlfriend was the American representative to the Adelaide International Festival, Australia, Random Acts was produced by the Dallas Theater Center, Kuan-Yin: Our Lady of Compassion, a dual commission between Hong Kong and San Francisco.

Jael Weisman, an early member of the San Francisco Mime Troupe and Dell Arte Player's company directed the majority of Aoki's works. Her first play, Obake, came directly out of her Nohgaku training and was based on Japanese ghost stories In Noh, the dead are more important than the living. She believed that the actions of the dead bring us to the present and knowing the past allows us to change the future. Using her own life stories and observations growing up in a multicultural family, Aoki premiered The Queen's Garden, in 1992.

Aoki and Izu created Mermaid following the birth of their son, Kai Kane. Research led her to the conclusion that all cultures have legends of mermaids because all humans begin as mermaids swimming in their mother's womb. This work was based on the Japanese proverb "eat the flesh of a mermaid and you'll live forever." Mermaid was commissioned in 1997 by Maestro Kent Nagano and the Berkeley Symphony. It is a blend of Western theatricality with Japanese Noh and Kyogen drama backed by combinations of Eastern and Western musical instruments. In 2023, Aoki debuted a new multi-media piece about the city of San Francisco, directed by David Furumoto and developed during the COVID-19 pandemic.

== Recognition ==
Aoki's plays and solo performances have received critical acclaim and recognition including Drama-Logue Awards and Critic's Circle Awards. Her recordings have received INDIE Awards for Best Spoken Word (1990 & 1999). and she has been recognized with awards from the National Endowment for the Arts, the American Society for Composers, Authors and Publishers, the Asian American Arts Foundation, and the U.S. Pan Asian Chamber of Commerce.

Aoki's monodramas have been commissioned by the National Endowment for the Arts, Japan Foundation, Asian Cultural Council, U.S. Congress, State of California and the City of San Francisco. She was selected by the Smithsonian to perform before the 1996 National Asian American Congressional Caucus.

== Selected works ==
=== Plays ===
- Tales of the Pacific Rim (1990)
- Obake! Tales of Spirits of Past and Present (1991)
- The Queen's Garden (1992)
- Random Acts of Kindness (1994)
- Mermaid (1997)
- Ballad of Bones (2000)
- Kuan-Yin: Our Lady of Compassion (2002)
- Uncle Gunjiro's Girlfriend (2007)
- The Legend of Morning Glory (2008)
- Soul of the City (2023)

=== Discography ===
- 2009 Legend of Morning Glory, as CD and as digital download on IODA: the Independent On-Line Distribution Alliance
- 2008 Mermaid Meat: the secret to immorality book with C.D. Belly to Belly
- 2008 The Queen's Garden, C.D. new release Belly to Belly
- 1999 The Queen's Garden, C.D. Asian Improv Records
- 1997 Black Hair: Some Japanese Ghosts, audio-cassette Pele Productions
- 1990 Dreams & Illusions: Tales of the Pacific Rim, C.D. Rounder Records

=== Publications ===
- No Way Out (1984)
- Layin’ It on the Line (1985)
- No Way Out (1984)
- Living on Tokyo Time (1987)
- Tales of the Pacific Rim (1990)
- Black Hair (1998)
- The Queen's Garden (1999)
