= Beyond the Rain =

Studio album by Chico Freeman
- Released: 1978
- Recorded: June 21–23, 1977
- Studio: Contemporary's, Los Angeles, California
- Genre: Jazz
- Length: 41:10
- Label: Contemporary; S 7640
- Producer: John Koenig and Lester Koenig

Chico Freeman chronology
No Time Left (1977)	Beyond the Rain (1978)	Kings of Mali (1977)

Beyond the Rain is an album by American jazz saxophonist Chico Freeman, recorded in 1977 and released on the Contemporary label.

== Reception ==
Professional ratings
Review scores
Source	Rating
AllMusic	4.5/5 stars
DownBeat	4/5 stars
The Penguin Guide to Jazz Recordings	3/4 stars
The Rolling Stone Jazz Record Guide	4/5 stars

The Bay State Banner wrote that "Freeman is quietly impressive—a smooth, fluid, inventive and growing improviser."

AllMusic awarded the album 4½ stars, with Scott Yanow calling it "one of tenor saxophonist Chico Freeman's best early efforts... Fine music from the flexible tenor man".

== Track listing ==
All compositions by Chico Freeman except as indicated

1. "Two Over One" (Muhal Richard Abrams) - 7:40
2. "Beyond the Rain" - 3:30
3. "Excerpts" (Abrams) - 7:20
4. "My One and Only Love" (Guy Wood, Robert Mellin) - 7:50
5. "Pepe's Samba" - 14:50

== Personnel ==
- Chico Freeman – tenor saxophone, flute
- Hilton Ruiz – piano
- Joony Booth – bass
- Elvin Jones – drums
- Jumma Santos – percussion
