= Song for the Old World =

Studio album by Anthony Davis Quartet
- Released: 1978
- Recorded: July 1978
- Genre: Jazz
- Length: 42:36
- Label: India Navigation; IN 1036
- Producer: India Navigation Co.

Anthony Davis chronology
Of Blues and Dreams (1978)	Song for the Old World (1978)	Hidden Voices (1979)

Song for the Old World is an album by pianist and composer Anthony Davis recorded in 1978 for the India Navigation label.

== Reception ==
Professional ratings
Review scores
Source	Rating
Allmusic	4/5 stars

Allmusic awarded the album 4 stars, stating: "In addition to a feature for Hoggard and tributes to the bebop generation and Andrew Hill, the most impressive piece is the title cut which has fragments of melodies from Africa and Asia. This subtle album rewards repeated listenings".

== Track listing ==
All compositions by Anthony Davis except as indicated

1. "Behind the Rock" - 4:20
2. "Song for the Old World" - 12:30
3. "African Ballad" - 5:30
4. "59" (Mark Helias) - 7:51
5. "An Anthem for the Generation That Died" - 7:27
6. "Andrew" - 4:58

== Personnel ==
- Anthony Davis - piano
- Jay Hoggard - vibraphone
- Mark Helias - bass
- Ed Blackwell - drums, cajón
