= Flute Talk =

Studio album by Buddy Collette Quintet featuring James Newton
- Released: 1989
- Recorded: July 4–5, 1988
- Studio: Barigozzi Studio, Milano, Italy
- Genre: Jazz
- Length: 46:42
- Label: Soul Note; SN 1165
- Producer: Giovanni Bonandrini

Buddy Collette chronology
Block Buster (1973)	Flute Talk (1989)	Jazz for Thousand Oaks (1996)

James Newton chronology
In Venice (1987)	Trio² (1989)

Flute Talk is an album by Buddy Collette's Quintet featuring James Newton recorded in 1988 in Italy and released on the Soul Note label.

== Reception ==
Professional ratings
Review scores
Source	Rating
AllMusic	4.5/5 stars
The Penguin Guide to Jazz Recordings	4/4 stars

The AllMusic review by Scott Yanow noted " Although the music is primarily straight-ahead, there are some adventurous moments".

== Track listing ==
All compositions by Buddy Collette except where noted.

1. "Magali" - 5:59
2. "Blues in Torrance" - 6:31
3. "Richmond in Acropolis" (James Newton) - 7:22
4. "It's You" - 5:25
5. "Crystal" - 5:06
6. "Andr" - 5:54
7. "Flute Talk" (Collette, Newton) - 4:31
8. "Roshanda" - 5:54

== Personnel ==
- Buddy Collette - alto saxophone, flute, clarinet
- James Newton - flute
- Geri Allen - piano
- Jaribu Shahid - bass
- Giampiero Prina - drums
