= Mark Izu =

American jazz musician (1954–2025)

Mark Izu (September 30, 1954 – January 12, 2025) was an American jazz double bass player and composer. He was of sansei (third-generation) Japanese ancestry and frequently combined jazz with Asian traditional musics (particularly the ancient Japanese court music known as gagaku) in his compositions. He performed with Anthony Brown and Jon Jang. Izu was a seminal leader in the Asian American jazz movement. His compositions include works for symphony orchestra, film, theater, dance, and jazz. The principal curator of the original Asian American Jazz Festival held at the Asian Art Museum in San Francisco’s Golden Gate Park for nearly two decades, he helped establish the genre. In addition to the double bass, he also played the Japanese shō and Chinese sheng (both free-reed mouth organs).

== Life and career ==
Izu was born in Vallejo, California, on September 30, 1954. He grew up in Seattle, Washington and Sunnyvale, California. The second of three brothers, he studied music at San Francisco State University. He lived in San Francisco, California, with his wife, playwright and performer Brenda Wong Aoki, and son (Kai Kāne Aoki Izu).

Mark Izu received a Northern California Regional Emmy Award for outstanding Musical Composition/Arrangement for his score for Bolinao 52, a film about the Vietnamese boat people, which also received an Emmy Award for Outstanding Documentary.

Izu died of colon cancer in San Francisco, on January 12, 2025, at the age of 70.

== Discography ==
=== As leader ===
- Circle of Fire, Mark Izu & Circle of Fire (1992)
- Last Dance (2002)
- Threading Time (2007)
- Mermaid Meat (2007)
- Dragon Painter (2007)
- Navarasa: Duets for Shakuhachi & Contrabass (2010)
- Legend of Morning Glory (2010)

=== As sideman ===
- Cat Chat, Tokyo Broadcast System (1999) TBS CD ROM
- Duke Ellington’s Far East Suite, Asian American Orchestra (1999)
- The Queen’s Garden, Brenda Wong Aoki (1998)
- Dreams & Illusions: Tales of the Pacific Rim, with Brenda Aoki
- San Francisco Jazz Festival 96
- Tiananmen, Jon Jang & The Pan Asian Arkestra Soul Note
- Quest, Michael West
- Live in Berlin, United Front
- What Is the Difference Between Stripping and Playing the Violin? with Miya Masaoka
- Family, Anthony Brown
- Big Bands Behind Bared Wire, Asian American Jazz Orchestra (1998)
- Jang, Jon Jang
- Song for Manong, Fred Houn
- Never Give Up, Jon Jang & The Pan Asian Arkestra
- Self Defense!, Jon Jang & The Pan Asian Arkestra Soul Note
- Francis Wong, Francis Wong & the Great Wall Ensemble
- Crystalization of the Mind, Jason Michaels
- In Xinjiang Time, Phoenix Spring Ensemble, Betty Wong OWR
- Travel of a Zen Baptist, Mark Izu/Lewis Jordan
- Are You Chinese or Charlie Chan?, Jon Jang
- Ohm: Unit of Resistance, United Front
- Of Blues Myself & I, Ray Collins
- Path with a Heart, United Front
- Monk, Anthony Brown's Asian American Orchestra
- Russel Hisashi Baba, Russel Baba

== See also ==
- Asian American jazz
