= The Outside Within =

Studio album by Chico Freeman
- Released: 1981
- Recorded: 1978
- Genre: Jazz
- Length: 41:53
- Label: India Navigation; IN 1042
- Producer: Bob Cummins

Chico Freeman chronology
Kings of Mali (1977)	The Outside Within (1981)	Spirit Sensitive (1978)

The Outside Within is an album by American jazz saxophonist Chico Freeman, recorded in 1978 and released on the India Navigation label.

== Reception ==
The AllMusic review by Scott Yanow stated: "The music is often influenced by the scales of the Far East, yet also has the warmth and extroverted emotions of the west. All of the musicians have opportunities to make strong contributions, and the top-notch players (some of the finest) are heard throughout in top form".

Professional ratings
Review scores
Source	Rating
AllMusic	4.5/5 stars
The Rolling Stone Jazz Record Guide	4/5 stars

== Track listing ==
All compositions by Chico Freeman except as indicated

1. "The Search" - 7:00
2. "Undercurrent" (Cecil McBee) - 19:38
3. "Luna" - 7:34
4. "Ascent" - 7:41

== Personnel ==
- Chico Freeman - tenor saxophone, bass clarinet
- John Hicks - piano
- Cecil McBee - bass
- Jack DeJohnette - drums
