= 2×4 (Malachi Favors Maghostut and Tatsu Aoki album) =

Studio album by Malachi Favors Maghostut and Tatsu Aoki
- Released: 1999
- Recorded: August 1998
- Studio: Sparrow Sound Design, Chicago, Illinois
- Genre: Free jazz
- Label: Southport Records; S-SSD0058
- Producer: Tatsu Aoki

2×4 is an album by double bassists Malachi Favors Maghostut and Tatsu Aoki. It was recorded in August 1998 at Sparrow Sound Design in Chicago, Illinois, and was released on CD in 1999 by Southport Records.

== Reception ==
Professional ratings
Review scores
| Source | Rating |
|---|---|
| AllMusic | 4/5 stars |
| The Penguin Guide to Jazz | 3/4 stars |
| All About Jazz | 4/5 stars |

In a review for AllMusic, Michael G. Nastos described the album as "incredible music," and wrote: "Though these bassists are quite different in approach and concept, they work well in bringing their adept musicianship to the surface, coming together on many natural and spiritual levels... If you like improvised music with no boundaries and the sonic possibilities the upright bass can conjure, this is going to please you."

The authors of The Penguin Guide to Jazz Recordings stated: "The dark, Wilbur Ware-influenced sound is unexpectedly familiar here, highlighted by Aoki's vivid work with the bow."

Writing for All About Jazz, Glenn Astarita commented: "2 x 4 represents a series of compositions and improvisations yet portrays the bass as a source of spiritual empowerment or in the mythical sense, a healing force of sorts... 2 x 4 is surprisingly musical and not quite as austere or rigid as one might expect... The synergy makes for a soulful experience via an absorbing yet fascinating series of duets from two pros who share similar visions and aspirations."

In a review for Jazz Times, John Murph remarked: "the pairing of these two bassists and sonic explorers certainly amounts to a wellspring of possibilities. What could have resulted in a cacophony of nonsense or exclusive navel-gazing becomes an enchanting summit meeting that forgoes conventional song structure, and thereby delivers a Zen-like collection of conversation that varies in tone and texture... A highly recommended listening."

== Track listing ==
All compositions by Malachi Favors Maghostut and Tatsu Aoki except as indicated.

1. "Introduction" – 6:18
2. "Chop Stick Blues" – 6:17
3. "The Keeper" – 9:23
4. "Call of the Dogon" – 7:11
5. "On-Do, Ondo" – 8:04
6. "Raindance" (Tatsu Aoki) – 4:33
7. "Elephant Walk" – 3:35
8. "Reunion" – 3:53
9. "A Long Time Ago" (Malachi Favors Maghostu) – 5:09

== Personnel ==
- Malachi Favors Maghostut – double bass
- Tatsu Aoki – double bass
