= Under the Double Moon =

Studio album by Anthony Davis and Jay Hoggard
- Released: 1981
- Recorded: September 1 & 2, 1980
- Studio: MPS Studio in Villingen, West Germany
- Genre: Jazz
- Label: MPS; MPS 15562
- Producer: Joachim E. Berendt

Anthony Davis chronology
Lady of the Mirrors (1980)	Under the Double Moon (1981)	Epistēmē (1981)

Jay Hoggard chronology
Days Like These (1979)	Under the Double Moon (1981)	Rain Forest (1981)

Under the Double Moon is an album by pianist and composer Anthony Davis and vibraphonist Jay Hoggard recorded in West Germany in 1980 for the MPS label.

== Reception ==
Professional ratings
Review scores
Source	Rating
Allmusic	3/5 stars

Allmusic awarded the album 3 stars, stating: "This is an interesting set of duets by pianist Anthony Davis and vibraphonist Jay Hoggard. With the exception of Duke Ellington's advanced "The Clothed Woman," the duo sticks to originals, some of which are quite complex. However, the mellow sound of their instruments make the improvisations seem more accessible than they really are".

== Track listing ==
All compositions by Anthony Davis except as indicated

1. "A Walk Through the Shadow (Based on Psalm 23)" - 5:56
2. "Ujamaa: Spirit of the Ancestors/Perseverance/Uhuru Ni Kazi" (Jay Hogggard) - 9:04
3. "FMW ("For My Wife")" - 6:37
4. "The Clothed Woman" (Duke Ellington) - 5:13
5. "Under the Double Moon: Wayang No. 4" - 11:08
6. "Toe Dance for a Baby" (Hoggard) - 6:03

== Personnel ==
- Anthony Davis - Bösendorfer Imperial Grand Piano
- Jay Hoggard - vibraphone
