= Kings of Mali =

Kings Of Mali

Live album by Chico Freeman
- Released: 1978
- Recorded: September 1977
- Genre: Jazz
- Length: 40:21
- Label: India Navigation
- Producer: India Navigation

Chico Freeman chronology
Beyond the Rain (1977)	Kings Of Mali (1978)	The Outside Within (1978)

Professional ratings
Review scores
Source	Rating
Allmusic	4/5 stars
The Rolling Stone Jazz Record Guide	5/5 stars

Kings Of Mali is a post-bop/avant-garde jazz LP by Chico Freeman on India Navigation Records IN 1035 in September 1977 and released in 1978.

The lp, like many others recorded and produced by India Navigation in New York city, featured many of the top American players in post-bop and avant-garde jazz and features songs inspired by African history and the legacy of African Americans.

== Criticism ==
Jazz critic Scott Yanow wrote: “(Freeman) stretches out on four of his colourful originals, which are dedicated to the ancient kingdom of Mali."

== Background ==
Inspired by the history of the Empire of Mali, Chico Freeman printed an extensive section of research from “Sundiata Keita and Mansa Kankan Musa, Kings of Mali” on the back of the album jacket.

== Track listing ==
1. "Look Up" (Freeman) – 11:28
2. "Minstrels’ Sun Dance" (Freeman)– 7:53
3. "Kings Of Mali" (Freeman) – 9:56
4. "Illas (pronounced “Eejas”)" (Freeman) – 11:04

=== CD Reissue ===
To date, there has been no CD issued of this recording.

== Personnel ==
- Chico Freeman - tenor saxophone, soprano saxophone, flute, alto flute, bailophone
- Jay Hoggard – vibraphone, bailophone,
- Cecil McBee – bass
- Anthony Davis – piano
- Famoudou Don Moye - drums, percussion, bailophone, gongs, whistles

== Production ==
- India Navigation
- Cover photo: Beth Cummins
