= Kularts, Inc. =

Kularts (Kulintang Arts Inc.) is a San Francisco, California, based non-profit organization founded in 1985. It presents contemporary and tribal Filipino arts. Its mission is to expand the understanding of American Filipino culture, by sponsoring productions and presentations in the United States. Through its programs of performances, visual arts, community dialogues, and festivals, the organization hopes to advance the spirit and integrity of ancestral Filipino art and cultures.

== History ==
In 1985, musician Robert L. Henry, dancer Marcella Pabros, and choreographer/director Alleluia Panis founded Kulintang Arts, Inc., now known as Kularts. They chose "kulintang" in honor of the ancient music tradition of Mindanao, Philippines. Its first office and rehearsal space was in the South of Market Cultural Center in San Francisco.

Kulintang Arts's primary program was the work of Kulintang Arts Ensemble (KAE), a ten-member music and dance ensemble which presented contemporary work rooted in the indigenous Filipino traditions. Danongan Kalanduyan, a musician from the Southern Philippines, was KAE's resident artist and kulintang music director/instructor (1985–88). KAE members included Musiban Guiabar, Frank Holder, Joey Maliga, Dana Nuñez, Anna Sun Foo, Frances Cachapero, Ric Serrano, Joshua Francisco, Daniel Giray, Sharon Sato, Jesse Bie, among others. Panis choreographed full-evening works: Ancient Rhythms/Urban Sounds (1988); Lm' Ehek: at the heART of the sharpenINg stONE (1989); Cycles: Timeless Rituals to Ancient Icons (1990); and Diwata (1993).

KAE performed at the San Francisco Ethnic Dance Festival from 1985 to 1990 and toured nationally and internationally; including the Dance Theater Workshop, New York; Lincoln Center, New York City; the Kennedy Center; the Bumbershoot Festival, Seattle; the Verona Jazz Festival, Italy; the Baguio Arts Festival, the Philippines; and the Asian Arts Festival, Singapore. KAE Music recordings include Fred Ho's 1988 album A Song For Manong, originally released by Asian Improv. Recordings released by Kulintang Arts Inc. include Ancient Rhythms/Urban Sounds; Kulintang Arts Live! In Concert with Jon Jang; and Cycles: Timeless Rituals to Ancient Icons.

By early 1992, serious stresses were beginning to affect the performing ensemble. The artists were suffering from burnout as a result of the grueling pace of creating, performing, and touring new works year after year. These stresses forced the leadership to reexamine the mix of Kulintang Arts's program activities, which, up until that time, focused on the KAE dance and music works. Kulintang Arts shifted it activities to presentations and project commissions.

After 10 years of performances, creation of major works, national and international tours, KAE officially disbanded in 1995 and the organization Kulintang Arts Inc. took a different route, to become an organization for the commissioning and presentation of works by American Filipino and Philippine-based artists. Through this organizational restructuring, Kularts has developed emerging and established artists. Kulintang Arts Inc. took on the name Kularts to reflect the expansion of its program activities.

Kularts is currently directed by Alleluia Panis at Bayanihan Community Center in San Francisco's SoMa Pilipinas.

== Programming ==
=== Kularts Presents ===
Presentations of commissioned works of Filipino-American and international artists to showcase contemporary and tribal Filipino performing arts.

=== Partial list of commissioned works ===
- Philippine dance master Jay Loyola: Huni Ng Tandikan - Pala'uan Bird Call (2011); Maség -Typhoon (2014); Ba-e Makiling, Diwata of the Mountain (2016).
- Composer Florante Aguilar: Aswang (2011); Maség - Typhoon (2014); Ba-e Makiling, Diwata of the Mountain (2016).
- Alleluia Panis: Diwata (1992); The Warrior Project with Giron Escrima Bahala Na and KontraGapi (2000); Heroes (2004); Mutya (2005); Ibig-Pulse of Desire (2009).

=== Partial list of notable presentations ===
The Post-Modern American Pilipino Performance Project (POMO) (1998–2009) was a curated annual concert of cutting edge works highlighting the experiences of the Filipino diaspora.

=== Partial list of artists presented ===
- Tongue in a Mood
- Jesse Bie
- Sean San Jose
- Dwayne Calizo
- Kennedy Kabasares
- Gigi Otalvaro-Hormilosa
- Somei Yashino Taiko
- Touchblue w/ Rene Gube
- Jaymar Cabebe
- Francis Lansang & Abraham Cajudo
- Rex Navarette
- Anthem Salgado
- 8th Wonder
- Krishtine De Leon
- Jimmy Biala
- Simeon Den
- Alison dela Cruz
- Lot 24
- Kulintronica
- Melinda Corazon Foley
- Allan Manalo
- Kevin Camia

=== Philippine Master Artist In Residency (PMAIR) ===
- Edru Abraham & Kontragapi (1999–2000)
- Sunnie Noel & Sining Kambayoka (2002)
- Helobong Cultural Troupe w/Maria Todi, Danilo Kasaw, & Rose Sula (2003)
- Magui Master Artists of Cotabato w/ Faisal Monal, Teng Mangansakan, Datuan Kalanduyan, Abraham Abdullah, Akmad Siao, Teng Emba (2005, 2006)
- Ifugao Music & Dance Ensemble of Banaue (2007)
- Bai Liza Saway, Talaandig culture bearer (2009)
- Datu Rodelio Waway Saway, Talaandig musician/visual artist (2011)
- Kidlat Tahimik, 'grandfather' of new Filipino cinema (2013)

=== Community engagement program ===
Kularts creates participatory arts events that provide connections to Filipino culture and history.

- Annual Parol Lantern Festival & Parade – a project of the Filipino American Development Foundation, Kularts has been its producing partner since 2008.
- Dialogue on Philippine Dance & Culture in the Diaspora (2016)
- Ma'artes Pinoy Arts Festival (2015)
- Philippine Tribal Tour (since 2002) – a biennial immersion tour of the Philippines' indigenous communities designed for U.S.-based artists and cultural workers. 12 days of hands-on activities and interaction with contemporary indigenous artists and culture bearers of Maguindanao, Tiboli, Maranao, and Talaandig people in Mindanao, Philippines.
- Tribung Kawayan Summer Program Grades 1-8 (2008–2010) – Fides Enriquez (dance), Lisa Juachon (eco arts), Toni Sideco (voice).
- Young Soma Voices (2010) – with artists RJ Lozada (media), Dianne Que (design), and Patty Cachapero (creative writing).
- Sons: Young Pilipino Men Speak (2005) – with master writers Jaime Jacinto and Joel Barraquiel Tan.

=== Visual arts program ===
Kularts began the visual arts program in 2009. Its first project, which was created through a community effort led by James "Ganyan" Garcia and Christopher de Leon, was at the Filipino Community Center in the Excelsior district.

==== Visual arts commissioned projects ====
- Untitled (2009) 3 x 5 ft mural by James "Ganyan" Garcia and Christopher de Leon
- Filipino Community Center, San Francisco (SF), California (CA)
- Tuloy Po Kayo (2011) 20 x 80 ft mural by Cece Carpio & Trust Your Struggle
- Bessie Carmichael Middle School, SF, CA
- Bayanihan (2012) mural by Cece Carpio
- Bayanihan Community Center, SF, CA
- Kodakan: Filipinos in the City (2013) photo and media exhibition – in partnership with the SF Main Library and the SF chapter of the Filipino American National Historical Society, by art director Wilfred Galila, with Peggy Peralta and Cece Carpio – Changing expressions of Filipino cultural identity by using a series of photographs and video images – both in posed and casual settings – contrasting between the then and now, exhibited at the SF Main Library, I-Hotel.
- Manilatown Center, ACT Strand Theater, and Bayanihan Center
- Galleon, Art Installation (2013) by Kidlat Tahimik, Luggage Gallery
- Make Your Own Revolution (2012, 2013) chalk art by Paolo Salazar
- Kwentohan, Splendor of Wound (2015) comic book by Trinidad Escobar
- Clan of Saints Bay (2016) comic book & poster art by Don Aguillo and Rafael Salazar

=== Additional details of recent notable works/programming by Kularts ===
==== Maség: Typhoon ====
Set in pre-colonial 1400's, Maség takes place on Pulo, a fictitious typhoon-battered island in Palawan, Philippines where a once powerful tribal shaman has been banished with his daughter. In plotting his revenge, he manipulates and enslaves spirit deities into conjuring powerful typhoons to sink his enemy's ships off the island. Once shipwrecked, his enemies are separated throughout the island. The chieftain then places a spell on his daughter to seduce his enemy's son.

This piece was created in 2014 by choreographer Jay Loyola and creative director/producer Alleluia Panis. Maség is a reinterpretation of Shakespeare's The Tempest. Music was provided by Florante Aguilar, who played each of 17 instruments: guitar, kulintang, sarunai, hegelung, kagul, bungkaka, kubing, sludoy, bamboo flute, gambal, cajon, taiko, celesta, African shakers, Brazilian drums, and Logic Pro. Maség: Typhoon premiered at the Brava Theater in San Francisco on November 15 and 16, 2014, and returned for an outdoor showing at the Yerba Buena Gardens in San Francisco on May 23, 2015, as part of the 1st Annual Ma'ARTES Festival and the 15th Annual Yerba Buena Gardens Festival.

==== Tribal tour ====
Since 2002, Kularts has provided a tribal tour, giving participants opportunities to explore and discover indigenous Filipino cultures of Mindanao. During the 12-day trip, participants engage in interactions with T'boli, B'laan, Maguindanaoan, and Manobo tribal leaders, shamans, healers, and master artists in their ancestral homes. This trip takes participants to Davao del Sur, Saranggani, South Cotabato, and in the Manguindanao provinces. This experience allows for hands-on experience in the following subjects:

- myths and ancient ways of knowing from the Southern Philippines
- traditional rituals led by tribal shamans and ritualists
- sacred and secular dances
- craft-making through natural dyes, "dream weaving" of the t'nalak fabric, and "lost wax" gong-making techniques
- a sampling of various Mindanaoan cuisines throughout the Southern Philippines

==== She, Who Can See ====
She, Who Can See tells the story of a 4th-generation Filipina American whose family comes from a shamanic past and her struggles as she deals with her extraordinary abilities. Ancestral deities begin to appear in her dreams and throughout her life, turning her world upside down as she tries to live the life of a normal working-class Filipina woman.

Alleluia Panis created this piece in 2015; it premiered at Bindlestiff Studios in the South of Market district of San Francisco as part of the inaugural Ma'ARTES Festival. Florante Aguilar composed the musical score for the piece, using traditional Philippine instruments and other instruments found across the globe. June Arellano created the costumes, combining cultural outfits into a modern interpretation of the Pilipino experience. Wilfred Galila served as the videographer.

==== Ma'ARTES Festival ====
In May 2015, Kularts, in partnership with the Filipino American Development Foundation and the API Cultural Center, created the Ma'ARTES Festival to promote Filipino artists throughout the Bay Area. The festival was inspired by the traditional festivals of the Philippines which celebrated the first of the monsoon rains – a symbol of life and promise of the future. The festival hosted various forms of art, to celebrate and honor Filipino creativity, throughout the month of May. Events were hosted at five historically Filipino-American spaces: International Hotel's Manilatown Center; Bindlestiff Studio; Bayanihan Center; Yerba Buena Garden; and Gene Friend Rec & Park.
