= Lady of the Mirrors =

Studio album by Anthony Davis
- Released: 1980
- Recorded: 1980
- Genre: Jazz
- Length: 46:38
- Label: India Navigation; IN 1047
- Producer: India Navigation Co.

Anthony Davis chronology
Hidden Voices (1979)	Lady of the Mirrors (1980)	Under the Double Moon (1981)

Lady of the Mirrors is a solo album by pianist and composer Anthony Davis recorded in 1980 for the India Navigation label.

== Reception ==
Professional ratings
Review scores
Source	Rating
Allmusic	4/5 stars

In The Boston Phoenix, critic Bob Blumenthal wrote that Davis performs "with an elegance that has only been hinted at in the past." Allmusic awarded the album 4 stars, stating: "in general the complex and often-fascinating music is quite original and has no obvious predecessor. Lady of the Mirrors is still one of Anthony Davis' finest piano recordings".

== Track listing ==
All compositions by Anthony Davis

1. "Beyond Reason" - 6:25
2. "Lady of the Mirrors" - 5:05
3. "Five Moods from an English Garden" - 9:40
4. "Under the Double Moon" - 12:15
5. "Man on a Turquoise Cloud" - 6:15
6. "Whose Life?" - 6:58 Bonus track on CD reissue

== Personnel ==
- Anthony Davis - piano
