= Destiny's Dance =

Studio album by Chico Freeman
- Released: 1982
- Recorded: October 29 & 30, 1981
- Studio: Ocean Way, Hollywood, California
- Genre: Jazz
- Length: 36:12
- Label: Contemporary; C 14008
- Producer: Chico Freeman, John Koenig

Chico Freeman chronology
Peaceful Heart, Gentle Spirit (1980)	Destiny's Dance (1982)	Tradition in Transition (1982)

Destiny's Dance is an album by American jazz saxophonist Chico Freeman, recorded in 1981 and released on the Contemporary label.

== Reception ==
Professional ratings
Review scores
Source	Rating
AllMusic	4/5 stars
The Penguin Guide to Jazz Recordings	4/4 stars
The Rolling Stone Jazz Record Guide	4/5 stars

The AllMusic review by Scott Yanow stated: "By 1981, after six years of steady recording, Chico Freeman had gained a strong reputation as a flexible reed player able to play both avant-garde and fairly straight-ahead jazz". The Penguin Guide to Jazz numbers it among the "core collection" which jazz fans should possess.

== Track listing ==
All compositions by Chico Freeman except as indicated

1. "Destiny's Dance" - 4:11
2. "Same Shame" (Bobby Hutcherson) - 5:37
3. "Crossing the Sudan" - 5:46
4. "Wilpan's Walk" (Cecil McBee) - 9:18
5. "Embracing Oneness" - 6:59
6. "C & M" (Muhal Richard Abrams, Freeman) - 4:21

== Personnel ==
- Chico Freeman - tenor saxophone, bass clarinet
- Wynton Marsalis - trumpet (tracks 1, 3, 4 & 6)
- Bobby Hutcherson - vibraphone
- Dennis Moorman - piano (tracks 1, 4 & 6)
- Cecil McBee - bass
- Ronnie Burrage - drums
- Paulinho Da Costa - percussion (track 4)
