= Peaceful Heart, Gentle Spirit =

Studio album by Chico Freeman
- Released: 1980
- Recorded: March 6 & 7, 1980
- Studio: Ocean Way, Los Angeles, California
- Genre: Jazz
- Length: 40:22
- Label: Contemporary; C 14005
- Producer: John Koenig

Chico Freeman chronology
No Time Left (1979)	Peaceful Heart, Gentle Spirit (1980)	Destiny's Dance (1981)

Peaceful Heart, Gentle Spirit is an album by American jazz saxophonist Chico Freeman, recorded in 1980 and released on the Contemporary label.

== Reception ==
The AllMusic review by Scott Yanow stated: "This music is stimulating and represents one of the highpoints of Freeman's rather streaky career." The Rolling Stone Jazz Record Guide said the album was "perhaps the best opportunity to sample Freeman's writing and instrumental arsenal."

Professional ratings
Review scores
Source	Rating
AllMusic	4.5/5 stars
The Rolling Stone Jazz Record Guide	5/5 stars

== Track listing ==
All compositions by Chico Freeman

1. "Peaceful Heart, Gentle Spirit" - 7:21
2. "Freedom Swing Song (Dedicated to Eric Dolphy)" - 7:20
3. "Look Up" - 7:05
4. "Nia's Song Dance" - 8:50
5. "Morning Prayer" - 9:46

== Personnel ==
- Chico Freeman - tenor saxophone, soprano saxophone, clarinet, bass clarinet, alto flute
- James Newton - flute, bass flute
- Jay Hoggard - vibraphone
- Kenny Kirkland - piano
- John Koenig - cello
- Buster Williams - bass
- Billy Hart - drums
- Paulinho da Costa, Efrain Toro - percussion
