= Hegelung =

Philippine wooden lute

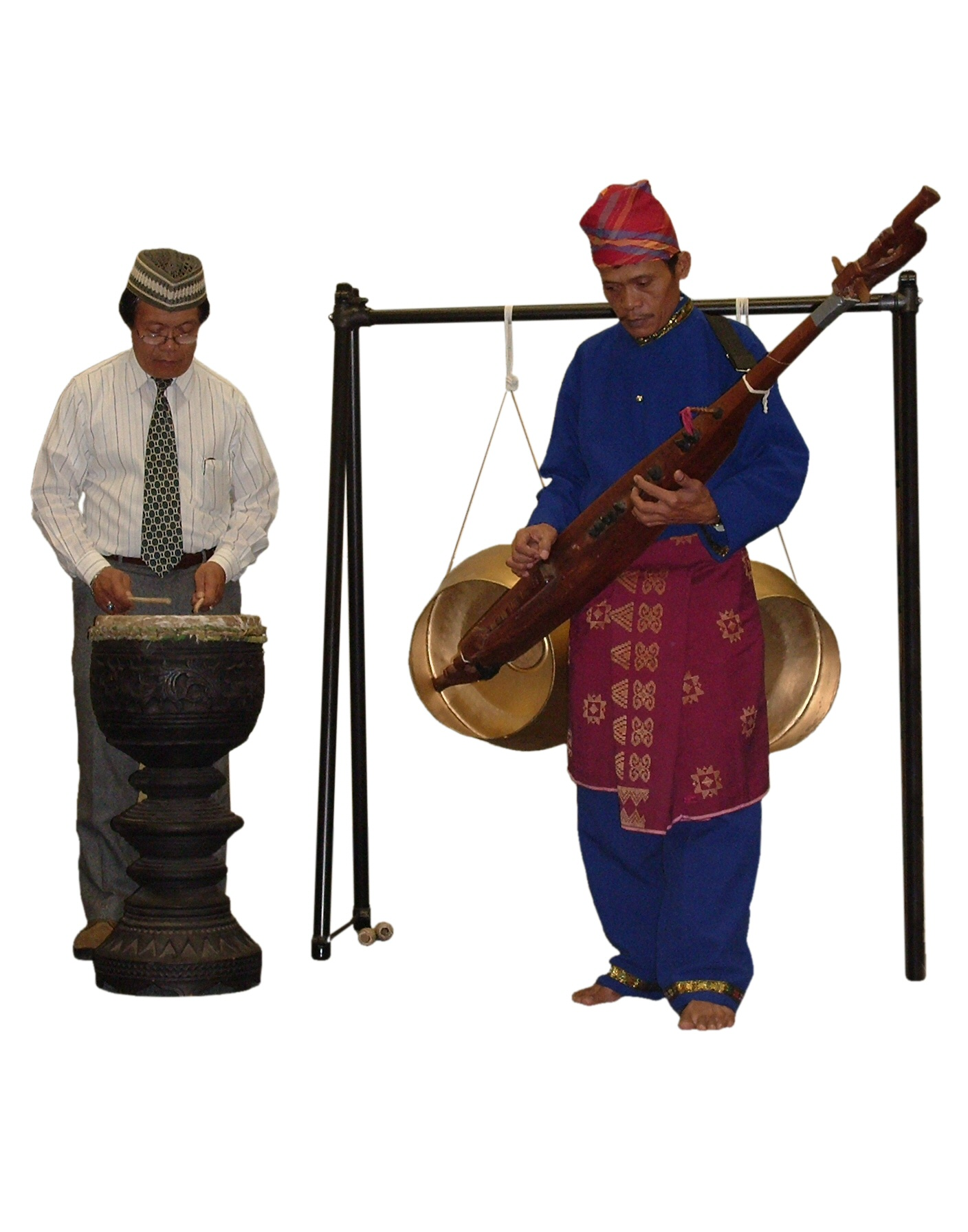
Hegelung

The hegelung is a wooden two-stringed lute played by the Tboli, an animist ethnolinguistic group of southern Mindanao in the Philippines.

The instrument is tall and slender, with nine frets. One string is used as a drone, and the other for melodic ornamentation. The performer playing the hegelung usually plays while dancing or with body movements and sometimes accompanies the instrument with singing.

Tboli believed that they could learn to play the hegelung if they rubbed their fingers with an insect called a meglung and the leaves of the meglung vine because the names rhymed. They thought that rhyming names could help them acquire the skill to play the instrument.

== See also ==
- Bandurria
- Kutiyapi
- Octavina
- Rondalla
