= Hidden Voices (album) =

Studio album by Anthony Davis/James Newton Quartet
- Released: 1979
- Recorded: 1979
- Genre: Jazz
- Length: 42:52
- Labels: India Navigation; IN 1041
- Producer: Bob Cummins

Anthony Davis chronology
Song for the Old World (1978)	Hidden Voices (1979)	Lady of the Mirrors (1980)

James Newton chronology
Paseo del Mar (1978)	Hidden Voices (1979)	The Mystery School (1980)

Hidden Voices is an album by the Anthony Davis/James Newton Quartet recorded in 1979 for the India Navigation label.

== Reception ==
Professional ratings
Review scores
Source	Rating
Allmusic	3/5 stars
DownBeat	4/5 stars

Allmusic awarded the album 3 stars, stating: "The music is quite unpredictable and free in spots, yet does not neglect the use of melody and space. Thought-provoking performances".

== Track listing ==
All compositions by Anthony Davis except as indicated

1. "Forever Charles" (James Newton) - 5:35
2. "Past Lives" - 9:10
3. "Hocket in the Pocket" - 5:12
4. "Crystal Texts Set I, Pre-A Reflection" (Newton) - 12:51
5. "Sudden Death" - 10:04

== Personnel ==
- Anthony Davis - piano
- James Newton - flute
- George Lewis - trombone
- Rick Rozie - bass
- Pheeroan akLaff - drums
