= Axum (album) =

Studio album by James Newton
- Released: 1982
- Recorded: August 1981
- Studio: Tonstudio Bauer; Ludwigsburg, W. Germany
- Genre: Jazz
- Length: 42:32
- Label: ECM; ECM 1214
- Producer: Manfred Eicher

James Newton chronology
The Mystery School (1979)	Axum (1982)	Portraits (1982)

Axum is a solo album by American jazz flautist and composer James Newton recorded in 1981 and released on ECM the following year.

== Reception ==
Professional ratings
Review scores
Source	Rating
AllMusic	3/5 stars
The Penguin Guide to Jazz Recordings	4/4 stars

Describing the album as “dazzling”, The Penguin Guide to Jazz Recordings says, “Newton’s vocalisations allow his pieces to develop with unprecedented depth, and his tone is quite remarkable.”

The AllMusic review by Scott Yanow awarded the album 3 stars stating "James Newton's set of unaccompanied flute solos is generally more intriguing and diverse than one might expect. An expert at multiphonics (often humming through his flute in order to get more than one note at a time), Newton is also very strong at constructing logical yet utterly unpredictable improvisations. His playing on nine of his originals covers a fair amount of ground, and he alternates between three different types of flutes (his regular horn, alto flute and bass flute). Still, the results are more for specialized tastes."

== Track listing ==
All tracks are written by James Newton.

Side I
No.	Title	Length
1.	"The Dabtara"	3:24
2.	"Malak 'Uqabe"	6:52
3.	"Solomon, Chief of Wise Men"	4:44
4.	"Addis Ababa"	2:56
5.	"Choir"	4:32

Side II
No.	Title	Length
1.	"Feeling"	2:34
2.	"Axum"	4:18
3.	"Susenyos and Werzelya"	5:20
4.	"The Neser"	7:59

== Personnel ==
- James Newton – flute, alto flute, bass flute
