= Spirit Sensitive =

Studio album by Chico Freeman
- Released: 1979
- Recorded: Oct 1978–Jan 1979
- Genre: Jazz
- Length: 36:58
- Label: India Navigation
- Producer: India Navigation

Chico Freeman chronology
The Outside Within (1978)	Spirit Sensitive (1979)	No Time Left (1979)

Spirit Sensitive is a jazz album by Chico Freeman, released in 1979 on India Navigation.

The LP, in contrast to many of his more avant-garde recordings of the same time frame, is a set that consists of jazz standards.

== Criticism ==
Professional ratings
Review scores
Source	Rating
AllMusic	4/5 stars
The Rolling Stone Jazz Record Guide	5/5 stars

The New York Times called Spirit Sensitive "a lyrical, utterly traditional album of ballads and jazz standards."

Jazz critic Scott Yanow called the album "a change of pace for Freeman, for it features the usually adventurous tenor (who doubles on soprano) mostly playing warm versions of standards.” The Rolling Stone Jazz Record Guide called it an "exquisite ballad album ... where Freeman blows standards with more invention and conviction than most old-timers."

== Track listing ==
1. "Autumn in New York" (Vernon Duke) – 11:28
2. "Peace" (Horace Silver)– 7:53
3. "A Child Is Born" (Thad Jones) – 9:56
4. "It Never Entered My Mind" (Rodgers and Hart) – 11:04
5. "Close to You Alone" – (Cecil McBee)
6. "Don't Get Around Much Anymore " – (Duke Ellington, Bob Russell)

Reissues

- An audio CD of the album was released on September 5, 1994, by Analogue Productions, with four bonus tracks, two of them written by John Coltrane (“Lonnie’s Lament” and “Wise One”) and a running time of 63:18. In 1994, there was also a U.S. limited edition audiophile 6-track LP pressed on HQ-180 super vinyl.

== Personnel ==
- Chico Freeman – tenor saxophone, soprano saxophone
- Cecil McBee – bass
- John Hicks – piano
- Billy Hart – drums
- Famoudou Don Moye – drums

Production

- India Navigation
- Cover and liner photos: Beth Cummins
