= Joel Brandon =

American composer

Joel A. Brandon (1947 – July 15, 2003) was an American composer, flautist, and whistler.

== Early life ==
Joel A. Brandon was born in 1947 and was raised in South Side, Illinois, a neighborhood in Chicago. He learned how to whistle as a boy at age seven, by blowing the air in rather than blowing the air out. He focused on whistling the same notes to make it sound better. At Dunbar High School, he learned the flute after doing well on a musical aptitude test. After high school, Brandon has worked many odd jobs, including being a chef, telephone installer, postal clerk, and jeweler.

== Career ==
Brandon attended the American Conservatory of Music in Chicago. As a whistler, Brandon has whistled for The Tonight Show with Johnny Carson and Good Morning America. He also whistled at the San Francisco Giants Stadium for the national anthem. His whistling and flautist talent had him do both for many different artists, including Tatsu Aoki, Famoudou Don Moye, Muhal Richard Abrams, and Leroy Hutson, among many others.

== Personal life and death ==
Outside of music, Brandon was also a painter, teacher, and sculptor. He died in Stroger Hospital in Chicago, Illinois on July 15, 2003.
