= No Time Left =

Studio album by Chico Freeman
- Released: 1979
- Recorded: June 8 & 9, 1979
- Genre: Jazz
- Length: 35:29
- Label: Black Saint
- Producer: Giacomo Pellicciotti

Chico Freeman chronology
Spirit Sensitive (1979)	No Time Left (1979)	Peaceful Heart, Gentle Spirit (1980)

No Time Left is an album by American jazz saxophonist Chico Freeman, recorded in 1979 for the Italian Black Saint label.

== Reception ==
The AllMusic review by Scott Yanow stated: "Freeman's warm tone and knowledge of more traditional areas of jazz make even his more abstract flights seem fairly accessible".

Professional ratings
Review scores
Source	Rating
AllMusic	3/5 stars
The Penguin Guide to Jazz Recordings	3.5/4 stars
The Rolling Stone Jazz Record Guide	3/5 stars

== Track listing ==
All compositions by Chico Freeman

1. "No Time Left" - 17:49
2. "Uhmla" - 12:26
3. "Circle" - 5:14

== Production ==
Recorded at Fontana Studios in Milano, Italy on June 8 & 9, 1979

== Personnel ==
- Chico Freeman - tenor saxophone, soprano saxophone, bass clarinet
- Jay Hoggard - vibes
- Rick Rozie - bass
- Famoudou Don Moye - drums
