= Chico Freeman =

American jazz saxophonist and trumpeter

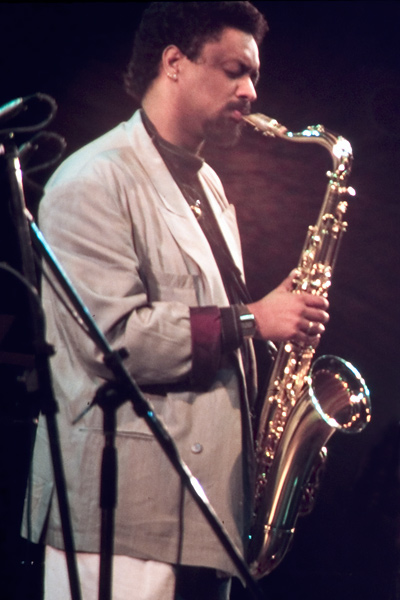
- Chico Freeman in 1989, at the North Sea Jazz Festival with The Leaders

Background information
- Born: July 17, 1949 (age 77); Chicago, Illinois, U.S.
- Genre: Jazz
- Instruments: Tenor saxophone, bass clarinet

Chico Freeman (born Earl Lavon Freeman Jr.; July 17, 1949) is a modern jazz tenor saxophonist and trumpeter and son of jazz saxophonist Von Freeman. He began recording as lead musician in 1976 with Morning Prayer, won the New York Jazz Award in 1979 and earned the Stereo Review Record of the Year in 1981 for his album The Outside Within.

== Early years ==
He was born in Chicago, Illinois, the son of jazz tenor saxophonist Von Freeman. His uncle George Freeman played the guitar, and his uncle Bruz Freeman played the drums. Freeman took piano lessons as a child and was introduced to the trumpet by his brother Everett, who found a trumpet in the family basement. Freeman began playing, inspired by artists such as Miles Davis and his Kind of Blue album. He went to Northwestern University in 1967 with a scholarship for mathematics and played the trumpet in the school, but did not begin playing the saxophone until his junior year. After practicing eight to ten hours per day and trying out for the saxophone section, Freeman quickly changed his major to music, and graduated in 1972. By that time he was proficient in saxophone, trumpet, and piano.

After graduation, Freeman taught at the Association for the Advancement of Creative Musicians School of Music in Chicago, and started taking classes as a graduate student at Governors State University, earning a master's degree in composition and theory. Although most of Freeman's musical upbringing had been in jazz, at this time he began getting involved in blues music as well. He began playing at local Chicago clubs with artists such as Memphis Slim and Lucky Carmichael.

== Career ==
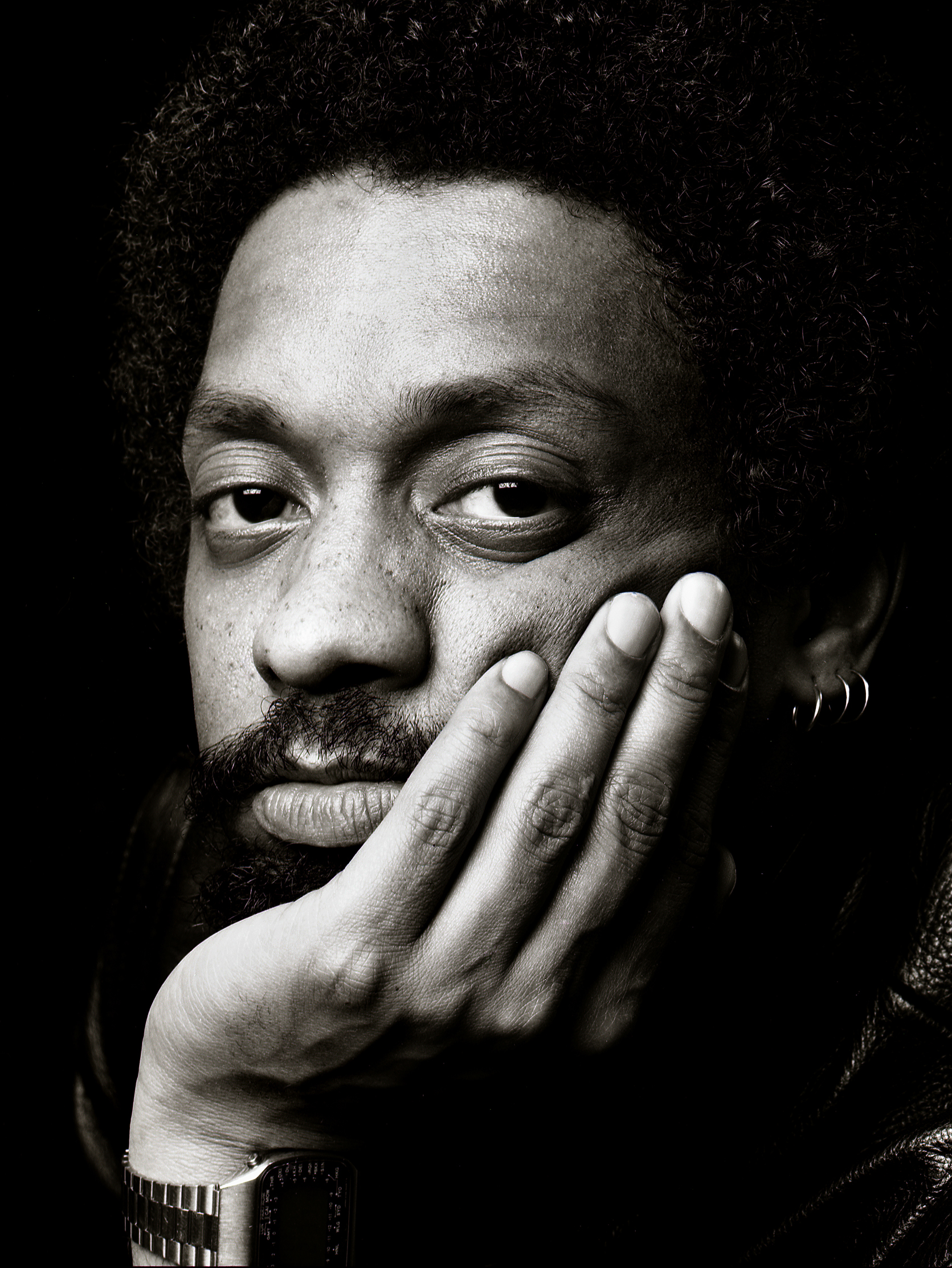
Chico Freeman - Portrait by Gert Chesi

1976 saw the release of Freeman's first album as lead musician, Morning Prayer. The next year he moved to New York City, and widened his musical influences. The following years would be the most productive of his career, producing albums such as No Time Left, Tradition in Transition, and The Outside Within; the last of which earned him Record of the Year from Stereo Review.

He came to prominence in the late 1970s as part of a movement including Wynton Marsalis of modern players steeped in the traditions of jazz, recording for independent labels like India Navigation and Contemporary Records. Freeman's albums contain standards and compositions by modernists like John Coltrane as well as new tunes by Freeman and his contemporaries such as bassist Cecil McBee. The line-up on his 1981 album Destiny's Dance includes Wynton Marsalis, Bobby Hutcherson, Cecil McBee (these two contributing compositions), with Freeman playing tenor saxophone and bass clarinet. Freeman formed the band Guataca and released Oh By the Way... in 2002. Freeman has toured internationally, both with his band as well as with Chaka Khan, Tomasz Stanko, Celia Cruz and Tito Puente. Members of Guataca include Hilton Ruiz, Ruben Rodriguez, Yoron Israel, and Giovanni Hidalgo.

In 1989, he put together an electric band called Brainstorm, consisting of himself, Delmar Brown (vocals and keyboards), Norman Hedman (percussion), Chris Walker (bassist), Archie Walker (drums).

In 1998, Freeman produced an album for Arthur Blythe called NightSong, and in 1999 he began teaching at New School University.

== Discography ==
- Morning Prayer (1976)
- Chico (1977)
- Beyond the Rain (1978)
- Kings of Mali (1978)
- The Outside Within (1978)
- Spirit Sensitive (1979)
- No Time Left (1979)
- Peaceful Heart, Gentle Spirit (1980)
- Destiny's Dance (1981)
- The Pied Piper (1986)
- Focus (1995)
