= Big Nick Nicholas =

American jazz saxophonist and singer (1922–1997)

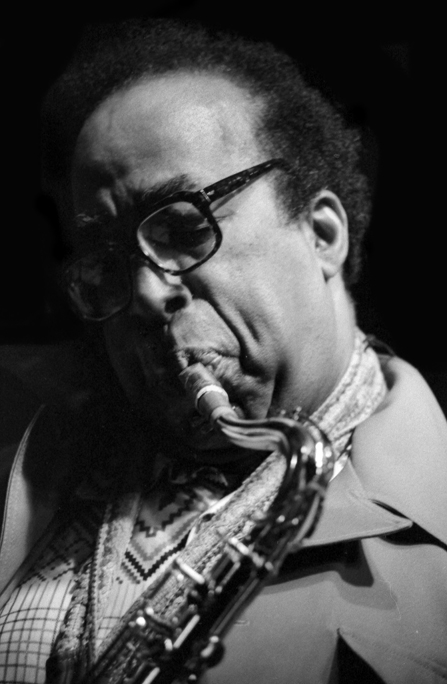
- Nicholas at Keystone Korner, San Francisco, California, in 1981

Background information
- Born: George Walker Nicholas; August 2, 1922; Lansing, Michigan, U.S.
- Origin: Queens, New York, U.S.
- Died: October 29, 1997 (aged 75) Queens, New York, U.S.
- Genre: Jazz
- Occupation: Musician
- Instruments: Tenor saxophone; vocals
- Years active: 1940–1997
- Label: India Navigation

George Walker "Big Nick" Nicholas (August 2, 1922 – October 29, 1997) was an American jazz saxophonist and singer.

== Career ==
Nicholas started playing with Hank and Thad Jones, Earl Hines, and Tiny Bradshaw before joining the U.S. army, and, on being discharged in the late 1940s, he worked with bands led by Sabby Lewis, J. C. Heard, and Lucky Millinder. He went on to play with Duke Ellington, Cab Calloway, Charlie Parker, Miles Davis, and Charles Mingus.

Nicholas contributed the 16-bar solo to Dizzy Gillespie's classic Afro-Cuban jazz piece "Manteca" (1947). At that time, he also began playing with Hot Lips Page, a working relationship that continued until 1954. He joined Buck Clayton in 1955.

Strongly influenced by his hero, Coleman Hawkins, Nicholas in turn influenced a young John Coltrane to compose his tribute "Big Nick", included on the 1962 album Duke Ellington & John Coltrane.

Nicholas lived for a few years in Charlottesville, Virginia, in the late 1970s and early 1980s, before returning to New York. In the 1980s, he released two albums under his own name, "Big and Warm" (1983), and "Big Nick" (1985), both on the India Navigation label.

Nicholas died of heart failure on October, 29, 1997, at the age of 75.

== Discography ==
=== As leader ===
- 1983: Big and Warm (India Navigation)
- 1985: Big Nick (India Navigation)

=== As sideman ===
- 1951: Trombone by Three, Bennie Green
- 1952: In Paris, Dizzy Gillespie
- 1952: Modern Jazz Trombone Series Vol. 2, J. J. Johnson
- 1956: Jazz Spectacular, Buck Clayton
- 1956: Trombone by Three, Bennie Green / J. J. Johnson / Kai Winding
- 2001: 1946–1950, Hot Lips Page
- 2001: Manteca, Dizzy Gillespie
- 2002: Bebop Professor, Dizzy Gillespie
- 2002: Go Ahead and Blow, Bennie Green
- 2003: 1944–1950: It's Magic, Sarah Vaughan
- 2005: Memories of You, Illinois Jacquet
