= James Newton (flutist) =

American flautist, composer, and conductor

- Born: May 1, 1953 (age 73); Los Angeles, California, U.S.
- Genres: Jazz
- Occupations: Musician, composer, bandleader
- Instrument: Concert flute
- Years active: 1978–present

James W. Newton (born May 1, 1953) is an American flautist who performs in jazz and classical styles.

== Biography ==
He was born in Los Angeles, California, United States. From his earliest years, James Newton grew up immersed in the sounds of African-American music, including urban blues, rhythm and blues, and gospel. In his early teens he played electric bass guitar, alto saxophone, and clarinet. In high school he took up the flute, influenced by Eric Dolphy. In addition to taking lessons in classical music on flute, he also studied jazz with Buddy Collette. He completed his formal musical training at California State University, Los Angeles.

From 1972 to 1975 Newton was a member of the group Black Music Infinity, led by drummer Stanley Crouch and also featuring David Murray, Bobby Bradford, and Arthur Blythe. From 1978 to 1981, he lived in New York, leading a trio with pianist and composer Anthony Davis and cellist Abdul Wadud. These three played extended chamber jazz and Third Stream compositions by Newton and Davis. With Davis, Newton founded a quartet and toured successfully in Europe in the early 1980s.

Afterwards, Newton performed with a wide variety of musicians, including projects by John Carter and the Mingus Dynasty. Newton has released four recordings of his solo improvisations for flute. Since the 1990s, Newton has often worked with musicians from other cultural spheres, including Jon Jang, Gao Hong, Kadri Gopalnath, and Shubhendra Rao, and has taken part in many cross-cultural projects.

Newton has performed with the New York Philharmonic, Brooklyn Philharmonic, L'Orchestre du Conservatoire de Paris, Vladimir Spivakov and the Moscow Virtuosi, the Los Angeles Master Chorale, Southwest Chamber Music, California EAR Unit, New York New Music Ensemble, and the San Francisco Ballet.

For five years Newton served Musical Director/Conductor of the Luckman Jazz Orchestra and also has held professorships at the University of California, Irvine, the California Institute of the Arts, and California State University, Los Angeles. In 1989, he wrote and published a method book entitled The Improvising Flute. In 2007, he published Daily Focus For The Flute.

He has also composed classical works for chamber ensemble and orchestra, as well as electronic music. In 1997, he wrote an opera, The Songs of Freedom. In his compositional output, Newton specializes in chamber music and writing for unconventional instrumentations. He has also written a symphony and composed for ballet and modern dance. In 2006, he composed a Latin Mass which premiered in Prato, Italy, in February 2007.

== Accolades ==
He has received Guggenheim (1992) and Rockefeller fellowships, Montreux Grande Prix Du Disque, and Down Beat International Critics Jazz Album of the Year.

== Beastie Boys lawsuit ==
In 2000, Newton sued the alternative rock and hip hop group Beastie Boys (and their producer, record companies, publishers, and music video-related companies) for repeatedly using a six-second, three-note sample of "Choir", Newton's 1978 composition for flute and voice, in their song "Pass the Mic". According to the group, Newton declined a settlement offer and, in a counter-offer, demanded "millions" and 50 percent ownership and control of "Pass the Mic", despite the sample being only one of hundreds of sounds in the song.

In the federal district court case, Newton claimed that the group infringed his copyright on the composition, by making use of the three-note sequence embodied in the sampled sound recording. The group argued that copyright law treats sound recordings and the underlying compositions as separate entities, with different thresholds for originality; a six-second audio clip must be licensed from the record company, but under the de minimis doctrine, a mere three notes of a composition need not be licensed from the composer or publisher.

With summary judgment in 2002, the court agreed with Beastie Boys, holding that the group had fulfilled its legal obligation by licensing only the sound recording in 1992. At that time, Beastie Boys paid a fee of US$1,000 to ECM Records, the record label to which Newton had previously given contractual permission to license the sound recording. As is standard procedure in copyright cases, Beastie Boys then asked the court for Newton's lawyers to reimburse Beastie Boys' lawyers for $492,000 in legal fees, but the court declined to award costs.

Newton appealed, but in 2003, a three-judge panel of the Ninth Circuit Court of Appeals upheld the lower court's decision in favor of Beastie Boys. Newton petitioned the court to re-hear the case en banc, but this resulted in a 2004 amended opinion in which the court strengthened its position.

== Discography ==
=== As leader ===
- 1977: Solomon's Sons (Circle)
- 1977: Binu (Circle, with Mark Dresser, Tylon Barea, Rudolf Kreis)
- 1978: Paseo del Mar (India Navigation)
- 1979: Hidden Voices (India Navigation) with Anthony Davis
- 1979: The Mystery School (India Navigation)
- 1981: Axum (ECM)
- 1982: James Newton (Gramavision)
- 1982: Portraits (India Navigation)
- 1983: Luella (Gramavision)
- 1984: Echo Canyon (Celestial Harmonies)
- 1985: The African Flower (Blue Note)
- 1987: Romance and Revolution (Blue Note)
- 1984: In Venice (Celestial Harmonie)
- 1990: If Love (with Billy Hart, Anthony Cox, Mike Cain)
- 1990: Trio2 with Anthony Davis, Abdul Wadud (Gramavision)
- 1994: Suite for Frida Kahlo (Sledgehammer Blues)
- 1996: David Murray/James Newton Quintet (DIW) with David Murray
- 1997: Above Is Above All (Contour)

=== As sideman ===
With Arthur Blythe

- Lenox Avenue Breakdown (Columbia, 1979)

With John Carter

- Dauwhe (Black Saint, 1982)

With Buddy Collette

- Flute Talk (Soul Note, 1988)

With Andrew Cyrille

- X Man (Soul Note, 1994)
- Good to Go, with a Tribute to Bu (Soul Note, 1997)

With Chico Freeman

- Peaceful Heart, Gentle Spirit (Contemporary, 1980)

With Leroy Jenkins

- Mixed Quintet (Black Saint, 1979)

With David Murray

- Creole (Justin Time, 1998)

With Sirone

- Artistry (Of The Cosmos, 1979)
