= Jon Jang =

American jazz pianist, composer, and bandleader (born 1954)

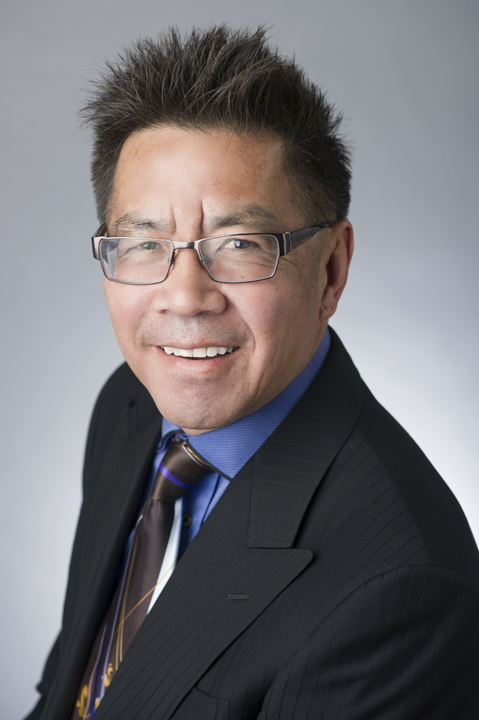
- Jang c. 2014

Background information
- Born: Jon Jang; March 11, 1954 (age 72); U.S.
- Genres: Jazz
- Occupations: Musician; bandleader; composer
- Instrument: Piano
- Years active: 1978 - present
- Labels: Asian Improv Arts; Soul Note; RPM; Finnadar; New World Records
- Website: www.jonjang.com

Jon Jang (Chinese: 胡 健 良; pinyin: Hú Jiànliáng; born March 11, 1954) is an American jazz pianist, composer, and bandleader. Of Chinese ancestry, he specializes in music which combines elements of jazz and Asian musics, and is known for musical works exploring international as well as Asian American social justice struggles.

== Career ==
Jang holds a B.Mus. degree in piano performance from the Oberlin Conservatory of Music (1978), where he studied African American music with Dr. Wendell Logan, who Jang describes as a "mentor and a father figure." Jang has recorded many albums as a composer-bandleader and pianist, performing with Max Roach, David Murray (saxophonist), James Newton, Francis Wong, and Fred Ho, among numerous others.

Jang lives in San Francisco, California. He has recorded for the Asian Improv and Soul Note labels and has performed at leading music venues including Alice Tully Hall, the Beijing Jazz Festival, the Monterey Jazz Festival, and the Walker Art Center, as well as San Francisco venues such as the Chinatown Music Festival. From 1999 to 2001, Jang toured with Max Roach as part of the Beijing Trio, which included performances at London's Royal Festival Hall and the Berlin Jazz Festival. He has been awarded two commissions from Cal Performances and has performed four times under the organization's auspices. He has received composition commissions from the Library of Congress and the Kronos Quartet, and in 2000 received the Creative Capital Award in the discipline of Performing Arts.

== Music and politics ==
In the early 1980s, Jang began releasing recordings as a bandleader that included Are you Chinese or Charlie Chan? (1983, RPM) and The Ballad or the Bullet? (1988, Asian Improv), the latter referencing Malcolm X's famous speech "The Ballot or the Bullet." Jang and Francis Wong first founded the record label Asian Improv Records to support work by Jang, Glenn Horiuchi and other Asian American artists, and in 1987 created Asian Improv aRts (using the same acronym, AIR) as a non-profit organization that continues to support both Asian Improv Records and other educational and community activities in order "to produce, present and document artistic works that represent the Asian American experience."

Jang has said his music during much of the 1980s paralleled the Asian American movement, in which he was also engaged as a political activist. Young Asian Americans were also inspired by the artistic-political synergy of the Black Arts Movement, and as an organization, AIR drew inspiration directly from earlier Black artist collectives such as the Association for the Advancement of Creative Musicians (AACM) of Chicago, the Black Artist Group (BAG) of St. Louis, as well as the Union of God's Musicians and Artists Ascension (UGMAA) of Los Angeles.

Reparations Now! Concerto for Jazz Ensemble and Taiko was one of Jang's first major works of this period, referencing the Redress and Reparations movement. Inspired by Horace Tapscott and his Pan Afrikan Peoples Arkestra, Jang named the performing ensemble the Pan Asian Arkestra. Tapscott taught Jang about "passin' the magic" onto future generations through the Ark and the music. Additionally, Jang learned from Black mentors such as Max Roach, Amiri Baraka, Horace Tapscott, and Wendell Logan that, as James Baldwin noted, "this music begins on the auction block." As Jang and Francis Wong have described, 1988 marked a turning point both for the Asian American movement and their own work as artists and activists:

"The Redress and Reparations movement was a civil rights victory for the 1980s. One of the first major works after Are You Chinese or Charlie Chan? was Reparations Now! Concerto for Jazz Ensemble and Taiko. From 1980 to 1988 we were informed by the movement. After that, the Asian American movement was re-defined."

Jang's work during the 1990s reflects an increasingly international perspective on social justice struggles and a deeper engagement with Chinese American history, the latter resonating artistically with his expanding use of Chinese traditional musical materials and instruments. His 1996 composition Island: the Immigrant Suite No.2 reflected on San Francisco's Angel Island Immigration Station, and his major work with the Pan Asian Arkestra, Tiananmen! was released on Soul Note in 1993 and performed on the main stage of the Chicago Jazz Festival in 1994. Francis Wong describes the latter as a significant breakthrough in exposure for the work they had been cultivating in the early 1990s, noting that although AIR was still too small an organization to receive significant funding, they nonetheless succeeded in finding enough community support to enable performances and recordings that led to this broader exposure and enabled Jang to be signed by the Soul Note record label .

One of Jang's next major projects, When Sorrow Turns to Joy (2000), is a collaboration with composer James Newton and poet Genny Lim that also reflects the shift to internationally framed political themes as well as Jang's expanding network of artistic collaborators. The work is a tribute to Paul Robeson and Mei Lanfang, who Jang praises as "international citizens of the world" who were "not only great artists for the people but they also were outspoken. They were people that had integrity and took stands against oppression."

Though often written about by critics as primarily a jazz musician, Jang has also composed notated works for classical performers, and in addition to numerous jazz influences, has cited composers such as William Grant Still as models for his approach to memorializing history and exploring political struggles through musical composition. Jang's 2007 Chinese American Symphony, premiered in 2007 by the Sacramento Philharmonic Orchestra, is a symphonic composition addressing the history of Chinese immigrant railroad workers in the late 19th century.

Building on his history of collaboration with African American artists and cultural work since the 1980s, Jang has also created work explicitly aligned with the later Black Lives Matter movement, including "Can't Stop Cryin' for America! (Black Lives Matter)," a 2017 collaboration with poet Amanda Kemp.

As a public intellectual, Jang has given a number of presentations at universities and colleges throughout the U.S. such as Columbia University, Stanford University, Brown University, and UCLA on topics such as "Traditions in Transformation: The Musical Language of Jon Jang," "Sounds of Struggle: Music from the Black Liberation Movement of the 1960s to the Asian American Movement of the 1980s," and "One Day American, One Day Alien: Black and Brown Artists Who Made the National Anthem Their Own." In 2012, Jang was awarded the Martin Luther King Jr./Césár Chavez/Rosa Parks Visiting Professorship at the University of Michigan.

== Discography ==
As Leader or Co-Leader

Year recorded	Title	Ensemble(s)	Label
1982	Jang	Jon Jang, United Front	RPM
1984	Are You Chinese or Charlie Chan?	Jon Jang Septet	RPM
1987	The Ballad or the Bullet?	Jon Jang Quartet	Asian Improv
1990	Never Give Up!	Jon Jang & the Pan Asian Arkestra	Asian Improv
1991	Kulintang Arts Live with Jon Jang		
1992	Self Defense!	Jon Jang & the Pan Asian Arkestra	Soul Note
1993	Tiananmen!	Jon Jang & the Pan Asian Arkestra	Soul Note
1996	Two Flowers on a Stem	Jon Jang Sextet: Jiebing Chen, James Newton, David Murray (saxophonist), Santi Debriano, and Billy Hart	Soul Note
1997	Island: The Immigrant Suite No. 1	with Genny Lim	Soul Note
1997	Dance of the Golden World	with Maxine Hong Kingston	Spoken Engine
1999	Beijing Trio	Beijing Trio: Jang, Jiebing Chen, and Max Roach	Asian Improv
1999	Self Portrait		Asian Improv
2002	River of Life	with David Murray (saxophonist)	Asian Improv
2006	Paper Son, Paper Songs	Jon Jang Seven	Asian Improv
2018	The Pledge of Black Asian Allegiance	Jon Jangtet	Asian Improv

As Ensemble Performer

Year recorded	Title	Leader / Ensemble(s)	Label
1985	Tomorrow is Now!	Fred Ho's Afro-Asian Music Ensemble	Soul Note
1986	Bamboo That Snaps Back	Fred Ho's Asian American Art Ensemble	Finnadar
1988	A Song For Manong	Fred Ho's Asian American Art Ensemble	Asian Improv
1988	We Refuse to Be Used and Abused	Fred Ho's Afro-Asian Music Ensemble	Soul Note
1993	Great Wall	Francis Wong Great Wall Quartet	Asian Improv
1996	Testament: A Conduction Collection	Lawrence D. "Butch" Morris	New World
1998	Big Bands Behind Barbed Wire	Asian American Orchestra	Asian Improv
1999	Far East Suite	Anthony Brown's Asian American Orchestra	Asian Improv
2003	Child of War	Genny Lim	
