= Mark Feldman =

American violinist (born 1955)

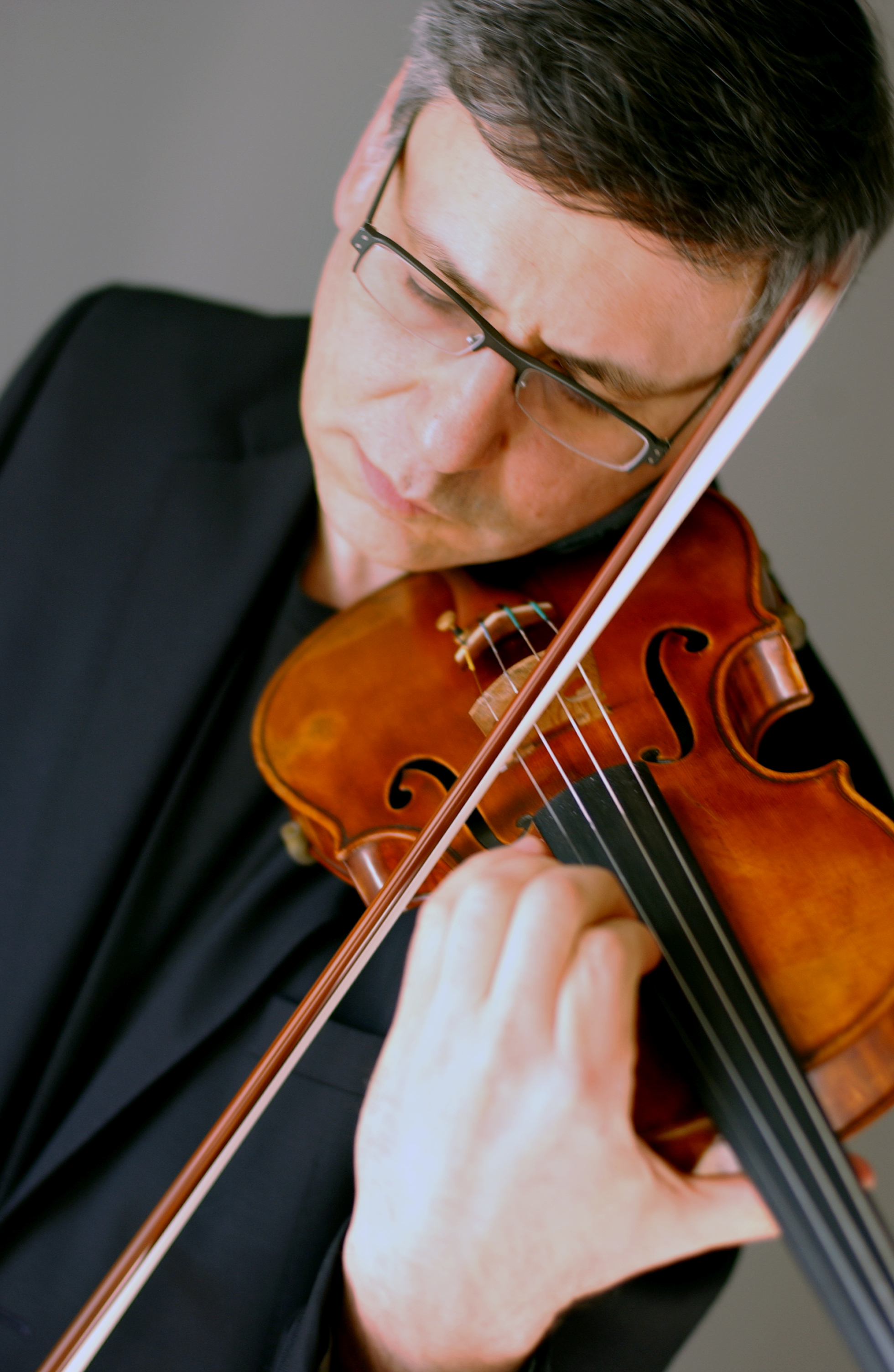
- Feldman in 2006

Background information
- Born: July 17, 1955 (age 71); Chicago, Illinois, U.S.
- Genres: Jazz; avant-garde
- Occupations: Musician, composer
- Instrument: Violin
- Labels: Tzadik, Enja, ECM

Mark Feldman (born 1955 in Chicago) is an American jazz violinist.

== Biography ==
Feldman worked in Chicago from 1973 to 1980, in Nashville, Tennessee from 1980 to 1986, in New York City and Western Europe from 1986. From 1989 to 1996 he performed with Dave Douglas, Andy Laster, Tom Rainey, and Kermit Driscoll in the jazz quintet New and Used. He has performed with John Zorn, John Abercrombie, The Masada String Trio, Uri Caine, and Billy Hart.

He was a member of the Civic Orchestra of Chicago and played in many bar bands in Chicago. He played on over 200 recordings in Nashville as a studio musician, was a member of the Nashville Symphony, and was a member of the touring groups of country western entertainers Loretta Lynn and Ray Price.

In 2003, he was soloist with Netherlands Radio Philharmonic Orchestra in Guus Janssen's Violin Concerto and with the WDR Jazz Orchestra in Concerto for Violin and Jazz Orchestra by Bill Dobbins. At New York's Lincoln Center he performed in duo with pianists Paul Bley and Muhal Richard Abrams.

He has recorded with Michael Brecker, Lee Konitz, Joe Lovano, and Chris Potter and has played on over 100 recordings in New York City as a soloist in contemporary music and modern jazz.

Feldman has released several albums, including Music for Violin Alone (Tzadik, 1995); Book of Tells (Enja, 2000); What Exit (ECM, 2006 with British pianist John Taylor; To Fly to Steal (Intakt, 2010) with bassist Thomas Morgan and drummer Gerry Hemingway; and Oblivia (Tzadik, 2010) with his wife, Swiss pianist Sylvie Courvoisier.

== Discography ==
=== As leader/co-leader ===
- Music for Violin Alone (Tzadik, 1995)
- Music for Violin and Piano (Avant, 1999)
- Book of Tells (Enja, 2005)
- What Exit (ECM, 2006)
- Secrets (Tzadik, 2009) with Uri Caine, Greg Cohen, Joey Baron
- To Fly to Steal Sylvie Courvoisier-Mark Feldman Quartet with Thomas Morgan and Gerry Hemingway(Intakt 2010)
- Oblivia with Sylvie Courvoisier (Tzadik, 2010)
- Hôtel du Nord Sylvie Courvoisier-Mark Feldman Quartet with Thomas Morgan and Gerry Hemingway(Intakt, 2011)
- Live at Theatre Vidy–Lausanne – Sylvie Courvoisier–Mark Feldman Duo (Intakt, 2013)
- Birdies for Lulu–Sylvie Courvoisier–Mark Feldman Quartet with Scott Colley and Billy Mintz (Intakt, 2014)
- Miller's Tale–Sylvie Courvoisier–Mark Feldman - Evan Parker- Ikue Mori (Intakt, 2016)

With the Arcado String Trio

- Arcado (album) (JMT, 1989)
- Behind the Myth (JMT, 1990)
- For Three Strings and Orchestra (JMT, 1992) with Kölner Rundfunk Orchester conducted by David de Villiers
- Green Dolphy Suite (Enja, 1995) with Trio De Clarinets
- Live in Europe (Avant, 1996)

=== As sideman ===
With John Abercrombie

- Open Land (ECM, 1998)
- Cat 'n' Mouse (ECM, 2000)
- Class Trip (ECM, 2003)
- The Third Quartet (ECM, 2006)
- Wait Till You See Her (ECM, 2008)

With Muhal Richard Abrams

- One Line, Two Views (New World, 1995)
- The Visibility of Thought (Mutable, 2001)

With Ray Anderson

- Big Band Record (Gramavision, 1994) with the George Gruntz Concert Jazz Band

With Tim Berne

- Tim Berne's Fractured Fairy Tales (JMT, 1989)

With Don Byron

- Don Byron Plays the Music of Mickey Katz (Nonesuch, 1993)

With Uri Caine

- Urlicht / Primal Light (Winter & Winter, 1997)
- Wagner e Venezia (Winter & Winter, 1997)
- The Sidewalks of New York: Tin Pan Alley (Winter & Winter, 1999)
- Gustav Mahler in Toblach (Winter & Winter, 1999)
- Gustav Mahler: Dark Flame (Winter & Winter, 2003)

With The Chromatic Persuaders

- The Chromatic Persuaders (Konnex, 1994)
- Extrospection (Timescraper, 1998)

With Sylvie Courvoisier

- Abaton (ECM, 2003)

With Marilyn Crispell

- Santuerio (Leo, 1993)

With Dave Douglas

- Parallel Worlds (Soul Note, 1993)
- Five (Soul Note, 1996)
- Charms of the Night Sky (Winter & Winter, 1998)
- Convergence (Soul Note, 1999)
- A Thousand Evenings (RCA, 2000)
- El Trilogy (BMG, 2001)
- Witness (RCA, 2001

With Yelena Eckemoff

- Leaving Everything Behind (L & H, 2016)

With Billy Hart

- Amethyst (Arabesque, 1993)
- Oceans of Time (Arabesque, 1997)

With One Ring Zero

- Planets (Urban Geek, 2010)

With Marc Ribot

- Soundtracks Volume 2 (Tzadik, 2003)

With Dave Soldier

- Mark Twain's War Prayer / Ultraviolet Railroad (Newport Classics, 1996)
- The Kropotkins (Koch Records, 1996)

With They Might Be Giants

- Flood (Elektra, 1990)

With Tom Varner

- The Mystery of Compassion (Soul Note, 1992)

With Jarek Śmietana

- Jarek Śmietana Band – A Tribute To Zbigniew Seifert (featuring Jerry Goodman, Didier Lockwood, Krzesimir Dębski, Christian Howes, Maciej Strzelczyk, Adam Bałdych, Pierre Blanchard, Mateusz Smoczyński: JSR Records – JSR 0011, 2009)

With John Zorn

- Kristallnacht (Eva, 1993)
- Bar Kokhba (Tzadik, 1996)
- Filmworks VI: 1996 (Tzadik, 1997)
- Duras: Duchamp (Tzadik, 1997)
- The Circle Maker (Tzadik, 1998)
- Filmworks VIII: 1997 (Tzadik, 1998)
- The String Quartets (Tzadik, 1999)
- Taboo & Exile (Tzadik, 1999)
- Filmworks XI: Secret Lives (Tzadik, 2002)
- Cobra: John Zorn's Game Pieces Volume 2 (Tzadik, 2002)
- Filmworks XII: Three Documentaries (Tzadik, 2002)
- Masada Recital (Tzadik, 2004) with Sylvie Courvoisier
- Filmworks XVIII: The Treatment (Tzadik, 2006)
- 50th Birthday Celebration Volume 1 (Tzadik, 2004) with Masada String Trio
- 50th Birthday Celebration Volume 11 (Tzadik, 2005) with Bar Kokhba Sextet
- Azazel: Book of Angels Volume 2 (Tzadik, 2005) with Masada String Trio
- Malphas: Book of Angels Volume 3 (Tzadik, 2005) with Sylvie Courvoisier
- Lucifer: Book of Angels Volume 10 (Tzadik, 2008) with Bar Kokhba Sextet
- Filmworks XX: Sholem Aleichem (Tzadik, 2008)
- Haborym: Book of Angels Volume 16 (Tzadik, 2010) with Masada String Trio
- The Concealed (Tzadik, 2012)
