= Latin lover =

Stereotyped stock character

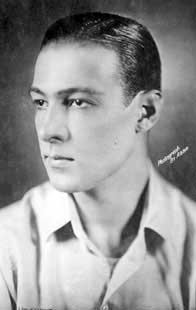
Rudolph Valentino, the original "Latin lover", who epitomized the type

Latin lover is a stereotypical stock character, part of the Hollywood star system. It appeared for the first time in Hollywood in the 1920s and, for the most part, lost popularity during World War II. In time, the type evolved, developing various local variants and gradually incorporating attributes other than the originally defining physical characteristics.

== Characteristics ==
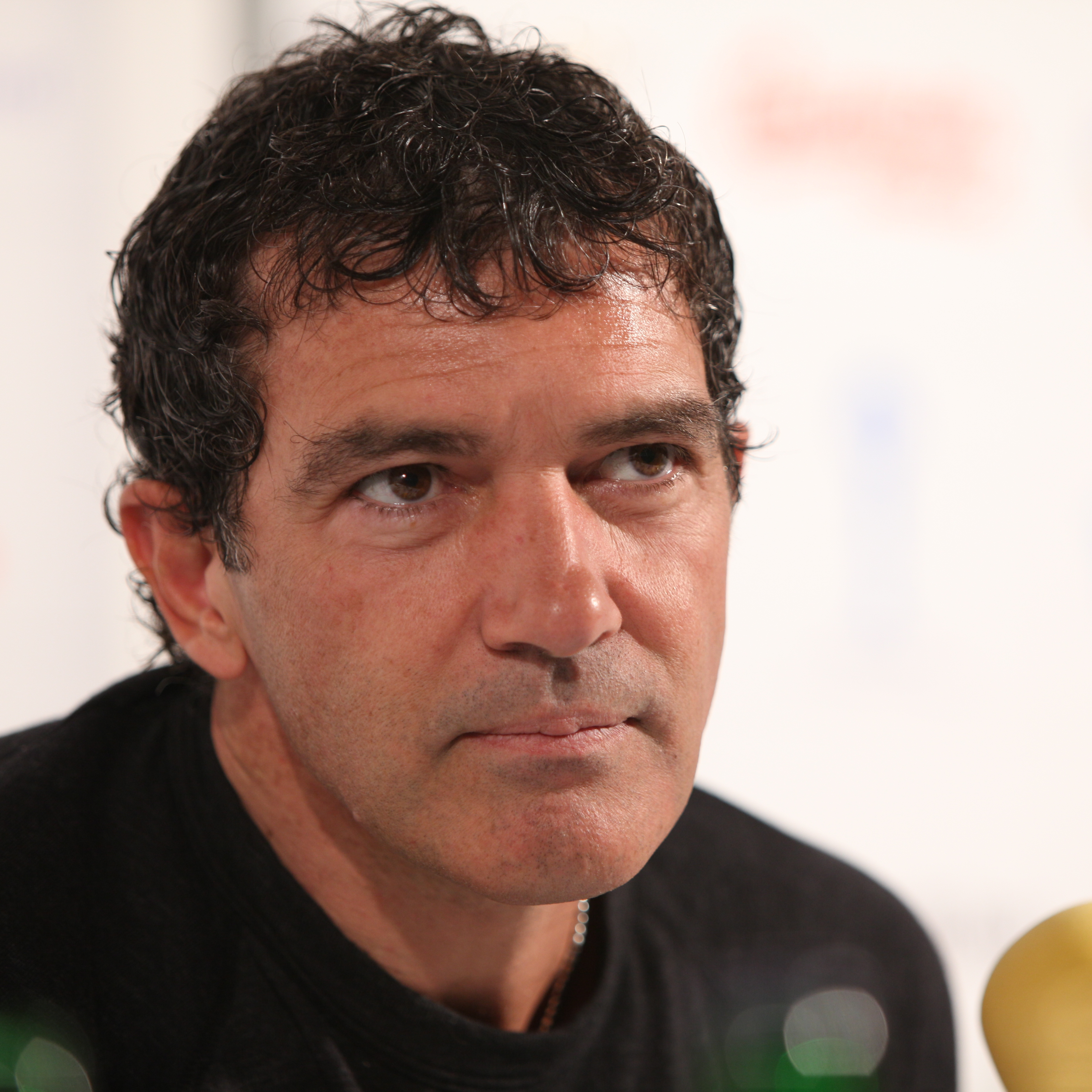
Antonio Banderas, one of the latest incarnations of the type

The Latin lover was the first male acting type in the history of filmmaking whose behavior and destiny are set through his love relations with a woman, hence 'lover'. Though, as the type was depicted in the beginning, the term 'seducer' would be more suitable. Major characteristics describing the type include:

- Appearance: He is always handsome or, for the reigning standard of the period, different or atypical looking.
- Behavior: The way he conquers women, using a sharp, focused glare, and certain mannerisms characterized by outbursts of passion, dancing, etc.
- Type of roles: He is usually a romantic, exotic hero and foreigner, mostly a historical person or character in literature, often the victim of an intrigue that insinuates the doomed affair.
- Genre: Mostly melodramas, and if it happens to be some other type of a movie, it must have melodramatic overtones.

When he appeared, the Latin lover was opposed to the absolutely dominant type of male character in Hollywood at the time, a man of action, who represented a fighter for justice, freedom or some other cause. At the same time, the Latin lover was the first distinct non-American type. It was the result of several factors: a crisis of faith in the supremacy of a male as a consequence of the horrors of World War I, growing female emancipation, and Hollywood's effort to conquer the film markets of Europe, whose audience was deemed more refined at the time. The non-American attributes of the type and the fact that a noticeable number of European actors moved their careers to Hollywood has made some film historians, like Enno Patalas, prefer the term 'stranger' instead of a 'lover'.

== Origin ==
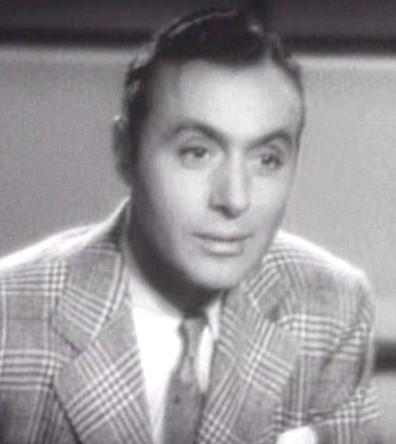
Charles Boyer, creator of the French lover cliché

Because of the American idea of what a Latin lover should look like (dark hair, darker complexion), initial representatives of the type were indeed of southern European or Latin American origin. The first was Italian-born Rudolph Valentino. Director George Fitzmaurice, who directed Valentino in several of his movies, was very important for the launching of Latin lover character. Valentino is universally considered as the supreme representative of the type in film history. In 1921, Valentino starred in Rex Ingram's The Four Horsemen of the Apocalypse. Though not the top billed actor in the movie, playing a French paramour who gets killed in World War I, he became an instant star, as the "ideal lover" of Hollywood. Soon, the media aura of "Latin lover" developed around him. For female fans, he became a symbol of masculinity, passion and mystic eroticism, a seducer who conquers women just by gazing at them. Male moviegoers, however, considered him artificial, noting his feminine manners and even grotesque acting. Yet, Valentino as the Latin lover was the first male star who "brought women to ecstasy", as previously only the female counterparts, the vamps, existed in Hollywood movies.

Despite continuous attacks from the yellow press, which included accusations of homosexuality and "strong women" who steer his career, Valentino's movies earned unprecedented amounts of money. A symbol of what a lover should be and look like in the 1920s, his enormous popularity was enhanced by his unusual personal life and the fact that he was the first male star whose private life was compared to those of the characters he played. The Valentino myth was sealed with his premature death at the age of 31, as it was followed by massive hysteria and collapses of the fans and his fellow actresses, a huge funeral with almost 100,000 people, and alleged suicides of several women. Other typecast actors such as Ramon Novarro, Ricardo Cortez, Antonio Moreno, Gilbert Roland, Rod La Rocque and Adolphe Menjou, the first who brought a certain measure of cynicism to the type, would follow.

As the Latin lovers rapidly gained popularity with the audience, the 'non-Latin' characteristics increased, so the variations of the type developed, which made the use of 'stranger' instead of 'lover' more acceptable. In Great Britain, the originator was Ivor Novello, and Ronald Colman added the Englishness, creating the type of an English gentleman. Central European and local German flavors were presented by Erich von Stroheim and Conrad Veidt, respectively, while a very popular Russian exemplar was Ivan Mosjoukine.

When it comes to the American actors in the later silent period, almost without any competition from other fellow actors, the type was embodied by John Barrymore and John Gilbert. In the sound period, most popular American actors of the type were William Powell, Fredric March, Melvyn Douglas and commercially extremely successful Robert Taylor and Tyrone Power. The 'French lover cliché' type was created by Charles Boyer, while popular British actors, prior to World War II, include Laurence Olivier, Leslie Howard, Robert Donat, David Niven and James Mason. Britons in general added much more realism to the type, while Mason represented a bit of a 'sadistic' derivative. Massimo Girotti was an Italian version.

Though actors like Douglas Fairbanks and Anthony Quinn are sometimes placed in this category, they actually belonged to the adventurer or the swashbuckler type.

== After World War II ==
Outbreak of the war made the type look totally obsolete, so after the war ended only rare actors appeared in the type, and even then, only for the short period of their careers: Louis Jourdan and Gérard Philipe in the late 1940s, Tony Curtis and Rossano Brazzi in the 1950s and Omar Sharif in the late 1960s. Marcello Mastroianni did some type acting but also very effectively evoked and parodied it in several films, while only partially it was represented by Robert Redford, Burt Reynolds, Gérard Depardieu and Michael York in the 1970s. Still, the type survived through the 1980s in the cinema of South America and was revived to some extent in the 1990s with Antonio Banderas.

Other Latin Lovers of world cinema, partially or through their whole careers, include Warner Baxter, Iván Petrovich, Pierre Blanchard, George Raft, Cesar Romero, Fernando Lamas, Ricardo Montalbán, Sal Mineo, John Gavin, George Hamilton, Jean-Paul Belmondo, Alain Delon, Al Pacino, Sylvester Stallone, John Travolta, Andy García, Olivier Martinez and Vincent Perez.

Following the "Latin explosion" in the music industry in the late 1990s, some artists were referred to as such because of their image, such as Julio Iglesias, his son Enrique Iglesias, Ricky Martin and Luis Miguel.
