= Union of God's Musicians and Artists Ascension =

The Union of God's Musicians and Artists Ascension (UGMAA) was a collective of African American jazz musicians formed by Horace Tapscott in the late 1960s. It was part of his work with the Pan Afrikan Peoples Arkestra (PAPA), founded in 1961, which aimed to preserve, develop and publicize African American music. UGMAA was the successor of the Underground Musicians Association (UGMA), founded in 1963, of which P.A.P.A. became a part.

The collective was partly set up to find employment for African American musicians, dancers and visual artists in Los Angeles. Political influences of the time included John Coltrane, Ornette Coleman, Malcolm X and H. Rap Brown.

Within UGMAA, Horace Tapscott offered poor youths free music lessons, and later enlisted them into the P.A.P.A. Famous musicians involved with UGMAA included Arthur Blythe, Stanley Crouch, Butch Morris, Joe Sample, Wilber Morris, David Murray, Jimmy Woods, Nate Morgan and Guido Sinclair.
