= Billy Hart =

American jazz drummer and educator (born 1940)

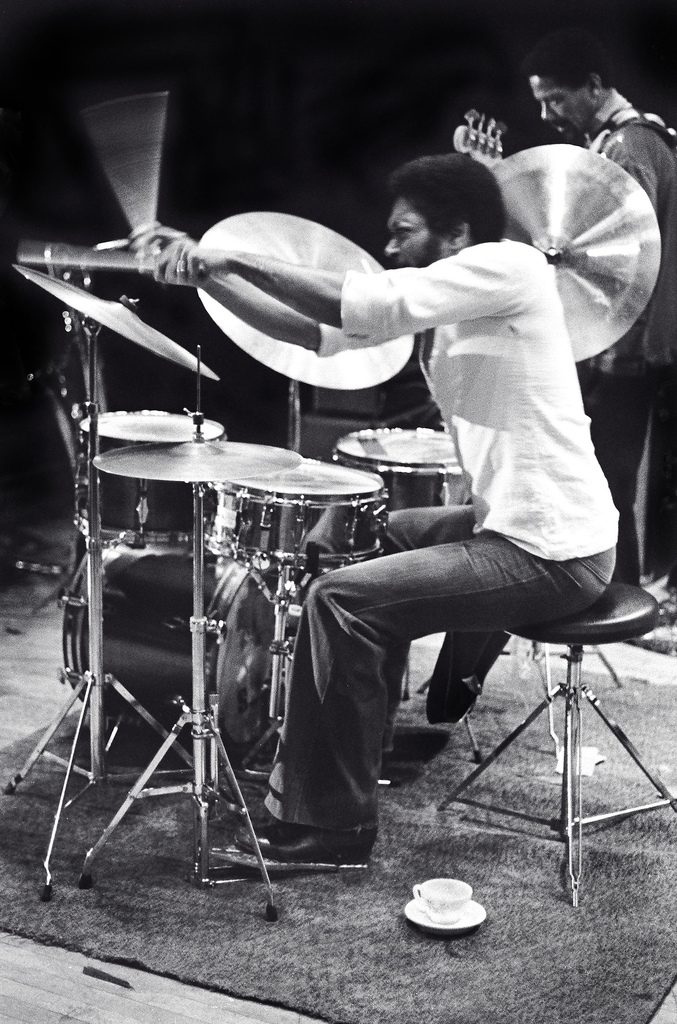
- Hart performing in 1978

Background information
- Born: November 29, 1940 (age 85); Washington, D.C., U.S.
- Genres: Jazz, jazz fusion
- Occupations: Musician, educator
- Instrument: Drums
- Years active: 1958-present
- Labels: Horizon, Gramavision, Arabesque, HighNote, Enja, SteepleChase, ECM
- Website: www.billyhartmusic.com

Billy Hart (born November 29, 1940) is an American jazz drummer and educator. He is known internationally for his contributions with Herbie Hancock's "Mwandishi" band in the early 1970s, as well as with Shirley Horn, Stan Getz, and Quest, among many others.

== Biography ==
Hart was born in Washington, D.C. and raised in a musical family. His paternal grandmother was a pianist who accompanied Marian Anderson. His maternal grandmother purchased his first drum kit. Hart grew up in close proximity of the Spotlite Club, where he first heard the music of Lee Morgan, Ahmad Jamal, and Miles Davis, among others.

Early on in his career he performed with Otis Redding and Sam and Dave, then with Buck Hill. Although he studied mechanical engineering at Howard University, he left school early to tour with Shirley Horn, whom Hart credits with accelerating his musical development. Local saxophonist Buck Hill also served as a mentor and first introduced him to records by Charlie Parker. Hart was a sideman with the Montgomery Brothers (1961), Jimmy Smith (1964–1966), and Wes Montgomery (1966–68). Following Montgomery's death in 1968, Hart moved to New York City, where he recorded with McCoy Tyner, Wayne Shorter, Joe Zawinul, and Pharoah Sanders (playing on his famed recording Karma in 1969), in addition to playing with Eddie Harris, Joanne Brackeen, and Marian McPartland.

Hart was a member of Herbie Hancock's "Mwandishi" sextet from 1969 to 1973, recording three albums with Hancock (Mwandishi, Crossings, and Sextant) in this period. He subsequently went on to perform with Tyner (1973–74), Stan Getz (1974–77), and Quest (1980s), in addition to extensive freelance playing (including recording with Miles Davis on 1972's On the Corner). He recorded his debut album Enchance in 1977, supported by musicians such as Don Pullen, Dave Holland, and Dewey Redman. Holland returned to play on Hart’s third release Oshumare in 1984, which also featured Branford Marsalis and Bill Frisell, among others.

Since the early 1990s, Hart has been associated with Oberlin Conservatory of Music. He also teaches at the New England Conservatory of Music, as well as holding an adjunct faculty position at Western Michigan University. He also conducts private lessons through the New School and New York University. The drummer often contributes to the Stokes Forest Music Camp and the Dworp Summer Jazz Clinic in Belgium.

Hart first formed his current Quartet (composed of Mark Turner, Ethan Iverson, and Ben Street) in 2003; they have gone on to record three albums as a group, most recently for ECM Records. He also performs with guitarist Assaf Kehati, and is a member of the band known as the Cookers, typically consisting of Eddie Henderson, David Weiss, Craig Handy (or Billy Harper), George Cables, and Cecil McBee. The band has toured extensively and has recorded six albums together.

In 2021, Hart was announced as a 2022 National Endowment for the Arts (NEA) Jazz Master, along Stanley Clarke, Cassandra Wilson, and Donald Harrison, Jr.

Hart resides in Montclair, New Jersey, where he has a music studio described by JazzTimes as his "inner sanctum".

== Discography ==
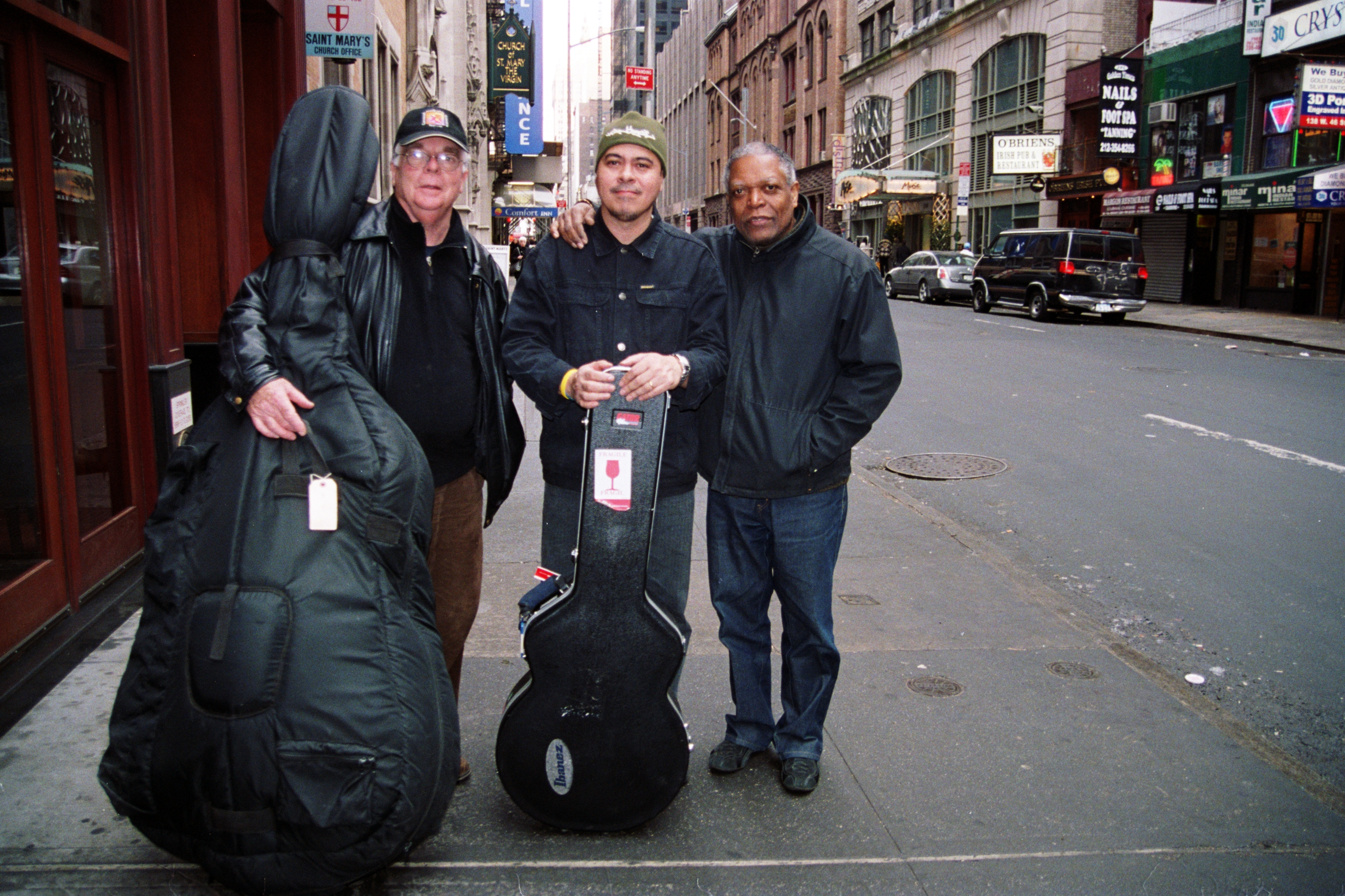
Billy Hart (right), Johnny Alegre (center), and bassist Ron McClure (left), recording Johnny Alegre 3 in New York City

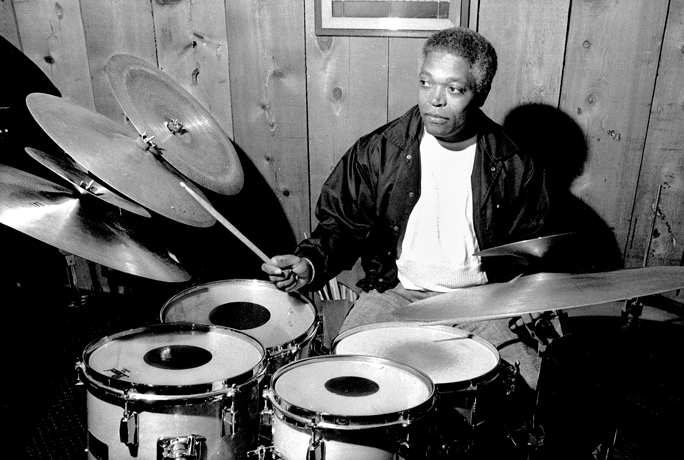
Billy Hart at Bach Dancing & Dynamite Society, Half Moon Bay, California

=== As leader or co-leader ===
- Enchance (Horizon, 1977)
- The Trio with Walter Bishop Jr. & George Mraz (Progressive, 1982)
- Oshumare (Gramavision, 1984)
- Rah (Gramavision, 1988)
- Amethyst (Arabesque, 1993)
- Oceans of Time (Arabesque, 1997)
- Billy Hart Quartet (HighNote, 2006)
- Route F (Enja, 2006)
- Live at the Cafe Damberd (Enja, 2009)
- Sixty-Eight (SteepleChase, 2011)
- All Our Reasons (ECM, 2012)
- Tribal Ghost (NoBusiness, 2013) with John Tchicai, Charlie Kohlhase, Garrison Fewell, and Cecil McBee
- One Is the Other (ECM, 2014)
- Multidirectional (Smoke Sessions, 2023)
- Just (ECM, 2025)

=== As sideman ===
Dates indicate the year of the album's release. If the recording was issued more than a year later, the recording date is followed by the release date in brackets. "With" marks collaborative recordings as band and with the musicians equal credit for the album. Otherwise the Leader/line-up column is sorted by the musician's first name. Musicians and labels are only linked on first appearance.

| Date | Leader/line-up | Album | Label |
|---|---|---|---|
| 1961 [1980] | Wes Montgomery | Live at Jorgies Jazz Club | VGM |
| 1961, 1968 [?] | Wes Montgomery | Live at Jorgies Jazz Club and More | VGM |
| 1963 | Buck Clarke | The Buck Clarke Sound | Argo |
| 1964 | Jimmy Smith | Christmas Cookin' | Verve |
| 1965 | Jimmy Smith | The Amazing Jimmy Smith Trio Live at the Village Gate | Metro |
| 1965 | Jimmy Smith | Live in Concert – The Incredible Jimmy Smith | Metro |
| 1965 | Jimmy Smith | La métamorphose des cloportes (O.S.T.) | Verve |
| 1968 | Eddie Harris | Pourquoi l'Amérique (O.S.T.) | AZ |
| 1968 | Eddie Harris | Silver Cycles | Atlantic |
| 1968 | Paul Jeffrey Quintet | Electrifying Sounds of the Paul Jeffrey Quintet | Savoy |
| 1969 | Eddie Harris | High Voltage | Atlantic |
| 1969 | Eddie Harris | Free Speech | Atlantic |
| 1969 | Melvin Jackson | Funky Skull | Limelight |
| 1969 | Pharoah Sanders | Karma | Impulse! |
| 1969 [1973] | Pharoah Sanders | Izipho Zam (My Gifts) | Strata-East |
| 1970 | Marian McPartland | Ambiance | Halcyon |
| 1970 [1974] | McCoy Tyner | Asante | Blue Note |
| 1971 | Herbie Hancock | Mwandishi | Warner Bros. |
| 1971 | Harold Land | A New Shade of Blue | Mainstream |
| 1971 | Wayne Shorter | Odyssey of Iska | Blue Note |
| 1971 | Joe Zawinul | Zawinul | Atlantic |
| 1972 | Norman Connors | Dance of Magic | Cobblestone |
| 1972 | Miles Davis | On the Corner | Columbia |
| 1972 [1974] | Miles Davis | Big Fun (material from On the Corner sessions) | Columbia |
| 1972 | Hal Galper | Wild Bird | Mainstream |
| 1972 | Herbie Hancock | Crossings | Warner Bros. |
| 1972 | James Mtume with the Mtume Umoja Ensemble | Alkebu-Lan – Land of the Blacks (Live at The East) | Strata-East |
| 1972 | Pharoah Sanders | Black Unity | Impulse! |
| 1972 | Buddy Terry | Pure Dynamite | Mainstream |
| 1972 | Pete Yellin | Dance of Allegra | Mainstream |
| 1973 | Catalyst | Perception | Muse |
| 1973 | Charles Earland | The Dynamite Brothers (O.S.T.) | Prestige |
| 1973 | Herbie Hancock | Sextant | Columbia |
| 1973 | Eddie Henderson | Realization | Capricorn |
| 1973 | Marc Levin Ensemble | Songs Dances and Prayers | Sweet Dragon |
| 1974 [1976] | Walter Bishop Jr. | Valley Land | Muse |
| 1974 | Catalyst | Unity | Muse |
| 1974 | Carlos Garnett | Black Love | Muse |
| 1974 | Eddie Henderson | Inside Out | Capricorn |
| 1974 | Azar Lawrence | Bridge into the New Age | Prestige |
| 1974 | Bennie Maupin | The Jewel in the Lotus | ECM |
| 1974 | Cecil McBee | Mutima | Strata-East |
| 1974 [1977] | James Mtume | Rebirth Cycle | Third Street |
| 1974 | Hannibal Marvin Peterson and The Sunrise Orchestra | Children of the Fire | Sunrise |
| 1974 | Charles Sullivan | Genesis | Strata-East |
| 1974 | McCoy Tyner | Sama Layuca | Milestone |
| 1975 | Kenny Barron | Lucifer | Muse |
| 1975 | Azar Lawrence | Summer Solstice | Prestige |
| 1975 | Joseph Bonner | Triangle | Whynot |
| 1975 | Joanne Brackeen | Snooze | Choice |
| 1975 | Sonny Fortune | Awakening | Horizon |
| 1975 | Stan Getz | Jazz Jamboree 74, Vol. 2 | Muza |
| 1975 | Stan Getz with João Gilberto | The Best of Two Worlds | Columbia |
| 1975 [1982] | Stan Getz | The Master | Columbia |
| 1975 | Eddie Henderson | Sunburst | Blue Note |
| 1975 | Bob Moses | Bittersuite in the Ozone | Mozown |
| 1975 | Michel Sardaby | Gail | |
| 1975 | Harold Vick | Don't Look Back | Strata-East |
| 1975 | Buster Williams | Pinnacle | Muse |
| 1975 | Stan Getz (one track, a.o.) | Standard School Broadcast "Music Makers": Woodwinds & Reeds | Chevron |
| 1976 [1978] | Joanne Brackeen | Invitation | Freedom |
| 1976 | Hal Galper | Reach Out! | SteepleChase |
| 1976 [2016] | Stan Getz with João Gilberto | Getz/Gilberto '76 | Resonance |
| 1976 | Eddie Henderson | Heritage | Blue Note |
| 1976 | Pat Martino | Exit | Muse |
| 1976 | Charles Sullivan | Re-Entry | Whynot |
| 1976 | Buster Williams | Crystal Reflections | Muse |
| 1977 | Black Renaissance | Body, Mind and Spirit | Baystate |
| 1977 [1979] | Richard Davis | Harvest | Muse |
| 1977 | Stan Getz | Live at Montmartre | SteepleChase |
| 1977 | Stan Getz | Another World | Columbia |
| 1977 | Stan Getz | Mort d'un pourri (O.S.T.) | Melba |
| 1977 | Herbie Hancock | V.S.O.P. | Columbia |
| 1977 | Eddie Jefferson | The Main Man | Inner City |
| 1977 | Andy LaVerne | Another World | SteepleChase |
| 1977 | John Spider Martin | Absolutely | Improv |
| 1977 | Dave McKenna, The Wilbur Little Quartet | Oil & Vinegar | Honeydew |
| 1977 | Niels-Henning Ørsted Pedersen | Trio 1 | SteepleChase |
| 1977 | Niels-Henning Ørsted Pedersen | Trio 2 | SteepleChase |
| 1977 | Doug Raney | Introducing Doug Raney | SteepleChase |
| 1977 | Zbigniew Seifert | Man of the Light | MPS |
| 1977 | John Stowell | Golden Delicious | Inner City |
| 1978 | Pepper Adams | Reflectory | Muse |
| 1978 | Kenny Barron | Innocence | Wolf |
| 1978 | Walter Bishop Jr. | Cubicle | Muse |
| 1978 [1982] | with Walter Bishop, Jr. and George Mraz | The Trio | Progressive |
| 1978 | Hamiet Bluiett | Resolution | Black Saint |
| 1978 | Joanne Brackeen | Tring-a-Ling | Choice |
| 1978 | Arnett Cobb | Arnett Cobb Is Back | Progressive |
| 1978 | Albert Dailey | That Old Feeling | SteepleChase |
| 1978 | Billy Harper | Soran-Bushi, B.H. | Denon |
| 1978 | Buck Hill | This Is Buck Hill | SteepleChase |
| 1978 | Shirley Horn | A Lazy Afternoon | SteepleChase |
| 1978 | Jimmy Knepper with Joe Temperley | Just Friends | Hep |
| 1978 | Hannibal Marvin Peterson | Naima | Eastworld |
| 1978 | Doug Raney | Cuttin' Loose | SteepleChase |
| 1978 | Bobby Watson as Robert Watson | Estimated Time of Arrival | Roulette |
| 1979 | Chico Freeman | Spirit Sensitive | India Navigation |
| 1979 | Mack Goldsbury | Anthropo-Logic | Muse |
| 1979 | Dick Griffin | Now Is the Time | Trident |
| 1979 | Glen Hall | The Book of the Heart | Sonora |
| 1979 | Buck Hill | Scope | SteepleChase |
| 1979 [1982] | Duke Jordan | Thinking of You | SteepleChase |
| 1979 | Lee Konitz | Yes, Yes, Nonet | SteepleChase |
| 1979 [1984] | Lee Konitz | Live at Laren | Soul Note |
| 1979 | Jim McNeely | The Plot Thickens | Gatemouth |
| 1979 | John McNeil Quintet | Faun | SteepleChase |
| 1979 | John McNeil & Tom Harrell | Look to the Sky | SteepleChase |
| 1979 | Cam Newton | The Motive Behind the Smile | Inner City |
| 1979 | Niels-Henning Ørsted Pedersen Quartet | Dancing on the Tables | SteepleChase |
| 1979 | Doug Raney with Jimmy Raney | Stolen Moments | SteepleChase |
| 1979 | Jimmy Rowles | Paws That Refresh | Choice |
| 1979 | John Scofield | Who's Who? | Arista |
| 1979 | Louis Smith Quintet | Prancin' | SteepleChase |
| 1979 | with Clark Terry, Johnny Hartman, Oscar Peterson, Victor Sproles and Chris Woods | Ain't Misbehavin' | Pablo |
| 1979 | Buster Williams | Heartbeat | Muse |
| 1980 | Pierre Dørge Quartet | Ballad Round the Left Corner | SteepleChase |
| 1980 | Teddy Edwards | Out of This World | SteepleChase |
| 1980 | Chico Freeman | Peaceful Heart, Gentle Spirit | Contemporary |
| 1980 | Duke Jordan | Change a Pace | SteepleChase |
| 1980 | Mingus Dynasty | Live at Montreux | Atlantic |
| 1980 | Doug Raney | Listen | SteepleChase |
| 1980 | Mickey Tucker | The Crawl | Muse |
| 1980 | Tom Varner | Tom Varner Quartet | Soul Note |
| 1980 | Buster Williams | Dreams Come True | Buddah |
| 1981 | Pepper Adams | Urban Dreams | Palo Alto |
| 1981 | Franco Ambrosetti | Heartbop | Enja |
| 1981 | Hamiet Bluiett | Dangerously Suite | Soul Note |
| 1981 [1983] | Buck Hill | Impressions | SteepleChase |
| 1981 | Terumasa Hino | Double Rainbow | CBS/Sony |
| 1981 | Joachim Kühn | Nightline New York | Sandra Music |
| 1981 | Mingus Dynasty | Live at Montreux | Atlantic |
| 1981 | Dave Schnitter | Glowing | Muse |
| 1982 | Johnny Coles | New Morning | Criss Cross Jazz |
| 1982 | Art Farmer Quartet | A Work of Art | Concord Jazz |
| 1982 | Chico Freeman | Tradition in Transition | Elektra Musician |
| 1982 | Stan Getz | Pure Getz | Concord Jazz |
| 1982 [1995] | Stan Getz | Blue Skies | Concord Jazz |
| 1982 | Buck Hill | Easy to Love | SteepleChase |
| 1982 | Jay Hoggard | Mystic Winds, Tropic Breezes | India Navigation |
| 1982 [1986] | Jimmy Knepper | 1st Place | BlackHawk |
| 1982 | Arnie Lawrence | Renewal | Palo Alto |
| 1982 | Cecil McBee | Flying Out | India Navigation |
| 1983 [1991] | with Stanley Cowell, Billy Harper and Reggie Workman | Such Great Friends | Strata-East |
| 1983 | Chico Freeman | The Search | India Navigation |
| 1983 | James Newton | James Newton | Gramavision |
| 1983 | The Jazztet | Nostalgia | Baystate |
| 1983 | Tom Varner | Motion/Stillness | Soul Note |
| 1984 | Larry Coryell | Comin' Home | Muse |
| 1984 | Chico Freeman feat. Bobby McFerrin | Tangents | Elektra Musician |
| 1984 | Kip Hanranhan | Conjure – Music for the Texts of Ishmael Reed | American Clavé |
| 1984 | Jimmy Knepper | I Dream Too Much | Soul Note |
| 1984 | James Newton | Luella | Gramavision |
| 1985 [1988] | Pepper Adams | The Adams Effect | Uptown |
| 1985 | Paul Bley | My Standard | SteepleChase |
| 1985 | Larry Coryell | Equipoise | Muse |
| 1985 | Johnny Dyani Quartet | Angolian Cry | SteepleChase |
| 1985 [1988] | Duke Jordan | Time on My Hands | SteeplChase |
| 1985 [1989] | Duke Jordan | As Time Goes By | SteepleChase |
| 1985 | Didier Lockwood | Out of the Blue | Gramavision |
| 1985 | James Newton | The African Flower – The Music of Duke Ellington and Billy Strayhorn | Blue Note |
| 1985 | Big Nick Nicholas | Big Nick | India Navigation |
| 1985 | Doug Raney | Guitar Guitar Guitar | SteepleChase |
| 1985 | Idrees Sulieman | Groovin' | SteepleChase |
| 1986 | Miles Davis | Tutu | Warner Bros. |
| 1986 [1991] | Shirley Horn Trio | Violets for Your Furs | SteepleChase |
| 1987 | with Tal Farlow, John Abercrombie, Larry Carlton, Larry Coryell, John Scofield and John Patitucci | All Strings Attached | Verve |
| 1987 | Khan Jamal | Thinking of You | Storyville |
| 1987 | Ralph Moore | 623 C Street | Criss Cross Jazz |
| 1987 | with Quest | II | Storyville |
| 1987 | with Quest | Midpoint – Quest III Live at the Montmartre Copenhagen Denmark | Storyville |
| 1988 | Gary Bartz Quartet | Monsoon | SteepleChase |
| 1988 | John Handy | Excursion in Blue | Quartet |
| 1988 | Tom Harrell | Stories (1991 reissue as Visions) | Contemporary |
| 1988 | Duke Jordan Trio | Time on My Hands | SteepleChase |
| 1988 | Mingus Dynasty | Live at the Theatre Boulogne-Billancourt/Paris, Vol. 1 | Soul Note |
| 1988 | Mingus Dynasty | Live at the Theatre Boulogne-Billancourt/Paris, Vol. 2 | Soul Note |
| 1988 | with Quest | N.Y. Nites – Standards | PAN Music |
| 1988 | with Quest | Natural Selection | Pathfinder/Core |
| 1988 | Doug Raney | Something's Up | SteepleChase |
| 1989 | Paul Bley Trio | The Nearness of You | SteepleChase |
| 1989 | with Klaus Ignatzek and Ron McClure | Take It Easy | Nuovo |
| 1989 | Judy Niemack | Long as You're Living | Freelance |
| 1990 | Joey DeFrancesco | Where Were You? | Columbia |
| 1990 | Lars Møller Quartet | Pyramid | Stunt |
| 1990 | with Quest | Of One Mind | CMP |
| 1991 | Joanne Brackeen | Is It Really True | Konnex |
| 1991 | Shirley Horn | You Won't Forget Me | Verve |
| 1991 | James Newton/David Murray | David Murray/James Newton Quintet | DIW |
| 1992 | Sonny Fortune | It Ain't What It Was | Konnex |
| 1992 | with the Western Jazz Quartet (Trent Kynaston, Steve Zegree and Tom Knific) | Firebird | Western Michigan University School Of Music Recordings |
| 1992 | Jarmo Savolainen | First Sight | Timeless |
| 1993 | with Santi Debriano and Arthur Blythe | 3–Ology | Konnex |
| 1993 | Charles Lloyd | The Call | ECM |
| 1993 | Karlheinz Miklin Quartet (with Fritz Pauer and Ron McClure) | Decisions | SOS-Music |
| 1993 | Warren Vaché | Horn of Plenty | Muse |
| 1994 | with Jerry Bergonzi, Mike Stern, Andy LaVerne and George Mraz | Vertical Reality | Musidisc |
| 1994 | George Cables | Quiet Fire | SteepleChase |
| 1994 | Stanley Cowell | Setup | SteepleChase |
| 1994 | Sonny Fortune | Four in One | Blue Note |
| 1994 | Dick Griffin | The Eighth Wonder & More | Konnex |
| 1994 | with David Liebman and Cecil McBee | The Seasons | Soul Note |
| 1994 | Charles Lloyd | All My Relations | ECM |
| 1994 | Joe Lovano | Quartets: Live at the Village Vanguard | Blue Note |
| 1994 | Judy Niemack | Night and the Music | Freelance |
| 1994 | Grover Washington, Jr. | All My Tomorrows | Columbia |
| 1995 | Sonny Fortune | A Better Understanding | Blue Note |
| 1995 | Shirley Horn | The Main Ingredient | Verve |
| 1995 | Cæcilie Norby | Cæcilie Norby | Blue Note |
| 1995 | Jarmo Savolainen | True Image | A-Records |
| 1996 | George Cables | Dark Side, Light Side | SteepleChase |
| 1996 | Ray Drummond | Vignettes | Arabesque |
| 1996 | Jon Jang Sextet | Two Flowers on a Stem | Soul Note |
| 1996 | Lee Konitz | It's You | SteepleChase |
| 1996 | Charles Lloyd | Canto | ECM |
| 1996 | Chris Potter | Moving In | Concord |
| 1997 | Nick Brignola | Poinciana | Reservoir |
| 1997 [1999] | Ray Drummond | 1-2-3-4 | Arabesque |
| 1997 | Horace Tapscott | Thoughts of Dar es Salaam | Arabesque |
| 1997 | Valery Ponomarev | A Star for You | Reservoir |
| 1998 | Dave Douglas | Moving Portrait | DIW |
| 1999 | Kenny Barron | Spirit Song | Verve |
| 1999 | with Doug Raney and Joey DeFrancesco | The Backbeat | SteepleChase |
| 2001 | Pat Martino | Live at Yoshi's | Blue Note |
| 2001 [2002] | Curtis Lundy | Purpose | Justin Time |
| 2002 | Charles Lloyd | Lift Every Voice | ECM |
| 2002 [2005] | Frank Morgan | Raising the Standard | HighNote |
| 2003 | Hilde Vanhove | Insense | Gandharva |
| 2003 | Karlheinz Miklin and Ron McClure | from here to there | TCB Records |
| 2003 [2007] | Frank Morgan | A Night in the Life | HighNote |
| 2004 | Frank Morgan | City Nights: Live at the Jazz Standard | HighNote |
| 2004 | Karlheinz Miklin and Ron McClure | In Between | Extraplatte |
| 2005 | with Mark O'Leary and Tomasz Stanko | Levitation | Leo |
| 2006 | Frank Morgan | Reflections | HighNote |
| 2006 | The Leaders | Spirits Alike | Double Moon |
| 2007 | with David Liebman, Richie Beirach and Ron McClure | Redemption | hatOLOGY |
| 2007 | with Quest | Re-Dial (Live in Hamburg) | Outnote |
| 2008 | Benny Powell | Nextep | Origin |
| 2010 | Jean-Michel Pilc | True Story | Disques Dreyfus |
| 2011 | Brian Landrus Quartet | Traverse | Blueland |
| 2011 | with Quest | Circular Dreaming | Enja |
| 2011 | Iñaki Sandoval | Miracielos | Bebyne |
| 2011 | Johannes Enders | Billy Rubin | Enja |
| 2011 | Tied & Tickled Trio | La Place Demon | Morr |
| 2012 | Karlheinz Miklin and Heiri Känzig | Cymbal Symbols | TCB Music |
| 2012 | Odean Pope | Odean's Three | In+Out |
| 2014 | Tisziji Munoz | Heart Trance Revelation | Anami |
| 2014 | Yelena Eckemoff feat. Mark Turner, Joe Locke & George Mraz | A Touch of Radiance | L & H |
| 2014 | with Bobby Hutcherson, David Sanborn, Joey DeFrancesco | Enjoy the View | Blue Note |
| 2015 | Karlheinz Miklin and Heiri Känzig | Encore | TCB Records |
| 2015 | Yelena Eckemoff feat. Arild Andersen | Lions | L & H |
| 2015 | John Raymond, Dan Tepfer, Joe Martin | Foreign Territory | Fresh Sound |
| 2015 | Aaron Parks feat. Ben Street | Find The Way | ECM |
| 2016 | Yelena Eckemoff feat. Mark Feldman & Ben Street | Leaving Everything Behind | L & H |
| 2016 | Marcos Varela | San Ygnacio | Origin |
| 2017 | with Robin Verheyen, Marc Copland, Drew Gress | When the Birds Leave | Universal Music Belgium |
| 2019 | Joey DeFranceso | In the Key of the Universe | Mack Avenue |
| 2019 | Bruno Ruder & Rémi Dumoulin | Gravitational Waves | Association Du Hajeton |
| 2026 | Carmen Quill | I'll Be Thinking of You on Thursday | Close Up |
