= All Our Reasons =

Studio album by Billy Hart
- Released: March 16, 2012
- Recorded: June 2011
- Studio: Avatar, New York City
- Genre: Jazz
- Length: 59:31
- Label: ECM; ECM 2248
- Producer: Manfred Eicher

Billy Hart chronology
Sixty-Eight (2011)	All Our Reasons (2012)	One Is the Other (2014)

All Our Reasons is a jazz album by drummer Billy Hart, recorded in June 2011 and released on ECM in March the following year.

== Reception ==
Professional ratings
Review scores
Source	Rating
AllMusic	4/5 stars
The Guardian	4/5 stars

The AllMusic review by Thom Jurek states "All Our Reasons is wonderfully executed, and full of excellent tunes, nice improvisational turns, numerous surprises (many of them subtle), and a warm, lively sense of engagement throughout." The Guardian's John Fordham noted "It's an A-list lineup, but focused on making unique music rather than parading technicalities." Michael J. West wrote in JazzTimes that "nine sublime, ruminative tracks that are as stark and atmospheric as the cover photograph... All Our Reasons is a splendid recording."

== Track listing ==
All compositions by Billy Hart, except where noted

1. "Song for Balkis" – 12:53
2. "Ohnedaruth" (Iverson, based on "Giant Steps") – 6:05
3. "Tolli's Dance" – 5:31
4. "Nostalgia for the Impossible" (Iverson) – 5:53
5. "Duchess" – 6:33
6. "Nigeria" (Turner) – 7:54
7. "Wasteland" (Turner) – 7:12
8. "Old Wood" (Iverson) – 1:42
9. "Imke's March" – 5:48

== Personnel ==
- Billy Hart – drums
- Mark Turner – tenor sax
- Ethan Iverson – piano
- Ben Street – double bass
