= Tom Varner Quartet =

Studio album by Tom Varner
- Released: 1980
- Recorded: August 29, 1980
- Genre: Jazz
- Length: 44:16
- Label: Soul Note
- Producer: Tom Varner

Tom Varner chronology
Tom Varner Quartet (1980)	Motion/Stillness (1983)

Tom Varner Quartet is the debut album by American jazz French horn player and composer Tom Varner, recorded in 1980 and released on the Italian Soul Note label.

== Reception ==
Professional ratings
Review scores
Source	Rating
AllMusic	4.5/5 stars
The Penguin Guide to Jazz Recordings	3/4 stars

The AllMusic review by Ron Wynn stated: "Tom Varner turned heads and opened eyes on the jazz scene in the early '80s. There weren't, and still aren't, many French horn players who improvise and play with the facility he demonstrated on this 1980 session".

The authors of The Penguin Guide to Jazz Recordings wrote that the album "depend[s] on satisfying solos to make a modest impact."

A reviewer for Billboard noted that the album "establishes Varner near the very top of the admittedly brief list of players committed to venturing into jazz with this symphonic instrument," and commented: "What distinguishes Varner is both his compositional focus... and astonishing technique. Rapid flurries of notes and raucous slurs may be routine on other brass horns, but on this instrument those effects represent obvious care."

== Track listing ==
All compositions written and arranged by Tom Varner

1. "The Otter" - 7:43
2. "Radiator" - 8:26
3. "12 12" - 7:39
4. "TV TV" - 10:05
5. "Heaps" - 10:28

- Recorded at Sorcerer Sound in New York City on August 29, 1980

- Cover photo by Vittorio Sacco, back photos by Lee Snider and Carlo Verri

== Personnel ==
- Tom Varner - French horn
- Ed Jackson - alto saxophone
- Fred Hopkins - bass
- Billy Hart - drums
