= Songs of the Unsung =

Solo album by Horace Tapscott

Studio album by Horace Tapscott
- Released: 1978
- Recorded: February 18, 1978 at United Western Recorders in Hollywood, California
- Genre: Jazz
- Label: Interplay; IP-7714
- Producer: Horace Tapscott and Toshiya Taenaka

Horace Tapscott chronology
The Giant is Awakened (1969)	Songs of the Unsung (1978)	In New York (1979)

Songs of the Unsung is a solo album by American jazz pianist/composer Horace Tapscott recorded in 1978 and released on the Interplay label.

== Reception ==
Professional ratings
Review scores
Source	Rating
AllMusic	4/5 stars

AllMusic awarded the album 4 stars with its review by Scott Yanow calling it "A fine outing that, if it were in-print, could serve as a fairly accessible introduction to the masterful pianist".

DownBeat assigned the album 4 stars.

== Track listing ==
All compositions by Horace Tapscott except as indicated

1. "Song of the Unsung" - 3:39
2. "Blue Essence" (Samuel R. Browne) - 3:51
3. "Bakai" (Cal Massey) - 5:55
4. "In Times Like These" (Lester Robinson) - 7:01
5. "Mary on Sunday" - 3:22
6. "Lush Life" (Billy Strayhorn) - 6:34
7. "The Goat and Ram Jam" (Jesse Sharps) - 5:01
8. "Something for Kenny" (Elmo Hope) - 5:58

== Personnel ==
- Horace Tapscott - piano
