= Enchance =

Studio album by Billy Hart
- Released: 1977
- Recorded: February 24 and March 3, 1977
- Studio: Generation Sound Studio, New York City
- Genre: Jazz
- Length: 45:59
- Label: Horizon; SP-725
- Producer: Elliot Meadow

Billy Hart chronology
Enchance (1977)	Oshumare (1985)

Enchance is an album by American jazz drummer Billy Hart recorded in 1977 and released on the Horizon label.

== Reception ==
Professional ratings
Review scores
Source	Rating
AllMusic	5/5 stars

The Allmusic review by Eugene Chadbourne states, "The album actually seems to be something like the essence of so many enjoyable directions in improvised music during this period, and is full of the excitement such activity is known for when the action on the bandstand is at its best".

== Track listing ==
1. "Diff Customs" (Oliver Lake) - 5:44
2. "Shadow Dance"" (Dave Holland) - 7:43
3. "Layla-Joy" (Billy Hart) - 6:55
4. "Corner Culture" (Dewey Redman) - 2:47
5. "Rahsaan is Beautiful" (Hannibal Marvin Peterson) - 4:31
6. "Pharoah" (Don Pullen) - 9:31
7. "Hymn for the Old Year" (Lake) - 8:48

== Personnel ==
- Billy Hart - drums, percussion
- Oliver Lake - alto saxophone, soprano saxophone, flute
- Dewey Redman - tenor saxophone (tracks 1–4, 6 & 7)
- Hannibal Marvin Peterson - trumpet, koto
- Eddie Henderson - trumpet, flugelhorn (tracks 1,3 & 5)
- Don Pullen - piano, electric piano
- Mark Gray - piano, electric piano
- Dave Holland (tracks 2, 4, 6 & 7), Buster Williams (tracks 1, 3 & 5) - bass
- Michael Carvin - percussion (track 5)
