= Billy Hart Quartet =

Studio album by Billy Hart
- Released: August 1, 2006
- Recorded: October 14 & 15, 2005
- Studio: Ambient Recording, Easton, Connecticut
- Genre: Jazz
- Length: 66:59
- Label: HighNote; HCD 7158
- Producer: The Fiesta

Billy Hart chronology
Oceans of Time (1997)	Billy Hart Quartet (2006)	Route F (2006)

Billy Hart Quartet is an album by American jazz drummer Billy Hart recorded in 2005 and released on the HighNote label.

== Reception ==
Professional ratings
Review scores
Source	Rating
AllMusic	4/5 stars
All About Jazz	4/5 stars
The Penguin Guide to Jazz Recordings	3.5/4 stars

AllMusic awarded the album 4 stars with its review by Ken Dryden stating, "Since this was a working band for some time prior to the making of Quartet, the musicians were already of one mind, rather than being thrown together and trying to make something out of brand new, unfamiliar charts. ...The interplay between the four men and the intensity of their individual solos leave no doubt that this quartet has earned a return trip to the studio for a follow-up session". All About Jazz's John Kelman said "Quartet may be a mainstream record, but it's a wholly modernistic one where Hart's group approaches the middle from a decidedly left-of-center point of view."

== Track listing ==
All compositions by Billy Hart except as indicated

1. "Mellow B" (Ethan Iverson) - 9:47
2. "Moment's Notice" (John Coltrane) - 4:31
3. "Charvez" - 7:34
4. "Confirmation" (Charlie Parker) - 7:32
5. "Lorca" - 8:42
6. "Irah" - 5:31
7. "Lullaby for Imke" - 6:10
8. "Iverson's Odyssey" (Mark Turner) - 8:19
9. "Neon" (Iverson) - 8:53

== Personnel ==
- Billy Hart - drums
- Mark Turner - tenor saxophone
- Ethan Iverson - piano
- Ben Street - bass
