= Trent Kynaston =

American jazz musician

Trent Kynaston, born December 7, 1946 (age 79) in Tucson, Arizona, is an American jazz and classical saxophonist, music educator, and composer and has performed throughout the United States, Canada, Europe, Central America, South America, Africa, and Asia.

== Biography ==
Kynaston is Professor Emeritus of Music at Western Michigan University where he recently retired after 39 years of teaching. During his tenure he was the recipient of Down Beat magazine's Achievement Award for Jazz Education, the College of Fine Arts Outstanding Service Award, the Dean's Outstanding Teaching Award, and the Western Michigan University Distinguished Teaching Award. In 2008 he was recognized as WMU "Professor of the Year."

He holds degrees from the University of Arizona in Tucson and the coveted gold Medaille d'Honeur in saxophone and chamber music from the Conservatoire National de Musique de Bordeaux, France. He started the WMU Jazz Orchestra in 1974 and directed the band for 30 years. The award-winning ensemble received national acclaim for its high performance standards and creative approach to big band jazz. Recognitions include two-time winner of the college big band category of Down Beat Magazine's annual DB student music awards, a heralded performance in New York City’s Carnegie Hall, thirteen consecutive performances at the Montreux-Detroit International Jazz Festival, 25 consecutive Outstanding Band recognitions at the Notre Dame Collegiate Jazz Festival, and performances at several IAJE International Conferences. The ensemble's CD's, Spritely Overdue (1996), Disposable Income (1997), Blue Miles (1998), Sweet Tango (1999), Cosmosis (2002), and Boogaloo Land (2005), received rave reviews and were all released on Sea Breeze Jazz Vista Recordings.

He has published numerous compositions, books and articles on various aspects of music, and is recognized world-wide for his jazz solo transcription books. He has performed and toured with such notable jazz artists as Art Farmer, Red Rodney, Billy Hart, Bobby Shew, Mark Murphy, Marvin Stamm, Kenny Werner, and Randy Brecker. His recordings with the Western Jazz Quartet (which he formed in 1974) include Live at the Akwarium Jazz Club (Warsaw, Poland) on Koch Jazz International #3-3811-1, Firebird (1993) on SMR-9301 (listed in the January 2000 issue of Down Beat Magazine as one of the best CD's of the 90's), Blue Harts (1995) on SMR-9501, Sabine's Dance (2000) on Sea Breeze Jazz -SBJ 3040 (all featuring Billy Hart), Turtles (1997) on Polonia CD 068, with Randy Brecker, The Waning Moon (1999) on Mercury, and Mayan Myths (2006) on Sea Breeze Jazz SBJ 3079.
