= Rah (Billy Hart album) =

Studio album by Billy Hart
- Released: 1988
- Recorded: September 1987 at A&R Recording, NYC
- Genre: Jazz
- Length: 50:29
- Label: Gramavision; 18-8802-1
- Producer: Jonathan F.P. Rose

Billy Hart chronology
Oshumare (1985)	Rah (1988)	Amethyst (1993)

Rah is an album by American jazz drummer Billy Hart recorded in 1987 and released on the Gramavision label.

== Reception ==
The Allmusic review by Michael G. Nastos awarded the album 3 stars stating "Excellent original compositions. This is very listenable, time after time. Many great soloists and ensemble players. Highly recommended".

Professional ratings
Review scores
Source	Rating
Allmusic	3/5 stars

== Track listing ==
All compositions by Billy Hart except as indicated

1. "Motional" (Mark Grey, Billy Hart) - 4:48
2. "Reflections" (Kevin Eubanks) - 6:08
3. "Naaj" - 7:13
4. "Breakup" (Bill Frisell) - 5:11
5. "Reneda" - 5:53
6. "Reminder" (Frisell) - 6:23
7. "Dreams" (Eddie Henderson) - 7:08
8. "Junque" (David Liebman) - 7:45

== Personnel ==
- Billy Hart - drums
- Dave Liebman - soprano saxophone
- Caris Visentin - oboe (track 8)
- Eddie Henderson - flugelhorn
- Ralph Moore - tenor saxophone (tracks 1 & 3–7)
- Kevin Eubanks (tracks 1–3, 6 & 7), Bill Frisell (tracks 1 & 3–8) - guitar
- Mark Gray - synthesizer (tracks 1–3, 5 & 8)
- Kenny Kirkland - piano
- Eddie Gómez (tracks 1, 4, 6 & 8), Buster Williams (tracks 2, 3, 5 & 7) - bass
