= Thoughts of Dar es Salaam =

Studio album by Horace Tapscott
- Released: 1997
- Recorded: June 30 & July 1, 1996 at Eastside Sound, NYC
- Genre: Jazz
- Length: 59:40
- Label: Arabesque; AJ0128
- Producer: Ray Drummond and Daniel Chriss

Horace Tapscott chronology
Aiee! The Phantom (1996)	Thoughts of Dar es Salaam (1997)

Thoughts of Dar es Salaam is an album by the American jazz pianist/composer Horace Tapscott, recorded in 1996 and released on the Arabesque label.

== Reception ==
Professional ratings
Review scores
Source	Rating
AllMusic	4.5/5 stars
The Penguin Guide to Jazz Recordings	3.5/4 stars

The AllMusic review by Thom Jurek stated: "The final album by West Coast pianist and composer Horace Tapscott is one of sublime gentility, reaching harmonic elegance and meditative grace".

== Track listing ==
All compositions by Horace Tapscott except as indicated

1. "As a Child" - 7:06
2. "Bibi Mkuu: The Great Black Lady" (Alan Hines) - 5:34
3. "Lullaby in Black" (Thurman Green) - 3:19
4. "Sandy and Niles" - 4:44
5. "Wiletta's Walk" - 9:08
6. "Social Call" (Gigi Gryce) - 8:53
7. "Oleo" (Sonny Rollins) - 8:07
8. "Thoughts of Dar Es Salaam" - 6:50
9. "Now's the Time" (Charlie Parker) - 5:59

== Personnel ==
- Horace Tapscott - piano
- Ray Drummond - bass
- Billy Hart - drums
