= The Giant Is Awakened =

The Giant is Awakened

Studio album by Horace Tapscott Quintet
- Released: 1969
- Recorded: April 1–3, 1969
- Genre: Jazz
- Length: 38:39
- Label: Flying Dutchman; FDS 107
- Producer: Bob Thiele

Horace Tapscott chronology
The Giant is Awakened (1969)	Songs of the Unsung (1978)

The Giant is Awakened is the debut album by American jazz pianist/composer Horace Tapscott recorded in 1969 and released on the Flying Dutchman label.

== Reception ==
Professional ratings
Review scores
Source	Rating
AllMusic	4.5/5 stars
DownBeat	5/5 stars

AllMusic awarded the album 4½ stars. The Chicago Reader noted "Tapscott was leery of the music business in general, and of this deal in particular—and considering a promise that he'd be involved in the mixing process was subsequently broken, his skepticism was prescient. He didn't record again for another decade, and then only for small independents like Nimbus and Interplay. In any case, as listeners, we should be grateful Tapscott agreed to make The Giant at all".

Lloyd Sachs, writing for DownBeat, called the album "A sometimes hypnotic, sometimes starkly expressive reflection of those fractious times," and commented: "With its swooshing effects and two bassists... the album is ahead of its time. To the great disappointment of those who thrilled at this music, Tapscott didn't make another recording for 10 years. But Giant is as enrapturing now as it was then."

== Track listing ==
All compositions by Horace Tapscott except as noted

1. "The Giant Is Awakened" - 17:23
2. "For Fats" (Arthur Blythe) - 2:20
3. "The Dark Tree" - 7:01
4. "Niger's Theme" - 11:55

== Personnel ==
- Horace Tapscott - piano
- Arthur Blythe - alto saxophone
- David Bryant, Walter Savage Jr. - bass
- Everett Brown Jr. - drums
