= The Complete Imperial Sessions =

Compilation album by Lou Blackburn
- Released: 2006
- Recorded: January 25 & 31 and March 12 & 18, 1963 at United Recorders in Los Angeles, California
- Genre: Jazz
- Length: 80:19
- Label: Blue Note; 58293
- Producer: Michael Cuscuna

The Complete Imperial Sessions is a CD compilation of the two albums led by American jazz trombonist/composer Lou Blackburn, Jazz Frontier and Two Note Samba, which were recorded in 1963 and originally released on the Imperial label. The albums contain the first recordings of pianist Horace Tapscott.

== Reception ==
Professional ratings
Review scores
Source	Rating
AllMusic	4.5/5 stars
All Abou Jazz	4/5 stars

AllMusic reviewer Ken Dryden stated: "The musicianship throughout these dates is exemplary and it is a shame that the short-lived quintet didn't achieve greater recognition. Even bop fans who are not at all familiar with Lou Blackburn will enjoy this collection of his early work as a leader". All About Jazz correspondent, Mike Keely said "The Complete Imperial Sessions presents a tight West Coast band with a bluesy East Coast sound. There is the best of both worlds in this fine quintet with its well-balanced soloists and outstanding rhythm section. Blackburn is a sharp band leader whose sophistication is evident throughout these sessions; he brings to the table eleven original compositions and a band that can turn on a dime".

== Track listing ==
All compositions by Lou Blackburn except as indicated

1. "New Frontier" - 4:37
2. "Perception" - 5:29
3. "I Cover the Waterfront" (Edward Heyman, Johnny Green) - 3:05
4. "17 Richmond Park" - 5:07
5. "Harlem Bossa Nova" - 3:28
6. "Luze Blues" - 3:11
7. "The Clan" (Curtis Fuller) - 2:56
8. "Scorpio" - 4:26
9. "Jazz-a-Nova" - 3:46
10. "Stella by Starlight" (Ned Washington, Victor Young) - 3:52
11. "Manhã de Carnaval" (Luiz Bonfá, Antônio Maria) - 5:53
12. "Jean-Bleu" - 4:43
13. "Blues for Eurydice" - 4:45
14. "Secret Love" (Paul Francis Webster, Sammy Fain) - 3:18
15. "Two-Note Samba" - 4:09
16. "Grand Prix" - 3:49
17. "Song of Delilah" (Ray Evans, Jay Livingston, Victor Young) - 4:52
18. "Dear Old Stockholm" (Traditional) - 4:43
19. "Ode to Taras" - 4:52 Bonus track not on original albums
- Recorded on January 25 (tracks 1–5), January 31 (tracks 6–11), March 12 (tracks 12–15 & 19) and March 18 (tracks 16–18), 1963 at United Recorders, Los Angeles, CA. Tracks 1–10 originally issued as Jazz Frontier (Imperial 12228) and tracks 11–18 originally issued as Two Note Samba (Imperial 12242)

== Personnel ==
- Lou Blackburn - trombone
- Freddie Hill - trumpet
- Horace Tapscott - piano
- John Duke - bass
- Leroy Henderson - drums
