= Oceans of Time =

Studio album by Billy Hart
- Released: 1997
- Recorded: August 29 & 30, 1996 at EastSide Sound, NYC
- Genre: Jazz
- Length: 71:42
- Label: Arabesque; AJ0129
- Producer: David Ballou and Billy Hart

Billy Hart chronology
Amethyst (1993)	Oceans of Time (1997)	Billy Hart Quartet (2006)

Oceans of Time is an album by American jazz drummer Billy Hart recorded in 1996 and released on the Arabesque label.

== Reception ==
The Allmusic review by David R. Adler awarded the album 3 stars. JazzTimes' Bill Bennett said "The ensemble concept works from an acoustic foundation, with violin, reeds and guitar layering on timbral and textural range. What Hart seeks, and finds, in his bandmates is that ability to shift gears, to move from inside to outside, to follow his rhythmic cues from the realm of dense, atmospheric arrangements into more direct renderings of the blues sensibility. Hart's inherent lyricism holds it all together, interacting freely with the beat without ever losing the swing factor. This is truly a band worth hearing".

Professional ratings
Review scores
Source	Rating
Allmusic	3/5 stars
The Penguin Guide to Jazz Recordings	4/4 stars

== Track listing ==
All compositions by Billy Hart except as indicated

1. "One for Carter" (John Stubblefield) - 6:50
2. "Téulé's Redemption" - 12:03
3. "Shadow" (Dave Kikoski) - 7:11
4. "Oceans of Time" - 9:30
5. "Tosh" (Chris Potter) - 8:36
6. "Mind Reader" (Santi Debriano) - 10:50
7. "Father Demo Square" (Mark Feldman) - 8:13
8. "Offering" (Debriano) - 8:29

== Personnel ==
- Billy Hart - drums
- Chris Potter - soprano saxophone, tenor saxophone, bass clarinet
- John Stubblefield - tenor saxophone, soprano saxophone
- David Fiuczynski - guitar
- David Kikoski - piano
- Mark Feldman - violin
- Santi Debriano - bass
