= Oshumare (album) =

Studio album by Billy Hart
- Released: 1985
- Recorded: 1985 at Secret Sound, New York City
- Genre: Jazz
- Length: 42:26
- Label: Gramavision; 18-8502-1
- Producer: David Baker & Mark Gray

Billy Hart chronology
| Enchance (1977) | Oshumare (1985) | Rah (1988) |

Oshumare is an album by American jazz drummer Billy Hart recorded in 1985 and released on the Gramavision label.

== Reception ==
Professional ratings
Review scores
| Source | Rating |
|---|---|
| Allmusic | 3/5 stars |

The Allmusic review by Alex Henderson states, "Oshumare makes listeners wish that Hart had recorded more albums as a leader in the 1980s".

== Track listing ==
All compositions by Billy Hart except as indicated

1. "Duchess" - 6:14
2. "Waiting Inside" (Bill Frisell) - 7:46
3. "Chance" (Kenny Kirkland) - 5:54
4. "Lorca" - 7:30
5. "Cosmosis" (Dave Holland) - 4:42
6. "IDGAF Suite" (Kevin Eubanks) - 10:18
7. "May Dance" (Holland) - 6:07 Bonus track on CD
8. "Mad Monkey" (Steve Coleman) - 6:15 Bonus track on CD

== Personnel ==
- Billy Hart - drums
- Steve Coleman - alto saxophone
- Branford Marsalis - tenor saxophone
- Bill Frisell, Kevin Eubanks - electric guitar
- Mark Gray, Kenny Kirkland - keyboards
- Didier Lockwood - violin
- Dave Holland - bass
- Manolo Badrena - percussion
