= One Is the Other =

Studio album by Billy Hart Quartet
- Released: March 4, 2014
- Recorded: April/May 2013
- Studio: Avatar, New York City
- Genre: Jazz
- Length: 51:31
- Label: ECM 2335
- Producer: Manfred Eicher

Billy Hart Quartet chronology
All Our Reasons (2012)	One Is the Other (2014)	Just (2025)

One Is the Other is an album by the Billy Hart Quartet recorded in April and May 2013 and released on ECM March the following year. The quartet features saxophonist Mark Turner, pianist Ethan Iverson, and bassist Ben Street.

== Reception ==
Professional ratings
Review scores
Source	Rating
AllMusic	4/5 stars
The Guardian	4/5 stars
All About Jazz	4.5/5 stars

The AllMusic review by Thom Jurek states "One Is the Other is the sound of an experienced and deeply intuitive quartet speaking in a colorful and precise language composed of numerous dialects and approaches to musical speech."

The Guardian's John Fordham noted "For anyone open to spontaneous musical conversation, regardless of genre, this beautifully crafted album is likely to appeal – but aficionados will probably get more from it, since veteran drum star and former Herbie Hancock sideman Hart and his superb quartet constantly hint at references from all over the jazz tradition."

Steve Greenlee wrote in JazzTimes that "The Billy Hart Quartet gets more laidback with each release. One Is the Other is the group’s third effort (and second on ECM), and it is a demonstrably looser, freer affair than its predecessors. It’s as though the veteran drummer and his younger compadres—tenor saxophonist Mark Turner, pianist Ethan Iverson, bassist Ben Street—decided they’d proven themselves and can now take more risks with their music."

All About Jazz correspondent John Kelman observed "with ECM paying increasing attention to North American musicians—with particular focus on a clearly vibrant New York scene, the sublimely open One Is the Other is both this quartet's best record yet, and further evidence to counter those who accuse ECM's purview of being too Euro-centric."

== Track listing ==
All compositions by Billy Hart, except where noted

1. "Lennie Groove" (Mark Turner) - 6:50
2. "Maraschino" (Ethan Iverson) - 5:51
3. "Teule's Redemption" - 7:21
4. "Amethyst" - 8:06
5. "Yard" - 5:07
6. "Sonnet for Stevie" (Turner) - 8:43
7. "Some Enchanted Evening" (Richard Rodgers, Oscar Hammerstein II) - 5:19
8. "Big Trees" (Iverson) - 4:14

== Personnel ==
=== Billy Hart Quartet ===
- Mark Turner – tenor saxophone
- Ethan Iverson – piano
- Ben Street – double bass
- Billy Hart – drums
