= Motion/Stillness =

Live album by Tom Varner
- Released: 1982
- Recorded: March 19, 1982
- Genre: Jazz
- Length: 71:34
- Label: Soul Note
- Producer: Tom Varner

Tom Varner chronology
Tom Varner Quartet (1980)	Motion/Stillness (1982)	Jazz French Horn (1983)

Motion/Stillness is the second album by American jazz French horn player and composer Tom Varner recorded in 1982 and released on the Italian Soul Note label.

== Reception ==
Professional ratings
Review scores
Source	Rating
AllMusic	4/5 stars
The Penguin Guide to Jazz Recordings	3/4 stars

The AllMusic review by Ken Dryden awarded the album 4 stars and stated, "This 1982 concert features Varner leading an explosive quartet... Highly recommended!".

The authors of the Penguin Guide to Jazz Recordings wrote that the album "depend[s] on satisfying solos to make a modest impact."

== Track listing ==
All compositions by Tom Varner except as indicated

1. "Subway Awakening" - 11:22
2. "Study No. 1" - 10:03
3. "Neutron Bomb Shuffle" - 4:59
4. "New Moonshiner" - 13:46
5. "Freddy Did It" - 3:26
6. "Indian Summer" (Victor Herbert, Al Dubin) - 9:37 Bonus track on CD
7. "The Otter" - 10:26 Bonus track on CD
8. "Comme Il Faut" (Ornette Coleman) - 7:55 Bonus track on CD

- Recorded at Inroads in New York City on March 19, 1982

== Personnel ==
- Tom Varner - French horn
- Ed Jackson - alto saxophone
- Ed Schuller - bass
- Billy Hart (tracks 1–5), Adam Nussbaum (tracks 6–8) - drums
- Cover photo by Bernard Rickenbach, back photos by Tiani Osborn
