= Book of Tells =

Studio album by Mark Feldman
- Released: November 15, 2001
- Recorded: May 23, 1998; August 20, 1999
- Studio: DRS Television (Winterthur, Switzerland); System Two (Brooklyn, NY)
- Genre: Contemporary classical music, jazz
- Length: 50:36
- Label: Enja ENJ-9385 2

Mark Feldman chronology
Music for Violin and Piano (1999)	Book of Tells (2001)	What Exit (2006)

Book of Tells (subtitled Five Pieces for String Quartet) is an album by violinist Mark Feldman which was released on the Enja label in 2001.

== Reception ==
Professional ratings
Review scores
Source	Rating
AllMusic	3.5/5 stars

In a review for AllMusic, Blair Sanderson stated that "As versatile a composer as he is a performer and recording artist, Mark Feldman demonstrates extraordinary skills and a wide range of expressions in Book of Tells".

== Track listing ==
All compositions by Mark Feldman except as indicated

1. "Windsor Quartet" - 15:14
2. "Kit Suite (Kit / Les Tenebrides / Murmur)" (Feldman/Sylvie Courvoisier/Feldman) - 10:54
3. "Xanax" - 4:53
4. "Book Of Tells" - 10:59
5. "Real Joe" - 8:09

== Personnel ==
- Mark Feldman - violin
- Erik Friedlander - cello
- Joyce Hammann - violin (track 1), viola (tracks 2–5)
- Cenovia Cummins - violin (tracks 2–5)
- Lois Martin - viola (track 1)
