= Aiee! The Phantom =

1995 jazz album by Horace Tapscott

Studio album by Horace Tapscott
- Released: 1996
- Recorded: June 1995
- Studio: Systems Two Recording Studios, Brooklyn, NY
- Genre: Jazz
- Length: 59:21
- Label: Arabesque; AJ0119
- Producer: Adam Abeshouse and Daniel Chriss

Horace Tapscott chronology
The Dark Tree (1989)	Aiee! The Phantom (1996)	Thoughts of Dar es Salaam (1997)

Aiee! The Phantom is an album by American jazz pianist/composer Horace Tapscott recorded in 1995 and released on the Arabesque label.

== Reception ==
Professional ratings
Review scores
Source	Rating
AllMusic	4.5/5 stars
The Penguin Guide to Jazz Recordings	3.5/4 stars

AllMusic awarded the album 4½ stars with its review by Scott Yanow stating, "Falling between post bop and the avant-garde, Tapscott plays locally with a blazing (if thus far undocumented) quartet... Perhaps this recording (available from Arabesque) will alert the rest of the jazz world as to the strong talents of the great veteran Horace Tapscott".

== Track listing ==
All compositions by Horace Tapscott except as indicated

1. "To the Great House" - 7:52
2. "The Goat and Ram Jam" (Jesse Sharps) - 8:54
3. "Aiee! The Phantom" - 10:31
4. "Drunken Mary/Mary on Sunday" - 9:30
5. "Inspiration of Silence" (Ernest Straughter) - 6:42
6. "Mothership" - 15:52

== Personnel ==
- Horace Tapscott - piano
- Marcus Belgrave - trumpet
- Abraham Burton - alto saxophone
- Reggie Workman - bass
- Andrew Cyrille - drums
