= Assaf Kehati =

Israeli musical artist

Assaf Kehati אסף קהתי
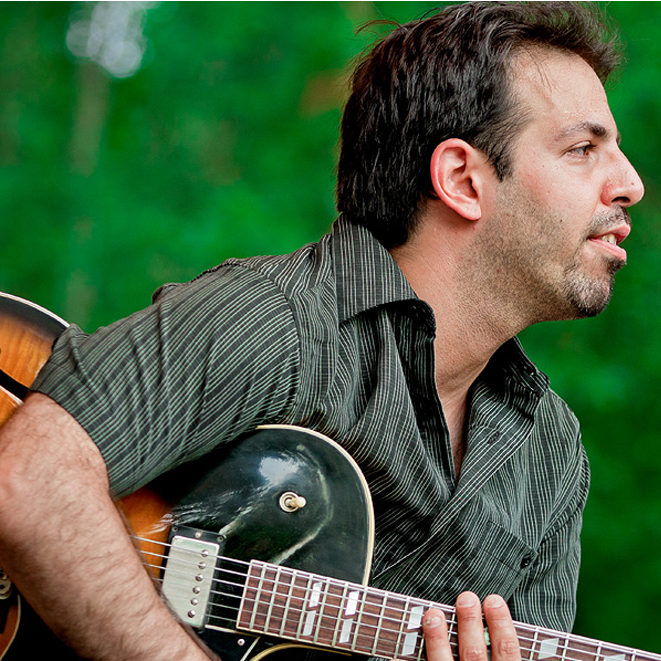

Background information
- Born: October 21, 1979 (age 46)
- Origin: Israel
- Genres: Jazz
- Occupations: guitarist, composer, bandleader, educator
- Instrument: Guitar
- Label: Independent
- Website: http://www.assafkehati.com/

Assaf Kehati (Hebrew: אסף קהתי; born October 21, 1979) is an Israeli jazz guitarist, composer, bandleader and educator based in New York, New York.

== Education ==
Kehati first started playing the piano and guitar at the age of ten and later following with classical violin. His grandmother was a professional pianist who first introduced him to playing an instrument. As a teenager he played rock, pop, and classical music. At age 19, he started to take interest in jazz. Shortly after, he was accepted to Rimon School in Ramat HaSharon. A few months into his jazz studies, he became the winner of a number of local jazz awards, including the third place of “the Jazz Player” national competition in Israel. He also became a member of Rimon Honors Ensemble, “Hot Jazz”, which featured famous Australian jazz fusion guitarist, Frank Gambale.

In 2007, he moved to Boston to pursue his graduate studies at the New England Conservatory. There he has also worked as an assistant professor after receiving his Masters in Jazz Performance in 2009.

== Career ==
While in Israel, Kehati performed with many prominent musicians including Alon Farber, Shai Chen, Haggai Amir, Udi Shlomo, and Daniel Sapir. He appeared at the Tel Aviv Jazz Festival, Channel 22 TV, Shablul Jazz Club, Machtesh Ramon Jazz Festival and at the Israel National Festival in Jerusalem.

In 2010, Kehati recorded his first album "A View From My Window" and "Flowers And Other Stories" in 2011. In 2014 he released a third album, Naked. His style is said to be influenced by Hector Berlioz, George Gershwin, Pat Metheny, and Kenny Rogers.

Kehati has played and worked with renowned artists such as Ran Blake, George Garzone, Eli Degibri, Donny McCaslin, Seamus Blake, Anat Cohen, and more prominently, with the drummer Billy Hart who has been a part of his trio since 2009.

He has played worldwide in Israel, South America, Russia, Canada, Washington DC, Atlanta, Boston and in the renowned Blue Note Jazz Club in New York City.

== Discography ==
- A View From My Window (2010)
- Flowers and Other Stories (2011)
- Naked (2014)
