= Music for Violin and Piano =

Studio album by Mark Feldman & Sylvie Courvoisier
- Released: June 22, 1999
- Recorded: June 15, 1996 at Zurich DRS and December 23, 1998 at Clinton Studios, New York City
- Genre: Contemporary classical music, jazz
- Length: 65:24
- Label: Avant AVAN 065
- Producer: Mark Feldman & Sylvie Courvoisier

Mark Feldman chronology
Music for Violin Alone (1995)	Music for Violin and Piano (1999)	Book of Tells (2001)

Sylvie Courvoisier chronology
Music for Barrel Organ, Piano, Tuba, Bass and Percussion (1997)	Music for Violin and Piano (1999)	Y2K (2000)

Music for Violin and Piano is an album by violinist Mark Feldman and pianist Sylvie Courvoisier, which was released on the Avant label in 1999.

== Reception ==
Professional ratings
Review scores
Source	Rating
Allmusic	4.5/5 stars

In his review for Allmusic, Mark W.B. Allender notes that "Both Feldman and Courvoisier compliment [sic] each other well as they play in perfect step with one another. Highly recommended".

All About Jazz said "Feldman's playing, crystalline but fluid, evokes an intimate chamber music aesthetic. Courvoisier covers the range from lush chordal progressions to punchy clusters to light prepared-piano tinkles, constantly evolving a florid sense of drama. While the balance of improvisation and composition on this record tilts more toward the latter than usual, it's quite a refreshing change".

== Track listing ==
All compositions by Sylvie Courvoisier & Mark Feldman

1. "Smoke" - 2:57
2. "One Too: Too Romantisch Too / Too Speedy" - 9:15
3. "La Goulante de l'Idiot" - 9:15
4. "Kit: Les Tenebrides / Murmur / Luna Park" - 13:46
5. "Gugging" - 7:35
6. "Dog Town Road" - 3:32
7. "Valse Nise" - 7:30
8. "Terre d'Agala" - 7:34

== Personnel ==
- Mark Feldman - violin
- Sylvie Courvoisier - piano
