= Horace Tapscott =

American jazz pianist and composer (1934–1999)

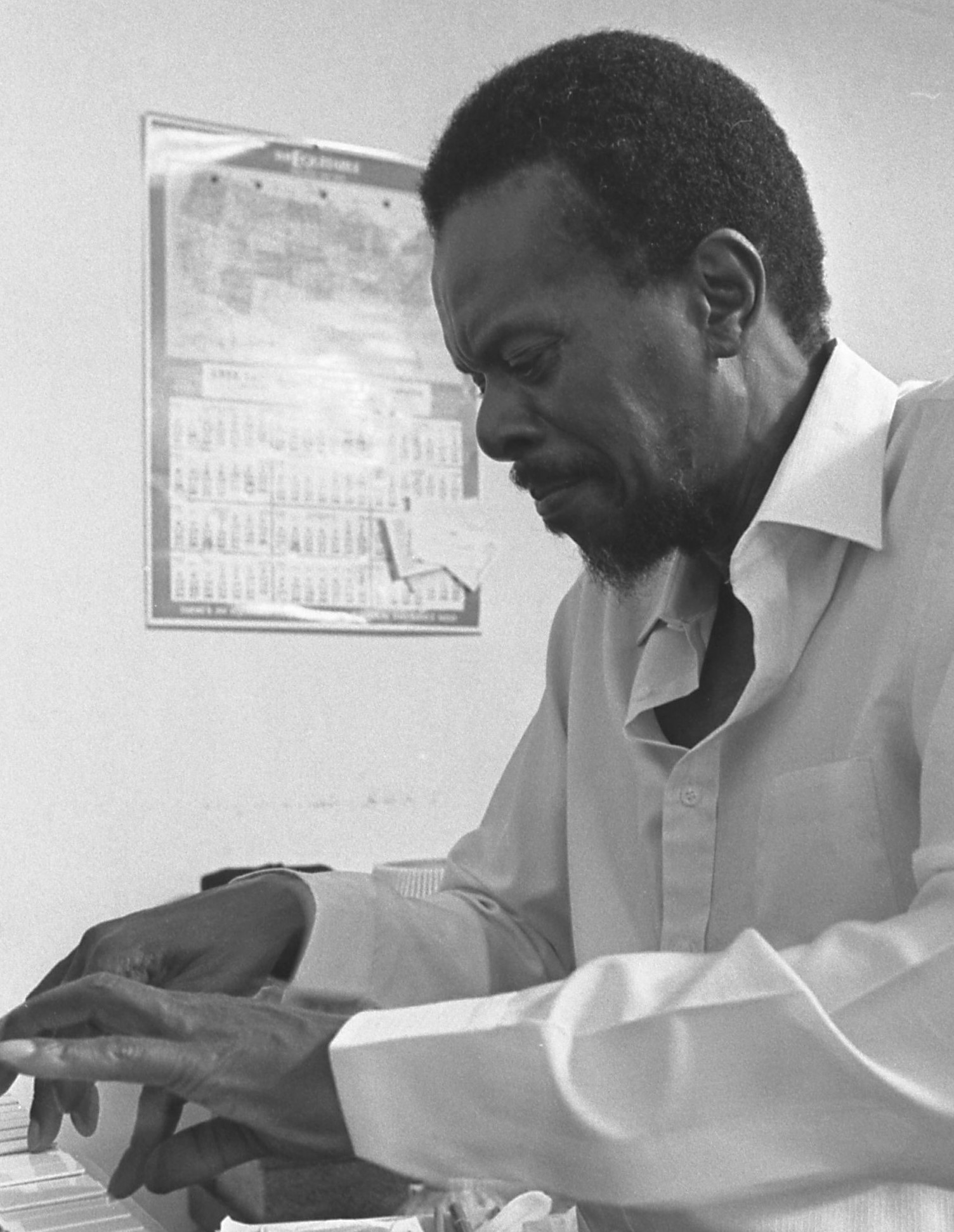
- Tapscott in 1986

Background information
- Born: Horace Elva Tapscott; April 6, 1934; Houston, Texas, U.S.
- Died: February 27, 1999 (aged 64) Los Angeles, California, U.S.
- Genres: Jazz
- Occupations: Musician, composer
- Instruments: Piano, trombone
- Years active: 1950s–1990s
- Label: Arabesque

Horace Elva Tapscott (April 6, 1934 – February 27, 1999) was an American jazz pianist and composer. He formed the Pan Afrikan Peoples Arkestra (also known as P.A.P.A., or The Ark) in 1961 and led the ensemble through the 1990s.

== Early life ==
Tapscott was born in Houston, Texas, and moved to Los Angeles, California, at the age of nine. By this time he had begun to study piano and trombone. He played with Frank Morgan, Don Cherry, Bobby Bradford, and Billy Higgins as a teenager.

== Later life and career ==
After service in the Air Force in Wyoming, he returned to Los Angeles and played trombone with various bands, notably Lionel Hampton (1959–61). Soon after, though, he quit playing trombone and focused on piano.

In 1961, Tapscott formed the Pan Afrikan Peoples Arkestra, with the aim of preserving, developing and performing African-American music. As his vision grew, this became just one part of a larger organization in 1963, the Underground Musicians Association (UGMA), which later changed name to the Union of God's Musicians and Artists Ascension (UGMAA). Arthur Blythe, Stanley Crouch, Butch Morris, Wilber Morris, David Murray, Jimmy Woods, Nate Morgan and Guido Sinclair all performed in Tapscott's Arkestra at one time or another. Tapscott and his work are the subjects of the UCLA Horace Tapscott Jazz Collection.

Enthusiasts of his music formed two labels in the 1970s and 1980s, Interplay and Nimbus, for which he recorded.

From AllMusic:

"His pianistic technique was hard and percussive, likened by some to that of Thelonious Monk and Herbie Nichols and every bit as distinctive. In contexts ranging from freely improvised duos to highly arranged big bands, Tapscott exhibited a solo and compositional voice that was his own."

== Death and legacy ==
Having been suffering from brain cancer, Tapscott died aged 64 on February 27, 1999, the day before a planned tribute concert in his honor took place at Los Angeles' Leimert Park.

An engraving in the sidewalk along Degnan Boulevard in the Leimert Park neighborhood reads: "Horace Tapscott, the local pianist and organizer whose ensemble, the Pan Afrikan Peoples Arkestra, gave many musicians their first gigs and helped heal a community impacted by racism."

His personal archive of manuscripts, arrangements and recordings was donated to UCLA Library in 2003 by his wife, Cecilia Tapscott.

== Discography ==
=== As leader ===
- The Giant Is Awakened (Flying Dutchman, 1969) - as Horace Tapscott Quintet
- Songs of the Unsung (Interplay, 1978)
- In New York (Interplay, 1979)
- Lighthouse 79, Vol. 1 (Nimbus West, 1979 [2009])
- Lighthouse 79, Vol. 2 (Nimbus West, 1979 [2009])
- At the Crossroads (with Everett Brown, Jr.) (Nimbus West, 1980)
- Dial 'B' for Barbra (Nimbus West, 1981) - as Horace Tapscott Sextet
- Live At Lobero (with Roberto Miranda and Sonship) (Nimbus West, 1981)
- Live At Lobero, Vol. II (with Roberto Miranda and Sonship) (Nimbus West, 1981)
- Little Africa (piano solo) (Art Union, 1983)
- Dissent or Descent (Nimbus West, 1984 [1998])
- Autumn Colors (Bopland, 1984; reissue: Interplay, 1990)
- The Dark Tree (HatArt, 1991) - originally released as two separate volumes and re-released as a 2-CD set
- Horace Tapscott's Arkestra Live in Chicago (1993)
- Among Friends (with Sonny Simmons) (Jazz Friends Productions, 1995 [1999])
- Aiee! The Phantom (Arabesque, 1996)
- Thoughts of Dar es Salaam (Arabesque, 1997)
- Live at Théâtre Du Chêne Noir - Avignon, France 1989 (with Michael Session) (The Village, 2020)
- Legacies for Our Grandchildren - Live in Hollywood, 1995 (Dark Tree, 2022) - as Horace Tapscott Quintet

=== With the Pan-Afrikan Peoples Arkestra ===
- The Call (Nimbus West, 1978)
- Flight 17 (Nimbus West, 1978)
- Live at I.U.C.C. (Nimbus West, 1979)
- Why Don't You Listen? Live at LACMA, 1998 (with the Great Voice of UGMAA) (Dark Tree, 2019)
- Ancestral Echoes: The Covina Sessions, 1976 (Dark Tree, 2020)
- Live at Century City Playhouse 9/9/79 (Nimbus West, 2020)

=== As sideman ===
With Lou Blackburn

- Jazz Frontier (Imperial, 1963)
- Two Note Samba (Imperial, 1963)
  - Both titles compiled on The Complete Imperial Sessions (Blue Note, 2006)

With Roberto Miranda's Home Music Ensemble

- Live at Bing Theatre - Los Angeles, 1985 (Dark Tree, 2021)

=== As composer and arranger ===
With Sonny Criss

- Sonny's Dream (Birth of the New Cool) (Prestige, 1968)
- Crisscraft (Muse, 1975) - composer only

== Bibliography ==
- Dailey, Raleigh. "The Dark Tree: Jazz and the Community Arts in Los Angeles" (review). Notes Volume 63, Number 3, March 2007, pp. 632–634.
- Isoardi, Steven L. The Dark Tree: Jazz and the Community Arts in Los Angeles. April 2006. 394p. illus. index. University of California, $34.95 (0-520-24591-1).
- Isoardi, Steven L. Songs of the Unsung: The Musical and Social Journey of Horace Tapscott. Duke University Press, 2001.
- Isoardi, Steven L. The Music Finds a Way: A PAPA/UGMAA Oral History of Growing Up In Postwar South Central Los Angeles. Dark Tree, 2020.
