= Sixty-Eight (album) =

Studio album by Billy Hart
- Released: January 18, 2011
- Recorded: October 17, 2009
- Genre: Jazz
- Length: 69:30
- Label: SteepleChase; SCCD 31707
- Producer: Nils Winther

Billy Hart chronology
Live at the Cafe Damberd (2009)	Sixty-Eight (2011)	All Our Reasons (2012)

Sixty-Eight is a jazz album by drummer Billy Hart, released on SteepleChase in 2011. The album marks Hart's 68th recording for Steeplechase (and his first as a leader on the label), and his 68th year.

== Reception ==
Professional ratings
Review scores
Source	Rating
AllMusic	4/5 stars

The AllMusic review by Ken Dryden states "Billy Hart's inspired drumming is the undercurrent of the date, pushing the younger musicians to play at the top of their respective games". JazzTimes' Thomas Conrad noted "Like a new-millennium Art Blakey, Hart leads a young sextet of hot emerging players, but the band here is edgier than the Jazz Messengers ever were. The careening, cacophonous repertoire comes from an earlier generation of free thinkers like Ornette Coleman and Sam Rivers. ...But the best thing about a recording led by Hart is the generous exposure to his volcanically eruptive, complex creative process".

== Track listing ==
1. "What Reason" (Ornette Coleman) - 5:40
2. "Number Eight" (Eric Dolphy) - 5:53
3. "Serene" (Dolphy) - 5:50
4. "Fire Waltz" (Mal Waldron) - 6:52
5. "Beatrice" (Sam Rivers) - 7:08
6. "Cyclic Episode" (Rivers) - 9:08
7. "That's Just Lovely" (Jason Palmer) - 6:37
8. "Mrs Parker in K.C." (Jaki Byard) - 7:24
9. "Punctuations" (Dan Tepfer) - 7:54
10. "Out There" (Dolphy) - 7:04

== Personnel ==
- Billy Hart - drums
- Jason Palmer - trumpet
- Logan Richardson - alto saxophone
- Dan Tepfer - piano
- Michael Pinto - vibraphone
- Chris Tordini - double bass
