= Music for Violin Alone =

Studio album by Mark Feldman
- Released: February 21, 1995
- Recorded: April 17, 1994, Tedesco Studios, Paramus, NJ
- Genre: Contemporary classical music, jazz
- Length: 43:09
- Label: Tzadik TZ 7006
- Producer: Mark Feldman

Mark Feldman chronology
Music for Violin Alone (1995)	Music for Violin and Piano (1999)

Music for Violin Alone is an album by violinist Mark Feldman which was released on the Tzadik label in 1995.

== Reception ==
Professional ratings
Review scores
Source	Rating
Allmusic	4.5/5 stars
The Penguin Guide to Jazz Recordings	3/4 stars

In her review for Allmusic, Joslyn Layne notes that "Music for Violin Alone is the debut date as leader for virtuoso violinist Mark Feldman, who has performed as a sideman with countless musicians, in genres ranging from country to avant-garde jazz. Here he performs original, classically styled pieces that exude high drama". On All About Jazz Karla Cornejo Villavincencio said "The whole record is dedicated to the solo violin and the attention is well-deserved, Feldman's playing easily keeping the listener enraptured".

== Track listing ==
All compositions by Mark Feldman

1. "Etude" - 2:18
2. "Jeté" - 8:52
3. "Calista" - 5:52
4. "Sul G" - 1:57
5. "Molly" - 1:33
6. "Caprice" - 1:49
7. "Fantasy for the Violin" - 5:32
8. "Elergy" - 6:37
9. "Stalker" - 2:03
10. "The Tri Five" - 2:35
11. "4 Spiker" - 4:01

== Personnel ==
- Mark Feldman - violin
