= The Dark Tree =

Live album by Horace Tapscott
- Released: 1991
- Recorded: December 14–17, 1989 at the Catalina Bar & Grill in Hollywood, California
- Genre: Jazz
- Length: 99:46
- Label: Hat ART 6053 & 6083
- Producer: Gunther Georg Schmid & Werner X. Uehlinger

Horace Tapscott chronology
| Dissent or Descent (1984) | The Dark Tree (1991) | Aiee! The Phantom (1996) |

Volume 2 Cover

The Dark Tree is a live album by pianist Horace Tapscott recorded in 1989 and released on the Hat ART label as two separate volumes in 1991. The album was re-released as a double CD in 1999 and 2009

== Reception ==
Professional ratings
Review scores
| Source | Rating |
|---|---|
| Allmusic | 4.5/5 stars |
| Penguin Guide to Jazz | 👑 |

The Allmusic review by Steve Loewy awarded the album 4½ stars stating "The pianist shows his feathers on piece after piece (most of which were written by him), in which he is as comfortable with post-bop runs as he is with their avant-garde implications. Through it all, you can hear his blues-drenched roots".

The Penguin Guide to Jazz awarded the album a "Crown" signifying a recording that the authors "feel a special admiration or affection for".

All About Jazz stated "The Dark Tree has only been sporadically available since its original, limited edition release in 1991, and the re-releases have been small runs. In the gloaming, fables have grown around the album. But as is by no means always the case with rarities, the reality here is as good as the legend: this motherlode of groove is a signature performance by a woefully neglected artist"

== Track listing ==
All compositions by Horace Tapscott except as indicated

Disc One:

1. "The Dark Tree" - 20:56
2. "Sketches of Drunken Mary" - 11:32
3. "Lino's Pad" - 16:46
4. "One for Lately" (Thurman Green) - 10:24

Disc Two:

1. "Sandy and Niles" - 11:17
2. "Bavarian Mist" (Michael Session) - 13:16
3. "The Dark Tree 2" - 18:30
4. "A Dress for Renee" - 4:57
5. "Nyja's Theme" - 19:44

== Personnel ==
- Horace Tapscott - piano
- John Carter - clarinet
- Cecil McBee - contrabass
- Andrew Cyrille - drums
