= What Exit =

Studio album by Mark Feldman
- Released: September 26, 2006
- Recorded: June 2005
- Studios: Avatar (New York, New York)
- Genre: Jazz
- Length: 70:49
- Labels: ECM; ECM 1928
- Producer: Manfred Eicher

Mark Feldman chronology
Book of Tells (2005)	What Exit (2006)	Secrets (2009)

What Exit is an album by violinist Mark Feldman recorded in June 2005 and released on ECM September the following year. The quartet features rhythm section John Taylor, Anders Jormin, and Tom Rainey.

== Reception ==
Professional ratings
Review scores
Source	Rating
AllMusic	4/5 stars
The Guardian	4/5 stars
PopMatters	6/10 stars
The Penguin Guide to Jazz Recordings	4/4 stars

The Allmusic review awarded the album 4 stars stating "The compositions are Feldman originals, and are rife with nuanced traces of his eclectic stylistic approach, not to mention the artist's magnificent skill on the violin."

The Guardian's John Fordham observed, "Contemporary jazz/classical violin might be a bit spiky for some, but the musicianship and the conversational skills are remarkable."

PopMatters reviewer Will Layman said, "there’s a ton for modern jazz fans to enjoy here, and it is plain that Mark Feldman—having paid his dues a dozen times over—is deserving of the spotlight. ECM has given him a superior opportunity here, with a sparkling but bold trio at his back. The road ahead looks to paved with more good music."

JazzTimes's Mike Shanley commented, "What Exit is sequenced to alternate ruminative pieces with more upbeat ones, with variations in structure marking each piece... Throughout, Feldman plays with a strong tone that never gets thin or shrill, even as he flies into the upper register of his instrument."

All About Jazz reviewer John Kelman said "What Exit is a stunning debut from a group that hopefully won't be just a one-time affair."

Billboard's Philip Booth said, "It's an engaging, sometimes challenging mix of avant-jazz and new-classical styles."

The Penguin Jazz Guide reflected "What Exit was worth the wait. Feldman doesn't so much bathe in the wonderful sound Manfred Eicher and engineer James Farber lay out for him as rise to the challenge of it. Feldman's violin has become a compelling improvisational voice."

== Track listing ==
All compositions by Mark Feldman

1. "Arcade" - 22:52
2. "Father Demo Square" - 5:57
3. "Everafter" - 8:44
4. "Ink Pin" - 5:12
5. "Elegy" - 5:51
6. "Maria Nuñes" - 9:38
7. "Cadence" - 8:18
8. "What Exit" - 3:41

== Personnel ==
- Mark Feldman – violin
- John Taylor – piano
- Anders Jormin – bass
- Tom Rainey – drums
