= Jazz French Horn =

Studio album by Tom Varner
- Released: 1985
- Recorded: October 8 & 9, 1985
- Genre: Jazz
- Length: 44:16
- Label: Soul Note
- Producer: Tom Varner

Tom Varner chronology
Motion/Stillness (1983)	Jazz French Horn (1985)	Covert Action (1988)

Jazz French Horn is the third album by American jazz French horn player and composer Tom Varner recorded in 1985 and released as an LP on the New Note label, and later as a CD on the Italian Soul Note label.

== Reception ==
Professional ratings
Review scores
Source	Rating
AllMusic	4.5/5 stars
The Penguin Guide to Jazz Recordings	3/4 stars

The AllMusic review by Scott Yanow awarded the album 4½ stars, calling it, "A perfect introduction to both Tom Varner and the 'jazz French horn'".

The authors of the Penguin Guide to Jazz Recordings commented: "the band is excellent and even as a repertory exercise it's very well done."

== Track listing ==
All compositions by Tom Varner except as indicated

1. "What Is This Thing Called First Strike Capability?" - 6:13
2. "Quasimodo" (Charlie Parker) - 4:41
3. "Blues for Z" - 4:05
4. "Lost in the Stars" (Maxwell Anderson, Kurt Weill) - 3:49
5. "So Sorry Please" (Bud Powell) - 5:30
6. "April Remembrance" - 10:09
7. "I Love You" (Cole Porter) - 4:50
8. "Quasimodo" [alternate take] (Parker) - 8:51
9. "So Sorry Please" [alternate take] (Powell) - 5:20
10. "Come Sunday" (Duke Ellington) - 2:57

- Recorded at Classic Sound in New York City on October 8 & 9, 1985

All photos by Roe DiBona

== Personnel ==
- Tom Varner - French horn
- Jim Snidero - alto saxophone
- Kenny Barron - piano
- Mike Richmond - bass
- Victor Lewis - drums
