= Amethyst (Billy Hart album) =

Studio album by Billy Hart
- Released: 1993
- Recorded: May 27 & 29, 1993
- Studio: Sound on Sound Recording, Inc., NYC
- Genre: Jazz
- Length: 66:52
- Label: Arabesque; AJ0105
- Producer: Marc Copland

Billy Hart chronology
Rah (1988)	Amethyst (1993)	Oceans of Time (1996)

Amethyst is an album by American jazz drummer Billy Hart recorded in 1993 and released on the Arabesque label.

== Reception ==
Professional ratings
Review scores
Source	Rating
AllMusic	3/5 stars
The Penguin Guide to Jazz Recordings	3.5/4 stars

AllMusic awarded the album 3 stars with its review by David R. Adler stating, "there's plenty of beautiful music on the album, plenty of representative brilliance from all these fine players, and even a substantial amount of originality and vision".

== Track listing ==
All compositions by Billy Hart except as indicated

1. "Amethyst" - 12:14
2. "King of Harts" (John Stubblefield) - 7:35
3. "El Junque" (Santi Debriano) - 7:32
4. "Melanos" (David Fiuzynski) - 10:09
5. "Irah" - 6:52
6. "Asylum" (Mark Feldman) - 12:05
7. "Dirty Dogs" (David Kikoski) - 10:25

== Personnel ==
- Billy Hart - drums
- John Stubblefield - tenor saxophone, soprano saxophone
- David Fiuczynski - guitar
- David Kikoski - piano
- Marc Copland - keyboards (tracks 5 & 6)
- Mark Feldman - violin
- Santi Debriano - bass
