= Nate Morgan =

American jazz pianist

Nate "Mrafu" Morgan (February 9, 1953 – November 21, 2013) was an American jazz pianist and composer.

== Biography ==
In Junior Highschool, Nate Morgan played in various bands and studied with Joe Sample and Hampton Hawes. In highschool, he was part of the cooperative Union of God's Musicians and Artists Ascension (UGMAA). In the following years he worked mainly in the Los Angeles jazz community, playing with Horace Tapscott, Rufus and Chaka Khan, Renée Geyer and Bone Thugs-N-Harmony. He was influenced by Stanley Cowell and McCoy Tyner, and often played in Charlie O's music club in Van Nuys and in Encino, alongside Arthur Blythe, John Heard, Charles Owens, Nedra Wheeler and Sonship Theus, and in a piano duete with Elias Negash. One of his compositions, "Tapscottian Waltz", in honor of Tapscott, was never recorded by him. Morgan also wrote the score for the documentary I Build the Tower (2006).

Morgan recorded three albums, was conductor of the Ujaama Ensemble and a member of the soul jazz group, Build an Ark. He participated in 16 recording sessions between 1972 and 2008, alongside artists such as Sweet Baby J'ai, Bobby Bradford/John Carter, Bobby Bryant (Flowers Stolen from the Yards of Old Folks, 2002) and in 2008 with Azar Lawrence (Speak the Word). In 2008, Morgan suffered a stroke which ended his career. A tribute concert in honor of Morgan's 50th birthday was played by Kamau Daa'ood, Pharoah Sanders, Ojenke, Otis O’Solomon Smith and Arthur Blythe.

== Discography ==
- Retribution, Reparation (Nimbus, 1982), with Danny Cortez, Jesse Sharps, Joel Ector, Fritz Wise
- Journey into Nigritia (Nimbus/Vivid Sound, 1983), with Dadisi Komolafe, Jeff Littleton, Fritz Wise
- Live in Santa Barbara (Nimbus, 1996), with Geoff Littleton, Fritz Wise
