= Dissent or Descent =

Dissent of Descent

Studio album by Horace Tapscott
- Released: 1998
- Recorded: 1984 in NYC
- Genre: Jazz
- Length: 77:08
- Label: Nimbus West; NS 509 C
- Producer: Tom Albach

Horace Tapscott chronology
The Tapscott Sessions Vol. 8 (1984)	Dissent of Descent (1998)	The Dark Tree (1989)

Dissent or Descent is an album by American jazz pianist/composer Horace Tapscott recorded in 1984 but not released on the Nimbus West label until 1998.

== Reception ==
Professional ratings
Review scores
Source	Rating
AllMusic	4/5 stars
The Penguin Guide to Jazz Recordings	3.5/4 stars

AllMusic awarded the album 4 stars with its review by Don Snowden stating, "Tapscott's playing with the trio is fairly muted, with more emphasis put on his formidable melodic gifts than any virtuoso turns. Dissent or Descent may not be the best music any of these musicians created but it's a good example of solid, tasteful professionalism".

== Track listing ==
All compositions by Horace Tapscott except as indicated

1. "As a Child" - 7:09
2. "Sandy and Niles" - 7:33
3. "To the Great House" - 11:57
4. "Spellbound" (Clifford Jordan) - 14:14
5. "Ballad for Samuel" - 7:45
6. "Ruby, My Dear" (Thelonious Monk) - 10:23
7. "Chico's Back in Town" - 8:07

== Personnel ==
- Horace Tapscott - piano
- Fred Hopkins - bass
- Ben Riley - drums
