= Lou Blackburn =

American jazz trombonist (1922–1990)

Lou Blackburn (November 12, 1922 – 7 June 1990) was an American jazz trombonist.

== Biography ==
Blackburn was born in Rankin, Pennsylvania. He is best known for his work in the swing genre but he also performed in the West Coast jazz and soul jazz mediums. During the 1950s, he played swing music with Lionel Hampton, and also Charlie Ventura. In the early 1960s, he began performing with musicians like Cat Anderson, among others. He also appears on the album Mingus at Monterey by Charles Mingus. He also did crossover work with the Beach Boys and the Turtles, among others. From 1970 until his death, he lived in Germany, where he toured successfully with his ethno jazz band Mombasa. Blackburn died in Berlin in 1990.

== Discography ==
=== As leader ===
- Jazz Frontier (Imperial, 1963)
- Two Note Samba (Imperial, 1963)
- The Complete Imperial Sessions (Blue Note, 2006)

=== As sideman ===
With Duke Ellington

- Paris Blues (United Artists, 1961)
- First Time! The Count Meets the Duke (Columbia, 1971)
- The Girl's Suite and The Perfume Suite (Columbia, 1982)

With others

- Steve Allen, Soulful Brass #2 (Flying Dutchman, 1969)
- John Braheny, Some Kind of Change (By Pete 1968)
- Bobby Bryant, Swahili Strut (Cadet, 1971)
- Bumble Bee Slim, Back in Town (Pacific Jazz, 1962)
- June Christy, Something Broadway, Something Latin (Capitol, 1965)
- Bobby Darin, Venice Blue (Capitol, 1965)
- Gil Fuller, Night Flight (Pacific Jazz, 1966)
- Roosevelt Grier, Soul City (Recording Industries, 1964)
- Chico Hamilton, Chic Chic Chico (Impulse!, 1965)
- Lionel Hampton, Hamp's Big Band (Audio Fidelity, 1959)
- Tricky Lofton, Carmell Jones, Brass Bag (Pacific Jazz, 1962)
- Onzy Matthews, Blues with a Touch of Elegance (Capitol, 1964)
- Charles Mingus, Mingus at Monterey (Jazz Workshop, 1965)
- Thelonious Monk, Monk's Blues (Columbia, 1968)
- The Monkees, Listen to the Band (Rhino, 1991)
- Oliver Nelson, Live from Los Angeles (Impulse!, 1967)
- Esther Phillips, Confessin' the Blues (Atlantic, 1976)
- Lou Rawls, Black and Blue and Tobacco Road (Capitol, 2006)
- Nelson Riddle, Contemporary Sound of Nelson Riddle (United Artists, 1968)
- The Righteous Brothers, Back to Back (Philles, 1965)
- The Three Sounds, Coldwater Flat (Blue Note, 1968)
- Mason Williams, The Mason Williams Ear Show (Warner Bros., 1968)
- Gerald Wilson, Moment of Truth (Pacific Jazz, 1962)
- The Yellow Balloon, The Yellow Balloon (Canterbury, 1967)
