= Guido Sinclair =

- Born: December 1935; Fort Worth, Texas, U.S.
- Died: July 7, 1992 (aged 56)
- Occupation: Musician
- Instrument: Alto saxophone

Sinclair Greenwell Jr. (December 1935 - July 7, 1992) was an American jazz alto saxophonist. He was also known as Guido Sinclair, Sonny Harrison, and Junnie. He performed in Los Angeles, Chicago, and Champaign-Urbana, Illinois.

== Biography ==
Sinclair Greenwell was born in December 1935 in Fort Worth, Texas. He moved to Los Angeles, California in 1944. At Lafayette Junior High School he practiced Charlie Parker solos and met pianist Horace Tapscott. Greenwell and Tapscott formed a band with trumpeter Roy Brewster and drummer Charles Pendergraff while they attended Jefferson High School. Greenwell was a founding member of Tapscott's Pan Afrikan Peoples Arkestra in 1961 and played in the group until the mid-1980s. He moved to Chicago to be with his father. Later, he moved to Champaign-Urbana, Illinois and married harpist Shirley Blankenship. When he lived in Champaign-Urbana, Greenwell wrote many musical papers and performed. These papers include his compositions and records of advertisements from his performances. He performed frequently at Nature's Table.
