= Tom Varner =

American jazz horn player and composer (born 1957)

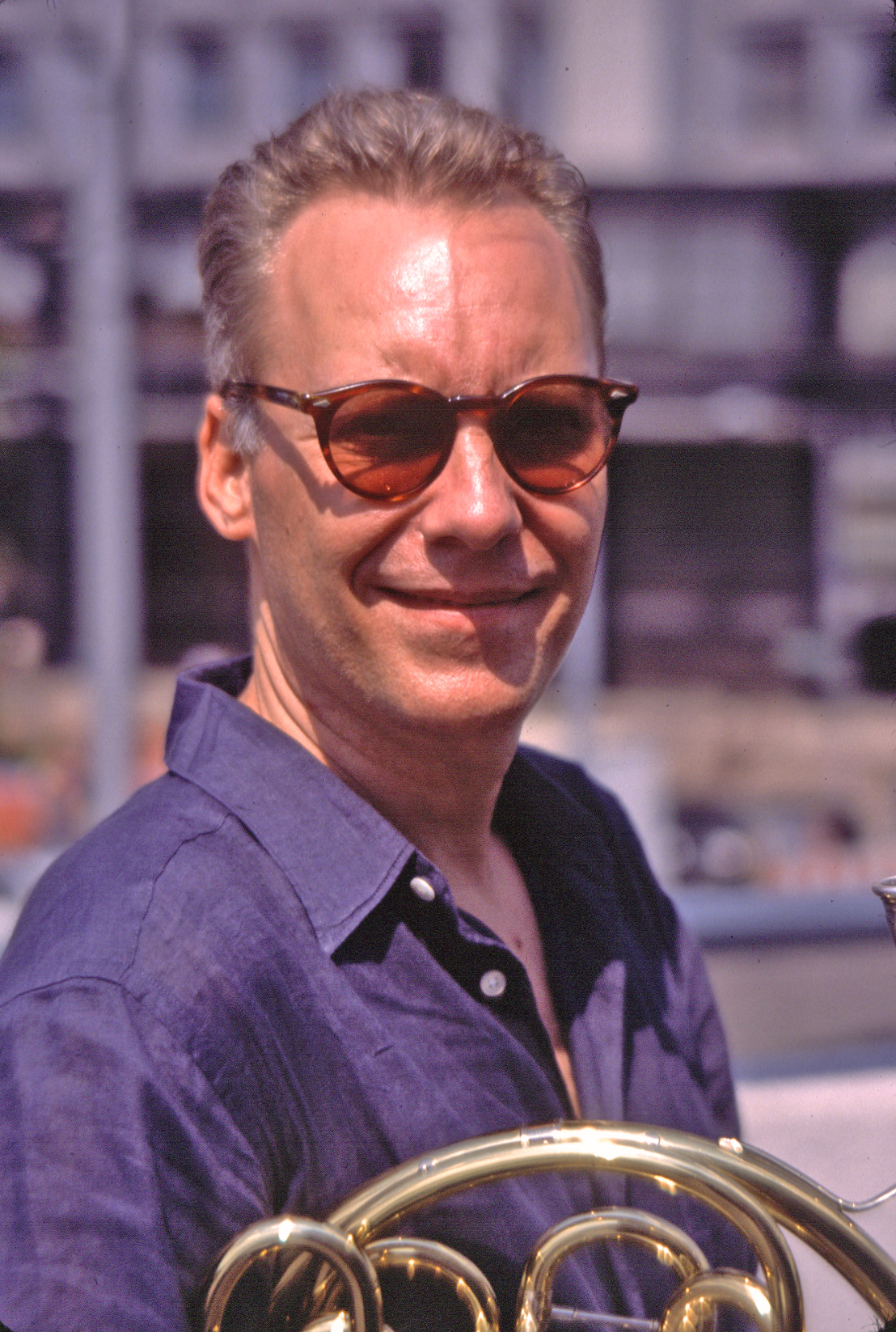

Background information
- Born: Tom Varner; June 17, 1957 (age 68); Morristown, New Jersey, United States
- Genres: Jazz
- Occupations: Musician, Composer, Teacher
- Instrument: French horn
- Website: tomvarnermusic.org

Tom Varner (born June 17, 1957 in Morristown, New Jersey, United States) is an American jazz horn (French horn) player and composer.

Varner grew up in Millburn, New Jersey, where he started playing in the orchestra at Millburn High School. He studied piano in his youth with Capitola Dickerson of Summit, New Jersey. He holds a B.M. degree (1979) from the New England Conservatory of Music, where he studied jazz improvisation and composition with Ran Blake, George Russell, and Jaki Byard, and horn with Thomas Newell. He also studied briefly in 1976 with jazz horn pioneer Julius Watkins. Varner also holds an M.A. (2005) from the City College of New York, where he studied with Jim McNeely, Scott Reeves, and John Patitucci.

== Biography ==
He has performed and recorded with Steve Lacy, Dave Liebman, George Gruntz, John Zorn, Bobby Watson, La Monte Young, Miles Davis with Quincy Jones, Bobby Previte, Jim McNeely, McCoy Tyner, Reggie Workman, the Mingus Orchestra, Franz Koglmann, and appears on more than 70 albums. He also has 13 albums out as a composer/leader, with sidemen such as Steve Wilson, Tony Malaby, Ed Jackson, Ellery Eskelin, Tom Rainey, Cameron Brown, Drew Gress, Matt Wilson, Kenny Barron, Victor Lewis, Fred Hopkins, and Billy Hart. Varner has been in the Down Beat Critics Poll Top Ten annually since the mid-1990s. He has been awarded grants from the Jack Straw Foundation, Seattle's 4Culture, National Endowment for the Arts, the Chamber Music America/Doris Duke Foundation, and has been a resident at the MacDowell, Blue Mountain Center, and Centrum arts colonies.

Varner's first two recordings as a leader were influenced by Ornette Coleman, Steve Lacy, Charles Mingus, Anthony Braxton, and minimalists such as Steve Reich and Philip Glass, and featured Varner's horn with alto sax (Ed Jackson), bass (Fred Hopkins or Ed Schuller) and drums (Billy Hart), with no chordal instrument. His third recording was a more "straight-ahead" jazz project, with Kenny Barron, Jim Snidero, Mike Richmond, and Victor Lewis. The fourth project was a Sonny Rollins-influenced trio of horn, bass (Mike Richmond) and drums (Bobby Previte). From that point (1987) on, most of Varner's work as a leader was for a quintet of horn and two saxes, bass, and drums, with frequent guest artists augmenting the ensembles. Varner has combined contemporary chamber music with jazz and free improvisation in almost all of his subsequent projects. His recent work (finished in 2008, released 2009), Heaven and Hell, is for a tentet of three brass, five reeds, and bass and drums. Another recent CD, Nine Surprises, is for a nonet of three brass, four reeds, and bass and drums, and was released in Fall 2014. It features Seattle players Mark Taylor, Steve Treseler, Eric Barber, Jim DeJoie, Thomas Marriott, David Marriott, Phil Sparks, and Byron Vannoy.

Varner lived in New York City from 1979 to 2005, and moved to Seattle, Washington in 2006. He is now Associate Professor of Music at Cornish College of the Arts.

== Discography ==
=== As leader ===
- 1981 - Tom Varner Quartet (Soul Note)
- 1983 - Motion/Stillness (Soul Note)
- 1985 - Jazz French Horn (Soul Note)
- 1987 - Covert Action (New Note)
- 1991 - Long Night Big Day (New World)
- 1993 - The Mystery of Compassion (Soul Note)
- 1997 - Martian Heartache (Soul Note)
- 1998 - The Window Up Above (New World)
- 1998 - The Swiss Duos (Unit)
- 1999 - Swimming (OmniTone)
- 2001 - Second Communion (OmniTone)
- 2009 - Heaven and Hell (OmniTone)
- 2014 - Nine Surprises (Tom Varner Music)
- 2022 - Sound Vespers (Tom Varner Music)
- 2023 - Out of the Mud: Duos with Neil Welch (Tom Varner Music)

=== As sideman ===
Varner appears on over 70 recordings including:

- Rabih Abou-Khalil, The Cactus of Knowledge (Enja, 2001)
- Jamie Baum Septet, Moving Forward, Standing Still (OmniTone)
- William S. Burroughs, Dead City Radio (Island, 1990)
- Consuelo Candelaria/Jon Hazilla Quintet Last Sunday Morning, (Accurate)
- Steve Cohn/Reggie Workman/Tom Varner, Bridge Across the X-Stream (Leo)
- Miles Davis and Quincy Jones, Miles & Quincy Live at Montreux (Warner Bros.)
- Dominic Duval, American Scrapbook (CIMP)
- East Down Septet, Out of Gridlock (Hep)
- East Down Septet, Channel Surfing (Hep)
- Elin, Lazy Afternoon (Blue Toucan)
- Lou Grassi/Tom Varner/Ron Horton/Tomas Ulrich, Neo Neo (CIMP)
- George Gruntz Concert Jazz Band '83, Theatre (ECM, 1983)
- George Gruntz Concert Jazz Band '87, Happening Now! (Hat Hut, 1987)
- George Gruntz Concert Jazz Band, First Prize (Enja, 1989)
- Ed Jackson, Wake Up Call (New World) [as producer and player]
- Hans Kennel, Habarigani Brass (Hat Art)
- Neal Kirkwood, Neal Kirkwood Octet (Timescraper)
- Jim Knapp, It's Not Business, It's Personal (Origin)
- Franz Koglmann, Let's Make Love (between the lines)
- Franz Koglmann, Make Believe (between the lines)
- Franz Koglmann, Cantos I-IV (Hat Art)
- Steve Lacy, Vespers (Soul Note, 1993)
- Steuart Liebig, Pomegranate (Cryptogramophone)
- Manhattan New Music Project, Mood Swing (Soul Note)
- Jim McNeely Tentet, Group Therapy (OmniTone)
- Natalie Merchant, Ophelia (Elektra)
- New York Composers Orchestra, Works by Ehrlich, Horvitz (New World)
- Orange Then Blue, Hold the Elevator (GM)
- Bobby Previte, Bump the Renaissance (Sound Aspects)
- Bobby Previte, Pushing the Envelope (Gramavision)
- Samo Salamon, Dream Suites Vol. 1 (Samo Records)
- Ken Schaphorst, Over the Rainbow—Music of Harold Arlen (Accurate)
- Peter Schärli Special Sextet, Blues for the Beast (Enja)
- Peter Schärli Special Sextet, Guilty (Enja)
- Roman Schwaller Nonet, The Original Tunes (JHM)
- Vern Sielert Dectet, From there to Here (Pony Boy)
- Burkhard Stangl/Ned Rothenberg/Werner Dafeldecker/Max Nagl/Tom Varner, Qui.t (Extraplatte)
- Ton-Art, Mal Vu, Mal Dit (Hat Art)
- Vienna Art Orchestra, Artistry in Rhythm (TCB)
- Bobby Watson, Tailor Made (Columbia)
- John Zorn Filmworks 1986–1990 (Elektra Nonesuch)
