= Pierre Blanchard =

French sailor

Personal information
- Nationality: French
- Born: 14 January 1945

Sailing career
- Sport: Sailing

Pierre Blanchard (born 14 January 1945) is a French sailor who competed in the 1968 Summer Olympics.
