= The Satin Sisters =

American literary trio

The Satin Sisters were a literary trio composed of Ntozake Shange, Thulani Davis, and Jessica Hagedorn, all three of whom were playwrights, poets, and novelists. The group's main focus surrounded the solidarity of African American and Asian women. Their works include the 1977 play Where the Mississippi Meets the Amazon and Shadow & Veil.

== History ==
=== 1960-1970: Enrollment at Barnard College ===
Thulani Davis and Ntozake Shange met as freshmen at Barnard College at a Black students’ mixer on campus. After Davis was published in one of the college's student publications, Shange approached her with her own poems. As a result, the two, with contributions and mentorship from Sonia Sanchez, published the zine Phat Mama in their senior year in 1970.

=== 1971-1973: Movement to California ===
In 1971, Davis met Jessica Hagedorn at the Western Additional Central Center, where they were reading their work with writers such as Roberto Vargas, Serafin Syquia, and Miz Redbone. Hagedorn and Davis were both invited to participate in marathon benefit readings for causes such as “Free Angela Davis,” “Stop the War in Vietnam,” “Support the Farmworkers,” and “Save the I-Hotel.”

Shange eventually moved to California in 1973 to teach Women's Studies at multiple universities in the Bay Area. At the time, Hagedorn was also a lead singer and lyricist for the rock ’n' roll and jazz band the West Coast Gangster Choir. The two met at Third World Communications, a women-artists’ collective in San Francisco.

=== 1974-1976: for colored girls who have considered suicide/when the rainbow is enuf ===
On December 22, 1974, the trio performed the first showing of Shange's choreopoem for colored girls who have considered suicide/when the rainbow is enuf at the women's bar Bacchanal with dancer and collaborator Paula Moss. The group also performed in spaces such as San Francisco's Intersection for the Arts and Minnie's Can-Do Club.

Six months later, Shange moved to New York City with Moss to perform the piece in New York's downtown alternative spaces. The project eventually made its Broadway debut at The Public Theater in 1976. During this time, Davis moved to New York, with Hagedorn following in 1978.

=== 1977: Formation of The Satin Sisters ===
While for colored girls who have considered suicide / when the rainbow is enuf was performing its initial run, Shange, Davis, and Hagedorn formed the Satin Sisters and wrote their first work together, Where the Mississippi Meets the Amazon, in 1977. The piece was a poetry and music cabaret show with David Murray on saxophone,Anthony Davis on piano, Fred Hopkins on bass, Pheeroan akLaff on drums, and Michael Gregory on guitar and vocals, eventually making its own debut at The Public Theater's Martinson Hall.

The Satin Sisters eventually collaborated to write Shadow & Veil, a poem from Davis's collection All the Renegade Ghosts Rise. In San Francisco, they organized group readings at popular venues for writers of color, such as the Art Institute's Intersection for the Arts and City Lights Bookstore.

=== 2018-Present: Ntozake Shange's Death and Onwards ===
On October 27, 2018, Ntozake Shange died in her sleep at the age of 70 after a series of strokes in 2004. Following her death, Hagedorn and Davis still speak of each other, collaborate on literary works, and honor Shange's memory. In 2019, Thulani Davis published an article dedicated to Shange, entitled "Somebody, anybody, sing a Black girl's song," for Barnard College's Winter 2019 issue of Barnard Magazine. On December 8, 2020, Hagedorn penned a foreword for Davis's book Nothing But the Music: Documentaries from Nightclubs, Lofts, Dance Halls, and a Tailor's Shop in Dakarn.

== Venues Performed ==
- Western Additional Central Center (1971)
- Third World Communications
- Bacchanal (1974)
- Minnie's Can-Do Club (1974)
- The Public Theater (1977)
- Art Institute's Intersection for the Arts
- City Lights Bookstore
