= Mobile Opera =

Opera company in Mobile, Alabama, US

- Formation: 1945
- Founder: Rose Palmai-Tenser
- Type: Opera company
- Location: Mobile, Alabama
- Website: www.mobileopera.org

Mobile Opera is an opera company located in Mobile, Alabama and is one of the oldest performing arts organizations in the United States, as well as the oldest performing arts organization in the State of Alabama, having been founded as the "Mobile Opera Guild" in 1945. Under its founder, Madame Rose Palmai-Tenser, a European concert artist from Czechoslovakia, two performances were presented in April 1946. As its General Director, Mrs. Tenser continued to lead the company until 1971.

In July 2002, Mobile Opera relocated its offices to the Josephine Larkins Music Center, a renovated rehearsal and administrative facility located in the designated downtown arts district. The company shares this facility with the Mobile Symphony. This collaboration between the city's performing arts organizations has been instrumental in the revitalization of the downtown area. With a 2,400-square-foot (220 m^{2}) rehearsal hall, seven private music studios, conference room, catering kitchen, patron ticketing services, landscaped courtyard and administrative offices, the Larkins Music Center is a significant cultural and community asset.

Upon the death of founder, Madame Rose, in 1971, Katherine Willson became the company's Production Coordinator and General Manager. During the company's 1995/1996 season, she became the first female President of the Board, celebrating Mobile Opera's 50th Anniversary Season and her own thirty-five year involvement with the company. Under General Director, Pelham "Pat" Pearce, Mobile Opera developed its production quality and initiated innovative programs dedicated to education and community outreach. The development of Mobile Opera as a nationally recognized company continued with the ten-year supervision of Jerome Shannon as General Director and conductor. Shannon was succeeded by Earl Jackson. Since 2010, the company has operated under the direction of General & Artistic Director, Scott Wright.

Mobile Opera continues to encourage young American operatic talent. Artists such as Nicholas Brownlee, Christine Weidinger, Michael Devlin, Susan Quittmeyer, Anthony Laciura, Barry McCauley, Stella Zambalis, Linda Zoghby, Amy Johnson, Philip Webb, Hal France and Sylvia McNair have made appearances with major opera companies such as the Metropolitan Opera, New York City Opera, Chicago Lyric Opera, San Francisco Opera and opera houses and festivals of Europe.

Under General & Artistic Director, Scott Wright, Mobile Opera has developed an innovative approach to the presentation of opera at The Temple Downtown, a former masonic lodge, where traditional the traditional theater setting is joined by table seating. Wright has expanded the repertoire to include premieres, contemporary works, and re-imaginings of traditional operas. In addition to mainstage productions, Mobile Opera has added a third, chamber or one-act opera, and many recitals, concerts, and programs to enhance the knowledge and appreciation of opera throughout the region. Education and Community Outreach, under the direction of Stacey Driskell, produced annual educational programs including "Pigaro's Diner" (written by Wright), an award-winning program on child nutrition that has been seen by more than 40,000 Alabama school children.

== See also ==
- List of opera companies
