= Opera Omaha =

Regional opera company in Nebraska, US

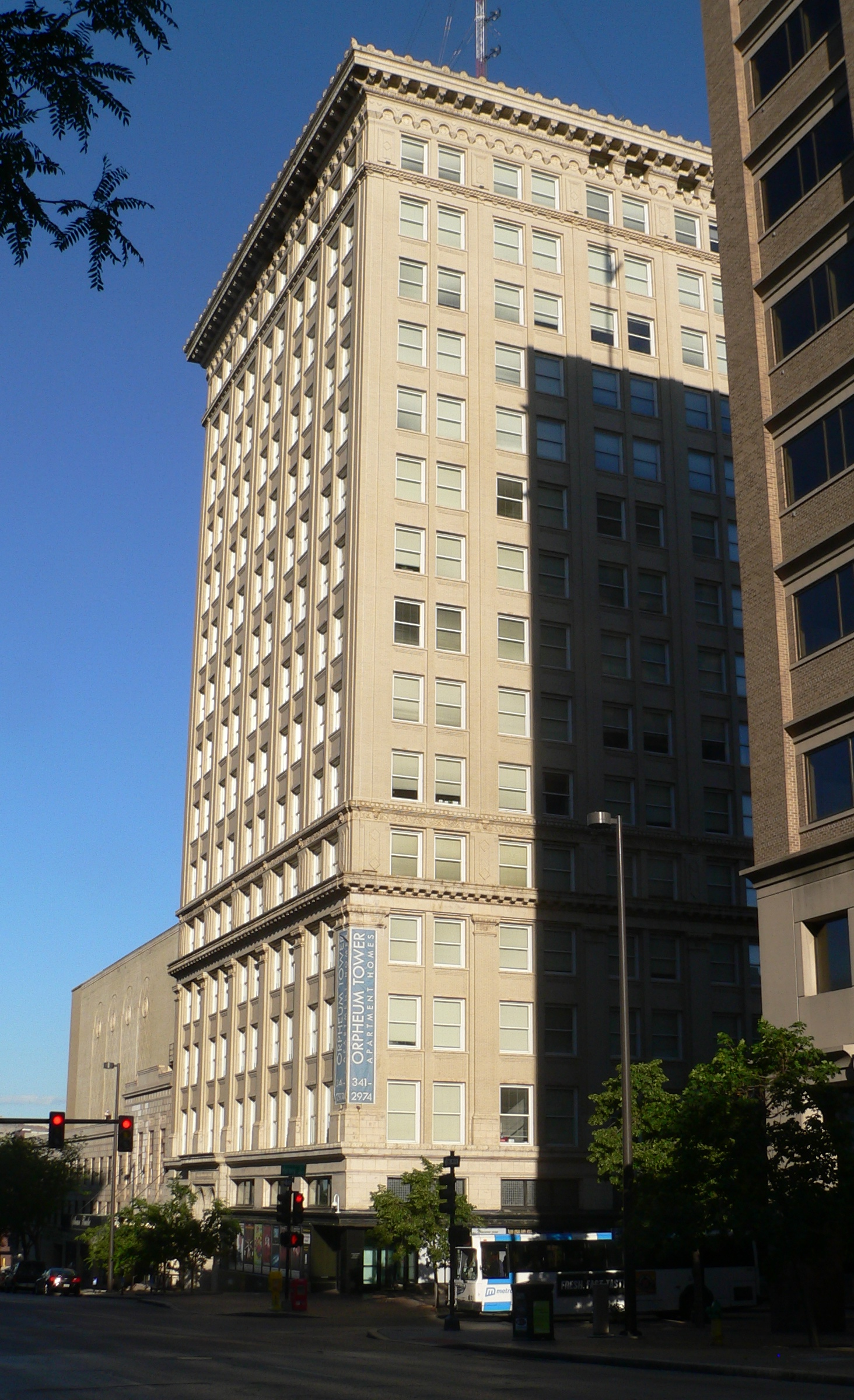
City National Bank (Omaha) - Orpheum Theater building.

Opera Omaha is a major regional opera company in Omaha, Nebraska. Founded in 1958, the professional company is widely known for the International Fall Festival events it held in the 1980s and 1990s, which garnered international attention and served as the U.S. and world premieres for a number of notable works. One of these performances, the 1990 U.S. premiere of the 1841 work Maria Padilla, was among the primary debuts for noted soprano Renee Fleming. "I’ve been calling all my singer friends and saying, 'You’ve got to sing for this company.'" Fleming said at the time. It has "a lot of vision." In 2007, the Toronto Star said "Opera Omaha has grown into one of the continent's most enterprising regional opera companies."

After attending the 1992 Fall Festival, Denver Post critic Jeff Bradley wrote that "this quiet prairie city on the Missouri River is becoming one of the most exciting operatic meccas in the country." The Fort Worth (Texas) Star-Telegram in 1992 said Omaha had become "operatically speaking, one of the most exciting cities in America." Similarly, in 1988, the Christian Science Monitor said of Opera Omaha: The company "demonstrated that 'regional opera' is no longer a pejorative term, that companies such as Opera Omaha offer a real service to their communities as well as the opera world."

The company's beginnings were decidedly more humble, with its 1958 bill as the Omaha Civic Opera Company composed of four performances: Madama Butterfly, Hansel and Gretel, Oklahoma! and Tosca. Since its founding, singers such as Beverly Sills, Tatiana Troyanos, Samuel Ramey, Frederica von Stade, Catherine Malfitano and Richard Tucker have performed in this company's productions. Sills in 1975 performed the title role in Opera Omaha's production of Lucia di Lammermoor, which was the first production to grace the stage of the then-newly renovated Creighton Orpheum Theater, still the home of the company's main-stage productions.

In September 1989, the company presented a concert at the Ak-Sar-Ben (arena) by Placido Domingo, drawing 6,231 people, according to a local press account.

The Omaha Symphony Orchestra is the opera company's resident orchestra. Opera productions are sometimes under the direction of the company's music director, the baton of a guest conductor or the baton of the orchestra's own music director.

Opera Omaha is also home to the Opera Omaha Craftsman's Guild, the nation's only volunteer organized guild that is integral to Opera Omaha's success since 1962. The Craftsman's Guild members donate stagecraft skills in the areas of wardrobe, makeup/wigs, concessions, and parties.

== Commissions ==
Opera Omaha is known for commissioning a number of modern American works:

Eric Hermannson's Soul, based on a short story by Pulitzer Prize-winning author Willa Cather. The work was performed in 1998 under the direction of then-Music Director Hal France. The opera was composed by Libby Larsen with a libretto by Chas Rader-Shieber.

Wakonda's Dream in 2003, a work that had its premiere in 2007 and was inspired by events that took place in Nebraska in the late 19th century, including the trial of Ponca Chief Standing Bear. Anthony Davis (composer) composed the opera, with the libretto written by Pulitzer Prize-winning poet Yusef Komunyakaa. Rhoda Levine served as director.

Blizzard Voices in 2008, based on a work by Pulitzer Prize-winning poet Ted Kooser, who also served as the work's librettist. Pulitzer Prize–winning musician Paul Moravec composed the work, which was performed under the direction of then-Opera Omaha Music Director Stewart Robertson.

The company, along with the New Jersey State Opera, the Rochester Opera and the Celebrity Series of Boston commissioned the 1997 work Many Moons, which is based on the children's book of the same name.

== World and U.S. Premieres ==
Opera Omaha is internationally known for its productions of world and U.S. premieres of a number of classical and modern works:

1988: The company staged the U.S. premiere of the 1730 George Frideric Handel opera seria Partenope under music director John DeMain and stage director Stephen Wadsworth.

1988: The company staged the U.S. premiere of the 1967 Udo Zimmermann piece Weiße Rose under music director John DeMain and stage director Stephen Wadsworth.

1990: The company staged the U.S. premiere of the 1924 Nicolae Bretan opera Golem under stage director and the opera's associate artistic director Keith Warner. The production was designed by John Pascoe.

1990: The company staged the U.S. premiere of the 1841 Gaetano Donizetti melodrama Maria Padilla. The production was considered a breakout performance of then-young soprano Renee Fleming. John Pascoe was director and designer of the U.S. premiere in Omaha.

1992: The company staged the U.S. premiere of the 1819 Gioachino Rossini azione tragica Ermione with stage director Jonathan Miller.

1992: The company staged the world premiere of "Autumn Valentine: Dorothy Parker's General Review of the Sex Situation." The New York Times called it "an unclassifiable collaboration by Angelina Reaux and Michael Sokol, singers; Ricky Ian Gordon, composer and pianist; and Keith Warner as director."

1992: The company presented the world premiere of the 1959 Hugo Weisgall work The Gardens of Adonis, based on the eponymous poem by William Shakespeare. It was staged by Opera Omaha's associate artistic director at the time, Keith Warner. Soprano Melanie Helton originated the "fiendishly difficult role of Venus."

1994: The company staged the world premiere of Andrew Lloyd Webber's Requiem Variations under the baton of Lionel Friend, who for 13 years was chief conductor of the English National Opera. Lloyd Webber attended the final performance; the production ran for 10 performances at the Creighton Orpheum Theater and drew a total of 21,546 people, according to an August 1994 Omaha World-Herald article. "It certainly seems that I'd like to come to Omaha and have another show again if they like me," Weber told The World-Herald.

2004: The company staged the world premiere of the locally written "Bloodlines," a work whose music and libretto were composed by Deborah Fischer Teason. Teason collaborated with students from majority-Latino Omaha South High School on the work.

2004: The company staged the world premiere of the "Dream of the Pacific," with music by Stephen Mager and a libretto by Elkhanah Pulitzer.

== Collaboration with Jun Kaneko ==
Noted Japanese ceramic artist Jun Kaneko has collaborated with Opera Omaha on two productions, a 2006 production of Madama Butterfly and a 2013 co-production with the San Francisco Opera and the Washington National Opera of The Magic Flute. Kaneko, born in 1942 in Nagoya, Japan, came to the United States in 1963 and has lived in Omaha, Nebraska since 1990, where he established his studio. In 2008, Kaneko designed a production of Fidelio for the Opera Company of Philadelphia. Kaneko was a founder of Omaha's Bemis Center for Contemporary Arts, a residency program that has been called the "largest urban artists' colony in the world."

== Music, Artistic and General Directors and Advisers ==
1958–60: Richard Valente, Director
1960–69: Joseph Levine, Music and Artistic Director
1969–74: Leo Kopp, Music Director
1970–76: James de Blasis, Resident Director
1974–77: Jonathan Dudley, General Director
1977–78: Peter Mark, Artistic Adviser
1978–80 Richard Gaddes, Artistic Adviser
1980–81: Paulette Haupt-Nolen, Artistic Adviser
1981–1995: Mary Robert, General Director
1982–83: George Manahan, Music Director
1983–92: John DeMain, Music Director
1992–93: Keith Warner, Artistic Director
1995–2003: Jane Hill, Executive Director
1995–2005: Hal France, Artistic Director
2003–2007: Joan Desens, General Director
2005–2008: Stewart Robertson, Artistic Director
2007–2010: John Wehrle, General Director
2011–2023: Roger Weitz, General Director
2023-current: Allison Swenson, General Director

== Venues ==
The company's main productions are staged at the near-3,000-seat Creighton Orpheum Theater in downtown Omaha. Other venues include the 1,000-seat Witherspoon Concert Hall at the Joslyn Art Museum, the 2,500-seat Music Hall at the Omaha Civic Auditorium, the 1,000-seat Rose Theater at the Omaha Theater Company for Young People and the 500-seat performance hall in the Scottish Rite Center. Its administrative offices are in downtown Omaha.

== Outreach ==
The company says its goal is to "make opera accessible to everyone in the community."

In November 2011, its 10 student performances of Hansel & Gretel delivered kid-friendly opera to nearly 8,000 students from elementary schools across the region.

In the 2012–13 season, more than 1,800 middle and high school students attended Opera Omaha performances, many for the first time.

Opera Omaha is the home to the Holland Community Opera Fellowship. Begun in 2017, The Holland Community Opera Fellowship works collaboratively with community partners to co-create programming that helps individuals, organizations, and communities reach their goals, serving as a creative and artistic resource to the community.

The Fellowship brings community-minded, entrepreneurial artists to live and work in Omaha. Fellows serve as ambassadors of the company, developing relationships with community leaders to co-design and implement unique projects that combine artistry and musicianship, leadership, advocacy, and citizenship.

== See also ==
- Culture in Omaha, Nebraska
