= Peter K. Winkler =

American composer and musicologist

Peter K. Winkler (born 1943, Los Angeles, California) is an American composer and a musicologist specializing in the theory of popular music. His compositions include both concert works and music for the theater; many of his works involve a synthesis of popular and classical styles.

== Biography ==
While a high school student, Winkler studied composition and theory with Howard Brubeck, and at Aspen Music School (1959) with Darius Milhaud. He earned a B.A. in music at the University of California (1963), studying with David Lewin and Seymour Shifrin, and an M.F.A. at Princeton University, where his principal teacher was Earl Kim. He continued studying with Earl Kim as a Junior Fellow in the Society of Fellows at Harvard University (1968–71) He then joined the music faculty of Stony Brook University, where he taught for 42 years, retiring in 2014. As a pianist, Winkler was the accompanist for Rhoda Levine's improvisational opera group, Play it by Ear from 1996 to 2012, and appears with his wife, violinist Dorothea Cook, in the duo Silken Rags. Their CD of original works was described by the Seattle Times as "a lovely and inventive disc of genre-bending compositions... rhythmically complex, harmonically rich music with influences extending from gospel and Caribbean to samba and tango." He was a pioneer in teaching university courses in popular music, and was one of the founding members of the U.S. Branch of the International Association for the Study of Popular Music, editing its newsletter RPM from 1984 to 1989 and its Journal of Popular Music Studies from 1992 to 1995.

== Music ==
The composer William Bolcom has written of Winkler's music: "in our tragic and unsettling age, his music actually makes a listener feel better about life, curing the soul." Winkler's principal concert works include:

- String Quartet (1965–67) (premiered by The Composers Quartet at Princeton and Harvard Universities)
- Humoresque for solo piano (1968–70), a winner of the 1976 League of Composers-ISCM piano music competition
- Symphony (1971–78, revised 2015) written for the opening of the Fine Arts Center at Stony Brook University
- Clarinet Bouquet (1976–80) written for Jack Kreiselman
- Recitativo e Terzetto (1980, First Prize, New England Reed Trio Competition, 2000),
- No Condition is Permanent (1980–89) commissioned by the Stony Brook Contemporary Chamber Players
- Solitaire for solo clarinet (1989)
- Waterborne for violin and electronic sounds (1991)
- Nine Waltzes (1997) commissioned by the Guild Trio
- Serenade for String Orchestra (1998) commissioned by the Kammergild Chamber Orchestra
- Partita (2001) commissioned by the Stony Brook Baroque Ensemble
- Fantasy (for cello septet) (2007) written for Colin Carr
- Seven Bagatelles (2011–12) commissioned by pianist Jeffrey Marcus
- Trio for Horn, Violin and Piano (2012–13) commissioned by Chamberosity.
- Nottamun Town (soprano and harp) (2016) written for Rachel Schutz

Theatrical Works:

- Opera Fox Fables (2011) (libretto by the author and opera director Rhoda Levine. A winner of Boston Metro Opera's 2011 Contemporary Americana Competition. Premiered in 2012 by Stony Brook Opera, Timothy Long, conductor at Stony Brook University and at Symphony Space, New York
- Musical: Out! (libretto by Winston Clark. 1996–97) commissioned by the Connecticut Gay Men's Chorus
- Musical: Wonderland (1987) (libretto by Lewis Carroll and Ernst Muller) premiered by the Great Neck Summer Musical Theater Workshop, directed by Francine Harman
- Revue: Professionally Speaking (1986, written with Ernst Muller and the lawyer Frederic Block), Off-Broadway production directed by Tony Tanner. The song, "Tamara, Queen of the Nile" from Professionally Speaking has been recorded by Joan Morris with William Bolcom, as well as by Jody Karin Appelbaum with Marc-André Hamelin.

== Published articles ==
- "Honey in the Rock: Ways of Knowing and the Historical Imagination" The Musical Quarterly, Vol. 104 Issue 3-4, Fall-Winter 2021, pages 271-304
- "Toward a Theory of Popular Harmony", in Moore, Alan, ed. Critical Issues in Popular Musicology (Ashgate, 2007)(Originally published in In Theory Only, Vol. 4 No. 2, June 1978)
- "Randy Newman's Americana", in Middleton, Richard, ed. Reading Pop : Approaches to Textual Analysis in Popular Music, p. 27-57 (Oxford University Press, 2000) (originally published in Popular Music Vol. 7 No. 1, Fall 1988, pp. 1–26
- "Writing Ghost Notes: The Poetics and Politics of Transcription" in Schwartz, David, and Anahid Kassabian, ed., “Keeping Score” Music, Disciplinarity, Culture (University Press of Virginia Press, 1997), p. 169-203
- "In Search of Yaa Amponsah" in Straw, Will, et al., ed., Popular Music - Style and Identity (Montreal, Centre for Research on Canadian Cultural Industries and Institutions, 1995)
- "Pop Music's Middle Years", Music Educator's Journal, Vol. 66 No. 4, December 1979

== Discography ==
- Chamberosity (Jeffrey Forden, Linda Sinanian, Chrisine Doré): Peter Winkler: Trio for Horn Violin and Piano, 2016, self-published
- Colin Carr et al.: Stony Brook Soundings, Bridge Records 9319, 2010 (Fantasy for cello septet)
- Jody Karin Applebaum and Marc-Andre Hamelin: Serious Fun! Albany Records TROY 744, 2005 (Tamara, Queen of the Nile)
- Dorothea Cook and Peter Winkler: Silken Rags Music for violin by Peter Winkler. 2004; self-published
- Philip Rehfeldt, clarinet: Philip Rehfeldt plays new music, Advance Recordings FGR-81, 2001 ("Solitaire" for solo clarinet)
- The Connecticut Gay Men's Chorus, Winston Clark, director: Out! Original Cast Recording Nutmeg Records CD 2001, 1998
- Michael Lowenstern, Bass Clarinet Spasm New World Records CD 80468–2, 1996 ("Solitaire" for solo clarinet)
- Joan Morris and William Bolcom: Lime Jello- An American Cabaret RCA AM4-5830, 1986 (Tamara, Queen of the Nile)
