= Jabbar Collins =

American man (born 1972)

- Born: July 8, 1972 (age 54); Brooklyn, New York, U.S.
- Known for: Wrongful conviction

Jabbar Collins (born July 8, 1972) is an American man who served 16 years for a crime he did not commit. He was convicted of second-degree murder following the February 1994 death of Orthodox rabbi Abraham Pollack in Williamsburg, Brooklyn. The 20-year-old Collins, who lived in a nearby housing project, was arrested and charged with the murder. In March 1995, he was sentenced by a jury to 34-years-to-life in prison, sixteen of which he served.

In 2010, Collins was exonerated after a key witness recanted. The case was settled in 2014 for $13 million. It exposed questionable policies under the former Brooklyn district attorney, Charles J. Hynes, and Hynes' right-hand man Michael F. Vecchione.

The case has been used by Judge Frederic Block in support of a bill for the nation's first commission on prosecutorial conduct. The bill is pending approval by New York Governor Andrew Cuomo.

== Background ==
Collins was raised in Brooklyn, New York. At the time of the murder, he lived in a nearby housing project within the vicinity of the crime scene. A father of three, Collins was not able to finish high school but nonetheless earned a high-school equivalency diploma. He had been enrolled in college classes before his arrest.

Collins identifies as a Christian.

== Murder of Abraham Pollack ==
On a Sunday in early February 1994, 35-year-old Rabbi Abraham Pollack was fatally shot in a failed robbery attempt while collecting rent in a Brooklyn apartment building. The building superintendent witnessed the crime and ran to get assistance from the janitor, who intervened and was shot and seriously injured.

Those who knew Pollack described him as a devoted husband and father of nine who “treated everyone fairly” as a landlord and “didn’t hassle you” about late rent. His generosity and fairness also extended to his workers; Pollack had allowed the janitor, a formerly homeless man, to live in the building's basement in exchange for assisting the superintendent.

Approximately two weeks after the murder, the janitor spoke to detectives and an assistant district attorney. He revealed that he had cut the perpetrator on his right side with a knife while intervening during the crime. However, Collins did not exhibit any injury on his side when he voluntarily went to the 90th Precinct for a police interview 12 days following the murder.

Although both the building superintendent and janitor were eyewitnesses to the murder, neither positively identified Collins as the perpetrator in a police lineup. Collins also had a strong alibi placing him away from the scene of the crime.

Early police reports indicated that a few witnesses had stated that the perpetrator was a local drug dealer who had been under recent investigation, along with his brother, for another robbery. In the hour following the crime, the superintendent was shown photos of the drug dealer and his brother, who he said resembled the man who had murdered Rabbi Pollack. Another police report stated that one of the brothers had a scar “on [the] stomach area” — the same area where the janitor had cut the perpetrator with a knife.

Despite the incriminating evidence against other suspects, the police continued to focus their investigation on Collins after they had received an anonymous phone call implicating him. The case built against Collins relied substantially on three witnesses who were heavy drug users and whose accounts were not consistent with those of actual eyewitnesses.

== Trial ==
Collins was convicted in March 1995 after two witnesses testified to having seen him flee the crime scene. Another witness claimed that Collins had revealed his plans to rob Pollack while he was collecting rent.

=== Verdict and sentencing ===
Collins was sentenced to 34-years-to-life in prison for murder in the second degree.

However, according to court documents, police were aware of exculpatory information pertaining to Collins.

== Appeal ==
Sure of his innocence, Collins began fighting his conviction while at the Green Haven Correctional Facility, a maximum security state prison. Upon requesting documents through the Freedom of Information Act, Collins soon realized that some of these materials had not been provided to his trial lawyer at the time of his conviction. He decided to contact the witnesses whose testimonies implicated him in the murder of Rabbi Pollack. Collins soon found discrepancies in their stories and realized that the men had "received favorable treatment on pending cases in exchange for their testimony."

Witnesses admitted to having been enticed or threatened by the prosecution. One of these witnesses later testified at a hearing that when he tried to recant his statement implicating Collins before trial, a prosecutor had threatened to hit him with a coffee table. All three witnesses ultimately recanted their statements.

Collins also uncovered important prosecutorial misconduct based on the failure of the district attorney's office to turn over potentially exculpatory evidence to the defense. Ultimately, the city admitted to the withholding of this exculpatory evidence at the time of the 1995 trial, conceding that Collins’ conviction and sentencing "resulted from violations of his constitutional rights."

After failing to receive relief in state court, Collins filed a petition for habeas corpus in federal court and enlisted the help of attorney Joel B. Rudin. The defense asked for an order prohibiting retrial because of the gross misconduct. Following a one-day evidentiary hearing, the Kings County District Attorney's office decided not to oppose that outcome, perhaps because the prosecution witnesses were too compromised to retry the case. Even so, the office continued to allege that Collins was guilty.

In June 2010, officials at the Brooklyn District Attorney's office, who had previously stated that they would retry Collins, dismissed the case. However, a representative said that the office still believed Collins to be the killer.

=== Settlement ===
At the behest of Judge Frederic Block, who urged city and state officials to settle Collins’ wrongful conviction lawsuit before going to trial, the matter was settled for $3 million pursuant to the state's Unjust Conviction Act in July 2014.

Rudin commented, “Three million dollars is a lot of money, but it is a fraction of what Jabbar Collins is entitled to for 15 horrendous years in a maximum security state prison. We look forward now to concentrating totally on his much larger claim for damages against New York City.”

== Allegations of prosecutorial misconduct ==
=== Charles Hynes ===
As of July 2018, Collins was also suing former Brooklyn District Attorney Charles Hynes, former members of his office, and New York Police Department detectives for civil violations in federal court.

This lawsuit follows depositions conducted by Rudin in the murder case. During a December 2010 deposition, Hynes reportedly stated that when he ordered the case dismissed, he no longer believed that Collins was guilty and that there was no evidence connecting him to the murder. He also stated under questioning that there was “a failure of ethical responsibility by someone involved in the case.”

=== Michael Vecchione ===
The case also brought into question the conduct of former Assistant District Attorney Michael F. Vecchione, who is renowned as an aggressive prosecutor who has overseen many high-profile cases and is co-author of the book Friends of the Family. According to a New York Times article, Collins accused Vecchione of “playing God” in his threats against witnesses, elicitation of inaccurate testimonies and withholding of exculpatory evidence. The misconduct that Collins believed had deprived him of a fair trial included testimony by Angel Santos, one of the three witnesses who had testified in the 1995 trial. In his testimony at the aborted habeas corpus hearing, Santos recounted coercion by Vecchione at the initial trial, stating that he was not only threatened but also held in jail for a week until he testified.

The settlement spared the testimony of Vecchione, who in 2006 had signed a sworn affidavit denying that force or threats had been applied in obtaining witness testimonies. He was highly criticized for his conduct in the case by Hynes’ successor, Kenneth Thompson. Vecchione retired in December 2013.

=== Judicial significance: Bill for Commission on Prosecutorial Conduct ===
According to a New York Daily News editorial, federal judge Frederic Block (who had presided over the settled civil case) was troubled by the lack of accountability in the matter. While he ruled that the city could be held liable, he was forced to dismiss the claims against the prosecutor and the district attorney because of prosecutorial immunity.

Block noted that, as of July 30, 2018, the state and city taxpayers had paid $13 million in settlements. Despite his "egregious behavior," the prosecutor has neither been forced to pay for the settlement or face any punishment. Block maintains that it is not uncommon for wrongful conviction cases across New York to stem from “a whole array of prosecutorial misconduct” yet simultaneously cost taxpayers hundreds of millions of dollars “for the many years the innocent defendants spent in jail.” Prosecutors, he notes, have curiously remained largely unscathed.

== Personal life ==
During the period of Collins' incarceration, both of his grandmothers died.

Collins lives in New Jersey.

In prison, Collins spent eight years helping his fellow inmates by acting as a legal research instructor. Since being released, he has worked as a legal analyst at Rudin's office. He currently works as a legal analyst for Horizon Research Services.

In 2017, Collins appeared on NY1 to discuss wrongful convictions with his legal partner, Rita Dave.

In 2023, Collins was named to NYC police corruption watchdog panel.
