= Boston Metro Opera =

American opera company

Boston Metro Opera was a semi-professional American opera company based in the Greater Boston area of Massachusetts. The company specialized in contemporary works and operated from 2008 to 2015. It also sponsored and ran the Boston-International Contempo Festival and its associated International Composers' Competition.

== History ==
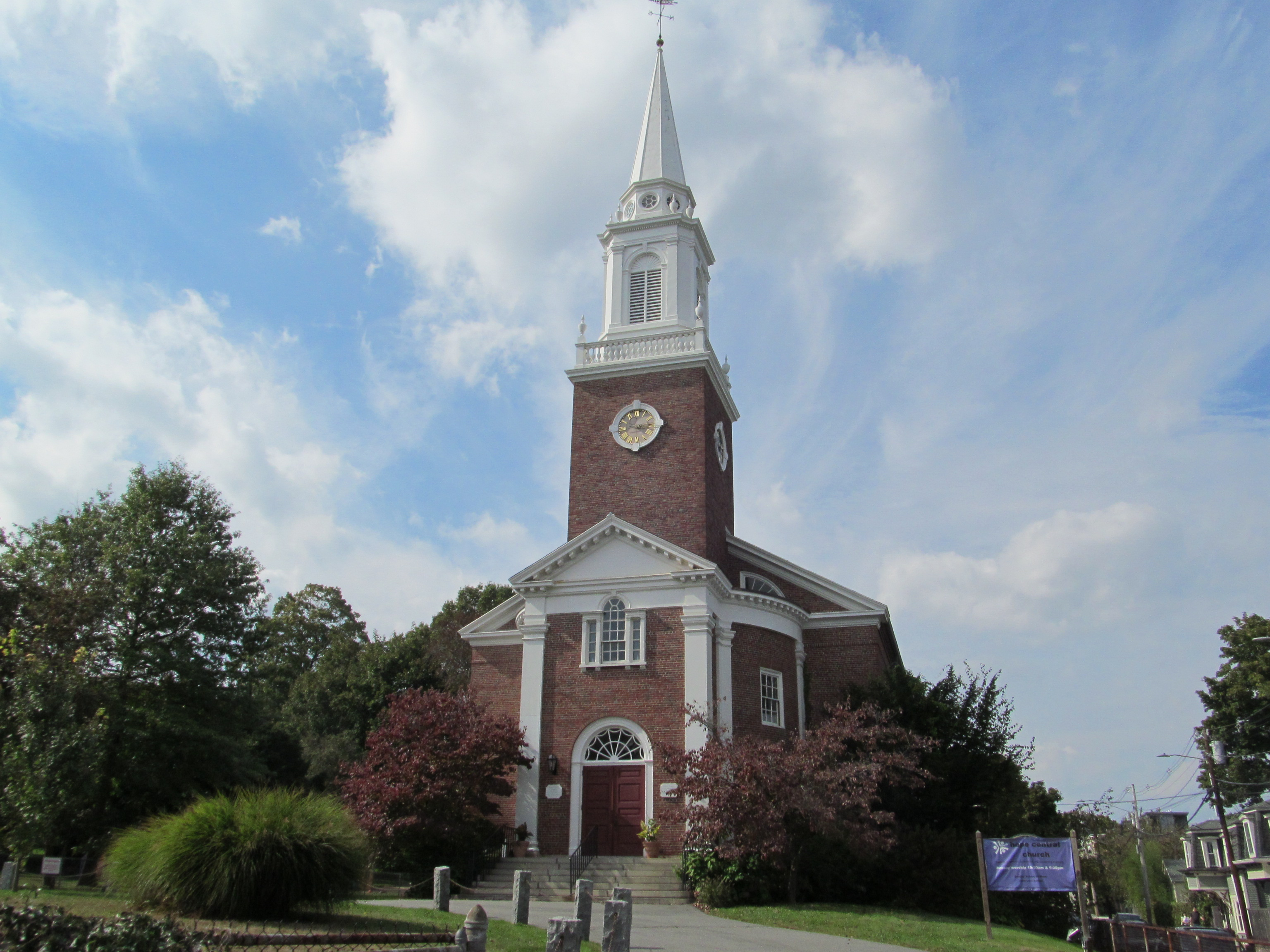
Hope Central Church in Jamaica Plain, one of several churches in the Boston area where Boston Metro Opera staged their productions

Boston Metro Opera was founded in 2008 by the tenor Christopher Aaron Smith who remained its General and Artistic Director throughout the company's existence. It was incorporated as a non-profit company in 2009 and gave its first performances that year, a series of concerts. Although in its early days the company performed three one-act operettas by Offenbach, it soon turned to the contemporary works that became the hallmark of its repertoire. After its first season the company received 61 new operas and over 200 song cycles and choral works from composers hoping to be performed by the company. By 2013 Boston Metro Opera had produced ninety-four new works, many of them premieres.

Over the years, the company developed several initiatives including Opera on Site, an interactive pay-per-view service that streamed Boston Metro's live and archived performances, Opera Puppets which produced operatic puppet shows, and its most prominent initiative the Boston-International Contempo Festival.

When Christopher Smith announced his departure from Boston Metro Opera in August 2015 to return to his native Wisconsin, the board of directors voted to suspend the company's operations indefinitely.

== Repertory ==
=== 2012–2013 ===
- Scenes from Hamlet (David Edgar Walther / William Shakespeare)
- Opera a la carte Gala

=== 2011–2012 ===
- Happy Birthday, David Walther
  - Blessings on Your Home (David Edgar Walther / Drew Hubbard)
  - "Halloween" from The Swallow and The Prince (David Edgar Walther / Oscar Wilde)
  - "Laertes' Lament" from Hamlet (David Edgar Walther / William Shakespeare)
  - Nine Spirituals (Traditional / Arr. David Edgar Walther
  - "Second Love" from Edward II (David Edgar Walther / Christopher Marlowe)
  - "Wolf's Ear" from Edward II (David Edgar Walther / Christopher Marlowe)
  - "KeHoTeque's Dream" from Antigon (David Edgar Walther)
  - "KeHoTeque's Death" from Antigon (David Edgar Walther)
  - "Victory" from Edward II (David Edgar Walther / Christopher Marlowe)
  - "Poison Cup" from Edward II (David Edgar Walther / Christopher Marlowe)
  - "Heaven" from The Island Curse (David Edgar Walther)
  - Six Songs of Innocence and Experience (David Edgar Walther / William Blake)
  - Eclipse (David Edgar Walther)
  - Cal'mus Songs (David Edgar Walther / Walt Whitman)
- Happy Birthday, Daron Hagen
  - Figments (Daron Hagen / Alice Wirth Gray)
  - Muldoon Songs (Daron Hagen / Paul Muldoon)
  - Merrill Songs (Daron Hagen / James Merrill)
  - Echo's Songs (Daron Hagen / Various)
- Angel of the Amazon (Evan Mack)

=== 2010–2011 ===
- Glory Denied (Tom Cipullo)
- .Gabriel (Robert J. Bradshaw)
- The Gift of the Magi (David Conte / Nicholas Giardini)
- Amahl & The Night Visitors (Gian Carlo Menotti)
- Antigon (David Edgar Walther)
- Venus & Adonis (Zachary Wadsworth / William Shakespeare)

=== 2009–2010 ===
- Fables (David Edgar Walther)
- The Face on the Barroom Floor (Henry Mollicone)
- A Hand of Bridge (Samuel Barber / Gian Carlo Menotti)
- Le Violoneux (Jacques Offenbach / Eugène Mestépès and Émile Chevalet)
- Les deux pecheurs (Jacques Offenbach / CD Depeuty & E Bourget)
- Lischen et Fritzchen (Jacques Offenbach / Paul Boisselot and Poly Henrion)
- Les deux aveugles (Jacques Offenbach / Jules Moinaux)
- Inaugural Concert Series

== Boston-International Contempo Festival ==
Formerly called the Contemporary Americana Festival, the Boston-International Contempo Festival was a new music festival that began in 2010. Sponsored by Boston Metro Opera, it was held annually and showcased new works in opera, musical theatre, choral music, and art song. The works chosen to be performed were submitted to the festival's International Composers' Competition. The competition had several awards in each of the four categories of vocal music, among them Mainstage Awards which guaranteed fully staged performances as part of Boston Metro Opera's regular season and Festival Awards which guaranteed a concert performance during the Contempo Festival. In some years, an additional Gold Medal was awarded in each category to works judged to be of outstanding quality. The 2014 competition (the last one held before the company's demise) received over 625 works submitted by composers from more than 120 countries. By that time the choral music category had been discontinued.

Past competition awardees have included:

- Katy Abbott, Gold Medal in Art Song for The Domestic Sublime (2011)
- Nathalie Anderson, Mainstage Award in Opera for A Scandal in Bohemia (2012)
- Robert J. Bradshaw, Mainstage Award in Opera for .Gabriel (2010)
- Jorge Grundman, Director's Choice Award in Opera for God's Sketches (2014)
- Alice Ho, Merit Award in Opera for The Imp of the Perverse (2013)
- Sarah Hutchings, Festival Award in Opera for Remember Me (2012)
- Evan Mack, Mainstage Award in Opera for Angel of the Amazon (2011)
- Deirdre McKay, Director's Choice Award in Opera for Driven (2013)
- Peter K. Winkler, Festival Award in Opera for Fox Fables (2011)
