= Keith Warner =

British opera director

- Born: 6 December 1956 (age 69); London
- Citizenship: British
- Occupations: opera director, designer and translator

Keith Warner (born 6 December 1956) is a British opera director, designer and translator. He is noted for his stagings of Richard Wagner's operas.

== Early years ==
Warner was born in London and went to Woodhouse School in Finchley, North London, and then studied English and drama at the University of Bristol from 1975–78. He was awarded an Honorary Doctorate of Music by the University of Bristol in 2017.

He also worked as an actor, a teacher of drama therapy and a fringe theatre director. He joined English National Opera in 1981, working as revival director, staff director and later as the associate director until 1989. In 1985, he also worked as associate director for Scottish Opera.

== Career ==
In the late 1980s and early 1990s, Warner combined the roles of director of productions for New Sussex Opera, artistic director for Nexus Opera and associate artistic director of Opera Omaha.

In 1984, he served as associate director of Scottish Opera, directing production of Gilbert and Sullivan’s Iolanthe for the main stage, along with re-stagings of Werther and The Magic Flute. He also directed Tosca and Carmen for Opera-Go-Round, the company’s touring unit.

From 1985 to 1989, as associate director of English National Opera, he directed productions of Rossini’s Moses, Dargomyzhsky’s The Stone Guest, Sondheim’s Pacific Overtures, and Massenet’s Werther for the English National Opera (ENO) at The Coliseum. While at ENO, he established the company's first education unit, which later evolved into the Baylis Programme.

In 1989, Warner began freelance work, directing in Germany. From 1990 to 1995, he worked primarily in North America, directing operas such as Un Ballo in Maschera in Toronto, Carmen for Minnesota Opera. During this period, following a production of “Werther” together in Vancouver, he began a long series of collaborations with the conductor, Sir Antonio Pappano.In 1999 he directed “Lohengrin” at the Bayreuth Festival with Pappano conducting. In the early 2000s, he focused on Ring Cycle for the New National Theatre in Tokyo.

Later, a separate production of “The Ring” at The Royal Opera House, Covent Garden between 2004 -2007, also filmed in its entirety by the BBC. (Revived for the Olympic Arts Festival in 2012, and again in 2018). He won the 2003 Olivier award for his production of Alban Berg’s “Wozzeck” at the ROH, Covent Garden.

Over the past two decades, his work with various companies has been pivotal, including directing thirteen productions at Theater an der Wien, twelve at Oper Frankfurt, and five at The Semper Oper in Dresden.

Warner was appointed Artistic Director of The Royal Danish Opera 2011/12, where he directed “Don Giovanni”, “Wozzeck”, “Parsifal”, and “Albert Herring” and the world premiere of Penderecki’s 2nd version of “The Devils of Loudon” (a joint production with Warsaw). taking up the post in July 2011, he resigned after six months, along with conductor and music director Jakub Hrůša, as a result of problems with funding and management issues.

In 2022, his production of “Die Meistersinger von Nürnberg” in Vienna received a 30-minute standing ovation at its premiere.

Theatre work includes a double bill of Cocteau’s “La Voix Humaine” and Beckett’s “Krapp’s Last Tape” (Bloomsbury Festival), Georg Kaiser’s and Kurt Weill’s “Silverlake”, (Wexford Festival) and Lerner and Lowe’s “My Fair Lady” (Houston, USA; and on tour). His production of Sondheim’s “Passion” (Montepulciano) was named by Matt Wolff in The New York Times as one of the four best theatre productions in Europe in 2019. Shakespeare’s “King Lear” at Grange Park Festival, using only opera singers in the cast proved an outstanding success.

== Writing ==
Warner is also a writer, supplying the book and lyrics for "Scoring A Century", an operetta, which began a long series of works with composer, David Blake. Originally commissioned by Portland Opera, it received its world premiere at The Crescent Theatre Birmingham,

Anna Picard in The Sunday Independent, 14 March 2010, heralded it: "Directed by Warner and conducted by Lionel Friend, Birmingham Conservatoire's exuberant production revealed a work that is as much a history of music as it is a history of politics, as Blake's sentimental waltzes and sassy cabaret songs cede to a series of mini-operas in the styles of Berg and Stravinsky and a Shosta- kovichian show trial. This is a terrific choice for an institution that prides itself on producing voices for music theatre and opera, and a work that should be seen at the Young Vic or the Donmar ." Nine years later, a revival in London divided critics more, some of whom called it 'pretentious', embarrassing, and 'unwieldy, overlong and stylistically diffuse'., whereas others continued to welcome it. Also, in by far the fullest appraisal, Claire Seymour, also welcomed it in Opera Today (Sept 2019), "Scoring a Century, British Youth Opera at the Peacock Theatre.

Other music-theatre pieces followed: an operetta-like version of Bergmann's "Fanny and Alexander", "Icarus", performed at the 2016 Montepulciano Festival in Italy. 41st Cantiere di Montepulciano.

about which Roberto del Nista wrote, "All credit to Warner and Blake for putting on stage stories that are normally the preserve of television and the Internet".

"Four Modern Myths" comprises four 30 minute monodramas: Medea's Cell – for soprano; Persephone's Rounds – for mezzo; Narcissus Reflects – for tenor; and the Twin Trials of Hercules – for bass-baritone. There is also an optional epilogue for all four singers. And "Something About Love" (2024).

In addition, he has taught drama and acting and served as a visiting director at the University of Ann Arbor, MI, and the University of Vermillion , SD.

Throughout his career, Warner has directed over 200 operas, plays, and musicals.
