= Connecticut Gay Men's Chorus =

Background information
- Also known as: CTGMC
- Origin: Connecticut, United States
- Genres: Broadway; choral; classical; jazz; popular
- Years active: 1987–present
- Website: www.ctgmc.org

The Connecticut Gay Men's Chorus (CGMC) is Connecticut's first and, until 2012, its only performing arts organization composed of openly gay men — though their membership rules have been changed, and now any person who self-identifies as male may join, regardless of sexual orientation or preference. It was begun in 1986 by a small group of gay men under the directorship of Robert Read and led by him until 1992. Since 1986 the Chorus has rehearsed in the gymnasium of St. Thomas's Episcopal Church in New Haven.

From 1993 to 2007 the CGMC also performed in September in Provincetown, Massachusetts, a town with a large gay population. The shows, sponsored by the Provincetown Business Guild, were sold out every year since the first year. The CGMC is a member of GALA, the Gay and Lesbian Association of Choruses, and the Arts Council of Greater New Haven.

== History ==
=== 20th Century ===
The first concert given by the CGMC was in 1987. After performing for several years in small venues like churches in New Haven and Hartford, the CGMC moved into larger commercial performance spaces like the Shubert Theater in New Haven and the Bushnell Theater in Hartford under the long-time directorship of Winston Clark, who became music director in the fall of 1992. Clark changed the direction of the Chorus from "standing on risers and singing" to fully staged, fully costumed musical revues, and decreased the politically themed content in favor of more general entertainment in a successful effort to attract a larger audience, including the non-gay community. The Chorus became known for humor, as mentioned in a 1999 article in The New York Times, "As is customary with the Gay Men’s Chorus, parody rules."

A major turning point came in May 1995, when the CGMC brought its successful musical revue, "Victory Canteen", to the Shubert Theater. The revue, a salute to the United States armed forces during World War II, had been performed seven times at the Educational Center for the Arts, a much smaller theater in New Haven. When it was discovered that the Shubert Theater was available in May 1995, the 50th anniversary of V-E Day, the CGMC took advantage of the opportunity to mount the show there. New Haven's mayor, John DeStefano, Jr., issued an official proclamation that the day of the performance was "Connecticut Gay Men’s Chorus Day". Many local and state dignitaries were in attendance at the performance, which was the first time the CGMC had ever performed at the Shubert Theater. The show was sold out. Since that time, nearly all of the Chorus's New Haven performances have been at the Shubert Theater.

Another important event was the composition and debut performance of Out! The Whole Story, a full-length musical based on the true coming-out stories of various Chorus members. With libretto by Winston Clark and music by Peter K. Winkler, it was originally conceived as the second act of a two-act program. Out! was expanded into a full-length musical, complete with choreography, and the full-length program was presented as part of the following year's performance season. A 25-minute version was also presented at the 1996 GALA Festival in Tampa, Florida, to a tumultuous reception. A compact disc of the full-length version was produced, and one song from Out!, entitled "I Have Something to Tell You", was nominated for a Gay and Lesbian American Music Awards (GLAMA) Award in 1998 in the Cast Recording category.

In 1986 the Chorus incorporated as Connecticut Gay Men's Chorus, Inc., a not-for-profit 501(c)(3) corporation. In 2000 the legal name was changed to Charter Oak Performing Arts, Inc. The Connecticut Gay Men's Chorus and CGMC are still used as names under which the corporation does business.

=== 21st Century ===
Another milestone came in 2002, when for the first time the Chorus performed in the then brand-new Belding Theater, part of the Bushnell Theater complex in Hartford, Connecticut. The CGMC had outgrown its previous Hartford venue, the Wallace Stevens Theater at The Hartford complex. Since that time, all Hartford shows have been at either the Belding Theater or the larger Mortensen Hall, both part of the Bushnell Theater complex.

The CGMC also performs at many fundraisers for other nonprofit groups, and at local events such as the Molson Summertime Street Festival in New Haven in 1992 and the Hartford gay pride march for several years. The Chorus also gives away blocks of tickets to performances to social organizations whose members might otherwise not be able to afford the price of a ticket.

The Chorus has performed with guest artists such as George Howe, Mark Hardy, Tommy Femia, Julie Halston, and Julie Wilson, and has given joint performances with Another Octave/Connecticut Women's Chorus, the Boston Gay Men's Chorus, and the Baltimore Gay Men's Chorus. It has also performed at benefits with Harvey Fierstein, Cyndi Lauper, and Scot Haney.

Since 2002, the main fundraiser for the chorus has been "Bingomania", a monthly bingo game with entertainment, hosted by "Joan Crawford", a man dressed up as the famous movie star. As many as 400 people attend the monthly bingo/shows, which have themes such as "Redneck Bingomania", "Bad Romance Bingomania", and "Easter Bonnet Bingomania". The bingo is staffed by Chorus members, and prizes are donated by local businesses. "Joan Crawford" now has over 2000 friends on 'her' Facebook page.

In 2004 the Chorus merited a full page in the book How the Homosexuals Saved Civilization by Cathy Crimmins, as an example of "how gay-tolerant small towns in Connecticut have become."{Page 52}

In April 2013 three sold-out performances took place at Lyric Hall, a small, restored turn-of-the-20th-century theater in the historic Westville section of New Haven. In December 2013 two sold-out performances occurred in the 325-seat theater at the Co-Operative Arts & Humanities High School in New Haven.

April 2015 saw the CGMC perform the New England premiere of "I Am Harvey Milk", an oratorio with words and music by Andrew Lippa. The two performances at the Co-Operative Arts & Humanities High School in New Haven were both sold out.
