= Hector Gonzalez (judge) =

American judge (born 1964)

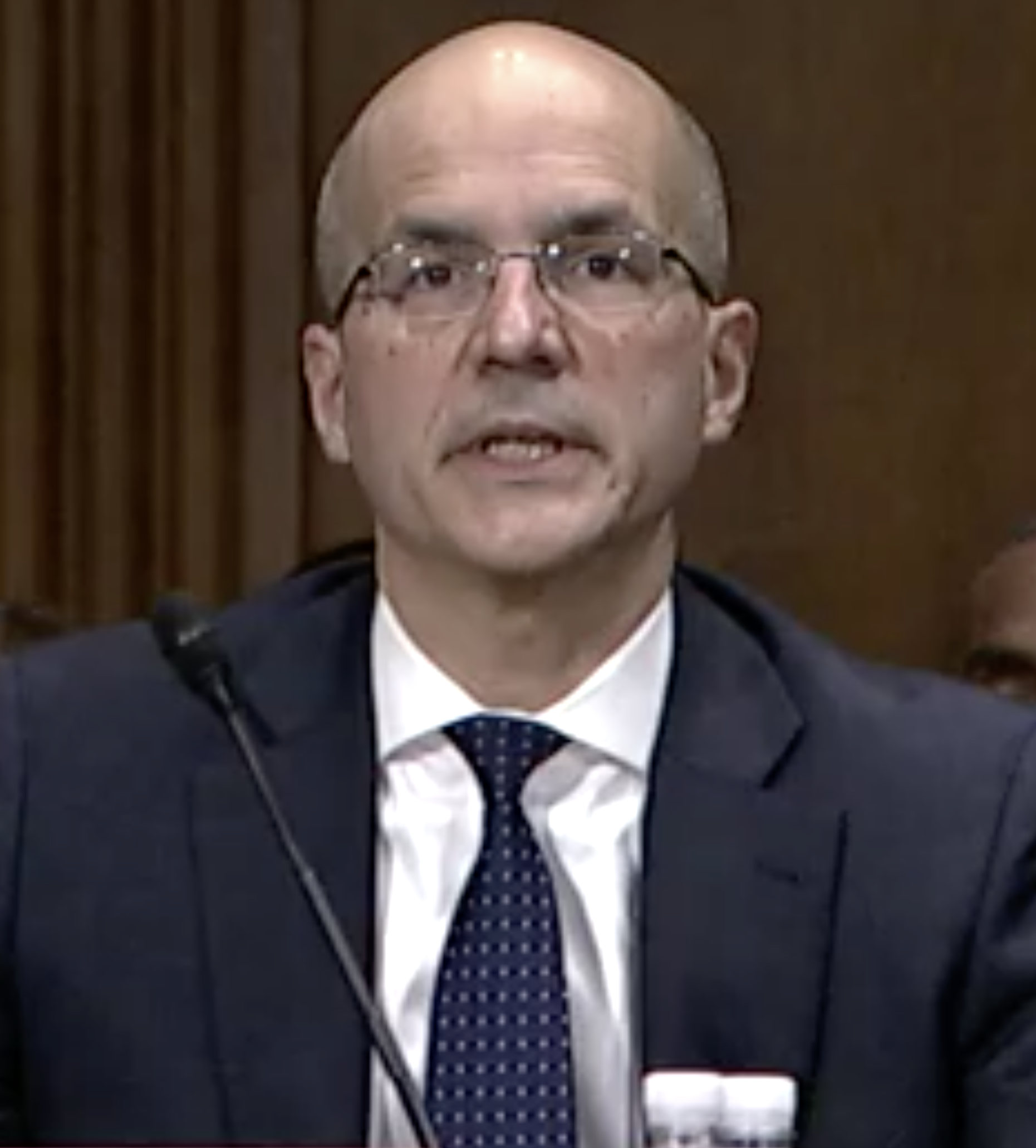

Judge of the United States District Court for the Eastern District of New York
- Incumbent
- Assumed office April 18, 2022
- Appointed by: Joe Biden
- Preceded by: Brian Cogan

Personal details
- Born: 1964 (age 61–62) Havana, Cuba
- Education: Manhattan College (BS); University of Pennsylvania (JD)

Military service
- Allegiance: United States
- Branch/service: United States Army
- Years of service: July 1, 1982–August 4, 1983
- Rank: Officer Cadet
- Unit: United States Military Academy

Hector Gonzalez (born 1964) is an American lawyer who is a United States district judge of the United States District Court for the Eastern District of New York.

== Education ==
Gonzalez served in the United States Army from 1982 to 1983 as a cadet at the United States Military Academy. He later earned his Bachelor of Science from Manhattan College in 1985 and his Juris Doctor from the University of Pennsylvania Law School in 1988, where he was an editor of the University of Pennsylvania Law Review. He earned his Master of Arts in criminal justice from City University of New York in 1995.

== Legal career ==
From 1990 to 1994, Gonzalez served as an Assistant District Attorney in the Manhattan District Attorney's Office, and from 1994 to 1999, Gonzalez served as an Assistant United States Attorney in the United States Attorney's Office for the Southern District of New York, where he was Chief of the Narcotics Unit. From 1999 to 2011, he was a partner at the law firm of Mayer Brown in their New York City office.

In 2002, New York City Mayor Michael Bloomberg named Gonzalez as Chairman of the Civilian Complaint Review Board, an agency that investigates charges of police misconduct. During his time as chairman, the review board recommended increased training for police officers in order to prevent inappropriate strip searches. From 2011 to 2022, he was a partner at Dechert, LLP in New York City where he served as chair of the firm's Global Litigation Group.

In 2014, New York Governor Andrew Cuomo considered nominating Gonzalez to be a judge on the New York Court of Appeals, but nominated Eugene M. Fahey instead.

== Federal judicial service ==
=== Expired nomination to district court under Trump ===
On August 12, 2020, President Donald Trump announced his intent to nominate Gonzalez to serve as a United States district judge for the United States District Court for the Eastern District of New York as part of a bipartisan package of nominees that included Ryan McAllister. On September 8, 2020, his nomination was sent to the U.S. Senate. President Trump nominated Gonzalez to the seat vacated by Judge Brian Cogan, who assumed senior status on June 12, 2020. On January 3, 2021, his nomination was returned to the President under Rule XXXI, Paragraph 6 of the United States Senate.

=== Renomination to district court under Biden ===
On December 15, 2021, President Joe Biden renominated Gonzalez to the same seat. On January 12, 2022, a hearing on his nomination was held before the Senate Judiciary Committee. On February 10, 2022, his nomination was reported out of committee by a 13–9 vote. On March 16, 2022, the United States Senate invoked cloture on his nomination by a 52–44 vote. On March 23, 2022, his nomination was confirmed by a 52–45 vote. He received his judicial commission on April 18, 2022.

== See also ==
- List of Hispanic and Latino American jurists

Legal offices
Preceded by Brian Cogan	Judge of the United States District Court for the Eastern District of New York; 2022–present	Incumbent
