= Brian Cogan =

American judge (born 1954)

Senior Judge of the United States District Court for the Eastern District of New York
- Incumbent
- Assumed office June 12, 2020

Judge of the United States District Court for the Eastern District of New York
- In office June 7, 2006 – June 12, 2020
- Appointed by: George W. Bush
- Preceded by: Frederic Block
- Succeeded by: Hector Gonzalez

Personal details
- Born: Brian Mark Cogan; April 22, 1954 (age 72) Chicago, Illinois, U.S.
- Education: University of Illinois (BA); Cornell University (JD)

Brian M. Cogan (born April 22, 1954) is a senior United States district judge of the United States District Court for the Eastern District of New York. He was appointed to that court by George W. Bush in 2006, and took senior status in 2020.

== Education and career ==
Cogan was born in 1954 in Chicago. He graduated from University of Illinois with a Bachelor of Arts in 1975 and received his Juris Doctor from Cornell Law School in 1979, where he was an editor of the Cornell Law Review. Following graduation, Cogan clerked for Judge Sidney Aronovitz of the United States District Court for the Southern District of Florida. Prior to his appointment to the federal bench, Cogan was a partner of Stroock & Stroock & Lavan in New York City.

=== Federal judicial service ===
Cogan was nominated by President George W. Bush on January 25, 2006, to a seat vacated by Frederic Block. He was confirmed by the United States Senate on May 4, 2006, and received his commission on June 7, 2006. Cogan assumed senior status on June 12, 2020.

=== Notable cases ===
United States v. Guzmán

Joaquín "El Chapo" Guzmán, a Mexican drug lord and former leader of the Sinaloa Cartel, was extradited from Mexico to the United States in January 2017, on charges including drug trafficking, money laundering, and murder. The trial began on November 5, 2018, and lasted until February 12, 2019, when the jury returned a guilty verdict on all counts.

United States v. Harun

Ibrahim Adnan “Spin Ghul” Harun, an al Qaeda operative, was extradited from Italy to the United States in October 2012 on charges including conspiracy to murder U.S. nationals, conspiracy to bomb a U.S. government facility, conspiracy to provide, and providing material support to al Qaeda, and use of explosives in connection with a felony offense. Harun was sentenced to life in prison on February 16, 2018.

United States v. Sun

Linda Sun, a former aide to New York Governors Cuomo and Hochul, and her husband, Chris Hu, were indicted in 2024 on charges including violations of the Foreign Agents Registration Act, visa fraud, wire fraud, conspiracy to commit bank fraud, conspiracy to commit money laundering, money laundering, and tax evasion. After a five-week trial and two weeks of deliberations, the jury could not reach a unanimous verdict, and a mistrial was declared.

== Sources ==
Legal offices
Preceded by Frederic Block	Judge of the United States District Court for the Eastern District of New York; 2006–2020	Succeeded by Hector Gonzalez
