= Sarah Hutchings =

American composer of opera and art song

- Born: Sarah Reneer; September 27, 1984 (age 41); Lexington, Kentucky
- Origin: United States
- Occupation: Composer

Sarah Hutchings née Reneer (born September 27, 1984) is an American composer of contemporary opera, art song, and choral works.

== Life and career ==
Hutchings was born Sarah Reneer in Lexington, Kentucky, on September 27, 1984, and raised in Durham, North Carolina, where she had her first music lessons at the age of four.

Hutchings received her Bachelor of Music degree in 2007 from Western Carolina University, her Master of Music degree from Florida State University in 2010, and her Doctor of Musical Arts from University of Cincinnati College-Conservatory of Music in 2013. She has studied under Ladislav Kubík, Clifton Callendar, Michael Fiday, Joel Hoffman, and Ellen Taaffe Zwilich.

Hutchings is married to operatic baritone Mitchell Hutchings and lives in Boca Raton, Florida.

== Works ==
Hutchings's compositions include four short operas, art songs, and a choral work.

=== Operas ===
- Remember Me, an operatic scene for soprano and baritone with piano accompaniment, received a Festival Award from Boston Metro Opera's International Composers' Competition in 2012 and was performed at the Robert J. Werner Recital Hall, University of Cincinnati in 2013.
- Styria, for nine voices and full orchestra with a libretto based the Gothic novel Carmilla, was composed for her doctoral dissertation. It was performed in concert version at the Robert J. Werner Recital Hall, University of Cincinnati in 2013.
- Twenty Minutes or Less was commissioned by the Washington National Opera as part of its "American Opera Initiative". It was performed in a semi-staged version in December 2015 at the Kennedy Center Terrace Theater along with two other 20-minute operas commissioned by the initiative, David Clay Mettens's Alexandra and Christopher Weiss's Service Provider.
- Rodman in North Korea, scored for three soloists, SATB chorus and chamber orchestra, is a satirical opera based on Dennis Rodman's 2013 visit to North Korea. It was given a workshop performance by Houghton Lyric Theater at Houghton College in 2015.

=== Art song ===
Stabat Mater Seorsa world premiere.

- Songs of Mortality I-III is a song cycle set to texts by Edgar Allan Poe. It was composed as Hutchings's Master of Music dissertation between 2008 and 2009.
- On Faith and Life is a song cycle composed in 2010. It was performed at the Robert J. Werner Recital Hall, University of Cincinnati in 2013.
- Ode to Free Beer is an art song composed in 2011 and set to partial text from Jeff Gundy's poem "March Ode".
- Vestige of a Woman is a song cycle composed in 2012. It was one of the finalists for the National Association of Teachers of Singing's 2014 Art Song Composition Award.
- In Seasons of Life's Pursuit is a song cycle for baritone and piano. It was premiered by Mitchell Hutchings on April 26, 2016, at Hatch Recital Hall, Eastman School of Music and was one of the finalists for the National Association of Teachers of Singing's 2017 Art Song Composition Award.

=== Choral ===
- Stabat Mater Seorsa for women's chorus (SSAA) was first performed on October 18, 2019, in Boca Raton by the Florida Atlantic University Women's Chorus under the direction of Stacie Lee Rossow.

== Reception ==
Alex Baker in Parterre Box described the score Hutchings's opera Twenty Minutes or Less as having "imaginatively captured the tonal shifts, moving from spiky, rollicking ensembles to a series of introspective Bernstein-esque arias." In her review of the opera, Anne Midgette of the Washington Post, wrote that Hutchings composed "appealingly for instruments, with a sinuous muted trombone adding a big-band flavor, but needed work setting the text so that it could be understood."
