= Rhoda Levine =

American opera director and choreographer (1932–2026)

- Born: Rhoda Jane Levine; June 15, 1932; New York City, U.S.
- Died: January 6, 2026 (aged 93); New York City, U.S.
- Education: Bard College (BA)
- Occupations: Opera director; choreographer; educator
- Years active: 1975–2026
- Employers: Manhattan School of Music; Mannes College
- Awards: National Institute for Music Theater Award

Rhoda Jane Levine (June 15, 1932 – January 6, 2026) was an American opera director, choreographer and a faculty member at several schools of music.

== Early life and career ==
Levine was born in New York City on June 15, 1932. She wrote the libretto for Opus Number Zoo by Luciano Berio and also wrote children's books. She was the artistic director of Play It By Ear, an improvisational opera group. She was the recipient of the National Institute for Music Theater Award. She got her BA at Bard College.

In the summer, she taught at the John Duffy Composers Institute, in Norfolk, Virginia.

Levine was a faculty member at the Curtis Institute of Music, Yale School of Drama, The Juilliard School, and Northwestern University, and taught at Manhattan School of Music from 1992 and Mannes College and was a frequent guest teacher and visiting artist at Tisch School of the Arts at NYU.

== Personal life and death ==
Levine died in New York City, aged 93. She left no immediate survivors.

== Operas directed by Rhoda Levine ==
Opera	Company	Year	Notes
Porgy and Bess	Cape Town Opera	1996	South African premiere
Der Kaiser von Atlantis	Chicago Opera Theatre		Viktor Ullmann
Orpheus Descending	Chicago Opera Theatre		World premiere
The Good Soldier Schweik	Glimmerglass Opera		
Lizzie Borden	Glimmerglass Opera		
Rigoletto	Glimmerglass Opera		
Little Women	Glimmerglass Opera		By Adamo
Susannah	Kentucky Opera		
The Marriage of Figaro	Kentucky Opera		
Der Kaiser von Atlantis	Nederlandse Opera	1975	Viktor Ullmann; world premiere
Le Nozze di Figaro	Nederlandse Opera	1986	
Lulu	Nederlandse Opera		
The Good Soldier Schweik	Nederlandse Opera		
From the House of the Dead	Nederlandse Opera		
The Love for Three Oranges	Nederlandse Opera		
The Fantasticks	Nederlandse Opera		
Macbeth	Nederlandse Opera		
Of Mice and Men	Nederlandse Opera		
The Marriage of Figaro	Nederlandse Opera		
Medea	New York City Opera	1982	Directing debut
Of Mice and Men	New York City Opera	1997	
Little Women	New York City Opera	2003	By Adamo
Lizzie Borden	New York City Opera	1996	
Rigoletto	New York City Opera		
The Ballad of Baby Doe	New York City Opera		
X, The Life and Times of Malcolm X	New York City Opera		World premiere; by Anthony Davis
From the House of the Dead	New York City Opera		American stage premiere; by Janacek
Die Soldaten	New York City Opera		By Zimmermann
Mathis der Maler	New York City Opera	1995	
Wakonda's Dream	Opera Omaha		By Anthony Davis
Treemonisha	Opera Theatre of St. Louis	2000	
La Bohème	Opera Theatre of St. Louis		
A Death in the Family	Opera Theatre of St. Louis	1986	
Under the Double Moon	Opera Theatre of St. Louis		World premiere
Madama Butterfly	San Diego Opera	1982	
La Bohème	San Diego Opera	1985	
Lucia di Lammermoor	San Diego Opera	1989	
Of Mice and Men	San Diego Opera	1999	
Figaro	Santa Fe Opera		
L'histoire du Soldat	Santa Fe Opera	1987	
Kabbalah			By Stewart Wallace
Where the Wild Things Are			Music composed by Oliver Knussen

Additionally, she directed productions at Belgium's Opéra National; Scottish Opera; San Francisco Opera; Festival of the Two Worlds; Cabrillo Festival; and Holland Festival, and helmed and choreographed productions on and off-Broadway, in London's West End, and for CBS and WNET.

== Books ==
- Levine, Rhoda (1961). Prince What-Shall-I-Do. Illustrated by Sandy Wilson. New York Review of Books. ISBN 978-1-59017-354-1. OCLC 30222994.
- Levine, Rhoda (1962). Arthur. OCLC 1651323.
- Levine, Rhoda (1963). The Quiet Story. New York Review of Books. ISBN 978-1-59017-354-1. OCLC 1415095.
- Levine, Rhoda (1963). Three Ladies beside the Sea. Illustrated by Edward Gorey. OCLC 1203946.
  - Republished by the New York Review of Books in June 2010.
- Levine, Rhoda (1964). Harrison Loved His Umbrella. OCLC 1415085.
- Levine, Rhoda (1968). He was There from the Day We Moved in. Illustrated by Edward Gorey. New York Review of Books. ISBN 978-1-59017-354-1. OCLC 87510.
  - Levine, Rhoda (1977). Er war da und saß im Garten (in German). Illustrated by Edward Gorey. New York Review of Books. ISBN 978-1-59017-354-1. OCLC 1203944.
  - Levine, Rhoda (1977). Il etait la, il attendait (in French). Illustrated by Edward Gorey. New York Review of Books. ISBN 978-1-59017-354-1. OCLC 301610899.
  - Levine, Rhoda (2012). He was There from the Day We Moved in. Illustrated by Edward Gorey. New York Review of Books. ISBN 978-1-59017-515-6.
- Levine, Rhoda (1969). The Herbert Situation. New York Review of Books. ISBN 978-1-59017-354-1. OCLC 2156186.
