= .Gabriel =

Opera by Robert J. Bradshaw

.Gabriel (pronounced "dot Gabriel") is an opera in two acts (to be performed continuously) written by American composer Robert J. Bradshaw. The libretto, also by Bradshaw, was inspired by the composer's online experiences with social networking websites, instant messaging, chat rooms and email correspondence. The opera was commissioned by the Australian Trumpet Guild for performance at the 35th Annual Conference of the International Trumpet Guild, 2010, Sydney, Australia. Also in 2010, the composition was awarded an American Music Center Composer Assistance Program Grant and was named winner of a 2009 Boston Metro Opera Mainstage Award.

== About the opera ==
Program notes (included in the published score) state:

.Gabriel is an allegory for society's increasing perception of connection to the world through the Internet, while in fact separating ourselves from physical interaction. The false perception of safety and protection (and ultimate isolation) of electronic relationships at times promotes posting statements or images people would never consider saying (or doing) in person. Although Principal interacts with the other members of the cast, they never come in contact with each other. A scrim represents the physical barrier (the computer screen) that separates Principal from the living world around her."

.Gabriel is a composition where the trumpet performs as one of the main characters, interacting on stage with the vocalists. The three vocal roles represent different aspects of social interaction. "Principal represents society's dependency on the Internet, computers and electronic communication." She lives alone and is consumed by her need to be "connected". There are also two minor male roles that act as Principal's memories. One is the positive spirit of social relationships and the other is the actual situations where social interaction is required.

== Concert premiere ==
.Gabriel was premiered at the Music Workshop, Sydney Conservatorium of Music (July 8, 2010). The two principal roles were performed by Joshua Clarke (Yamaha Performing Artist and Principal Trumpet of the Australian Opera and Ballet Orchestra) and Jane Parkin (Opera Australia Artist and member of the Moffatt Oxenbould Young Artist Program) In March 2010, scenes from the opera sung by Tina Milhorn Stallard, who sang Principal in the premiere recording, had been previewed at the Palm Beach Atlantic University New Music Festival.

== Roles ==
Role	Voice type	Premiere Cast
Gabriel, Principal's unknown companion	Trumpet	Joshua Clarke
Principal, A young woman obsessed with the Internet	Soprano	Jane Parkin
Memory I, A persistent memory trying to resurface in Principal's mind	Tenor	Samuel Sakker
Memory II, A persistent memory trying to resurface in Principal's mind	Bass-baritone	Christopher Hillier

Instrument	Musician
Clarinet	Peter Jenkins
Viola	Virginia Commerfod
Bassoon	Matthew Ockenden
Piano	Tony Legge
Conductor	Tony Legge

== Staged premiere ==
.Gabriel was first staged in America on February 25–26, 2011, by the Boston Metro Opera. The performances took place at Hope Central Church in the historic Boston neighborhood of Jamaica Plain. These performances were announced on December 1, 2009, when the opera won a BMO Mainstage Award.

Character	Voice type	Premiere Cast
Gabriel, Principal's unknown companion	Trumpet	Kathryn Driscoll
Principal, A young woman obsessed with the Internet	Soprano	Sarah Mayo
Memory I, A persistent memory trying to resurface in Principal's mind	Tenor	Christopher Aaron Smith
Memory II, A persistent memory trying to resurface in Principal's mind	Bass-baritone	Stewart Kramer

Instrument	Musician
Piano	Eve K. Budnick

== First recording ==
.Gabriel was recorded by the Palmetto Camerata at the University of South Carolina (January 5–7, 2010) and released by Beauport Classical (BC41009) on CD in 2010. The recording features Tina Milhorn Stallard (soprano) and James Ackley (trumpet) performing the principal roles.

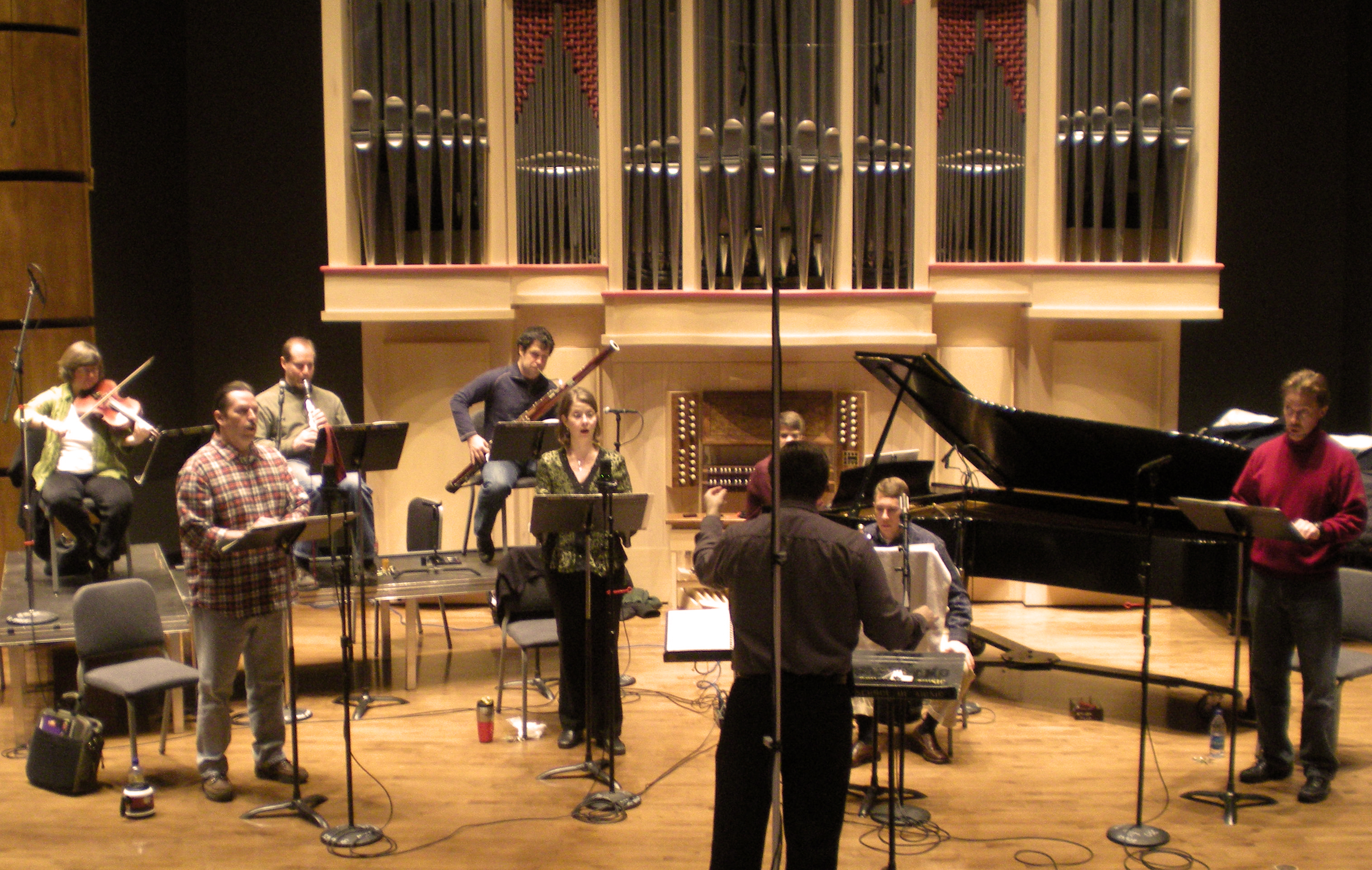
The Palmetto Camerata, .GABRIEL Recording Session, January 5, 2010

Role	Voice type	Recording Cast (Engineer: Jeff Francis)
Gabriel, Principal's unknown companion	Trumpet	James Ackley
Principal, A young woman obsessed with the Internet	Soprano	Tina Milhorn Stallard
Memory I, A persistent memory trying to resurface in Principal's mind	Tenor	Walter Cuttino
Memory II, A persistent memory trying to resurface in Principal's mind	Bass-baritone	Jacob Will

Instrument	Musician
Clarinet	Joseph Eller
Viola	Constance Gee
Bassoon	Michael Harley
Piano	Joseph Rackers
Conductor	Neil Casey

== Sources ==
- Official website
- American Record Guide
- American Music Center Composer Assistance Program 2010 Awards List
- "New opera features trumpet in main role", Opera Australia
- Score: Bradshaw, Robert J. (2009), .Gabriel, Beauport Press, Gloucester, Massachusetts. ISBN 978-0-9822775-1-5
- Sound Recording: Robert J. Bradshaw's .Gabriel. The Palmetto Camerata. Beauport Classical, 2010.
- Young, Neville. ".Gabriel by Robert Bradshaw". ITG Journal of the International Trumpet Guild. October 2010. Vol. 35, No. 1
- International Trumpet Guild Conference Review (Online Reference, Page 5)
- Boston Metro Opera Mainstage Award
- Boston Metro Opera Performance Details and Program
- Riva Richmond (January 28, 2009). "On Networking Sites, Learning How Not to Share". The New York Times. p. B5.
- Joshua Clarke Biography (Yamaha Performing Artist and Principal Trumpet with the Australian Opera and Ballet Orchestra) (archived)
- Jane Parkin Biography (Opera Australia)
- CD Baby (CD Distributor) .Gabriel listing
- International Trumpet Guild Conference 2010
