= Allan Havis =

American playwright

Allan Havis is an American playwright whose dramas have pronounced political themes and probe colliding cultures. His works range from minimal-language texts to ambiguous, ironic narratives that delineate the genesis, paradoxes, and seduction of evil. Several of his stories involve Jewish identity, cultural alienation, and universal problems of racism. He has been influenced by August Strindberg and Harold Pinter.

Havis has written librettos for four operas produced in the early 21st century. He has authored four novels, two young adult novels, and a popular book on cult films. Since 2001, he has edited and published three anthologies of plays, selected to express the changing political landscape in the United States in the era of terrorism. He is a professor of playwriting at the University of California, San Diego.

== Biography ==
Havis has an MFA from Yale Drama School and is on the UC San Diego theatre faculty. For many years he has headed the MFA playwriting program at University of California, San Diego. He served as Provost of Thurgood Marshall College, UC San Diego from 2006 until 2016. He has two children.

== Writing career ==
He has published twenty plays in editions by Broadway Play Publishing Inc., Theatre Communications Group, Penguin/Mentor, Smith & Kraus, Applause Books, University of Illinois, and Southern Illinois University.

His book Cult Films: Taboo and Transgression ( University Press of America, 2008; ISBN 0-7618-3967-4) covers ninety years of cinema. In addition to his plays, Havis wrote the novels: October 7th (Willow River Press, 2026), Architects of the Taj Mahal (Willow River Press, 2024), Maddie Q (Willow River Press, 2023), Clear Blue Silence (Ktav Publishing, 2022), plus two novels for young adults, Albert the Astronomer (Harper & Row, 1979), and its sequel, Albert Down a Wormhole (Goodreads Press, 2019).

He has edited three anthologies of plays: American Political Plays (2001), published by University of Illinois Press; American Political Plays after 9/11 (2010), published by Southern Illinois University Press; and American Political Plays in the Age of Terrorism (2019), published by Bloomsbury/Methuen.

In addition, Havis has written librettos for operas. He adapted his play, Lilith (1990), to use as a libretto for an opera with music by Anthony Davis). The chamber opera highlights the mythical first woman to accompany Adam in the Garden of Eden, who was thought to have had demonic, supernatural power; she is reimagined in a modern era. The world premiere concert recital was at the Conrad Prebys Music Center, UC San Diego on December 4, 2009. Several excerpts of Lilith were given a showcase presentation and new production at the Qualcomm Institute, UC San Diego, in November 2015. This work can be seen on UCSD TV online.

His second opera, also developed with composer Anthony Davis, explored a modern King Lear archetype, with a woman neuroscientist with Alzheimer's disease as the protagonist. Lear on the 2nd Floor had a showcase presentation at Princeton University's Lewis Center for the Arts in March 2012. The opera was produced in March 2013 at Conrad Prebys Music Center, UC San Diego and in November 2022 at Eastman School of Music, Rochester, New York.

His third opera libretto, St. Francis de los Barrios, was given a showcase presentation at the Qualcomm Institute, UC San Diego in December 2017. His fourth opera in collaboration with composer Michael Roth, The Golem of La Jolla had a concert recital at La Jolla Playhouse's 2019 WoW Festival. Pancho Rabbit and the Coyote another Anthony Davis opera collaboration premiered January 2026 in San Diego and Tijuana, produced by Bodhi Tree Concerts in association with Ópera de Tijuana.

== Dramatic works ==
- Pancho Rabbit and the Coyote (opera 2026)
- Hotel Stockholm (2020)
- The Golem of La Jolla (opera 2019)
- St. Francis de los Barrios (opera 2017)
- My Aunt Lucy (2017)
- Zeliha (2016)
- Babette (2015)
- The Hypnotist (2014)
- Garments and Threads (2013)
- The Landlady (2012)
- Arthur and Joe (2012)
- The Black Fox (2012)
- Lear on the 2nd Floor (opera 2012)
- Arrow to the Heart (2010)
- Lilith (opera 2009)
- The Tutor (2008)
- Restless Spirits (2006)
- The Haunting of Jim Crow (2005)
- Three Nights in Prague (2004)
- Private Parties (2003)
- Nuevo California (2003, with Bernardo Solano and Sam Woodhouse)
- Misjudgment of Paris (2002)
- A Jew on Ethiopia Street (2001)
- The Gift (1999)
- Sainte Simone (1996)
- A Vow of Silence (1994)
- Ladies of Fisher Cove (1993)
- A Daring Bride (1990)
- Lilith (1990)
- Hospitality (1988)
- Haut Gout (1987)
- Morocco (1986)
- Mink Sonata (1985)
- Holy Wars (1984)
- Family Rites (1980)
- Interludes (1978)

== Novels ==
- Albert the Astronomer (1979)
- Albert Down a Wormhole (2019)
- Clear Blue Silence (2022)
- Maddie Q (2023)
- Architects of the Taj Mahal (2024)
- October 7th (2026)

== Awards ==
- 2008 San Diego Patté Award for Outstanding New Play, for The Tutor
- 2003, San Diego Theatre Critics Circle Award for New Play, Nuevo California
- 1987, Kennedy Center Award for New Plays, for Morocco
- 1986 HBO's Playwrights USA Award, for Morocco
- 1985 Foundation of the Dramatist Guild/CBS Award, for Morocco
- 1987 Guggenheim Fellowship
- McKnight Fellowship
- Rockefeller Fellowship
- National Endowment for the Arts Fellowship
- California State Arts Fellowship
- New York State Arts Fellowship
