= Hal France =

American conductor

Hal France is an American conductor who was the first Music Director of the Orlando Philharmonic Orchestra from 2000 to 2006, Executive Director of KANEKO from 2008 to 2012, Artistic Director of the Omaha Opera from 1995 to 2005, and Music Director of the Mobile Opera from 1984 to 1990.

He has conducted the New York City Opera, Royal Opera Stockholm, Seattle Opera, Florida Grand Opera, Opera Theatre of Saint Louis, Santa Fe Opera, Glimmerglass Opera, Opera Company of Philadelphia, Lyric Opera of Kansas City, Chautauqua Opera, Minnesota Opera, Cleveland Opera, Calgary Opera, Dayton Opera, Shreveport Opera, Lake George, Opera Carolina, Wolf Trap Opera, Hawaii Opera Theatre, Utah Opera and Symphony, Opera Festival of New Jersey, Tulsa Opera, Portland Opera, Kentucky Opera, Orlando Opera, National Orchestra of Costa Rica, Royal Philharmonic, National Symphony, New Jersey Symphony, Richmond Symphony, Jacksonville Symphony and Omaha Symphony.

He holds degrees from Northwestern University and the University of Cincinnati – College-Conservatory of Music, was a member of the Houston Opera Studio and received a fellowship from the Juilliard Opera Center (1976 – 78) He holds an honorary doctorate from the University of Nebraska at Omaha and an Admiralty in the Nebraska Navy.

He was formerly married to two-time Grammy Award winner Sylvia McNair.
