= Frederic Block =

American judge (born 1934)

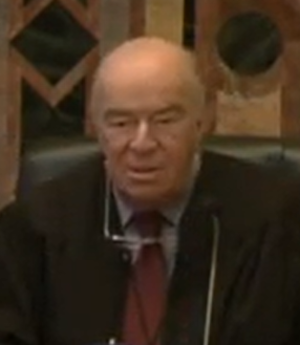
- Block in 2018

Senior Judge of the United States District Court for the Eastern District of New York
- Incumbent
- Assumed office September 1, 2005

Judge of the United States District Court for the Eastern District of New York
- In office September 29, 1994 – September 1, 2005
- Appointed by: Bill Clinton
- Preceded by: Eugene Nickerson
- Succeeded by: Brian Cogan

Personal details
- Born: June 6, 1934 (age 92) Brooklyn, New York City, U.S.
- Education: Indiana University (AB); Cornell University (LLB)

Frederic Block (born June 6, 1934) is a senior United States district judge of the United States District Court for the Eastern District of New York. He was appointed to the federal bench in 1994, and took senior status in 2005.

== Background ==
Born in Brooklyn, New York, on June 6, 1934, Block spent his first years there before his family moved to the Upper West Side of Manhattan. He an Artium Baccalaureus from Indiana University in 1956 and a Bachelor of Laws from Cornell Law School in 1959.

After law school, he was a clerk to the New York Supreme Court, appellate division, from 1959 to 1961. He was in private practice of law in Patchogue from 1961 to 1962, then in Port Jefferson, Centereach, and Smithtown, moving back and forth between these locations from 1962 to 1994. During this time, he became an adjunct professor at Touro Law School, beginning in 1992.

In private practice, Block handled both civil and criminal cases, and trial and appellate work—even arguing a case before the Supreme Court of the United States.

=== Personal life ===
Block married Estelle Kaufman in 1960. Previously a resident of Port Jefferson, New York, on Long Island, Block moved to Manhattan's West Village upon his confirmation as a judge.

== Federal judicial service ==
On July 22, 1994, Block was nominated by President Bill Clinton to a seat on the United States District Court for the Eastern District of New York vacated by Eugene Nickerson. Block was confirmed by the United States Senate on September 28, 1994, and received his commission the next day. He assumed senior status on September 1, 2005, and was succeeded by Judge Brian Cogan.

In 2005, Block complained that the disparity in security between the federal courthouse in Brooklyn, compared to the federal courthouse in Manhattan, was like being a denizen of Fallujah rather than the Green Zone.

=== Notable cases ===
On April 15, 2004, Judge Block sentenced Gambino crime family boss Peter Gotti to 9 years and 4 months in prison for money laundering and racketeering charges. Gotti had a subsequent conviction in the United States District Court for the Southern District of New York for plotting to murder informant and former Gambino underboss Sammy Gravano.

In 2008, Judge Block ruled that the United States government could not use ethnicity as a factor in deciding to detain two Egyptian-born men on a plane. Farag v. United States, 587 F.Supp. 2d 436, 443 (E.D.N.Y 2008). The Judge stated that it was the first case post-September 11 attacks to address whether ethnicity may be used to establish criminal propensity under the Fourth Amendment. Judge Block has stated that this is the matter he is most proud of.

On September 30, 2015, a portion of a "seemingly never-ending dispute" over the printing of the Rebbe's Sichos came to an end when Judge Block dismissed a major part of a lawsuit involving members of the Orthodox Jewish Chabad group. Judge Block dismissed claims of copyright infringement and unfair competition brought by Vaad L'Hafotzas Sichos and Zalman Chanin against Merkos and Agudas Chasidei Chabad.

On May 24, 2016, Judge Block ordered a sentence of one year of probation (rather than the guideline 33-41 month imprisonment) for a defendant who was convicted by a jury of importation and possession of cocaine with the intent to distribute. USA v. Nesbeth (E.D.N.Y. 2016), Text. In a 44-page opinion, Judge Block claimed the "collateral consequences" facing convicted felons are punishment enough. Judge Block's opinion and call for reform appears to be one of the most detailed examinations of collateral consequences and sentencing.

== Other work ==
=== Books ===
==== Nonfiction ====
On July 17, 2012, Judge Block released his first book named Disrobed: An Inside Look at the Life and Work of a Federal Trial Judge. The book was written for a behind the bench look at some of the most controversial cases in the past 20 years. The book covers Judge Block's approach to sentencing such as the death penalty, racketeering, gun laws, drug laws, discrimination laws, race riots, terrorism, and restitution of looted property to victims of the Holocaust.

On May 29, 2019, Judge Block released Crimes and Punishments: Entering the Mind of a Sentencing Judge. The book discusses several criminal cases, Judge Block's personal experiences and personal thoughts as they related to his duties; and demonstrates to the reader the power and responsibilities of a federal judge.

In 2024, Judge Block released another book: A Second Chance: A Federal Judge Decides Who Deserves It. The book again gives examples of real cases, this time to illustrate Block's belief that state judges (in addition to federal judges, who already have this power based on a 2018 federal law, the First Step Act) should have the authority to reduce previously imposed stiff criminal sentences and to grant "compassionate release" to deserving prisoners in extraordinary and compelling circumstances.

==== Fiction ====
In 2017, Block published a novel entitled Race to Judgment.

=== Theatre ===
Block co-wrote a musical called Professionally Speaking with Peter K. Winkler and Ernst Muller, which was produced off-Broadway in 1986. Block's inspiration to write a musical began when he represented a theatrical troupe in a lawsuit in 1981.

== See also ==
- List of Jewish American jurists

Legal offices
Preceded by Eugene Nickerson	Judge of the United States District Court for the Eastern District of New York; 1994–2005	Succeeded by Brian Cogan
