= Wakonda's Dream =

Wakonda's Dream is an English-language opera composed by American Anthony Davis with a libretto by Yusef Komunyakaa. It premiered March 7, 2007 at Omaha, Nebraska's Orpheum. It is about a contemporary Ponca family and the spiritual journey of their son, who is deeply connected to a noted chief, Standing Bear, and an 1879 trial he won in a United States court. The opera was directed by Rhoda Levine.

== Story ==
Wakonda’s Dream is about a contemporary Native American family, affected by the historical events and court case of 1879 in Nebraska, in which American Indians were recognized as “human beings under the law” for the first time in U.S. history. The opera is the story of parents Delores (Ponca) and Justin Labelle, and their son Jason, struggling to find their place as American Indians in contemporary society. Young Jason “sees things, feels things, knows things,” which terrifies his mother. Jason is also constantly for being an Indian by Sonny, an older white boy, and his brother Jimmy.

Proud of her Ponca heritage, Delores keeps the history of their people alive for her son. Jason feels a ghostly connection to the long-dead Chief Standing Bear, whose legacy is revealed in a choral rendering of the famous 1879 trial. As Jason grows from childhood to manhood, Standing Bear remains his spiritual guide. His father Justin dismisses his sense of Indian birthright, leading to tragedy and, ultimately, redemption.

== Development ==
As Anthony Davis was researching American Indian music and history, he attended the annual Ponca pow-wow in the Niobrara region of Nebraska. Among the thousands of attendees, one evening he met a woman and her son who inspired the characters of Delores and Jason.

This woman told Davis that she lived on land where Standing Bear was buried. She said her five-year-old son saw and spoke to the spirit of the Ponca chief. In collaboration with writer Yusef Komunyakaa, the two developed a libretto in which Standing Bear serves as Jason's guide as the boy grows from childhood (in act 1) to adulthood (in act 2). Mainstream society and alcoholism serve as his chief antagonists, although he is harassed by some children when young.

The history of the removal of the Ponca to a reservation in Indian Territory, and the subsequent internment and trial of Standing Bear after he led his people back to their homelands, are revealed through the boy's spiritual communion and through a choral reenactment of the famous trial. Davis says,

"I didn’t want to create a historical narrative or an account of the trial. That could be more easily accomplished in other media like television or film. In opera you have to find a way into the story. In this gifted child we found an artistic prism to look at history and not just present history. Having a character who can envision the past enables you to realize the past in the present. [In Wakonda’s Dream] the past has a concrete effect on everyone in the opera."

The opera's stage director, Rhoda Levine, had suggested Komunyakaa as librettist. She had experience working with him on a project through Northwestern University. The composer and poet immediately agreed to collaborate at an introductory meeting held in the offices of New York City Opera in December 2002. Komunyakaa knew of Anthony Davis’ work before the meeting, and was intrigued by the potential partnership. Of his writing process for this project, Komunyakaa says, "I knew I wanted to stay very close to poetry in writing the libretto." He notes that his work "has always embraced aspects of history as well as the imagination."

He learned much about Native American history when writing a libretto based on events related to the Standing Bear trial. He did not realize that American Indians in the late 1870s were excluded from coverage under the Constitution as equal subjects of the law, that they were prohibited from owning fee simple property if members of tribes, and could not appear in a court of law. Those who belonged to tribes were not considered citizens of the United States, but members of different nations. Rhoda Levine, who also served as creative consultant during the opera development, had previously worked with Davis. She served as both director and dramaturge with Davis on his opera X: The Life and Times of Malcolm X when it premiered at New York City Opera in 1986.

During the development of Wakonda’s Dream, Levine frequently referred to herself as the "audience advocate," a term she prefers to dramaturge. Levine describes the role of history in the opera:

"If one denies one's past, one's future is in some way impaired because your past informs your sense of the future. If you deny your roots, you lose a sense of your own identity. If one feels punished not by what they do but because of who they are – which is how Justin [the father] feels in our story – there is a sense of disconnect. He wants nothing to do with his native past. He feels it has limited his opportunities. But our past will always enrich who we are. That is the theme of Wakonda’s Dream, and it is a universal theme."

== Music ==
He includes known songs, as well as blues, jazz and gospel-inflected music, and underlying Native American rhythms. Davis described the score,

Generally, what I’m doing is a synthesis. I have created something new from many diverse sources. My background draws on the African American tradition, jazz particularly. I developed my own voice as an opera composer that hopefully is not imitative or derivative. My work has a rhythmic quality to it, with rhythmic structure as its foundation. Even in my choral writing, the choir is like a drum."

== Vision for production ==
Levine describes the stage setting as "very simple. The action takes place on a raked surface surrounded by the chorus and a company of American Indian dancers. They are on stage throughout the entire performance, like spirits."

Set designer Peter Harrison says, “The scenic design for Wakonda’s Dream approaches the piece on several levels to reflect the psychological and spiritual realities which co-exist musically and in the libretto. The unmoored world of Justin and his family is a floating raked earthen plain, littered with the detritus of contemporary Native American existence – nature that has been drained of the life and fertility it once held for native people – and filled with the trash of civilization: a broken motorcycle, old tires, crates, abandoned rusty oil drum, etc." He continues, "The plain is also, on another level, the place where past ancestors have seen the Spirit of the earth, danced their shaman dances, and buried their dead to find a peace the modern world begrudges them. When Sonny or Arlington are on stage, I want them to stand out apart from the dancers, while the Labelles seem like they are more at peace while on stage."

== Cast: Originator/vocal parts/roles ==
Order of appearance:

- Eugene Perry/Baritone/Justin Labelle
- Patrick Kilcoyne/Baritone/Sonny Troce
- Kristopher Irmiter/Bass/Arlington
- Joe Fitzgerald/Boy Alto/Jimmy Troce
- Phyllis Pancella/Mezzo-Soprano/Delores Labelle
- Arnold Rawls/Tenor/Chief Standing Bear
- Derek Richardson/Boy Soprano/Bear Shield
- William Ferguson/Tenor/Jason Labelle
- Jonah Davis/Boy Alto/Young Jason Labelle
- Mara Bonde/Soprano/Laura Arlington
- Lily Nunn/Soprano/Young Laura Arlington
- Darin Anderson/Tenor/Joe Carson
