= Evan Mack =

American classical composer

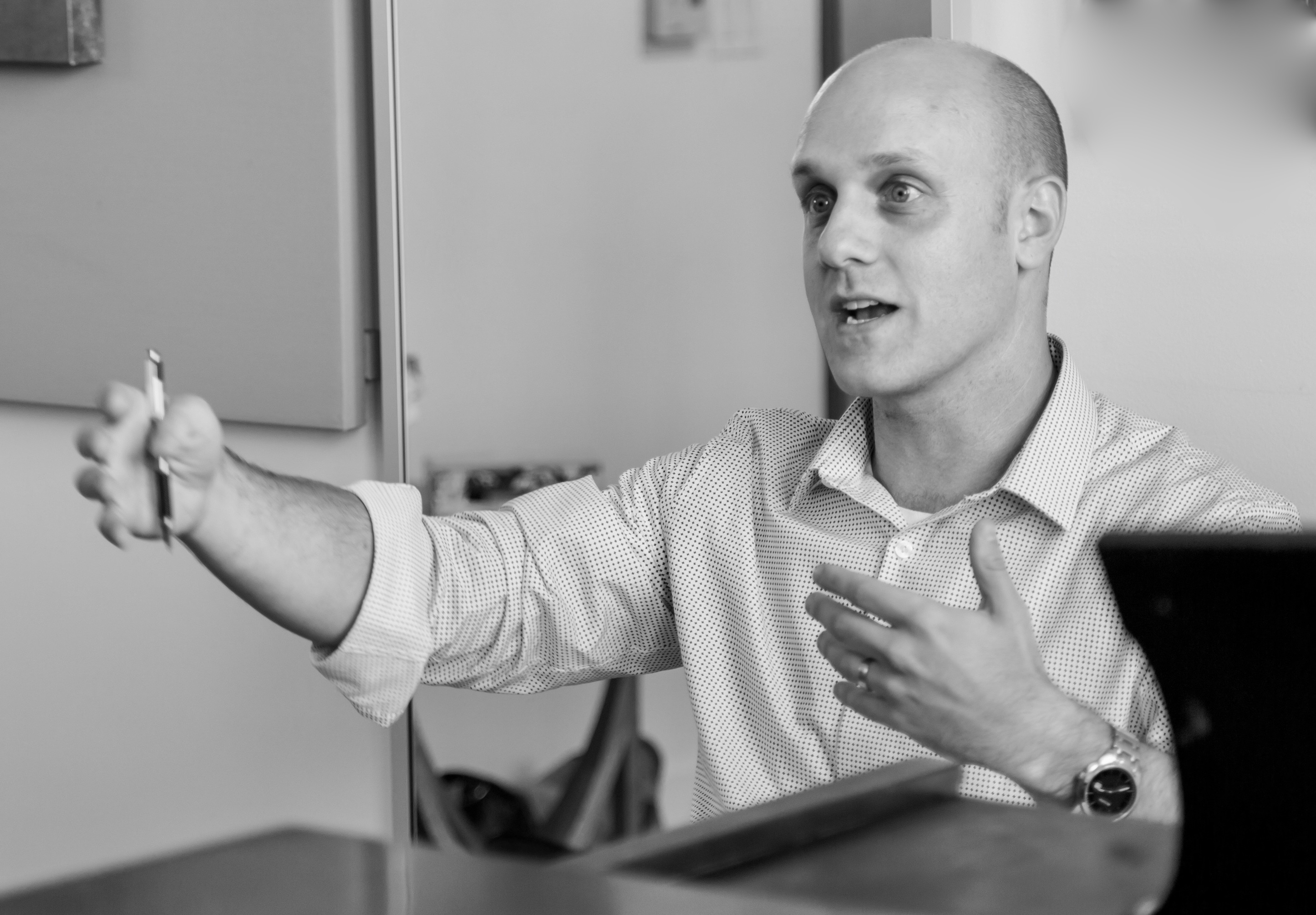
Evan Mack

Evan Mack (born 1981) is an American composer, librettist and pianist on the faculty of Skidmore College. He is "considered one of the most gifted composers of his generation by industry insiders." He is currently published with Hal Leonard, Alfred, and KDP Publishing.

== Studies ==
Mack studied under Craig Nies, Michael Slayton and Stan Link at Vanderbilt University. He later studied with Michael Chertock of the Cincinnati Symphony Orchestra and participated in master classes by George Crumb, Seymour Lipkin, Emanuel Ax and James Tocco.

He holds a Doctorate of Musical Arts in Piano Performance from the University of Cincinnati’s College-Conservatory of Music.

== Compositions ==
Mack composed the music and libretto for his opera Angel of the Amazon, which premiered in May 2011, staged by Encompass New Opera Theatre at the Baryshnikov Arts Center in New York City and was released worldwide by Albany Records. Opera News hailed the work as "edgy...most imaginative...and a worthy contemporary American Opera". He teamed up with librettist, Joshua McGuire. Their first opera titled, The Secret of Luca premiered in Fresno in April 2014. They followed up an American Grand Opera called Roscoe, which premiered by the Seagle Music Colony in 2016. Mack and McGuire's Multi-Cultural Children's Opera, Lucinda y las Flores de la Nochebuena was commissioned by Fresno State Opera Theatre and was seen by thousands of children with performances by San Francisco Opera, Opera in the Heights!, Coker College, and UTRGV. Their one-act opera, The Ghosts of Gatsby was commissioned by Samford University under the direction of Kristin Kenning. This tale of marriage and madness about a day-in-the-life of Zelda Fitzgerald and her husband, F. Scott Fitzgerald won the 2018-2020 National Opera Association's Argento Competition. The Ghosts of Gatsby was performed in its entirety at the 2020 National Conference in Cleveland by Baldwin Wallace under the direction of Scott Skiba. It was performed at Opera Las Vegas in 2021. In March 2019, A Little More Perfect, composed by Evan Mack, was sung by Michael Miller at Glimmerglass Festival. It was based on the Supreme Court's Obergefell v. Hodges decision which legalized same-sex marriage across the United States. In 2023, Dragon's Breath, a opera by Evan Mack and Joshua McGuire, premiered at Samford University. It tells the story of 11-year-old Alan, who learns to manage his anger, personified as a dragon/butterfly, by accepting it as part of himself. Currently, Mack & McGuire and director Christopher Mirto are composing a musical comedy called, The World Still Needs You, Boris Yeltsin! and working on a new opera called A Nearer Mother based on the life of AIDS activist, Ruth Coker Burks.

Mack's choral suite, Langston Hughes’ Dream of Freedom was a Selection Winner of the National Association of Composers, San Francisco and the UCM New Music Festival. The work is published by Hal Leonard. As a composer, he produced five full musicals (three for children's theater). Hailed as “the Springtime Nutcracker,” Mack's Pinocchio was premiered at the Charleston Civic Center by the Charleston Ballet.

Mack's work for two pianos, American Groove, was performed by the Westhuizen Duo across the United States and South Africa throughout 2011. The work was a Selection Winner for the SCI Regional Conference in 2010 and premiered in Greensboro, North Carolina. A choral work, Of Fire and Form, commissioned by the West Virginia chapter of the ACDA premiered in February 2011 at the Clay Center in Charleston, West Virginia and was performed on tour by the Marshall University Chamber Choir.

== Performances ==
Mack's compositions have been performed all over the United States, including Glimmerglass Opera, The Baryshnikov Arts Center, the Seagle Music Colony, Winspear Opera House, Bass Hall, and numerous colleges and universities.

Mack performed as a pianist in the Kentucky Symphony Orchestra, the Cincinnati Symphony Chamber Players, the Dayton Philharmonic Orchestra, and the Cincinnati Symphony Orchestra; including a performance in Carnegie Hall. He performed live for the Dame Myra Hess Concert Series at the Chicago Cultural Center.
