= Anthony Davis (composer) =

American pianist & composer (born 1951)

- Born: February 20, 1951 (age 75); Paterson, New Jersey, U.S.
- Education: Yale University (BA, 1975)
- Occupations: Pianist, composer, professor
- Years active: 1974–present
- Employer: University of California, San Diego
- Organization: Episteme
- Notable work: *X, The Life and Times of Malcolm X* (1986); *Amistad* (1997); *The Central Park Five* (2019)
- Spouse(s): Deborah Atherton (m. ?; d. 2014); Cynthia Aaronson-Davis (m. 1994)
- Children: 2 (including Timothy and Jonah)
- Relatives: Thulani Davis (cousin)
- Awards: Pulitzer Prize for Music (2020)

Anthony Davis (born February 20, 1951) is an American pianist and composer. He incorporates several styles including jazz, rhythm 'n' blues, gospel, non-Western, African, European classical, Indonesian gamelan, and experimental music. He has played with several groups and is also a professor of music at the University of California, San Diego.

Davis is perhaps best known for his operas; he has been called "the dean of African-American opera composers." His better known compositions include X, The Life and Times of Malcolm X, which was premiered by the New York City Opera in 1986; Amistad, which premiered with the Lyric Opera of Chicago in 1997; and Wakonda's Dream, which premiered at Opera Omaha in 2007. His opera The Central Park Five premiered on June 15, 2019, at the Long Beach Opera Company in California. It won him a Pulitzer Prize for Music on May 4, 2020.

== Biography ==
Davis was born in Paterson, New Jersey in 1951. The son of Professor Charles Davis, an expert on author Richard Wright, Davis was brought up in a series of college towns. He has a 1975 degree from Yale University, and has taught at Yale and Harvard University.

Davis is a Distinguished Professor of Music at the University of California, San Diego, having joined the department in 1996. He has received acclaim as a free-jazz pianist, a co-leader or sideman with various ensembles. Such ensembles include those that featured Smith as bandleader from 1974 to 1977. He has played with Anthony Braxton and Leo Smith. In 1981, Davis formed an octet called Episteme. He also wrote the incidental music for the 1993 Broadway version of Tony Kushner's Angels in America.

Many of his operas have explored people and events from African-American history. In a 1986 interview with writer Samuel R. Delany and historian Henry Louis Gates, Jr., Anthony Davis provides a detailed account of his influences and motivations for writing X, The Life and Times of Malcolm X. In 1997 his opera Amistad, with a libretto by his cousin Thulani Davis, premiered at the Chicago Lyric Opera. Its ambition was recognized but the production received mixed reviews. It was accepted for production in 2008 at Spoleto Festival USA. It underwent a major revision and the production was highly praised. Opera Today said that the revised Amistad was "much leaner, more focused and dramatically far more effective than the original. And in so doing they [the Davises] created not only a masterpiece of American opera, but further a work that — against a contemporary horizon darkened by undercurrents of racism — resonates today far beyond Memminger and Spoleto USA."

Davis has also explored Native American history in his work. His opera Wakonda's Dream (2007), with a libretto by Yusef Komunyakaa, is a tale of a contemporary Native American Ponca family in Nebraska and the history that affects them.

His opera, Lilith, (libretto by Allan Havis) had its world premiere at the Conrad Prebys Music Center at UCSD on December 4, 2009. The story is about the demon figure of Jewish mythology who was sometimes said to be biblical Adam's first wife. It is set in a modern era.

He began working on the music for the opera The Central Park Five in 2014. An early version, titled Five, was performed in Newark, New Jersey in 2016 by the Trilogy Company. The librettist for both the early and final versions was playwright Richard Wesley. The Central Park Five premiered on June 15, 2019, in a production by the Long Beach Opera Company in San Pedro, California. In 2020 the work won him the Pulitzer Prize for Music. He is the third UCSD professor in the university's 60-year history to win a Pulitzer. He commented, "it's also very exciting for me that you can create political work that has an impact and speaks to issues in our society. I've done my career creating political works, and I never thought I would ever get a Pulitzer." He learned that he had won the prize while in a Zoom meeting with music faculty colleagues, so they all heard the phone call; one of them later commented "Best Zoombomb ever!"

In 2022, the Detroit Opera staged a production of X, The Life and Times of Malcolm X, directed by Robert O'Hara. This was followed by the Metropolitan Opera's production of the same opera in Fall 2023, which received significant critical acclaim in sources such as The New York Times, San Francisco Classical Voice and Smithsonian Magazine.

In 2023, he composed the opening fanfare "If a Fish Kept His Mouth Shut, He Wouldn't Get Caught!" for the Bandshell's 100th anniversary, commissioned by the Naumburg Orchestral Concerts, and performed in the Naumburg Bandshell, Central Park, in the summer series.

Since 2024 he has been composing an opera based on the children's book Pancho Rabbit and the Coyote by Duncan Tonatiuh.

== Personal life ==
Davis's first wife was the science fiction writer Deborah Atherton (1951-2014), and their son, Timothy (born c. 1980), is a science fiction writer living in New York City.

In 1994, Davis married his second wife, the opera singer Cynthia Aaronson-Davis, and the two had a son named Jonah (born c. 1997), who was a professional baseball player.

== Works ==
=== Orchestral ===
- Wayang V (Piano Concerto, 1984)
- Maps (Violin Concerto, 1988)

(These two works were released on Gramavision 18-8807-1, a 12" long playing record, with Davis as soloist in the piano concerto and dedicatee Shem Guibbory as soloist in the violin concerto. In each, the William McGlaughlin led the Kansas City Symphony Orchestra.)

- You Have the Right to Remain Silent (Clarinet Concerto, 2007)
- Amistad Symphony (2009)

=== Stage ===
- X, The Life and Times of Malcolm X (1986), libretto by Thulani Davis
- Under the Double Moon (1989), libretto by Deborah Atherton
- Tania (1992), with libretto by Michael John LaChiusa, about Patricia Hearst and events following her kidnapping by the Symbionese Liberation Army
- Amistad (1997/revised 2008), with libretto by Thulani Davis, about a case of an 1839 slave mutiny on a Spanish ship that reached the US Supreme Court, which ruled in favor of the Mende, freeing them
- Wakonda's Dream (2007), with libretto by Yusef Komunyakaa, about a contemporary Ponca family in Nebraska, and the spiritual journey of their son
- Lilith (2009), with libretto by Allan Havis, explores a figure from Jewish mythology, sometimes said to be Adam's first wife, set in modern times
- Lear on the 2nd Floor (2012), with libretto by Allan Havis, shifts the story of King Lear to feature a woman neuroscience researcher who has Alzheimer's disease, and her relationships with her three daughters and her late husband Mortimer, the Fool.
- The Central Park Five (2019), with libretto by Richard Wesley. It premiered on June 15, 2019, by the Long Beach Opera Company in California.

== Discography ==
=== As leader/co-leader ===
- 1978: Past Lives (VPA)
- 1978: Of Blues and Dreams (Sackville)
- 1978: Song for the Old World (India Navigation)
- 1979: Hidden Voices (India Navigation) - with James Newton
- 1980: Lady of the Mirrors (India Navigation)
- 1980: Under the Double Moon (MPS) - with Jay Hoggard
- 1981: Epistēmē (Gramavision)
- 1982: I've Known Rivers (Gramavision)
- 1982: Variations in Dream-Time (India Navigation)
- 1983: Hemispheres (Gramavision)
- 1984: Middle Passage (Gramavision)
- 1985: Return from Space (Wonder Nonfiction) (Gramavision)
- 1986: Undine (Gramavision)
- 1988: Ghost Factory (Gramavision)
- 1990: Trio, Vol. 2 (Gramavision)
- 1989: Trio, Vol. 1 (Rhino)
- 1993: Lost Moon Sisters/In Dora Ohrenstein's Urban Diva
- 1992: X: The Life and Times of Malcolm X (Gramavision)
- 2001: Tania (Koch)
- 2008: Amistad (New World)

=== As sideman ===
With Barry Altschul

- Another Time/Another Place (Muse, 1978)
- For Stu (Soul Note, 1979 [1981])

With Ray Anderson

- Blues Bred in the Bone (Enja, 1988)

With Anthony Braxton

- Six Compositions: Quartet (Antilles, 1982)

With Marion Brown

- Vista (Impulse!, 1975)

With Baikida Carroll

- Shadows and Reflections (Soul Note, 1982)

With Chico Freeman

- Kings of Mali

With Jay Hoggard

- Mystic Winds, Tropical Breezes (India Navigation, 1982)

With Leroy Jenkins

- The Legend of Ai Glatson (Black Saint, 1978)
- Space Minds, New Worlds, Survival of America (Tomato, 1979)

With George E. Lewis

- Homage to Charles Parker (Black Saint, 1979)

With Bobby Previte

- Hue and Cry (Enja, 1992)

With David Murray

- Ming (Black Saint, 1980)
- Home (Black Saint, 1982)
- David Murray Quintet (DIW, 1994)

With Wadada Leo Smith

- Reflectativity (Kabell, 1975) also released on Kabell Years: 1971-1979 (Tzadik, 2004)
- Song of Humanity (Kabell, 1977) also released on Kabell Years: 1971–1979 (Tzadik, 2004)
- Reflectativity (Tzadik, 2000)
- Golden Quartet (Tzadik, 2000)
- The Year of the Elephant (Pi, 2002)
- Ten Freedom Summers (Cuneiform, 2012)
- America's National Parks (Cuneiform, 2016)
