= X: The Life and Times of Malcolm X =

1986 opera by Anthony Davis

X: The Life and Times of Malcolm X is an opera with music by Anthony Davis and libretto by Thulani Davis, to a story by Christopher Davis. It is based on the life of the civil rights leader Malcolm X.

== Performance history ==
The opera premiered in a full production at the American Music Theater Festival (AMTF) in Philadelphia on October 9, 1985, and was subsequently revised and expanded for a production at the New York City Opera (NYCO) on September 28, 1986. The latter was listed as the world premiere in accordance with an agreement made between then-NYCO artistic director Beverly Sills, and AMTF directors Eric Salzman and Marjorie Samoff. The Oakland Opera Theater performed the work in June 2006. New York City Opera presented an abridged concert version on May 12, 2010, at the Schomburg Center for Research in Black Culture. A new production directed by Robert O'Hara and starring Davóne Tines premiered at Detroit Opera in 2022; this production was later performed at New York's Metropolitan Opera in November/December 2023 and Seattle Opera in February 2024.

== Roles ==
- Malcolm (baritone)
- Elijah, leader of the Nation of Islam / Street, Malcolm's mentor (high tenor)
- Louise, Malcolm's mother / Betty, Malcolm's wife (soprano)
- Ella, Malcolm's half-sister (mezzo-soprano)
- Reginald, Malcolm's brother (bass-baritone)
- Young Malcolm Little (boy soprano)

== Recordings ==
- Gramavision: Orchestra of St. Luke's, William Henry Curry, conductor (recorded in 1989, issued in 1992)
