= Thulani Davis =

American poet (born 1949)

Thulani Nkabinde Davis
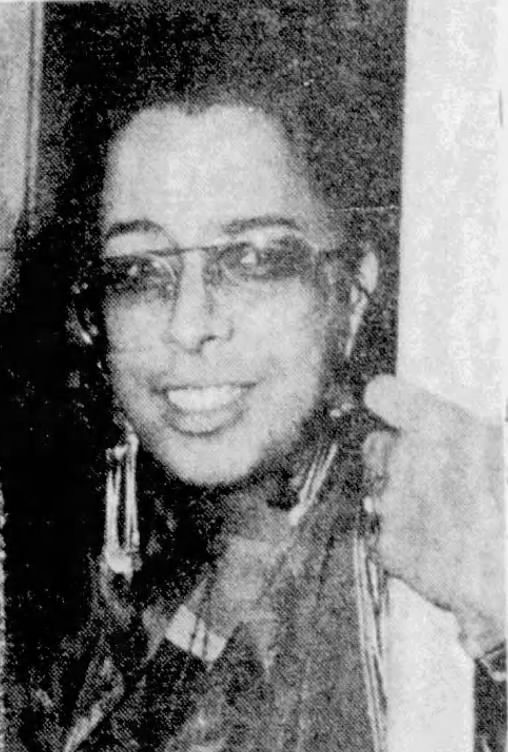
- Davis in 1977
- Born: Barbara Neal Davis; July 19, 1949 (age 77); Hampton, Virginia, United States
- Education: Barnard College; University of Pennsylvania; Columbia University
- Occupations: Playwright; journalist; librettist; novelist; poet; screenwriter
- Writing career
- Language: English
- Notable works: My Confederate Kinfolk; Playing the Changes; All the Renegade Ghosts Rise
- Website: thulanidavis.com

Thulani Davis (born Barbara Neal Davis July 19, 1949) is an American playwright, journalist, librettist, novelist, poet, and screenwriter. She is a graduate of Barnard College and attended graduate school at both the University of Pennsylvania and Columbia University.

In 1992, Davis received a Grammy Award for her album notes on Aretha Franklin's Queen Of Soul – The Atlantic Recordings, becoming the first female recipient of this award. She has collaborated with her cousin, composer Anthony Davis, writing the librettos to two operas.

Davis wrote for the Village Voice for more than a decade, including the obituary for fellow poet and Barnard alumna June Jordan. She was a mentor to a young Greg Tate, before he emerged as an influential journalist and cultural critic. Davis is a contemporary of and collaborator with Ntozake Shange.

== Biography ==
Thulani Davis was born in Hampton, Virginia, on July 19, 1949, to two African-American educators, Willie ("Billie") Louise (née Barbour) Davis and Collis Huntington Davis Sr. The Davises are prominent in Virginia and are the subject of her 2006 book, My Confederate Kinfolk.

Davis graduated from the Putney School in 1966 and continued her education at Barnard College, from which she graduated in 1970. Davis also attended graduate school at the University of Pennsylvania and Columbia University. After graduating from Barnard, Davis moved to San Francisco, where she worked as a reporter for the San Francisco Sun-Reporter, reporting on news stories such as the Soledad Brothers trial and the Angela Davis case.

Davis became a performing poet and worked with a number of musicians and poets in San Francisco. She also joined the Third World Artists Collective, collaborating with Ntozake Shange and others.

In the 1970s, Davis returned to New York City. There, she wrote for the Village Voice for 13 years, eventually working her way up to serve as Senior Editor.

In 1981, she introduced family friend and protégé Greg Tate to The Village Voice music editor Robert Christgau, who asked Tate to contribute to the Voice, where he quickly established himself as one of the influential cultural critics of his generation.

In the mid-1980s, Davis collaborated with her cousin, composer Anthony Davis, on creating their first opera. She wrote the libretto to X, The Life and Times of Malcolm X.

After writing the libretto for Anne LeBaron's 1993 opera The E. and O. Line Davis again collaborated with her brother, writing the libretto to Amistad (1997), first produced by the Chicago Lyric Opera. Tim Page of The Washington Post thought the work had missed some chances. It was based on a case of an apparent slave mutiny on a Spanish ship, which reached the United States Supreme Court. Page wrote,

"the incident is a welcome historical example of the United States behaving with wisdom and compassion toward the helpless and downtrodden. This is grudgingly and elusively acknowledged in the opera, but nowhere near so forcefully stated as it should have been, particularly with all the distasteful examples of white racism that were paraded throughout the evening. To paraphrase Walt Whitman, the abolitionist movement had been simmering, simmering, simmering, until the Amistad Rebellion brought it to a boil."

Amistad received a major revision in libretto and music in 2008 for a new production at the Spoleto USA festival. Opera Today said that it was

"much leaner, more focused and dramatically far more effective than the original. And in so doing they {the Davises] created not only a masterpiece of American opera, but further a work that — against a contemporary horizon darkened by undercurrents of racism — resonates today far beyond Memminger and Spoleto USA."

After her return to New York City, Davis also became involved in the creation of documentaries and dramatic films. Her filmmaker brother, Collis Huntington Davis Jr., introduced her to other Black filmmakers. The first documentary she was associated with aired on PBS. She continues to work on creative projects including operas, films, novels, and plays.

Davis is an ordained Buddhist priest in the Jodo Shinshu sect. She founded the Brooklyn Buddhist Association with her husband Joseph Jarman.

== Works ==
=== Books ===
- The Emancipation Circuit: Black Activism Forging a Culture of Freedom (2022)
- My Confederate Kinfolk (2006)
- Maker of Saints (1996)
- Malcolm X: The Great Photographs (1993)
- 1959, a novel (1992)
- Playing the Changes (1985)
- All the Renegade Ghosts Rise (1978)

=== Plays ===
- The Souls of Black Folk (2003)
- Everybody's Ruby: Story of a Murder in Florida (1999)
- Ava & Cat in Mexico (1994)
- Adaptation of Bertolt Brecht's The Caucasian Chalk Circle (1990)
- Paint (1982)
- Shadow & Veil, with Ntozake Shange, Jessica Hagedorn, Laurie Carlos, et al. (1982)
- Sweet Talk and Stray Desires (1979)
- Where the Mississippi Meets the Amazon, with Shange and Hagedorn (1977)

=== Musical works ===
- Dark Passages (1998)
- Amistad, an opera, libretto (1997/revised 2008)
- A Woman Unadorned (1994)
- Baobab Four (1994)
- The E. and O. Line, an electronic opera, libretto (1993)
- X, The Life and Times of Malcolm X, an opera, libretto (1986)
- X-cerpts (1987)
- Steppin' Other Shores (1983)
- See Tee's New Blues (1982)

== Filmography ==
=== Films ===
- Paid in Full, screenwriter (2002)
- Maker of Saints, co-producer (2010)

=== Documentaries and recordings ===
- I'll Make Me a World: Black Creative Minds in the 20th Century
- W. E. B. Du Bois: A Biography in Four Voices (1996)
- Thulani Davis Asks, 'Why Howard Beach?' (1988)
- Thulani (1984–86)
- Reflections (2002)
- The Musical Railism of Anne LeBaron (1998)
- Songposts, Vol. 1 (1991)
- Without Borders (1989)
- Fanfare for the Warriors (1985)

== Awards and recognition ==
- Inaugural fellow, The Leon Levy Center for Biography, City University of New York Graduate Center, 2008–09
- Fellow, The Newington-Cropsey Foundation Academy of Art, 2007–08
- Fellow, The Charles H. Revson Fellows Program on the Future of the City of New York at Columbia University, 2003–04
- Declared an Admiral of The Great Navy of the State of Nebraska by the Governor of Nebraska, 2004
- The New York Coalition of One Hundred Black Women, First Annual Legacies Award, for Achieving Unparallelled Excellence in the Arts, 2003
- Induction in the Black Writers Hall of Fame, 1998
- The Ralph Metcalfe Chair, Marquette University, Milwaukee, 1998
- The Paul Robeson Cultural Democracy Award, The Chicago Center for Arts Policy, 1998
- David Randolph Distinguished Artist-in-Residence, The New School, NY, 1998
- Massachusetts Institute of Technology, Artist-in-residence, 1996
- Lila Wallace-Reader's Digest Writers Award, 1996–99
- PEW National Theatre Artist Residency Grant, 1993–95
- Grammy Award, Best Album Notes, Aretha Franklin, "The Atlantic Recordings", 1993, First woman to win in category
- Grammy Nomination, Best New Work, Classical, "X, The Life & Times...," 1993
- Chicago Humanities Festival Award, 1992
- New York Foundation for the Arts, The Gregory Millard Fellowship Award, Fiction, 1988
- Manhattan Borough President's Awards, Excellence in the Arts & Literature, 1987
- New York State Council on the Arts, Writer in Residency Award, 1987
- The Fannie Lou Hamer Award, Medgar Evers College, Women's Center, 1987
