= Nels Cline discography =

This is the discography for American jazz musician Nels Cline.

== As leader ==
| Year | Title | Label | Personnel/Notes |
|---|---|---|---|
| 1981 | Elegies | Nine Winds | with Eric von Essen |
| 1988 | Angelica | Enja | |
| 1992 | Silencer | Enja | |
| 1995 | Ground | Krown Pocket | |
| 1996 | Chest | Little Brother | |
| 1997 | Pillow Wand | Little Brother | with Thurston Moore |
| 1997 | In-Store | Father Yod/W.D.T.C.H.C. | with Thurston Moore |
| 1998 | Rise Pumpkin Rise | Volvolo | with Devin Sarno |
| 1998 | Sad | Little Brother | |
| 1999 | Interstellar Space Revisited | Atavistic | with Gregg Bendian |
| 2000 | The Inkling | Cryptogramophone | |
| 2000 | Destroy All Nels Cline | Atavistic | |
| 2002 | Instrumentals | Cryptogramophone | |
| 2004 | Ash and Tabula | Atavistic | with Andrea Parkins & Tom Rainey |
| 2004 | The Entire Time | Nine Winds | with Vinny Golia |
| 2004 | Buried On Bunker Hill | Ground Fault | with Devin Sarno |
| 2004 | Graduation | free103point9 | with Chris Corsano & Carlos Giffoni |
| 2004 | The Giant Pin | Cryptogramophone | |
| 2005 | Banning + Center | Experimental Music Research | with Jeremy Drake |
| 2005 | Immolation & Immersion | Strange Attractors | with Wally Shoup & Chris Corsano |
| 2006 | Four Guitars Live | Important | with Ranaldo, Giffoni, & Moore |
| 2006 | New Monastery | Cryptogramophone | |
| 2007 | Draw Breath | Cryptogramophone | |
| 2007 | Suite: Bittersweet | Strange Attractors | with Wally Shoup & Greg Campbell |
| 2007 | Downpour | Victo | with Andrea Parkins & Tom Rainey |
| 2007 | Duo Milano | Long Song | with Elliott Sharp |
| 2007 | Nothing Makes Any Sense | No Fun | with Giffoni Licht Ranaldo |
| 2009 | Coward | Cryptogramophone | |
| 2009 | Elevating Device | Sounds Are Active | with G.E. Stinson |
| 2010 | Dirty Baby | Cryptogramophone | |
| 2010 | The Celestial Septet | New World | |
| 2010 | Initiate | Cryptogramophone | |
| 2012 | Jazz Free | There | with Henry Kaiser |
| 2012 | Open the Door | Public Eyesore | with Elliott Sharp |
| 2012 | The Gowanus Session | Porter | with Thollem & Parker |
| 2014 | Room | Mack Avenue | with Julian Lage |
| 2014 | Macroscope | Mack Avenue | |
| 2015 | Radical Empathy | Relative Pitch | with Thollem & Wimberly |
| 2016 | Molecular Affinity | Roaratorio | with Thollem & Oliveros |
| 2016 | Lovers | Blue Note | |
| 2018 | Currents, Constellations | Blue Note | |
| 2020 | Gowanus Sessions II | ESP Disk | with Thollem & Parker |
| 2020 | Share the Wealth | Blue Note | |
| 2025 | Consentrik Quartet | Blue Note | with Laubrock, Lightcap & Rainey |

With Acoustic Guitar Trio

| Year | Title | Label |
|---|---|---|
| 2001 | Acoustic Guitar Trio | Incus |
| 2009 | Vignes | Long Song |

With Banyan

| Year | Title | Label |
|---|---|---|
| 1997 | Banyan | CyberOctave |
| 1999 | Anytime at All | CyberOctave |
| 2004 | Live at Perkins' Palace | Sanctuary |

With Quartet Music

| Year | Title | Label |
|---|---|---|
| 1981 | Quartet Music | Nine Winds |
| 1984 | Ocean Park | Nine Winds |
| 1986 | Window On the Lake | Nine Winds |
| 1989 | Summer Night | Delos |

With Wilco

| Year | Title | Label |
|---|---|---|
| 2005 | Kicking Television: Live in Chicago | Nonesuch |
| 2007 | Sky Blue Sky | Nonesuch |
| 2009 | Wilco (The Album) | Nonesuch |
| 2011 | The Whole Love | dBpm |
| 2014 | Alpha Mike Foxtrot | Nonesuch |
| 2015 | Star Wars | dBpm |
| 2016 | Schmilco | dBpm |
| 2019 | Ode to Joy | dBpm |
| 2022 | Cruel Country | dBpm |
| 2023 | Cousin | dBpm |

With other bands

| Year | Artist | Title | Label |
|---|---|---|---|
| 1985 | Rhythm Plague | Dressed for the Apocalypse | Killzone Music |
| 1991 | Bloc | In the Free Zone | A&M |
| 1995 | Geraldine Fibbers | Lost Somewhere Between the Earth and My Home | Virgin/Universal |
| 1996 | A Thousand Other Names | A Thousand Other Names | Birdcage |
| 1997 | Geraldine Fibbers | Butch | Virgin |
| 2005 | Rova::Orkestrova | Electric Ascension | Atavistic |
| 2005 | Solo Career | Season Finale | Box-o-Plenty |
| 2006 | Damsel | Distressed Temporary | Temporary Residence |
| 2009 | West Coast Modern Day Punk Rock Orchestra | Correspondence | Elastic |
| 2010 | Floored by Four | Floored by Four | Chimera Music |
| 2010 | Rova | The Celestial Septet | New World |
| 2011 | bb&c | The Veil | Cryptogramophone |
| 2016 | Rova Channeling Coltrane | Electric Ascension & Cleaning the Mirror | RogueArt |
| 2017 | Big Walnuts Yonder | Big Walnuts Yonder | Sargent House |
| 2019 | Cup | Spinning Creature | Northern Spy |
| 2019 | Exoterm | Exits into a Corridor | Hubro |
| 2019 | Radical Empathy Trio, | Reality and Other Imaginary Places | ESP Disk |
| 2017 | Satoko Fujii Orchestra New York | Fukushima | Libra |
| 2019 | Satoko Fujii Orchestra New York | Entity | Libra |
| 2019 | Stretch Woven | Stretch Woven | Alstro |
| 2025 | Trio of Bloom | Trio of Bloom | Pyroclastic Records |

== As sideman ==
| Year | Main Artist | Title | Label |
|---|---|---|---|
| 1979 | Vinny Golia | Openhearted | Nine Winds |
| 1980 | Tim Berne | 7X | Empire |
| 1984 | Julius Hemphill | Georgia Blue | Minor Music |
| 1986 | John Fumo | After the Fact | Nine Winds |
| 1991 | Dennis Gonzalez | The Earth and the Heart | Konnex |
| 1993 | Firehose | Mr. Machinery Operator | Columbia |
| 1993 | Vinny Golia | Against the Grain | Nine Winds |
| 1994 | Deborah Holland | Freudian Slip | Dog & Pony |
| 1995 | Vinny Golia | Razor | Nine Winds |
| 1995 | Mike Watt | Ball-Hog or Tugboat? | Columbia |
| 1995 | Mike Watt | Big Train | Columbia |
| 1996 | Gregg Bendian | Gregg Bendian's Interzone | Eremite |
| 1996 | Osamu Kitajima | Beyond the Circle | CyberOctave |
| 1996 | Joel Harrison | 3 + 3 = 7 | Nine Winds |
| 1997 | Vinny Golia | Nation of Laws | Nine Winds |
| 1997 | Mike Watt | Contemplating the Engine Room | Columbia |
| 1997 | Wayne Kramer | Citizen Wayne | Epitaph |
| 1998 | Henry Kaiser & Wadada Leo Smith | Yo Miles! | Shanachie |
| 1998 | Mary Lou Lord | Got No Shadow | Work |
| 2000 | Gregg Bendian | Myriad | Atavistic |
| 2001 | Gregg Bendian | Requiem for Jack Kirby | Atavistic |
| 2001 | Alex Cline | The Constant Flame | Cryptogramophone |
| 2001 | Steuart Liebig | Pomegranate | Cryptogramophone |
| 2002 | Jeff Gauthier | Mask | Cryptogramophone |
| 2002 | Mia Doi Todd | The Golden State | Columbia |
| 2003 | Carla Bozulich | Red Headed Stranger | Dicristina Stair Builders |
| 2003 | Rickie Lee Jones | The Evening of My Best Day | V2 |
| 2003 | Noe Venable | The World Is Bound by Secret Knots | Petridish |
| 2003 | John Zorn | Voices in the Wilderness | Tzadik |
| 2003 | Scott Amendola | Cry | Cryptogramophone |
| 2004 | Vinny Golia | One Three Two | Nine Winds |
| 2004 | Blue Man Group | The Complex | Lava |
| 2004 | Carla Bozulich | I'm Gonna Stop Killing | DiCristina Stair Builders |
| 2004 | Lydia Lunch | Smoke in the Shadows | Breakin Beats |
| 2005 | Dean De Benedictis | Salvaging the Past | Spotted Peccary |
| 2005 | Wayne Peet | Live at Al's Bar | pfMENTUM |
| 2005 | Scott Amendola | Believe | Cryptogramophone |
| 2006 | Jeff Gauthier | One and the Same | Cryptogramophone |
| 2006 | The Autumn Defense | The Autumn Defense | Broken Horse |
| 2006 | Ramblin' Jack Elliott | I Stand Alone | Anti- |
| 2006 | Matt Ellis | Tell the People | Krow Pie |
| 2006 | Todd Sickafoose | Blood Orange | Secret Hatch |
| 2006 | Jeff Tweedy | Sunken Treasure | Nonesuch |
| 2007 | Eleni Mandell | Miracle of Five | Zedtone |
| 2007 | Alan Pasqua | The Antisocial Club | Cryptogramophone |
| 2007 | M. Ward | To Go Home | 4AD |
| 2008 | Steven Bernstein | Diaspora Suite | Tzadik |
| 2008 | Huntsville | Eco, Arches & Eras | Rune Grammofon |
| 2008 | Jeff Gauthier | House of Return | Cryptogramophone |
| 2009 | 7 Worlds Collide | The Sun Came Out | Oxfam/Sony |
| 2009 | Bobb Bruno | Dreamt On | Vosotros |
| 2009 | Wadada Leo Smith | Spiritual Dimensions | Cuneiform |
| 2011 | Tinariwen | Tassili | V2 |
| 2011 | Jeff Gauthier | Open Source | Cryptogramophone |
| 2012 | Jherek Bischoff | Composed | Brassland |
| 2012 | Jherek Bischoff | Scores: Composed Instrumentals | Leaf |
| 2012 | Billy Bragg & Wilco | Mermaid Avenue Vol. III | Nonesuch |
| 2012 | Lee Ranaldo | Between the Times and the Tides | Matador |
| 2012 | Martha Wainwright | Come Home to Mama | Cooperative Music |
| 2012 | Rufus Wainwright | Out of the Game | Decca |
| 2013 | Ben Goldberg | Unfold Ordinary Mind | BAG |
| 2013 | Yoko Ono | Take Me to the Land of Hell | Chimera Music |
| 2013 | Retribution Gospel Choir | 3 | Chaperone |
| 2014 | Buffalo Daughter | Konjac-Tion | U/M/A/A |
| 2014 | Bobby Previte | Terminals | Cantaloupe Music |
| 2014 | Jim Keller | Heaven Can Wait | Elisha James/Orange Mountain |
| 2014 | Cibo Matto | Hotel Valentine | Chimera Music |
| 2014 | Medeski Martin & Wood | Woodstock Sessions Vol. 2 | Woodstock Sessions |
| 2015 | Adam Rudolph | Turning Towards the Light | Cuneiform |
| 2015 | Scott Amendola | Fade to Orange | Sazi |
| 2015 | Ben Goldberg | Orphic Machine | BAG |
| 2016 | Ornette Coleman | Celebrate Ornette | Song X |
| 2017 | Jim Campilongo | Live at Rockwood Music Hall NYC | Blue Hen |
| 2017 | Linda Perhacs | I'm A Harmony | Omnivore |
| 2017 | Lee Ranaldo | Electric Trim | Mute |
| 2018 | Harmony Rockets | Lachesis & Clotho & Atropos | Tompkins Square |
| 2018 | Michael Leonhart | The Painted Lady Suite | Sunnyside |
| 2018 | Bobby Previte | Rhapsody | RareNoise |
| 2018 | Chris Lightcap | Superette | Royal Potato Family |
| 2019 | Ben Goldberg | Good Day for Cloud Fishing | Pyroclastic |
| 2019 | Kris Davis | Diatom Ribbons | Pyroclastic |
| 2019 | Michael Leonhart | Suite Extracts Vol.1 | Sunnyside |
| 2019 | Larry Ochs | What Is to Be Done | Clean Feed |
| 2019 | Wayne Peet | What The? | pfMENTUM |
| 2019 | Chris Stamey | New Songs for the 20th Century | Omnivore |
| 2019 | Tedeschi Trucks Band | Beacon Bits 2019 | Nugs.net |
| 2020 | Bobby Previte | Music from the Early 21st Century | RareNoise |
| 2021 | Julius Hemphill | The Boyé Multi-National Crusade for Harmony | New World |
