= Gavin Templeton =

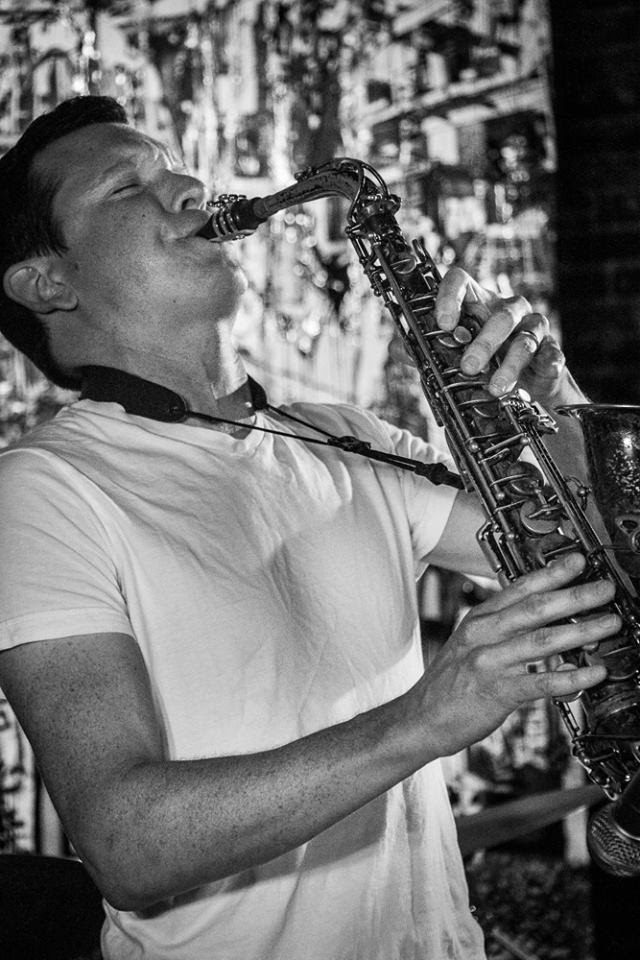

Background information
- Born: Atlanta, GA
- Genres: Jazz
- Occupation: Musician
- Instruments: Saxophone, woodwinds
- Years active: 2008–present
- Labels: Orenda Records; Nine Winds Records
- Website: gavintempletonmusic.com

Gavin Templeton is an American modern jazz saxophonist, composer and bandleader, called "a pivotal force in the L.A. progressive jazz scene."

== Early life and education ==
Templeton was born in Atlanta, Georgia, and raised in Reno, Nevada. He earned his Bachelor of Music in Jazz Studies at the University of Nevada, Reno, and a master's degree from the California Institute of the Arts. He moved to Los Angeles, California, in 2006, where he is a part of the city's progressive jazz scene.

== Career ==
=== Solo and with trio ===
Templeton's debut album, Asterperious Special, was released on Nine Winds Records in 2012, with Templeton on alto saxophone, Larry Koonse on guitar, Gary Fukushima on piano, Darek Oles on bass and Joe LaBarbera on drums. The following year, he released In Series, a modern jazz album featuring jazz-rock arrangements, recorded at Westlake Studios in Los Angeles. It features Templeton as composer and on alto saxophone, Perry Smith on guitar, Sam Minaie on bass, Matt Politano on piano and Matt Mayhall on drums. The album is built thematically around the contrast between material excess and poverty on the west side of Los Angeles.

The Gavin Templeton Trio's Some Spinning, Some At Rest, was released in 2014 on Orenda Records. An album of original compositions by Templeton, it combines composition and improvising, with Templeton on alto saxophone, Richard Giddens on double-bass and Gene Coye on drums. In received 5 out of 5 stars on All About Jazz, and was on the site's Best of 2014 list.

=== Other work ===
Templeton is a member of The Daniel Rosenboom Quintet, playing alto saxophone on the 2014 jazz-metal album Fire Keeper, and on Rosenboom's 2015 Astral Transference as part of the octet. He played woodwinds as part of a 22-piece chamber ensemble on the 2015 album Three Kids Music by Gurrisonic Orchestra, and has also collaborated with guitarist Nels Cline, woodwind player Vinny Golia, big band leader Alan Ferber, Charlie Haden, Wayne Shorter and Joe LaBarbera. Templeton performed as a featured artist at the 2014 Angel City Jazz Festival, and with the Daniel Rosenboom Quintet at the 2014 Monterey Jazz Festival.

== Discography ==
=== Albums ===
Year	Title
2012	Asterperious Special: By: Gavin Templeton; Released: September 18, 2012; Label: Nine Winds Records; Formats: CD, digital download
2013	In Series: By: Gavin Templeton; Released: October 8, 2013; Label: Nine Winds Records; Formats: CD, digital download
2014	Some Spinning, Some At Rest: By: Gavin Templeton Trio; Released: August 1, 2014; Label: Orenda Records; Formats: CD, digital download

=== Appears on ===
Year	Album	Artist	Credits
2008	Visions and Nightmares	Dr. Mint	Alto saxophone
2008	Live 2008	Plotz!	Alto saxophone
2009	Vinny Golia’s Friday Nite Band	Vinny Golia	Alto saxophone
2009	A New Symphony	Dr. Mint	Alto saxophone
2009	Book of Riddles	Daniel Rosenboom	Saxophones
2009	How Much Better if Plymouth Rock Had Landed on the Pilgrims	David Rosenboom	Alto saxophone
2009	The Kid	Plotz!	Saxophones
2010	Abstract Realism	Peter Epstein & Idée Fixe	Saxophones
2010	Dirty Baby	Nels Cline	Alto saxophone
2011	Abstractions and Retrocasualties	The Vinny Golia Sextet	Alto saxophone
2011	Low and Inside	The Vinny Golia Octet	Alto saxophone
2011	Fallen Angeles	Daniel Rosenboom	Alto saxophone
2013	Ritual	Dr. Mint	Woodwinds
2013	Shades of Truth	Trevor Anderies	Alto saxophone
2013	Unsayable Absence: Live at the Blue Whale	Daniel Rosenboom	Woodwinds
2013	Ritual	David Dominique	Alto saxophone, baritone saxophone, flute
2014	Fire Keeper	The Daniel Rosenboom Quintet	Saxophones, bass clarinet
2014	Farewell	Jon Armstrong Jazz Orchestra	Woodwinds
2015	Prisms, Cycles, Leaps	Derrick Spiva Jr. & Bridge to Everywhere	Woodwinds
2015	Kingsize Sessions	Dr. Mint	Woodwinds
2015	Astral Transference	Daniel Rosenboom	Alto saxophone
2015	Three Kids Music	Gurrisonic Orchestra	Woodwinds
2015	Jazziz on Disc, Vol. 5	(Jazziz magazine compilation)	Alto saxophone
2016	Lovers	Nels Cline	Clarinet, Alto saxophone
2018	Thelonious Sphere Monk	Mast (Tim Conley)	Saxophone
