= For People in Sorrow =

Live album by Alex Cline
- Released: March 19, 2013
- Recorded: October 2, 2011; Walt Disney Concert Hall, Los Angeles, CA
- Genre: Jazz
- Length: 67:42
- Label: Cryptogramophone; CG146
- Producer: Alex Cline

Alex Cline chronology
Continuation (2009)	For People in Sorrow (2013)

For People in Sorrow is an album by American percussionist Alex Cline performing a composition inspired by the Art Ensemble of Chicago's 1969 album People in Sorrow which was recorded live at the Angel City Jazz Festival in 2011 and released on the Cryptogramophone label.

== Reception ==
Professional ratings
Review scores
Source	Rating
Allmusic	4.5/5 stars

The Allmusic review by Thom Jurek awarded the album 4½ stars out of 5, stating "For People in Sorrow is not only a fitting tribute to Mitchell, the work, the AEC, and AACM, but proves a new high-water mark for Cline in terms of discipline, openness, and vision". Writing for JazzTimes, Mike Shanley stated "This rendition makes for an intense listen that stands as both a singular statement and a salute to the composer".

== Track listing ==
Disc One: CD

1. "A Wild Thing" - 3:55
2. "People in Sorrow" - 63:47

Disc Two: DVD

1. For People in Sorrow - 70:18

== Personnel ==
- Alex Cline - drums, percussion
- Dan Clucas - cornet, flute
- Oliver Lake - saxophone, flute
- Vinny Golia - woodwinds
- Jeff Gauthier - electric violin
- Maggie Parkins - cello
- G.E. Stinson - electric guitar, electronics
- Zeena Parkins - harp
- Myra Melford - piano, harmonium
- Sister Dang Nghiem - chant, bell
- Mark Dresser - bass
- Will Salmon - conductor
- Larry Ward - recitation
- Dwight Trible - voice
