= The Lamp and the Star =

Studio album by Alex Cline
- Released: 1989
- Recorded: September 1987
- Studio: Mad Hatter Studio; Los Angeles, CA
- Genre: Jazz
- Length: 49:51
- Label: ECM; ECM 1372
- Producer: Alex Cline, Nels Cline

Alex Cline chronology
Not Alone (1981)	The Lamp and the Star (1989)	Montsalvat (1992)

The Lamp and the Star is an album by American jazz percussionist and drummer Alex Cline recorded in September 1987 and released on ECM in November 1989. The octet consists singers Nels Cline and Aina Kemanis, didgeridoo player Susan Rawcliffe, string section Jeff Gauthier and Hank Roberts, and rhythm section Wayne Peet, Eric Von Essen and Alex Cline himself.

== Reception ==
Professional ratings
Review scores
Source	Rating
AllMusic	3/5 stars

The AllMusic review states "Percussionist Alex Cline's first album as a composer demonstrates, right out of the gate, the man's knack for conjuring timeless, elemental music. Minimal ambience opens most tracks, with Cline's love of Asian percussion evident via gongs and Tibetan singing bowls."

== Track listing ==
All compositions by Alex Cline.

1. "A Blue Robe in the Distance" – 16:07
2. "Eminence" – 6:26
3. "Emerald Light" – 7:26
4. "Altar Stone" – 13:00
5. "Accepting the Chalice" – 7:05

== Personnel ==
- Aina Kemanis – voice
- Jeff Gauthier – violin, viola, voice
- Hank Roberts – cello, voice
- Wayne Peet – piano, organ
- Eric Von Essen – bass
- Alex Cline – percussion, voice
- Nels Cline – voice
- Susan Rawcliffe – didgeridoo

=== Technical personnel ===
- Alex Cline, Nels Cline – producer
- Jan Erik Kongshaug – mixed by
- Geoff Sykes – engineer
- Ira Rubnitz – assistant engineer
- Dani Lienhard – design
- Jean Guy Lathulière – cover photograph
- Roch Doran – photography
