= Chest (album) =

Studio album by Nels Cline Trio
- Released: June 1996
- Recorded: June 1993 – August 1995
- Genre: Free jazz, jazz-rock
- Length: 71:48
- Label: Little Brother
- Producer: Jeff Gauthier, Alex Cline, Nels Cline, Mike Hogan

Nels Cline Trio chronology
Ground (1995)	Chest (1996)	Sad (1998)

Chest is an album by the American band Nels Cline Trio. It was the first release on Little Brother Records.

The album was recorded in June 1993 at Sage & Sound by Geoff Sykes (except "Beardism/Call Crouch" and "Power Ballad for Woodward A." which were recorded July 11, 1995, at New Zone Studio by Wayne Peet); however it was released only in 1996, as Nels Cline thought it too extreme for his label at the time, Enja. The artwork is by Carole Kim.

== Critical reception ==
The Rocket praised Cline's "frenzied bliss and noisy prowess."

== Track listing ==
1. "Intro: Chant for the Road"
2. "Beardism / Call Crouch"
3. "Coastal Scrub"
4. "Power Ballad for Woodward A."
5. "The Rite (for Ingrid Thulin)"
6. "Bath"
7. "Sister Hotel"
  - "Room"
  - "Ties"
  - "Curtains"
  - "Down Elevator"
8. "Hands of the Puppeteer" (bonus track on double vinyl)
9. "Min Tao (for Paul Motian)"
10. "The Gamine"

== Personnel ==
- Nels Cline – Guitars
- Bob Mair – Bass Guitars
- Michael Preussner – Drum Set
