= The Choir Boys with Strings =

Studio album by Jeff Kaiser and Andrew Pask with Steuart Liebig and G.E. Stinson
- Released: 2006
- Recorded: October 5, 2005
- Venue: Ventura College Theater, Ventura, California
- Genre: Folk rock; avant-garde; experimental
- Length: 79:46
- Label: pfMENTUM
- Producer: Jeff Kaiser

The Choir Boys with Strings is a studio album by Jeff Kaiser and Andrew Pask with Steuart Liebig and G.E. Stinson, released in 2006 on pfMENTUM (PFMCD037).

== Track listing ==
Track listing for The Choir Boys with Strings
No.	Title	Length
1.	"Needlework Alice"	11:59
2.	"Impromptu Lateral Drop"	7:26
3.	"Tobacconist From Rimini"	10:59
4.	"Frenchwoman Luggage Cart"	8:39
5.	"Adulterous Dishwasher"	9:40
6.	"Definitely Jack"	10:23
7.	"Rest Of The Skeleton"	15:12
8.	"Wir Sind Hier"	5:28

== Personnel ==
- Clarinet, saxophone, electronics – Andrew Pask
- Guitar, electronics – G.E. Stinson, Steuart Liebig
- Recorded by Wayne Peet
- Trumpet, flugelhorn, electronics, mixed by, mastered by, artwork by – Jeff Kaiser
