= Wayne Peet =

American jazz musician

Wayne Edward Peet (born December 6, 1954, in Dallas) is an American jazz pianist and organist, active chiefly on the West Coast jazz scene.

Peet began on piano at age six; he played in churches in Washington, Oregon, Idaho, and California while young. He also played trombone but quit the instrument in his early 20s. He attended Westmont College from 1973 to 1977, where he was a founding member with John Rapson of the Frobisher Hall Art Ensemble.

Peet moved to Los Angeles in 1978 to play with John Rapson. He played with Alex Cline, Nels Cline, Vinny Golia, and Steuart Liebig in the 1980s, and recorded for Golia's Nine Winds label. Peet has composed extensively for film and television, and also does production and engineering for Nine Winds, pfMentum, Blue Note, Enja, Atavistic, Little Brother, SST and other labels. He wrote arrangements for Brian Setzer from 1992 to 1994, played with Bobby Bradford in 2000 and engineered the first Leviathan Brothers EP in 2005.

== Discography ==
=== As leader ===
- Down-In/Ness (Nine Winds, 1981)
- No Reverse with Vinny Golia (Nine Winds, 1984)
- Blasto! (Nine Winds, 1987)
- Fully Engulfed (Nine Winds, 1994)
- Live at Al's Bar (pfMentum, 2003)
- Dreams from My Real Father (Highway 61 Entertainment, 2012)

=== As sideman ===
With Alex Cline

- The Lamp and the Star (ECM, 1989)

With Nels Cline

- Destroy All Nels Cline (Atavistic, 2001)
- Dirty Baby (Cryptogramophone, 2010)
