= Transformation (Don Preston album) =

Studio album by Don Preston Trio
- Released: March 13, 2001
- Recorded: June 10, 2000
- Genre: Jazz
- Length: 68:45
- Label: Cryptogramophone; CG107
- Producer: Jeff Gauthier

Don Preston Trio chronology
Music from Blood Diner & Other Films (2000)	Transformation (2001)	Transcendence (2002)

Transformation is an album by American keyboardist Don Preston which was released in March 2001 on the Cryptogramophone label.

== Reception ==
Professional ratings
Review scores
Source	Rating
Allmusic	4.5/5 stars

The Allmusic review by Rick Anderson awarded the album 4½ stars out of 5, stating "as outside as he gets, he never fully departs from a jazz feel -- that's partly due to the texture of the piano trio, and partly due, one suspects, to the fact that that's where his heart truly is. This is not, for the most part, easily accessible music, but it will richly reward anyone who makes an effort to approach it". JazzTimes' Bill Shoemaker noted "the opportunity to hear him ruminate in a trio setting on Transformation, revisiting choice moments of past weirdness and glory, as well as dig into original works and unlikely standards, is not to be missed".

== Track listing ==
All compositions by Don Preston except as indicated

1. "The Eric Dolphy Memorial Barbeque" (Frank Zappa) - 6:08
2. "Walking Batteriewoman" (Carla Bley) - 7:39
3. "Inner Blues" - 7:05
4. "I Love You" (Cole Porter) - 10:50
5. "The Lind Sonata"- 10:16
6. "Ode to the Flower Maiden" (John Carter) - 7:51
7. "The Donkey" (Bley) - 4:17
8. "Transformation" (Carter) - 6:00
9. "The Prehistoric Eons" - 8:34

== Personnel ==
- Don Preston – piano, voice
- Joel Hamilton - bass
- Alex Cline - drums
