= Angelica (album) =

Studio album by Nels Cline
- Released: 1988
- Recorded: August 7–8, 1987
- Genre: Jazz
- Length: 50:40
- Label: Enja
- Producer: Vinny Golia

Nels Cline chronology
Angelica (1988)	Silencer (1992)

Angelica is an album by American guitarist Nels Cline which was released in 1988 by Enja Records.

== Track listing ==
1. Angel Of Death - 8:12
2. Maria Alone (For Maria Farandouri) - 8:17
3. The Lung (For Vinny Golia) - 8:44
4. Bandoneon (For Dino Saluzzi) - 6:03
5. Fives & Sixes (For Booker Little) - 10:54
6. Jara (For Victor Jara) - 8:30

== Personnel ==
- Nels Cline – acoustic and electric guitars
- Stacy Rowles – trumpet, flugelhorn
- Tim Berne – alto saxophone
- Eric Von Essen – bass, harmonica
- Alex Cline – drums, percussion
- Vinny Golia – producer
