= The Boyé Multi-National Crusade for Harmony =

Live album by Julius Hemphill
- Released: 2021
- Recorded: 1977–2007
- Venue: Various
- Genre: Free jazz
- Length: 7:58:54
- Label: New World; 80825
- Producer: Marty Ehrlich

Julius Hemphill chronology
Live at Kassiopeia (2011)	The Boyé Multi-National Crusade for Harmony (2021)

The Boyé Multi-National Crusade for Harmony is a seven-disc box set album of music by saxophonist and composer Julius Hemphill. Drawn from previously unissued recordings found in the Julius Hemphill Archive at the Fales Library of New York University, and compiled by Marty Ehrlich, the album presents Hemphill in a variety of mostly live solo and group contexts recorded over a period of thirty years, beginning in 1977, and also includes a disc on which he conducts his compositions. The album was released on CD by New World Records in 2021, and each of the discs is also available as a digital download.

== Reception ==
Professional ratings
Review scores
Source	Rating
All About Jazz	4/5 stars

Mark Corroto of All About Jazz called the album an "important document," and wrote: "The music leaves you convinced... that Julius Hemphill deserves his place among the greatest musical minds of the 20th century."

DownBeat's Peter Margasak stated that the album "goes a long way in filling out the complex story of this multifaceted artist whose breadth and vision were seriously short-changed by the recording industry," and praised the "astonishing small-group work" heard on many of the tracks.

Writer Richard Williams described the album as "an extraordinarily rich piece of musical archaeology which covers many aspects of Hemphill's art at satisfying length," and commented: "Throughout the listener is struck by how effectively Hemphill was able to blend free blowing with structured composition. Some of his themes have the intensity of bebop leavened with the humour of Monk, but with a down-home flavour that was Hemphill's own. Whether on alto or soprano, he was a stunningly fluent improviser who took off from a space between Charlie Parker and Ornette Coleman and headed out into his own territory."

In a review for NPR Music, Kevin Whitehead stated that the album is "sprawling, a little uneven and with variable sound quality," and therefore not "an ideal introduction to Julius Hemphill's music." However, he suggested that because "Hemphill was one of the key jazz composers of the late 20th century," "his music should be part of any informed listener's jazz education."

Seymour Wright of The Wire noted that the album "offers a fresh view and... insight into [Hemphill's] oeuvre," and remarked: "Hemphill's music sounds fantastic. Beautiful, often see-sawing, compositions draw together, and stack and balance, long meaningful lines that can flip from horizontal to vertical, from flat out to a full stop, and back. Solid, and often slow, rhythms work up and build open, multilayered spaces for solo dialogue and exchange. And crucially, the groups Hemphill assembled to play his music involve utterly distinct, and now definitive, instrumental voices."

Writing for Point of Departure, Bill Shoemaker commented: "Throughout his life and for years after, there was the sense that we had only seen the tip of the iceberg, that there was so much more to Hemphill's music that went unheard. This revealing, richly rewarding collection confirms this... Hemphill was singular, as The Boyé Multi-National Crusade for Harmony makes plain. The rub remains that he had so much more music to make than his time allowed. Yet, the half glass Hemphill left is to be cherished, especially now, 25 years after his passing."

The Free Jazz Collective's Gary Chapin stated that the album "fills a real need," and wrote: "Like other greats of this music, Hemphill's genius included finding partners who could see the connection between interpretation and great improvisational voice. Both Bakida (sic) Carroll and Olu Dara, just for two examples are essential voices in Hemphill's work. No one else could add to the pieces in the way that they did."

In an article for Dusted Magazine, Michael Rosenstein remarked: "Hemphill's discography was never extensive, and most of what he put out is now out of print. Which makes this expansive boxed set... invaluable... Any of these discs, taken separately, would be a welcome addition to Hemphill's discography. Taken together, they provide a wide-ranging, illuminating view even to those who've long immersed themselves in his music."

Seth Colter Walls of The New York Times noted that the album "showcases Julius Hemphill's work as a composer, saxophonist and flutist on the boundary between jazz and classical styles," and stated that the variety of music "show[s] how thoroughly he adapted and reinvigorated" his early influences.

== Disc 1 - The Boyé Multi-National Crusade for Harmony I ==
Track listing

1. "Dear Friend" – 17:37
2. "Zuli" – 18:21
3. "Band Introduction" – 0:44
4. "At Harmony" – 12:31
5. "Air Rings" – 12:32
6. "Dimples: Fat Lady on Parade" – 12:34
- Tracks 1–4 were recorded in Toulouse, France, on December 6, 1980. Track 5 was recorded at DC Space in Washington, DC, on November 23, 1979. Track 6 was recorded at Century City Playhouse in Los Angeles on May 29, 1978.

Personnel
Tracks 1–4 - The Julius Hemphill Quartet

- Julius Hemphill – alto saxophone, tenor saxophone
- Olu Dara – trumpet
- Abdul Wadud – cello
- Warren Smith – drums

Track 5 - The Boyé Multi-National Crusade For Harmony

- Julius Hemphill – soprano saxophone
- Baikida Carroll – trumpet
- Jehri Riley – guitar
- Phillip Wilson – drums

Track 6 - The Julius Hemphill Quintet

- Julius Hemphill – soprano saxophone
- John Carter – clarinet
- Baikida Carroll – trumpet
- Roberto Miranda – double bass
- Alex Cline – drums

== Disc 2 - The Julius Hemphill/Abdul Wadud Duo ==
Track listing

1. "Syntax" – 9:16
2. "Tightenin'" – 10:02
3. "Slang" – 10:05
4. "Unknown Title" – 10:24
5. "Rhapsody" – 10:42
6. "Downstairs" – 10:23
- Unknown recording location and date.

Personnel

- Julius Hemphill – alto saxophone, soprano saxophone
- Abdul Wadud – cello

== Disc 3 - The Janus Company ==
Track listing

1. "Opener" – 6:05
2. "#4" – 10:28
3. "#3—Improvisation—#2" – 19:23
4. "Collective Improvisation" – 26:10
5. "Dogon A.D." – 11:42
- Tracks 1 and 2 were recorded at Studio 28 in New York City on December 10, 1977. Track 3 was recorded at Mapenzi in Berkeley, California, during 1977. Tracks 4 and 5 were recorded at the Foxhole in Philadelphia during 1977.

Personnel
Tracks 1–3 - The Janus Company

- Julius Hemphill – alto saxophone, soprano saxophone
- Baikida Carroll – trumpet
- Alex Cline – drums

Tracks 4 and 5 - The Janus Company + Abdul Wadud

- Julius Hemphill – alto saxophone, soprano saxophone
- Baikida Carroll – trumpet
- Abdul Wadud – cello
- Alex Cline – drums

== Disc 4 - Chamber Music ==
Track listing

1. "Parchment" (1988) – 7:02
2. "Mingus Gold: Nostalgia In Times Square" (1988) – 4:29
3. "Mingus Gold: Alice's Wonderland" (1988) – 7:35
4. "Mingus Gold: Better Get It In Your Soul" (1988) – 7:11
5. "Unknown Title No. 1" (1981) – 27:13
6. "Unknown Title No. 2" (1981) – 10:03
- Tracks 1–4 were recorded at the Isabella Stewart Gardner Museum in Boston on August 2, 2007. Tracks 5 and 6 were recorded at Soundscape in New York City on December 5, 1981.

Personnel
Track 1 - solo piano

- Ursula Oppens

Tracks 2–4 - string quartet

- Daedalus String Quartet

Tracks 5–6 - chamber ensemble

- Julius Hemphill – conductor
- Marty Ehrlich – soprano saxophone, alto saxophone, clarinet, bass clarinet
- John Purcell – oboe, tenor saxophone, bass clarinet
- Janet Grice – bassoon
- Bruce Purse – trumpet
- Ray Anderson – trombone, tuba

== Disc 5 - Roi Boyé Solo and Text ==
Track listing

1. "Trills" – 5:03
2. "Unfiltered Dreams: Wade In The Water" – 3:48
3. "Unfiltered Dreams: Change My Clothes" – 4:50
4. "Unfiltered Dreams: Nobody Tells Me What to Do" – 5:55
5. "Unfiltered Dreams: Rapture is the Rupture We are Looking For" – 5:07
6. "Unfiltered Dreams: Compute the Dolphin" – 5:01
7. "Unfiltered Dreams: In Periods of Trance" – 2:31
8. "Unfiltered Dreams: Why I Left St. Louis Soliloquy" – 8:30
9. "Unfiltered Dreams: Power Dancer" – 5:27
10. "Soweto 1976: A Suite in Five Voices: Part I: The Orator" – 3:41
11. "Soweto 1976: A Suite in Five Voices: Part II: What are They Waiting For Me to Tell Them?" – 2:48
12. "Soweto 1976: A Suite in Five Voices: Part III: The Hipster" – 4:05
13. "Soweto 1976: A Suite in Five Voices: Part IV: The Preacher" – 7:54
14. "Soweto 1976: A Suite in Five Voices: Part V: Carnival Barker" – 2:51
15. "Solo Soprano Saxophone With 'Bells' Recording" – 7:31
- Track 1 was recorded at the Lenox Arts Center in Lenox, Massachusetts, on September 1, 1981. Tracks 2–9 were recorded at the Public Theater in New York City during 1982. Tracks 10–14 were recorded at an unknown location and date. Track 15 was recorded at the Verona Jazz Festival on June 6, 1980.

Personnel

- Julius Hemphill – alto saxophone, soprano saxophone, flute
- K. Curtis Lyle – voice (poetry) (tracks 2–9)
- Malinké Elliott – voice (recitation) (tracks 10–14)

== Disc 6 - The Boyé Multi-National Crusade for Harmony II ==
Track listing

1. "K.C. Line" – 8:33
2. "Testament #5" – 8:30
3. "Song Suite: At Harmony" – 0:50
4. "Song Suite: Sixty/Sixty" – 1:22
5. "Song Suite: Astrid" – 2:07
6. "Song Suite: Mailika" – 3:08
7. "Song Suite: Pull It" – 1:41
8. "Song Suite: Rites" – 0:46
9. "Pigskin" – 15:18
10. "For Billie (For Billie Holiday)" – 13:10
11. "One / Waltz / Time" – 9:39
- Tracks 1 and 2 were recorded at the Manhattan Healing Arts Center in New York City on December 18, 1983. Tracks 3–8 were recorded at an unknown location and date. Tracks 9 and 10 were recorded at Lush Life in New York City on October 5, 1982. Track 11 was recorded on an unknown location during a 1986 European tour.

Personnel
Tracks 1 and 2 - The Julius Hemphill Trio

- Julius Hemphill – alto saxophone
- Abdul Wadud – cello
- Michael Carvin – drums

Tracks 3–8 - Duo

- Julius Hemphill – alto saxophone, soprano saxophone, flute
- Jerome Harris – electric bass

Tracks 9 and 10 - The Julius Hemphill Quartet

- Julius Hemphill – alto saxophone
- Jack Wilkins – guitar
- Jerome Harris – electric bass
- Michael Carvin – drums

Track 11 - The JAH Band

- Julius Hemphill – alto saxophone
- Allan Jaffe – guitar
- Nels Cline – guitar
- Steuart Liebig – electric bass
- Alex Cline – drums

== Disc 7 - Live at Joyous Lake ==
Track listing

1. "Mirrors" – 27:16
2. "Dung" – 24:07
3. "Band Introduction" – 0:46
4. "Would Boogie" – 14:36
- Recorded at Joyous Lake in Woodstock, New York, on December 19, 1979.

Personnel

- Julius Hemphill – alto saxophone
- Baikida Carroll – trumpet
- Dave Holland – double bass
- Jack DeJohnette – drums
