= The Nels Cline Singers =

- Origin: Los Angeles, California, U.S.
- Genres: Free jazz, jazz-rock, avant-garde, experimental
- Years active: 2001–present
- Labels: Cryptogramophone, Mack Avenue
- Members: Nels Cline; Scott Amendola; Trevor Dunn; Cyro Baptista; Skerik; Brian Marsella
- Past members: Devra Hoff
- Website: www.nelscline.com

The Nels Cline Singers are an American free jazz group led by Nels Cline, following his work in the Nels Cline Trio. They have released five albums on Cryptogramophone Records. Despite the name, there are no singers in the group.

== Studio albums ==
- Instrumentals (Cryptogamophone, 2002)
- The Giant Pin (Cryptogramophone, 2004)
- Draw Breath (Cryptogramophone, 2007)
- The Celestial Septet (New World, 2008 [2010]) - with Rova Saxophone Quartet
- Initiate (Cryptogramaphone, 2010)
- Macroscope (Mack Avenue, 2014)
- Share the Wealth (Blue Note, 2020)
