= Ross Hammond =

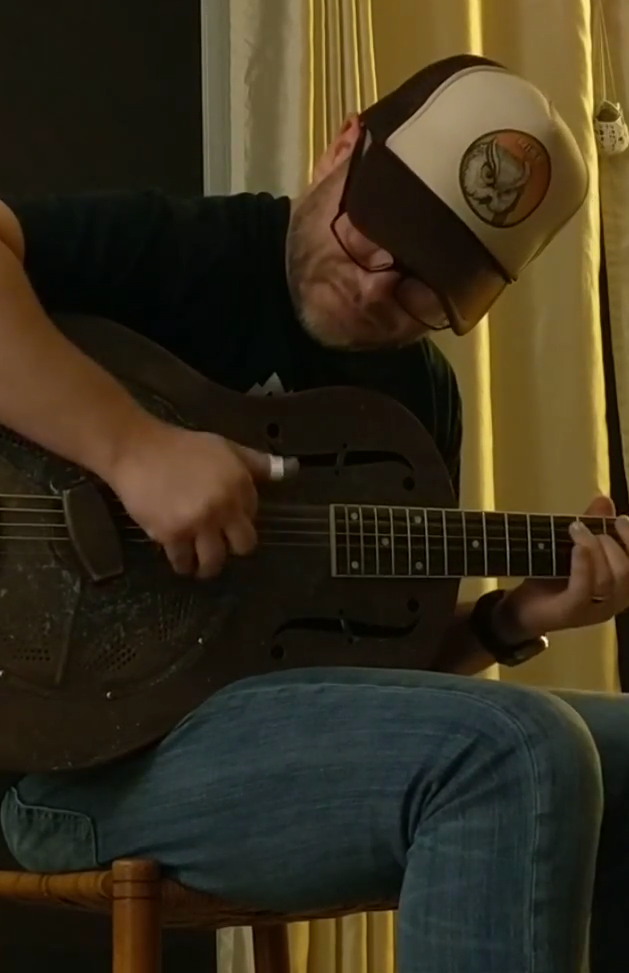
- Ross Hammond performing at a house concert in Pennsylvania in 2017.

Background information
- Born: August 10, 1977 (age 48); Lexington, Kentucky, U.S.
- Genres: Jazz, free jazz, avant-garde jazz
- Occupations: Musician, composer, promoter
- Instrument: Guitar
- Website: www.rosshammond.com

Ross Hammond (born August 10, 1977) is a Sacramento-based jazz guitarist, educator and concert promoter.

== Early life ==
Hammond was born August 10, 1977, in Lexington, Kentucky. He moved to Sacramento when he was 10 years old. Hammond started playing guitar, a gift from his mother, two years later. He wanted to play drums, but his mother was in favor of the more portable guitar. Hammond played rock, funk, and soul music in high school. He graduated from Christian Brothers High School in 1995.

== Education ==
He attended California State University Sacramento, where he received a degree in communication in 1999. "I was taking lessons from a really good guitar teacher named Jim Beeler, and he introduced me to Kenny Burrell and Grant Green and Wes Montgomery and Mark Whitfield. It was a step further than what I was already doing." While studying at CSUS, Hammond started a band called Chile Palmer.

== Performing and recording ==
His recording career as a leader began in 2003 with the album Gauche, followed by Optimism (2004), Sometimes Nocturnal (2005), Ross Hammond's Teakayo Mission (2007), Duets (2008), and Effective Use of Space (2009).

In 2008, Hammond and Byron Blackburn co-founded the In the Flow Jazz and Improvisational Music Festival. The festival emphasizes free form jazz and takes place annually in Sacramento.

Hammond started the new decade with the solo guitar album Ambience, Antiquite and Other Love Songs (2010). In 2012, he formed the Ross Hammond Quartet with multi-instrumentalist Vinny Golia, drummer Alex Cline, and bassist Steuart Liebig. The quartet released Adored in 2012 and Cathedrals in 2013. Both albums were recorded live in one day in a style reminiscent of classic jazz albums. Cathedrals received a four-star review in Downbeat and was named one of the top jazz releases of 2013. Jazz critic Ted Gioia named the album Upward (2016) by Hammond and Sameer Gupta thirty-fifth in his top 100 albums of the year.

== Work as an educator ==
Hammond has been teaching out of his studio, Gold Lion Arts in Sacramento, CA since 2013. In addition, he had an artist residency at Northern Arizona University in 2019, and spent a week doing individual lessons and small-group workshops, and also conducted a piece for the NAU large ensemble. He's taught music classes and workshops at Christian Brothers High School, River City High School, The Language Academy and William Land Elementary School in Sacramento. He's led improvisation and music career workshops at Sacramento City College and American River College.

== Music series curator ==
Hammond started the Nebraska Mondays series at Luna’s Cafe in 2009, which continues to this day. From 2006 until 2012, he programmed the In The Flow Jazz Festival in Sacramento, CA.

== Selected discography ==
=== As leader ===
- Gauche (2003) with Sameer Gupta and Gerry Pineda
- Optimism (2004) with Tom Monson and Gerry Pineda
- Sometimes Nocturnal (2005)
- Ross Hammond's Teakayo Mission (2007)
- Duets (2008)
- An Effective Use of Space (2009)
- Ambience, Antiquite and Other Love Songs (2010)
- Adored (2012)
- Cathedrals (2013)
- Perfect Plasticity (2014) with Catherine Sikora
- Blues and Daily News (2014) with Grant Calvin Weston
- Mean Crow (2015) with Luke Stewart and Nate Scheible
- Humanity Suite (2014) with Vinny Golia, Catherine Sikora, Clifford Childers, Kerry Kashiwagi and Dax Compise
- Flight (2015) solo acoustic
- Ross Hammond and Vinny Golia (2016)
- Follow Your Heart (2017) solo acoustic
- Masonic Lawn (2017) with Jon Bafus
- Songs of Universal Peace (2018) with Jay Nair
- Reprieve (2018) solo acoustic
- Riding Dragons In Winter (2018) solo resonator
- Mystery Well (2018) with Sameer Gupta
- New Milwaukee (2019) with Jon Bafus
- Sacramentans (2019) with Neil Franklin
- Chapel of St Philip Neri (2019) solo resonator
- Across Oceans (2019) with Poly Varghese
- Bells (2020) solo acoustic
- Our Place On The Wheel (2020) with Oliver Lake and Mike Pride
- Acoustic Sanctuary Project Volumes 1–5 (2020) Solo Acoustic
- Hope (2020) with Jay Nair
- Live at Gold Lion Arts (2021) with Sameer Gupta
- Bless (2021) with Grant Calvin Weston
- Carousel (2021) with Stateline
- Ghost Door (2021) with Jon Bafus
- It’s Been Here All Along (2021) solo resonator
- No Worries (2022) solo acoustic
- Roll Forward (2022) with Clifford Childers, Benwar Shepard and Devon Edmond
- Flow State (2022)
- Peace Talks EP (2022)
- Wired EP (2022)
- Lateral EP (2022)
- West Life EP (2022)
- Jazz Check EP (2023)
- Era EP (2023)
- Reflect EP (2023)

=== As co-leader/sideman ===
- Race Quintet: Travels (2004) Ross Hammond, Tony Passarell, Tom Monson, Erik Kleven, and Scott Anderson
- The Ni Project (2005)
- V Neck (2007)
- Electropoetic Coffee (2011)
- Revival Trio (2012)
- Amy Reed (2013)
- Upward (2016) with Sameer Gupta

=== Pandemic recordings ===
- Root (2020) with Grant Calvin Weston
- Between (2020) with JoAnn Anglin
- Earth Music (2020) with Mike Pride
- Small Lions (2020) with Tony Passarell
- Sound Quilts (2020) with Jon Raskin
- Fields (2020) with Neil Welch
- Lines (2020) with Alex Jenkins
- Vines (2020) with Thom Nguyen
- Dusk (2020) with Alan Cook
- Allies (2020) with Jon Bafus
- Music For Lighthouses (2020) with Kevin Corcoran
- Elements (2020) with Linda Michelle Hardy
- Frame (2020) with Lauri Goldston
- Wake (2020) with Mariano Rodriguez
