= Scott Amendola =

American drummer (born 1969)

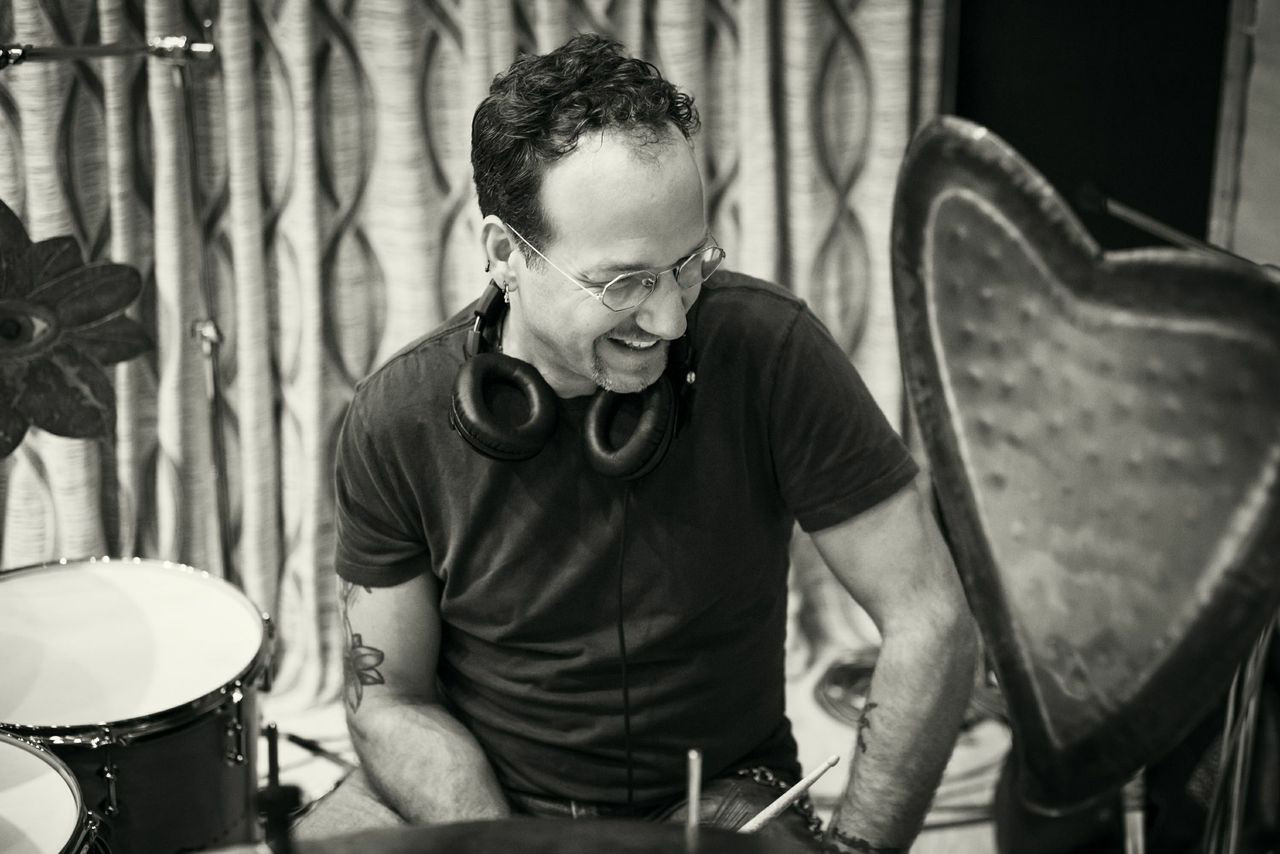
- Amendola in 2014

Background information
- Born: February 6, 1969 (age 57)
- Origin: New Jersey, U.S.
- Genres: Jazz; funk; rock; experimental
- Occupations: Drummer; composer; bandleader
- Instruments: Drums; percussion; electronics
- Labels: SAZi Records; Long Song; Cryptogramophone
- Member of: Scott Amendola Band
- Formerly of: Scott Amendola Trio; Orchestra Di Pazzi; Nels Cline Singers; Stretch Woven; Invisible Bird; Amendola vs. Blades
- Website: scottamendola.com

Scott Amendola (born February 6, 1969) is an American drummer from the San Francisco Bay Area. His styles include jazz, blues, groove, and rock.

== Early life and education ==
Amendola is originally from New Jersey and studied at the Berklee School of Music in Boston.

== Career ==
After relocating to California, he rose to popularity in the 1990s as a member of the band T.J. Kirk with Charlie Hunter, Will Bernard, and John Schott. Their second album, If Four Was One, received a Grammy Award nomination. Amendola has led his own bands and trios, which have included musicians such as Nels Cline, Jenny Scheinman, Jeff Parker, John Shifflett, Ben Goldberg, and Devin Hoff. He has recorded with Pat Martino, Jim Campilongo, G.E. Stinson, and Tony Furtado, among others. He is an original member of the Larry Ochs Sax & Drumming Core and has been a session percussionist for musicians such as Cris Williamson, Noe Venable, Carla Bozulich, and Odessa Chen.

In 2011, Amendola premiered his orchestral work Fade to Orange, performed in conjunction with the Oakland East Bay Symphony as one of their New Visions/New Vistas premieres. He was joined by Nels Cline and Trevor Dunn.

== Selected discography ==
with T.J. Kirk

- T.J. Kirk (1995)
- If Four Was One (1996)
- Talking Only Makes It Worse (2003)

with Phillip Greenlief/Scott Amendola Duo

- Collect My Thoughts (1995)

with Pat Martino

- All Sides Now (1997)

with Scott Amendola Band

- Scott Amendola Band (1999)
- Cry (2003)
- Believe (2005)
- Lift (2010)
- Fade to Orange (2015)

with The Nels Cline Singers

- Instrumentals (2000)
- The Giant Pin (2004)
- Draw Breath (2007)
- The Celestial Septet (2010) with Rova Saxophone Quartet
- Initiate (2010)
- Macroscope (2014)

with L. Stinkbug – Nels Cline, G.E. Stinson, Steuart Liebig, Scott Amendola

- The Allure of Roadside Curious (2002)

with Red Pocket – Jewlia Eisenberg, Marika Hughes, Scott Amendola

- Thick (2004)

with Nels Cline

- New Monastery (2006)
- Dirty Baby (2010)

with Plays Monk – Ben Goldberg, Devin Hoff, Scott Amendola

- Plays Monk (2007)

with Bill Frisell

- All Hat (2008)

with Ben Goldberg, Charlie Hunter, Ron Miles

- Go Home (2009)

with Charlie Hunter

- Not Getting Behind Is the New Getting Ahead (2012)
- Pucker (2013)
- Cars/Williams/Porter/Ellington (2014)

with John Dietrich, Ben Goldberg, Scott Amendola

- Short Sighted Dream Colossus (2012)

with Henry Kaiser/Scott Amendola

- Leaps (2015)

with Amendola vs. Blades

- Greatest Hits (2016)

with Invisible Bird – Dave Devine, Shane Endsley, Scott Amendola

- Flutter to Fuzz (2018)
