= Hold It Under a Faucet 7″ =

Hold It Under a Faucet 7"

EP by Nels Cline Trio
- Released: 2002
- Recorded: 1995
- Genre: Rock, noise
- Length: 8:10
- Label: Ecstatic Peace!, Father Yod
- Producer: Nels Cline Trio, Jeff Gauthier

Nels Cline Trio chronology
Sad (1998)	Hold It Under a Faucet 7" (2002)

Hold It Under a Faucet is an EP by the Nels Cline Trio that was recorded in 1995 but released in 2002.

According to Dusted magazine, "There are a few moments of free playing, but much of this record is in pounding rock mode" in which Cline aims for "sensory overload". He is accompanied by Michael Preussner on drums and Bob Mair on bass guitar. Cline said the songs were inspired by the Japanese rock band Boredoms.

== Track listing ==
1. "Hold It Under a Faucet (after Kirk Douglas)"
2. "Kaboo"
3. "Friends of Mine / Hose Beast"
4. "Hair Hang (for Thurston Moore)"

== Personnel ==
- Nels Cline – guitar
- Bob Mair – bass guitar, guitar
- Michael Preussner – drums
