= The Giant Pin =

Studio album by The Nels Cline Singers
- Released: September 14, 2004
- Recorded: August 24 & 25, 2003; Castle Oaks Studios in Calabasas, CA
- Genre: Rock, jazz
- Length: 73:04
- Label: Cryptogramophone; CG120
- Producer: Jeff Gauthier

The Nels Cline Singers chronology
Instrumentals (2002)	The Giant Pin (2004)	Draw Breath (2007)

The Giant Pin is the second album by The Nels Cline Singers led by American guitarist Nels Cline which was released in August 2003 on the Cryptogramophone label.

== Reception ==
Professional ratings
Review scores
Source	Rating
AllMusic	4/5 stars
All About Jazz	5/5 stars
Pitchfork	7.0/10
The Penguin Guide to Jazz Recordings	4/4 stars

The AllMusic review by William Tilland awarded the album 4 stars out of 5, stating "it offers the most dramatic example of Cline's general ability to synthesize beauty, emotion, intellect, technique, and even humor in his playing". Writing for All About Jazz, Alex K. Fong stated "The compositions on The Giant Pin simultaneously evoke traditional jazz, blues, post rock, and free improvisation without any of the awkward deliberateness found on the trio's debut release Instrumentals. That's a testament to the development of Cline's writing and the group's chemistry". Pitchfork's Sam Ubl stated "Cline has fused his jazz and rock interests before but The Giant Pin takes both poles to heretofore untouched extremes-- especially at the low-volume end of the spectrum. Stark stylistic and dynamic contrasts pervade the album, yet the transitions are smooth. The record is quieter and more restrained than other The Singers releases, making it a rewarding if slightly less exhilarating final product. Whether Cline will continue to cleave himself from the gigging life remains to be seen, but for now he's handling the balancing act quite nicely". JazzTimes' David R. Adler noted "Cline's music is resolutely left of the dial, a challenge. But its dynamics, rhythmic intensity and frequently searing melodicism are a joy. It's easy to imagine listeners of many stripes cottoning to his sound. (Might he lure Wilco fans toward far-out jazz?)".

== Track listing ==
All compositions by Nels Cline except as indicated

1. "Blues, Too" - 3:13
2. "Fly Fly" - 7:03
3. "He Still Carries a Torch for Her" - 6:43
4. "The Ballad of Devin Hoff" - 7:48
5. "The Friar" (Devin Hoff, Nels Cline, Scott Amendola) - 1:15
6. "Something About David H." - 10:12
7. "Bright Moon" - 11:03
8. "A Boy Needs a Door" - 4:34
9. "Square King" - 5:26
10. "Spell" - 9:22
11. "Watch Over Us" - 6:25

== Personnel ==
The Nels Cline Singers

- Nels Cline – electric guitar, effects
- Devin Hoff – contrabass
- Scott Amendola – drums, percussion, electronics, loops, mbira

Additional musicians

- Jon Brion – keyboards
- Greg Saunier – voice
