= Nine Winds =

- Founded: 1977
- Founder: Vinny Golia
- Genre: Free jazz, avant-garde jazz, avant-garde music
- Country of origin: U.S.
- Location: Los Angeles, California

Nine Winds is an American jazz record label that was founded in 1977 by Vinny Golia.

Golia is a self-taught musician who plays over fifty woodwind instruments, in addition to brass. In the early 1970s, he believed it was impossible for musicians who lived outside New York City to get contracts with record labels. He founded Nine Winds to produce his own albums and that of others who played free jazz, avant-garde jazz, and other forms of avant-garde music that were difficult to sell. He issued several of his own albums, then the debut album by guitarist Nels Cline. The roster grew to include unconventional music by Alex Cline, Jeff Gauthier, and Wayne Peet.

== Roster ==
- Aardvark Jazz Orchestra
- Steve Adams
- Susan Allen
- Eric Barber
- Bonnie Barnett
- Bill Barrett
- John Bergamo
- Dick Berk
- Ron Blakeslee
- Bobby Bradford
- Ellen Burr
- Paul Carman
- John Carter
- Luciano Chessa
- Alex Cline
- Nels Cline
- Ron Coulter
- Mark Dresser
- Brad Dutz
- Harris Eisenstadt
- Eric Von Essen
- Ken Filiano
- Stephen Flinn
- Bruce Fowler
- Lori Freedman
- Wolfgang Fuchs
- John Fumo
- Jeff Gauthier
- Matthew Goodheart
- Vinny Golia
- Jonathan Golove
- Phillip Greenlief
- John Gross
- Richard Grossman
- Rich Halley
- Joel Hamilton
- Edwin Harkins
- Rick Helzer
- Anna Homler
- Trey Henry
- David Earle Johnson
- Jeff Kaiser
- Kaoru
- Carla Kihlstedt
- Ronit Kirchman
- Larry Koonse
- Marilyn Lerner
- George Lewis
- Steuart Liebig
- Tony Malaby
- Billy Mintz
- Alex Nauman
- Giorgio Occhipinti
- Andrew Pask
- Wayne Peet
- Barre Phillips
- John Rapson
- Kim Richmond
- Bob Rodriguez
- William Roper
- Ken Rosser
- Matt Smiley
- Wadada Leo Smith
- Paul Smoker
- G.E. Stinson
- Mark Trayle
- Bertram Turetzky
- Johnnie Valentino
- Michael Vlatkovich
- Scott Walton
- Mark Weber
- Tad Weed
- Jeanette Wrate
