= Jeff Gauthier =

American violinist (born 1954)

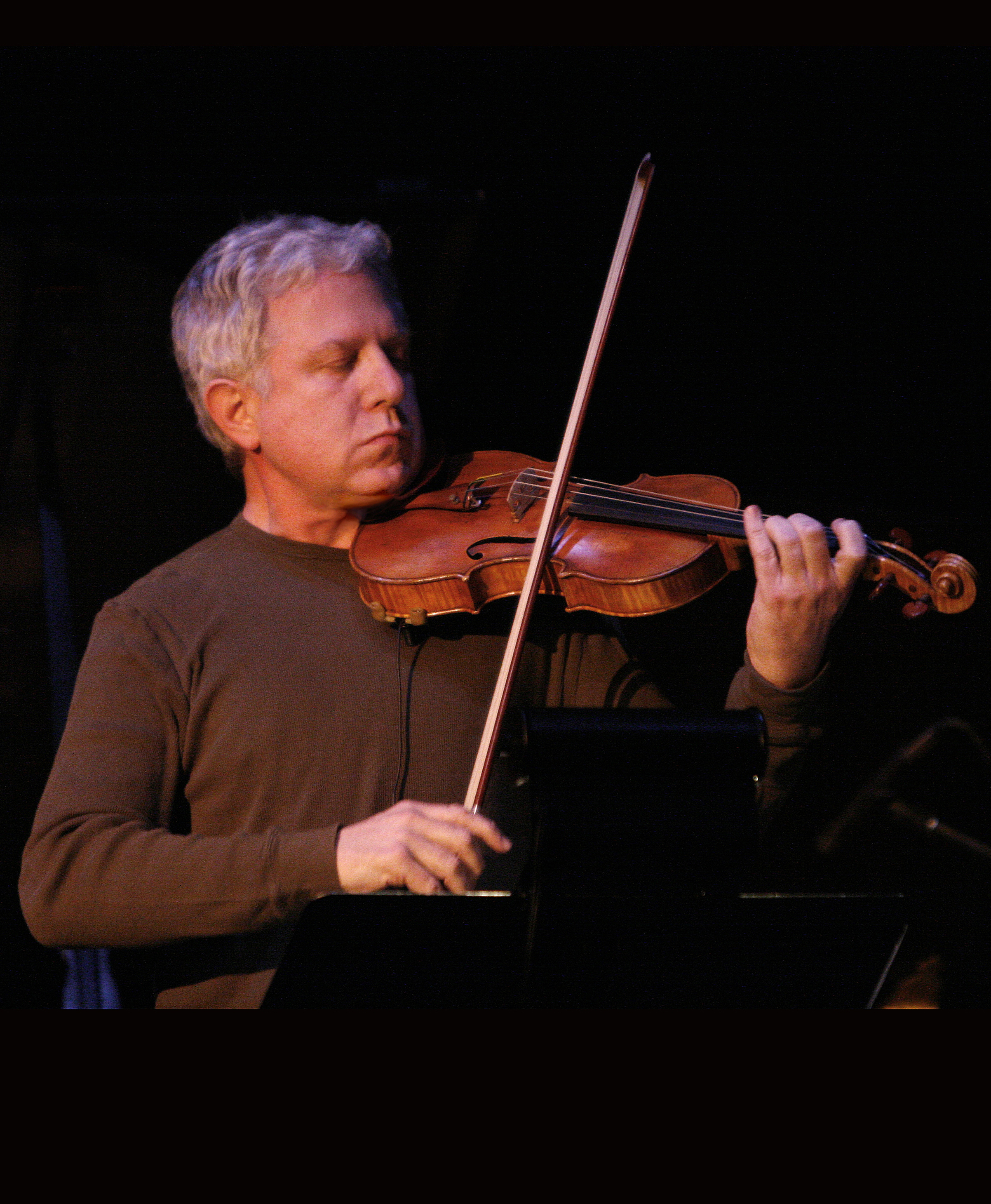
- with Todd Sickafoose Band

Background information
- Born: March 4, 1954 (age 72); Santa Monica, California, U.S.
- Genres: Jazz, avant-garde jazz, classical
- Occupation: Musician
- Instruments: violin, electric violin
- Years active: 1980s–present
- Labels: Cryptogramophone, Nine Winds Records
- Website: www.jeffgauthier.com

Jeff Gauthier is an American violinist who works with classical, jazz, new music, and free improvisation music. He is also active as a music producer and nonprofit consultant.

== Life and work ==
Violinist, composer, producer and nonprofit manager Jeff Gauthier grew up in Los Angeles, CA where he studied violin with his aunt Helen Pitzele, and Los Angeles Philharmonic member Armand Roth. During high school he discovered jazz and was awarded best soloist award by Gary Burton in the 1972 battle of the bands with the acclaimed Dorsey High School Jazz Band. After high school he studied classical violin and new music at the California Institute of Arts with Yoko Matsuda, Alan deVerich and later Glenn Dicterow and Harold Ayres.

Gauthier began his performing career in the late 1970s with musicians in the Southern California avant-garde scene. He was a founding member with Nels Cline, Alex Cline and Eric von Essen of the seminal acoustic ensemble Quartet Music, a creative presence in Los Angeles from 1979 to 1991. Quartet Music recorded four albums, received two NEA grants, was a member of the California Arts Council touring roster, and performed twice as soloists with the Milwaukee Symphony.

As an improvising violinist, he performed and recorded with Yusef Lateef & Adam Rudolph on the album The World At Peace for Meta Records, The Alex Cline Ensemble on albums for ECM & Cryptogramophone, and Nels Cline's Lovers project on Blue Note Records. His own ensemble, the Jeff Gauthier Goatette has recorded six CDs including Internal Memo and The Present for Nine Winds Records, and Mask, One and the Same, House of Return and Open Source for Cryptogramophone. Mask was nominated for a 2002 AFIM Indie Award. He has also performed in ensembles with bassist Mark Dresser (Banquet) and recorded with drummer Gregg Bendian (Bone Structure), and four CDs with Steuart Liebig (Quartetto Stig). He also recorded two trio albums with Alex Cline and G.E. Stinson for Cryptogramophone (Rite of Violet and The Other Shore). Currently Gauthier performs with his wife, 'cellist Maggie Parkins in the improvisational duo The Smudges.

Gauthier has been named a Downbeat "Rising Star" several times as both violinist and producer in the Downbeat Critics Poll. As a producer Gauthier has worked with Alan Broadbent, Nels Cline, Mark Dresser, Peter Erskine, Erik Friedlander Bennie Maupin, Jimmy Rowles, Stacy Rowles, Alan Pasqua, Todd Sickafoose and many others, recording CDs for Cryptogramophone, Delos, New World and Nine Winds Records. As a classical violinist Gauthier has performed with the Los Angeles Chamber Orchestra, Los Angeles Music Center Opera, Los Angeles Master Chorale, Long Beach Symphony, Oregon Bach Festival and Carmel Bach Festival. He performed on the 2000 Grammy Award winning CD Credo by Penderecki with the Oregon Bach Festival Orchestra and Chorus under conductor Helmuth Rilling. He also worked in the Los Angeles studio scene on numerous movies and TV shows including soundtracks for almost every episode of the Star Trek series The Next Generation, Voyager and Deep Space Nine.

As executive director of the Jazz Bakery from 2011 to 2018, Gauthier managed one of the most important jazz organizations in Southern California. He was also co-artistic director of the acclaimed Angel City Jazz Festival with Rocco Somazzi, and co-founder and executive director of Angel City Arts, its nonprofit parent organization. He has produced several concert series in Los Angeles, including the Inner Ear series and the long-running Cryptonight new music series at the Club Tropical in Culver City. He was founder of and producer for Cryptogramophone Records which was named the #4 Best Jazz Label in the 2007 DownBeat Critics Poll, and has become one of the premiere West Coast labels for cutting-edge jazz.

As a grant writer and nonprofit consultant, Gauthier has worked with organizations like Western Arts Alliance, Broad Museum, Hear Now Festival, Jazz Bakery, Angel City Arts, Brightwork newmusic, Eclipse Quartet, and Piano Spheres.

== Discography ==
- Internal Memo (Nine Winds, 1993)
- The Present (Nine Winds, 1996)
- Mask (Cryptogramophone, 2002)
- One and the Same (Cryptogramophone, 2006)
- House of Return (Cryptogramophone, 2008)
- Open Source (Cryptogramophone, 2011)
- The Smudges: Song and Call (Cryptogramophone, 2022)

== Sources ==
- Bielefelder Katalog 1988 & 2002
- Richard Cook, Brian Morton: The Penguin Guide to Jazz on CD. 6. Auflage. Penguin, London 2002, ISBN 0-14-051521-6
