= New Monastery =

Studio album by Nels Cline
- Released: September 26, 2006
- Recorded: February 3 & 4, 2006
- Genre: Jazz
- Length: 73:36
- Label: Cryptogramophone; CG130

Nels Cline chronology
Four Guitars Live (2006)	New Monastery (2006)	Draw Breath (2007)

New Monastery (subtitled A View Into the Music of Andrew Hill) is an album by American guitarist Nels Cline performing compositions by Andrew Hill which was released in September 2006 on the Cryptogramophone label.

== Reception ==
Professional ratings
Review scores
Source	Rating
Allmusic	4.5/5 stars
All About Jazz	4.5/5 stars
The Penguin Guide to Jazz Recordings	3.5/4 stars

The Allmusic review by Thom Jurek awarded the album 4½ stars out of 5, stating "Hill's work does not suffer for its interpretations by Cline and company; it breathes in a new context, one that understands his own. This is a fine and important date and necessary listening for those who care about the composer or are just coming to him, or about Cline and his own development. Essential listening". Writing for All About Jazz, John Kelman stated "With his sextet of highly flexible players, Cline has fashioned an homage that clearly references its source, while at the same time feeling completely within Cline's own musical universe. Hill will no doubt be proud". JazzTimes' Bill Milkowski noted "While this tribute is obviously done with great reverence for Andrew Hill’s oeuvre, Cline doesn’t hesitate to lob hand grenades into the proceedings from time to time. I expect nothing less from the guy who successfully tackled John Coltrane’s Interstellar Space".

== Track listing ==
All compositions by Andrew Hill

1. "McNeil Island / Pumpkin" - 6:20
2. "Not Sa No Sa" - 8:55
3. "No Doubt / 11/8 / Dance With Death" - 23:32
4. "Yokada Yokada / The Rumproller" - 4:48
5. "Dedication" - 8:03
6. "Reconciliation / New Monastery" - 10:30
7. "Compulsion" - 11:09

== Personnel ==
- Nels Cline – guitar, effects
- Bobby Bradford - cornet
- Ben Goldberg - clarinet, contra-alto clarinet
- Andrea Parkins - electric accordion, effects
- Devin Hoff - contrabass
- Scott Amendola - drums, percussion
- Alex Cline - percussion (tracks 5 & 7)
