= John Rapson =

American jazz trombonist and educator (born 1953)

Ira John Rapson, III (February 4, 1953, Gary, Indiana – July 21, 2021, Iowa City, Iowa) was an American jazz trombonist and educator.

Rapson began on piano at age five before switching to trombone. He studied at Westmont College, graduating in 1976, then took his MA in composition at California State University. Rapson taught at Westmont from 1980 to 1990, concurrently playing in Los Angeles with Vinny Golia (1979–1990). He also worked with Tim Berne (1980, 1986), Walter Thompson (1980), Bobby Bradford (1986–1990), and John Carter (1988–1990). He worked extensively as a leader with noted West Coast jazz players. His sextet, active from 1982 to 1985, included Golia, Wayne Peet, Alex Cline, and Roberto Miguel Miranda; his octet, active from 1985 to 1990, had Golia, Cline, Ken Filiano, John Fumo, Kim Richmond or Steve Fowler, and Bill Roper as members. He also led a trio in 1986–1987 with Golia and Miranda.

Rapson moved to the East Coast in 1990, studying at Wesleyan University, where he pursued his doctorate in ethnomusicology. He played with Anthony Braxton in 1992 and worked with Ed Blackwell (1990–1991), Jay Hoggard (1990–1992), and Allen Lowe (1991–1992). He again led a sextet from 1992 to 1999 with Braxton, Bradford, Peet, Roper, and Cline. In 1993 he became a faculty member of the University of Iowa School of Music, where he was director of jazz studies and conductor of the school's Johnson County Landmark jazz band. He led his own big band in 1994, the OftENsemble, and formed the Oddball Trio Plus Trombone in 1996 with Steve Grismore.

== Discography ==
=== As leader ===
- Bu-Wah (Nine Winds, 1986)
- Bing (Sound Aspects, 1990)
- Dances & Orations (Music & Arts, 1996)
- Water and Blood (Nine Winds, 2001)

=== As sideman ===
With Vinny Golia

- The Gift of Fury (Nine Winds, 1982)
- Compositions for Large Ensembles (Nine Winds, 1984)
- Deeba Dah Bwee (Nine Winds, 1985)
- Facts of Their Own Lives (Nine Winds, 1988)
- Pilgrimage to Obscurity (Nine Winds, 1989)

With others

- 7X Tim Berne, (Empire, 1980)
- Stardate, Walter Thompson (Dane, 1980)
- Headless Household, Josef Woodard and Dick Dunlap (HH, 1987)
- New Tango '92: After Ástor Piazzolla, Julius Hemphill and Allen Lowe (Fairhaven, 1991)
- Mental Strain at Dawn: A Modern Portrait of Louis Armstrong, Doc Cheatham and David Murray (Stash, 1992)
- 4 (Ensemble) Compositions 1992, Anthony Braxton (Black Saint, 1993)

As director

- Been There, Done That (University of Iowa Johnson County Landmark, John Rapson, director, self-production, 1995)
- A Mingus Among Us (University of Iowa Johnson County Landmark, John Rapson, director, self-production, 1996)
