= The Celestial Septet =

Studio album by The Nels Cline Singers and Rova Saxophone Quartet
- Released: March 2010
- Recorded: May 28, 2008
- Genre: Jazz
- Length: 68:54
- Labels: New World; 80708
- Producer: Larry Ochs

The Nels Cline Singers chronology
Draw Breath (2007)	The Celestial Septet (2010)	Initiate (2010)

Rova Saxophone Quartet chronology
The Mirror World (2006)	The Celestial Septet (2008)	Planetary (2010)

The Celestial Septet is an album by The Nels Cline Singers and Rova Saxophone Quartet which was released in March 2010 on the New World label.

== Reception ==
Professional ratings
Review scores
Source	Rating
Allmusic	4/5 stars

The Allmusic review by François Couture awarded the album 4 stars out of 5, stating "a thrilling record, and one of Rova's most artistically successful collaborations... The Celestial Septet features a high level of amalgamation between the two ensembles and, honestly, one wishes for this combination to carry on. Rova and Nels Cline Singers are more than compatible; they complement each other's compositions".

== Track listing ==
All compositions by Larry Ochs except as indicated

1. "Cesar Chávez" (Scott Amendola) - 12:46
2. "Trouble Ticket" (Steve Adams) - 12:27
3. "Whose To Know [For Albert Ayler]" - 25:22
4. "Head Count" - 2:21
5. "The Buried Quilt" (Nels Cline) - 15:58

== Personnel ==
The Nels Cline Singers

- Nels Cline – guitar
- Devra Hoff – bass
- Scott Amendola – drums

Rova Saxophone Quartet

- Bruce Ackley – soprano saxophone, tenor saxophone
- Steve Adams – alto saxophone, sopranino saxophone
- Larry Ochs – tenor saxophone, sopranino saxophone
- Jon Raskin – baritone saxophone, alto saxophone, sopranino saxophone
