= Armen Nalbandian =

British-Armenian jazz pianist, author & activist (born 1978)

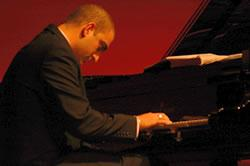

Background information
- Born: April 6, 1978 (age 48); Manchester, England
- Genres: Jazz, free jazz, avant-garde jazz, electronic, classical, experimental
- Occupations: Musician, pianist, composer, record producer, conductor
- Instruments: Piano, Fender Rhodes
- Years active: 1996–present
- Labels: Blacksmith Brother, Noise Boutique, Wax Poetics
- Website: www.armennalbandian.com

Armen Nalbandian (born April 6, 1978, in Manchester, England) is a British-born Armenian American jazz pianist, composer, author, and activist from Los Angeles, California.

== Music ==
Highly influenced by Thelonious Monk, Nalbandian performs jazz, free and avant-garde jazz, improvised and experimental music. While his primary ensemble is the Armen Nalbandian Trio, he has led more than 30 different ensembles and composed over 1200 works ranging from music for string quartets, chamber music, orchestral music, electronic music, scores for theater, experimental hiphop, new Japanese and Armenian inspired folk music, and John Zorn inspired "game pieces" in addition to having performed a solo piano concert of Zorn's Masada music with the encouragement and blessing of the composer. His past ensembles have included the Armen Nalbandian Trio (with Eric Revis and Nasheet Waits), Armen Nalbandian V (with Jeff Parker Chris Speed, Eric Revis, and Alex Cline), and the Armen Nalbandian 3 (with Steve Lehman and Guillermo E. Brown).

He cites witnessing a Cecil Taylor performance at LA's Jazz Bakery when he was 19 years old as a turning point in his life and career.

He is the protege of jazz pianist John Hicks but also credits Bill Dixon and McCoy Tyner for being important teachers in addition to Charlie Haden, Jackie McLean, Horace Silver, Cedar Walton, Billy Higgins, Art Farmer, and Harold Land.

Nalbandian’s collaborators have included Billy Higgins, Han Bennink, Eric Revis, Nasheet Waits, Jeff Parker, Steve Lehman, Chris Speed, Guillermo E. Brown, Alex Cline, Dave King, Koichi Makigami, and Chris Corsano.

Nalbandian is also known for his multidisciplinary collaborations in visual and fine art which include a four-year residency at the Fresno Art Museum where he served as music director and Artist-in-Residence. Additional collaborations have included compositions featuring poets Sunni Patterson, Lee Herrick, and Tim Z. Hernandez; as a member of Nino Moschella's touring band for The Fix and Boom Shadow, composing and arranging the Music of Mexico for the Fresno Philharmonic, and composing the score for The Artist's Repertory Theater production of One Flew over the Cuckoo's Nest. He established the record label Blacksmith Brother in 2006.

In 2008, Nalbandian was named a finalist in the 2008 Gilles Peterson Worldwide Talent Search and has received praise from Dave Douglas, Susie Ibarra, and Matthew Shipp.

In 2011 and 2012, Nalbandian had multiple improvised performances with comedian Dave Chappelle at Yoshi's Jazz Club in Oakland and San Francisco.

In 2017, Nalbandian premiered two new ensembles to add to his work with his trio with Eric Revis and Nasheet Waits and his solo piano work. The first, a new quintet named Armen Nalbandian V featuring Chris Speed, Jeff Parker, Eric Revis & Alex Cline and the Armen Nalbandian 3 with Steve Lehman & Guillermo E. Brown; loosely inspired by Cecil Taylor's trio with Jimmy Lyons and Andrew Cyrille.

In October 2017, he premiered a solo piano piece by Wadada Leo Smith entitled "Majestic".

In May 2023, Nalbandian released The Complex Relationship Between Two Simple Machines Machines, a spontaneously composed album with David King & Chris Speed. The album’s title is derived from the combined practice of Senegalese physicist Oumar Haidara Fall and Spanish artist Rubén Ramos Balsa which presents a unification of theories from different realms of physics. In September 2023 he released A Spontaneous Breaking of Symmetry I. the first volume in a series of duo recordings with drummer Chris Corsano.

== Recordings ==
=== Armen ===
Released in March 2006, Armen was Nalbandian's debut album as a leader and the debut recording featuring the first Armen Nalbandian Trio. The recording features Nalbandian on piano, and contains five original compositions by Nalbandian, and five by other composers including the rarely performed Thelonious Monk composition "Oska T", and the traditional spiritual "This Train". Nalbandian's composition "Need" is dedicated to memory of pianist Kenny Kirkland.

=== Manchester Born ===
Manchester Born was released in November 2007 and features The Armen Nalbandian Trio. This was Armen Nalbandian's debut recording on the Fender Rhodes. The recording consists of ten compositions by Nalbandian and is dedicated to his mentor John Hicks, and in memory of Alice Coltrane and Andrew Hill.

=== Young Kings Get Their Heads Cut Off ===
Initially inspired by avant-garde drummer Chris Corsano's solo drum album The Young Cricketer and the music of Ikue Mori, Armen Nalbandian's first solo recording was named after a painting by Jean-Michel Basquiat and features Nalbandian on the "prepared" Fender Rhodes. The recording was made by Nalbandian performing primarily on the inside of the Fender Rhodes, treating it as a percussion instrument, manipulating the hammers with drum cymbals, snare drum heads, wrenches, mallets, and keys. Nalbandian also employed an analog delay pedal and a wah-wah pedal. The recording is completely improvised with the exception of the composition "Blues to Steve Lacy", which was composed by trumpeter Dave Douglas. The sound of the album has elicit comparisons to Miles Davis' Bitches Brew and John Cage's prepared piano music. The album has been featured heavily on WFMU, called by Rolling Stone Magazine, The Village Voice, CMJ and the New York Press as "the best radio station in the country."

=== Tirez Sur Le Pianiste & To Repel Ghosts ===
To Repel Ghosts is an experimental electronic production and live album comprising eleven compositions by Nalbandian. The album is Nalbandian's second recording named after the work of artist Jean-Michel Basquiat. To Repel Ghosts was Nalbandian's first digital-only album, released exclusively on the artist's website in its first year. Nalbandian's album Tirez Sur Le Pianiste (Shoot the Piano Player) was released nine months before and includes three compositions that also appear on To Repel Ghosts. The music on both albums has been compared to Kid A/Amnesiac-era Radiohead and the LA beat scene.

=== Coup de Grace ===
On August 23, 2011, Nalbandian released two distinctly different albums. The first, Coup de Grace, is a live recording featuring Nalbandian on piano and drummer Han Bennink in an improvised duet setting. Bennink, perhaps best known as one of the pivotal figures in early European free jazz and free improvisation, is the co-founder of the Instant Composers Pool (ICP). Nalbandian and Bennink conclude the performance with a rendition of Ornette Coleman's "Lonely Woman".

In both concept and art direction, Coup de Grace references Peter Brötzmann's 1968 album Machine Gun, which also features Bennink.

=== Quiet As It's Kept ===
Quiet As It's Kept, is the first studio recording of the Armen Nalbandian Trio with Eric Revis on bass and Nasheet Waits on drums. Nalbandian is featured on the Fender Rhodes. The trio recording contains first takes of solely original compositions by Nalbandian.

Nalbandian is among an elite group of artists that perform with the Revis/Waits tandem which include Peter Brötzmann, Tarbaby, Oliver Lake, Kurt Rosenwinkel, and Revis' own Parallax Quartet (with Ken Vandermark and Jason Moran). Quiet As It's Kept has been featured Los Angeles-based radio station KCRW.

=== Surrounded by Snakes ===
On March 15, 2013, he released his 8th album, Surrounded by Snakes, a 13-song album consisting of original compositions that feature him in an experimental electronic setting with improvised solos. Nalbandian is the sole producer and instrumentalist on the album. The album artwork was designed by Joshua Asante of the Arkansas blues bands Velvet Kente and Amasa Hines. The album artwork was designed by Joshua Asante of the Arkansas blues bands Velvet Kente and Amasa Hines.

=== Time Waits ===
Inspired by the intimacy and sparseness of Keith Jarrett's album The Melody at Night, with You, Nalbandian released his first solo piano album, Time Waits, on May 23, 2014. It consists of eight compositions, including a reworking of "Conflicted" from his album Manchester Born. The additional material includes "I Get Along Without You Very Well" by Hoagy Carmichael and popularized by Frank Sinatra, "Ugly Beauty" by Thelonious Monk, and "Motion Picture Soundtrack" by Radiohead. Time Waits and Alis Grave Nil consist of performances recorded at Nino Moschella's Bird & Egg studio.

=== Alis Grave Nil ===
Nalbandian's tenth album, Alis Grave Nil, is a follow-up to Time Waits. Originating from the same solo piano recording session as Time Waits; it was released on July 23, 2014. Alis Grave Nil (translated from Latin meaning "nothing is heavy to those who have wings") includes compositions by Nalbandian, Charlie Chaplin, Eubie Blake, & the first part of fellow LA-native Kendrick Lamar's song Sing About Me, I'm Dying of Thirst from his album Good Kid M.A.A.D. City. The album artwork of both "Time Waits" and "Alis Grave Nil" feature paintings by Armen Nalbandian created only months prior to the recordings. Nalbandian has referred to both solo albums as "a requiem of my early career." Nalbandian contends "there is a great deal of symbolism throughout the first 10 albums and they are connected in many ways, AGN concludes the story."

=== 2018 Albums ===
In 2018, Nalbandian released 8 albums chronicling his studio and live performances from 2017. The recordings cover his solo piano work, trio and V. The albums were released one at a time, each month for the first 8 months of 2018, culminating with a live trio performance in September 2018 in memory of Cecil Taylor, who had died earlier in the year.

== Activism ==
Nalbandian has most often used his platform to recognize social and civil injustice and perform many humanitarian services. He has raised thousands of dollars in aid for the victims of Hurricane Katrina by way of many benefit concerts. Nalbandian has also raised money for organizations as diverse as The United Way, The Red Cross, the ONE Campaign, Habitat for Humanity, The American Cancer Society, Breast Cancer Research and The Relay for Life Foundation, among others.

In September 2009, Nalbandian appeared in the play Semblance: Notes from the Promised Land by Devoya Mayo. The final act of the play featured a soliloquy written and performed by Nalbandian, critical of the Bush administration's response to Hurricane Katrina in New Orleans. Nalbandian has made critical comments from the bandstand regarding America's proposed cuts to funding for the arts and its withdrawal from the Paris Climate Accord, never addressing the administration by name.

== Visual and fine art collaborations ==
From 2004 to 2008, Nalbandian served as the Artist-in-Residence/Music Director of the Fresno Art Museum, artistic director of Jazz @ the F.A.M., artistic director of the F.O.R.M. (Festival of Resurrected Music), and curator of the Rhythms of Art in which he composed concerts of original music inspired by the exhibitions at the Fresno Art Museum on a monthly basis. The programming also included educational components for children and adults, concerts which highlighted the music of jazz masters and supplemental concerts that focused on collaboration. While Nalbandian's first season musically focused on a primarily traditional foundation, primarily inspired by Duke Ellington, his approach and compositions for the following 3 seasons were highly inspired by the Association for the Advancement of Creative Musicians (AACM), Wadada Leo Smith, Bill Dixon, Anthony Braxton, Henry Threadgill & The Art Ensemble of Chicago.

Nalbandian concluded his artistic residency at the Fresno Art Museum by performing a solo piano program of composer John Zorn's Masada music encouraged with the composer's blessing.

Nalbandian has often referenced the art of Jean-Michel Basquiat in his early work and song titles; compositions throughout his early discography reference specific Basquiat paintings and graffiti. Nalbandian presented a concert inspired by Basquiat's work in March 2008 during his tenure as Artist-in-Residence at the Fresno Art Museum.

Nalbandian has also composed and premiered music inspired by the work of Kerry James Marshall, Theaster Gates, Kara Walker, David Hammons, Arshille Gorky, Anne Scheid, and Garo Antreasian, who wrote of Nalbandian's work in his 2016 biography, Reflections on Life and Art.

In March 2017, Nalbandian premiered a new composition, Heirloom, with his trio with Revis and Waits inspired by "Heirlooms and Accessories" by Kerry James Marshall after several viewings at both Marshall's retrospective at the Museum of Contemporary Art, Los Angeles, and The Underground Museum.

== Discography ==
- Armen (2006)
- Manchester Born (2007)
- Young Kings Get Their Heads Cut Off (2007)
- Tirez Sur Le Pianiste (2009) (EP)
- To Repel Ghosts (2010)
- Quiet As It's Kept (2011)
- Coup de Grace (2011)
- Surrounded by Snakes (2013)
- Time Waits (2014)
- Alis Grave Nil (2014)
- The Holy Ghost (2018)
- Fire Sign (2018)
- V (2018)
- Live in Little Tokyo Vol. I (2018)
- AMEN (2018)
- Prayer (2018)
- Orbits (2018)
- Live in Little Tokyo Vol. II (2018)
- Ghosts (2019)
- Live on Sunset (2019)
- The Complex Relationship Between Two Simple Machines (2023)
- A Spontaneous Breaking of Symmetry I. (2023)
- Death, Infinity and Zero (2023)
- A Spontaneous Breaking of Symmetry II. (2024)
- A Spontaneous Breaking of Symmetry III. (2024)
- Studies on Resonance and Dissonance (2025)

== Bibliography ==
- Portrait of an Artist as a Young Improviser: Writings 2006-2007 by Armen Nalbandian (2013 Blacksmith Brother) ISBN 9781301432417. Essays and entries focusing on Nalbandian's compositions from 2006 to 2007.
