= Coward (Nels Cline album) =

Studio album by Nels Cline
- Released: February 10, 2009
- Recorded: April 13–18, 2008
- Genre: Jazz
- Length: 72:25
- Label: Cryptogramophone; CG141
- Producer: Jeff Gauthier

Nels Cline chronology
| Draw Breath (2007) | Coward (2009) | Dirty Baby (2010) |

Coward is a solo album by American guitarist Nels Cline which was released in October 2009 on the Cryptogramophone label.

== Reception ==
Professional ratings
Review scores
| Source | Rating |
|---|---|
| AllMusic | 4/5 stars |
| All About Jazz | 5/5 stars |
| Pitchfork Media | 6.9/10 |

The AllMusic review by Michael G. Nastos states, "This sounds like a very personal and emotional project, certainly one that is rendered from the heart, and must be listened to with the challenged bravery and wide open ears that ignorant, frightened people and those afraid of living life will never, ever experience".

Writing for All About Jazz, John Kelman stated "Like the best solo guitar albums, Coward transcends being merely an exercise in the instrument's vast potential—though it is that, too. Impossible to create without Cline's unequivocal virtuosity, the largely acoustic Coward remains about everything but guitaristic acumen. Instead it's an instrumental masterpiece, further positioning Cline as one of today's most open-minded composers, players and musical conceptualists. Despite its not inconsiderable challenges, it retains a surprisingly broad appeal, making it a true classic that will likely keep aspiring guitarists scratching their heads for years to come".

Pitchfork's Mark Masters stated "There's no doubt that Coward is a worthy addition to his canon, but the chances of it being anyone's go-to Cline disc are roughly the same as someone listing a compilation as their favorite album".

== Track listing ==
All compositions by Nels Cline

1. "Epiphyllum" - 4:21
2. "Prayer Wheel" - 5:00
3. "Thurston County" - 7:04
4. "The Androgyne" - 3:11
5. "Rod Poole's Gradual Ascent to Heaven" - 18:41
6. "The Divine Homegirl" - 4:24
7. "X Change(s)" - 4:20
8. "The Nomad's Home" - 3:43
9. "Onan (Suite): Amniotica" - 2:48
10. "Onan (Suite): Lord & Lady" - 5:00
11. "Onan (Suite): Dreams in the Mirror" - 1:38
12. "Onan (Suite): Interruption (Onan's Psychedelic Breakdown)" - 1:51
13. "Onan (Suite): Seedcaster" - 3:12
14. "Onan (Suite): Liberator" - 3:21
15. "Cymbidium" - 3:51

== Personnel ==
- Nels Cline – electric guitar, acoustic guitar, sruti box, autoharp, zither, megamouth, kaossilator, quintronics drum buddy
