= Instrumentals (Nels Cline Singers album) =

Studio album by The Nels Cline Singers
- Released: March 26, 2002
- Recorded: August 29 & 30, 2001; The Bakery, Hollywood CA
- Genres: Rock, jazz
- Length: 76:39
- Labels: Cryptogramophone; CG113
- Producer: Jeff Gautier

The Nels Cline Singers chronology
Instrumentals (2002)	The Giant Pin (2003)

Instrumentals is the debut album by The Nels Cline Singers led by American guitarist Nels Cline which was released in March 2002 on the Cryptogramophone label.

== Reception ==
Professional ratings
Review scores
Source	Rating
Allmusic	4.5/5 stars
All About Jazz	4/5 stars
Pitchfork Media	8.0/10
The Penguin Guide to Jazz Recordings	3.5/4 stars

The Allmusic review by Thom Jurek awarded the album 4½ stars out of 5, stating "This is one of Cline's strongest and most innovative efforts". All About Jazz stated "Jazz fans without an ear open to rock rhythms, energy music, or punk sensibility will almost certainly fail to appreciate what the Nels Cline Singers have done on Instrumentals. But Cline doesn't really care about that. His music is a defining statement of identity, a cry from the heart without pretense or ambiguity. For the open-minded, this record will stack up as one of the very best of the year. It's deep, exciting, and viscerally satisfying". Pitchfork Media's Sam Ubl stated "While Instrumentals suffers a bit in comparison to Cline's previous studio work with the huge Destroy All Nels Cline ensemble, it's mostly because the three-piece lineup curtails some of the wild tonal exploration done on that record. Don't fret, though, these folks still have an awful lot going for them". JazzTimes' Ron Wynn noted "There's certainly a lot to admire about what Nels Cline is doing on much of Instrumentals, but there's just too much chaos during those segments that don't work".

== Track listing ==
All compositions by Nels Cline

1. " A Mug Like Mine" - 9:03
2. "Cause for Concern" - 4:22
3. "Suspended Head" - 6:42
4. "Harbor Child" - 6:11
5. "Lowered Boom" - 6:47
6. "Lucia" - 12:38
7. "Ghost of the Piñata" - 7:47
8. "Blood Drawing" - 15:27
9. "Slipped Away" - 7:52

== Personnel ==
The Nels Cline Singers

- Nels Cline – electric guitar, electric 12 string guitar, baritone guitar
- Devra Hoff – contrabass
- Scott Amendola – drums, percussion, effects, loops
