= G. E. Stinson =

American guitarist

Gregory E. Stinson, better known as G. E. Stinson (born in Kingfisher, Oklahoma), is an American guitarist and founding member of new age/electronic musical group Shadowfax. Inspired by blues masters such as Bo Diddley and Muddy Waters, Stinson experimented with blues, jazz and other musical genres before co-founding Shadowfax in 1974. He remained with the band for six albums. He departed Shadowfax after recording The Odd Get Even (1989), entering the Los Angeles underground music community to refine his 'extended technique' and 'frequency manipulation'. Since then he has worked with a number of musicians on various projects, including Napalm Quartet, Splinter Group, Stinkbug, Metalworkers, Alex De Grassi, Devin Sarno and others. In 2000, he collaborated with drummer Gregg Bendian, violinist Jeff Gauthier, and bassist Steuart Liebig on an album of collective improvisational pieces recorded live in the studio, entitled Bone Structure. Released in 2003, it was given four stars by Jim Andrews in DownBeat magazine.

Stinson is a long-time Zen-practitioner.

== Discography ==
- The Same Without You (Nine Winds, 1992)
- Thousand Other Names (Birdcage, 1996)
- Vapor (Ecstatic Peace!, 1999)
- The Other Shore with Alex Cline, Jeff Gauthier (Cryptogramophone, 2000)
- Shortwave Postcard with Alex de Grassi, (Auditorium, 2001)
- Bone Structure with Gregg Bendian, Jeff Gauthier, and Steuart Liebig (Cryptogramophone, 2003)

With Alex Cline

- Right of Violet (1995)
- Sparks Fly Upward (1999)
- The Constant Flame (2001)
- Cloud Plate (2006)
- For People in Sorrow (Cryptogramophone, 2013)

With Nels Cline

- Destroy All Nels Cline (Atavistic, 2001)
- Elevating Device (Sounds Are Active, 2009)

With Shadowfax

- 1976 Watercourse Way
- 1982 Shadowfax
- 1983 Shadowdance
- 1985 The Dreams of Children
- 1986 Too Far to Whisper
- 1987 Folksongs for a Nuclear Village
- 1990 The Odd Get Even

With The Choir Boys

- 2006 The Choir Boys With Strings
