= The Inkling =

Studio album by Nels Cline
- Released: May 30, 2000
- Recorded: May 25 & 26, 1999
- Genre: Jazz
- Length: 64:56
- Label: Cryptogramophone; CG105
- Producer: Jeff Gauthier

Nels Cline chronology
Sad (1998)	The Inkling (2000)	Destroy All Nels Cline (2001)

The Inkling is an album by American guitarist Nels Cline which was released in May 2000 on the Cryptogramophone label.

== Reception ==
Professional ratings
Review scores
Source	Rating
Allmusic	4/5 stars
The Penguin Guide to Jazz Recordings	3/4 stars

The Allmusic review by Rick Anderson awarded the album 4 stars out of 5, stating "Melodically, Cline is clearly influenced by Derek Bailey, but his tone and execution are all his, and his compositions reward the effort it sometimes takes to follow them. Recommended". Writing for All About Jazz, Michael Parker stated "this is unique music that might very well slip through the cracks of the improv, jazz, and rock worlds, but such an oversight would be unfair indeed". JazzTimes' Bill Milkowski noted "Nels Cline is normally known for his distortion-laced banshee wail on electric guitar, but his Inkling quartet affords him the opportunity to communicate on a softer dynamic with Mark Dresser's contrabass, Billy Mintz's drumset and Zeena Parkins' harp. The result is at times gentler, though no less creative, than his more electrified endeavors".

== Track listing ==
All compositions by Nels Cline

1. "New Old Hat" - 7:04
2. "Spider Wisdom" - 5:54
3. "Circular" - 1:31
4. "Sunken Song" - 6:46
5. "Shale Bed" - 1:41
6. "Alstromeria" - 15:10
7. "Moth Song" - 4:49
8. "Cork Farm" - 2:56
9. "Queen of Angels" - 13:06
10. "Lullaby for Ian" - 5:59

== Personnel ==
- Nels Cline – acoustic guitar, electric guitar
- Mark Dresser - contrabass
- Billy Mintz - drum set
- Zeena Parkins - harp, electric harp (tracks 2, 3, 5, 6 & 8-10)
