= Currents, Constellations =

Studio album by The Nels Cline 4
- Released: April 13, 2018
- Recorded: May and October, 2017
- Studio: Strange Weather, Brooklyn, NY and Studio G, Brooklyn, NY
- Genre: Rock, jazz
- Length: 44:06
- Label: Blue Note

Nels Cline chronology
Lovers (2016)	Currents, Constellations (2018)

Currents, Constellations is an album by The Nels Cline 4 that was released in April 2018 by the Blue Note label.

== Reception ==
Professional ratings
Review scores
Source	Rating
Allmusic	4/5 stars
All About Jazz	4/5 stars
All About Jazz	4/5 stars

The Allmusic review by Thom Jurek stated "In the aftermath of 2014's highly regarded Room, the acoustic encounter between guitarists Nels Cline and Julian Lage, both men speculated on what adding a rhythm section might sound like ... Currents, Constellations is virtually free of excess. Instead, it delivers a panoramic approach to group interaction with abundant dynamic and harmonic variety. From jazz to rock to improv, this set is a remarkable illustration of the question Cline and Lage posed about what they would sound like with a rhythm section. Damn fine is the answer".

On All About Jazz, Mike Jurkovic said "the pointillist, textured music found on Currents, Constellations comes as no surprise and great welcome. He and Lage simply play as if of one mind, unglued from any preconceived notions or tight-ass dogma". On the same site Mark Sullivan noted " the presence of a rhythm section lends an energy and a more extroverted sound ... The band seems to have inspired Cline the composer; the tunes are striking, some of his most memorable ... Currents, Constellations is a considerable departure from Cline's 2016 Blue Note debut album, Lovers, with its romantic large ensemble. This is a great new band, and a pointed demonstration of Cline's composing and playing".

In DownBeat, Dave Cantor observed "there’s a balance struck between some of the album’s relatively conventional moments and Cline’s clear affinity for avant-garde twists and turns". In JazzTimes, Mike Joyce wrote "fellow guitarists will marvel at the level of interplay demonstrated here ... Cline never seems at a loss for ideas when it comes time to introduce contrasting tones, textures and dynamics, or deploy whimsical effects".

== Track listing ==
All compositions by Nels Cline except where noted

1. "Furtive" – 4:53
2. "Swing Ghost '59" – 5:01
3. "Imperfect 10" – 4:23
4. "As Close as That" – 6:22
5. "Amenette" – 5:31
6. "Temporarily" (Carla Bley) – 5:33
7. "River Mouth (Parts 1 & 2)" – 9:32
8. "For Each, a Flower" – 2:51

== Personnel ==
- Nels Cline – electric guitar, acoustic guitar
- Julian Lage – electric guitar
- Scott Colley – bass
- Tom Rainey – drums
