= Sad (album) =

Studio album by Nels Cline Trio
- Released: April 1998
- Recorded: April – August 1997
- Genre: Free jazz, jazz-rock, noise
- Length: 67:25
- Label: Little Brother Records
- Producer: Nels Cline Trio; Mike Hogan

Nels Cline Trio chronology
Chest (1996)	Sad (1998)	Hold It Under a Faucet 7" (2002)

Sad is an album by Nels Cline Trio. His fourth release, it was recorded at New Zone Studio by Wayne Peet and released in 1998 by Little Brother Records.

== Track listing ==
1. "Anthony (In Memory of Tony Williams)"
2. "Fluff With Fork"
3. "The Luxury of Silk (for Lynn Johnston)"
4. "Little Shaver"
5. "Arrows (for Carla Bozulich)"
6. "Texas Telephone Pal"
7. "Where Is Your Woman? (In Memory of Laura Nyro)"
8. "In Form (for Carole Kim)"
9. "Thought Cloud"
10. "Crest In Black (for Rincy and Her Drums)"

== Personnel ==
- Nels Cline - Guitars, Voice (#2)
- Bob Mair - Bass, Guitar (#6)
- Michael Preussner - Drum Set, Organ (#6, #9)
- Noriko Peet - Voice (#3)
