= Eric Von Essen =

American jazz musician

Eric Von Essen (June 30, 1954 – August 14, 1997) was an American jazz bassist, pianist, and composer active on the West Coast jazz scene of the 1970s, 80s, and 90s.

Von Essen played in the Young Musicians Foundation Debut Orchestra in 1978, where he met Jeff Gauthier and began working with him. Together with twin brothers Alex and Nels Cline, the four formed an ensemble called Quartet Music, which played together until 1990. While working with Quartet Music, Essen studied tablas in India.

In 1989, Quartet Music was commissioned by the Milwaukee Symphony to write music for a performance. Von Essen wrote "Prayer for James Pt. 1 and Pt. 2" and orchestrated three of the group's existing pieces to fulfill the commission.

In 1992, Von Essen became the bassist of the Lighthouse All-Stars at the Lighthouse Cafe in Hermosa Beach, alongside Shorty Rogers and Bud Shank; he replaced Monty Budwig as the group's bassist. Among the other musicians Von Essen played with are Frank Morgan, Jimmy Rowles, Vinny Golia, Billy Childs, and Mike Campbell. He directed the Jazz Tap Ensemble for seven years.

In the mid-1990s Von Essen relocated to Sweden to instruct at Sverigefinska Folkhögskola Jazz music department there. He died in 1997.

In 2000, Cryptogramophone Records released a tribute album, The Music of Eric Von Essen, Vol. 1 which consisted of Von Essen's compositions performed by others. Cryptogramophone released two additional volumes in 2001 and 2002.

== Discography ==
With Alex Cline

- The Lamp and the Star (ECM, 1989)

With Art Farmer

- Central Avenue Reunion (Contemporary, 1990)

with Lou Levy, Pete Christleib, and Ralph Penland on LUNARCY (Verve, 1993)
