= Lovers (Nels Cline album) =

Studio album by Nels Cline
- Released: August 9, 2016
- Recorded: November / December 2013
- Genre: Jazz
- Length: 89:15
- Label: Blue Note
- Producer: David Breskin

Nels Cline chronology
Accidental Sky (2015)	Lovers (2016)	Currents, Constellations (2018)

Lovers is an album by guitarist Nels Cline which was released in August 2016 on the Blue Note label. Cline stated " I hope Lovers offers something of an update of the 'mood music' idea and ideal, while celebrating and challenging our iconic notion of romance".

== Reception ==
Professional ratings
Aggregate scores
Source	Rating
Metacritic	84/100
Review scores
Source	Rating
AllMusic	4/5 stars
All About Jazz	4.5/5 stars
Blurt	4/5 stars
Consequence of Sound	B
Exclaim!	8/10
The Independent	4/5 stars
Pitchfork	7.6/10
PopMatters	9/10
Rolling Stone	3.5/5 stars
Uncut	9/10

In Rolling Stone Will Hermes wrote "An update of Fifties "mood music", this chilled-out instrumental soundtracks for breakfast in bed with mai-tais and late-night booty calls, Lovers is a departure for Wilco guitar swami Nels Cline, whose side projects generally involve free-jazz freakouts. That's not to say that this wordless double-disc set, featuring an all-star orchestra full of sharp improvisers, isn't wildly inventive in its water-colored way". Pitchfork's Seth Colter Walls rated the album 7.6 out of 10, saying, "Cline has delivered a chamber-orchestra set that’s notable for relying on some “Great American Songbook” standards by the likes of Jerome Kern and Rodgers & Hammerstein... The only task he doesn’t quite pull off is the composition of original themes that stand with the classics he’s selected. Almost half of the first CD is made up of Cline originals, and these pale a bit in comparison with the surrounding material. Though thanks to its sly and measured embrace of the experimental, Lovers still has all the originality it needs to endear". Blurt correspondent Adolph Alzuphar noted: "Nels Cline’s Blue Note debut Lovers is a musical bonanza: guitar, the lyrical and the experimental. And it’s monumental when the album’s band lets loose". AllMusic reviewer Thom Jurek stated "Due to its extensive length and low-key demeanor, Lovers is demanding. That said, Cline's harmonic, textural, and timbral palettes deliver it as a compellingly engaging and original take on orchestral -- and by intent, conceptual -- jazz. He hears possibilities in the historical past and articulates them with timeless ardor. This may be Cline's quietest recording, but it is one of his finest". They also selected it as one of their Favorite Jazz Albums of 2016.

== Track listing ==
All compositions by Nels Cline except where noted.

=== Disc one ===
1. "Introduction/Diaphanous" - 4:21
2. "Glad to Be Unhappy" (Richard Rodgers, Lorenz Hart) - 4:08
3. "Beautiful Love" (Wayne King, Victor Young, Egbert Van Alstyne, Haven Gillespie) - 3:59
4. "Hairpin & Hatbox" - 3:32
5. "Cry, Want" (Jimmy Giuffre) - 6:54
6. "Lady Gabor" (Gábor Szabó) - 8:27
7. "The Bed We Made" - 3:25
8. "You Noticed" - 4:01
9. "Secret Love" (Sammy Fain, Paul Francis Webster) - 4:30
10. "I Have Dreamed" (Rodgers, Oscar Hammerstein II) - 2:39

=== Disc two ===
1. "Why Was I Born?" (Jerome Kern, Hammerstein) - 5:02
2. "Invitation" (Bronisław Kaper, Webster) - 2:26
3. "It Only Has to Happen Once" (Arto Lindsay, Peter Scherer) - 5:45
4. "The Night Porter/Max, Mon Amour" (Daniele Paris/Michel Portal) - 8:14
5. "Snare, Girl" (Sonic Youth) - 6:35
6. "So Hard It Hurts/Touching" (Annette Peacock) - 6:54
7. "The Search for Cat" (Henry Mancini) - 2:34
8. "The Bond" - 5:49

== Personnel ==
- Nels Cline – electric and acoustic guitars, lap steel, effects
- Michael Leonhart - trumpet, flugelhorn, cymbalon, celeste, arranger, conductor
- Devin Hoff - contrabass, bass guitar
- Alex Cline - drumset, percussion
- Steven Bernstein - trumpet, slide trumpet, flugelhorn, alto horn
- Taylor Haskins - trumpet, flugelhorn, valve trombone
- Alan Ferber - trombone, bass trombone
- Charles Pillow - C, alto, & bass flutes, oboe, English horn, alto saxophone, Bb clarinet
- J. D. Parran - C, alto, & bass flutes, Bb clarinet, alto clarinet, baritone & bass saxophones
- Ben Goldberg - contra-alto clarinet, Bb clarinet
- Douglas Wieselman - bass clarinet, Bb clarinet, tenor saxophone
- Gavin Templeton - Bb clarinet, alto saxophone
- Sara Schoenbeck - bassoon
- Julian Lage - acoustic and electric guitars
- Kenny Wollesen - vibraphone, marimba, percussion
- Zeena Parkins - harp
- Yuka Honda - celeste, Juno 60
- Antoine Silverman - violin
- Jeff Gauthier - violin
- Amy Kimball - viola, violin
- Stephanie Griffin - viola
- Erik Friedlander - cello
- Maggie Parkins - cello
