= Consentrik Quartet =

Studio album by Nels Cline
- Released: March 14, 2025
- Recorded: February and July 2024
- Studio: The Bunker (Brooklyn)
- Length: 67:39
- Label: Blue Note
- Producer: Nels Cline

Nels Cline chronology
Share the Wealth (2020)	Consentrik Quartet (2025)

Singles from Consentrik Quartet
- 1. "The 23" Released: January 16, 2025

Consentrik Quartet is a studio album by American composer Nels Cline. It was released on March 14, 2025, by Blue Note Records. The fourth release by Cline on Blue Note, it was performed with his ensemble of the same name, featuring German jazz saxophonist Ingrid Laubrock, American drummer Tom Rainey, and double-bassist Chris Lightcap.

== Background ==
Consisting of twelve songs ranging between four and five minutes each with the exception of "Satomi", which is over nine minutes long, the album's runtime exceeds an hour and seven minutes. Describing the title, Cline noted it as the word "concentric" with a "k at the end" in Middle English, and included the word "consent".

Cline first performed with the ensemble before the COVID-19 pandemic at an event in Brooklyn by John Zorn, and started to create material for the album during the lockdowns. The album's lead single, "The 23", was released on January 16, 2025.

== Reception ==
Professional ratings
Review scores
Source	Rating
AllMusic	4/5 stars
Pitchfork	7.3/10
PopMatters	8/10 stars

AllMusic remarked that "Consentrik Quartet is a bracing statement by this wonderful group and a future-forward approach to jazz, bursting with ideas and near symbiotic ensemble play." Pitchfork stated "Consentrik explore inside and beyond their collective past, moving from dreamy ballads to scrambled bedlam to boisterous grooves and back in a little more than an hour." JazzTimes wrote that "With some of the music closer to through-written chamber pieces and others full of improvisation, Consentrik Quartet builds on Cline’s hard-to-define track record."

PopMatters rated the album eight out of ten, stating "With Consentrik Quartet, there’s something for everyone, although it leans heavily toward hard bop – a genre perfected by the Blue Note label on which the record appears." BrooklynVegan commented "the album sounds more rooted in the organic sounds of the mid-to-late ’60s post-bop era compared to some of the more overtly modern fusions on the last Nels Cline Singers album."

== Track listing ==
All tracks are written by Nels Cline.

Consentrik Quartet track listing
No.	Title	Length
1.	"The Returning Angel"	5:20
2.	"The 23"	5:15
3.	"Surplus"	5:16
4.	"Slipping into Something"	5:03
5.	"Allende"	6:10
6.	"House of Steam"	5:52
7.	"Inner Wall"	5:15
8.	"Satomi"	9:39
9.	"The Bag"	4:59
10.	"Down Close"	4:13
11.	"Question Marks (The Spot)"	5:19
12.	"Time of No Sirens"	5:18
Total length:		67:39

== Personnel ==
- Nels Cline – electric guitars, acoustic guitars, effects, production, additional mixing
- Chris Lightcap – acoustic bass, effects
- Ingrid Laubrock – tenor saxophones, soprano saxophones
- Tom Rainey – drums
- Eli Crews – mixing, recording
- Thomas Dimuzio – mastering
- Nolan Thies – recording assistance
- Alex Conroy – recording assistance
- Hiroki Katayama – cover painting (Magata Jinja)
- Todd Gallopo – package design
- Nathan West – photography

== Charts ==
Chart performance for Consentrik Quartet
Chart (2025)	Peak position
UK Jazz & Blues Albums (OCC)	25
