= Destroy All Nels Cline =

2001 album by Nels Cline

Studio album by Nels Cline
- Released: April 21, 2001
- Recorded: July 1 & 2, 2000; Track House, Van Nuys, CA
- Genre: Jazz
- Length: 75:44
- Label: Atavistic; ALP122CD
- Producer: Wayne Peet

Nels Cline chronology
The Inkling (2000)	Destroy All Nels Cline (2001)	Instrumentals (2002)

Destroy All Nels Cline is an album by American guitarist Nels Cline which was released in April 2001 on the Atavistic label.

== Reception ==
Professional ratings
Review scores
Source	Rating
AllMusic	3/5 stars
All About Jazz	(favorable)
The Penguin Guide to Jazz Recordings	3/4 stars

The AllMusic review by Don Snowden states, "You won't hear Nels Cline individually to his best advantage here because the music is so dense and detail-packed it's hard to tell the soloists and the players apart. Which just may be the reason he wanted to do the project and name the disc Destroy All Nels Cline -- to escape from any personality focus, and get back to collective music making. It's tough stuff, but if you like seriously electric guitar improvisation and/or Sonic Youth and their ilk's more experimental forays, there are plenty of rewards here". All About Jazz stated "Take it or leave it. Destroy All Nels Cline offers surprisingly effective sonic therapy for the open-minded—and probably only a bad headache for the rest. You'll have to decide if it's going to work for you. This pair of ears gives it two thumbs up".

== Track listing ==
All compositions by Nels Cline

1. "Spider Wisdom" - 7:32
2. "Chi Cacoan" - 6:28
3. "The Ringing Hand" - 9:10
4. "Talk of Chocolate Bed" - 9:58
5. "After Armenia" - 5:59
6. "Progression" - 4:56
7. "As in Life (In Memory Of Horace Tapscott)" - 14:42
8. "Friends of Snowman" - 4:38
9. "Martyr" - 12:21

== Personnel ==
- Nels Cline – electric guitars
- G. E. Stinson, Woodward Lee Aplanalp - electric guitar
- Carla Bozulich - electric guitar, sampling keyboard
- Bob Mair - electric bass guitar, electric guitar
- Zeena Parkins - electric harp
- Wayne Peet - clarinet, mellotron
- Alex Cline - drums, percussion
