= Gregg Bendian =

American jazz musician

- Born: July 13, 1963 (age 62); Englewood, New Jersey, U.S.
- Genres: Jazz, jazz fusion, free jazz
- Instruments: Drums, piano

Gregg Bendian (born July 13, 1963) is an American jazz drummer, percussionist, pianist, and composer.

== Early life ==
Born in Englewood, New Jersey, Bendian was raised in Fairview and Teaneck. Bendian began playing drums at the age of nine and studied under Gary Van Dyke of the New Jersey Percussion Ensemble. In high school, he began composing chamber music and studied with Noel DaCosta, Andrew Cyrille and Steve McCall.

== Career ==
Bendian has played and recorded with Nels Cline, Pat Metheny, Derek Bailey, Peter Brötzmann, Steve Hunt, Gary Lucas and Cecil Taylor amongst others. Albums recorded under his own name and that of his group Interzone, incorporate elements of fusion and free jazz.

Bendian is fond of recording tributes. With Interzone, he recorded Requiem for Jack Kirby, a tribute to the comic book artist. He has also recorded tributes to Octavia Butler and others. In 1999, he and Nels Cline released Interstellar Space Revisited, a critically acclaimed cover album of John Coltrane's Interstellar Space, which Bendian described as "my love letter to Free Jazz drumming". The Penguin Guide to Jazz on CD said, "Hard to listen to this contemporary pairing without returning to the source material. Hard to revisit that without wanting to hear Bendian and Cline again."

In 2000, he collaborated with violinist Jeff Gauthier, bassist Steuart Liebig, and guitarist G. E. Stinson on an album of collective improvisational pieces recorded live in the studio, entitled Bone Structure. Released in 2003, it was given four stars by Jon Andrews in DownBeat magazine.

2024: Teaches Drum Tech and Drum Lessons at William Paterson University
