= Draw Breath =

Studio album by The Nels Cline Singers
- Released: June 26, 2007
- Recorded: January 7–February 24, 2007
- Genres: West Coast Jazz, jazz-rock, avant-garde
- Length: 73:30
- Label: Cryptogramophone
- Producer: The Nels Cline Singers

The Nels Cline Singers chronology
The Giant Pin (2004)	Draw Breath (2007)	The Celestial Septet (2008)

Professional ratings
Review scores
Source	Rating
AllMusic	4/5 stars
The Penguin Guide to Jazz Recordings	3.5/4 stars

Draw Breath is the third album released by The Nels Cline Singers in 2007. It featured both abrasive musical textures and gentler compositions such as "Caved-In Heart Blues" and "The Angel of Angels," the latter of which The New York Times called one of the prettiest works of Nels Cline's career.

== Track listing ==
All tracks by Nels Cline

1. "Caved-In Heart Blues" - 6:52
2. "Attempted" - 8:50
3. "Confection" - 4:17
4. "An Evening at Pops'" - 16:03
5. "The Angel of Angels" - 6:21
6. "Recognize I" - 4:09
7. "Mixed Message" - 14:58
8. "Recognize II" - 3:41
9. "Squirrel of God" - 8:19

== Personnel ==
- Devra Hoff - contrabass
- Scott Amendola - drums, percussion, "Live" Electronics, effects
- Nels Cline - Electric guitar, acoustic guitar, effects
- Glenn Kotche - percussion, crotales, glockenspiel on track #9
