= Dirty Baby =

Studio album by Nels Cline
- Released: October 12, 2010
- Recorded: January 24–26, 2008
- Genre: Jazz
- Length: 93:15
- Labels: Cryptogramophone; CG142
- Producer: David Breskin

Nels Cline chronology
Coward (2009)	Dirty Baby (2010)	Initiate (2010)

Dirty Baby (stylized as DIRTY BABY) is an album by American guitarist Nels Cline performing compositions inspired by Edward Ruscha, which was released in October 2010 on the Cryptogramophone label.

Dirty Baby is also the name of a multi-media book of Cline's music, paintings by Ruscha, and the poetry of David Breskin, also released in 2010. It features sixty-six paintings by Ruscha, Cline's original music, and poems by Breskin that employ the ancient Arabic poetic form of the ghazal.

== Reception ==
Professional ratings
Aggregate scores
Source	Rating
Metacritic	74/100
Review scores
Source	Rating
Allmusic	4/5 stars
All About Jazz	3.5/5 stars
The Guardian	3/5 stars
Rolling Stone	3.5/5 stars
PopMatters	8/10
DownBeat	4.5/5 stars

Dirty Baby received mainly positive reviews on release. At Metacritic, which assigns a normalised rating out of 100 to reviews from mainstream critics, the album has received a score of 74, based on 6 reviews which is categorised as generally favorable. The Allmusic review by Thom Jurek awarded the album 4 stars out of 5, stating "Dirty Baby is a singular accomplishment, presented in a fashion that demands more of the listener's attention but buy pays off handsomely. It adds immeasurably to the depth of Cline's contributions as a musician -- and offers another way of seeing and hearing this body of Ruscha's work". Writing for All About Jazz, Mark Corroto stated "Cline and his collaborators perform an encyclopedic array of styles and forms, the pieces clocking in from a half minute to three-and-a-half to explore noise, rock, free jazz and chamber classical, much like the work of John Zorn". The Guardian's John Fordham rated the album 3 stars out of 5, saying, "Nels Cline has been an uncategorisable innovator for two decades, and certainly remains one". Rolling Stone's Will Hermes rated the album 3½ stars out of 5, noting "Overall, it's less about abstract guitar heroics than his usual projects. But hearing Cline get freaky with such a wide palette and such a sharp ensemble (including twin brother Alex on drums) is a new shade of thrill". PopMatters' John Garratt stated "the eclecticism of Dirty Baby makes for such a strong listening experience. You will be more fascinated than bewildered (though I can’t rule the latter word out for some listeners)". DownBeat reviewer John Ephland gave the album 4.5 stars. Ephland wrote, "All in all, Dirty Baby is riotous fun, an orgy of sound, design and (mostly) muted color. For music fans, it’s another excuse to enjoy all things Nels eclectic, from Duke Ellington to Air to Morton Feldman, an artsy-fartsy, John Zorn-y, bombastic and pretty much pastiche-oriented, other-worldly take on this Land of the Free and Home of the Brave". JazzTimes reviewer Michael J West praised the album stating it "is exceptional work: easily digested experimental music that shows Cline’s stylistic skill, imagination and boldness".

== Track listing ==
All compositions by Nels Cline

Disc One:

1. "Part I" - 4:11
2. "Part II" - 3:38
3. "Part III" - 7:13
4. "1-4 Part IV" - 3:31
5. "Part V" - 10:52
6. "Part VI" - 12:38

Disc Two:

1. "In God We Trust" - 1:40
2. "Hi There, My Old Friend" - 1:31
3. "If I Was You I'd Do Just Like I Tell You To Do" - 1:16
4. "Do As I Say or..." - 1:14
5. "No Mercy" - 1:49
6. "Do As Told or Suffer" - 1:16
7. "Agree To Our Terms or Prepare Yourself For a Blast Furnace" - 0:55
8. "Your a Dead Man" - 3:14
9. "Hey You Want To Sleep With the Fishes?" - 1:22
10. "A Columbian Necklace For You" - 0:43
11. "Note We Have Already Got Rid of Several Like You - One Was Found In River Just Recently" - 1:22
12. "Be Cautious Else We Be Bangin On You" - 3:34
13. "You Won't Know When You Won't Know Where You Won't Know Who and You Won't Know Why" - 1:27
14. "It's Payback Time" - 2:13
15. "I'm Going To Leave More Notes and I'm Going To Kick More Ass" - 0:47
16. "You Cross Me I Wanna See Blood" - 2:02
17. "I Heard You Moved To Pahrump, Nevada You Cannot Escape" - 1:14
18. "Little Snitches Like You Endup in Dumpsters All Across Town" - 0:59
19. "I'll Be Getting Out Soon and I Haven't Forgotten Your Testimony Put Me In Here" - 2:37
20. "You Talk You Get Killed" - 2:05
21. "Do Not Let the Information Be Known To Any Person or You Die" - 1:25
22. "Don't Threaten Me With Your Threats" - 2:31
23. "I Just Might Act Ugly If You Talk" - 0:53
24. "When I'm Released I'm Smoking a Straight Line To You: Got Me?" - 1:18
25. "Want To Get To Know My Boiling Point?" - 0:38
26. "You Dirty Rotten Bitch" - 0:43
27. "You Will Eat Hot Lead" - 1:16
28. "I Can't Take It No More" - 0:28
29. "I Might Just Act Ugly If You Get Up on That Stand and Say Something Unpleasant to My Ears" - 0:41
30. "I Thought I Told You That We Won't Stop" - 2:01
31. "I Will Wipe You Off the Face of This Earth" - 1:01
32. "Give Up the Gold or Give Up Your Life" - 2:21
33. "You and I Are In Disagreement" - 1:35

== Personnel ==
- Nels Cline – electric guitar, acoustic guitar, cigarbox guitar, lap steel guitar, effects, loops, megamouth, quintronics drum buddy
- Bill Barrett - chromatic harmonica
- Wayne Peet - organ
- Jon Brion - electric piano, EMS synthi, voice
- Jeremy Drake - guitars, string instrument
- Glenn Taylor - pedal steel guitar
- Scott Amendola - drum set, percussion, loops/electronics
- Devin Hoff - contrabass, bass guitar
- Danny Frankel - percussion, ½ drum set
- Vinny Golia - flute, clarinet, saxophones
- Dan Clucas - trumpet, flute
- Jeff Gauthier - violin
- Jessica Catron - cello
- Brad Dutz - xylophone, vibraphone, frame drum, bongos
- Alex Cline - percussion

== In other media ==
The Dirty Baby multi-media book was published by Delmonico Books/Prestel Publishing in 2010. It features sixty-six paintings by Ruscha, Cline's original music, and poems by Breskin that employ the ancient Arabic poetic form of the ghazal. The book consists of two parts or "sides": side A describes the rise of human civilization, and side B provides an account, in a variety of voices, of the second Iraq War. The book includes four CDs, two featuring Cline's music and two of spoken-voice poetry.
