= Cryptogramophone Records =

- Founded: 1998
- Founder: Jeff Gauthier
- Genre: Jazz
- Country of origin: U.S.
- Location: Los Angeles
- Official website: www.cryptogramophone.org

Cryptogramophone Records is a jazz record label formed in 1998 by violinist Jeff Gauthier to document the music of his friend, Eric von Essen.

Cryptogramophone has released albums by such West Coast musicians as guitarist Nels Cline, drummer Alex Cline, bassists Darek Oles and Steuart Liebig, drummer Scott Amendola, guitarist G. E. Stinson, trombonist Scot Ray, pianist Don Preston and Gauthier himself. In addition, Cryptogramophone has recorded New York City musicians Mark Dresser and Erik Friedlander.

As of November 2026, the label has renamed itself "Gramophonic Records".

== Discography ==
Cat. #	Artist	Title	Year of Release	Comments
CG101	Jeanette Wrate & the Northern Lights Ensemble	Echoes of a Northern Sky	1999	
CG102	Alex Cline Ensemble	Sparks Fly Upward	1999	
CG103	Various Artists	The Music of Eric von Essen I	2000	
CG104	Mark Dresser & Frances-Marie Uitti	Sonomondo	2000	
CG105	Nels Cline	The Inkling	2000	
CG106	Alex Cline, Jeff Gauthier & G. E. Stinson	The Other Shore	2000	
CG107	Don Preston	Transformation	2001	
CG108	Various Artists	The Music of Eric von Essen II	2001	
CG109	Steuart Liebig	Pomegranate	2001	
CG110	Alex Cline Ensemble	The Constant Flame	2001	
CG111	Mark Dresser Trio	Aquifer	2002	
CG112	Jeff Gauthier Goatette	Mask	2002	
CG113	The Nels Cline Singers	Instrumentals	2002	
CG114	Gregg Bendian, Jeff Gauthier, Steaurt Liebig, G. E. Stinson	Bone Structure	2003	
CG115	Various Artists	The Music of Eric von Essen III	2003	
CG116	Scott Amendola Band	Cry	2003	
CG117	Scot Ray	Active Vapor Recovery	2003	
CG118	Erik Friedlander	Quake	2003	
CG119	Darek Oleszkiewicz	Like a Dream	2004	
CG120	The Nels Cline Singers	The Giant Pin	2004	
CG121	Alex Cline, Kaoru, Miya Masaoka & G. E. Stinson	Cloud Plate	2005	
CG122	Alan Pasqua	My New Old Friend	2005	
CG123	Scott Amendola Band	Believe	2005	
CG124	Mark Dresser & Denman Maroney	Time Changes	2005	
CG125	Jenny Scheinman	12 Songs	2005	
CG126	Ben Goldberg	The Door, the Hat, the Chair, the Fact	2006	
CG127	Erik Friedlander	Prowl	2006	
CG128	Jeff Gauthier Goatette	One and the Same	2006	
CG129	Bennie Maupin Ensemble	Penumbra	2006	
CG130	Nels Cline	New Monastery	2006	
CG131	Myra Melford	The Image of Your Body	2006	
CG132	David Witham	Spinning the Circle	2007	
CG133	The Nels Cline Singers	Draw Breath	2007	
CG134	Trio M	Big Picture	2007	
CG135	Alan Pasqua	The Antisocial Club	2007	
CG136	Various Artists	Cryptogramophone Assemblage 1998-2008: A Ten-Year Retrospective	2008	Double CD & DVD
CG137	Bennie Maupin Quintet	Early Reflections	2008	
CG138	Todd Sickafoose	Tiny Resistors	2008	
CG139	Jeff Gauthier Goatette	House of Return	2008	
CG140	Alex Cline	Continuation	2009	
CG141	Nels Cline	Coward	2009	
CG142	Nels Cline	Dirty Baby	2010	Double CD
CG143	The Nels Cline Singers	Initiate	2010	Double CD - Studio and Live Recordings
CG144	BB&C (Tim Berne, Jim Black & Nels Cline)	The Veil	2011	Recorded live at The Stone
CG145	Jeff Gauthier Goatette	Open Source	2011	
CG146	Alex Cline	For People In Sorrow	2013	Live CD & DVD
CG147	The Adorables	The Adorables	2013	
CG148	Alex Cline	Oceans of Vows	2015	
CG149	Jeff Gauthier and Maggie Parkins	The Smudges: Song and Call	2022	

== See also ==
- List of record labels
