= Steuart Liebig =

American musician

Steuart Liebig, born July 25, 1956, is an American bassist and composer of modern creative jazz and the free improvisational music. He plays 6-string bass guitars.

== Life and work ==
Liebig grew up in Los Angeles and was influenced as a child by rock and blues music of the 1960s. He first started playing jazz in highschool. He started experimenting with different sounds in college and between 1974 and 1976 he belonged to John Beasley's band. At the age of 19, he played rhythm guitar for the soul jazz pianist and singer Les McCann, with whom he worked on 4 albums. In 1979 he left McCann's band to attend California State University, where he studied classic double bass, music history, and composition until 1983. After he graduated, he created the fusion band, BLOC, with Nels Cline. He also played with Julius Hemphill's JAH-Band along with Alex Cline and Bill Frisell. He spent a lot of time playing with musicians in Los Angeles that were interested in freely improvised music. Afterwards, he busied himself with his own classical compositions.

After the breakup of the BLOC in 1991, he played one tour with Michael Penn, but then decided to focus on improvised music and composition. He formed the group, Quartetto Stig, with violin, trumpet, drum s and contrabass guitar (6-string electric bass). With this group, his compositions began to come to life. Additionally, they recorded three albums, 1993 Hommages Obliques, 1995 Lingua Oscura, and 1997 Pienso Oculto, through Vinny Golia's Nine Wind Records.

Afterwards he disbanded Quartetto Stig and worked on the creation of Stigtette (flute, clarinet, trombone, and contrabass guitar) and The Mentones (alto saxophone, harmonica, drums, and contrabass guitar), the worked on music from American folk blues, but in the language of free jazz. Additionally, he created a trio including himself, Vinny Golia, and drummer Billy Mintz. With this trio he worked on two albums for Candence Jazz Records, No Train 1999 and Antipodes 2001.

In 1999, he worked with percussionist Gregg Bendian and Nels Cline on Myriad. In 2001, he worked on a longer composition titled Pomegranate for his third stream band, Kammerstig, that was influenced by Igor Stravinsky. On the same album, he played with other musicians such as Nels Cline, Mark Dresser, Jeff Gauthier, Vinny Golia, Ellen Burr, and Tom Varner. After 2000, the following albums emerged: The Mentones' Locustland and Nowhere Calling, Minim's Quicksilver, Stigtette's Delta, as well as the kelpland Serenades with Anna Homler, and the album On the Cusp of Fire and Water with Vinny Golia and Michael Vatcher. In 2000, he collaborated with Gregg Bendian, Jeff Gauthier, and G.E. Stinson on the album, Bone Structure, released in 2003. Recorded live in the studio, it was a collection of twelve 'songs' showcasing collective improvisation that DownBeat magazine gave four stars.

Aside from his ensemble work, he also wrote music for improvised chamber ensembles, including for: The Meninas Quartet (2005–2006), Second Practicca Quintet (2000–2005), for the electric jazz band Lane Ends Merge Left (1997–2005), a few pieces for solo contrabass guitar, some longer pieces for his ensemble Kammerstig, as well as for Panharmonicon (2005–2006). In 2006, Liebig worked with guitarist G. E Stinson and the Tee-Tot Quartet by Joseph Berardi (percussion), Dan Clucas (cornet), and Scot Ray (dobro). In 2008, he published the Tee-Tot Quartet's album, Always Outnumbered, which was a mix of blues, rock and roll, bop, swing, and free jazz music. The album was influenced by Charles Mingus, Robert Johnson, Louis Armstrong, Muddy Waters, and Skip James. In 2018 he released "Last Call" with Men-Tot Six (a combination of the Mentones and Tee-Tot Quartet), and Nomads with flutist/vocalist Emily Hay.

In 2005, he was named a bassist deserving wider recognition in the DownBeat poll, and in 2008 he was nominated for the Alpert Awards in the Arts.
