= Alex Cline =

American jazz drummer (born 1956)

- Born: January 4, 1956 (age 70); Los Angeles, California
- Genres: Jazz
- Occupation: Musician
- Instrument: Drums
- Years active: 1980s–present
- Labels: Nine Winds, Cryptogramophone

Alex Cline (born January 4, 1956) is an American jazz drummer.

== Biography ==
Born in Los Angeles, California, Cline began playing drums with his twin brother, guitarist Nels Cline, at the age of 11. Their first band was called Homogenized Goo and included David Hirschman on guitar. Alex Cline began a musical association with woodwind artist Jamil Shabaka in 1976 as "Duo Infinity". In 1977, he became a member of Vinny Golia's group as well as the Julius Hemphill Trio (along with Baikida Carroll), formed the electric improvisational trio Spiral (with brother Nels and synthesizer player and multi-instrumentalist Brian Horner) and began performing solo percussion concerts.

In 1979, Alex and Nels Cline, along with bassist Eric von Essen and violinist Jeff Gauthier, formed "Quartet Music", a group that enjoyed continued success in its performances and four recordings over an eleven-year period and was awarded grants from the National Endowment for the Arts and the California Arts Council.

In 1982, Alex Cline made his solo debut with Not Alone (Nine Winds), a double LP of percussion music. In 1987, he recorded The Lamp and The Star (ECM), his first album as a bandleader-composer. As the leader of his own group, The Alex Cline Ensemble, he can be heard on Sparks Fly Upward and The Constant Flame, two releases on Cryptogramophone Records, an LA-based independent creative-jazz label. Cline's other improvisational collaborations include right of violet and The Other Shore, both with Jeff Gauthier and ex-Shadowfax guitarist G.E. Stinson, and Cloud Plate (Cryptogramophone) with Stinson, vocalist Kaoru and koto player Miya Masaoka.

Other groups Cline has led are Alex Cline's Band of the Moment and The Rain Trio (with Eric Barber and Scott Walton). He has also been involved in duo percussion collaborations with Ron George, Peter Erskine, Christopher Garcia, Andrea Centazzo, Gregg Bendian and Dan Morris, as well as involved in performing the works of composers such as Robert Eriksson, Harold Budd and David Means.

Cline has served as composer and/or performer for numerous modern dancers and dance companies in Los Angeles, including Margaret Schuette, Linda Fowler, the Momentum Company's "Soundspace" concerts, Dance/LA, the UCLA Dance Company and has enjoyed a longstanding involvement with Will Salmon's Open Gate Theatre company.

He has participated in performance collaborations with visual artists Yoshio Ikezaki, Norton Wisdom, Kio Griffith and 2-Tu. He has worked on feature and cable television film soundtracks, done numerous sound workshops and percussion clinics, plus lecture-demonstrations on Asian metal percussion instruments. Cline has also been the curator of the Open Gate Theatre's Sunday Evening Concerts series, a new music/creative jazz showcase held monthly in Eagle Rock, California (since 1997).

He also works as an interviewer/interview series developer-coordinator at the UCLA Library Center for Oral History Research.

Cline has worked with Gregg Bendian, Tim Berne, Arthur Blythe, Bobby Bradford, John Wolf Brennan, John Carter, Buddy Collette, Mark Dresser, Marty Ehrlich, Vinny Golia, Henry Grimes, Charlie Haden, Joseph Jarman, Henry Kaiser, Yusef Lateef, Charles Lloyd, Myra Melford, Frank Morgan, Don Preston, Elliott Sharp, and Wadada Leo Smith.

== Discography ==
=== As leader ===
- Duo Infinity with Jamil Shabaka (Aten, 1977)
- Not Alone (Nine Winds, 1981)
- The Lamp and the Star (ECM, 1989)
- Montsalvat (Nine Winds, 1995)
- Right of Violet with Jeff Gauthier, G.E. Stinson (Nine Winds, 1996)
- Espiritu with Gregg Bendian (Trumedia, 1998)
- Sparks Fly Upward (Cryptogramophone, 1999)
- The Other Shore with Jeff Gauthier, G.E. Stinson (Cryptogramophone, 2000)
- The Constant Flame (Cryptogramophone, 2001)
- Cloud Plate (Cryptogramophone, 2005)
- Continuation (Cryptogramophone, 2008)
- For People in Sorrow (Cryptogramophone, 2013)
- Dependent Origination (FMR, 2018)

With Quartet Music

- Quartet Music (Nine Winds, 1981)
- Ocean Park (Nine Winds, 1984)
- Window On the Lake (Nine Winds, 1986)
- Summer Night (Delos, 1989)

=== As sideman ===
With Gregg Bendian

- Gregg Bendian's Interzone (Eremite, 1996)
- Myriad (Atavistic, 2000)
- Requiem for Jack Kirby (Atavistic, 2001)

With Tim Berne

- The Five-Year Plan (Empire, 1979)
- 7X (Empire, 1980)
- Spectres (Empire, 1981)
- Fulton Street Maul (Columbia, 1987)

With John Wolf Brennan

- Shooting Stars & Traffic Lights (L+R/Bellaphon, 1995)
- I.N.I.T.I.A.L.S. (Creative Works, 2005)

With Nels Cline

- Angelica (Enja, 1988)
- Destroy All Nels Cline (Avavistic, 2000)
- New Monastery (Cryptogramophone, 2006)
- Dirty Baby (Cryptogramophone, 2010)
- Lovers (Blue Note, 2016)

With Jeff Gauthier

- Internal Memo (Nine Winds, 1994)
- The Present (Nine Winds, 1997)
- Mask (Cryptogramophone, 2002)
- One and the Same (Cryptogramophone, 2006)
- House of Return (Cryptogramophone, 2008)
- Open Source (Cryptogramophone, 2011)

With Vinny Golia

- Spirits in Fellowship (Nine Winds, 1977)
- In the Right Order... (Nine Winds, 1979)
- Openhearted (Nine Winds, 1979)
- The Gift of Fury (Nine Winds, 1981)
- Compositions for Large Ensemble (Nine Winds, 1982)
- Slice of Life (Nine Winds, 1983)
- Goin' Ahead (Nine Winds, 1985)
- Facts of Their Own Lives (Nine Winds, 1986)
- Out for Blood (Nine Winds, 1989)
- Pilgrimage to Obscurity (Nine Winds, 1990)
- Decennium Dans Axlan (Nine Winds, 1993)
- Commemoration (Nine Winds, 1994)
- Regards from Norma Desmond (Fresh Sound, 1994)
- Tutto Contare (Nine Winds, 1995)
- Portland 1996 (Nine Winds, 1997)
- Nation of Laws (Nine Winds, 1997)
- Lineage (Nine Winds, 1998)
- The Other Bridge (Nine Winds, 2000)
- One, Three, Two (Jazz'Halo, 2004)
- Sfumato (Clean Feed, 2005)
- Take Your Time (Relative Pitch, 2011)

With Richard Grossman

- One... Two... Three... Four... (Nine Winds, 1986)
- Trio in Real Time (Nine Winds, 1990)
- In the Air (Nine Winds, 1991)
- Remember (Magnatone, 1994)
- Even Your Ears (hatOLOGY, 1998)

With Ross Hammond

- Adored (Prescott, 2012)
- Cathedrals (Prescott, 2013)

With Armen Nalbandian

- Orbits (Blacksmith Brother, 2018)
- V (Blacksmith Brother, 2018)

With David Moss, Alex Cline, Andrea Centazzo

- Percussion Interchanges (Ictus, 1981)
- Koans: Vol. Two (Ictus, 2006)

With John Rapson

- Deeba Dah-Bwee (Nine Winds, 1984)
- Bu-Wah (Nine Winds, 1986)
- Bing (Sound Aspects, 1990)
- Dances & Orations (Music & Arts, 1996)

With others

- Bobby Bradford, Live at the Open Gate (NoBusiness, 2016)
- Andrea Centazzo, U.S.A. Concerts (Ictus, 1978)
- Amir ElSaffar, Radif Suite (Pi, 2010)
- Dennis Gonzalez, The Earth and the Heart (Konnex, 1991)
- Charlie Haden's Quartet West, In Angel City (Verve, 1988)
- Joel Harrison, 3 + 3 = 7 (Nine Winds, 1996)
- Julius Hemphill, Georgia Blue (Minor Music, 1984)
- Julius Hemphill, The Boyé Multi-National Crusade for Harmony (New World, 2021)
- Steuart Liebig, Pomegranate (Cryptogramophone, 2001)
- Lydia Lunch, Smoke in the Shadows (Breakin Beats, 2004)
- Don Preston, Transformation (Cryptogramophone, 2001)
- Adam Rudolph, Web of Light (Meta, 2002)
- G. E. Stinson, The Same Without You (Nine Winds, 1992)
- Walter Thompson, Stardate (Dane, 1980)
