= Nels Cline =

American guitarist and composer

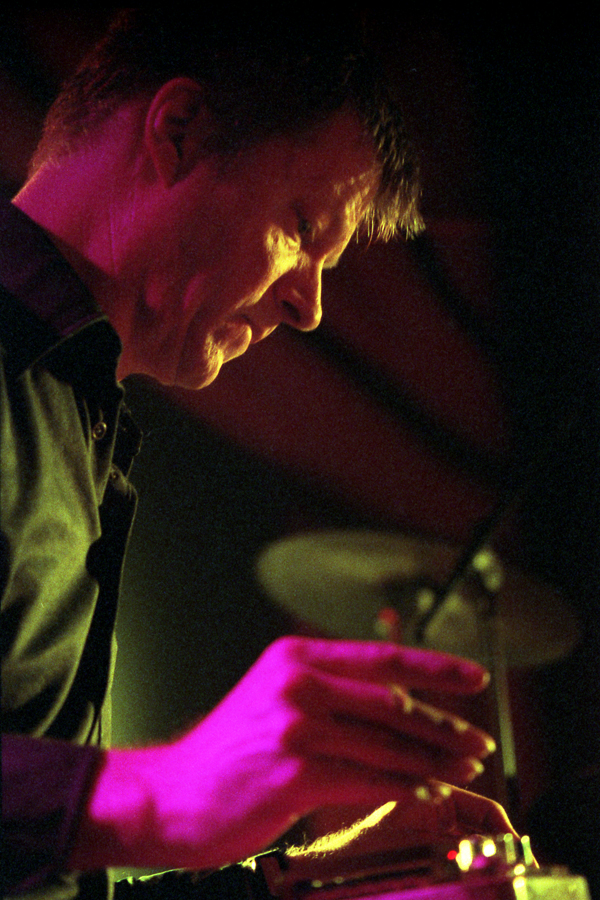
- Cline in 2004

Background information
- Born: Nels Courtney Cline; January 4, 1956 (age 70); Los Angeles, California, U.S.
- Genres: Free jazz, experimental, noise, punk rock, indie rock
- Occupation: Musician
- Instrument: Guitar
- Years active: 1977–present
- Labels: Cryptogramophone, Nine Winds, Atavistic, Enja, Little Brother, Strange Attractors, Audio House, Long Song, Mack Avenue, Blue Note
- Website: www.nelscline.com

Signature
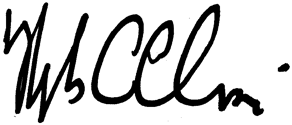

Nels Courtney Cline (born January 4, 1956) is an American guitarist and composer. He has been a guitarist for the band Wilco since 2004.

In the 1980s he played jazz, often in collaboration with his twin brother Alex, a percussionist. He has worked with musicians in punk and alternative rock such as Carla Bozulich and the Geraldine Fibbers, Mike Watt and Thurston Moore. He leads the Nels Cline Singers, Nels Cline Trio, and the Nels Cline 4.

Cline was named the 82nd greatest guitarist of all time by Rolling Stone magazine in November 2011.

== Career ==
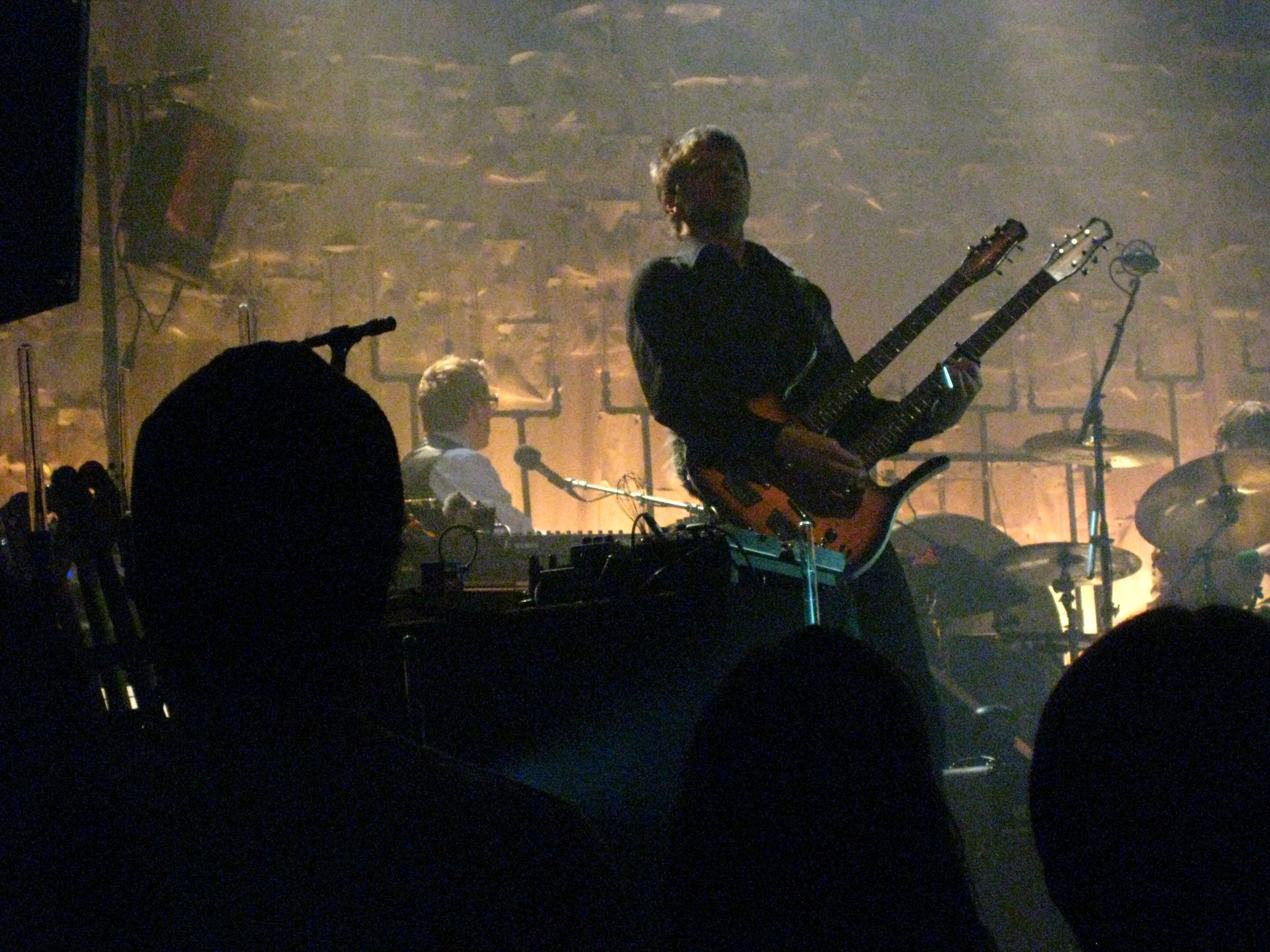
Cline playing a double-necked guitar with Wilco in 2010

Cline began to play guitar at age 12 when his twin brother Alex Cline started playing drums. The brothers developed together musically, playing in a rock band called Homogenized Goo. Both graduated from University High School. Cline cites hearing a recording of Jimi Hendrix performing "Manic Depression" as a defining moment in his decision to become a guitarist.

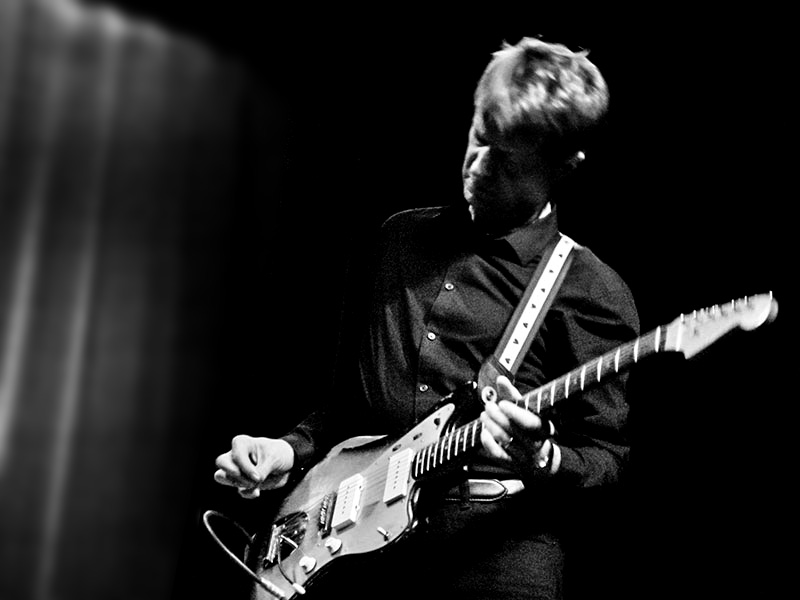
Cline in Aarhus Denmark 2014 playing with the BB&C Band

Cline has performed on over 150 albums in jazz, pop, rock, country, and experimental music. He was featured in a cover story by Guitar Player magazine for his work with the rock band Wilco.

== Personal life ==
Cline is married to Yuka Honda of Cibo Matto. Their wedding was in Honda's hometown in Japan in November 2010. They met through Mike Watt when he assembled the group Floored by Four. Cline joined Honda as a guest guitarist in the Yoko Ono Plastic Ono band for their tour in 2010. Cline joined Honda and her band Cibo Matto at the 2015 Solid Sound Festival.

== Discography ==
- Angelica (1988)
- The Inkling (2000)
- Destroy All Nels Cline (2001)
- New Monastery (2006)
- Coward (2009)
- Dirty Baby (2010)
- Lovers (2016)
- Currents, Constellations (2018)
- Consentrik Quartet (2025)
