= Administrative divisions of medieval Serbia =

Administrative divisions of medieval Serbia refer to territorial-administrative units of the medieval Serbian states. The fundamental territorial unit was the župa ("county"), made up of many villages and often named after a river. Several župe made up a zemlja ("land") in the Nemanjić period (1166–1371). Other territorial units were vlasti ("rule"), governed by generals, and krajište ("frontier").

== Early history ==
The Slavic settlement of the Balkans in the 6th- and 7th centuries destroyed the Eastern Roman (Byzantine) administrative apparatus in the Balkan provinces. According to the Royal Frankish Annals, written in 822, the Serbs "are said to hold a great/large part of Dalmatia". This means that the Serbs held a large part of the historical province of Dalmatia prior to the beginning of the 9th century. Other parts of Dalmatia were held by the Croats. The tribal names mentioned by De Administrando Imperio (DAI), that is Dokleans, Konavlians, Travunians, Zachumlians, and Narentines, were adopted following Slavic settlement, named after the environment, and were not original ethnic names, as opposed to that of the Serbs and Croats–which shows that the latter two were numerous and better organized, and absorbed lesser tribes. In the beginning, the župan was the representative of tribal leadership, and Byzantine sources speak of "elder župans". The DAI explains how among the South Slavs "Princes (archontas), as they say, these nations had non, but only zoupanous, elders (gerontas), as is the rule in the other Slavonic regions". With the establishment of Serbian states in the Early Middle Ages, there was the ruler (knez or archon) as supreme leader, and several župan across the country, who held limited authority and territory (župa).

According to De Administrando Imperio (DAI), "baptized Serbia" included the "inhabited cities" (kastra oikoumena) of Destinikon, Tzernabouskeï, Megyretous, Dresneïk, Lesnik and Salines, while the "small land" (chorion) of Bosnia, part of Serbia, had the cities of Katera and Desnik. Accordingly, Serbia proper originally included lands around rivers Lim, Tara, Piva, Ibar, West Morava, Upper Drina and Upper Bosna. DAI further describes Pagania (between Cetina and Neretva), Zachumlia (between Neretva and Dubrovnik), Travunia and Konavle (between Dubrovnik and Kotor), as Serb lands. These were all part of the Serbian state at least by the beginning of the 10th century, while Travunija is explicitly mentioned as part of the Serbian state by the mid-9th century. Duklja stretched from Kotor to towards Dyrrachion. Duklja, Konavli, Travunija and Zahumlje bordered Serbia, which included Bosnia, "in the mountain parts (hinterland)". The DAI shows that although regional division existed, as a whole, the Serbs ruled and lived in a notable part of the Balkans. More information, apart from charters and hagiographies, about the territories is found in the Chronicle of the Priest of Duklja (LPD, c. 1300), which also make mention of an intermediate Podgorje ("below the mountains") between Primorje (Latin: Maritima, "by the sea", Zeta, Travunija, Zahumlje) and Zagorje or Serbia (Latin: Transmontanta, Surbia, "behind the mountains", Serbia and Bosnia), which is not found in other sources. The Serbian state disintegrated in the second half of the 10th century, and was revived at the end of the 10th century with Duklja as the leading Serbian state, and in the 11th century all Serb lands except the Narentines came under it. The Serbian political centre switched back to Serbia proper (called Raška in historiography) at the end of the 11th century with the Serbian–Byzantine conflict. More information regarding territorial units follow from the 12th century.

== Serbia under the Nemanjić ==
The traditional lands of the medieval Serbian states were Serbia proper (or "Serbian lands", srpske zemlje), Duklja (or "Zeta"), Zahumlje (or "Hum lands"), and Travunija. The maritime principalities were also grouped in charters, hagiographies and regnal titles as the "maritime lands" (morske zemlje, pomorske zemlje).

The term župa ("county", pl. župe) was generally used in the Middle Ages for a settled and cultivated territorial unit with a set of administrative functions, made up of many villages. The older župe were defined clearly geographically, but with expansion of the state and local government, this was later not always the case. The majority of župe had a central administrative location (župski grad), while some small župe, part of larger units, did not have administrative functions. For larger provinces, the term zemlja ("land") was also used, made up of several župe, but it is not to be confused with the term for the crown lands (i.e. srpske zemlje, found in regnal titles) which signified far larger territory. At least by the time of King Stefan Milutin (r. 1282–1321), territories were given to military-civil governors (the nobility, vlastela), and were called država ("holding"), and these were generally larger than a single župa.

zemlje

- Raška zemlja, with the župe of Ras, Upper Ibar, Jelašnica, Sitnica, Upper and Lower Lab, and Držkovina.

župe

- Ston (in Hum), Ston and Pelješac in south Dalmatia.
- Mljet, an island in south Dalmatia.
- Žabsko (in Hum), Žaba mountain (Zažablje).
- Velika (in Hum), around Ljubuški.
- Gorimota/Imota (in Hum), Imotski field.
- Večenike/Večerić (in Hum), from Trebižat confluence to Mostar sands along Neretva banks.
- Popovo (in Hum), Popovo field.
- Luka (in Hum), on the lower Neretva.
- Dubrava (in Hum), between Stolac and Mostar in the Bregava valley.
- Dabar (in Hum), Dabar field.
- Trebinje (in Travunija), Trebinje.
- Dračevica (in Travunija), in Bay of Kotor.
- Risan (in Travunija), Risan.
- Konavlje (in Travunija), Konavle.
- Vrm (in Travunija), between Trebinje and Bileća.
- Ljubomir (in Travunija).
- Fatnica (in Travunija), Fatnica field.
- Rudine (in Travunija).
- Kruševica (in Travunija).
- Žrnovica (in Travunija), Župa dubrovačka.
- Vrsinje (in Travunija)
- Pilot (in Zeta), northeast of Lake Skadar.
- Luška (in Zeta), Lješkopolje.
- Podlužje (in Zeta), Žabljak.
- Kupelnik (in Zeta), east of Žabljak.
- Oblik (in Zeta), Taraboš.
- Prapratna (in Zeta), between Bar and Ulcinj.
- Crmnica (in Zeta), west shore of Lake Skadar.
- Grbalj (in Zeta), Bay of Kotor.
- Cuceva (in Zeta), around Budva.
- Onogošt (in "Podgorje"), around Nikšić.
- Morača (in "Podgorje"), Morača valley.
- Komarnica (in "Podgorje").
- Piva (in "Podgorje"), Piva valley.
- Gacko (in "Podgorje"), Gacko field.
- Nevesinje (in "Podgorje"), Nevesinje.
- Neretva (in "Podgorje"), upper Neretva.
- Rama (in "Podgorje").
- Viševa (Guisemo in "Podgorje"), Neretva source.
- Idbar (Debreca in "Podgorje"), Idbar valley.
- Kom (in "Podgorje"), possibly Glavatičevo.
- Ras or Raška, left banks of Raška to Golija.
  - Pnuća, sub-unit, Deževa valley.
- Soli, around Tuzla.
- Brvenik, around Brvenik.
- Zvečan, around Zvečan.
- Nikava, Pešter–Sjenica or towards Nova Varoš.
- Lugomir.
- Ibar, Ibar valley.
- Toplica, Toplica valley.
- Rasina, Rasina valley.
- Reke/Dubravnica, Pusta valley.
- Jošanica, Jošanica valley.
- Lugomir, the Lugomir valley.
- Glbočica/Dubočica, Veternica and Jablanica valleys.
- Drškovina, Klina and Drenica.
- Drenica, the Drenica region.
- Kostrc, between Milanovac and Crnoljeva.
- Podrimlje, left Drim valley.
- Hvosno, between Prokletije and White Drim.
- Patkovo, between Ervenik, White Drim and Paštrik.
- Lab, Lab valley in Kosovo field.
- Sitnica, Sitnica valley in Kosovo field.
- Lipljan, Lipljan in Kosovo field.
- Pomoravlje, South Morava valley.
- Zagrlata, left bank of South Morava (the Aleksinac area).
- Uška, between Mali Jastrebac and South Morava.
- Levač, between Juhor and Gledić.
- Belica, the Belica valley.
- Lepenica, Lepenica valley.
  - Upper (Gornja)
  - Lower (Donja)
- Nišava, the Nišava valley and Niš.
- Prizren, the Prizren basin.
- Vranje, Vranje area.
- Morava, the Binačka Morava valley.
- Polog.
- Krušilnica, north or west of West Morava.
- Morava, the West Morava valley.
- Borač, the Gruža valley (Gruža region).
- Nerodimlje, with Petrič, Svrčin and Pauni.
- Plav, the Plav area.
- Slavište, the Kriva Palanka area.
- Zletovo
- Žegligovo, the Kumanovo area.
- Skopje
- Ovče Pole
- Debar
- Ljuboviđa, the Bijelo Polje area.
- Morozvižd, the Bregalnica valley.
- Crna Stena, the Mileševa area.
- Altin, the Junik mountain area.
- Brskovo
- Kujavča
- Zatrnava
- Drina, Drina valley

== Moravian Serbia and the Serbian Despotate ==
Despot Stefan Lazarević (r. 1389–1427) established vlasti, territorial-administrative units headed by a vojvoda (general) who held local military and civil power, and were generally seated in a fortified city which the vlast was named after. The vlast was not established all over state territory.

- Podunavlje, larger province, Danube area.
- Kučevo, province.
- Mačva, province.
- Kruševačka vlast, seat in Kruševac Fortress.
- Boračka vlast, seat in Borač Fortress.
- Lepenička vlast, including Lepenica župa.
- Ostrovička vlast, seat in Ostrvica Fortress.
- Nekudimska vlast, seat in Nekudim royal estate.
- Smederevska vlast, seat in Smederevo Fortress.
- Golubačka vlast, seat in Golubac Fortress.
- Braničevska vlast, seat in Braničevo Fortress.
- Petruška vlast, seat in Petrus Fortress.
- Teočačka vlast, seat in Teočak Fortress.
- Tišnička/Tišačka vlast, seat in unknown Tišnica.
- Bitva.
- Mačva, župa.
- Morava, župa, the West Morava valley.
- Gornja Morava.
- Donja Morava.
- Borač, župa, the Gruža valley (Gruža region).
- Lepenica, župa, Lepenica valley.
- Zagrlata župa,
- Toplica župa,
- Dubočica župa,
- Dubravnica župa,
- Sjenica, župa, the Sjenica area.
- Osat, župa,
- Petrus, krajište.
- Lipovac, krajište.

== See also ==
- Administrative divisions of modern Serbia
- Administrative divisions of Serbia
- List of regions of Serbia
- Serbian royal titles

== Annotations ==
1. In DAI, the Paganians/Narentines held three župe (Rastok, Mokro, Dalen), four cities (Makarska, Vrulja, Zaostrog and Gradac) and large islands (Mljet, Korčula, Hvar, Brač), which they had acquired in the 8th century.
2. In DAI, Zahumlje included Bona (Blagaj), Hum, Ston with Pelješac, Mokriskik (perhaps Mokro in the southwest Mostar sands), Josli (Ošlje), Galumainik (perhaps Glumina), Dobriskik (likely Dabar in the Dabar field). The LPD mentions Ston, Popovo, Zapško or Zažablje, Luka on the Neretva, Dubrave. Later mentions of Hum lands include Velika Gor (around Ljubuški), Goromita (Imotski), Večenike (Večerići, likely Mostar field). All these were small županije presumably existing also before the time the LPD was written.
3. In DAI, Travunija and Konavli are spoken of as "one land", meaning they at some point early on were united. Along the coast, the land stretched from Dubrovnik to Kotor, and included the cities of Trebinje, Vrm, Risan, Lukavete (Luka near Trebinje) and Zetlivi (Necvijeće). According to the LPD, there were the following županije, Ljubomir, Fatnica, Rudine, Kruševica, Vrm, Risan, Dračevica, Konavli and Žrnovica (Župa dubrovačka).
4. In DAI, Duklja included the cities of Gradac, Novigrad and Lontodokla (all of unknown location), and stretched towards Lješ, Ulcinj and Bar. Duklja took its name from the ruins of Diokleia. According to the LPD, the province called Zeta included Luška (Lješkopolje), Podlužje (Žabljak), Kupelnik (east of Žabljak), Oblik (Taraboš), Prapratna (between Bar and Ulcinj), Crmnica (west shore of Lake Skadar), Grbalj, Cuceva (around Budva).

== Sources ==
- Blagojević, Miloš (2001). Државна управа у српским средњовековним земљама [State administration in the Serb medieval lands] (Second ed.). Službeni list SRJ. ISBN 9788635504971.
- Blagojević, Miloš (1996). "Жупа Реке и Дендра (Δένδρα) Јована Кинама". Зборник радова Византолошког института. 35: 197–212.
- Blagojević, Miloš (1983). "Преглед историјске географије средњовековне Србије" (PDF). Зборник Историјског музеја Србије. 20: 45-.
- Blagojević, Miloš (1992). "Град и жупа – међе градског друштва". In Kalić, Jovanka; Čolović, M. (eds.). Социјална структура српских градских насеља (XII–XIII) век [La structure sociale des agglomérations urbaines : (XIIe-XVIIIe s.)]. Смедерево–Београд.
- Ivanović, Miloš (2023). "Жупа Mорава и околне области у позном средњем веку". Краљево – град и људи. Историјски институт Београд. pp. 23–40.
- Ivanović, Miloš (2019). "Значај Подунавља у држави кнеза Лазара" [The Importance of Podunavlje in the State of Prince Lazar]. Смедеревски крај и Подунавље кроз историју.
- Katić, Tatjana; Vojvodić, Uglješa (2020). "Границе жупе и нахије Рас у средњем и раном новом веку (14.–16. век)". Историјски часопис (69). Историјски институт Београд: 127–155. doi:10.34298/ic2069127k. ISSN 0350-0802.
- Novaković, Relja (1979). "Још нешто поводом битке на Тари 1150. године". Историјски часопис. 25–26: 5– – via Google Books.
