= Golia =

Golia may refer to:

- Golia (surname)
- Golia, Ganjam
- Golia Monastery
- 1226 Golia

== See also ==
- Golija
