= Motor Totemist Guild =

American rock band

- Origin: Orange County, California, U.S.
- Genres: Avant-prog; avant-rock; chamber rock
- Years active: 1980–present
- Label: Rotary Totem
- Members: James Grigsby

Motor Totemist Guild is an American rock band, formed in 1980 in Orange County, California by band leader James Grigsby. Described as an avant-prog, avant-rock and chamber rock band, Motor Totemist Guild was noted for its songs that worked into epic durations and rich instrumentation but also forayed into free improvisation, sound collage, and other avant-garde techniques.

== History ==
Being the only constant member, Grigsby assembled an everchanging lineup, that featured vocalist Emily Hay, as well as Rod Poole (acoustic guitar), Bridget Convey (piano), Hannes Giger (contrabass), and David Kerman (drums). Grigsby disbanded the group in 1989 to focus on the project U-Totem. Nevertheless, Grigsby and Hay reunited the group in 1997 with a largely expanded lineup, including former members Lynn Johnston (clarinets, saxophone) and Eric Johnson-Tamai (bassoon). The new lineup also featured musicians from 1990s West Coast new jazz scene, such as Vinny Golia (clarinets, saxes), Jeff Kaiser (trumpet), and Brad Dutz (marimba and vibraphone). All of the band's albums were released through Grigsby's own label, Rotary Totem.

== Members ==
- James Grigsby - composition
- Emily Hay - vocals
- Rod Poole - acoustic guitar
- Bridget Convey - piano
- Hannes Giger - contrabass
- David Kerman - drums
- Lynn Johnston - clarinets, saxophone
- Eric Johnson-Tamai - bassoon
- Vinny Golia - clarinets, saxophone
- Jeff Kaiser - trumpet
- Brad Dutz - marimba and vibraphone

== Discography ==
Motor Totemist Guild discography as adapted from Discogs:

Studio albums

- Infra Dig (1984)
- Klang (1985)
- Contact With Veils (1986)
- Elements (1988)
- Shapuno Zoo (1988)
- Omaggio A Futi (1989)
- City of Mirrors (1999)
- All America City (2000)

Singles

- "Sub-Mission" / "Ballad of the Thin Man" (1984)

Compilations

- Archive One (1996)
- Archive Two (1996)
