= Plav =

Plav may refer to places:

== Montenegro ==
- Plav, Montenegro, a town
- Plav Municipality, a municipality
- Plav (župa), historical administrative area
- Lake Plav

== Czech Republic ==
- Plav (České Budějovice District), a municipality and village
