= Cetyně =

- Municipality
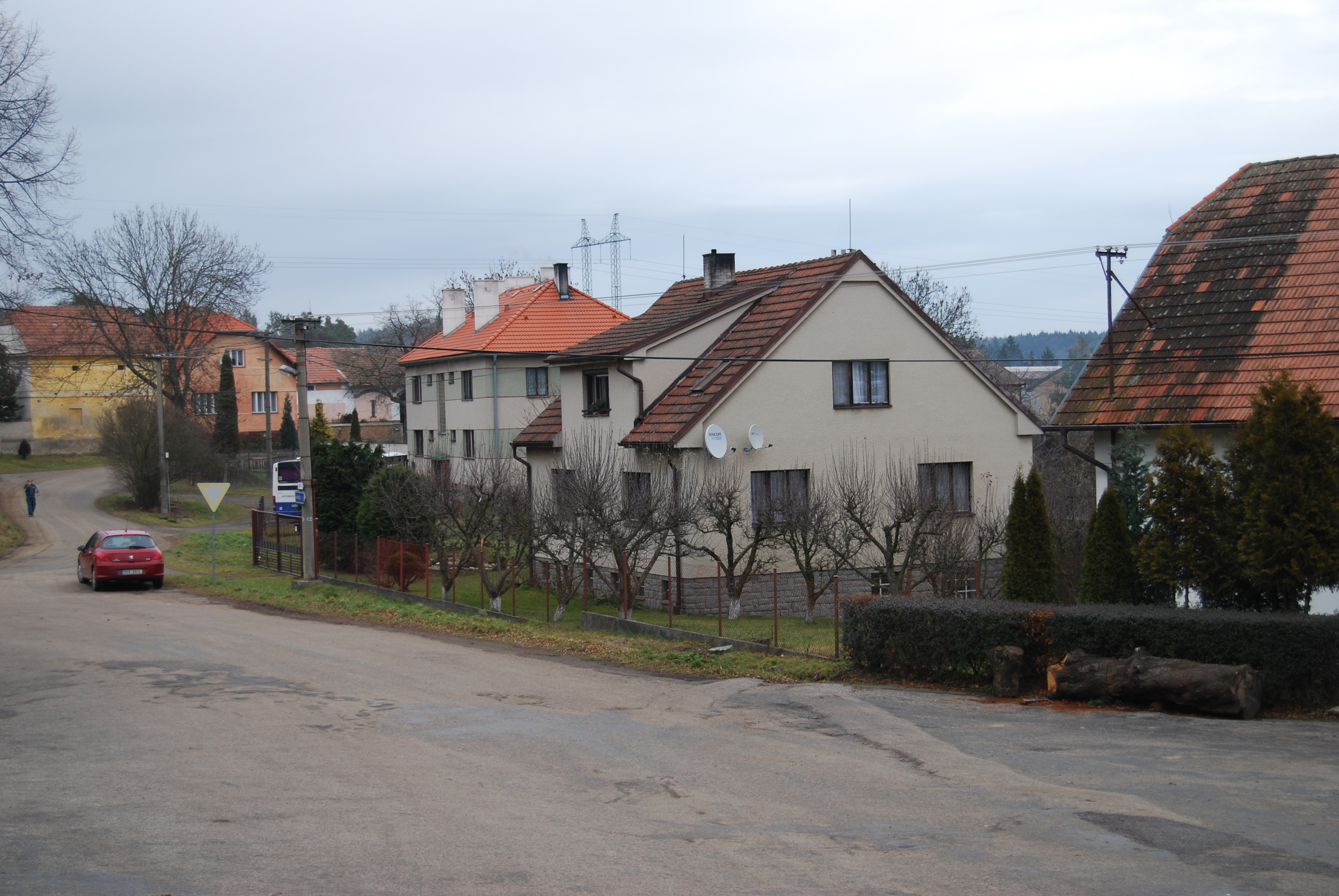
- Centre of Cetyně

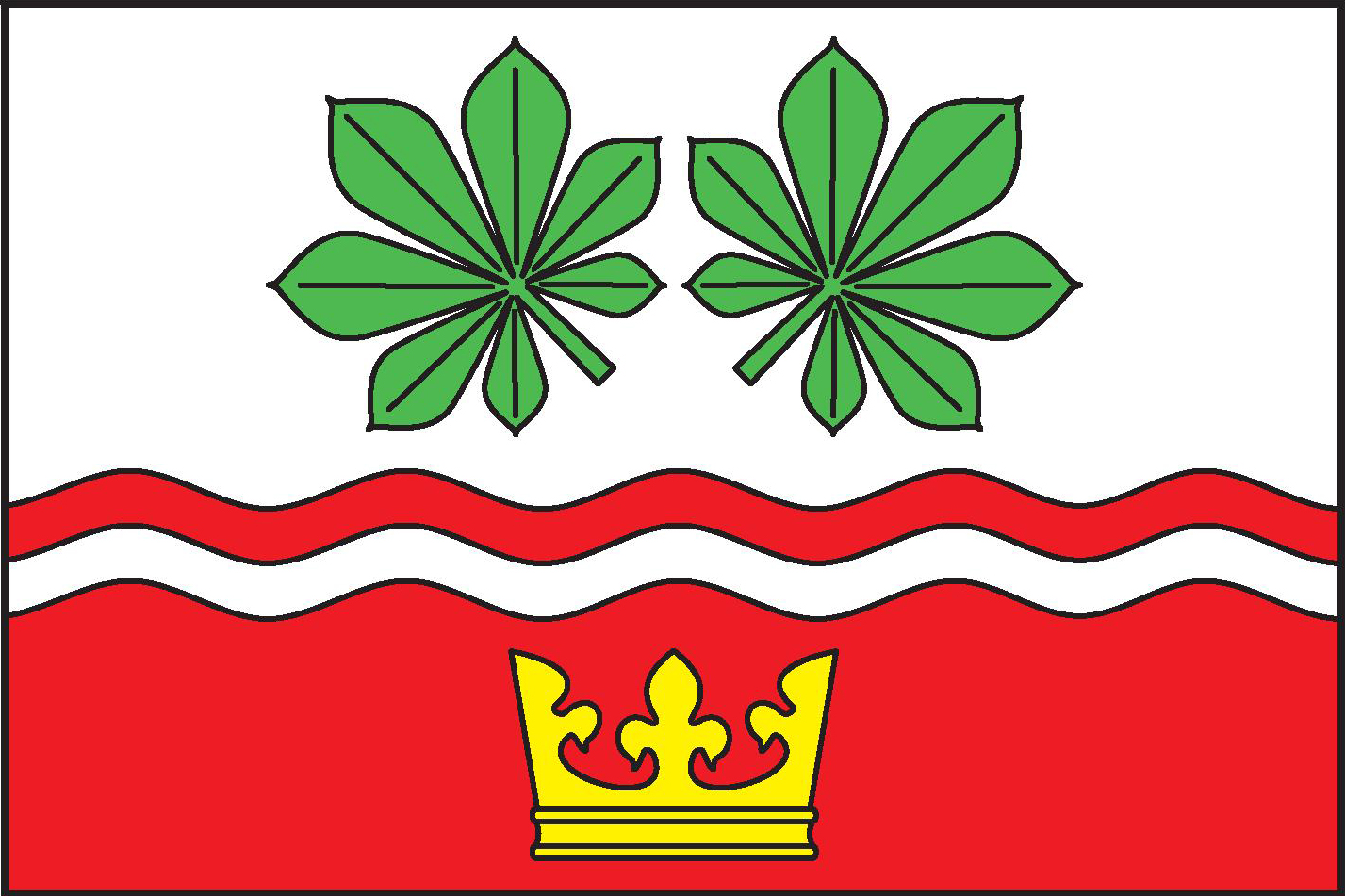
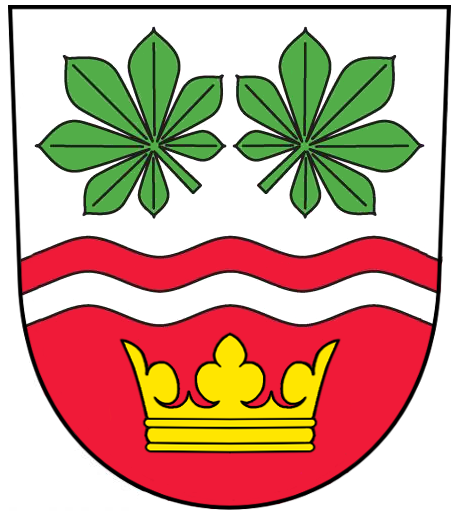
- Flag Coat of arms

- Location in the Czech Republic
- Coordinates: 49°35′59″N 14°7′17″E
- Country: Czech Republic
- Region: Central Bohemian
- District: Příbram
- First mentioned: 1336

Area
  - Total: 3.51 km^{2} (1.36 sq mi)
- Elevation: 480 m (1,570 ft)

Population (2026-01-01)
  - Total: 143
  - Density: 40.7/km^{2} (106/sq mi)
- Time zone: UTC+1 (CET)
  - Summer (DST): UTC+2 (CEST)
- Postal code: 262 31
- Website: www.cetyne.cz

Cetyně is a municipality and village in Příbram District in the Central Bohemian Region of the Czech Republic. It has about 100 inhabitants.

== Etymology ==
The name is derived from the personal name Cet, meaning "Cet's (village)".

== Geography ==
Cetyně is located about 13 kilometres (8 mi) southeast of Příbram and 53 km (33 mi) southwest of Prague. It lies in the Benešov Uplands. The highest point is at 579 m (1,900 ft) above sea level. The brook Bohostický potok flows through the municipality and supplies a fishponds on the edge of the village.

== History ==
The first written mention of Cetyně is from 1336. From 1980 to 1990, the village was an administrative part of Pečice.

== Demographics ==
Historical population

Year	Pop.	±%
1869	299	—
1880	274	−8.4%
1890	252	−8.0%
1900	225	−10.7%
1910	240	+6.7%

Year	Pop.	±%
1921	226	−5.8%
1930	210	−7.1%
1950	163	−22.4%
1961	171	+4.9%
1970	163	−4.7%

Year	Pop.	±%
1980	180	+10.4%
1991	182	+1.1%
2001	174	−4.4%
2011	146	−16.1%
2021	148	+1.4%

Source: Censuses

== Transport ==
There are no railways or major roads passing through the municipality.

== Sights ==
There are no protected cultural monuments in the municipality.
