= 17 Themes for Ockodektet =

Studio album by The Jeff Kaiser Ockodektet
- Released: 2002
- Recorded: December 8, 2001
- Venue: Ventura City Hall, Ventura, California
- Genre: Avantgarde; Free Improvisation; Jazz
- Length: 1:13:34
- Label: pfMENTUM
- Producer: Jeff Kaiser

The Jeff Kaiser Ockodektet chronology
| 17 Themes for Ockodektet (2002) | 13 Themes for a Triskaidekaphobic (2003) |

17 Themes for Ockodektet is a live album by The Jeff Kaiser Ockodektet, released in 2002 on pfMENTUM – CD010.

== Track listing ==
Suite One
| No. | Title | Length |
|---|---|---|
| 1. | "Dirge" | 2:31 |
| 2. | "Clad Like Birds" | 3:40 |
| 3. | "Amplifying Their Parallels" | 7:01 |
| 4. | "Nothing May Be Taken Naturally" | 2:56 |
| 5. | "Even With Diagrams" | 8:12 |
| 6. | "One Absolute Material" | 5:54 |
| 7. | "Figures Of This Inbetween" | 3:05 |
| 8. | "Figures To Be Actualities" | 4:27 |
| 9. | "Figure With Wings" | 7:09 |

Suite Two
| No. | Title | Length |
|---|---|---|
| 10. | "Coincidentia Oppositorum" | 3:55 |
| 11. | "Where His Third Eye Could Be" | 3:59 |
| 12. | "Fulfilled By The Reflected Image" | 7:41 |
| 13. | "There Is No Profit From Dreams" | 7:55 |
| 14. | "Into That Nothingbetween" | 5:07 |
| Total length: | | 1:13:34 |

== Credits ==
Acoustic Guitar [Prepared] – Ernesto Diaz-Infante
Conductor, Trumpet, Composed By, Arranged By, Recorded By, Mastered By, Design, Layout – Jeff Kaiser
Contrabass – Jim Connolly, Scott Walton
Drums – Billy Mintz, Richie West
Electric Guitar – Tom McNalley
Electric Guitar, Electronics – G.E. Stinson
Euphonium, Valve Trombone – Eric Sbar
Organ, Theremin, Electronics – Wayne Peet
Percussion – Brad Dutz
Trombone – Michael Vlatkovich
Trumpet – Dan Clucas, Kris Tiner
Tuba – Mark Weaver
Woodwind – Emily Hay, Eric Barber, Lynn Johnston, Vinny Golia
