= Hvosno =

Medieval Serbian county

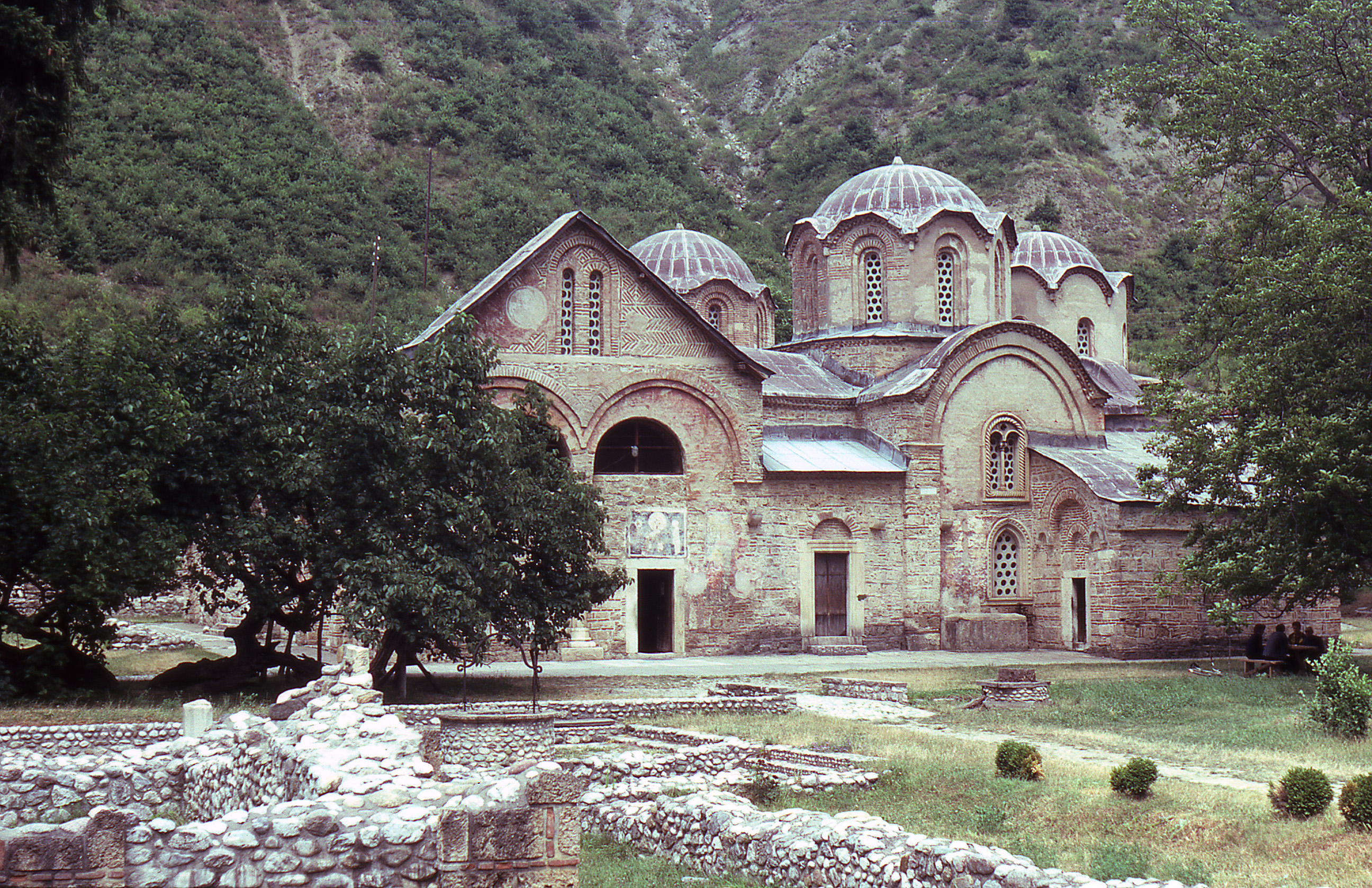
The Patriarchal Monastery of Peć in Hvosno, seat of Serbian Orthodox church from the late 13th century up to 1766 (as photographed in 1980)

Hvosno (Serbian Cyrillic: Хвосно, "thick wood") was a medieval Serbian county (Serbian: жупа / župa) located in the northern part of the Metohija region, in what is today Kosovo. It roughly encompassed the areas of the modern Istog and Peja municipalities. It was surrounded by the counties of Jelci to the north; Budimlja and Plav to the west; Zatrnava to the south; Drškovina and Podrimlje to the east and southeast.

== Name ==
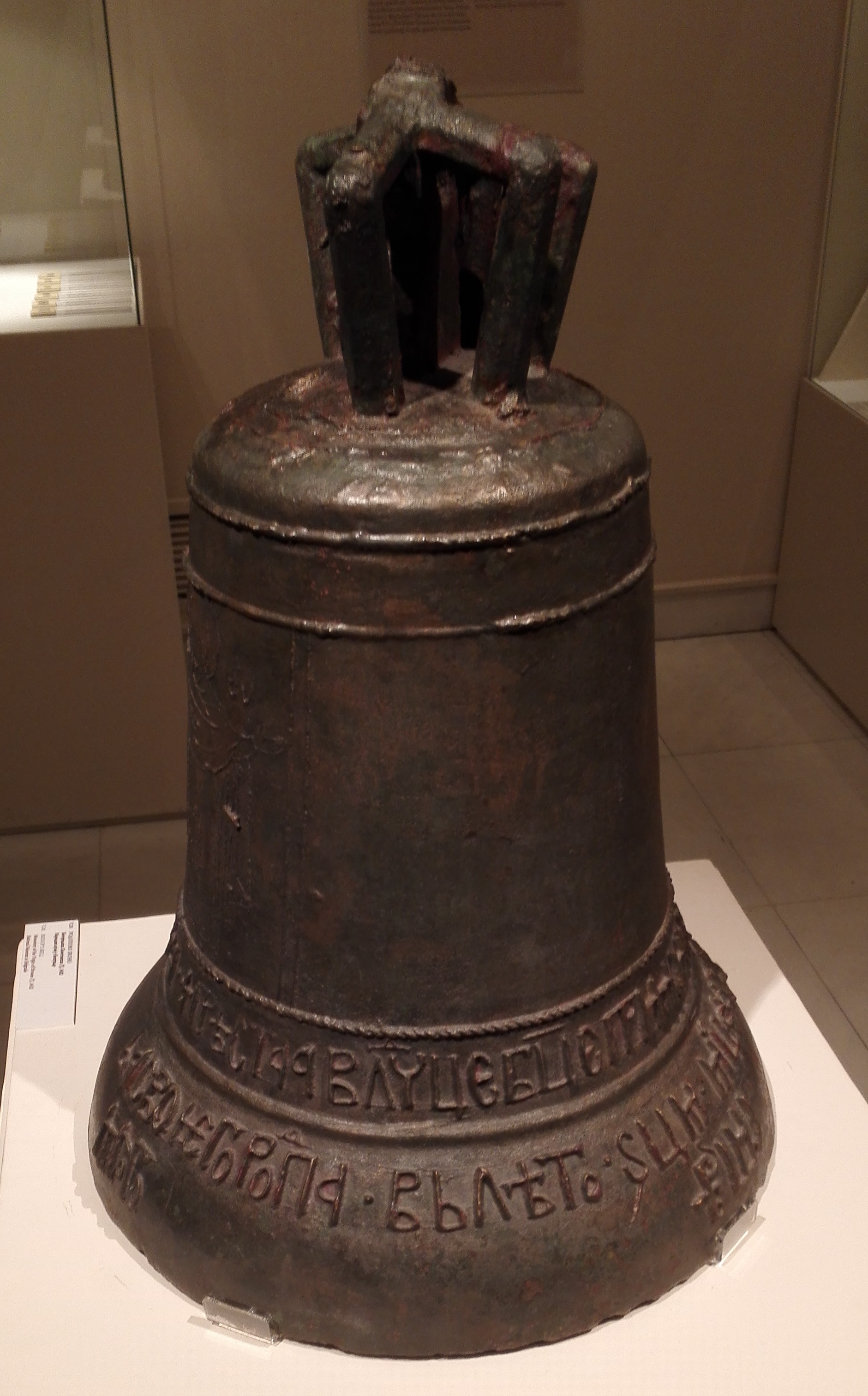
Old bell of the Monastery of the Mother of God in Hvosno

The name of Hvosno is derived from the Old Slavic word hvost, meaning 'thick wood', probably due to dense forests that grow on the slopes of surrounding mountains. Several of the oldest toponyms in the area have parallels as far away as in the Czech Republic (Trebovitić–Třebovětice, Ljutoglav–Litohlavy and Drsnik–Drsník), showing that it was inhabited by Slavs.

== History ==
Hvosno, as Hosnos (Greek: Χoσνoς, romanized: Khosnos) was mentioned in three charters of Byzantine emperor Basil II (r. 976–1025), issued in 1018–1020, as being under the jurisdiction of the Eparchy of Prizren. From that time and up to 1219, the Eparchy of Prizren (including Hvosno) was under jurisdiction of the Eastern Orthodox Archbishopric of Ohrid. In 1072, during the South Slavic uprising (1071–1073) against the Byzantine rule, the region was temporarily captured by the rebels, who proclaimed prince Constantine Bodin as emperor in Prizren, but the uprising was soon crushed and Byzantine control over the region restored.

Serbian Grand Prince Stefan Nemanja (r. 1169–1196) managed to gain full independence from the Byzantines and started to expand his domains, capturing Hvosno among other territories. Hvosno was mentioned in the Life of Saint Simeon, written between 1201 and 1208 by his son and first Serbian archbishop Saint Sava, as one of the districts that Serbian Grand župan Stefan Nemanja (Saint Simeon) conquered from the Byzantine Empire between 1180 and 1190. Besides Hvosno, those regions were: Patkovo, Podrimlje, Kostrc, Drškovina, Prizren, Lab, Lipljan and Sitnica.

It appears that beside the župa (county) of Hvosno there was also a larger territory called zemlja (lit. "land") of Hvosno which encompassed the župa of Hvosno and some of the surrounding ones: Kujavča, Zatrnava, Podrimlje and Kostrc. The zemlja of Hvosno later corresponded to the territorial spread of the bishopric of Hvosno. Nemanja gave the rule of Hvosno to his elder son Vukan, who in 1195 is titled as "King of Duklja, Dalmatia, Travunia, Toplica and Hvosno" (Velcani, regis Diokle, Dalmatie, Tripunie, Toplize et Cosne).

In 1219, the Serbian Orthodox Archbishopric of Žiča was created in the medieval Kingdom of Serbia, and northern parts of the Eparchy of Prizren were reorganized as the new Eparchy of Hvosno, centered in the Monastery of the Mother of God in Hvosno. In the same time, the archiepiscopal monastery of Žiča gained a metochion (complex of monastic properties) in the region of Hvosno, centered around Peć and encompassing eight villages in the Bistrica valley. During the tenure of the second Serbian archbishop Arsenije I (1233–1263), that metochion was transformed into the Peć monastery, and by the end of the 13th century, the seat of Serbian archbishops was moved from Žiča to Peć, thus placing the region of Hvosno in the very center of Serbian ecclesiastical life. Since 1346, when the Serbian Patriarchate of Peć was established, the Eparchy of Hvosno remained under its jurisdiction up to the abolition of the Patriarchate in 1766.

After the Fragmentation of the Serbian Empire (1371), the region was ruled within feudal domains of the Branković dynasty, the last ruling house of the Serbian Despotate. By the middle of the 15th century, the entire region of Metohija, including Hvosno, was conquered by the Ottomans and initially included into the Sanjak of Prizren, and later into the newly created Sanjak of Peć. The region was briefly liberated in 1689–1690, during the Habsburg-Ottoman War (1683–1699), that initiated the Great Migration of the Serbs.

The region remained under Ottoman rule until the First Balkan War (1912), when it was divided between the Kingdom of Montenegro (major part) and the Kingdom of Serbia (minor part). In 1918, the region became part of the newly proclaimed Kingdom of Serbs, Croats and Slovenes, known since 1929 as Yugoslavia. In 1941, during the Second World War in Yugoslavia, the region was occupied by the Fascist Italy and included into the Fascist Albania. After the liberation in 1944–1945, it became part of the Autonomous Region of Kosovo and Metohija, within the Peoples Republic of Serbia, a federal unit of the Federal People's Republic of Yugoslavia. In 1992, the administrative Peć District was established, corresponding approximately to the historical region of Hvosno. Since 2008, the entire region is claimed both by Serbia and Kosovo.

In memory of the former eparchy and the historical region of Hvosno, several auxiliary bishops of the Serbian Orthodox Church have been granted the title bishop of Hvosno since 1947, first of them being Varnava Nastić.

== See also ==
- Monastery of the Mother of God in Hvosno
- Eparchy of Raška and Prizren

== Annotations ==
1. The name of Hvosno is derived from the Old Slavic word hvost, meaning 'thick wood', probably due to dense forests that grow on the slopes of surrounding mountains.

== Sources ==
- Bataković, Dušan T., ed. (2005). Histoire du peuple serbe [History of the Serbian People] (in French). Lausanne: L’Age d’Homme.
- Благојевић, Милош (2006). "Српска административна подела Косова и Метохије у XII веку" (PDF). Срби на Косову и у Метохији: Зборник радова са научног скупа. Београд: Српска академија наука и уметности. pp. 125–138. Archived from the original on 2011-07-27.
- Bubalo, Đorđe (2017). "In times of the independent medieval state" (PDF). Artistic Heritage of the Serbian People in Kosovo and Metohija: History, Identity, Vulnerability, Protection. Belgrade: Serbian Academy of Sciences and Arts. pp. 17–30.
- Ćirković, Sima (2004). The Serbs. Malden: Blackwell Publishing.
- Dimić, Ljubodrag (2017). "During modern and contemporary times" (PDF). Artistic Heritage of the Serbian People in Kosovo and Metohija: History, Identity, Vulnerability, Protection. Belgrade: Serbian Academy of Sciences and Arts. pp. 49–77.
- Đorđević, Života; Pejić, Svetlana, eds. (1999). Cultural Heritage of Kosovo and Metohija. Belgrade: Institute for the Protection of Cultural Monuments of the Republic of Serbia.
- Fine, John Van Antwerp Jr. (1994) [1987]. The Late Medieval Balkans: A Critical Survey from the Late Twelfth Century to the Ottoman Conquest. Ann Arbor, MI: University of Michigan Press.
- Ivić, Pavle, ed. (1995). The History of Serbian Culture. Edgware: Porthill Publishers.
- Katić, Tatjana (2017). "Administrative Division, Settlements and Demographics in the First Centuries of Ottoman Rule" (PDF). Artistic Heritage of the Serbian People in Kosovo and Metohija: History, Identity, Vulnerability, Protection. Belgrade: Serbian Academy of Sciences and Arts. pp. 41–48. Archived from the original on 2025-01-25.
- Marković, Miodrag; Vojvodić, Dragan, eds. (2017). Serbian Artistic Heritage in Kosovo and Metohija: Identity, Significance, Vulnerability. Belgrade: Serbian Academy of Sciences and Arts.
- Mileusnić, Slobodan (1998) [1995]. Medieval Monasteries of Serbia (4th ed.). Novi Sad: Pravoslavna reč; Prometej.
- Peić, Sava (1994). Medieval Serbian Culture. London: Alpine Fine Arts Collection.
- Petković, Vesna; Peić, Sava (2013). Serbian Medieval Cultural Heritage. Belgrade: Dereta.
- Popović, Svetlana (2002). "The Serbian Episcopal sees in the thirteenth century" (PDF). Старинар. 51 (2001): 171–184.
- Samardžić, Radovan; Duškov, Milan, eds. (1993). Serbs in European Civilization. Belgrade: Nova, Serbian Academy of Sciences and Arts, Institute for Balkan Studies. ISBN 9788675830153.
- Sotirović, Vladislav B. (2011). "The Serbian Patriarchate of Peć in the Ottoman Empire: The First Phase (1557–94)" (PDF). Serbian Studies. 25 (2): 143–169. Archived from the original (PDF) on 2016-08-10.
- Subotić, Gojko (1998). Art of Kosovo: The Sacred Land. New York: The Monacelli Press.
- Šuletić, Nebojša (2017). "Under Ottoman Rule: Until the End of the 18th Century" (PDF). Artistic Heritage of the Serbian People in Kosovo and Metohija: History, Identity, Vulnerability, Protection. Belgrade: Serbian Academy of Sciences and Arts. pp. 31–39.
- Točanac-Radović, Isidora (2022). "The Great Migration of Serbs and the Question of the Serbian Ethnic and Religious Community in the Habsburg Monarchy". Migrations in the Slavic Cultural Space: From the Middle Ages to the Present Day. Łódź: Łódź University Press. pp. 15–27.
- Todić, Branislav (2017). "Place in the history of Serbian culture" (PDF). Artistic Heritage of the Serbian People in Kosovo and Metohija: History, Identity, Vulnerability, Protection. Belgrade: Serbian Academy of Sciences and Arts. pp. 147–163.
- Živković, Tibor; Bojanin, Stanoje; Petrović, Vladeta, eds. (2000). Selected Charters of Serbian Rulers (XII-XV Century): Relating to the Territory of Kosovo and Metohia. Athens: Center for Studies of Byzantine Civilisation.
