= Sniježnica =

Sniježnica may refer to:

- Sniježnica (mountain in Croatia), a mountain near Konavle
- Sniježnica, Teočak, a village in Bosnia and Herzegovina
- Sniježnica (lake), a lake in Bosnia
- Sniježnica (mountain in Bosnia and Herzegovina), a mountain in Herzegovina
