= Nothing Is Not Breath: Music for Double Quartet =

Live album by Jeff Kaiser
- Released: 1998
- Recorded: November 22, 1997
- Venue: Ventura City Hall, Ventura, California
- Genre: Avantgarde; free improvisation
- Length: 1:09:08
- Label: Nine Winds

Nothing Is Not Breath: Music for Double Quartet is a live album by Jeff Kaiser, released in 1998 on Nine Winds, NWCD0206. AllMusic said that "Many fans of avant-garde jazz find his 1997 recording Nothing Is Not Breath: Music for Double Quartet to be one of the best presentations of Southern California improvising talent ever recorded, indicating his superior talents as a bandleader and conductor."

== Track listing ==
Track listing for Nothing Is Not Breath
No.	Title	Length
1.	"Section I"	13:22
2.	"Section II"	8:01
3.	"Section III"	2:41
4.	"Section IV"	4:08
5.	"Section V"	8:48
6.	"Section VI"	6:01
7.	"Section VII"	6:38
8.	"Section IX"	3:30
9.	"Section IX"	4:03
10.	"Section X"	7:46
11.	"Section XI"	4:10
Total length:		1:09:08

== Personnel ==
- Bass clarinet, flute [alto], bass saxophone, soprano saxophone – Vinny Golia
- Double bass – Hannes Giger, Jim Connolly
- Drums, toys, whistle [human] – Richard West
- Organ [pump], trumpet – Jeff Kaiser
- Trombone – Michael Vlatkovitch
- Trombone, chimes, gong, marimba, timpani, bodhrán, rattles – Brad Dutz
- Engineer – Roy Jones
- Mastered by John Golden
- Cover art, design – Ted Killian
