= Vrelo, Istog =

Village in Istog, Kosovo

Vrella: Vrellë or Tedel (Albanian); Врело/Vrelo (Serbian)
- Village
- Interactive map of Vrella
- Location in Kosovo
- Coordinates: 42°46′14″N 20°24′16″E
- Country: Kosovo
- District: Peja
- Municipality: Istog

Population (2024)
  - Total: 2,412
- Time zone: UTC+1 (CET)
  - Summer (DST): UTC+2 (CEST)

Vrella (Serbian Cyrillic: Врело) or Vrellë (in Albanian), formerly Vrela (Врела) or Tedel (former name in Albanian) is a village in Istog municipality, Kosovo.

== Demography ==
The village has an Albanian ethnic majority.

== History ==
Vrelo was first mentioned in written sources in 1397, when Princess Milica of Serbia donated the Vrela hamlet to Visoki Dečani monastery. In census from 1485, monastery of Our Lady of Hvosno with 5 monks is mentioned. For a time, monastery elder was Makarije Sokolović, future Patriarch of the Serbian Orthodox Church. Near the monastery are remains of an unnamed fort, and high above the place several hermitages have been found. In the upper part of the village the ruins of an old Illyro-Dardan church from byzantine times have been found – confirming the existence of the village during Illyrian-Albanian rule.
