= Jeff Kaiser (musician) =

American trumpet player and composer (born 1961)

- Born: December 26, 1961 (age 64)
- Genre: avant-garde
- Occupations: Musician, composer
- Instrument: Trumpet
- Labels: pfMENTUM, Angry Vegan
- Website: jeffkaiser.com

Jeff Kaiser (born December 26, 1961) is an American trumpet player and composer who teaches music technology and music composition at the University of Central Missouri. As a trumpet player, he has performed and recorded with Vinny Golia's Large Ensemble, Eugene Chadbourne, The Motor Totemist Guild, and Guerino Mazzola, and played on the soundtrack for the HBO TV series Deadwood. As a composer and performer, Kaiser's recording on Nine Winds Records, Nothing is Not Breath, has been referred to on AllMusic as "one of the best presentations of Southern California improvising talent ever recorded, indicating his superior talents as a bandleader and conductor.” Performances of his experimental big band, The Jeff Kaiser Ockodektet, have been included among the top jazz concerts in San Diego.

== Discography ==
=== As Leader/Co-Leader ===
Jeff Kaiser Ockodektet

- 132350 - The Jeff Kaiser Ockodektet (pfMENTUM 2021)
- The Alchemical Mass/Suite Solutio - The Jeff Kaiser Ockodektet (pfMENTUM 2004)
- 13 Themes for a Triskaidekaphobic - The Jeff Kaiser Ockodektet (pfMENTUM 2003)
- 17 Themes for Ockodektet - The Jeff Kaiser Ockodektet (pfMENTUM 2002)

The Desert Fathers (with Gregory Taylor)

- Charismata (pfMENTUM 2012)
- Coptic Icons (pfMENTUM 2007)

The Choir Boys (with Andrew Pask)

- The Choir Boys with Strings - Jeff Kaiser and Andrew Pask with Steuart Liebig and G.E. Stinson: The Choir Boys with Strings (pfMENTUM 2006)
- The Choir Boys (pfMENTUM 2005)

KaiBorg (with David Borgo)

- Vibrant Matters — with David Borgo (pfMENTUM, 2017)
- Harvesting Metadata — with David Borgo (pfMENTUM 2010)

Miscellaneous duos

- Endless Pie — with Phil Skaller (pfMENTUM, 2013)
- Chimney Liquor — with Nicholas Deyoe (Eh? Records, 2012)
- Transistor Illumicator — with Don Haugen (Control Valve 2010)
- Corpseboy and Justin Cassidy: Grain of the Voice (Papercuts Records and Angry Vegan Records 2009)
- ZUGZWANG - with Tom McNalley (pfMENTUM 2006)
- Order of Her Bones — with Brad Dutz (pfMENTUM, 2002)
- Pith Balls and Inclined Planes — with Ernesto Diaz-Infante (pfMENTUM, 2000)
- Asphalt Buddhas — with Woody Aplanalp (pfMENTUM, 1999)
- Ganz Andere — with Vinny Golia (pfMENTUM, 1999)

Miscellaneous ensembles

- External Logic Machine — with Ted Byrnes and Tom McNalley (pfMENTUM 2011)
- Nothing Is Not Breath: Music for Double Quartet (Nine Winds, 1997)

Solo

- Excerpts from the Prince (Burned Tongue, 1995)

=== As Ensemble Member ===
- Raw Meat Diet: The League of Assholes (Titicacaman Records 2018)
- Skeleton Key Orchestra: Furiously Dreaming (Orenda Records 2016)
- Here & Here & Here: Anna Homler (pfMENTUM 2014)
- Vinny Golia Large Ensemble: Overview; 1996-2006 [CD + DVD] (NineWinds, 2012)
- An Autobiography of a Pronoun: Michael Vlatkovich (pfMENTUM 2011)
- Kronomorphic: David Borgo and Paul Pellegrin (pfMENTUM 2011)
- Sound Check Three, UCSD Music Department (UCSD, 2008)
- On the Shore — Mark O’Leary, Alex Cline, Steuart Liebig, John Fumo, Jeff Kaiser (Clean Feed, 2007)
- Blur Joan — Headless Household (House Ink, 2005)
- The Vinny Golia Large Ensemble: 20th Anniversary Concert (DVD, NineWinds, 2005)
- post-Polka — Headless Household (House Ink, 2003)
- Blown Away — Warm Guns (Zircon Skye, 2002)
- Time Stops To Visit — Jim Connolly and the Gove County Philharmonic (pfMENTUM 2002)
- Monkey Cantata — Ray Waggoner (5 Koilos, 2000)
- The Circus Doesn’t Stop at Gove — Jim Connolly and the Gove County Philharmonic (pfMENTUM, 2000)
- mockhausen — Headless Household (House Ink, 2000)
- Beauty and the Bloodsucker — Eugene Chadbourne (Leo, 1999)
- The Other Bridge — Vinny Golia Large Ensemble (Nine Winds, 1999)
- Free Associations — Headless Household (House Ink, 1999)
- City of Mirrors — Motor Totemist Guild (Cuneiform, 1998)
- Items — Headless Household (House Ink, 1996)
