= Golia (surname) =

Golia is a surname. Notable people with the surname include:

- Grigoria Golia (born 1974), Greek handball player
- Pavel Golia (1887–1959), Slovenian poet and playwright
- Piero Golia (born 1974), Italian conceptual artist
- Vinny Golia (born 1946), American composer and multi-instrumentalist
