= Zupci =

Historical region in Old Herzegovina, Montenegro

Coordinates: 42.1278°N 19.1186°E

Zupci is a historical region in Old Herzegovina, Montenegro. The medieval county of Vrsinje became the domain of the Zupci, while they were not fully formed as a tribe when they were first mentioned. The Zupci had earlier been mentioned as a family or people part of Vrsinje; in 1403 as "homo de Versigna Xubeç", in 1421 as "de Versigne de genere Zubaç", in 1466 as "de Versigne Vlachos Xubci sic dictos". As seen from the Ottoman defter of 1475–77, the Zupci nahija replaced Vrsinje.
