= Teočak Fortress =

- tvrđava Teočak
- Teočak, Bosnia and Herzegovina
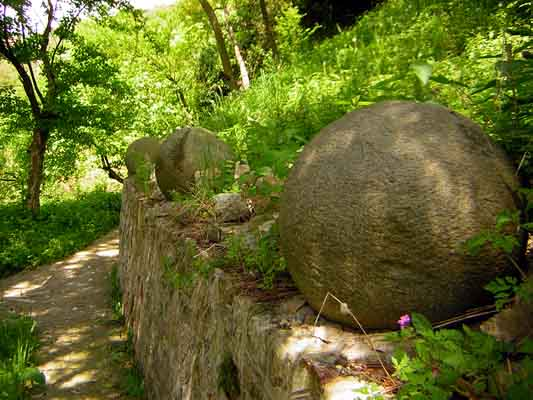
- Stone balls, remnants of the castle

Location
- Location within Bosnia and Herzegovina
- Coordinates: 44°35′58″N 19°01′27″E

Site history
- Built: Before 1432

Teočak Fortress (Bosnian: Tvrđava Teočak) was a medieval fortress located in Teočak in northeastern Bosnia and Herzegovina. It was strategically located at the Majevica range which overlooks the Drina and Sava rivers and important places such as Bijeljina and Brčko in the Semberija region. Today, there are remains of the foundations of the fortress in the locality of Stari Teočak ("Old Teočak") next to the modern town of Teočak.

== Construction ==
The shape of the triangular base is reminiscent of Smederevo Fortress.

== History ==
By July 1411, Srebrenica and most of the Podrinje region (west of the mid-course of Drina) came under the rule of Serbian Despot Stefan Lazarević (r. 1389–1427), a Hungarian vassal, and remained so until 1439 with the first fall of the Despotate. Teočak was organized into the Teočačka vlast. Despot Đurađ Branković (1427–1456) expanded into Usora. By 1433, Despot Đurađ held the Zvornik Fortress and likely the Teočak Fortress, an area that had up until then been part of the domain of the Zlatonosović family, who were Hungarian vassals. The Ottoman Empire occupied Podrinje in 1439–1444, and the 1444 treaty had the area returned to Despot Đurađ, however, after the Bosnian king Thomas fought the Ottomans in Srebrenica 1444, it changed hands several times between Bosnia and Serbia until 1455. The 1451 treaty between Sultan Mehmed II and Đurađ, as well as the 1457 recognition of Lazar Branković, saw Podrinje with larger parts of Usora remained in Serbian hands. Upon the death of Despot Lazar in 1458, Bosnian king Thomas took 12 fortresses from the Despotate, including Teočak. In 1459, the Ottomans conquered Serbia and in the next few years took Podrinje, with Teočak being surrounded in early 1461. Due to the Ottoman closing in, allegedly the relics of St. Evangelist Luke were transferred to Jajce.

In 1449, Hungarian nobleman Nicholas of Ilok was titled "perpetual count of Thelchak" (Latin: comes perpetuus de Thelchak). Nicholas, who was also the titular King of Bosnia, sat at Teočak for five years (1472–1477). Teočak came under Ottoman rule following the 1512 conquest of the Srebrenica banate. The area became part of the Završje nahiya which lay west of Sapna and Teočak. Below the fortress on the same hill is a mosque allegedly built during rule of Sultan Mehmed II the Conqueror, who captured the fortress from the Kingdom of Hungary in early 1474.

== See also ==
- List of fortifications in Bosnia and Herzegovina
- Sniježnica, Teočak

== Sources ==
- Jakovljevic, Aleksandar (2015). "Između osmanskog i ugarskog krajišta – Osmansko zaposedanje Podrinja i ugarska opsada Zvornika 1464. godine". Pad bosanskog kraljevstva 1463. godine = Fall of the Bosnian Kingdom in 1463.
