= Monastery of the Mother of God in Hvosno =

Serbian Orthodox monastery in Kosovo

Coordinates: 42°46′14″N 20°24′16″E

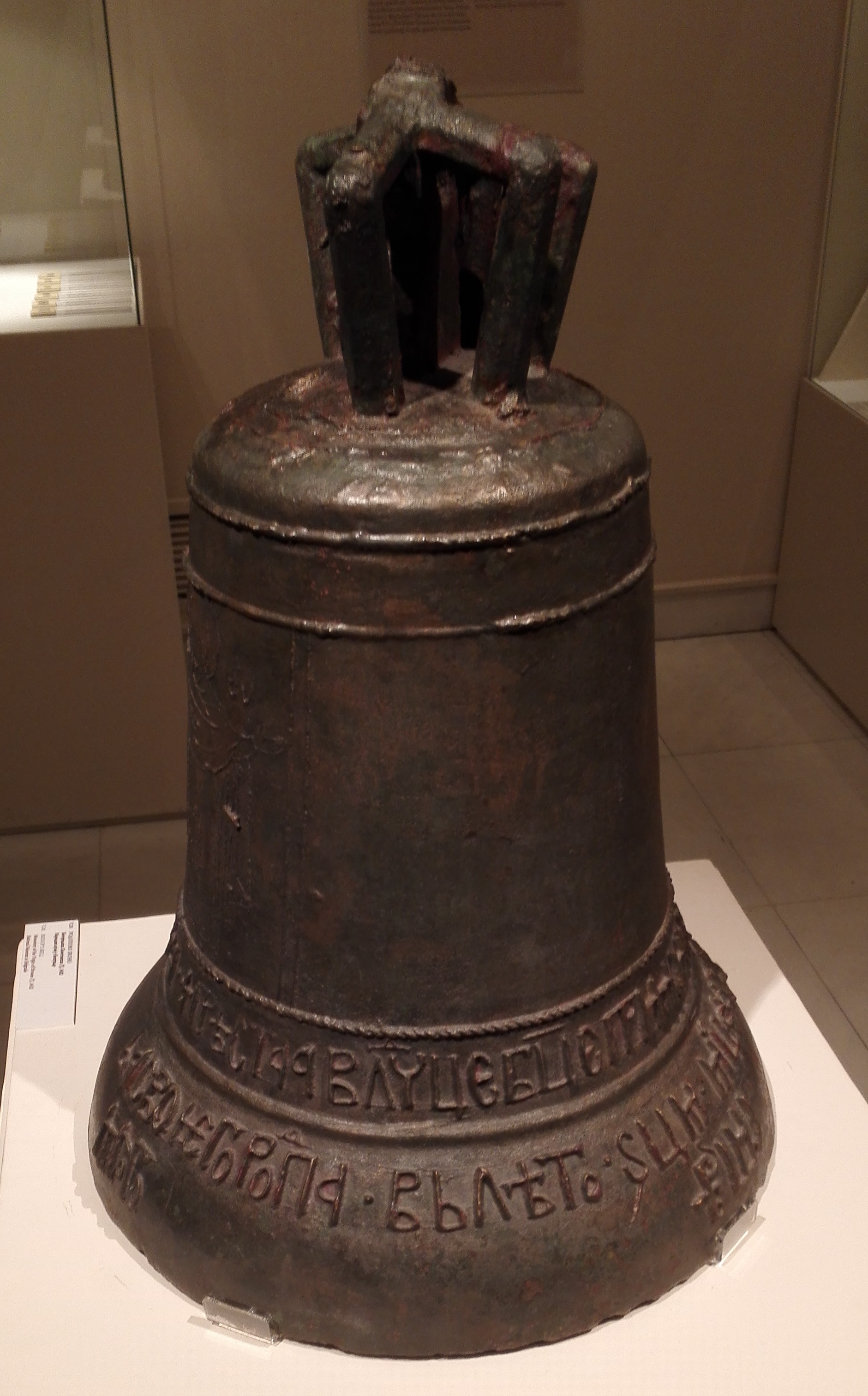
Old bell of the Mother of God Monastery in Hvosno

Monastery of the Mother of God in Hvosno (Serbian: Богородица Хвостанска/Bogorodica Hvostanska, Albanian: Manastiri i Virgjëreshës së Shenjtë të Hvosnos) was a Serbian Christian monastery of the Serbian Orthodox Church in the historical region of Hvosno. It was situated at the foot of Mokra Mountain, nearby hamlets Vrelo and Studenica, some 20 kilometers (12 mi) north of the city of Peć, in modern Kosovo. The Monastery was declared Monument of Culture of Exceptional Importance on 10 July 1967, and Republic of Serbia claims to have it under protection.

In the third decade of the 13th century, on the foundations of an older basilica, a new church dedicated to the Dormition of the Theotokos was erected in order to serve as a cathedral seat of the Serbian Orthodox Eparchy of Hvosno. The single-nave church had a dome and an altar apse, semi-circular on the inside, rectangular on the outside. On the northern and southern sides of the narthex, there were two parecclesia, whose outside was masked with a flat surface. The chapels were topped by two towers of greater height than the church dome. The church is in compliance with the Rascian architecture. In the mid-14th century, another single-nave building with a semi-circular apse on the east, and a barrel-vault was adjoined to the church. The second half of the 16th century is a period of artistic thrive of the monastery. Debris of the monastery complex were first researched in 1930, and then from 1966 to 1970, when remains of the church and the monks dwelling-house, together with segments of the fortification, were preserved.

== History ==
The oldest architectural layers on the site belong to a church dating from the 6th century, and it is assumed that the structure was built during the early Byzantine revival of emperor Justinian I in northern Illyricum, including the province of Dardania. It is one of the earliest churches dating from the mid-6th century, i.e. pre-Slavic migration, and therefore constructed in the early Eastern Roman style. Within its Byzantine fortification were two three-nave basilicas with its narthex belonging to the early Byzantine Period. The semi-circle apse of the main church relates to the early reign of the Emperor Justinian and the first decades of the 6th century, as later churches were built with outer three-sided apses, under the influence of the Constantinople construction style.

In 1219, the Serbian Orthodox Archbishopric of Žiča was established in the medieval Kingdom of Serbia, and northern parts of the Eparchy of Prizren were reorganized as the new Eparchy of Hvosno, centered in the newly rebuild Monastery of the Mother of God in Hvosno. Since 1346, when the Serbian Patriarchate of Peć was established, the Monastery and the Eparchy of Hvosno remained under its jurisdiction, up to the abolition of the Patriarchate in 1766. During that period, the Eparchy of Hvosno was raised to the honorary rank of a Metropolitanate, and as such it is mentioned in written sources in 1473, 1566 and 1635. Metropolitan Victor of Hvosno is mentioned in 1635. During the Great Serbian Migrations at the end of the 17th century and during the first half of the 18th century, the Monastery became deserted and consequently dilapidated.

== Literature ==
- Bataković, Dušan T., ed. (2005). Histoire du peuple serbe [History of the Serbian People] (in French). Lausanne: L’Age d’Homme.
- Ćirković, Sima (2004). The Serbs. Malden: Blackwell Publishing.
- Đorđević, Života; Pejić, Svetlana, eds. (1999). Cultural Heritage of Kosovo and Metohija. Belgrade: Institute for the Protection of Cultural Monuments of the Republic of Serbia. ISBN 9788680879161.
- Ferrari, Silvio; Benzo, Andrea (2014). Between Cultural Diversity and Common Heritage: Legal and Religious Perspectives on the Sacred Places of the Mediterranean. London & New York: Routledge. ISBN 9781317175032.
- Fine, John Van Antwerp Jr. (1994) [1987]. The Late Medieval Balkans: A Critical Survey from the Late Twelfth Century to the Ottoman Conquest. Ann Arbor, MI: University of Michigan Press.
- Ivić, Pavle, ed. (1995). The History of Serbian Culture. Edgware: Porthill Publishers. ISBN 9781870732314.
- Janićijević, Jovan, ed. (1998). The Cultural Treasury of Serbia. Belgrade: IDEA, Vojnoizdavački zavod, Markt system. ISBN 9788675470397.
- Krstić, Branislav (2003). Saving the Cultural Heritage of Serbia and Europe in Kosovo and Metohia. Belgrade: Coordination Center of the Federal Government and the Government of the Republic of Serbia for Kosovo and Metohia. ISBN 9788675560173.
- Pavlovich, Paul (1989). The History of the Serbian Orthodox Church. Serbian Heritage Books. ISBN 9780969133124.
- Popović, Svetlana (2002). "The Serbian Episcopal sees in the thirteenth century" (PDF). Старинар. 51 (2001): 171–184.
- Smirnov, Sergej; Bošković, Đurđe (1936). "L'église de la Mère-de-Dieu de Hvosno". Старинар. 10–11 (1935–1936): 47–81.
- Sotirović, Vladislav B. (2011). "The Serbian Patriarchate of Peć in the Ottoman Empire: The First Phase (1557–94)" (PDF). Serbian Studies. 25 (2): 143–169. Archived from the original (PDF) on 10 August 2016.
- Subotić, Gojko (1998). Art of Kosovo: The Sacred Land. New York: The Monacelli Press. ISBN 9781580930062.
- Živković, Tibor; Bojanin, Stanoje; Petrović, Vladeta, eds. (2000). Selected Charters of Serbian Rulers (XII-XV Century): Relating to the Territory of Kosovo and Metohia. Athens: Center for Studies of Byzantine Civilisation.
