= 13 Themes for a Triskaidekaphobic =

Studio album by The Jeff Kaiser Ockodektet
- Released: 2003
- Recorded: September 7, 2002
- Venue: Ventura City Hall, Ventura, California
- Genre: Avantgarde; Free Improvisation; Jazz
- Length: 73:03
- Label: pfMENTUM
- Producer: Jeff Kaiser

The Jeff Kaiser Ockodektet chronology
17 Themes for Ockodektet (2002)	13 Themes for a Triskaidekaphobic (2003)	The Alchemical Mass/Suite Solutio (2004)

13 Themes for a Triskaidekaphobic is a live album by The Jeff Kaiser Ockodektet, released in 2003 on pfMENTUM – CD013.

Track Listing
No.	Title	Length
1.	"My Uncle Toby’s Apologetical Oration"	6:57
2.	"Gravity Was An Errant Scoundrel"	5:55
3.	"This Sweet Fountain Of Science"	8:44
4.	"The Curate’s Folly Betwixt Them"	5:47
5.	"Devout, Venerable, Hoaryheaded Man, Meekly Holding Up A Box"	4:43
6.	"The Stranger’s Nose Was No More Heard Of"	1:18
7.	"Uncle Toby Understood The Nature Of A Parabola"	4:01
8.	"The Accusing Spirit Which Flew Up To Heaven’s Chancery"	6:55
9.	"A Thousand Of My Father’s Most Subtle Syllogisms"	7:23
10.	"His Life Was Put In Jeopardy By Words"	5:44
11.	"The Heat And Impatience Of His Thirst"	5:16
12.	"Nothing But The Fermentation"	4:11
13.	"I Wish My Uncle Toby Had Been A Water-drinker"	6:09
Total length:		1:13:03

== Credits ==
Acoustic Guitar [Prepared] – Ernesto Diaz-Infante
Alto Saxophone – Jason Mears
Conductor, Trumpet, Composed By, Arranged By, Recorded By, Mastered By, Design, Layout – Jeff Kaiser
Contrabass – Hal Onserud, Jim Connolly
Drums – Billy Mintz, Richie West
Electric Guitar – Tom McNalley
Electric Guitar, Electronics – G.E. Stinson
Euphonium, Valve Trombone – Eric Sbar
Flute [Flutes] – Emily Hay
Organ, Theremin, Electronics – Wayne Peet
Percussion – Brad Dutz
Percussion, Drums [Drum Set] – Richie West
Saxophone [Saxophones], Clarinet [Clarinets] – Lynn Johnston
Saxophone [Saxophones], Clarinet [Clarinets], Flute [Flutes] – Vinny Golia
Soprano Saxophone, Tenor Saxophone – Eric Barber
Trombone – Michael Vlatkovich
Trumpet – Dan Clucas, Kris Tiner
Tuba – Mark Weaver
