= Patkovo =

Medieval county of Serbia

Patkovo was a medieval county (župa) of the Grand Principality of Serbia in modern-day southern Kosovo, encompassing the territories surrounding the cities of Gjakova and Prizren east of the White Drin (the region of Metohija). Historically, Patkovo was a Byzantine division until the conquest of Stefan Nemanja during the late 12th-century (circa 1170s-1190s, before the battle of Morava).

== See also ==
- List of regions of Serbia
- Hvosno
