= Vrsinje =

Coordinates: 42.6400204°N 18.3921432°E

Vrsinje (Serbo-Croatian: Врсиње, Latin: Versigne, Versigna) was a medieval župa, at times part of the Kingdom of Serbia, the Kingdom of Bosnia, and briefly, as a nahiya of the Ottoman Empire. It was a county in the land of Travunija. After the Ottoman conquest, it was replaced by the Zupci.

== Geography, economy and culture ==
Vrsinje was located on the way from Trebinje (now in Bosnia and Herzegovina) to Herceg Novi (now in Montenegro), above Konavle (now in Croatia). It bordered the counties of Trebinje, Vrm, Konavle and Dračevica. It included the settlement of Mrcine (which Jireček identified as Vrsinje itself, known as Mrcine since the 16th century), now known as Dubravka, in Konavle. Jireček's identification of Mrcine as Vrsinje itself was proved false, as Mrcine was mentioned already in 1423 and 1427 in boundary settlements of Konavle lands. A larger size of Vrsinje is apparent from its often mention alongside Trebinje and Konavle.

According to Jireček, there were dense forests around Vrsinje (now without traces) from which planks were sold in Ragusa (Dubrovnik), Konavle and the Bay of Kotor. From Vrsinje and Konavle meat, especially salted pork (prosciutto), leather, horns, wool and cheese was exported to Ragusa. In 1310, two individuals from Vrsinje migrated to the Republic of Ragusa to work as servants.

Vrsinje was inhabited by warlike shepherds. The Dobrašinović was a lesser noble family from Vrsinje, mentioned in the first half of the 15th century; Vukosav Dobrašinović was mentioned between 1426 and 1433 several times in Ragusan documents, while Tomaš Dobrašinović was mentioned in 1439. Names of people from Vrsinje are recorded in documents; examples include 14th-century Rajko Milatković or Milatović (1376), and 15th-century Radut Radosalić (1416), Vukosav Dobrašinović (1426–33), Vukman Bogavčić (1426), Pribio Bogavčić (1429), Petko Radosalić (1432), Radonja Paskačević (1434), Radohna and Ostoja Radosalić (1438), "Vatoyl" and "Butor Cranchouigh" (1438), Tomaš Dobrašinović (1439), Dobrovoj Branojević, Branko Dobrovojević, Hranko Jirojević, Vukac Milatović, Rogušin Milošević, Vukša Pribilović, Boroje, Branko Dobrojević, and Dobroslav Stanojević. Bosnian linguist Asim Peco noted that almost all names of individuals from Vrsinje were Serb.

== History ==
Vrsinje was an old county of the province of Travunija.) It was located in the eastern part of its territory. It was held by the medieval Serbian state until the late 14th century. It was held by magnates Nikola Altomanović until 1373, then Đurađ I Balšić until 1377, after which it was taken by Tvrtko I of Bosnia, during the Fall of the Serbian Empire.

Bosnian magnate Sandalj Hranić received southern Konavle and its city Sokol in 1392, and also held Vrsinje (as mentioned in 1424). In the 1440s, there were frequent flights from Trebinje, Vrsinje and Dračevica into Ragusan territory. After Bosnian king Stephen Thomas and the Serbian despot reconciled, the Republic of Ragusa proposed a league against the "Duke of St. Sava", Stjepan Vukčić Kosača. In 1451, King Stephen Thomas ceded over the counties of Vrsinje and Dračevica to Ragusa. The Ragusans were allowed to raise castles in the ceded territory. Thomas' charter from 18 December 1451 also included the obligation that he would attack Stjepan Vukčić Kosača, but the ceding was only theoretical, as Duke Stjepan firmly held those territories.

During the period of the Duchy of St. Sava, Vrsinje changed hands several times from the Duchy to the Ottomans, and from the Ottomans back to the Duchy. Vrsinje was held by the Ottomans already in September 1465. Ottoman subaşi are present in Vrsinje on 17 April and 20 August 1466, while Vlachs shepherd community of Zupci, as jurisdictio Turcorum, are present there on 7 October 1466. As seen from the Ottoman defter of 1475–77, the Zupci nahija replaced Vrsinje. The Zupci had earlier been mentioned as a family or people part of Vrsinje; in 1403 as "homo de Versigna Xubeç", in 1421 as "de Versigne de genere Zubaç", in 1466 as "de Versigne Vlachos Xubci sic dictos". The tribe of Zupci replaced the name of Vrsinje. On 28 January 1501, a new vojvoda of Novi, Vrsinje and Trebinje is mentioned; this is the last time Vrsinje is mentioned as an administrative unit.

== Sources ==
- Atanasovski, Veljan (1979). Pad Hercegovine. Istorijski Institut. pp. 13, 47, 71, 117, 118.
- Božić, Ivan (1952). Дубровник и Турска у XIV и XV веку. Научна књига. pp. 119, 120, 190, 207.
- Ćirković, Sima; Mihaljčić, Rade (1999). Лексикон српског средњег века (in Serbian). Knowledge. ISBN 9788683233014.
- Dunić, Mihailo (1967). Les Familles nobles de Hum et de Trebinje ... Académie serbe des sciences et des arts. pp. 53, 76, 77.
- Jireček, Josif Konstantin (1951). Trgovački drumovi i rudnici Srbije i Bosne u srednjem vijeku. Svjetlost.
- Kurtović, Esad (2009). Радосалићи - примјер "једнократних презимена" средњега вијека. Istorijski institut Beograd. p. 23. GGKEY:WUKYQDYP46L.
- Peco, Asim (1987). Iz jezičke teorije i prakse. Naučna knj.
- Rudić, Srdjan (2006). Властела Илирског грбовника: The Nobility of the Illyric Coat of Arms. Istorijski institut Beograd. p. 107. ISBN 978-86-7743-055-9.
- SKA (1925). Spomenik Srpske kraljevske akademije. Vol. 62–67. U Državnoj štampariji Kraljevne Srbije.
- Vego, Marko (1957). Naselja bosanske srednjevjekovne države. Svjetlost.
