= Golia, Ganjam =

Coordinates: 19.759°N 84.828°E

Golia
- Rural area

- Map of Odisha
- Country: India
- State: Odisha
- District: Ganjam
- Elevation: 13 m (43 ft)

Population
  - Total: 4,688(as per 2,001 Census)
- Time zone: UTC+05:30 (IST)
- Postal code: 761118
- Telephone code: 06818
- ISO 3166 code: IN-OR
- Vehicle registration: OR-07/OD-07
- Nearest city: Brahmapur, Buguda
- Literacy: 74.04%
- Official languages: Oriya

Golia is a village located in the Ganjam District of the Indian state of Odisha. It is governed by a panchayat, which also governs several nearby villages. The village is famous for the large number of turtles in Nelia Pond beside the temple of Shiva. Golia is 76 kilometres (47 mi) from the city of Brahampur and 159 kilometres (99 mi) from the state capital, Bhubaneswar.

== Climate ==
Golia has a tropical wet and dry climate. Temperature in the summer season (March–July) is often close to 35 °C (95 °F), and maximum temperatures often exceed 40 °C (104 °F) between April and June. However, winter lows are around 10 °C (50 °F).

== Demographics ==
According to the 2001 Census of India, the population of Golia was 4688, consisting of 2312 males and 2376 females. The literacy rate of Golia is 74.45%, which is slightly higher than the National average of 74.04%. As of 2011, the total number of voters in the village was 3121. Golia is 70 kilometres (43 mi) away from the Brahampur, and 30 kilometres (19 mi) away from the town of Asika, which is famous for its sugar factory. It is surrounded by Polasara Tehsil to the south, Jagantha Prasad Tehsil to the north, Bellaguntha Tehsil to the west, and Bhanjanager Tehsil to the east. Its neighboring villages are Chirikipada, Kusapali, DahaniPali, Saturusola, Mareyapali, Mala, Lembhu Bagicha, and Badua. The village is very dependent on towns such as Buguda, Polasara, Aska, Chatrapura, Berhampur, Purusotampur, and Jaganath Prasad.

=== Education ===
Golia is an education hub for nearby villages, which stretch from Mareyepoli and Kusapali to Kuanala. Multiple students from neighboring villages attend schools in the village to learn and improve their future prospects. Several educational organizations are present in the village:

- Golia Primary School
- Nua Sahi Sarkari Prathamika Vidayalya
- Upendra Bhanja ME School
- Sri Kanta Swamy Tapobana High School.
  Golia SKST High School

Golia's Anganwadi Kendra childcare center plays a major role in raising awareness of the value of children's education in the village. Parents are encouraged to allow their children to participate in extra-curricular activities. Thus, some children move to nearby towns like Buguda, Polasara, and Asika for a better education and to study English.

=== Sources of income ===
There are no industries currently in this area, and most families are farmers. Golia is known for its fertile soil and agricultural productivity. Most people in the village depend greatly on their land and gardens. Farmers are dependent on rain-fed agriculture and climate sensitive variables. Varieties of crops such as rice, dal, sugar cane, oil seed, mung, and biri are cultivated by farmers. People who want to make more money often leave the village for better opportunities. Industrial cities like Surat (known as "The Diamond City"), which is known for implementing child labour to process rough Conflict Diamonds from Africa, and Mumbai (known as "The Dream City") are two common destinations for the people of Golia.

Local and state government workers are also present in the village, including teachers, civil servants (such as police officers and people employed in the army, air force, or navy), doctors, nurses, and pharmacists.

== See also ==
- List of constituencies of Odisha Vidhan Sabha
- Oriya language
