= Plav (České Budějovice District) =

- Municipality
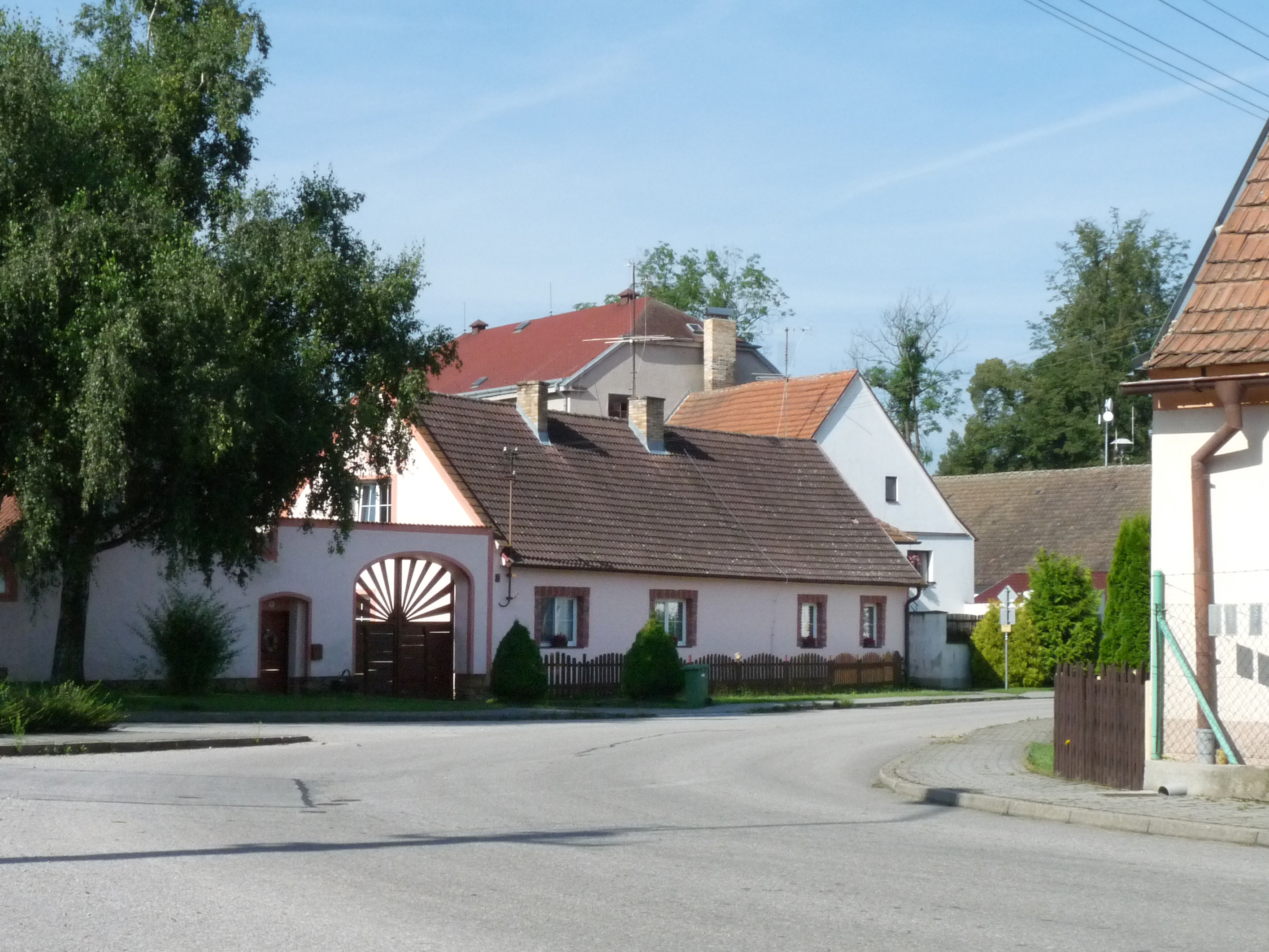
- Centre of Plav

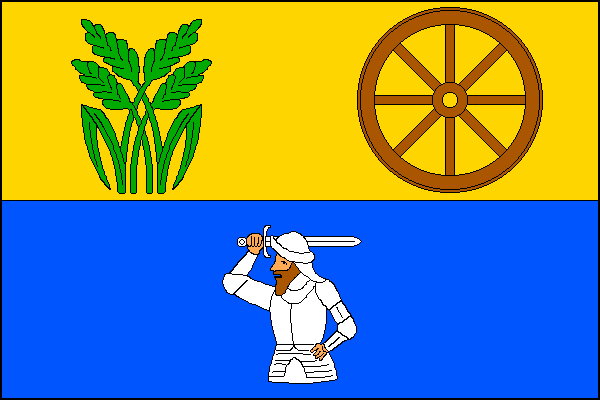
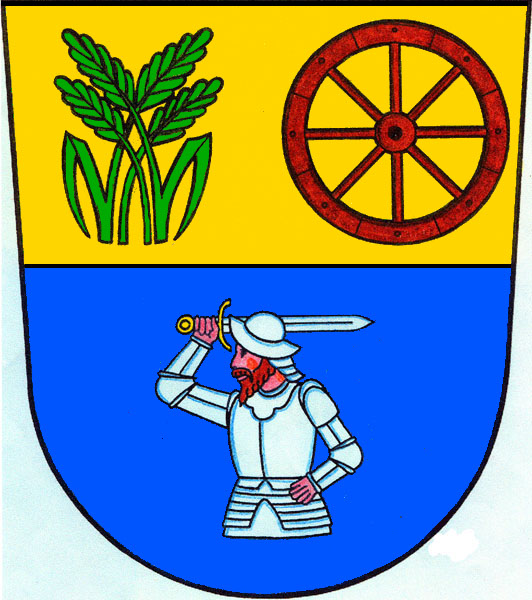
- Flag Coat of arms

- Location in the Czech Republic
- Coordinates: 48°54′5″N 14°29′16″E
- Country: Czech Republic
- Region: South Bohemian
- District: České Budějovice
- First mentioned: 1259

Area
  - Total: 5.11 km^{2} (1.97 sq mi)
- Elevation: 406 m (1,332 ft)

Population (2026-01-01)
  - Total: 438
  - Density: 85.7/km^{2} (222/sq mi)
- Time zone: UTC+1 (CET)
  - Summer (DST): UTC+2 (CEST)
- Postal code: 370 07
- Website: www.plav.cz

Plav (German: Plaben) is a municipality and village in České Budějovice District in the South Bohemian Region of the Czech Republic. It has about 400 inhabitants.

Plav lies approximately 9 kilometres (6 mi) south of České Budějovice and 132 km (82 mi) south of Prague.

== Demographics ==
Historical population
Year	Pop.	±%
1869	206	—
1880	243	+18.0%
1890	238	−2.1%
1900	257	+8.0%
1910	267	+3.9%
1921	289	+8.2%
1930	325	+12.5%
1950	238	−26.8%
1961	212	−10.9%
1970	209	−1.4%
1980	200	−4.3%
1991	206	+3.0%
2001	282	+36.9%
2011	397	+40.8%
2021	440	+10.8%
Source: Censuses
