= Rod Poole =

British guitar player

Rod Poole (born January 4, 1962, in Taplow, England; died May 2007 in Los Angeles, CA) was a British guitar player who released several acclaimed albums of acoustic guitar in just intonation and was an active and respected musician in the Los Angeles experimental music community before his untimely death. He was murdered in 2007 in a road rage incident. LA Weekly described Poole's music as:

"unlike any solo-guitar record you’ve ever heard: two long, unbroken series of cyclical, intricately interwoven patterns of notes — the dizzyingly rapid, tumbling arpeggios rolling on smoothly without letup, but subtly varying and changing themes, timbres and dynamics organically, evoking a gull shifting its wings in flight. It’s beautiful and expansive, with an occasional off-sounding note to keep total prettiness at bay and to remind you that Poole plays in “just intonation,” an ancient tuning system often containing more notes than we’re used to hearing in Western music. And it’s all improvised."

Poole began his musical career in England before moving to the United States in 1989, where he studied just intonation with Erv Wilson and became active in the Los Angeles improvised and experimental music scenes. Poole played a modified 1972 Martin Acoustic, rebuilt with a new fretboard to accommodate a 23-note octave of his own design. Nels Cline described Poole as "a true artist, probably a genius." His music was reviewed positively in Alternative Press, CMJ, Halana, and elsewhere, and his death was covered in Signal to Noise, The Wire, Los Angeles Times, and The Guardian.

== Selected discography ==
- 1996 - The Death Adder (WIN Records) solo acoustic guitar
- 1998 - December 96 (WIN Records) solo acoustic guitar
- 1998 - Iasis (Transparency) solo acoustic guitar
- 2001 - Acoustic Guitar Trio (Incus) with Nels Cline and Jim McAuley
- 2005 - Rod Poole & Sasha Bogdanowitsch - Mind's Island (Justguitar Records) guitar and vocal duets
- 2009 - Acoustic Guitar Trio – Vignes (Long Song Records) with Nels Cline and Jim McAuley
