= The Alchemical Mass/Suite Solutio =

Studio album by Jeff Kaiser
- Released: 2004
- Recorded: February 25, 2001 – April 26, 2003
- Venues: First United Methodist Church in Ventura, California; Zircon Skye in Ojai, California
- Genre: Avant-garde
- Length: 53:21
- Label: pfMENTUM
- Producer: Jeff Kaiser

The Jeff Kaiser Ockodektet chronology
13 Themes for a Triskaidekaphobic (2003)	The Alchemical Mass/Suite Solutio (2004)	132350 (2021)

The Alchemical Mass/Suite Solutio is a live album by The Jeff Kaiser Ockodektet with The Ojai Camerata, and The Kaiser/Diaz-Infante Sextet, released in 2004 by pfMENTUM.

== Track listing ==
The Alchemical Mass
No.	Title	Length
1.	"The Jeff Kaiser Ockodektet with The Ojai Camerata - Introitus"	10:28
2.	"The Jeff Kaiser Ockodektet with The Ojai Camerata - Kyrie"	3:00
3.	"The Jeff Kaiser Ockodektet with The Ojai Camerata - Collecta And Gloria"	2:33
4.	"The Jeff Kaiser Ockodektet with The Ojai Camerata - Epistola And Graduale"	1:44
5.	"The Jeff Kaiser Ockodektet with The Ojai Camerata - Offertorium"	9:03
6.	"The Jeff Kaiser Ockodektet with The Ojai Camerata - Ave Maria And Commune"	7:16

Suite Solutio
No.	Title	Length
7.	"Kaiser/Diaz-Infante Sextet - Part I"	2:38
8.	"Kaiser/Diaz-Infante Sextet - Part II"	1:25
9.	"Kaiser/Diaz-Infante Sextet - Part III"	5:06
10.	"Kaiser/Diaz-Infante Sextet - Part IV"	5:49
11.	"Kaiser/Diaz-Infante Sextet - Part V"	4:19
Total length:		53:21

== Credits ==
Acoustic Guitar [Prepared] – Ernesto Diaz-Infante
bass – Jim Connolly
Conductor – Dr. Wyant Morton (tracks: 1 to 6), Jeff Kaiser (tracks: 1 to 6)
Design, Layout, Composed By, Arranged By – Jeff Kaiser
Drums – Richie West
Ensemble – The Ojai Camerata (tracks: 1 to 6)
Flugelhorn – Jeff Kaiser (tracks: 1 to 6)
Mixed By, Mastered By – Jeff Kaiser (tracks: 7 to 11)
Percussion – Brad Dutz
Photography – Michael Kelly Recorded By – Jeff Evans (2) (tracks: 7 to 11)
Recorded By, Mixed By, Mastered By – Wayne Peet (tracks: 1 to 6)
Trombone – Michael Vlatkovich (tracks: 1 to 6), Scot Ray (tracks: 7 to 11)
Trumpet, Flugelhorn – Jeff Kaiser (tracks: 7 to 11), Kris Tiner (tracks: 1 to 6) Tuba – Mark Weaver
Voice [Alto] – Gwen Erickson (tracks: 1 to 6), Holly Mitchem (tracks: 1 to 6), Katherine Halsey (tracks: 1 to 6), Lisa Gordon (tracks: 1 to 6), Zoe Pietrycha (tracks: 1 to 6)
Voice [Bass] – Bill Wagner (tracks: 1 to 6), Dave Farber (tracks: 1 to 6), Jim Halverson (tracks: 1 to 6), Kurt Meyer (tracks: 1 to 6)
Voice [Soprano] – Candace Delbo (tracks: 1 to 6), Diane Besocke (tracks: 1 to 6), Eleanor Land (tracks: 1 to 6), Laura Johnson-Bickford (tracks: 1 to 6), Lu Setnicka (tracks: 1 to 6)
Voice [Tenor] – Carla Aiello (tracks: 1 to 6), J.B. White (tracks: 1 to 6), Jaye Hersh (tracks: 1 to 6)
Wind [Wood] – Eric Barber (tracks: 1 to 6), Jason Mears (tracks: 1 to 6), Vinny Golia (tracks: 1 to 6)

== Notes ==
The Alchemical Mass was recorded 4.26.03 at the First United Methodist Church in Ventura, CA

Suite Solutio was recorded 2.25.01 at Zircon Skye in Ojai, CA.
