= Uška =

Medieval administrative unit in Serbia

Uška was a medieval župa (small administrative division) of Serbia in modern-day southeastern Serbia. It encompassed the territories around the Nišava and Vlasina rivers east of Glbočica (modern-day Leskovac).
