= Blagaj =

Blagaj may refer to:

== Places ==
- Blagaj, Mostar (Blagaj on the Buna), a village near Mostar, Bosnia and Herzegovina
- Blagaj Fort, a medieval fortress near Mostar
- Blagaj, Donji Vakuf, a village in Bosnia and Herzegovina
- Blagaj, Kupres, a village in Bosnia and Herzegovina
- Blagaj, Japra (Blagaj on the Sana), a village near Bosanski Novi, Bosnia and Herzegovina
- Blagaj, Rijeka, a village near Bosanski Novi, Bosnia and Herzegovina
- Blagaj, Croatia (Blagaj on the Korana), a village near Slunj, Croatia
- Blagaj Castle (Croatia), a ruined castle on the Korana, Croatia

== People ==
- Blagaj family, a Croatian, Austrian and Slovenian noble family, cadet branch of the Babonić family
- Rihard Blagaj (1786–1858) Slovene aristocrat and botanist
