= Sniježnica, Teočak =

Sniježnica
- Village
- Location within Bosnia and Herzegovina
- Coordinates: 44.5878°N 18.9544°E
- Country: Bosnia and Herzegovina
- Entity: Federation of Bosnia and Herzegovina
- Canton: Tuzla
- Municipality: Teočak

Area
  - Total: 1.47 sq mi (3.82 km^{2})

Population (2013)
  - Total: 1,690
  - Density: 1,150/sq mi (442/km^{2})
- Time zone: UTC+1 (CET)
  - Summer (DST): UTC+2 (CEST)

Sniježnica is a village in the municipality of Teočak, Bosnia and Herzegovina. It is located east of Sniježnica Lake.

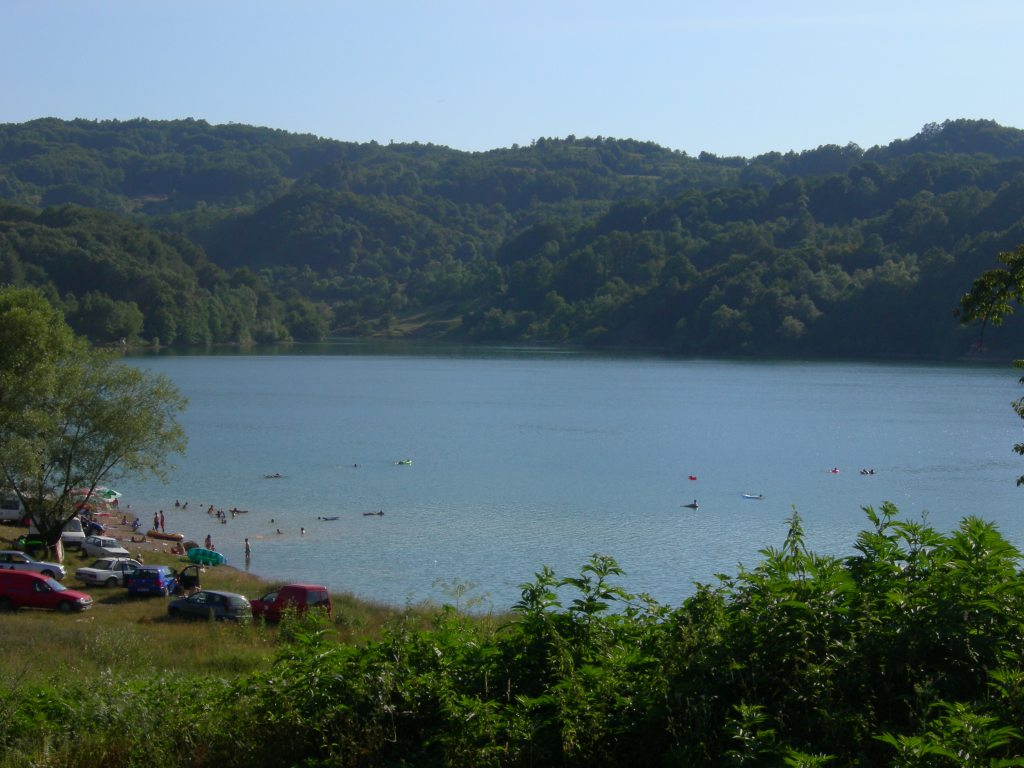
Sniježnica Lake

== Demographics ==
According to the 2013 census, its population was 1,690.

Ethnicity in 2013
Ethnicity	Number	Percentage
Bosniaks	1,684	99.6%
Croats	1	0.1%
Serbs	1	0.1%
other/undeclared	4	0.2%
Total	1,690	100%
