= Pečice (Příbram District) =

- Municipality
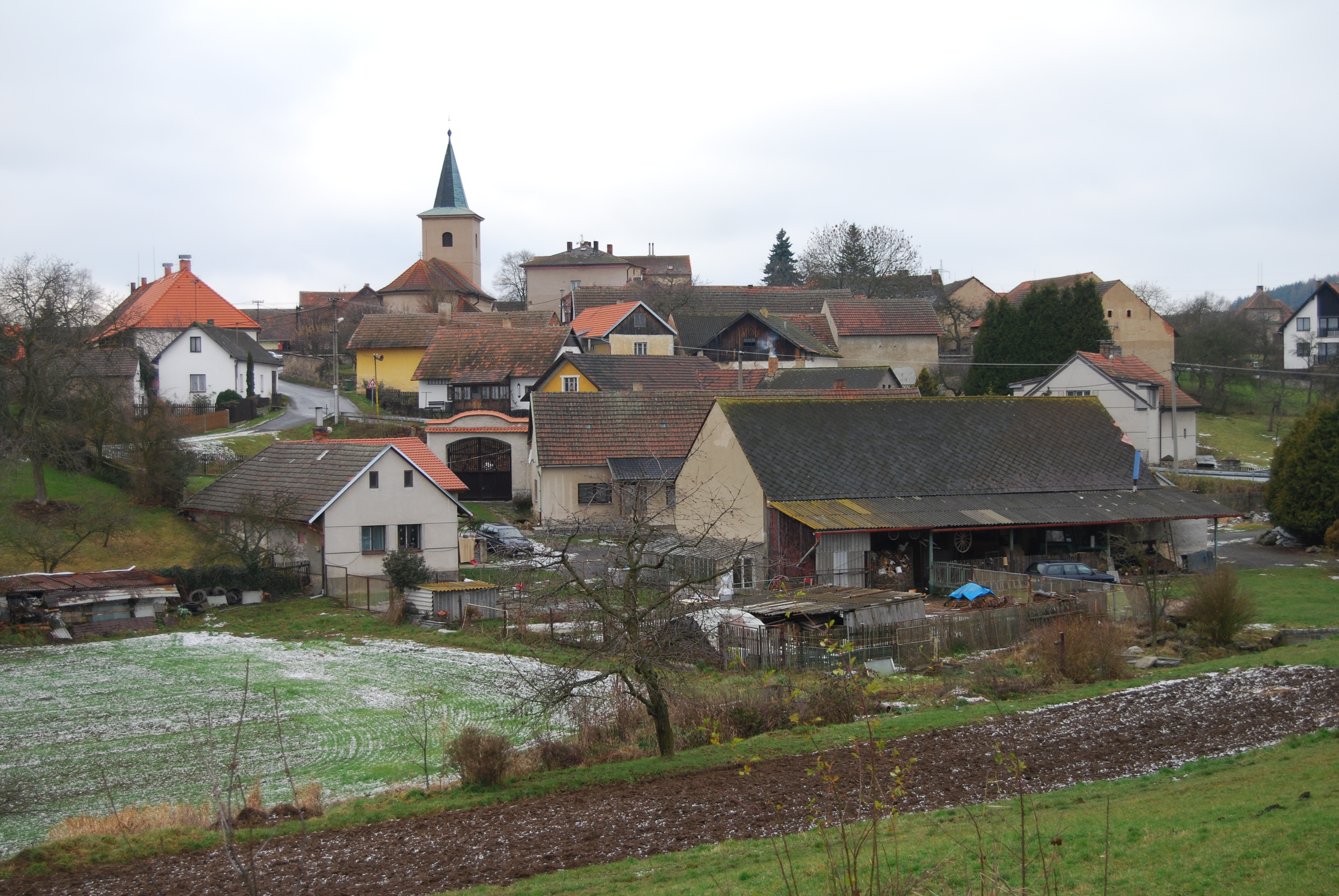
- General view

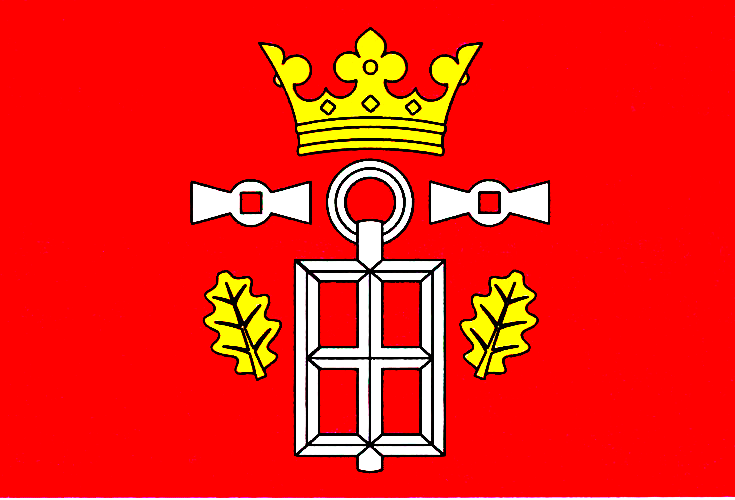
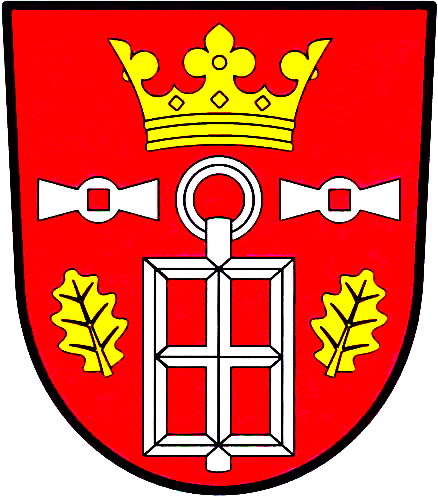
- Flag Coat of arms

- Location in the Czech Republic
- Coordinates: 49°36′2″N 14°6′20″E
- Country: Czech Republic
- Region: Central Bohemian
- District: Příbram
- First mentioned: 1336

Area
  - Total: 9.23 km^{2} (3.56 sq mi)
- Elevation: 504 m (1,654 ft)

Population (2026-01-01)
  - Total: 405
  - Density: 43.9/km^{2} (114/sq mi)
- Time zone: UTC+1 (CET)
  - Summer (DST): UTC+2 (CEST)
- Postal codes: 262 31, 262 32
- Website: www.pecice.cz

Pečice is a municipality and village in Příbram District in the Central Bohemian Region of the Czech Republic. It has about 400 inhabitants.

== Administrative division ==
Pečice consists of three municipal parts (in brackets population according to the 2021 census):

- Pečice (265)
- Drsník (33)
- Pečičky (94)

== Etymology ==
The name is derived from the personal name Pecka. The original name of the village was Pecčice, meaning "the village of Pecka's people".

== Geography ==
Pečice is located about 11 kilometres (7 mi) southeast of Příbram and 51 km (32 mi) southwest of Prague. It lies in the Benešov Uplands. The highest point is at 588 m (1,929 ft) above sea level. The stream Lišovický potok flows through the municipality. It supplies two fishponds in the area.

== History ==
The first written mention of Pečice is in a deed of King John of Bohemia from 1336. In the 17th century, it belonged to the Milín estate, then in the 18th century, it was part of the Karlštejn estate. The independent municipality was established in 1864.

== Demographics ==
Historical population

Year	Pop.	±%
1869	820	—
1880	828	+1.0%
1890	844	+1.9%
1900	792	−6.2%
1910	762	−3.8%

Year	Pop.	±%
1921	703	−7.7%
1930	662	−5.8%
1950	472	−28.7%
1961	508	+7.6%
1970	408	−19.7%

Year	Pop.	±%
1980	364	−10.8%
1991	341	−6.3%
2001	348	+2.1%
2011	348	+0.0%
2021	392	+12.6%

Source: Censuses

== Transport ==
There are no railways or major roads passing through the municipality.

== Sights ==
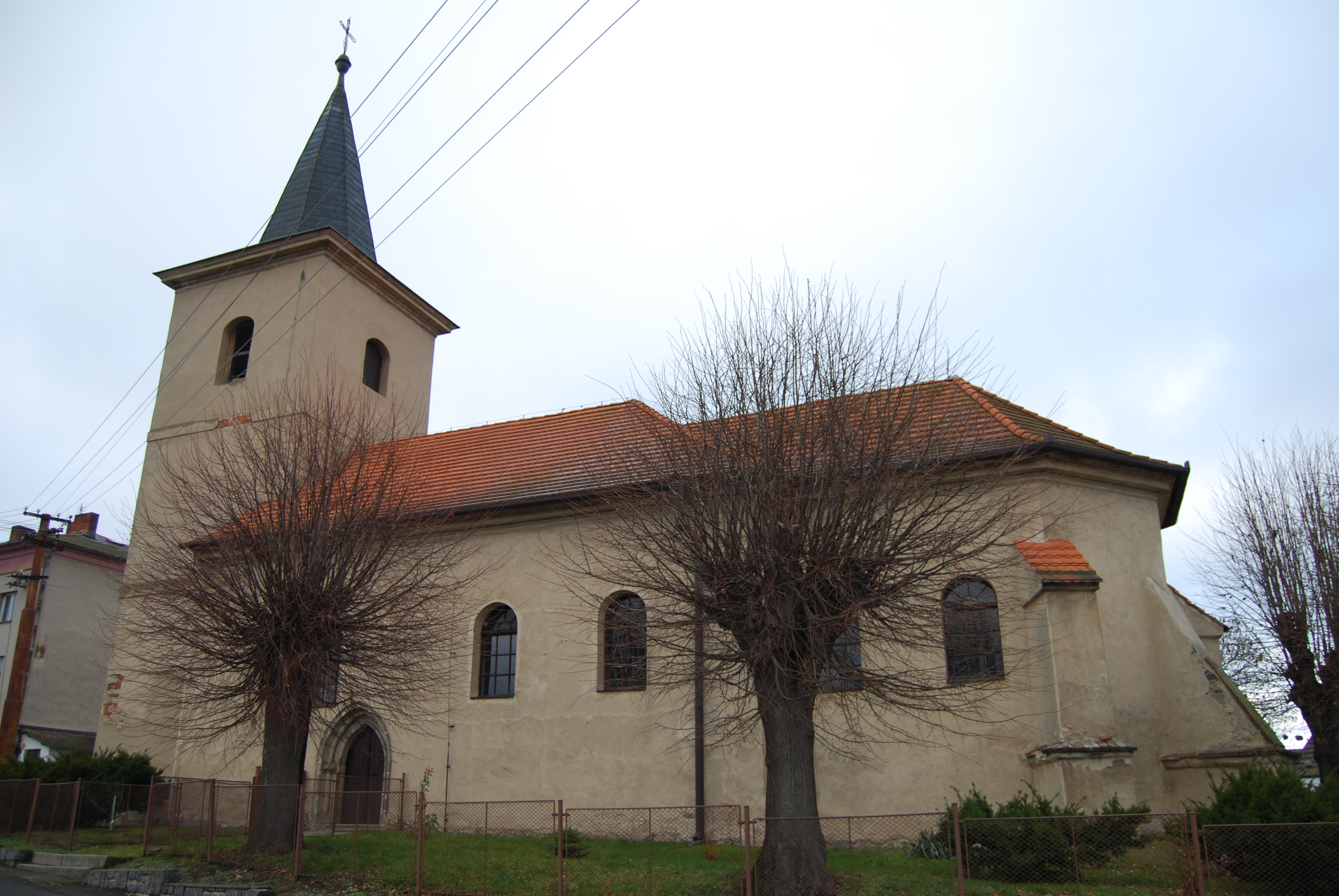
Church of Saint Lawrence

The main landmark of Chraštice is the Church of Saint Lawrence. It is an early Gothic church from the mid-13th century.
