= Golija =

Golija may refer to:

- Golija (Montenegro), a mountain in Montenegro
- Golija (Serbia), a mountain in southwestern Serbia
- Velika Golija, a mountain near Livno, Bosnia and Herzegovina

== See also ==
- Golija Moravica, a river in western Serbia
- Golijski Rzav, a river in southwestern Serbia
