= Plav (župa) =

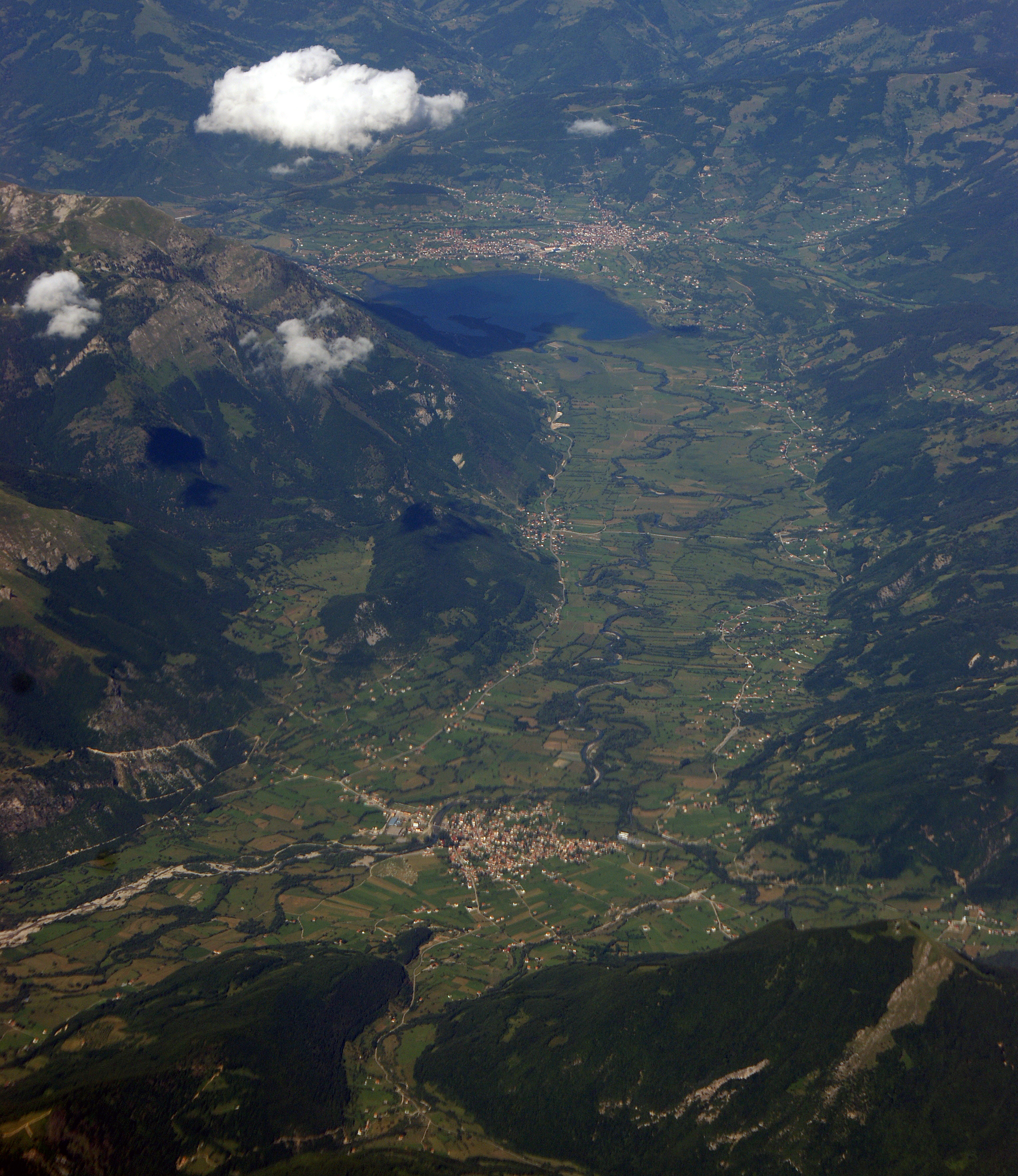
Lake Plav and the towns of Gusinje and Plav

Plav (Serbian Cyrillic: Плав) was a medieval county (župa) at the location of the modern town of Plav, Montenegro, in the area around the Lake Plav, where there are still ruins of the old fortified city. Its oldest mentions are from 1282 to 1298 and in 1330, when it was part of the Kingdom of Serbia. For some time it was ruled by Serbian Queen Helen of Anjou (fl. 1245–1309).
