= Vinny Golia =

American composer and multi-instrumentalist (born 1946)

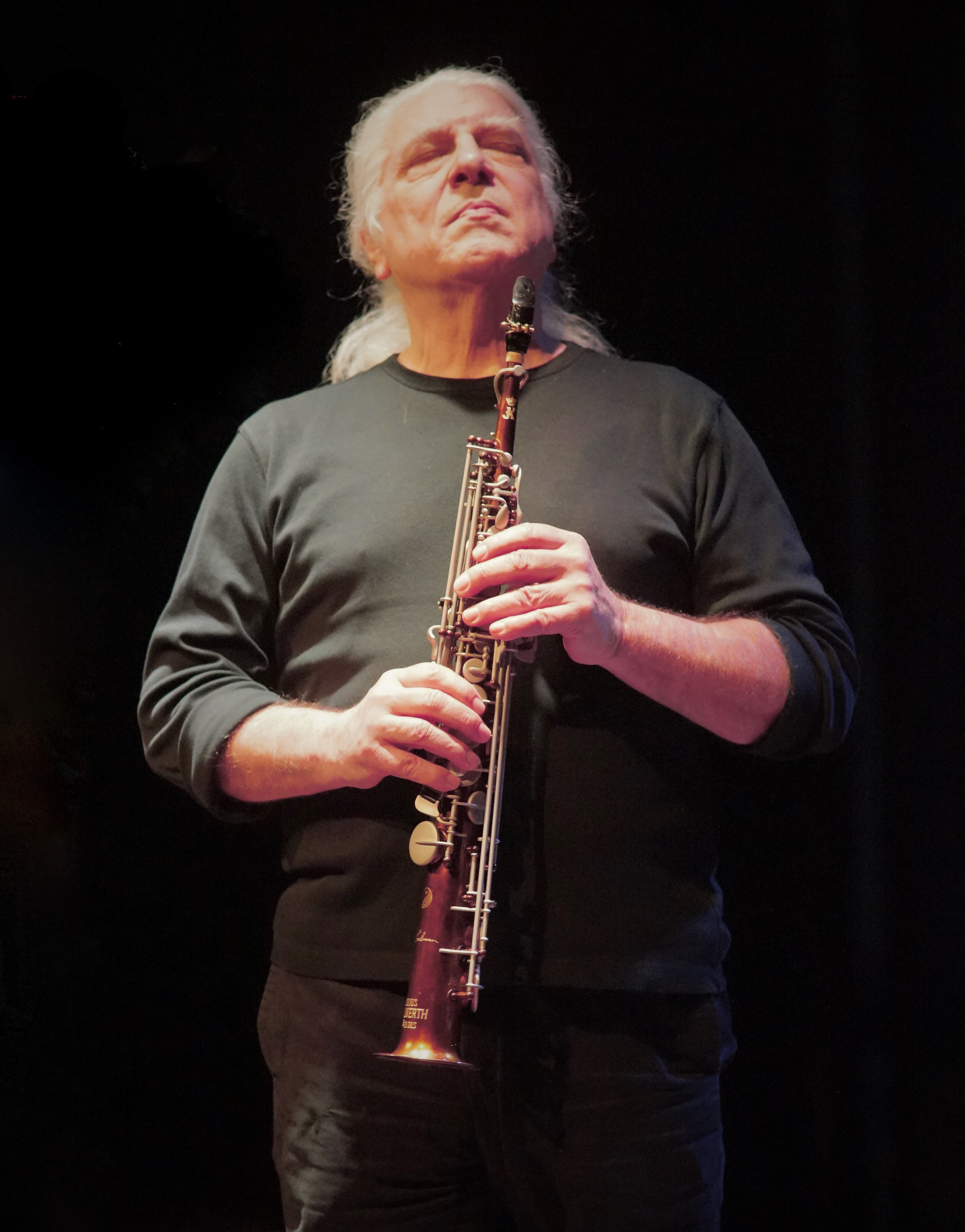

Background information
- Born: March 1, 1946 (age 80); Bronx, New York City, U.S.
- Genres: contemporary classical, world music, Jazz, avant-garde jazz, free jazz, free improvisation
- Occupations: Musician, composer, bandleader, record label founder
- Instruments: Woodwinds, saxophone, flute, English horn, clarinet, bassoon, tárogató
- Years active: 1977–present
- Labels: Nine Winds, Setola di Maiale, CIMP, I.R.S. Records
- Website: www.vinnygolia.com

Vincent James Golia, Jr. (b. the Bronx, New York, March 1, 1946) is an American composer and multi-instrumentalist specializing in woodwind instruments. He performs in the genres of contemporary music, jazz, free jazz, and free improvisation.

== Family background ==
Golia is of Italian heritage. His father was Vincent Golia Sr., and his mother was Lena Casella; they were both from Staten Island. He grew up in the Bronx and New Jersey.

== Career ==
As a composer, Golia fuses the rich heritage of jazz, contemporary classical music and world music. Also a bandleader, he has presented his music to concert audiences in Europe, Canada, Mexico, Japan, Australia, New Zealand and the United States in ensembles varying dramatically in size and instrumentation. Golia has won numerous awards as a composer, including grants from the National Endowment of the Arts, the Lila Wallace Commissioning Program, the California Arts Council, Meet the Composer, Clausen Foundation of the Arts, Funds for U.S. Artists and the American Composers Forum. In 1982, he created the ongoing 50-piece Vinny Golia Large Ensemble to perform his compositions for chamber orchestra and jazz ensembles.

A multi-woodwind performer, Golia's recordings have been consistently picked by critics and readers of music journals for their yearly "ten best" lists. In 1990, he was the co-winner of the JazzTimes TDWR award for Bass Saxophone. In 1998, he ranked 1st in the Cadence Magazine Writers & Readers Poll and has continually placed in the Down Beat Critics Poll for Baritone & Soprano Saxophone.

In 1999, he won the LA Weekly award for "Best Jazz Musician". Jazziz magazine has also named him as one of the 100 people who have influenced the course of jazz in the 21st century. In 2006, the Jazz Journalists Association honored him with a Lifetime Achievement Award. In 2013, he won the Down Beat Critics Poll in the "New Star" category for baritone saxophone.

Golia has been a featured performer with Anthony Braxton, Henry Grimes, John Carter, Bobby Bradford, Joëlle Léandre, Wadada Leo Smith, Horace Tapscott, John Zorn, Tim Berne, Bertram Turetzky, George E. Lewis, Barre Phillips, the Rova Saxophone Quartet, Patti Smith, Harry Gibson, Eugene Chadbourne, Kevin Ayers, Peter Kowald, John Bergamo, George Gruntz, Misha Mengelberg, Han Bennink, Lydia Lunch, and the Los Angeles Philharmonic Orchestra. Golia founded the jazz record label Nine Winds in 1977.

== Ensembles ==
Golia has a formed a number of ensembles that showcase both his style of composition and improvisation. These groups range from his Large Ensemble to a variety of mixed quintets, saxophone quartets, duos, sextets and arrangements for jazz and classical orchestras. Most recently, Golia has performed and toured with his sextet which features some of the new voices in the Los Angeles free-improv scene.

The group, composed of Gavin Templeton (alto sax), Daniel Rosenboom (trumpet), Alexander Noice (guitar), Andrew Lessman (drums) and Jon Armstrong (bass), has given performances at many of the premiere U.S. new music venues and festivals including Angel City Jazz Festival at the John Anson Ford Amphitheatre, the Outsound New Music Summit in San Francisco, and The Stone in New York.

== Discography ==
- 1977 Vinny Golia. Spirits in Fellowship (Nine Winds)
- 1978 Anthony Braxton. Creative Orchestra (Koln)1978 (hatART)
- 1979 Vinny Golia. Openhearted (Nine Winds)
- 1979 Vinny Golia Wind Quartet. Live at the Century City Playhouse - Los Angeles, 1979 (Dark Tree)
- 1979 The Vinny Golia Trio. ...In the Right Order... (Nine Winds)
- 1979 Tim Berne. The Five-Year Plan (Empire Productions)
- 1980 Vinny Golia. Solo (Nine Winds)
- 1980 Tim Berne. 7X (Empire Productions)
- 1980 Walter Thompson. Stardate (Dane Records)
- 1980 Roberto Miguel Miranda. The Creator's Musician (Nimbus West Records)
- 1981 The Vinny Golia Trio. Slice of Life (Nine Winds)
- 1981 The Vinny Golia Quintet. The Gift of Fury (Nine Winds)
- 1981 Roberto Miguel Miranda. Raphael (Nimbus West Records)
- 1982 The Vinny Golia Large Ensemble. Compositions for Large Ensemble (Nine Winds)
- 1984 Wayne Peet/ Vinny Golia Duo. No Reverse (Nine Winds Records)
- 1984 John Rapson. Deeba Dah-Bwee (Nine Winds)
- 1984 Michael Vlatkovich. 9113 (Thankyou Records)
- 1985 The Vinny Golia Quintet. Goin' Ahead (Nine Winds)
- 1985 Michael Vlatkovich/Charles Britt. Transvalue Book I (Thankyou Records)
- 1986 The Vinny Golia Large Ensemble. Facts of Their Own Lives (Nine Winds)
- 1986 Richard Grossman. One...Two...Three...Four... (Nine Winds)
- 1987 T.S.O.L. Thoughts of Yesterday (Posh Boy)
- 1988 The Steve Adams/Ken Filiano Quartet. Anacrusis (Nine Winds)
- 1989 The Vinny Golia Quintet. Out for Blood (Nine Winds)
- 1989 Vinny Golia Trio. Puff of Smoke (Altitude)
- 1989 The George Gruntz Concert Jazz Band. First Prize (Enja)
- 1990 John Rapson. Bing (Sound Aspects Records)
- 1990 Vinny Golia, The Chamber Trio. Worldwide & Portable (Nine Winds Records)
- 1990 Bertram Turetzky/Vinny Golia. Intersections (Nine Winds Records)
- 1990 The Vinny Golia Large Ensemble. Pilgrimage to Obscurity (Nine Winds)
- 1991 Richard Grossman and Friends. In The Air (Nine Winds Records)
- 1991 Various, Motion Picture EP. Blood and Concrete (A Love Story) (I.R.S. Records)
- 1992 Brad Dutz. Camels (Nine Winds)
- 1993 The Vinny Golia Large Ensemble. Decennium Dans Axlan (Nine Winds)
- 1993 The Vinny Golia Quintet. Against the Grain (Nine Winds)
- 1993 Mark Harvey & Aardvark Jazz Orchestra. The Aardvark Steps Out (Nine Winds)
- 1993 Bertram Turetsky. Compositions and Improvisations (Nine Winds)
- 1994 The Vinny Golia Large Ensemble. Commemoration (Nine Winds)
- 1994 The Vinny Golia Quintet. Regards From Norma Desmond (Fresh Sound)
- 1994 Rob Blakeslee Quintet. Long Narrows (Nine Winds)
- 1994 Rich Halley. Umatilla Variations (Nine Winds)
- 1995 The Vinny Golia Large Ensemble. Tutto Contare (Nine Winds)
- 1995 Vinny Golia/ Joelle Leadre/ Ken Filiano. Haunting the Spirits Inside Them... (Music & Arts)
- 1995 Vinny Golia Quintet. Razor (Nine Winds)
- 1995 Figure 8. Pipe Dreams (Black Saint)
- 1995 Kaoru. Welcome to Our Breakfast (Nine Winds)
- 1996 Vinny Golia, Bertram Turetzky. 11 Reasons to Begin (Music & Arts Programs of America Inc.)
- 1996 The Vinny Golia Quintet. Nation of Laws (Nine Winds)
- 1996 Vinny Golia & Ken Filiano. The Art of Negotiation (CIMP)
- 1996 John Carter, Andrea Centazzo, Vinny Golia, Gregg Goodman. USA Concerts West (New Tone Records)
- 1996 Gregg Bendian Project. Counterparts (CIMP)
- 1997 Vinny Golia, George Lewis, Bertram Turetzky. Triangulation (Nine Winds)
- 1997 The Vinny Golia Large Ensemble. Portland, 1996 (Nine Winds)
- 1997 The Aardvark Jazz Orchestra. An Aardvark Christmas (Nine Winds)
- 1997 Wadada Leo Smith. Prataksis (Nine Winds)
- 1997 Aardvark Jazz Orchestra. Psalms and Elegies (Leo Lab)
- 1997 William Parker & The Little Huey Creative Music Orchestra. Sunrise in The Tone World (AUM Fidelity)
- 1997 The Vinny Golia Quintet. Dante No Longer Repents (Music & Arts Programs of America Inc.)
- 1998 Steuart Liebig / Vinny Golia / Billy Mintz. No Train (Cadence Jazz)
- 1998 Susan Allen, Vinny Golia. Duets (Nine Winds)
- 1998 Vinny Golia. Lineage (Nine Winds)
- 1998 Vinny Golia, George Cremaschi, Garth Powell. Win This Time (Limited Sedition)
- 1998 Paul Smoker-Vinny Golia Quartet. Halloween, The Sequel (Nine Winds Records)
- 1998 Ed Harkins, Vinny Golia, Bertram Turetzky. Glossarium (Nine Winds Records)
- 1998 Steve Adams / Vinny Golia. Circular Logic (Nine Winds Records)
- 1998 The Rob Blakeslee Quartet. Spirit of The Times (Nine Winds)
- 1999 Jeff Kaiser Featuring Vinny Golia. Ganz Andere (pfMENTUM)
- 1999 Barre Phillips / Bertram Turetzky / Vinny Golia. Trignition (Nine Winds Records)
- 1999 The NOW Orchestra. Wowow (Spool)
- 1999 The Motor Totemist Guild. City of Mirrors (Cuneiform Records)
- 1999 Brad Dutz. Heat The Grill Cook Loin (Household Ink Records)
- 1999 Tim Berne. The Empire Box (Screwgun Records)
- 2000 The Vinny Golia Large Ensemble. The Other Bridge (Oakland 1999) (Nine Winds)
- 2001 Steuart Liebig / Vinny Golia / Billy Mintz. Antipodes (Cadence Jazz Records)
- 2001 Vinny Golia. Clarinet (Meniscus)
- 2001 Mark Trayle / Vinny Golia. Music for Electronics & Woodwinds (Nine Winds)
- 2001 Alex Cline Ensemble. The Constant Flame (Cryptogramophone)
- 2001 John Rapson. Water And Blood (The Billy Higgins Improvisations) (Nine Winds)
- 2003 Vinny Golia. Feeding Frenzy - Music For Woodwinds & String Quartet (Nine Winds)
- 2003 Vinny Golia. Music for Like Instruments: The Eb Saxophones (Nine Winds)
- 2004 The Jeff Kaiser Ockodektet. 13 Themes for a Triskaidekaphobic (pfMENTUM, 2003)
- 2004 Liebig / Vatcher / Golia. On The Cusp Of Fire And Water (Red Toucan Records)
- 2004 Lydia Lunch. Smoke In The Shadows (Breakin Beats)
- 2004 Vinny Golia. Music For Like Instruments; The Flutes (Nine Winds Records)
- 2004 Nels Cline / Vinny Golia. The Entire Time (Nine Winds Records)
- 2004 The Vinny Golia Quintet. One, Three, Two (Jazz Halo, Belgium)
- 2004 Peter A. Schmid / Vinny Golia. Birdology (Leo)
- 2004 Vinny Golia. A Gift for the Unusual: Music for Contrabass Saxophone (Nine Winds)
- 2004 Various. Morton Feldman Jazz Tributes (Villars Edition, 2004)
- 2004 The Jeff Kaiser Ockodektet with The Ojai Camerata/The Kaiser/Diaz-Infante Sextet. The Alchemical Mass/Suite Solutio (pfMENTUM)
- 2005 Vinny Golia. Music for Like Instruments: The Flutes (Nine Winds)
- 2005 Bert Turetzky. Tributes (Nine Winds)
- 2005 Vinny Golia. Music for Like Instruments: The Clarinets (Nine Winds)
- 2005 Vinny Golia Quartet. Sfumato (Clean Feed)
- 2005 Adam Lane Trio Feat. Vinny Golia and Vijay Anderson. Zero Degree Music (CIMP)
- 2006 Tim Hodgkinson. Sketch of Now (Mode)
- 2006 Various. The New US Concerts (Ictus)
- 2007 Michael Vlatkovich/Charles Britt. Transvalue Book III (Thankyou Records)
- 2007 Adam Lane Quartet. Buffalo (Cadence Jazz Records)
- 2007 Various. Healing Force: The Songs of Albert Ayler (Cuneiform)
- 2008 Vinny Golia. Music For Like Instruments:The Bb Saxophones (Nine Winds)
- 2009 Mooey Moobau. All Murmur of Our Mothers’ Waters and Live Bloody Live (Vosotros)
- 2009 Peter Kowald & Vinny Golia. Mythology (Kadima Collective)
- 2009 Bertram Turetzky, Vinny Golia. The San Diego Session (Kadima Collective)
- 2009 Anthony Braxton. Creative Orchestra (Koln) 1978 (hatOLOGY)
- 2009 Bobby Bradford Extet. Midnight Pacific Airwaves (Entropy Stereo)
- 2009 Vinny Golia / Damon Smith / Weasel Walter. Großes Messer (ugEXPLODE)
- 2010 Nels Cline. Dirty Baby (Cryptogramaphone)
- 2010 Vinny Golia, Mark Dresser. Live At Lotus (Kadima Collective)
- 2010 Brad Dutz – Vinny Golia. Duets
- 2010 Bert Turetzky / George Lewis / Vinny Golia. Triangulation II (Kadima Collective)
- 2010 The Weasel Walter Septet. Invasion (ug Explode)
- 2011 The Daniel Rosenboom Septet. Fallen Angeles (Nine Winds Records)
- 2011 Estamos Ensemble. Jimpani Kustakwa Ka Jankwariteecher (Edgetone Records)
- 2011 The Vinny Golia Sextet. Abstractions and Retrocausalities (Nine Winds Records)
- 2011 The Vinny Golia Octet. Low and Inside; (Close Call Anyway…) (Nine Winds Records)
- 2011 Rent Romus’ Lords Of Outland with Vinny Golia. Edge Of Dark (Edgetone Records)
- 2011 Vinny Golia. Lethologica (Experimental Music Yearbook)
- 2011 Vinny Golia Quartet. Take Your Time (Relative Pitch)
- 2011 Anthony Braxton. Orchestra (Paris) 1978 (Braxton Bootleg)
- 2012 Vinny Golia, Marco Eneidi, Lisa Mezzacappa, Vijay Anderson. Hell-Bent In The Pacific (NoBusiness Records)
- 2012 Scott Robinson, Vinny Golia, J.D. Parran, Warren Smith. Creative Music for 3 Bass Saxophones (ScienSonic)
- 2012 Vinny Golia Large Ensemble. Overview; 1996-2006 (NoBusiness Records)
- 2012 Ross Hammond Quartet. Adored (Prescott Recordings)
- 2012 Vinny Golia. The Ethnic Project (Kadima Collective Recordings)
- 2013 Ross Hammond Quartet. Cathedrals (Prescott Recordings)
- 2013 Alex Cline. For People In Sorrow (Cryptogramophone)
- 2013 Vinny Golia & Urs Leimgruber. Empiricism In The West (Relative Pitch Records)
- 2014 Ross Hammond w/ Catherine Sikora, Vinny Golia, Clifford Childers, Kerry Kashiwagi, Dax Compise. Humanity Suite (LP, Prescott Recordings)
- 2014 Weasel Walter, Various. Improvised Music Sampler 2014 (Weasel Walter)
- 2015 Brzytwa/ Golia. Brzytwa / Golia (LP, Setola di Maiale)
- 2015 Vinny Golia. At Gold Lion Arts
- 2016 Matty Harris. Double Septet (pfMENTUM)
- 2016 Vinny Golia And Ken Filiano. Elongation (pfMENTUM)
- 2016 Vinny Golia, Oliver Lake, Ross Hammond and Adam Lane. Live At The Downtown Music Gallery NYC
- 2016 Ross Hammond and Vinny Golia. Ross Hammond And Vinny Golia (Prescott Recordings)
- 2016 Ross Hammond Quartet. Live at The Blue Whale (Ross Hammond)
- 2017 Lisa Mezzacappa, Vinny Golia. Glorious Ravage (New World Records)
- 2017 Estamos Ensemble. suube tube (Edgetone Records)
- 2017 Vinny Golia. Intercommunications (Music For Woodwinds And Percussion) (pfMENTUM, Nine Winds Records)
- 2017 Vinny Golia. Music For Woodwinds, Strings, Piano, And Percussion (pfMENTUM, Nine Winds Records)
- 2017 Vinny Golia. Syncquistic Linear Expositions And Their Geopolitical Outcomes (...We Are Still Here...) (pfMENTUM, Nine Winds Records)
- 2017 Nathan Hubbard, Vinny Golia. Hunter's Moon (Castor & Pollux Music)
- 2017 John Tchicai, Vinny Golia, Bill Smith, Clyde Reed, Gregg Simpson. Du Maurier, Vancouver Jazz Festival, 1988 (Condition West Recordings)
- 2017 Vinny Golia Wind Quartet. Live at the Century City Playhouse - Los Angeles, 1979 (Dark Tree)
- 2018 Burrows, Campbell, Golia, Reed. Tales from The Zoo (Third Rail Music)
- 2018 Vinny Golia, Steph Richards, Bert Turetzky. Trio Music (pfMENTUM)
- 2018 The Vinny Golia Sextet.Trajectory (2 CD set, Ninewinds/Orenda Records)
- 2018 David Mott, Vinny Golia. Music for 2 Baritone Saxophones: "Have You Heard? (Pet Mantis Records)
- 2018 Vinny Golia, Henry Kaiser, Ra Kalam Bob Moses, Damon Smith, Weasel Walther. Astral Plane Crash (Balance Point Acoustics)
- 2018 Steve Adams/Vinny Golia Duo. The Philosophy of Air (pFmentum)
- 2018 Vinny Golia/Gianni Mimmo. Explicit (Ninewinds/Amirani Records)
- 2018 The Vinny Golia New Music Orchestra. Live at Redcat Los Angeles (DVD, Ninewinds/pFmentum)
- 2019 The Vinny Golia Quartet. Left, Outside...! (Nine Winds)
- 2019 Dan Clucas/Vinny Golia/Stuart Liebig/Alex Cline. Boojum Quartet (SR)
- 2019 Shiroishi / Golia / Fujioka / Cline. Borasisi (Astral Spirits)
- 2020 Vinny Golia, John Hanrahan, Henry Kaiser, Wayne Peet, Mike Watt.A Love Supreme Electric: A Love Supreme and Meditations (Cuneiform Records)
- 2021 Netty Ensemble.The Netty Sessions (Casa Berenice Recordings)
- 2021 Vinny Golia.Even to this day…Movement One: Inoculations Music for Orchestra and Soloists (Nine Winds/pfMENTUM)
- 2022 Vinny Golia, Matt Smiley, Ron Coulter. Effloresce (Kreating SounD)
- 2022 Vinny Golia, Matt Smiley, Ron Coulter. Refractories (Kreating SounD)
- 2023 Vinny Golia, Louis Lopez, Joshua Gerowitz, Matt Smiley, Ron Coulter. Shimmer (Kreating SounD)
- 2024 Vinny Golia, Matt Smiley, Ron Coulter. Vibratile (Kreating SounD)
- 2024 Vinny Golia, Louis Lopez, Joshua Gerowitz, Matt Smiley, Ron Coulter. Myriads (Kreating SounD)
- 2024 Vinny Golia & Ron Coulter. Duwos (Kreating SounD)
- 2025 Vinny Golia, Matt Smiley, Ron Coulter. Tunings (Kreating SounD)
- 2025 Vinny Golia & Ron Coulter. duwos toowos (Kreating SounD)
- 2025 Vinny Golia, Jeb Bishop, Sandy Ewen, Damon Smith, Ron Coulter. STL23 (Kreating SounD)
- 2025 Vinny Golia, Dan Clucas, Seth Andrew Davis, Kevin Cheli. "Orchid" (Mother Brain Records/Improvised Sound & Noise)

With Anthony Braxton

- Creative Orchestra (Köln) 1978 (hatART, 1978 [1995])

With Alex Cline

- For People in Sorrow (Cryptogramophone, 2013)

With George Gruntz

- First Prize (Enja, 1989)

With William Parker

- Sunrise in the Tone World (AUM Fidelity, 1997)

With Samo Salamon & Ra Kalam Bob Moses Orchestra

- Dream Suites Vol. 1 (Samo Records, 2025)

With CRAG (Chrsitian Asplund, Steven Ricks, Ron Coulter)

- Polychromy (pfMENTUM, 2021) PFMCD143
- Missouri Scream (Kreating SounD, 2024)

With SeFa LoCo (Bret Sexton, Farrell Lowe, Matt Smiley, Ron Coulter)

- Snarled (Kreating SounD, 2023)
- Dance & Decay (Right Brain Records, 2023)
- The Other One(s) (Kreating SounD, 2022)
- STRATA (Right Brain Records, 2026)

With Wadada Leo Smith

- Prataksis (Ninewinds, 1997)

With RACCA trio (Alex Nauman, Matt Smiley, Ron Coulter)

- Callinate (Nine Winds, 2025)
