= Harpoon (disambiguation) =

A harpoon is a long spear-like instrument used in fishing to catch fish or other aquatic animals such as whales.

Harpoon may also refer to:

== Games ==
- Harpoon (series), a series of air and naval combat simulator video games
  - Harpoon (video game), the first game in that series

== Military ==
- Harpoon (missile), an American anti-ship missile
- PV-2 Harpoon, an American anti-submarine aircraft
- Harpoon-3, a Russian anti-drone rifle
- FS-5000 HARPOON, a clandestine radio manufactured by AEG Telefunken

== Music ==
- Harpoon, a band that featured on the 1974 soundtrack of Little Malcolm
- Ezra Furman and the Harpoons, rock band
- Kid Harpoon (born 1982), English singer
- Harpoon (album), a 2005 album by Larkin Grimm
- Harpoon (Jebediah song), 1998
- "Harpoon" (Knife Party and Pegboard Nerds song), 2018
- "Harpoon", a song by Brecker Brothers from the 1994 album Out of the Loop
- "Harpoon", a song by Scott Henderson from the 1997 album Tore Down House

== Other uses ==
- Harpoon 6.2, a Canadian sailboat design
- Harpoon (comics), a Marvel comic book character, member of the Marauders
- Harpoon (1948 film), an American film
- Harpoon (2019 film), a comedy thriller film
- Reykjavik Whale Watching Massacre, also known as Harpoon, a 2009 Icelandic horror film
- The Harpoon, a satirical radio programme on BBC Radio 4 between 1991 and 1994
- Harpoon (hieroglyph), a single-point harpoon hieroglyph used as an Egyptian hieroglyph to mean 'single item'
- Harpoon reaction (or harpoon mechanism), a type of chemical reaction
- The symbol ⟨⇀⟩ representing a partial function in mathematics

== See also ==
- Harpoon Brewery, an American brewery
- Harpooned
- Harpooner (ship)
