= Harpooner (ship) =

Several ships have been named Harpooner:

- Harpooner (1769 ship) was launched at Whitby in 1769, or possibly a few years later. Her early career is obscure. She may have been a Greenland whaler between 1786 and 1792. She appeared in Lloyd's Register in 1801, and thereafter traded across the Atlantic. She was wrecked in 1816 with heavy loss of life.
- Harpooner (1771 ship) was launched at Liverpool in 1771. In 1778 she became a privateer. She captured at least two French merchantmen before a French privateer captured her in January 1780. She became the French privateer Comptesse of Buzanisis, which the Royal Navy recaptured. Harpooner returned to online records in 1782, and in 1783 became the slave ship Trelawney, which then made two complete voyages in the triangular trade in enslaved people. She was no longer listed after 1786.
- Harpooner was launched at Havana, c.1761. From 1781 to 1785 she was Salisbury (1781 ship). In 1785 she became the northern whale fishery whaler Rebecca. She became Harpooner in 1787. She was lost in 1789.
- Harpooner (1791 ship) was launched at Bristol. A French privateer captured her in 1793 on Harpooner's first whaling voyage to the southern whale fishery and took her into Boston. This gave rise to an important court case.
- Harpooner (1830 ship) was a barque built in London by Green, Wigram's & Green, at Blackwall. Between 1830 and 1848 she made four voyages as a whaler to the British southern whale fishery. The Hudson's Bay Company chartered her from 1848-1850 to carry labourers for the settlement on Vancouver Island. In August 1856 she was sailing from Amoy to Ningbo when she struck a sunken rock near Ningbo, China and was damaged. She was consequently condemned.
