= I Want to Work for Diddy =

2008 American TV program

- Country of origin: United States
- Original language: English
- No. of seasons: 2
- No. of episodes: 20

Production
- Executive producer: Sean Combs
- Camera setup: Hidden and Camera men
- Running time: 60 minutes

Original release
- Network: VH1
- Release: August 4, 2008 – January 4, 2010

I Want to Work for Diddy is a VH1 reality show which features contestants competing for a job working for Sean Combs (a.k.a. Diddy). The first season of the show tied for the Outstanding Reality Program at the 20th GLAAD Media Awards. The first season included Laverne Cox, an African American transgender woman, that helped launch her television career.

== Airing of the show ==
Season	Season premiere	Season finale	Winner	Runner up	Number of Contestants	Number of Episodes
Season One	August 4, 2008	October 6, 2008	Suzanne Siegel	Mike Barber	13	10
Season Two	November 2, 2009	January 4, 2010	Ebony Jones	Daniel Orrison	12^{[a]}	10

- ^{^[a]}There were 11 contestants, but later Kim "Poprah" Kearney from Season One returned and joined the competition.
