= Charlie Looker =

American musician

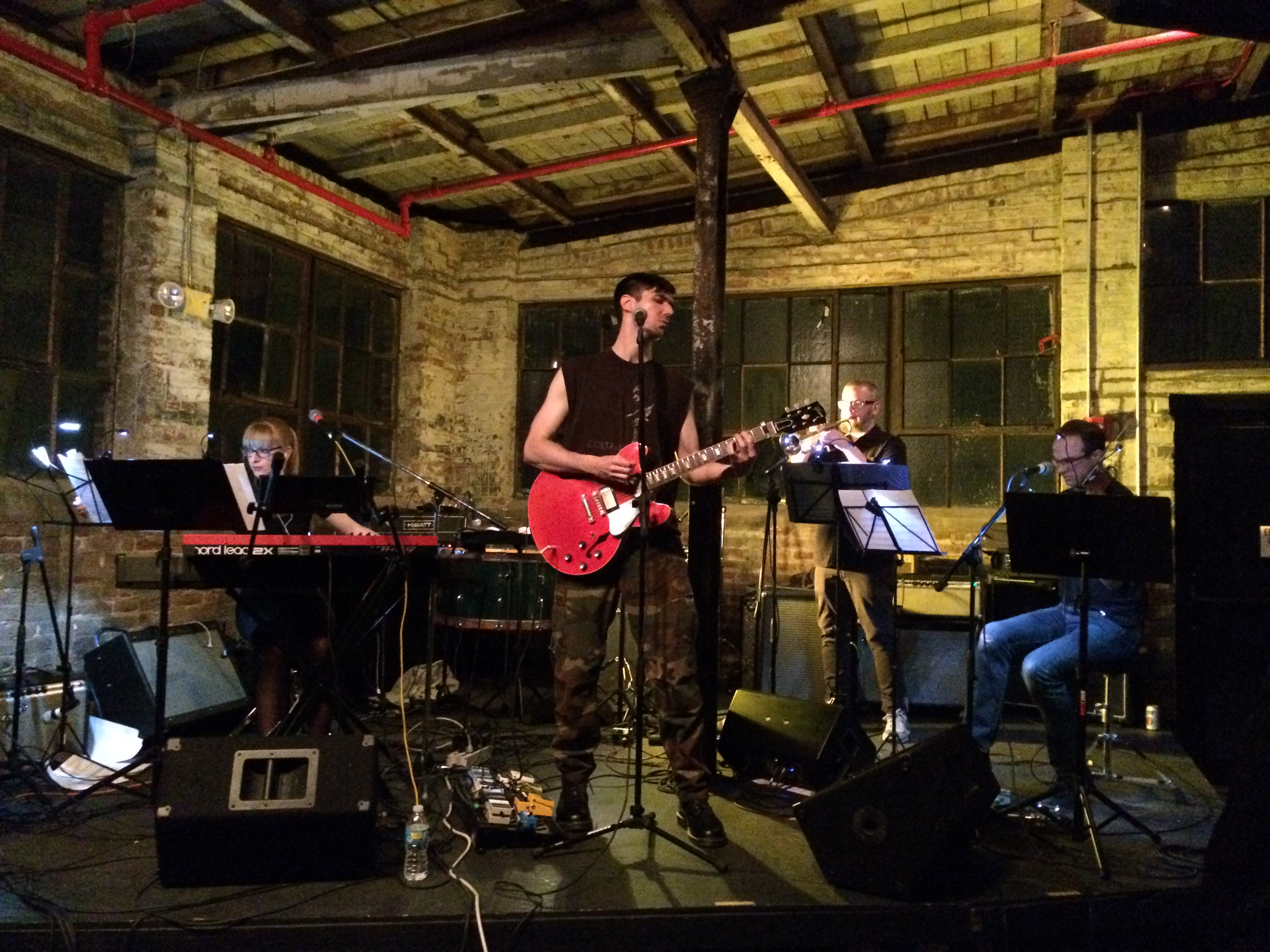
- The Charlie Looker Ensemble performing at Knockdown Center in Queens, 2017

Background information
- Born: Charles Andrew Looker; May 23, 1980 (age 45); New York City
- Instruments: Vocals; guitar; keyboards
- Labels: Northern Spy; Profound Lore; Last Things; Astral Spirits
- Member of: Extra Life
- Formerly of: Zs, Psalm Zero, Dirty Projectors
- Website: charlielooker.com

Charles A. Looker (born May 23, 1980) is an American composer, improviser, vocalist, and guitarist known for his work in experimental metal, contemporary classical, avant-jazz, and Renaissance and Medieval musical forms.

== Education and career ==
Looker is a graduate of Wesleyan University, where he studied with Anthony Braxton and Alvin Lucier.

Alongside his work as a solo artist, Looker also leads an Early/Renaissance-music inspired project, Seaven Teares; performs improvised "death-jazz" with Period, whose rotating cast includes Darius Jones, Chuck Bettis, and Mike Pride; played in Sculptress, a duo with Chuck Stern; and leads the industrial-metal duo Psalm Zero, formerly alongside Castevet's Andrew Hock. He is the songwriter, guitarist, and lead vocalist for avant-rock band Extra Life and a former member and co-founder of avant-garde band Zs. He worked with Dirty Projectors and appears on their record Rise Above. Other collaborators include M Lamar, Mariel Roberts, Ty Braxton, Mary Halvorson, Mick Barr, Tim Berne, Nat Baldwin, Earle Brown, Sam Mickens, Kelly Moran, Dax Riggs, Lingua Ignota, Matthew Welch, Stu Watson, William Parker, and Glenn Branca.

He founded Last Things Records, a label that has released recordings by Extra Life, Larkin Grimm, Parenthetical Girls, Psalm Zero, and Sculptress.

In 2011, Looker was named one of NPR Music's "Top 100 Composers Under 40".

== Discography ==
=== As leader ===
| Year | Artist | Title | Label |
|---|---|---|---|
| 2002 | Lavender | Get Your Eye | Newsonic |
| 2006 | Extra Life | Three-Song EP | FuckingA |
| 2008 | Extra Life | A Split (EP) | Shatter Your Leaves |
| 2008 | Extra Life | Secular Works | Planaria / I & Ear / LOAF |
| 2010 | Extra Life | Made Flesh | LOAF / Africantape |
| 2011 | Extra Life | Ripped Heart (EP) | Last Things |
| 2012 | Extra Life | Dream Seeds | Northern Spy |
| 2013 | Seaven Teares | Power Ballads | Northern Spy |
| 2014 | Psalm Zero | The Drain | Profound Lore |
| 2016 | Psalm Zero | Stranger to Violence | Profound Lore |
| 2018 | Charlie Looker | Simple Answers | Last Things |
| 2019 | Nothing Human | [Five Bandcamp singles] | |
| 2020 | Psalm Zero | Sparta | Last Things |
| 2020 | Charlie Looker | Pleasures Of A Normal Man | Last Things |
| 2020 | Seaven Teares | Older Than Love | |
| 2022 | Extra Life | Secular Works, Vol. 2 | Last Things |
| 2024 | Extra Life | The Sacred Vowel | Last Things |

=== As co-leader ===
| Year | Artist | Title | Label |
|---|---|---|---|
| 2000 | Daniel Carter / Charlie Looker / Greg Stare | Light | Aristocracy Communication |
| 2003 | Zs | Zs | Troubleman Unlimited |
| 2005 | Zs | Buck | Folding Cassettes |
| 2005 | Zs | Karate Bump (EP) | Planaria |
| 2006 | PERIOD | PERIOD | FuckingA |
| 2006 | Seductive Sprigs | Seductive Sprigs | FuckingA |
| 2007 | Zs | Arms | Planaria |
| 2008 | Zs | The Hard (EP) | Three One G |
| 2011 | Sculptress | Cuckold | Last Things |
| 2012 | Zs | The Complete Sextet Works 2002-2007 | Northern Spy |
| 2014 | PERIOD | PERIOD 2 | Public Eyesore |
| 2021 | Jeremiah Cymerman / Charlie Looker | A Horizon Made of Canvas | Astral Spirits |

=== As sideperson ===
| Year | Artist | Title | Label |
|---|---|---|---|
| 2002 | Alvin Lucier | Vespers and Other Early Works | New World Records |
| 2002 | Matthew Welch | Ceol Nua | Leo Records |
| 2005 | Mike Pride | Scrambler | Not Two Records |
| 2006 | Earle Brown | Folio and Four Systems | Tzadik |
| 2007 | Dirty Projectors | Rise Above | Dead Oceans |
| 2016 | Tredici Bacci | Amore Per Tutti | NNA |
| 2017 | M Lamar | Surveillance Punishment and the Black Psyche | Negrogothic |
| 2021 | Xiu Xiu | OH NO | Polyvinyl |
| 2023 | Xiu Xiu | Ignore Grief | Polyvinyl |
