= The Last Tree =

The Last Tree may refer to:

- The Last Tree (album), a 2006 album by Larkin Grimm
- The Last Tree (film), a 2019 British film
