= Bryce Hackford =

American musician

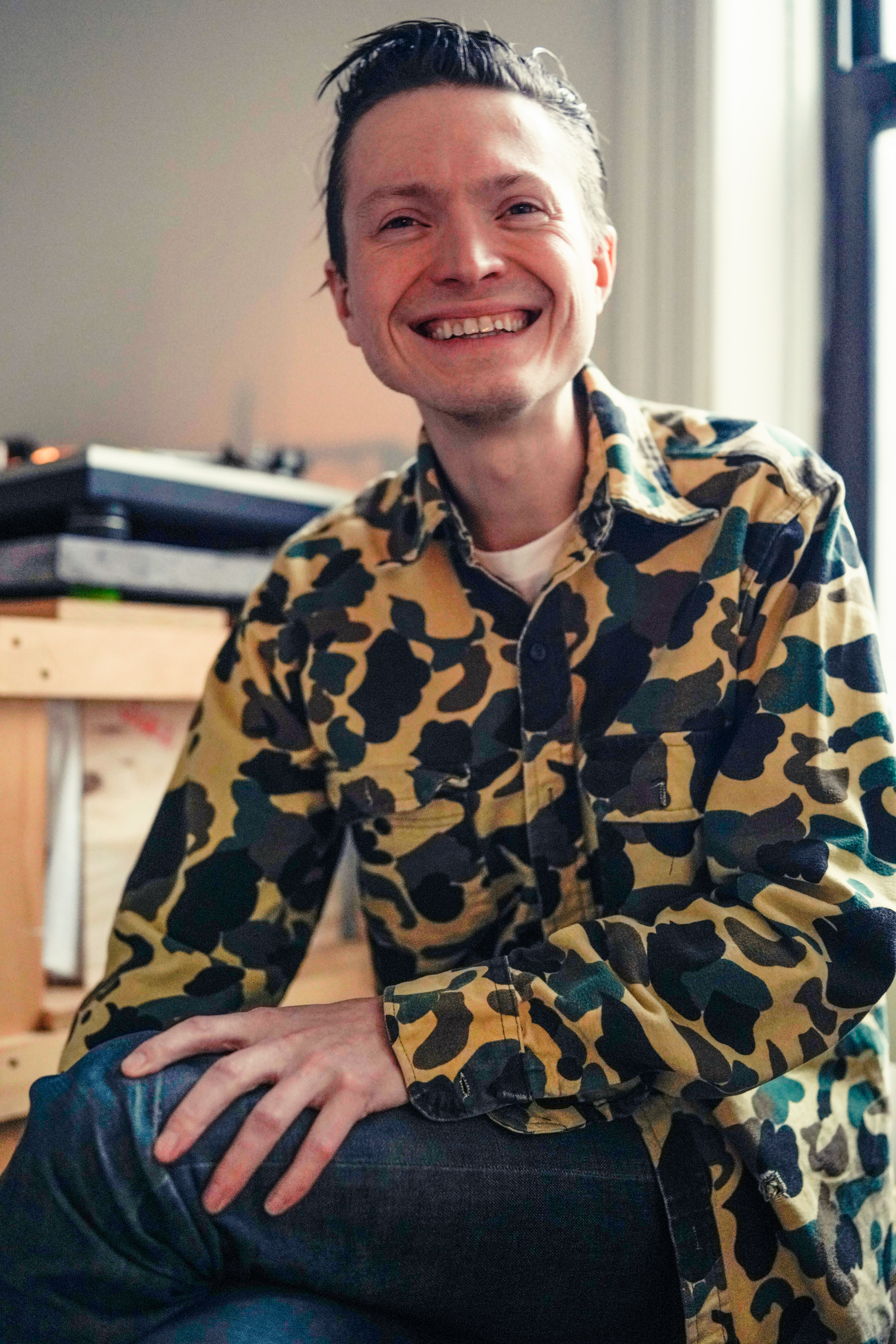
- Hackford in 2020
- Born: Bryce Hackford

Bryce Hackford is an American musician based in Brooklyn.

== Career ==
In 2008, Hackford co-founded the post-punk band Behavior. Formed from longstanding connections in Long Island's music scene, the band consisted of Hackford (vocals/guitar/synth/effects), Ian Campbell (bass), and Khira Jordan (drums). The band was characterized by its fusion of experimentalism with pop sensibilities.

In 2013, Hackford released his debut solo album Fair. The album is based on material he developed in Europe in 2011 where by using a small field recorder, a synth, a sampler and a microphone, he recorded improvised songs that would later became the basis for the album. The album featured "Another Fantasy", described by Pitchfork as “a supremely grimy wall-pounder”.

In 2013, Hackford was the sound designer for M Lamar's Surveillance Punishment and The Black Psyche, an examination of "the sexual politics surrounding the surveillance of the black male body".

In 2014, Hackford collaborated with dancer and choreographer Brittany Bailey on a series of performances titled “Light Dance with Girl” at Judson Church, NADA Art Fair, and the Williamsburg Art and Historical Center.

In 2014, Hackford collaborated with experimental cellist Oliver Coates on a split EP which featured a Coates cover of "Another Fantasy" “pulling all manner of gnarled and ragged sounds” from his cello, and “looping and multi-tracking them into a chugging, almost-dancefloor-ready track”.

In December 2014, Hackford released the mini-album Amnesia on PRAH Recordings. The label described it as “raw, sampladelic tracks and different explorations of repetition”.

In 2015, Hackford released the album Behind.

In 2015, Hackford made four remixes for the album release of In Remembrance by Delia Gonzalez. On April 12, 2015, Hackford, Alice Cohen, Adrian Knight, and David Lackner joined Gonzalez at the Museum of Modern Art to play a live score for four of her ballet films.

In April 2018, Hackford and Brian Allen Simon performed as part of Commend Here, a series of one-off performances at Commend, a space operated by the Brooklyn-based label RVNG Intl.

In 2018, Hackford performed with Delia Gonzalez at the List Visual Arts Center at MIT. The performance, which featured music from her 2017 album Horse Follows Darkness, was part of the exhibition List Projects: Delia Gonzalez which displayed drawings, sculpture, and a sound work.

In 2020, Hackford released Safe (Exits). It was described by Pitchfork as an "appealingly loose, rangy record" that's "suited to his magpie tendencies".

In 2021, a remix by Peak Wifi, a project between Hackford and Parquet Courts member Austin Brown, was featured on the B-side of Parquet Courts physical-only single titled Plant Life.

Hackford is currently enrolled in the Bard College MFA program in Music/Sound.

== Discography ==
=== Albums ===
- Fair (PRAH, 2013)
- Amnesia (PRAH, 2014)
- Behind (Meakusma, 2015)
- Looking Off (Perfect Wave, 2017)
- Safe (Exits) (Spring Theory, 2020)
- Cloud Holding (Futura Resistenza, 2022)
