= M Lamar =

American composer, performer, and artist

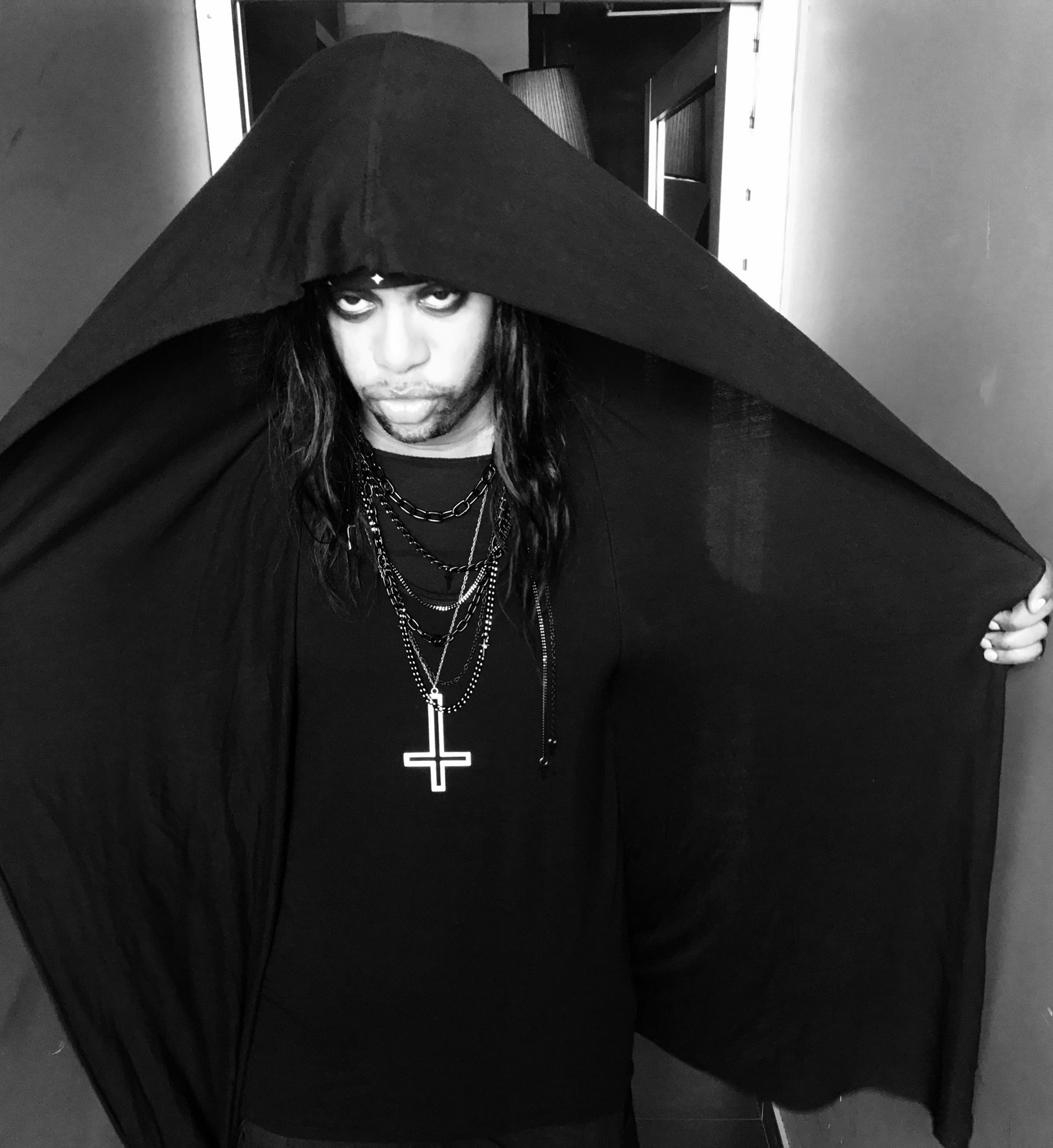
- Lamar in 2017
- Born: May 29, 1972 (age 54); Mobile, Alabama, U.S.
- Education: San Francisco Art Institute; Yale University
- Occupations: Composer; performer; multimedia artist
- Relatives: Laverne Cox (twin sister)
- Musical career
- Instruments: Vocals; piano
- Website: mlamar.com

M Lamar (born May 29, 1972) is an American composer, performer, and artist. He is an operatic countertenor and pianist whose work incorporates film, sculpture, installation, and performance.

Lamar is the twin of actress Laverne Cox, and played his sister's character pre-transition in two episodes of the Netflix show Orange Is the New Black.

== Early life and career ==
Lamar was born in Mobile, Alabama, and as a child he sang as a soprano in his church's choir. He studied painting at the San Francisco Art Institute and attended Yale for graduate school in sculpture before dropping out to focus on music. He moved to New York primarily to pursue vocal training with Ira Siff, founder and lead soprano of La Gran Scena Opera Company.

In 2014, Lamar participated in an open dialogue with authors bell hooks, Marci Blackman, and Samuel R. Delany called "Transgressive Sexual Practice" as part of hooks’ work as scholar-in-residence at The New School. He has cited the writing of hooks and Toni Morrison, as well as operatic composer Diamanda Galás’s Plague Mass, as inspirations for his work.

One Archive and the University of Southern California commissioned Lamar's Funeral Doom Spiritual, which premiered in 2016 as both a performance and multimedia installation with objects, videos, and prints. The work is loosely based on the life and death of Willie Francis, a Black American charged with having murdered a 53-year-old white man at the age of 15; Francis's case only received significant attention when he survived an attempted execution by electric chair, after which the NAACP spoke with him and learned the two had been in a sexual relationship. This event led to further development of Funeral Doom Spiritual, which had its conceptual origins in Lamar's studies of representations of blackness, black masculinity, interracial desire, and the intersection of Michel Foucault’s work on the panopticon with Frantz Fanon’s writings on internalized racism and the white gaze.

In 2016, Lamar received a grant from the Jerome Foundation to compose the work Lordship and Bondage: The Birth of the Negro Superman for the Living Earth Show. The work's libretto includes quotes from John Coltrane, Sun Ra, Ornette Coleman, Cecil Taylor, Nietzsche, and Hegel.

Lamar coined the terms "Negrogothic" and "doom spirituals" to describe his aesthetics and work. Exceeding his own "goth" style, Lamar says the Negrogothic "circulates horror genres with colonial-racial questions" and is "about horror and romance together, the condition of black people in the American project." These rhetorical innovations are related to his valuing "self-construction", specificity, and illegibility as means of preventing the reduction and appropriation of African American art.

In 2022, Lamar appeared on the ABC show Claim to Fame under the pseudonym "X". He was eliminated in the third episode when his celebrity relative was guessed.

== Discography ==
Year	Title	Label	Additional Personnel
2010	Souls on Lockdown	NEGROGOTHIC RECORDS	
2013	Speculum Orum: Shackled To The Dead		with Bryce Hackford (synths, tape loops), Matthew Robinson (cello)
2015	Negrogothic		
2017	Funeral Doom Spiritual	NEGROGOTHIC	
2017	Surveillance Punishment and the Black Psyche	NEGROGOTHIC	with Mivos Quartet (Olivia De Prato, Lauren Cauley, Victor Lowrie, Mariel Roberts) featuring Charlie Looker, Colin Marston, Cum Gutter, Bryce Hackford
2019	Lordship and Bondage: The Birth of the Negro Superman		Co-composed and performed with The Living Earth Show (Travis John Andrews & Andy Meyerson)
2020	M. Lamar Live		with Haela Hunt-Hendrix, James Ilgenfritz's Anagram String Trio

== See also ==
- LGBT culture in New York City
