= Patrick Higgins (musician) =

American avant-garde composer, guitarist, and producer

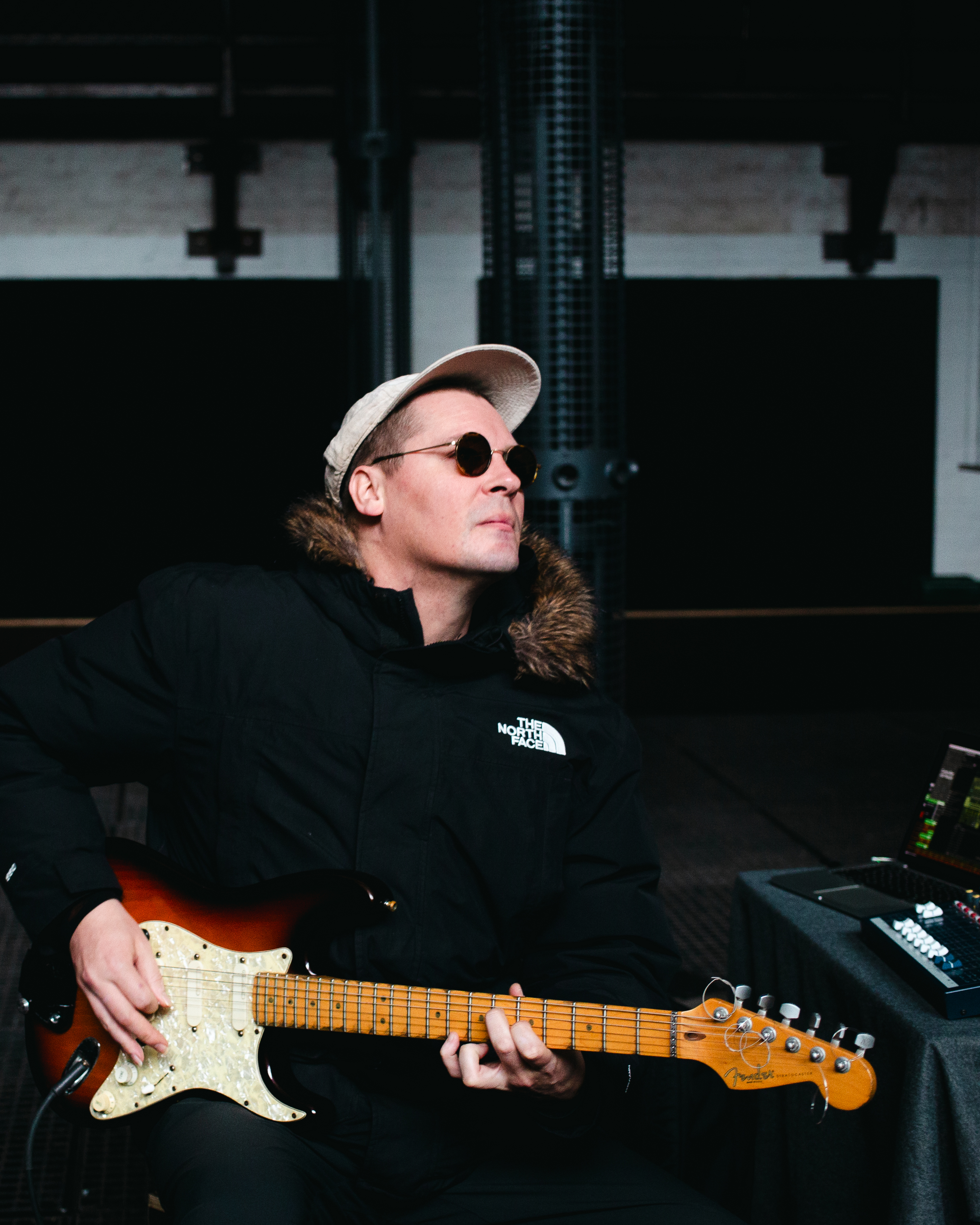
- Patrick Higgins at MONOM Studio in Berlin.

Background information
- Origin: New York, New York
- Genres: experimental, classical, noise, improvisation
- Occupations: composer, guitarist, producer
- Years active: 2004–present
- Labels: Other People, Northern Spy, NNA Tapes, Telegraph Harp, Unfun Records
- Website: Official Site

Patrick Higgins is an American avant-garde composer, guitarist, and producer from New York City, known for his work in experimental and contemporary classical music. Higgins plays guitar and composes in Zs, described by The New York Times as "one of the strongest avant-garde bands in New York." Heralded as a "formidable concert music composer" and "one of the most gifted guitarists working today", Higgins has received attention for bridging traditions including baroque chamber music, contemporary noise, and 20th century minimalism.

== Early life and career ==
Higgins was born in 1984 in Manhattan and attended high school at the Urban School of San Francisco. He returned to New York City in 2002 to attend Columbia University, earning a B.A. in Philosophy and an M.A. in Comparative Literature.

In 2004, Higgins and Alexander Perrelli formed the duo project Animal. They released their eponymous debut on Unfun Records in 2006, with a second release, the Archaeopteryx split Horror Orr, following a year later. In 2007, Higgins recorded an album of video game-inspired music titled Monkey Mountain (ELE Records, 2012).

== Music ==
In 2012, Higgins joined a new trio configuration of long-running New York ensemble Zs, touring with the group across 20 countries. The first Zs record to feature Higgins was Grain, released on Northern Spy in 2014. Higgins co-composed, produced, and played guitar for Zs' 2015 album Xe, the band's most critically acclaimed record to date. Xe was praised by publications including The Wall Street Journal, Pitchfork, and Rolling Stone, which included the album in its Best Avant-Garde Records of 2015. The album and artwork for Xe were purchased by the SF MOMA and are part of the museum's permanent collection.

As a composer, Higgins often uses his own work as raw material for further experimentation. In 2013, Ex Cathedra Records released a double LP of Higgins' String Quartet No.2, featuring Mivos Quartet, along with Glacia, an electronic re-composition of the quartet performance. Higgins furthered the concepts informing Glacia on 2015's Social Death Mixtape (NNA), this time presenting remixes of his own compositions without the untreated source materials (which included unreleased works for harpsichord, string ensemble, and guitar). Tiny Mix Tapes gave the album's "forays into avant-noise-classical-electronics" 4 out of 5 stars.

Higgins composed the score for the feature film As You Are (dir. by Miles Joris-Peyrafitte), which was awarded the prestigious Special Jury Prize at the 2016 Sundance Film Festival. He premiered Hyperborea, a work for string orchestra and live electronics, at the 2017 Le Guess Who? Festival in Holland. The piece was performed by the Netherlands Philharmonic Orchestra and included a new arrangement of Renaissance composer Carlo Gesualdo's "Tenebrae Responsories" for strings.

One of Higgins' best-known solo works is Bachanalia (Telegraph Harp, 2015) a record of electronically processed classical guitar arrangements of Johann Sebastian Bach. Heralded as a "flawlessly-performed" "masterpiece", Bachanalia solidified Higgins' reputation as among the most innovative guitarists of his era. September 2017 saw the release of a collaborative recording called "EVRLY MVSIC", released on NNA Tapes. The record featured semi-improvised acoustic duets of Higgins on guitar and violinist Josh Modney of the International Contemporary Ensemble.

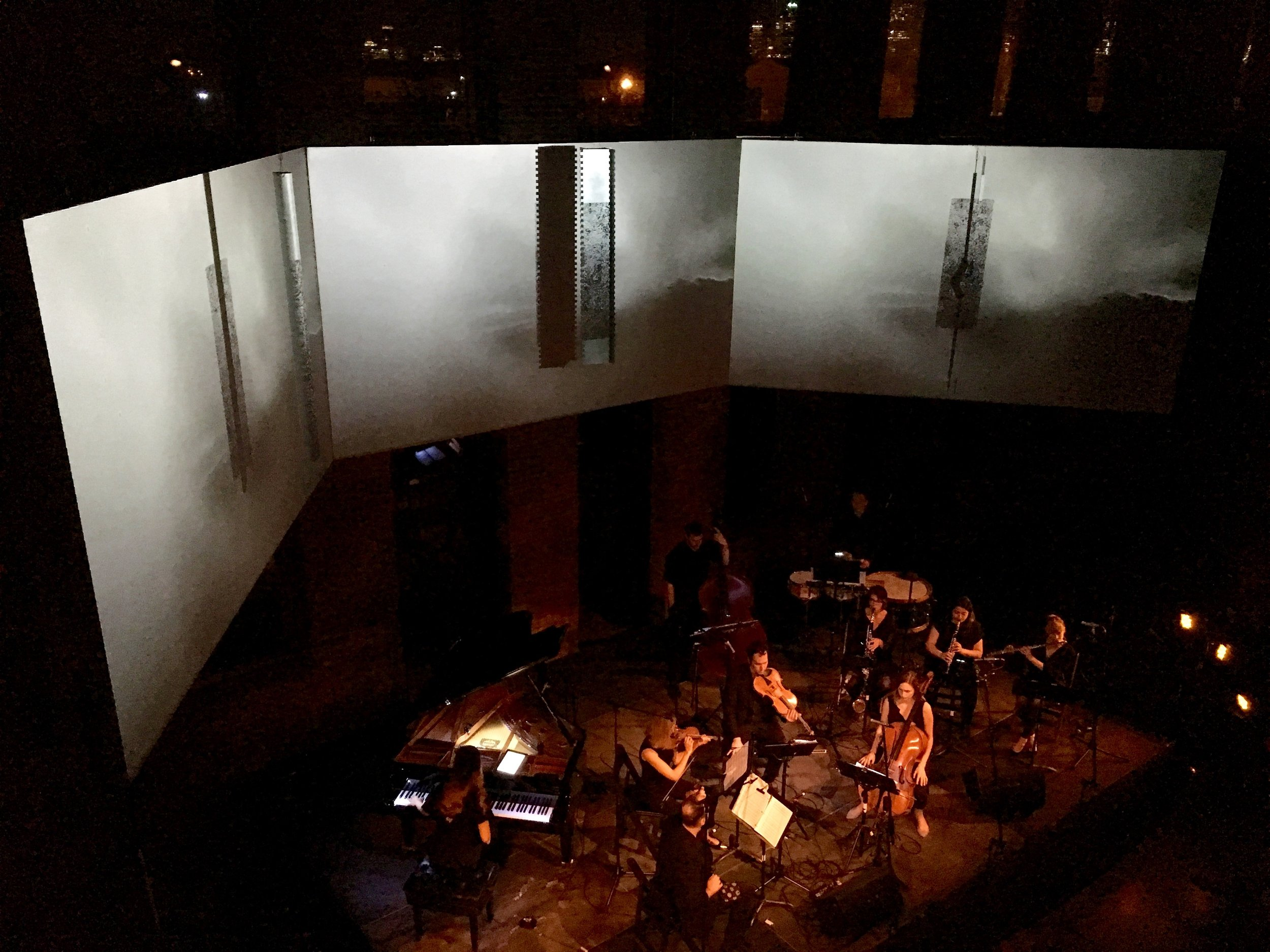
Wet Ink Ensemble performing Higgins' work "Emptyset [0,0]" from TOCSIN, at Pioneer Works, Brooklyn NY, November 2016

Higgins played guitar and assisted in arrangement and production on No-Wave auteur Arto Lindsay's Cuidado Madame, recorded in Brooklyn at Strange Weather Studios and released on Northern Spy in 2017. Higgins also played guitar for Cibo Matto's Miho Hatori during her Pioneer Works residency. In 2018, Hatori released the resulting record, Sequence, under the moniker Miss Information.

Higgins' solo LP Dossier was released on Nicolas Jaar's label, Other People, in 2018. Exclaim! magazine issued the work a 9/10, citing its "incredibly unique aesthetic", and Inverted Audio called Dossier "one of Higgins’ most accomplished works to date". Higgins' subsequent tour across Europe, Japan, and North America included a multimedia rendition of the work at the Merriweather Post Pavilion, featuring choreography by Monica Mirabile of Fluct and sculpture by light-based visual artist Matthew Schreiber.

In 2020, Higgins released TOCSIN, an album Pitchfork called "Higgins' most ambitious and wide-reaching collection of original compositions". The record followed a multimedia concert presented at Pioneer Works in 2016. Titled TOCSIN: Three New Works by Patrick Higgins, the two-night event featured an immersive art installation developed by Higgins in collaboration with visual artist Tauba Auerbach, architect Alexander Arroyo, and set designer/projectionist Ken Farmer; the premieres of Higgins' compositions were performed by Mivos Quartet, Wet Ink Ensemble, and a piano trio featuring Vicky Chow with cellists Mariel Roberts and Brian Snow. The resulting album, released on Telegraph Harp, features recordings of these pieces and personnel.

== Producer ==
In the fall of 2013, Higgins founded Future-Past Studios in upstate New York. The studio is home to a renowned collection of analog recording equipment and housed in an historic Lutheran church from the 19th century. He has worked as a record producer, engineer, and studio owner, and since the studio's opening has recorded over 60 records, including work with Dither Quartet and John Zorn, Vicky Chow of Bang on a Can, The Last Shadow Puppets (Arctic Monkeys), The National, War On Drugs, Zs, Gang Gang Dance, Amanda Palmer, Jherek Bischoff, Josephine Foster, Mivos Quartet, TAK ensemble, Richard Reed Parry of Arcade Fire, and numerous film scores.

== Discography ==
=== Solo / Primary Artist ===
Year	Title	Label	Additional personnel
2024	VERSUS	Other People	Chris Williams (trumpet), Bobby Previte (drums on two tracks)
2020	TOCSIN	Telegraph Harp	Wet Ink Ensemble, Vicky Chow, Mivos Quartet
2018	DOSSIER	Other People	
2017	EVRLY MVSIC	NNA	Patrick Higgins & Josh Modney
2015	Bachanalia	Telegraph Harp	
2015	Social Death Mixtape	NNA	Mivos Quartet and more; remixes of original compositions
2013	String Quartet No.2 + Glacia	Ex Cathedra, Words+Dreams	Mivos Quartet
2012	STEREO	Words+Dreams	
2012	Monkey Mountain	ELE, Unfun Records	

=== As band / ensemble member ===
Year	Artist	Title	Label	Personnel
2018	Zs	Noth	Social Noise	Sam Hillmer, Higgins, Greg Fox, Michael Beharie
2018	Miss Information	Sequence	Pioneer Works Press	Miho Hatori (ft. Higgins, Fox, Heems)
2017	Arto Lindsay	Cuidado Madame	Northern Spy	
2015	Zs	Xe	Northern Spy	Sam Hillmer, Patrick Higgins, Greg Fox
2013	Zs	Grain	Northern Spy	Sam Hillmer, Patrick Higgins, Greg Fox
2007	Animal / Archeaopteryx (split EP)	Horror Orr	Unfun Records	
2006	Animal	LP	Unfun Records	

=== Film scores ===
Year	Film	Soundtrack Label	Personnel
2019	Dreamland	Lakeshore Records (2020)	Composed by Patrick Higgins & Miles Joris-Peyrafitte
2016	As You Are	Votiv (2017)	Composed by Patrick Higgins & Miles Joris-Peyrafitte
2014	Gabriel		Composed by Patrick Higgins
