= I Want to Work for Diddy 2 =

- Season 2

Release
- Original network: VH1
- Original release: November 2, 2009 – January 4, 2010

Season chronology
- ← Previous; Season 1

I Want to Work for Diddy 2 is a reality show on VH1. It is the second season of I Want to Work for Diddy, where contestants are brought together to see who can become Sean Combs' personal assistant. Mark Jacobs is the show's co-executive producer and director. I Want to Work for Diddy 2 premiered on November 2, 2009. In the end, Ebony Jones was chosen to be his assistant.

== Contestants ==
Name	Occupation	Hometown	Result
Ebony Jones	High School Algebra Teacher	Dallas, Texas	Winner on Episode 10
Daniel Orrison	Wine Steward	Frederick, Maryland	Runner-Up on Episode 10
Ivory Tabb	Public Relations	New Jersey	Eliminated on Episode 9
Dalen Spratt	Business Owner	Dallas, Texas	Eliminated on Episode 8
Jennifer Bauer	Model	Troy, Michigan	Eliminated on Episode 6
Melissa LeEllen	Executive Assistant	Queens, New York	Eliminated on Episode 5
Kim "Poprah" Kearney	Entrepreneur	Atlanta, Georgia	Eliminated on Episode 4^{[e]}
Kennis Bell	Public Relations Student	Tyler, Texas	Eliminated on Episode 4
Blake Sunshine	Talent Promoter	Boston, Massachusetts	Eliminated on Episode 3
John Bonavia	Mall Manager	Washington, D.C.	Eliminated on Episode 3
Zach Wright	Internet Marketer	New Brunswick, New Jersey	Eliminated on Episode 2
Noelle Johnson	Pageant Queen	Portage, Michigan	Eliminated on Episode 1

=== Judges ===
- Capricorn Clark – Marketing Director, Sean John
- Phil Robinson – Diddy's former manager
- Andre Harrell – Diddy's mentor
- Kim "Poprah" Kearney – Former contestant (guest judge)

=== Weekly Results ===
Contestants	Episodes									
Contestants	1	2	3	4	5	6	7^{[h]}	8	9	10
Ebony^{[g]}	WIN	WIN	John	WIN	Melissa	IN	Daniel	Dalen	IN	WINNER
Daniel	Noelle	Zach	WIN	Ivory	Melissa	WIN	Ivory	Dalen	IN	OUT
Ivory	Noelle	Zach	WIN	Melissa	Jennifer	IN	Daniel	Daniel	OUT	
Dalen^{[g]}	WIN	WIN	John	WIN	Melissa	SAFE	Daniel	Daniel		
Jennifer	WIN	WIN	John	WIN	Melissa	OUT				
Melissa^{[b]}	WIN	Ivory	WIN	Ivory	Jennifer					
Kim^{[a]}^{[c]}^{[f]}			WIN	OUT^{[e]}						
Kennis	Ivory	Zach	WIN	Ivory^{[d]}						
Blake	WIN	WIN	John							
John	WIN	WIN	OUT							
Zach	Noelle	Ivory								
Noelle	Zach									

Teams
The contestant was on the Uptown team.
The contestant was on the Downtown team.

Competition
The contestant won.
The contestant was eliminated, but still hired.
The contestant won the challenge and was safe.
The contestant won the challenge and was in the bottom.
The contestant was in the bottom two or three, but was not eliminated.
The contestant was eliminated.
The contestant was out of the competition, after she was told to reveal that she was a spy for Diddy.
The contestant was not included in the episode, or was a judge.
The contestant lost the challenge but was safe.

Notes
^{^[a]}Kim "Poprah" Kearney from season one returned and joined the competition.
^{^[b]}In Episode 2, Melissa was voted to move from the Downtown Team to the Uptown Team so that both teams had an equal number of contestants.
^{^[c]}Capricorn Clark said that Kim "Poprah" would switch teams every week.
^{^[d]}Kennis was not originally put up for elimination, but was eliminated.
^{^[e]}In Episode 4, Poprah revealed herself as a spy for Diddy, when she was a judge for elimination. Therefore Diddy no longer needed her and was out of the competition.
^{^[f]}In Episode 5, Poprah was the judge for elimination, and Poprah said that there would be no more teams.
^{^[g]}In Episode 7, Dalen and Ebony were not originally put up for elimination.
^{^[h]}In Episode 7, everyone was at risk of being eliminated, but all were ultimately given one more chance to prove themselves.

In Episodes 1,3,5 & 7 Ivory used her infamous catch phrase "manwhich a bitch" a phrase that caught on with fans instantly.

== Episodes ==
=== Welcome to Bad Boy ===
First aired November 2, 2009

- Challenge: Collect the Most Foreign Languages
- Challenge Winners: Downtown Team
- Bottom 2: Ivory, Noelle
- Eliminated: Noelle
- Ivory became a fan favorite and quickly earned the title of having the catchphrase of the season after telling one of her competitors she was going to "manwhich a bitch"
- Elimination Notes: After Noelle's elimination, Melissa was switched to the Uptown Team.

=== Sean John Reinvented ===
First aired November 9, 2009

- Challenge: Shoot a Print Ad for the New Sean John Logo
- Challenge Winners: Downtown Team
- Bottom 2: Ivory, Zach
- Eliminated: Zach
- Elimination Notes: Poprah returned to the competition after making a special guest appearance.

=== Chariots for Charity ===
First aired November 16, 2009

- Challenge: Collect Donations for the Fresh Air Fund
  - Downtown: $1700
  - Uptown: $5500
- Challenge Winners: Uptown Team
- Bottom 3: Blake, Ebony, John
- Eliminated: Blake, John
- Elimination Notes: Poprah was moved to the Downtown Team to even the teams after the Uptown Team lost two members in elimination.

=== Diddy or Didn't He? ===
First aired November 23, 2009

- 1st Challenge: Assist Mr. Combs in Doing Press Interviews
- 2nd Challenge: Play Diddy or Didn't He? Game Show
  - Downtown: 110 pts.
  - Uptown: 50 pts.
- Challenge Winners: Downtown
- Bottom 2: Ivory, Kennis
- Eliminated: Kennis
- Left: Poprah^{[e]}
- Episode/Elimination Notes: Kennis was not originally put up for elimination, but was eliminated; Poprah leaves the house after she reveals herself that she was a spy for Diddy.

=== Welcome to Daddy's House ===
First aired November 30, 2009

- Challenge: Work The Night Shift At Diddy's House
- Challenge Winners: Ebony
- Bottom 2: Jen, Melissa
- Eliminated: Melissa
- Elimination Notes: Both teams are at elimination; Poprah talks with them instead of Capricorn about who they should vote for.

=== Truth and Its Consequences ===
First aired December 7, 2009

- Challenge: Learning To Be Honest
- Challenge Winner: None
- Bottom 5: Dalen, Daniel, Ebony, Ivory, Jen
- Eliminated: Jen
- Elimination/Episode Notes: Elimination is held at Diddy's office, and Diddy decides who goes home; there are no more teams starting from Episode 6; Diddy felt that he would not hire someone like Jen and eliminated her.

=== A Family Affair ===
First aired December 14, 2009

- Challenge: Family Dinner At Sea
- Challenge Winner: Daniel
- Bottom 4: Dalen, Daniel, Ebony, Ivory
- Eliminated: None
- Elimination/Episode Notes: Dalen and Ebony were not originally put up for elimination.

=== The Fashion Event ===
First aired December 21, 2009

- Challenge: Throw A Preview Party For New Sean John Collection
- Challenge Winner: None
- Bottom 2: Dalen, Daniel
- Eliminated: Dalen
- Elimination/Episode Notes: With only four contestants remaining, team competitions were eliminated and it became a 1-versus-all format.

=== The Fashion Event Pt. 2 ===
First aired December 28, 2009

- Challenge: Throw A Preview Party For New Sean John Collection
- Challenge Winner: None
- Bottom: Daniel, Ebony and Ivory
- Eliminated: Ivory
- Elimination/Episode Notes: Capricorn saves the fashion show from disaster. The exercise ball incident from the first episode is brought up again and Ivory is eliminated.

=== Season Finale ===
First aired January 4, 2010

- Challenge: Assist Mr. Combs
- Runner-Up: Daniel
- Winner: Ebony
