= Made Flesh =

Studio album by Extra Life
- Released: March 30, 2010
- Recorded: 2009–2010
- Genre: Math rock Experimental rock
- Length: 43:28
- Label: Lo Recordings

Extra Life chronology
Secular Works (2008)	Made Flesh (2010)

Professional ratings
Review scores
Source	Rating
Drowned in Sound	(8/10)
Dusted Magazine	(favorable)
Sputnikmusic	4.5/5 stars
Washington City Paper	(favorable)

Made Flesh is the second album by the experimental rock band Extra Life.

According to Rock-A-Rolla magazine, the album is "darker, harder and bleaker" than its predecessor, Secular Works. Writing in The Quietus, Noel Gardner described it as "the best album of [2010]."

== Track listing ==
1. "Voluptuous Life" – 2:07
2. "The Ladder" – 6:27
3. "Made Flesh" – 4:57
4. "One of Your Whores" – 5:03
5. "Easter" – 6:13
6. "Black Hoodie" – 3:24
7. "Head Shrinker" – 4:07
8. "The Body Is True" – 11:15

== Personnel ==
- Charlie Looker: guitar, vocals
- Travis Laplante: keyboards, tenor sax, EWI
- Anthony Gedrich: bass, contrabass
- Nick Podgurski: drums, percussion
- Caley Monahon-Ward: violin, mandolin, engineer
- Ian Antonio: glockenspiel, vibraphone, crotales, wood block
- Larkin Grimm: backing vocals on "One of Your Whores" and "Head Shrinker"

All music and lyrics by Charlie Looker
