= Xe (album) =

Studio album by Zs
- Released: January 27, 2015
- Recorded: 2011 – 2014, Future-Past Studios, Hudson, New York
- Genre: Free jazz, experimental rock, jazz fusion, post-minimalism, math rock
- Length: 42:23
- Label: Northern Spy Records
- Producer: Patrick Higgins

Zs chronology
Grain (2013)	Xe (2015)

Professional ratings
Aggregate scores
Source	Rating
Metacritic	82/100
Review scores
Source	Rating
Pitchfork Media	(8.0/10)
PopMatters	7/10 stars
Tiny Mix Tapes	4.5/5 stars

Xe is the seventh studio album by American experimental ensemble Zs. It is their second album to feature guitarist/composer Patrick Higgins and percussionist Greg Fox, noted for his work with Liturgy and Guardian Alien. The album artwork was designed by Tauba Auerbach and was acquired for the permanent collection of the SF MOMA in 2016.

== Track listing ==
No.	Title	Length
1.	"The Future of Royalty"	2:27
2.	"Wolf Government"	5:59
3.	"Corps"	12:27
4.	"Weakling"	5:49
5.	"XE"	18:12

== Personnel ==
Credit Information taken from AllMusic and the Northern Spy Records website

=== Zs ===
- Sam Hillmer – tenor saxophone, pedals
- Patrick Higgins – electronics, guitar
- Greg Fox – drums, percussion

=== Technical personnel ===
- Patrick Higgins – producer, mixing
- Henry Hirsch – engineer
- Heba Kadry - mastering
- Tauba Auerbach – artwork
