= Laverne Cox =

American actress and LGBTQ advocate (born 1972)

- Cox in October 2024
- Born: May 29, 1972 (age 54); Mobile, Alabama, U.S.
- Education: Fashion Institute of Technology; Indiana University Bloomington; Marymount Manhattan College
- Occupations: Actress; activist
- Years active: 2000–present
- Relatives: M Lamar (twin brother)
- Website: lavernecox.com

Laverne Cox (born May 29, 1972) is an American actress and LGBTQ advocate. She rose to prominence with her role as Sophia Burset on the Netflix series Orange Is the New Black, becoming in 2014 the first transgender person to be nominated for a Primetime Emmy Award in an acting category, and the first to be nominated for any Emmy Award since composer Angela Morley in 1990. In 2015, she won a Daytime Emmy Award in Outstanding Special Class Special as executive producer for Laverne Cox Presents: The T Word, making her the first trans woman to win the award. In 2017, she became the first transgender person to play a transgender series regular on American broadcast TV as Cameron Wirth on CBS's Doubt.

Cox appeared as a contestant on the first season of VH1's reality show I Want to Work for Diddy, and co-produced and co-hosted the VH1 makeover television series TRANSform Me. In April 2014, Cox was honored by GLAAD with its Stephen F. Kolzak Award for her work as an advocate for the transgender community. In June 2014, Cox became the first transgender person to appear on the cover of Time magazine. Cox is the first transgender person to appear on the cover of a Cosmopolitan magazine, with her February 2018 cover on the South African edition. She is also the first openly transgender person to have a wax figure of herself at Madame Tussauds.

== Early life ==
Cox was born in Mobile, Alabama, and was raised by a single mother and grandmother within the AME Zion church. She has an identical twin brother, M Lamar, who portrayed the pre-transitioning Sophia (as Marcus) in Orange Is the New Black. Cox has stated that she attempted suicide at the age of 11, when she noticed that she had developed feelings for her male classmates and had been bullied for several years for not acting "the way someone assigned male at birth was supposed to act".

She is a graduate of the Alabama School of Fine Arts in Birmingham, Alabama, where she studied creative writing before switching to dance. She then studied for two years at Indiana University Bloomington before transferring to Marymount Manhattan College in New York City, where she switched from dancing (specifically classical ballet) to acting. She also studied as a Fashion Merchandising Management major at the Fashion Institute of Technology. During her first season on Orange Is the New Black, she was still appearing at a restaurant on the Lower East Side as a drag queen (where she had applied initially to work as a waitress).

== Career ==
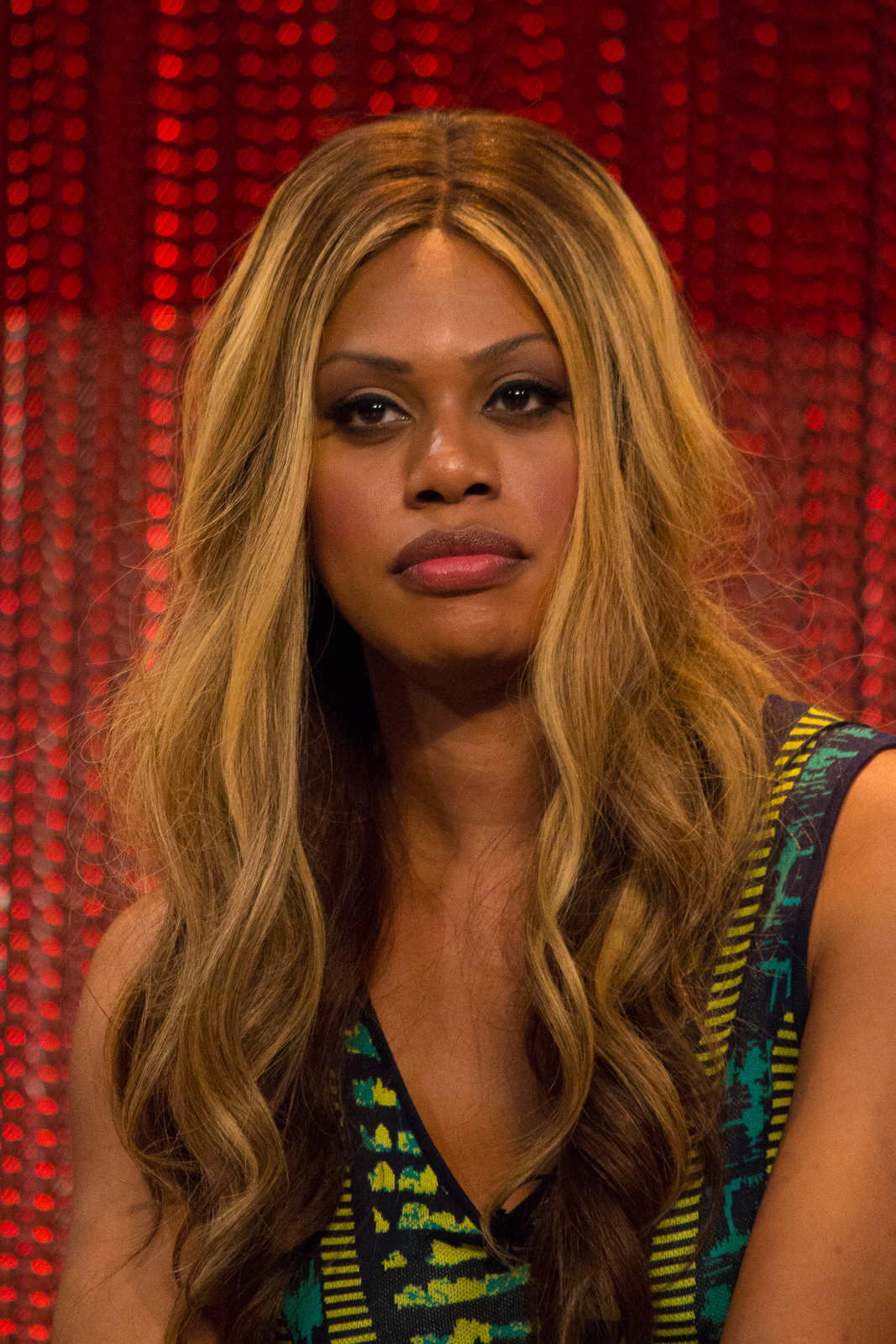
Laverne Cox at PaleyFest 2014 representing Orange Is the New Black.

Cox appeared as a contestant on the first season of I Want to Work for Diddy; afterwards she was approached by VH1 about show ideas. From that came the makeover television series TRANSform Me, which made Cox the first African-American transgender person to produce and star in her own TV show. Both those shows were nominated for a GLAAD Media Award for outstanding reality program, and when Diddy won in 2009, Cox accepted the award at the ceremony, giving a speech described by the San Francisco Sentinel as "among the most poignant because [it] reminded us how important it is to tell our stories, all of our stories." She has also acted in a number of TV shows and films, including Law & Order: Special Victims Unit, Bored to Death, and Musical Chairs.

In 2013, Cox began her recurring role in the Netflix series Orange is the New Black as Sophia Burset, a trans woman sent to prison for credit-card fraud. In that year, she stated, "Sophia is written as a multi-dimensional character who the audience can really empathize with—all of the sudden they're empathizing with a real Trans person. And for Trans folks out there, who need to see representations of people who are like them and of their experiences, that's when it becomes really important." Cox's role in Orange is the New Black provides her a platform to speak on the rights of trans people.

In January 2014, Cox joined trans woman Carmen Carrera on Katie Couric's syndicated show, Katie. Couric referred to transgender people as "transgenders", and after being rebuffed by Carrera on the subject of her surgeries, specifically what genital reconstruction she had done, turned the same question to Cox. Cox responded,

I do feel there is a preoccupation with that. The preoccupation with transition and surgery objectifies trans people. And then we don't get to really deal with the real lived experiences. The reality of trans people's lives is that so often we are targets of violence. We experience discrimination disproportionately to the rest of the community. Our unemployment rate is twice the national average; if you are a trans person of color, that rate is four times the national average. The homicide rate is highest among trans women. If we focus on transition, we don't actually get to talk about those things.

News outlets such as Salon, The Huffington Post, and Business Insider covered what was characterized by Salon writer Katie McDonough as Couric's "clueless" and "invasive" line of questioning.

Cox was on the cover of the June 9, 2014, issue of Time and was interviewed for the article "The Transgender Tipping Point" by Katy Steinmetz, which ran in that issue and the title of which was also featured on the cover; this makes Cox the first transgender person on the cover of Time.

Later in 2014, Cox became the first transgender person to be nominated for a Primetime Emmy Award in an acting category: Outstanding Guest Actress in a Comedy Series for her role as Sophia Burset in Orange Is the New Black. She also appeared in John Legend's video for the song "You & I (Nobody in the World)".

Cox joined a campaign in 2014 against a Phoenix, Arizona, law which allows police to arrest anyone suspected of "manifesting prostitution", and which she feels targets transgender women of color, following the conviction of activist (and transgender woman of color) Monica Jones. Cox stated, "All over the country, trans women are targeted simply for being who they are. Laws like this manifestation law really support systematically the idea that girls like me, girls like me and Monica, are less than [others] in this country." Later that year the Sylvia Rivera Law Project released a video in which Cox read a letter from transgender inmate Synthia China Blast, addressing common issues faced by trans inmates. But when Cox learned that Blast was found guilty of the 1993 rape and murder of a 13-year-old child, she wrote on her Tumblr, "I was not aware of the charges for which she was convicted. If I had been aware of those charges, I would have never agreed to read the letter."

Cox was featured in the annual "Rebels" issue of V in late 2014. For the issue, V asked celebrities and artists to nominate who they saw as their personal rebels, and Natasha Lyonne nominated Cox. Cox was also on the cover of the October 2014 issue of Essence magazine, along with actresses Alfre Woodard, Nicole Beharie, and Danai Gurira.

On October 17, 2014, Laverne Cox Presents: The T Word, an hour-long documentary executive-produced and narrated by Cox, premiered on MTV and Logo simultaneously. That same year, Cox was featured on the fifth anniversary cover of C☆NDY magazine along with 13 other transgender women—Janet Mock, Carmen Carrera, Geena Rocero, Isis King, Gisele Alicea, Leyna Ramous, Dina Marie, Nina Poon, Juliana Huxtable, Niki M'nray, Pêche Di, Carmen Xtravaganza (House of Xtravaganza), and Yasmine Petty.

In 2015, Cox won a Daytime Emmy Award in Outstanding Special Class Special as Executive Producer for Laverne Cox Presents: The T Word. This made Cox the first transgender woman to win a Daytime Emmy as an Executive Producer; as well, The T Word is the first trans documentary to win a Daytime Emmy. That year Cox, among others, posed nude for the Allure annual "Nudes" issue, becoming the first transgender actress to do so.

Cox is the cover subject for the June 11, 2015, "totally not-straight issue" of Entertainment Weekly, the first issue of the magazine in 15 years to focus exclusively on gay, lesbian, and transgender entertainment.

In June 2016, the Human Rights Campaign released a video in tribute to the victims of the Orlando nightclub shooting; in the video, Cox and others told the stories of the people killed there.

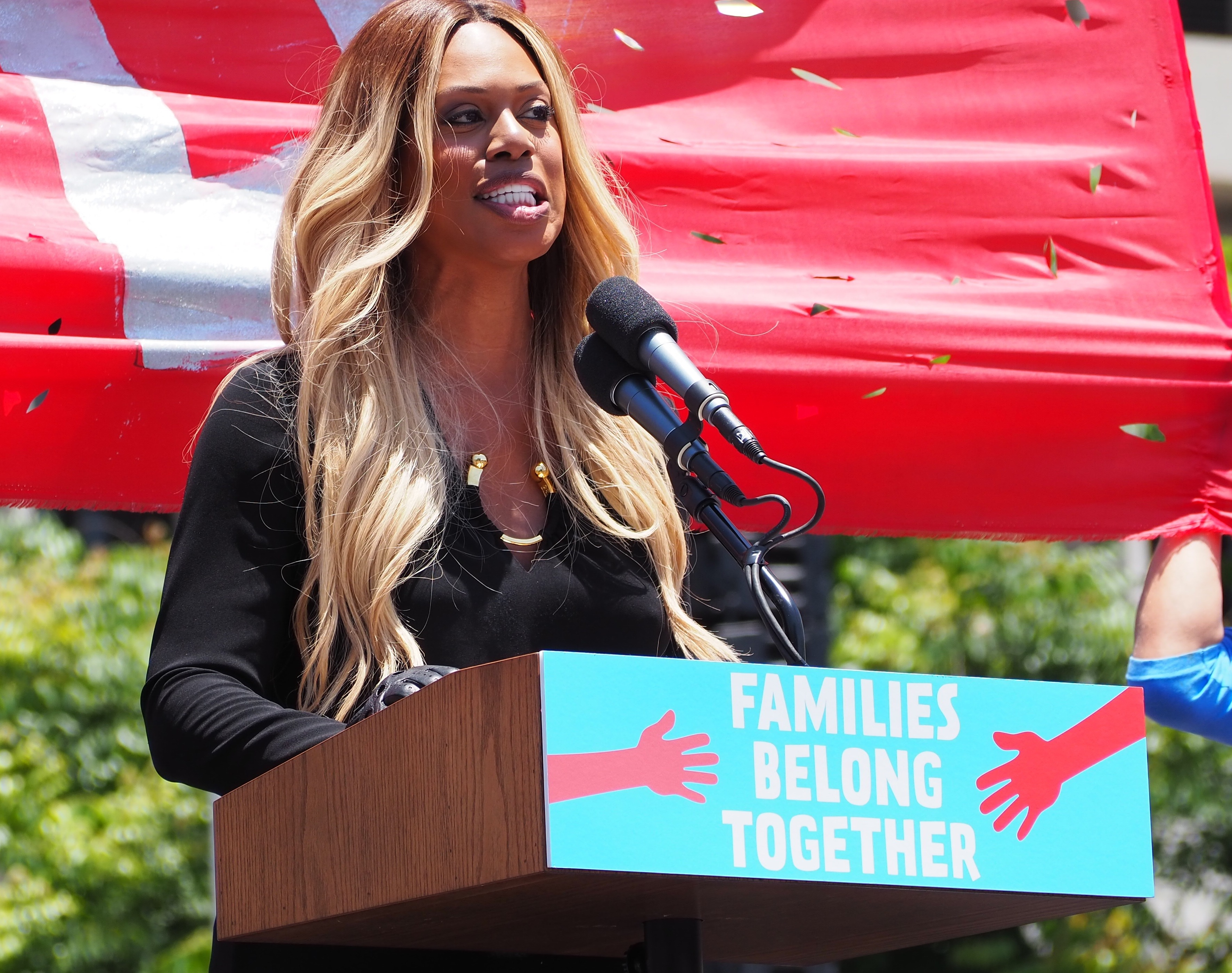
Cox at L.A.'s Families Belong Together March in June 2018

In 2017, Cox began her role as transgender attorney Cameron Wirth on Doubt on CBS. However, after only two episodes had aired, CBS announced that they were pulling the series from their schedule, leaving the future of the remaining unaired episodes uncertain. It was the first official cancellation of the 2016–17 season, following weak viewership. CBS later announced that the remaining 11 episodes would be broadcast on Saturday, beginning July 1.

Cox was nominated in 2017 for a Primetime Emmy Award for Outstanding Guest Actress in a Drama Series for her role in Orange Is the New Black.

Also in 2017, Cox collaborated with the ACLU, Zackary Drucker, Molly Crabapple, and Kim Boekbinder, in making a video about transgender history and resistance, called "Time Marches Forward & So Do We", which Cox narrated. That year Cox became one of the four faces of the fall campaign for the Ivy Park line of clothing.

In February 2019, Cox headlined the New York Fashion Week show for 11 Honoré, a luxury e-retailer focused on plus-sized designer fashion.

Cox was featured in Taylor Swift's "You Need to Calm Down" music video, which was released June 17, 2019.

She was one of fifteen women chosen by guest editor Meghan, Duchess of Sussex, to appear on the cover of the September 2019 issue of British Vogue; this made Cox the first transgender woman to appear on the cover of British Vogue.

In September 2019, Cox brought ACLU attorney Chase Strangio as her date to the 2019 Emmy Awards, and carried a custom rainbow clutch featuring the phrases "Oct 8", "Title VII", and "Supreme Court". This action was in reference to the U.S. Supreme Court case R.G. & G.R. Harris Funeral Homes Inc. v. Equal Employment Opportunity Commission, in which Strangio was one of the lawyers representing Aimee Stephens, a trans woman who was fired from her job at a funeral home. Cox and Strangio spoke to reporters on the red carpet about the upcoming court case. Cox executive produced the documentary Disclosure: Trans Lives on Screen, which premiered on Netflix on January 27, 2020.

In May 2021, E! announced that Cox would become the host of Live from the Red Carpet starting in January 2022, replacing Giuliana Rancic. In December 2021, she was cast in Netflix's dystopian fantasy film The Uglies directed by McG, based on a book of the same name by Scott Westerfeld.

In 2024, Cox competed in season twelve of The Masked Singer as "Chess Piece" where Nikki Glaser (who performed "Snowstorm" in season eight) served as her Mask Ambassador. She was eliminated on "Barbie Night".

In April 2025, Cox hosted Billboard's Women in Music.

In June 2025, Cox served as one of WorldPride DC's grand marshals alongside Reneé Rapp.

In November 2025, Cox announced her upcoming memoir, Transcendent. The book was released in June 2026.

In a June 2026 interview, Cox noted that she depends on public speaking engagements and brand ambassadorships in addition to acting, but has lost 90% of her income over the past two years due to actions by the Trump administration targeting things deemed as related to diversity, equity, and inclusion (DEI), or to "gender ideology".

== Impact ==
Cox has been noted by her LGBTQ peers, and many others, for being a trailblazer for the transgender community, and has won numerous awards for her activist approach in spreading awareness. Her impact and prominence in the media has led to a growing conversation about transgender culture, specifically transgender women, and how being transgender intersects with one's race. She is the first transgender person to be on the cover of Time magazine, be nominated for a Primetime Emmy, and have a wax work in Madame Tussauds, as well as the first transgender woman to win a Daytime Emmy as an executive producer. In May 2016, Cox was awarded an Honorary Doctorate from The New School in New York City for her progressive work in the fight for gender equality.

== Filmography ==
=== Film ===
Year	Title	Role	Notes
2000	Betty Anderson	Deirdre	Short film
2004	The Kings of Brooklyn	Girl	
2008	All Night	Layla	Short film
2009	Uncle Stephanie	Stephanie	
2010	Bronx Paradise	Hooker	
2011	Carla	Cinnamon	
2011	Musical Chairs	Chantelle	
2012	Migraine	Lola	Short film
2012	The Exhibitionists	Blithe Stargazer	
2013	36 Saints	Genesuis	
2014	Grand Street	Chardonnay	
2014	Laverne Cox Presents: The T Word	Herself	Daytime Emmy Awards for Outstanding Special Class Special (2015); Nominated - GLAAD Media Award for Outstanding Documentary (2015)
2015	Grandma	Deathy	
2017	Freak Show	Felicia	
2019	Can You Keep a Secret?	Cybill	
2019	Charlie's Angels	Bomb Instructor	Cameo
2020	Bad Hair	Virgie	
2020	Promising Young Woman	Gail	
2020	Disclosure: Trans Lives on Screen	Herself	Also executive producer
2021	Jolt	Detective Nevin	
2024	Uglies	Dr. Cable	
2025	Animal Farm	Snowball	Voice
2025	A Very Jonas Christmas Movie	Stacy	
2026	Outcome	Virginia Allen Green	

=== Television ===
Year	Title	Role	Notes
2008	Law & Order: Special Victims Unit	Candace	Episode: "Closet"
2008	I Want to Work for Diddy	Herself	6 episodes
2008	Law & Order	Minnie	Episode: "Sweetie"
2009	Bored to Death	Transsexual prostitute	Episode: "Stockholm Syndrome"
2010	TRANSform Me	Herself	Also producer 8 episodes
2013–2019	Orange Is the New Black	Sophia Burset	Recurring role; 40 episodes Screen Actors Guild Award for Outstanding Performance by an Ensemble in a Comedy Series (2015–2016); Nominated—Critics' Choice Television Award for Best Supporting Actress in a Comedy Series (2014); Nominated—NAACP Image Award for Outstanding Supporting Actress in a Comedy Series (2015–2017); Nominated—Primetime Emmy Award for Outstanding Guest Actress in a Comedy Series (2014); Nominated—Primetime Emmy Award for Outstanding Guest Actress in a Drama Series (2017, 2019–2020)
2014	Faking It	Margot	Episode: "Lying Kings and Drama Queens"
2014	Girlfriends' Guide to Divorce	Adele Northrop	Episode: "Rule No. 426: Fantasyland: A Great Place to Visit"
2015–2017	The Mindy Project	Sheena	3 episodes
2016	The Rocky Horror Picture Show: Let's Do the Time Warp Again	Dr. Frank-N-Furter	Television movie
2016–2019	Lip Sync Battle	Herself	2 episodes
2017	America's Got Talent	Herself; Guest Judge	1 episode; S12E10
2017	Doubt	Cameron Wirth	13 episodes
2018	Who Do You Think You Are?	Herself	Episode: "Laverne Cox"
2019	Weird City	Liquia	Episode: "Smart House"
2019	Tuca & Bertie	Ebony Black (voice)	Episode: "The Sex Bugs"
2019	Dear White People	Cynthia Fray	Episode: "Chapter VII"
2019	A Black Lady Sketch Show	Kiana	Episode: "Angela Bassett Is the Baddest Bitch"
2020	Awkwafina Is Nora from Queens	God (voice)	Episode: "Pilot"
2020	Curb Your Enthusiasm	Herself	Episode: "Artificial Fruit"
2020	One World: Together at Home	Herself	Television special
2021	The Blacklist	Dr. Laken Perillos	Episode: "Dr. Laken Perillos"
2022	Celebrity Wheel of Fortune	Herself	Season 2 Episode 13
2022	Inventing Anna	Kacy Duke	Series regular
2022	Norman Lear: 100 Years of Music & Laughter	Herself	Television special
2022	If We're Being Honest with Laverne Cox	Herself	Talk show host
2024	Password	Herself	Season 2 Episode 6
2024	The Daily Show	Herself	Segment: "In My Opinion"
2024	The Masked Singer	Herself/Chess Piece	5 episodes, Season 12
2025	Clean Slate	Desiree	Main role, co-creator, and executive producer

== Accolades ==
=== Emmy Awards ===
Year	Category	Nominated work	Result	Ref.
Daytime Emmy Awards
2015	Outstanding Special Class Special	Laverne Cox Presents: The T Word	Won	
Primetime Emmy Awards
2014	Outstanding Guest Actress In A Comedy Series	Orange Is the New Black	Nominated	

=== NAACP Image Awards ===
Year	Category	Nominated work	Result
2015	Outstanding Supporting Actress in a Comedy Series	Orange Is The New Black	Nominated
2016	Outstanding Supporting Actress in a Comedy Series	Orange Is The New Black	Nominated
2017	Outstanding Supporting Actress in a Comedy Series	Orange Is The New Black	Nominated

=== Miscellaneous awards and nominations ===
Year	Award	Category	Work	Result	Ref.
2013	Massachusetts Independent Film Festival	Best Supporting Actress in a Feature	Musical Chairs	Won	
2013	Anti-Violence Project	Courage Award	Herself	Honored	
2013	Out Magazine's OUT100 Gala	Readers Choice Award	Herself	Honored	
2014	Critics' Choice Television Awards	Best Supporting Actress in a Comedy Series	Orange Is The New Black	Nominated	
2014	GALECA: The Society of LGBTQ Entertainment Critics	We're Wilde About You! Rising Star of the Year	Herself	Honored	
2014	GLAAD Media Awards	Stephen F. Kolzak Award	Herself	Honored	
2014	Gold Derby Awards	Comedy Guest Actress	Orange Is The New Black	Nominated	
2014	International Online Cinema Awards	Best Guest Actress in a Drama or Comedy Series	Orange Is The New Black	Nominated	
2014	Glamour Magazine	Woman of the Year	Herself	Honored	
2014	Gold Derby Awards	Breakthrough Performer of the Year	Herself	Nominated	
2014	Online Film & Television Awards	Best Guest Actress in a Comedy Series	Orange Is The New Black	Nominated	
2015	Screen Actors Guild Awards	Outstanding Performance by an Ensemble in a Comedy Series	Orange Is The New Black	Won	
2016	Screen Actors Guild Awards	Outstanding Performance by an Ensemble in a Comedy Series	Orange Is The New Black	Won	
2017	Gold Derby Awards	Drama Guest Actress	Orange Is The New Black	Nominated	
2017	Online Film & Television Awards	Best Guest Actress in a Comedy Series	Orange Is The New Black	Nominated	
2017	Queerty Awards	Badass	Herself	Nominated	
2018	British LGBT Awards	LGBT+ Celebrity	Herself	Won	
2018	Transgender Law Center	Claire Skiffington Vanguard Award	Herself	Honored	
2019	Gold Derby Awards	Drama Guest Actress	Orange Is The New Black	Nominated	
2020	Gold Derby Awards	Drama Guest Actress	Orange Is The New Black	Nominated	
2021	Queerty Awards	Film Performance	Promising Young Woman	Won	
2022	Hutchins Center for African and African American Research at Harvard University	The W. E. B. Du Bois Medal	Herself	Honored	
2022	iHeart Podcast Awards	Best Overall Host - Female	The Laverne Cox Show	Nominated	
2022	Webby Awards	Advocate of the Year	Herself	Honored	
2025	Queerty Awards	Style Icon	Herself	Nominated	
2026	GLAAD Media Awards	Outstanding New TV Series	Clean Slate	Pending	
2026	GLAAD Media Awards	Outstanding Variety or Talk Show Episode	The View: "Laverne Cox and George Wallace Star In Norman Lear’s Final Show, ‘Clean Slate'"	Pending	

=== Honors ===
- 2014 – Included in the annual Root 100; this list honors "standout black leaders, innovators and culture shapers" aged 45 and younger.
- 2014 – Topped the British newspaper The Guardian's third annual World Pride Power List, which ranks the world's most influential LGBTQ people.
- 2014 – Named to the EBONY Power 100 list.
- 2015 – Named to the 2015 OUT Power 50 List.
- 2015 – Included in the People World's Most Beautiful Women List.
- 2015 – Three Twins Ice Cream in San Francisco renamed its chocolate orange confetti ice cream Laverne Cox's Chocolate Orange is the New Black for Pride weekend.
- 2015 – Named in the 2015 Time 100 Most Influential People List; her entry was written by Jazz Jennings.
- 2015 – Named by Forum for Equality as one of their 31 Icons of the LGBT History Month.
- 2016 – Awarded Honorary Doctorate from The New School.
- 2017 – Named to the 2017 OUT Power 50 List.

== Discography ==
=== Soundtrack albums ===
Title	Album
The Rocky Horror Picture Show: Let's Do the Time Warp Again (with Various Artists)	Released: October 21, 2016; Format: Digital download; Label: Ode Sounds & Visuals

=== Singles ===
Title	Year	Peak chart positions	
Title	Year	US Dance Club	US Dance/ Elec.
"Beat for the Gods"	2018	22	—
"Welcome Home"	2019	6	30
"America the Beautiful"	2020	—	—

== See also ==
- LGBTQ culture in New York City
- List of LGBT people from New York City
- NYC Pride March
- Transgender culture of New York City
