= Larkin Grimm =

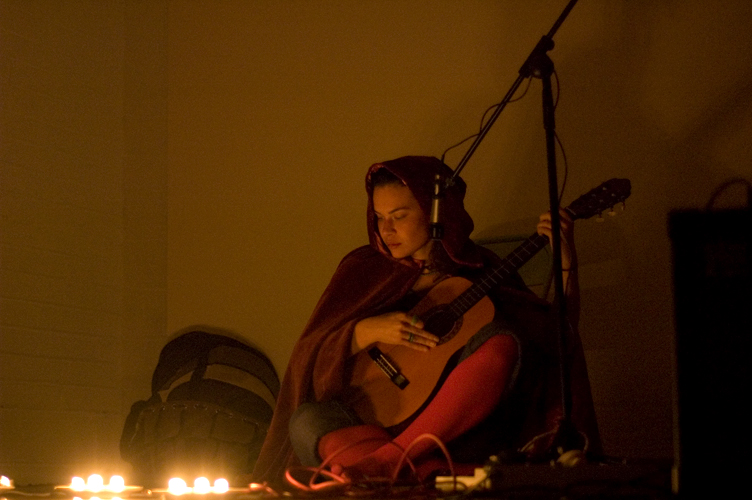

Background information
- Born: 1981 (age 44–45); Memphis, Tennessee
- Origin: United States
- Genres: Folk, psychedelic folk, experimental
- Occupations: Singer, songwriter, musician
- Years active: 2005–present
- Labels: Northern Spy Records, Secret Eye Records, Young God Records
- Website: http://larkingrimm.net

Larkin Grimm (born 1981) is an American singer-songwriter and musician based in New York City. She was born in Memphis, Tennessee.

== Early life and career ==
At age 20 Grimm dropped out of Yale University and moved to Alaska, where she hiked and began to experiment with singing. Several months later she was convinced by a friend to return to Yale and graduate with her degree in Art. Before leaving Yale, She began recording her first album Harpoon, which was partly influenced by Grimm's experiences performing with the Dirty Projectors. Grimm then moved to Providence, Rhode Island, where she has since produced another album called The Last Tree. Larkin's third album Parplar was released October 2008 by Young God Records.

In 2017 Grimm released her album Chasing an Illusion on Northern Spy Records. Chasing an Illusion was recorded in a natural cave featuring raw vocals and working from live recordings layered on the same mixing board used for David Bowie’s Young Americans. Sasha Geffen's review on Pitchfork states, "These paradoxical moments of sorrowful lyrics against spirited playing make up the crux of the magic Grimm weaves on Chasing an Illusion. Pain can be paralyzing, but it can also level the ground for something new to grow. Pain and the healing that follows it can turn us loose."

== Discography ==
- Harpoon (Secret Eye, 2005)
- The Last Tree (Secret Eye, 2006)
- Parplar (Young God Records, 2008)
- Larkin Grimm / Extra Life 12" (split single with Extra Life) (2011)
- Soul Retrieval (Bad Bitch Records, 2012)
- Moons of June (self-released, 2015)
- Chasing an Illusion (Northern Spy Records, 2017)

=== Guest vocals ===
- Hungry Ghosts: These Songs Are Doors (2007) by Mudboy
- We Are Him (2007) by Angels of Light
- Technicolor Health (2009) by Harlem Shakes
- Boy from Black Mountain (2009) by Beat Circus
- Made Flesh (2010) by Extra Life
- No Más (2010) by Javelin
