= Parplar =

Studio album by Larkin Grimm
- Released: 2008
- Genre: Freak folk; experimental
- Length: 40:25
- Label: Young God
- Producer: Michael Gira

Larkin Grimm chronology
The Last Tree (2006)	Parplar (2008)

Professional ratings
Review scores
Source	Rating
AllMusic	4/5 stars
The Boston Globe	favorable
The New York Times	favorable
Pennyblackmusic	favorable
Pitchfork	5.2/10

Parplar is the third studio album by folk artist Larkin Grimm. It was released in 2008, the first album on Young God Records. The cover art was done by New York-based artist Lauren Beck.

== Track listing ==
1. "They Were Wrong" – 3:43
2. "Ride That Cyclone" – 4:02
3. "Blond and Golden Johns" – 3:08
4. "Dominican Rum" – 3:55
5. "Parplar" – 2:09
6. "Durge" – 2:27
7. "Be My Host" – 3:02
8. "Mino Minou" – 1:36
9. "My Justine" – 4:34
10. "Anger in Your Liver" – 1:36
11. "All the Pleasures in the World" – 1:30
12. "Fall on My Knees" – 2:51
13. "How to Catch a Lizard" – 1:55
14. "The Dip" – 1:12
15. "Hope of the Hopeless" – 2:45
