= The Last Tree (album) =

Studio album by Larkin Grimm
- Released: 2006
- Genre: Freak folk, experimental folk, neofolk
- Length: 51:20
- Label: Secret Eye
- Producer: Larkin Grimm

Larkin Grimm chronology
Harpoon (2005)	The Last Tree (2006)	Parplar (2008)

Professional ratings
Review scores
Source	Rating
AllMusic	3.5/5 stars

The Last Tree is the second album by Larkin Grimm, released in 2006.

== Track listing ==
1. "The Last Tree" – 5:10
2. "Into the Grey Forest, Breathing Love" – 2:11
3. "I Killed Someone (Part 2)" – 4:54
4. "There is a Giant Panther" – 1:43
5. "Little Weeper" – 10:17
6. "The Most Excruciating Vibe" – 6:53
7. "No Moonlight" – 3:04
8. "Strange Creature" – 5:26
9. "The Sun Comes Up" – 1:55
10. "Link In Your Chain" – 3:59
11. "Rocky Top" – 3:19
12. "The Waterfall" – 2:29
