= Salisbury (1781 ship) =

18th-century British merchant ship

History

Great Britain
- Name: Salisbury
- Builder: Havana
- Renamed: 1785: Rebecca; 1787:Harpooner
- Fate: Wrecked 1789

General characteristics
- Tons burthen: 450 (bm)
- Armament: 20 × 9-pounder guns
- Notes: 1776 rebuilt of cedar

Salisbury was built at Havana c.1761 under another name. She first appeared under British ownership in 1781 as a West Indiaman. In 1785 she became the northern whale fishery whaler Rebecca. In 1787 new owners renamed her Harpooner and she was briefly a northern whaler in the Davis Strait. She was wrecked in 1789.

== Career ==
The vessel that became Salisbury was launched at Havana, c.1761. She entered Lloyd's Register (LR) in 1781 as Salisbury. Her master was J.Burrows, her owner G.Gibbons, and her trade Portsmouth–Jamaica.

Year	Master	Owner	Trade	Source & notes
1782	J.Bussouxs; K.Relden; G.Stupart	Gibbons	Cowes–Jamaica	LR; large repair 1782
1784	G.Stuppart	Gibbons	London–Jamaica	LR; rebuilt 1776 & large repair 1782

LR for 1785 is not available online. In 1786 Rebecca appeared with the notation that she was the former Salisbury. Her master was J.Barham, her owner J.Menetone, and her trade London–Greenland.

Rebecca became Harpooner in 1787. Her owner was Robert Mann, her owner Olive & Co., and her trade London-Davis Strait. The entry referred to her being named Rebecca in 1781, having been built in 1761, and repaired in 1782, 1785, and 1787.

On 20 July 1787 Lloyd's List (LL) published a report from Davis Strait that listed the whalers there and their catch. Of 24 vessels still there, Harpooner, Mann, master, was one of only two that had caught nothing.

== Fate ==
Harpooner was lost in 1789 on the coast near Cherbourg while coming from St Ubes.
