= Harpooned =

2008 video game

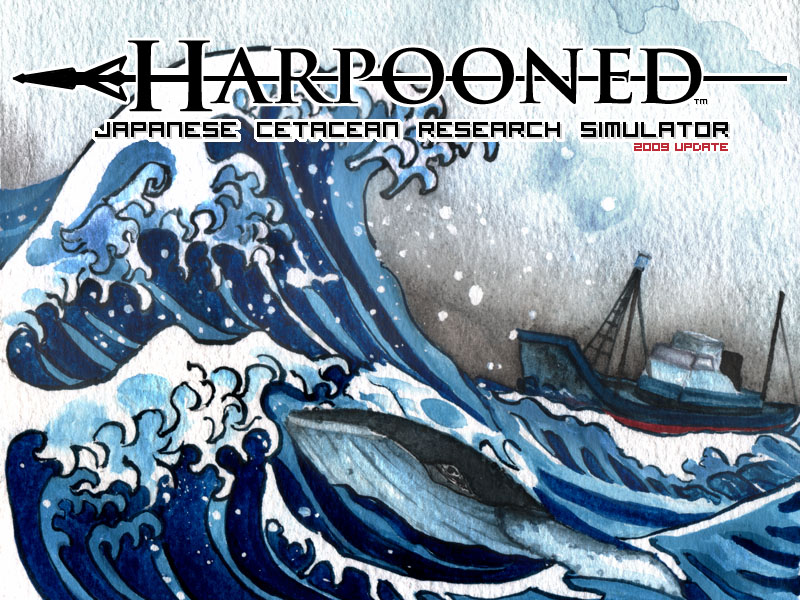
- Developer: Conor O'Kane
- Engine: Torque Game Builder
- Platforms: Windows, Macintosh
- Release: 2008
- Genres: Shoot 'em up, serious game

Harpooned is a video game by Australia-based Irish developer Conor O'Kane for Windows and Macintosh computers. It is a serious game which questions the Japanese government's claim that their whaling program is scientific in nature. The game's website describes Harpooned as a "Cetacean Research Simulator, where you play the role of a Japanese scientist performing research on whales around Antarctica".

== Gameplay ==
The player controls a Japanese whaling vessel. The game opens with the instruction "Perform research on the whales by shooting them with your explosive harpoons". After killing a whale the ship collects its meat and the player is rewarded with a higher score for collecting more meat before a timer runs out, triggering a "scientific combo". At the end of each stage the player's ship offloads its meat onto a research vessel which then performs research on the meat, producing various whale-meat products such as pet-food and cosmetics. Additional discoveries are then announced highlighting the hypocrisy of killing vast numbers of whales in the name of science, such as "Juvenine whales are greatly reduced in number. We must kill more pregnant female whales to determine the cause of this reduction".

Hazards that the player must avoid include icebergs, protestors and news helicopters.

The game does not have an ending, however after about fifteen minutes of play there are no more whales remaining and the player finds that they are sailing through the icebergs alone.

== Release ==
Harpooned was first released in January 2008. In 2009 it was updated with new features. The 2009 update included an online leaderboard and the ability to capture protestors. This feature allowed players to recreate the capture of Sea Shepherd protestors Benjamin Potts and Giles Lane who were held on the Japanese whaling vessel the Yushin Maru No. 2 for two days during the 2008 Antarctic campaign.

== Reception ==
Games For Windows Magazine said Harpooned is "...a darkly funny, quality shooter with a soundtrack that's both as sad and energetic as the game itself. This is actually the best possible kind of 'activist' game: one that succeeds not despite its message but because of it".

Harpooned was featured on G4tv's Attack of the Show! as their Number one around the net on January 24, 2008. Olivia Munn said "This is the coolest protest ever... Besides getting the message across, it's actually a fun game".

In a segment on serious games, ABC Television's Good Game show featured an interview with Conor O'Kane, the developer of Harpooned, where they said "Australian serious games aren't just limited to training either, we're also making some of the best social issue games that are taking important messages to the rest of the world."

David Wildgoose of Kotaku wrote "Politics and games rarely mix. But when you add biting satire, actual gameplay and loads and loads of blood, you get the genuinely entertaining Harpooned".

Derek Yu of TIGSource said "Harpooned is a socially conscious shoot 'em up that puts you at the helm of a Japanese whaling boat. It was created by artist Conor O'Kane as a criticism of the Japanese practice of "scientific whaling"... The game definitely argues its point well for the most part, and its message is bolstered by the fact that its production is fantastic and the actual gameplay is challenging and fun".
