= Harpoon (album) =

Studio album by Larkin Grimm
- Released: 4 October 2005
- Recorded: 2005
- Genre: Freak folk, experimental
- Length: 44:52
- Label: Secret Eye

Larkin Grimm chronology
Harpoon (2005)	The Last Tree (2006)

Harpoon is the debut album by Larkin Grimm, released in 2005. Pitchfork's review described it as "delicate, highly stylized folk."

== Track listing ==
1. "Entrance" – 2:27
2. "Going Out" – 2:19
3. "Patch It Up"– 4:58
4. "Pigeon Food" – 1:54
5. "I Am Eating Your Deathly Dreams" – 4:30
6. "One Hundred Men" – 2:45
7. "Future Friend" – 9:05
8. "Go Gently" – 1:00
9. "Harpoon Baptism" – 3:50
10. "I Killed Someone" – 1:20
11. "Don't Come Down, Darkness" – 2:57
12. "Touch Me, Shaping Hands" – 4:27
13. "White Water" – 3:20
