= Extra Life (band) =

American experimental band

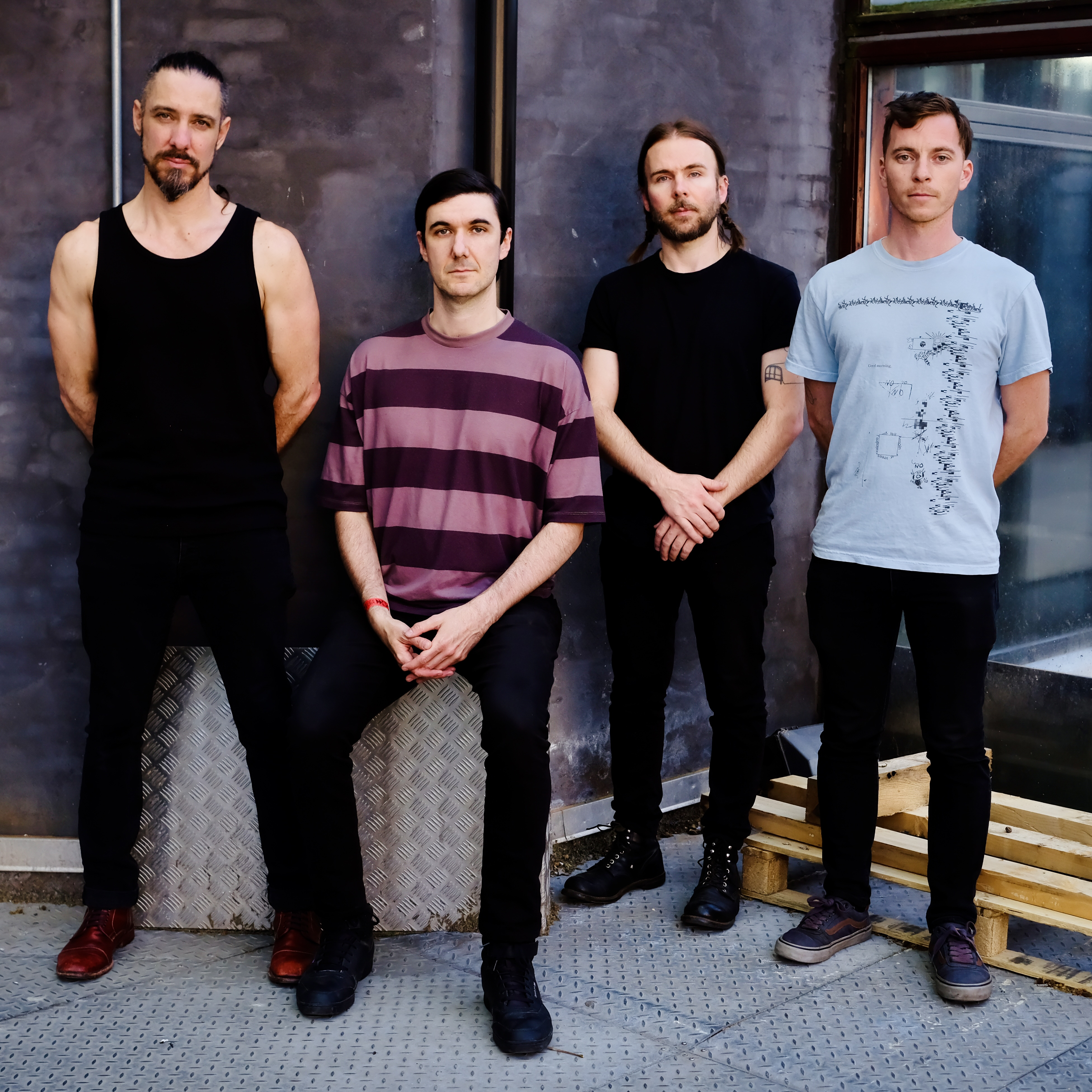
- Extra Life in 2024: Timba Harris, Charlie Looker, Toby Driver, Cameron Wisch.

Background information
- Origin: Brooklyn, New York, U.S.
- Genres: Experimental rock; math rock; progressive rock; avant-pop; neofolk; electronic
- Years active: 2006–2012; 2022–present
- Labels: LoAF; Planaria; Sockets; I & Ear; Shatter Your Leaves; Northern Spy
- Members: Charlie Looker; Toby Driver; Timba Harris; Cameron Wisch
- Past members: David Bodie; Caley Monahon-Ward; Gil Chevigné; Nick Podgurski; Travis Laplante; Tony Gedrich; Ian Antonio; Karen Waltuch
- Website: charlielooker.com

Extra Life is an American experimental band from Brooklyn, New York. Extra Life is known for their unusual rhythms and time signatures and for frontman and composer Charlie Looker's unique singing style, which often uses melisma and is inspired by medieval and Renaissance music.

== History and career ==
Extra Life was initially a project name for Charlie Looker (previously of Zs, Dirty Projectors) and any accompanying artists. Looker composed all of the music for Extra Life's 2008 debut, Secular Works, which featured Looker alongside drummer Ian Antonio, violist Karen Waltuch, and bassist Tony Gedrich. Looker composed most parts on 2010's Made Flesh and 2011's Ripped Heart EP, but the recordings included more collaborative work; by 2012's Dream Seeds, Extra Life had become a trio project, with Caley Monahon-Ward and Nick Podgurski contributing to arrangements and writing their own parts.

Extra Life became known for straddling genres, regularly collaborating live with avant-garde jazz saxophonist Travis Laplante, having songs remixed by Xiu Xiu, and playing alongside bands like black metal project Liturgy. Their second album, Made Flesh, was named one of the best albums of 2010 by The Quietus.

On November 13, 2012, Extra Life officially disbanded, with a statement saying "the inner creative momentum driving the band has stalled."

The band reunited in 2022 to self-release the album Secular Works Vol. 2, featuring a lineup consisting of Looker on voice and guitars, Monahon-Ward on violin and viola, Toby Driver of Kayo Dot on electric bass, and Gil Chevigné on drums and percussion.

In 2024, Extra Life announced their fifth full-length, The Sacred Vowel, with Looker and Driver joined by drummer David Bodie and Timba Harris on violin and viola.

== Discography ==
=== Studio albums and EPs ===
Year	Title	Label	Personnel
2006	Three-Song EP	FuckingA	Charlie Looker, Ian Antonio, Joanne Lin, Nat Baldwin, Sam Hillmer
2008	Extra Life / Nat Baldwin: A Split	Shatter Your Leaves	Looker, Caley Monahon-Ward
2008	Secular Works	Planaria / I & Ear / LoAF	Looker, Antonio, Karen Waltuch, Tony Gedrich
2010	Made Flesh	LoAF / Africantape	Looker, Monahon-Ward, Gedrich, Nick Podgurski, Travis Laplante (ft. Antonio, Larkin Grimm)
2011	Ripped Heart (EP)	Last Things	Looker, Monahon-Ward, Gedrich, Podgurski, Laplante
2012	Dream Seeds	Northern Spy	Looker, Monahon-Ward, Podgurski
2022	Secular Works, Vol. 2	Last Things	Looker, Monahon-Ward, Toby Driver, Gil Chevigné (ft. Nate Wooley, Michael Atkinson)
2024	The Sacred Vowel	Last Things	Looker, Timba Harris, Toby Driver, David Bodie
