= Zs (band) =

American musical group

- Origin: Brooklyn, New York
- Genres: Experimental rock, free jazz, math rock, noise rock, progressive rock
- Years active: 2000–present
- Labels: The Social Registry, Northern Spy, Three One G
- Members: Sam Hillmer; Patrick Higgins; Greg Fox; Michael Beharie
- Past members: Amnon Freidlin; Ian Antonio; Ben Greenberg; Alex Mincek; Charlie Looker; Matthew Hough; Tony Lowe; Brad Wentworth

Zs (pronounced /ziːz/) is a Brooklyn, New York-based experimental band. Since the band's inception, Zs has incarnated as everything from a sextet to a duo, now solidified into the quartet of Patrick Higgins (electric guitar), Greg Fox (percussion), Sam Hillmer (tenor saxophone) and Michael Beharie (electronics). While Zs' music has been variously categorized as no wave, noise, post-minimalist, drone, and psych, it is primarily concerned with making music that challenges the physical and mental limitations of both performer and listener. The band has been heralded by The New York Times as "one of the strongest avant-garde bands in New York."

== Biography ==
Zs was founded in 2000 by tenor saxophonist and composer Sam Hillmer. In 2003, the group (as Alex Hoskins, Brad Wentworth, Charlie Looker, Matthew Hough, Alex Mincek and Sam Hillmer) released Untitled, a two-track written by Looker released on Ricecontrol Records. In July of the same year, the band released Zs, recorded at Westbeth Studios, in New York City, consisting of five tracks primarily written by Alex Mincek and Sam Hillmer, the saxophonists. In November of that year, the EP Karate Bump was recorded in Brooklyn. It was later released by Planaria Recordings in March 2005.

Magnet, a single-track CD written by Matthew Hough, was released in December 2005, followed by Buck, released on cassette by Folding Cassettes in 2006 and on CD by Gilgongo Records in 2007. The LP Arms was also released in 2007 by Gilgongo Records and on CD by Planaria.

Zs were thrown into the spotlight on a November 2007 broadcast of the Howard Stern show, in which Stern played tracks from Arms and subsequently started a discussion on avant-garde music, and an impromptu exploration of a list of theoretical questions about what constitutes "music" and why people listen to it. In a particularly memorable moment, while listening to the opening notes of "Woodworking", Stern stated, "it's mood music... if you're in a mental home," later asking, "Do they write this stuff down? Can this be repeated? How do you tell when something's 'good'?" By the end, Stern and his cast had decided to form their own faux-avant-garde ensemble, and talked about trying to open for Zs' upcoming Knitting Factory performance.

"B Is For Burning", a track from Arms, was released as a 7" live recording in two parts in February 2008 by Rock Is Hell records.

In August 2008, Zs and Child Abuse released a split album on Zum records, the A-side of which was the Zs track "In My Dream I Shot A Monk". The cover painting was Incident at the barbecue by John Dwyer.

The same year, The Hard EP was released by Three One G, and received critical acclaim, with Chris Sabbath of the San Francisco Bay Guardian writing, "Zs excels with high marks across the board... each member vents ballistic impulses into one giant movement of astounding precision. Throughout its 15-minute sprawl, [Zs] are so accurate in their delivery that you start to question the laws of memory and begin to wonder if some telepathic device factors into the outfit's formula..."

In April 2009, a remix album was released entitled Zs Remixed. The album contained two tracks remixed by Excepter's Nathan Corbin (Zebrablood), each followed by their original. The remixed songs are "Except When You Don't Because Sometimes You Won't" (which originally appeared on Arms) and "Bump" (which originally appeared on Karate Bump EP).

On July 7, 2009, Zs released its first record for the label The Social Registry. As Zs' first record without longtime member Charlie Looker (who had left to build his band Extra Life), it saw the band explore the possibilities of the studio as a compositional tool for the first time. While none of the music on the album was ever performed live, the band did several short tours of the East Coast and Canada.

In May 2009, Zs played at the Moers Festival, an international jazz festival in Moers, Germany. In December of the same year, Zs played in Madrid and Barcelona as part of the Prima Vera festival. In early 2010, Zs made their first excursion through the southern states of the US, culminating in ten performances at Austin's South By Southwest Festival.

On May 11, 2010, Zs released their second full-length record, New Slaves, also on the Social Registry. The record was celebrated by The New York Times and Pitchfork, and the Village Voice and was named Album of the Year by Tiny Mix Tapes.

In support of the band's longest and most ambitious full-length record, Zs embarked on their first proper European tour. During their summer 2010 European tour, the band performed in 11 countries.

In the spring of 2012, guitarist/composer Patrick Higgins and drummer Greg Fox joined Hillmer, establishing the core trio of Zs' recent period. The summer of 2012 was spent composing the new material which would eventually become Xe, the band's most critically acclaimed record, released in January 2015.

== Current work ==
The new trio made its debut in August 2012 at 285 Kent, in Brooklyn, New York, with Ben Ratliff of The New York Times covering and reviewing the event.

A four-disc retrospective box set was released on the Northern Spy Records label in August 2012. This was followed by the GRAIN EP in April 2013, in which Patrick Higgins and Greg Fox developed experimental electronic music compositions using source recordings of previous incarnations of the ensemble. GRAIN was released to critical acclaim.

In January 2015, Zs released its full-length LP, Xe, on Northern-Spy. The record was the result of two and half years of international touring by the trio. It was recorded without overdubs or edits, live, in full-takes at Future-Past Studios in Hudson, New York, and engineered by Henry Hirsch. Xe was produced by Patrick Higgins and mastered by Heba Kadry of Timeless Mastering. The artwork for the album features custom brass sculptures made for Zs by Tauba Auerbach. Pitchfork Media issued an 8.0 rating to Xe. NPR National Public Radio described Xe as "the group's most radical statement." The Wall Street Journal described the group's performance on Xe as "hypnotic and harsh at once, with an ability to mesmerize while keeping a listener at attention."

Music critic Sasha Frere-Jones named Xe one of the best records of 2015, giving it his highest mark in an article for the Los Angeles Times in December 2015. At year's end, Rolling Stone awarded Xe number 3 on its list of the best avant-garde records of 2015. In 2016, the SF MOMA acquired the album and artwork of Xe for its permanent collection, displaying the full set of Auerbach's works in metal and the record cover, sleeves, and discs at the museum's new building.

Zs latest full-length record, NOTH, was released in February 2018 on the band's SOCIAL NOISE imprint in collaboration with RVNG Intl.'s Commend store. The record's artwork is by Tauba Auerbach. NOTH is the first record to feature Michael Beharie, the ensemble's newest member.

== Members ==
=== Current members ===
- Sam Hillmer – tenor saxophone
- Patrick Higgins – electric guitar, electronics
- Greg Fox – drums, percussion
- Michael Beharie - electronics

=== Past members ===
- Amnon Freidlin – electric guitar
- Ian Antonio – drums, percussion
- Ben Greenberg – electric guitar
- Tony Lowe – electric guitar
- Alex Mincek – tenor saxophone
- Charlie Looker – electric guitar
- Matthew Hough – electric guitar
- Brad Wentworth – drums, percussion

== Discography ==
All information taken from the Zs Discogs page.

=== Studio albums ===
- Zs (CD, album) (Troubleman Unlimited, 2003)
- Buck (cassette, Folding Cassettes, 2005 / CD, Gilgongo Records)
- Arms (CD, Planaria Recordings, 2007 / LP, Gilgongo Records, 2007)
- Remixed (LP) (Planaria Recordings, Sockets, 2009)
- New Slaves (The Social Registry, 2010)
- New Slaves Part II: Essence Implosion! (The Social Registry, 2011)
- Xe (Northern Spy, 2015)
- Noth (Social Noise, 2018)

=== Singles and EPs ===
- Untitled (10", S/Sided, Cle) (Rice Control, 2003)
- Magnet (CDr, Mini) (Planaria Recordings, 2005)
- Karate Bump (CD, EP) (Planaria Recordings, 2005)
- The Hard (EP) (Three One G (31G), 2008)
- Zs/Child Abuse (7", Ltd) (Zum, 2008)
- Untitled (aka "B Is For Burning") (7", single, Ltd, Whi) (Rock Is Hell Records, 2008)
- Music Of The Modern White (12") (The Social Registry, 2009)
- 33 (2x7", EP, Ltd) (Northern Spy, 2011)
- "Grain" (single) (Northern Spy, 2013)

=== Compilations ===
- New Slaves++ (2xCD, Comp) (Powershovel Audio, 2010)
- This Body Will Be A Corpse (M/Stick, Album, Comp, Ltd, Pla) (Parte, 2011)
- Score: The Complete Sextet Works 2002-2007 (4xCD, Comp + Box) (Northern Spy, 2012)

=== Miscellaneous ===
- Four Systems (CDr) (Sockets, 2007)
- Sky Burial (Words+Dreams, 2011)
