= Harpooner (1830 ship) =

British merchantman and whaler 1831–1856

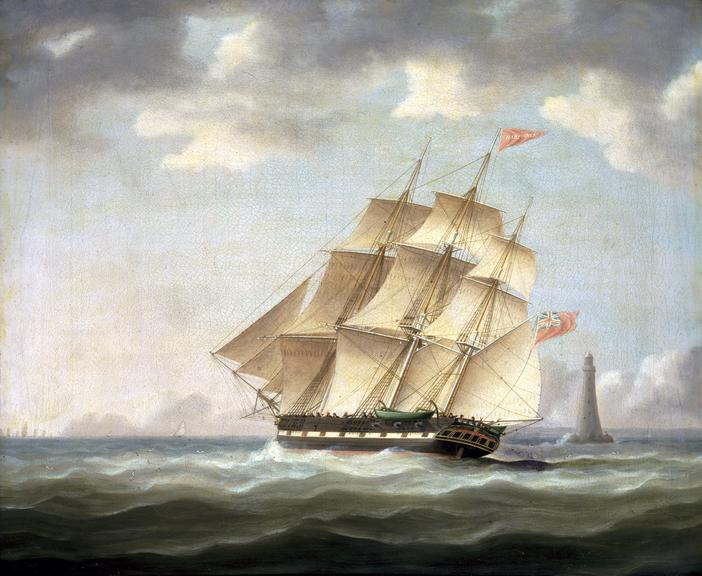
- Whaler Harpooner (c.1830); Science Museum, London; unknown artist

History

United Kingdom
- Name: Harpooner
- Owner: 1830: Green, Wigram's & Green; 1849 (31 October): Samuel Henry Wright, London; 1849: Lewis Morice
- Builder: Green, Wigram's & Green, Blackwall Yard
- Launched: 26 July 1830
- Fate: Wrecked August 1856

General characteristics
- Tons burthen: 398, or 405, or 40520/94 (bm)
- Length: 114 ft 6 in (34.9 m)
- Beam: 27 ft 11 in (8.5 m)
- Sail plan: Barque
- Complement: 32

Harpooner was a barque launched in London in 1830 by Green, Wigram's & Green, at Blackwall. Between 1830 and 1848 she made four voyages to the British southern whale fishery as a whaler. Her voyages resulted in two precedent-setting court cases. The Hudson's Bay Company chartered her from 1848 to 1850 to carry labourers for the settlement on Vancouver Island. In August 1856, she was sailing from Amoy to Ningbo, China when she struck a sunken rock near Ningbo, and was damaged. She was consequently condemned.

== Whaler ==
Harpooner first entered Lloyd's Register (LR) in 1830.

Year	Master	Owner	Trade	Source
1830	Clark	Green&Co.	London–South Seas	LR

1st whaling voyage (1830–1833): Captain John Clark sailed from London on 18 November 1830, bound for the Seychelles. He returned on 6 April 1833 with 550 casks of whale oil.

This voyage resulted in a court case involving oil-merchants refusing to pay for whale oil they had contracted for. On 4 November 1831, Messrs. Field & Thompson engaged with Wigram and Green to purchase half of Harpooner's oil at £68 per ton on her return. Then Field & Thompson on 5 April 1832 contracted for the other half of her cargo at a price of £63 per ton. When Harpooner arrived back at London she had 254 tons 96 gallons of whale oil on board. At the contracted price the cargo was worth £16,661 7s 10d. However, the market price on the day Wigram & Green tendered the oil to Field & Thompson was £51 10s per ton, for a discrepancy of £3,472 1s 3d between the contracted price and the prevailing market price. Field & Thompson refused to honour their contract and declared bankruptcy. The court ultimately decided for the defendants on the basis that the discrepancy represented damages that would have to be litigated in court.

2nd whaling voyage (1833–1836): Captain John Clark sailed from London on 24 September 1833, bound for the Indian Ocean and Timor. He died early in the voyage. Captain Howard returned on 6 December 1836 with 500 casks and four tanks of whale oil.

3rd whaling voyage (1831–1841): Captain Abijah Lock sailed from London on 24 May 1837, bound for Tahiti. At various times Harpooner was reported at Paita, the Galapagos, Talcahuano, and Sydney. She was plagued by desertions, with Captain Lock having had to replenish his crew on several occasions during the course of the 46 months of her voyage. She returned to England on 16 February 1841 with 450 casks of oil, not all of it the higher-value sperm oil.

Harpooner sat in port for some 14 months before sailing on her fourth whaling voyage.

4th whaling voyage (1842–1848): Captain Debney sailed from London on 4 April 1842, bound for Timor. In early 1845 a hurricane damaged Harpooner while she was south of the Solomon Islands. Harpooner lost her mizzen mast and main topmast, sprung her foremast, and lost or damaged all of her boats. She arrived at Sydney on 9 February. While she was undergoing repairs Debney transshipped on a merchant vessel going to London the 1200 barrels of oil Harpooner had gathered. Harpooner sailed on 4 June and by early August she was in New Hebridean waters. In late 1845 she as was at the Bay of Islands, where a number of the crew deserted. Debney had to return to Sydney to recruit more crew. Harpooner was at Hobart in late October 1846 with a cargo of 1350 barrels of sperm oil. In Hobart Debney sought a cargo of freight to carry back to London with the oil. The vessel sailed for London on 14 December 1846, stopping at Adelaide in late December 1846.

In Adelaide, Debney took on more freight, but Harpooner not sail until 18 March 1847, under the command of a new master named Papps. But within days she was forced to seek a sheltered port to recaulk her topsides. She arrived in Sydney on 25 April 1847, for further repairs. She took on 24 passengers and sailed, but had to return 10 days later, leaky. A survey resulted in Harpooner transshipping part of her cargo to enable the vessel to ride higher in the water. Harpooner finally sailed for England, arriving at Swansea on 3 February 1848. A gale drove Harpooner out to sea but did little damage. Harpooner finally sailed for London on 11 February 1848 and arrived on 21 February.

By the time Harpooner returned, the partnership of Green, Wigram's & Green had been wound up. Harpooner was sold.

In Adelaide, Harpooner had taken on board 500 tons of copper ore to be conveyed to Swansea. When she required repairs, the cost of the repairs exceeded her value. Wigrams sought to assign the cost of repairing her for the sake of completing the voyage to the owners of the cargo under a claim of general average. The court found against Wigrams.

== Hudson's Bay Company ==
Year	Master	Owner	Trade	Source
1849	L[ewis] Morice	L.Morice	London–Columbia	LR

In December 1848 the Hudson's Bay Company chartered Harpooner to carry labourers for the settlement on Vancouver Island. She arrived on 31 May 1849 in Victoria, British Columbia with the labourers, miners, carpenters, bakers, and others, including eight settlers that Captain John Marshall Grant had recruited.

Harpooner then sailed to Fort Vancouver and the Sandwich Islands. In August 1850 she left for Fort Rupert. On 10 November Harpooner arrived at Gravesend from Callao.

Year	Master	Owner	Trade	Source & notes
1851	L.Morice	L.Morice	London	LR; large repair 1848 & small repairs 1850

Unfortunately, Morice did not keep Harpooner's entry in LR up-to-date.

In 1852 Harpooner visited British Columbia for a second time. She ran into difficulties while she was in the Sandwich Islands. USS Vandalia provided assistance. Harpooner had been sailing from Callao to Canton when she ran on shore near Honolulu. She put into Honolulu on 16 February.

In 1853 Harpooner was reported sailing from Singapore to Mauritius. From Mauritius she sailed on to London. In 1854 she sailed from London for the Cape of good Hope and Madras.

== Fate ==
In August 1856 Harpooner was sailing from Amoy to Ningbo when she struck a sunken rock near Ningbo, and was damaged. She was consequently condemned.
