= I Want to Work for Diddy season 1 =

I Want to Work for Diddy
- Season 1

Release
- Original network: VH1
- Original release: August 4 – October 6, 2008

Season chronology
- Next → Season 2

I Want to Work for Diddy was a reality show on VH1. Co-executive produced and directed by Mark Jacobs, the 13 contestants are brought together to see who can become Sean Combs' assistant. The show premiered on August 4, 2008. In the end, Suzanne Siegel was chosen to be his assistant, and Mic Barber was hired in an undisclosed role.

== Contestants ==
Name	Occupation	Hometown	Result
Suzanne "Suzi" Siegel	Crime Reporter	The Bronx, New York	Winner on Episode 10
Mic Barber	Banker	New York, New York	Runner-Up on Episode 10
Stefanie Sitzer	Student	Newport Beach, California	Eliminated on Episode 10
Kim "Poprah" Kearney	Entrepreneur	Atlanta, Georgia	Eliminated on Episode 9
Boris Kuperman	Legal Assistant	Sterling, Virginia	Eliminated on Episode 8
Kendra Haffony	Sales Assistant	Willingboro, New Jersey	Eliminated on Episode 8
Redouane Tadjer	Club Promoter	Boston, Massachusetts	Eliminated on Episode 7
Laverne Cox	Hostess	New York, New York	Eliminated on Episode 6
Brianna Davis	Administrative Assistant	Houston, Texas	Eliminated on Episode 4
Deon Sams	Executive Assistant	Los Angeles, California	Eliminated on Episode 3
Rob Smith	Iraq War Veteran	Akron, Ohio	Eliminated on Episode 2
Georgette Cardenas	Mortgage Broker	Miami, Florida	Eliminated on Episode 1
Andrew Long	Personal Trainer	San Diego, California	Eliminated on Episode 1

=== Judges ===
- Kevin Liles – Executive Vice President of Warner Music Group
- Norma – Vice President, Cipriani
- Capricorn Clark – Marketing Director, Sean John
- Phil Robinson – Diddy's former manager

=== Weekly Results ===
Contestants	Episodes										
Contestants	1		2	3	4	5	6	7	8^{[d]}	9	10
Suzanne	9th	Kimberly	Kimberly	Win	Red	Win	Laverne	Red	Win	Safe	WINNER
Mic	1st	Win	Win	Boris	Win	Boris	Win	Win	Kendra	Safe	HIRED
Stefanie	2nd	Win	Win	Boris	Win	Kendra	Win	Red^{[c]}	Kendra	Safe	OUT^{[e]}
Kimberly	13th	Georgette	Rob	Win	Red	Win	Laverne	Win^{[c]}	Win	OUT	
Boris	6th	Win	Win	Deon	Win	Kendra^{[b]}	Win	Win	Kendra		
Kendra	3rd	Win	Win	Boris	Win	Boris^{[b]}	Win	Win	Boris		
Red	10th	Kimberly	Kimberly	Win	Brianna	Win	Kimberly	Stefanie			
Laverne	5th	Win	Win	Boris	Win	Win^{[a]}	Kimberly				
Brianna	11th	Kimberly	Rob	Win	Red						
Deon	4th	Win	Win	Boris							
Rob	7th	Kimberly	Kimberly								
Georgette	8th	Kimberly									
Andrew	OUT										

Teams
The contestant was on the Uptown team.
The contestant was on the Downtown team.
The contestant was not on any team.

Competition
The contestant won.
The contestant was eliminated, but still hired.
The contestant won the challenge and was safe.
The contestant lost the challenge but was safe.
The contestant was eliminated.
The contestant was in the bottom two, but was not eliminated.

Notes
^{^[a]} Laverne was originally on the Downtown Team, but joined the Uptown Team in Episode 5.
^{^[b]} There were no eliminations.
^{^[c]} In Episode 7, Kim and Stefanie switched teams.
^{^[d]} In Episode 8, the teams were Boris & Stefanie, Kendra & Mic and Kim & Suzanne.
^{^[e]} Stefanie was eliminated after the presentations.

== Episodes ==
=== Welcome to Bad Boy ===
First aired August 4, 2008

- Eliminated: Andrew
- Challenge: The Art of Multitasking
  - Downtown: 31 tasks completed
  - Uptown: 31 tasks completed
    - Tiebreaker: Downtown Team was given the win because Uptown Team didn't keep all of their receipts and came up $147.62 short.
- Challenge Winner: Downtown Team
- Bottom 2: Georgette, Kim
- Eliminated: Georgette
- Elimination Notes: The first elimination took place after the personal interviews when teams were being formed. Andrew is eliminated solely based on his breakdancing.

=== No Bitchassness ===
First aired August 11, 2008

- Challenge: No Bitchassness Allowed
  - Tiebreaker: Both teams failed to complete the course; Downtown Team was given the win for being the closest to the end.
- Challenge Winner: Downtown Team
- Bottom 2: Kim, Rob
- Eliminated: Rob

=== Go Get the Model ===
First aired August 18, 2008

- Challenge: Go Find the Model: Create Print Ad for Sean John Eyewear
- Challenge Winner: Uptown Team
- Bottom 2: Boris, Deon
- Eliminated: Deon

=== Diddy.com ===
First aired August 25, 2008

- Challenge: Press Play: The Viral Video Challenge
  - Downtown: 54.6% of total views
  - Uptown: 45.4% of total views
- Challenge Winner: Downtown Team
- Bottom 2: Brianna, Red
- Eliminated: Brianna

=== Hooray for Hollywood ===
First aired September 1, 2008

- Challenge: Hooray for Hollywood: Assist Diddy's Family
- Challenge Winner: Uptown Team
- Bottom 2: Boris, Kendra
- Eliminated: None
- Elimination Notes: Laverne was switched to the Uptown Team.

=== Unforgivable Hustle ===
First aired September 8, 2008

- Challenge: The Unforgivable Hustle
  - Downtown: 15 bottles of perfume sold
  - Uptown: 11 bottles of perfume sold
- Challenge Winner: Downtown Team
- Bottom 2: Kim, Laverne
- Eliminated: Laverne

=== One Night Only ===
First aired September 15, 2008

- Challenge: The Art of Celebration
- Challenge Winner: Downtown Team
- Bottom 2: Red, Stefanie
- Eliminated: Red

=== New York Hustle ===
First aired September 22, 2008

- Challenge: All About the Benjamins: The Money Hustle
  - Boris & Stefanie: $98.64
  - Kendra & Mic: $27.42
  - Kim & Suzanne: $452.86
- Challenge Winners: Kim, Suzanne
- Bottom 2: Boris, Kendra
- Eliminated: Boris, Kendra
- Elimination Notes: Having spared Boris and Kendra from elimination in Episode 5, the judges decided to eliminate both of them.

=== Show Me the Monae ===
First aired September 29, 2008

- Challenge: Plan a Showcase for Janelle Monáe
- Eliminated: Kim
- Elimination Notes: With only four contestants remaining, team competitions were eliminated and it became a 1-versus-all format; Diddy fired Kim after getting into an argument with her.

=== Season Finale ===
First aired October 6, 2008

- Challenge: Plan a Showcase for Janelle Monáe
- Eliminated: Stefanie
- Winner: Mic
- Winner: Suzanne
- Elimination Notes: Stefanie was eliminated after the presentations; Mic was hired in an undisclosed role following his elimination.

== Season 2 ==
A second season of I Want to Work for Diddy was confirmed by VH1. The second season premiered on November 2, 2009.
