= Hopscotch Music Festival =

Annual music festival in Raleigh, North Carolina

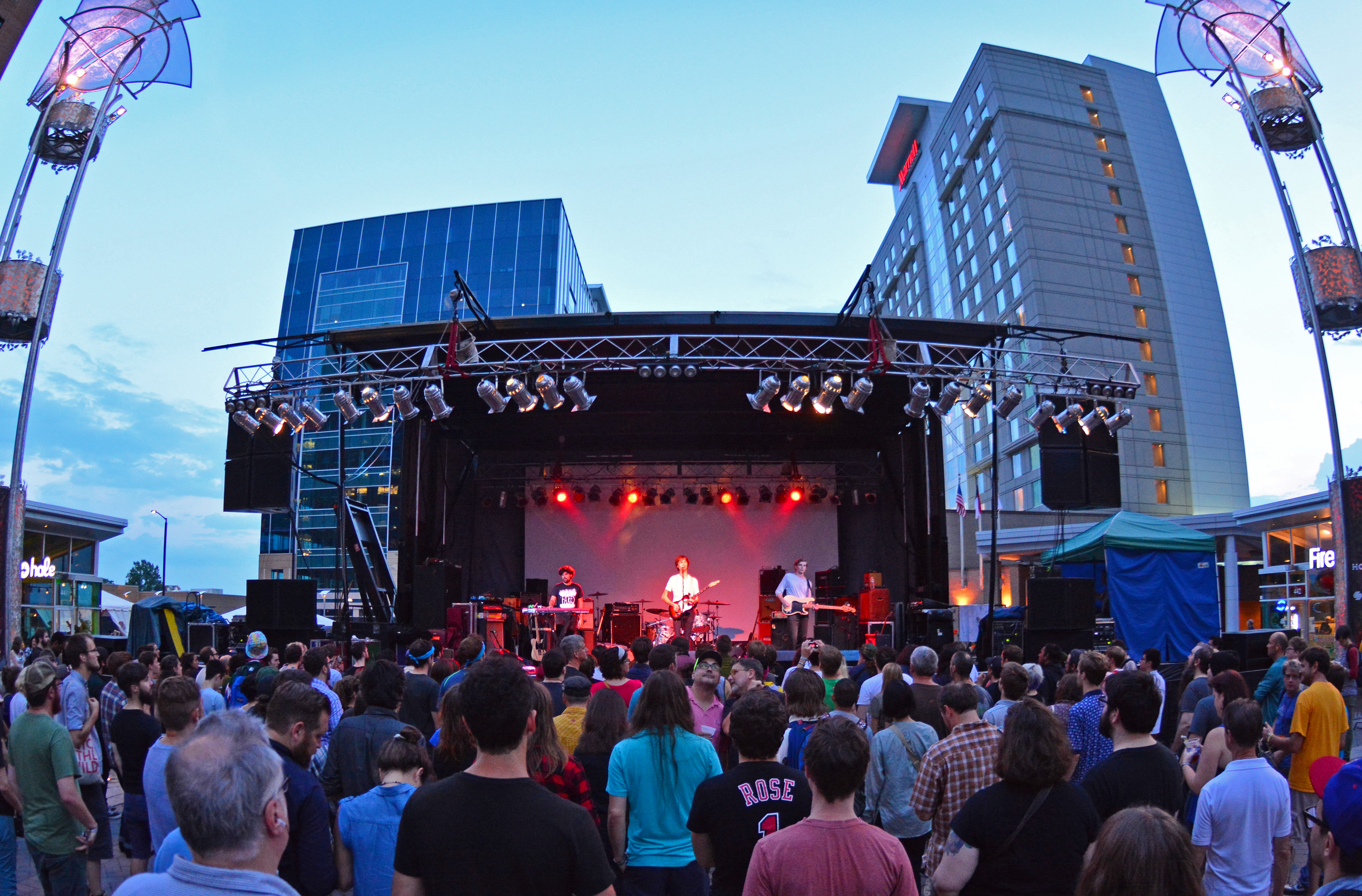
- Dates: September 6–8, 2018
- Locations: Raleigh, North Carolina, U.S.
- Years active: 2010–Present
- Website: hopscotchmusicfest.com

Hopscotch Music Festival is an annual three-day music festival in downtown Raleigh, North Carolina that hosts more than 120 bands. From large outdoor main stages in Raleigh City Plaza and Red Hat Amphitheater to intimate club shows, the festival features music of many genres—rock, hip-hop, metal, folk, electronic, experimental, and more—and its schedule highlights this diversity each year.

== Overview ==
Hopscotch Music Festival is an annual three-day music festival in downtown Raleigh, North Carolina, United States.

Other festival features include:

- The Hopscotch Design Festival, launched in 2014, is a two-day gathering of designers, thinkers, and makers who work across graphic design, architecture, user-experience design, technology, food, film, music, and more.
- Day parties — Record labels, local promoters, bands, and arts organizations book their own shows that happen throughout the city each afternoon of Hopscotch.
- Organized by local poster artists, POSTERscotch is a festival-long poster exhibition and market. The artists sell their work onsite and keep all of the proceeds.
- SiteWork is an emerging artist-led cooperative providing exhibition opportunities and facilitating new projects in Raleigh, Durham and Chapel Hill. SiteWork connects disparate ideas and constituencies, forging new physical and conceptual sites for contemporary art in a rapidly changing Southern cultural landscape. SiteWork exhibitions take place throughout Raleigh during the festival.

== History ==
Hopscotch was founded by Greg Lowenhagen and Grayson Currin while they worked for Steve Schewel at Indy Week, a local alternative weekly newspaper and media company. In 2015, Lowenhagen and Schewel sold the festival to Hopscotch Presents, LLC, a partnership between Travis Janovich, the founder of Etix, and co-owners Paul Laughter and Ben Wingrove.

=== 2010 ===
The first Hopscotch Music Festival took place September 9–11, 2010. It featured 130 bands in 10 venues.

The headliners were hip-hop group, Public Enemy, with Los Angeles trio No Age and Raleigh's the Love Language (Saturday) and indie rock giants Panda Bear and Broken Social Scene with Raleigh's the Rosebuds (Friday). A surprise performance by Raleigh's Helping Hand Mission Marching Band electrified the audience prior to Public Enemy's performance.

Coverage of the 2010 festival included:

- Rolling Stone, "Public Enemy, Broken Social Scene Lead Hopscotch Fest"
  - "This is something that's in front of your face," said Chuck D of the Hopscotch concept. "And when it's done well, it makes people say, 'Shit, maybe this is what it's about anyway."
  - "We've had a scene in North Carolina for a very long time," said 9th Wonder, taking a breather between events in his hotel room on Saturday. He's referring not just to NC's hip-hop scene, but also its indie-rock bands, centered around Chapel Hill's Merge label for the past two decades. "There's been ups and there's been downs, from the hip-hop side to the rock side, but Hopscotch brings it all together and brings validity to it."
- Paste Magazine, "Hopscotch Festival 2010 Greatest Hits"
  - My favorite part was the energy of a crowd out to see some music. Nothing was going to stop them from seeing music. They were going to see all the music. That sheer determination converted me: I slipped into the crowd and immediately abandoned all pretense of maintaining an academic disinterest in the bands I'd only heard of peripherally. It swept away my staunch decision to maintain no bias when seeing a band I kind of love right now.
- 521studies, "Hopscotch Music Festival 2010 recap video"
- Pricefilms, "9th Wonder Night at Hopscotch" (video)
- New Raleigh, "New Raleigh Does Hopscotch: Day One"
  - Based on our New Raleigh staff's experience, the first night of Hopscotch was a crazy mess of success!
  - One of the really nice things about the fest so far is that the bands all seem to be playing right on schedule. So, none of the normal guessing games of what the "real" set time will be: Hopscotch set a time frame and they're sticking to it.
- New Raleigh, "Hopscotch Highlights"
  - In a weekend in which I heard "best weekend ever" uttered a record number of times, how do you pinpoint the most epic of moments? Everything about that weekend was beautiful.
  - A huge cultural event for the downtown, commercially driven, and beautifully organized for attendees.
  - Raleigh will never be the same after last weekend.
- New Raleigh, "Hopscotch, Visually"
- New Raleigh, "Hopscotch Videos from Lloyd Hammarlund"
- Music.MyNC.com, "Hopscotch Night 1: The Wait Is Over, And It's Good!"
- Music.MyNC.com, "Hopscotch Night 2: Broken Social Scene Wins The Night"
- Music.MyNC.com, "Hopscotch Night 3: 'As Perfect As It Could Be'"
- Flickr group pool, "Hopscotch Music Festival 2010"
- Independent Weekly (the festival organizer), Hopscotch Music Festival article archives

The complete lineup was: 9th Wonder, Active Child, Actual Proof, Akron/Family, All Tiny Creatures, American Aquarium, Americans in France, Aminal, Aquarelle, Atlas Sound, The Away Team, Balmorhea, Bear in Heaven, Bellafea, Best Coast, Big Remo, Birds of Avalon, Black Congo NC, Bowerbirds, DJ George Brazil, Bright Young Things, Broken Social Scene, Brutal Knights, Richard Buckner, Burning Star Core, Cannabis Corpse, Caitlin Cary's Small Ponds with Tres Chicas, Collections of Colonies of Bees, Cults, Greg Davis, Dex Romweber Duo, Double Dagger, Double Negative, Dungen, The Dynamite Brothers, EAR PWR, ExMonkeys, First Rate People, Floating Action, Followed by Static, Ben Frost, Fucked Up, Future Islands, Glissade, Golden Boys, The Golden Filter, Goner, Gray Young, Ryan Gustafson, Hammer No More the Fingers, Harlem, Harvey Milk, Horseback, John Howie Jr. & The Rosewood Bluff, In the Year of the Pig, I Was Totally Destroying It, Javelin, Jeb Bishop Trio, Juan Huevos, Kaze, K-Hill, Kill the Noise, The Kingsbury Manx, Kooley High, Kylesa, The Light Pines, Locrian, Lonnie Walker, The Love Language, Lucero, Luego, Max Indian, Erin McKeown, Megafaun, DJ Merlin, Midtown Dickens, The Moaners, The Monologue Bombs, Motor Skills, Mountains, Jon Mueller, Marissa Nadler, No Age, NOMO, Ocean, Old Bricks, Panda Bear, Pattern Is Movement, Pictureplane, Plague, Pontiak, Public Enemy, Raekwon, Rapsody, The Remix Project, The Rosebuds, Ned Rothenberg, DJ Sami Automatic, Schooner, Sightings, Sleepy Sun, spcl gst, Spider Bags, Thien, Tigercity, Tortoise, Treasure Fingers, Tyler Woods, US Christmas, Sharon Van Etten, Veelee, Vincent Black Shadow, War on Drugs, Washed Out, Weedeater, Wet Mango, Whatever Brains, The White Cascade, Keith Fullerton Whitman, Woods, Yip-Yip.

=== 2011 ===
The second Hopscotch Music Festival took place September 8–10, 2011. It featured 150 bands in 13 venues.

The headliners were The Flaming Lips with Superchunk and Dreamers of the Ghetto (Saturday) and Guided By Voices with Drive-By Truckers and The Dodos (Friday).

Coverage of the 2011 festival included:

- USA Today, "Looking for a hip, new music fest? Try Hopscotch"
  - "It turns out the Hopscotch Music Festival is a huge reason to head down to Raleigh, N.C., in a few weeks. [... It] sounds like a not-to-miss weekend."
- Spin, "8 Best Moments of Hopscotch Festival"
  - "'How much control do we have over the disco ball?' singer-songwriter John Vanderslice asked onstage at the Berkeley Cafe on Friday night. Someone flicked a switch and the room filled with color, to the delighted oohs and aahs of the crowd."
- News & Observer, "Hopscotch: perfection, indeed"
  - "It is the nature of events like the Hopscotch Music Festival to either grow to oversized proportions, or wither and die. If Hopscotch's organizers could somehow bottle it and keep the festival right at this year's size indefinitely, that would be a very fine thing because it's really been perfect so far. The clubs have been crowded, but mostly not too crowded, with a great energy at shows around town and out on the street. Hopscotch has brought together a wonderful sense of critical mass -- the feeling that there's not only a lot of people on the town to hear music, but the right people."
- Mountain Xpress, "Hopscotchin' in Raleigh"
  - "The festival is like a younger cousin to SXSW or CMJ. It's loaded with afternoon label showcases and corporate parties, then the official performances at a dozen venues across town. However, where the enormity of cities like Austin or New York make it all but impossible to jump between bars without spending your entire festival en route, Hopscotch is small enough that skipping between shows actually makes sense. Plus, roaming the streets between can't-miss acts leaves lots of time to run into new friends, get sidetracked into unexpected shows or end up on a random adventure. And there was plenty of that."

The complete lineup was: All Tiny Creatures, Andrew Cedermark, Annuals, Apache Dropout, Apex Manor, Apple Juice Kid, Bandway, Barn Owl, Bass Drum of Death, Beach Fossils, Beans, Bird Peterson, Black Lips, Black Twig Pickers, Bombadil, Braids, Brain F≠, Budos Band, Bustello, Caltrop, Carlitta Durand, Cassis Orange, Charlie Smarts, Cheveu, Cheyenne Marie Mize, Chip Robinson, Cold Cave, Coliseum, D&D Sluggers, D-Town Brass, Dan Melchior Und Das Menace, David Daniell, Dawn Golden and Rosy, Cross, Des Ark, Diamond Rings, Dinosaur Feathers, Disappears, DJ Thien, Dreamers of the Ghetto, Drive-By Truckers, Duane Pitre Sextet, Dustin Wong, Dylan Gilbert, Earth, Embarrassing Fruits, Empress Hotel, Eric Carbonara & Jesse Sparhawk, Family Dynamics, Fan Modine, Fight the Big Bull, Filthybird, Flight, Ford & Lopatin, Frank Fairfield, Frontier Ruckus, Future Islands, Gauntlet Hair, Generationals, Grandchildren, Gross Ghost, Guided by Voices, Heads on Sticks, Hog, Horseback, Hospitality, Invisible Hand, J Mascis, Jack the Radio, Japandroids, JEFF The Brotherhood, Jennyanykind, John Vanderslice, Jon Lindsay, Julianna Barwick, Justin Robinson and The Mary Annettes, King Mez, KORT, Krallice, L.E.G.A.C.Y., Last Year's Men, Le Weekend, Little Scream, Liturgy, Lonnie Walker, Lost in the Trees, Lower Dens, Man Will Destroy Himself, Man/Miracle, Mandolin Orange, Mount Eerie, Mount Moriah, Mouthus, North Elementary, Old Bricks, Oneohtrix Point Never, Onward Soldiers, Organos, Oulipo, Oxbow, PC Worship, Pepper Rabbit, Peter Lamb and The Wolves, Prurient, Reading Rainbow, Rhys Chatham, Royal Bangs, Royal Baths, Shit Horse, Sir Richard Bishop, Soft Company, SPCL GST, Spider Bags, Steve Gunn, Super Vacations, Superchunk, Swans, Temperance League, Tender Fruit, The Body, The Caribbean, The Dodos, The Flaming Lips, The Foreign Exchange, The Hairs, The Light Pines, The Loners, The Love Language, The Men, The Moderate, The Necks, The Old Ceremony, The Prayers and Tears, The Strugglers/ Brice Randall Bickford, The Tomahawks, Times New Viking, Titus Andronicus, Toro Y Moi, Twelve Thousand Armies, Twin Shadow, Tyvek, Unknown Mortal Orchestra, Vivian Girls, Weekend, Wembley, Wesley Wolfe, Whatever Brains, White Ring, William Tyler, Wooden Wand, Woodsman, Xiu Xiu, XRay Eyeballs, Yair Yona.

=== 2012 ===
The third Hopscotch Music Festival took place September 6–8, 2012. It featured 175 bands in 15 venues.

The headliners were The Roots, Escort (whose performance was canceled due to severe weather) and Shirlette & The Dynamite Brothers (Saturday) and The Jesus and Mary Chain, Built to Spill and Zammuto (Friday).

The complete lineup was: The Roots, The Jesus and Mary Chain, Built To Spill, Yo La Tengo, Liars, Sunn O))), Zola Jesus, Thee Oh Sees, Danny Brown, Deerhoof, Escort, The Mountain Goats, Baroness, Wye Oak, Flosstradamus, Lambchop, Killer Mike, Dan Deacon, Corrosion of Conformity, Colin Stetson, The dB's, G-Side, Pallbearer, Julia Holter, Versus, NOBUNNY, The Spits, Exitmusic, Oneida, Hundred Waters, Balam Acab, Arnold Dreyblatt & Megafaun, Valient Thorr, Matthew E. White: One Incantation Under God, Bio Ritmo, Young Magic, J Roddy Walston and the Business, Mirel Wagner, Oren Ambarchi, Ducktails, Damien Jurado, Zammuto, Nails, Papa M/David Pajo, Ital, Laurel Halo, Hacienda, Nick Catchdubs, Jackie Chain, Delicate Steve, Class Actress, Holograms, Screaming Females, Chris Corsano, Glenn Jones, Sister Crayon, Altar of Plagues, Samantha Crain, Pop. 1280, Cities Aviv, The Atlas Moth, Secret Cities, Mac McCaughan, White Hills, Doldrums, Azure Ray, Boy Friend, Odonis Odonis, Amen Dunes, Big Troubles, Cheater Slicks, Dope Body, The Weather Station, Sutekh Hexen, Silver Swans, Carlos Giffoni, Co La, Baobab, Birds of Avalon, Mark McGuire, Withered, Shovels & Rope, Donovan Quinn, Alvarius B., Starlings TN, My Best Fiend, Altos, Frustrations, Hiss Golden Messenger, Kevin Drumm, Bill Orcutt, No BS! Brass Band, Charlie Parr, Hubble, Roman Candle, Chelsea Crowell, Chris Forsyth & Koen Holtkamp, Chuck Johnson, Field Report, Tenement, Jacaszek, The Band in Heaven, Zeus, Elephant Micah, Whatever Brains, Roomrunner, Guardian Alien, Shirlette & The Dynamite Brothers, Nerves Junior, Midtown Dickens, Heads on Sticks, Jon Mueller's Death Blues, Jane Jane Pollock, Work Clothes, Pipe, TOW3RS, Black Skies, Gross Ghost, Quiet Evenings, Kenny Roby, Shark Quest, Guinea Worms, Secret Mountains, Naked Gods, Wowser Bowser, The Hot at Nights, Nests, MAKE, The Beast, Say Brother, Michael Rank & STAG, Paint Fumes, The Beat Report, Flesh Wounds, Airstrip, Wood Ear, The Lizzy Ross Band, Little Hollow, Mark Holland, Lilac Shadows, The Future Kings Of Nowhere, Phil Cook & His Feat, The Bronzed Chorus, Burglar Fucker, Young and in the Way, Hume, Vattnet Viskar, Sinful Savage Tigers, Free Electric State, Curtis Eller, Cantwell Gomez & Jordan, J Kutchma & The Five Fifths, Charles Latham, Toon & The Real Laww, Grohg, Calico Haunts, Drique London, Joint D≠, The Toddlers, Minor Stars, Lazy Janes, Wylie Hunter & The Cazadores, Tom Maxwell, Left Outlet, Jenny Besetzt, Savage Knights, Tomas Phillips & Craig Hilton, Feltbattery, Some Army, Zack Mexico.

=== 2013 ===
The fourth Hopscotch Music Festival took place September 5–7, 2013. It featured 175 bands in 15 venues.

The complete lineup was: A-Trak, Adult., Ahleuchatistas, Airstrip, Alexander Turnquist, Alpoko Don, Ama Divers, American Aquarium, Amor de Días, Angel Olsen, Arborea, ASG, Ashrae Fax, Beloved Binge, Big Black Delta, Big Daddy Kane, Bitter Resolve, Black Zinfandel, Body Games, Boyzone, Broken Prayer, Califone, Casual Curious, Cesar Comanche, Charalambides, Charlemagne Palestine, Chatham County Line, Cian Nugent, Co., Coke Bust, Cy Dune, Dan Friel, Daniel Bachman, Dauwd, David Grubbs, Deleted Scenes, Diali Cissokho & Kaira Ba, DJ PayPal, Double Negative, Doug Paisley, Drug Yacht, Dub Addis, Earl Sweatshirt, Endless Boogie, Eros and the Eschaton, Estrangers, Evoken, Ex Cops, Ex-Cult, Expo '70, Fat Tony, Foot Village, Future Islands, Golden Void, Gorguts, Gross Ghost, Grouper, Helado Negro, High Aura'd, High Highs, High Wolf, Holly Herndon, Holy Ghost!, Horse Lords, Houses, Ilyas Ahmed, Inter Arma, Ironing Board Sam, Jamaican Queens, Jeanne Jolly, John Cale, Jonathan Kane's February, Katharine Whalen, Ken Vandermark & Tim Daisy Duo, Kopecky Family Band, Kurt Vile and the Violators, Lady Lamb The Beekeeper, Lapalux, Last Year's Men, Late Bloomer, Leech, Libraness, Local Natives, Loincloth, Lonnie Holley, Low, Magik Markers, Majical Cloudz, Malcolm Holcombe, Maple Stave, Marnie Stern, Matmos, Matthew Dear, Melissa Swingle, Merzbow, Midnight Plus One, Mikal Cronin, Mike Shiflet, Morning Brigade, Mount Moriah, Nathan Bowles, Nightlands, Noise Trauma, Oblivians, Old Quarter, Overmountain Men, OXYxMORON, Pelt, Pere Ubu, Pharmakon, Pig Destroyer, Pissed Jeans, Plume Giant, Protomartyr, Prypyat, Purling Hiss, Regina Hexaphone, Richard Bacchus & the Luckiest Girls, Richard Youngs, Riton, Rose Windows, Ryan Gustafson's The Dead Tongues, Ryan Hemsworth, Saints Apollo, San Fermin, Schooner, Shannon Whitworth, Shirlette Ammons T4GB, Slavic Soul Party!, Sleep, Solar Halos, Spacin', Speedy Ortiz, Spiritualized, Spooky Woods, Survival, Suuns, Swearin', Sylvan Esso, Terry Anderson and the Olympic Ass-Kickin Team, The Backsliders, The Beets, The Breeders, The Dreebs, The Everymen, The Human Eyes, The Kingsbury Manx, The Lollipops, The Rosebuds, The Shilohs, The South Carolina Broadcasters, Toddlers, Tonk, Torres, Turf War, Twilighter, UBT, Villages, Water Liars, Waumiss, Waxahatchee, Whatever Brains, Wichita Falls, Wold, Wolf Eyes, WOOL, Xiu Xiu, XXYYXX, Zen Frisbee.

=== 2014 ===
The fifth Hopscotch Music Festival took place September 4–6, 2014. It featured over 140 bands in 12 venues.

Acts included: IIII, 6 String Drag, Alexandra Sauser-Monnig, American Aquarium, Artificial Brain, Author & Punisher, Axxa/Abbraxas, Ava Luna, Avers, Bedowyn, Blanko Basnet, Blursome, Body Games, Canine Heart Sounds, Coke Weed, Cousins, Dark Rooms, Davidians, Dead Gaze, Demon Eye, Deniro Farrar, Dent May, Diarrhea Planet, Drag Sounds, Death, Eagulls, Ed Schrader's Music Beat, Enemy Waves, First Person Plural, Freeman, Free Clinic, Gems, Ghostt Bllonde, Guerilla Toss, Helm, High On Fire, Holygrailers, How To Dress Well, Jacuzzi Boys, Jamie XX, Joe Scudda, KEN mode, Krill, Last Year's Men, Landlady, Lee Noble, Loamlands, Lonnie Walker, Lunice, Mark McGuire, Marley Carroll, Mapei, Mastodon, Matt Kivel, Matt Northrup, Mas Ysa, Museum Mouth, Mutual Benefit, Nest Egg, New Music Raleigh Presents: Future Shock, NC Music Love Army (Jon Lindsay + Caitlin Cary), Nik Turner's Hawkwind, No Eyes, No Love, Obnox, Octopus Jones, Open Mike Eagle, Potty Mouth, Power Trip, Palehound, Paperhaus, Phosphorescent Solo, Prince Rama, Reigning Sound, Ryley Walker, Saint Rich, Screature, See Gulls, Soft Cat, Solar Halos, Spoon, Strange Faces, St. Vincent, SubRosa, Sun Araw, Sun Club, Sun Kil Moon, The Haxan Cloak, The Nervous Ticks, The Tills, The Range, The White Octave, Thurston Moore, Tony Conrad, T0W3RS, Valient Thorr, Virgins Family Band, Walin’ Storms, Well$, White Lung, White Laces, Wild Fur, Wing Dam, Winston Facials, Witch Mountain, Wowolfol, Y’ALL, Young Cardinals, YVETTE, Zack Mexico,

=== 2015 ===
The sixth Hopscotch Music Festival took place September 10–12, 2015 It featured over 139 bands in 12 venues.

Ace Henderson, Acid Chaperone, Advaeta, American Aquarium, Ameriglow, Axis: Sova, Bandages, BATTLES, Big Ups, Birds of Avalon, Black Clouds, Blaxxx, Booher, Boulevards, Breathers, Bully, Cakes Da Killa, Carlitta Durand, CASHMERE CAT, Chaz French, CHELSEA WOLFE, Choked Out, Chulo, Clang Quartet, CLARK, Cloud Becomes Your Hand, Dad & Dad, Daniel Romano, DJ Earl, Dorthia Cottrell, Drippy Inputs, Dwight Yoakam, EARTHEATER, Echo Courts, Elisa Ambrogio, Escher, Eyes Low, Father, FaultsFlock of Dimes, Fórn, GODFLESH, Godspeed You! Black Emperor, GoldLink, Grand Champeen, Grandma Sparrow, Hank Wood & The Hammerheads, Hanz, Hecta, Ian William Craig, Iron Reagan, Jake Xerxes Fussell, Jefre Cantu-Ledesma, Jenks Miller & Rose Cross NC, Jenny Hval, Jessica Pratt, Jubilee, Keath Mead, King Gizzard & The Lizard Wizard, Las Rosas, Lawrence English, LE1F, Leapling, Less Western, Leverage Models, Lilac Shadows, LIZZO, Lost Trail, Loud Boyz, Lud, Luxe Posh, Lydia Loveless, Mac Mccaughan, Mamiffer, Mary Lattimore & Jeff Zeigler, May Erwin, Microkingdom, Mitski, Moenda, MOON DUO, Morbids, Mumdance, Must Be The Holy Ghost, Naked Naps, NATALIE PRASS WITH SPECIAL GUESTS, Nathan Golub, Natural Causes, New Music Raleigh: Music by Oscar Bettison and Evan Ziporyn, Nick James, No Love, Nocando, Nots, Obey City, OBN IIIS, OLD MAN GLOOM, Ought, Oulipo, Outer Spaces, Patois Counselors, PHIL COOK PRESENTS “SOUTHLAND MISSION”, Pile, Pill, Porches, Prurient, Pusha T, River Whyless, ROKY ERICKSON, Sanhet, Sarah Louise, Secret Boyfriend, Sheer Mag, Shitty Boots, Silent Lunch, Skyblew, SMLH, Solar Halos, Some Army, Soon, Steve Gunn & The Black Twig Pickers, Tashi Dorji, Thefacesblur, Tombs, TV on the Radio, TYCHO, TZYVYX, Vibekillers, Wahyas, Warehouse, Waxahatchee (solo), Wildhoney, Wizard Rifle, WOVENHAND, Wymyns Prysyn, X, Yandrew, Zack Mexico, Zeena Parkins, ZS

=== 2016 ===
The seventh annual Hopscotch Music Festival took place September 8–10, 2016.

75 Dollar Bill, A Giant Dog, Ace Henderson, Adia Victoria, Al Riggs, All Dogs, Amanda X, Anderson .Paak & The Free Nationals, Andrew Bird, Angelo Mota, Bad Friends, Baroness, Battle Trance, Beach House, Beach Slang, Big Freedia, blursome, Bodykit, Bond St. District, Boulevards, C/\L/\PSE, Car Seat Headrest, Charming Youngsters, Cobalt, Container, Converge, Crete, Cross Record, Crumme, Dai Burger, Damon/Dorji Duo, Daniel Bachman & Friends, Demdike Stare, Diet Cig, DJ Spinn & The Era Footwork Crew, Don Bikoff, Downtown Boys, Dynamite Brothers, Earthling, Earthly, Eldritch Horror, Eric Bachmann, Erykah Badu, ET Anderson, fk mt., Gary Clark Jr., Grohg, Gun Outfit, Hotline, HOUSEFIRE, Inga Copeland, Joan Shelley, Jodi, Julien Baker, Junglepussy, Kelela, Kid Millions & Jim Sauter, Kingdom, Konvoi, Kooley High, Lacy Jags, Lambchop, Lavender Country, Leila Abdul-Rauf and Nathan A. Verrill, LVL UP, Maiden Radio, Make, Man Forever, Milo, Mr. Carmack, Mutoid Man, Nance, Necrocosm, No One Mind, Oak City Slums, Occultist, Palm, Pie Face Girls, Pink Flag, Promised Land Sound, Quilt, Rabit, Rainbow Kitten Surprise, Red Sea, Ricky Eat Acid, S.E. Ward, Sarah Shook & The Disarmers, Secret Guest, Sneakers, Sneaks, Soldiers of Fortune, Stooges Brass Band, Suzi Analogue, Swizzymack, Sylvan Esso, Television, The Coathangers, The Dead Tongues, The Dinwiddies, The Hell No, The Powder Room, The Snails, The Wyrms, Tom Carter, Treee City, Tribulation, Tuskha, Twin Peaks, Vhöl, Vincas, Vince Staples, Voight-Kampff, Weird Pennies, Well$, Wiki, William Basinski, Wing Dam, Wolf Parade, Wume, Wye Oak, YOB, Young Thug, Youth Code, Zensofly

=== 2017 ===
The eighth annual Hopscotch Music Festival took place September 7–10, 2017.

Absent Lovers, Acid Chaperone, Acid Reign, Advance Base, Ahleuchatistas, Albert Adams, Aldous Harding, Alessandro Cortini, All the Saints, Ami Dang, Angel Olsen, Arone Dyer's Drone Choir, Aunt Sis, Bask, Bellows, Beverly, Beverly Tender, Big Boi, Big Thief, Birds of Avalon, Blacksage, Blois, Blursome, Body Games, BODYKIT, Boulevards, Boy Harsher, Branchez, BrassiousMonk, Buke and Gase, Busdriver, Cass McCombs Band, Cayetana, Cende, Cherry Glazerr, Chuck Johnson, Cloud Nothings, Cones, Cory Hansen, Dear Nora, Dim Delights, Dylan Earl, Essex Muro, EZTV, Faye, Flock of Dimes, Floor Model, Future Islands, G Yamazawa, gobbinjr, Hand Habits, Happy Abandon, Har Mar Superstar, Hoops, Hurray For The Riff Raff, Iggy Cosky, Japanese Breakfast, Jenny Besetzt, Jock Gang, John Saturley, Jooselord, Kayo Dot, Kaytranada, Kevin Morby, King Woman, Konvoi, Late Bloomer, Lazer Background, Lee Fields & The Expressions, Loamlands, Lunice, Machinedrum, Madame Gandhi, Mannequin Pussy, Margo Price, Marie Davidson, Mary Timony Plays Helium, Melkbelly, METZ, Mineral Girls, Monk Parker, Moon Racer, Mount Eerie, Mount Moriah, MOURN, Mourning Cloak, Museum Mouth, MyBrother MySister, Naked Naps, Natural Velvet, NE-HI, Nest Egg, No One Mind, Noname, Ó, Oddisee & Good Company, Oh Sees, Okey Dokey, P.A.T. Junior, Pallbearer, Peaer, Pharmakon, Pie Face Girls, Preoccupations, Protomartyr, Rafiq Bhatia, Rapsody, Reflex Arc, Richard Lloyd, Run The Jewels, Sand Pact, serpentwithfeet, Severed Fingers, Shane Parish, Shepherds, Sir the Baptist, Skylar Gudasz, Snail Mail, Solange, Songs: Molina, Sound of Ceres, Spaceface, Sunflower Bean, Susto, Tei Shi, The Afghan Whigs, The Brian Jonestown Massacre, The Coke Dares, The Kneads, The Make-Up, The Notekillers, The Tills, The Veldt, Thou, Torche, Totally Slow, Truth Club, Whores, WNC String Ensemble, Yves Tumor, ZenSoFly.

=== 2018 ===
The ninth annual Hopscotch Music Festival September 6–8, 2018.

Abdu Ali, Alex Brown, Anna St Louis, Bang ZZ, Beauty World, Belle And Sebastian, Blanko Basnet, Blueberry, Blue Cactus, Body/Head, Boulevards, Circuit Des Yeux, Combo Chimbita, Deaf Wish, Dex Romweber, Drag Sounds, DVSN, Ed Schrader's Music Beat, Elephant Micah, Escape-ism, Fitness Womxn, Gang Gang Dance, Glenn Jones, Grizzly Bear, Grouper, Hailu Mergia, Heavensend, House And Land, Indigo De Souza, Jennifer Castle, Jessie And The Jinx, Julie Byrne, Lightening Born, Liz-Phair, Lomelda, M8ALLA, MC50, Michael Rault, Miguel, Mind Over Mirrors, MIPSO, Molly Burch, Monolord, Moses Sumney, Nance, Nicolay With The Hot At Nights, NightShop, NoAge, Oceanator, Omni, Ought, Paint Fume, Palberta, Pamela And Her Sons, Patois Counselors, Real Estate, Red Fang, Renata Zeiguer, Romantic States, S. E. Ward, Sara Shook And The Disarmers, Shopping, Sneaks, Space Heater, Speedy Ortiz, Spookstina, Stevie, Still Corners, Swearin', The Jayhawks, The Love Language, The Revolution, The Spirit Of The Beehive, The Yawpers, Thundercat, US Girls, Vacant Company, Warm Bodies, Waxahatchee, Woody, Yamantaka//Sonic Titan, Young Bull, Zack Mexico, Zephaniah Ohora.
