= Msg rcvd =

2012 album by Neptune

msg rcvd

Studio album by Neptune
- Released: March 13, 2012
- Recorded: 2011/2012
- Studio: The Berwick, Boston, Massachusetts
- Genre: Noise rock; experimental; industrial
- Length: 39:27
- Label: Northern Spy Records
- Producer: Kevin Micka / Neptune

msg rcvd is the ninth full-length album by American noise rock band Neptune, released on March 13, 2012 by Northern Spy Records.

== Background ==
The band's website states the album "contains Dark Report, the band's most polarizing song", while one UK reviewer stated "oddball hypno gems like the impressively Can-ish ‘Dark Report’ really pushing the right buttons with me. It’s got that modern post-dub spaciousness paired with lo-fi noisy minimalist compositions for an ethereal, otherworldly ride."

== Reception ==
Craig Johnson of UK-based Louder That War praised the album, as did Scott Scholz in Words on Sounds.

== Packaging ==
‘’msg rcvd’’ was issued worldwide on CD and LP via American avant-garde record label Northern Spy Records. The CD version was released in digipack format. The first 100 vinyl copies were pressed in translucent green vinyl, the remaining were pressed into black vinyl. The cover image is the result of a production error which the band decided to keep.

== Track listing ==
All tracks are written by Neptune.

No.	Title	Length
1.	"luminous skull"	7:55
2.	"dark report"	10:48
3.	"rpr"	2:35
4.	"natural systems"	1:00
5.	"negative reversal"	8:04
6.	"dstl signal"	7:44
Total length:		38:08

== Personnel ==
Neptune

- Jason Sidney Sanford – vocals, guitar, feedback organ, oscillator, radio sequencer, amplified gas can and metal bucket
- Mark William Pearson – guitar, vocals, oscillator organ, sine wave generator
- Kevin Emil Micka – drums, amplified drums, kick oscillator, small feedback organ, electronics

Production

- Kevin Micka – recording, mixing engineer
- Neptune – mixing, production
- Scott Turner Craggs – mastering engineer

Packaging and design

- Jason Sidney Sanford – photography
- Mark William Pearson – artwork, layout
- Adam Downey – artwork, layout
