= Neptune (American band) =

American band

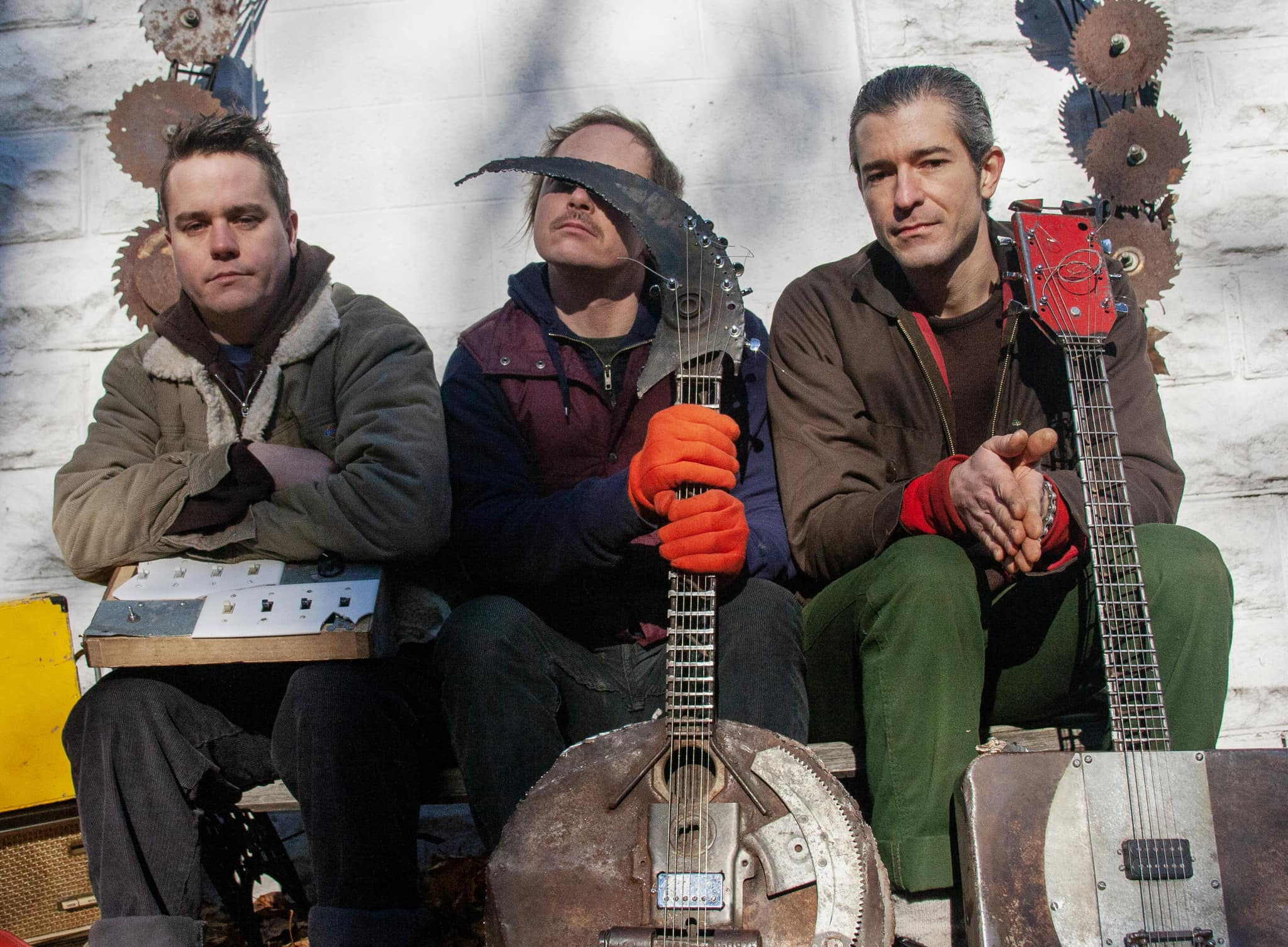
- Current band lineup. Photo by Lindsay Metivier, 2008.

Background information
- Origin: Boston, Massachusetts, United States
- Genres: Noise rock, Avant-garde, Industrial, No wave, Experimental, Electronic, Improvisation
- Years active: 1994–present
- Labels: Table of the Elements, Northern Spy Records, Wrong Way Archival Bureau, Magnetism Crafts, Self-Release Records, Golden Lab, 100% Breakfast, Mister Records, Hiddenbirdhouse, Distile, Archenemy Record Company, NO=FI, Les Potagers Natures, Sleeping Giant Glossolalia
- Members: Jason Sidney Sanford; Mark William Pearson; Daniel Paul Boucher
- Past members: Gregory Kenney; Douglas Last; Darryl Blood; Carl Wieting; Jessica Rylan; Malcolm Felder; Adrianne Jorge; Adam Scotto; Christopher Huggins; Joel Hamburger; Justin Kaiden; John Douglas Manson; Farhad Ebrihimi; Kevin Emil Micka; Jesse Gallagher; Justin Earl Kipp
- Website: neptune-band.com

Neptune is an experimental / industrial noise rock band originally hailing from Boston, Massachusetts. Throughout its 30+ year history, the band has largely operated as a collective, not only by employing a rotating membership, but also often collaborating with other musicians and artists both live and on record. They are noted for having built their custom-made instruments out of scrap steel, found-objects and various other recycled materials. The instruments themselves can be heavy and foreboding "self-made from antiquated machines and scrap metal, forged at extreme angles like props from a German expressionist film." A reviewer once said of the band: "Neptune really do accurately approximate in their music the tragic and violent desolation of the auto graveyards from which they draw their raw materials." While another wrote: "Neptune's closest comparison could only be themselves."

== Band history ==
Neptune's origins trace to 1994 as a sculpture project by Boston artist/musician Jason Sanford, who forged the band's haphazard guitars and reluctant drums from scrap steel and found objects. Over the years the instruments have evolved to incorporate oscillators and other electronic devices as band "have integrated some really smart looking industrial class synthesizer gear" into their noise-making arsenal. Twelve (+) lineups, Thirty-three releases and hundreds of instruments later, the band continues to wrench its sound spatter on self-built instruments to often confounded audiences around the world. As of 2024, the band has played over 700 shows, with a recent US tour in June 2023.

Having toured extensively, Neptune has shared stages with "a variety of artists such as The Ex, Mission of Burma, Ut, Oneida, Lightning Bolt, The Flaming Lips, Blonde Redhead, Melt-Banana, Charles Hayward, Liars, Black Dice, James Chance & the Contortions, Gang Gang Dance, Six Finger Satellite, Wolf Eyes.", Enon, Deerhunter, Erase Errata, Arab on Radar and Parts & Labor.

As of 2020, Neptune again consists of Sanford along with long-time Neptune collaborators Mark William Pearson and Daniel Paul Boucher.

== Personnel ==
Current members

- Jason Sidney Sanford – microtonal guitar, guitar, baritone guitar, bass, violin, gas can ukulele, electric thumb piano, electronics, foot-controlled synthesizer, bass lamellophone, spring harp, percussion, feedback organ, tupperphone, radios, vocals (1994 - present)
- Mark William Pearson – macrotonal guitar-bass, guitar, baritone guitar, 4-string slide, bass, electronics, large electric spring, percussion, amplified drums, tape machine, tape manipulation, push-button telephone, vocals (2001 - 2014, 2015, 2020 - present)
- Daniel Paul Boucher – drums, amplified drums, amplified sawblades, amplified metal toms, found object percussion, saw blade xylophone, oscillators, electronics, violin, gas can ukulele, washboard, vocals (2000 - 2010, 2015, 2020 - present)

Past members / frequent collaborators

- Darryl Blood - drums, violin, backing vocals (1994 - 1997)
- Doug Last - percussion, empties (empty glass bottles shattered on a cinderblock with attached microphone), backing vocals (1994 - 1997)
- Carl Wieting- bass, guitar, ukulele, backing vocals (1994 - 1997)
- Gregory Kenney - guitar, vocals, drums (1994 - 1998)
- Malcolm Felder - drums (1997 - 1998)
- Jessica Rylan - bass, vocals, electronics (1997-1999, 2001, 2006-2007)
- Kevin Micka – recording engineer, live sound engineer (1997 - present), drums, guitar, electronics, backing vocals (2006 - 2016)
- Adrienne Jorge - live projections / films, documentarian (1998 - 1999, 2002 - 2005)
- Adam Scotto - drums (1999)
- Joel Hamburger - bass (2000)
- Christopher Huggins - guitar, vocals, bass (2000 - 2002)
- John Douglas Manson - drums, percussion, vocals (2000 - 2004)
- Justin Kaiden - bass (2001)
- Farhad Ebrihimi - drums, electronics (2007; 2010 - 2011)
- Justin Earl Kipp - percussion, bowed cable, electronics (2016)
- Jesse Gallagher - percussion, bowed cable, electronics (2016)

Collaborators

- David Gerhard Utzinger - live sound engineer (2005), percussion (2008)
- Kenneth Wagner Linehan - homemade synthesizer (2008)
- Regina Greene - vocals (obscenities), management / spiritual guidance (2005 - 2013)
- Mary Staubitz - electronics, tone generator, feedback (2006 - 2007)
- Martina Rossi - guitar (live) (2009)

== Discography ==
Studio albums

- Studio Recordings, May MCMXCVII (Archenemy Records, 1999)
- The Ballet of Process (Mister Records / 100% Breakfast Records, 2002)
- Intimate Lightning (Mister Records / 100% Breakfast Records, 2004)
- Patterns (Self-Release Records (US) / Fortissimo Records (UK) / Les Potagers Natures (France), 2006)
- Neptune (Golden Lab Records (UK), 2007)
- Gong Lake (Radium / Table of the Elements, February 2008)
- 18:40/19:19 (Magnetism Crafts / Wrong Way Archival Bureau, 2010)
- Silent Partner (Northern Spy Records, 2011)
- Msg rcvd (Northern Spy Records, 2012)
- Mother of Millions (Wrong Way Archival Bureau, 2021)
- Play Some Music (Sleeping Giant Glossolalia, 2026)

Compilation albums

- Green White Red (Magnetism Crafts / Wrong Way Archival Bureau, 2024)

Live albums

- Live on Pipeline, WMBR 03.16.04 (Neptune self-released, 2019)
- Live at SCSI Cell 11.20.2004 (Neptune self-released, 2021)
- Live at The Ugly House 12.18.94 (First Performance) (Neptune self-released, 1995 / mastered/reissued, 2024)

Mini-albums

- Mice and Worms (Magnetism Crafts / Self-Release Records, 2005)
- Cave Drawings (Self-Release Records / Magnetism Crafts, January 2011)

EPs

- Knife Fight E.P., 7-inch (Neptune self-released, 1996)
- Neptune., 3-song cassette (Neptune self-released, 1998)
- Basement Recordings E.P., 6-song CD (Mister Records, 2001)
- Green Cassette, 5-song C30 cassette (Magnetism Crafts, 2005)
- 3" CDR, 5-song CD-R (Magnetism Crafts, 2005)
- White Cassette, 4-song C20 cassette (Wrong Way Archival Bureau, 2005)
- 3" Collage CDR, 2 songs (Magnetism Crafts / Self-Release Records, 2006)
- Red Cassette, 6 improvisations, C30 cassette (Magnetism Crafts, 2006)
- 3" CDR, 3-song 3" CD-R (Hiddenbirdhouse, 2006)
- Tell My People to Go Home, 4-song EP, split release w/ One Second Riot, LP only (Distile Records, 2007)
- Paris Green, 5-track CD-R (Magnetism Crafts / Wrong Way Archival Bureau, 2007)
- Roman Business, 4 songs, C20 cassette (NOFI [Italy], March 2009)

Singles

- "Swang!/Poodle Walk", 7-inch single (Anti-Social Records, 1996)
- "Your Company/Productivity Is a Science", 7-inch single (Heliotrope Records, 2000)
- "At the Pink Pony/A Car Is a Weapon", Live 7-inch single (Mister Records, 2002)
- "#39 | #40", Lathe 7-inch single (Wrong Way Archival Bureau, 2024)

== Videos ==
- Equestrian Phantasy. Video by Zea Barker, 2006. (from Patterns)
- Silver Pool. Video by Mike Piso, 2008. (from Gong Lake)
- Grey Shallows. Video by Zea Barker, 2008. (from Gong Lake)
- Copper Green. Video by Jonathan Schwartz, 2008. (from Gong Lake)
- Blue Glass. Video by JB Sapienza, 2008. (from Gong Lake)
- Gentleman Caller. Video by Zea Barker, 2021. (from Mother of Millions)

== Live Videos ==
- Thorns. Video by Bill T Miller, recorded at the Paradise, Boston, MA, 8/3/2006. (from Neptune)
- The Penetrating Gaze. Video by Bill T Miller, recorded at the Middle East, Cambridge, MA, 12/29/2005. (from Patterns)
- Live in Strasbourg France (full set, 11 songs). Recorded live at Le Zanzibar, Strasbourg, France, 9/27/06. Video by Normaltv.org.
