= Wume =

- Origin: Baltimore, Maryland, USA
- Genres: Electronic rock, Experimental rock, Post-punk, Post-rock, krautrock, Progressive rock
- Years active: 2009-present
- Label: Northern Spy Records
- Members: April Camlin, Albert Schatz
- Website: wume.bandcamp.com

Wume is a polyrhythmic rock duo consisting of April Camlin (drums, vocals) and Albert Schatz (synthesizers, electronics). The band formed in Chicago in 2009, and is currently based in Baltimore, Maryland.

The name Wume derives from the band's fondness for Krautrock pioneers Faust, who formed in the town of Wümme. In addition to Krautrock, the band cites influences such as Francis Bebey, Erkin Koray, and Alice Coltrane, writing their songs around challenging polyrhythms "in search of purpose and personal liberation." Wume has toured with fellow Baltimore acts such as Beach House, Future Islands, Dan Deacon, and Lower Dens.

Wume released their studio album Towards the Shadow on Northern Spy Records in November 2018. In reviewing the record for Pitchfork, Jonathan Williger wrote, "Perhaps not since Fugazi or Stereolab has a band addressed the failings of capitalism and its effects on the human psyche in such direct terms," offering comparisons to the music of Steve Reich and Can, and noting that "the majority of the songs are written in odd time signatures, but the effect is largely thrilling rather than obtuse."

== Discography ==
=== Albums ===
- Maintain, Ehse Records, 2015
- Towards the Shadow, Northern Spy Records, 2018
