= Northern Spy Records =

- Founded: 2010
- Founder: Tom Abbs; Adam Downey
- Distributor: Redeye Distribution
- Genre: Avant-garde, noise rock, experimental jazz
- Country of origin: U.S.
- Location: Brooklyn, New York
- Official website: northernspyrecs.com

Northern Spy Records is a record label in Brooklyn, New York that specializes in avant-garde music, noise rock, and experimental jazz. The label was founded by Tom Abbs and Adam Downey in 2010 after working for ESP-Disk.

== History ==
Northern Spy is an artist-run record label. In October 2011, Northern Spy produced the first annual Spy Music Festival, spanning two days and hosted by two venues. The festival was hailed as a celebration of the label's first birthday. A year later, the label threw its second festival, which took place over two weeks in venues throughout Brooklyn and Manhattan. NSPY artists continue to support local venues by bringing their devoted fans together in small DIY venues.

Northern Spy and its management has been featured in the press through interviews, blogs and in newspapers. The Village Voice published an extensive interview with Downey and Abbs in September 2011. In July 2011, East Village Radio named Northern Spy one of the four most important independent record labels in New York City.

Northern Spy also owns the NNA Tapes record label. It is closely affiliated with the Clandestine Label Services management firm and with the Birdwatcher record label and recording studio firm.

== Artists ==
- Aa (Big A Little a)
- Angels in America
- Arnold Dreyblatt & Megafaun
- Arto Lindsay
- Bird Names
- Charles Gayle
- Chicago Underground Duo
- Chris Forsyth
- Cloud Becomes Your Hand
- Colin L. Orchestra
- Colin Langenus
- Cuddle Magic
- Dan Melchior
- Diamond Terrifier
- Donovan Quinn
- Eleven Twenty-Nine
- Eugene Chadbourne
- Extra Life
- Foot Village
- Gary Lucas
- Gerald Cleaver's Black Host
- Haunted House
- Horse Lords
- Hubble
- Jenks Miller
- John Butcher
- Loren Connors and Suzanne Langille
- Marc Ribot's Ceramic Dog
- Mystical Weapons
- Neptune
- NYMPH
- PC Worship
- Renata Zeiguer
- Rhys Chatham
- Seaven Teares
- Shilpa Ray
- Starring
- SUSS
- The Home of Easy Credit
- The Necks
- The Spanish Donkey
- The USA Is a Monster
- Thurston Moore & Loren Connors
- Wume
- Zs

== Discography ==
Incomplete list of releases
Yr	Cat	Release title	Artist(s)	Notes
2010	NS-001	R.I.P	USAISAMONSTER	LP, CD
2010	NS-002	Songbook Vol. 1	Old Time Relijun	7"
2010	NS-003	The Warrior	Jooklo Duo	7"
2011	NS-004	Outdoor Spell	Rhys Chatham	CD
2012	NS-019	Honky Tonk Medusa	Donovan Quinn	LP
2012	NS-020	Age of Energy	Chicago Underground Duo	CD, LP
2013	NS-034	Power Ballads	Seaven Teares	LP
2013	NS-036	The Only Way to Go Is Straight Through	Thurston Moore & Loren Connors	CD, LP
2013	NS-038	Your Turn	Marc Ribot's Ceramic Dog	CD, LP
2013	NS-039	Life in the Sugar Candle Mines	Black Host	CD
2014	NS-052	Locus	Chicago Underground Duo	CD, LP
2014	NS-053	Who Sleeps, Only Dreams/Hide With Me	Deerhoof w/guest Marc Ribot	7", Ltd
2014	NS-054	Live at Le Poisson Rouge	J. Spaceman & Kid Millions	LP + 7"
2015	NS-066	Accidental Sky	White Out with Nels Cline	CD
2018	NS-106	Towards the Shadow	Wume	LP, digital

== See also ==
- List of independent record labels
