= Gladys Bentley =

American blues singer (1907–1960)

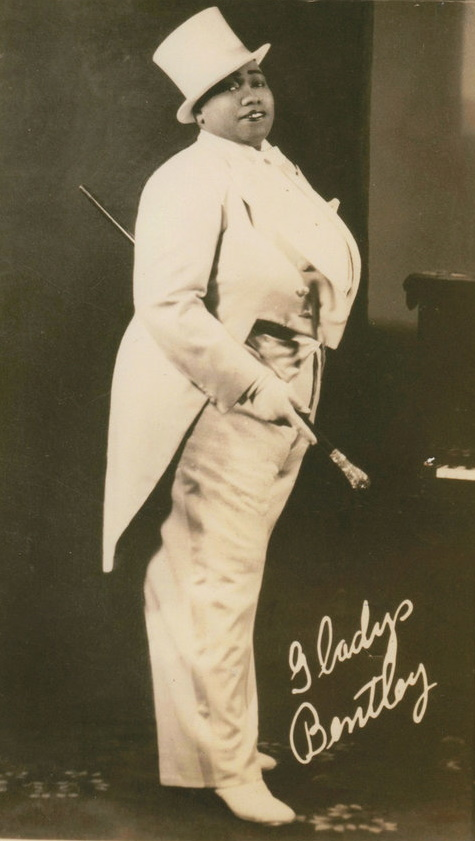
- Bentley c. 1930

Background information
- Also known as: Barbara "Bobbie" Minton
- Born: Gladys Alberta Bentley; August 12, 1907; Philadelphia, Pennsylvania, U.S.
- Died: January 18, 1960 (aged 52) Los Angeles, California, U.S.
- Genres: Blues, jazz
- Occupation: Singer, songwriter, entertainer
- Years active: 1920s–1950s

Gladys Alberta Bentley (August 12, 1907 – January 18, 1960) was an American blues singer, pianist, and entertainer who became a prominent figure during the Harlem Renaissance. She was widely recognized for having a strong contralto voice, spirited stage presence, and a riveting performance style. She is remembered for breaking barriers in jazz, blues, and gender roles.

Bentley got her start after being signed to Okeh Records and eventually her name became synonymous with Harry Hansberry's Clam House, a well-known gay speakeasy in New York City in the 1920s. She headlined in Harlem's Ubangi Club as a black lesbian and cross-dressing performer, often being backed by drag queens in her performances. Bentley was typically dressed in men's clothes which included a signature tail coat and top hat and was known to be a spirited piano player and for singing risqué renditions to popular songs of the time in her deep and powerful voice.

With the repeal of Prohibition in 1933, she eventually relocated to southern California in the late 1930s where she was billed "America's Greatest Sepia Piano Player" and the "Brown Bomber of Sophisticated Songs". Bentley continued to perform, tour, and record music well into the 1950s.

== Personal life and sexuality ==
=== Early life ===
Bentley was born on August 12, 1907, in Philadelphia, Pennsylvania to George L. Bentley and Mary Mote. She was raised in a working-class family that struggled financially. The eldest of four, she began showing interest in music and performance from a young age, eventually developing talents in singing and piano. In an article Bentley wrote for Ebony magazine in 1952, there was trouble in the home as she was growing up and a strained relationship between her and her mother. She stated that she always felt unwanted or rejected because her mother desperately wanted her to have been born a boy and further said that her grandmother raised her for 6 months as an infant on a bottle. In her childhood, she often wore the suits of her three younger brothers to school and had a crush on one of her female teachers in elementary school. Bentley was taken to various doctors by her parents in an attempt to "cure" her. She believed that growing up feeling rejected further shaped her behavior. She ran away at the age of 16 to Harlem, New York where she would begin her career in music and entertainment.

=== Sexuality ===
In her Ebony article "I Am a Woman Again", Bentley stated that "It seems I was born different. At least, I always thought so." From an early age, Bentley defied gender normative behaviors and femininity. Preferring to wear her brothers' suits instead of dresses or blouses, she did not match the early-twentieth century's beauty ideals of traditional femininity. Bentley recalled dreaming and being infatuated with her primary school female teachers but did not understand those feelings until later on in her life. Bentley's behavior was seen as abnormal and "unladylike" which led to her family sending her to doctors to "fix" her desires. Later, psychiatrists would coin Bentley's non-heteronormative behavior as "extreme social maladjustment."

In her live performances, Bentley frequently called out men and openly sang sexually suggestive lyrics which was seen as highly risqué behavior at the time, especially for a woman. She often sang about "sissies" and "bulldaggers" in her performances through innuendo or though rousing dances and was known to flirt with women in the audience. Bentley challenged traditional gender roles by performing suggestive songs, openly expressing attraction to women, and wearing masculine clothing. In 1930, Bentley lived with a woman named Beatrice Robert. In 1931, Bentley had a civil ceremony in New Jersey, in a public union with a white woman whose identity is not confirmed.

In her later years, Bentley conformed to more traditional gender roles, arguably due to the rising social conservatism and pressure at the time. When Bentley relocated to Los Angeles, she reportedly married J. T. Gibson, who died in 1952, the same year in which she married Charles Roberts, a cook in Los Angeles. They were married in Santa Barbara, California, went on a honeymoon in Mexico. Gibson denied ever marrying her. Bentley claimed to have been "cured" by taking female hormones later in life. Bentley wrote her 1952 essay, "I Am a Woman Again", for Ebony magazine in which she stated she had undergone an operation which "helped change her life again". She later became a devout member of The Temple of Love in Christ, Inc., to be ordained as a minister before her death in 1960.

== Career ==
=== Harlem ===
She moved from Philadelphia to Harlem, a neighborhood in New York City in 1925 at the age of 16. Bentley began performing at rent parties and started establishing her reputation as a performer. She heard that Harry Hansberry's Clam House on 133rd Street, one of the city's most notorious gay speakeasies, needed a male pianist. This is when she began performing in men's attire ("white full dress shirts, stiff collars, small bow ties, oxfords, short Eton jackets, and hair cut straight back"), and here she perfected her act and was quickly launched into stardom as one of the first and most famous openly lesbian performers of her time.

Her salary started at $35 per week plus tips and went to $125 per week, and the club was soon renamed Barbara's Exclusive Club, after her stage name at the time, Barbara "Bobbie" Minton. She then began performing at the Ubangi Club on Park Avenue, got an accompanist on piano, and was successful enough to own a "$300/month apartment in Park Ave. With servants and a nice car" (although some have said that she was living in the penthouse of one of her lesbian lovers). She toured the country, some destinations being Cleveland, Pittsburgh, Chicago, and Hollywood, where she was well liked by Cesar Romero, Hugh Herbert, Cary Grant, Barbara Stanwyck, and other celebrities.

Bentley had great talent as a piano player, singer, and entertainer. Her performances (in the words of Alfred Duckett) were "comical, sweet and risqué" for the era and the audience. In her music, she called out men and openly sang about sexual relationships which was seen as risqué behavior at the time. Even more, she often sang about "sissies" and "bulldaggers" and, through innuendo or more literally, about her female lovers, and she flirted with women in the audience. She claimed that she had married a white woman in Atlantic City, and it was widely publicised in the press although the woman remains unnamed.

She mostly played the blues and parodies of popular songs of the time. As James Wilson writes, "mocking 'high' class imagery with 'low' class humor, she applied aspects of the sexually charged 'black' blues to demure, romantic 'white' ballads, creating a culture clash between these two music forms". Bentley was known for taking popular songs and putting a promiscuous spin on them. She sang loud, and her vocal style was deep and booming, sometimes using a growling effect and imitations of a horn. In August 1928, she signed with Okeh Records company and recorded eight sides over the course of the next year up until 1929. In 1930 she recorded a side with the Washboard Serenaders for Victor, and later recorded for the Excelsior, and Flame labels. Her vocal range was wide, as can be heard in her recordings. She mostly sang in a deep, low range, but also reached high notes. Bentley's performances appealed to black, white, gay, and straight audiences alike, and many celebrities attended her shows. Langston Hughes recorded his reaction to the beginning of Bentley's career success:

For two or three amazing years, Miss Bentley sat, and played piano all night long … with scarcely a break between the notes, sliding from one song to another, with a powerful and continuous underbeat of jungle rhythm. Miss Bentley was an amazing exhibition of musical energy – a large, dark, masculine lady, whose feet pounded the floor while her fingers pounded the keyboard – a perfect piece of African sculpture, animated by her own rhythm.

==== Legal battle ====
Bentley was involved in a legal dispute overseen by the Manhattan Supreme Court in 1933. The owners Harry Hansberry and Nat Palein of Hansberry's Clam House claimed that Bentley allegedly violated a five-year performance contract with the venue and thus should be barred from performing elsewhere in Harlem. Hansberry and Palein were prompted to take legal action after Bentley allegedly left the club to perform at other venues. This was in efforts to prohibit Bentley from taking her musical career to the Broadway division as her performances were central to the success of the club. She allegedly agreed to perform exclusively for the Clam House around 10pm every night.

The same year, she attempted to move her act to Broadway, despite legal issues. There she received many complaints about her raunchy performances which resulted in the police locking up the doors of places she performed. Unable to express her talent on Broadway, moved back to Harlem in 1934, where she then played at the Ubangi Club for three years before it closed in 1937.

=== California ===
On the decline of the Harlem speakeasies with the repeal of Prohibition, she relocated to southern California to live with her mother in Los Angeles, California, where she was billed as "America's Greatest Sepia Piano Player" and the "Brown Bomber of Sophisticated Songs". In the 1940 and 50's she headlined at various clubs including Rose Room in Hollywood, Joaquin's El Rancho in Los Angeles, and Mona's 440 Club, the first lesbian bar to open in San Francisco, California in 1936.

As times progressed and federal laws continued to change surrounding the Red and Lavender scares of the 1940s and 1950s, Bentley eventually had to carry special permits to allow her to perform in her signature suit and top hat. Bentley was openly lesbian early in her career, but during the McCarthy Era, she began wearing dresses in her performances and married Charles Roberts, 28 year-old cook, in a civil ceremony in Santa Barbara, California, in 1952.

Bentley became a devotee of the Temple of Love in Christ, Inc. and was preparing to become an ordained minister, claiming to have been "cured" by taking female hormones. In an effort to describe her supposed "cure" for homosexuality she wrote an essay, "I Am a Woman Again", for Ebony magazine in 1952 stating she had had undergone an operation, which helped her find "redemption from [her] sins". In her essay, Bentley states that some wear their non-conformity aloud like badges of honor and in a contrasting statement:

"Others, seeking to avoid the censure of society, hide behind respectable fronts, haunted always by the fear of exposure and ostracism. Society shuns us. The unscrupulous exploit us. Very few people can understand us. In fact, a great number of us do not understand ourselves."

On May 15, 1958, she appeared as a contestant on You Bet Your Life, engaging in discussion with host Groucho Marx before accompanying herself on piano as she sang "Them There Eyes". She wore a dress and pearls, contrasting with her earlier Harlem image on her last and only televised performance.

== Legacy and death ==
Bentley died of pneumonia unexpectedly at her home in Los Angeles on January 18, 1960, aged 52. It was initially believed to be the "Asian flu" but later recognized as pneumonia. At the time of her death, she had been more involved in The Temple of Love in Christ, Inc. and had just been ordained as a minister despite never getting her official paperwork. She is buried beside her mother at Lincoln Memorial Park in Carson, California.

Aside from her musical talent and success, Bentley is a significant and inspiring figure for many in the LGBTQ community and for African Americans. She was a prominent figure during the Harlem Renaissance, although not as widely recognized as her counterparts in mainstream media, likely due to the nature and innuendo of her performances. She was revolutionary in her masculinity, as James Wilson explains: "Differing from the traditional male impersonator, or drag king, in the popular theater, Bentley did not try to 'pass' as a man, nor did she playfully try to deceive her audience into believing she was biologically male. Instead, she exerted a 'black female masculinity' that troubled the distinctions between black and white and masculine and feminine".

Fictional characters based on Bentley appear severally in literary works, cementing her as a blueprint for the masculine woman archetype in pop culture. Notable references to Gladys Bentley can be found in Carl Van Vechten's novel Parties, Clement Woods' novel Deep River, Blair Niles' novel Strange Brother, and in Langston Hughes play Little Ham where a character called Masculine Lady is said to look “exactly like Gladys Bentley”.

In 2016, musician Shirlette Ammons released an album entitled Twilight for Gladys Bentley, which paid tribute to Bentley's legacy and "reimagined" Bentley in relationship to hip hop culture. There is ongoing discourse about Bentley's true identity and if her apparent shift from homosexuality was purely in efforts to maintain favor in the public eye amid the cultural shift post World War II.

In 2019, The New York Times newspaper began a series called "Overlooked No More," in which the editorial staff aims to correct a perceived bias in reporting by republishing obituaries of historical minorities and women. Bentley was one of the featured obituaries in Overlooked No More.

== Venues ==
Bentley appeared at:

- The Mad House, 133rd Street, Harlem, New York City, New York
- Harry Hansberry's Clam House ("Gladys' Clam House"), 133rd Street, Harlem, Harlem, New York City, New York
- Ubangi Club, Harlem, New York City, New York
- Connie's Inn ("Jungle Alley"), 2221 Seventh Street, Harlem, New York City, New York
- Apollo Theatre, Harlem, New York City, New York
- The Cotton Club, Harlem, New York City, New York
- Joaquin's El Rancho, Los Angeles, California
- Mona's 440 Club, North Beach, San Francisco, California
- Doll House, 12213 Ventura Blvd, Los Angeles, California

== Discography ==
Okeh Records

Recorded August 8 and 31, 1928

- "Worried Blues" / "Ground Hog Blues" (August 1928) #8610
- "How Long, How Long Blues" / "Moanful Wailin' Blues" (August 1928) #8612

Recorded November 15, 1928, and March 26, 1929

- "Wild Geese Blues" / "How Much Can I Stand" (November 1928, with piano, not released)
- "Wild Geese Blues" / "How Much Can I Stand" (November 1928, with guitar) #8643
- "Red Beans and Rice" / "Big Gorilla Man" (March 1929) #8707

Victor

- "Washboards Get Together" / "Kazoo Moan", #38127, scatting vocal on A-side only (title often listed as "Washboard Get Together"), with the Washboard Serenaders, recorded March 1930; reissued twice, as Bluebird B-5790 (circa 1934) and B-6633 (circa 1936)

Excelsior Records

As Gladys Bentley Quintette, 1945

- "Boogie'n My Woogie" / "Thrill Me Till I Get My Fill", #164
- "Red Beans & Rice Blues" / "Find Out What He Likes (and How He Likes It)" #165/166
- "Big Gorilla Blues" / "Lay It on the Line", #166/165
- "Boogie Woogie Cue" / "Give It Up", #168
- "Notoriety Papa" / "It Went to the Girl Next Door", #169

Swingtime Records

- "Jingle Jangle Jump", #321, vocals for Wardell Gray and the Dexter Gordon Quintet, 1952
- "Fourth of July Boogie" / "June-Teenth Jamboree", #337, as Fatso Bentley, July 4, 1953

Flame Records

- "Easter Mardi Gras" / "Before Midnight", Flame 1001, Cincinnati, early 1950s, label misspells name as Gladys Bently; mentioned in her August 1952 article in Ebony and thus recorded in 1952 or earlier

== See also ==
- Florence Hines
