= Gong Lake (album) =

2008 album by Neptune

Studio album by Neptune
- Released: February 19, 2008
- Recorded: 2007
- Studio: Machines With Magnets, Pawtucket, Rhode Island
- Genre: Noise rock; experimental; industrial
- Length: 39:05
- Label: Table of the Elements, Radium
- Producer: Kevin Micka / Neptune

Professional ratings
Review scores
Source	Rating
Pitchfork Media	(7.0/10)
Sputnikmusic	(4.5/5)

Gong Lake is the sixth full-length album by American noise rock band Neptune, released on February 19, 2008, by Table of the Elements / Radium. It was the band's first release to be distributed worldwide.

== Reception ==
Pitchfork writer Jason Crock wrote, who "knows what machine has been subverted to make the noise, many songs start from stretched, ominous tones that may as well be from keyboards, notably on songs like "Copper Green" where the band hangs several little noise fugues like tree ornaments on one central, icy one-note drone." A review on XlR8R described the album as "hardcore and aggressively agitating, this arrangement of instrumentation is hard on the ears yet clever enough to keep you interested." Sputnik Music giving the album a 4.5/5 rating, stated "Gong Lake is a steady manifestation towards what music can be: a musical thrill that is as innovative with the physical craft of the music as is the aural experimentation itself. The industrial soundscapes are as industrial as the makeshift instruments, or the sharp angles the creations make."

== Packaging ==
Gong Lake was issued worldwide on CD and LP via American avant-garde record label Table of the Elements. The vinyl version was pressed on clear "coke bottle" hued vinyl.

== Track listing ==
All tracks are written by Neptune.

No.	Title	Length
1.	"Silver Pool"	1:32
2.	"Gray Shallows"	4:24
3.	"Paris Green"	3:49
4.	"Purple Sleep"	4:14
5.	"Yellow River"	4:17
6.	"Copper Green"	2:38
7.	"Blue Glass"	3:08
8.	"Black Tide"	4:22
9.	"Red Sea"	5:36
10.	"Ebbing"	0:50

== Personnel ==
Neptune

- Jason Sidney Sanford – foot-controlled synthesizer, bass lamellophone, spring harp, baritone guitar, drum effects, vocals
- Mark William Pearson – amplified floor tom, percussion, lightswitch synthesizer, baritone guitar, drum effects, vocals
- Daniel Paul Boucher - drums, steel pipe xylophone, toggleswitch oscillator, amplified floor tom, drum effects, vocals

Additional musicians

- Kenneth Wagner Linehan – homemade synthesizer (Copper Green, Ebbing)
- Kevin Emil Micka – electric spring, drum effects (Silver Pool)

Production

- Kevin Emil Micka - recording, mixing engineer
- Neptune - mixing, production
- Keith Elton Souza - assistant engineer
- Seth James Manchester - assistant engineer
- Scott Turner Craggs – mastering engineer
- Jeff Hunt – executive producer

Packaging & Design

- Lindsay Metivier - photography
- Neptune - photography, layout
