= Intimate Lightning =

Studio album by Neptune
- Released: March 20, 2004
- Recorded: 2003
- Studio: BC, Gowanus, Brooklyn, New York City
- Genre: Noise rock; experimental; no wave; post-punk
- Length: 36:59
- Label: Mr. Records (CD) / 100% Breakfast (LP)
- Producer: Martin Bisi; Neptune

Intimate Lightning is the third full-length album by American noise rock band Neptune, released on March 20, 2004, by Mr. Records (CD) / 100% Breakfast Records (LP).

== Reception ==
Professional ratings
Review scores
| Source | Rating |
|---|---|
| Pitchfork | 7.9/10 |

Pitchfork writer Joe Tangari described the album's songs as "tightly wound nailbombs of rapidly shifting meters, clanging rhythms, and mathtacular start/stop passages designed for maximum sensory damage. Sanford's vocals are secondary, it seems, to the grotesque clatter surrounding them – he whispers and growls squarely in the middle of the mix, perfectly content to let the pummeling grooves overwhelm his Dadaist lyrics." In Chicago-based independent music magazine Punk Planet's 62nd issue, reviewer Rex Reason stated while attempting to review Intimate Lightning: "The use of certain comparisons is warned against when reviewing records. At the top of the list are "if Band A and Band B had a baby..." and "if Band A and Band B were in a blender..." This record sounds like a swarm of insects making a baby with a band in a blender."

== Packaging ==
Intimate Lightning was issued on CD by Boston, MA independent label Mr. Records. The LP version was released by Cambridge, MA independent record label 100% Breakfast Records and was pressed on white vinyl. Due to several production errors at the pressing plant, only 141 copies of the Intimate Lightning LP were released.

On the vinyl version, side A ends in a locked groove with the culmination of the track "At the Pink Pony". On the CD version, "At the Pink Pony" slowly cross-fades into the next track "Automatic".

== Track listing ==
All tracks are written by Neptune, except where noted.

Intimate Lightning track listing
| No. | Title | Length |
|---|---|---|
| 1. | "Tiny Conductor" | 3:36 |
| 2. | "Misty" | 3:08 |
| 3. | "Silver Planets" | 3:40 |
| 4. | "A Little Spider" | 4:20 |
| 5. | "At the Pink Pony" | 3:39 |
| 6. | "Automatic" (written by Jane Wiedlin, originally performed by the Go Go's) | 2:38 |
| 7. | "In This Hemisphere" | 5:05 |
| 8. | "A Car Is a Weapon" | 2:22 |
| 9. | "Jeremy Bentham" | 2:27 |
| 10. | "The Gilded Bomb" | 5:47 |

== Personnel ==
Neptune

- Jason Sidney Sanford – guitar, vocals
- Mark William Pearson – bass, vocals
- John Douglas Manson – drums, vocals
- Daniel Paul Boucher – percussion, violin, backing vocals

Production

- Martin Bisi – recording, mixing engineer
- Neptune – mixing, production
- John Jacobson – mastering (Sound Station Seven, Providence, Rhode Island)

Packaging and design

- James Quigley – illustration, layout
