= Macroscope (album) =

Studio album by The Nels Cline Singers
- Released: April 29, 2014
- Recorded: January 2014
- Genres: Rock, jazz
- Length: 58:29
- Labels: Mack Avenue; MAC1085
- Producers: Nels Cline, David Breskin

The Nels Cline Singers chronology
Initiate (2010)	Macroscope (2014)

Nels Cline chronology
Room (2014)	Macroscope (2014)	Accidental Sky (2015)

Macroscope is the fifth album by The Nels Cline Singers led by American guitarist Nels Cline which was released on April 29, 2014, on the Mack Avenue label.

== Reception ==
Professional ratings
Review scores
Source	Rating
AllMusic	4/5 stars
The Guardian	3/5 stars
All About Jazz	4.5/5 stars
Premier Guitar	4/5 stars

The AllMusic review by Sean Westergaard awarded the album 4 stars out of 5, stating "while the Nels Cline Singers may have a new bass player and a new label, fortunately their sound has not changed. They're still making some of the most interesting, adventurous, genre-smashing music of the early 21st century. Guitar nerds need to check this out, but it's got wider appeal than that too". The Guardian's John Fordham rated the album 3 stars out of 5, saying, "Macroscope is a blast through warped Latin music, Hendrix freakouts, double-taking George Bensonian smoothness, electronica and grunge". Writing for All About Jazz, Matt Marshall stated "Since this is a Nels Cline album there are, of course, guitar solos of blistering beauty. But these moments are but part of an organic progression of an ever- roiling music, a highly reactive science experiment that might generate searing fuzz guitar from undulating beats ("Red Before Orange") or rise in a back-spinning psychedelic echo ("The Wedding Band") that replicates into an annihilating vortex of amplified noise". Premier Guitar's Jason Shadrick noted "This isn’t easy music to get into—and it’s not supposed to be. Cline’s musical trick bag is always surprising, but never excessive". Paste Magazine's Robert Ham called it "one of the best jazz releases of the year to date".

== Track listing ==
All compositions by Nels Cline.

1. "Companion Piece" - 5:37
2. "Canales' Cabeza" - 4:23
3. "Respira" - 4:19
4. "Red Before Orange" - 4:11
5. "The Wedding Band" - 8:18
6. "Macroscopic (For Kusama-San)" - 4:01
7. "Climb Down" - 3:20
8. "Seven Zed Heaven" - 11:16
9. "Hairy Mother" - 7:10
10. "Sascha's Book of Frogs" - 5:54

== Personnel ==
The Nels Cline Singers

- Nels Cline – guitar, vocals, effects, drum programming
- Trevor Dunn – bass, effects
- Scott Amendola – drums, percussion, electronics, mbira

Additional musicians

- Cyro Baptista – percussion
- Yuka Honda – electric piano, synthesizer
- Josh Jones – congas, percussion
- Zeena Parkins – harp
