= Accidental Sky =

Studio album by White Out with Nels Cline
- Released: October 16, 2015
- Recorded: 2015
- Genre: Improvised music
- Length: 35:45
- Label: Northern Spy

Nels Cline chronology
Macroscope (2015)	Accidental Sky (2015)	Lovers (2016)

White Out chronology
Asphalt and Delay (2011)	Accidental Sky (2015)

Accidental Sky is an album by experimental music group White Out with guitarist Nels Cline which was released in October 2015 on the Northern Spy label.

== Reception ==
Professional ratings
Review scores
Source	Rating
Pitchfork	6.9/10

Pitchfork's Raymond Cummings rated the album 6.9 out of 10, saying, "What's most frustrating isn't ultimately that Sky doesn't make it beyond the stratosphere, but that some of these songs should go on longer; they need more space to stretch, breathe, expand into stranger, deeper realms." Relix correspondent Jesse Jarnow noted: "keyboardist Lin Culbertson and drummer Tom Surgal provide a lush and constantly shifting bed for Cline’s sweet Tom Verlaine/Duane Allman-y volume swells. On the album's best pieces, the trio achieves three-dimensionality, percussion and keyboards and guitar melting in and out of one another to form abstruse landscapes with dancing horizons."

== Track listing ==
All compositions by Nels Cline, Lin Culbertson and Tom Surgal.

1. "Imperative" – 6:07
2. "Ragged Mist of Stalled Horizon" – 6:46
3. "Sirius Missing" – 4:52
4. "Winter Light" – 3:16
5. "Exaltation by Proxy" – 6:37
6. "Under a Void Moon" – 5:41
7. "Soft, Nameless, Absolute" – 4:32

== Personnel ==
- Nels Cline – guitar
- Lin Culbertson – analog synthesizer, autoharp, voice
- Tom Surgal – drums, etc.
