= Initiate (Nels Cline Singers album) =

2010 album by The Nels Cline Singers

Studio album / Live album by The Nels Cline Singers
- Released: April 13, 2010
- Recorded: March 22–23, 2009 and September 3, 2009
- Venues: Cafe du Nord, San Francisco, CA
- Studios: Fantasy Studios, Berkeley, CA
- Genres: Rock, jazz
- Length: 155:10
- Labels: Cryptogramophone; CG143
- Producers: Nels Cline, David Breskin

The Nels Cline Singers chronology
The Celestial Septet (2008)	Initiate (2010)	Macroscope (2014)

Initiate is the fourth album by The Nels Cline Singers led by American guitarist Nels Cline which was released in April 2010 on the Cryptogramophone label.

== Reception ==
Professional ratings
Review scores
Source	Rating
AllMusic	4.5/5 stars
The Guardian	4/5 stars
All About Jazz	4/5 stars
Pitchfork	7.2

The AllMusic review by Sean Westergaard awarded the album 4½ stars out of 5, stating "Initiate is the most fully realized project Cline has devoted himself to yet, and extends the musical frontiers the Singers are capable of not only engaging, but conquering". The Guardian's John Fordham rated the album 4 stars out of 5, saying, "Don't be deceived by the name – this is really a scorched-earth metal-electronica improvising guitar band that threatens to blow you out of your window... It's pretty fierce, but a contemporary guitar buff's dreamworld". Writing for All About Jazz, Matt Marshall stated "With its combination of studio precision and live energy, Initiate presents the most complete picture available of The Nels Cline Singers". JazzTimes' Mike Shandley noted "The double-CD Initiate features one studio disc and one live disc, each revealing the trio’s alternating abilities to mow down listeners with brute force or gently sooth". Paste Magazine's Steve Dollar observed "If a different guitarist put out such a sonic crazyquilt, they’d probably be accused of lacking focus or spreading themselves too thin. With Cline, it’s like an MRI scan of a startling and original imagination, too crammed with juicy ideas to repeat any of them too frequently". Pitchfork's Joe Tangari stated "More than anything, Initiate shows a band whose sense of give and take and intuitive interplay is extremely well-developed. Cline is able to lead his compatriots just about anywhere his mind wants to wander, and they follow him easily, whether he's merging Frippertronics with jazz, out-krautrocking Wilco, or bringing in David Witham to play a crazy, 1960s-tinged organ solo. Cline may never reach a larger audience working under his own name, but that doesn't seem to be his goal. He's reached a place where he can do his mutant thing to his heart's content, and the results are exuberant, messy, and worth a couple of hours of your time".

== Track listing ==
All compositions by Nels Cline except where noted.

Disc one: studio

1. "Into It" - 2:51
2. "Floored" - 5:04
3. "Divining" - 7:37
4. "You Noticed" - 2:53
5. "Red Line to Greenland" (Nels Cline, Devin Hoff, Scott Amendola) - 8:57
6. "Mercy (Supplication)" - 2:25
7. "Grow Closer" - 6:45
8. "Scissor/Saw" (Cline, Hoff, Amendola) - 3:41
9. "B86 (Inkblot Nebula)" - 2:10
10. "King Queen" - 7:15
11. "Zingiber" - 3:51
12. "Mercy (Procession)" - 7:00
13. "Into It (You Turn)" - 2:55

Disc two: live

1. "Forge" - 8:20
2. "Fly Fly" - 11:25
3. "Raze" - 8:08
4. "And Now the Queen" (Carla Bley) - 5:35
5. "Blues, Too" - 7:13
6. "Thurston County" - 9:14
7. "Sunken Song" - 7:05
8. "Boogie Woogie Waltz" (Joe Zawinul) - 14:25

== Personnel ==
The Nels Cline Singers

- Nels Cline – acoustic guitar, electric guitar, effects, vocals
- Devra Hoff – contrabass, bass guitar
- Scott Amendola – drums, percussion, electronics, loops

Additional musicians

- David Witham– organ, electric piano
- Yuka Honda – synthesizer
- Greg Saunier, John Dieterich, Satomi Matsuzaki – percussion
