= White Out (band) =

American experimental music group

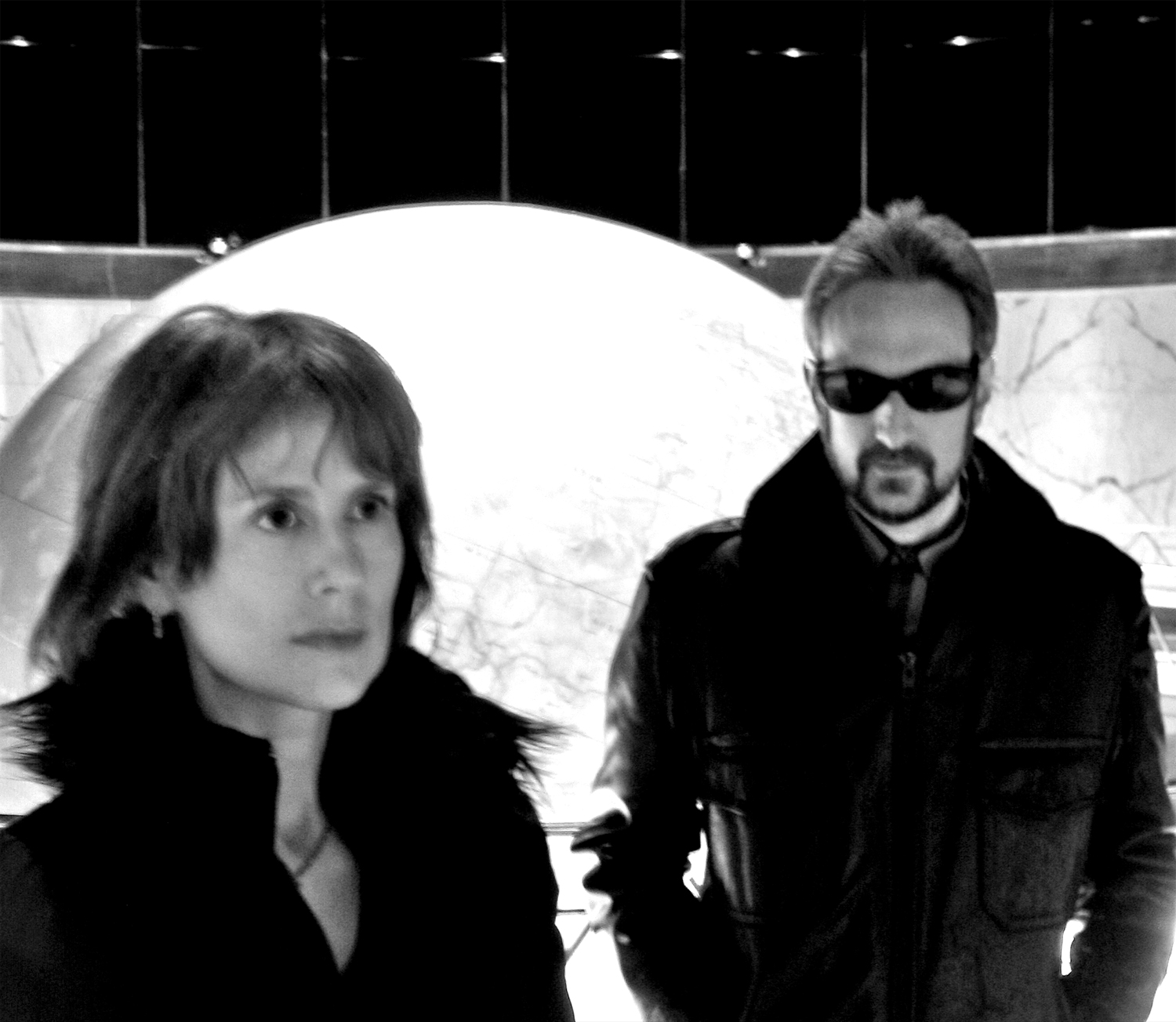

Background information
- Origin: New York, NY, USA
- Genres: Experimental
- Years active: 1995-present
- Labels: Ecstatic Peace, ATP Recordings
- Members: Tom Surgal; Lin Culbertson
- Website: Official Website

White Out is a two-piece experimental music group from New York City that formed in winter 1995, whose aim is to create "an incendiary new music". The bands core members are Tom Surgal and Lin Culbertson, but they often work with other musicians, most notably producer/musician/filmmaker Jim O'Rourke on two albums.

== Biography ==
Soon after they formed, the highly charged "freakout" style of the group's early live shows quickly established their reputation as ones to watch. Using a uniquely diverse arsenal of instruments (including analog synthesizers, autoharp, flute, drums, gongs, bells, chains, etc.), they attempted to develop a radically new and fluid sound, and to this end decided on an open-ended invitation to other like minded musicians to join them both live and on record.

The first of their albums, Red Shift, came out in 1998 on Sonic Youth frontman Thurston Moore's Ecstatic Peace! label. Moore has collaborated with the band in the live arena and been a long-time supporter. Shift was a collaboration with David Nuss, longtime member of experimental New York group No-Neck Blues Band. It was described as "son-of-a-Bitches Brew" in a complimentary review in Alternative Press.

Their second album, Drunken Little Mass, came out in 2000 (on the same label), and featured another collaborator in the shape of Grammy Award-winning rock musician Jim O'Rourke. This time their work was described by XLR8R as "an improvised intergalactic escapade into the nether regions of the universe... a universe of chaos, tension and beauty."

2005 saw a move to London-based ATP Recordings for a third full-length release, China Is Near, their most acclaimed set to date. O'Rourke returned for this release, and was joined by virtuoso percussionist and frequent John Zorn collaborator William Winant. One review stated, "China speaks in an alien tongue that nonetheless conveys wonder and horror in equal measure... any discussion of truly adventurous music today must include White Out", and another "Noise as a genre is a bit too reductive and Improv too paradoxically pedantic to describe what's truly going on here, but aficionados of either of those scenes will find more than enough to love." Pitchfork Media gave it a 7.5 rating and noted the "astonishing variety of percussive textures" whilst also praising the album's "molten, form-shifting splendor."

Other comrades in instrumental arms over the years have included ex-Minuteman Mike Watt, acclaimed multi-instrumentalist and current Wilco member Nels Cline, and DJ Olive. White Out has performed at the All Tomorrow's Parties (in America in 2002 and the UK in 2007), CMJ and SKIF II festivals. They were also guests of the Pittsburgh New Music Ensemble and have gigged from coast to coast and in Europe.

2008 performances have included a March performance at The Stone in their home town of New York (a venue whose musical director is currently John Zorn, with collaborator Thurston Moore and one at No Fun Fest (also in New York) in May with Carlos Giffoni and C. Spencer Yeh.

== Discography ==
=== Albums ===
- Red Shift (with David Nuss of NNCK) (Ecstatic Peace, 1998)
- Drunken Little Mass (with Jim O'Rourke) (Ecstatic Peace, 2000)
- China Is Near (with Jim O'Rourke and William Winant) (ATP Recordings, 2005)
- Senso (with Jim O'Rourke and Thurston Moore) (Ecstatic Peace, 2009)
- Asphalt and Delay (audioMER, 2011) [Limited edition LP]
- Accidental Sky (with Nels Cline) (Northern Spy, 2015)
