= Jessica Rylan =

American musician (born 1974)

Jessica Rylan (born 1974) is a sound artist, electronic musician, and engineer originally from Boston, Massachusetts. Most of Rylan's work is based on the design and construction of DIY modular synthesizers, which she then uses to create a variety of sounds combined with her own vocal performance. Her work has been described as "a set of weird hybrids - noise pop, folk noise", and "sometimes rough, sometimes playful, sometimes confessional". She describes herself as an "artist turned engineer", and has cited Merzbow as an influence upon her own work.

== Early life and education ==
Rylan grew up in Boston, Massachusetts and was based in Boston for the beginning of her career. She has played music for most of her life and began with classical training. Rylan also sang, read music, and played musical instruments in her early years. Her grandfather was an electrical engineer and was her first influence in the area of electronics. He taught her about electronics and helped her first build machines. The magazine Popular Electronics was also an inspiration to Rylan when she was growing up.

Rylan received an MFA degree in electronic music from Bard College in 2003. She was a research affiliate at the MIT Center For Advanced Visual Studies from 2006 to 2010. Rylan received a BS degree in electrical engineering from University of Massachusetts Lowell in 2010. She has received grants from Penny McCall Foundation and the LEF Foundation and is currently a PhD candidate in electrical engineering at Stanford University.

== Career ==
Rylan is a solo artist, working as the noise band Can't, or under her own name. She has performed across the United States and toured in Europe, Russia, and Norway. Rylan's work has been released as a limited series on her own IRFP label, as well as recordings on Important Records (USA), Musica Excentrica (Russia), and Drop Of Blood Records (Netherlands), among others.

On 14 November 2007, Rylan gave an artist's talk at the MIT Center For Advanced Visual Studies, discussing the development of her work, her influences and her work with Don Buchla.

Rylan is one of the artists featured in Totally Wired, a documentary about Andreas Schneider's infamous boutique electronic musical instrument shop called SchneidersBuero, in Berlin.

In January 2012, Rylan performed as part of Stanford University's KZSU 90.1FM's 24-hour "Day Of Noise" experimental music broadcast.

Rylan has performed with various artists, including John Wiese, Thurston Moore, and Wolf Eyes.

Year	Event
2002	A sound installation Thesis at Baird College Research at Berwick Research Institute
2003	Touring
2003	Writing for a magazine
2003	Receiving a grant for a research project with LEF Foundation
2003	Boom Box show at the Boston Center for Arts
2003	TV performance with Greater Boston Arts, WGBH TV
2004	Project:AIR at Smith College
2004	sound installation at MIT’s List Gallery for Visual Arts
2004	RRRecords final performance of Can’t songs
2005	Sound installation Mills Gallery, Boston
2005	Book- bri:air vol 1 (research book)

== Business ==
Rylan started a business, Flower Electronics, in 2006 where she produces editions of her instruments for purchase. These include: Little Boy Blue, Personal Synth, Natural Synth, Battery Powered Noise Generator, Modular Synthesizer, Controller, White Face, Blue Box, Arvin Radio, Bogen Intercom, Intermodulator #1.

Rylan discusses the process behind (and details the schematics for) her DIY Personal Synthesizer (2004) build in an article for the Vague Terrain journal.
