= Advaeta =

American alt-rock band

- Origin: Brooklyn, New York, United States
- Genres: Alt-rock; Shoegaze
- Labels: Fire Talk Records
- Past members: Lani Combier-Kapel; Amanda Salane; Sara Fantry
- Website: https://advaeta.blogspot.com

Advaeta was an American alt-rock trio based in Brooklyn, New York. The band consisted of members Lani Combier-Kapel, Amanda Salane, and Sara Fantry.

== History ==
Combier-Kapel and Fantry attended Fiorello H. LaGuardia High School of Music & Art and Performing Arts together in Manhattan. Salane and Fantry began making music together after meeting at a party; soon after, they decided the group needed a drummer and invited Combier-Kapel to join. The group was originally named Advaita, but changed the spelling in 2012 to avoid being mistaken for a New Delhi-based band of the same name.

In March 2015, the band embarked on a tour that included performances at South by Southwest (SXSW) in Austin, Texas. During the festival, they also played at an event hosted by Stereogum and Exploding In Sound Records, alongside fellow indie acts Alex G, Speedy Ortiz, Girlpool, and Pity Sex.

The same month, Billboard featured the band on its list of "20 All-Female Bands You Need To Know". On April 1, 2015, Salane published a blog post on the band's website titled "All-Female Is Not A Genre", criticizing the gender binary in the music industry.

On April 28, 2015, Advaeta released their debut studio album, Death and the Internet, via Fire Talk Records. Impose named the record one of the best albums of the year.

On February 23, 2016, the band announced that they were taking an "indefinite hiatus" in order to focus on other projects. Following their departure from Advaeta, Combier-Kapel and Fantry formed the experimental noise punk band Weeping Icon, while Salane started the experimental band Godxss (stylized in all caps).

== Musical style and influences ==
Billboard described the band's sound as "distorted and romantic," calling their music "a relaxing shoegaze soundscape." Pitchfork critic Philip Sherburne compared the band's track "Angelfish" to Garlands by Cocteau Twins.

The band cited various artists and groups as influences, including Glenn Branca, Spacemen 3, Joy Division, The Velvet Underground, The Stooges, Sleep, Ace of Base, Les Rallizes Dénudés, Can, The Electric Hole, and Neon Blud. In a 2015 interview, Combier-Kapel stated that she aimed to write beats similar to those created by Stephen Morris of Joy Division. The band has also cited the Brooklyn music scene and local bands such as Guerilla Toss and Bambara as inspirations for their own music.

== Other projects ==
Combier-Kapel was also a member of the Silent Barn Collective and played drums in the band Warcries.

Salane also created music under the alias of 999Reversus.

== Members ==
- Lani Combier-Kapel – vocals, drums
- Sara Fantry – vocals, guitar
- Amanda Salane – vocals, guitar

== Discography ==
=== Studio albums ===
- Death and the Internet (Fire Talk, 2015)

=== Singles ===
- Angelfish (Fire Talk, 2015)
