= Shirlette Ammons =

American musician, poet, and producer

Shirlette Ammons is an American hip-hop artist, poet, and producer from Durham, North Carolina. She is known for her interdisciplinary work combining music, poetry, and film, and for exploring themes of race, gender, and sexuality. One of her most notable works is "Get Dressed" from Twilight For Gladys Bentley is in honor of 1920s Harlem Renaissance blues singer Gladys Bentley, who was lesbian.

== Early life and education ==
Ammons was raised in Mount Olive, North Carolina and later moved to Durham. She grew up with a twin sister and began writing poetry at a young age. Her early influences included both Southern gospel and hip hop, which shaped her later musical style.

== Career ==
Ammons first gained recognition in the North Carolina arts community through her poetry and spoken word performances. She released her debut solo music project, Twilight for Gladys Bentley (2012), inspired by the 1920s Harlem Renaissance blues singer Gladys Bentley. The album included the single "Get Dressed," which pays homage to Bentley's defiance of gender norms.

Her second album, Language Barrier (2016), released on her own label SugarQube, featured collaborations with artists including Meshell Ndegeocello, Amelia Meath of Sylvan Esso, and MC Lyte. In 2024, she released Spectacles, an album that reflects on visibility and identity as a Black queer artist, followed by a remix album Spectacles RMXD later that year.

Beyond her music career, Ammons has worked extensively in film and television production. She has served as a producer for the PBS series A Chef’s Life and Somewhere South, both of which won Emmy and Peabody Awards. She also directed the short documentary The Hook, which received the 2016 Pitch Black Prize from Black Public Media.

== Themes and style ==
Ammons's work often addresses intersections of race, gender, sexuality, and Southern identity. Critics have noted her blending of hip hop, funk, rock, and spoken word, as well as her collaborative approach across artistic disciplines.

== Discography ==
- Twilight for Gladys Bentley (2012)
- Language Barrier (2016)
- Spectacles (2024)
- Spectacles RMXD (2024)
- All Down (single, 2025)
