= Renata Zeiguer =

American indie folk musician

Renata Zeiguer is an American indie folk musician from New York City, New York.

== History ==
Zeiguer released her first EP, Horizons, in 2013. Zeiguer signed to Brooklyn-based record label Northern Spy Records in 2017. After signing to the label, Zeiguer announced plans to release her first full-length album. The album, titled Old Ghost, was released on February 23, 2018. At the end of 2018, Zeiguer was named one of Paste's "20 Best New Artists of 2018". In 2022, Zeiguer announced her second full-length album. The album, titled Picnic in the Dark, was released on April 8, 2022, via Northern Spy Records.
